= List of United States tornadoes in May 2017 =

This page documents all tornadoes confirmed by various weather forecast offices of the National Weather Service in the United States throughout May 2017.

== United States yearly total ==
Confirmed tornadoes by Enhanced Fujita rating
| EFU | EF0 | EF1 | EF2 | EF3 | EF4 | EF5 | Total |
|---|---|---|---|---|---|---|---|
| 67 | 618 | 592* | 128 | 13 | 2 | 0 | 1,420 |

- Note: An EF2 tornado from Canada crossed into the United States, where that portion of the track was rated EF1.

== May ==
Confirmed tornadoes by Enhanced Fujita rating
| EFU | EF0 | EF1 | EF2 | EF3 | EF4 | EF5 | Total |
|---|---|---|---|---|---|---|---|
| 42 | 130 | 101 | 13 | 2 | 0 | 0 | 288 |

=== May 1 event ===
List of confirmed tornadoes – Monday, May 1, 2017 (Note: All dates are based on the local time zone where the tornado touched down; however, all times are in Coordinated Universal Time for consistency.)
| EF# | Location | County / Parish | State | Start Coord. | Time (UTC) | Path length | Max width | Summary |
|---|---|---|---|---|---|---|---|---|
| EF0 | Fort Benning | Chattahoochee | GA | 32.34°N 84.928°W | 14:07–14:08 | 0.46 mi (0.74 km) | 50 yd (46 m) | Trees were snapped or uprooted. |
| EF0 | E of Free Home | Forsyth | GA | 34.2529°N 84.2152°W | 14:24–14:28 | 2.36 mi (3.80 km) | 150 yd (140 m) | A few large trees were uprooted, and many tree limbs and branches were broken. One tree fell on a mobile home. |
| EF0 | NW of Prospect | Butler | PA | 40.911°N 80.076°W | 18:30–18:33 | 2.86 mi (4.60 km) | 50 yd (46 m) | Dozens of softwood and hardwood trees were snapped or uprooted. Roof panels on a barn were ripped off, and paneling was removed from a trailer door. A frame home sustained minor damage, and skirting was removed from mobile homes at a mobile home park, where falling trees caused damage to structures and vehicles. Greenhouses were damaged, and a storage container was lofted over one of the greenhouses. |
| EF0 | W of Parker | Butler | PA | 41.092°N 79.732°W | 18:56–18:57 | 0.38 mi (0.61 km) | 50 yd (46 m) | A brief and narrow tornado snapped or uprooted several trees. |
| EF0 | Beaver Township | Clarion | PA | 41.189°N 79.553°W | 19:09–19:10 | 0.88 mi (1.42 km) | 75 yd (69 m) | Shingles were ripped from outbuildings, yard items were displaced, and trees were damaged. |
| EF0 | NE of Scotch Hill | Clarion | PA | 41.331°N 79.255°W | 19:25–19:26 | 0.54 mi (0.87 km) | 100 yd (91 m) | A brief tornado snapped or uprooted dozens of trees. |
| EF0 | Cooksburg | Clarion | PA | 41.331°N 79.224°W | 19:27–19:28 | 0.75 mi (1.21 km) | 75 yd (69 m) | Dozens of trees were snapped or uprooted by this brief tornado. |
| EF1 | Green Township | Clarion, Forest | PA | 41.408°N 79.355°W | 19:27–19:31 | 2.23 mi (3.59 km) | 100 yd (91 m) | An extensive swath of trees were snapped and uprooted, damaging several cabins upon falling. |
| EF2 | SE of Marienville (1st tornado) | Forest | PA | 41.424°N 79.098°W | 19:40–19:42 | 0.9 mi (1.4 km) | 350 yd (320 m) | An initially narrow tornado grew in scale rapidly with several embedded sub-vortices, causing considerable and widespread damage to hardwood and softwood trees over a nearly mile-long path. This path was documented via aerial imagery after being discovered and documented by Forest Service personnel. |
| EF2 | SE of Marienville (2nd tornado) | Forest, Elk | PA | 41.432°N 79.074°W | 19:42–19:44 | 1.1 mi (1.8 km) | 175 yd (160 m) | A narrow, convergent path of intense damage was documented via aerial imagery after being discovered and documented by Forest Service personnel. Damage consisted entirely of uprooted and snapped hardwood and softwood trees. |
| EF0 | SE of Newton | Catawba | NC | 35.61°N 81.20°W | 19:54–19:58 | 2.67 mi (4.30 km) | 50 yd (46 m) | Intermittent tornado snapped or uprooted many large trees, some of which landed on structures and caused damage. Minor roof, siding, and window damage also occurred. |
| EF1 | Dahoga | Elk | PA | 41.5884°N 78.7435°W | 20:08–20:09 | 1.68 mi (2.70 km) | 200 yd (180 m) | Numerous trees were knocked down along the path. |
| EF1 | Rebersburg | Centre | PA | 40.9386°N 77.4583°W | 22:44–22:45 | 1.1 mi (1.8 km) | 100 yd (91 m) | Several dozen homes and outbuildings in town were damaged, and dozens of trees were snapped or uprooted. A utility pole was snapped, and one person was injured when a work shed collapsed onto him. |

=== May 2 event ===
List of confirmed tornadoes – Tuesday, May 2, 2017
| EF# | Location | County / Parish | State | Start Coord. | Time (UTC) | Path length | Max width |
|---|---|---|---|---|---|---|---|
| EF0 | NE of Belle Glade | Palm Beach | FL | 26.74°N 80.61°W | 21:30–21:35 | 0.25 mi (0.40 km) | 25 yd (23 m) |
| EF0 | Tornado observed over an open field. | | | | | | |

=== May 3 event ===
List of confirmed tornadoes – Wednesday, May 3, 2017
| EF# | Location | County / Parish | State | Start Coord. | Time (UTC) | Path length | Max width |
|---|---|---|---|---|---|---|---|
| EF1 | SW of Carthage | Panola | TX | 32.0980°N 94.5231°W | 21:14–21:22 | 8.37 mi (13.47 km) | 1,500 yd (1,400 m) |
| EF1 | A large metal outbuilding was completely rolled over while several others were damaged by this large wedge tornado. Many trees were snapped or uprooted. The roof was ripped off a metal building, and two homes sustained damage to their roofs. | | | | | | |
| EF0 | SE of Lufkin | Angelina | TX | 31.3323°N 94.7158°W | 22:31–22:37 | 5.74 mi (9.24 km) | 300 yd (270 m) |
| EF0 | Several large trees were uprooted, some of which landed on homes. Power lines and power poles were downed as well. | | | | | | |

=== May 4 event ===
List of confirmed tornadoes – Thursday, May 4, 2017
| EF# | Location | County / Parish | State | Start Coord. | Time (UTC) | Path length | Max width |
|---|---|---|---|---|---|---|---|
| EF0 | ENE of Willacoochee | Atkinson | GA | 31.3841°N 82.9376°W | 17:25–17:26 | 0.02 mi (0.032 km) | 35 yd (32 m) |
| EF0 | A garage sustained severe roof damage. | | | | | | |
| EF1 | E of West Green | Coffee | GA | 31.5894°N 82.6965°W | 18:04–18:10 | 1.9 mi (3.1 km) | 60 yd (55 m) |
| EF1 | A home and an outbuilding were damaged and several trees were snapped. | | | | | | |
| EF1 | ESE of Denton | Jeff Davis | GA | 31.6869°N 82.6207°W | 18:20–18:23 | 1 mi (1.6 km) | 70 yd (64 m) |
| EF1 | Three old outbuildings were destroyed, three others were damaged, and several trees were snapped or uprooted. | | | | | | |
| EF1 | ESE of Garden City | Chatham | GA | 32.0808°N 81.148°W | 21:50–22:00 | 2.78 mi (4.47 km) | 120 yd (110 m) |
| EF1 | Numerous trees were snapped or uprooted. A few homes and other structures sustained minor damage, including one home that had its garage door blown out and a second with wall damage. An Advanced Auto Parts store saw three of its walls collapsed and its roof heavily damaged and shifted halfway off the remaining rear wall. At least five cars were heavily damaged after the collapse of the front wall. Some shipping containers were pushed over and some container tanks were damaged at the Port of Savannah. Five people were injured. | | | | | | |
| EF1 | W of Walterboro | Colleton | SC | 32.7928°N 80.7776°W | 23:46–00:10 | 12.52 mi (20.15 km) | 440 yd (400 m) |
| EF1 | Several homes, mobile homes, and outbuildings sustained damage to their roofs, windows, and/or skirting. Power lines and thousands of trees were downed. A trampoline was tossed into a tree line, and a large billboard was damaged. | | | | | | |
| EF1 | NW of Walterboro | Colleton | SC | 32.988°N 80.6494°W | 00:15–00:25 | 6.03 mi (9.70 km) | 125 yd (114 m) |
| EF1 | Trees and tree limbs were snapped. | | | | | | |
| EF1 | E of Canadys | Colleton, Dorchester | SC | 33.0529°N 80.5846°W | 00:26–00:28 | 2.02 mi (3.25 km) | 150 yd (140 m) |
| EF1 | Numerous trees were damaged, snapped, or uprooted. | | | | | | |
| EF1 | Holly Hill | Orangeburg | SC | 33.287°N 80.445°W | 01:01–01:06 | 3.08 mi (4.96 km) | 150 yd (140 m) |
| EF1 | Several trees were snapped or uprooted, including two that fell on an occupied mobile home. Another tree fell on three vehicles. A strip mall in downtown Holly Hill had a large section of its metal roof torn off. | | | | | | |
| EF0 | Atlanta Airport | Fulton | GA | 33.656°N 84.4185°W | 01:12–01:13 | 0.11 mi (0.18 km) | 50 yd (46 m) |
| EF0 | A brief tornado picked up eight to ten cargo bins, throwing three or four onto the roof of a neighboring building. Two trees were snapped, and a fence was downed. | | | | | | |
| EF1 | SE of Lydia | Darlington | SC | 34.2296°N 80.0709°W | 01:37–01:44 | 2.07 mi (3.33 km) | 75 yd (69 m) |
| EF1 | A few large trees were uprooted, including one that fell on a garage. A home sustained significant roof and awning damage while a tin carport was blown a few hundred yards. One mobile home was destroyed while a second sustained heavy damage. | | | | | | |
| EF0 | NE of Avondale Estates | DeKalb | GA | 33.7785°N 84.2520°W | 01:40–01:42 | 1.1 mi (1.8 km) | 80 yd (73 m) |
| EF0 | A few trees were uprooted and numerous large tree branches were snapped. | | | | | | |
| EF1 | E of Hartsville | Darlington | SC | 34.3570°N 80.0505°W | 02:07–02:10 | 0.86 mi (1.38 km) | 75 yd (69 m) |
| EF1 | An RV trailer was overturned, injuring one person inside. A mobile home was destroyed, and a utility trailer was flipped. A few trees were damaged, and several homes sustained significant damage to their siding and awnings. | | | | | | |
| EF0 | SE of Patrick | Chesterfield | SC | 34.5396°N 79.9972°W | 02:27–02:28 | 0.2 mi (0.32 km) | 75 yd (69 m) |
| EF0 | A few trees were uprooted and large tree limbs were snapped. A few farm buildings were destroyed, and a couple of single-wide mobile homes sustained roof and skirting damage. | | | | | | |

=== May 5 event ===
List of confirmed tornadoes – Friday, May 5, 2017
| EF# | Location | County / Parish | State | Start Coord. | Time (UTC) | Path length | Max width |
|---|---|---|---|---|---|---|---|
| EF1 | Eden | Rockingham | NC | 36.4869°N 79.7452°W | 07:12–07:18 | 3.26 mi (5.25 km) | 375 yd (343 m) |
| EF1 | This high-end EF1 tornado moved directly through Eden. Significant damage to fencing, poles, and structures occurred at a baseball field complex. Multiple homes and businesses were damaged, some severely. Many trees were snapped and uprooted as well, some of which landed on structures. | | | | | | |
| EF0 | S of Moneta | Bedford | VA | 37.1121°N 79.6136°W | 08:04–08:06 | 0.3 mi (0.48 km) | 100 yd (91 m) |
| EF0 | Trees were snapped or uprooted, and houses sustained minor structural damage. | | | | | | |
| EF1 | NE of Oxford | Granville | NC | 36.365°N 78.559°W | 09:21–92:22 | 1 mi (1.6 km) | 250 yd (230 m) |
| EF1 | Numerous softwood and hardwood trees were snapped or uprooted. Two homes were damaged by fallen trees, including one that also sustained minor siding damage. The roof of an outbuilding was blown off. | | | | | | |
| EF1 | SSW of Boydton to N of Baskerville | Mecklenburg | VA | 36.5767°N 78.4405°W | 09:40–09:50 | 14.79 mi (23.80 km) | 75 yd (69 m) |
| EF1 | A barn was destroyed, an outbuilding sustained minor damage to its flashing, and trees were snapped or uprooted along a discontinuous path. | | | | | | |
| EF0 | SSW of Kenbridge | Lunenburg | VA | 36.8435°N 78.1685°W | 10:13–10:14 | 1.01 mi (1.63 km) | 75 yd (69 m) |
| EF0 | Trees were uprooted and had large branches broken off, a house minor damage to its flashing, and a kennel was damaged by falling trees. Tornado had a discontinuous path, touching down two separate times. | | | | | | |
| EF0 | NW of Moseley | Powhatan | VA | 37.4742°N 77.7899°W | 10:40–10:50 | 0.38 mi (0.61 km) | 75 yd (69 m) |
| EF0 | Many trees were snapped or uprooted, of which several fell onto homes. | | | | | | |
| EF1 | NNW of Rawlings to WNW of McKenney | Brunswick, Dinwiddie | VA | 36.9716°N 77.7774°W | 10:50–10:55 | 2.42 mi (3.89 km) | 300 yd (270 m) |
| EF1 | A home and a greenhouse were damaged and a semi-trailer was overturned. Damage occurred to barns and outbuildings, some of which lost sheet metal roofing, and a small barn was collapsed. Trees were snapped, uprooted or downed along the path. | | | | | | |
| EF1 | N of Church Road | Dinwiddie | VA | 37.1887°N 77.6428°W | 11:09–11:12 | 2.31 mi (3.72 km) | 150 yd (140 m) |
| EF1 | Extensive damage to trees occurred along the path. | | | | | | |
| EF0 | N of Merry Hill to ENE of Colerain | Bertie, Chowan | NC | 36.0815°N 76.7552°W | 11:27–11:45 | 11.71 mi (18.85 km) | 100 yd (91 m) |
| EF0 | Trees were uprooted, with large tree branches snapped as well. One barn was completely destroyed, while a second barn and numerous small outbuildings were severely damaged. A few homes sustained damage to their shingles and siding. A single-wide mobile home was knocked off its foundation. | | | | | | |
| EF0 | E of Camden | Camden, Currituck | NC | 36.3144°N 76.1431°W | 12:02–12:13 | 8.12 mi (13.07 km) | 75 yd (69 m) |
| EF0 | A few houses sustained minor damage. Numerous trees were sheared or snapped. | | | | | | |
| EF1 | Bledsoe Corner | Orange | VA | 38.3269°N 77.9033°W | 12:17–12:18 | 0.87 mi (1.40 km) | 100 yd (91 m) |
| EF1 | A stone wall was blown over, small objects were carried hundreds of yards, and multiple trees were snapped or uprooted. Several homes sustained damage from tornadic winds or fallen trees. A cinder block garage had its roof ripped off and walls knocked down. | | | | | | |
| EF1 | Dahlgren | King George | VA | 38.345°N 77.0189°W | 13:19–13:21 | 1.18 mi (1.90 km) | 10 yd (9.1 m) |
| EF1 | Many trees were snapped and many small limbs were broken. Four cars were flipped as documented by a security camera. An equipment shed was destroyed, bleachers were blown into a fence, and a metal bench was damaged at a baseball field in Barnesfield Park. | | | | | | |
| EF0 | N of Ivor | Southampton, Surry | VA | 36.9321°N 76.9175°W | 23:55–00:10 | 4.91 mi (7.90 km) | 75 yd (69 m) |
| EF0 | Several trees were uprooted, and chunks of asphalt from a nearby road under construction were scattered. | | | | | | |

=== May 7 event ===
List of confirmed tornadoes – Sunday, May 7, 2017
| EF# | Location | County / Parish | State | Start Coord. | Time (UTC) | Path length | Max width |
|---|---|---|---|---|---|---|---|
| EF0 | Western Apple Valley | San Bernardino | CA | 34.6207°N 117.3743°W | 20:30–20:45 | 0.01 mi (0.016 km) | 50 yd (46 m) |
| EF0 | A landspout was photographed near Apple Valley; no damage occurred. | | | | | | |

=== May 8 event ===
List of confirmed tornadoes – Monday, May 8, 2017
| EF# | Location | County / Parish | State | Start Coord. | Time (UTC) | Path length | Max width |
|---|---|---|---|---|---|---|---|
| EF1 | N of Farista | Huerfano | CO | 37.9027°N 105.0433°W | 20:24–20:25 | 0.19 mi (0.31 km) | 100 yd (91 m) |
| EF1 | Dozens of conifer trees were snapped or uprooted. | | | | | | |
| EF0 | NNE of Roy | Harding | NM | 36.03°N 104.15°W | 00:17–00:20 | 0.2 mi (0.32 km) | 40 yd (37 m) |
| EF0 | A brief tornado was reported by a storm chaser. | | | | | | |

=== May 9 event ===
List of confirmed tornadoes – Tuesday, May 9, 2017
| EF# | Location | County / Parish | State | Start Coord. | Time (UTC) | Path length | Max width |
|---|---|---|---|---|---|---|---|
| EF0 | W of Clines Corners | Torrance | NM | 34.9942°N 105.6885°W | 18:15–18:35 | 3.01 mi (4.84 km) | 40 yd (37 m) |
| EF0 | Tornado reported by a trained spotter as it crossed Interstate 40; trees were uprooted. | | | | | | |
| EF0 | NE of Santa Fe Municipal Airport | Santa Fe | NM | 35.6425°N 106.0433°W | 18:25–18:27 | 0.31 mi (0.50 km) | 40 yd (37 m) |
| EF0 | A brief tornado caused generally minor damage. | | | | | | |
| EF0 | NNE of Nogal | Lincoln | NM | 33.6953°N 105.7771°W | 18:55–18:56 | 0.07 mi (0.11 km) | 30 yd (27 m) |
| EF0 | A trained spotter reported a tornado. | | | | | | |
| EF0 | NE of Wagon Mound | Mora | NM | 36.0459°N 104.5239°W | 22:00–22:05 | 3.49 mi (5.62 km) | 50 yd (46 m) |
| EF0 | Cone-shaped tornado confirmed by spotters near Interstate 25. | | | | | | |
| EFU | WNW of Brandon | Kiowa | CO | 38.4563°N 102.4502°W | 00:11–00:13 | 1.18 mi (1.90 km) | 50 yd (46 m) |
| EFU | A brief landspout tornado was observed by the public. | | | | | | |
| EFU | SW of Bula | Bailey | TX | 33.86°N 102.70°W | 00:46 | 0.01 mi (0.016 km) | 20 yd (18 m) |
| EFU | Brief tornado reported by storm chasers. | | | | | | |
| EFU | W of Sudan | Lamb | TX | 34.07°N 102.54°W | 01:45 | 0.01 mi (0.016 km) | 15 yd (14 m) |
| EFU | Brief tornado reported by storm chasers. | | | | | | |
| EFU | SE of Bledsoe | Cochran | TX | 33.49°N 102.86°W | 02:31–02:32 | 0.01 mi (0.016 km) | 30 yd (27 m) |
| EFU | Rope tornado reported by a trained spotter west of Highway 214. | | | | | | |

=== May 10 event ===
List of reported tornadoes – Wednesday, May 10, 2017
| EF# | Location | County / Parish | State | Start Coord. | Time (UTC) | Path length | Max width |
|---|---|---|---|---|---|---|---|
| EF1 | ENE of Goodnight | Armstrong, Donley | TX | 35.04°N 101.10°W | 08:27–08:36 | 2.8 mi (4.5 km) | 180 yd (160 m) |
| EF1 | A tornado overturned a center irrigation pivot, snapped numerous trees, and downed power poles. Debris was lofted 100 to 200 yd (91 to 183 m) away in some locations. | | | | | | |
| EF1 | McClellan Creek National Grassland | Gray | TX | 35.2°N 100.9°W | 09:01–09:09 | 2.65 mi (4.26 km) | 50 yd (46 m) |
| EF1 | A tornado touched down over an open field and later paralleled the northern shore of Lake McClellan. Numerous large trees were snapped or uprooted and some RVs were damaged. | | | | | | |
| EF0 | ESE of Raton | Colfax | NM | 36.9205°N 104.1799°W | 18:37–18:42 | 1.66 mi (2.67 km) | 50 yd (46 m) |
| EF0 | Tornado reported by local emergency management along U.S. Route 87. | | | | | | |
| EFU | E of Matador | Motley | TX | 34.0234°N 100.773°W | 19:54 | 0.01 mi (0.016 km) | 10 yd (9.1 m) |
| EFU | A storm chaser observed a brief tornado. | | | | | | |
| EFU | N of Paducah | Cottle | TX | 34.1744°N 100.2891°W | 20:37–20:38 | 0.01 mi (0.016 km) | 10 yd (9.1 m) |
| EFU | Brief tornado observed by a trained spotter. | | | | | | |
| EF0 | NW of Hillsboro | Van Buren, Henry | IA | 40.8518°N 91.7564°W | 20:46–20:52 | 2.77 mi (4.46 km) | 50 yd (46 m) |
| EF0 | A tornado tracked through forested areas; however, survey teams were unable to reach these spots. Some tree damage was observed. | | | | | | |
| EFU | SE of Childress | Cottle | TX | 34.3019°N 100.0641°W | 20:58–21:00 | 1.05 mi (1.69 km) | 25 yd (23 m) |
| EFU | Multiple storm chasers and research meteorologists observed a tornado. | | | | | | |
| EFU | WSW of Lakeview | Hall | TX | 34.6332°N 100.935°W | 21:44–21:45 | 0.36 mi (0.58 km) | 50 yd (46 m) |
| EFU | Broadcast media confirmed a brief, rain-wrapped tornado. | | | | | | |
| EFU | E of Loveland | Tillman | OK | 34.3016°N 98.679°W | 00:31 | 0.3 mi (0.48 km) | 50 yd (46 m) |
| EFU | Trained spotters and storm chasers observed a tornado crossing State Highway 36. | | | | | | |
| EF0 | S of Argenta | Macon | IL | 39.9516°N 88.8247°W | 00:49–00:50 | 0.1 mi (0.16 km) | 20 yd (18 m) |
| EF0 | Several pine trees were snapped. | | | | | | |
| EF0 | ENE of Davidson | Tillman | OK | 34.27°N 98.94°W | 01:05 | 0.3 mi (0.48 km) | 30 yd (27 m) |
| EF0 | A storm chaser reported a tornado. No damage occurred. | | | | | | |
| EFU | SSE of Chattanooga | Cotton, Tillman | OK | 34.34°N 98.63°W | 01:36–01:41 | 2 mi (3.2 km) | 100 yd (91 m) |
| EFU | Radar-indicated tornado verified by Penn State storm chasers. | | | | | | |
| EFU | N of Laughlin Air Force Base | Val Verde | TX | 29.4279°N 100.78°W | 03:58–03:59 | 0.1 mi (0.16 km) | 10 yd (9.1 m) |
| EFU | Weather personnel reported a tornado north of Laughlin Air Force Base. | | | | | | |

=== May 11 event ===
List of reported tornadoes – Thursday, May 11, 2017
| EF# | Location | County / Parish | State | Start Coord. | Time (UTC) | Path length | Max width |
|---|---|---|---|---|---|---|---|
| EF0 | NW of Neosho | Newton | MO | 36.9052°N 94.4182°W | 05:34–05:45 | 1 mi (1.6 km) | 100 yd (91 m) |
| EF0 | A brief tornado damaged or destroyed several sheds, uprooted trees, and caused minor roof damage to homes. | | | | | | |
| EF1 | NE of Owasso | Rogers | OK | 36.3040°N 95.7948°W | 19:01–19:08 | 1.5 mi (2.4 km) | 300 yd (270 m) |
| EF1 | Trees were uprooted, barns were damaged, the roofs of homes were damaged, and power poles were toppled. | | | | | | |
| EF1 | SE of Oologah | Rogers | OK | 36.3775°N 95.6616°W | 19:27–19:33 | 3.1 mi (5.0 km) | 350 yd (320 m) |
| EF1 | Several trees were uprooted and many large limbs were snapped. | | | | | | |
| EFU | SW of Perkins | Payne | OK | 35.9698°N 97.0427°W | 20:13 | 0.1 mi (0.16 km) | 50 yd (46 m) |
| EFU | Multiple trained spotters and storm chasers reported a tornado. | | | | | | |
| EF0 | SSW of Edgewood | Van Zandt | TX | 32.6568°N 95.9109°W | 20:55–20:57 | 2.09 mi (3.36 km) | 50 yd (46 m) |
| EF0 | Two homes sustained damage from airborne debris. | | | | | | |
| EF0 | NE of Ramona | Washington | OK | 36.5454°N 95.9009°W | 22:11 | 0.1 mi (0.16 km) | 50 yd (46 m) |
| EF0 | A brief tornado was filmed by a KOTV-DT helicopter; no damage was found. | | | | | | |
| EF1 | WNW of Gladewater | Upshur | TX | 32.5528°N 95.0058°W | 23:09–23:11 | 1.28 mi (2.06 km) | 175 yd (160 m) |
| EF1 | Numerous trees were snapped or uprooted, including some which fell on a motor home, a mobile home, and a pickup truck. A few shingles were blown off the back of a home. | | | | | | |
| EF1 | SE of Union Grove | Upshur, Gregg | TX | 32.5738°N 94.8971°W | 23:23–23:29 | 2.69 mi (4.33 km) | 220 yd (200 m) |
| EF1 | Several large trees were snapped or uprooted, and a few homes had shingles blown off. A small section of the roof and steeple at Shiloh Baptist Church were ripped off and tossed. | | | | | | |
| EF1 | N of Mount Enterprise | Rusk | TX | 32.0177°N 94.6932°W | 00:03–00:16 | 5.3 mi (8.5 km) | 280 yd (260 m) |
| EF1 | Several trees were snapped or uprooted, of which at least two fell on a house and an outbuilding. | | | | | | |
| EF1 | Oil City | Caddo | LA | 32.7265°N 93.9739°W | 01:15–01:20 | 2.32 mi (3.73 km) | 215 yd (197 m) |
| EF1 | Numerous trees were snapped or uprooted. A metal roof was ripped from a metal office building at a park playground and carried into some nearby power lines. | | | | | | |
| EF1 | SW of Gilliam | Caddo | LA | 32.7976°N 93.8878°W | 01:31–01:34 | 0.76 mi (1.22 km) | 110 yd (100 m) |
| EF1 | Several trees were snapped, one of which fell on power lines. | | | | | | |
| EF2 | Garrison | Nacogdoches, Rusk, Shelby | TX | 31.815°N 94.4989°W | 01:33–01:45 | 4.57 mi (7.35 km) | 800 yd (730 m) |
| EF2 | A dentist office in downtown Garrison had a section of its roof ripped off, and several other buildings had roof damage. An auto shop had its roof lifted and deposited in the parking lot of a bank, as well as two of its outer cinder block walls collapsed. A chicken farm outside of town had one of its chicken coops destroyed, killing all chicken inside, and five others damaged. Several power poles were snapped, several homes sustained roof damage from fallen trees, and at least 20 outbuildings were damaged or destroyed. | | | | | | |

=== May 12 event ===
List of reported tornadoes – Friday, May 12, 2017
| EF# | Location | County / Parish | State | Start Coord. | Time (UTC) | Path length | Max width |
|---|---|---|---|---|---|---|---|
| EF1 | NNE of Fields | Beauregard | LA | 30.5699°N 93.57°W | 09:06–09:12 | 3.04 mi (4.89 km) | 267 yd (244 m) |
| EF1 | Numerous trees and two power poles were downed. One fallen tree caused severe damage to a barn. | | | | | | |
| EF1 | ESE of Baton Rouge | East Baton Rouge | LA | 30.4345°N 91.0662°W | 14:01–14:03 | 0.6 mi (0.97 km) | 30 yd (27 m) |
| EF1 | A tornado damaged buildings, vehicles, trees, and power lines near Baton Rouge. One person was injured. | | | | | | |
| EF1 | White Castle | Iberville | LA | 30.163°N 91.148°W | 14:01–14:02 | 0.14 mi (0.23 km) | 40 yd (37 m) |
| EF1 | Large tree limbs were snapped and homes sustained minor roof damage. | | | | | | |
| EF0 | SSW of Marrero | Jefferson | LA | 29.8531°N 90.1182°W | 16:13–16:14 | 0.2 mi (0.32 km) | 25 yd (23 m) |
| EF0 | Two carports were ripped from homes. A rear car window was blown out. Trees and power lines were damaged. | | | | | | |
| EF0 | Shady Valley | Johnson | TN | 36.5211°N 81.9314°W | 20:30–20:38 | 0.13 mi (0.21 km) | 40 yd (37 m) |
| EF0 | Two homes sustained roof damage and two sheds and a carport were completely destroyed. | | | | | | |
| EF0 | NW of Madisonville | St. Tammany | LA | 30.4469°N 90.2206°W | 21:35–21:37 | 0.54 mi (0.87 km) | 20 yd (18 m) |
| EF0 | A brief tornado snapped multiple trees; one tree fell on and damaged a home. | | | | | | |

=== May 15 event ===
List of reported tornadoes – Monday, May 15, 2017
| EF# | Location | County / parish | State | Start coord. | Time (UTC) | Path length | Max. width | Summary |
|---|---|---|---|---|---|---|---|---|
| EF0 | W of Calmar | Winneshiek | IA | 43.1806°N 91.9223°W | 23:45–23:47 | 0.98 mi (1.58 km) | 50 yd (46 m) | Surveyors found a broken line of tree damage. |

=== May 16 event ===
List of reported tornadoes – Tuesday, May 16, 2017
| EF# | Location | County / parish | State | Start coord. | Time (UTC) | Path length | Max. width | Summary |
|---|---|---|---|---|---|---|---|---|
| EF0 | NE of Balko | Beaver | OK | 36.68°N 100.71°W | 19:45–19:46 | 0.09 mi (0.14 km) | 25 yd (23 m) | Brief tornado remained over open country and caused no damage. |
| EF0 | NW of Waka | Hansford | TX | 36.35°N 101.14°W | 20:04–20:05 | 0.09 mi (0.14 km) | 25 yd (23 m) | Brief tornado remained over open country and caused no damage. |
| EF0 | SSW of McLean | Donley | TX | 35.16°N 100.65°W | 21:39–21:50 | 1.39 mi (2.24 km) | 50 yd (46 m) | Tornado remained over open country and caused no damage. |
| EF3 | WNW of Reeve to N of Chetek to WSW of Ogema | Polk, Barron, Rusk, Price | WI | 45.2529°N 92.1619°W | 21:42–00:10 | 82.53 mi (132.82 km) | 1,320 yd (1,210 m) | 1 death – See section on this tornado – There were 25 injuries. |
| EF0 | NE of Exeter | Fillmore | NE | 40.6662°N 97.4305°W | 21:43–21:52 | 1.83 mi (2.95 km) | 35 yd (32 m) | A trained storm spotter observed a landspout tornado. An auger was turned over and some tin was removed from a roof. |
| EF0 | E of McLean | Wheeler | TX | 35.23°N 100.49°W | 21:53–21:54 | 0.06 mi (0.097 km) | 25 yd (23 m) | Brief tornado remained over open country and caused no damage. |
| EF1 | NNW of Shamrock | Wheeler | TX | 35.31°N 100.38°W | 22:16–22:17 | 0.09 mi (0.14 km) | 25 yd (23 m) | A power line and trees were damaged. |
| EF2 | SE of Wheeler | Wheeler | TX | 35.37°N 100.29°W | 22:25–22:44 | 9.18 mi (14.77 km) | 1,250 yd (1,140 m) | Large rain-wrapped wedge tornado. A double-wide mobile home was completely destroyed, with its debris scattered hundreds of yards downwind. Several other structures were damaged, a large number of power poles were snapped off at the base, and numerous trees were snapped or uprooted. A cotton stripper was overturned, and a truck was tossed nearly 200 yards (180 meters). Oil equipment and holding tanks were damaged as well. |
| EF0 | ESE of Aberdeen | Collingsworth | TX | 35.02°N 100.05°W | 22:45–22:46 | 0.29 mi (0.47 km) | 25 yd (23 m) | Brief tornado remained over open country and caused no damage. |
| EF1 | SE of Minneola | Clark | KS | 37.3764°N 100.0012°W | 22:49–22:58 | 4.03 mi (6.49 km) | 50 yd (46 m) | A narrow tornado rolled an RV camper at a storage lot, destroyed an old pole barn, ripped an exterior wall off of a small abandoned house, and tore roof panels off a metal outbuilding. |
| EF0 | E of Lutie | Collingsworth | TX | 35.02°N 100.05°W | 22:50–22:51 | 2.26 mi (3.64 km) | 25 yd (23 m) | Brief tornado remained over open country and caused no damage. |
| EFU | S of Erick | Beckham | OK | 35.07°N 99.92°W | 23:08–23:11 | 1 mi (1.6 km) | 20 yd (18 m) | The Erick Fire Department, and storm chasers, observed a tornado. |
| EF2 | SSE of Reydon to WNW of Cheyenne | Roger Mills | OK | 35.564°N 99.917°W | 23:18–23:30 | 10.25 mi (16.50 km) | 150 yd (140 m) | This tornado snapped numerous power poles, tore the roof off of a small hotel and a barn, and uprooted trees. A 16-foot grain feeder that was full of grain was overturned. |
| EFU | SSE of Erick | Beckham | OK | 35.12°N 99.85°W | 23:23–23:25 | 1.13 mi (1.82 km) | 50 yd (46 m) | An NWS employee observed a tornado. |
| EF0 | WSW of Brandon | Perkins | NE | 40.77°N 102.02°W | 23:36–23:37 | 0.1 mi (0.16 km) | 20 yd (18 m) | A brief tornado was observed but caused no damage. |
| EF1 | NNW of Strong City | Roger Mills | OK | 35.75°N 99.69°W | 23:45–23:46 | 0.75 mi (1.21 km) | 50 yd (46 m) | A tree was blown over and a water tank was damaged at a well site. |
| EF2 | WNW of Carter to Southern Elk City to WSW of Canute | Beckham, Washita | OK | 35.2402°N 99.555°W | 23:46–00:18 | 18 mi (29 km) | 1,000 yd (910 m) | 1 death – This rain-wrapped wedge tornado caused very high-end EF2 damage as it impacted the southern fringes of Elk City. Many homes at the Elk City Golf & County Club had their roofs ripped off and sustained collapse of some exterior walls. One small home collapsed, and several metal industrial buildings were heavily damaged or destroyed. Numerous vehicles were flipped and tossed, and one man was killed as his pickup truck was thrown 150 yards from a roadway and mangled. Elsewhere along the path, an oil derrick was toppled, several other homes sustained heavy damage, outbuildings were damaged or destroyed, and an irrigation pivot was overturned. Many trees and power poles were snapped along the path. 66 homes were destroyed, while 140 others were damaged. Three businesses were destroyed, and five others were damaged as well. 10 people were injured. |
| EF3 | E of Larned to NW of Hoisington | Pawnee, Barton | KS | 38.1987°N 99.0186°W | 00:59–01:41 | 26.64 mi (42.87 km) | 300 yd (270 m) | This strong tornado struck the town of Pawnee Rock, where a school building sustained considerable damage, trees were snapped, and homes had their roofs ripped off. High-end EF3 damage occurred to the west of Great Bend, where trees were denuded and debarked, a block-foundation farmhouse was completely leveled, and another farmhouse was left with only one corner standing. Several other homes were severely damaged along the path, some sustaining roof and exterior wall loss. Outbuildings were damaged or destroyed, and irrigation pivots were damaged as well. One person was injured. |
| EF0 | NNE of Parrish | Oneida | WI | 45.4706°N 89.3634°W | 01:12–01:13 | 0.33 mi (0.53 km) | 175 yd (160 m) | Several hundred pine trees were uprooted by this brief tornado. |
| EF0 | NNE of Susank | Barton | KS | 38.65°N 98.76°W | 01:48–01:50 | 0.34 mi (0.55 km) | 75 yd (69 m) | Brief tornado remained over open country and caused no damage. |

=== May 17 event ===
List of reported tornadoes – Wednesday, May 17, 2017
| EF# | Location | County / parish | State | Start coord. | Time (UTC) | Path length | Max. width | Summary |
|---|---|---|---|---|---|---|---|---|
| EF1 | NE of Edgar | Clay | NE | 40.4516°N 97.9389°W | 06:24–06:29 | 2.19 mi (3.52 km) | 50 yd (46 m) | Two farmsteads received damage to their outbuildings and trees. A few center irrigation pivots were also damaged, and tin was lofted into trees. |
| EF0 | NE of Alton | Sioux | IA | 43.02°N 95.97°W | 19:10–19:12 | 0.02 mi (0.032 km) | 10 yd (9.1 m) | A trained spotter reported a brief touchdown. No damage occurred. |
| EF0 | W of Matlock | Sioux | IA | 43.24°N 95.95°W | 19:42–19:44 | 0.02 mi (0.032 km) | 10 yd (9.1 m) | Tornado reported by a storm chaser. No damage occurred. |
| EF1 | WNW of Wisner | Cuming | NE | 42.0075°N 97.0187°W | 20:48–20:50 | 0.37 mi (0.60 km) | 50 yd (46 m) | A brief tornado damaged crops and destroyed outbuildings. One home sustained minor damage and had one exterior wall bowed out. |
| EF0 | Plainview | Wabasha | MN | 44.1631°N 92.1789°W | 21:29–21:30 | 0.79 mi (1.27 km) | 30 yd (27 m) | Isolated spots of minor damage occurred in town. The back side of a metal shed was blown down, part of roof was blown off of a storage building, and the batting cage at a baseball field was destroyed. |
| EF1 | W of Pleasant Plain | Jefferson, Washington | IA | 41.1453°N 91.9313°W | 22:16–22:20 | 3.22 mi (5.18 km) | 25 yd (23 m) | A small and fast-moving high-end EF1 tornado damaged outbuildings and trees. One outbuilding was completely destroyed with debris strewn downwind. |
| EF1 | W of North Bend | Trempealeau | WI | 44.0965°N 91.192°W | 22:21–22:25 | 1.06 mi (1.71 km) | 250 yd (230 m) | A brief tornado snapped trees and damaged farm buildings. |
| EF0 | WSW of Illinois City | Rock Island | IL | 41.3483°N 91.0521°W | 23:04–23:05 | 0.71 mi (1.14 km) | 25 yd (23 m) | A storm chaser videoed a brief tornado in an open field. No damage occurred. |
| EF0 | NE of Ridgeway | Winneshiek | IA | 43.3512°N 91.9043°W | 23:50–23:51 | 0.2 mi (0.32 km) | 30 yd (27 m) | A brief tornado damaged trees. |
| EF0 | Elgin | Wabasha | MN | 44.1286°N 92.2541°W | 00:35–00:36 | 0.26 mi (0.42 km) | 30 yd (27 m) | A brief tornado caused minor roof shingle and tree damage in Elgin. |
| EF1 | NE of Washington | Washington | IA | 41.3838°N 91.6021°W | 00:36–00:42 | 5.95 mi (9.58 km) | 40 yd (37 m) | A small, fast-moving tornado damaged or destroyed numerous outbuildings. Trees were snapped, power lines were downed, and a house had its windows blown out. |
| EF1 | NW of Donahue | Scott | IA | 41.7003°N 90.7228°W | 01:44–01:46 | 2.14 mi (3.44 km) | 25 yd (23 m) | Numerous trees were damaged, including a few rotten trees that were snapped. A home and a garage sustained roof damage. |
| EF1 | SE of Sherrard | Mercer, Henry | IL | 41.2447°N 90.5062°W | 02:00–02:09 | 8.11 mi (13.05 km) | 150 yd (140 m) | Numerous outbuildings, a few homes, and over 50 trees sustained damage. One home had partial roof loss, and debris was speared through the walls of another home. |
| EF1 | WNW of Hooppole | Henry | IL | 41.5468°N 89.9994°W | 02:44–02:47 | 2.06 mi (3.32 km) | 50 yd (46 m) | Damage was primarily confined to snapped branches and uprooted trees, though one outbuilding suffered roof damage. |
| EF2 | SSW of Galva | Henry | IL | 41.1533°N 90.0811°W | 03:20–03:21 | 1.29 mi (2.08 km) | 50 yd (46 m) | A small multiple-vortex tornado tore the roof off a home and blew out the structures doors, injuring one inside. Multiple trees and another home were also damaged. |
| EF1 | S of Poplar Grove to NW of Harvard | Boone, McHenry | IL | 42.3341°N 88.8221°W | 03:21–03:34 | 10.3 mi (16.6 km) | 100 yd (91 m) | A large outbuilding was destroyed and others were damaged. Numerous trees were snapped and uprooted, and a garage collapsed. |

=== May 18 event ===
List of reported tornadoes – Thursday, May 18, 2017
| EF# | Location | County / parish | State | Start coord. | Time (UTC) | Path length | Max. width | Summary |
|---|---|---|---|---|---|---|---|---|
| EFU | NW of Duke | Jackson | OK | 34.677°N 99.594°W | 19:02–19:05 | 0.7 mi (1.1 km) | 50 yd (46 m) | A brief tornado was reported by local media. No damage occurred. |
| EF0 | N of Duke | Jackson | OK | 34.695°N 99.575°W | 19:11–19:16 | 1.2 mi (1.9 km) | 75 yd (69 m) | Large cone tornado remained mainly over open country, though one house sustained light damage. |
| EFU | NE of Delhi | Otero | CO | 37.7113°N 103.8885°W | 20:29–20:36 | 2.88 mi (4.63 km) | 75 yd (69 m) | Storm chasers and an off-duty NWS employee observed a tornado which caused no damage. |
| EFU | NNW of Cloud Chief | Washita | OK | 35.287°N 98.859°W | 20:40–20:41 | 0.5 mi (0.80 km) | 100 yd (91 m) | Tornado remained over open country and caused no damage. |
| EF0 | S of Seward | Stafford | KS | 38.158°N 98.799°W | 21:03–21:04 | 0.58 mi (0.93 km) | 50 yd (46 m) | Weak, brief tornado remained over open country and caused no damage. |
| EFU | S of Vernon | Wilbarger | TX | 34.054°N 99.282°W | 21:04 | 0.2 mi (0.32 km) | 50 yd (46 m) | Tornado remained over open country and caused no damage. |
| EFU | WSW of Seiling | Dewey | OK | 36.127°N 99.022°W | 21:11 | 0.2 mi (0.32 km) | 50 yd (46 m) | Tornado remained over open country and caused no damage. |
| EF0 | NW of Bloom | Ford | KS | 37.5154°N 99.9445°W | 21:14–21:18 | 0.49 mi (0.79 km) | 50 yd (46 m) | Landspout tornado remained over open country and caused no damage. |
| EF0 | S of Wilroads | Ford | KS | 37.5904°N 99.8839°W | 21:18–21:21 | 0.35 mi (0.56 km) | 50 yd (46 m) | Landspout tornado developed as the previous one was dissipating. No damage occurred. |
| EFU | SE of Weatherford | Custer | OK | 35.5095°N 98.6749°W | 21:20 | 0.2 mi (0.32 km) | 30 yd (27 m) | Tornado remained over open country and caused no damage. |
| EF0 | NW of Chester | Woodward, Major | OK | 36.226°N 98.974°W | 21:23–21:36 | 8.6 mi (13.8 km) | 200 yd (180 m) | Large multiple-vortex tornado caused roof and siding damage to two homes. Tree damage also occurred. |
| EF0 | E of Great Bend Municipal Airport | Barton | KS | 38.35°N 98.82°W | 21:30–21:31 | 0.11 mi (0.18 km) | 50 yd (46 m) | A brief tornado touched down over open fields. No damage occurred. |
| EF0 | SW of Greenfield | Blaine | OK | 35.58°N 98.626°W | 21:33 | 0.2 mi (0.32 km) | 50 yd (46 m) | An outbuilding and the roof of a house were damaged. |
| EF0 | NNE of Seward | Stafford | KS | 38.238°N 98.769°W | 21:33–21:34 | 0.56 mi (0.90 km) | 50 yd (46 m) | Weak, brief tornado remained over open country and caused no damage. |
| EFU | N of Chester | Major | OK | 36.3647°N 98.92°W | 21:37 | 0.2 mi (0.32 km) | 30 yd (27 m) | A brief tornado was reported by local media. No damage occurred. |
| EFU | SW of Corn | Washita | OK | 35.309°N 98.846°W | 21:40 | 0.3 mi (0.48 km) | 50 yd (46 m) | Tornado remained over open country and caused no damage. |
| EFU | NNW of Haynesville | Wichita | TX | 34.121°N 98.929°W | 21:48–21:50 | 1.2 mi (1.9 km) | 50 yd (46 m) | Tornado remained over open country and caused no damage. |
| EF1 | WSW of Waynoka | Major, Woods | OK | 36.435°N 98.928°W | 21:49–22:07 | 9 mi (14 km) | 200 yd (180 m) | Tornado mainly moved over rural areas, though the roof of a barn was damaged at one location. |
| EF2 | NNW of Haynesville | Wichita | TX | 34.133°N 98.894°W | 21:54–21:58 | 2 mi (3.2 km) | 100 yd (91 m) | Tornado damaged several metal power line truss towers, a few of which completely collapsed. |
| EFU | NW of Alva | Woods | OK | 36.85°N 98.695°W | 21:57 | 0.2 mi (0.32 km) | 50 yd (46 m) | Tornado remained over open country and caused no damage. |
| EF0 | ESE of Greenfield | Canadian, Blaine | OK | 35.6965°N 98.3128°W | 22:05–22:10 | 3.42 mi (5.50 km) | 50 yd (46 m) | Homes sustained roof, siding, and shingle damage. A power pole was broken and an irrigation pivot was overturned. Two barns also sustained damage. |
| EF0 | N of Great Bend Municipal Airport | Barton | KS | 38.39°N 98.85°W | 22:23–22:24 | 0.21 mi (0.34 km) | 50 yd (46 m) | A brief tornado touched down over open fields. No damage occurred. |
| EF0 | NE of Great Bend Municipal Airport | Barton | KS | 38.38°N 98.83°W | 22:49–22:51 | 0.62 mi (1.00 km) | 50 yd (46 m) | A brief tornado touched down over open fields. No damage occurred. |
| EF0 | SE of Alta Vista | Wabaunsee | KS | 38.8495°N 96.4537°W | 22:52 | 0.01 mi (0.016 km) | 25 yd (23 m) | A brief tornado touched down over an open field. No damage occurred. |
| EF0 | W of Salina Regional Airport | Saline | KS | 38.8°N 97.67°W | 23:31–23:33 | 0.34 mi (0.55 km) | 50 yd (46 m) | A rain-wrapped tornado remained over open fields. No damage occurred. |
| EF0 | W of Duncan | Stephens | OK | 34.4619°N 98.0483°W | 00:00 | 0.2 mi (0.32 km) | 50 yd (46 m) | An outbuilding and some trees were damaged. |
| EF1 | SE of Cross Plains | Brown | TX | 32.0353°N 99.1185°W | 00:41–00:55 | 3.3 mi (5.3 km) | 450 yd (410 m) | A home had roof decking lifted off, small sheds were destroyed, and metal roof panels were lifted off of barns. Numerous tree limbs and some tree trunks were snapped, and debris was blown over 250 yards (230 m). |
| EF0 | SE of May | Brown | TX | 32.011°N 98.9605°W | 01:04–01:06 | 0.42 mi (0.68 km) | 50 yd (46 m) | Brief tornado remained over open country and caused no damage. |
| EF1 | SE of May | Brown | TX | 31.942°N 98.8591°W | 01:38–02:00 | 4.36 mi (7.02 km) | 880 yd (800 m) | A mobile home's roof was torn off, a chicken coop was destroyed, and sheet metal was ripped off of a barn and tossed over 100 yards (91 m). Trees were uprooted, snapped, or had branches snapped, and outdoor lawn furniture was damaged. |
| EF0 | Stonewall | Pontotoc | OK | 34.65°N 96.5306°W | 02:13–02:14 | 0.6 mi (0.97 km) | 75 yd (69 m) | Roof and tree damage occurred in town. |
| EF1 | ENE of Rocky to SSW of Cloud Chief | Washita | OK | 35.195°N 98.971°W | 02:29–02:37 | 6.05 mi (9.74 km) | 100 yd (91 m) | A barn was destroyed and numerous trees and power lines were downed. |
| EF1 | NE of Ashland | Pittsburg | OK | 34.8051°N 96.0686°W | 02:46–02:54 | 8.2 mi (13.2 km) | 1,000 yd (910 m) | Power poles and numerous trees were snapped by this large wedge tornado. An outbuilding and a home were damaged as well. |
| EF1 | NW of Savanna | Pittsburg | OK | 34.8403°N 95.9151°W | 02:56–03:02 | 4.6 mi (7.4 km) | 1,000 yd (910 m) | Numerous trees were snapped or uprooted by this large wedge tornado. |
| EF2 | NW of Hanna to SSW of Stidham | McIntosh | OK | 35.2461°N 95.95°W | 02:57–03:09 | 13.7 mi (22.0 km) | 850 yd (780 m) | A large outbuilding was destroyed, numerous trees were snapped or uprooted, a home was damaged, and a metal high-voltage truss tower was toppled. |
| EF1 | SW of Stidham to Lake Eufaula | McIntosh | OK | 35.3578°N 95.7225°W | 03:11–03:15 | 4.7 mi (7.6 km) | 500 yd (460 m) | A mobile home and outbuildings were destroyed, several homes had their roofs damaged, power poles were toppled, and numerous trees were snapped or uprooted. |
| EF1 | ENE of Stidham | McIntosh | OK | 35.3761°N 95.6591°W | 03:15–03:19 | 3.8 mi (6.1 km) | 450 yd (410 m) | An outbuilding was destroyed, a home was damaged, numerous trees were snapped or uprooted, and power poles were blown down. |
| EF1 | E of Checotah | McIntosh | OK | 35.4664°N 95.4911°W | 03:25–03:32 | 8.8 mi (14.2 km) | 600 yd (550 m) | Privacy fences were downed, homes were damaged, and trees were snapped or outbuildings. Outbuildings were damaged or destroyed and power poles were toppled. |
| EF1 | S of Redbird | Wagoner | OK | 35.7882°N 95.6194°W | 03:30–03:36 | 5 mi (8.0 km) | 500 yd (460 m) | A center pivot irrigation system was destroyed and several power poles and trees were snapped. |
| EF1 | SW of Braggs | Muskogee | OK | 35.5643°N 95.3315°W | 03:35–03:40 | 5.3 mi (8.5 km) | 900 yd (820 m) | Numerous trees were snapped or uprooted, outbuildings were damaged, and power poles were toppled. |
| EF1 | Western Muskogee | Muskogee | OK | 35.7300°N 95.4173°W | 03:37–03:39 | 2 mi (3.2 km) | 400 yd (370 m) | This tornado began at the Eagle Crest Golf Club and moved into the western part of Muskogee. Several homes in town were damaged and numerous trees were snapped or uprooted. Windows were broken at a hotel, and a business had part of its roof peeled back. |
| EF1 | SSW of Porter to Western Wagoner | Wagoner | OK | 35.8548°N 95.5275°W | 03:39–03:52 | 10.3 mi (16.6 km) | 700 yd (640 m) | Homes were damaged, mobile homes and RV campers were rolled, outbuildings were destroyed, power poles were blown down, and trees were snapped or uprooted. Minor tree limb damage occurred in the western part of Wagoner before the tornado dissipated. |
| EF2 | Northern Muskogee | Muskogee | OK | 35.7583°N 95.3846°W | 03:40–03:43 | 2.8 mi (4.5 km) | 400 yd (370 m) | This strong tornado moved through the northern part of Muskogee, causing extensive damage. Many trees were snapped and uprooted, a metal-frame industrial building was completely destroyed, large apartment buildings had their roofs torn off, and homes sustained lesser damage. A strip mall sustained damage and had windows blown out, power poles were snapped, and outbuilding structures were destroyed as well. |
| EF1 | SW of Braggs | Muskogee | OK | 35.6183°N 95.2472°W | 03:41–03:45 | 3.7 mi (6.0 km) | 350 yd (320 m) | Trees were uprooted and numerous large limbs were snapped, outbuildings were damaged, and power poles were downed. |
| EF1 | W of Fort Gibson to NNW of Hulbert | Muskogee, Wagoner, Cherokee | OK | 35.8073°N 95.3392°W | 03:45–03:59 | 16.6 mi (26.7 km) | 650 yd (590 m) | A tornado snapped or uprooted numerous trees along its path. |
| EF1 | SE of Wagoner to SE of Chouteau | Wagoner, Mayes | OK | 35.9150°N 95.3299°W | 03:48–04:05 | 12.7 mi (20.4 km) | 650 yd (590 m) | Homes were damaged, several boats docks were destroyed on the shore of Fort Gibson Lake, and outbuildings were destroyed. Numerous trees were snapped or uprooted along the path. |
| EF1 | SW of Peggs | Cherokee, Mayes | OK | 36.0169°N 95.1727°W | 04:01–04:07 | 5.8 mi (9.3 km) | 800 yd (730 m) | A tornado snapped or uprooted numerous trees. |

=== May 19 event ===
List of reported tornadoes – Friday, May 19, 2017
| EF# | Location | County / parish | State | Start coord. | Time (UTC) | Path length | Max. width | Summary |
|---|---|---|---|---|---|---|---|---|
| EF0 | SW of Bentonville | Benton | AR | 36.3207°N 94.2529°W | 05:07–05:09 | 2 mi (3.2 km) | 225 yd (206 m) | A number of homes sustained roof damage, numerous large tree limbs were snapped, and several power poles were downed. |
| EF1 | E of Jane | McDonald | MO | 36.5036°N 94.2079°W | 05:23–05:25 | 1 mi (1.6 km) | 100 yd (91 m) | A brief tornado snapped or uprooted numerous trees. Multiple homes suffered roof damage and/or had windows blown out. One home lost half of its roof. |
| EF0 | SE of Shell Knob | Barry | MO | 36.5972°N 93.5985°W | 06:04–06:05 | 0.12 mi (0.19 km) | 100 yd (91 m) | A brief tornado damaged multiple docks and uprooted trees. |
| EF0 | Western Branson | Taney | MO | 36.6429°N 93.265°W | 06:28–06:29 | 0.25 mi (0.40 km) | 75 yd (69 m) | A brief tornado damaged a hotel and an outlet mall, injuring one person. |
| EF1 | Rockaway Beach to N of Taneyville | Taney | MO | 36.6995°N 93.1595°W | 06:30–06:40 | 8.7 mi (14.0 km) | 200 yd (180 m) | Numerous trees were uprooted along the path. |
| EF0 | Turners | Greene | MO | 37.1726°N 93.1647°W | 06:54–06:56 | 2.49 mi (4.01 km) | 200 yd (180 m) | Numerous trees were uprooted in Turners, some of which fell on homes. |
| EF0 | Chadwick | Christian | MO | 36.9149°N 93.0654°W | 07:00–07:03 | 3 mi (4.8 km) | 500 yd (460 m) | Numerous trees were uprooted in Chadwick, some of which fell on homes. |
| EF1 | Forkners Hill | Webster | MO | 37.4683°N 92.9169°W | 07:15–07:17 | 2 mi (3.2 km) | 300 yd (270 m) | Several structures and homes sustained minor or moderate damage, an outbuilding was destroyed, and numerous trees were snapped or uprooted. |
| EF0 | N of Dawson | Wright | MO | 37.27°N 92.31°W | 08:00–08:01 | 0.25 mi (0.40 km) | 50 yd (46 m) | Roof damage occurred to one residence and large tree limbs were broken. |
| EF0 | Northeastern Thayer | Oregon | MO | 36.5307°N 91.544°W | 08:12–08:13 | 0.75 mi (1.21 km) | 300 yd (270 m) | Numerous trees were damaged and uprooted. Some homes were damaged. |
| EF1 | E of Williamsburg | Callaway | MO | 38.9166°N 91.6829°W | 09:15–09:16 | 1.58 mi (2.54 km) | 50 yd (46 m) | A barn was destroyed while two others were damaged. Two vehicles were flipped, a power pole was snapped, and some debris was tossed nearly a mile downwind. |
| EF0 | E of New Florence | Montgomery | MO | 38.8952°N 91.4450°W | 09:23–09:28 | 3.98 mi (6.41 km) | 75 yd (69 m) | Two buildings at a Missouri Department of Transportation location were damaged, while 12 garage doors were also removed. The material was tossed into power lines, causing one power pole to snap. A home had its garage door damaged and porch pillars shifted off the foundation. Three barns sustained roof and door damage. |
| EF1 | NE of Hart | McDonald, Newton | MO | 36.76°N 94.56°W | 19:55–19:57 | 2.03 mi (3.27 km) | 10 yd (9.1 m) | A home and several outbuildings sustained roof damage and trees were uprooted. |
| EF1 | Northern Neosho | Newton | MO | 36.8732°N 94.376°W | 20:10–20:14 | 4.1 mi (6.6 km) | 300 yd (270 m) | Tornado touched down in the northern part of Neosho and moved northeast. Numerous trees were damaged, some of which were snapped or uprooted. A few homes were damaged as well. |
| EF1 | SW of Sulphur | Crawford | IN | 38.217°N 86.493°W | 20:22–20:24 | 0.23 mi (0.37 km) | 50 yd (46 m) | An old RV had its roof removed, with debris thrown up to 100 yards (91 m), another RV was tipped over, and the bed of a pickup truck, which was not attached, was thrown about 150 yards (140 m). A barn had one of its doors blown out and suffered significant roof damage, with debris thrown 125 yards (114 m) into the auto body shop parking lot, and a single-wide trailer sustained roof damage. An auto body shop sustained roof damage, vehicles in the parking lot had several windows smashed by debris, and trees were knocked down or snapped. |
| EFU | NW of Winters | Runnels | TX | 31.97°N 99.99°W | 20:23–20:25 | 0.03 mi (0.048 km) | 30 yd (27 m) | Thin rope tornado remained over open country and caused no damage. |
| EF0 | WSW of Medicine Lodge | Barber | KS | 37.24°N 98.682°W | 20:37–20:40 | 0.38 mi (0.61 km) | 50 yd (46 m) | Tornado remained mainly over open country. Some minor tree damage may have occurred, but survey crews were unable to access affected areas. |
| EF1 | SE of Stotts City | Lawrence | MO | 37.0546°N 93.9592°W | 20:42–20:46 | 4.23 mi (6.81 km) | 300 yd (270 m) | Multiple large barns were damaged or destroyed, a couple of outbuildings were damaged, and several trees were uprooted. A car was blown off of the interstate and had a piece of wood driven through its windshield. |
| EF0 | NNW of Medicine Lodge | Barber | KS | 37.328°N 98.617°W | 20:53–21:00 | 2.98 mi (4.80 km) | 150 yd (140 m) | This tornado appeared to be fairly strong, and may have caused tree damage. However, damage surveyors were unable to access the affected areas. |
| EF0 | Northwestern Miller | Lawrence | MO | 37.2173°N 93.8474°W | 20:57–20:58 | 1 mi (1.6 km) | 100 yd (91 m) | The town baseball stadium was damaged, and trees were uprooted or had branches broken off. |
| EF0 | SE of Everton | Dade | MO | 37.2993°N 93.6678°W | 21:05–21:06 | 0.86 mi (1.38 km) | 100 yd (91 m) | Trees were uprooted. |
| EF0 | NE of Sawyer | Pratt | KS | 37.524°N 98.651°W | 21:11–21:16 | 2.22 mi (3.57 km) | 50 yd (46 m) | Tornado remained over open country, causing no damage. |
| EF0 | NE of Everton | Dade | MO | 37.3545°N 93.675°W | 21:12–21:13 | 0.47 mi (0.76 km) | 75 yd (69 m) | Several trees were uprooted. |
| EF0 | ESE of Isabel to SSE of Cairo | Barber, Pratt | KS | 37.466°N 98.536°W | 21:14–21:24 | 4.5 mi (7.2 km) | 75 yd (69 m) | Weak tornado remained over open country and caused no damage. |
| EF0 | WNW of Walnut Grove | Greene, Polk | MO | 37.4219°N 93.5928°W | 21:19–21:20 | 0.58 mi (0.93 km) | 100 yd (91 m) | Several trees were uprooted and an outbuilding sustained roof damage. |
| EF0 | N of Nashville | Kingman | KS | 37.54°N 98.42°W | 21:22–21:23 | 0.21 mi (0.34 km) | 50 yd (46 m) | Brief tornado over an open field. No damage occurred. |
| EF0 | N of Zenda | Kingman | KS | 37.4666°N 98.2811°W | 21:53–21:54 | 0.32 mi (0.51 km) | 50 yd (46 m) | Brief tornado damaged the roof of a metal barn. |
| EF0 | N of Kingman | Kingman | KS | 37.68°N 98.11°W | 22:10–22:12 | 0.31 mi (0.50 km) | 50 yd (46 m) | Brief tornado over an open field. Damage occurred. |
| EF0 | ESE of Pretty Prairie | Reno | KS | 37.75°N 97.94°W | 22:32–22:34 | 0.68 mi (1.09 km) | 50 yd (46 m) | Brief tornado over an open field. No damage occurred. |
| EF0 | E of Pretty Prairie | Reno | KS | 37.6839°N 97.8442°W | 22:37–22:39 | 0.64 mi (1.03 km) | 50 yd (46 m) | Brief tornado over an open field. No damage occurred. |
| EFU | SW of Windthorst | Archer | TX | 33.549°N 98.467°W | 23:00–23:02 | 0.68 mi (1.09 km) | 50 yd (46 m) | Tornado remained over open country and caused no damage. |
| EF1 | Northern Wardsville | Cole | MO | 38.4982°N 92.1846°W | 23:27–23:29 | 0.95 mi (1.53 km) | 75 yd (69 m) | One home sustained significant roof damage, another sustained minor roof damage, and two large trees fell on a third home. Trees were damaged, some of which were snapped or uprooted. |
| EF0 | SSW of Bala | Clay | KS | 39.2557°N 96.9901°W | 00:15–00:16 | 0.02 mi (0.032 km) | 20 yd (18 m) | Brief tornado caused minor tree damage. |
| EFU | W of Springer | Carter | OK | 34.31°N 97.2101°W | 00:22 | 0.2 mi (0.32 km) | 50 yd (46 m) | Tornado remained over open country and caused no damage. |
| EFU | WNW of Springer | Carter | OK | 34.3322°N 97.2048°W | 00:24 | 0.2 mi (0.32 km) | 50 yd (46 m) | Tornado remained over open country and caused no damage. |
| EF0 | WSW of Trickham | Coleman | TX | 31.5601°N 99.2855°W | 00:27–00:29 | 0.08 mi (0.13 km) | 25 yd (23 m) | Tornado briefly kicked up debris but caused no noticeable damage. |
| EFU | NNW of Springer | Carter | OK | 34.3501°N 97.1601°W | 00:31–00:33 | 0.2 mi (0.32 km) | 50 yd (46 m) | Tornado remained over open country and caused no damage. |
| EFU | NNE of Springer | Carter | OK | 34.3635°N 97.1132°W | 00:47–00:50 | 2 mi (3.2 km) | 400 yd (370 m) | Tornado remained over open country and caused no damage. |
| EF0 | WNW of Strong City | Chase | KS | 38.4°N 96.58°W | 00:48–00:49 | 0.21 mi (0.34 km) | 50 yd (46 m) | Brief tornado over an open field. No damage occurred. |
| EF0 | W of Dunlap | Morris | KS | 38.58°N 96.4626°W | 01:09 | 0.01 mi (0.016 km) | 25 yd (23 m) | Rope tornado remained over open country. No damage occurred. |
| EF1 | WNW of Elmdale | Chase | KS | 38.411°N 96.789°W | 01:25–01:36 | 0.8 mi (1.3 km) | 60 yd (55 m) | A machine shed and concrete footings were lifted and thrown into a nearby tree and a few cemetery headstones were moved slightly. A large tree was split down the middle, many large tree branches were snapped, and other minor tree damage occurred. |
| EF0 | NW of Bushong | Lyon | KS | 38.6602°N 96.2631°W | 01:38 | 0.01 mi (0.016 km) | 25 yd (23 m) | Tornado remained over open country and caused no damage. |
| EFU | NW of Tishomingo | Johnston | OK | 34.267°N 96.701°W | 02:32–02:34 | 1.5 mi (2.4 km) | 50 yd (46 m) | Tornado remained over open country and caused no damage. |
| EFU | SW of Bromide | Johnston | OK | 34.3381°N 96.5992°W | 02:44–02:49 | 2 mi (3.2 km) | 50 yd (46 m) | Tornado remained over open country and caused no damage. |
| EFU | NNW of Milburn to SW of Bromide | Johnston | OK | 34.347°N 96.6036°W | 02:56–03:08 | 6 mi (9.7 km) | 50 yd (46 m) | Tornado remained over open country and caused no damage. |
| EFU | NE of Bromide | Coal | OK | 34.4251°N 96.4838°W | 03:13–03:20 | 3 mi (4.8 km) | 50 yd (46 m) | Tornado remained over open country and caused no damage. |

=== May 20 event ===
List of reported tornadoes – Saturday, May 20, 2017
| EF# | Location | County / parish | State | Start coord. | Time (UTC) | Path length | Max. width | Summary |
|---|---|---|---|---|---|---|---|---|
| EF1 | SE of Wirt | Jefferson | IN | 38.7890°N 85.426°W | 23:10–23:11 | 0.16 mi (0.26 km) | 30 yd (27 m) | An abandoned farm house was damaged, a house was covered by falling trees, and a camper was rolled three times and destroyed. Trees were snapped and uprooted as well. The inflow winds into the tornado pulled siding off of homes and moved light objects several hundred feet. |
| EF0 | SSW of Wolcott | Benton, White | IN | 40.6566°N 87.0997°W | 23:34–23:39 | 1.22 mi (1.96 km) | 50 yd (46 m) | A small building was knocked down, a small boat on a trailer was flipped, and a small tree was uprooted. |
| EF1 | W of Thorntown | Boone | IN | 40.134°N 86.6956°W | 23:40–23:41 | 0.08 mi (0.13 km) | 40 yd (37 m) | Brief tornado removed a large portion of a barn's roof and tossed it several hundred yards into a field. |
| EF1 | Forest | Clinton | IN | 40.3602°N 86.3514°W | 00:40–00:46 | 1.45 mi (2.33 km) | 40 yd (37 m) | One wall of the Forest volunteer fire station was collapsed and the roof was uplifted, a pole barn had its roof uplifted and its walls partially collapsed, a residence sustained minor roof damage, and trees were uprooted. |

=== May 21 event ===
List of reported tornadoes – Sunday, May 21, 2017
| EF# | Location | County / Parish | State | Start Coord. | Time (UTC) | Path length | Max width |
|---|---|---|---|---|---|---|---|
| EF0 | NE of Fulshear | Waller, Fort Bend | TX | 29.77°N 95.95°W | 19:55–20:10 | 7.23 mi (11.64 km) | 30 yd (27 m) |
| EF0 | Tornado observed by law enforcement. | | | | | | |
| EF0 | ESE of Santa Rosa | Guadalupe | NM | 34.8623°N 104.2504°W | 00:29–00:38 | 2.23 mi (3.59 km) | 50 yd (46 m) |
| EF0 | A storm chaser reported a tornado. | | | | | | |

=== May 22 event ===
List of reported tornadoes – Monday, May 22, 2017
| EF# | Location | County / Parish | State | Start Coord. | Time (UTC) | Path length | Max width |
|---|---|---|---|---|---|---|---|
| EF0 | ENE of Holiday Lakes | Brazoria | TX | 29.2211°N 95.48°W | 14:35–14:37 | 0.17 mi (0.27 km) | 20 yd (18 m) |
| EF0 | A home's back porch roof was damaged, a pump house was destroyed, a trailer was damaged, and several trees were toppled. | | | | | | |
| EF0 | Galveston | Galveston | TX | 29.2281°N 94.8957°W | 16:45–16:46 | 0.1 mi (0.16 km) | 20 yd (18 m) |
| EF0 | A Holiday Inn had its windows blown out and lattice damaged by a waterspout that moved ashore. | | | | | | |

=== May 23 event ===
List of reported tornadoes – Tuesday, May 23, 2017
| EF# | Location | County / Parish | State | Start Coord. | Time (UTC) | Path length | Max width |
|---|---|---|---|---|---|---|---|
| EF0 | SE of Coleman | Randolph | GA | 31.6552°N 84.8836°W | 15:46–16:00 | 10.18 mi (16.38 km) | 50 yd (46 m) |
| EF0 | Damage primarily limited to trees. One home sustained minor roof damage and a carport collapsed. | | | | | | |
| EF1 | SE of Coleman | Lee, Sumter | GA | 31.854°N 84.2359°W | 16:56–17:16 | 10.63 mi (17.11 km) | 100 yd (91 m) |
| EF1 | Two homes sustained minor roof damage, and trees were damaged. | | | | | | |
| EF1 | NNE of Arabi | Crisp | GA | 31.8667°N 83.7481°W | 17:46–17:54 | 5.22 mi (8.40 km) | 150 yd (140 m) |
| EF1 | A semi tractor-trailer was blown onto a car, resulting in two minor injuries. Numerous trees were snapped, a house had most of its roof ripped off, and two mobile homes were blown off their blocks. Two additional homes were damaged, one by the tornado and a second by a fallen tree. | | | | | | |
| EF1 | S of Pitts | Wilcox | GA | 31.8956°N 83.5756°W | 18:00–18:03 | 1.57 mi (2.53 km) | 50 yd (46 m) |
| EF1 | At least 100 pecan trees were snapped and shredded. A section of a large chicken house was destroyed. | | | | | | |
| EF0 | NW of Parkton | Robeson | NC | 34.9156°N 79.0695°W | 19:38–19:43 | 2.24 mi (3.60 km) | 30 yd (27 m) |
| EF0 | A metal-topped farm building sustained severe damage, the roof of a church was uplifted, and a few trees were uprooted. Several homes sustained minor damage. An outbuilding was destroyed. | | | | | | |
| EF1 | Autryville | Sampson | NC | 35.0°N 78.64°W | 20:38–21:17 | 13.74 mi (22.11 km) | 100 yd (91 m) |
| EF1 | A high-end EF1 tornado that touched down multiple times along its intermittent path first began on the west side of Autryville, destroying one mobile home and ripping the roof off another. The Autryville Volunteer Fire Department was destroyed as its garage doors were blown in, roof was uplifted, and cinder block walls were collapsed. Several homes were damaged, a vacant turkey house was destroyed, and numerous trees and power poles were snapped. One minor injury occurred. | | | | | | |
| EF0 | WNW of Prophetstown | Whiteside | IL | 41.6895°N 90.01°W | 20:52–20:53 | 0.26 mi (0.42 km) | 15 yd (14 m) |
| EF0 | An eyewitness watched a tornado cross a road. | | | | | | |
| EF0 | NW of Assumption | Christian | IL | 39.5299°N 89.0704°W | 21:30–21:31 | 0.1 mi (0.16 km) | 10 yd (9.1 m) |
| EF0 | A weak landspout tornado briefly touched down in a field. | | | | | | |
| EF2 | Wilmington Island to Fort Pulaski | Chatham | GA | 31.9849°N 80.9971°W | 21:53–22:03 | 7.49 mi (12.05 km) | 300 yd (270 m) |
| EF2 | 3 deaths – A tornado began on the southern end of Wilmington Island, where over 30 homes sustained minor to moderate damage from many fallen trees. One home sustained direct damage from the vortex and had its sunroom roof ripped off. It continued to the Fort Pulaski National Monument, where the visitor center had its concrete walls and roof shifted and buckled. A smaller building nearby sustained similar damage, and two vehicles in the parking lot were pushed and rolled. After entering the Atlantic Ocean as a waterspout, it capsized the large fishing vessel Miss Debbie. A multi-day search and rescue operation by the Coast Guard proved fruitless and the crew of three was presumed dead on May 27. | | | | | | |
| EF1 | NE of Fairfield | Tyrrell | NC | 35.706°N 76.132°W | 22:16–22:17 | 0.6 mi (0.97 km) | 40 yd (37 m) |
| EF1 | Several trees were snapped or downed, wheat crop was flattened, and a small barn sustained metal roof damage. | | | | | | |
| EF0 | NNE of Elgin | Bastrop | TX | 30.395°N 97.371°W | 22:37–22:39 | 1.81 mi (2.91 km) | 200 yd (180 m) |
| EF0 | A shed was displaced off its foundation and flipped. A business sustained extensive damage, the metal roof was ripped off a large barn, and a well-built home's roof sustained damage. Multiple pieces of splintered wood was driven into the ground in a field. Several cattle and a bull were thrown 1,500 ft (500 yd). An old wooden barn was completely destroyed, and another structure was damaged. | | | | | | |
| EF0 | N of Maquon | Knox | IL | 40.8137°N 90.1668°W | 01:05–01:06 | 0.15 mi (0.24 km) | 10 yd (9.1 m) |
| EF0 | A weak landspout tornado briefly touched down in a field. | | | | | | |

=== May 24 event ===
List of reported tornadoes – Wednesday, May 24, 2017
| EF# | Location | County / Parish | State | Start Coord. | Time (UTC) | Path length | Max width |
|---|---|---|---|---|---|---|---|
| EFU | SSE of Crescent Beach | St. Johns | FL | 29.6963°N 81.2297°W | 12:53–12:54 | 0.64 mi (1.03 km) | 25 yd (23 m) |
| EFU | A Skywarn spotter witnessed a weak tornado that caused no damage. | | | | | | |
| EF1 | NE of Dalton | Whitfield | GA | 34.8186°N 84.9512°W | 13:45–13:49 | 1.61 mi (2.59 km) | 200 yd (180 m) |
| EF1 | Numerous large trees were snapped or uprooted. A camper was also rolled about 20 yd (18 m). | | | | | | |
| EF0 | E of Resaca | Gordon | GA | 34.5847°N 84.9251°W | 14:47–14:48 | 0.28 mi (0.45 km) | 90 yd (82 m) |
| EF0 | Several large trees were snapped or uprooted. | | | | | | |
| EF0 | ENE of Resaca | Gordon | GA | 34.5984°N 84.8888°W | 14:50–14:51 | 0.32 mi (0.51 km) | 90 yd (82 m) |
| EF0 | A home and a small barn sustained roof damage, and several large trees were snapped or uprooted. | | | | | | |
| EF0 | WNW of Ellijay | Gilmer | GA | 34.7295°N 84.6111°W | 15:16–15:17 | 0.08 mi (0.13 km) | 30 yd (27 m) |
| EF0 | Several large trees were snapped or uprooted. | | | | | | |
| EF0 | NE of Blue Ridge | Fannin | GA | 34.8801°N 84.2944°W | 15:43–15:44 | 0.13 mi (0.21 km) | 35 yd (32 m) |
| EF0 | Several large trees were snapped or uprooted. | | | | | | |
| EF0 | NE of Lebanon | Smith | TN | 36.28°N 86.12°W | 16:36–16:39 | 2.1 mi (3.4 km) | 75 yd (69 m) |
| EF0 | Two barns were lifted and destroyed and dozens of trees were snapped or uprooted. | | | | | | |
| EF0 | SW of Dublin | Laurens | GA | 32.5133°N 82.9802°W | 18:05–18:10 | 2.27 mi (3.65 km) | 240 yd (220 m) |
| EF0 | Some metal trim was blown off a mobile home, a small metal carport was collapsed, and dozens of trees were snapped or uprooted. | | | | | | |
| EF1 | WNW of Saluda | Saluda | SC | 33.99°N 81.88°W | 18:40–18:47 | 2.88 mi (4.63 km) | 75 yd (69 m) |
| EF1 | Sheet metal was lifted off the roof of a small outbuilding, and numerous trees were snapped or uprooted. | | | | | | |
| EF2 | W of Saluda to SE of Prosperity | Saluda, Newberry | SC | 34.1058°N 81.6403°W | 19:04–19:20 | 12.01 mi (19.33 km) | 250 yd (230 m) |
| EF2 | Numerous trees were snapped or uprooted, including several that were downed on homes and vehicles. Treetops were snapped off and thrown up to 30 yd (27 m) away. Several masonry outbuildings had their walls blown out, and several other outbuildings were displaced up to 20 yd (18 m). | | | | | | |
| EF0 | E of Troutman | Iredell | NC | 35.707°N 80.834°W | 19:26–19:29 | 1.13 mi (1.82 km) | 50 yd (46 m) |
| EF0 | Several homes and a storage building sustained minor structural damage. Multiple trees were uprooted. | | | | | | |
| EF2 | ENE of Statesville | Iredell | NC | 35.798°N 80.783°W | 19:41–19:48 | 3.2 mi (5.1 km) | 100 yd (91 m) |
| EF2 | Fencing was blown in multiple directions, a brick home had its roof ripped off and interior walls collapsed, and over 100 trees were downed. Tree limbs were impaled into another home while other houses exhibited mud splattering. A total of 15 to 20 homes in all sustained at least minor damage. Tornado touched down two separate times along a discontinuous path. | | | | | | |
| EF2 | SE of Yadkinville | Davie, Yadkin | NC | 36.0230°N 80.618°W | 20:16–20:23 | 5.94 mi (9.56 km) | 225 yd (206 m) |
| EF2 | A tornado began in Davie County, snapping or downing approximately 100 trees, demolishing a storage shed, damaging a home's roof, and destroying a mobile home; the mobile home's occupant was tossed but survived. In Yadkin County, a tree limb was blown into a mobile home, injuring the occupant. Approximately 45 homes and other structures sustained at least partial damage. A local elementary school sustained heavy damage, with gymnasium walls collapsed and vehicles flipped in the parking lot. | | | | | | |
| EF1 | SSW of Monroe, NC | Lancaster (SC), Union (NC) | SC, NC | 34.8103°N 80.6373°W | 20:19–20:35 | 8.05 mi (12.96 km) | 50 yd (46 m) |
| EF1 | A few structures were damaged, most notably a barn that had its sides and most of its roof ripped off. Trees were damaged. | | | | | | |
| EF0 | NE of Adel | Cook | GA | 31.1661°N 83.3577°W | 20:48–20:53 | 1.12 mi (1.80 km) | 568 yd (519 m) |
| EF0 | Several residences sustained minor roof damage. An irrigation pivot was impacted. | | | | | | |
| EF2 | NE of East Bend to SW of Lawsonville | Stokes | NC | 36.2634°N 80.4434°W | 20:52–21:19 | 16.1 mi (25.9 km) | 700 yd (640 m) |
| EF2 | This strong tornado passed near Hanging Rock State Park. Numerous trees were snapped or uprooted, with large swaths of trees flattened. One small grove of trees was completely defoliated, denuded, shredded by flying debris, and sustained low-end debarking. Numerous outbuildings, mobile homes, and cabins at a YMCA camp were damaged. | | | | | | |
| EF0 | NNE of Harveysburg | Warren | OH | 39.5527°N 83.9794°W | 23:55 | 0.23 mi (0.37 km) | 25 yd (23 m) |
| EF0 | Radar data and video evidence confirmed a weak tornado over open fields. | | | | | | |
| EF1 | Ironton | Lawrence | OH | 38.5357°N 82.683°W | 00:11–00:15 | 3.04 mi (4.89 km) | 100 yd (91 m) |
| EF1 | Extensive tree damage was observed. A home sustained damage to its roof, chimney, garage, and porch. | | | | | | |
| EF0 | WNW of Xenia | Greene | OH | 39.6804°N 83.9749°W | 00:26–00:34 | 2.61 mi (4.20 km) | 40 yd (37 m) |
| EF0 | A small tree was uprooted and small tree limbs were damaged, and power lines and a power meter on a home also sustained damage. | | | | | | |
| EF0 | WSW of Octa | Fayette, Greene | OH | 39.5824°N 83.6584°W | 00:27–00:36 | 2.95 mi (4.75 km) | 25 yd (23 m) |
| EF0 | Radar data and video evidence confirmed a weak tornado over open fields. | | | | | | |
| EF0 | SW of Medway | Greene, Clark | OH | 39.833°N 84.0227°W | 01:07–01:16 | 2.57 mi (4.14 km) | 90 yd (82 m) |
| EF0 | Several manufactured homes sustained roof and siding damage, as well as had their carports and awnings destroyed. Several large trees were damaged, including two trees that fell and destroyed two homes. Other houses had mud splattered on their walls. | | | | | | |
| EF1 | Western Park Layne to NE of West Charleston | Clark, Miami | OH | 39.8865°N 84.0468°W | 01:16–01:32 | 4.51 mi (7.26 km) | 300 yd (270 m) |
| EF1 | This tornado caused considerable damage to a gas station, dollar store, restaurant, and several other businesses in Park Layne. Signs, fences, and light poles were destroyed. Trees were downed, and other structures sustained minor roof damage. A barn was damaged near the end of the path. | | | | | | |
| EF1 | SE of Piqua | Miami | OH | 40.0976°N 84.1708°W | 02:09–02:10 | 0.34 mi (0.55 km) | 25 yd (23 m) |
| EF1 | A large barn was moved several inches off its foundation. Numerous large trees were snapped. | | | | | | |
| EF1 | Southeastern Vidalia | Toombs | GA | 32.2002°N 82.3925°W | 03:09–03:16 | 4.2 mi (6.8 km) | 440 yd (400 m) |
| EF1 | Several businesses sustained minor structural damage, a large pole was bent, and numerous trees were snapped or uprooted. | | | | | | |

=== May 25 event ===
List of reported tornadoes – Thursday, May 25, 2017
| EF# | Location | County / Parish | State | Start Coord. | Time (UTC) | Path length | Max width |
|---|---|---|---|---|---|---|---|
| EF0 | S of Atwood | Logan | CO | 40.48°N 103.27°W | 19:05 | 0.01 mi (0.016 km) | 25 yd (23 m) |
| EF0 | A storm chaser reported a brief tornado in an open field. | | | | | | |
| EF0 | ESE of Idalia | Yuma | CO | 39.6876°N 102.1557°W | 21:35–21:42 | 2.78 mi (4.47 km) | 100 yd (91 m) |
| EF0 | A storm chaser observed a tornado. | | | | | | |

=== May 26 event ===
List of reported tornadoes – Friday, May 26, 2017
| EF# | Location | County / Parish | State | Start Coord. | Time (UTC) | Path length | Max width |
|---|---|---|---|---|---|---|---|
| EF0 | WSW of Wamsutter | Sweetwater | WY | 41.6437°N 108.4234°W | 18:40–18:53 | 11.36 mi (18.28 km) | 30 yd (27 m) |
| EF0 | Trained storm spotters reported a tornado. | | | | | | |
| EF0 | SSE of Woodrow | Washington | CO | 39.91°N 103.54°W | 22:20 | 0.01 mi (0.016 km) | 25 yd (23 m) |
| EF0 | A trained storm spotter saw rotation in the mesocyclone and at the ground. | | | | | | |
| EF1 | NW of Alvin | Vermilion | IL | 40.3299°N 87.6387°W | 22:53–22:54 | 0.29 mi (0.47 km) | 75 yd (69 m) |
| EF1 | Trees were snapped. A home sustained damage to its roof and siding, had its attic windows broken, and saw siding blown off its garage. | | | | | | |
| EF0 | S of Idalia | Yuma | CO | 39.58°N 102.29°W | 00:45 | 0.5 mi (0.80 km) | 75 yd (69 m) |
| EF0 | An NWS employee reported a tornado. | | | | | | |
| EF0 | N of Hoxie | Sheridan | KS | 39.41°N 100.51°W | 04:35 | 0.25 mi (0.40 km) | 50 yd (46 m) |
| EF0 | A farmer reported a brief tornado. | | | | | | |
| EF0 | N of Hoxie | Sheridan | KS | 39.43°N 100.44°W | 04:45 | 0.25 mi (0.40 km) | 30 yd (27 m) |
| EF0 | A storm chaser observed a wall cloud with a debris swirl visible on the ground. | | | | | | |

=== May 27 event ===
List of reported tornadoes – Saturday, May 27, 2017
| EF# | Location | County / Parish | State | Start Coord. | Time (UTC) | Path length | Max width |
|---|---|---|---|---|---|---|---|
| EF1 | NNE of Sunrise Beach | Morgan | MO | 38.1918°N 92.7854°W | 19:38–19:39 | 0.06 mi (0.097 km) | 300 yd (270 m) |
| EF1 | A metal building had its roof damaged, and numerous trees were uprooted. | | | | | | |
| EF1 | N of Sunrise Beach | Morgan | MO | 38.204°N 92.7704°W | 19:38–19:39 | 0.13 mi (0.21 km) | 50 yd (46 m) |
| EF1 | Several trees were uprooted. | | | | | | |
| EF1 | NE of Phillipsburg to NNE of Evergreen | Laclede | MO | 37.6004°N 92.7221°W | 19:50–19:57 | 9 mi (14 km) | 100 yd (91 m) |
| EF1 | Numerous trees were snapped or uprooted, and some outbuildings were damaged or destroyed. | | | | | | |
| EF1 | SE of Falcon | Laclede | MO | 37.5862°N 92.3541°W | 20:05–20:10 | 4.97 mi (8.00 km) | 400 yd (370 m) |
| EF1 | A home sustained moderate to major damage, and numerous trees were snapped and uprooted. | | | | | | |
| EF1 | SW of Drynob | Laclede | MO | 37.6284°N 92.4892°W | 20:09–20:11 | 2.07 mi (3.33 km) | 100 yd (91 m) |
| EF1 | Numerous trees were snapped or uprooted. | | | | | | |
| EF1 | SW of Fort Leonard Wood | Laclede | MO | 37.65°N 92.26°W | 20:25 | 0.01 mi (0.016 km) | 100 yd (91 m) |
| EF1 | Numerous trees were uprooted. | | | | | | |
| EF0 | S of Lake Spring | Dent | MO | 37.7655°N 91.6816°W | 21:00 | 0.01 mi (0.016 km) | 50 yd (46 m) |
| EF0 | Pictures from a storm chaser and trained storm spotter confirmed a tornado in a heavily wooded area. | | | | | | |
| EF0 | S of Harper | Keokuk | IA | 41.32°N 92.05°W | 22:22 | 8.74 mi (14.07 km) | 100 yd (91 m) |
| EF0 | A storm chaser observed a brief touchdown which caused no known damage. | | | | | | |
| EF0 | NW of Poplar Bluff | Butler | MO | 36.7912°N 90.5013°W | 01:18–01:22 | 1.85 mi (2.98 km) | 85 yd (78 m) |
| EF0 | Several trees were uprooted and numerous limbs were broken. At least two homes were damaged by fallen trees, and an additional six received shingle damage. | | | | | | |
| EF0 | N of Paden | Okfuskee | OK | 35.6012°N 96.5336°W | 01:20–01:26 | 2.1 mi (3.4 km) | 100 yd (91 m) |
| EF0 | Storm chasers and local residents observed a tornado. | | | | | | |
| EFU | S of Welty | Okfuskee | OK | 35.5657°N 96.4238°W | 01:55–02:02 | 0.6 mi (0.97 km) | 100 yd (91 m) |
| EFU | Storm chasers and local residents observed a tornado over inaccessible terrain. Footage from a drone proved inconclusive as well. | | | | | | |
| EFU | S of Dougherty | Carter, Murray | OK | 34.359°N 97.037°W | 03:17–03:21 | 2.83 mi (4.55 km) | 50 yd (46 m) |
| EFU | A KOCO-TV storm chaser reported a tornado. | | | | | | |
| EFU | WSW of Reagan | Johnston | OK | 34.332°N 96.844°W | 03:39–03:41 | 1.5 mi (2.4 km) | 50 yd (46 m) |
| EFU | Numerous trained storm spotters observed a tornado. | | | | | | |
| EFU | NW of Ringling | Jefferson | OK | 34.219°N 97.735°W | 04:06–04:13 | 2.52 mi (4.06 km) | 100 yd (91 m) |
| EFU | A KOCO-TV storm chaser reported a tornado. | | | | | | |
| EF1 | Short to ESE of Natural Dam | Sequoyah, Crawford | OK, AR | 35.5797°N 94.4911°W | 04:45–04:56 | 11.2 mi (18.0 km) | 700 yd (640 m) |
| EF1 | Trees were uprooted and large tree limbs were snapped. The roof of a mobile home was destroyed, and outbuildings were damaged. | | | | | | |

=== May 28 event ===
List of reported tornadoes – Sunday, May 28, 2017
| EF# | Location | County / Parish | State | Start Coord. | Time (UTC) | Path length | Max width |
|---|---|---|---|---|---|---|---|
| EF1 | Longview | Gregg | TX | 32.5501°N 94.8205°W | 21:53–22:03 | 10.27 mi (16.53 km) | 800 yd (730 m) |
| EF1 | A steel dome owned by Komatsu was collapsed, a few homes were damaged, and numerous trees were knocked down, uprooted, or twisted, several of which landed on homes. | | | | | | |
| EF1 | Easton | Gregg, Rusk | TX | 32.3834°N 94.6213°W | 22:07–22:12 | 4.64 mi (7.47 km) | 400 yd (370 m) |
| EF1 | Numerous trees were uprooted or knocked down, several of which fell on homes. | | | | | | |
| EF1 | SSE of Goldonna | Winn | LA | 31.9719°N 92.8796°W | 00:50–00:53 | 1.13 mi (1.82 km) | 564 yd (516 m) |
| EF1 | Numerous trees were snapped or uprooted in the Kisatchie National Forest. | | | | | | |
| EF1 | SE of Goldonna | Winn | LA | 31.9759°N 92.8568°W | 00:52–00:53 | 0.12 mi (0.19 km) | 127 yd (116 m) |
| EF1 | Numerous trees were snapped or uprooted in the Kisatchie National Forest. | | | | | | |
| EF1 | SSE of Calvin | Winn | LA | 31.9083°N 92.7384°W | 01:07–01:08 | 0.09 mi (0.14 km) | 135 yd (123 m) |
| EF1 | Numerous trees were snapped or uprooted in the Kisatchie National Forest. | | | | | | |

=== May 30 event ===
List of reported tornadoes – Tuesday, May 30, 2017
| EF# | Location | County / Parish | State | Start Coord. | Time (UTC) | Path length | Max width |
|---|---|---|---|---|---|---|---|
| EFU | E of Galliano | Lafourche | LA | 29.47°N 90.2335°W | 19:36 | 0.25 mi (0.40 km) | 50 yd (46 m) |
| EFU | Tornado observed over unpopulated marshes. | | | | | | |
| EFU | SSE of Golden Meadow | Lafourche | LA | 29.2705°N 90.1965°W | 21:39 | 0.25 mi (0.40 km) | 75 yd (69 m) |
| EFU | Tornado observed over unpopulated marshes. | | | | | | |
| EF0 | Berryville | Clarke | VA | 39.1682°N 77.9986°W | 21:59–22:01 | 0.45 mi (0.72 km) | 25 yd (23 m) |
| EF0 | Trees were uprooted or had their limbs snapped. The protective coverings of a wood pile was strewn south. | | | | | | |

=== May 31 event ===
List of reported tornadoes – Wednesday, May 31, 2017
| EF# | Location | County / Parish | State | Start Coord. | Time (UTC) | Path length | Max width |
|---|---|---|---|---|---|---|---|
| EF0 | ESE of Cassoday | Butler | KS | 38.01°N 96.55°W | 19:44–19:45 | 0.34 mi (0.55 km) | 50 yd (46 m) |
| EF0 | An emergency manager reported multiple brief tornado touchdowns in an open field. | | | | | | |
| EF1 | Wappinger | Dutchess | NY | 41.6425°N 73.8736°W | 22:58–23:00 | 1.11 mi (1.79 km) | 440 yd (400 m) |
| EF1 | A brief tornado snapped or uprooted numerous trees and lifted the roof off a shed. | | | | | | |

== See also ==
- Tornadoes of 2017
- List of United States tornadoes in April 2017
- List of United States tornadoes from June to July 2017
