= Core Creek (Osage Fork Gasconade River tributary) =

Location
- Country: United States
- State: Missouri
- County: Laclede County

Physical characteristics
- Source
  - location: Laclede County, Missouri, United States
  - coordinates: 37°37′12″N 92°23′54″W
- Mouth
  - location: Laclede County, Missouri, United States
  - coordinates: 37°38′55″N 92°27′4″W
  - elevation: 922 ft (281 m)

Core Creek (Missouri)

Core Creek is a small stream in Laclede County, Missouri. It is a tributary of the Osage Fork Gasconade River.

The stream headwaters arise on the north side of a ridge at an elevation of 1150 feet and just north of Missouri Route 32. The community of Falcon is about 1.5 miles to the southeast. The stream flows about three miles to the northwest to its confluence with the Osage Fork just north (downstream) of the community of Dryknob.
