= Saint Annie, Missouri =

Unincorporated community in Missouri, U.S.

- Unincorporated community
- Location within Missouri
- Coordinates: 37°38′01″N 92°13′10″W
- Country: United States
- State: Missouri
- County: Laclede
- Elevation: 1,125 ft (343 m)
- Time zone: UTC-6 (Central (CST))
  - Summer (DST): UTC-5 (CDT)
- Area code: 417
- GNIS feature ID: 740600

Saint Annie was an unincorporated community in southwest Pulaski County, Missouri, United States. The community was about a mile south of Cookville, but the post office moved depending on where the postmaster lived. The last active post office was located on Webster Drive just west of the Laclede-Texas county line approximately five miles north of Lynchburg. The community of Winnipeg is about 3 1/2 miles to the northwest.

== History ==
The oldest records place the unincorporated community of Saint Annie in southwest Pulaski County close to the Texas County line, Township 34 Range 12. This was in the southern portion of the Roubidoux township of Pulaski County. The community was only one mile south of Cookville.

A post office at Saint Annie was established in 1867 with George Hume as postmaster. It is suggested that it was named after a diminutive expression for Mexican General Antonio Lopez de Santa Anna by Missouri Mexican War veterans. The post office was later moved to Laclede County, southwest of present-day Ft. Leonard Wood, but retained the name.

By the 1890s the Saint Annie community had both a school and a church. The Saint Annie Baptist Church was organized in 1891 with T. H. Bollenger as the first pastor. This new church was organized in November, 1891, with eleven constituent members. Other early pastors included W. H. Howell - 1892–1893, J.N. Manes – 1894, G. L. Shockley – 1895, J. J. Watts – 1896, and A. R. Fetterhoff. The Pulaski County Association of Baptist Churches held its annual meeting with the St. Annie church in 1895. The annual minutes record: “Cookville, Mo., August 2, 1895. The Pulaski County Association of Baptist Churches met this day in its twenty-fifth annual session with the St. Annie church in the grove near St. Annie School House, Pulaski County, Mo.” During that 1895 meeting, A. J. Riddle and James Roberson were set apart as deacons of the St. Annie Church, the church having previously ordered said ordination. The association would again meet at Saint Annie in 1911.

The Saint Annie schoolhouse was about a mile distant from the church and was being used to educate children by at least 1893 with George Lane Sr. as the teacher. A neighboring post office called Bend, located along the Texas and Laclede county line, was discontinued in March 1886 and merged into the Saint Annie Post Office of which Christopher Myers was then postmaster. In 1895 the position of postmaster of Saint Annie moved from Christopher Myers to Ben Crismon who owned the farm adjoining the farms of former Bend post masters Hiram King and Samuel Bradford. For the final 36 years of the existence of the Saint Annie Post office it was located in Laclede County in the home of Ben Crismon about six miles east of Nebo. The Crismon farm was halfway between the post office at Plato and the post office at Cookville along the route on Roubidoux Creek. The Plato and Cookville offices were about six miles in either direction. The Saint Annie post office was discontinued on July 15, 1930, and sent to Cookville.

In 1930 the Gulf Oil Company was building a pumping station for a new pipeline near the Crismon farm on what is now U Highway in Laclede County. The community that developed at the pump station which included several homes, a store, an auto repair shop, and the school known as Blackbird School was known as Gulf City and should not be confused with Saint Annie. Both the Saint Annie church and school were on land in Pulaski County that was taken by the government to form Fort Leonard Wood. The Saint Annie cemetery was moved by the United States Army to the Bloodland Cemetery, also on Fort Leonard Wood. The Saint Annie Baptist Church "owned their own church building and functioned as a church until the Fort took it and the money that the Fort paid was used to buy the Pulaski County Baptist camp.” The bell from the church was placed on the lawn of the Pulaski County Courthouse in Waynesville. The brand new Saint Annie School building, which had just been completed, was demolished by the military. The remains of the foundation of that school building and the nearby cemetery of the Macedonia Christian Church are the only visible traces left of the St Annie community.
