= Joseph Core =

Joseph Core was born April 25, 1843, in Virginia. In about 1853, he moved with his family to Edwards County, Illinois. In 1859, he moved with his family to Laclede County, Missouri.

Joseph served in the American Civil War as a private in the Union Company 'G' 24th Missouri Infantry Volunteers. He mustered on November 30, 1861, in Oakland, Laclede County, Missouri. He served for four years and mustered out in St. Louis, Missouri, on October 10, 1864.

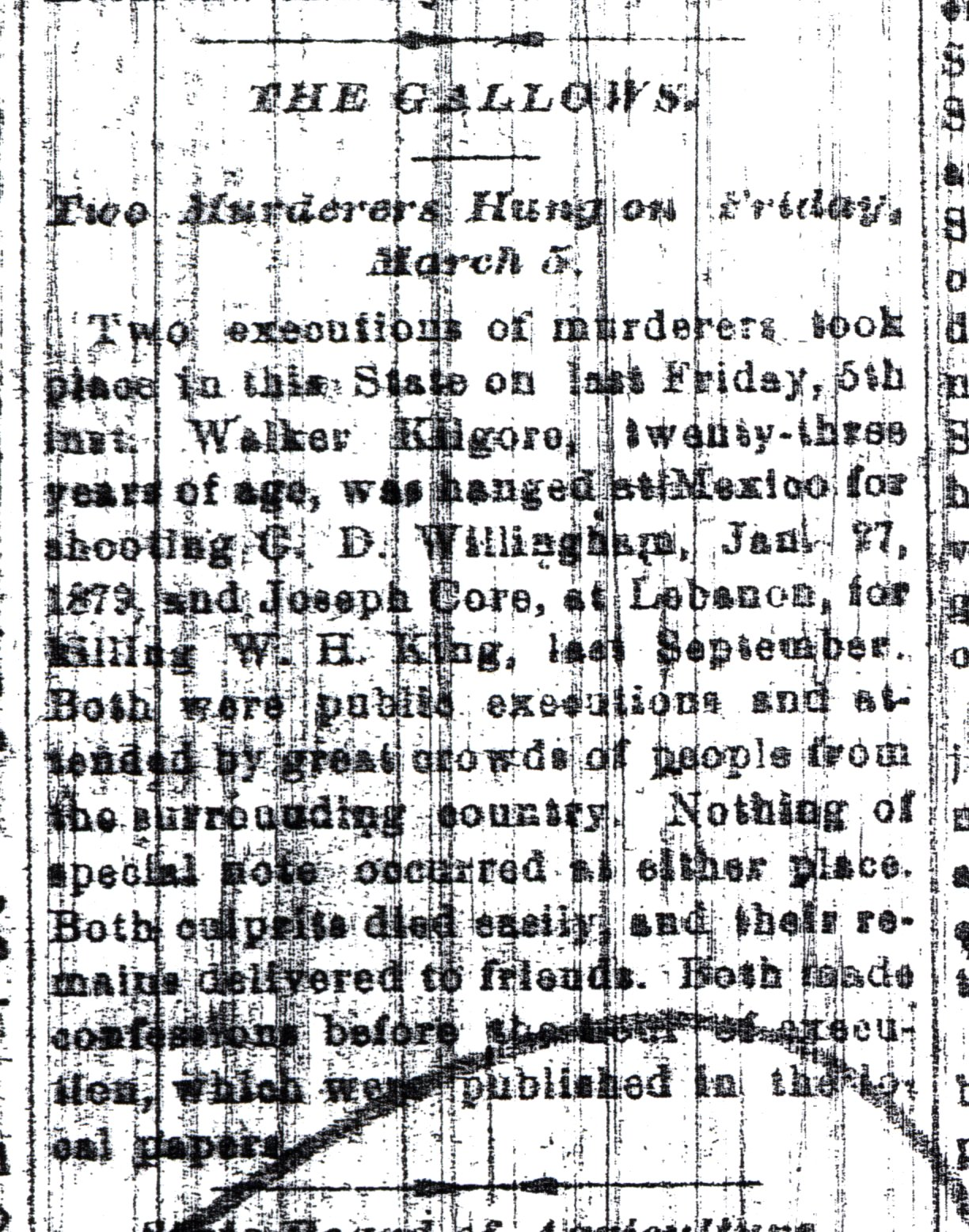
1880 March, Hangings in Missouri

On February 2, 1865, Joseph married Isabella Hemphill (1844–1879) in Laclede County, Missouri. Joseph was a crop farmer in Laclede County.

On January 21, 1879, Joseph murdered George E. King (c1826 – 1879) near Drynob, Laclede County, Missouri. He was tried and found guilty in Lebanon, Missouri. He was sentenced to death by hanging on August 21, 1879. A public execution was held on March 5, 1880. Joseph Core was the first legal hanging in Laclede County, Missouri.
