= Coon Hollow =

Coon Hollow may refer to:

- Coon Hollow (Laclede County, Missouri)
- Coon Hollow (Washington County, Missouri)
