= Coffeeville =

Coffeeville is the name of four settlements in the United States:

- Coffeeville, Alabama
- Coffeeville, Arkansas
- Coffeeville, Mississippi
- Coffeeville, Texas

The Coffeeville Dam and lock on the Tombigbee River in Alabama also take the name.

== See also ==
- Coffeyville, Kansas
- Caffeyville, Missouri
