= Bear Creek (Gasconade River tributary) =

Stream in Missouri, U.S.

Bear Creek is a stream in Laclede and Pulaski counties the U.S. state of Missouri. It is a tributary of the Gasconade River.

The stream headwaters are located at 37°39′56″N 92°35′49″W and the confluence with the Gasconade is at 37°47′56″N 92°24′03″W. The stream source is just south of Missouri Route 32 about three miles east of Lebanon. The stream flows north and then northeast running parallel to Interstate 44 passing south of Sleeper. The stream passes under the interstate and under Missouri Route T southeast of Stoutland. It continues east entering Pulaski County one half mile before entering the Gasconade under the Missouri Route 133 bridge south of Richland.

Bear Creek was named for the fact the area was a hunting ground of bears by pioneer settlers.

== See also ==
- List of rivers of Missouri
