= Cobb Creek (Missouri) =

Stream in the American state of Missouri

Location
- Country: United States
- State: Missouri
- Region: Wright and Laclede counties

Physical characteristics
- Source
  - coordinates: 37°27′41″N 92°30′16″W
- Mouth
  - coordinates: 37°34′26″N 92°28′23″W
  - elevation: 961 ft (293 m)

Cobb Creek is a stream in extreme northern Wright and south-central Laclede counties in the Ozarks of southern Missouri. It is a tributary of the Osage Fork Gasconade River. The stream origin is just southeast of Origanna and east of State Route TT. The stream flows NNE past Agnes, receives the waters of Blue Spring and flows just west of Drew. The stream joins the Osage Fork northwest of Drew. The elevation of the stream confluence is 961 ft (293 m).

Cobb Creek has the name of the local Cobb family.

== See also ==
- List of rivers of Missouri
