= Delmar, Missouri =

Unincorporated community in Missouri, U.S.

Coordinates: 37°46′57″N 92°33′01″W

Delmar is an unincorporated community in northeast Laclede County, in the U.S. state of Missouri.

The community is on a county road just east of Missouri Route JJ approximately 2.5 miles northeast of Sleeper and three miles southwest of Stoutland.

The community most likely was named after a thoroughfare of the same name in St. Louis.
