= Ira, Missouri =

Unincorporated community in Missouri, U.S.

Coordinates: 37°52′22″N 92°50′59″W

Ira is an unincorporated community in northeastern Laclede County, in the Ozarks of south central Missouri. The community is located on Missouri Route E, approximately six miles northwest of Eldridge and about one-quarter mile east of the Laclede-Dallas county line.

== History ==
A post office called Ira was established in 1899, and remained in operation until 1949. The community has the name of Ira Waterman, an early settler.
