= Brownfield (disambiguation) =

In urban planning, brownfield land is land previously used for industrial purposes or some commercial uses.

Brownfield or Brown Field may also refer to:

== Places ==
- Brownfield, Maine, United States
- Brownfield, Missouri, unincorporated community in northeastern Laclede County
- Brownfield, Texas, a city in Terry County, United States
  - Brownfield Independent School District, a public school district based in the town
- Brownfields, Louisiana, an unincorporated area in East Baton Rouge Parish, United States
- Brownfield, Alberta, a hamlet in Alberta, Canada
- Brown Field, a camp at Marine Corps Base Quantico

== People with the surname ==
- Dion Brownfield (c. 2010s), Indigenous Australian songwriter, director, artist manager, and activist; nominated at the 2021 APRA Music Awards and the 2020 Vanda & Young Global Songwriting Competition
- Kian Brownfield (born 2002), Indigenous Australian singer and songwriter known professionally as Kian
- Troy Brownfield (born 1973), American comic book writer, journalist, and college professor
- William R. Brownfield (born 1952), United States Foreign Service Career Ambassador and former Assistant Secretary of State

== Other uses ==
- Brownfield status, a legal condition regarding certain land
- Brownfield (software development), the deployment of new software systems in the immediate presence of existing software
- Brown Field Municipal Airport, San Diego County, California
- Brown Field, a sports field used by Tulane Green Wave, New Orleans, Louisiana
- Brown Field (Valparaiso University), stadium in Valparaiso, Indiana

== See also ==
- Brown (disambiguation)
- Field (disambiguation)
