= Case, Laclede County, Missouri =

Unincorporated community in Missouri, U.S.

Coordinates: 37°50′38″N 92°45′50″W

Case is an unincorporated community in northern Laclede County, in the U.S. state of Missouri. The community was on Missouri Route E approximately 1.5 miles northwest of Eldridge.

== History ==
A post office called Case was established in 1861, and remained in operation until 1876. The community was named after John Case, a pioneer citizen.
