= Grace, Laclede County, Missouri =

Unincorporated community in Missouri, U.S.

Coordinates: 37°51′27″N 92°44′41″W

Grace is an unincorporated community in northern Laclede County, in the Ozarks of south central Missouri. The community is located on Missouri Route D, two miles north of Eldridge and two miles west of Missouri Route 5.

== History ==
A post office called Grace was established in 1912, and remained in operation until 1928. An early postmaster gave the community the name of his daughter, Grace Devine.
