= Dove, Missouri =

Unincorporated community in Missouri, U.S.

Coordinates: 37°47′27″N 92°40′58″W

Dove is an unincorporated community in Laclede County, in the U.S. state of Missouri.

The community is located along Missouri Route 5 one-half mile north of the junction with Missouri Route F. Decaturville in southern Camden County is approximately 7.5 miles to the north, Sleeper is five miles to the southeast on route F and Lebanon is seven miles south. The area around the community is drained by tributaries of Dry Auglaize Creek which flows past about four miles to the east.

== History ==
A post office called Dove was established in 1899, and remained in operation until 1929. The community was named for the abundance of mourning doves near a local pond.
