= Danceyard Hollow =

Valley in Laclede County, Missouri, United States

Coordinates: 37.7397614°N 92.8532373°W

Danceyard Hollow is a valley in Laclede County in the U.S. state of Missouri.

Danceyard Hollow was named for a clearing where Indians were said to have held ritual dances.
