= Lyons, Missouri =

Unincorporated community in Missouri, U.S.

Coordinates: 37°33′57″N 92°29′41″W

Lyons is an unincorporated community in Laclede County, in the U.S. state of Missouri. The community was located on Missouri Route B southeast of the Osage Fork crossing. The community of Drew is approximately three miles to the southeast.

== History ==
A variant name was "Delto". A post office called Delto was established in 1874, the name was changed to Lyon in 1913, and the post office closed in 1928. The present name honors the Lyons family, local merchants.
