= Prosperine, Missouri =

Unincorporated community in Missouri, U.S.

Coordinates: 37°47′34″N 92°45′59″W

Prosperine is an unincorporated community in northwest Laclede County, in the Ozarks of south central Missouri. The community is located on Route AA, approximately 2.5 miles southwest of Eldridge.

== History ==
A post office called Prosperine was established in 1900, and remained in operation until 1952. The community's founder expected the settlement to prosper, hence the name.
