= Carrol Junction, Missouri =

Unincorporated community in Missouri, U.S.

Coordinates: 37°44′19″N 92°36′07″W

Carrol Junction (also known as Carroll) is an unincorporated community in Laclede County, in the Ozarks of south central Missouri. The community is located along the railroad line just west of Interstate 44 and 1.75 miles southwest of Sleeper.

The community was named after W. C. Carroll, a local farmer.
