= Winnipeg (disambiguation) =

Winnipeg is Manitoba's capital and Canada's sixth-largest city.

Winnipeg may also refer to:

== Places ==
=== Canada ===
- Winnipeg (federal electoral district) (1882–1917)
- Winnipeg Capital Region, Manitoba
- Lake Winnipeg
- Winnipeg River

=== United States ===
- Winnipeg, Missouri
- Winnipeg Junction, Minnesota

== Other uses ==
- Winnipeg (bear), a black bear at London Zoo
- HMCS Winnipeg (FFH 338), a Canadian frigate (launched 1994)
- Winnipeg (ship), a French steamer which carried Spanish refugees (1930–1942)
