= Brush Creek, Missouri =

Unincorporated community in Missouri, U.S.

Coordinates: 37°36′58″N 92°42′49″W

Brush Creek is an unincorporated community in southern Laclede County, in the U.S. state of Missouri. The community lies four miles southwest of Lebanon and approximately one mile north of Caffeyville. I-44 passes about one mile to the southeast.

== History ==
A post office called Brush Creek was established in 1863, and remained in operation until 1975. The community takes its name from nearby Brush Creek. Brush Creek was designated a natural area on November 16, 1984.
