= Washington Township, Laclede County, Missouri =

Inactive township in the American state of Missouri

Coordinates: 37.5608°N 92.6136°W

Washington Township is an inactive township in Laclede County, in the U.S. state of Missouri.

Washington Township was established in 1874, taking its name from President George Washington.
