= Franklin Township, Laclede County, Missouri =

Inactive township in the American state of Missouri

Coordinates: 37.5269°N 92.5006°W

Franklin Township is an inactive township in Laclede County, in the U.S. state of Missouri.

Franklin Township was established in 1874, taking its name from Franklin County, Missouri.
