= Eldridge Township, Laclede County, Missouri =

Inactive township in the American state of Missouri

Coordinates: 37.8358°N 92.7700°W

Eldridge Township is an inactive township in Laclede County, in the U.S. state of Missouri.

Eldridge Township was established in 1874, and named after S. N. Eldridge, a pioneer citizen.
