= Russ, Missouri =

Unincorporated community in Missouri, US

Coordinates: 37°35′02″N 92°35′10″W

Russ is an unincorporated community in Laclede County, in the Ozarks of south central Missouri. The community is located on Route HH, approximately six miles southeast of Lebanon.

== History ==
A post office called Russ was established in 1890, and remained in operation until 1929. Russ Graves, an early postmaster, gave the community his first name.
