= Winnipeg, Missouri =

Unincorporated community in Missouri, U.S.

Winnipeg
- Unincorporated community
- Location in Missouri
- Coordinates: 37°36′16″N 92°18′08″W
- Country: United States
- State: Missouri
- County: Laclede

Winnipeg is an unincorporated community in eastern Laclede County, in the Ozarks of south central Missouri. The community is located above Nelson Creek, approximately three miles northeast of Missouri Route 32. Falcon and Nebo are to the west and southwest respectively. Missouri Route 17 and the southwestern corner of Fort Leonard Wood are about two miles to the east.

== History ==
A post office called Winnipeg was established in 1906, and remained in operation until 1954. The community was named after the Canadian city of Winnipeg, the native home of a share of the first settlers.
