= Agnes, Missouri =

Agnes
- Unincorporated community
- Location in Missouri Location in the United States
- Coordinates: 37°30′44″N 92°29′55″W
- Country: United States
- State: Missouri
- County: Laclede
- Elevation: 1,158 ft (353 m)
- GNIS feature ID: 748564

Agnes is an unincorporated community in southern Laclede County, Missouri, United States. Agnes is located on State Route O on the west side of Cobb Creek and approximately three miles north of the Laclede-Wright County line.

== History ==
A post office called Agnes was established in 1896, and remained in operation until 1933. The community was named after Agnes Handley, the wife of an early citizen.

In 1925, Agnes had 8 inhabitants.
