= Origanna, Missouri =

Unincorporated community in Missouri, U.S.

Coordinates: 37°28′42″N 92°30′42″W

Origanna is an unincorporated community in Laclede County, Missouri, United States. The town site lies just north of the Laclede-Wright county line on State Route TT. Competition is approximately six miles to the east.

== History ==
A post office called Origanna was established in 1901, and remained in operation until 1920. It is unknown why the name "Origanna" was applied to this community.
