= Phillipsburg Township, Laclede County, Missouri =

Township in Missouri

Coordinates: 37.5736°N 92.7733°W

Phillipsburg Township is an inactive township in Laclede County, in the U.S. state of Missouri.

Phillipsburg Township was originally called Union Township, and under the latter name was established in 1849. The present name was adopted in 1935.
