= Coon Hollow (Laclede County, Missouri) =

Valley in Missouri, U.S.

Coordinates: 37.6555980°N 92.4954486°W

Coon Hollow is a valley in Laclede County, Missouri, United States.

Coon Hollow was named after Caleb Coon, a pioneer citizen.
