= Bidwell, Missouri =

Unincorporated community in Missouri, U.S.

Bidwell Partlow
- Location in Missouri##Location in the United States
- Coordinates: 37°52′18″N 92°42′35″W
- Country: United States
- State: Missouri
- County: Laclede
- Elevation: 1,001 ft (305 m)
- GNIS feature ID: 740677

Bidwell is an unincorporated community in northern Laclede County, in the Ozarks of southern Missouri. The community is located just west of Missouri Route 5 and 2.5 miles south of Decaturville in southern Camden County.

== History ==
An early variant name was Partlow, after J. W. Partlow, a railroad promoter. A post office called Partlow was established in 1886, the name was changed to Bidwell in 1895, and the post office closed in 1915. The present name of Bidwell was the wife's maiden name of an early postmaster.
