= Orla, Missouri =

Unincorporated community in Missouri, U.S.

Coordinates: 37°31′35″N 92°34′58″W

Orla is an unincorporated community in southern Laclede County, in the Ozarks of southern Missouri. The community is located near the junction of Missouri Route 5 and Route O, east of the Osage Fork Gasconade River and approximately eleven miles south of Lebanon.

== History ==
A post office called Orla was established in 1880, and remained in operation until 1954. The name Orla is said to be named after the son of an early settler.
