= Lebanon Township, Laclede County, Missouri =

Township in Laclede County, Missouri, U.S.

Coordinates: 37.6778°N 92.6369°W

Lebanon Township is an inactive township in Laclede County, in the U.S. state of Missouri.

Lebanon Township was erected in 1849, taking its name from the community of Lebanon, Missouri.
