= Gasconade Township, Laclede County, Missouri =

Inactive township in the American state of Missouri

Coordinates: 37.5897°N 92.3350°W

Gasconade Township is an inactive township in Laclede County, in the U.S. state of Missouri.

Gasconade Township was established in 1874, taking its name from the Gasconade River.
