= Abo, Missouri =

Abo
- Unincorporated community
- Location in Missouri Location in the United States
- Coordinates: 37°41′52″N 92°27′55″W
- Country: United States
- State: Missouri
- County: Laclede
- Elevation: 909 ft (277 m)
- GNIS feature ID: 748555

Abo (/ˈeɪboʊ/ AY-boh) is an unincorporated community in eastern Laclede County, in the Ozarks of south central Missouri. The community is located on the east bank of the Osage Fork Gasconade River, approximately ten miles east of Lebanon.

== History ==
A post office called Abo was established in 1893, and remained in operation until 1940. The name may be a transfer from Abo, in New Mexico.

In 1925, Abo had 25 inhabitants.
