= Hazelgreen, Missouri =

Unincorporated community in Missouri, U.S.

Coordinates: 37°46′03″N 92°25′39″W

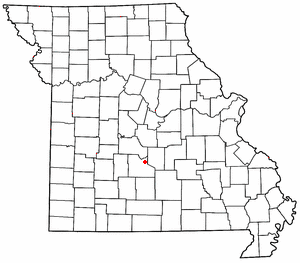

Hazelgreen is an Unincorporated community in eastern Laclede County, Missouri, United States. It lies along historic U.S. Route 66, now an outer road of Interstate 44. The town is split by I-44, one mile west of the I-44 - Missouri Route 133 junction in adjacent Pulaski County. The Gasconade River is just north and west of the site.

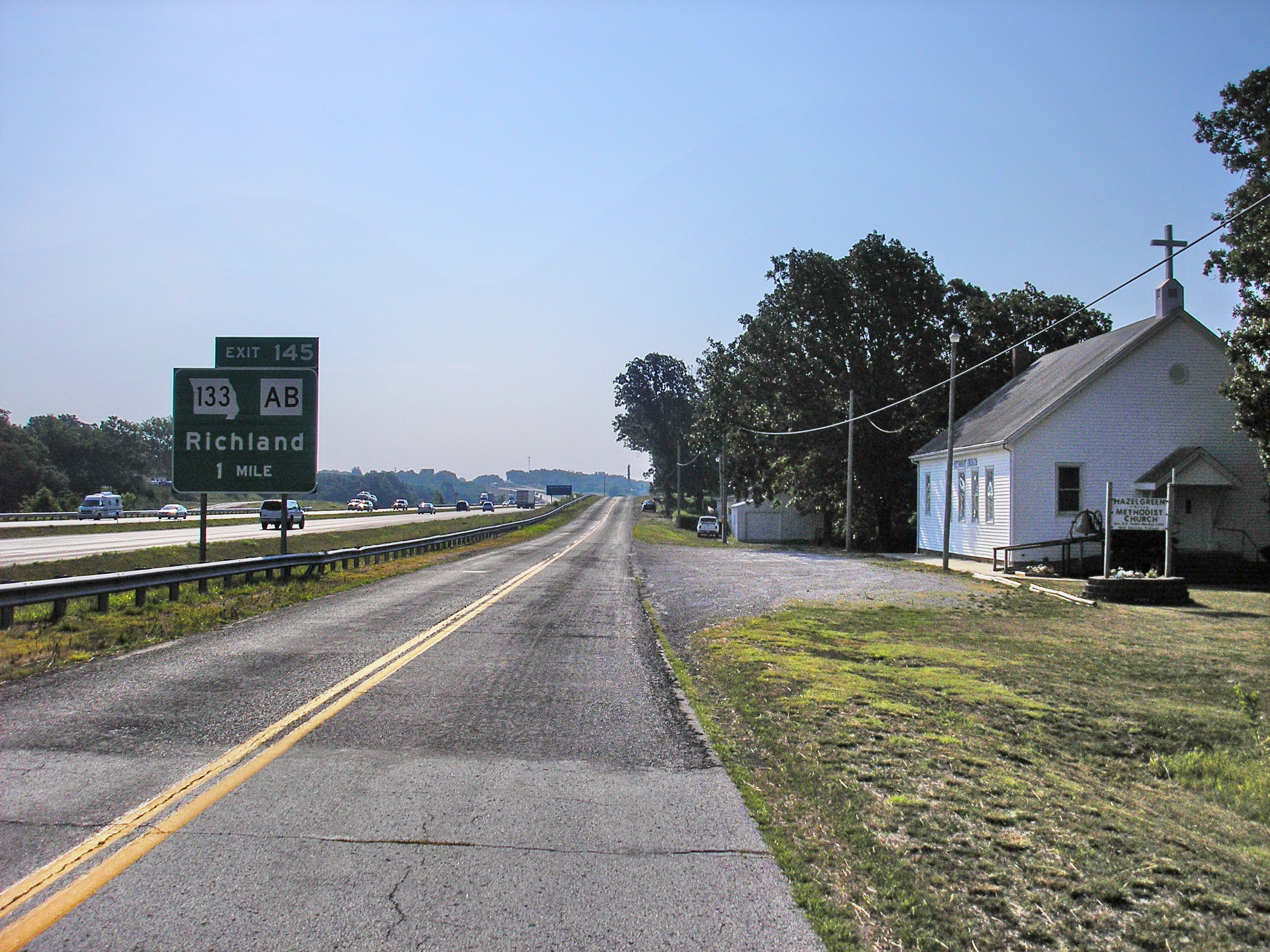
Along former US 66 in Hazelgreen.

A post office was established at Hazelgreen in 1858, and remained in operation until 1958. The community was named for the hazel bushes near the original town site.
