= Competition, Missouri =

Unincorporated community in Missouri, U.S.

Coordinates: 37°29′01″N 92°25′45″W

Competition is an Unincorporated community in southern Laclede County, Missouri, United States. It is located approximately seventeen miles southeast of Lebanon. It is on Missouri Route Z about one-half mile north of the Laclede-Wright county line. Lynchburg is approximately seven miles to the east. The Gasconade River flows past one mile to the east.

Competition was originally called "Newburg", and under the latter name, settlement was made in the 1840s. A post office under the town name of Competition was established in 1858, and remained in operation until 1967. A naming competition accounts for the present name.
