= Brownfield, Missouri =

Unincorporated community in Missouri, U.S.

Brownfield
- Unincorporated community
- Location within Missouri
- Coordinates: 37°40′01″N 92°20′42″W
- Country: United States
- State: Missouri
- County: Laclede

Brownfield is an unincorporated community in northeastern Laclede County, in the U.S. state of Missouri. The community is located just over one mile southeast of the Laclede-Pulaski county line and one mile east of Missouri Route K. It is within the Mark Twain National Forest and the Gasconade River lies just one mile to the east.

== History ==
A post office called Brownfield was established in 1930, and remained in operation until 1955. Riley Brownfield, an early postmaster, gave the community his last name.
