= Coon Hollow (Washington County, Missouri) =

Valley in Missouri, U.S.

Coordinates: 38.0969953°N 90.7648534°W

Coon Hollow is a valley in Washington County in the U.S. state of Missouri.

Coon Hollow was so named on account of raccoons in the area.
