= Wirt, Indiana =

Unincorporated community in Indiana, U.S.

Coordinates: 38°48′34″N 85°27′13″W

Wirt is an unincorporated community in Jefferson County, Indiana, in the United States.

A post office was established at Wirt in 1834. The community was named for William Wirt, a pioneer.
