= Stoutland, Missouri =

- City
- Stoutland in October 2026

- Location of Stoutland, Missouri
- Coordinates: 37°48′49″N 92°30′51″W
- Country: United States
- State: Missouri
- Counties: Camden, Laclede

Area
  - Total: 0.61 sq mi (1.57 km^{2})
  - Land: 0.61 sq mi (1.57 km^{2})
  - Water: 0 sq mi (0.00 km^{2})
- Elevation: 1,171 ft (357 m)

Population (2020)
  - Total: 209
  - Density: 345.8/sq mi (133.53/km^{2})
- Time zone: UTC-6 (Central (CST))
  - Summer (DST): UTC-5 (CDT)
- ZIP code: 65567
- Area code: 417
- FIPS code: 29-71008
- GNIS feature ID: 2395979

Stoutland is a city in Camden and Laclede counties in the U.S. state of Missouri. As of the 2020 census, Stoutland had a population of 209.

== History ==
The first settlement at Stoutland was made in 1869. A post office called Stoutland has been in operation since 1870. The village was named after Captain Stout, a railroad official.

== Geography ==
Stoutland is located on the Camden-Laclede county line at the intersection of Missouri routes T and F. Richland is approximately 6.5 miles to the northeast in Pulaski County and Sleeper in about 5.5 miles to the southwest in Laclede County. Bear Creek flows past about two miles to the southeast and the Gasconade River is one mile further south.

According to the United States Census Bureau, the city has a total area of 0.60 square miles (1.55 km^{2}), all land.

== Demographics ==
Historical population
| Census | Pop. | Note | %± |
|---|---|---|---|
| 1920 | 300 | | — |
| 1930 | 214 | | −28.7% |
| 1940 | 244 | | 14.0% |
| 1950 | 192 | | −21.3% |
| 1960 | 172 | | −10.4% |
| 1970 | 205 | | 19.2% |
| 1980 | 286 | | 39.5% |
| 1990 | 207 | | −27.6% |
| 2000 | 177 | | −14.5% |
| 2010 | 192 | | 8.5% |
| 2020 | 209 | | 8.9% |
U.S. Decennial Census

=== 2010 census ===
As of the census of 2010, there were 192 people, 93 households, and 50 families living in the city. The population density was 320.0 inhabitants per square mile (123.6/km^{2}). There were 104 housing units at an average density of 173.3 per square mile (66.9/km^{2}). The racial makeup of the city was 99.0% White and 1.0% from other races. Hispanic or Latino of any race were 5.7% of the population.

There were 93 households, of which 21.5% had children under the age of 18 living with them, 37.6% were married couples living together, 11.8% had a female householder with no husband present, 4.3% had a male householder with no wife present, and 46.2% were non-families. 38.7% of all households were made up of individuals, and 23.7% had someone living alone who was 65 years of age or older. The average household size was 2.06 and the average family size was 2.74.

The median age in the city was 46.4 years. 16.1% of residents were under the age of 18; 6.8% were between the ages of 18 and 24; 24% were from 25 to 44; 30.1% were from 45 to 64; and 22.9% were 65 years of age or older. The gender makeup of the city was 48.4% male and 51.6% female.

=== 2000 census ===
As of the census of 2000, there were 177 people, 81 households, and 52 families living in the village. The population density was 296.7 inhabitants per square mile (114.6/km^{2}). There were 97 housing units at an average density of 162.6 per square mile (62.8/km^{2}). The racial makeup of the village was 95.48% White, and 4.52% from two or more races.

There were 81 households, out of which 24.7% had children under the age of 18 living with them, 49.4% were married couples living together, 11.1% had a female householder with no husband present, and 35.8% were non-families. 34.6% of all households were made up of individuals, and 8.6% had someone living alone who was 65 years of age or older. The average household size was 2.19 and the average family size was 2.81.

In the village, the population was spread out, with 20.9% under the age of 18, 5.6% from 18 to 24, 29.4% from 25 to 44, 23.7% from 45 to 64, and 20.3% who were 65 years of age or older. The median age was 40 years. For every 100 females, there were 80.6 males. For every 100 females age 18 and over, there were 84.2 males.

The median income for a household in the village was $31,250, and the median income for a family was $41,875. Males had a median income of $30,500 versus $28,214 for females. The per capita income for the village was $15,476. About 5.1% of families and 5.5% of the population were below the poverty line, including 6.3% of those under the age of eighteen and 16.7% of those 65 or over.

== Education ==
Stoutland R-II School District operates one elementary school and Stoutland High School.

Stoutland has a public library, a branch of the Camden County Library District.
