= Nebo, Missouri =

Unincorporated community in Missouri, U.S.

Coordinates: 37°34′16″N 92°20′07″W

Nebo is an unincorporated community in eastern Laclede County, in the Ozarks of southern Missouri. The community lies on Missouri Route 32, approximately five miles northwest of Lynchburg and about fifteen miles southeast of Lebanon. The site is within the Mark Twain National Forest.

== History ==
A post office called Nebo was established in 1868, and remained in operation until 1960. The community most likely derives its name from Mount Nebo, a place mentioned in the Hebrew Bible.
