= Oakland, Laclede County, Missouri =

Unincorporated community in Missouri, U.S.

Coordinates: 37°38′11″N 92°33′34″W

Oakland is an unincorporated community in Laclede County, in the Ozarks of southern Missouri. The community is located on Route B, two miles south of the junction of Route B with Missouri Route 32. The site lies five miles southeast of Lebanon.

== History ==
A post office called Oakland was established in 1849, and remained in operation until 1955. The community was named for a grove of oak trees near the original town site.
