= Coffeeville, Arkansas =

Unincorporated community in Arkansas, US

Coordinates: 35°29′28″N 91°24′01″W

Coffeeville is an unincorporated community in Jackson County, Arkansas, United States.
