= Drew, Missouri =

Unincorporated community in Missouri, U.S.

Coordinates: 37°32′53″N 92°28′06″W

Drew is an unincorporated community in southern Laclede County, Missouri, United States. Drew is located on State Route B on a ridge east of Cobb Creek. The townsite is at an elevation of 1,109 ft (338 m).

== History ==
A post office at Drew was established in 1892, and remained in operation until 1930. The community has the name of S. E. Drew, a pioneer citizen.
