= Evergreen, Missouri =

- Village
- Village of Evergreen
- Location within the state of Missouri
- Coordinates: 37°33′05″N 92°36′05″W
- Country: United States
- State: Missouri
- County: Laclede

Area
  - Total: 10.20 sq mi (26.43 km^{2})
  - Land: 10.11 sq mi (26.18 km^{2})
  - Water: 0.097 sq mi (0.25 km^{2})
- Elevation: 1,204 ft (367 m)

Population (2020)
  - Total: 20
  - Density: 2.0/sq mi (0.76/km^{2})
- Time zone: UTC-6 (Central (CST))
  - Summer (DST): UTC-5 (CST)
- FIPS code: 29-22951
- GNIS feature ID: 2398845

Evergreen is a village in Laclede County, Missouri, United States. As of the 2020 census, Evergreen had a population of 20. It was named Twin Bridges at the 2000 census.

== Geography ==
According to the United States Census Bureau, the village has a total area of 10.21 square miles (26.44 km^{2}), of which 10.11 square miles (26.18 km^{2}) is land and 0.10 square miles (0.26 km^{2}) is water.

== Demographics ==
Historical population
Census	Pop.	Note	%±
1990	44		—
2000	42		−4.5%
2010	28		−33.3%
2020	20		−28.6%
U.S. Decennial Census

=== 2010 census ===
As of the census of 2010, there were 28 people, 10 households, and 8 families living in the village. The population density was 2.8 inhabitants per square mile (1.1/km^{2}). There were 13 housing units at an average density of 1.3 per square mile (0.5/km^{2}). The racial makeup of the village was 92.9% White, 3.6% African American, and 3.6% from two or more races.

There were 10 households, of which 40.0% had children under the age of 18 living with them, 70.0% were married couples living together, 10.0% had a female householder with no husband present, and 20.0% were non-families. 0.0% of all households were made up of individuals. The average household size was 2.80 and the average family size was 2.75.

The median age in the village was 38.5 years. 21.4% of residents were under the age of 18; 3.6% were between the ages of 18 and 24; 28.6% were from 25 to 44; 42.8% were from 45 to 64; and 3.6% were 65 years of age or older. The gender makeup of the village was 64.3% male and 35.7% female.

=== 2000 census ===
As of the census of 2000, there were 42 people, 13 households, and 10 families living in the village. The population density was 4.9 people per square mile (1.9/km^{2}). There were 16 housing units at an average density of 1.9 per square mile (0.7/km^{2}). The racial makeup of the village was 95.24% White and 4.76% Native American. Hispanic or Latino of any race were 4.76% of the population.

There were 13 households, out of which 69.2% had children under the age of 18 living with them, 69.2% were married couples living together, 7.7% had a female householder with no husband present, and 15.4% were non-families. 7.7% of all households were made up of individuals, and 7.7% had someone living alone who was 65 years of age or older. The average household size was 3.23 and the average family size was 3.45.

In the village, the population was spread out, with 38.1% under the age of 18, 9.5% from 18 to 24, 40.5% from 25 to 44, 9.5% from 45 to 64, and 2.4% who were 65 years of age or older. The median age was 26 years. For every 100 females, there were 121.1 males. For every 100 females age 18 and over, there were 100.0 males.

The median income for a household in the village was $31,875, and the median income for a family was $30,625. Males had a median income of $29,583 versus $13,750 for females. The per capita income for the village was $11,925. None of the population and none of the families were below the poverty line.
