= Caffeyville, Missouri =

Unincorporated community in Missouri, U.S.

Coordinates: 37°36′07″N 92°42′45″W

Caffeyville is an Unincorporated community in Laclede County, Missouri, United States, along the former U.S. Route 66. It is located approximately five miles (8 km) southwest of Lebanon on Route W, adjacent to Interstate 44.

The community has the name of Jessie Floyd Caffey, the proprietor of a gas station.
