= Drynob, Missouri =

Unincorporated community in Missouri, U.S.

Coordinates: 37°38′30″N 92°27′02″W

Drynob or Dryknob is an unincorporated community in Laclede County, in the U.S. state of Missouri.

The community is located above the west bank of the Osage Fork Gasconade River just north of the Missouri Route 32 bridge.

== History ==
A post office called Drynob was established in 1881, and remained in operation until 1956. The community was so named on account of its lofty elevation.
