= Falcon, Missouri =

Unincorporated community in Missouri, U.S.

Coordinates: 37°36′18″N 92°22′44″W

Falcon is an Unincorporated community in eastern Laclede County, Missouri, United States. It is approximately sixteen miles east of Lebanon on Route 32. The Gasconade River lies just east of the community, which is within the Mark Twain National Forest.

== History ==
The post office at Falcon has been in operation since 1907. It is unknown why the name "Falcon" was applied to this community. The ZIP Code for Falcon is 65470.
