= Lynchburg, Missouri =

Unincorporated community in Missouri, U.S.

Coordinates: 37.4964°N 92.2930°W

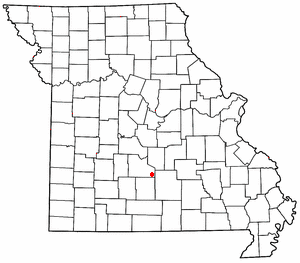

Lynchburg is an Unincorporated community in southeastern Laclede County, Missouri, United States. It is located at the intersection of Missouri routes 32 and 95, approximately 30 miles southeast of Lebanon.

A post office called Lynchburg was established in 1897, and remained in operation until 1996. The community has the name of David and R. D. Lynch, early settlers.
