= Sleeper, Missouri =

Unincorporated community in Missouri, U.S.

Coordinates: 37°45′38″N 92°35′35″W

Church in Sleeper

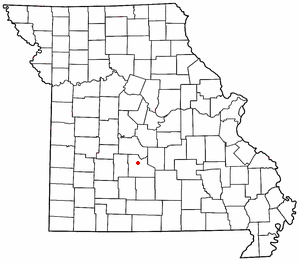

Sleeper is an Unincorporated community in Laclede County, Missouri, United States. It is located approximately one mile north of Interstate 44 at the intersection of Missouri routes F and J. It is and about six miles northeast of Lebanon and five miles southwest of Stoutland. Several homes and a fire station are located here.

A post office called Sleeper was established in 1883, and remained in operation until 1955. The community was named after "Sleeper", a railroad employee who often was noticeably tired.
