= Eldridge, Missouri =

Unincorporated community in Missouri, U.S.

Coordinates: 37°49′47″N 92°44′57″W

Eldridge is an Unincorporated community in northern Laclede County, Missouri, United States. It is situated approximately twelve miles northwest of Lebanon on Missouri Route E, west of Missouri Route 5. The ZIP Code for Eldridge is 65463.

Eldridge was platted in 1884, and named after S. N. Eldridge, a pioneer citizen. A post office called Eldridge has been in operation since 1886.
