= Laclede County, Missouri =

County in Missouri, United States

- County
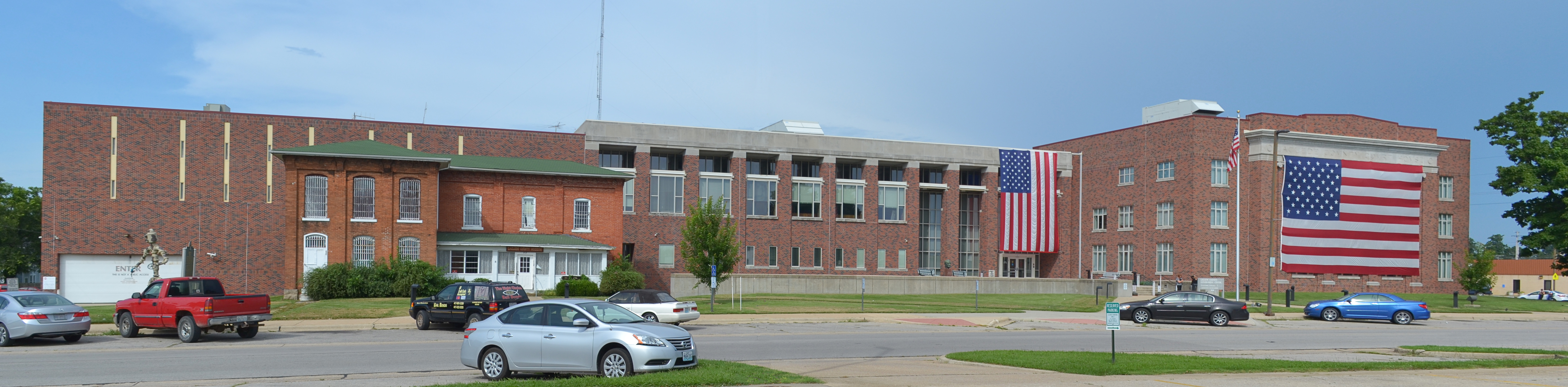
- Laclede County Courthouse in Lebanon

- Location within the U.S. state of Missouri
- Coordinates: 37°40′N 92°35′W
- Country: United States
- State: Missouri
- Founded: February 24, 1849
- Named for: Pierre Laclede
- Seat: Lebanon
- Largest city: Lebanon

Area
  - Total: 768 sq mi (1,990 km^{2})
  - Land: 765 sq mi (1,980 km^{2})
  - Water: 3.3 sq mi (8.5 km^{2}) 0.4%

Population (2020)
  - Total: 36,039
  - Estimate (2025): 36,943 ▲
  - Density: 47.1/sq mi (18.2/km^{2})
- Time zone: UTC−6 (Central)
  - Summer (DST): UTC−5 (CDT)
- Congressional district: 4th
- Website: lacledecountymissouri.org

Laclede County is a county located in the U.S. state of Missouri. As of the 2020 census, the population was 36,039. Its county seat is Lebanon. The county was organized February 24, 1849, and was named after Pierre Laclède, founder of St. Louis.

Laclede County comprises the Lebanon, MO Micropolitan Statistical Area.

== Geography ==
According to the U.S. Census Bureau, the county has a total area of 768 square miles (1,990 km^{2}), of which 765 square miles (1,980 km^{2}) is land and 3.3 square miles (8.5 km^{2}) (0.4%) is water.

=== Adjacent counties ===
- Camden County (north)
- Pulaski County (northeast)
- Texas County (southeast)
- Wright County (south)
- Webster County (southwest)
- Dallas County (west)

=== Major highways ===
- Interstate 44
- Route 5
- Route 7
- Route 17
- Route 32
- Route 64
- Route 64A

=== National protected area ===
- Mark Twain National Forest (part)

== Demographics ==
Historical population
Census	Pop.	Note	%±
1850	2,498		—
1860	5,182		107.4%
1870	9,380		81.0%
1880	11,524		22.9%
1890	14,721		27.7%
1900	16,523		12.2%
1910	17,363		5.1%
1920	16,857		−2.9%
1930	16,320		−3.2%
1940	18,718		14.7%
1950	19,010		1.6%
1960	18,991		−0.1%
1970	19,944		5.0%
1980	24,323		22.0%
1990	27,158		11.7%
2000	32,513		19.7%
2010	35,571		9.4%
2020	36,039		1.3%
2025 (est.)	36,943	▲	2.5%
U.S. Decennial Census; 1790-1960 1900-1990; 1990-2000 2010

=== Racial and ethnic composition ===
Laclede County, Missouri – Racial and ethnic composition Note: the US Census treats Hispanic/Latino as an ethnic category. This table excludes Latinos from the racial categories and assigns them to a separate category. Hispanics/Latinos may be of any race.
Race / Ethnicity (NH = Non-Hispanic)	Pop 1980	Pop 1990	Pop 2000	Pop 2010	Pop 2020	% 1980	% 1990	% 2000	% 2010	% 2020
White alone (NH)	23,948	26,702	31,296	33,596	32,482	98.46%	98.32%	96.26%	94.45%	90.13%
Black or African American alone (NH)	100	95	138	237	262	0.41%	0.35%	0.42%	0.67%	0.73%
Native American or Alaska Native alone (NH)	84	143	148	229	197	0.35%	0.53%	0.46%	0.64%	0.55%
Asian alone (NH)	34	76	94	148	190	0.14%	0.28%	0.29%	0.42%	0.53%
Native Hawaiian or Pacific Islander alone (NH)	x	x	15	16	17	x	x	0.05%	0.04%	0.05%
Other race alone (NH)	5	1	14	17	71	0.02%	0.00%	0.04%	0.05%	0.20%
Mixed race or Multiracial (NH)	x	x	407	609	1,865	x	x	1.25%	1.71%	5.17%
Hispanic or Latino (any race)	152	141	401	719	955	0.62%	0.52%	1.23%	2.02%	2.65%
Total	24,323	27,158	32,513	35,571	36,039	100.00%	100.00%	100.00%	100.00%	100.00%

=== 2020 census ===
As of the 2020 census, the county had a population of 36,039, a median age of 40.8 years, 24.0% of residents under the age of 18, 18.7% of residents 65 years of age or older, 98.5 males for every 100 females, and 95.8 males for every 100 females age 18 and over.

40.8% of residents lived in urban areas, while 59.2% lived in rural areas.

There were 14,325 households in the county, of which 30.3% had children under the age of 18 living with them and 24.6% had a female householder with no spouse or partner present; about 26.9% of all households were made up of individuals and 12.1% had someone living alone who was 65 years of age or older.

There were 15,908 housing units, of which 10.0% were vacant; among occupied housing units, 68.6% were owner-occupied and 31.4% were renter-occupied; the homeowner vacancy rate was 2.0% and the rental vacancy rate was 6.8%.

The racial and ethnic composition remained majority White (non-Hispanic), with smaller shares of Black or African American, Native American, Asian, Pacific Islander, other, and multiracial residents. 2.6% of residents identified as Hispanic or Latino of any race.

Laclede County Racial Composition
Race	Num.	Perc.
White (NH)	32,482	90.13%
Black or African American (NH)	262	0.72%
Native American (NH)	197	0.55%
Asian (NH)	190	0.53%
Pacific Islander (NH)	17	0.05%
Other/Mixed (NH)	1,936	5.4%
Hispanic or Latino	955	2.65%

=== 2000 census ===
As of the census of 2000, there were 32,513 people, 12,760 households, and 9,187 families residing in the county. The population density was 42 people per square mile (16 people/km^{2}). There were 14,320 housing units at an average density of 19 units per square mile (7.3/km^{2}). The racial makeup of the county was 97.04% White, 0.42% Black or African American, 0.49% Native American, 0.29% Asian, 0.05% Pacific Islander, 0.34% from other races, and 1.37% from two or more races. Approximately 1.23% of the population were Hispanic or Latino of any race.

There were 12,760 households, out of which 33.90% had children under the age of 18 living with them, 58.90% were married couples living together, 9.40% had a female householder with no husband present, and 28.00% were non-families. 24.00% of all households were made up of individuals, and 11.00% had someone living alone who was 65 years of age or older. The average household size was 2.52 and the average family size was 2.97.

In the county, the population was spread out, with 26.70% under the age of 18, 8.40% from 18 to 24, 27.80% from 25 to 44, 22.90% from 45 to 64, and 14.10% who were 65 years of age or older. The median age was 37 years. For every 100 females there were 96.40 males. For every 100 females age 18 and over, there were 92.90 males.

The median income for a household in the county was $29,562, and the median income for a family was $35,962. Males had a median income of $27,011 versus $18,283 for females. The per capita income for the county was $15,572. About 11.50% of families and 14.30% of the population were below the poverty line, including 16.50% of those under age 18 and 15.90% of those age 65 or over.

== Education ==
=== Public schools ===
- Laclede County R-I School District – Conway
  - Ezard Elementary School (PK-06)
  - Conway Junior High School (07-08)
  - Conway High School (09-12)
- Gasconade C-4 School District – Falcon
  - Gasconade Elementary School (PK-08)
- Lebanon R-III School District – Lebanon
  - Joe D. Esther Elementary School (PK-01)
  - Maplecrest Elementary School (02-03)
  - Boswell Elementary School (04-05)
  - Lebanon Middle School (06-08)
  - Lebanon High School (09-12)
- Joel E. Barber C-5 School District - Lebanon
  - Joel E. Barber Elementary School (PK-08)
- Stoutland R-II School District – Stoutland
  - Stoutland Elementary School (PK-06)
  - Stoutland High School (07-12)

=== Post Secondary Schools ===
- Ozarks Technical Community College
- Drury University
- Lebanon College of Cosmetology
- Missouri State University Outreach-Lebanon

=== Public libraries ===
- Lebanon-Laclede County Library

== Communities ==
=== Cities ===
- Conway
- Lebanon (county seat)
- Richland (mostly in Pulaski County and a small part in Camden County)

=== Villages ===
- Evergreen
- Phillipsburg
- Stoutland (mostly in Camden County)

=== Townships ===
- Auglaize
- Eldridge
- Franklin
- Gasconade
- Lebanon
- Osage
- Phillipsburg
- Spring Hollow
- Washington

=== Census-designated place ===
- Bennett Springs

=== Other unincorporated places ===
- Abo
- Agnes
- Bidwell
- Brownfield
- Brush Creek
- Caffeyville
- Carrol Junction
- Case
- Competition
- Delmar
- Dove
- Drew
- Drynob
- Eldridge
- Falcon
- Grace
- Hazelgreen
- Ira
- Lynchburg
- Lyons
- Morgan
- Nebo
- Oakland
- Origanna
- Orla
- Pease
- Prosperine
- Radar
- Russ
- Saint Annie
- Sleeper
- Southard
- Winnipeg

== Politics ==
=== Local ===
The Republican Party completely controls politics at the local level in Laclede County. Republicans currently hold all of the elected positions in the county.

Laclede County, Missouri

Elected countywide officials
Assessor	Johnny North	Republican
Circuit Clerk	Wanda Tyre	Republican
County Clerk	Glenda Mott	Republican
Collector	Steve Pickering	Republican
Commissioner (presiding)	Danny Rhoades	Republican
Commissioner (district 1)	Joe Pickering	Republican
Commissioner (district 2)	Jack Glendenning	Republican
Coroner	Steve Murrell	Republican
Prosecuting Attorney	Jon Morris	Republican
Public Administrator	Karen Guinn	Republican
Recorder	Lynn Stowe	Republican
Sheriff	David Millsap	Republican
Surveyor	Robert Shotts	Republican
Treasurer	Jean Cook	Republican

=== State ===
Past gubernatorial election results
Year	Republican	Democratic	Third Parties
2024	81.59% 13,861	16.51% 2,805	1.90% 323
2020	81.58% 13,681	16.38% 2,747	2.04% 342
2016	70.96% 11,362	25.74% 4,122	3.30% 528
2012	57.00% 8,751	39.91% 6,128	3.09% 474
2008	46.96% 7,604	50.90% 8,242	2.15% 348
2004	67.23% 9,993	31.78% 4,724	1.00% 148
2000	58.33% 7,595	39.28% 5,115	2.39% 311
1996	57.01% 6,525	40.46% 4,631	2.53% 289

Laclede County is split between two of Missouri's legislative districts that elect members of the Missouri House of Representatives, both of which are represented by Republicans.

- District 123 — Diane Franklin (R-Camdenton). Consists of the northern and eastern parts of the county, including Falcon and part of Lebanon.

Missouri House of Representatives — District 123 — Laclede County (2016)
Party	Candidate	Votes	%	±%
Republican	Diane Franklin	6,194	100.00%	

Missouri House of Representatives — District 123 — Laclede County (2014)
Party	Candidate	Votes	%	±%
Republican	Diane Franklin	2,659	100.00%	

Missouri House of Representatives — District 123 — Laclede County (2012)
Party	Candidate	Votes	%	±%
Republican	Diane Franklin	5,801	100.00%	

- District 129 — Sandy Crawford (R-Buffalo). Consists of the southwestern part of the county, including Conway, Evergreen, Phillipsburg, and most of Lebanon.

Missouri House of Representatives — District 129 — Laclede County (2016)
Party	Candidate	Votes	%	±%
Republican	Sandy Crawford	7,885	89.05%	+5.24
Independent	Charles Matranga	970	10.95%	+10.95

Missouri House of Representatives — District 129 — Laclede County (2014)
Party	Candidate	Votes	%	±%
Republican	Sandy Crawford	3,281	83.81%	+7.27
Democratic	John L. Wilson	634	16.19%	−7.27

Missouri House of Representatives — District 129 — Laclede County (2012)
Party	Candidate	Votes	%	±%
Republican	Sandy Crawford	6,509	76.54%	
Democratic	John L. Wilson	1,995	23.46%	

All of Laclede County is a part of Missouri's 28th District in the Missouri Senate. The seat is currently vacant. The previous incumbent, Mike Parson, was elected lieutenant governor in 2016.

Missouri Senate — District 28 — Laclede County (2014)
Party	Candidate	Votes	%	±%
Republican	Mike Parson	6,050	100.00%	

=== Federal ===
U.S. Senate — Missouri — Laclede County (2016)
Party	Candidate	Votes	%	±%
Republican	Roy Blunt	11,316	70.53%	+19.78
Democratic	Jason Kander	3,965	24.71%	−16.52
Libertarian	Jonathan Dine	396	2.47%	−5.54
Green	Johnathan McFarland	180	1.12%	+1.12
Constitution	Fred Ryman	186	1.16%	+1.16

U.S. Senate — Missouri — Laclede County (2012)
Party	Candidate	Votes	%	±%
Republican	Todd Akin	7,721	50.75%	
Democratic	Claire McCaskill	6,278	41.23%	
Libertarian	Jonathan Dine	1,219	8.01%	

All of Laclede County is included in Missouri's 4th Congressional District and is currently represented by Vicky Hartzler (R-Harrisonville) in the U.S. House of Representatives.

U.S. House of Representatives — Missouri's 4th Congressional District — Laclede County (2016)
Party	Candidate	Votes	%	±%
Republican	Vicky Hartzler	12,908	81.49%	+0.49
Democratic	Gordon Christensen	2,353	14.85%	+0.52
Libertarian	Mark Bliss	580	3.66%	−0.92

U.S. House of Representatives — Missouri's 4th Congressional District — Laclede County (2014)
Party	Candidate	Votes	%	±%
Republican	Vicky Hartzler	5,654	81.00%	+6.06
Democratic	Nate Irvin	1,000	14.33%	−6.87
Libertarian	Herschel L. Young	320	4.58%	+1.87
Write-In	Gregory A. Cowan	6	0.09%	+0.09

U.S. House of Representatives — Missouri’s 4th Congressional District — Laclede County (2012)
Party	Candidate	Votes	%	±%
Republican	Vicky Hartzler	11,376	74.94%	
Democratic	Teresa Hensley	3,219	21.20%	
Libertarian	Thomas Holbrook	411	2.71%	
Constitution	Gregory A. Cowan	175	1.15%	

==== Political culture ====
United States presidential election results for Laclede County, Missouri
Year	Republican		Democratic		Third party(ies)	
Year	No.	%	No.	%	No.	%
1888	1,274	44.81%	1,030	36.23%	539	18.96%
1892	1,376	43.09%	1,223	38.30%	594	18.60%
1896	1,598	42.60%	2,120	56.52%	33	0.88%
1900	1,686	47.71%	1,786	50.54%	62	1.75%
1904	1,874	53.94%	1,450	41.74%	150	4.32%
1908	1,902	51.94%	1,681	45.90%	79	2.16%
1912	1,478	39.83%	1,634	44.03%	599	16.14%
1916	1,877	50.28%	1,755	47.01%	101	2.71%
1920	3,469	60.29%	2,183	37.94%	102	1.77%
1924	2,960	51.61%	2,500	43.59%	275	4.80%
1928	3,971	65.91%	2,031	33.71%	23	0.38%
1932	2,804	41.10%	3,960	58.04%	59	0.86%
1936	4,258	53.38%	3,691	46.27%	28	0.35%
1940	4,941	59.69%	3,323	40.14%	14	0.17%
1944	4,670	60.75%	3,011	39.17%	6	0.08%
1948	3,773	53.78%	3,221	45.92%	21	0.30%
1952	5,312	65.14%	2,839	34.81%	4	0.05%
1956	5,079	60.71%	3,287	39.29%	0	0.00%
1960	5,805	64.78%	3,156	35.22%	0	0.00%
1964	3,848	46.00%	4,517	54.00%	0	0.00%
1968	4,860	56.06%	2,958	34.12%	852	9.83%
1972	6,152	73.78%	2,186	26.22%	0	0.00%
1976	4,067	47.99%	4,381	51.69%	27	0.32%
1980	5,642	60.78%	3,443	37.09%	197	2.12%
1984	6,406	70.62%	2,665	29.38%	0	0.00%
1988	6,070	63.65%	3,442	36.09%	24	0.25%
1992	5,176	42.35%	4,179	34.19%	2,867	23.46%
1996	5,887	51.20%	4,047	35.19%	1,565	13.61%
2000	8,556	65.58%	4,183	32.06%	307	2.35%
2004	10,578	71.14%	4,213	28.33%	78	0.52%
2008	10,875	66.40%	5,218	31.86%	286	1.75%
2012	10,934	70.84%	4,093	26.52%	408	2.64%
2016	12,881	79.81%	2,553	15.82%	706	4.37%
2020	13,762	81.95%	2,780	16.55%	251	1.49%
2024	14,155	82.89%	2,756	16.14%	165	0.97%

=== Missouri presidential preference primary (2008) ===
Former Governor Mike Huckabee (R-Arkansas) received more votes, a total of 2,791, than any candidate from either party in Laclede County during the 2008 presidential primary.

== See also ==
- List of counties in Missouri
- National Register of Historic Places listings in Laclede County, Missouri
