= January 2008 North American storm complex =

Weather event in North America

Coordinates: 37°N 122°W

January 2008 North American superstorm
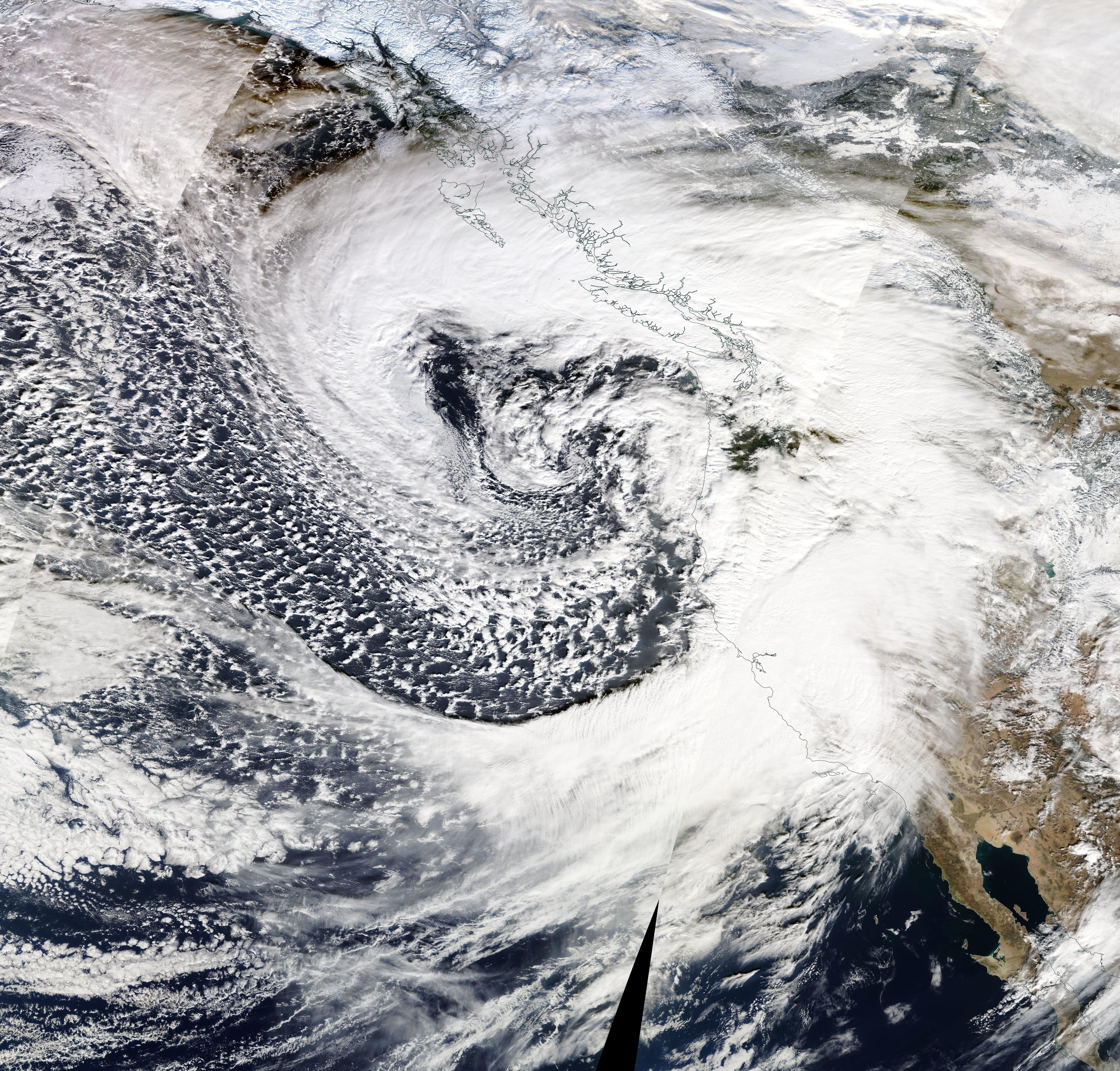
- The January 2008 North American Superstorm nearing peak intensity, on January 4, 2008

Meteorological history
- Formed: December 29, 2007 (2nd storm formed)
- Dissipated: January 22, 2008 (3rd storm dissipated)

Extratropical cyclone
- Highest gusts: 165 mph (266 km/h) at Tahoe City, California
- Lowest pressure: 956 millibars (28.2 inHg)
- Max. rainfall: 10 inches (250 mm) of rain in Loma Prieta, California; 37.7-foot (11.5 m) waves
- Max. snowfall: 132 inches (340 cm) of snow at Kirkwood Ski Resort, California

Tornado outbreak
- Tornadoes: 55 confirmed
- Max. rating: EF3 tornado

Overall effects
- Fatalities: At least 16; 1 missing
- Damage: At least $129 million
- Areas affected: Eastern Russia, Alaska, Contiguous United States, Canada, Northern Mexico, Iceland, United Kingdom, Northern Europe, European Russia
- Power outages: >1.2 million
- Part of the 2007–08 North American winter and the Tornadoes of 2008

The January 2008 North American storm complex was a powerful Pacific extratropical cyclone that affected a large portion of North America, primarily stretching from western British Columbia to near the Tijuana, Mexico area, starting on January 3, 2008. The system was responsible for flooding rains across many areas in California along with very strong winds locally exceeding hurricane force strength as well as heavy mountain snows across the Cascade and Sierra Nevada mountain chains as well as those in Idaho, Utah and Colorado. The storms were responsible for the death of at least 12 people across three states, and extensive damage to utility services as well, as damage to some other structures. The storm was also responsible for most of the January 2008 tornado outbreak from January 7–8.

== Meteorological synopsis ==
Map plotting the storm's track and intensity, according to the Saffir–Simpson scale Map key Saffir–Simpson scale Tropical depression (≤38 mph, ≤62 km/h) Tropical storm (39–73 mph, 63–118 km/h) Category 1 (74–95 mph, 119–153 km/h) Category 2 (96–110 mph, 154–177 km/h) Category 3 (111–129 mph, 178–208 km/h) Category 4 (130–156 mph, 209–251 km/h) Category 5 (≥157 mph, ≥252 km/h) Unknown Storm type Tropical cyclone Subtropical cyclone Extratropical cyclone, remnant low, tropical disturbance, or monsoon depression

The strong low-pressure system responsible for much of the extreme weather traversed much of the Pacific Ocean, before the first storm arrived late on January 3. (This storm was actually a part of a series of three storms.) On December 29, 2007, a powerful extratropical disturbance developed over eastern Siberia, which emerged into the northwest Pacific, and moved to the Aleutian Islands as a well-defined low by January 3. On January 2, another extratropical disturbance developed within a well-defined trough of low pressure, in the northeast Pacific Ocean. On January 3, the 1st storm system approached the northern part of the West Coast, powered by a Pineapple Express atmospheric river, resulting in heavy downpours of rain and strong gusts across much of the Western Seaboard. Late on January 3, the 2nd storm system in the Gulf of Alaska split, with the 3rd, new storm to the south usurping the majority of the moisture of the 2nd system. On January 4, as the 1st storm system weakened, and the southern part of the storm split off into another storm, which began moving eastward across the Southern United States. Later on the same day, as the first storm began moving ashore in British Columbia, the 3rd (and the most powerful) storm brought the largest bands of snow and rain, which impacted the Pacific Coast from British Columbia to northern Mexico, on January 4. Heavy downpours of rain, heavy snow, and fierce winds lashed the West Coast. Meanwhile, the 2nd storm system slowly moved eastward along the southern coast of Alaska, before stalling in the Gulf of Alaska on January 5. From January 4 to 5, general rainfall from the superstorm in the West Coast was around 2 inches (51 mm) of rain in Oregon and Utah, while nearly 4 inches (100 mm) fell over parts of Nevada and as much as 10 inches (250 mm) in parts of California. Snowfall amounts for those two days reached as much as 70 inches (1,800 mm) in Blackcap Basin, California, while many mountain regions of California, Nevada and Idaho received between 1 and 5 feet (1.5 m) of snow. By this time, the 3rd storm's explosive intensification had transformed the system into a massive superstorm, becoming the dominant system in the Western US. Widespread hurricane-force wind gusts were reported across most western states with winds reaching speeds of 100 mph (160 km/h) or more. The highest reported wind gusts were 165 mph (266 km/h) in Tahoe City, California, equivalent to a Category 5 hurricane on the Saffir- Simpson scale. Waves were reported as high as 37.7 feet (11.5 m) offshore Washington State. Early on January 5, the superstorm reached a minimum low pressure of 956 millibars (28.2 inHg) - the pressure equivalent of a Category 3 hurricane, becoming the most powerful storm on record to affect the West Coast, in terms of low pressure. Later on the same day, the 3rd storm began to interact with the 1st storm, which was situated over northwestern Canada, weakening that system. Also, the superstorm slowly began to weaken, and it developed a secondary low to the north of Montana, as the system gradually began to split. Late on January 6, the superstorm's secondary low became the dominant low in the system, as the storm system's circulation began to break down. On January 6, the superstorm's original low pressure center was absorbed into the 2nd storm, located just south of Alaska, while the main bulk of the storm system continued moving eastward, across Western Canada. However, the western chunk of the storm complex's moisture continued to dump rain and snow across the Western US. On the afternoon of January 6, Kirkwood Ski Resort reported 10 feet (3.0 m) of snow in 48 hours with a storm total of 11 feet.

On January 7, the storm complex weakened further, and the circulation in the western half of the storm completely collapsed, resulting in the storm's moisture spreading out throughout most of the Western United States. Soon afterwards, a few clumps of the mass of moisture organized into separate storm systems, while the dominant low over Canada stalled just southwest of Hudson Bay. As the storm complex moved westward on January 7, the instability in the air triggered a rare January tornado outbreak, spawning 55 tornadoes over the course of 2 days, resulting in the deaths of 4 more people. On January 8, the western fragment of the complex in the US dissipated, while the southern and eastern chunks continued to organize. On the same day, the 2nd storm system in the Gulf of Alaska was absorbed by another more powerful incoming extratropical cyclone, even as the main storm complex continued heading eastward across the United States. Later on January 8, the eastern chunk of the storm complex merged into the southern chunk, while the low near Hudson Bay began to deteriorate. On January 9, the low pressure center over the Great Lakes region became the dominant low of the storm complex. On the same day, the 1st storm over northern Canada was absorbed by a cold front, even as the storm complex continued to organize over the Eastern United States, triggering more tornadoes across the region. By January 9, the storm complex had organized into a 973 mbar (28.7 inHg) storm to the northeast of the Great Lakes, and it began to strip away moisture from the low near Hudson Bay. The storm complex slowly moved northeastward, and the storm's outer rainband eventually exited the East Coast. On January 10, the low west of Hudson Bay dissipated, while the main storm complex began to exit Atlantic Canada. On January 11, the storm entered Labrador Sea, and stalled for several hours, before continuing to move northeastward. At the same time, the system gradually weakened. On January 12, the system reorganized to the southeast of Greenland, and was assigned the name Ilse by the Free University of Berlin. On January 14, Windstorm Ilse intensified to 980 millibars (29 inHg) and impacted the United Kingdom and parts of Western Europe, before entering the Norwegian Sea on January 15. During the next couple of days, Ilse accelerated northeastward, before turning to the east on January 17. On January 22, Ilse was absorbed by another extratropical cyclone to the south, over the Barents Sea.

== Impacts ==
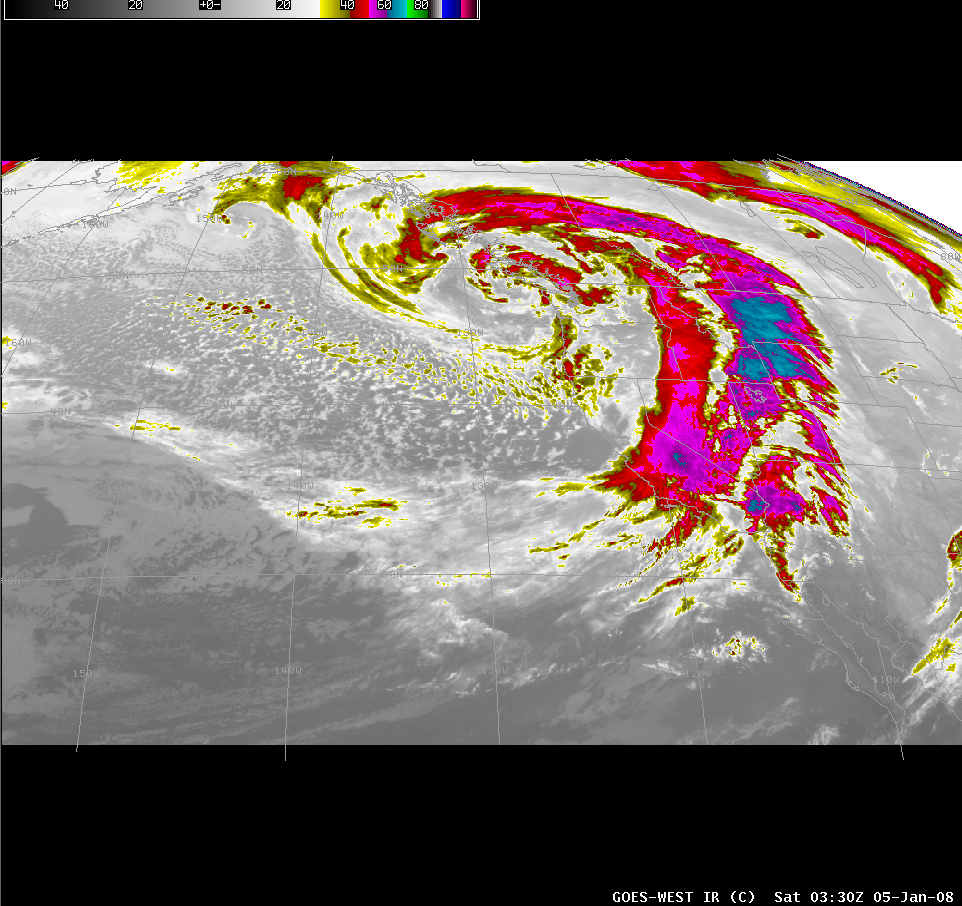
Satellite image of the system as it approached the West Coast (Courtesy of NWS Hanford, California)

Flights departing from San Francisco were grounded, while over 100 miles (160 km) of Interstate 80 was shut down in eastern California and western Nevada due to poor visibility and a 17-vehicle pile-up. Bay Area Rapid Transit was also disrupted with significant delays to service and was even interrupted between San Francisco and Daly City briefly due to fallen trees on the network's tracks.

Strong winds knocked power lines down causing power outages for 1.2 million Californians, while several outages were reported in Washington and Oregon. About 500 miles (800 km) of California power lines were damaged by the storm.

The storm closed ski resorts, toppled trees, and created mudslides. Highways from Sacramento to San Francisco were closed by debris. Meteorologists predicted about 10 feet (3.0 m) of snow by the end of the storms giving hope to Californians for more water for the year of 2008 following a drier than average 2007 water season and leading to an expected water shortage in 2008. Mandatory evacuations were ordered in Orange County in Southern California. On January 5, a canal levee ruptured near Reno, Nevada and flooded some 800 residences. At least 3000 people were rescued by helicopter from rooftops of flooded homes while cold temperatures hindered rescue efforts.

Nevada Governor Jim Gibbons declared a state of emergency for Lyon County. The Federal Emergency Management Agency was called in for emergency assistance and distribution of food and water. Bank firm Wells Fargo opened an account to collect donations for the residents of Fernley. Residents began returning home on January 7. California Governor Arnold Schwarzenegger also declared a state of emergency for three counties while Oregon Governor Ted Kulongoski declared a state of emergency for Umatilla County due to wind damage. At least 12 people were killed including two in California, eight in Utah and two in Oregon due to falling branches or trees, traffic accidents, and flooding. Eight of the fatalities were caused by the rollover of a charter bus in southeastern Utah. 7 people in one California home were hospitalized for carbon monoxide poisoning from a lantern. Several other people, including snowmobilers and skiers, were missing in the mountain regions of Colorado. Six snowmobilers were later found alive after calling for emergency services from a train station. A hiker went missing in the San Bernardino Mountains. According to an analysis conducted by meteorologists, a storm of this intensity had not struck California since the 1997–1998 North American winter storm season (as of December 2009).

=== Tornadoes ===
Confirmed tornadoes by Enhanced Fujita rating
EFU	EF0	EF1	EF2	EF3	EF4	EF5	Total
0	24	21	6	4	0	0	55

==== January 7 event ====
List of reported tornadoes – Monday, January 7, 2008
EF#	Location	County	Time (UTC)	Path length	Damage
Missouri
EF0	SW of Lowry City	St. Clair	2022	unknown	Brief tornado damaged a few trees.
EF0	SE of Lincoln	Benton	2054	unknown	A pole barn was heavily damaged.
EF0	NE of Auxvasse	Audrain	2155	0.5 mile (800 m)	Tornado damaged a machine shed, along with numerous trees and tree limbs.
EF2	N of Purdy	Barry	2306	12 miles (19.2 km)	Intermittent tornado passed between Purdy and Monett. Houses and farm buildings were damaged along the path, and eight mobile homes were destroyed at a mobile home park.
EF0	E of Pineville	McDonald	2350	0.1 mile (160 m)	Tornado caused minor tree damage.
EF2	Northern Republic to SW of Brookline	Greene	2357	6 miles (9.6 km)	Tornado impacted the northern part of Republic, where many homes were damaged, 15 of which sustained major damage or were destroyed. An Elementary School sustained major roof damage towards the end of the path before the tornado dissipated.
EF3	W of Strafford to E of Abo	Greene, Webster, Laclede	0029	26 miles (42 km)	3 deaths – Tornado began west of Strafford and passed north of town, destroying several frame homes and outbuildings. Additional frame homes were destroyed near Marshfield, along with barns and mobile homes. A semi-truck was flipped as the tornado crossed Interstate 44, and severe damage occurred in the nearby ghost town of Sampson. Numerous additional homes and outbuildings were destroyed, and multiple injuries occurred near Lebanon before the tornado dissipated. Two of the fatalities occurred in frame homes, and the other occurred in a mobile home. Over 50 homes, mobile homes, and outbuildings were destroyed along the path, numerous power poles and large trees were snapped, and 18 people were injured.
EF0	NE of Aurora	Lawrence, Christian	0128	6 miles (9.6 km)	Farmhouses and outbuildings were damaged along the path.
EF2	SW of Strafford to W of Marshfeield	Greene, Webster	0132	17 miles (29 km)	Tornado tracked just south of the previous Strafford area EF3, paralleling Interstate 44 and crossing it several times. Homes and outbuildings were heavily damaged along the path.
EF0	S of Mount Sterling	Gasconade	0150	0.25 mile (400 m)	Brief tornado touchdown caused tree damage.
EF3	NW of Hooker to NE of Jerome	Pulaski, Phelps	0206	7 miles (11 km)	Near the beginning of the path, a few homes and several outbuildings were destroyed in rural areas. The tornado clipped the north side of Jerome before dissipating, where one home and multiple additional outbuildings were destroyed.
EF1	NW of Mayflower	McDonald, Barry	0215	7 miles (11.2 km)	A few structures were heavily damaged or destroyed, along with numerous trees.
EF0	W of Clarksville	Pike	0230	5 miles (8 km)	Intermittent tornado touchdown caused some tree damage.
EF1	NE of Marshfield	Webster, Dallas	0242	6 miles (9.6 km)	One house was damaged along with a few outbuildings.
EF2	NW of Phillipsburg	Laclede	0300	5 miles (8 km)	Several outbuildings were destroyed and one house was heavily damaged. Numerous trees were uprooted as well.
EF0	W of Seligman	Barry	0312	20 yds (18 m)	Very short-lived tornado knocked a few trees down.
EF1	NW of Highlandville	Christian	0336	1.5 miles (2.4 km)	Two mobile homes were destroyed and several houses were damaged. One person was injured by flying debris.
EF1	W of Vichy	Phelps, Maries	0340	13 miles (21 km)	35 to 45 structures were damaged, with one home partially moved off its foundation and portions of the roof thrown up to a quarter of a mile away. Wind gusts of up to 84 knots were recorded by the Vichy Automated Weather Station, and a few airplanes were damaged nearby at the airport. A mobile home was destroyed as well and one person was injured.
EF0	E of Rogersville to NE of Diggins	Webster	0357	11 miles (17 km)	Tornado caused minor damage to trees and outbuildings along its path.
EF1	SW of Mountain	McDonald, Barry	0421	9 miles (15 km)	Tornado damaged trees and structures, a few of which were removed from their foundations.
Illinois
EF3	N of Poplar Grove to NE of Lawrence	Boone, McHenry	2130	13.2 miles (21 km)	Tornado initially caused minor damage to trees and a shed before striking an apple orchard at EF2 strength, where large trees were snapped and uprooted, a large barn was destroyed, and other buildings were severely damaged. EF3 damage occurred at a nearby farmstead as a poorly anchored farmhouse was swept away with only the basement remaining, and large trees on the property were denuded (though overall context was not consistent with a violent tornado). Hay bales were rolled through fields as well. The tornado weakened further along the path, causing minor EF0 and EF1 damage to farmhouses, trees, power lines, barns, and sheds. The tornado strengthened again, reaching EF2 strength as it struck the small town of Lawrence, where extensive tree damage occurred, a house had more than half its roof torn off and its detached garage destroyed, other homes sustained shingle damage, and a train carrying hazardous materials was derailed, resulting in an evacuation of the town. Past Lawrence, the tornado overturned a semi-truck and caused EF1 damage to barns and trees before dissipating. It was the first tornado in northeastern Illinois in the month of January since 1950. Five people were injured.
EF1	S of Mackinaw	Tazewell	2322	3 miles (4.8 km)	Tornado destroyed a pole barn and damaged a house, along with a few outbuildings. In addition, a chain link fence and a few tree limbs were blown down.
EF0	SE of Pleasant Hill	Pike	0240	2.75 miles (4.4 km)	Intermittent tornado caused some tree damage.
Wisconsin
EF3	SE of Walworth to NW of Paddock Lake	Walworth, Kenosha	2202	10.8 miles (17 km)	This was the northernmost January tornado in the US since 1967. Near Walworth, the tornado uprooted trees and caused minor EF1 damage to homes and outbuildings. The tornado rapidly intensified to high-end EF3 strength, tearing through multiple subdivisions as it struck Wheatland, where 25 homes were destroyed, 27 sustained major damage, 25 sustained minor damage, and 7 were affected in some way. Further along the path, the tornado impacted the small town of Brighton, where 4 homes were destroyed, 3 sustained major damage, 3 sustained minor damage, and 10 were affected in some way. A large barn was destroyed before the tornado dissipated near Paddock Lake. Numerous large trees were snapped and denuded along the path, and 15 people were injured. Some of the homes destroyed were leveled, though they were poorly anchored and context did not support a rating higher than EF3.
EF1	Northern Kenosha	Kenosha	2239	2.4 miles (3.9 km)	Rope tornado tracked through the northern part of Kenosha. 5 homes were left uninhabitable, 6 sustained major damage, and 21 others sustained minor damage. Power lines were toppled and numerous trees were snapped or uprooted as well.
Arkansas
EF0	S of Hiwasse	Benton	0205	unknown	Brief tornado remained over open country, causing no damage.
EF0	E of Centerton	Benton	0250	unknown	Brief tornado remained over open country, causing no damage.
EF1	SW of Decatur	Benton	0509	2.6 miles (4.2 km)	Tornado caused extensive tree damage.
Oklahoma
EF0	SW of Watts	Adair	0208	unknown	Brief tornado remained over open country, causing no damage.
EF0	N of Moodys	Cherokee	0428	unknown	Tornado caused roof damage to homes, damaged several barns, and uprooted trees.
EF0	NE of Porter	Wagoner	0538	1 miles (1.6 km)	Tornado caused extensive tree damage.
EF0	NE of Wagoner	Wagoner	0554	2.7 miles (4.4 km)	Tornado caused extensive tree damage.
Sources: Storm reports of January 7, 2008, NWS Milwaukee, NWS Springfield, KY3 News, NWS Chicago, NWS St. Louis, NWS Tulsa

==== January 8 event ====
List of reported tornadoes – Tuesday, January 8, 2008
EF#	Location	County	Time (UTC)	Path length	Damage
Missouri
EF1	NE of Washburn	Barry	0822	7 miles (11 km)	Several houses and outbuildings were damaged, along with numerous trees.
EF1	E of Cassville	Barry, Stone	0831	14 miles (22 km)	Several poultry barns, sheds, and outbuildings were heavily damaged or destroyed, and numerous trees were downed.
EF1	Springfield	Greene	0837	1 mile (1.6 km)	Tornado moved through the northern part of downtown Springfield, causing a warehouse to collapse. Several homes sustained minor damage, and a Krispy Kreme sign was destroyed.
EF1	Highlandville	Christian	0850	5 miles (8 km)	Tornado tracked through town, damaging several homes and a church. Several outbuildings and highway signs were destroyed as well.
EF0	Branson to Hollister	Taney	0901	2.88 miles (90 m)	Tornado touched down at the Thousand Hills Resort in Branson, damaging three condominiums. In Hollister, a mobile home park was damaged.
EF0	SW of Bracken to SW of Susanna	Webster	0916	7 miles (11.2 km)	Tornado embedded in a squall line caused minor tree and structure damage.
EF0	SW of Tigris to SE of Mount Zion	Douglas	0917	10 miles (16 km)	Barns and outbuildings were damaged or destroyed, and multiple trees were uprooted or snapped.
EF2	S of Niangua	Webster	0918	5 miles (8 km)	Several homes and outbuildings were destroyed.
EF1	SW of Mountain Grove	Douglas	0943	1.5 miles (2.4 km)	One mobile home was moved from its foundation, a barn and some outbuildings were damaged, and significant tree damage occurred.
EF1	SE of Dawson to SE of Bado	Wright, Texas	0945	12 miles (19.2 km)	A few barns and outbuildings were damaged along the path.
EF0	W of West Plains	Howell	1020	unknown	Brief tornado damaged two outbuildings and a mobile home.
EF1	SW of Eminence	Shannon	1027	1.5 miles (2.4 km)	Numerous trees were snapped or uprooted, but no structures were impacted along the path.
EF1	NE of Eminence	Shannon	1038	10 miles (16 km)	Two barns and a garage were destroyed, and another barn was damaged. Numerous trees were snapped or uprooted as well.
EF0	SW of Alton	Oregon	1059	1 mile (1.6 km)	Tornado damaged a few outbuildings south of Alton. A motorcycle shop sustained the most damage as a barn that sheltered several new motorcycles was destroyed.
EF1	NE of Essex	Stoddard	1840	4.2 miles (6.8 km)	One house was heavily damaged, with part of the roof torn off and debris scattered 100 to 200 yards. Three outbuildings and an equipment shed were destroyed, and a trailer was thrown about 75 yards. Approximately ten power poles were snapped in half, vehicle windows were blown out, and a few large trees were snapped. A pump house was blown into a propane tank, causing a propane leak as well.
Arkansas
EF2	SW of Appleton to W of Beverage Town	Pope, Conway, Van Buren	1440	20.5 miles (33 km)	1 death – Major damage occurred near Appleton, with 42 homes damaged in that area. Of these, seven were destroyed, six had minor damage, and the rest had moderate to heavy damage. In addition, six chicken houses, two barns, and a number of outbuildings were destroyed, a travel trailer and motor home were overturned, and hundreds of trees were blown down. A man was killed when his mobile home was destroyed in this area. Near Jerusalem, 3 homes were destroyed, and 12 others suffered damage ranging from light to heavy. Ten other structures, such as chicken houses and barns were destroyed, with 13 such structures damaged. A church was destroyed and an adjacent cemetery was damaged in this area as well. Three natural gas well sites were also damaged but there was no release of gas. The tornado moved into the Ozark National Forest, where hundreds of trees were blown down before it dissipated. Two other people were injured.
EF0	SE of Princedale to SE of Twist	Cross	1926	11 miles (17.6 km)	A mobile home lost its roof, irrigation sprinklers were blown over, and trees and power lines were knocked down.
EF1	S of Deckerville	Poinsett	1952	250 yds (225 m)	Brief touchdown damaged two houses and destroyed a shed. Numerous trees were downed and debris was scattered across a nearby field.
EF1	S of Osceola	Mississippi	2020	3.5 miles (5.6 km)	Numerous home sustained roof damage and many trees were downed. A metal farm equipment building was shifted from its foundation, and a vehicle was destroyed as well.
Tennessee
EF1	NE of Double Bridges to NW of Bonicord	Lauderdale, Dyer	2058	7 miles (11 km)	Multiple homes were damaged, including two that had their roofs blown off, one of which was shifted off of its foundation. Outbuildings, fences, garages, and machine sheds were destroyed as well. A mobile home was also destroyed, and many trees and power lines were downed.
Mississippi
EF0	S of Church Hill	Jefferson	2130	4 miles (6.4 km)	Trees were downed in a convergent pattern.
EF1	NW of Harrisville to E of Everett	Simpson	2337	20 miles (32 km)	A house had a large section of its roof torn off, and nearby outbuilding was blown away and destroyed. Another home and several outbuildings sustained lesser damage. Extensive tree damage occurred along the path.
EF0	SE of Puckett	Rankin	0011	unknown	Several trees were downed and a home sustained shingle damage.
Sources: Storm reports of January 8, 2008, NWS Little Rock, NWS Paducah, NWS Jackson (MS), NWS Memphis

== See also ==
- January 1993 Tijuana floods
- Winter storms of 2007–08
- January 2008 tornado outbreak
- October 2009 North American storm complex
- January 2010 North American winter storms
- October 2010 North American storm complex
- December 2010 North American blizzard
- November 2012 nor'easter
- February 2013 nor'easter
- March 2013 nor'easter
- November 2014 Bering Sea bomb cyclone
- December 2014 North American storm complex
