= Tornado outbreak of April 1880 =

Cluster of tornadoes in American Midwest

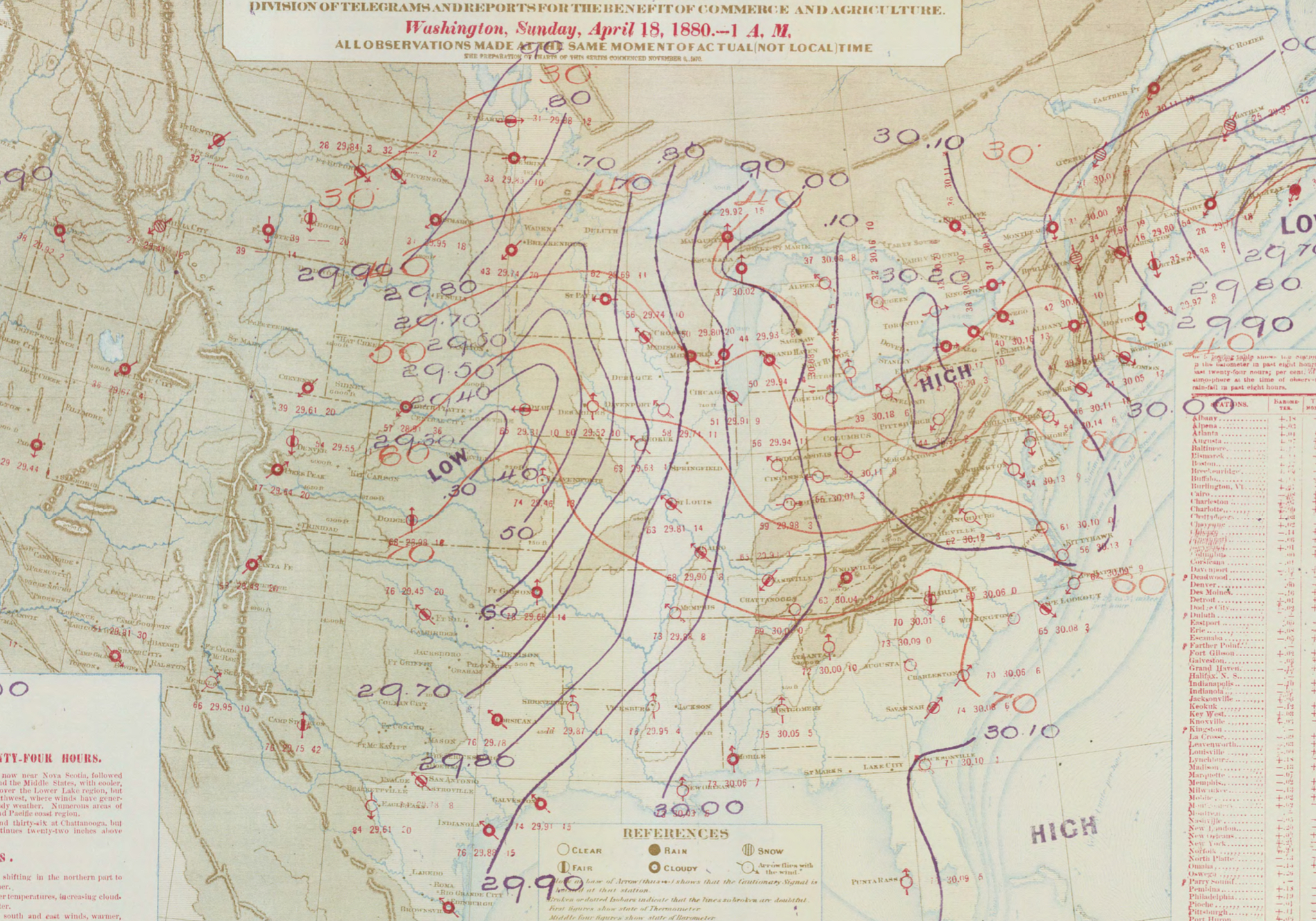
- Weather map of the storm complex over the Central United States that would produce the tornado outbreak on April 18, 1880.

Tornado outbreak
- Tornadoes: ≥ 27
- Max. rating: F4 tornado
- Duration: April 18–20, 1880
- Highest winds: 80 mph (130 km/h) in Lawrence, Kansas

Overall effects
- Fatalities: ≥ 167
- Injuries: > 516
- Damage: > $1,175,000 ($39,200,000 in 2025 USD) (Note: All losses are in 1916 United States dollars unless otherwise noted.)
- Areas affected: Midwestern and Southern United States
- Part of the tornadoes and tornado outbreaks of 1880

On April 18–20, 1880, a tornado outbreak impacted the Midwestern United States, producing numerous strong tornadoes, killing at least 167 people, and injuring more than 516 others. (Note: An outbreak is generally defined as a group of at least six tornadoes (the number sometimes varies slightly according to local climatology) with no more than a six-hour gap between individual tornadoes. An outbreak sequence, prior to (after) the start of modern records in 1950, is defined as a period of no more than two (one) consecutive days without at least one significant (F2 or stronger) tornado.) The outbreak generated five violent tornadoes, including three long-tracked F4 tornadoes in Missouri that killed at least 144 people. Two of the tornadoes followed parallel paths and occurred simultaneously near Springfield, one of which devastated the town of Marshfield, causing 92 fatalities there. Other deadly, intense tornadoes occurred in the Great Lakes region and in Arkansas, including another F4 tornado that destroyed a third of El Paso, Arkansas, killing four or more people.

== Confirmed tornadoes ==
Confirmed tornadoes by Fujita rating
FU	F0	F1	F2	F3	F4	F5	Total
3	0	0	16	3	5	0	≥ 27*

- On April 18 a tornado may have damaged 26 structures at Oakbower in Crawford County, Arkansas.

Prior to 1990, there is a likely undercount of tornadoes, particularly E/F0–1, with reports of weaker tornadoes becoming more common as population increased. A sharp increase in the annual average E/F0–1 count by approximately 200 tornadoes was noted upon the implementation of NEXRAD Doppler weather radar in 1990–1991. (Note: Historically, the number of tornadoes globally and in the United States was and is likely underrepresented: research by Grazulis on annual tornado activity suggests that, as of 2001, only 53% of yearly U.S. tornadoes were officially recorded. Documentation of tornadoes outside the United States was historically less exhaustive, owing to the lack of monitors in many nations and, in some cases, to internal political controls on public information. Most countries only recorded tornadoes that produced severe damage or loss of life. Significant low biases in U.S. tornado counts likely occurred through the early 1990s, when advanced NEXRAD was first installed and the National Weather Service began comprehensively verifying tornado occurrences.) 1974 marked the first year where significant tornado (E/F2+) counts became homogenous with contemporary values, attributed to the consistent implementation of Fujita scale assessments. (Note: The Fujita scale was devised under the aegis of scientist T. Theodore Fujita in the early 1970s. Prior to the advent of the scale in 1971, tornadoes in the United States were officially unrated. Tornado ratings were retroactively applied to events prior to the formal adoption of the F-scale by the National Weather Service. While the Fujita scale has been superseded by the Enhanced Fujita scale in the U.S. since February 1, 2007, Canada used the old scale until April 1, 2013; nations elsewhere, like the United Kingdom, apply other classifications such as the TORRO scale.) Numerous discrepancies on the details of tornadoes in this outbreak exist between sources. The total count of tornadoes and ratings differs from various agencies accordingly. The list below documents information from the most contemporary official sources alongside assessments from tornado historian Thomas P. Grazulis.

=== April 18 event ===
List of confirmed tornadoes – Sunday, April 18, 1880
F#	Location	County / Parish	State	Time (UTC) (Note: All dates are based on the local time zone where the tornado touched down; however, all times are in Coordinated Universal Time and dates are split at midnight CST/CDT for consistency.)	Path length	Width (Note: The listed width values are primarily the average/mean width of the tornadoes, with those having known maximum widths denoted by ♯. From 1952 to 1994, reports largely list mean width whereas contemporary years list maximum width. Values provided by Grazulis are the average width, with estimates being rounded down (i.e. 0.5 mi (0.80 km) is rounded down from 880 yards to 800 yards.)	Damage
F2	S of Pineville to Cyclone to ENE of Powell	McDonald	MO	22:00–?	15 mi (24 km)	Unknown	Unknown
F2	1 death – An intermittent tornado killed a child, but otherwise did unspecified damage.						
F4	S of Rockton (IL) to near Turtleville (WI) to western Shopiere (WI)	Winnebago (IL), Rock (WI)	IL, WI	22:30–?	15 mi (24 km)	500 yd (460 m)	$75,000
F4	1 death – A violent tornado obliterated a pair of farms in Illinois, leaving little debris behind. The only F4 damage occurred there, just south-southwest of Beloit, Wisconsin. 23 structures were unroofed, destroyed, or otherwise damaged in Wisconsin, indicating F2 or F3 intensity. 20 people were injured. Two-thirds of the losses were at Shopiere. Wind-related damage extended to near Johnstown.						
F3	ENE of Edgerton	Johnson	KS	22:30–?	5 mi (8.0 km)	Unknown	Unknown
F3	1 death – An intense tornado destroyed one or more homes, killing a mother.						
F4	S of Rocky Comfort to SE of Grovespring	McDonald, Barry, Stone, Christian, Greene, Webster, Wright	MO	22:30–?	93 mi (150 km)	1,200 yd (1,100 m)	Unknown
F4	31+ deaths – Dubbed the Finley Creek tornado, this was the first, strongest, and southernmost of two violent, long-tracked, parallel events south of Springfield, each of which was seen 20 to 55 minutes—about 30 mi (48 km)—apart at times. While tracking 5–10 mi (8.0–16.1 km) south of its successor, it first devastated a settlement on Crane Creek, killing 10 people there, and then killed six more beside Flat Creek. The tornado attained its maximum intensity over rural land in the Ozark–Linden area, destroying 35 farms, killing eight people, and injuring 52 others, 19 badly. Seven or more fatalities occurred in southernmost Webster County. Some of the worst damage occurred at Dry Fork, along Panther Creek, near Fordland. In all 100 people were injured.						
F4	NE of McDowell to Marshfield to Niangua	Barry, Lawrence, Stone, Christian, Greene, Webster	MO	22:30–?	64 mi (103 km)	800 yd (730 m)	Unknown
F4	99+ deaths – See section on this tornado – 200 people were injured.						
F2	Conway	Laclede	MO	23:30–?	Unknown	Unknown	Unknown
F2	2 deaths – A tornado wrecked a house, killing a few children.						
F2	Near Skullyville (IT) to N of Charleston (AR)	Choctaw Nation (IT), Sebastian (AR), Franklin (AR)	IT, AR	23:30–?	35 mi (56 km)	Unknown	Unknown
F2	4 deaths – Forming over present-day Leflore County, Oklahoma, a strong tornado family wrecked five or more homes and caused one fatality in Oklahoma. Entering Arkansas, it claimed two more lives in a home near Fort Smith, injuring five people nearby. The final death occurred near Charleston. 20 injuries were confirmed.						
F3	Near Stiles (IA) to W of Troy (IA)	Schuyler (MO), Davis (IA)	MO, IA	23:30–?	15 mi (24 km)	150 yd (140 m)	Unknown
F3	An intense tornado hit seven farms, destroying many buildings and moving debris 4 mi (6.4 km). Two injuries occurred.						
F4	NE of Climax Springs to Barnettsville to N of New Bloomfield	Camden, Morgan, Miller, Moniteau, Cole, Callaway	MO	23:30–?	65 mi (105 km)	1,760 yd (1,610 m)♯	Unknown
F4	14 deaths – A tornado leveled numerous farmsteads and caused five deaths in southern Morgan County. The 1-mile-wide (1.6 km) funnel wrecked Barnettsville, shattering buildings and causing eight deaths there. Heavily damaging the Lohman–Russellville area, it did spotty damage afterward. Near New Bloomfield it destroyed a church and 10 homes, causing another death. The tornado left debris on the Missouri Pacific Railroad near Scott, causing a passenger train to derail and resulting in a few injuries. Injuries totaled 90.						
F2	Southern Ottawa to S of Oconomowoc	Waukesha	WI	00:00–?	6 mi (9.7 km)	300 yd (270 m)	Unknown
F2	A tornado destroyed a pair of barns and caused minor damage to 12 other structures, including homes. It also unroofed a home near Waterville and killed sheep. One injury was reported.						
F2	Between Elston and Centertown to Carrington	Cole, Boone, Callaway	MO	00:00–?	21 mi (34 km)	100 yd (91 m)	Unknown
F2	2 deaths – A tornado destroyed or damaged farmhouses near Fulton. Eight or more injuries occurred in Callaway County, along with deaths.						
F2	Bloomfield to W of Floris to near Lick Creek	Davis	IA	02:00–?	8 mi (13 km)	200 yd (180 m)	Unknown
F2	A tornado destroyed and unroofed a farmhouse, while partly unroofing an Odd Fellows lodge. It also damaged other structures, treetops, and fences.						
F2	Near Dardanelle	Yell	AR	02:00–?	Unknown	Unknown	Unknown
F2	A tornado destroyed a number of homes.						
FU	Franks	Pulaski	MO	02:00–?	Unknown	Unknown	Unknown
FU	This tornado belonged to the Marshfield family.						
F2	SW of Licking to SW of Salem	Texas, Dent	MO	02:10–?	25 mi (40 km)	400 yd (370 m)	Unknown
F2	1 death – A tornado damaged most of Licking, leaving 300 people homeless. It rendered 64 of the 67 homes in town uninhabitable, of which it wrecked 29, injuring 17 people, five seriously.						
F2	Southeastern Fayetteville	Washington	AR	02:20–?	6 mi (9.7 km)	100 yd (91 m)	$100,000
F2	2 deaths – A tornado destroyed or badly damaged at least 100 structures in Fayetteville, including homes and a three-story hotel. Trees and fences were downed as well. 25 injuries were reported, many of which were severe. This or a related tornado may have subsequently struck and destroyed Goshen.						
F4	El Paso	Faulkner, White	AR	02:30–?	8 mi (13 km)	400 yd (370 m)	Unknown
F4	4+ deaths – A violent tornado virtually leveled a third of El Paso, where all known fatalities occurred. Four bodies were reportedly carried 1 mi (1.6 km) and homesites were swept clean, with debris being found 2 mi (3.2 km) away. 15 injuries occurred. According to tornado historian Thomas P. Grazulis, some sources listed as many as 10 deaths, of which three or more belonged to multiple "prominent" families each.						
F2	Western Eureka Springs	Carroll	AR	03:00–?	10 mi (16 km)	Unknown	Unknown
F2	1 death – A tornado destroyed 18 homes, inflicting eight injuries. Its path may have crossed into southern Missouri.						
F2+	Forsyth	Taney	MO	03:30–?	Unknown	Unknown	Unknown
F2+	2 deaths – Based on contextual evidence, a tornado of unknown but likely significant—at least F2—intensity hit town, possibly resulting in multiple injuries, and "cut across" Taney County, Grazulis reported.						
F2	Near Chester	Eaton	MI	Unknown	Unknown	440 yd (400 m)♯	Unknown
F2	A strong tornado "clear-cut" timber, killing livestock and leveling barns, Grazulis noted.						
F2	Near Lyndon	Whiteside	IL	Unknown	8 mi (13 km)	Unknown	Unknown
F2	A tornado wrecked outbuildings on half a dozen farmsteads.						
FU	Cuba	Crawford	MO	Unknown	Unknown	Unknown	Unknown
FU	According to the Monthly Weather Review, a tornado "laid waste" to the town and its environs.						
FU	Greenville	Bond	IL	Unknown	Unknown	Unknown	Unknown
FU	A tornado destroyed many homes and other structures, reportedly causing several major injuries.						

=== April 19 event ===
List of confirmed tornadoes – Monday, April 19, 1880
F#	Location	County / Parish	State	Time (UTC)	Path length	Width	Damage
F3	S of Gravelly to near Bluffton to S of Rover	Yell	AR	05:00–?	25 mi (40 km)	200 yd (180 m)	Unknown
F3	1 death – This intense tornado destroyed several small homes at near-F4 intensity, lofting debris for miles. Five injuries were reported.						
F2	N of Fort Smith	Crawford	AR	05:00–?	Unknown	Unknown	Unknown
F2	A tornado downed trees and barns.						
F2	N of Dyersburg	Dyer	TN	16:00–?	4 mi (6.4 km)	200 yd (180 m)	Unknown
F2	1 death – A tornado unroofed and wrecked several homes. A tree fell onto one of them, killing a woman. Five injuries were reported.						

=== April 20 event ===
List of confirmed tornadoes – Tuesday, April 20, 1880
F#	Location	County / Parish	State	Time (UTC)	Path length	Width	Damage
F2	Near Griffin	Spalding	GA	12:30–?	2 mi (3.2 km)	50 yd (46 m)	Unknown
F2	A tornado splintered trees and unroofed homes.						

=== Springfield–Marshfield, Missouri ===
Springfield–Marshfield, Missouri
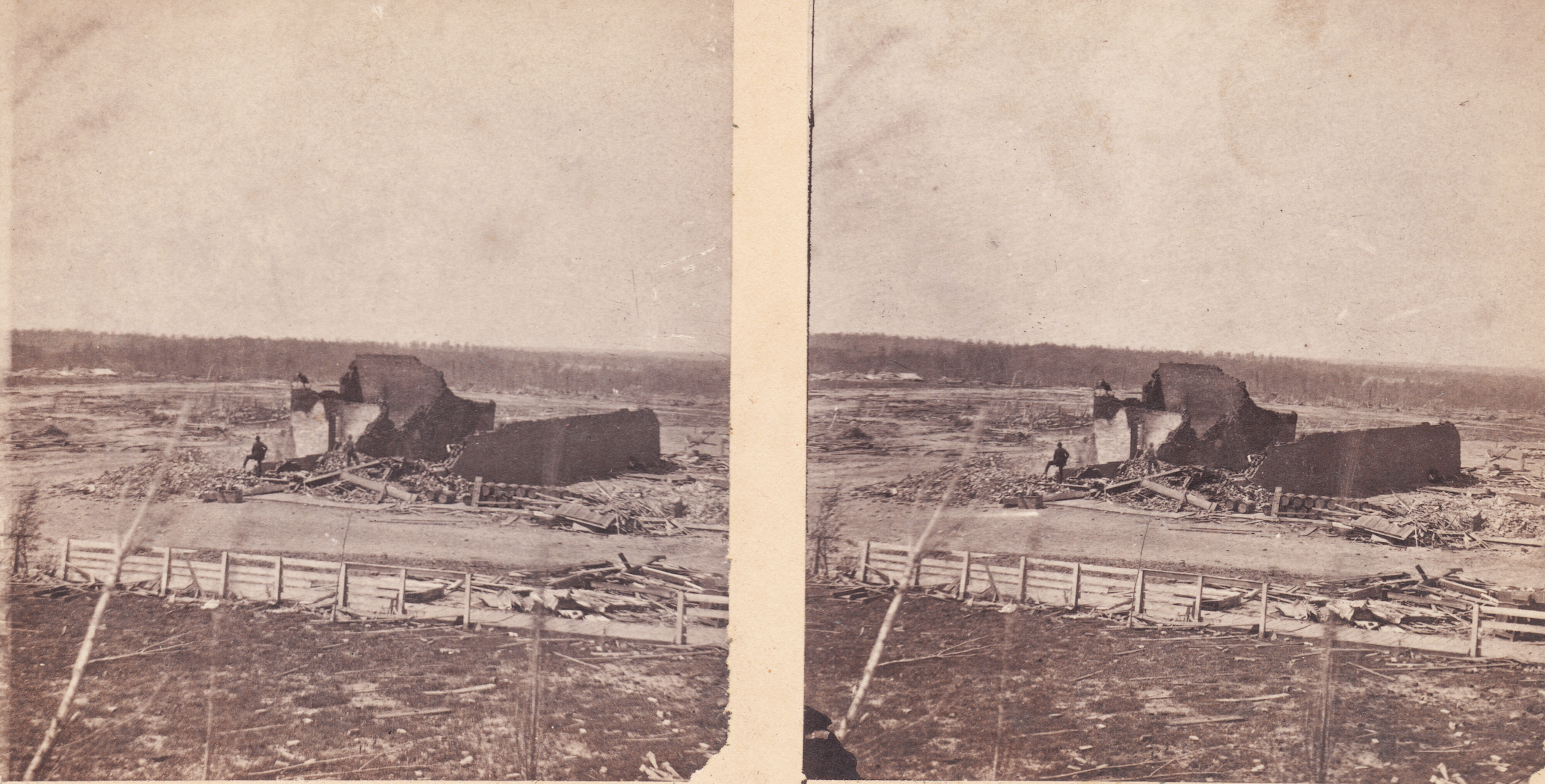
- Damage in Marshfield

F4 tornado
- on the Fujita scale

Overall effects
- Fatalities: 99+
- Injuries: 200

Belonging to a pair of long-lived F4s, this violent tornado—possibly a family—formed near Camp Bliss Springs, a short distance from McDowell in northeastern Barry County, Missouri. In Stone County this and the previous F4 hit just 3 to 4 mi (4.8 to 6.4 km) apart near Aurora; as it crossed the county the former may have dissipated and redeveloped. Entering Christian County, the Marshfield F4 tracked south of Clever and north of present-day Boaz. Near Nixa in Greene County the tornado damaged many rural buildings and large tracts of timber. It then hit southeastern Springfield, causing seven or more deaths and 16 injuries there. Paralleling the James River, the tornado widened and intensified as it approached Marshfield (population 1,100–2,000 in 1880). After hitting Northview, the 1/2-mile-wide (0.80 km) tornado then struck downtown Marshfield, where it leveled most frame-and-brick structures in town, leaving between six and 15 intact. Of the 92 dead in town, 69 perished "within seconds" and the 23 remainders died within a few weeks, according to a study by Grant L. Darkow. Between 150–200 people were badly injured as well. According to the Monthly Weather Review, the tornado also shredded and ripped up 3-foot-diameter (0.91 m) trees, whose bark was stripped off "as if struck by lightning". In Webster and Greene counties alone losses from both F4s exceeded $1 million. Leaving Marshfield, the tornado continued as far as Niangua, 6 mi (9.7 km) beyond, before dissipating.

== Other effects ==
In addition to tornadoes, there were numerous reports of severe thunderstorms. On April 18 intense windstorms affected Decatur, Wenona, Warren, Champaign, Ottawa, Peoria, Summerfield, Jacksonville, Tuscola, Clinton, Collinsville, and Chester, Illinois. These storms unroofed, destroyed, or partly wrecked numerous structures. Trees were extensively damaged and a bridge torn out as well. On the same date vigorous thunderstorms generated winds of up to 80 mph (130 km/h) in Lawrence, Kansas, tipping structures onto their sides and tearing roofs off. Early on April 19 severe thunderstorms also affected Richmond and Wabash, Indiana, along with other areas beside the White River. Telegraph wires and structures incurred substantial damage.

== See also ==
- List of North American tornadoes and tornado outbreaks

== Sources ==
- Agee, Ernest M.; Childs, Samuel (June 1, 2014). "Adjustments in Tornado Counts, F-Scale Intensity, and Path Width for Assessing Significant Tornado Destruction". Journal of Applied Meteorology and Climatology. 53 (6). American Meteorological Society: 1494–1505. Bibcode:2014JApMC..53.1494A. doi:10.1175/JAMC-D-13-0235.1.
- Brooks, Harold E. (April 2004). "On the Relationship of Tornado Path Length and Width to Intensity". Weather and Forecasting. 19 (2). Boston: American Meteorological Society: 310–19. Bibcode:2004WtFor..19..310B. doi:10.1175/1520-0434(2004)019<0310:OTROTP>2.0.CO;2.
- Cook, A. R.; Schaefer, J. T. (August 2008). "The Relation of El Niño–Southern Oscillation (ENSO) to Winter Tornado Outbreaks". Monthly Weather Review. 136 (8). Boston: American Meteorological Society: 3135. Bibcode:2008MWRv..136.3121C. doi:10.1175/2007MWR2171.1.
- Edwards, Roger; LaDue, James G.; Ferree, John T.; Scharfenberg, Kevin; Maier, Chris; Coulbourne, William L. (May 1, 2013). "Tornado Intensity Estimation: Past, Present, and Future". Bulletin of the American Meteorological Society. 94 (5). American Meteorological Society: 641–653. Bibcode:2013BAMS...94..641E. doi:10.1175/BAMS-D-11-00006.1.
- Grazulis, Thomas P. (May 1984). Violent Tornado Climatography, 1880–1982. OSTI (Technical report). NUREG. Washington, D.C.: Nuclear Regulatory Commission. OSTI 7099491. CR-3670.
  - — (November 1990). Significant Tornadoes 1880–1989. Vol. 2. St. Johnsbury, Vermont: The Tornado Project of Environmental Films. ISBN 1-879362-02-3.
  - — (July 1993). Significant Tornadoes 1680–1991: A Chronology and Analysis of Events. St. Johnsbury, Vermont: The Tornado Project of Environmental Films. ISBN 1-879362-03-1.
  - — (2001a). The Tornado: Nature's Ultimate Windstorm. Norman, Oklahoma: University of Oklahoma Press. ISBN 978-0-8061-3538-0.
  - — (2001b). F5-F6 Tornadoes. St. Johnsbury, Vermont: The Tornado Project of Environmental Films.
- "Winds" (PDF). Monthly Weather Review. 8 (4). Boston: American Meteorological Society: 10–13. April 1880. doi:10.1175/1520-0493(1880)84[10b:W]2.0.CO;2. Archived from the original (PDF) on March 3, 2017.
