= Marshfield Cyclone =

1880 tornado in Missouri, U.S.

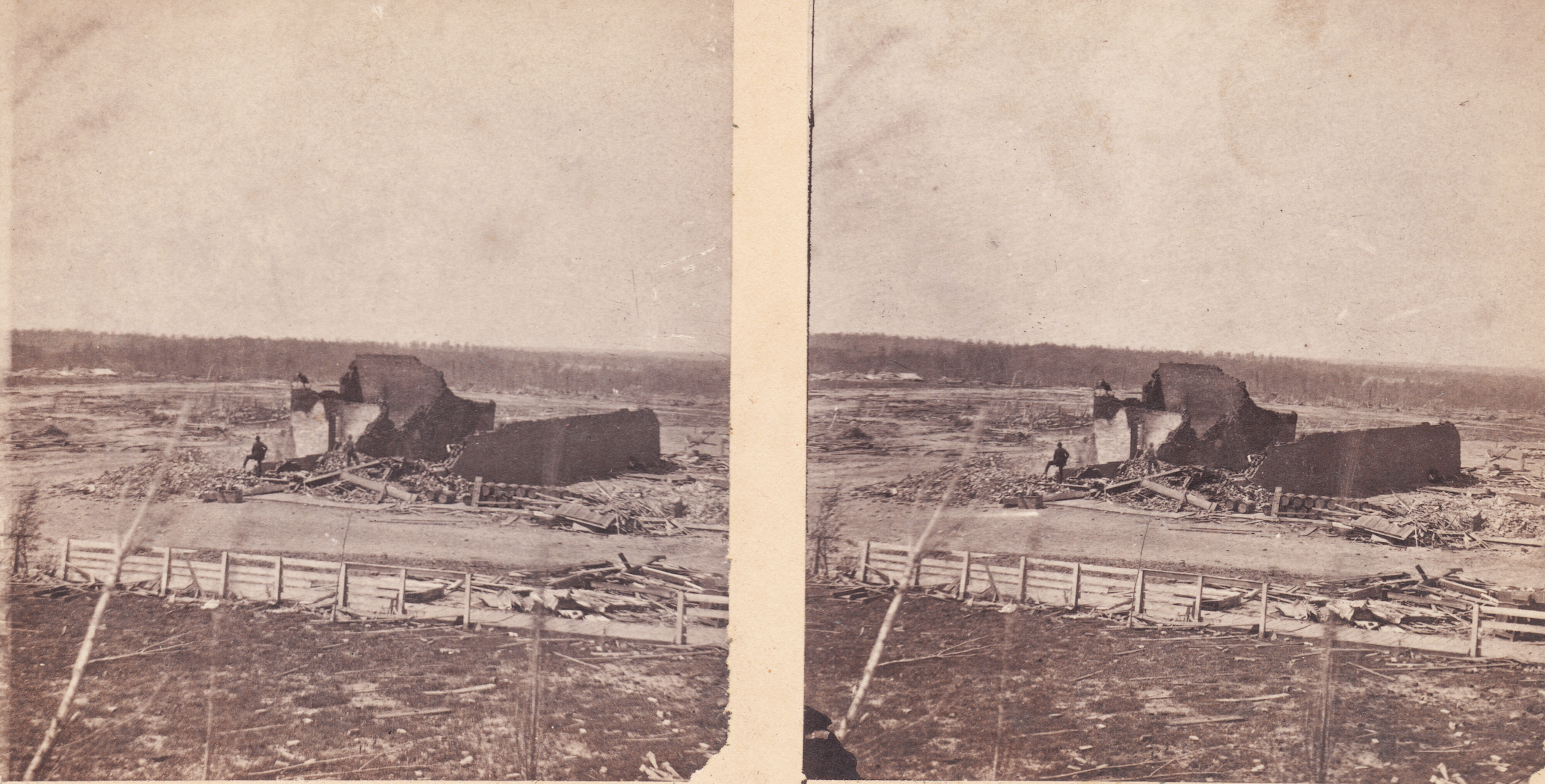
- A stereo card of heavy damage to a building in the Marshfield area

Meteorological history
- Date: April 18, 1880

F4 tornado
- on the Fujita scale

Overall effects
- Fatalities: 99
- Injuries: 200 (estimated)
- Damage: ~$1 million (1880 USD)
- Part of the Tornado outbreak of April 1880

In the evening hours of April 18, 1880, a devastating F4-rated tornado struck several communities in the Springfield metropolitan area, Missouri, killing 99 people and injuring an estimated 200 others. The tornado is commonly known as the Marshfield Cyclone because it directly impacted the city of Marshfield, where almost every building within city limits was leveled.

== Meteorological synopsis ==
Witnesses to the event said that it seemed like a normal spring day prior to the tornado, but that the temperatures around dropped as the day progressed. The sky turned green and large hail rained around the Marshfield area. The sky continued to darken before the tornado touched down.

== Tornado summary ==
The tornado first touched down near Camp Bliss Springs, approximately 3 miles (4.8 km) northeast of McDowell. The town of McDowell was hit by a separate tornado later in the day, but was never hit by the Marshfield tornado. The tornado moved to the east as it crossed Jenkins Creek before moving through Crane Creek Township. At around this time, two other weaker tornadoes may have run parallel to the Marshfield tornado, producing damage paths to the north and south. The tornado lost and later regained its condensation funnel as it moved through Stone County. The tornado then moved through Christian County to the south of Clever, before moving approximately 1 mile (1.6 km) north of Boaz. Shortly after passing near Boaz, the tornado tracked through Greene County, near the town of Nixa. Francis Eugene Nipher conducted a damage survey of the tornado's path through Greene County; he noted that the path reached a maximum width of 1,800 feet (0.34 mi; 550 m) in county limits. The tornado killed seven and injured sixteen others in Greene County, producing extensive structural damage to southeastern Springfield.

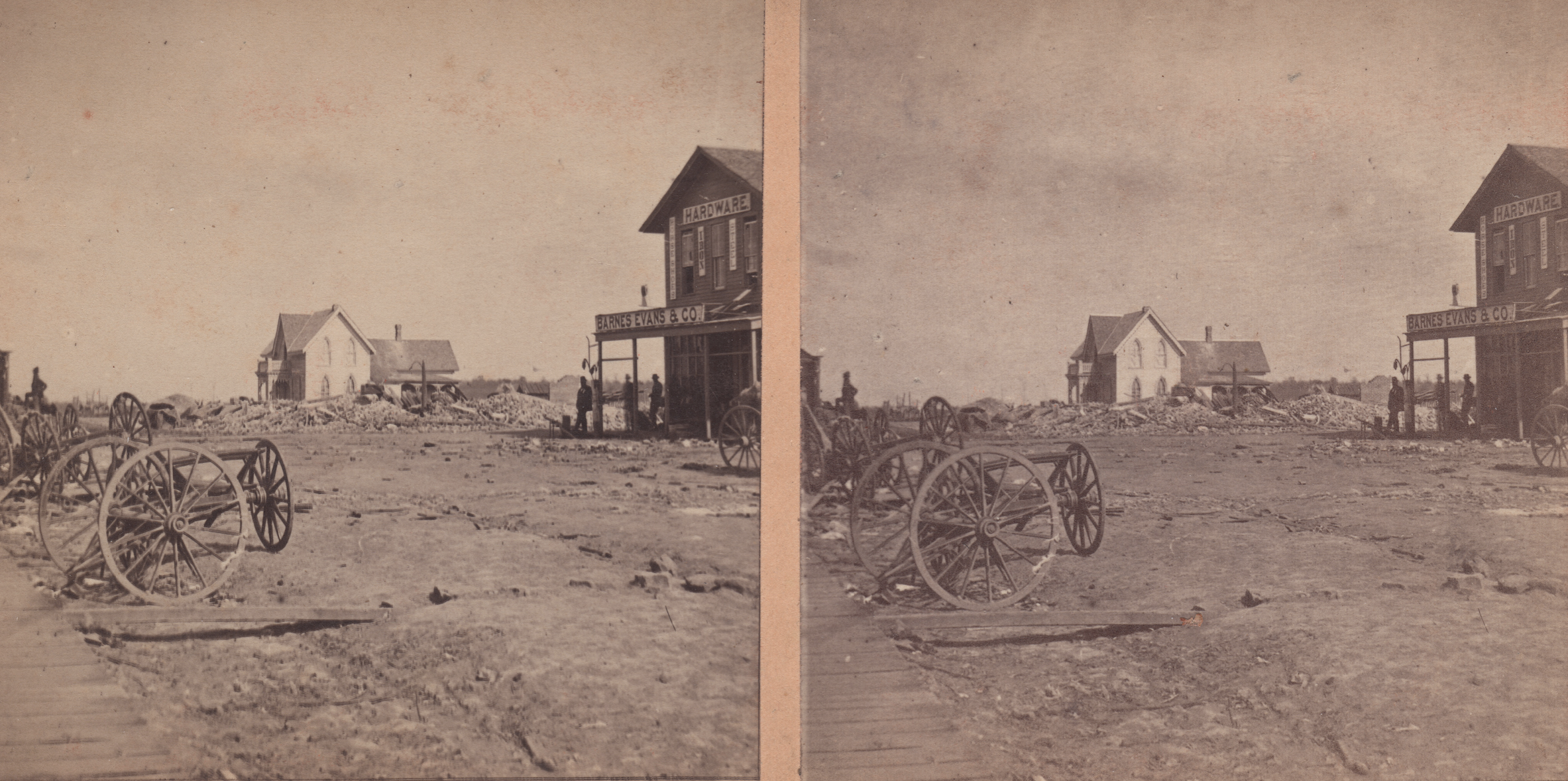
Damage in Marshfield from the tornado

The tornado entered into Webster County and struck the community of Northview, located 7 miles (11 km) miles to the southwest of Marshfield, which was directly in the tornado's path. The tornado paralleled railroad tracks stretching from Northview to Marshfield, bearing down on the town. An April 1880 publication of the Atchison Daily Patriot wrote that the tornado “was a huge, cone-shaped, dark-looking mass, several hundred yards in width, and as it sped on its mission of death and destruction" as it approached the town of Marshfield. A resident of Marshfield said that they initially had mistaken the tornado for smoke being emitted from a smokestack and later smoke from a house fire, before realizing that it was a tornado approaching them. The tornado destroyed almost every building it struck, before entering into the city limits of Marshfield. Prior to the tornado hitting Marshfield, several people took shelter in the town's courthouse, which was equipped with an underground storm shelter made of brick. The tornado ripped through the town in less than a minute, destroying almost every building in town. After devastating Marshfield, the tornado moved through areas near Niangua before lifting. The tornado was on the ground for approximately 69 miles (111 km).

Tornado researcher Thomas P. Grazulis assigned the tornado a rating of F4 on the Fujita scale.

== Aftermath ==
The tornado killed 99 people, making it the 16th-deadliest in United States history and one of the deadliest in Missouri history.

== See also ==
- 2011 Joplin tornado, an EF5 tornado in Missouri that killed over 100 people
