= Samuel A. Shelton =

American politician (1858–1948)

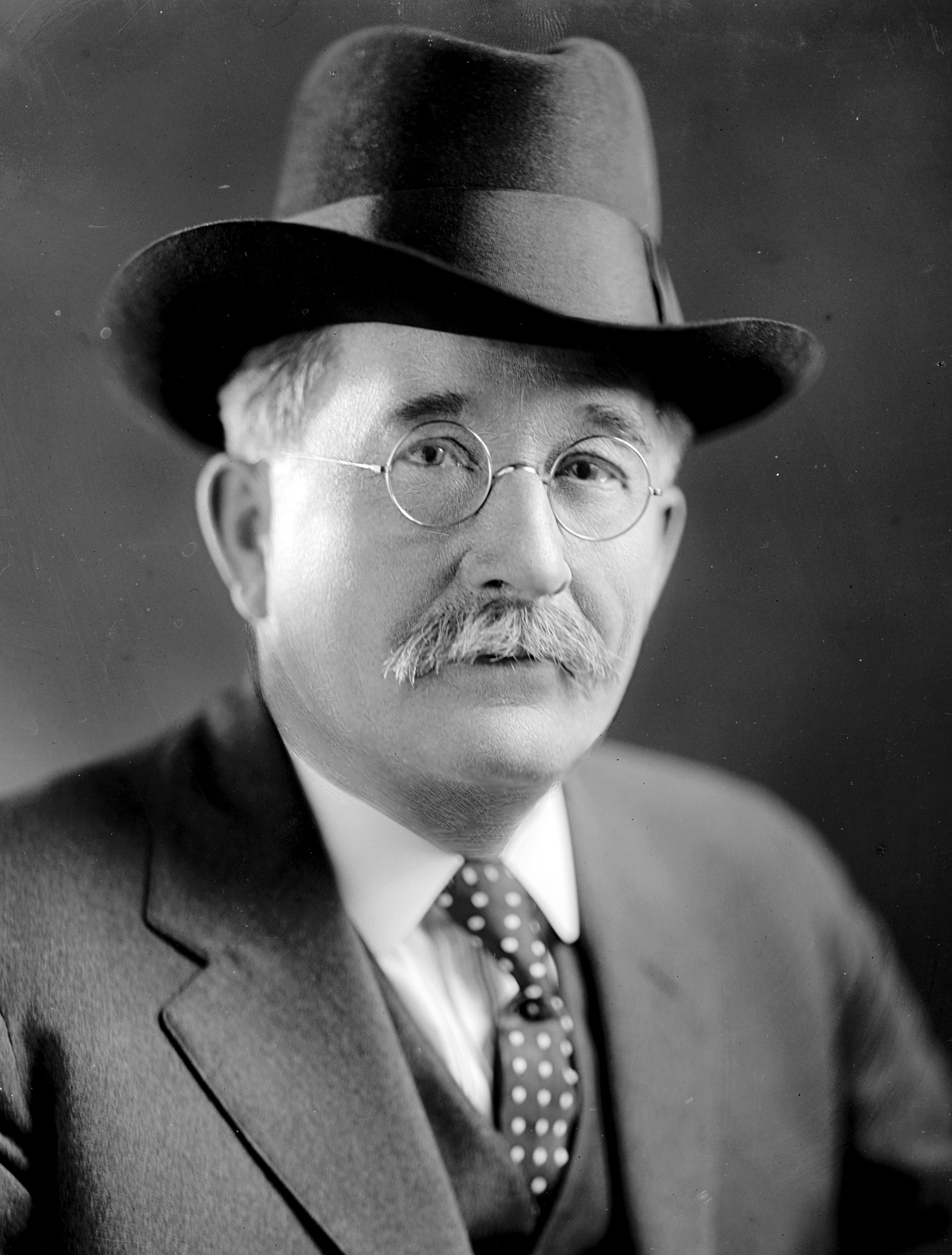
- Portrait of Shelton by Harris & Ewing, between 1905 and 1945

Member of the U.S. House of Representatives from Missouri's 16th district
- In office March 4, 1921 – March 3, 1923
- Preceded by: Thomas L. Rubey
- Succeeded by: Thomas L. Rubey

Personal details
- Born: Samuel Azariah Shelton; September 3, 1858 near Waterloo, Alabama, US
- Died: September 13, 1948 (aged 90) Marshfield, Missouri, US
- Party: Republican
- Relations: John C. Ketcham (son-in-law)
- Children: 6
- Occupation: Politician, lawyer

Samuel Azariah Shelton (September 3, 1858 – September 13, 1948) was an American politician and lawyer. A Republican, he was a member of the United States House of Representatives from Missouri.

== Early life and education ==
Shelton was born on September 3, 1858, near Waterloo, Alabama. In 1869, he and his family moved to High Prairie Township, Webster County, Missouri. He attended common schools in Waldo, then the Mountain Dale Academy, followed by Seymour and Marshfield High Schools. He began attending school at age 29, because he had spent his childhood working on his family farm to feed his family, as his father had died.

== Career ==
For four years, Shelton worked as an educator. Between 1881 and 1930, he operated a dairy farm. He studied law, and in 1901, was admitted to the bar, after which he commenced practice in Marshfield. As a lawyer, he worked in the partnership Shelton & Dysart, in Lancaster.

Shelton was a Republican. He was the Webster County court clerk from 1895 to 1899, postmaster of Marshfield from 1906 to 1910, and Webster County prosecutor from 1914 to 1915. He served four terms as chairman of the county Republican Party committee.

Shelton served in the United States House of Representatives from March 4, 1921, to March 3, 1923, representing Missouri's 16th district. During his tenure, he was a member of the Committees on Education and Workforce, on Expenditures in the War Department, and on Patents. He declined to run in the following election, announcing so on May 19, 1922. He stated that he did so in order to return to practicing law and operating his farm. In a letter to the St. Louis Post-Dispatch, he criticized the way Congress operated, namely its two-year terms and its debates, which hindered progress from being made.

== Personal life and death ==
In 1881, Shelton married Jincie Napier; Together they had six children, including Ada Belle Shelton, who married politician John C. Ketcham. He was a Baptist. As for his personality, a newspaper described him as "a man of vision and foresight" who "knows better than to stick his head against a buzz-saw, or to run up against a stone wall". He died on September 13, 1948, aged 90, in Marshfield, from pneumonia. He was buried on September 14, at Marshfield Cemetery.

U.S. House of Representatives
| Preceded by Thomas L. Rubey | Member of the U.S. House of Representatives from Missouri's 16th congressional district 1921–1923 | Succeeded by Thomas L. Rubey |
