= Zenar, Missouri =

Unincorporated community in Missouri, U.S.

Coordinates: 37°05′42″N 92°58′14″W

Zenar is a community in southwest Webster County in the Ozarks of southwest Missouri. The location is on the southern edge of the Springfield Plateau at an elevation of 1,503 ft (458 m). The townsite is located southwest of Fordland. The community is located just east of Missouri Route U, 2.5 miles south of U.S. Route 60. The headwaters of Pedelo Creek lie just to the west and the Webster-Christian county line is one-half mile to the south. The community of Olga lies approximately three miles to the east.
