= Mountaindale =

Mountain Dale or Mountaindale is the name of several places in the USA:

- Mountain Dale, Missouri
- Mountain Dale, New York
- Mountaindale, Oregon
- Mountaindale, Pennsylvania
