= Pedelo Creek =

Stream in the American state of Missouri

Location
- Country: United States
- State: Missouri
- Region: Webster and Christian counties

Physical characteristics
- Source
  - coordinates: 37°06′47″N 92°58′42″W
- Mouth
  - coordinates: 37°02′50″N 93°03′53″W
  - elevation: 1,181 ft (360 m)

Pedelo Creek is a stream in Webster and Christian counties in the Ozarks of southern Missouri. It is a tributary of Finley Creek. The stream headwaters are in the southwestern corner of Webster County west of the community of Zenar. The stream flows west and then southwest into northern Christian County gaining the waters of Olie Lasley Spring then turns to the south and crosses under Missouri Route U. Its confluence with the Finley about three miles east of Linden.

The Delaware Indians called the stream Pedlow Creek meaning shot pouch.
