= Dallas Township, Webster County, Missouri =

Inactive township in the U.S. state of Missouri

Coordinates: 37.1931°N 92.9472°W

Dallas Township is an inactive township in Webster County, in the U.S. state of Missouri.

Dallas Township was erected in 1855, taking its name from George M. Dallas, 11th Vice President of the United States.
