= Crown, Missouri =

Unincorporated community in Missouri, U.S.

Coordinates: 37°15′52″N 92°57′05″W

Crown is an unincorporated community in Webster County, in the U.S. state of Missouri. Crown is located along Missouri Route KK on the south bank of the James River. Northview is approximately three miles northwest of the site.

== History ==
A post office called Crown was established in 1892, and remained in operation until 1906. The community once had Crown Schoolhouse, now defunct. The school took its name from a nearby country store of the same name.
