= Sampson, Missouri =

Unincorporated community in Missouri, U.S.

Coordinates: 37°26′30″N 92°50′33″W

Sampson is an unincorporated community in northern Webster County, in the U.S. state of Missouri. The site is at the intersection of Missouri Supplemental Routes CC and H, between Niangua and Conway approximately 8 mi (13 km) northeast of Marshfield.

== History ==
A post office called Sampson was established in 1904, and remained in operation until 1935. The community has the name of the local Sampson family.
