= Panther Creek (James River tributary) =

Stream in the U.S. state of Missouri

Panther Creek is a stream in the Webster County, Missouri. It is a tributary of the James River.

The stream source is at 37°09′45″N 92°53′24″W and the confluence with the James River is at 37°13′08″N 93°03′07″W. The headwaters are adjacent to U. S. Route 60 between Fordland and Diggins.

Panther Creek was so named due to reports of panthers in the area.

== See also ==
- List of rivers of Missouri
