= Benton Township, Webster County, Missouri =

Inactive township in the US state of Missouri

Coordinates: 37.1569°N 93.0317°W

Benton Township is an inactive township in Webster County, in the U.S. state of Missouri.

Benton Township was erected in 1855, taking its name from Thomas Hart Benton, a U.S. Senator from Missouri.
