= Panther Valley, Missouri =

Unincorporated community in Missouri, U.S.

Coordinates: 37°11′20″N 93°01′04″W

Panther Valley is an unincorporated community in southwest Webster County, in the Ozarks of southwest Missouri. The community is located on Missouri Route KK and on the south side of Panther Creek. It is approximately four miles northwest of Fordland.

== History ==
A post office called Panther Valley was established in 1856, and remained in operation until 1888. The community was named after the nearby valley of Panther Creek.
