= Col. Thomas C. Love House =

Historic house in Missouri, United States

- U.S. National Register of Historic Places
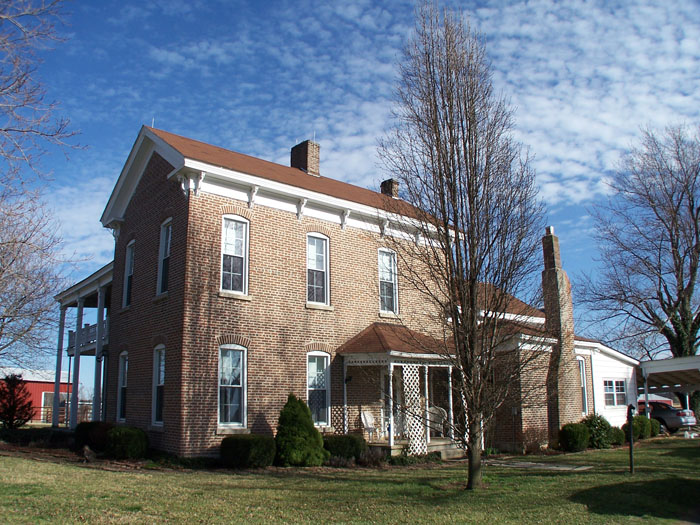

- Location within Missouri Location within the United States
- Location: Off Route 1, near Seymour, Missouri
- Coordinates: 37°11′20″N 92°43′48″W
- Area: 0.6 acres (0.24 ha)
- Built: 1868
- Architectural style: Italianate, Vernacular Italianate
- NRHP reference No.: 85000108
- Added to NRHP: January 18, 1985

The Col. Thomas C. Love House, also known as Love Ridge Fruit Farm, is a historic home located north of the town of Seymour, Webster County, Missouri. It was built after the American Civil War in 1868. The house itself is of Vernacular Italianate design, this type of architectural style, which was popular during the late 1860s to 1870s, is defined by features such as arches above the windows, and porches with several ornamental post that hold up the railing. The house is reminiscent of a plantation type farm house and it was probably Colonel Love's intention to run the farm like a southern plantation. The house has several bed rooms upstairs, including one that probably was the servant's room, that room has a separate staircase that is very narrow. The house has a balcony to the east and the large front porch is two storied. The Love Ridge Farm had one of the largest apple orchards in the State of Missouri in 1904. The Love Ridge farm produced 10-percent of the apples for the State of Missouri in 1904.

It was listed on the National Register of Historic Places in 1985.
