= Panther Valley =

Panther Valley may refer to:

- Panther Valley, New Jersey, a CDP in Allamuchy Township, New Jersey
  - Panther Valley Country Club, a country club in the aforementioned CDP
- Panther Valley, Missouri, an unincorporated community in Webster County, Missouri
- Panther Valley, Pennsylvania, a geographical region in Schuylkill County, Pennsylvania
  - Panther Valley School District the aforementioned region's school district
    - Panther Valley High School the high school of the aforementioned school district
