= Forkners Hill, Missouri =

Unincorporated community in Missouri, U.S.

Coordinates: 37°28′22″N 92°54′33″W

Forkners Hill is an unincorporated community in northern Webster County, in the Ozarks of southern Missouri. The community is situated at the intersection of routes WW and Y, north of the Niangua River, at an elevation of 1250 feet. Conway is four miles to the northeast, in Laclede County.

== History ==
A post office was in operation at Forkners Hill from 1869 until 1906. The community has the name of the local Forkner family.
