= Mountain Dale, Missouri =

Mountain Dale
- Unincorporated community
- Interactive map of Mountain Dale
- Coordinates: 37°11′20″N 92°45′15″W
- Country: United States
- State: Missouri
- County: Webster

Mountain Dale is an unincorporated community in southeastern Webster County, in the U.S. state of Missouri. The community is located on Missouri Route C, approximately 2.5 miles north of Seymour and just south of the James River headwaters. The Mountain Dale cemetery lies about one-quarter mile to the west. Owen Field airstrip and the community of Waldo lie about three-quarters of a mile to the east, along Missouri Route V.

The community took its name from a former school built about 1865. The school was located near a mountain and a dale, hence the name, Mountain Dale.
