= Thomas L. Rubey =

American politician (1862–1928)

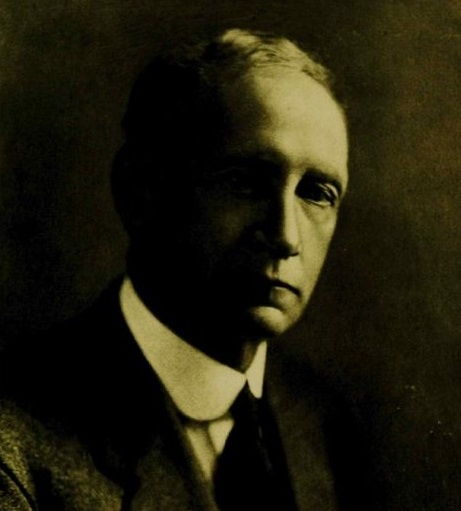

Member of the U.S. House of Representatives from Missouri's 16th district
- In office March 4, 1911 – March 3, 1921
- Preceded by: Rowland L. Johnston
- Succeeded by: Samuel A. Shelton
- In office March 4, 1923 – November 2, 1928
- Preceded by: Samuel A. Shelton
- Succeeded by: Arthur P. Murphy

Personal details
- Born: Thomas Lewis Rubey; September 27, 1862 Lebanon, Missouri, US
- Died: November 2, 1928 (aged 66) Lebanon, Missouri
- Resting place: Lebanon Cemetery
- Party: Democratic
- Education: University of Missouri

Thomas Lewis Rubey (September 27, 1862 – November 2, 1928) was an American educator who served as a U.S. representative from Missouri, serving eight terms (two non-consecutive) from 1911 to 1921 and again from 1923 until his death in 1928.

== Early career ==
Born in Lebanon, Missouri, Rubey attended the common schools. He graduated from the University of Missouri in Columbia, Missouri in 1885 and served as Superintendent of schools of Lebanon from 1886 to 1891.

=== State legislature ===
Rubey served as member of the state House of Representatives in 1891 and 1892, and was a teacher at the Missouri School of Mines from 1891 to 1898, before he moved to La Plata, Missouri in 1898 and organized a bank.

Rubey served in the State Senate from 1901 to 1903 and was elected president of the senate in 1903.

=== Lt. Governor ===
Upon the resignation of Lt. Gov. John A. Lee in that year Rubey became the 25th Lieutenant Governor serving under Alexander Monroe Dockery, serving in that capacity until 1905.

=== Business ===
He returned to Lebanon in 1905 and engaged in banking, serving as president of the State Bank there from 1914 until his death.

== Congress ==
Rubey was elected as a Democrat to the Sixty-second and to the four succeeding Congresses (March 4, 1911 – March 3, 1921). He was an unsuccessful candidate for reelection in 1920 to the Sixty-seventh Congress.

Rubey was elected to the Sixty-eighth, Sixty-ninth, and Seventieth Congresses and served from March 4, 1923, until his death in Lebanon in 1928.

He was interred in Lebanon Cemetery.

== See also ==
- List of members of the United States Congress who died in office (1900–1949)

Party political offices
Preceded by John Adams Lee	Democratic nominee for Lieutenant Governor of Missouri; 1904	Succeeded by William Rock Painter
Political offices
Preceded by John Adams Lee	Lieutenant Governor of Missouri; 1903–1905	Succeeded by John C. McKinley
U.S. House of Representatives
Preceded by Arthur P. Murphy	Member of the U.S. House of Representatives from Missouri's 16th congressional district 1911–1921	Succeeded by Samuel A. Shelton
Preceded by Samuel A. Shelton	Member of the U.S. House of Representatives from Missouri's 16th congressional district 1923–1928	Succeeded by Rowland L. Johnston
