= Missouri's 16th congressional district =

Former U.S. House district

- Obsolete district
- Created: 1900
- Eliminated: 1930
- Years active: 1903-1933

The 16th congressional district of Missouri was a congressional district for the United States House of Representatives in Missouri from 1903 to 1933.

== List of members representing the district ==
Member	Party	Years	Cong ress	Electoral history
District created March 4, 1903
J. Robert Lamar (Houston)	Democratic	March 4, 1903 – March 3, 1905	58th	Elected in 1902. Lost re-election.
Arthur P. Murphy (Rolla)	Republican	March 4, 1905 – March 3, 1907	59th	Elected in 1904. Lost re-election.
J. Robert Lamar (Houston)	Democratic	March 4, 1907 – March 3, 1909	60th	Elected in 1906. Lost re-election.
Arthur P. Murphy (Rolla)	Republican	March 4, 1909 – March 3, 1911	61st	Elected in 1908. Lost re-election.
Thomas L. Rubey (Lebanon)	Democratic	March 4, 1911 – March 3, 1921	62nd 63rd 64th 65th 66th	Elected in 1910. Re-elected in 1912. Re-elected in 1914. Re-elected in 1916. Re-elected in 1918. Lost re-election.
Samuel A. Shelton (Marshfield)	Republican	March 4, 1921 – March 3, 1923	67th	Elected in 1920. Retired.
Thomas L. Rubey (Lebanon)	Democratic	March 4, 1923 – November 2, 1928	68th 69th 70th	Elected in 1922. Re-elected in 1924. Re-elected in 1926. Died.
Vacant		November 2, 1928 – March 3, 1929	70th	
Rowland L. Johnston (Rolla)	Republican	March 4, 1929 – March 3, 1931	71st	Elected in 1928; Lost re-election.
William E. Barton (Houston)	Democratic	March 4, 1931 – March 3, 1933	72nd	Elected in 1930; Redistricted to at-large district and lost renomination.
District eliminated March 4, 1933
