= All, Missouri =

Unincorporated community in Missouri, U.S.

Coordinates: 37°10′50″N 93°02′10″W

All is an unincorporated community in Webster County, in the U.S. state of Missouri.

== History ==
A post office called All was established in 1899, and remained in operation until 1905. According to tradition, the community's name derived from the fact "it's a post office, that's all".
