= Conklin, Missouri =

Unincorporated community in Missouri, US

Coordinates: 37°23′07″N 93°01′09″W

Conklin is an unincorporated community in western Webster County, in the U.S. state of Missouri. Conklin is located on Missouri Route 38, approximately six miles northwest of Marshfield. Elkland lies about four miles north on Route 38.

== History ==
A post office called Conklin was established in 1881, and remained in operation until 1906. The community was named after Roscoe Conkling, a United States Senator from New York.
