= Rowland L. Johnston =

American politician (1872–1939)

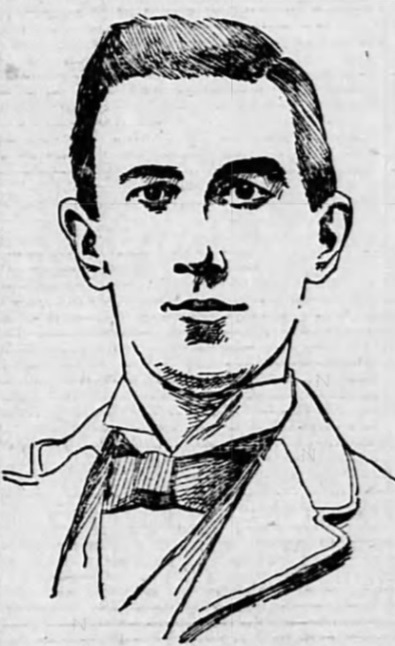
- Sketch of Rowland in the Kansas City Journal, February 22, 1899.

Member of the U.S. House of Representatives from Missouri's 16th district
- In office March 4, 1929 – March 3, 1931
- Preceded by: Thomas L. Rubey
- Succeeded by: William E. Barton

Personal details
- Born: April 23, 1872 Louisiana, Missouri, U.S.
- Died: September 22, 1939 (aged 67) Rolla, Missouri, U.S.
- Party: Republican

Rowland Louis Johnston (April 23, 1872 – September 22, 1939) was a U.S. representative from Missouri's 16th congressional district.

== Biography ==
Born in Louisiana, Missouri on April 23, 1872, Johnston attended the public schools. He studied law. He was admitted to the bar in 1894 and commenced practice in St. Louis, Missouri. He served as a member of the State house of representatives in 1892–1896. He served as prosecuting attorney of St. Louis County in 1904–1908. He served as delegate to the 1908 Republican National Convention. He served as assistant circuit attorney for the city of St. Louis in 1920–1926. He served as a member of the State militia. During the Spanish–American War, he served as a recruiting officer. He moved to Rolla, Missouri, in 1926 and continued the practice of law.

Johnston was elected as a Republican to the Seventy-first Congress (March 4, 1929 – March 3, 1931). He was an unsuccessful candidate for reelection in 1930 to the Seventy-second Congress and for election in 1932 to the Seventy-third Congress. He resumed the practice of law in Rolla, Missouri, until his death there on September 22, 1939. He remains were cremated and the ashes deposited in the mausoleum at Oak Grove Cemetery, St. Louis, Missouri.

U.S. House of Representatives
Preceded by Thomas L. Rubey	Member of the U.S. House of Representatives from Missouri's 16th congressional district 1929–1931	Succeeded by William E. Barton
