= Sarvis Point, Missouri =

Unincorporated community in Missouri, U.S.

Coordinates: 37°06′19″N 92°50′21″W

Sarvis Point is an unincorporated community in southeastern Webster County, in the U.S. state of Missouri. The community was located on the north bank of Finley Creek along County Road 321.

== History ==
A post office called Sarvis Point was established in 1869, and remained in operation until 1909. The community was named for the abundance of sarvisberries near the original town site.
