= January 1993 Tijuana floods =

- Date: January 5, 1993 – January 22, 1993
- Location: California Baja California
- Deaths: 66 total
- Property damage: Significant

In January 1993, a winter storm from the Pacific Ocean hit Baja California in Mexico and other continents of the United States such as California, Arizona and Utah. The winter storm killed around 66 people in Tijuana, making it the deadliest storm in Tijuana history.

== Meteorological history ==
On January 5, 1993, radio, television and local newspapers warned of the arrival of a moderate to strong storm in Tijuana.

== See also ==
- January 2008 North American storm complex
