= William E. Barton =

American politician (1868–1955)

William Edward Barton
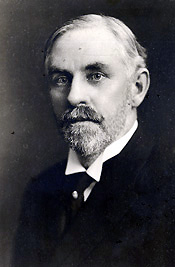
- Born: April 11, 1868; Pickens District
- Died: July 29, 1955 (aged 87)
- Citizenship: Missouri
- Occupation: U.S. Representative

William Edward Barton (April 11, 1868 – July 29, 1955) was a U.S. representative from Missouri, cousin of Courtney Walker Hamlin.

Born in Pickens District (now County), South Carolina, Barton in 1869 moved to Missouri with his parents, who settled in Crawford County, near Bourbon. He attended the public schools and the Steelville Normal and Business Institute, Steelville, Missouri. He was employed as a farm hand, miner, and in a railroad office. He taught school near Bourbon, Missouri from 1889 to 1892.

He graduated from the law department of the University of Missouri in 1894. He was admitted to the bar the same year and commenced practice in Houston, Missouri. He served as delegate to the State judicial conventions in 1896 and 1906.

During the Spanish–American War, he served as a sergeant in Company M, Second Regiment, Missouri Volunteer Infantry. He served as prosecuting attorney of Texas County in 1901 and 1902. He served as judge of the 19th judicial circuit from 1923 until 1928.

Barton was elected as a Democrat to the 72nd Congress (March 4, 1931 – March 4, 1933). He was an unsuccessful candidate for renomination in 1932 to the 73rd Congress.

Barton was again elected judge of the 19th judicial circuit of Missouri and served from 1934 to 1946, after which he resumed a private law practice. He died in Houston, Missouri, July 29, 1955, and was interred in Houston Cemetery.

U.S. House of Representatives
Preceded by Rowland Louis Johnston	Member of the U.S. House of Representatives from Missouri's 16th congressional district 1931–1933	Succeeded by District dissolved
