= Susanna, Missouri =

Unincorporated community in Missouri, U.S.

Coordinates: 37°22′46″N 92°43′50″W

Susanna is an unincorporated community in northeastern Webster County, in the Ozarks of southwest Missouri.

The community is located on Missouri Route M, approximately six miles east of Niangua. Cantrell Creek lies to the east.

== History ==
A post office called Susanna was established in 1892, and remained in operation until 1914. The original owner of the town site gave the community the name of his wife, Susanna Cunningham.
