= Beach, Missouri =

Unincorporated community in Missouri, USA

Coordinates: 37°25′52″N 92°57′33″W

Beach is an unincorporated community in northwestern Webster County, in the U.S. state of Missouri. The community is located on Missouri Route W, approximately six miles north-northwest of Marshfield.

== History ==
Variant names were "Attebury" and "Atteberry". A post office called Beach was established in 1897, the name was changed to Atteberry in 1903, and the post office closed in 1906. The present name of "Beach" was assigned by postal officials.
