= Henderson, Missouri =

Unincorporated community in Missouri, U.S.

Coordinates: 37°08′28″N 93°03′36″W

Henderson is an unincorporated community in Webster County, in the U.S. state of Missouri.

== History ==
Henderson was platted in 1880, and named in honor of "Uncle Sam" Henderson, a pioneer citizen. The Henderson post office closed in 1905.
