= Caddo, Missouri =

Unincorporated community in Missouri, U.S.

Coordinates: 37°20′31″N 93°02′50″W

- Unincorporated community
- Location within Missouri Location within the United States
- Country: United States
- State: Missouri
- County: Webster

Caddo is an unincorporated community in western Webster County, in the U.S. state of Missouri. Caddo is located on Missouri Route J, approximately six miles west of Marshfield. The Pomme de Terre River is just west of the site.

== History ==
A post office called Caddo was established in 1891 and remained in operation until 1906. The community was named after the Caddo Indians, perhaps via another town of the same name in the Southern or Western United States.
