= Waldo, Missouri =

Unincorporated community in Missouri, US

Coordinates: 37°11′21″N 92°44′41″W

Waldo is an unincorporated community in southeastern Webster County, in the U.S. state of Missouri. Waldo is located on Missouri Route V, approximately three miles north of Seymour. The community is near the headwaters of the James River, which is about two miles to the north-northeast. A small airstrip, Owens Field, is located just south of Waldo.

== History ==
A post office called Waldo was established in 1857, and remained in operation until 1886. The name "Waldo" was assigned by postal officials. An early variant name was "Lickskillet".
