= Olga, Missouri =

Unincorporated community in Missouri, U.S.

Coordinates: 37°05′19″N 92°54′25″W

Olga is an unincorporated community in the southwest corner of Webster County, in the Ozarks of southern Missouri. Olga is located on Missouri Route Z, approximately five miles northwest of Dogwood in northwest Douglas County. Finley Creek flows just north of the community.

== History ==
A post office called Olga was established in 1890, and remained in operation until 1901. An early postmaster gave the community the name of his wife, Olga.
