= Diggins, Missouri =

- Village
- Location of Diggins, Missouri
- Coordinates: 37°10′21″N 92°51′16″W
- Country: United States
- State: Missouri
- County: Webster

Area
  - Total: 0.97 sq mi (2.51 km^{2})
  - Land: 0.97 sq mi (2.51 km^{2})
  - Water: 0 sq mi (0.00 km^{2})
- Elevation: 1,654 ft (504 m)

Population (2020)
  - Total: 305
  - Density: 314.8/sq mi (121.55/km^{2})
- Time zone: UTC-6 (Central (CST))
  - Summer (DST): UTC-5 (CDT)
- ZIP code: 65636
- Area code: 417
- FIPS code: 29-19504
- GNIS feature ID: 0716894
- Website: www.digginsmo.gov

Diggins is a village in southeastern Webster County, Missouri, United States. As of the 2020 census, Diggins had a population of 305. It is part of the Springfield, Missouri Metropolitan Statistical Area.

== History ==
Diggins was laid out in 1887, and named after one Mr. Diggins, a railroad official. The site was previously known as Cut Throat, Stella, Centerpoint and Linington. A post office called Diggins has been in operation since 1886.

== Geography ==
Diggins is located on the southeastern edge of the Springfield Plateau in the Ozarks of south central Missouri. The village is located along U.S. Route 60 between Fordland, four miles to the west and Seymour, four miles to the east. The headwaters of the James River are about three miles to the northeast.

According to the United States Census Bureau, the village has a total area of 0.97 square miles (2.51 km^{2}), all land.

== Demographics ==
Historical population
Census	Pop.	Note	%±
1930	133		—
1940	128		−3.8%
1950	126		−1.6%
1960	101		−19.8%
1970	140		38.6%
1980	245		75.0%
1990	258		5.3%
2000	298		15.5%
2010	299		0.3%
2020	305		2.0%
U.S. Decennial Census

=== 2010 census ===
As of the census of 2010, there were 299 people, 118 households, and 92 families living in the village. The population density was 308.2 inhabitants per square mile (119.0/km^{2}). There were 138 housing units at an average density of 142.3 per square mile (54.9/km^{2}). The racial makeup of the village was 97.7% White, 0.3% African American, 0.7% from other races, and 1.3% from two or more races. Hispanic or Latino of any race were 1.0% of the population.

There were 118 households, of which 35.6% had children under the age of 18 living with them, 56.8% were married couples living together, 14.4% had a female householder with no husband present, 6.8% had a male householder with no wife present, and 22.0% were non-families. 19.5% of all households were made up of individuals, and 7.6% had someone living alone who was 65 years of age or older. The average household size was 2.53 and the average family size was 2.76.

The median age in the village was 41.1 years. 26.1% of residents were under the age of 18; 5.4% were between the ages of 18 and 24; 23.5% were from 25 to 44; 34.8% were from 45 to 64; and 10.4% were 65 years of age or older. The gender makeup of the village was 48.2% male and 51.8% female.

=== 2000 census ===
As of the census of 2000, there were 298 people, 115 households, and 87 families living in the village. The population density was 371.0 inhabitants per square mile (143.2/km^{2}). There were 134 housing units at an average density of 166.8 per square mile (64.4/km^{2}). The racial makeup of the village was 94.63% White, 0.67% Native American, and 4.70% from two or more races. Hispanic or Latino of any race were 0.67% of the population.

There were 115 households, out of which 36.5% had children under the age of 18 living with them, 64.3% were married couples living together, 7.0% had a female householder with no husband present, and 23.5% were non-families. 20.0% of all households were made up of individuals, and 7.8% had someone living alone who was 65 years of age or older. The average household size was 2.59 and the average family size was 2.91.

In the village, the population was spread out, with 24.5% under the age of 18, 9.1% from 18 to 24, 35.2% from 25 to 44, 22.5% from 45 to 64, and 8.7% who were 65 years of age or older. The median age was 36 years. For every 100 females, there were 104.1 males. For every 100 females age 18 and over, there were 100.9 males.

The median income for a household in the village was $29,688, and the median income for a family was $33,500. Males had a median income of $27,143 versus $18,500 for females. The per capita income for the village was $15,038. About 8.7% of families and 11.7% of the population were below the poverty line, including 20.0% of those under the age of eighteen and 21.7% of those sixty-five or over.
