= Seymour, Missouri =

City in Webster County, Missouri, United States

- City
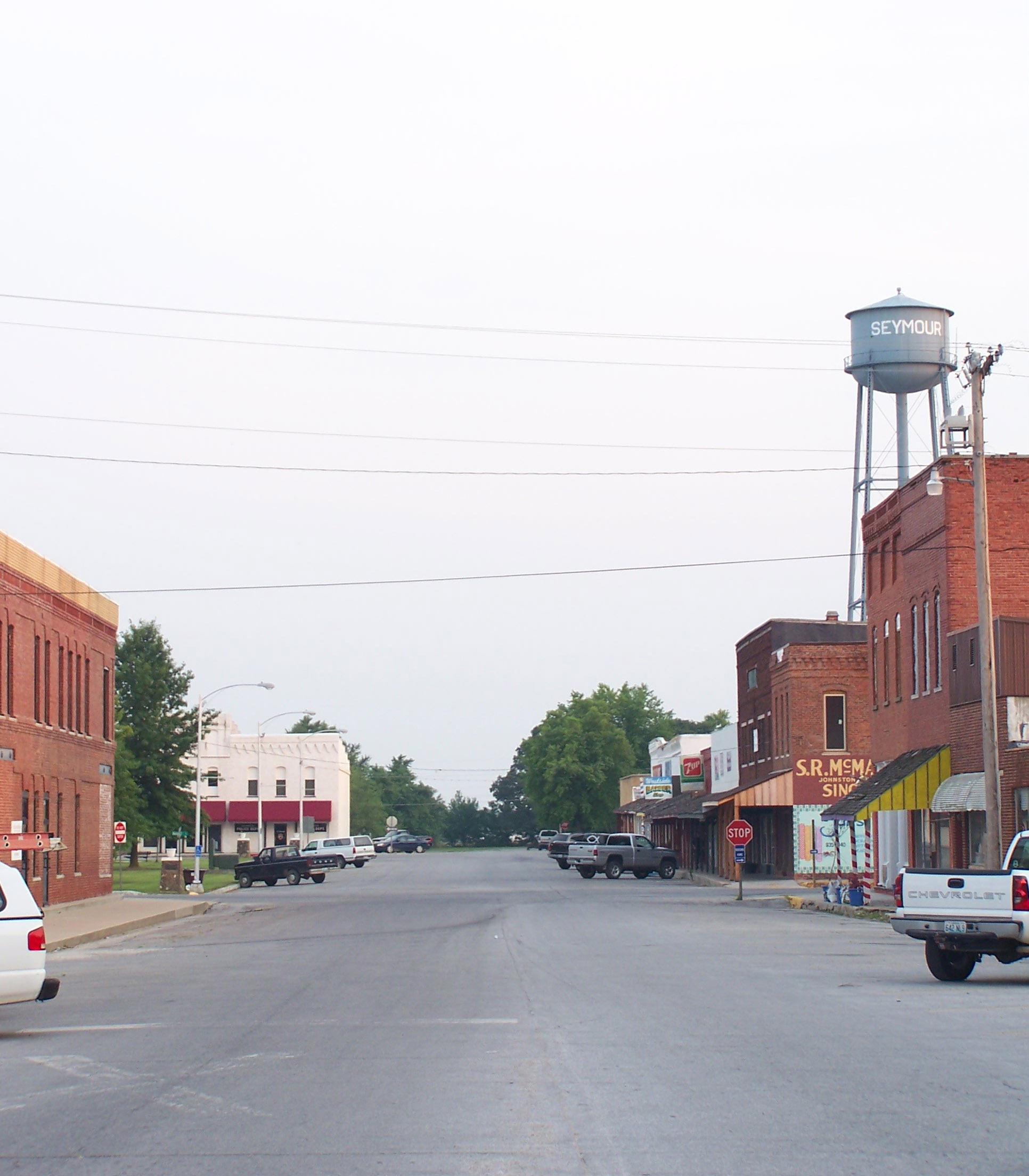
- Seymour Square, looking North, 2006

- Location of Seymour in Webster County and Missouri
- Coordinates: 37°08′47″N 92°46′08″W
- Country: United States
- State: Missouri
- County: Webster
- Incorporated: 1895

Area
  - Total: 3.49 sq mi (9.03 km^{2})
  - Land: 3.48 sq mi (9.02 km^{2})
  - Water: 0 sq mi (0.00 km^{2})
- Elevation: 1,644 ft (501 m)

Population (2020)
  - Total: 1,841
  - Density: 528.4/sq mi (204.01/km^{2})
- Time zone: UTC-6 (Central (CST))
  - Summer (DST): UTC-5 (CST)
- ZIP code: 65746
- Area code: 417
- FIPS code: 29-66800
- Website: www.seymourmissouri.org

Seymour is a city in southeastern Webster County, Missouri, United States. As of the 2020 census, Seymour had a population of 1,841. It is part of the Springfield, Missouri Metropolitan Statistical Area.

== History ==
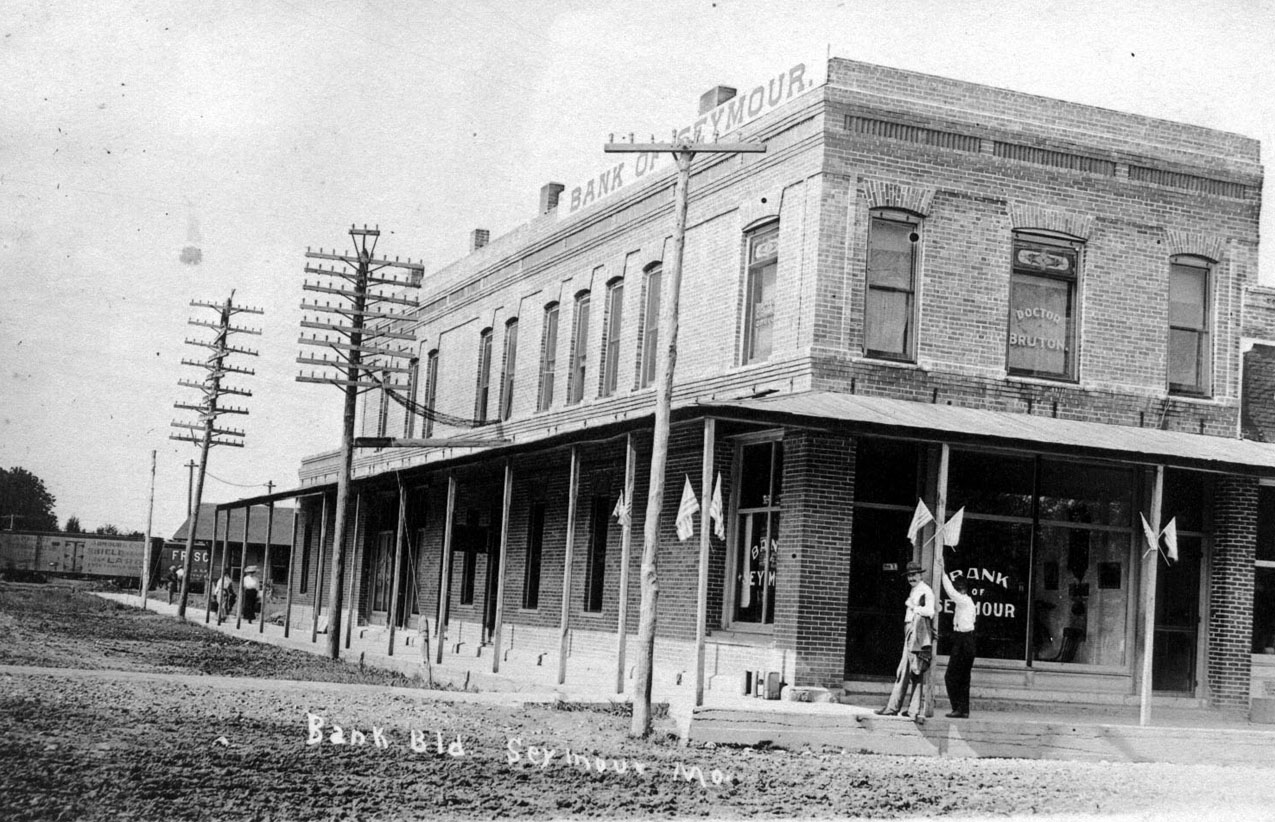
The Bank of Seymour in 1912.

Seymour was laid out in 1882. The town was named by Mr. T.P. Crabbe after Seymour, Indiana. A post office called Seymour has been in operation since 1881.

The Col. Thomas C. Love House was listed on the National Register of Historic Places in 1985.

== Geography ==
Seymour is located on the southeastern edge of the Springfield Plateau in the Ozarks. Streams to the east flow into the Gasconade River, the headwaters of the James River lie to the north and Finley Creek drains the south side of the town. US 60 passes the north side of the town and Missouri routes K, C and BB serve the town. The community of Diggins is 4.5 miles to the west and Mansfield is 10 miles to the east along Route 60. The Burlington Northern Santa Fe railroad's single-tracked Springfield-Memphis line runs through the town just north of the town square.

According to the United States Census Bureau, the city has a total area of 2.76 square miles (7.15 km^{2}), all land.

== Demographics ==
Historical population
Census	Pop.	Note	%±
1890	388		—
1900	527		35.8%
1910	590		12.0%
1920	751		27.3%
1930	681		−9.3%
1940	751		10.3%
1950	1,015		35.2%
1960	1,046		3.1%
1970	1,208		15.5%
1980	1,535		27.1%
1990	1,636		6.6%
2000	1,834		12.1%
2010	1,921		4.7%
2020	1,841		−4.2%
U.S. Decennial Census

=== 2020 census ===
As of the 2020 census, Seymour had a population of 1,841. The median age was 40.3 years. 24.3% of residents were under the age of 18 and 21.1% of residents were 65 years of age or older. For every 100 females there were 93.6 males, and for every 100 females age 18 and over there were 88.8 males age 18 and over.

0.0% of residents lived in urban areas, while 100.0% lived in rural areas.

There were 749 households in Seymour, of which 29.9% had children under the age of 18 living in them. Of all households, 43.9% were married-couple households, 18.7% were households with a male householder and no spouse or partner present, and 31.2% were households with a female householder and no spouse or partner present. About 32.9% of all households were made up of individuals and 18.4% had someone living alone who was 65 years of age or older.

There were 851 housing units, of which 12.0% were vacant. The homeowner vacancy rate was 2.8% and the rental vacancy rate was 7.9%.

Racial composition as of the 2020 census
Race	Number	Percent
White	1,719	93.4%
Black or African American	9	0.5%
American Indian and Alaska Native	7	0.4%
Asian	6	0.3%
Native Hawaiian and Other Pacific Islander	0	0.0%
Some other race	35	1.9%
Two or more races	65	3.5%
Hispanic or Latino (of any race)	61	3.3%

=== 2010 census ===
As of the census of 2010, there were 1,921 people, 746 households, and 510 families residing in the city. The population density was 696.0 inhabitants per square mile (268.7/km^{2}). There were 846 housing units at an average density of 306.5 per square mile (118.3/km^{2}). The racial makeup of the city was 95.5% White, 0.3% African American, 1.0% Native American, 0.3% Asian, 0.1% Pacific Islander, 0.7% from other races, and 2.1% from two or more races. Hispanic or Latino of any race were 2.8% of the population.

There were 746 households, of which 36.5% had children under the age of 18 living with them, 46.9% were married couples living together, 15.1% had a female householder with no husband present, 6.3% had a male householder with no wife present, and 31.6% were non-families. 28.2% of all households were made up of individuals, and 15.2% had someone living alone who was 65 years of age or older. The average household size was 2.52 and the average family size was 3.05.

The median age in the city was 39.2 years. 26.7% of residents were under the age of 18; 8.8% were between the ages of 18 and 24; 20.9% were from 25 to 44; 25.4% were from 45 to 64; and 18.1% were 65 years of age or older. The gender makeup of the city was 48.0% male and 52.0% female.

=== 2000 census ===
As of the census of 2000, there were 1,834 people, 711 households, and 479 families residing in the city. The population density was 699.3 inhabitants per square mile (270.0/km^{2}). There were 792 housing units at an average density of 302.0 per square mile (116.6/km^{2}). The racial makeup of the city was 96.29% White, 0.05% African American, 0.55% Native American, 0.38% Asian, 0.71% from other races, and 2.02% from two or more races. Hispanic or Latino of any race were 1.80% of the population.

There were 711 households, out of which 35.2% had children under the age of 18 living with them, 50.4% were married couples living together, 13.1% had a female householder with no husband present, and 32.5% were non-families. 29.4% of all households were made up of individuals, and 18.6% had someone living alone who was 65 years of age or older. The average household size was 2.50 and the average family size was 3.08.

In the city the population was spread out, with 28.5% under the age of 18, 8.1% from 18 to 24, 26.6% from 25 to 44, 19.2% from 45 to 64, and 17.7% who were 65 years of age or older. The median age was 36 years. For every 100 females, there were 89.5 males. For every 100 females age 18 and over, there were 83.5 males.

The median income for a household in the city was $25,093, and the median income for a family was $30,048. Males had a median income of $23,938 versus $18,481 for females. The per capita income for the city was $12,486. About 13.7% of families and 18.1% of the population were below the poverty line, including 20.3% of those under age 18 and 32.1% of those age 65 or over.

=== Amish community ===
Outside of Seymour is a large Old Order Amish Community. This community of Swiss Amish was founded in 1968 and consisted of 13 church districts in 2014 and a total Amish population of about 2,250 people. By 2019, the settlement had grown to 16 church districts and approximately 3,270 people, placing it among the 12 largest Amish communities in the world.

== Government ==
The City of Seymour has an alderman/administrator government structure. The current mayor of Seymour is Alicia Hagen. The current City Administrator is Hillary Elliott. The chief of Police is Steven Pogue

== Education ==
Public education in Seymour is administered by Seymour R-II School District.

Seymour has a public library, the Seymour Community Library.

== Arts and culture ==
The Seymour Merchants Association holds an annual Apple Festival the second weekend of every September.

The Ozark Mennonite School holds an Apple Butter Day fundraiser event every 3rd Saturday of every October to support the school.

== See also ==
- List of cities in Missouri
