= Northview, Missouri =

Community in Missouri, United States

- Community
- Location of Northview, Missouri Northview, Missouri (the United States)
- Coordinates: 37°17′12″N 92°59′48″W
- Country: U. S. A.
- State: Missouri
- County: Webster County
- Elevation: 440 m (1,444 ft)
- Time zone: UTC-6 (CST)
  - Summer (DST): UTC-5 (CDT)
- GNIS feature ID: 735753

Northview is an unincorporated community in Webster County, Missouri, United States. It is located 6.0 miles (9.7 km) southwest of Marshfield on Missouri Supplemental Route B, 1.1 miles (1.8 km) south of Interstate 44. Northview is part of the Springfield, Missouri Metropolitan Statistical Area.

== History ==
Northview was originally called "Bunker Hill", and was platted under that name in 1870. A post office called Bunker was established in 1873, the name was changed to Northview in 1873, and the post office closed in 1973. The present name is inspired from scenic northerly views from the elevated town site.

== Demographics ==
Historical population
Census	Pop.	Note	%±
1910	78		—
1920	87		11.5%
Missouri Census Data Center

== Notable people ==
The oilman, rancher, and philanthropist Joseph Sterling Bridwell of Wichita Falls, Texas, was born in Northview in 1885. Major League Baseball All-Star outfielder and World Series champion Ival Goodman also was born in Northview.
