= Conway, Missouri =

- City
- City of Conway
- Location of Conway, Missouri
- Coordinates: 37°30′3″N 92°49′34″W
- Country: United States
- State: Missouri
- County: Laclede

Area
  - Total: 1.83 sq mi (4.75 km^{2})
  - Land: 1.82 sq mi (4.72 km^{2})
  - Water: 0.012 sq mi (0.03 km^{2})
- Elevation: 1,342 ft (409 m)

Population (2020)
  - Total: 729
  - Density: 400.0/sq mi (154.44/km^{2})
- Time zone: UTC-6 (Central (CST))
  - Summer (DST): UTC-5 (CDT)
- ZIP code: 65632
- Area code: 417
- FIPS code: 29-16192
- GNIS feature ID: 2393623
- Website: www.conwaymo.com

Conway is a city in Laclede County, Missouri, United States. As of the 2020 census, Conway had a population of 729. Conway is located 15 miles (24 km) southwest of Lebanon.

== History ==
Conway was platted in 1869, and named after a local merchant. A post office has been in operation at Conway since 1871.

== Geography ==
According to the United States Census Bureau, the city has a total area of 1.83 square miles (4.74 km^{2}), of which 1.82 square miles (4.71 km^{2}) is land and 0.01 square miles (0.03 km^{2}) is water.

== Demographics ==
Historical population
Census	Pop.	Note	%±
1890	217		—
1900	272		25.3%
1910	394		44.9%
1920	546		38.6%
1930	576		5.5%
1940	516		−10.4%
1950	514		−0.4%
1960	500		−2.7%
1970	547		9.4%
1980	601		9.9%
1990	629		4.7%
2000	743		18.1%
2010	788		6.1%
2020	729		−7.5%
U.S. Decennial Census

=== 2010 census ===
As of the census of 2010, there were 788 people, 303 households, and 213 families residing in the city. The population density was 433.0 inhabitants per square mile (167.2/km^{2}). There were 362 housing units at an average density of 198.9 per square mile (76.8/km^{2}). The racial makeup of the city was 94.8% White, 0.4% African American, 0.9% Native American, 0.1% Asian, 0.1% Pacific Islander, 1.0% from other races, and 2.7% from two or more races. Hispanic or Latino of any race were 2.8% of the population.

There were 303 households, of which 43.2% had children under the age of 18 living with them, 46.2% were married couples living together, 16.5% had a female householder with no husband present, 7.6% had a male householder with no wife present, and 29.7% were non-families. 25.7% of all households were made up of individuals, and 14.2% had someone living alone who was 65 years of age or older. The average household size was 2.60 and the average family size was 3.08.

The median age in the city was 33.9 years. 30.6% of residents were under the age of 18; 7.9% were between the ages of 18 and 24; 24.7% were from 25 to 44; 21.3% were from 45 to 64; and 15.2% were 65 years of age or older. The gender makeup of the city was 49.6% male and 50.4% female.

=== 2000 census ===
As of the census of 2000, there were 743 people, 310 households, and 202 families residing in the city. The population density was 408.0 inhabitants per square mile (157.5/km^{2}). There were 351 housing units at an average density of 192.8 per square mile (74.4/km^{2}). The racial makeup of the city was 98.52% White, 0.67% Native American, 0.54% from other races, and 0.27% from two or more races. Hispanic or Latino of any race were 2.29% of the population.

There were 310 households, out of which 34.2% had children under the age of 18 living with them, 48.1% were married couples living together, 13.5% had a female householder with no husband present, and 34.8% were non-families. 31.9% of all households were made up of individuals, and 17.1% had someone living alone who was 65 years of age or older. The average household size was 2.40 and the average family size was 3.00.

In the city the population was spread out, with 28.7% under the age of 18, 10.1% from 18 to 24, 26.0% from 25 to 44, 20.5% from 45 to 64, and 14.8% who were 65 years of age or older. The median age was 34 years. For every 100 females, there were 91.0 males. For every 100 females age 18 and over, there were 80.9 males.

The median income for a household in the city was $21,736, and the median income for a family was $30,962. Males had a median income of $25,188 versus $15,769 for females. The per capita income for the city was $11,623. About 12.5% of families and 18.6% of the population were below the poverty line, including 20.6% of those under age 18 and 21.7% of those age 65 or over.

== Culture ==
=== Annual town festival ===
The citizens of Conway hold a community festival each year. This community festival is known as "Conway Community Days" and is held the weekend after Labor Day, in September. The community festival begins on a Friday evening and lasts until the early hours of Sunday morning. Activities include food vendors, dancing, singing, and amusement rides. Local youth, church, and adult organizations participate in a parade.

=== Sports ===
Conway High School's sports teams are known as the Bears. The boys' basketball team finished the 2006–07 season with a 26–3 record, including a 6–0 record in Summit Conference play. In 2008, the baseball team placed third in Missouri's Class 2 state tournament. That year, Dallis Bailey won the Class 2 girls' 800-metre state championship, while Conway's girls' 4 × 800-metre relay team finished seventh at the state meet.

=== Scouting ===
Conway has a long history of Scouting for youth. Cub Scout 'Pack 44', Boy Scout 'Troop 44', BSA Venture 'Crew 44' are an active part of the community. Each of these units are part of the Ozark Trails Council (# 306) of the Boy Scouts of America. Conway also has girls participating in Girl Scouting as part of Girl Scouts of the Missouri Heartland.

=== Youth education ===
Conway is the site for all schools of the Laclede County R-1 school district. The district is the result of various school district consolidations that occurred in the mid 20th century, the most controversial of which was the consolidation with Phillipsburg School District.

== Notable person ==
- Harry Holman, actor who appeared in over 100 films, including It's a Wonderful Life
