= Fordland, Missouri =

- City
- Location of Fordland, Missouri
- Coordinates: 37°09′27″N 92°56′27″W
- Country: United States
- State: Missouri
- County: Webster

Government
  - Type: N/A

Area
  - Total: 1.11 sq mi (2.87 km^{2})
  - Land: 1.10 sq mi (2.86 km^{2})
  - Water: 0 sq mi (0.00 km^{2})
- Elevation: 1,604 ft (489 m)

Population (2020)
  - Total: 778
  - Density: 703.7/sq mi (271.71/km^{2})
- Time zone: UTC-6 (Central (CST))
  - Summer (DST): UTC-5 (CDT)
- ZIP code: 65652
- Area code: 417
- FIPS code: 29-25012
- Website: http://cityoffordland.com/

Fordland is a city in southern Webster County, Missouri, United States. As of the 2020 census, Fordland had a population of 778. It is part of the Springfield, Missouri Metropolitan Statistical Area.

== History ==
Fordland was platted in 1882, with its post office beginning operations in the same year. The community was named for Kansas City, Fort Scott and Memphis Railroad comptroller J. S. Ford.

== Geography ==
Fordland is located on the southeastern edge of the Springfield Plateau in the Ozarks of south central Missouri. The village is located along U.S. Route 60 between Diggins, four miles to the east and Rogersville, 6.5 miles to the southwest.

According to the United States Census Bureau, the city has a total area of 1.11 square miles (2.87 km^{2}), all land.

Due to its higher elevation compared to Springfield, a tower farm for the market's television and FM radio stations is located in Fordland.

== Demographics ==
Historical population
Census	Pop.	Note	%±
1920	248		—
1930	327		31.9%
1940	331		1.2%
1950	302		−8.8%
1960	338		11.9%
1970	399		18.0%
1980	569		42.6%
1990	523		−8.1%
2000	684		30.8%
2010	800		17.0%
2020	778		−2.7%
U.S. Decennial Census

=== 2010 census ===
As of the census of 2010, there were 800 people, 312 households, and 205 families living in the city. The population density was 720.7 inhabitants per square mile (278.3/km^{2}). There were 343 housing units at an average density of 309.0 per square mile (119.3/km^{2}). The racial makeup of the city was 96.3% White, 0.4% African American, 1.0% Native American, 0.1% Asian, 0.5% from other races, and 1.8% from two or more races. Hispanic or Latino of any race were 3.1% of the population.

There were 312 households, of which 37.2% had children under the age of 18 living with them, 43.3% were married couples living together, 17.3% had a female householder with no husband present, 5.1% had a male householder with no wife present, and 34.3% were non-families. 31.7% of all households were made up of individuals, and 12.5% had someone living alone who was 65 years of age or older. The average household size was 2.56 and the average family size was 3.20.

The median age in the city was 34.2 years. 28.6% of residents were under the age of 18; 9.1% were between the ages of 18 and 24; 26.8% were from 25 to 44; 22.6% were from 45 to 64; and 13% were 65 years of age or older. The gender makeup of the city was 47.5% male and 52.5% female.

=== 2000 census ===
As of the census of 2000, there were 684 people, 287 households, and 196 families living in the city. The population density was 771.9 inhabitants per square mile (298.0/km^{2}). There were 326 housing units at an average density of 367.9 per square mile (142.0/km^{2}). The racial makeup of the city was 96.78% White, 0.29% Native American, 0.15% Asian, and 2.78% from two or more races. Hispanic or Latino of any race were 1.61% of the population.

There were 287 households, out of which 32.4% had children under the age of 18 living with them, 51.6% were married couples living together, 13.2% had a female householder with no husband present, and 31.4% were non-families. 27.2% of all households were made up of individuals, and 14.6% had someone living alone who was 65 years of age or older. The average household size was 2.38 and the average family size was 2.87.

In the city the population was spread out, with 25.6% under the age of 18, 8.6% from 18 to 24, 29.8% from 25 to 44, 20.8% from 45 to 64, and 15.2% who were 65 years of age or older. The median age was 34 years. For every 100 females, there were 91.1 males. For every 100 females age 18 and over, there were 87.1 males.

The median income for a household in the city was $3,042, and the median income for a family was $472. Males had a median income of $26,447 versus $2,059 for females. The per capita income for the city was $676. About 4.8% of families and 11.4% of the population were below the poverty line, including 17.4% of those under age 18 and 9.2% of those age 65 or over.

== Education ==
The Fordland R-III School District operates one elementary school, one middle school and Fordland High School.
