= Niangua, Missouri =

- City
- Location of Niangua, Missouri
- Coordinates: 37°23′20″N 92°49′52″W
- Country: United States
- State: Missouri
- County: Webster

Area
  - Total: 0.41 sq mi (1.06 km^{2})
  - Land: 0.41 sq mi (1.06 km^{2})
  - Water: 0 sq mi (0.00 km^{2})
- Elevation: 1,440 ft (439 m)

Population (2020)
  - Total: 390
  - Density: 951.3/sq mi (367.29/km^{2})
- Time zone: UTC-6 (Central (CST))
  - Summer (DST): UTC-5 (CDT)
- ZIP code: 65713
- Area code: 417
- FIPS code: 29-52418
- GNIS feature ID: 0723350

Niangua is a city in Webster County, Missouri, United States. As of the 2020 census, Niangua had a population of 390. Niangua is part of the Springfield, Missouri Metropolitan Statistical Area.

== History ==
The first settlement was made at Niangua prior to the Civil War. A post office called Niangua has been in operation since 1870. The community takes its name from the nearby Niangua River.

== Geography ==
Niangua is located at 37°23′20″N 92°49′52″W (37.388793, -92.831077). According to the United States Census Bureau, the city has a total area of 0.41 square miles (1.06 km^{2}), all land.

Niangua lies three miles from Interstate 44 and five miles north of Marshfield.

== Demographics ==
Historical population
Census	Pop.	Note	%±
1920	283		—
1930	253		−10.6%
1940	293		15.8%
1950	344		17.4%
1960	287		−16.6%
1970	309		7.7%
1980	376		21.7%
1990	459		22.1%
2000	445		−3.1%
2010	405		−9.0%
2020	390		−3.7%
U.S. Decennial Census

=== 2010 census ===
As of the census of 2010, there were 405 people, 174 households, and 113 families living in the city. The population density was 987.8 inhabitants per square mile (381.4/km^{2}). There were 200 housing units at an average density of 487.8 per square mile (188.3/km^{2}). The racial makeup of the city was 97.3% White, 0.5% African American, 1.5% Native American, 0.2% Asian, 0.2% from other races, and 0.2% from two or more races. Hispanic or Latino of any race were 1.7% of the population.

There were 174 households, of which 27.6% had children under the age of 18 living with them, 43.1% were married couples living together, 13.2% had a female householder with no husband present, 8.6% had a male householder with no wife present, and 35.1% were non-families. 29.9% of all households were made up of individuals, and 15.5% had someone living alone who was 65 years of age or older. The average household size was 2.33 and the average family size was 2.77.

The median age in the city was 41.4 years. 23.2% of residents were under the age of 18; 8.6% were between the ages of 18 and 24; 22% were from 25 to 44; 28.6% were from 45 to 64; and 17.5% were 65 years of age or older. The gender makeup of the city was 47.9% male and 52.1% female.

=== 2000 census ===
As of the census of 2000, there were 445 people, 179 households, and 124 families living in the city. The population density was 1,088.6 inhabitants per square mile (420.3/km^{2}). There were 202 housing units at an average density of 494.1 per square mile (190.8/km^{2}). The racial makeup of the city was 96.18% White, 0.45% African American, 2.02% Native American, 0.67% from other races, and 0.67% from two or more races. Hispanic or Latino of any race were 1.35% of the population.

There were 179 households, out of which 31.3% had children under the age of 18 living with them, 55.9% were married couples living together, 11.2% had a female householder with no husband present, and 30.2% were non-families. 27.9% of all households were made up of individuals, and 11.7% had someone living alone who was 65 years of age or older. The average household size was 2.49 and the average family size was 3.04.

In the city the population was spread out, with 26.1% under the age of 18, 8.1% from 18 to 24, 27.0% from 25 to 44, 23.6% from 45 to 64, and 15.3% who were 65 years of age or older. The median age was 38 years. For every 100 females, there were 99.6 males. For every 100 females age 18 and over, there were 103.1 males.

The median income for a household in the city was $26,000, and the median income for a family was $27,500. Males had a median income of $26,000 versus $19,792 for females. The per capita income for the city was $12,509. About 12.5% of families and 16.9% of the population were below the poverty line, including 24.3% of those under age 18 and 17.3% of those age 65 or over.

== Notable people ==
- Roy Blunt (born 1950), politician
