= Webster County, Missouri =

County in Missouri, United States

- County
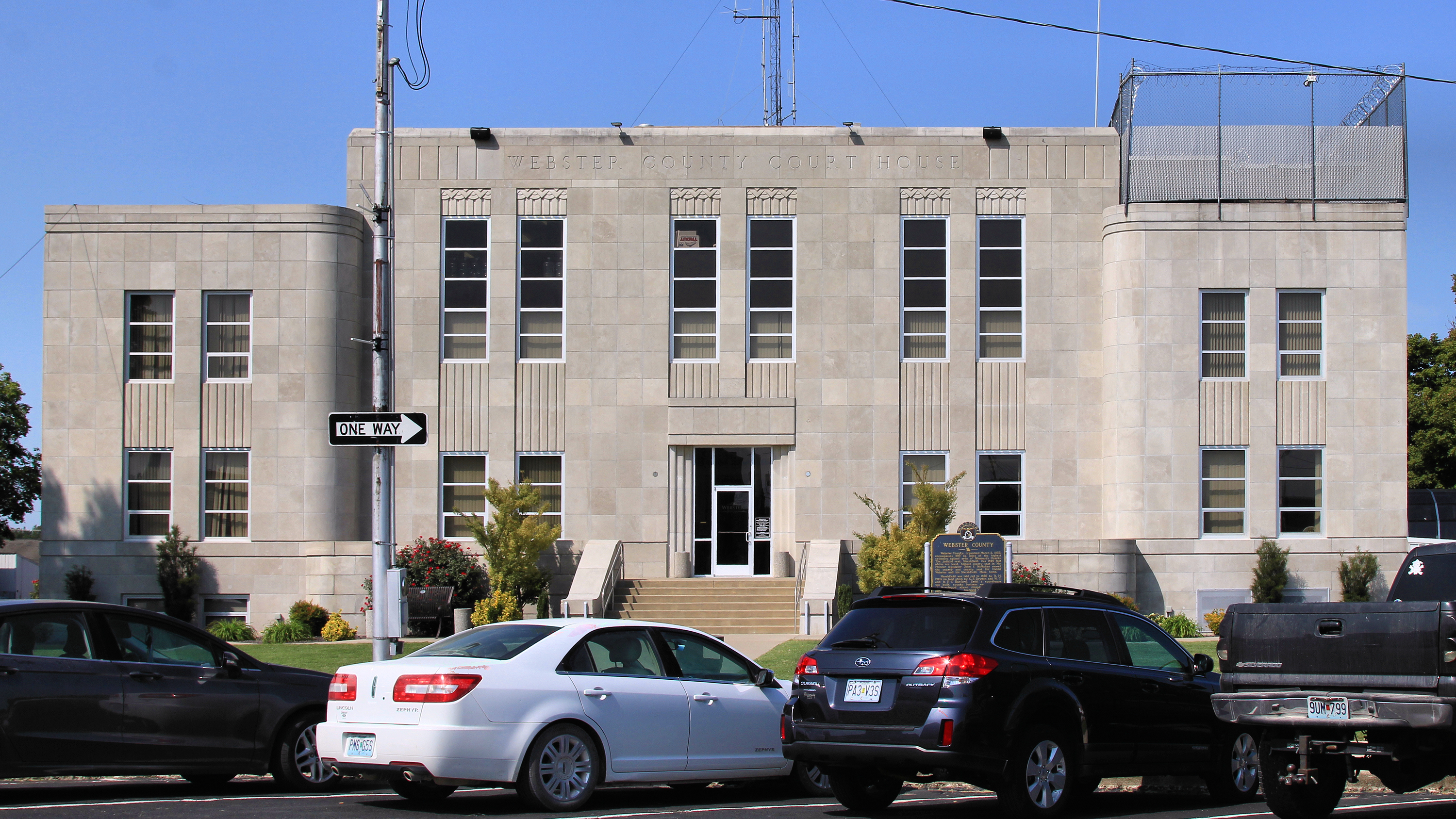
- Webster County Courthouse in Marshfield

- Location within the U.S. state of Missouri
- Coordinates: 37°17′N 92°52′W
- Country: United States
- State: Missouri
- Founded: March 3, 1854
- Named for: Daniel Webster
- Seat: Marshfield
- Largest city: Marshfield

Area
  - Total: 594 sq mi (1,540 km^{2})
  - Land: 593 sq mi (1,540 km^{2})
  - Water: 1.2 sq mi (3.1 km^{2}) 0.2%

Population (2020)
  - Total: 39,085
  - Estimate (2025): 43,054 ▲
  - Density: 72.6/sq mi (28.0/km^{2})
- Time zone: UTC−6 (Central)
  - Summer (DST): UTC−5 (CDT)
- Congressional districts: 4th, 7th
- Website: webstercountymo.gov

Webster County is a county located in the U.S. state of Missouri. As of the 2020 census, the population was 39,085. Its county seat is Marshfield. The county was organized in 1855 and named for U.S. Senator and U.S. Secretary of State Daniel Webster.

Webster County is part of the Springfield, MO Metropolitan Statistical Area.

== History ==
Webster County was organized on March 3, 1855, and encompasses some of the highest extensive upland area of Missouri's Ozarks. The judicial seat is Marshfield, which lies 1,490 feet above sea level. Webster County is the highest county seat in the state of Missouri. Pioneer Legislator John F. McMahan named the county and county seat for Daniel Webster, and his Marshfield, Massachusetts home.

Marshfield was laid out in 1856 by R.H. Pitts, on land that was given by C.F. Dryden and W.T. and B.F.T. Burford. Until a courthouse was built, the county business was conducted at Hazelwood where Joseph W. McClurg, later Governor of Missouri, operated a general store. Today's Carthage Marble courthouse was built in 1939-1941 and is the county's third.

During the U.S. Civil War, a small force of pro-Southern troops was driven out of Marshfield in February 1862, and ten months later a body of Confederates was routed east of town. On January 9, 1863, General Joseph O. Shelby’s troops burned the stoutly built Union fortification at Marshfield and at Sand Springs, evacuated earlier. During Marmaduke's First Raid, on January 9, 1863, Confederate Troops under the command of Col. Joseph C. Porter, led by Lt. Colonel John M. Wimer, burned the Fort at Hazelwood. By 1862, the telegraph line passed near Marshfield on a route later called the "Old Wire Road".

A part of the 1808 Osage Native American land cession, the county was settled in the early 1830s by pioneers from Kentucky and Tennessee. A Native American trail crossed southern Webster County and many prehistoric mounds are in the area.

The railroad-building boom of the post Civil War period stimulated the county's growth as a dairy, poultry, and livestock producer. The Atlantic & Pacific (Frisco) Railroad was built through Marshfield in 1872, and by 1883 the Kansas City, Springfield, and Memphis (Frisco) crossed the county. Seymour, Rogersville, Fordland and Niangua grew up along the railroad routes.

Early schools in the county were Marshfield Academy, chartered in 1860; Mt. Dale Academy, opened in 1873; and Henderson Academy, chartered in 1879.

On April 18, 1880, an intense tornado measuring F4 on the Fujita scale struck Marshfield. Its damage path was 800 yards (730 m) wide and 64 miles (103 km) long. The tornado killed 99 people and injured 100, and it is said that 10% of Marshfield's residents were killed and all but 15 of its buildings were destroyed. The composition “Marshfield Cyclone” by the African-American musician John W. (Blind) Boone gave wide publicity to the cyclone, which is still listed as one of the top ten natural disasters in the history of the nation.

Astronomer Edwin P. Hubble (1889–1953) was born in Marshfield and attended through the third grade in the public school system. A replica of the Hubble telescope sits in the courthouse yard and the Marshfield stretch of I-44 was named in his honor.

Marshfield holds claim to the oldest Independence Day parade west of the Mississippi River. Former President George Herbert Walker Bush and wife Barbara visited the parade on July 4, 1991, while campaigning for the presidency through Missouri. Webster County also boasts the longest continuous county fair in the state of Missouri.

The annual Seymour Apple Festival, established in 1973, has grown to one of Missouri's largest free celebrations, with estimated crowds of more than 30,000 congregating on the Seymour public square each second weekend of September. The festival pays tribute to Seymour's apple industry, which began in the 1840s, with Seymour being called "The Land Of The Big Red Apple" around the turn of the 20th century, when Webster County produced more than 50 percent of the state's apple crop.

== Geography ==
Webster County straddles the drainage divide between the Missouri and White rivers and the headwaters of the James, Niangua, Gasconade, and Pomme de Terre rivers arise in Webster County.

According to the U.S. Census Bureau, the county has a total area of 594 square miles (1,540 km^{2}), of which 593 square miles (1,540 km^{2}) is land and 1.2 square miles (3.1 km^{2}) (0.2%) is water.

=== Adjacent counties ===
- Dallas County (northwest)
- Laclede County (northeast)
- Wright County (east)
- Douglas County (southeast)
- Christian County (southwest)
- Greene County (west)

=== Major highways ===
- Interstate 44
- U.S. Route 60
- Route 38

== Demographics ==
Historical population
Census	Pop.	Note	%±
1860	7,099		—
1870	10,434		47.0%
1880	12,175		16.7%
1890	15,177		24.7%
1900	16,640		9.6%
1910	17,377		4.4%
1920	16,609		−4.4%
1930	16,148		−2.8%
1940	17,226		6.7%
1950	15,072		−12.5%
1960	13,753		−8.8%
1970	15,562		13.2%
1980	20,414		31.2%
1990	23,753		16.4%
2000	31,045		30.7%
2010	36,202		16.6%
2020	39,085		8.0%
2025 (est.)	43,054	▲	10.2%

=== Racial and ethnic composition ===
Webster County, Missouri – Racial and ethnic composition Note: the US Census treats Hispanic/Latino as an ethnic category. This table excludes Latinos from the racial categories and assigns them to a separate category. Hispanics/Latinos may be of any race.
Race / Ethnicity (NH = Non-Hispanic)	Pop 1980	Pop 1990	Pop 2000	Pop 2010	Pop 2020	% 1980	% 1990	% 2000	% 2010	% 2020
White alone (NH)	20,156	23,232	29,607	34,469	35,893	98.74%	97.81%	95.37%	95.21%	91.83%
Black or African American alone (NH)	62	190	358	320	194	0.30%	0.80%	1.15%	0.88%	0.50%
Native American or Alaska Native alone (NH)	72	145	190	221	243	0.35%	0.61%	0.61%	0.61%	0.62%
Asian alone (NH)	15	45	81	70	141	0.07%	0.19%	0.26%	0.19%	0.36%
Native Hawaiian or Pacific Islander alone (NH)	x	x	5	6	9	x	x	0.02%	0.02%	0.02%
Other race alone (NH)	7	1	15	11	86	0.03%	0.00%	0.05%	0.03%	0.22%
Mixed race or Multiracial (NH)	x	x	389	493	1,729	x	x	1.25%	1.36%	4.42%
Hispanic or Latino (any race)	102	140	400	612	790	0.50%	0.59%	1.29%	1.69%	2.02%
Total	20,414	23,753	31,045	36,202	39,085	100.00%	100.00%	100.00%	100.00%	100.00%

=== 2020 census ===
As of the 2020 census, the county had a population of 39,085. The median age was 37.6 years. 27.1% of residents were under the age of 18 and 16.1% of residents were 65 years of age or older. For every 100 females there were 102.7 males, and the ratio among residents 18 and older was 101.1 males per 100 females.

The racial makeup of the county was 92.6% White, 0.5% Black or African American, 0.7% American Indian and Alaska Native, 0.4% Asian, 0.0% Native Hawaiian and Pacific Islander, 0.7% from some other race, and 5.1% from two or more races. Hispanic or Latino residents of any race comprised 2.0% of the population.

19.3% of residents lived in urban areas, while 80.7% lived in rural areas.

There were 14,046 households in the county, of which 34.3% had children under the age of 18 living with them and 20.7% had a female householder with no spouse or partner present. About 23.0% of all households were made up of individuals and 10.3% had someone living alone who was 65 years of age or older.

There were 15,220 housing units, of which 7.7% were vacant. Among occupied housing units, 75.7% were owner-occupied and 24.3% were renter-occupied. The homeowner vacancy rate was 1.4% and the rental vacancy rate was 7.5%.

Racial composition in Webster County
Race	Num.	Perc.
White (NH)	35,893	92%
Black or African American (NH)	194	0.5%
Native American (NH)	243	0.62%
Asian (NH)	141	0.36%
Pacific Islander (NH)	9	0.02%
Other/Mixed (NH)	1,815	4.6%
Hispanic or Latino	790	2%

=== 2000 census ===
As of the 2000 census, there were 31,045 people, 11,073 households, and 8,437 families residing in the county. The population density was 52 inhabitants per square mile (20/km^{2}). There were 12,052 housing units at an average density of 20 units per square mile (7.7/km^{2}). The racial makeup of the county was 96.20% White, 1.16% Black or African American, 0.65% Native American, 0.26% Asian, 0.03% Pacific Islander, 0.31% from other races, and 1.39% from two or more races. Approximately 1.29% of the population were Hispanic or Latino of any race.

There were 11,073 households, out of which 37.90% had children under the age of 18 living with them, 64.00% were married couples living together, 8.30% had a female householder with no husband present, and 23.80% were non-families. 20.40% of all households were made up of individuals, and 9.50% had someone living alone who was 65 years of age or older. The average household size was 2.72 and the average family size was 3.14.

In the county, the population was spread out, with 28.90% under the age of 18, 8.30% from 18 to 24, 29.70% from 25 to 44, 21.70% from 45 to 64, and 11.40% who were 65 years of age or older. The median age was 35 years. For every 100 females, there were 101.40 males. For every 100 females age 18 and over, there were 100.30 males.

The median income for a household in the county was $39,948, and the median income for a family was $46,941. Males had a median income of $28,168 versus $20,768 for females. The per capita income for the county was $17,948. About 9.60% of families and 14.80% of the population were below the poverty line, including 21.00% of those under age 18 and 14.10% of those age 65 or over.

== Politics ==
=== Local ===
Webster County, Missouri

Elected countywide officials
Assessor	Austin Graybill	Republican
Circuit Clerk	Stephanie Vestal	Republican
County Clerk	Stanley D. Whitehurst	Republican
Collector	Kevin Farr	Republican
Commissioner (presiding)	Paul Ipock	Republican
Commissioner (district 1)	Dale Fraker	Republican
Commissioner (district 2)	Randy Owens	Republican
Coroner	Michael Taylor	Republican
Prosecuting Attorney	Ben Berkstresser	Republican
Public Administrator	Danielle Boggs	Republican
Recorder	Stacy Atkison	Republican
Sheriff	Roye Cole	Republican
Surveyor	Gary Drennan	Republican
Treasurer	Todd Hungerford	Republican

The Republican Party predominantly controls politics at the local level in Webster County. Republicans hold all of the elected positions in the county.

=== State ===
Past gubernatorial elections results
Year	Republican	Democratic	Third parties
2024	78.82% 15,493	19.32% 3,798	1.86% 365
2020	78.71% 14,715	19.13% 3,577	2.16% 404
2016	66.52% 11,450	30.07% 5,039	3.41% 572
2012	54.56% 8,406	42.65% 6,570	2.79% 430
2008	46.31% 7,521	51.14% 8,306	2.55% 414
2004	67.61% 10,086	31.18% 4,651	1.21% 181
2000	56.66% 6,721	41.35% 4,904	2.99% 236
1996	54.63% 5,512	41.43% 4,180	3.94% 397

Webster County is split between Missouri's 129th and 141st districts in the Missouri House of Representatives.

- District 129 — John Black (R-Marshfield). Consists of the western part of the county.
- District 141 — Hannah Kelly (R-Mountain Grove). Consists of the eastern part of the county.

All of Webster County is part of Missouri's 20th district in the Missouri Senate and is currently represented by Curtis Trent (R-Greene County).

=== Federal ===
U.S. Senate — Missouri — Webster County (2016)
Party	Candidate	Votes	%	±%
Republican	Roy Blunt	11,450	68.16%	+17.58
Democratic	Jason Kander	4,612	27.45%	−14.13
Libertarian	Jonathan Dine	397	2.36%	−5.48
Green	Johnathan McFarland	150	0.89%	+0.89
Constitution	Fred Ryman	190	1.13%	+1.13

U.S. Senate — Missouri — Webster County (2012)
Party	Candidate	Votes	%	±%
Republican	Todd Akin	7,739	50.58%	
Democratic	Claire McCaskill	6,363	41.58%	
Libertarian	Jonathan Dine	1,200	7.84%	

The northern half of Webster County is included in Missouri's 4th congressional district, which is currently represented by Mark Alford (R-Kansas City) in the U.S. House of Representatives. The southern half of the county is included in the 7th congressional district, which is represented by Eric Burlison (R-Springfield).

U.S. House of Representatives — Missouri's 4th congressional district — Webster County (2016)
Party	Candidate	Votes	%	±%
Republican	Vicky Hartzler	9,821	78.39%	+4.27
Democratic	Gordon Christensen	2,267	18.09%	−0.29
Libertarian	Mark Bliss	441	3.52	−3.98

U.S. House of Representatives — Missouri's 4th congressional district — Webster County (2014)
Party	Candidate	Votes	%	±%
Republican	Vicky Hartzler	5,307	74.12%	+1.98
Democratic	Nate Irvin	1,316	18.38%	−6.18
Libertarian	Herschel L. Young	537	7.50%	+5.08

U.S. House of Representatives — Missouri's 4th congressional district — Webster County (2012)
Party	Candidate	Votes	%	±%
Republican	Vicky Hartzler	8,350	72.14%	
Democratic	Teresa Hensley	2,843	24.56%	
Libertarian	Thomas Holbrook	280	2.42%	
Constitution	Greg Cowan	102	0.88%	

U.S. House of Representatives — Missouri's 7th congressional district — Webster County (2016)
Party	Candidate	Votes	%	±%
Republican	Billy Long	2,778	70.78%	+8.95
Democratic	Genevieve (Gen) Williams	921	23.46%	−4.55
Libertarian	Benjamin T. Brixey	226	5.76%	−4.40

U.S. House of Representatives — Missouri's 7th congressional district — Webster County (2014)
Party	Candidate	Votes	%	±%
Republican	Billy Long	1,150	61.83%	−2.20
Democratic	Jim Evans	521	28.01%	−1.56
Libertarian	Kevin Craig	189	10.16%	+3.76

U.S. House of Representatives — Missouri's 7th congressional district — Webster County (2012)
Party	Candidate	Votes	%	±%
Republican	Billy Long	2,282	64.03%	
Democratic	Jim Evans	1,054	29.57%	
Libertarian	Kevin Craig	228	6.40%	

==== Political culture ====
United States presidential election results for Webster County, Missouri
Year	Republican		Democratic		Third party(ies)	
Year	No.	%	No.	%	No.	%
1888	1,441	47.99%	1,286	42.82%	276	9.19%
1892	1,389	45.38%	1,273	41.59%	399	13.03%
1896	1,666	45.42%	1,985	54.12%	17	0.46%
1900	1,721	48.37%	1,702	47.84%	135	3.79%
1904	1,854	52.91%	1,474	42.07%	176	5.02%
1908	1,901	49.48%	1,761	45.84%	180	4.69%
1912	1,387	35.43%	1,649	42.12%	879	22.45%
1916	2,114	51.35%	1,903	46.22%	100	2.43%
1920	4,000	61.45%	2,428	37.30%	81	1.24%
1924	3,168	51.12%	2,730	44.05%	299	4.82%
1928	4,002	62.99%	2,343	36.88%	8	0.13%
1932	3,083	41.91%	4,211	57.24%	63	0.86%
1936	4,469	55.16%	3,612	44.58%	21	0.26%
1940	4,818	57.69%	3,518	42.12%	16	0.19%
1944	4,281	60.46%	2,785	39.33%	15	0.21%
1948	3,581	51.97%	3,292	47.78%	17	0.25%
1952	4,701	61.73%	2,894	38.00%	20	0.26%
1956	3,940	55.71%	3,132	44.29%	0	0.00%
1960	4,603	62.97%	2,707	37.03%	0	0.00%
1964	3,341	46.63%	3,824	53.37%	0	0.00%
1968	4,118	56.90%	2,547	35.19%	572	7.90%
1972	5,095	68.50%	2,343	31.50%	0	0.00%
1976	3,510	47.98%	3,759	51.39%	46	0.63%
1980	5,121	58.73%	3,409	39.10%	189	2.17%
1984	5,529	64.96%	2,982	35.04%	0	0.00%
1988	5,123	56.70%	3,890	43.05%	22	0.24%
1992	4,361	40.99%	4,149	38.99%	2,130	20.02%
1996	4,958	48.84%	3,855	37.97%	1,339	13.19%
2000	7,350	61.87%	4,174	35.13%	356	3.00%
2004	10,194	68.21%	4,657	31.16%	93	0.62%
2008	10,431	63.77%	5,685	34.76%	240	1.47%
2012	10,708	69.10%	4,409	28.45%	379	2.45%
2016	12,840	76.69%	3,177	18.98%	726	4.34%
2020	14,880	79.24%	3,573	19.03%	326	1.74%
2024	15,984	80.67%	3,653	18.44%	177	0.89%

Like most counties situated in Southwest Missouri, Webster County is a Republican stronghold in presidential elections. In 2020, Donald Trump garnered nearly 80% of the vote, with Joe Biden receiving 19%. Going back in time, George W. Bush carried Webster County in 2000 and 2004 by around two-to-one margins, and like many other rural counties throughout Missouri, Webster County strongly favored John McCain over Barack Obama in 2008. The last Democratic presidential nominee to carry Webster County was Jimmy Carter in 1976.

Like most areas throughout the Bible Belt in Southwest Missouri, voters in Webster County traditionally adhere to socially and culturally conservative principles which tend to strongly influence their Republican leanings. In 2004, Missourians voted on a constitutional amendment to define marriage as the union between a man and a woman—it overwhelmingly passed Webster County with 82.32 percent of the vote. The initiative passed the state with 71 percent of support from voters as Missouri became the first state to ban same-sex marriage. In 2006, Missourians voted on a constitutional amendment to fund and legalize embryonic stem cell research in the state—it failed in Webster County with 57.94 percent voting against the measure. The initiative narrowly passed the state with 51 percent of support from voters as Missouri became one of the first states in the nation to approve embryonic stem cell research. Despite Webster County's longstanding tradition of supporting socially conservative platforms, voters in the county have a penchant for advancing populist causes like increasing the minimum wage. In 2006, Missourians voted on a proposition (Proposition B) to increase the minimum wage in the state to $6.50 an hour—it passed Webster County with 75.50 percent of the vote. The proposition strongly passed every single county in Missouri with 78.99 percent voting in favor as the minimum wage was increased to $6.50 an hour in the state. During the same election, voters in five other states also strongly approved increases in the minimum wage.

=== Missouri presidential preference primaries ===
In 2020, there were: 2,614 votes for Republicans (98% for incumbent President Donald Trump); 1,782 votes for Democrats (scattered among 23 candidates; the top four of which were: Joe Biden, Bernie Sanders, Michael Bloomberg, and Tulsi Gabbard); 8 for the Libertarian Party; 8 for the Constitution Party; and 1 for the Green Party.

In 2016, during an open presidential primary, there were: 1,793 votes for Democrats; 6,878 votes for Republicans; 11 Libertarian votes, and 2 votes for candidates of the Constitution Party. Among a field of Democrats, Bernie Sanders out-paced Hillary Clinton (53% vs. 45%) and others. Among Republicans, Texas Senator Ted Cruz gained more votes (53%) than future president Donald Trump and the other contenders.

In 2012, Rick Santorum received 1,343 votes, more than any other candidate and approximately 63% of Republican votes cast.

In 2008, former Governor Mike Huckabee (R-Arkansas) received more votes, a total of 2,576, than any candidate from either party in Webster County during the presidential primary.

== Education ==
=== Public schools ===
- Fordland R-III School District - Fordland
  - Fordland Elementary School - (K-05)
  - Fordland Middle School - (06-08)
  - Fordland High School - (09-12)
- Logan-Rogersville R-VIII School District - Rogersville
  - Logan-Rogersville Primary School - (PK-01)
  - Logan-Rogersville Elementary School - (02-03)
  - Logan-Rogersville Upper Elementary School - (04-06)
  - Logan-Rogersville Middle School - (07-08)
  - Logan-Rogersville High School - (09-12)
- Marshfield R-I School District - Marshfield
  - Edwin P. Hubble Elementary School - (K-01)
  - Daniel Webster Elementary School - (02-03)
  - Shook Elementary School - (04-05)
  - Marshfield Jr. High School - (06-08)
  - Marshfield High School - (09-12)
- Niangua R-V School District - Niangua
  - Niangua Elementary School - (K-06)
  - Niangua High School - (07-12)
- Seymour R-II School District - Seymour
  - Seymour Elementary School - (PK-05)
  - Seymour Middle School - (06-08)
  - Seymour High School - (09-12)

Also, shared with neighboring counties:

- Conway School (Laclede County R-1 School District)
- Fair Grove School (Greene County R-10 School District)
- Strafford School (Greene County R-6 School District)

=== Private schools ===
- Ozark Mennonite School - Seymour - (01-10) - Mennonite

=== Public libraries ===
- Garst Memorial Library (Marshfield)
- Rogersville Branch Library
- Seymour Public Library

== Communities ==
=== Cities ===
- Fordland
- Marshfield (county seat)
- Niangua
- Rogersville
- Seymour
- Strafford

=== Village ===
- Diggins

=== Unincorporated communities ===
- All
- Beach
- Bracken
- Caddo
- Conklin
- Crown
- Duncan
- Elkland
- Forkners Hill
- Henderson
- High Prairie
- Mountain Dale
- Northview
- Olga
- Panther Valley
- Rader
- Red Top
- Sampson
- Sarvis Point
- Susanna
- Waldo
- Zenar

== See also ==
- National Register of Historic Places listings in Webster County, Missouri
