= Tornado outbreak of June 2, 1998 =

Weather event in the United States

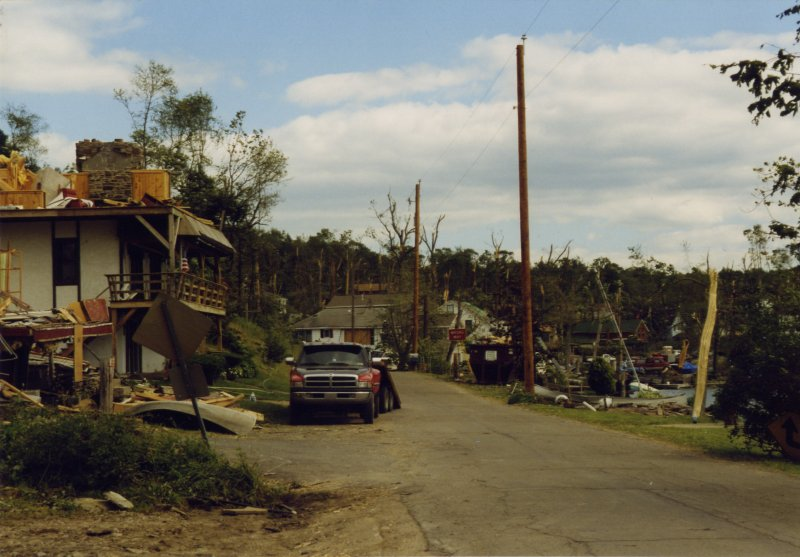
- Damages to structures at Lake Carey, Pennsylvania, on June 2, 1998.

Meteorological history
- Date: June 2, 1998

Tornado outbreak
- Tornadoes: 33
- Max. rating: F4 tornado

Overall effects
- Casualties: 2 fatalities, 77 injuries
- Damage: $42 million (1998 USD)
- Areas affected: Eastern United States
- Part of the tornadoes and tornado outbreaks of 1998

On Tuesday, June 2, 1998, one of the most significant tornado outbreaks in recent history hit the east-central United States. The severe weather event spawned a total of 33 tornadoes in nine states from New York to South Carolina and caused an estimated $40 million in damage, 77 injuries and 2 fatalities. For Pennsylvania in particular, it was the second historic and deadly severe weather outbreak in three days, as it immediately followed the late-May 1998 tornado outbreak and derecho.

== Background ==
On June 2, the Storm Prediction Center outlined a Moderate risk of severe weather across a large portion of the Mid-Atlantic and Northeastern United States regions, allowing a series of shortwave troughs to undercut the vortex across the northern half of the country. Strong southerly flow ahead of a fast-moving cold front contributed to robust moisture return, with dewpoints in excess of 50 °F (10 °C) into central New York, in excess of 60 °F (15 °C) across the Washington metropolitan area, and in excess of 70 °F (20 °C) into the Ohio River Valley. Combined with a very unstable atmosphere, exhibited by convective available potential energy values forecast above 3,000 J/kg, forecasters remarked on the potentially for a classic northwest flow event. Into the afternoon, a main shortwave accompanied by 500 mb winds up to 80 knots (90 mph; 150 km/h) pushed toward Lake Michigan. This feature enhanced a low-level convergence zone and surface barometric pressure falls associated with a lee trough east of the Appalachian Mountains, and generally contributed to widespread favorable wind profiles conducive for supercells. Given forecast storm relative helicity values of 300–600 m2/s2, the possibility of isolated significant, F2 or stronger on the Fujita scale, tornadoes were possible. Storms first developed across portions of Ontario southward into Ohio, and scattered supercells evolved across southern New York, Pennsylvania, the Delmarva region, and North Carolina over subsequent hours as the cold front continued eastward. This activity ultimately weakened as it encountered a loss of daytime heating and moisture closer to the coastline with the Atlantic Ocean.

== Confirmed tornadoes ==
Confirmed tornadoes by Fujita rating
FU	F0	F1	F2	F3	F4	F5	Total
0	12	15	4	1	1	0	33

List of confirmed tornadoes during the tornado outbreak of June 2, 1998 (Note: All dates are based on the local time zone where the tornado touched down; however, all times are in Coordinated Universal Time for consistency.)
F#	Location	County / Parish	State	Start Coord.	Time (UTC)	Path length	Max width	Summary
F1	Smyrna	Rutherford	TN	35.95°N 86.50°W	08:15–08:17	1 mi (1.6 km)	200 yd (180 m)	The tornado destroyed a Grand Slam USA building, which had its metal beams ripped up and slammed back down onto the back of the facility. The wall was blown out of another business as well.
F0	SE of Saluda	Saluda	SC	33.95°N 81.7°W	15:28–15:31	0.3 mi (0.48 km)	40 yd (37 m)	A well-defined convergence pattern was identified in a swath of trees.
F0	S of Gallipolis	Gallia	OH	38.80°N 82.22°W	18:50–18:51	0.3 mi (0.48 km)	40 yd (37 m)	Numerous large trees were downed, which caused damage to about six buildings upon falling.
F1	W of Buffalo	Mason, Putnam	WV	38.60°N 82.10°W	19:15–19:17	1 mi (1.6 km)	40 yd (37 m)	A tornado destroyed a manufactured home and uprooted large trees. A man was injured after being pinned in his van by a fallen tree.
F1	SE of Charleston	Kanawha	WV	38.33°N 81.60°W	19:58–20:00	1.5 mi (2.4 km)	80 yd (73 m)	Trees were downed, some of which caused damage to homes upon falling.
F0	SE of Charleston	Kanawha	WV	38.05°N 81.47°W	20:19	0.5 mi (0.80 km)	60 yd (55 m)	An F0 tornado occurred southeast of Charleston. More substantial damage occurred from a severe hailstorm in the city, which dented hundreds of vehicles and damaged roofs.
F0	S of South River to Core Sound	Carteret	NC	34.93°N 76.58°W	21:15–21:45	17 mi (27 km)	50 yd (46 m)	A long-tracked but weak multi-vortex tornado damaged a few sheds and a boat.
F1	Shippingport to Raccoon Township	Beaver	PA	40.63°N 80.40°W	21:30–21:40	7 mi (11 km)	300 yd (270 m)	A trailer was destroyed and 23 houses sustained minor to moderate damage, mostly to their siding or roofs.
F1	Custer City	McKean	PA	41.9°N 78.67°W	21:45–21:50	8 mi (13 km)	440 yd (400 m)	A tornado caused extensive tree damage along its path, particularly leveling a large area in the Allegheny National Forest. These downed trees caused a majority of the damage to homes, with 7 homes rendered uninhabitable and 31 homes receiving minor damage. An oil museum was destroyed.
F1	NW of Carnegie to SE of Manor	Allegheny, Westmoreland	PA	40.47°N 80.15°W	21:55–22:28	32 mi (51 km)	800 yd (730 m)	A large and long-tracked tornado moved through the southeastern suburbs of Pittsburgh, affecting Mount Washington, Hazelwood, Rankin, Irwin, and Manor. The hardest hit locale was Mount Washington, where over 1,000 structures sustained damage, including roofs blown off and brick walls torn down. To the north of Baldwin, several railroad cars were blown onto their sides along a concrete railroad overpass. Trees were downed as well. Fifty people were injured.
F1	W of Ringgold	Jefferson	PA	41.00°N 79.22°W	22:45–22:50	1.3 mi (2.1 km)	100 yd (91 m)	One barn was destroyed and three others were damaged. Several silos, and the roofs of surrounding homes, were also damaged. The tornado drained the water out of a small pond as it moved over a farm.
F2	Orangeville to Castile	Wyoming	NY	42.75°N 78.25°W	22:45–23:00	15 mi (24 km)	250 yd (230 m)	A strong, multi-vortex tornado destroyed several structures, including barns, several buildings of a fertilizer plant, a modular home, and a hangar harboring three airplanes and a helicopter. Additional houses, garages, sheds, docks, manufactured homes, and larger buildings sustained severe damage. Trees and power lines were snapped or downed.
F1	Donegal	Westmoreland	PA	40.13°N 79.40°W	22:50–23:10	8 mi (13 km)	200 yd (180 m)	A tornado crossed the Pennsylvania Turnpike, overturning a tractor-trailer and injuring the driver. A manufactured home was also overturned. The remainder of structures sustained only minor damage to their shingles and siding, mainly the result of fallen trees.
F2	SE of Markleton to N of Salisbury	Somerset	PA	39.85°N 79.23°W	23:00–23:30	15 mi (24 km)	880 yd (800 m)	An F2 tornado intercepted the path of another tornado occurring just two days prior. A carpentry shop destroyed by that tornado, which was already being rebuilt, once again had its framing demolished. One house had its windows broken. A second house and a barn lost their roofs. A shed was destroyed.
F0	S of Shippingport	Beaver	PA	40.62°N 80.4°W	23:30	0.2 mi (0.32 km)	25 yd (23 m)	Between 50 and 100 cherry trees were toppled, and a house was damaged.
F0	NW of Irvona	Clearfield	PA	40.78°N 78.57°W	23:30–23:32	0.2 mi (0.32 km)	50 yd (46 m)	An F0 tornado damaged trees. It was accompanied by downburst winds that caused additional damage.
F0	Red Lion	York	PA	39.85°N 76.70°W	23:40–23:55	4 mi (6.4 km)	25 yd (23 m)	Crops and trees were damaged.
F1	SSW of Pitcher	Cortland	NY	42.53°N 75.88°W	23:50	0.1 mi (0.16 km)	60 yd (55 m)	A house had its roof almost completely torn off and front porch heavily damaged. Trees were snapped off.
F1	NW of Tyrone	Blair	PA	40.68°N 78.23°W	23:50–23:55	4 mi (6.4 km)	150 yd (140 m)	Significant tree damage occurred.
F1	E of Pitcher	Chenango	NY	42.58°N 75.85°W	23:53–23:57	0.3 mi (0.48 km)	100 yd (91 m)	Hundreds of trees were snapped, sheared off, or uprooted.
F1	Big Savage Mountain	Allegany	MD	39.73°N 78.92°W	23:56–23:58	1 mi (1.6 km)	50 yd (46 m)	Forested areas along the western ridges were damaged.
F0	N of Greenock	Allegheny, Westmoreland	PA	40.32°N 79.8°W	00:20–00:25	1 mi (1.6 km)	50 yd (46 m)	A roof was blown off a structure, and trees were downed.
F0	SE of Cumberland	Allegany	MD	39.62°N 78.73°W	00:21–00:23	0.5 mi (0.80 km)	50 yd (46 m)	Trees were damaged.
F1	E of Fort Ashby	Mineral, Hampshire	WV	39.53°N 78.68°W	00:36–00:46	9 mi (14 km)	150 yd (140 m)	Siding and trim were ripped from homes, a gazebo was destroyed, and several trees were snapped or uprooted.
F4	SE of Indian Head, PA to Frostburg, MD to N of Cresaptown, MD	Fayette (PA), Somerset (PA), Garrett (MD), Allegany (MD)	PA, MD	39.98°N 79.35°W	01:00–01:50	36.8 mi (59.2 km)	1,760 yd (1,610 m)	See section on this tornado – Five people were injured.
F1	Auburn Township to Springville Township	Susquehanna	PA	41.68°N 76.03°W	01:05–01:15	12 mi (19 km)	100 yd (91 m)	Two manufactured homes were demolished, the roof was ripped off a small brick storage building, and trees were snapped or uprooted.
F2	SW of Gibbon Glade, PA to SW of Friendsville, MD	Fayette (PA), Preston (WV), Garrett (MD)	PA, WV, MD	39.75°N 79.65°W	01:35–02:00	12 mi (19 km)	300 yd (270 m)	A strong tri-state tornado completely destroyed two manufactured homes and a dairy barn. At least 21 other structures were heavily damaged with their roofs partially or completely ripped off. Several cows were killed, including one that was tossed over 100 yards (91 m). A wide swath of trees were sheared or uprooted.
F0	NW of Bald Eagle	Centre	PA	40.9°N 78.23°W	01:35–01:40	0.5 mi (0.80 km)	67 yd (61 m)	A number of large walnut trees were toppled, and a telephone pole was snapped.
F1	Shamokin to Kulpmont to Locust Gap	Northumberland	PA	40.78°N 76.57°W	01:40–01:55	15 mi (24 km)	440 yd (400 m)	Over 100 homes sustained minor damage, part of a barn was destroyed, and numerous trees were leveled.
F3	Terry Township to North Abington Township	Bradford, Wyoming, Lackawanna	PA	41.67°N 76.28°W	01:45–02:50	35 mi (56 km)	500 yd (460 m)	2 deaths – See section on this tornado – There were 15 injuries.
F0	Berryville	Clarke	VA	39.15°N 77.97°W	01:50–01:52	0.5 mi (0.80 km)	50 yd (46 m)	Several trees were uprooted, and a barn had its roof ripped off.
F0	SE of Bluemont	Loudoun	VA	39.08°N 77.78°W	02:10–02:14	1 mi (1.6 km)	50 yd (46 m)	Trees were damaged.
F2	SW of Keyser to S of Junction	Mineral, Hampshire	WV	39.38°N 79.05°W	02:33–02:51	15 mi (24 km)	150 yd (140 m)	A garage and a barn were destroyed, while outbuildings sustained extensive damage. One manufactured home was destroyed and several others were damaged or rolled. Five people were injured in one home. Permanent houses and other buildings sustained generally minor damage. A station wagon was turned around, a car was blown over, and numerous trees were snapped or uprooted, some of which caused additional damage to structures.

=== Frostburg, Maryland ===
Frostburg, Maryland
Meteorological history
- Formed: June 2, 1998, 9:00 p.m. EST (UTC−05:00)
- Dissipated: June 2, 1998, 9:50 p.m. EST (UTC−05:00)
- Duration: 50 minutes

F4 tornado
- on the Fujita scale
- Highest winds: 210 mph (340 km/h)

Overall effects
- Fatalities: 0
- Injuries: 5
- Damage: $5.51 million

The most significant tornado of the outbreak was a violent F4 tornado that tracked across Pennsylvania and Maryland during the evening of June 2. The parent supercell responsible for the tornado persisted for over 200 miles (320 km). The tornado first touched down at 9:00 p.m. EDT (01:00 UTC) in extreme eastern Fayette County, Pennsylvania, where it only sheared or uprooted trees. The tornado crossed into Somerset County, where it rapidly grew to a maximum width of 1,760 yards (1,610 m) and intensified to F3 strength. Though the tornado moved across generally rural areas, it still encountered many farms which were completely demolished. A manufactured home was blown off its foundation. In conjunction with other tornadoes in the county that afternoon, about 30 to 40 properties sustained some form of damage. Over 100 heads of cattle were killed in one destroyed barn alone, and many other farms suffered the loss of dozens of livestock too. The tornado crossed into Garrett County, Maryland, now at F2 strength. It destroyed several buildings as it moved through the town of Finzel, including a small house and a cinder-block garage. As the tornado crossed into Allegany County, it acquired multiple-vortex characteristics and reached violent F4 intensity with winds up to 210 miles per hour (340 km/h), the highest on record in Maryland. It descended Big Savage Mountain and entered Frostburg. In this area, at least eight homes were destroyed, including a two-story house that was obliterated. Dozens of other houses were damaged. An equal number of cars were damaged, some of which were totaled. Structures in this area were particularly susceptible to the tornado, as Frostburg resides on the Allegheny Plateau at an elevation around 2,000 ft (610 m) and thus faced full exposure to tornadic winds. Additional damage was incurred to structures in Eckhart Mines and Clarysville before the tornado crossed Dans Mountain. It continued north of Cresaptown before lifting. In total, the tornado was on the ground for 36.8 miles (59.2 km) and 50 minutes. Approximately 29 houses were destroyed and another 125 were damaged along the tornado's path, and about half of the homes remaining nevertheless suffered moderate to major damage. Thousands of trees were snapped or uprooted. Debris from the Frostburg area was carried upwards of 100 miles (160 km) downstream toward Sterling, Virginia. Initial monetary cost from the tornado ranged from $4.5–5 million (1998 USD). Five people were injured. It is one of three violent F4 tornadoes on record in Maryland, with the other two occurring in 1926 and 2002.

=== Lake Carey, Pennsylvania ===
Lake Carey, Pennsylvania
Meteorological history
- Formed: June 2, 1998, 9:45 p.m. EST (UTC−05:00)
- Dissipated: June 2, 1998, 10:50 p.m. EST (UTC−05:00)
- Duration: 1 hour, 5 minutes

F3 tornado
- on the Fujita scale

Overall effects
- Fatalities: 2
- Injuries: 15
- Damage: $2.9 million

A tornado first began over the southeastern portions of Bradford County, Pennsylvania, in Terry Township. It displaced a manufactured home off its foundation by about 8 feet (2.4 m) and inflicted significant damage to its front side. An adjacent farm vehicle, pickup truck, and storage shed stopped the structure from rolling down a nearby steep hill. A storage building was severely damaged near this location, with its roof completely ripped off and some of its metal beams removed from the siding. The tornadic funnel ascended to the tree top level for a time but descended once more as it flattened a large barn. Roofing material from the barn was thrown up to 300 yards (270 m) downstream. A newly built home with a large rear deck suffered only minor damage in this vicinity. The tornado continued into Wyoming County and affected structures along a small hill, causing minor damage to their siding and roofs. As it crossed Lake Carey and impacted surrounding structures, it reached F3 intensity. Every structure along a narrow strip of land across Lake Carey was either severely damaged or completely flattened. At one house, an elderly woman and her grandson were sucked out of their second story home, resulting in their deaths. The tornado continued up another hill east of the lake and continued to inflict significant damage to homes. One of the houses was reduced to its bare foundation and a portion of its back wall In total, 42 homes around this area were significantly damaged or demolished. Over a dozen small and anchored boats were tossed out of the water and onto the shoreline. The tornado continued into East Lemon Township, heavily damaged three houses. One of the houses had its roof ripped off and its garage destroyed, while a second had its back deck destroyed and all of its back windows blown out. One injury occurred in the township. The tornado moved into Lackawanna County, where it struck the campus of Keystone Junior College, blowing out windows and twisting gutters. After 35 miles (56 km), the tornado finally lifted in North Abington Township.

== See also ==
- List of North American tornadoes and tornado outbreaks
- Late-May 1998 tornado outbreak and derecho
- 1944 Appalachians tornado outbreak
- 1991 West Virginia derecho
- 2001 Maryland, Virginia, and Washington, D.C. tornado outbreak
- June 2012 North American derecho
- Tornado outbreak of April 1-3, 2024
