= Tornado outbreak and derecho of April 1–3, 2024 =

Tornadoes and storms in the United States

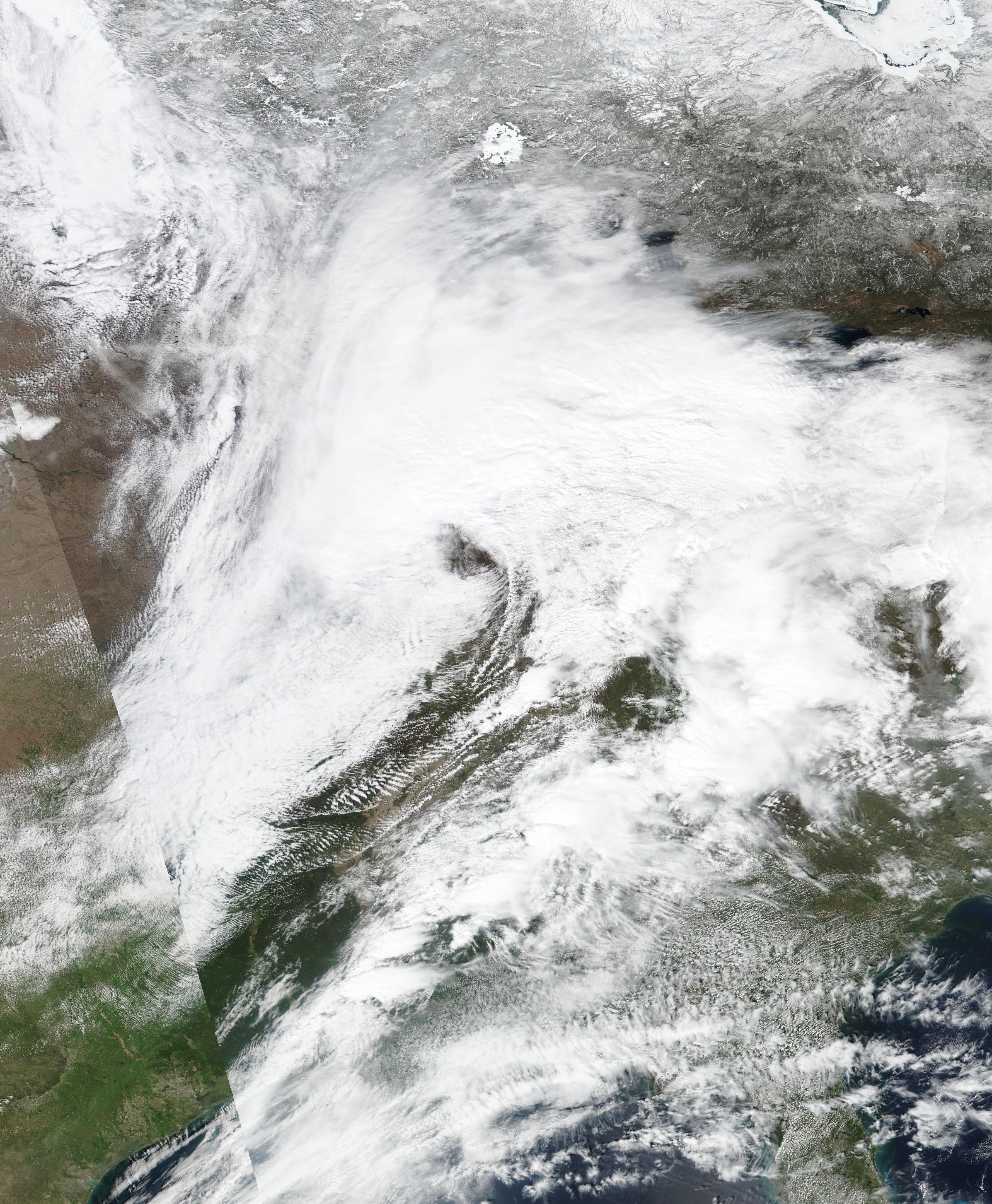
- Satellite image of the storm system responsible for the tornado outbreak and derecho that occurred on April 1–3, 2024.

Meteorological history
- Duration: April 1–3, 2024

Tornado outbreak
- Tornadoes: 87
- Max. rating: EF2 tornado

Overall effects
- Fatalities: 0 (+5 non-tornadic)
- Injuries: 25
- Damage: $1.8 billion (2024 USD)
- Areas affected: Midwestern, Southern, Northeastern United States
- Power outages: 700,000
- Part of the Tornadoes of 2024

A significant tornado outbreak, along with a derecho, affected much of the Midwestern and Southeastern United States from April 1 to 3, 2024. The National Weather Service issued dozens of severe thunderstorm and tornado warnings across those regions during the event. The outbreak first began over portions of the Great Plains and Midwest on April 1, with widespread large hail and damaging winds and a few tornadoes being reported. The outbreak then spread to the Midwest and Ohio Valley on April 2, where the derecho occurred. This was followed by supercell development later in the afternoon. Severe storms also affected parts of the Mid-Atlantic on April 3 as well. A total of 32 million people were estimated to be under watches or warnings, and over 700,000 people were estimated to be without power. Twenty-five people were injured; and five people were killed, all of them by non-tornadic events; three of which happened when downed trees fell onto vehicles in Pennsylvania and New York. The storm system was also responsible for causing flooding in parts of the Northeast, and heavy snow over parts of the Midwest and Northern New England.

The Storm Prediction Center first outlined on April 1 an enhanced risk in areas from north Texas to eastern Illinois, encompassing much of the central United States. In the afternoon hours of the same day, supercell thunderstorms began to develop across northern Texas, moving northeastward and producing large hail. As the event progressed, many tornadic supercells produced brief and weak tornadoes along with high wind gusts; a gust of 90 mph (140 km/h) was recorded in West Virginia, classifying the squall line as a derecho.

The National Weather Service declared the tornado outbreak "historic", stating that not only did it set a daily record for West Virginia, but also broke the yearly record, in one day. Ten tornadoes occurred in West Virginia; which also set a state record for the most tornadoes confirmed in a single day. The previous record was seven; set on both April 4, 1974 and June 2, 1998.

The outbreak was the largest of 2024 prior to the tornado outbreak of April 25–28. In all, 86 tornadoes touched down in total, the highest of which were 14 EF2-rated tornadoes confirmed during the event.

== Meteorological history ==
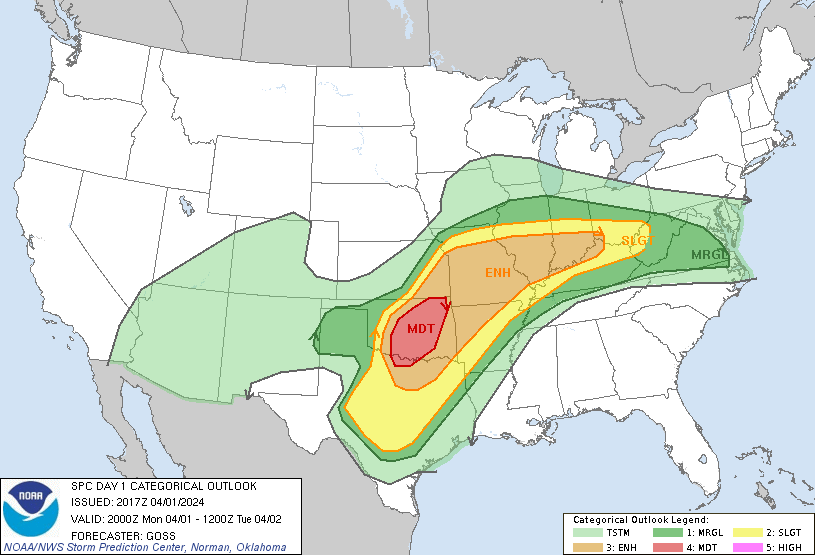
SPC day 1 convective outlook for April 1, 2024, at 20Z

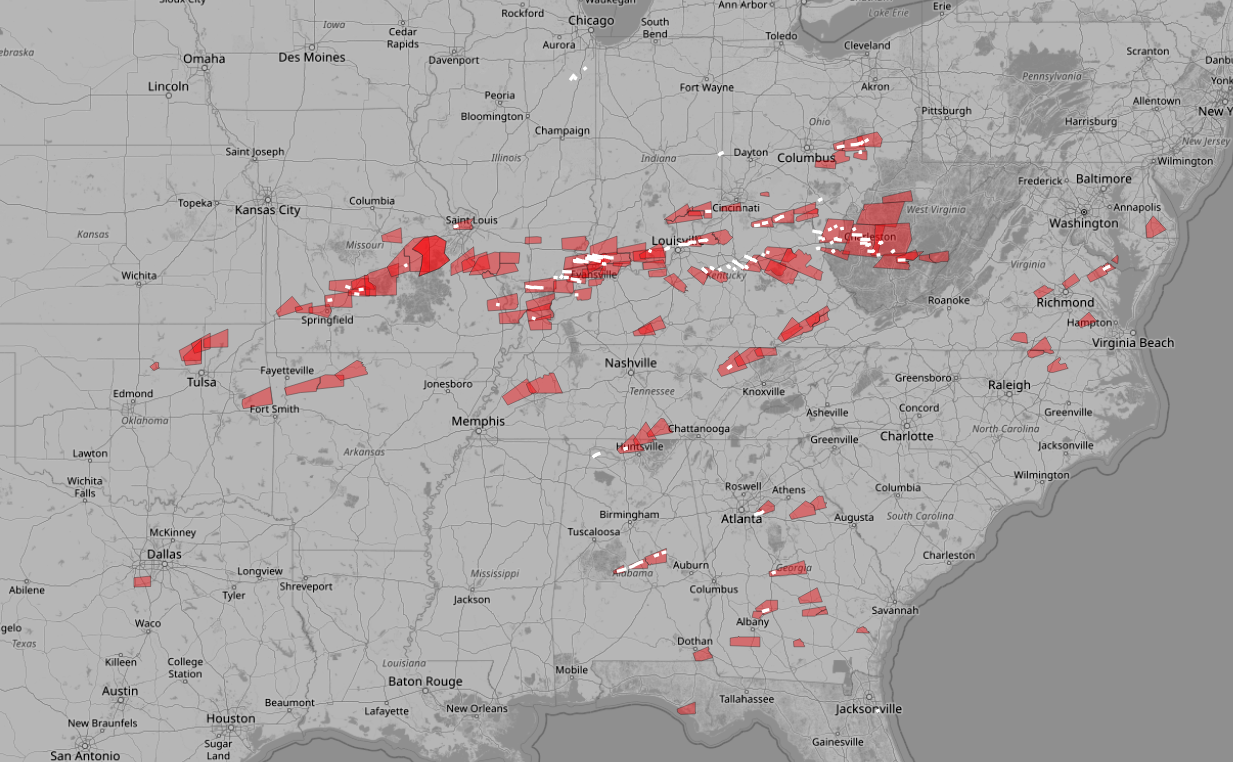
Map of confirmed tornadoes during the outbreak (indicated in white) and tornado warnings issued during the outbreak (indicated in red).

On March 28, the Storm Prediction Center (SPC) first delineated a risk of organized severe weather across the Central and Southern Plains, as well as the Mississippi and Ohio River valleys for the beginning of April. By the morning of April 1, a broad Enhanced Risk spanned from north-central Texas northeastward toward the Illinois–Indiana border, where widespread supercell thunderstorms were anticipated. The impetus for the severe weather setup came as a large, positively tilted upper-level trough progressed eastward from the Southwestern United States into the Central Plains region. Morning surface observations revealed an area of low pressure over central Kansas, supporting a north-moving warm front to the east into Ohio and a trailing cold front southwestward into Oklahoma and the Texas Panhandle. Meanwhile, an eastward-shifting dry line resided from the Texas Panhandle southward into northern Mexico. Within the warm sector of this low, an unstable environment was expected to develop, with averaged instability values of 2,000–3,000 J/kg, dewpoints in the mid- to upper-60s °F, very strong wind shear throughout the atmosphere, and rapidly cooling temperatures with height. Given these conditions, the SPC upgraded much of the eastern half of Oklahoma and a small section of northern Texas to a Moderate Risk. In this area, the capping inversion aloft was expected to erode throughout the afternoon, giving way to multiple supercells capable of producing large hail in excess of 3 in (7.6 cm). A conditional threat of strong/EF2+ tornadoes was also noted as wind shear close to the surface strengthened with time.

Through the afternoon hours, semi-discrete supercells developed across north and central Texas, contributing to widespread reports of large hail the size of baseballs, in addition to hurricane-force wind gusts upwards of 90 mph (140 km/h). Further to the northeast, isolated severe weather occurred in Oklahoma, though it was curtailed by persistent cloud cover and a broad rain shield across the risk area. Even farther to the northeast, training supercell thunderstorms tracked across the St. Louis metropolitan area, producing large hail. By the evening hours, a quasi-linear convective system developed across eastern Oklahoma and progressed toward Missouri and Illinois. In spite of modest instability, strong vertical wind shear maintained organized convective activity as it spread eastward from southern Illinois and eventually into West Virginia during the pre-dawn and early morning hours.

Numerous reports of damaging winds were received, including gusts in excess of 90 mph (140 km/h) near Huntington, West Virginia. The squall line posthumously met the criteria of a derecho, and post-storm surveys revealed dozens of tornadoes along its track. In particular, 10 tornadoes were confirmed across West Virginia on April 2, the most observed in a single calendar day on record. Convective activity finally lost vigor as it moved toward the West Virginia–Virginia border into a more stable environment.

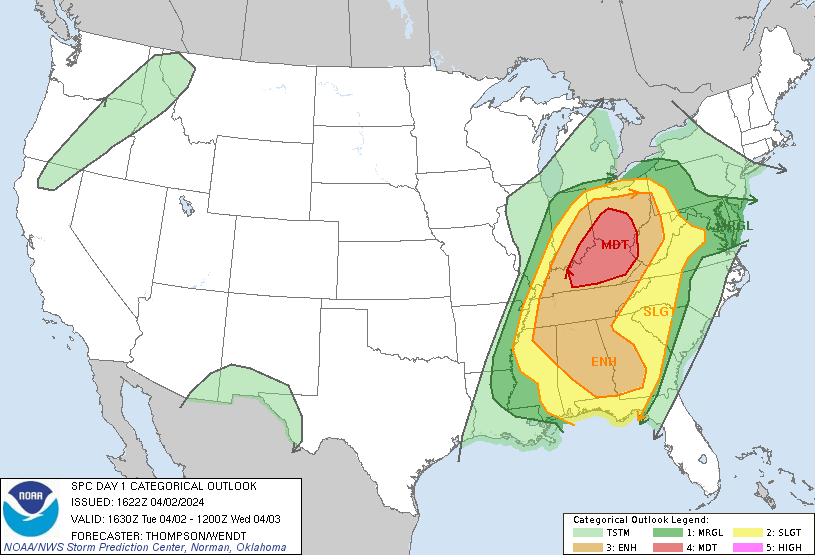
SPC day 1 convective outlook for April 2, 2024

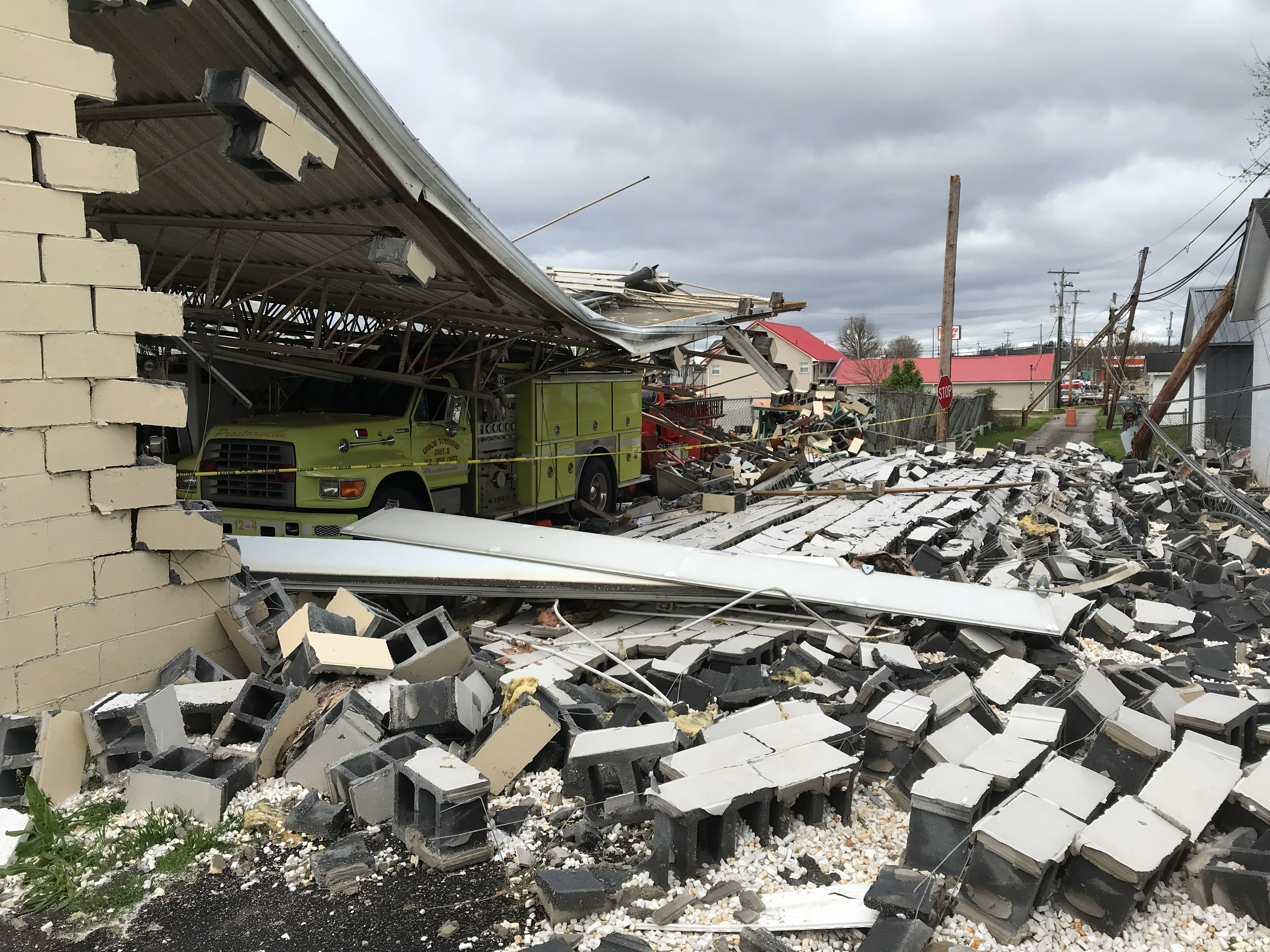
Photo by the National Weather Service of damage to a fire department from a microburst on April 2.

As the derecho tracked from Missouri to West Virginia early on April 2, another widespread outbreak of severe weather and tornadoes was expected to occur across the broader Ohio River Valley region. On April 1, the SPC issued a Moderate risk across much of Ohio and adjacent portions of surrounding states, that outlook was valid for April 2. Despite questions about the influence of widespread morning thunderstorms, forecasters felt there was sufficient confidence that the atmosphere would recover over subsequent hours, contributing to discrete or clusters of storms capable of producing damaging winds, large hail, and multiple significant tornadoes.

By the afternoon hours of April 2, forecasters expressed concern that morning convection would stunt the degree of destabilization across portions of the risk area, particularly in Ohio. Farther to the west, an environment characterized by surface temperatures of in the low- to mid-70s °F, dewpoints between 65–70 °F (18–21 °C), and strong vertical wind shear was still expected to promote a substantiative risk for strong tornadoes. Storms across southern Indiana and western Kentucky initially struggled to intensify during the afternoon, but they eventually matured into tornado-producing supercells as they continued eastward into western Ohio. As convective activity to the north continued eastward into a drier and more stable environment, a cluster of storms developed farther south across Alabama and Georgia, which contributed to additional tornadoes. Additional severe weather occurred along frontal boundaries across several states from Florida to Virginia on April 3 before activity behind offshore.

== Confirmed tornadoes ==
Confirmed tornadoes by Enhanced Fujita rating
EFU	EF0	EF1	EF2	EF3	EF4	EF5	Total
1	19	52	14	0	0	0	86

=== April 1 event ===
List of confirmed tornadoes – Monday, April 1, 2024 (Note: All dates are based on the local time zone where the tornado touched down; however, all times are in Coordinated Universal Time for consistency.)
EF#	Location	County / parish	State	Start Coord.	Time (UTC)	Path length	Max width
EF0	Chesterfield	St. Louis	MO	38.653°N 90.551°W	23:32–23:35	2.01 mi (3.23 km)	332 yd (304 m)
EF0	A high-end EF0 tornado caused minor roof and siding damage to homes, blew down part of a fence, and damaged trees, including some that were snapped or uprooted.						
EF1	N of Hominy to SE of Wynona	Osage	OK	36.4763°N 96.4089°W	00:17–00:27	7 mi (11 km)	600 yd (550 m)
EF1	This high-end EF1 tornado snapped or uprooted numerous trees and blew down numerous power poles.						
EF1	ESE of Wynona to W of Barnsdall	Osage	OK	36.5385°N 96.2887°W	00:28–00:36	5.5 mi (8.9 km)	1,000 yd (910 m)
EF1	A large, high-end EF1 tornado formed almost immediately after the previous tornado dissipated. It blew the roof off of a garage, uprooted or snapped trees, and blew down numerous power poles.						
EF1	Southeastern Barnsdall	Osage	OK	36.5583°N 96.1613°W	00:38–00:41	2.2 mi (3.5 km)	550 yd (500 m)
EF1	Homes were damaged, outbuildings were destroyed, and trees and power poles were blown down. An even stronger tornado would strike this area a month later.						
EF1	N of Ochelata	Osage, Washington	OK	36.6335°N 96.0079°W	00:49–00:56	4.9 mi (7.9 km)	550 yd (500 m)
EF1	A tornado damaged outbuildings, uprooted trees, and blew down power poles.						
EF1	N of Delaware	Nowata	OK	36.7883°N 95.6713°W	01:13–01:19	4.2 mi (6.8 km)	600 yd (550 m)
EF1	Trees were uprooted, large tree limbs were snapped, outbuildings were damaged, and power poles were blown down.						
EF1	WNW of Fair Grove	Greene	MO	37.4°N 93.26°W	03:37–03:44	2.08 mi (3.35 km)	100 yd (91 m)
EF1	Several trees were uprooted or snapped, an outbuilding was heavily damaged, and a residence suffered minor damage.						
EF0	NE of Long Lane	Dallas, Laclede	MO	37.63°N 92.87°W	04:06–04:14	2.03 mi (3.27 km)	200 yd (180 m)
EF0	A tornado uprooted and/or snapped over 200 trees, rolled an unanchored mobile home, damaged the roof of a residence, and damaged multiple outbuildings.						
EF0	Morgan	Laclede	MO	37.51°N 92.68°W	04:20–04:27	2.16 mi (3.48 km)	100 yd (91 m)
EF0	An intermittent tornado damaged outbuildings and trees, including some trees that were snapped or uprooted.						
EF0	NNE of Evergreen	Laclede	MO	37.58°N 92.59°W	04:24–04:30	2.3 mi (3.7 km)	100 yd (91 m)
EF0	Some outbuildings and trees were damaged by an intermittent tornado.						

=== April 2 event ===
List of confirmed tornadoes – Tuesday, April 2, 2024
EF#	Location	County / parish	State	Start Coord.	Time (UTC)	Path length	Max width
EF0	St. James	Phelps	MO	37.9955°N 91.6116°W	05:27–05:31	0.26 mi (0.42 km)	10 yd (9.1 m)
EF0	A brief, weak tornado damaged small outbuildings at an elementary school as well as a light pole at a football stadium. A school camera captured the tornado moving over a school building.						
EF1	NW of Garfield	Benton	AR	36.4561°N 94.0265°W	05:33–05:37	2.8 mi (4.5 km)	550 yd (500 m)
EF1	Numerous trees were uprooted.						
EF1	Garfield	Benton	AR	36.449°N 94.0057°W	05:35–05:38	2.4 mi (3.9 km)	300 yd (270 m)
EF1	A twin tornado developed to the south of the previous tornado. The roofs of two homes were damaged, an outbuilding was destroyed, and trees were uprooted.						
EF0	NE of Gordonville	Cape Girardeau	MO	37.3283°N 89.6342°W	09:15–09:16	0.44 mi (0.71 km)	150 yd (140 m)
EF0	A brief tornado downed several large tree limbs. Sporadic damaging winds continued eastward after the tornado dissipated.						
EF2	NNW of Goreville to W of Creal Springs	Williamson	IL	37.6341°N 89.0017°W	09:46–09:52	6.66 mi (10.72 km)	250 yd (230 m)
EF2	This tornado began along IL 148 and crossed over I-57 heading east, causing roof damage to homes and outbuildings and snapping or uprooting trees. The tornado reached its peak intensity of high-end EF2 along the north side of the Lake of Egypt, causing severe roof and structural damage to three businesses and blowing out a window at the nearby fire protection building. The tornado continued to damage homes and outbuildings and snapped or uprooted numerous trees before dissipating.						
EF1	ENE Creal Springs to E of Stonefort	Williamson, Saline	IL	37.6229°N 88.8215°W	09:56–10:03	7.57 mi (12.18 km)	250 yd (230 m)
EF1	Along the beginning of this tornado path, many trees were snapped or uprooted. Moving eastward, the tornado reached its peak intensity of high-end EF1 as it moved directly through Stonefort. A couple of homes had portions of their roofs ripped off; however, the majority of houses were damaged by fallen trees. Outbuildings and a mobile home also had roof damage in the town. The tornado continued to snap and uproot trees east of the town before dissipating.						
EF1	ENE of Kevil	McCracken	KY	37.0941°N 88.8666°W	10:05–10:06	0.6 mi (0.97 km)	50 yd (46 m)
EF1	A house had a portion of its roof removed, a couple of other homes suffered fascia and siding damage, and about a dozen trees had large limbs downed.						
EF2	ESE of Eldorado	Saline	IL	37.7913°N 88.4029°W	10:15–10:16	1.14 mi (1.83 km)	100 yd (91 m)
EF2	A strong tornado destroyed an outbuilding and removed portions of roofing from two homes. An industrial garage and two manufactured homes were severely damaged. One manufactured home was moved several feet off its foundation and had one of its walls torn open, resulting in injury to two occupants. Multiple trees were snapped or uprooted.						
EF1	Ridgway	Gallatin	IL	37.7953°N 88.2712°W	10:21–10:22	0.98 mi (1.58 km)	100 yd (91 m)
EF1	A brief tornado caused roof damage to a house and an outbuilding. A grain bin was also damaged and several trees were downed.						
EF1	S of New Haven, IL	Gallatin (IL), Posey (IN)	IL, IN	37.8893°N 88.2139°W	10:22–10:29	7.45 mi (11.99 km)	100 yd (91 m)
EF1	Several large trees were snapped or uprooted, one of which crushed a small brick building. A manufactured home was severely damaged and a nearby outbuilding had part of its roof ripped off.						
EF1	E of Ridgway	Gallatin	IL	37.7915°N 88.1777°W	10:26–10:28	1.96 mi (3.15 km)	75 yd (69 m)
EF1	A brief tornado caused significant roof damage to a couple of large farm outbuildings and debris was tossed hundreds of feet. A home sustained shingle damage and several trees were snapped or uprooted.						
EF2	NNE of Maunie, IL to S of Wadesville, IN	White (IL), Posey (IN)	IL, IN	38.0646°N 88.0206°W	10:31–10:43	14.9 mi (24.0 km)	250 yd (230 m)
EF2	This EF2 tornado snapped or uprooted hundreds of trees. Several outbuildings and sheds were damaged or destroyed. Several homes sustained minor to moderate roof damage. This tornado eventually merged with the 10:37 UTC tornado.						
EF2	S of Uniontown	Union	KY	37.7631°N 88.0314°W	10:34–10:40	6.84 mi (11.01 km)	150 yd (140 m)
EF2	Several homes sustained significant roof damage and/or were shifted off their foundations. Dozens of trees were snapped or uprooted.						
EF2	SSE of New Harmony to WSW of Darmstadt	Posey	IN	38.0941°N 87.9229°W	10:37–10:48	11.56 mi (18.60 km)	250 yd (230 m)
EF2	A strong tornado snapped or uprooted hundreds of trees and damaged or destroyed dozens of outbuildings. Several homes sustained minor to moderate damage. This tornado merged with the 10:31 UTC tornado.						
EF1	NE of Morganfield	Union	KY	37.7209°N 87.8936°W	10:41–10:42	1.24 mi (2.00 km)	50 yd (46 m)
EF1	A large, newly built farm outbuilding sustained severe roof and wall damage. A home sustained shingle and fascia damage, a shed was destroyed, and a carport was damaged. Several trees were damaged as well.						
EF1	SE of Sturgis	Union	KY	37.4936°N 87.9488°W	10:46–10:47	0.72 mi (1.16 km)	100 yd (91 m)
EF1	A large farm outbuilding was severely damaged, two homes sustained roof damage, and several large trees were snapped at their base. One tree fell on a manufactured home, resulting in injury to a resident.						
EF2	E of Wadesville to Darmstadt to SSW of Elberfeld	Posey, Vanderburgh, Warrick	IN	38.1113°N 87.7214°W	10:47–11:00	14.9 mi (24.0 km)	250 yd (230 m)
EF2	A strong tornado completely ripped the roofs off several homes. Additional but more minor damage occurred to a few other homes as well. Numerous outbuildings or sheds were damaged or destroyed. Hundreds of trees were snapped or uprooted.						
EF2	WNW of Nisbet to NNW of Millersburg	Vanderburgh, Warrick	IN	38.1501°N 87.6823°W	10:47–11:03	14.92 mi (24.01 km)	250 yd (230 m)
EF2	A significant tornado damaged or destroyed dozens of outbuildings, damaged several homes, and snapped electrical power poles. Hundreds of trees were also snapped or uprooted.						
EF1	S of Haubstadt to SE of Elberfeld	Vanderburgh, Warrick	IN	38.1668°N 87.573°W	10:54–11:03	9.55 mi (15.37 km)	200 yd (180 m)
EF1	Dozens of trees were snapped or uprooted and several outbuildings were damaged or destroyed. A few homes sustained minor to moderate damage. This tornado merged with the 10:48 UTC EF2 tornado.						
EF1	S of Elberfeld	Vanderburgh, Warrick	IN	38.157°N 87.5046°W	10:57–11:01	3.05 mi (4.91 km)	150 yd (140 m)
EF1	A home sustained minor roof damage, several outbuildings were damaged or destroyed, and dozens of trees were snapped or uprooted.						
EF1	SSE of Chandler	Warrick	IN	38.0199°N 87.3629°W	11:04–11:06	1.64 mi (2.64 km)	100 yd (91 m)
EF1	Three homes suffered substantial roof damage and hundreds of trees were either snapped or uprooted.						
EF1	SSE of Stanley to SW of Folsomville	Warrick	IN	38.1413°N 87.3349°W	11:05–11:13	8.45 mi (13.60 km)	200 yd (180 m)
EF1	A large barn was destroyed and one home sustained significant shingle damage. A few other houses sustained minor damage as well. Dozens of trees were snapped or uprooted.						
EF1	E of Chaplin	Nelson, Washington	KY	37.9341°N 85.2201°W	12:50–12:56	5.02 mi (8.08 km)	125 yd (114 m)
EF1	Over a dozen barns and outbuildings were heavily damaged or destroyed and extensive tree damage occurred.						
EF1	SW of Lawrenceburg	Anderson	KY	37.9558°N 85.0453°W	12:56–12:59	2.1 mi (3.4 km)	150 yd (140 m)
EF1	A home had extensive roof damage while two nearby barns had large portions of their roofs removed. Another home had minor roof and exterior damage and trees were snapped or twisted.						
EF1	NW of Nicholasville	Woodford, Jessamine	KY	37.981°N 84.6843°W	13:11–13:15	1.78 mi (2.86 km)	300 yd (270 m)
EF1	Multiple barns were significantly damaged or destroyed. A garage door was blown in, a home sustained broken windows, and multiple trees were downed.						
EF1	NNE of Nicholasville	Jessamine	KY	37.9372°N 84.5483°W	13:18–13:19	0.42 mi (0.68 km)	150 yd (140 m)
EF1	A very brief tornado tossed two storage sheds onto a highway. It continued into an industrial park, ripping off large portions of roofing, blowing out doors, and pulling away wall panels from many buildings and warehouses. Boards and drywall were impaled into the surrounding structures and the ground. Three vehicles were flipped over and a heavy travel trailer was moved about 20 yd (18 m).						
EF1	SSE of Monterey to N of Mount Zion	Bourbon, Clark	KY	38.1471°N 84.3042°W	13:20–13:35	12.68 mi (20.41 km)	100 yd (91 m)
EF1	Three funnels consolidated into a tornado that impacted two farms. On one farm, multiple structures sustained damage. On the other property, an open-area structure was collapsed save for one remaining wall. An adjacent stable sustained roof damage and multiple trailers were flipped. Six horses were injured, a barn was demolished, and multiple large trees were downed, which likely caused damage to a stone cabin.						
EF1	WSW of Becknerville	Clark	KY	37.9754°N 84.3056°W	13:30–13:33	1.94 mi (3.12 km)	150 yd (140 m)
EF1	One home had a portion of its roof torn off while others were damaged and trees were snapped.						
EF0	S of Sharpsburg	Bath	KY	38.1756°N 83.9826°W	13:37–13:38	0.36 mi (0.58 km)	75 yd (69 m)
EF0	A home sustained extensive roof damage and some structural damage. The southeast corner of a barn was blown out. Extensive tree damage occurred as well.						
EF0	ENE of Sharpsburg	Bath	KY	38.215°N 83.8319°W	13:39	0.1 mi (0.16 km)	25 yd (23 m)
EF0	The back half of the roofing structure of a manufactured home was lifted. Grass, mud, and insulation plastered the front of the home. This is the only damage caused by this very brief tornado.						
EF1	Greenup to Northern Ironton	Greenup (KY), Lawrence (OH)	KY, OH	38.5713°N 82.839°W	14:12–14:20	7.88 mi (12.68 km)	250 yd (230 m)
EF1	A high-end EF1 tornado began in Greenup beginning at a cemetery in town. The tornado tracked southeast, damaging the roofs of building and downing trees, some onto buildings. The tornado crossed the Ohio River into the town of Hanging Rock, where it impacted a campground. Several RV were overturned and tossed throughout the campgrounds. A salt storage dome was destroyed, causing one employee to get seriously injured. The tornado continued southeastward, damaging a few homes and the Ironton Middle School before weakening and dissipating. This was originally classified as a microburst before reanalysis determined it was a tornado.						
EF1	N of Ironville	Boyd	KY	38.4562°N 82.7122°W	14:21–14:23	1.1 mi (1.8 km)	250 yd (230 m)
EF1	A single-wide trailer home was flipped, and a home was damaged and shifted off its foundation with other homes also receiving damage. This tornado was embedded within a larger area of damaging straight-line winds from the storm.						
EF2	SW of Garner	Boyd	KY	38.2828°N 82.7613°W	14:24–14:26	1.14 mi (1.83 km)	450 yd (410 m)
EF2	This brief but strong tornado caused severe tree damage, destroyed several barns and outbuildings, and removed the roof from a house completely. Additional homes sustained damage.						
EF1	NW of Willow Wood	Lawrence	OH	38.5989°N 82.5055°W	14:26–14:27	1.09 mi (1.75 km)	200 yd (180 m)
EF1	The roofs were blown off three structures, including two homes. Tin panels were uplifted on a barn roof as well. A few trees were knocked down. A travel trailer was rolled.						
EF1	SSW of Huntington	Wayne, Cabell	WV	38.3796°N 82.4614°W	14:34	0.56 mi (0.90 km)	200 yd (180 m)
EF1	Trees were snapped or uprooted by this high-end EF1 tornado. Buildings suffered minor damage as well.						
EF1	NW of Crown City	Lawrence	OH	38.6487°N 82.3778°W	14:34–14:35	0.44 mi (0.71 km)	250 yd (230 m)
EF1	A high-end EF1 tornado snapped or uprooted a significant amount of trees in the Wayne National Forest.						
EF1	NW of Wilson to northern Barboursville	Cabell	WV	38.4346°N 82.3479°W	14:39–14:42	4.2 mi (6.8 km)	200 yd (180 m)
EF1	An intermittent, high-end EF1 tornado touched down next to the Ohio River in West Virginia, tracking southeast and damaging numerous trees.						
EF1	NE of Crown City	Gallia	OH	38.6166°N 82.2417°W	14:40–14:41	0.5 mi (0.80 km)	150 yd (140 m)
EF1	Several large hardwood trees were uprooted in a ravine. Some barns were damaged by fallen trees. The roof and exterior walls of a warehouse were blown off.						
EF1	S of Fraziers Bottom to Bancroft	Putnam	WV	38.5109°N 81.9956°W	14:54–14:59	8.5 mi (13.7 km)	200 yd (180 m)
EF1	An intermittent, low-end EF1 tornado caused scattered tree damage, mainly downing large tree limbs with a few uprooted trees at first. Moving east, a narrow swath of uprooted and snapped trees resulted in the EF1 rating. The tornado continued east, crossing the Kanawha River before dissipating in Bancroft.						
EF0	Southern Buffalo	Putnam	WV	38.6055°N 81.9804°W	14:55–14:56	0.55 mi (0.89 km)	100 yd (91 m)
EF0	A high-end EF0 tornado uprooted and snapped several large trees.						
EF1	SE of St. Albans to Northern Dunbar	Kanawha	WV	38.3697°N 81.8157°W	15:02–15:06	5 mi (8.0 km)	300 yd (270 m)
EF1	An EF1 tornado snapped or uprooted a significant number of trees, many of which fell on and damaged homes. Another house had its roof blown off.						
EF2	Cross Lanes to S of Wallace	Kanawha	WV	38.4329°N 81.8109°W	15:04–15:10	8 mi (13 km)	300 yd (270 m)
EF2	This intermittent but strong low-end EF2 tornado traveled near the Putnam-Kanawha County line. Several large and healthy trees were snapped at their bases and uprooted. Minor damage to homes was noted in the area, too. The tornado traveled due east, continuing to snap and uproot trees. One of the trees fell onto a home, which significantly damaged the second story of the home. Before lifting, several additional large trees were either snapped and/or uprooted.						
EF1	W of Hernshaw to Southern Marmet	Kanawha	WV	38.2353°N 81.6569°W	15:11–15:15	5.14 mi (8.27 km)	200 yd (180 m)
EF1	A tornado began in the Kanawha State Forest and skipped along an intermittent path eastward. The top floor was blown off of one structure, an RV was rolled, and significant tree damage occurred. The tornado dissipated before reaching I-64.						
EF1	Quick to NE of Coalridge	Kanawha	WV	38.3735°N 81.4227°W	15:15–15:17	2.25 mi (3.62 km)	200 yd (180 m)
EF1	Two mobile homes were destroyed, a utility pole was snapped at its base, and significant tree damage occurred.						
EF1	Dry Branch	Kanawha	WV	38.1717°N 81.4610°W	15:21–15:22	0.78 mi (1.26 km)	100 yd (91 m)
EF1	A tornado snapped and uprooted trees and damaged the roofs of a few homes.						
EF1	SW of Georgetown	Harrison, Floyd	IN	38.2699°N 86.0216°W	17:09–17:15	3.2 mi (5.1 km)	30 yd (27 m)
EF1	A tornado touched down multiple times, primarily inflicting damage to trees. One home had a portion of its roof decking ripped off and thrown. Roofing material and outdoor accessories were blown away as well. Another home also sustained damage to its gutter covers.						
EF0	S of Goodrich to WNW of Limestone	Kankakee	IL	41.0841°N 88.0599°W	19:02–19:08	4.6 mi (7.4 km)	50 yd (46 m)
EF0	A grain silo was tossed into a field. Trees and barns were also damaged.						
EFU	NNE of Irwin	Kankakee	IL	41.0927°N 87.9677°W	19:10–19:11	0.65 mi (1.05 km)	10 yd (9.1 m)
EFU	A narrow rope tornado was photographed by several people. No known damage occurred.						
EF0	W of Whitaker	Kankakee	IL	41.2493°N 87.7613°W	19:30–19:31	0.52 mi (0.84 km)	25 yd (23 m)
EF0	This short-lived tornado caused damage to power poles as well as a small metal structure that was destroyed.						
EF2	S of Hico	Fayette	WV	38.0845°N 81.004°W	20:31–20:36	5.31 mi (8.55 km)	325 yd (297 m)
EF2	A strong tornado touched down and immediately started causing considerable and significant tree damage, snapping and uprooting hundreds of trees. Several homes were damaged by trees, including one home that had significant roof damage. The tornado made a slight jog to the northeast where the tornado reached its peak intensity with significant tree damage. The tornado damaged or destroyed several homes, shifting one home several feet off its foundation and tossing the metal roof approximately 350 yd (320 m).						
EF1	Sunbright	Morgan	TN	36.242°N 84.6725°W	21:20–21:25	2.86 mi (4.60 km)	150 yd (140 m)
EF1	A tornado touched down in downtown Sunbright and dealt damage to numerous residential and commercial structures. As the tornado tracked northeast, exiting the town, some metal building structures, barns, and trees in this area were damaged. The tornado re-intensified and damaged several more homes and barns before it dissipated. This tornado occurred almost exactly one year after a tornado struck Sunbright during an outbreak the previous year.						
EF2	Watson, IN to Prospect, KY to WNW of Brownsboro, KY	Clark (IN), Jefferson (KY), Oldham (KY)	IN, KY	38.348°N 85.7207°W	21:31–21:45	11.15 mi (17.94 km)	450 yd (410 m)
EF2	See section on this tornado – There were 22 injuries.						
EF2	Buckner	Oldham	KY	38.3862°N 85.4978°W	21:46–21:53	5.33 mi (8.58 km)	300 yd (270 m)
EF2	An EF2 tornado impacted multiple homes, ripping off large portions of roofing, blowing out windows, and inverting or blowing out garage doors. The roof HVAC system at a high school was blown to the ground, and a nearby streetlight was bent. An adjacent metal warehouse sustained some roof damage and had its garage doors inverted. A large, open-faced metal RV storage building likewise sustained damage to its roof and walls. Numerous trees were snapped or uprooted as well.						
EF1	SW of Bear Branch	Ohio	IN	38.9034°N 85.1399°W	21:52–21:57	3.34 mi (5.38 km)	100 yd (91 m)
EF1	A tornado touched down in the southwesternmost corner of Ohio County before destroying a garage and a well-constructed barn. The tornado continued east through inaccessible areas, uprooting trees before lifting.						
EF0	N of Richmond	Wayne	IN	39.8503°N 84.869°W	21:53–21:58	3.42 mi (5.50 km)	200 yd (180 m)
EF0	A weak tornado developed north of Richmond where trees were broken off and uprooted at the start of the damage path. From there, the tornado traveled northeast across I-70 causing mainly tree damage along its path. After the tornado crossed the interstate, it widened briefly, damaging several barns, outbuildings, and residential structures. Several of the barns lost major portions of their roofs, trailers were tipped over, and a porch was damaged on a home. The tornado then continued over open fields before dissipating as it approached the Ohio-Indiana state line.						
EF1	NW of Jericho to ESE of New Castle	Henry	KY	38.4081°N 85.2901°W	21:58–22:09	7.78 mi (12.52 km)	200 yd (180 m)
EF1	This high-end EF1 tornado destroyed a poorly anchored double-wide mobile home, and damaged homes, businesses, outbuildings, and trees.						
EF1	NW of Leighton	Colbert	AL	34.6922°N 87.5683°W	21:55–22:06	6.96 mi (11.20 km)	750 yd (690 m)
EF1	Numerous trees were damaged and a boat resting on a trailer was flipped and thrown 20 yd (18 m).						
EF0	S of Brooksville	Bracken	KY	38.6672°N 84.0904°W	23:15–23:19	3.2 mi (5.1 km)	250 yd (230 m)
EF0	Several barns, outbuildings, and trees were damaged.						
EF1	Minerva to SW of Ripley	Mason	KY	38.704°N 83.9216°W	23:27–23:31	3.5 mi (5.6 km)	300 yd (270 m)
EF1	Numerous trees were uprooted and snapped and a structure suffered considerable roof loss and partial collapse of a second story brick wall.						
EF1	NNW of Manchester to NNE of West Union	Adams	OH	38.7662°N 83.647°W	23:46–23:57	7.87 mi (12.67 km)	500 yd (460 m)
EF1	A tornado touched down and immediately destroyed a poorly anchored mobile home. Tree and outbuilding damage also occurred in the area before the tornado tracked northeast. The tornado removed the roof of a covered bridge. Several well-constructed outbuildings were damaged and multiple large trees were snapped nearby as the tornado reached its peak intensity. More trees were snapped and uprooted as the tornado continued northeast. The tornado then briefly entered Adams Lake State Park, where considerable tree damage occurred before the tornado lifted.						
EF0	NE of Athens	Limestone	AL	34.8261°N 86.8947°W	23:01–23:04	1.11 mi (1.79 km)	123 yd (112 m)
EF0	Multiple small and large tree branches were snapped, a garage and a shed lost a significant amount of their metal roofing, and several large trees were uprooted.						
EF0	E of Linnville to N of Gratiot	Licking	OH	39.9691°N 82.3146°W	00:08–00:15	5.29 mi (8.51 km)	150 yd (140 m)
EF0	A tornado developed and moved northeast causing mainly tree and minor structural damage along its path.						
EF1	N of Zanesville to SSE of Adamsville	Muskingum	OH	40.0085°N 82.0162°W	00:32–00:44	8.16 mi (13.13 km)	75 yd (69 m)
EF1	The tornado began at the Parr Airport, where it collapsed a hangar and shifted tied-down aircraft. The roof was lifted off a single-wide manufactured home; two barns and a frame home sustained roof damage as well. A small shed was destroyed. Numerous trees were snapped or uprooted.						
EF2	SSW of Leo	Jackson	OH	39.0917°N 82.7198°W	00:47–00:50	1.87 mi (3.01 km)	325 yd (297 m)
EF2	A brief but strong tornado leveled an extensive portion of a thick forest. One home was damaged by a fallen tree.						
EF0	WSW of Bloomfield	Muskingum	OH	40.0345°N 81.8167°W	00:49–00:51	1.21 mi (1.95 km)	50 yd (46 m)
EF0	A weak tornado snapped a few trees and caused roof damage to a few outbuildings.						
EF1	NE of Bloomfield	Guernsey	OH	40.0741°N 81.7179°W	00:57–00:58	1.29 mi (2.08 km)	75 yd (69 m)
EF1	Numerous trees were snapped or uprooted. A barn sustained minor structural damage and a manufactured home sustained partial roof damage.						
EF1	SW of Chandlersville	Muskingum	OH	39.8847°N 81.8478°W	01:20–01:21	0.54 mi (0.87 km)	150 yd (140 m)
EF1	Numerous trees were snapped or uprooted and a barn lost some of its metal roofing panels.						
EF1	W of Plantersville	Dallas, Chilton	AL	32.641°N 87.0398°W	03:28–03:37	8.28 mi (13.33 km)	600 yd (550 m)
EF1	Hundreds of trees were uprooted or snapped by this tornado, some of which blocked roads and fell near homes.						
EF1	NE of Pletcher to SE of Clanton	Chilton	AL	32.7121°N 86.7786°W	03:49–04:06	15.07 mi (24.25 km)	450 yd (410 m)
EF1	Numerous trees sustained damage and multiple homes and outbuildings were damaged. A car trailer was blown 100 yd (91 m) and destroyed, as well as a barn. An additional home sustained roof damage before the tornado dissipated.						
EF2	Northern Conyers	Rockdale	GA	33.6554°N 84.0903°W	03:49–04:06	9.47 mi (15.24 km)	800 yd (730 m)
EF2	To the west of Conyers, this tornado snapped or uprooted numerous trees and damaged homes in multiple neighborhoods. A small area of low-end EF2 damage occurred in an area where a home had a large portion of its roof removed and a nearby power pole was snapped. After crossing I-20/US 278, the tornado moved through the northern part of Conyers, causing weaker but still significant damage to homes, vehicles, and businesses. The tornado then dissipated northeast of the town along SR 138. Two people were injured.						
EF1	N of Rockford	Coosa	AL	32.9182°N 86.245°W	04:28–04:31	2.65 mi (4.26 km)	400 yd (370 m)
EF1	A brief tornado caused minor damage to trees and vegetation.						
EF0	Kellyton	Coosa	AL	32.9712°N 86.0793°W	04:40–04:44	2.28 mi (3.67 km)	175 yd (160 m)
EF0	Minor tree damage occurred.						

=== April 3 event ===
List of confirmed tornadoes –Wednesday, April 3, 2024
EF#	Location	County / parish	State	Start Coord.	Time (UTC)	Path length	Max width
EF0	Centerville	Houston	GA	32.6107°N 83.7144°W	07:44–07:46	1.24 mi (2.00 km)	150 yd (140 m)
EF0	A very brief tornado touched down in a small forested area in town, snapping a few trees and damaging power lines and poles. A few retail signs were damaged as well.						
EF1	SW of Cordele	Crisp	GA	31.9113°N 83.922°W	08:49–08:56	5.55 mi (8.93 km)	300 yd (270 m)
EF1	A waterspout began over Lake Blackshear and moved ashore, damaging numerous trees on the lake. Several homes sustained significant damage due to falling trees and others were dealt roof damage. Two farm pivot-irrigation systems were flipped and a few more trees were snapped before the tornado lifted.						
EF0	SW Ponte Vedra	St. Johns	FL	30.0759°N 81.47°W	16:08–16:09	0.25 mi (0.40 km)	125 yd (114 m)
EF0	A weak tornado damaged a lanai screen, removed shingles off a home, and blew a fence out.						
EF1	NNE of Farnham to ESE of Lodge	Richmond, Northumberland	VA	37.933°N 76.6004°W	20:04–20:10	5.78 mi (9.30 km)	100 yd (91 m)
EF1	A tornado demolished a storage shed and uprooted numerous trees as it touched down. The tornado quickly moved northeast through a golf course where additional trees and sheds were damaged. After exiting the golf course, two houses saw portions of their roofs peeled off. More roof damage on houses occurred and more trees were uprooted before the tornado lifted.						

=== Watson, Indiana/Prospect–Brownsboro, Kentucky ===
Watson, Indiana/Prospect–Brownsboro, Kentucky
- The tornado seen in Prospect, Kentucky

Meteorological history
- Formed: April 2, 2024, 5:31 p.m. EDT (UTC−04:00)
- Dissipated: April 2, 2024, 5:45 p.m. EDT (UTC−04:00)
- Duration: 14 minutes

EF2 tornado
- on the Enhanced Fujita scale
- Highest winds: 120 mph (250 km/h)

Overall effects
- Fatalities: 0
- Injuries: 22

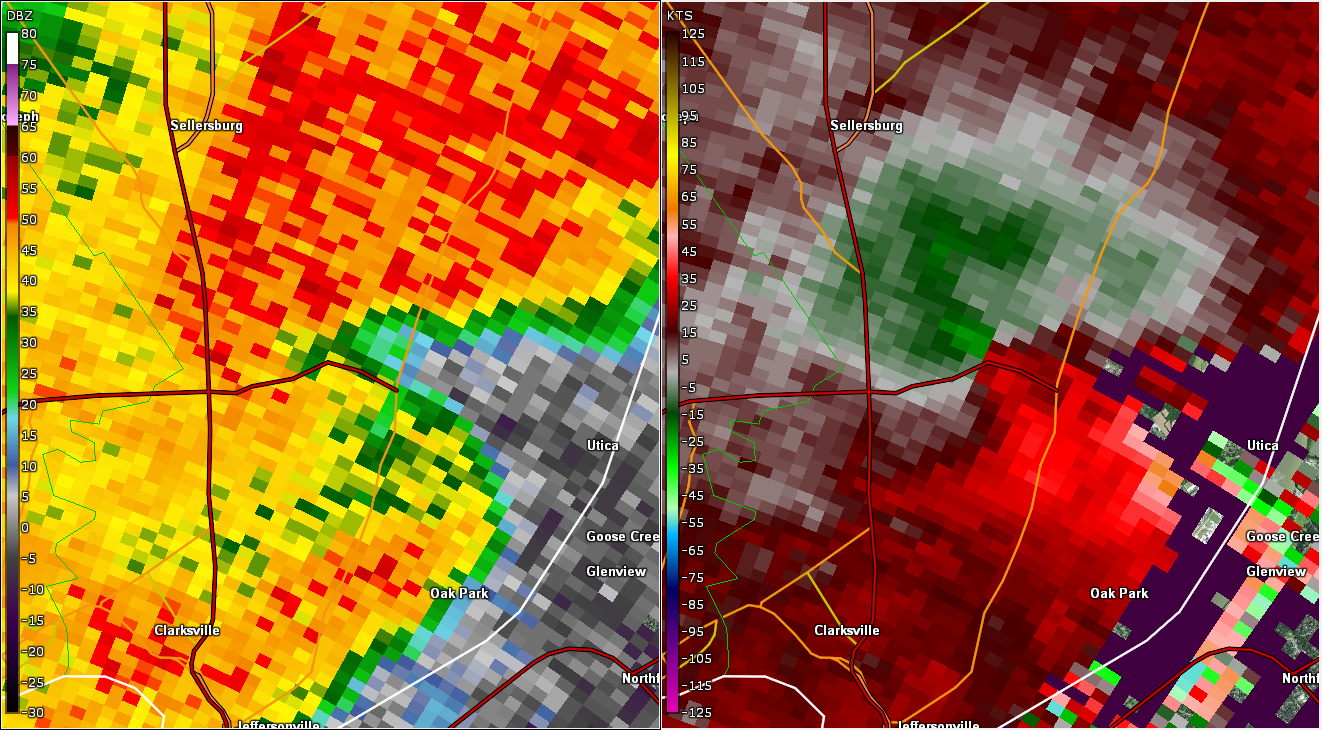
Radar image of the EF2 Prospect, Kentucky tornado as it was over the Brookhollow community in the far northern part of Jeffersonville, Indiana. Event page: Reflectivity (left) and Velocity (right) at the start of the tornado

This strong tornado began along the north side of SR 265/SR 62 west of Watson, Indiana in Clark County. It moved eastward, uprooting trees and damaging an outbuilding at EF0 strength. The tornado then quickly intensified to EF1 strength as it crossed SR 62 and moved through Watson, knocking over three tractor trailers on SR 62 and uprooting several trees. After uprooting additional trees and damaging two homes and an outbuilding, the tornado moved through the neighborhood of Brookhollow in the far northern part of Jeffersonville. In Brookhollow, numerous garage doors were blown out, windows were broken, brick facade crumbled, trees were uprooted, and large sections of roofs were blown off structures. Many boards were impaled and driven more than a foot into the ground with others being impaled into homes. A large metal building also had portions of its walls removed.

The tornado then crossed SR 265 and struck an industrial business at the International Drive/Old Salem Road interchange. The building had parts of its roof section pulled and twisted and a 5,000 lb (2,300 kg) salt pod was lifted up over a 4 ft (1.2 m) concrete barrier and thrown down a hill approximately 40 yd (37 m). The tornado then crossed SR 265 again and broke windows and peeled metal roofing off of more homes in the northern part of Utica before beginning an erratic eastward movement crossing the Ohio River into Kentucky.

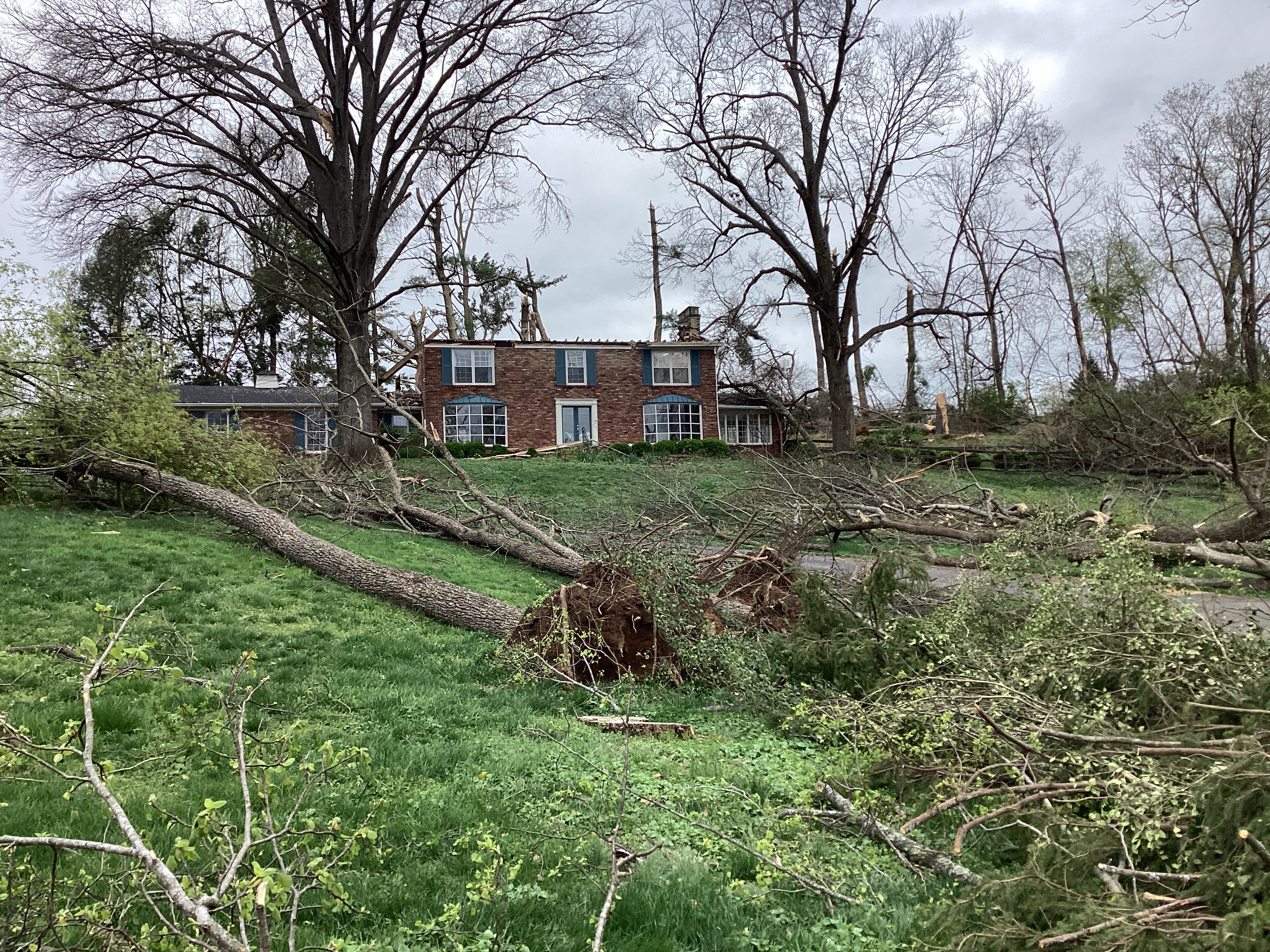
Large sections of roof removed from a home in Prospect, Kentucky.

As it entered Jefferson County, the tornado widened and reached its peak intensity of EF2 as it moved into Prospect and struck the Beechland Beach neighborhood. Three well-built two-story homes suffered significant roof damage, had broken windows had air conditioner units twisted and torn from the sides of them. Another home suffered a collapsed exterior wall, and three large pin oak trees were snapped. Continuing to move erratically eastward, the tornado weakened but reached its maximum width as it moved through Hays Kennedy Park and entered the Sutherland neighborhood at high-end EF1 intensity. Numerous homes suffered roof damage, power lines were downed, power poles were snapped, and trees were uprooted. One homeowner was trapped in the basement of his home when a tree fell on his home; he had to be freed by his neighbors. Nearby, a 7 ft (2.1 m) section of a locust tree was torn off, thrown 20 yd (18 m), and impaled about 4 ft (1.2 m) into the ground. A personal weather station on the fence at a home on the edge of the tornado's path recorded a wind gust of 79 mph (127 km/h). The tornado then crossed US 42 and entered the Hunting Creek neighborhood, where more trees were uprooted and more roof damage was dealt to homes, including two homes that suffered total roofing loss; this damage was rated low-end EF2 while the rest of the peak damage received an EF1 rating. The tornado then exited Hunting Creek and crossed into Oldham County as it entered Hidden Creek at a weaker low-end EF1 intensity. Trees were uprooted, barns took damage to their overhead doors and sheet metal, and some homes incurred roof damage. The tornado finally exited Prospect, weakened to EF0 strength as it crossed KY 1694, and turned northeast, striking the southern portion of a golf course, uprooting trees and damaging barns. The tornado then lifted northeast of the golf course as it crossed KY 329/KY 1694 near Brownsboro as another EF2 tornado was forming to the north.

The tornado was on the ground for 14 minutes, traveled 11.59 mi (18.65 km), and reached a peak width of 450 yd (410 m). There were 22 injuries in Jefferson County.

== Non-tornadic effects ==
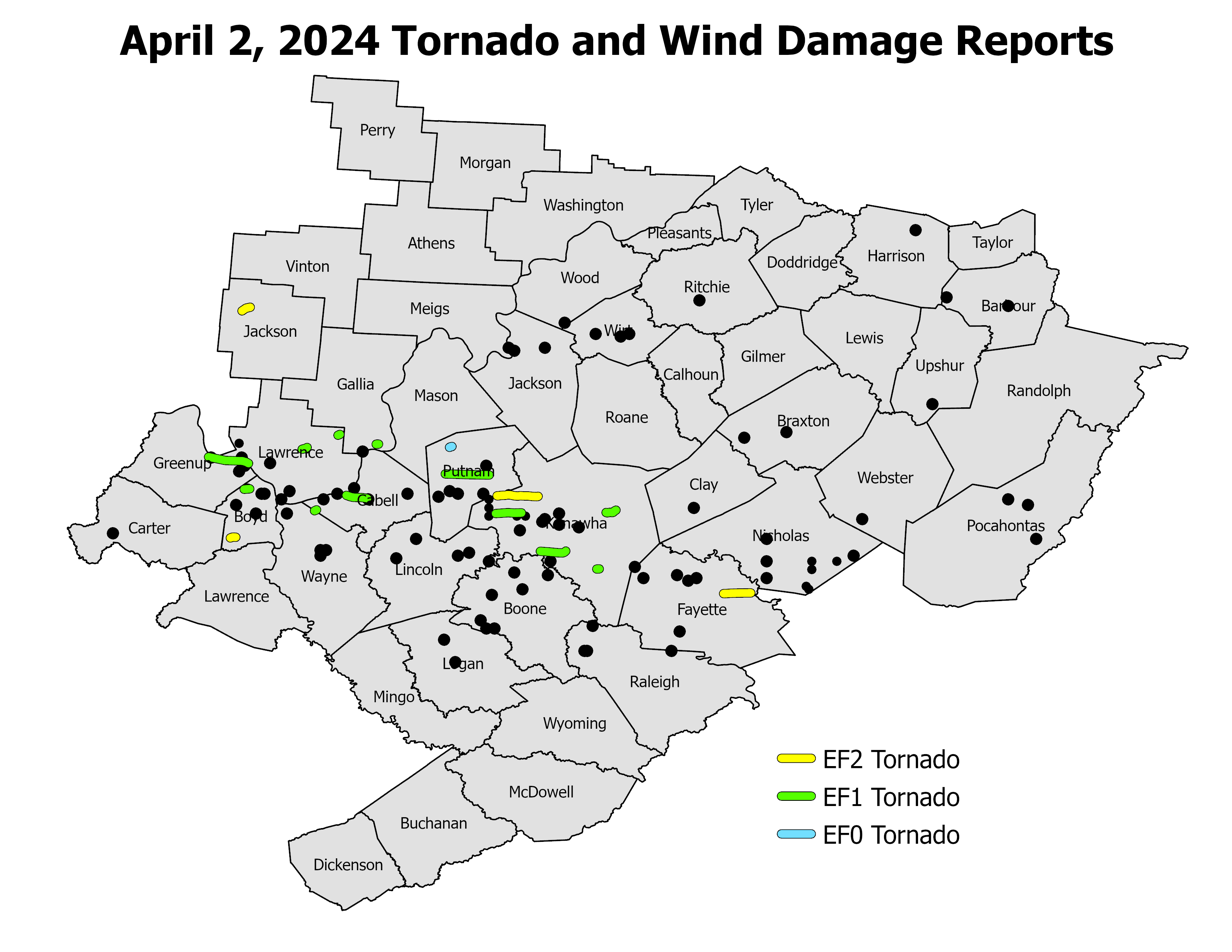
A map of the tornadoes and straight-line wind damage reports from April 2, 2024

Many areas of Ohio, Kentucky, Indiana and West Virginia were put under flood watches prior to the event. In West Virginia, there were dozens of reports of straight-line wind damage along with the tornadoes. A wind gust of 92 mph (148 km/h) was recorded at Tri-State Airport in Huntington, West Virginia, which set an all-time record for that station. Heavy snowfall also affected the Midwest, with up to 17 in (43 cm) of snow falling in Wisconsin. The University of Kentucky campus in Lexington suffered minor damage from high winds, and afternoon classes and on-campus activities were canceled. The Scioto Audubon Metro Park was completely flooded.

Severe storms across the Northeastern United States on April 3 produced a daily rainfall record of 1.75 in (44 mm) of precipitation at LaGuardia Airport in New York City, with even heavier rainfall totals in Newark, New Jersey. Wind gusts in Central Park reached 59 mph (95 km/h). Lightning also struck the Statue of Liberty during the storms, resulting in viral social media attention. Two Major League Baseball games at Citi Field were postponed during the storm. On April 2, two people were fatally crushed by fallen trees in Pennsylvania. Another fatality occurred in New York on April 3 due to downed trees. In Tulsa, Oklahoma, a woman's body was found in a drainage ditch; they were likely swept away during flooding. Another person was also killed in Campbell County, Kentucky. Further north, up to 21.5 in (55 cm) of snow fell in Northern New England, with over 600,000 customers losing power.

Over 250,000 people were left without power in the wake of the storm; with many of those outages in West Virginia. On the afternoon of April 2, the state of Kentucky issued a state of emergency. West Virginia also declared a state of emergency for 21 counties. President Joe Biden approved a major disaster declaration for portions of Kentucky, and several counties in West Virginia also qualified for individual assistance from the Federal Emergency Management Agency (FEMA), which allowed storm victims to receive federal money to repair damage caused by the storms.

== See also ==
- List of North American tornadoes and tornado outbreaks
- List of derecho events
- Weather of 2024
- List of United States tornadoes in April 2024
- 1974 Super Outbreak – A historic and deadly tornado outbreak that occurred almost exactly 50 years earlier and impacted many of the same areas.
- 1991 West Virginia Derecho – another severe derecho event that occurred in some of the same areas during the month of April.
- June 2012 Derecho – another high-end derecho which impacted the same region twelve years prior.
- Tornado outbreak of March 31 – April 1, 2023 – a historic outbreak that happened the year prior.
- Tornado outbreak of March 13–15, 2024 – another significant outbreak that happened earlier in the year.
- Tornado outbreak sequence of May 19–27, 2024 – yet another tornado and severe storm event that impacted many of the same areas.
- Tornado outbreak and floods of April 2–7, 2025 – another outbreak that impacted similar areas one year later.
