= Brush Creek (Osage Fork Gasconade River tributary) =

Stream in the American state of Missouri

Brush Creek is a stream in southern Laclede County in the U.S. state of Missouri. It is a tributary of the Osage Fork Gasconade River.

The stream headwaters arise about one mile northeast of Phillipsburg adjacent to I-44 at 37°33′51″N 92°47′01″W. The stream flows southeast under I-44 and then generally east passing under Missouri Route C and then route PP north of Morgan. It continues east to its confluence with the Osage Fork about 1.5 miles west of Missouri Route 5 at 37°32′12″N 92°37′18″W.

Brush Creek was named for the thick brush lining its course.

== See also ==
- List of rivers of Missouri
