= 2012 North American heat wave =

Weather event in North America

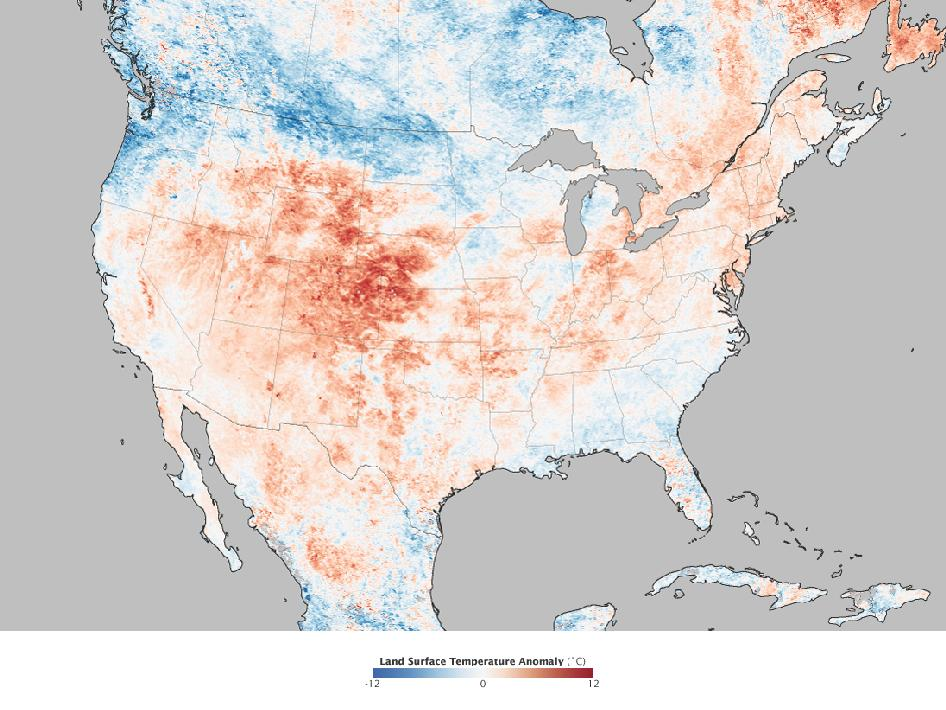
- Map of land surface temperature anomalies for June 17–24, 2012. The map depicts temperatures compared to the 2000–2011 average for the same eight-day period in June. (Land surface temperatures (LST) are distinct from the hot air temperatures that meteorological stations typically measure.)

Meteorological history
- Duration: mid June - August 2012
- Heat event
- Max temp: 118 °F (48 °C)

Overall effects
- Fatalities: 82 direct, 22 indirect
- Damage: $30 billion (2012 USD)

The Summer 2012 North American heat wave was one of the most severe heat waves in modern North American history. It resulted in more than 82 heat-related deaths across the United States and Canada, and an additional twenty-two people died in the resultant June 2012 North American derecho. This long-lived, straight-line wind and its thunderstorms cut electrical power to 3.7 million customers. Over 500,000 were still without power on July 6, as the heat wave continued. Temperatures generally decreased somewhat the week of July 9 in the east, but the high pressure shifted to the west, causing the core of the hot weather to build in the Mountain States and the Southwestern United States shifting eastwards again by mid-July. By early August, the core of the heat remained over the Southern Plains.

== Cause ==
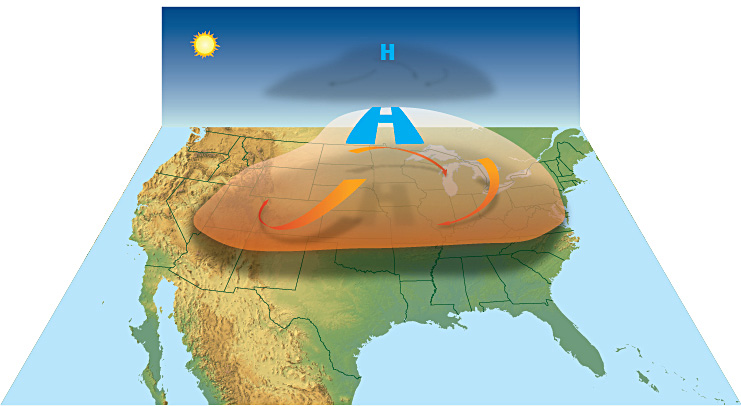
High pressure aloft traps heat near the ground, causing a heat wave

The heat wave formed when high pressure aloft over the Baja California, Mexico, strengthened and moved over the southern plains around June 20–23 and then spread east and northward, remaining fixed over the center of North America through July 2012.

The direct cause of the heat is that, under high pressure, the air subsides (sinks) toward the surface. This sinking air acts as a dome capping the atmosphere. This cap helps to trap heat instead of allowing it to lift. Without the lift there is little or no convection and therefore little or no convective clouds (cumulus clouds) with minimal chances for rain. The result is a continual build-up of heat at the surface resulting in drought conditions over wide areas.

This heat wave, like all extreme weather events, has its direct cause in a complex set of atmospheric conditions that produce short-term weather. However, weather occurs within the broader context of the climate, and many scientists agree that global warming has made it more likely that heat waves of this magnitude will occur. A NASA-sponsored study indicates an increase in the drying tendency from spring to summer over the U.S. Central Plains, especially during the transition from June to July. The intensified deficit in precipitation is accompanied by increased downward shortwave radiation flux, tropospheric subsidence, enhanced evaporative fraction, and elevated planetary boundary layer height, all of which can lead to surface drying. These conditions are similar to those accompanying the 2012 drought and intense heat that occurred in mid-summer.

== Timeline of impacts ==
=== Beginning of heat wave ===
The intense heat wave in the West was initiated around June 20–23 when the high pressure system centered over the Baja of California shifted upward into the plains and caused temperatures to approach or even surpass 110 °F (43 °C) for the next several days, breaking many records for the area.

The heat spread east from the Rocky Mountains and a massive high-pressure system over the Midwest caused extreme temperatures not seen on such a scale since the 1930s. On June 25, 2012, Denver, Colorado, tied its all-time high with a temperature of 105 °F (40.6 °C). On the same day a couple of 113 °F (45 °C) readings were recorded in Kansas. The heat was so strong that Alamosa, Colorado, broke its daily record for six consecutive days. In Galveston, Texas, the earliest 100 °F (38 °C) day ever was recorded. Hill City, Kansas, was the warmest point in the United States on June 26, with the thermometer climbing to 115 °F (46.1 °C).

Thousands of records were again broken on June 28. Fort Wayne, Indiana, tied its all-time record high with 106 °F (41.1 °C) while Indianapolis broke its monthly record at 104 °F (40 °C). More monthly records that day included St. Louis, Missouri, at 108 °F (42.2 °C) and Little Rock, Arkansas, at 107 °F (41.7 °C). The heat resulted in two boys from Bradley County, Tennessee, dying of hyperthermia.

In the Mid-South, from June 28 through June 30, many notable temperature extremes occurred. In Paducah, Kentucky, June 29 witnessed an all time official record of 108 °F (42.2 °C). In Bowling Green, Kentucky, the same day witnessed 109 °F (42.8 °C), one degree Fahrenheit (0.6 °C) short of the state's all-time record for June. Perhaps more remarkable, Tennessee observed a handful of all-time record highs. Nashville reached 109 °F (42.8 °C) on June 30, 11 °F (6.1 °C) higher than the previous record. Knoxville reached a high of 105 °F (40.6 °C), while Chattanooga reached 107 °F (41.7 °C), an all-time high, on both June 30 and July 1. And, although not officially verified by the National Weather Service at this time, Smyrna, Tennessee, recorded a reading of 113 °F (45.0 °C) on the 29th, which would in fact be the highest recorded temperature in the state.

In Fort Good Hope, Northwest Territories, there was a streak of five consecutive days above 30 °C (86 °F) from June 21 to June 25 peaking at 35 °C (95 °F), quite possibly the longest heat wave in Canada at that time. Further south, on June 19, 20 and 21, Toronto experienced its first official early season heat wave (In Canada, a heat wave is defined as three or more consecutive days with temperatures at or above 32 °C (89.6 °F)), with temperatures ranging between 33.4 °C (92.1 °F) and 34.5 °C (94.1 °F) and the minimum temperature on June 20 not dropping below 24.4 °C (75.9 °F). On both July 4 and July 6, Toronto reached 36.3 °C (97.3 °F) and on July 17, the city hit 36.8 °C (98.3 °F), making this the hottest day of the year in the city and the 5th record daily high of the summer.

=== Spread to Southeastern U.S. ===
The high pressure ridge continued to slide eastward and centered itself over Tennessee, causing hundreds of records to be matched or surpassed for multiple states, including Illinois, Indiana, Kentucky, Georgia, North Carolina, and Washington, D.C., among others.

The scorching heat continued on June 29 when Athens, Georgia, and Columbia, South Carolina, set new all-time record high temperatures of 113 °F (45 °C). Washington, D.C., recorded its highest June temperature ever at 104 °F (40 °C), and Charlotte, North Carolina, and Raleigh, North Carolina, were warm enough to tie their all-time record highs at 104 °F (40 °C) and 105 °F (40.6 °C) respectively. On June 30, Atlanta, Georgia, set a new all-time record high temperature of 106 °F (41.1 °C). A statewide record high was even set across the entire state of South Carolina.

The Mid-Atlantic States did not escape the heat. On June 29, Salisbury, Maryland, recorded a monthly record high of 101 °F (38.3 °C), while Baltimore (DMH) reached 106 °F (41.1 °C) on June 29, setting a similar month of June record.

=== Northeast and Midwest ===
Chicago's O'Hare International Airport tied its all-time 4th of July record of 102 °F (38.9 °C) which was set back in 1912. Not far from O'Hare, the official measuring station for the city of Chicago, the villages of Park Ridge, Niles, Norridge as well as much of the Chicago metropolitan area recorded a temperature of 104 °F (40 °C). Some places north of Chicago got even hotter. Caledonia, Wisconsin, just south of Milwaukee reached 107 °F (41.7 °C). Actual air temperatures were close to 110 °F (43.3 °C) in and around the city of Allegan, Michigan. St. Louis endured a string of ten straight days with temperatures above 100 °F (38 °C), ending on July 7. As of July 7, three deaths in St. Louis were attributed to the heat.

As of July 6, Chicago has had four official 100 °F (38 °C) or higher temperature readings, one on June 28, along with three in July, culminating with an official near-record shattering high of 103 °F (39 °C) at O'Hare on both July 5 and 6, reaching 106 °F (41.1 °C) near Chicago, the following day reaching 98 °F shortly before 11 am at O'Hare International Airport, but much of the Chicago metro area west and south of the airport reached or exceeded 100 degrees, marking the fourth consecutive day of 100-degree heat across the Chicago area. The city proper tied the old record of three consecutive 100-degree days which was set back in August 1947. Normally, the highest temperature recorded in a typical Chicago summer is around 95 °F (35 °C), a streak of 3 days above 90 °F (32 °C) constitutes a "heat wave", and the thermometer reaches or surpasses 100 °F (38 °C) only once every five to ten years. The Chicago temperatures exceeded the 1995 Chicago heat wave, which claimed over 750 lives, although humidity and registered dew points were higher during that heat wave. Through the first five days of July, the mean temperature in Chicago averaged 86.4 °F (30.2 °C), 13.2 °F (7 °C) above normal, the hottest since 1911. Two deaths were confirmed from the heat in Cook County, and two other people died in a train derailment blamed on the heat. An additional death in Rock County, Wisconsin, has been noted.

The heat caused highways to buckle in Illinois, North Carolina, and Wisconsin.

After a brief respite from the extreme heat, the Mid-Atlantic States resumed observation of record highs by the end of the first week of July. Maryland has been particularly hard-hit, with eight deaths, including four on July 5. Cumberland, Maryland, recorded a monthly record of 104 °F (40.0 °C) on July 8. Bremo Bluff, Virginia, recorded an astounding 109 °F (43 °C), which is an all-time-record high on July 8.

The Northeastern United States suffered the worst of the heat wave on July 7–8. Even normally cool plateau regions experienced highs over 90 °F. Laurel Mountain, Pennsylvania, near Johnstown, reached 95 °F (35.0 °C) on July 8, beating the previous all-time-record high by 2 °F (1.1 °C). Similarly, on July 7, daily record highs were broken in several cities in eastern Pennsylvania, including Harrisburg, Lancaster, and Chambersburg, which each reached 101 °F (38.3 °C). Pittsburgh reached 98° on July 7, which, while not a daily record (101° in 1988), was the hottest temperature recorded there since it reached 100° on July 15, 1995. Cleveland, Ohio reached 101 °F on July 21. Akron-Canton airport said that it was its warmest year on record with an all time July record of 101 °F on July 7. On July 8, the heat eased across the east as the high pressure center shifted west, causing hot weather once again build in the mountain states and the southwest U. S.

=== Heat continues in Great Plains, spreads into New England ===
After some modification in the heat during the past week over the Midwest and Northeast, the jet once again moved further north into Canada allowing intense heat to build across eastern North America. On July 15, Temperatures reached 109 °F (42.8 °C) in Pierre, South Dakota.

On July 17, the temperature at Detroit, Michigan Metro Airport climbed to 102 °F (38.9 °C), the third plus 100 degree day thus far in July. The average July maximum temperature is 83 °F (28.3 °C). On the same date Toronto, Ontario, Canada reached 36.8 °C (98.2 °F), by July 23 it recorded its fourth daily record high temperature for the month.

The Northeastern states also experienced a second round of heat, with temps again returning to the 90's. Atlantic City, New Jersey, reached 101 °F (38.3 °C) on July 18, a daily record high. The same day, Newark, New Jersey, reached 104 °F (40.0 °C), a daily record. Teterboro Airport, NJ recorded a monthly record high of 103 °F (39.4 °C). Philadelphia, PA hit a temperature of 108 °F (42.2 °C). Triple-digit temperatures even reached Hartford, Connecticut, where, on July 18, the city reached 100 °F (37.8 °C), which was a monthly record high.

As of July 25, St. Louis, Missouri endured its 16th straight day of plus 100 °F (37.8 °C) heat with 27 of the past 28 days exceeding this temperature, with high 90s forecast over the next few days. 24 deaths have been attributed to the heat in St. Louis metro area.

=== Heat wave continues in the Southwest ===
As of August 13, 90 to 100-degree plus heat was still occurring in the desert Southwest and in many western states, associated with the same upper-level ridge of high pressure. The heat wave continued at one location or another within the Contiguous US for over two months' worth of consecutive days. A major jet stream dip and associated upper-level trough of low pressure brought rain, storms, and cooler weather to parts of the eastern and central US, slightly lessening drought impacts in some areas.

=== Other impacts ===
Wildfires raged across the western United States during the time of the heat wave, in part attributable to the dry conditions caused by the heat. The Waldo Canyon fire in Colorado attracted the most attention after spreading into Colorado Springs and charring hundreds of homes (investigators determined it to be human caused, rather than from "the heat"), but large wildfires also burned throughout Utah, Wyoming, Montana, New Mexico, Arizona and Idaho.

The heat wave also contributed to the record-shattering 2012 North American drought, which caused massive crop failures throughout the Midwest. The drought affected 80% of the contiguous US as of July 24, and was considered the worst drought since the 1950s but not yet on the scale of devastation endured during the Dust Bowl of the 1930s.

=== Severe storms ===
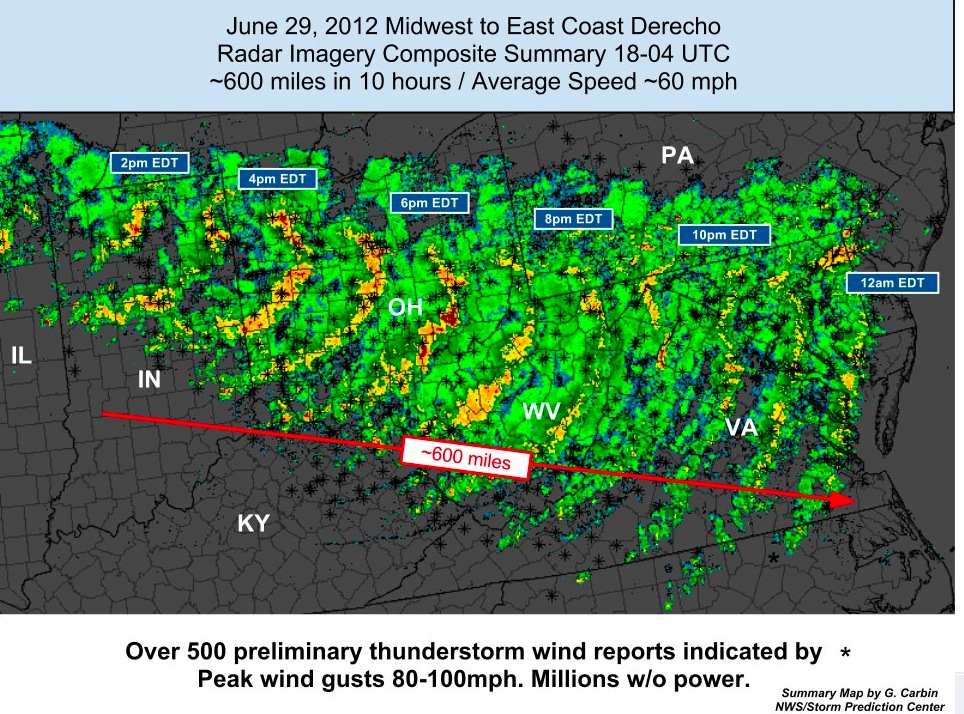
Composite radar image as the June 2012 North American derecho moved from Indiana to Virginia.

On June 29–30, 2012, the heat and humidity from the heat wave caused a small thunderstorm in Iowa to develop into a violent and unprecedented derecho, which tracked across the Midwest and Mid-Atlantic regions of the United States while causing 80 miles per hour (130 km/h) or higher winds, doing hundreds of millions of dollars in damage, and downing trees and power lines, leaving four million people in the eastern U. S. without power.

== See also ==
- 2012 North American drought
- Heat Dome
- June 2012 North American derecho
