= Rader, Missouri =

Unincorporated community in Missouri, U.S.

Coordinates: 37°27′37″N 92°43′09″W

Rader is an unincorporated community in the northeast corner of Webster County, in the Ozarks of southwest Missouri. The community is located on Missouri Route ZZ between Conway to the northwest and Grovespring to the southeast. Rader is on the southern floodplain of the Osage Fork Gasconade River.

== History ==
A post office called Rader was established in 1886, and remained in operation until 1905. The community has the name of the local Rader family.
