= June 2012 North American derecho =

Weather event

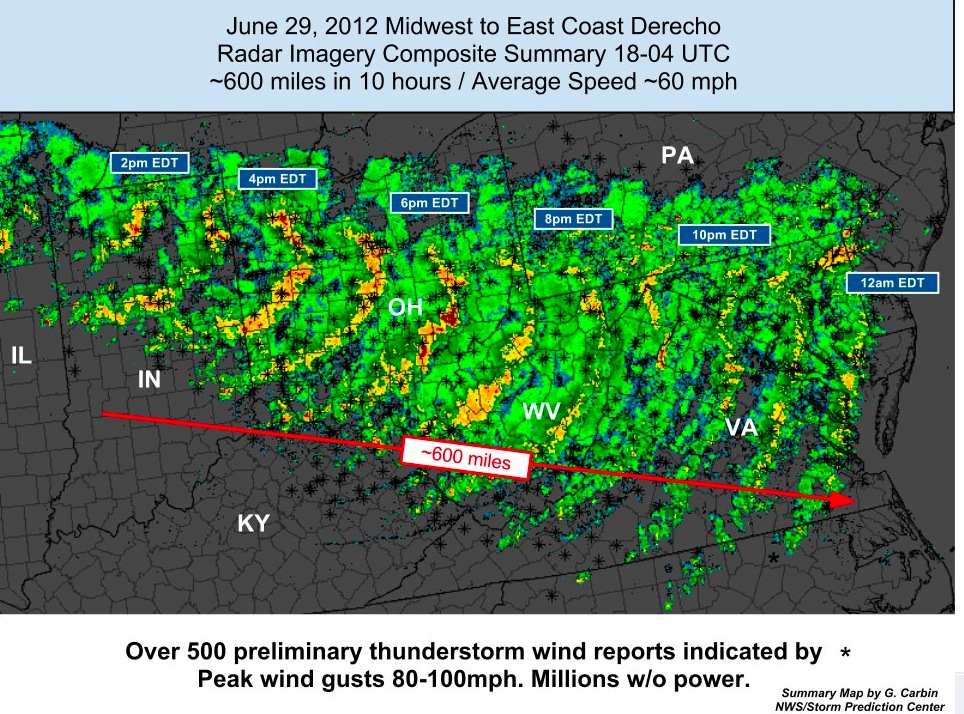
- Composite radar image as the storm moved from Indiana to Virginia
- Date(s): June 29–30, 2012
- Duration: 18 hours (10:00 AM-4:00 AM)
- Track length: 800 mi (1,290 km)
- Peak wind gust (measured): 91 mph (146 km/h; 40.7 m/s) (Fort Wayne, Indiana)
- Largest hail: 2.75 in (7.0 cm) (Bismarck, Illinois)
- Fatalities: 22 total
- Damage costs: $2.9 billion
- Areas affected: United States Midwest, United States Mid-Atlantic

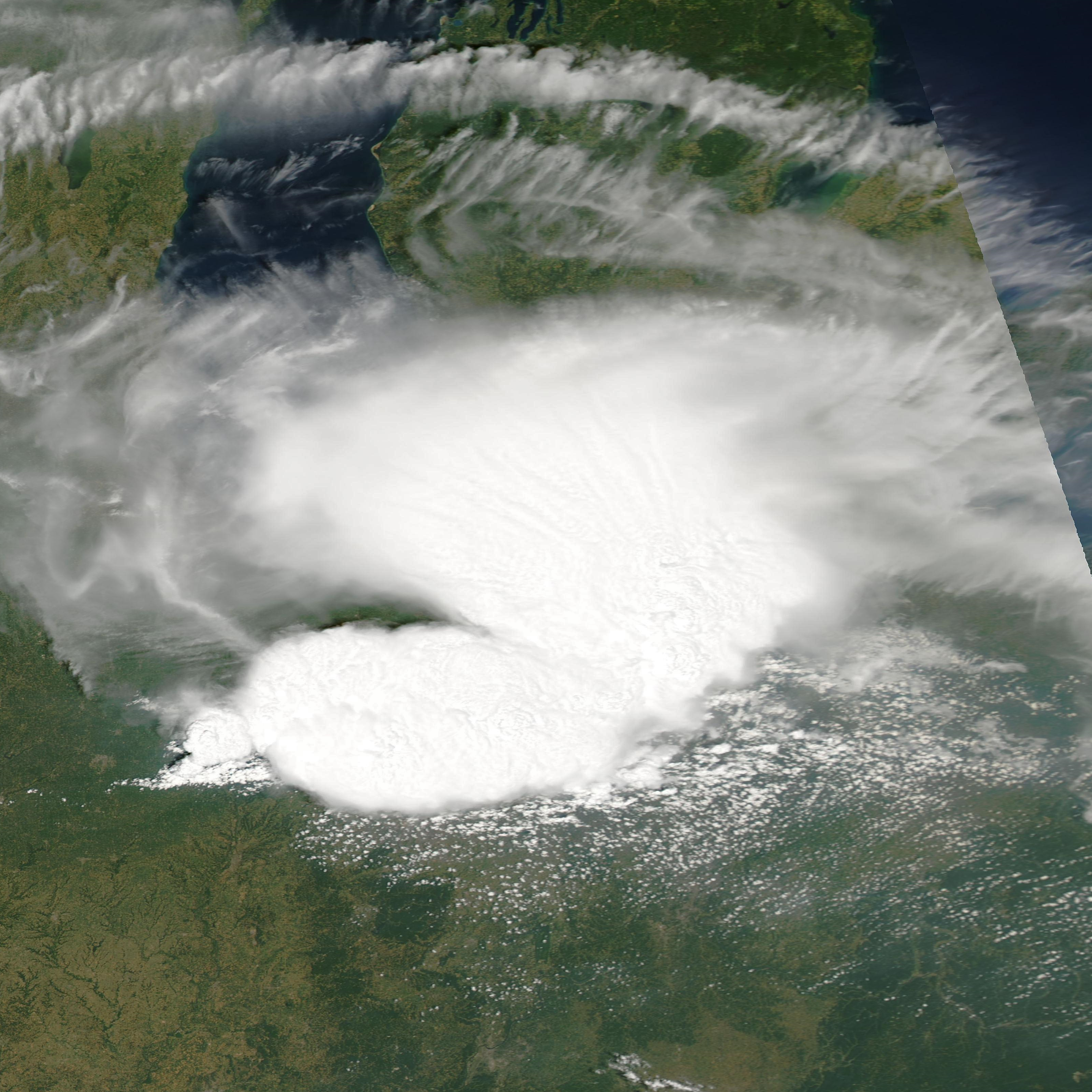
The derecho over Indiana on June 29.

The June 2012 Mid-Atlantic and Midwest derecho was one of the most destructive fast-moving severe thunderstorm complexes in North American history. The progressive derecho tracked across a large section of the Midwestern United States and across the central Appalachians into the mid-Atlantic states on the afternoon and evening of June 29, 2012, and into the early morning of June 30, 2012. It resulted in a total of 22 deaths, millions of power outages across the entire affected region, and a damage total of US$2.9 billion which exceeded that of all other derecho events aside from the August 2020 Midwest derecho (estimated US$11 billion). The storm prompted the issuance of four separate severe thunderstorm watches by the Storm Prediction Center. A second storm in the late afternoon caused another watch to be issued across Iowa and Illinois.

== Storm overview ==
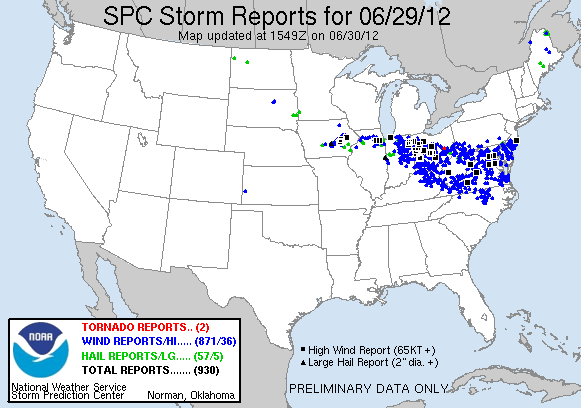
Severe weather reports from the Storm Prediction Center on June 29, most of which were from the derecho

=== Initial stage ===
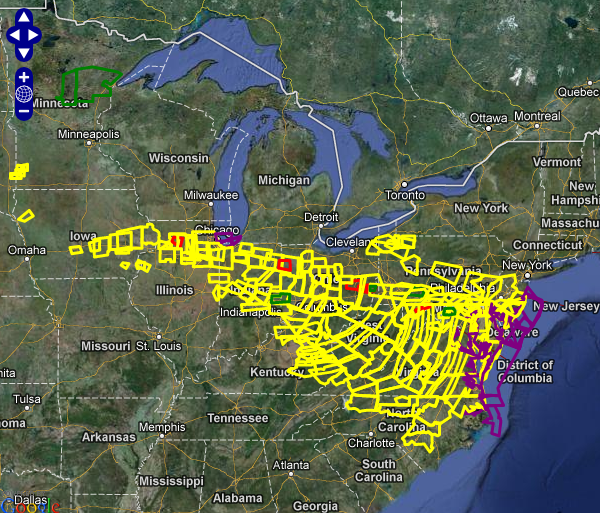
Warnings from the NWS on June 29–30. Red are tornado warnings, yellow are severe thunderstorm warnings, green are flash flood warnings, and purple are special marine warnings.

The storm started as a small thunderstorm cell in central Iowa and continued into Illinois, developing into a mesoscale convective system (MCS) while mostly below severe limits at the time. Due to an extremely hot and highly unstable atmosphere with CAPE values in excess of 5,000 J/kg and temperatures on the south side of a stationary front well in excess of 100°F (37.8°C) prompting widespread excessive heat warnings, the storm complex strengthened and produced isolated instances of severe weather as it crossed over the Chicago metropolitan area late in the morning of June 29 for the Chicago area and much of northern Indiana by early afternoon. The first severe thunderstorm watch of the afternoon was issued at 11:50 a.m. CDT (1650 UTC) just before the storm crossed over Chicago.

=== Gaining of derecho characteristics ===
As the storm tracked eastward into Indiana, it became a derecho and wind gusts increased substantially, peaking as high as 91 mph (147 km/h) in Fort Wayne. By that time, the system had taken on a well-defined bow echo shape, the classic indicator of a derecho. A severe thunderstorm watch, with high wind probabilities (although not a PDS watch) was issued for the majority of Ohio, much of West Virginia, and parts of Indiana and Kentucky at 3:05 p.m. EDT (1905 UTC) as the storm traversed north-central Indiana. Moving southeastward to east-southeastward at about 60 mph (95 km/h)—a speed and trajectory that the derecho maintained for its entire lifespan—it followed the stationary front and increased in size as it entered Ohio in the mid-afternoon hours, affecting a large portion of the state. Since the derecho was clearly underway and expected to last a long time, the SPC increased the threat level to a moderate risk of severe weather at 3:37 p.m. EDT (1937 UTC) across Ohio, West Virginia and small portions of neighboring states, warning of the extreme wind threat. It crossed over the Columbus area at approximately 5:00 p.m. EDT, with winds reported to 82 mph (132 km/h) there, and caused severe damage to the power grid in Franklin, Delaware, and Licking Counties. Winds were reported in excess of 80 mph (128 km/h) at several other locations across the state as well. It maintained its intensity as it reached the Ohio River early in the evening, and the only reported (but unconfirmed) tornado associated with the system occurred in association with the derecho's bookend vortex, and did minimal damage in comparison near Newcomerstown, Ohio, at 6:20 p.m. EDT. As the derecho reached the Ohio-West Virginia border, the SPC issued another severe thunderstorm watch at 6:35 p.m. EDT (2235 UTC), also with high wind probabilities, for the remainder of West Virginia, much of Virginia and Maryland, parts of North Carolina, Kentucky, Pennsylvania, southern New Jersey and the District of Columbia. The derecho crossed the mountains of West Virginia, leaving destruction in its wake, as well as parts of southwestern Pennsylvania and eastern Kentucky through the early evening hours.

=== After sunset ===
Despite the mountainous terrain and loss of daytime heating, the hot, humid air mass and high instability allowed the storms to maintain their high intensity, even though the amount of convective energy decreased slightly (to a still-extreme 3,500 J/kg). They emerged into North Carolina, Virginia and Maryland later in the evening, where an even more unstable air mass awaited with CAPE values as high as 5,500 J/kg. As the derecho failed to weaken over the mountains, the moderate risk was expanded eastward by the SPC at 9:00 p.m. EDT (0100 UTC) into the mid-Atlantic region. At 10:10 p.m., the SPC issued the final severe thunderstorm watch for the derecho for all of Delaware, the remainder of Maryland, the remainder of eastern Virginia, southern New Jersey, the Chesapeake Bay, and the Mid-Atlantic coastal waters. The derecho continued to expand as it crossed the Mid-Atlantic states late in the evening, impacting nearly all of Maryland, Virginia, and Washington, D.C. The most severe winds—reported as high as 87 mph (140 km/h)—were focused in the Baltimore-Washington metropolitan area and southward towards Richmond. Widespread wind gusts over 70 mph (112 km/h), with some significantly higher, were reported across the large and heavily populated region.

=== Overnight at sea and dissipation ===
Damaging winds continued eastward across the Chesapeake Bay towards the Atlantic Ocean, losing little strength despite the cooler marine layer. The derecho emerged into the Atlantic Ocean shortly before 2:00 a.m. EDT (0600 UTC) on June 30, while still producing winds as high as 81 mph (130 km/h) at the coast in Tuckerton, New Jersey and strong and damaging winds on the Delmarva Peninsula. Numerous special marine warnings were issued for the coastal waters of affected states by the NWS as the derecho moved out to sea. The storm dissipated around 4:00 a.m. over the Atlantic south of Long Island, New York.

=== Second complex develops ===
As the derecho moved through Ohio, a second storm developed in Iowa and tracked into northern Illinois. The earlier derecho had used up most of the convective energy in the atmosphere, so this second storm did not become another derecho. Nonetheless, a small MCS with a bow echo developed and became severe as it moved along this track. Its formation prompted the SPC to issue another severe thunderstorm watch, the second of the day for much of the region, for the areas in its path including parts of Iowa and Illinois. However, the storm reached the cold pool left behind by the derecho, and dissipated in the cool, weakly unstable air. Along with its much shorter track, the second storm produced a maximum wind gust of 90 mph (145 km/h) in Marengo, Iowa. This second storm was responsible for the majority of the warnings issued and the damage that was done west of the Chicago area during the event.

== Impacts ==
Damage was widespread and extensive along the entire path of the derecho, especially in northern Indiana and the Fort Wayne metro area, central and western Ohio, northeastern Kentucky, southwestern Pennsylvania, West Virginia, northern, central, and southwestern Virginia, Maryland, Washington, D.C., Delaware and southern New Jersey. In all the mentioned areas, many trees uprooted or snapped, roofs became damaged, tents deployed to sell fireworks leading up to the 4th of July Holiday collapsed, and power outages were extensive, with over 4.2 million customers losing power as a result. An Appalachian Power representative described the power outage as the worst the company had ever seen. In total, 22 people were killed across seven states and the District of Columbia. At least ten of those deaths were in Virginia, all of them due to fallen trees. Two of the deaths were in New Jersey, after two children were killed by falling trees at a campground at Parvin State Park, three deaths were reported in Maryland and one death was reported in Ohio after the storm. As it occurred in the midst of the record Summer 2012 North American heat wave, conditions on following days were problematic, particularly for seniors and vulnerable people. Scattered structural damage also occurred along the path of the derecho, from both falling trees and the winds themselves. Some of the damage included siding was torn off houses, roofs removed from houses, businesses and apartment buildings, mobile homes heavily damaged, barns and garages destroyed and airplanes flipped.

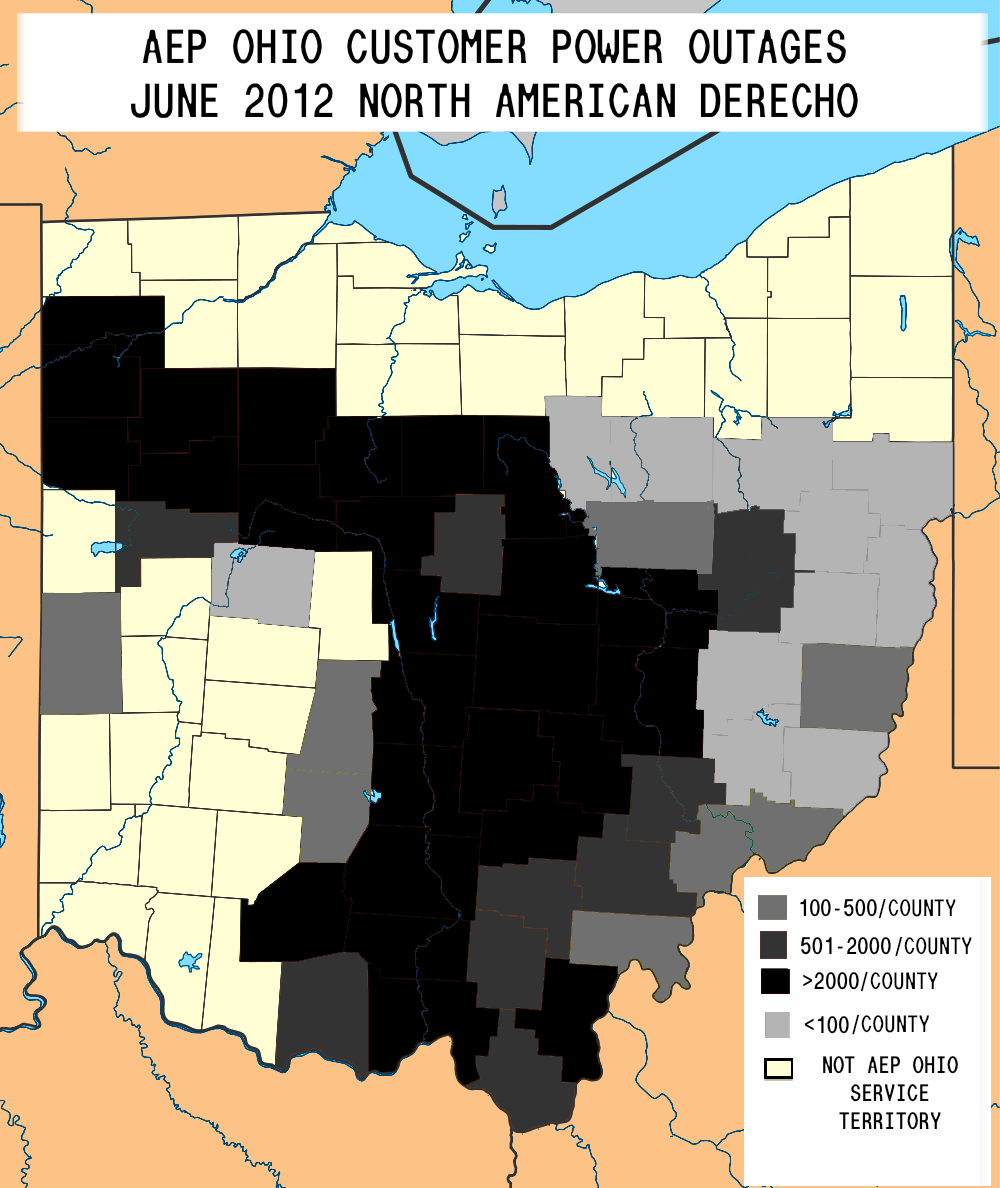
AEP Ohio power outages caused by the derecho

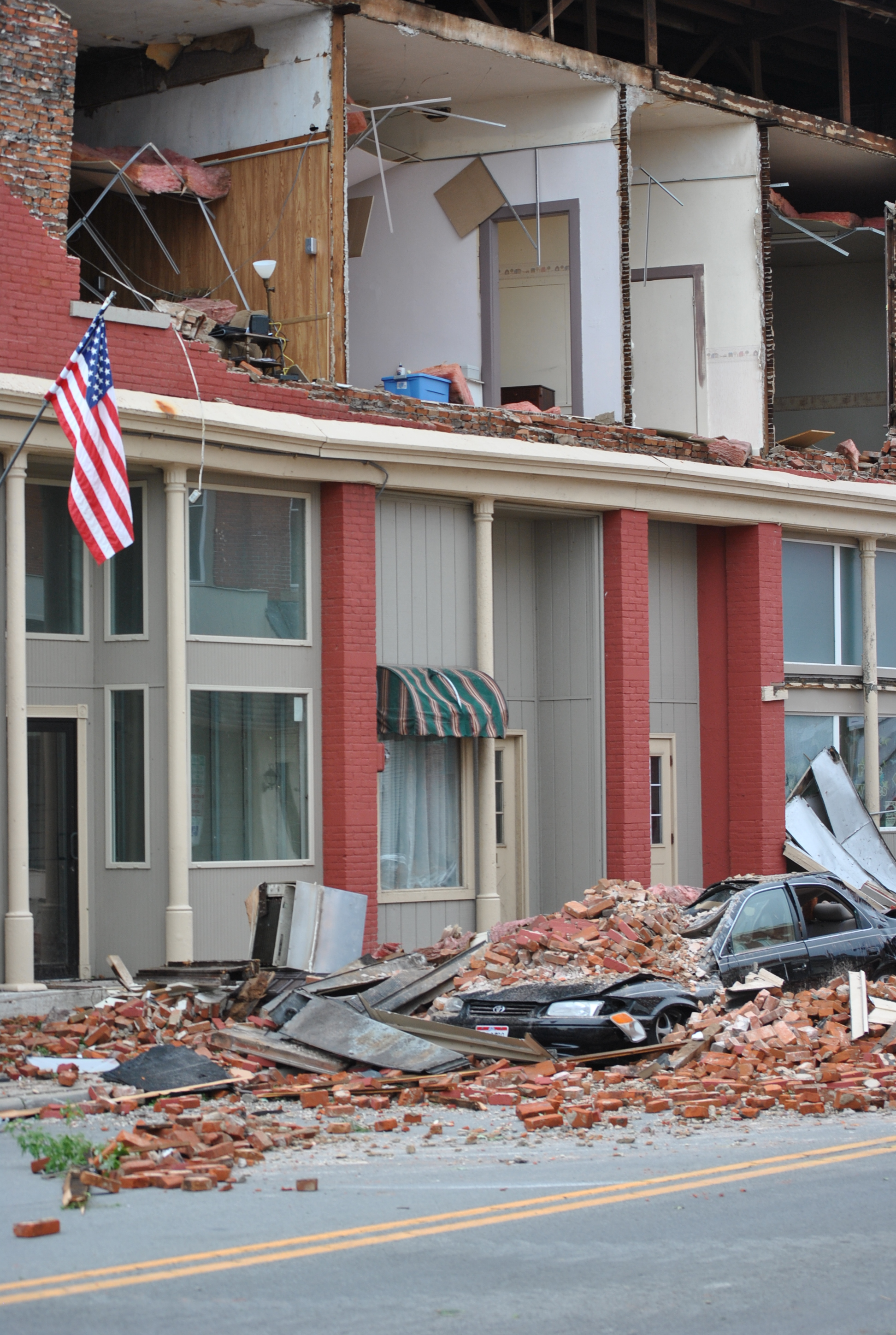
Damage in Columbus Grove, Ohio from the derecho

=== Ohio ===
Over 1 million customers lost power in Ohio, with power outages widespread across roughly two-thirds of the state. Saturday afternoon, Ohio Governor John Kasich declared a state of emergency due to widespread power loss, damages, and the ongoing heat wave. The storm was more damaging to the power grid and more severe in terms of wind gusts than Hurricane Ike, which hit the area in September 2008 with 60 mph (97 km/h) sustained winds and 80 mph (130 km/h) gusts after slightly re-intensifying over Indiana, making it both the largest power outage and the largest power outage not related to a hurricane in AEP Ohio history. Wind gusts with this derecho were closer to 85 mph (137 km/h), and, though of a significantly shorter duration, caused more damage to trees and power lines than Ike. In Bellefontaine, the storm's strength was sufficient to cause severe damage to the tower of the county courthouse, a reinforced sandstone structure. In fact, this derecho was so destructive that Accuweather compared its destruction to that of Hurricane Irene, and The Weather Channel compared it to hurricane damage in general. Many lost power for 5 days, some much longer.

=== West Virginia ===
In West Virginia, about 672,000 customers lost electricity. Governor Earl Ray Tomblin of West Virginia declared a state of emergency after the storm. All but two of the state's 55 counties sustained some damage or loss of power. At peak, more than half of the state's customers were without power. Around 70 high voltage power lines were downed. The derecho's aftermath was arguably more difficult in West Virginia than anywhere else. Power restoration was very slow and outages extremely long, as a result of the sparse and scattered population, mountainous terrain, difficult conditions in extreme heat and need for crews over a large area; in many cases the outages lasted longer than two weeks. The American Red Cross shipped tens of thousands of meals to the state, along with large quantities of water to residents in entire communities that were isolated as a result. It also caused a gas outage in 5 counties.

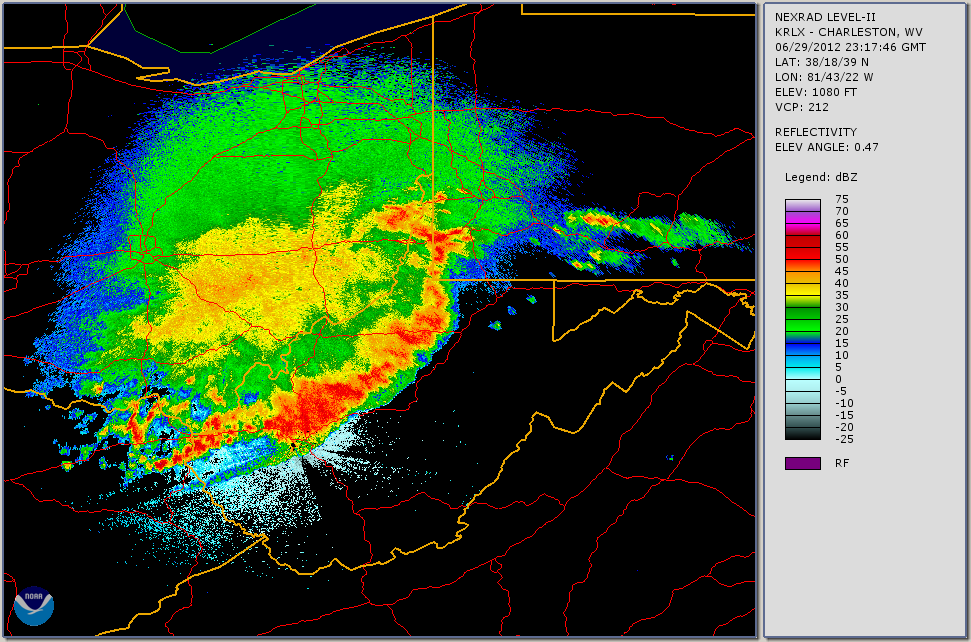
The derecho's bookend vortex near Pittsburgh, Pennsylvania

=== Pennsylvania ===
Across Pennsylvania, 32,500 customers lost power. Storm debris delayed trains at 30th Street Station in Philadelphia.

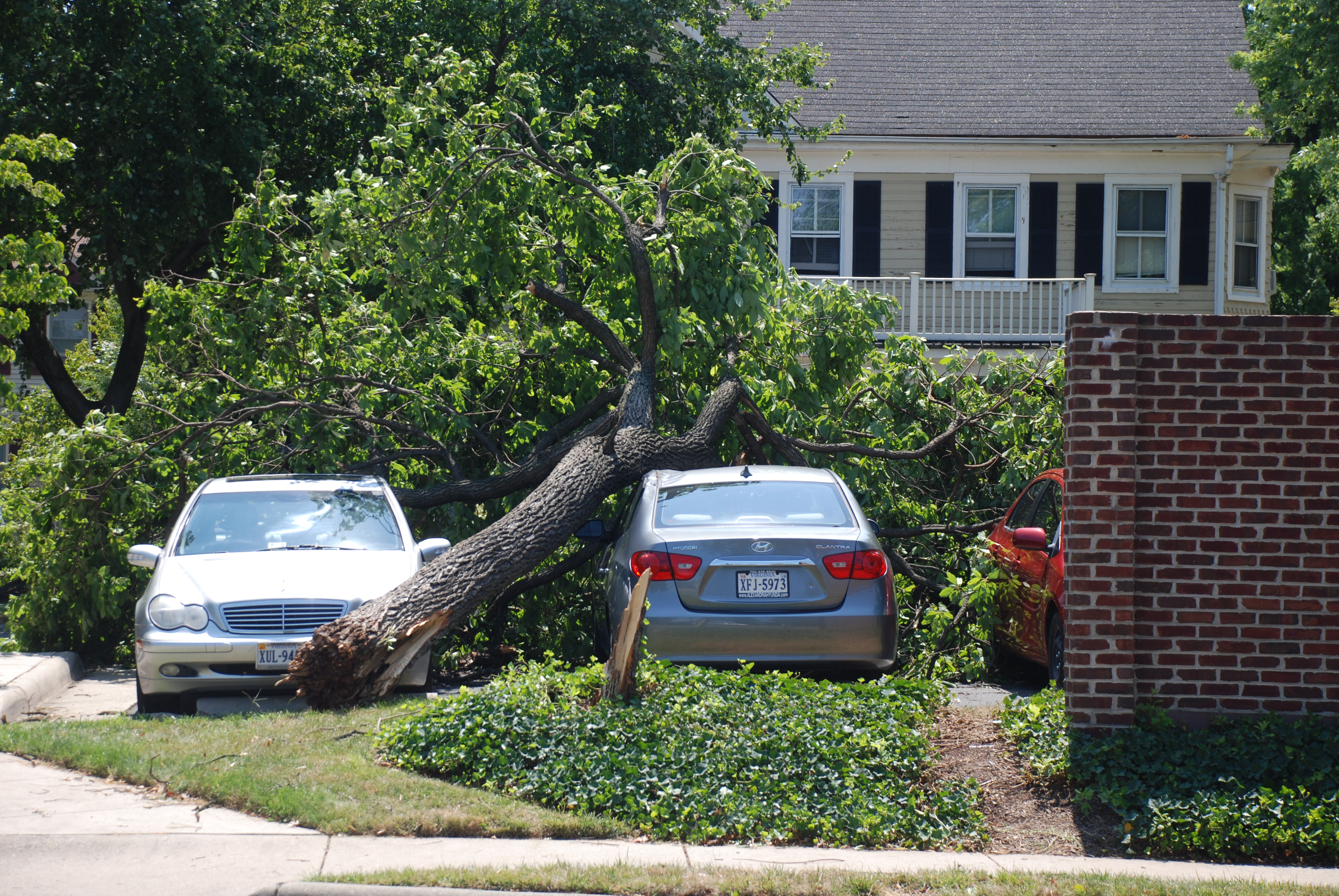
Downed tree in Oakton, Virginia

=== Virginia ===
About 1 million customers lost power in Virginia, which was the largest outage in the state's history not related to a hurricane, and third largest outage including hurricanes, after Hurricane Isabel in 2003 and Hurricane Irene in 2011. The outages also affected an Amazon Elastic Compute Cloud datacenter in Northern Virginia, which caused Instagram, Pinterest, and Netflix to experience significant outages. In Franklin County, Virginia, southeast of Roanoke, a volunteer firefighter was killed by a falling tree while responding to an emergency. Two people in Big Island were killed in a storm-related house fire during the night of June 29 In the Roanoke Valley area, upwards of 65,000 residents in Roanoke, Lynchburg, and Danville lost power. Governor Bob McDonnell of Virginia declared a state of emergency after the storm. 911 emergency service was disrupted for over two million customers in Virginia and West Virginia, with the greatest concentration of outages occurring in Northern Virginia and some customers experiencing 911 outages for several days. These outages were due to telephone switching equipment failing after a disruptive combination of power outages and power surges.

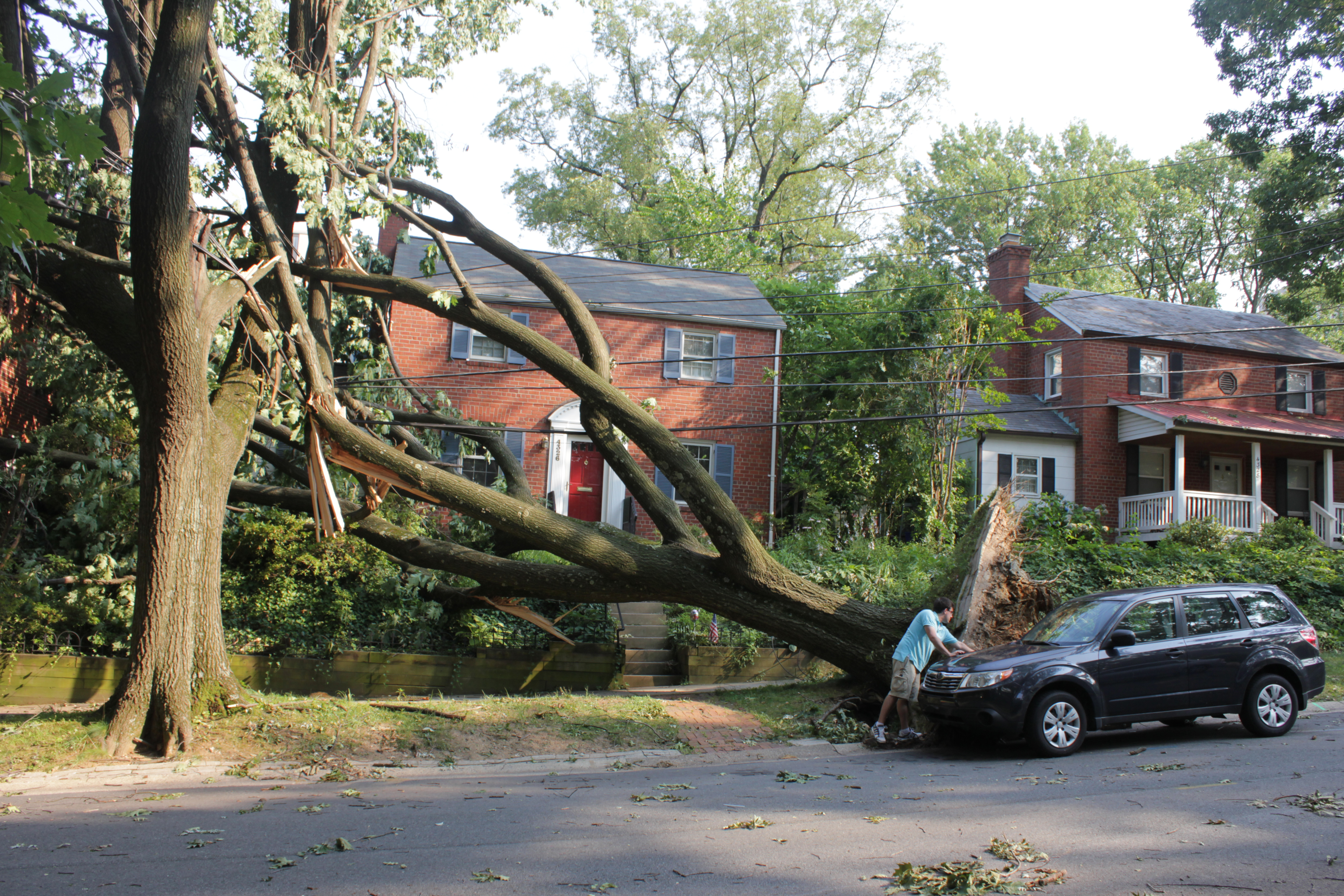
Tree and power lines down in Washington, D.C.

=== Washington, D.C., and Maryland ===
Approximately 68,000 customers were without power in Washington, D.C., and roughly 1,600,000 customers lost power in Maryland, including some in each of the state's counties. Water restrictions were also enacted in Montgomery County and Prince George's County in Maryland after the water supplies in those heavily populated suburban counties lost power. A Washington, D.C., man was electrocuted and his wife critically injured when they went outside to check the damage to their house from a fallen tree. The AT&T National golf tournament at Congressional Country Club was also slowed due to severe tree damage on the course. Governor Martin O'Malley of Maryland declared a state of emergency after the storm. As of July 6, over 4800 tons of storm debris had been collected in Montgomery County, Maryland, with collection ongoing.

In Baltimore (city) and Baltimore County, the widespread damage left large trees uprooted and traffic patterns disrupted. Throughout the Northern Baltimore (city) area neighborhoods experienced disrupted traffic patterns as large trees felled by the storm blocked secondary arterial roadways. Residential damage was heavy throughout the area from aging and weakened large growth trees uprooted during the storm crushing cars and damaging residential roofs. Power outages were widespread, with some neighborhoods north of Northern Parkway waiting up to ten days for full power restoration.

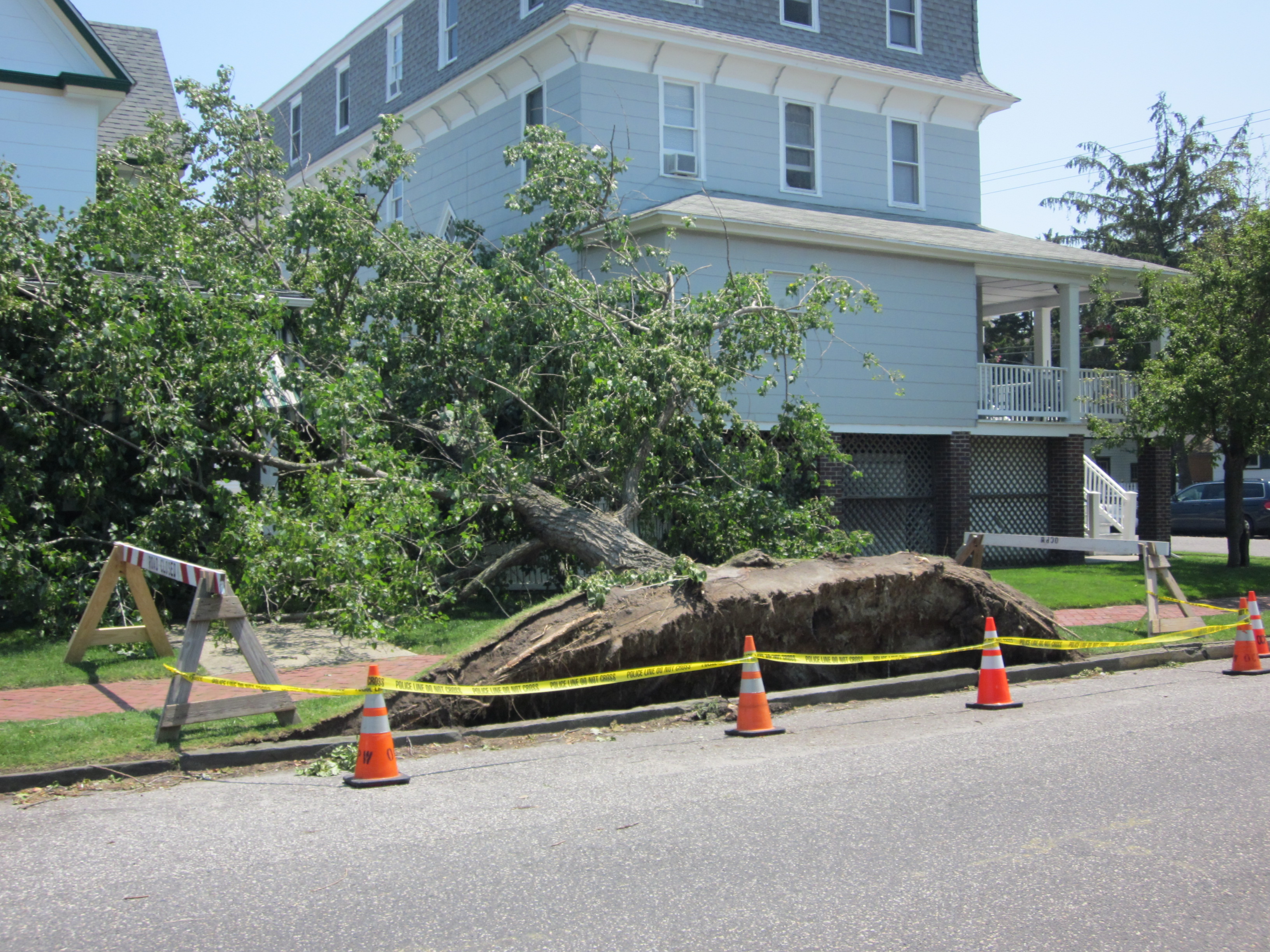
Downed tree in Ocean City, New Jersey

=== New Jersey ===
In South Jersey, Atlantic City Electric reported that 206,000 customers lost power from downed trees. Most of the outages were in Atlantic County, which prompted a county-wide state of emergency. Near Atlantic City, a boater died while trying to bring his vessel ashore. Officials believed that lightning struck a 104-year-old church in Longport and caused a fire that damaged the building. Two boys were killed when a tree fell on their tent in Parvin State Park. In Vineland, damage was preliminarily estimated at $125 million. On July 19, 2012, President Obama declared three counties in New Jersey (Atlantic, Cumberland, and Salem) federal disaster areas. This assured disaster relief through federal assistance to local and state governments and some non-profit organizations.

== See also ==
- Summer 2012 North American heat wave
- 2012 North American drought
- Progressive Derecho
- 1991 West Virginia Derecho
- July 2011 Midwest Derecho
- April 2, 2024 Derecho
- List of derecho events
- Hurricane Ike, another catastrophic power outage in Ohio.
- Hurricanes Irene and Isabel, two other catastrophic power outages on the Mid-Atlantic coast.
