= High Prairie, Missouri =

Unincorporated community in Missouri, U.S.

Coordinates: 37°17′43″N 92°45′55″W

High Prairie is an unincorporated community in Webster County, in the U.S. state of Missouri. The village sits adjacent to the Osage Fork Gasconade River on Missouri Route 38, approximately 4.8 miles west of Duncan.

== History ==
A post office called High Prairie was established in 1872, and remained in operation until 1891. The community was named for a prairie near the original town site.
