= Pease, Missouri =

Unincorporated community in Missouri, U.S.

Coordinates: 37°29′41″N 92°37′58″W

Pease is an unincorporated community in Laclede County, in the Ozarks of southern Missouri. Pease is located along the Osage Fork Gasconade River, just upstream of the Missouri Route J crossing and the confluence of Parks Creek with the Osage Fork.

== History ==
A post office called Pease was established in 1885, and remained in operation until 1921. The community has the name of George Pease, a pioneer citizen.
