= Parks Creek =

Stream in the American state of Missouri

Location
- Country: United States
- State: Missouri
- Region: Wright and Laclede counties

Physical characteristics
- Source
  - coordinates: 37°19′23″N 92°36′39″W
- Mouth
  - coordinates: 37°30′13″N 92°37′27″W
  - elevation: 1,076 ft (328 m)

Parks Creek is a stream in Wright and Laclede counties in the Ozarks of southern Missouri. It is a tributary of the Osage Fork Gasconade River.

Parks Creek begins at the confluence of two valleys south of Grovespring and just west of Missouri Route 5. The stream flows essentially due north parallel to Route 5 and joins the Osage Fork in southern Laclede County just northeast of Pease and the Missouri Route J bridge. In northernmost Wright County the stream flows through the Dr John Alva Fuson Conservation Area. Parks Creek Road follows the stream from Grovespring north to Route J.

Parks Creek has the name of the local Parks family.

== See also ==
- List of rivers of Missouri
