= 1991 West Virginia derecho =

Weather event

Coordinates: 34.8°N 92.2°W

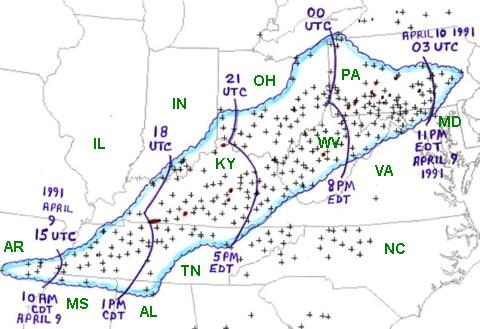
Map of the 1991 West Virginia Derecho (courtesy of NOAA)

The 1991 West Virginia derecho was a serial derecho that started in Arkansas in the early morning hours of April 9, 1991 and made its way northeast, finally dying out over Pennsylvania late that evening.

It was the worst severe weather event for West Virginia since the 1974 Super Outbreak.

== Description ==
Two people were killed and 145 were injured in the event, mainly from falling trees, flying debris, and mobile homes and trailers being overturned. Western and central West Virginia were affected by hail and several roads were blocked.

Most of the destructive damage occurred in Tennessee, Kentucky, West Virginia, western Maryland, and Western Pennsylvania. The fatalities associated with this storm occurred in Charleston, West Virginia and Huntington, West Virginia as a result of the high winds.

== Damage claims ==
In West Virginia alone, there were 8,000 insurance damage claims for homes and businesses. More than 200,000 people lost power in the derecho. Many people experienced flickering lights and power surges. This derecho was the worst severe weather event for West Virginia since the 1974 Super Outbreak.

== See also ==
- List of derecho events
- June 2012 North American derecho
- April 2, 2024 derecho - another significant derecho event in West Virginia that took place in April 33 years later.
