= Morgan, Missouri =

Unincorporated community in Missouri, U.S.

Coordinates: 37°30′37″N 92°40′36″W

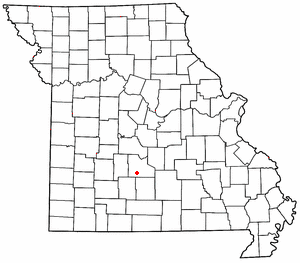

Morgan is an Unincorporated community in southern Laclede County, Missouri, United States. It is located approximately eleven miles south of Lebanon at the intersection of Missouri Supplemental Routes J and PP. Conway is approximately seven miles to the west. The Osage Fork flows past 1.5 miles to the south.

== History ==
A post office at Morgan was established in 1896, and remained in operation until 1975. The community bears the name of Asa Morgan, a local Civil War veteran.
