= Severe thunderstorm outbreak =

Severe thunderstorms over a continuous span of time

A severe thunderstorm outbreak, also called a severe weather outbreak or simply a severe outbreak, is an event in which a weather system or combination of weather systems produces a multitude of severe thunderstorms in a region over a continuous span of time. A severe outbreak which is most notable for its tornadoes is called a tornado outbreak. The four kinds of severe weather produced in these outbreaks are tornadoes, severe wind, large hail, and flash flooding.

== Types ==
=== Tornado outbreak ===
A tornado outbreak is the occurrence of multiple tornadoes in a region over a relatively short span of time. Usually, a tornado outbreak is the result of multiple supercells.

=== Derecho or other squall line ===
A squall line (commonly abbreviated SQLN) is a line of thunderstorms, most or all of which have attained severe limits, traveling in an organized fashion. The greatest threats within a SQLN are damaging winds, large hail, and flash flooding, though tornadoes are possible.

A derecho is a squall line which is long-lived and consistently produces damaging winds across its entire track. Derechos almost exclusively cause flash flooding and wind damage, which can be very severe.

=== Mesoscale convective system ===
A mesoscale convective system is a mesoscale organized system which may produce severe weather along a relatively narrow area or path. The greatest threats in an mesoscale convective system are damaging winds, large hail, and flash flooding, though tornadoes are occasionally possible.

=== Mesoscale convective vortex ===
A mesoscale convective vortex is a tropical cyclone-like, warm core, a feature which may develop in a squall line, derecho, or MCS. Severe MCVs can become what are essentially small tropical storms or hurricanes, and can in fact become such cyclones, as in the case of Hurricane Barry in July 2019. An MCV will often trail a squall line on its south side. The greatest threats in an MCV are (in the center of circulation and south of the center) extreme winds and (north of the center) flash flooding, in addition to tropical cyclone formation.
