= Osage Fork Gasconade River =

Stream in the American state of Missouri

Location
- Country: United States
- State: Missouri
- Region: Wright, Webster and Laclede counties

Physical characteristics
- Source
  - coordinates: 37°15′04″N 92°46′37″W
  - elevation: 1,550 ft (470 m)
- Mouth
  - coordinates: 37°45′02″N 92°26′32″W
  - elevation: 846 ft (258 m)
- Discharge
  - location: Drynob, MO
  - average: 284 cu/ft. per sec.

Basin features
- Tributaries
  - left: Bowen Creek, Salem Springs Creek, Brush Creek, Mill Creek
  - right: Cantrell Creek, Parks Creek, Cobb Creek

The Osage Fork Gasconade River is a stream in Wright, Webster and Laclede counties in the Ozarks of southern Missouri. It is a tributary of the Gasconade River.

The stream headwaters arise in Webster County near the intersection of Missouri routes C and P about seven miles north of Seymour. The stream flows north past High Prairie where it turns to the northwest. It flows under Missouri Route 38 about five miles east of Marshfield and turns to the northeast as it passes under Missouri Route DD. It passes about 3.5 miles east of Niangua and continues to the northeast passing under Missouri Route ZZ just west of Rader to enter Laclede County. It meanders to the southeast and crosses into the northwest corner of Wright County before returning to a northeast direction back into Laclede County adjacent to the community of Pease. It meanders on northeast passing under Missouri Route 5 and then Missouri Route 32 south of Drynob. It meanders north and enters the Gasconade about one mile south of I-44 and 1.5 miles west of the Laclede–Pulaski county line.
