= List of United States tornadoes from January to February 2012 =

Graph of tornadoes in the United States in 2012

In January and February 2012, the local weather forecast offices of the National Weather Service confirmed 134 tornadoes in the United States, indicating an above-average period of tornadic activity. On average, 64 tornadoes occur in the first two months of the year, with 35 occurring in January and 29 in February. (Note: The sampling period for the climatological average of tornadoes in the United States was a 19‑year period from 1991 to 2010.) However, in 2012, the count for the two months was 79 and 55, respectively. The first confirmed tornado in January (and 2012) was an EF0 tornado which struck Fort Bend County in Texas at 1445 UTC on January 9. The last tornado of February was an EF0 that affected Blount County in Tennessee at 0030 UTC on March 1, though in terms of Central Time Zone, where the tornado took place, it was still February 29. The period's strongest tornado was ranked as an EF4 and occurred on February 29 in Saline and Gallatin counties in Illinois. Total economic losses in the United States from the first two months of 2012 amounted to over $600 million.

January 2012 was the third-most active January for tornadoes in the United States since 1950, with 79 tornadoes, behind 1999 and 2008. Two deaths occurred in Alabama on January 23. The activity was the result of a strong La Niña, which contributed to the fourth-warmest January in the United States in recorded history. The unseasonal temperatures led to numerous tornadoes throughout the month, primarily in three tornado outbreaks. The month's largest tornado outbreak occurred from January 25–27, when 27 tornadoes formed across the Southern United States. However, none of these tornadoes exceeded EF1 intensity. A similarly widespread tornado outbreak occurred from January 22–23 and featured 25 tornadoes, of which 10 were classified as significant and thus exceeded EF1 intensity. Throughout the month, tornadoes caused at least $150 million of damage.

February 2012 was slightly less active, with 55 tornadoes, but was still above average. Similar to January, temperatures in the United States were anomalously warm, and the month ranked as the fifteenth-warmest February on record. However, tornadic activity was sparse throughout much of the month, before a large multi-day tornado outbreak took place across the Great Plains and the Ohio River Valley towards the end of the month. The strongest tornado, ranked as an EF4, struck Harrisburg, Illinois on February 29, killing eight. Overall, 15 people were killed during the outbreak, and tornadoes caused $450 million in damages.

== United States yearly total ==
Confirmed tornadoes by Enhanced Fujita rating
EFU	EF0	EF1	EF2	EF3	EF4	EF5	Total
0	583	241	94	26	4	0	939

== January ==
Confirmed tornadoes by Enhanced Fujita rating
EFU	EF0	EF1	EF2	EF3	EF4	EF5	Total
0	40	25	13	1	0	0	79

=== January 9 event ===
List of reported tornadoes – Monday, January 9, 2012
EF#	Location	County	Coord.	Time (UTC)	Path length	Comments/Damage
Texas
EF0	E of Fulshear	Fort Bend	29.67°N 95.81°W	1445	0.1 miles (160 m)	A few trees and power lines were downed and a paddle boat was lifted into a tree. First United States tornado of 2012.
EF1	SE of Clodine	Fort Bend	29.68°N 95.66°W	1505	0.5 miles (0.80 km)	Several houses were damaged, with one suffering significant roof damage and ten others sustaining minor roof damage. Several fences were downed as well.
EF0	NNW of Otey	Brazoria	29.35°N 95.58°W	1715	100 yards (91 m)	Brief tornado damaged a barn and destroyed a shed near Brazos Bend State Park.
EF0	ENE of Chenango	Brazoria	29.27°N 95.44°W	1732	200 yards (180 m)	Brief tornado destroyed a shed and blew the top off a rice dryer.
EF0	SSE of Bonney	Brazoria	29.28°N 95.44°W	1734	500 yards (460 m)	Brief tornado rolled over two semi-trucks on Highway 288.
EF0	SE of Dickinson	Galveston	29.41°N 95.03°W	1855	0.6 miles (0.97 km)	Roof damage occurred at the Mall of the Mainland with one roof collapsing due to a combination of rain and tornadic winds. Trees were downed in the parking lot. A shed was thrown as well.
Sources: SPC Storm Reports for 01/09/12, NWS Houston/Galveston

=== January 11 event ===
List of reported tornadoes – Wednesday, January 11, 2012
EF#	Location	County	Coord.	Time (UTC)	Path length	Comments/Damage
North Carolina
EF2	NW of Ellenboro	Rutherford	35.35°N 81.79°W	2222	3.8 miles (6.1 km)	The tornado was first very weak, peeling siding and roofing off of a shed. As it continued to the northeast on an intermittent path, it caused minor to major damage to site-built homes and completely destroyed two mobile homes. Several outbuildings were destroyed and numerous trees and power lines were downed. Ten people were injured.
EF2	Hildebran area	Burke	35.66°N 81.48°W	2304	4.2 miles (6.8 km)	The tornado initially downed trees and caused minor roof damage to several houses before moving northeast on an intermittent path. It then intensified and damaged dozens of homes, with some mobile homes being completely destroyed and most of the roofing being removed from some frame houses. The tornado then weakened, causing sporadic tree and structural damage before lifting near Interstate 40. One hundred and sixty-eight structures were either damaged or destroyed and eight people were injured.
EF0	SE of Granite Falls	Caldwell	35.76°N 81.38°W	2318	0.1 miles (160 m)	Brief tornado downed trees and flipped several boats and a dock at a marina. The marina itself suffered minor roof damage.
Sources: SPC Storm Reports for 01/11/12, NWS Greenville-Spartanburg, SC

=== January 17 event ===
List of reported tornadoes – Tuesday, January 17, 2012
EF#	Location	County	Coord.	Time (UTC)	Path length	Comments/Damage
Indiana
EF0	SW of Huntingburg	DuBois	38.27°N 86.99°W	1444	0.1 miles (0.16 km)	An outbuilding was destroyed.
EF1	NE of Huntingburg	DuBois	38.35°N 86.89°W	1454	9 miles (14 km)	Numerous outbuildings were destroyed, a grain hopper was knocked over, and dozens of trees were knocked down.
EF0	Madison	Jefferson	38.76°N 85.46°W	1540	0.3 miles (0.48 km)	A large dumpster was moved. A plane and awning were damaged and siding torn from a hangar at Madison Municipal Airport. Several trees were snapped.
EF1	Floyd Knobs	Floyd	38.31°N 85.87°W	1600	1.2 miles (1.9 km)	A garage was destroyed and multiple trees were knocked down.
EF0	NNE of Clarksville	Clark	38.33°N 85.76°W	1606	1.9 miles (3.1 km)	Intermittent tornado overturned a vehicle, knocked down fences, and tore the roof off a barn.
Kentucky
EF1	N of St. Matthews	Jefferson, Oldham	38.28°N 85.64°W	1612	8.2 miles (13.2 km)	Multiple trees were knocked down and homes sustained minor roof damage. The wall of an indoor tennis court and the roof of a barn collapsed. Two semi trailers were blown over, injuring one of the drivers.
EF1	NNW of Fern Creek	Jefferson	38.17°N 85.60°W	1620	0.45 miles (0.72 km)	Brief tornado snapped multiple trees, tore shingles and siding from multiple homes, and blew in the door and lifted the roof of a garage.
EF1	NNE of Midway	Scott	38.20°N 84.66°W	1712	0.45 miles (0.72 km)	Two barns were destroyed and another was damaged. Numerous trees were downed. Some fences were blown down.
EF2	SW of Scottsville	Simpson, Allen	36.70°N 86.47°W	1820	9 miles (14 km)	A well-built brick house lost its roof and another home suffered severe roof damage. Garages, barns, and outbuildings were destroyed. A jeep and camper were blown some distance.
Tennessee
EF0	NNE of Smyrna	Rutherford	36.04°N 86.47°W	1927	1.69 miles (2.72 km)	Dozens of trees were snapped or uprooted. Several homes received moderate roof damage and a camper was blown on its side.
Mississippi
EF2	NE of Sandy Hook	Marion	31.08°N 89.76°W	2202	3 miles (4.8 km)	Two injuries. A well-anchored single wide trailer and a well-built shed were destroyed with the contents tossed into nearby woods. A wood-frame home had damage to one wall and numerous shingles were torn off.
Sources: SPC Storm Reports for 01/17/12, NWS Louisville, KY, NWS Nashville, TN, NWS Jackson, MS

=== January 21 event ===
List of reported tornadoes – Saturday, January 21, 2012
EF#	Location	County	Coord.	Time (UTC)	Path length	Comments/Damage
Georgia
EF1	SSE of Newnan	Coweta	33.31°N 84.76°W	1710	1 mile (1.6 km)	Dozens of large trees were snapped or uprooted. Ten houses received minor damage, primarily as a result of falling trees and debris affecting the roof structures.
EF1	N of Oglethorpe	Macon	32.37°N 84.07°W	2045	8.5 miles (13.7 km)	Two chicken houses were destroyed and another received significant damage. Around five houses received roof damage and one house was completely destroyed.
EF0	NW of Pinehurst	Dooly	32.23°N 83.81°W	2115	5.5 miles (8.9 km)	Several trees were snapped or uprooted and one power pole was downed along a non-continuous damage path.
Sources: SPC Storm Reports for 01/21/12, NWS Peachtree City, GA

=== January 22 event ===
List of reported tornadoes – Sunday, January 22, 2012
EF#	Location	County	Coord.	Time (UTC)	Path length	Comments/Damage
Arkansas
EF2	WSW of Thornton to SW of Rison	Calhoun, Cleveland, Dallas	33.77°N 92.53°W	0114	19.2 miles (30.9 km)	This tornado caused significant damage as it clipped the northwest side of Fordyce, where 11 homes and mobile homes were destroyed, 6 were severely damaged, and 5 had minor damage. The Fordyce Country Club clubhouse building was heavily damaged, and a bathhouse on the property was largely destroyed with much of the debris blown into a nearby swimming pool. Two metal truss towers were crumpled to the ground in the area as well, and several travel trailers were flipped. Near Kingsland, a church was destroyed, a mobile home had its roof torn off, and another mobile home was completely destroyed. Numerous trees were snapped and uprooted along the path.
EF1	SW of Coy	Lonoke	34.52°N 91.89°W	0128	0.75 miles (1.21 km)	An irrigation pivot was flipped and tree limbs were snapped.
EF1	Moscow	Jefferson	34.14°N 91.85°W	0206	3.8 miles (6.1 km)	A shed was thrown over a farm shop in Moscow, which suffered roof damage. An empty fuel tank was thrown into a field and an irrigation pivot was destroyed. Several trees were downed and the foundation of a house was damaged.
EF2	ESE of Sweden to N of Eldridge Corner	Jefferson, Arkansas	34.19°N 91.72°W	0215	16.9 miles (27.2 km)	Near Sweden, a large metal building was severely damaged and had a radio tower collapsed onto it. Farm machinery, grain trucks, and a gas line were damaged. Two irrigation pivots were overturned, several large grain bins were destroyed, and an old house was crushed by a falling tree. Near Eldridge Corner, two mobile homes and a farm equipment building were damaged. Many trees and power poles were downed along the path.
EF2	WNW of De Witt	Arkansas	34.32°N 91.42°W	0236	14.4 miles (23.2 km)	Four metal truss towers were toppled to the ground, and an elevator was blown off of some grain bins. A barn was badly damaged and a travel trailer was overturned. Many trees were downed along the path, and tin was removed from roofs and a tractor shed.
EF1	SW of De Witt	Arkansas	34.17°N 91.34°W	0251	9.4 miles (15.1 km)	A mobile home, a carport, and two sheds were destroyed, while a tractor shed had much of its roof torn off. A house had its windows blown out, and pieces of wood were found wedged into the siding. A metal building was destroyed, and a second metal building had one of its exterior walls pushed in. Trees and power poles were downed along the path.
EF1	S of Ragtown	Monroe, Phillips	34.48°N 91.10°W	0259	8 miles (13 km)	A farm store had several large holes ripped into the sides of the building, and a nearby large shed was thrown over the structure. Irritation pivots were overturned, trees and power poles were downed, grain bins were dented, and tin was ripped off of farm sheds.
Illinois
EF2	SSW of Enfield to ESE of Burnt Prairie	White	38.03°N 88.37°W	0418	18 miles (29 km)	A large barn was destroyed with debris scattered up to 400 yd (370 m) away. Two combines were damaged, and a concrete block garage was destroyed. A 40-foot (12-metre) communications tower was bent approximately halfway up, and a greenhouse was destroyed. Several other small barns and sheds were destroyed, and a house sustained minor damage. Many trees and power poles were snapped along the path.
EF1	SSW of Albion	Edwards	38.34°N 88.08°W	0442	6 miles (9.7 km)	Damage was mainly confined to trees, though a metal high-tension power pole was damaged.
Mississippi
EF2	E of Alligator	Bolivar	34.08°N 90.71°W	0434	3.75 miles (6.04 km)	Eight mobile homes were severely damaged, four of which were destroyed. Several other homes were heavily damaged, grain bins were blown away, and a 200-foot tall radio tower was blown over and mangled. Two metal frame buildings were destroyed, and many trees and power poles were snapped.
EF0	WNW of Marks	Quitman	34.25°N 90.27°W	0500	0.25 miles (0.40 km)	Seven homes sustained minor damage, with shingles and roofing material blown off and windows broken. One home had its garage door blown in.
Kentucky
EF1	Hazel	Calloway	36.50°N 88.26°W	0503	5.6 miles (9.0 km)	Homes sustained damage to their shingles, windows, and shutters. A business in town had its porch roof destroyed. Two garages were leveled, and a third had a section of roof ripped off. Three barns were destroyed, and hundreds of trees were downed, one of which landed on a truck.
EF0	SW of Clifty	Todd	36.99°N 87.18°W	0555	2.5 miles (4.0 km)	Several trees were knocked down and some homes sustained shingle damage. A garage had its roof blown off, and a barn and several greenhouses were damaged. A camper trailer was overturned and destroyed, and a pool was damaged, along with a grain bin.
Tennessee
EF1	S of Lexington	Henderson	35.58°N 88.39°W	0558	8 miles (13 km)	Numerous trees were uprooted and snapped. A house lost part of its roof and a shed was destroyed.
Sources: SPC Storm Reports for 01/22/12, NWS Little Rock, NWS Jackson, MS, NWS Paducah, KY, NWS Memphis, TN

=== January 23 event ===
List of reported tornadoes – Monday, January 23, 2012
EF#	Location	County	Coord.	Time (UTC)	Path length	Comments/Damage
Alabama
EF0	SE of Panola	Sumter	32.9287°N 88.2364°W	0836	0.36 miles (0.58 km)	One home suffered roof damage and another suffered minor siding damage.
EF2	Koffman	Tuscaloosa	33.33°N 87.65°W	0842	0.45 miles (720 m)	Brief but strong tornado struck the rural community of Koffman. A house had its roof ripped off, a barn and an outbuilding were destroyed, and many trees were snapped.
EF2	E of Windham Springs	Tuscaloosa	33.40°N 87.40°W	0900	0.56 miles (900 m)	Three wooden H-frame transmission poles were snapped, along with multiple trees. A hunting camp was severely impacted with eight camper trailers rolled, three of which were destroyed.
EF2	NW of Rock Creek	Tuscaloosa, Jefferson	33.43°N 87.31°W	0909	13 miles (21 km)	1 death – 50 homes and mobile homes were damaged or destroyed in the Toadvine area as a result of this high-end EF2 tornado. Numerous trees were snapped and uprooted along the path. The fatality occurred when a manufactured home was completely destroyed.
EF0	NE of Livingston	Sumter	32.66°N 88.17°W	0921	1.1 miles (1.8 km)	Numerous trees and a shed were damaged.
EF3	NE of Tarrant to NE of Argo	Jefferson, St. Clair	33.70°N 86.80°W	0958	15.5 miles (24.9 km)	1 death – See article on this tornado. 75 people were injured.
EF1	N of Marion	Perry	32.71°N 87.31°W	1033	2.1 miles (3.4 km)	Many trees were uprooted and snapped.
EF2	NE of Marion to N of Clanton	Perry, Chilton	32.72°N 87.27°W	1037	39.5 miles (63.6 km)	This strong, long-track tornado first caused major structural damage to a church and snapped or uprooted thousands of trees in the Talladega National Forest. The tornado then struck the town of Maplesville, causing significant damage. 36 homes in Maplesville were heavily damaged or destroyed, and 40 others sustained minor damage. Several businesses sustained damage as well. Continuing to the northeast, the tornado destroyed a business, collapsed a radio tower, damaged ten manufactured homes, and destroyed five other manufactured homes. Numerous trees were downed towards the end of the path before the tornado dissipated, some of which landed on homes.
EF0	ENE of Childersburg	Talladega	33.30°N 86.30°W	1135	5.4 miles (8.7 km)	A number of trees were uprooted and snapped.
EF1	S of Clanton	Chilton	32.73°N 86.63°W	1236	3.67 miles (5.91 km)	Several manufactured homes sustained minor damage, and one was destroyed. Ten other frame homes were damaged as well, one of which was completely shifted off of its foundation. Another home was shifted to a lesser degree, while a third had most of its roof blown off. Several outbuildings were destroyed, and many trees were downed along the path.
EF1	N of Millbrook	Elmore	32.52°N 86.41°W	1348	4.02 miles (6.47 km)	60 homes sustained minor roof and siding damage, an auto shop sustained damage to its garage doors, and an apartment building had its metal roof removed. Multiple trees were downed as well.
Sources: NWS Birmingham

=== January 24 event ===
List of reported tornadoes – Tuesday, January 24, 2012
EF#	Location	County	Coord.	Time (UTC)	Path length	Comments/Damage
Texas
EF0	WNW of Rocksprings	Edwards	30.07°N 100.40°W	0530	3 miles (4.8 km)	A few trees were downed on a ranch.
Sources: SPC Storm Reports for 01/24/12, NCDC Storm Events Database

=== January 25 event ===
List of reported tornadoes – Wednesday, January 25, 2012
EF#	Location	County	Coord.	Time (UTC)	Path Length	Comments/Damage
Texas
EF1	Northeast Austin	Travis	30.32°N 97.65°W	0858	1.14 miles (1.83 km)	Several homes were badly damaged with one losing part of its roof, trees were snapped and an industrial building was destroyed and several others suffered roof damage.
EF0	Southwest San Antonio	Bexar	29.45°N 98.66°W	1015	0.27 miles (0.43 km)	A carport was thrown into a home causing major damage. Several other homes lost shingles. Trees were damaged and loose items were thrown.
EF0	String Prairie area	Bastrop	29.85°N 97.34°W	1130	2.9 miles (4.7 km)	Many trees were downed and a house suffered minor damage.
EF1	SSW of Caldwell	Burleson	30.43°N 96.76°W	1243	2.25 miles (3.62 km)	Several trees were snapped or uprooted and a house was pushed off its foundation. Several sheds and barns were destroyed.
EF0	Brenham area	Washington	30.16°N 96.40°W	1317	2.5 miles (4.0 km)	Several small outbuildings were destroyed, a barn lost its roof, and a house suffered roof damage. Numerous trees were downed.
EF0	SSW of Madisonville	Madison	30.87°N 95.96°W	1400	0.33 miles (0.53 km)	Several trees were snapped or uprooted and a few structures were damaged.
EF0	Huntsville area (1st Tornado)	Walker	30.71°N 95.55°W	1506	0.36 miles (0.58 km)	Tornado touched down at a car dealership. An awning was flipped, damaging two cars.
EF0	Huntsville area (2nd Tornado)	Walker	30.71°N 95.55°W	1510	50 yards (46 m)	Very brief tornado downed several trees. Some trees landed on homes.
EF1	WSW of Mount Enterprise	Rusk	31.90°N 94.70°W	1632	1.5 miles (2.4 km)	Several large trees were snapped or uprooted. A few structures were damaged. One person was injured.
EF0	NE of Mount Enterprise	Rusk, Panola	32.02°N 94.61°W	1647	6.5 miles (10.5 km)	Several trees were snapped or uprooted and a few buildings were damaged.
EF0	Pearland	Brazoria	29.56°N 95.28°W	1805	200 yards (180 m)	The awning was destroyed at a gas station and a business lost its roof.
EF0	S of Wilwood	Hardin	30.46°N 94.43°W)	1805	3 miles (4.8 km)	Narrow tornado downed several trees.
EF0	NNW of Caney Head	Tyler	30.46°N 94.43°W	1830	0.4 miles (0.64 km)	Several trees were downed, a carport was damaged, and a shed lost part of its roof.
EF1	Kirbyville area	Jasper	30.65°N 93.92°W	1900	1.6 miles (2.6 km)	Several buildings were damaged in Kirbyville.
EF0	NNE of Magnolia Springs	Jasper	30.75°N 94.02°W	1902	0.8 miles (1.3 km)	Narrow tornado downed several trees.
Louisiana
EF0	SSE of Toledo Bend Reservoir	Vernon	31.10°N 93.54°W	1935	3 miles (4.8 km)	Tornado downed several trees.
EF0	SSW of Peason	Sabine	31.41°N 93.28°W	2005	2.3 miles (3.7 km)	Numerous trees had branches snapped off and a few buildings were damaged.
EF0	SSE of Fort Polk	Vernon	31.00°N 93.19°W	2030	1 mile (1.6 km)	Many trees were downed.
EF0	SW of Boyce	Vernon	31.33°N 92.72°W	2113	0.8 miles (1.3 km)	Many trees were downed.
EF0	E of Hineston	Rapides	31.14°N 92.73°W	2135	1.5 miles (2.4 km)	Several trees snapped or uprooted.
EF0	SW of Kolin	Rapides	31.27°N 92.33°W	2206	1.5 miles (2.4 km)	Several trees snapped or uprooted and one home sustained roof damage.
EF1	Westlake area	Calcasieu	30.25°N 93.26°W	2245	5.7 miles (9.2 km)	Several homes damaged by fallen trees.
EF0	ESE of Grand Chenier	Cameron	29.72°N 92.76°W	0021	250 yards (230 m)	A home lost its carport and part of its roof.
EF0	E of Duson	Lafayette	30.23°N 92.14°W	0158	260 yards (240 m)	Trees were downed and two mobile homes suffered major damage.
Mississippi
EF1	SW of Rockport	Copiah	31.74°N 90.22°W	0049	3.5 miles (5.6 km)	Trees were uprooted and snapped. A barn suffered roof damage.
Sources: SPC Storm Reports for 01/25/12, NWS Austin/San Antonio, NWS Houston/Galveston, NWS Shreveport, LA, NWS Lake Charles, LA, NWS Jackson, MS

=== January 26 event ===
List of reported tornadoes – Thursday, January 26, 2012
EF#	Location	County	Coord.	Time (UTC)	Path Length	Comments/Damage
Mississippi
EF0	N of Poplarville	Pearl River	30.99°N 89.56°W	1244	200 yards (180 m)	Brief tornado peeled back a patio roof and ripped off part of the roof of a house. At least one other house was damaged.
Louisiana
EF0	NE of Venice	Plaquemines	29.30°N 89.38°W	1325	400 yards (370 m)	Brief tornado damaged a few homes and trees.
Alabama
EF0	N of Aquilla	Choctaw	31.76°N 88.42°W	1535	0.37 miles (0.60 km)	The weak tornado skipped along County Road 45, damaging trees. The tornado also passed near several homes without damaging them.
EF0	SE of Uniontown	Perry	30.99°N 89.56°W	1700	0.6 miles (0.97 km)	A number of trees were uprooted and others had large branches broken. Several homes suffered roof and siding damage and one home was shifted off its foundation.
Sources: SPC Storm Reports for 01/26/12, NWS New Orleans/Baton Rouge, NWS Birmingham, Experimental NWS damage survey viewer

=== January 27 event ===
List of reported tornadoes – Friday, January 27, 2012
EF#	Location	County	Coord.	Time (UTC)	Path Length	Comments/Damage
Florida
EF1	ENE of Port Charlotte	Charlotte	27.00°N 82.02°W	1045	0.75 miles (1.21 km)	A home and apartment complex suffered significant roof damage. A convenience store suffered minor damage. Damage occurred along and intermittent path.
Sources: SPC Storm Reports for 01/26/12, NWS Tampa Bay

== February ==
Confirmed tornadoes by Enhanced Fujita rating
EFU	EF0	EF1	EF2	EF3	EF4	EF5	Total
0	16	18	19	1	1	0	55

=== February 1 event ===
List of reported tornadoes – Wednesday, February 1, 2012
EF#	Location	County	Coord.	Time (UTC)	Path length	Comments/Damage
Louisiana
EF0	NW of Oberlin	Allen	30.64°N 92.83°W	0630	3.75 miles (6.04 km)	Weak tornado downed about a dozen pine trees and peeled the roof off of a barn.
Mississippi
EF0	SE of Splunge	Monroe	33.95°N 88.24°W	0212	200 yards (180 m)	Brief tornado damaged a home, collapsing its carport. A mobile home was damaged when a shed was thrown into it and destroyed. A chicken coop was destroyed and several trees were snapped.
Sources: SPC Storm Reports for 02/01/12, NWS Memphis, NCDC Storm Events Database

=== February 3 event ===
List of reported tornadoes – Friday, February 3, 2012
EF#	Location	County	Coord.	Time (UTC)	Path length	Comments/Damage
Texas
EF1	SSW of Miami	Gray, Roberts, Hemphill	35.55°N 100.70°W	0642	13 miles (21 km)	Tornado caused sporadic damage along a 13-mile (21-kilometre) path. Several irrigation pivots were blown over, a warehouse collapsed, a horse barn was damaged and several power poles were snapped.
EF1	Snook area	Burleson	30.49°N 96.47°W	0045	0.8 miles (1.3 km)	Tornado destroyed several barns and sheds. Numerous homes were damaged and trees were snapped or uprooted.
EF2	NE of Snook	Burleson	30.51°N 96.44°W	0050	0.5 miles (800 m)	Strong tornado struck a FedEx building, damaging the roof. Several tractor trailers were tossed 50 to 100 yd (46 to 91 m).
Sources: SPC Storm Reports for 02/02/12. SPC Storm Reports for 02/03/12, NWS Amarillo, Texas, NWS Houston / Galveston

=== February 4 event ===
List of reported tornadoes – Saturday, February 4, 2012
EF#	Location	County	Coord.	Time (UTC)	Path length	Comments/Damage
Louisiana
EF1	SW of De Ridder	Beauregard	30.80°N 93.34°W	1400	4.6 miles (7.4 km)	Tornado caused significant damage to a barn, tossing its roof roughly 0.4 mi (0.64 km). Several trees and a carport were also damaged.
Sources: SPC Storm Reports for 02/04/12, NWS Lake Charles, Louisiana

=== February 18 event ===
List of reported tornadoes – Saturday, February 18, 2012
EF#	Location	County	Coord.	Time (UTC)	Path length	Comments/Damage
Louisiana
EF0	W of Gueydan	Cameron, Vermillion	30.03°N 92.62°W	1453	2.45 miles (3.94 km)	A few trees and power poles were downed and the roof was peeled off of a barn.
Sources: SPC Storm Reports for 02/18/12, NCDC Storm Events Database

=== February 22 event ===
List of reported tornadoes – Wednesday, February 22, 2012
EF#	Location	County	Coord.	Time (UTC)	Path length	Comments/Damage
Georgia
EF1	E of Rome	Floyd	34.25°N 85.14°W	0312	3.25 miles (5.23 km)	Trees were uprooted and snapped. One store lost part of its roof and a mobile home lost all of its roof. Several outbuildings were destroyed. One indirect fatality occurred when a woman suffered a heart attack.
Sources: SPC Storm Reports for 02/22/12, NWS Peachtree City, GA

=== February 24 event ===
List of reported tornadoes – Friday, February 24, 2012
EF#	Location	County	Coord.	Time (UTC)	Path length	Comments/Damage
South Carolina
EF2	N of Wagener	Aiken, Lexington	33.72°N 81.35°W	1807	8 miles (13 km)	One mobile home was destroyed and a two-story home sustained extensive damage. Another two-story home was also damaged. Debris was reported to be covering roads. Numerous trees were downed, with several snapped off.
EF0	WSW of Pinewood	Sumter	33.71°N 80.56°W	1851	5 miles (8.0 km)	Damage was confined to trees along an intermittent path.
EF1	SE of Islandton	Colleton	32.88°N 80.89°W	2209	2 miles (3.2 km)	Several structures were damaged or destroyed. Three mobile homes suffered roof damage. At least 30 trees were uprooted or snapped.
Georgia
EF0	ESE of Omega	Colquitt	31.31°N 83.54°W	1845	3 miles (4.8 km)	Numerous trees were snapped, along with damage to barns, irrigation pivots, and some roof damage to a home. A mobile home park was damaged, with one home completely destroyed.
Virginia
EF0	Bavon	Mathews	37.33°N 76.29°W	2325	1 mile (1.6 km)	Several houses and businesses were damaged and several trees were downed.
Sources: SPC Storm Reports for 02/24/12, NWS Columbia, SC, NWS Charleston, SC, NWS Tallahassee, NWS Wakefield, VA

=== February 28 event ===
List of reported tornadoes – Tuesday, February 28, 2012
EF#	Location	County	Coord.	Time (UTC)	Path length	Comments/Damage
Nebraska
EF0	NE of North Platte	Lincoln, Logan	41.35°N 100.49°W	2213	3 miles (4.8 km)	Tornado was reported by an off-duty NWS employee and remained primarily over open fields, though scattered tree damage occurred and an irrigation pivot was also damaged. This was the first tornado to be reported in Nebraska in February since records began in 1950.
EF0	W of Greeley	Greeley	41.55°N 98.61°W	0100	Unknown	Very brief tornado in a field flipped and destroyed an irrigation pivot.
Kansas
EF0	SE of Randall	Jewell, Cloud	39.59°N 97.98°W	2328	4.8 miles (7.7 km)	Tornado struck a farm, damaging trees and tearing off the metal roof of an outbuilding. A small metal building was destroyed, a barn sustained roof damage, and water tanks were thrown. Cars were damaged by flying debris and power poles were broken.
EF0	Southeastern Belleville	Republic	39.79°N 97.68°W	0005	6.1 miles (9.8 km)	This weak tornado clipped the southeast side of Belleville. A few residences sustained minor damage in and around town, and many trees were downed at the Belleville Country Club. A few outbuildings were damaged outside of town as well.
EF0	SSW of Hutchinson	Reno	37.99°N 97.96°W	0043	1.2 miles (1.9 km)	Tornado destroyed a barn, downed a fence, and overturned a pickup truck and a stock trailer. A few trees were downed and a house sustained porch damage.
EF0	S of Hutchinson	Reno	37.94°N 98.00°W	0047	0.75 miles (1.21 km)	Brief tornado remained over an open field and caused no damage.
EF0	SE of Moundridge	McPherson	38.18°N 97.51°W	0117	2.3 miles (3.7 km)	Several trees and power lines were downed, and highway signs were twisted.
EF2	Harveyville	Wabaunsee	38.79°N 95.96°W	0302	5 miles (8.0 km)	1 death – This high-end EF2 tornado heavily damaged or destroyed many homes and other structures in Harveyville. A church was completely destroyed, and an apartment complex sustained major damage. Many trees and power poles were snapped throughout town, and vehicles were flipped. Almost every structure in Harveyville sustained some form of damage, and one man was fatally injured in his home. 12 other people were also injured. The tornado formed and dissipated so quickly, within three to five minutes, that no tornado warning was issued.
EF1	S of Globe	Franklin, Douglas	38.73°N 95.40°W	0406	3.5 miles (5.6 km)	Outbuildings and grain bins were destroyed, an RV trailer was overturned, and residences sustained some damage.
Missouri
EF1	WNW of Nashville to WNW of Lamar	Barton	37.39°N 94.56°W	0452	16 miles (26 km)	Five barns were damaged, along with the roofs of a farmhouse and a garage. Numerous trees were snapped or uprooted along the path.
EF1	NNW of Greenfield to SE of Aldrich	Dade, Polk	37.46°N 93.86°W	0526	18.6 miles (29.9 km)	Tornado damaged or destroyed ten barns, and inflicted roof damage to two homes along its path.
EF2	E of Schofield to SE of Buffalo	Polk, Dallas	37.55°N 93.19°W	0558	10 miles (16 km)	1 death – This tornado caused extensive damage near Buffalo. A mobile home park in that area was severely impacted, with mobile homes destroyed and one fatality occurring at that location. Two frame homes and three turkey barns were significantly damaged, and many trees and power poles were downed along the path. 12 people were injured.
Sources: SPC Storm Reports for 02/28/12, NWS North Platte, NWS Hastings, NE, NWS Topeka, NWS Wichita, NWS Springfield, MO, NCDC Storm Events Database

=== February 29 event ===
List of reported tornadoes – Wednesday, February 29, 2012
EF#	Location	County	Coord.	Time (UTC)	Path length	Comments/Damage
Missouri
EF1	NW of Phillipsburg to Southern Lebanon	Laclede	37.57°N 92.81°W	0618	11 miles (18 km)	Tornado damaged structures along its path, mainly in the southern part of Lebanon. Several homes and a boat plant sustained roof damage, and a Lowe's garden center was severely damaged. Several other businesses were also damaged, a mobile home was destroyed, and many trees were downed along the path. Five people were injured.
EF1	SE of Bennett Spring	Laclede	37.72°N 92.84°W	0622	0.25 miles (0.40 km)	Tornado struck a campground, damaging or destroying at least 20 RV campers. Numerous trees and a pole barn were damaged. An antique shop and two homes sustained minor roof damage as well.
EF2	NW of Cassville	Barry	36.70°N 93.92°W	0642	1.7 miles (2.7 km)	1 death – Four mobile homes and one frame home were destroyed near Cassville. Another frame home was significantly damaged, and a tractor trailer was flipped. The fatality occurred when an elderly man was killed in the destruction of his mobile home. Four others were injured.
EF1	NW of Edgar Springs to NE of Lake Spring	Phelps, Dent	37.71°N 91.88°W	0706	19 miles (31 km)	The damage from this tornado was limited to downed trees as it impacted heavily forested areas along its path.
EF2	Kimberling City to S of Kissee Mills	Stone, Taney	36.64°N 93.22°W	0713	22 miles (35 km)	47 injures – See article on this tornado – 47 people were injured after this strong, EF2-rated tornado struck Kimberling City and Branson.
EF2	W of Jewett to ESE of Sedgewickville	Madison, Bollinger	37.45°N 90.12°W	0910	20.75 miles (33.39 km)	Barns and homes sustained roof damage along the path, and one small and poorly constructed home was completely destroyed and swept from its foundation with debris strewn in all directions. A mobile home was flipped onto its roof, and a businesses had half of its roof torn off. Numerous large trees were snapped and uprooted along the path, and many power poles were downed as well. One person was injured.
EF2	ENE of Mayfield	Bollinger, Cape Girardeau	37.47°N 89.86°W	0934	7.65 miles (12.31 km)	Multiple-vortex tornado damaged three frame homes. Each home had a majority of its windows blown out, including one that part of its roof torn off. One of these homes had its attached garage lifted and tossed 100 yards (91 m) downwind. Two mobile homes had their roofs partially ripped off, large trees were snapped and uprooted, and outbuildings were destroyed as well.
EF2	Oak Ridge to SE of Makanda, Illinois	Cape Girardeau, Union (IL), Jackson (IL)	37.50°N 89.73°W	0947	32 miles (51 km)	This long-track multiple-vortex tornado first touched down in Oak Ridge, where homes sustained primarily partial roof loss. Additional homes sustained similar damage near Pocahontas. The tornado crossed into Illinois, where several homes were damaged in the town of Alto Pass before it dissipated near Makanda. Thousands of trees were snapped and uprooted along the path, power lines were downed, and many barns and grain bins were destroyed.
EF3	W of Asherville to W of Bell City	Stoddard	36.90°N 90.21°W	1000	21 miles (34 km)	1 death – Barns, outbuildings, and mobile homes were destroyed along the path, with a fatality occurring in one of the mobile homes. A frame home was destroyed, while another was severely damaged. Several other frame homes sustained minor damage, and a total of 50 structures were damaged or destroyed along the path.
EF1	E of Bell City to SE of Benton	Stoddard, Scott	37.02°N 89.80°W	1024	17.5 miles (28.2 km)	Grain bins and silos were destroyed, while several barns were damaged. Homes sustained roof and siding damage. Irrigation pivots were overturned and chicken houses were destroyed as well.
Illinois
EF2	S of Marion	Williamson	37.63°N 89.05°W	1028	14.5 miles (23.3 km)	A large metal warehouse building was heavily damaged, and numerous homes sustained mainly minor roof damage. Hundreds of trees were snapped or uprooted along the path, and many power lines were downed. Several barns and outbuildings were destroyed or heavily damaged as well.
EF4	SW of Carrier Mills to ENE of Ridgway	Saline, Gallatin	37.74°N 88.55°W	1051	26.5 miles (42.6 km)	8 deaths – See section on this tornado – 108 people were injured.
EF2	Mounds to NW of Metropolis	Pulaski (IL), Ballard (KY), McCracken (KY), Massac (IL)	37.11°N 89.20°W	1100	26.5 miles (42.6 km)	This strong, long-track tornado crossed the Ohio River twice along the Illinois-Kentucky line. The tornado touched down in the town of Mounds, where a railroad cross arm was ripped off and driven into a vehicle. The tornado crossed into Kentucky and passed near the towns of Oscar and Bandana, destroying chicken houses, barns, a machine shed, and a mobile home. Several frame homes in this area sustained damage to their roofs, siding, and gutters. Past Bandana, the tornado heavily damaged or destroyed several homes and mobile homes and blew the steeple off of a church. Sheds and barns were destroyed, with debris deposited in trees hundreds of yards away. Vehicles in this area were moved up to 75 yards away from where they originated, and two semi-trailers were overturned. The tornado then crossed back into Illinois, where additional barns and sheds were destroyed before the tornado dissipated near Metropolis. Hundreds of trees were snapped and uprooted along the path. Five people were injured, one seriously.
Kentucky
EF1	NE of Henderson	Henderson	37.87°N 87.58°W	1157	1 mile (1.6 km)	This tornado moved along the north bank of the Ohio River, completely destroying a poorly constructed cabin and partially destroying three others. Several power poles were blown over as well.
EF0	NE of Madisonville	Hopkins	37.34°N 87.49°W	1240	0.5 miles (0.80 km)	Brief tornado caused no damage.
EF1	Southwestern Greenville	Muhlenberg	37.21°N 87.19°W	1445	700 feet (210 m)	Brief tornado touched down in the southwestern part of Greenville, where an apartment building lost portions of its roof decking and large branches were snapped off of trees. A barn structure had part of its roof torn off, and several houses sustained minor siding damage.
EF2	Eastern Greenville to S of Cleaton	Muhlenberg	37.21°N 87.18°W	1445	5.4 miles (8.7 km)	Second of two tornadoes to strike Greenville during this outbreak. The tornado touched down in the eastern part of town, where Muhlenberg South Middle School lost a significant portion of its roof and metal bleachers were tossed, frame homes had roofs ripped off, and large trees were snapped. A mobile home was rolled and destroyed, injuring the occupant. The tornado continued off to the northeast before lifting south of Cleaton, moving a modular home off of its cinder block foundation, ripping the roof off of a barn, and causing minor siding damage to several additional homes.
EF2	SE of Clarkson	Grayson	37.48°N 86.16°W	1542	2 miles (3.2 km)	Three mobile homes were tossed through the air and destroyed, one of which was thrown 400 yards. A brick home had its roof torn off and sustained some collapse of exterior walls. A convenience store sustained roof damage, headstones were knocked over in a cemetery, and trees were snapped as well. One person was seriously injured.
EF2	N of Glendale to SE of Elizabethtown	Hardin	37.62°N 85.90°W	1555	5 miles (8.0 km)	Several homes had their roofs ripped off, while other homes were damaged to a lesser degree. A barn was damaged and a work garage was destroyed. A trucking company housed in a metal industrial building was largely destroyed, with debris from the structure strewn across the Lincoln Parkway and into a nearby mobile home park. Numerous trees, power lines, and fences were downed along the path.
EF2	Southern Hodgenville	LaRue	37.56°N 85.77°W	1605	1.7 miles (2.7 km)	This intermittent tornado touched down to the west of Hodgenville and moved through the southern part of town. Damage near the beginning of the path consisted of minor roof damage and downed fences. In Hodgenville, two cars in a parking lot were rotated and one was flipped onto the other. Three homes in town sustained major damage, one of which lost its roof and an exterior wall. A daycare center sustained heavy roof damage, and several other structures had less severe damage to their roofs. Many trees were downed along the path.
EF2	Southeastern Hodgenville	LaRue	37.56°N 85.73°W	1612	0.9 miles (1.4 km)	Second of two EF2 tornadoes to strike Hodgenville during this outbreak. A work garage and two homes were significantly damaged, one of which had major damage to its exterior walls. A dumpster was thrown 75 yards into a tree, snapping it. Several treetops were damaged as well.
EF2	N of Mize to Malone	Morgan	37.87°N 83.37°W	1842	6 miles (9.7 km)	Intermittent tornado badly damaged homes and mobile homes in the Grassy Creek community. Barns and outbuildings were also damaged or destroyed. A billboard was blown over and a lodge was destroyed in Malone near the end of the path.
EF1	SE of Center	Metcalfe	37.13°N 85.68°W	1847	1.1 miles (1.8 km)	Numerous trees were snapped and several barns were damaged.
EF2	N of Russell Springs to WSW of Windsor	Russell, Casey	37.12°N 85.08°W	1922	7.2 miles (11.6 km)	Mobile homes and modular homes were badly damaged or completely destroyed along the path. One modular home was twisted counterclockwise off of its foundation, with roughly a quarter of the house itself blown away. A brick home sustained major roof damage and collapse of one exterior wall. Outbuildings were damaged and destroyed, including a large dairy barn that had much of its roof torn off with the debris scattered into a nearby grove of trees. Many trees were downed along the path.
EF1	ENE of Science Hill	Pulaski	37.18°N 84.58°W	1953	1.5 miles (2.4 km)	One barn was destroyed and several others suffered major damage. The top of a silo was blown off and several homes suffered major roof damage.
Indiana
EF1	Newburgh	Warrick	37.95°N 87.40°W	1203	2 miles (3.2 km)	A high-end EF1 tornado caused significant damage as it moved through Newburgh. Numerous homes had varying degrees of roof damage, two of which had their roofs blown off. Two businesses sustained roof damage, and another business had damage to its brick exterior wall. 12 telephone poles and numerous large trees were downed as well.
Tennessee
EF1	NW of Smithville to W of Bakers Crossroads	DeKalb, White	35.97°N 85.83°W	2147	13 miles (21 km)	1 death – A small home was knocked off of its stilt foundation and rolled down a hill, killing a woman inside. Other homes sustained minor to moderate roof damage, a small warehouse structure was destroyed, a mobile home was damaged, and a church had its steeple blown off. Trees were snapped and uprooted, and barns were damaged with debris scattered across fields and into power lines.
EF0	NNW of Sparta	White	36.02°N 85.53°W	2202	1.8 miles (2.9 km)	A home and barn suffered roof damage, and several trees were snapped or uprooted along the path.
EF2	NNW of Crossville	Cumberland	36.09°N 85.11°W	2230	5.1 miles (8.2 km)	2 deaths –Severe damage occurred in the Rinnie community as a result of this large wedge tornado. An unanchored and poorly built brick home was slid off of its foundation and destroyed, a nearby home had its roof torn off, and a mobile home was completely destroyed with debris scattered hundreds of yards away. Other homes sustained roof and siding damage. More than 1,000 trees were uprooted or snapped along the path. 7 people were injured.
EF0	NE of Greenback	Blount	35.68°N 84.14°W	0030	0.75 miles (1.21 km)	Damage was limited mainly to trees, though an awning was removed from the front of a house.
Sources: SPC Storm Reports for 02/28/12, SPC Storm Reports for 02/29/12, NWS Springfield, MO, NWS St. Louis, NWS Paducah, KY, NWS Louisville, NWS Jackson, KY, NWS Nashville, NWS Morristown, TN

== See also ==
- Tornadoes of 2012
- List of United States tornadoes in March 2012
