= 2012 Leap Day tornado outbreak =

Weather event in the United States

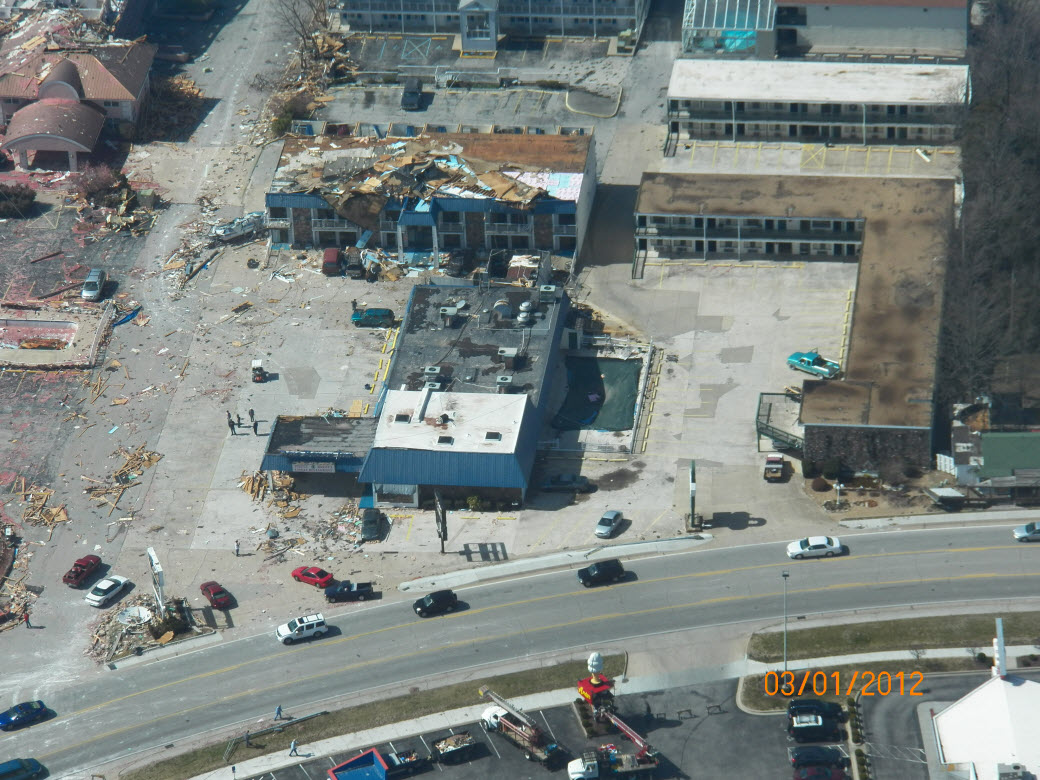
- Aerial view of damage from an EF2 tornado in Branson, Missouri.

Meteorological history
- Formed: February 28, 2012
- Dissipated: February 29, 2012

Tornado outbreak
- Tornadoes: 42 confirmed
- Max. rating: EF4 tornado
- Duration: 26 hours, 17 minutes
- Highest winds: Straight-line - 80 mph (130 km/h) in Cedar Vale, Kansas, on February 28.
- Largest hail: 3.00 in (7.6 cm) in Cherryvale, Kansas, on February 28.

Overall effects
- Fatalities: 15
- Injuries: 193
- Damage: $475 million (estimated)
- Part of the tornadoes of 2012

The 2012 Leap Day tornado outbreak was a significant and deadly tornado outbreak that started on February 28 and ended on February 29, 2012. It is so called because the second day was a leap day. It caused severe damage in several regions, especially the Great Plains and Ohio Valley regions. It also resulted in several tornadoes in the Central Plains, a rarity for the time of year. The most destructive and deadly tornado was a violent early-morning EF4 that hit Harrisburg, Illinois, killing 8 people. In total, 15 people died in the outbreak. Just two days later, a larger and deadlier outbreak devastated the Ohio Valley and Southern United States.

== Meteorological synopsis ==
A significant and deadly tornado outbreak began in the Great Plains on February 28, as supercell thunderstorms developed, and tornadoes touched down across the region. An EF2 tornado struck the small town of Harveyville, Kansas in the late evening, killing one person and injuring 12 others. The town's only church was completely destroyed, several homes received moderate to severe damage, and every building in the small community received a form of damage. As the storms moved into Missouri later that night and into the early morning of February 29, numerous strong tornadoes touched down. An EF2 devastated a mobile home park and killed one person near Buffalo, while an EF3 caused another fatality and destroyed homes near Asherville. By 3:00 am CST on February 29, Branson, Missouri was reporting injuries and severe damage to the town from an EF2 tornado, with homes destroyed and several hotels, businesses, and theaters sustaining severe damage. Three other deaths occurred in southern Missouri.

As the storms moved into Illinois pre-dawn, they merged into an intense squall line with embedded semi-discrete supercell thunderstorms. A violent EF4 tornado touched down and ripped through the city of Harrisburg, destroying entire neighborhoods, flattening businesses, and killing 8 people before causing additional destruction in the neighboring town of Ridgway. After sunrise, additional supercells developed and produced numerous tornadoes across Kentucky and Tennessee. Two tornadoes, rated EF1 and EF2, caused significant damage in Greenville, Kentucky. The town of Hodgenville, Kentucky, also sustained heavy damage from two separate EF2 tornadoes. An EF1 tornado caused a fatality near Smithville, Tennessee, and an EF2 destroyed homes and killed two more people near Crossville before the outbreak came to an end. A total of 42 tornadoes were confirmed, and 15 people were killed.

== Confirmed tornadoes ==
Confirmed tornadoes by Enhanced Fujita rating
EFU	EF0	EF1	EF2	EF3	EF4	EF5	Total
0	10	13	17	1	1	0	42

=== February 28 event ===
List of reported tornadoes – Tuesday, February 28, 2012
EF#	Location	County	Coord.	Time (UTC)	Path length	Comments/Damage
Nebraska
EF0	NE of North Platte	Lincoln, Logan	41.35°N 100.49°W	2213	3 miles (4.8 km)	Tornado was reported by an off-duty NWS employee and remained primarily over open fields, though scattered tree damage occurred and an irrigation pivot was also damaged. This was the first tornado to be reported in Nebraska in February since records began in 1950.
EF0	W of Greeley	Greeley	41.55°N 98.61°W	0100	Unknown	Very brief tornado in a field flipped and destroyed an irrigation pivot.
Kansas
EF0	SE of Randall	Jewell, Cloud	39.59°N 97.98°W	2328	4.8 miles (7.7 km)	Tornado struck a farm, damaging trees and tearing off the metal roof of an outbuilding. A small metal building was destroyed, a barn sustained roof damage, and water tanks were thrown. Cars were damaged by flying debris and power poles were broken.
EF0	Southeastern Belleville	Republic	39.79°N 97.68°W	0005	6.1 miles (9.8 km)	This weak tornado clipped the southeast side of Belleville. A few residences sustained minor damage in and around town, and many trees were downed at the Belleville Country Club. A few outbuildings were damaged outside of town as well.
EF0	SSW of Hutchinson	Reno	37.99°N 97.96°W	0043	1.2 miles (1.9 km)	Tornado destroyed a barn, downed a fence, and overturned a pickup truck and a stock trailer. A few trees were downed and a house sustained porch damage.
EF0	S of Hutchinson	Reno	37.94°N 98.00°W	0047	0.75 miles (1.21 km)	Brief tornado remained over an open field and caused no damage.
EF0	SE of Moundridge	McPherson	38.18°N 97.51°W	0117	2.3 miles (3.7 km)	Several trees and power lines were downed, and highway signs were twisted.
EF2	Harveyville	Wabaunsee	38.79°N 95.96°W	0302	5 miles (8.0 km)	1 death – This high-end EF2 tornado heavily damaged or destroyed many homes and other structures in Harveyville. A church was completely destroyed, and an apartment complex sustained major damage. Many trees and power poles were snapped throughout town, and vehicles were flipped. Almost every structure in Harveyville sustained some form of damage, and one man was fatally injured in his home. 12 other people were also injured. The tornado formed and dissipated so quickly, within three to five minutes, that no tornado warning was issued.
EF1	S of Globe	Franklin, Douglas	38.73°N 95.40°W	0406	3.5 miles (5.6 km)	Outbuildings and grain bins were destroyed, an RV trailer was overturned, and residences sustained some damage.
Missouri
EF1	WNW of Nashville to WNW of Lamar	Barton	37.39°N 94.56°W	0452	16 miles (26 km)	Five barns were damaged, along with the roofs of a farmhouse and a garage. Numerous trees were snapped or uprooted along the path.
EF1	NNW of Greenfield to SE of Aldrich	Dade, Polk	37.46°N 93.86°W	0526	18.6 miles (29.9 km)	Tornado damaged or destroyed ten barns, and inflicted roof damage to two homes along its path.
EF2	E of Schofield to SE of Buffalo	Polk, Dallas	37.55°N 93.19°W	0558	10 miles (16 km)	1 death – This tornado caused extensive damage near Buffalo. A mobile home park in that area was severely impacted, with mobile homes destroyed and one fatality occurring at that location. Two frame homes and three turkey barns were significantly damaged, and many trees and power poles were downed along the path. 12 people were injured.
Sources: SPC Storm Reports for 02/28/12, NWS North Platte, NWS Hastings, NE, NWS Topeka, NWS Wichita, NWS Springfield, MO, NCDC Storm Events Database

=== February 29 event ===
List of reported tornadoes – Wednesday, February 29, 2012
EF#	Location	County	Coord.	Time (UTC)	Path length	Comments/Damage
Missouri
EF1	NW of Phillipsburg to Southern Lebanon	Laclede	37.57°N 92.81°W	0618	11 miles (18 km)	Tornado damaged structures along its path, mainly in the southern part of Lebanon. Several homes and a boat plant sustained roof damage, and a Lowe's garden center was severely damaged. Several other businesses were also damaged, a mobile home was destroyed, and many trees were downed along the path. Five people were injured.
EF1	SE of Bennett Spring	Laclede	37.72°N 92.84°W	0622	0.25 miles (0.40 km)	Tornado struck a campground, damaging or destroying at least 20 RV campers. Numerous trees and a pole barn were damaged. An antique shop and two homes sustained minor roof damage as well.
EF2	NW of Cassville	Barry	36.70°N 93.92°W	0642	1.7 miles (2.7 km)	1 death – Four mobile homes and one frame home were destroyed near Cassville. Another frame home was significantly damaged, and a tractor trailer was flipped. The fatality occurred when an elderly man was killed in the destruction of his mobile home. Four others were injured.
EF1	NW of Edgar Springs to NE of Lake Spring	Phelps, Dent	37.71°N 91.88°W	0706	19 miles (31 km)	The damage from this tornado was limited to downed trees as it impacted heavily forested areas along its path.
EF2	Kimberling City to S of Kissee Mills	Stone, Taney	36.64°N 93.22°W	0713	22 miles (35 km)	47 injures – See article on this tornado – 47 people were injured after this strong, EF2-rated tornado struck Kimberling City and Branson.
EF2	W of Jewett to ESE of Sedgewickville	Madison, Bollinger	37.45°N 90.12°W	0910	20.75 miles (33.39 km)	Barns and homes sustained roof damage along the path, and one small and poorly constructed home was completely destroyed and swept from its foundation with debris strewn in all directions. A mobile home was flipped onto its roof, and a businesses had half of its roof torn off. Numerous large trees were snapped and uprooted along the path, and many power poles were downed as well. One person was injured.
EF2	ENE of Mayfield	Bollinger, Cape Girardeau	37.47°N 89.86°W	0934	7.65 miles (12.31 km)	Multiple-vortex tornado damaged three frame homes. Each home had a majority of its windows blown out, including one that part of its roof torn off. One of these homes had its attached garage lifted and tossed 100 yards (91 m) downwind. Two mobile homes had their roofs partially ripped off, large trees were snapped and uprooted, and outbuildings were destroyed as well.
EF2	Oak Ridge to SE of Makanda, Illinois	Cape Girardeau, Union (IL), Jackson (IL)	37.50°N 89.73°W	0947	32 miles (51 km)	This long-track multiple-vortex tornado first touched down in Oak Ridge, where homes sustained primarily partial roof loss. Additional homes sustained similar damage near Pocahontas. The tornado crossed into Illinois, where several homes were damaged in the town of Alto Pass before it dissipated near Makanda. Thousands of trees were snapped and uprooted along the path, power lines were downed, and many barns and grain bins were destroyed.
EF3	W of Asherville to W of Bell City	Stoddard	36.90°N 90.21°W	1000	21 miles (34 km)	1 death – Barns, outbuildings, and mobile homes were destroyed along the path, with a fatality occurring in one of the mobile homes. A frame home was destroyed, while another was severely damaged. Several other frame homes sustained minor damage, and a total of 50 structures were damaged or destroyed along the path.
EF1	E of Bell City to SE of Benton	Stoddard, Scott	37.02°N 89.80°W	1024	17.5 miles (28.2 km)	Grain bins and silos were destroyed, while several barns were damaged. Homes sustained roof and siding damage. Irrigation pivots were overturned and chicken houses were destroyed as well.
Illinois
EF2	S of Marion	Williamson	37.63°N 89.05°W	1028	14.5 miles (23.3 km)	A large metal warehouse building was heavily damaged, and numerous homes sustained mainly minor roof damage. Hundreds of trees were snapped or uprooted along the path, and many power lines were downed. Several barns and outbuildings were destroyed or heavily damaged as well.
EF4	SW of Carrier Mills to ENE of Ridgway	Saline, Gallatin	37.74°N 88.55°W	1051	26.5 miles (42.6 km)	8 deaths – See section on this tornado – 108 people were injured.
EF2	Mounds to NW of Metropolis	Pulaski (IL), Ballard (KY), McCracken (KY), Massac (IL)	37.11°N 89.20°W	1100	26.5 miles (42.6 km)	This strong, long-track tornado crossed the Ohio River twice along the Illinois-Kentucky line. The tornado touched down in the town of Mounds, where a railroad cross arm was ripped off and driven into a vehicle. The tornado crossed into Kentucky and passed near the towns of Oscar and Bandana, destroying chicken houses, barns, a machine shed, and a mobile home. Several frame homes in this area sustained damage to their roofs, siding, and gutters. Past Bandana, the tornado heavily damaged or destroyed several homes and mobile homes and blew the steeple off of a church. Sheds and barns were destroyed, with debris deposited in trees hundreds of yards away. Vehicles in this area were moved up to 75 yards away from where they originated, and two semi-trailers were overturned. The tornado then crossed back into Illinois, where additional barns and sheds were destroyed before the tornado dissipated near Metropolis. Hundreds of trees were snapped and uprooted along the path. Five people were injured, one seriously.
Kentucky
EF1	NE of Henderson	Henderson	37.87°N 87.58°W	1157	1 mile (1.6 km)	This tornado moved along the north bank of the Ohio River, completely destroying a poorly constructed cabin and partially destroying three others. Several power poles were blown over as well.
EF0	NE of Madisonville	Hopkins	37.34°N 87.49°W	1240	0.5 miles (0.80 km)	Brief tornado caused no damage.
EF1	Southwestern Greenville	Muhlenberg	37.21°N 87.19°W	1445	700 feet (210 m)	Brief tornado touched down in the southwestern part of Greenville, where an apartment building lost portions of its roof decking and large branches were snapped off of trees. A barn structure had part of its roof torn off, and several houses sustained minor siding damage.
EF2	Eastern Greenville to S of Cleaton	Muhlenberg	37.21°N 87.18°W	1445	5.4 miles (8.7 km)	Second of two tornadoes to strike Greenville during this outbreak. The tornado touched down in the eastern part of town, where Muhlenberg South Middle School lost a significant portion of its roof and metal bleachers were tossed, frame homes had roofs ripped off, and large trees were snapped. A mobile home was rolled and destroyed, injuring the occupant. The tornado continued off to the northeast before lifting south of Cleaton, moving a modular home off of its cinder block foundation, ripping the roof off of a barn, and causing minor siding damage to several additional homes.
EF2	SE of Clarkson	Grayson	37.48°N 86.16°W	1542	2 miles (3.2 km)	Three mobile homes were tossed through the air and destroyed, one of which was thrown 400 yards. A brick home had its roof torn off and sustained some collapse of exterior walls. A convenience store sustained roof damage, headstones were knocked over in a cemetery, and trees were snapped as well. One person was seriously injured.
EF2	N of Glendale to SE of Elizabethtown	Hardin	37.62°N 85.90°W	1555	5 miles (8.0 km)	Several homes had their roofs ripped off, while other homes were damaged to a lesser degree. A barn was damaged and a work garage was destroyed. A trucking company housed in a metal industrial building was largely destroyed, with debris from the structure strewn across the Lincoln Parkway and into a nearby mobile home park. Numerous trees, power lines, and fences were downed along the path.
EF2	Southern Hodgenville	LaRue	37.56°N 85.77°W	1605	1.7 miles (2.7 km)	This intermittent tornado touched down to the west of Hodgenville and moved through the southern part of town. Damage near the beginning of the path consisted of minor roof damage and downed fences. In Hodgenville, two cars in a parking lot were rotated and one was flipped onto the other. Three homes in town sustained major damage, one of which lost its roof and an exterior wall. A daycare center sustained heavy roof damage, and several other structures had less severe damage to their roofs. Many trees were downed along the path.
EF2	Southeastern Hodgenville	LaRue	37.56°N 85.73°W	1612	0.9 miles (1.4 km)	Second of two EF2 tornadoes to strike Hodgenville during this outbreak. A work garage and two homes were significantly damaged, one of which had major damage to its exterior walls. A dumpster was thrown 75 yards into a tree, snapping it. Several treetops were damaged as well.
EF2	N of Mize to Malone	Morgan	37.87°N 83.37°W	1842	6 miles (9.7 km)	Intermittent tornado badly damaged homes and mobile homes in the Grassy Creek community. Barns and outbuildings were also damaged or destroyed. A billboard was blown over and a lodge was destroyed in Malone near the end of the path.
EF1	SE of Center	Metcalfe	37.13°N 85.68°W	1847	1.1 miles (1.8 km)	Numerous trees were snapped and several barns were damaged.
EF2	N of Russell Springs to WSW of Windsor	Russell, Casey	37.12°N 85.08°W	1922	7.2 miles (11.6 km)	Mobile homes and modular homes were badly damaged or completely destroyed along the path. One modular home was twisted counterclockwise off of its foundation, with roughly a quarter of the house itself blown away. A brick home sustained major roof damage and collapse of one exterior wall. Outbuildings were damaged and destroyed, including a large dairy barn that had much of its roof torn off with the debris scattered into a nearby grove of trees. Many trees were downed along the path.
EF1	ENE of Science Hill	Pulaski	37.18°N 84.58°W	1953	1.5 miles (2.4 km)	One barn was destroyed and several others suffered major damage. The top of a silo was blown off and several homes suffered major roof damage.
Indiana
EF1	Newburgh	Warrick	37.95°N 87.40°W	1203	2 miles (3.2 km)	A high-end EF1 tornado caused significant damage as it moved through Newburgh. Numerous homes had varying degrees of roof damage, two of which had their roofs blown off. Two businesses sustained roof damage, and another business had damage to its brick exterior wall. 12 telephone poles and numerous large trees were downed as well.
Tennessee
EF1	NW of Smithville to W of Bakers Crossroads	DeKalb, White	35.97°N 85.83°W	2147	13 miles (21 km)	1 death – A small home was knocked off of its stilt foundation and rolled down a hill, killing a woman inside. Other homes sustained minor to moderate roof damage, a small warehouse structure was destroyed, a mobile home was damaged, and a church had its steeple blown off. Trees were snapped and uprooted, and barns were damaged with debris scattered across fields and into power lines.
EF0	NNW of Sparta	White	36.02°N 85.53°W	2202	1.8 miles (2.9 km)	A home and barn suffered roof damage, and several trees were snapped or uprooted along the path.
EF2	NNW of Crossville	Cumberland	36.09°N 85.11°W	2230	5.1 miles (8.2 km)	2 deaths –Severe damage occurred in the Rinnie community as a result of this large wedge tornado. An unanchored and poorly built brick home was slid off of its foundation and destroyed, a nearby home had its roof torn off, and a mobile home was completely destroyed with debris scattered hundreds of yards away. Other homes sustained roof and siding damage. More than 1,000 trees were uprooted or snapped along the path. 7 people were injured.
EF0	NE of Greenback	Blount	35.68°N 84.14°W	0030	0.75 miles (1.21 km)	Damage was limited mainly to trees, though an awning was removed from the front of a house.
Sources: SPC Storm Reports for 02/28/12, SPC Storm Reports for 02/29/12, NWS Springfield, MO, NWS St. Louis, NWS Paducah, KY, NWS Louisville, NWS Jackson, KY, NWS Nashville, NWS Morristown, TN

=== Kimberling City–Branson–Kissee Mills, Missouri ===
Kimberling City–Branson–Kissee Mills, Missouri
- A photo of the tornado as it was traveling through Branson

Meteorological history
- Formed: February 29, 2012, 1:13 a.m. CST
- Dissipated: February 29, 2012, 1:32 a.m. CST
- Duration: 19 minutes

EF2 tornado
- on the Enhanced Fujita scale
- Highest winds: 130 mph (210 km/h)

Overall effects
- Fatalities: 0
- Injuries: 47

This strong, EF2-rated tornado first touched down near the shore of Table Rock Lake at 1:13 a.m. on February 29 before tracking 22 miles through Stone County and Taney County within the state of Missouri. It caused damage in Kimberling City before striking Branson, tracking down the Branson Strip. Kimbering City suffered damage to around 30 homes, the Kimberling Inn, and the Port of Kimberling Marina, where 150 boats were damaged and four docks were destroyed. In Branson, the tornado damaged numerous attractions, businesses, and residences. 14 attractions within Branson were damaged, along with 25 restaurants and 21 hotels. Around 100 homes within the Branson area were damaged or destroyed. Several of Branson's historical theaters also sustained damaged. The tornado struck the Branson Landing, damaging 70% of the Hilton Convention Center Hotel's windows before crossing Lake Taneycomo and tracking through rural areas. The tornado dissipated at 1:32 a.m. southeast of Kissee Mills. The tornado inflicted $20.5 million (2012 USD) in damages, and injured 47 people, with 10 people being injured within Stone County and 37 people sustaining injuries within Taney County.

=== Harrisburg–Ridgway, Illinois ===
Harrisburg–Ridgway, Illinois
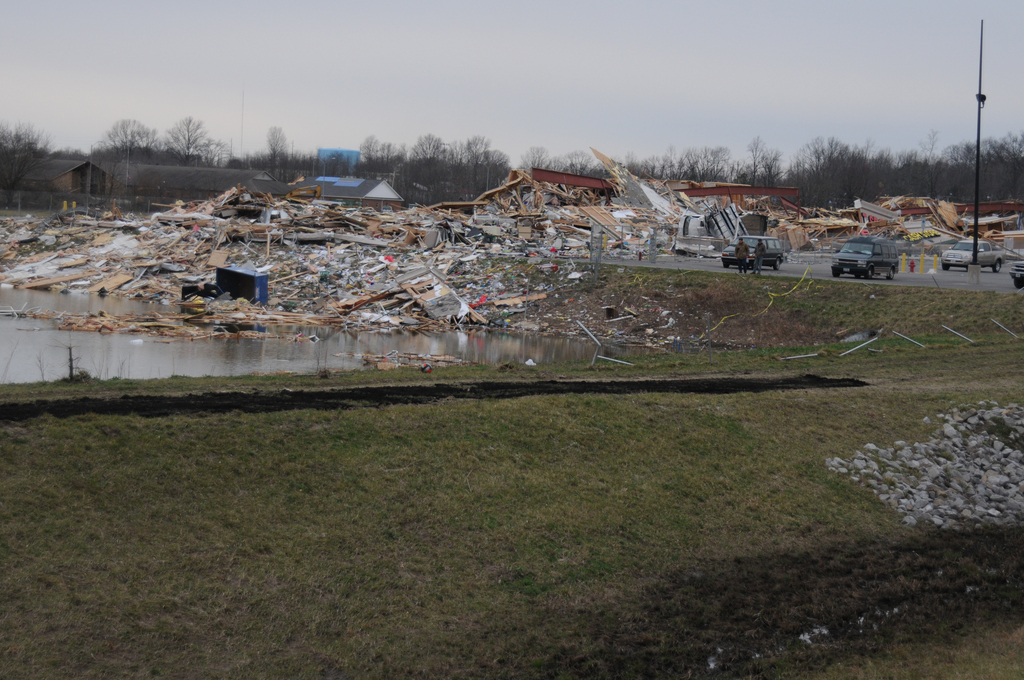
- EF4 damage to a strip mall in Harrisburg.

Meteorological history
- Formed: February 29, 2012, 4:51 a.m. CST
- Dissipated: February 29, 2012, 5:04 a.m. CST
- Duration: 22 minutes

EF4 tornado
- on the Enhanced Fujita scale
- Max width: 275 yards (0.156 mi; 0.251 km)
- Path length: 26.5 miles (42.6 km)
- Highest winds: 180 mph (290 km/h)

Overall effects
- Fatalities: 8
- Injuries: 108
- Damage: $3 million (2012 USD)

This violent early morning tornado produced devastating damage and fatalities in Harrisburg, Illinois, and caused additional severe damage in the neighboring town of Ridgway shortly before sunrise on February 29, 2012. The Harrisburg/Ridgway tornado was spawned by a semi-discrete supercell thunderstorm embedded within a larger squall line of storms that was racing through southern Illinois at the time. Touching down to the southwest of Carrier Mills at 4:51 a.m. The tornado initially snapped tree limbs at EF0 intensity as it moved to the northeast and clipped the northern edge of town. A church in this area had its steeple bent over and one of its exterior walls bowed out. EF0 damage continued to the north of Ledford, with a home sustaining minor damage in that area. Past Ledford, the tornado strengthened to EF1 intensity as it uprooted large trees and moved through the Liberty community at the southwest edge of Harrisburg, where it caused minor damage to Harrisburg Middle School. The tornado continued to intensify as it entered the southwestern edge of the city at 4:56 a.m., tearing through the Dorrisville neighborhood at EF2 strength, where many homes sustained significant damage and numerous trees were snapped and uprooted. A few small homes were destroyed, and a farm service business in this area sustained heavy damage.

The tornado then rapidly intensified into a violent EF4 as it crossed South Commercial Street, where some businesses were completely leveled with only piles of rubble left behind. Several other businesses were damaged, and the large Christ Lutheran Church was flattened with debris wind-rowed long distances through a nearby field. A paper check from the church was later found in the yard of a residence 45 miles away. Continuing at EF4 strength, the tornado proceeded to level a large strip mall just to the south of the Walmart Supercenter, with large amounts of debris strewn into a nearby retention pond. EF4 damage continued as the tornado devastated the Gaskins City neighborhood. Numerous homes in this area were badly damaged or destroyed, several of which were leveled or swept from their foundations. Seven people were confirmed dead in this area. Most of the fatalities occurred at a small apartment complex along Brady Street, where small one-story apartment buildings were swept away. On June 3 another victim died in the hospital from their injuries, raising the death toll to 8. Vehicles were tossed and destroyed, many trees and power lines were downed, and metal fence posts were bent to the ground in this area as well. Harrisburg Medical Center also sustained major damage as the tornado exited Harrisburg and continued off to the northeast. Peak winds in Harrisburg were estimated to have been about 180 mph, and the width of the tornado path was 275 yards (251 m). About 200 homes and about 25 businesses within the city were destroyed or severely damaged, with many other structures being damaged to a lesser degree. In addition to the 8 fatalities, 95 other people were injured, some critically. The following night, a mandatory curfew was in place in the affected areas; 5PM Wednesday afternoon through 7AM Thursday morning. Counting damage and death toll, it was reported to be the worst tornado related disaster in the United States since the Joplin, Missouri tornado of 2011. Harrisburg Unit 3 schools were closed until 5 March 2012 and upon reopening offered trauma counseling to its students. Westboro Baptist Church commented on the event, which prompted locals to create a "shield of support" around the funeral processions with thousands attending, standing in large groups around the city. The Federal Emergency Management Agency (FEMA) and IEMA began doing preliminary damage assessments on 5 March 2012 to determine the need for public assistance from FEMA. The tornado damage in Harrisburg dominated national airwaves for several days with both Anderson Cooper, and Diane Sawyer doing special reports. Both The New York Times and Chicago Tribune wrote articles on the resilient history and nature of Harrisburg in the wake of the tornado and floods that have hit the city since its founding in 1889.

Just northeast of Harrisburg, EF3 tree damage was observed as the tornado crossed Illinois Route 13, with hardwood trees denuded and debarked in this area. An adult bookstore was destroyed at high-end EF2 intensity near this location as well, sustaining loss of its roof and collapse of exterior walls. The tornado continued through very sparsely populated areas of Saline County, traversing open farm fields and debarking several additional hardwood trees at EF3 strength. As the tornado passed to the south of Eldorado, trees were uprooted and another house had significant roof and exterior wall loss, with the damage at that location rated high-end EF2. As the tornado approached the Gallatin County line, a house sustained EF3 damage and was left with only interior rooms standing. The tornado then crossed into Gallatin County, snapping trees and inflicting high-end EF2 damage to another home. The tornado continued northeastward before striking the town of Ridgway, where severe damage occurred. In Ridgway, the tornado damaged about 140 homes and businesses, with considerable damage to some structures in the downtown area. Numerous cars were tossed around, mainly on the east side of town. A factory building was severely damaged, many large trees were snapped and uprooted, power lines were downed, and about a half dozen grain bins were completely destroyed. Most of the damage in Ridgway was within the EF2 range, though a small pocket of low-end EF4 damage occurred where large and well-built brick church was almost entirely leveled with only part of the front wall left standing. No fatalities occurred in Ridgway, though 13 people were injured, one critically. Past Ridgway, the tornado snapped and uprooted trees at EF1 to EF2 strength before dissipating east-northeast of town. The Harrisburg/Ridgway tornado had a total path length of 26.5 miles and was on the ground for 22 minutes.

== See also ==
- Weather of 2012
- List of North American tornadoes and tornado outbreaks
- List of F4 and EF4 tornadoes
  - List of F4 and EF4 tornadoes (2010–2019)
- Tornado outbreak of Leap Day 1952 – Another destructive tornado outbreak that occurred on a Leap Day and produced a violent F4 tornado
- Tornado outbreak of March 2–3, 2012 – A larger and deadlier tornado outbreak that occurred immediately after this one.
