= 2012 Branson tornado =

2012 tornado in Missouri, U.S.

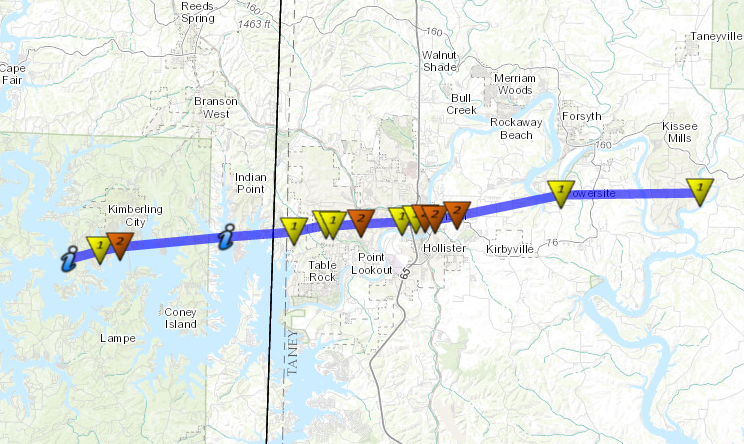
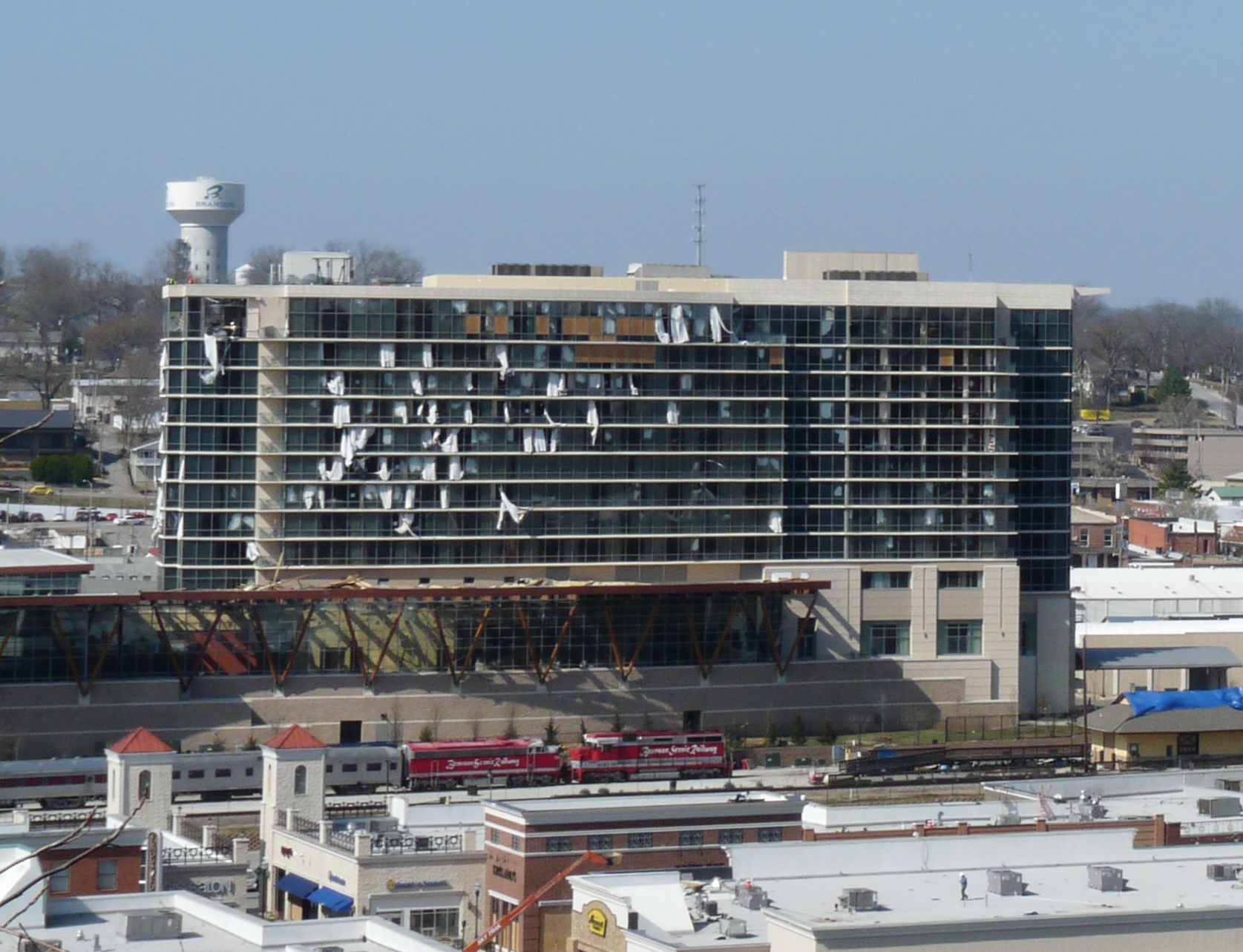
- Clockwise from top: A photo of the tornado as it was traveling through Branson; A view of the Hilton Convention Center Hotel, which sustained damage from the tornado; The track of the tornado

Meteorological history
- Formed: February 29, 2012, 1:13 a.m. CST
- Dissipated: February 29, 2012, 1:32 a.m. CST
- Duration: 19 minutes

EF2 tornado
- on the Enhanced Fujita scale
- Max width: 400 yards (0.23 mi; 0.37 km)
- Path length: 24.29 miles (39.09 km)
- Highest winds: 130 mph (210 km/h)

Overall effects
- Fatalities: 0
- Injuries: 47
- Damage: $20.5 million (2012 USD)
- Areas affected: Kimberling City, Missouri; Branson, Missouri
- Power outages: 6,500
- Houses destroyed: ~130
- Part of the 2012 Leap Day tornado outbreak and Tornadoes of 2012

During the pre-dawn hours of February 29, 2012, a strong, fast-moving, and damaging nocturnal tornado that was part of a deadly outbreak tracked 24.29 miles (39.09 km) through portions of Stone and Taney counties in Missouri, United States. The tornado caused damage in Kimberling City and nearby areas before directly impacting the city of Branson, injuring 47 people and inflicting $20.5 million (2012 USD) (Note: All amounts of money are in 2012 USD unless stated otherwise.) in damage. Over 100 boats were damaged at the Port of Kimberling Marina, and many other businesses and homes were significantly damaged, with the Branson Strip and the Branson Landing sustaining direct hits. Around 100 homes were damaged or destroyed along the tornado's path, with dozens of attractions and establishments, including several of Branson's historical theaters, being severely damaged. The Hilton Branson Convention Center Hotel, a twelve-story structure, had 70% of its windows blown out. The Joplin tornado, which occurred less than a year prior, reportedly prepared the Branson area for tornadic events by influencing response plans and heightening awareness for tornadoes.

== Meteorological synopsis ==
On the morning of February 28, 2012, the Storm Prediction Center outlined a slight risk for severe weather throughout much of southern Missouri, including a 2-5% chance for tornadoes within the region, as a surface low from the Colorado Front Range crossed the northern plains, and a dry line developed ahead of the low. Southernly surface winds brought moisture into the region, increasing atmospheric instability. This slight risk was expanded to include most of the state as the day progressed, with a 5% chance for tornadoes being outlined for much of the southern portion of Missouri, as a mid-level jet created an environment favorable for supercellular development. Storms began to develop along a fast-moving squall line around 10:00 p.m. CST, (Note: All times listed in the article are in CST unless stated otherwise.) with numerous embedded supercells being present. Strong winds and numerous tornadoes were reported across southeastern Kansas and the Missouri Ozarks, including the one that would strike the city of Branson.

== Tornado summary ==
=== Touchdown and impacts in Kimberling City ===
The tornado initially touched down in Stone County, Missouri, at 1:13 a.m. to the southwest of Kimberling City, near the shore of Table Rock Lake. As the tornado tracked through the city with a forward speed of around 55–65 mph (89–105 km/h), it inflicted EF1 to EF2 damage upon 30 homes and significantly damaged the Kimberling Inn. Numerous vehicles were also damaged. Around this time, the tornado reached a maximum width of 400 yards (0.23 mi; 0.37 km). Four large boat docks at the Port of Kimberling Marina were destroyed and around 150 vessels sustained damage, with one sinking. The tornado then made several landfalls as it passed over Table Rock Lake, tracking south of Indian Point. The tornado injured 10 people within Stone County.

=== Impacts in Branson ===
The tornado as it was passing by the Branson Park Apartments

At 1:19 a.m., the tornado crossed into Taney County at EF1 intensity, just west of Branson. The tornado would then produce damage ranging from EF1 to EF2 intensity as it tracked north of the Table Rock suburb and Point Lookout. The tornado then entered the city of Branson, where the most significant damage occurred. The tornado paralleled West 76 Country Boulevard (the Branson Strip) at EF2 strength for around 7 miles (11 km), damaging numerous buildings and injuring 37 people. Large trees were toppled by the winds. Power lines were downed, and 14 attractions were damaged. At least five of Branson's historical theaters were impacted, with the Branson Variety Theater, Americana Theater, and Dick Clark's American Bandstand Theater sustaining the worst damage. Additionally, 25 restaurants and 21 hotels along the strip suffered heavy damage. Several vehicles at the Ride The Ducks attraction were overturned and damaged. A biplane in front of a mini-golf course was knocked off its stand. The J.R.'s Motor Inn, which had six guests at the time, had the roof, second floor, and all windows completely destroyed. The tornado ripped off a Walmart's roof, and the connected Branson Mall was also heavily damaged. A Jubilee grocery store suffered similar destruction. The Branson Auto Museum had its roof torn away, and seven cars on display were damaged by flying debris. The tornado then struck the Veterans Memorial Museum, with a P-51 Mustang airplane that sat outside the building being torn apart.

==== Impacts on the Branson Landing and dissipation ====
The tornado then tracked through residential areas within Taney County, destroying and damaging roughly 100 homes, including several mobile homes, before striking the Branson Landing. Many buildings within the Branson Landing sustained damage, and at roughly 1:20 a.m., the Hilton Branson Convention Center Hotel, a 12-story building, had 70% of its windows blown out or cracked by the tornado, with 219 of the 294 rooms being impacted. The lower roof of the building also sustained damage. Two guests staying in the hotel suffered minor injuries. The tornado then crossed Lake Taneycomo before striking the Candlestick Inn, which suffered extreme damage with portions of the roof being torn away. The tornado exited Branson to the east before tracking over rural areas at EF1 intensity, inflicting damage on various houses before lifting southeast of Kissee Mills at 1:32 a.m.

== Aftermath ==
=== Damage ===
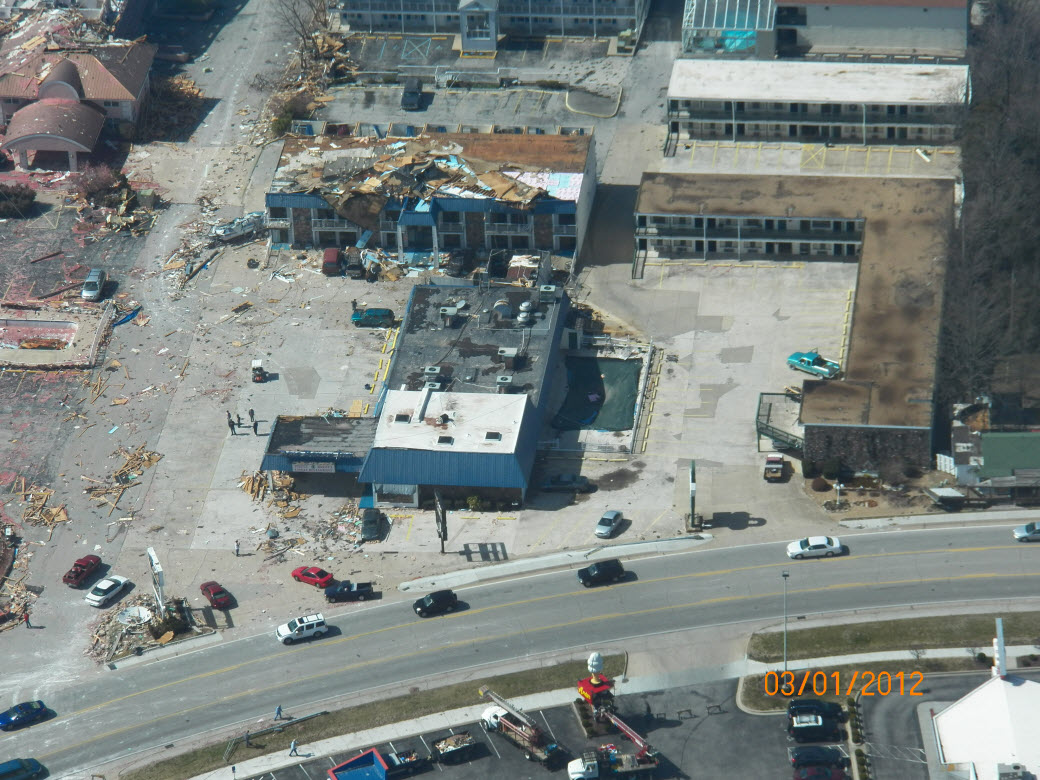
Aerial view of the damage in Branson

A dashcam video showing damage along the Branson Strip

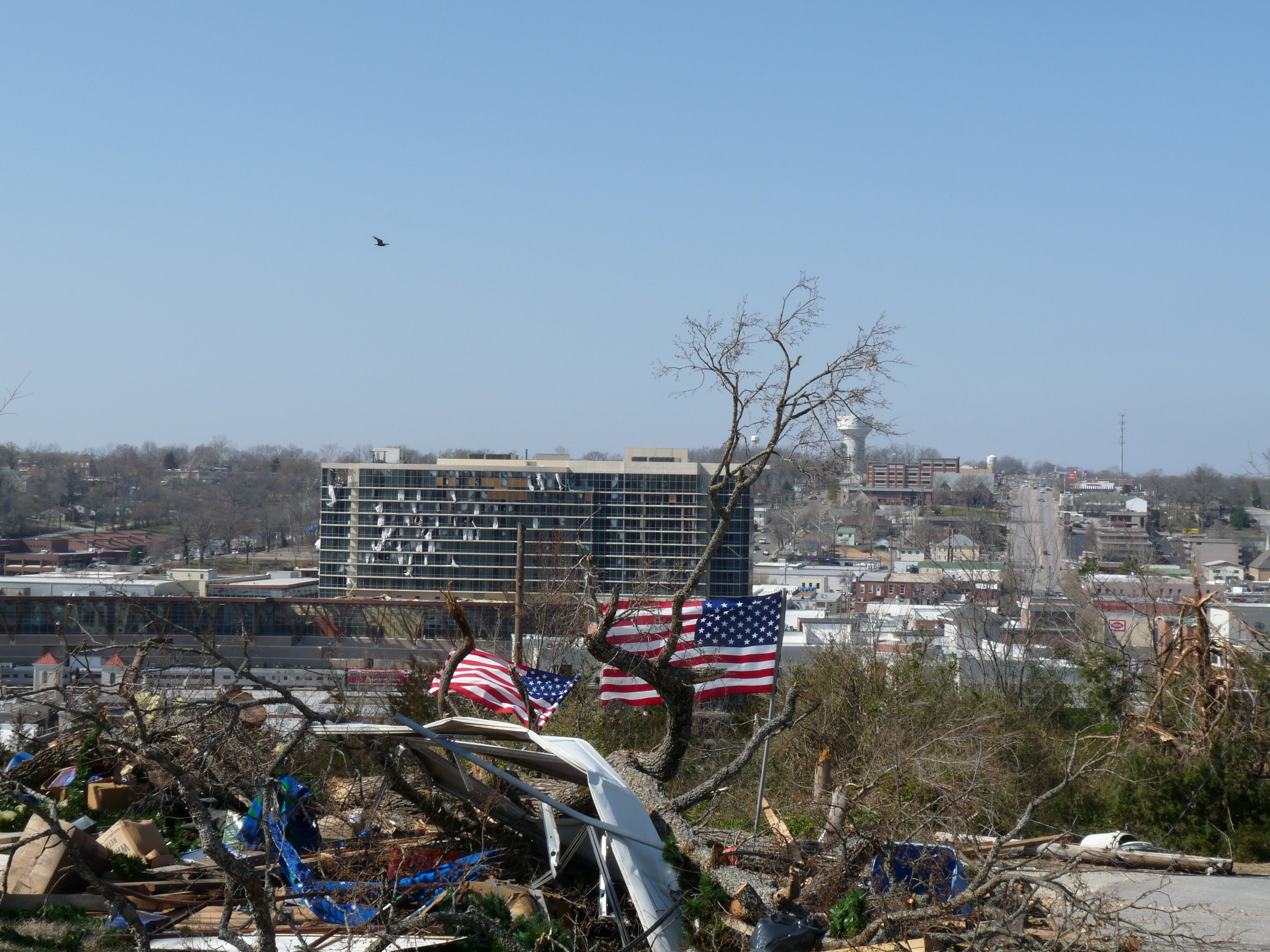
Damage from the tornado, with the Hilton Convention Center Hotel in the background

The tornado's damage was concentrated but significant. In Kimberling City, 30 homes and numerous vehicles suffered damage. Two of the city's largest businesses, the Kimberling Inn and Port of Kimberling Marina, were significantly damaged by the tornado. One of the largest docks at the Port of Kimberling Marina was destroyed, along with three other sizeable docks. Nearly 150 boats suffered damage, with one sinking. The damage to the city ended up canceling a large fishing tournament. The tornado inflicted $5.5 million (2012 USD) in damages within Stone County.

Around 700 properties suffered some kind of damage in Branson, 37 of which were completely destroyed. Approximately 100 single-family residences and mobile homes were damaged or destroyed along the tornado's path through Branson. The tornado knocked out power for 6,500 people, and numerous propane leaks were reported. In Branson, 14 attractions, 25 restaurants, and 21 hotels along the strip sustained damage. Additionally, Branson Heights Shopping Center and several gas stations were damaged by the tornado.

Around five of the city's roughly 50 theaters were heavily damaged, with the Branson Variety Theater, Americana Theater, and Dick Clark's American Bandstand Theater being impacted the most. The Branson Variety Theater had its gift shop and lobby nearly completely destroyed. The Hilton Convention Center Hotel had 70% of its windows blown out or damaged, with 219 of the 294 hotel rooms being affected. All the carpet in the rooms and the lobby had to be replaced. The roof on the second floor corridor was torn off, and snapped fire sprinklers caused severe water damage. Approximately 10% of the hotel rooms within the city were affected by the tornado. The tornado caused $15 million in damages in Taney County. Branson officials reportedly downplayed the damage within Branson in an effort to reassure tourists, stating that the majority of the damage was cosmetic and wouldn't prevent any shows from being performed.

=== Recovery efforts ===
In the wake of the tornado, it was reported that the 2011 Joplin tornado, which had occurred less than a year earlier, prepared the Branson area for the storm. City officials who traveled to Joplin after the 2011 disaster applied lessons they learned during the recovery process to build effective emergency plans for Branson. Members of the Branson Fire Department stated that their deployment in Joplin helped them prepare for the tornado in their city. It was also noted that, for some residents, the tornado that struck Branson revived memories of the Joplin tornado. Additionally, many residents within the city reportedly were more aware of the dangers posed by tornadoes and sought proper shelter. The city of Joplin sent officers to Branson after the 2012 tornado, with Branson officials noting that after they sent crews to Joplin after the 2011 tornado to assist in recovery and cleanup, Joplin officials were willing to return the favor.

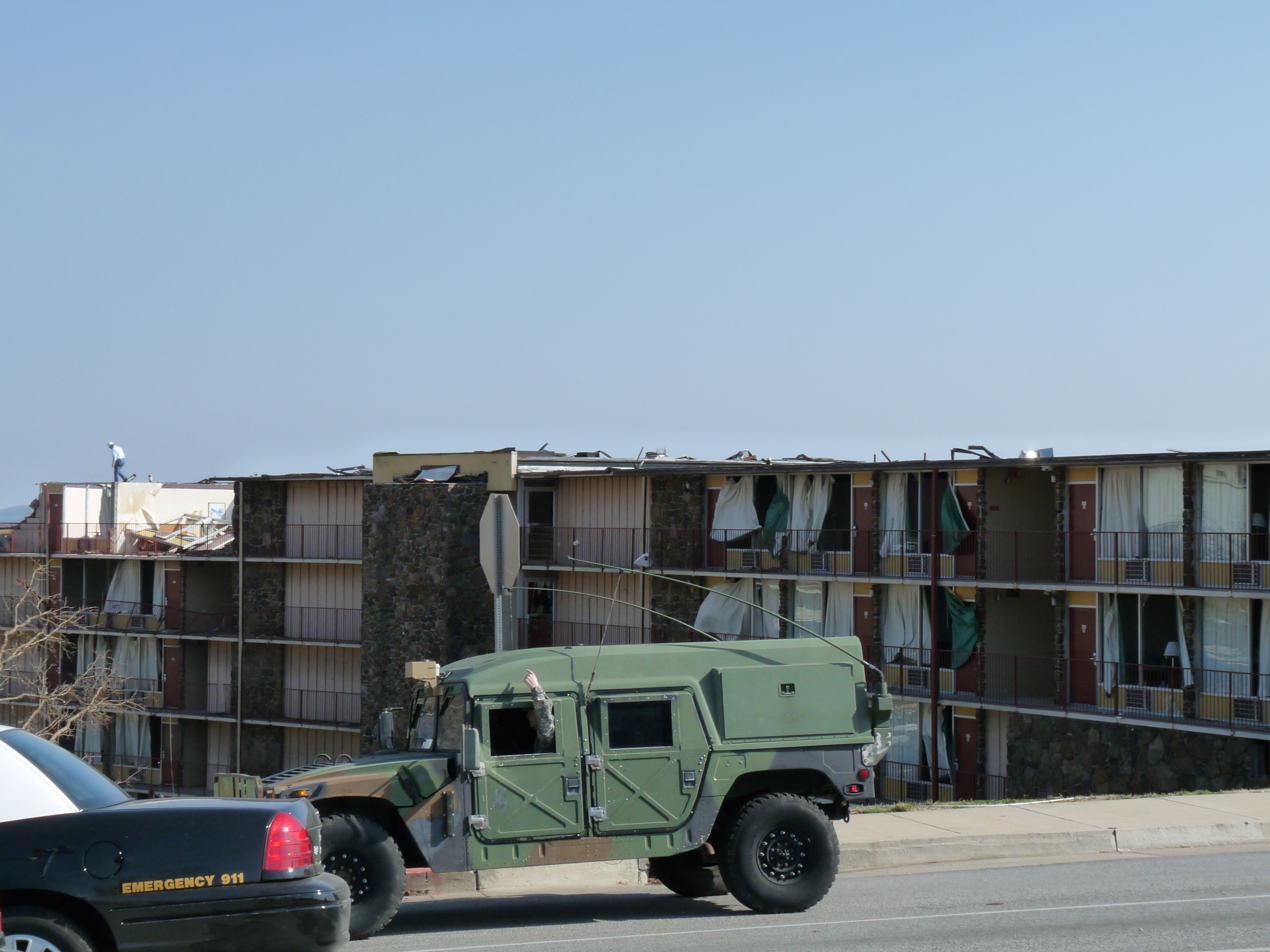
The National Guard in Branson, following the 2012 tornado

Missouri Governor Jay Nixon issued a state of emergency, and requested a major disaster declaration for 18 counties affected by the tornado outbreak, but FEMA declined the request. In the days following the tornado, the Missouri National Guard deployed around 50 soldiers to the Branson area to assist local law enforcement with security and recovery.

The American Red Cross set up a disaster relief shelter at the Branson recreation center, donating food and providing showers and accommodations to those displaced by the tornado. Local hotels contacted the Red Cross, offering rooms to those who lost their house in the storm. The Salvation Army provided up to $100 for each household affected by the tornado, and emotional and spiritual support was offered. Two canteens were set up in the Branson area to provide tornado victims with warm food and beverages.

In the days following the tornado, 200 volunteers from the Missouri Assembly of God traveled to Branson and assisted in reconstruction of damaged infrastructure and the cleanup of debris.

Fans of Dordt University's basketball team, who traveled to Missouri to watch the team compete in the national finals, assisted in the cleanup after the college's staff connected with Branson's First Presbyterian Church in order to ask how to help with recovery efforts. On March 7, 25 volunteers assisted in the cleanup and repair of a woman's house. On March 8, over 50 volunteers cleaned up debris from a destroyed house, with several using chainsaws to clear downed trees and branches.

In the years following the tornado, the damaged buildings were repaired, repurposed, or demolished. The Kimberling Inn tore down two of its motel units due to the damaged they sustained, with the rest of the inn being repaired. The Hilton Convention Center Hotel reopened six months after the tornado. The Branson Mall was closed for over two years before being purchased by a separate company and refurbished. The Candlestick Inn was permanently closed following the tornado, as the damage inflicted was severe and there were various issues with insurance. Numerous buildings, such as the Riverboat Inn, the JR's Motor Inn, the Silver Fountain Inn, and the Leisure County Inn, had to be demolished due to suffering extreme damage. By September 23, 2013, $17.1 million (2013 USD) in construction permits were attributed to the tornado.

The Highway 76 Complete Street Project, an $80 million (2014 USD) plan to renovate the Branson Strip, was reportedly a direct response to the tornado's damage. The project intended on improving the design of the roadway, storing utilities such as powerlines underground, installing new sidewalks, and enhancing the landscaping.

=== Casualties ===
The tornado injured 47 people along its path, with 10 people injured in Stone County and 37 people injured in Taney County within the city of Branson. The majority of the injuries were minor to moderate, mostly consisting of cuts and bruises. One person sustained critical injuries after a roof collapse, and several individuals were injured by shattered glass.

== See also ==
- Weather of 2012
- Joplin tornado – a devastating EF5 tornado that occurred in similar regions less than a year prior
