= Leatherwood =

Leatherwood may refer to:

== Plants ==
- Cyrilla, a plant genus of tropical to warm temperate Americas
- Dirca, a plant genus of temperate North America
- Eucryphia lucida, a plant species of Tasmania
- Macrolearia colensoi, a plant endemic to New Zealand

== Places ==
- Leatherwood Plantation, a Virginia plantation once owned by Patrick Henry
- Leatherwood, Kentucky, an area in Perry County, Kentucky
- Leatherwood, Tennessee

== Other uses ==
- Leatherwood (surname)

== See also ==
- Leatherwood Creek (disambiguation)
