= Dave Wommack =

American football player and coach (born 1956)

Biographical details
- Born: May 9, 1956 (age 70); Kimberling City, Missouri, U.S.

Playing career
- 1974–1977: Missouri Southern State
- Position: Center

Coaching career (HC unless noted)
- 1979–1980: Arkansas (GA)
- 1981–1982: Arkansas (WR)
- 1983–1984: Missouri (DL)
- 1985: Bemidji State (DC)
- 1986–1991: Southwest Missouri State (DC)
- 1992–1993: UNLV (DC)
- 1994–1998: Southern Miss (DB)
- 1999-2000: Southern Miss (AHC/DC)
- 2001: Arkansas (DB)
- 2002–2004: Arkansas (DC)
- 2005: South Carolina (DB)
- 2006: South Carolina (OLB)
- 2007: Southern Miss (LB)
- 2008–2009: Georgia Tech (DC)
- 2011: Arkansas State (DC/S)
- 2012–2014: Ole Miss (DC/S)
- 2015–2016: Ole Miss (DC/LB)

Dave Wommack (born May 9, 1956) is an American former college football coach. He served as the defensive coordinator at Georgia Tech from 2008 to 2009, Arkansas State University in 2011, and the University of Mississippi from 2012 to 2016. Wommack retired after the 2016 season.

== Personal life ==
A native of Kimberling City, Missouri, Wommack played football at Missouri Southern State University. Wommack lettered three years, as a center. He is married with two children, one being current Alabama defensive coordinator Kane Wommack.
