= Spring Hollow Township, Laclede County, Missouri =

Inactive township in the American state of Missouri

Coordinates: 37.7044°N 92.7706°W

Spring Hollow Township is an inactive township in Laclede County, in the U.S. state of Missouri.

Spring Hollow Township was established in 1874, taking its name from a valley of the same name within its borders.
