= Bevier, Kentucky =

Unincorporated community in Kentucky, United States

- Unincorporated community
- Location within Kentucky Location within the United States
- Coordinates: 37°14′40″N 87°4′55″W
- Country: United States
- State: Kentucky
- County: Muhlenberg
- Elevation: 417 ft (127 m)
- Time zone: UTC-6 (Central (CST))
  - Summer (DST): UTC-5 (CST)
- GNIS feature ID: 507504

Bevier (/bəˈvɪər/) is an unincorporated community in Muhlenberg County, Kentucky, United States. It is part of the Cleaton census-designated place.

== History ==
A post office called Bevier was established in 1882, and remained in operation until it was discontinued in 1952. The community was named for Robert S. Bevier, a railroad official.
