= Holt, Muhlenberg County, Kentucky =

Unincorporated community in Kentucky, United States

Holt, Kentucky
- Unincorporated community
- Location within Kentucky Location within the United States
- Coordinates: 37°15′21″N 87°05′45″W
- Country: United States
- State: Kentucky
- County: Muhlenberg
- Elevation: 469 ft (143 m)
- Time zone: UTC-6 (Central (CST))
  - Summer (DST): UTC-5 (CDT)
- Area code: 270
- GNIS feature ID: 494437

Holt is an unincorporated community in Muhlenberg County, Kentucky, United States. It is part of the Cleaton census-designated place. Holt is located near U.S. Route 431, 3 miles (4.8 km) south-southeast of Central City.

Holt was named for a businessperson in the coal mining industry.
