= Mayfield Creek =

Stream in the American state of Missouri

Coordinates: 37°26′42″N 89°55′38″W

Mayfield Creek is a stream in Bollinger County in the U.S. state of Missouri. The stream is a tributary to the Little Whitewater Creek. The community of Mayfield, Missouri lies approximately one mile to the northwest of the confluence on another small tributary to the Little Whitewater.

Mayfield Creek bears the name of a local family of settlers; this family is also the namesake of Mayfield, Kentucky.

== See also ==
- List of rivers of Missouri
