= Spring Hollow Creek =

Stream in the U.S.state of Missouri

Spring Hollow Creek is a stream in Dallas and Laclede counties in the U.S. state of Missouri. It is a tributary of the Niangua River.

The stream headwaters arise in Laclede County just north of the Burlington Northern Railroad and Interstate 44 about 2.5 miles northeast of Phillipsburg. The stream flows northwest passing under Missouri Route 32 to enter Bennett Spring State Park where it gathers the waters of Bennett Spring, and enters the Niangua River.

The stream source area is at 37°35′08″N 92°45′46″W and its confluence is at 37°44′02″N 92°51′39″W.

Spring Hollow Creek was named for the surrounding valley where springs occur.

== See also ==
- List of rivers of Missouri
