= Leatherwood Creek =

Leatherwood Creek may refer to:

- Leatherwood Creek (St. Francis River), a stream in Missouri
- Leatherwood Creek (Tawana Creek), a stream in Ohio
- Leatherwood Creek (Wills Creek), a stream in Ohio
- Leatherwood Creek (Virginia)
