= Leatherwood Creek (St. Francis River tributary) =

Stream in the US state of Missouri

Leatherwood Creek is a stream in Iron and Madison County in the U.S. state of Missouri. It is a tributary of St. Francis River.

The stream headwaters arise in southeastern Iron County and it flows southeast into western Madison County parallel to Missouri Route C past the community of Jewett to its confluence with the St. Francis about four miles southwest of Rock Pile Mountain.

The source area is at 37°25′39″N 90°33′23″W and the confluence is at 37°22′53″N 90°28′37″W.

Leatherwood Creek was named for leatherwood near its course.

== See also ==
- List of rivers of Missouri
