= Leatherwood (surname) =

Leatherwood is a surname. Notable people with the surname include:

- Alex Leatherwood (born 1998), American football player
- Bryce Leatherwood (born 2000), American country singer
- Elmer O. Leatherwood (1872–1929), American politician
- Gavin Leatherwood (born 1994), American actor and singer
- Frank Leatherwood (born 1977), American football player
- Lillie Leatherwood (born 1964), American athlete
- Ray Leatherwood (1914–1996), American jazz double-bassist
- Robert N. Leatherwood (1844–1920), American businessman
- Tom Leatherwood (born 1956), American politician
