= Weather of 2012 =

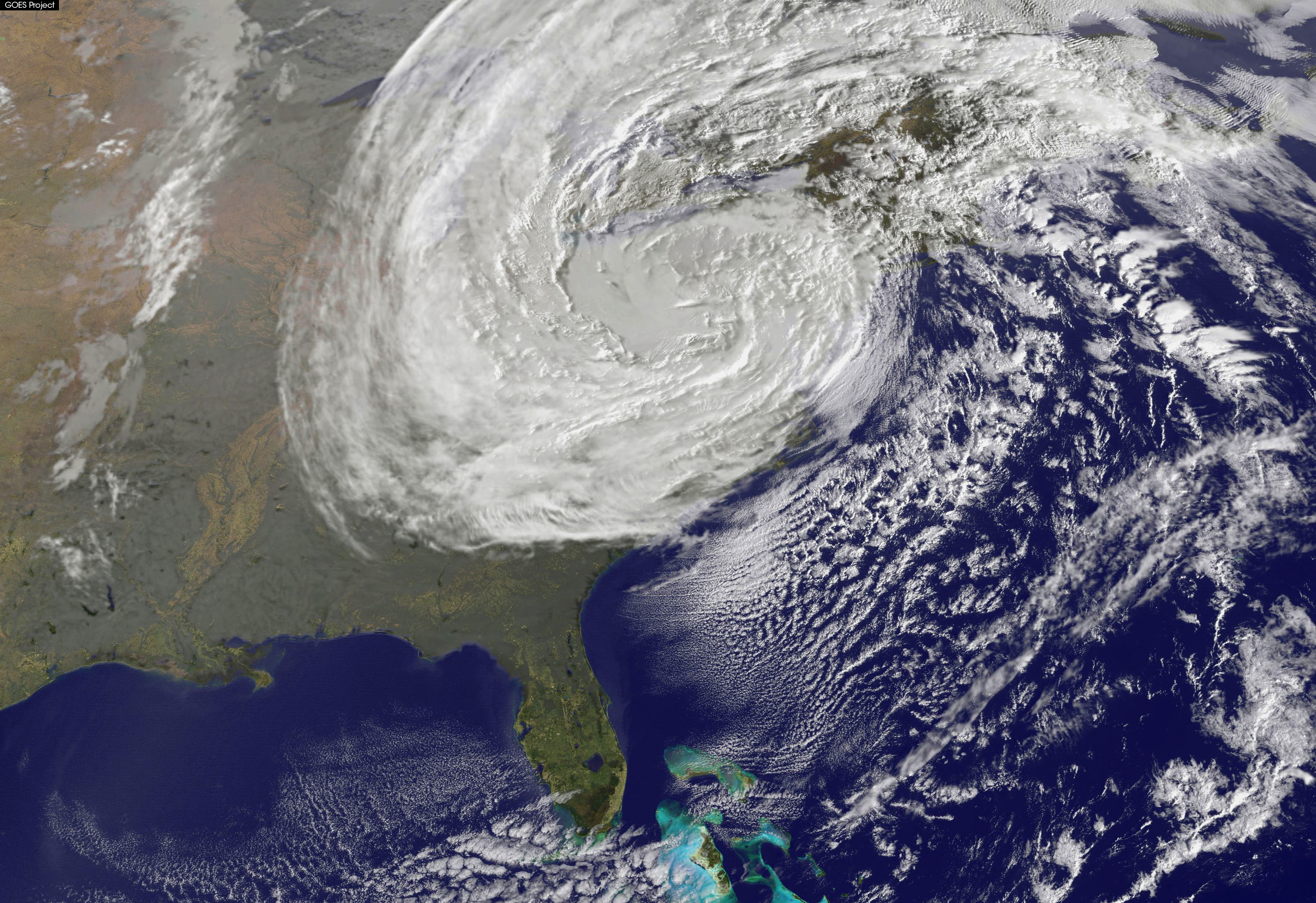
Former Hurricane Sandy over the northeastern United States

2012 marked the fewest fatalities from natural disasters in a decade in meteorology, although there were several damaging and deadly floods, tropical cyclones, tornadoes, and other weather events. These include blizzards, cold waves, droughts, heat waves, and wildfires.

The costliest single weather event of the year was Hurricane Sandy, which struck the northeastern United States in late October, with overall economic costs estimated at over US$67 billion.

== Overview ==
The year began with La Niña conditions, meaning cooler than normal waters in the eastern Pacific Ocean near the equator. By later in the year, the global weather pattern shifted to more neutral conditions. The global temperature was 1.03 °F (−17.21 °C) above average, making it the tenth-warmest year ever recorded.

Throughout 2012, there were 9,655 people killed by natural disasters, which marked the fewest global fatalities in a decade. This included 3,574 deaths related to hydrological events. The lower than usual death toll was due to fewer flooding and cyclonic events. Asia was the continent most often affected during the year.

=== Deadliest events ===
Deadliest meteorological events during 2012
Rank	Event	Date(s)	Deaths (+Missing)	Refs
1	Typhoon Bopha	December 3	1,901	
2	Pakistan monsoonal floods	September–October	455	
3	Hurricane Sandy	October 22–29	233	
4	Krasnodar Krai floods	July 7	172	
5	Rwanda landslides	May	131	
6	Monsoonal floods in Assam, India	June 26	122	
7	Ukraine cold wave	January	112	
8				
9				
10				

== Types ==
The following listed different types of special weather conditions worldwide.

=== Cold snaps and winter storms ===
In January, cold temperatures of −30 °C (−22 °F) killed 112 people in Ukraine, while avalanches and a cold wave killed 45 people across Afghanistan.

=== Floods ===
Throughout the year, floods killed 673 people in China, including July flash floods in Beijing which killed 79 people and left 10¥billion (US$1.6 billion) in damage. In May, floods and landslides killed 131 people in Rwanda. In June, monsoonal floods in northern India killed 122 people. In early July, a low pressure area in the Black Sea dropped 280 mm (11 in) of rainfall in a few hours in parts of southwestern Russia, causing flash flooding that killed 172 people. In September, monsoonal floods in Pakistan killed 455 people.

=== Heat waves and droughts ===
Drought conditions persisted across much of North America throughout the year, causing at least US$39.9 billion in damage, much of it from crop failures. A strong heat wave during the summer killed 129 people.

Elsewhere, drought conditions in northeast Brazil led to their government allocating R$2.7 billion (US$1.35 billion) worth of assistance for farmers and water distribution.

=== Tornadoes ===
During the year, 939 tornadoes were confirmed to have touch down in the United States, which is lower than the year prior. 4 EF4 tornadoes touched down in the country, the strongest tornado of the year occurred on February 29, with winds up to 180 miles per hour, it struck Harrisburg, Illinois. The 2 deadliest tornadoes of the year killed 10 people each as they struck Henryville, Indiana and West Liberty, Kentucky both on March 2. The Henryville tornado was rated as an EF4 with winds up to 175 miles per hour, while the West Liberty tornado was rated as an EF3 with estimated wind speeds up to 140-150 miles per hour. The most notable tornado outbreak occurred on March 2-3, where a severe weather outbreak of 75 tornadoes killed 42 people and inflicted US$4.1 billion in damage across the southeastern United States and into the Ohio Valley.

=== Tropical and subtropical cyclones ===
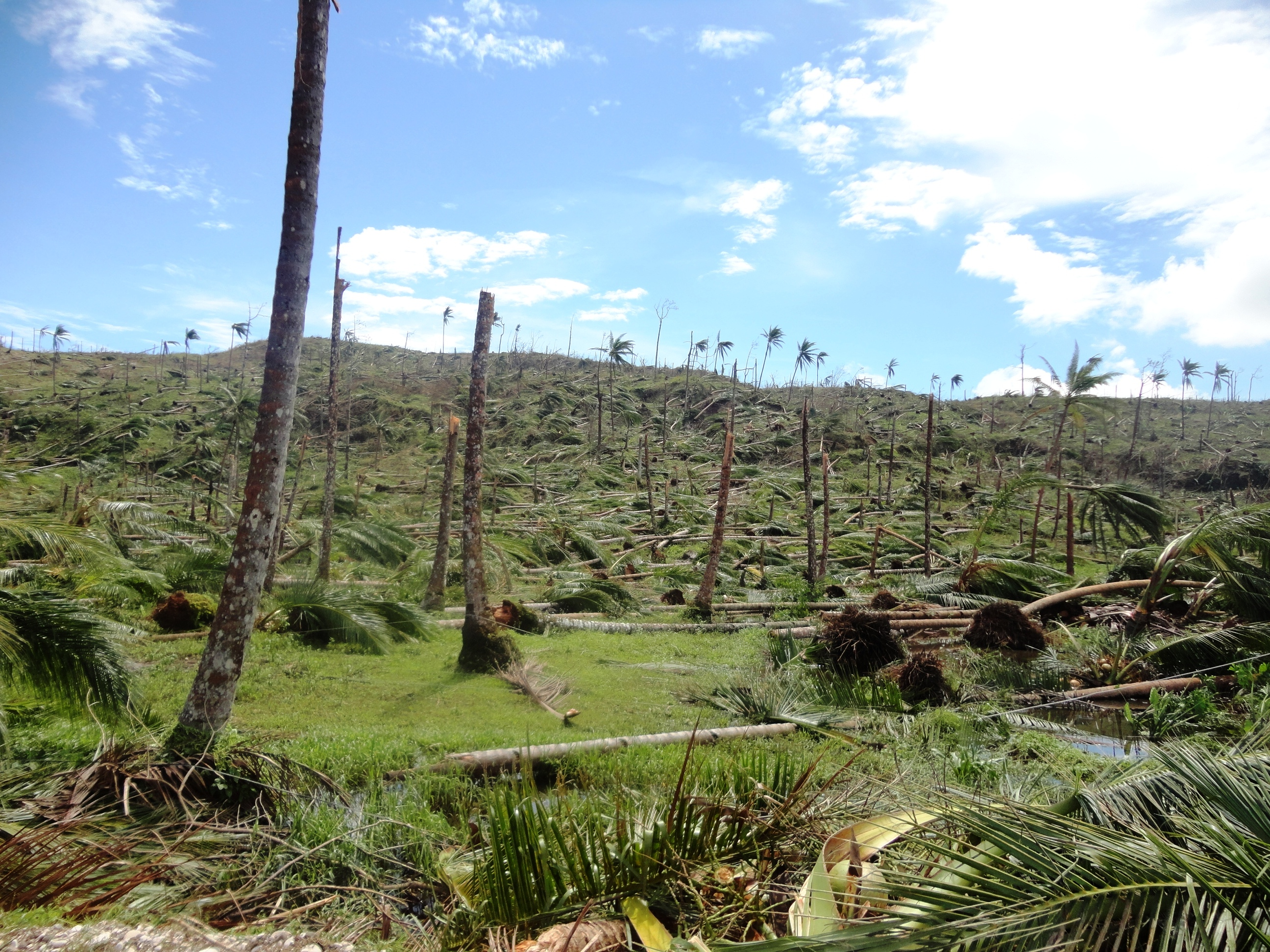
Damage from Typhoon Bopha (locally known as Super Typhoon Pablo) in Davao Oriental in the southeastern Philippines

At the start of the year, Tropical Cyclone Benilde was moving across the south-west Indian Ocean. The strongest tropical cyclone worldwide in 2012 was Typhoon Sanba in the western Pacific Ocean. On September 13, the Joint Typhoon Warning Center (JTWC) estimated maximum sustained winds of 285 km/h (180 mph). The costliest storm of the year was Hurricane Sandy, which formed in October in the Caribbean Sea; after moving across Cuba, Sandy later evolved into a large extratropical cyclone that struck New Jersey, causing $65 billion in damage across the northeastern United States. Much of the damage was in the New York City metropolitan area, with train service disrupted for several weeks. The deadliest storm of the year was Typhoon Bopha, which killed 1,901 people and left US$1.16 billion in damage after it struck the Philippine island of Mindanao on December 3. As the year ended, there were two tropical cyclones that lasted into early 2013 – Cyclone Freda in the South Pacific Ocean, and Tropical Cyclone Dumile in the south-west Indian Ocean.

In the Atlantic, there were 19 tropical storms, of which 10 became hurricanes, attaining winds of at least 120 km/h (75 mph). In the eastern Pacific, there were 17 tropical storms, of which 10 became hurricanes. The North Indian Ocean was inactive, with only five tropical cyclones, of which two became cyclonic storms.

=== Wildfires ===
Throughout the year, wildfires in the United States burned more than 9,200,000 acres (37,000 km^{2}) of land, killing eight people and causing US$2.3 billion in damage.

=== Extratropical cyclones and other weather systems ===
In late June, a costly and deadly derecho moved across the eastern United States, leaving 4.2 million people without power. The strong winds caused US$3.8 billion in damage and resulted in 28 fatalities.

== Timeline ==
This is a timeline of deadly weather events during 2012.

=== January ===
- January – A cold wave across Europe produced temperatures of −30 °C (−22 °F) in Ukraine, killing 112 people.
- January – March – Flooding in Bolivia killed 13 people.
- January 5–10 – Tropical Storm Chanda struck western Madagascar, killing one person.
- January 9–12 – Floods and landslides in northern Brazil killed 17 people.
- Mid-January – Avalanches and a cold wave killed 45 people across Afghanistan.
- January 17 – Subtropical Depression Dando made landfall in extreme southern Mozambique, the first storm to hit the southern portion of the country since 1984. The storm's rains killed four people in Mozambique and another six in South Africa. Damage in South Africa was around $65 million.
- January 17–28 – Cyclone Funso formed and looped around the Mozambique Channel, bringing additional rainfall and floods after Dando struck Mozambique. The two storms collectively killed 40 people in Mozambique.
- January 20–24 – A weak tropical disturbance in the South Pacific produced heavy rainfall over Fiji, causing flooding and landslides that killed eight people.
- January 21 – Tropical Storm Ethel killed one person while passing near Rodrigues in the south-west Indian Ocean.
- January 24 – February 3 – A weather disturbance produced floods and tornadoes in Indonesia, killing 16 people. The disturbance would eventually become Tropical Cyclone Iggy in the eastern Indian Ocean, eventually striking Western Australia as a weakened storm.
- January 24 – A landslide in Papua New Guinea killed at least 25 people.

=== February ===
- February – Across Afghanistan, 54 children died of hypothermia following a cold wave.
- February 7–24 – Cyclone Giovanna passed north of the Mascarene Islands, killing one person each on Réunion and Mauritius. The powerful cyclone later struck eastern Madagascar, killing 35 people, with more than 44,000 houses destroyed.
- February 9–13 – Floods killed four people across the Philippines.
- February 25 – March 12 – Tropical Storm Irina moved across Madagascar, with its landslides and floods killing 72 people and leaving 70,000 people homeless. Later, Irina looped off southeastern Africa, causing 12 deaths between Mozambique and South Africa.
- February 28–29 – 2012 Leap Day tornado outbreak

=== March ===
- March–May – Rains and floods killed 22 people in Haiti.
- March 2–3 – A severe weather outbreak of 75 tornadoes killed 42 people and inflicted US$4.1 billion in damage across the southeastern United States and into the Ohio Valley.
- March 20 – An avalanche killed 17 people in northeastern Afghanistan.
- March 30 – Heavy rains from Tropical Depression 17F killed four people in Fiji.

=== April ===
- April – Floods and landslides killed 84 people in Kenya.
- April 4 – A windstorm killed 17 people in the Buenos Aires area of Argentina.
- April 13–16 – A severe weather outbreak of 98 tornadoes killed six people and caused US$1.5 billion in damage across the midwest of the United States.
- April 20 – Strong winds and rains caused a house to collapse in northern Vietnam, killing two people.
- April 20 – Heavy rains in the Comoros killed four people.
- April 23 – Heavy rains killed one person in the Democratic Republic of the Congo.

=== May ===
- May 2–3 – Flooding and landslides killed 127 people in Rwanda.
- May 5 – A landslide caused flash flooding in Nepal along the Seti River, killing at least 34 people.
- May 12–13 – Flooding and landslides killed five people in the country of Georgia.
- May 17–22 – Flash floods in Afghanistan killed 17 people.
- May 28 – Tropical Storm Beryl made landfall in northeastern Florida, becoming the strongest pre-season Atlantic tropical cyclone to strike the United States. The storm killed two people.

=== June ===
- June 14–17 – Hurricane Carlotta hit the southern coast of Mexico, killing seven people.
- June 23–30 – Tropical Storm Debby dropped heavy rainfall and caused a tornado outbreak across the southeastern United States, resulting in eight deaths.
- June 26 – Monsoonal floods began in the Indian state of Assam, killing 122 people.
- June 29–30 – A derecho moved eastward across the United States, killing 28 people and leaving US$3.8 billion in damage.

=== July ===
- July 7 – A low pressure area in the Black Sea dropped torrential rainfall in southwestern Russia, killing 172 people.
- July 21 – Flash floods in Beijing killed 79 people and left 10¥billion (US$1.6 billion) in damage.

=== August ===
- August 1–10 – Hurricane Ernesto moved through the Caribbean Sea, hitting Mexico twice, causing 12 fatalities.
- August 3 – A cloudburst in northern India caused flash floods that killed 35 people.
- August 11 – Landslides on Trinidad killed two people, related to a tropical wave that would eventually become Tropical Storm Helene.
- August 21 – September 3 – Hurricane Isaac moved through the Caribbean and Gulf of Mexico, eventually striking Louisiana; the hurricane killed at least 34 people and left more than US$2 billion in damage along its path.

=== September ===
- September – Monsoonal floods in Pakistan killed 455 people.
- September – Heavy rains in Vietnam killed 16 people.
- September 10–19 – Typhoon Sanba, the strongest cyclone worldwide in 2012, took a generally northward path through the western Pacific Ocean, making landfall on South Korea on September 17.
- September 30 – Rainfall associated with Hurricane Miriam caused floods in Texas, killing one person.

=== October ===
- October 10–11 – A deep depression killed 34 people when it hit Bangladesh.
- October 12–17 – Hurricane Rafael moved from the Caribbean to the open Atlantic Ocean, killing one person on Guadeloupe.
- October 22–29 – Shortly after transitioning into an extratropical cyclone, former Hurricane Sandy made landfall near Brigantine, New Jersey. Its large wind field caused $65 billion in damage across the northeastern United States, as well $2 billion in damage in Cuba. Along its path, Sandy killed 233 people.
- October 28 – November 1 – Cyclone Nilam looped off northeastern Sri Lanka before striking southern India, killing at least 71 people.

=== December ===
- December 3 – Typhoon Bopha strikes Mindanao in the southeastern Philippines, killing 1,901 people.
- December 9–27 – Cyclone Evan moved across the South Pacific, striking Samoa and Fiji, killing 14 people.

Global weather by year
Preceded by 2011	Weather of 2012	Succeeded by 2013
