= Schofield, Missouri =

Unincorporated community in Missouri, U.S.

Coordinates: 37°33′08″N 93°12′24″W

Schofield is an unincorporated community in Polk County, in the U.S. state of Missouri.

== History ==
A post office called Schofield was established in 1887, and remained in operation until 1907. The community has the name of an early settler.
