= Lake Spring, Missouri =

Unincorporated community in Dent County, Missouri

Lake Spring
- Unincorporated community
- Location within Missouri
- Coordinates: 37°46′57″N 91°40′44″W
- Country: United States
- State: Missouri
- County: Dent County
- Time zone: UTC-6 (Central (CST))
  - Summer (DST): UTC-5 (CDT)

Lake Spring is an unincorporated community in northwest Dent County, Missouri, United States. It is located approximately twelve miles (19 km) southeast of Rolla on Route 72. A post office called Lake Spring has been in operation since 1856. The community was named after a nearby pool of water fed by a spring. The Hyer Woods Conservation Area composes approximately 30 acres (12 ha) in the Lake Spring community.
