= Windsor, Kentucky =

Windsor
- Unincorporated community
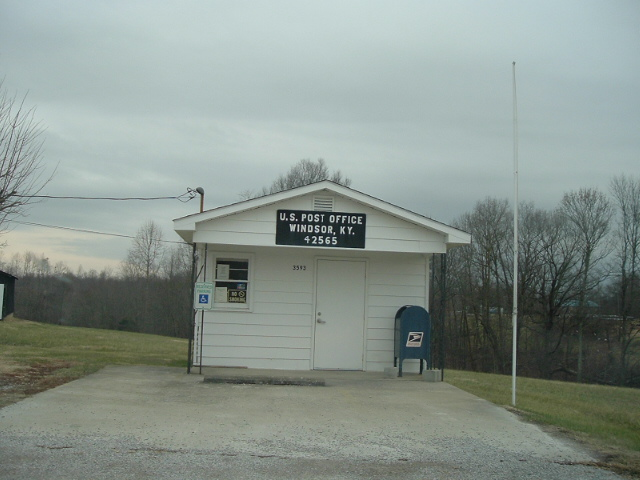
- Windsor Post Office in 2006

- Location within the state of Kentucky Windsor (the United States)
- Coordinates: 37°7′40″N 85°54′44″W
- Country: United States
- State: Kentucky
- County: Casey
- Elevation: 1,155 ft (352 m)
- Time zone: UTC-6 (Eastern Time Zone)
  - Summer (DST): UTC-5 (EST)
- ZIP codes: 42565
- GNIS feature ID: 509382

Windsor is an unincorporated community in southern Casey County, Kentucky, United States. Their post office is active.
