= Mayfield, Missouri =

Unincorporated community in Missouri, U.S.

- Unincorporated community
- Location of Bollinger County, Missouri
- Coordinates: 37°27′15″N 89°56′57″W
- Country: United States
- State: Missouri
- County: Bollinger
- Township: Scopus
- Time zone: UTC-6 (Central (CST))
  - Summer (DST): UTC-5 (CDT)
- Area code: 573

Mayfield is an unincorporated community in the central part of Scopus Township in Bollinger County, Missouri, United States, approximately 4.5 miles west of the Cape Girardeau County line.

The community was located along a small tributary of the Little Whitewater Creek and Mayfield Creek flows past approximately three-quarters of a mile to the south.

Mayfield had been named by W.H. Mayfield, who had established the post office in 1886. A number of post offices came and went over the years: 1882–1891, 1899–1909, 1912–1955.
