= Jewett, Missouri =

Unincorporated community in Missouri, U.S.

Coordinates: 37°22′49″N 90°30′05″W

Jewett is an unincorporated community in southwest Madison County, in the U.S. state of Missouri.

The community is situated on Missouri Route C, adjacent to Leatherwood Creek and is two miles west of the St. Francis River.

== History ==
A post office called Jewett was established in 1872, and remained in operation until 1948. The identity of namesake Jewett is unknown.
