= Malone, Kentucky =

Unincorporated community in Kentucky, United States

- Unincorporated community
- Location within Kentucky Location within the United States
- Coordinates: 37°52′19″N 83°15′30″W
- Country: United States
- State: Kentucky
- County: Morgan
- Elevation: 797 ft (243 m)
- Time zone: UTC-5 (Eastern (EST))
  - Summer (DST): UTC-4 (EDT)
- ZIP codes: 41451
- GNIS feature ID: 508527

Malone (also Mudville) is an unincorporated community in Morgan County, Kentucky, United States. It lies along Route 191 south of the city of West Liberty, the county seat of Morgan County. Its elevation is 797 feet (242 m). It has a post office with the ZIP code 41451.
