= Cleaton, Kentucky =

Unincorporated community in Kentucky, United States

- Census-designated place
- Location within Kentucky Location within the United States
- Coordinates: 37°15′16″N 87°5′20″W
- Country: United States
- State: Kentucky
- County: Muhlenberg

Area
  - Total: 0.62 sq mi (1.61 km^{2})
  - Land: 0.62 sq mi (1.61 km^{2})
  - Water: 0.0039 sq mi (0.01 km^{2})
- Elevation: 440 ft (130 m)

Population (2020)
  - Total: 168
  - Density: 271.1/sq mi (104.67/km^{2})
- Time zone: UTC-6 (Central (CST))
  - Summer (DST): UTC-5 (CST)
- ZIP code: 42332
- FIPS code: 21-15490
- GNIS feature ID: 489650

Cleaton is an unincorporated community and census-designated place in Muhlenberg County, Kentucky, United States. As of the 2020 census, it had a population of 168.

== History ==
A post office called Cleaton has been in operation since 1901. The name Cleaton was the middle name of the wife of the postmaster.

== Geography ==
Cleaton is in eastern Muhlenberg County northeast of U.S. Route 431, which forms the western edge of the community. The neighborhood of Holt is in the northern part of the CDP, while Bevier is in the southern part. US 431 leads northwest 3.5 miles (5.6 km) to Central City and southeast 4 miles (6 km) to Drakesboro. Greenville, the county seat, is 6 miles (10 km) to the southwest.

According to the U.S. Census Bureau, the Cleaton CDP has an area of 0.62 square miles (1.61 km^{2}), of which 0.003 square miles (0.008 km^{2}), or 0.48%, are water. The community is drained to the southeast by a tributary of Pond Creek, which flows north to the Green River.

== Demographics ==
Historical population
Census	Pop.	Note	%±
2020	168		—
U.S. Decennial Census
