= Asherville, Missouri =

Unincorporated community in Missouri, U.S.

Coordinates: 36°53′55″N 90°11′14″W

Asherville is an unincorporated community in Stoddard County, in the U.S. state of Missouri.

== History ==
A post office called Asherville was established in 1872, and remained in operation until 1927. The community was named after a pioneer citizen.

In 1925, Asherville had 116 inhabitants.
