= Grassy Creek, Kentucky =

Unincorporated community in Kentucky, United States

- Unincorporated community
- Location within Kentucky Location within the United States
- Coordinates: 37°52′1″N 83°20′43″W
- Country: United States
- State: Kentucky
- County: Morgan
- Elevation: 787 ft (240 m)
- Time zone: UTC-5 (Eastern (EST))
  - Summer (DST): UTC-4 (EDT)
- ZIP codes: 41435
- GNIS feature ID: 508121

Grassy Creek is an unincorporated community in Morgan County, Kentucky, United States. It lies along U.S. Route 460, southwest of the city of West Liberty, the county seat of Morgan County. Its elevation is 787 feet (240 m).

A post office was established in the community in 1858, and named for an early settler's hometown of Grassy Creek, North Carolina.
