= Nashville, Missouri =

Unincorporated community in Missouri, U.S.

- unincorporated community
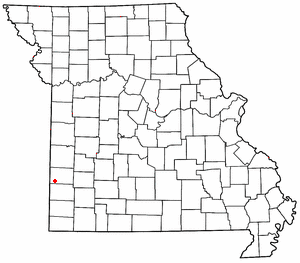
- Coordinates: 37°22′30″N 94°29′30″W
- Country: United States
- State: Missouri
- County: Barton

Area
  - Total: 48.6 sq mi (125.9 km^{2})
  - Land: 48.5 sq mi (125.6 km^{2})
  - Water: 0.12 sq mi (0.3 km^{2})
- Elevation: 955 ft (291 m)

Population (2000)
  - Total: 396
  - Density: 8.3/sq mi (3.2/km^{2})
- Time zone: UTC-6 (Central (CST))
  - Summer (DST): UTC-5 (CDT)
- FIPS code: 29-51248
- GNIS feature ID: 0723124

Nashville is a small unincorporated community in southwestern Barton County one mile north of the Barton-Jasper county line, near the western border of Missouri, United States. It is on Missouri Route AA one mile west of Route 43. The community is approximately twelve miles southwest of Lamar and 22 miles north of Joplin.

Developed in a rural, farming area, Nashville was platted in 1869 after the American Civil War. The name is a transfer from Nashville, Tennessee. A post office called Nashville had been established in 1861, and remained in operation until 1959.

Harlow Shapley was born at Nashville in 1885. He became a notable American astronomer and was director of the Harvard College Observatory (1921–1952).
