= Phillipsburg, Missouri =

- Village
- Old Phillipsburg General Store Redmon's Candy Factory

- Location of Phillipsburg, Missouri
- Coordinates: 37°33′09″N 92°47′14″W
- Country: United States
- State: Missouri
- County: Laclede

Area
  - Total: 0.80 sq mi (2.07 km^{2})
  - Land: 0.80 sq mi (2.07 km^{2})
  - Water: 0 sq mi (0.00 km^{2})
- Elevation: 1,408 ft (429 m)

Population (2020)
  - Total: 164
  - Density: 205.7/sq mi (79.41/km^{2})
- Time zone: UTC-6 (Central (CST))
  - Summer (DST): UTC-5 (CDT)
- ZIP code: 65722
- Area code: 417
- FIPS code: 29-57368
- GNIS feature ID: 2399663

Phillipsburg is a village in Laclede County, Missouri, United States. As of the 2020 census, Phillipsburg had a population of 164. It is home to Redmon’s Candy Factory and the World’s Largest Gift Store.

== History ==
A post office called Phillipsburg has been in operation since 1871. The community was named after Rufus Phillips, a local merchant.

== Geography ==
According to the United States Census Bureau, the village has a total area of 0.80 square miles (2.07 km^{2}), all land.

== Demographics ==
Historical population
Census	Pop.	Note	%±
1920	248		—
1930	212		−14.5%
1940	194		−8.5%
1950	170		−12.4%
1960	142		−16.5%
1970	173		21.8%
1980	134		−22.5%
1990	170		26.9%
2000	201		18.2%
2010	202		0.5%
2020	164		−18.8%
U.S. Decennial Census

=== 2010 census ===
As of the census of 2010, there were 202 people, 72 households, and 53 families living in the village. The population density was 252.5 inhabitants per square mile (97.5/km^{2}). There were 82 housing units at an average density of 102.5 per square mile (39.6/km^{2}). The racial makeup of the village was 99.0% White and 1.0% from two or more races. Hispanic or Latino of any race were 0.5% of the population.

There were 72 households, of which 41.7% had children under the age of 18 living with them, 50.0% were married couples living together, 11.1% had a female householder with no husband present, 12.5% had a male householder with no wife present, and 26.4% were non-families. 23.6% of all households were made up of individuals, and 7% had someone living alone who was 65 years of age or older. The average household size was 2.81 and the average family size was 3.13.

The median age in the village was 31.8 years. 34.2% of residents were under the age of 18; 4.9% were between the ages of 18 and 24; 28.7% were from 25 to 44; 21.8% were from 45 to 64; and 10.4% were 65 years of age or older. The gender makeup of the village was 45.0% male and 55.0% female.

=== 2000 census ===
As of the census of 2000, there were 201 people, 73 households, and 55 families living in the village. The population density was 394.4 inhabitants per square mile (152.3/km^{2}). There were 85 housing units at an average density of 166.8 per square mile (64.4/km^{2}). The racial makeup of the village was 87.56% White, 1.49% Native American, 1.00% Asian, 2.49% Pacific Islander, 2.49% from other races, and 4.98% from two or more races. Hispanic or Latino of any race were 5.47% of the population.

There were 73 households, out of which 35.6% had children under the age of 18 living with them, 54.8% were married couples living together, 12.3% had a female householder with no husband present, and 23.3% were non-families. 20.5% of all households were made up of individuals, and 11.0% had someone living alone who was 65 years of age or older. The average household size was 2.75 and the average family size was 3.11.

In the village, the population was spread out, with 28.9% under the age of 18, 18.9% from 18 to 24, 20.9% from 25 to 44, 20.4% from 45 to 64, and 10.9% who were 65 years of age or older. The median age was 28 years. For every 100 females, there were 118.5 males. For every 100 females age 18 and over, there were 120.0 males.

The median income for a household in the village was $21,875, and the median income for a family was $25,938. Males had a median income of $21,250 versus $18,036 for females. The per capita income for the village was $9,083. About 32.7% of families and 40.4% of the population were below the poverty line, including 67.2% of those under the age of eighteen and 26.1% of those 65 or over.
