= Kissee Mills, Missouri =

- Census-Designated Place
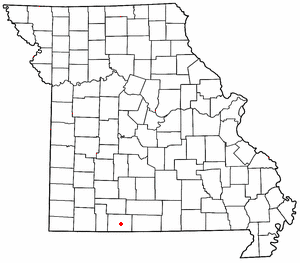
- Location of Kissee Mills in Missouri
- Coordinates: 36°40′10″N 93°02′50″W
- Country: United States
- State: Missouri
- County: Taney

Area
  - Total: 9.34 sq mi (24.18 km^{2})
  - Land: 8.80 sq mi (22.78 km^{2})
  - Water: 0.54 sq mi (1.40 km^{2})
- Elevation: 945 ft (288 m)

Population (2020)
  - Total: 1,023
  - Density: 116/sq mi (44.9/km^{2})
- ZIP code: 65680
- Area code: 417
- FIPS code: 29-39080
- GNIS feature ID: 2587084

Kissee Mills (pronounced "Kiz-zē' Mills") is a census-designated place in Taney County, Missouri, United States. It is located on U.S. Route 160, approximately five miles east of Forsyth. Kissee Mills is part of the Branson, Missouri Micropolitan Statistical Area. As of the 2020 census, Kissee Mills had a population of 1,023.

== History ==
A post office called Kissee Mills has been in operation since 1871. The community has the name of A. C. Kissee, the proprietor of a local mill.

== Demographics ==
Historical population
Census	Pop.	Note	%±
2020	1,023		—
U.S. Decennial Census

== Education ==
The CDP is divided between Forsyth R-III School District and Taneyville R-II School District (an elementary school district).
