= Kimberling City, Missouri =

- City
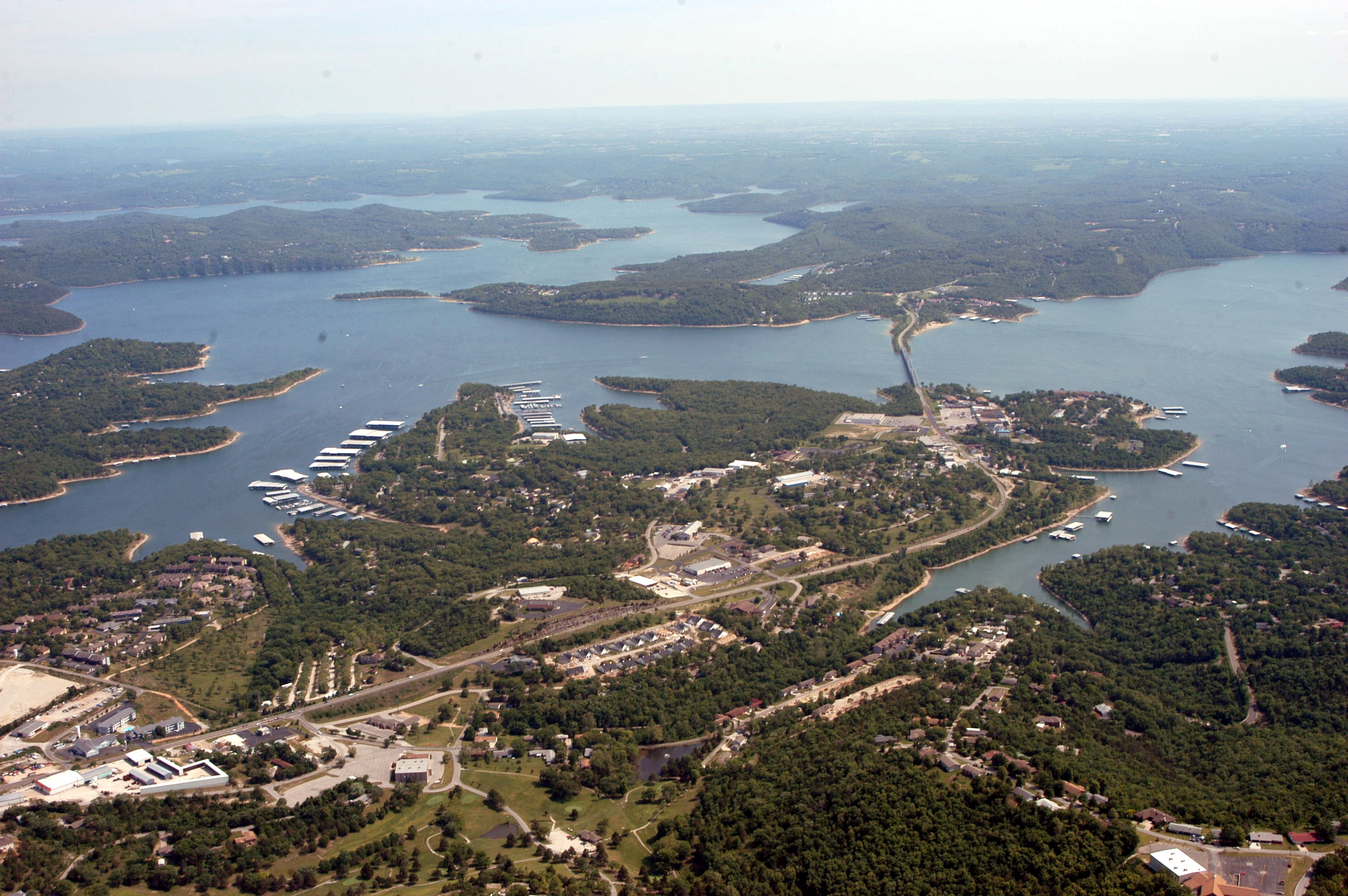

- Location within Stone County and Missouri
- Coordinates: 36°38′31″N 93°25′27″W
- Country: United States
- State: Missouri
- County: Stone

Government
  - Mayor: Robert Fritz

Area
  - Total: 3.86 sq mi (10.00 km^{2})
  - Land: 3.51 sq mi (9.08 km^{2})
  - Water: 0.36 sq mi (0.93 km^{2})
- Elevation: 950 ft (290 m)

Population (2020)
  - Total: 2,344
  - Density: 668.9/sq mi (258.27/km^{2})
- Time zone: UTC-6 (Central (CST))
  - Summer (DST): UTC-5 (CDT)
- ZIP code: 65686
- Area code: 417
- FIPS code: 29-38612
- GNIS ID: 753024
- Website: ckcmo.com

Kimberling City is a city in Stone County, Missouri, United States. The population was 2,344 at the 2020 census.

== History ==
Kimberling City was founded on the shores of Table Rock Lake, a reservoir impounded in the late 1950s. Incorporated in 1973, Kimberling City was named after the Kimberling family, operators of a former nearby ferry.

== Geography ==
Kimberling City is located at 36°38′31″N 93°25′27″W (36.641943, -93.424094). According to the United States Census Bureau, the city has a total area of 3.78 square miles (9.79 km^{2}), of which 3.42 square miles (8.86 km^{2}) is land and 0.36 square miles (0.93 km^{2}) is water.

== Demographics ==
Historical population
| Census | Pop. | Note | %± |
|---|---|---|---|
| 1980 | 1,285 | | — |
| 1990 | 1,590 | | 23.7% |
| 2000 | 2,253 | | 41.7% |
| 2010 | 2,400 | | 6.5% |
| 2020 | 2,344 | | −2.3% |
U.S. Decennial Census

Kimberling City is part of the Branson, Missouri Micropolitan Statistical Area.

=== 2020 census ===
As of the 2020 census, Kimberling City had a population of 2,344. The median age was 59.9 years. 12.3% of residents were under the age of 18 and 39.8% of residents were 65 years of age or older. For every 100 females there were 92.6 males, and for every 100 females age 18 and over there were 89.8 males age 18 and over.

100.0% of residents lived in urban areas, while 0.0% lived in rural areas.

There were 1,119 households in Kimberling City, of which 15.7% had children under the age of 18 living in them. Of all households, 52.9% were married-couple households, 15.8% were households with a male householder and no spouse or partner present, and 26.8% were households with a female householder and no spouse or partner present. About 32.5% of all households were made up of individuals and 19.0% had someone living alone who was 65 years of age or older.

There were 1,435 housing units, of which 22.0% were vacant. The homeowner vacancy rate was 1.5% and the rental vacancy rate was 6.8%.

Racial composition as of the 2020 census
| Race | Number | Percent |
|---|---|---|
| White | 2,122 | 90.5% |
| Black or African American | 10 | 0.4% |
| American Indian and Alaska Native | 23 | 1.0% |
| Asian | 10 | 0.4% |
| Native Hawaiian and Other Pacific Islander | 1 | 0.0% |
| Some other race | 12 | 0.5% |
| Two or more races | 166 | 7.1% |
| Hispanic or Latino (of any race) | 60 | 2.6% |

=== 2010 census ===
As of the census of 2010, there were 2,400 people, 1,147 households, and 774 families living in the city. The population density was 701.8 inhabitants per square mile (271.0/km^{2}). There were 1,431 housing units at an average density of 418.4 per square mile (161.5/km^{2}). The racial makeup of the city was 98.1% White, 0.2% African American, 0.4% Native American, 0.5% Asian, 0.1% from other races, and 0.7% from two or more races. Hispanic or Latino of any race were 1.3% of the population.

There were 1,147 households, of which 16.7% had children under the age of 18 living with them, 58.4% were married couples living together, 6.3% had a female householder with no husband present, 2.8% had a male householder with no wife present, and 32.5% were non-families. 28.3% of all households were made up of individuals, and 17.2% had someone living alone who was 65 years of age or older. The average household size was 2.09 and the average family size was 2.53.

The median age in the city was 57.1 years. 14.4% of residents were under the age of 18; 4% were between the ages of 18 and 24; 15.1% were from 25 to 44; 31.2% were from 45 to 64; and 35.4% were 65 years of age or older. The gender makeup of the city was 46.8% male and 53.2% female.

=== 2000 census ===
As of the census of 2000, there were 2,253 people, 1,045 households, and 760 families living in the city. The population density was 673.6 inhabitants per square mile (260.1/km^{2}). There were 1,236 housing units at an average density of 369.5 per square mile (142.7/km^{2}). The racial makeup of the city was 97.91% White, 0.22% African American, 0.49% Native American, 0.13% Asian, 0.09% Pacific Islander, 0.27% from other races, and 0.89% from two or more races. Hispanic or Latino of any race were 1.11% of the population.

There were 1,045 households, out of which 17.0% had children under the age of 18 living with them, 65.8% were married couples living together, 4.9% had a female householder with no husband present, and 27.2% were non-families. 24.1% of all households were made up of individuals, and 15.1% had someone living alone who was 65 years of age or older. The average household size was 2.16 and the average family size was 2.50.

In the city, the population was spread out, with 15.1% under the age of 18, 4.1% from 18 to 24, 18.9% from 25 to 44, 29.0% from 45 to 64, and 32.9% who were 65 years of age or older. The median age was 54 years. For every 100 females, there were 91.9 males. For every 100 females age 18 and over, there were 88.5 males.

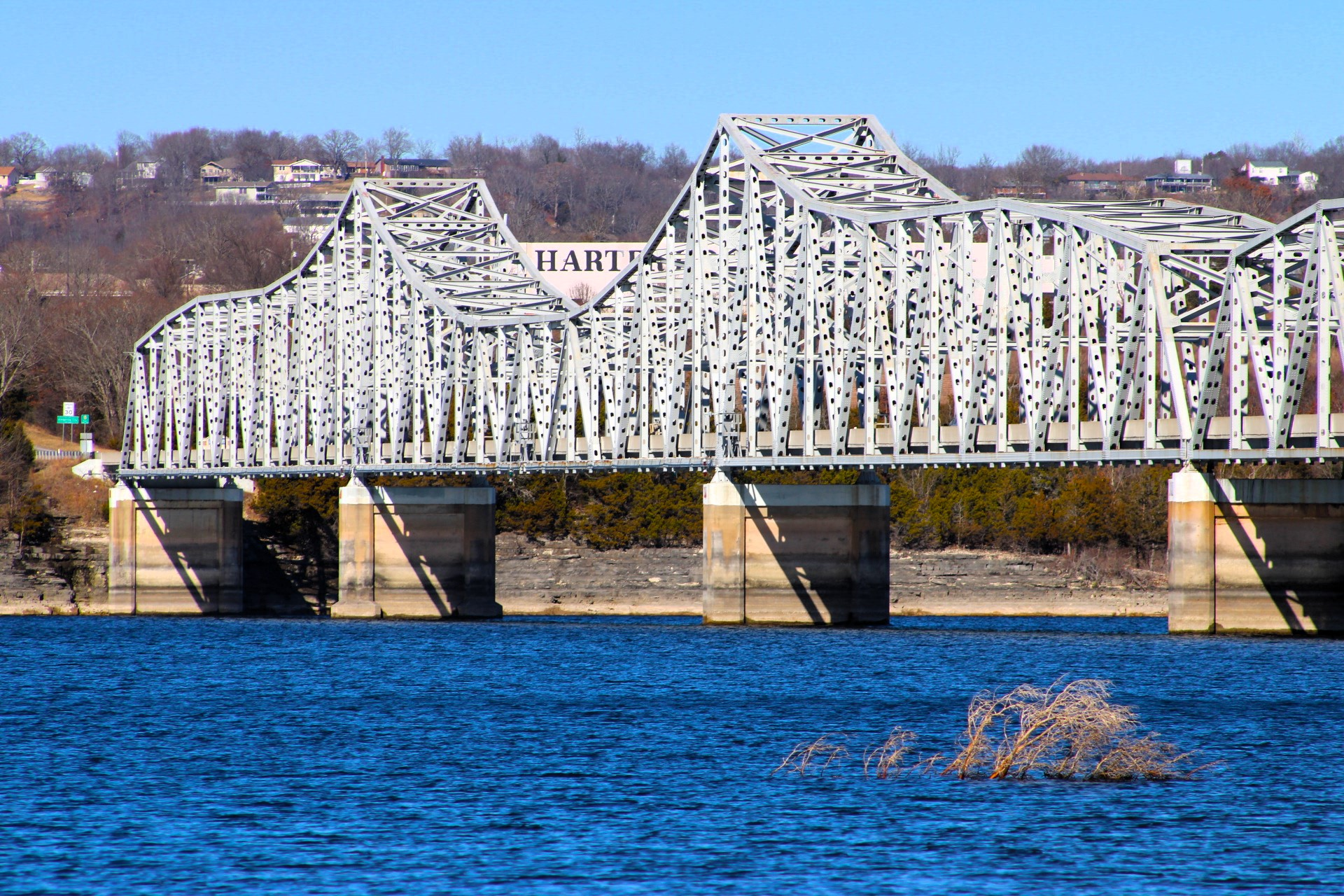
Kimberling City, Missouri bridge which carries highway 13 across Table Rock Lake.

The median income for a household in the city was $36,727, and the median income for a family was $40,508. Males had a median income of $30,774 versus $18,000 for females. The per capita income for the city was $19,715. About 4.5% of families and 6.2% of the population were below the poverty line, including 10.2% of those under age 18 and 3.6% of those age 65 or over.

== Education ==
It is in the Reeds Spring R-IV School District..

Kimberling City has a public library, the Kimberling Area Library.

== Notable people ==
- Dave Duncan, former MLB catcher and pitching coach
- Ned Locke was the beloved ringmaster of Bozo's Circus on WGN-TV in Chicago. After retirement from WGN, Locke moved to Kimberling City and served as mayor and chief of police.
