= Cedar Creek (Sac River tributary) =

Stream in Dade and Cedar counties, Missouri

Cedar Creek is a stream in Dade and Cedar counties of southwest Missouri.

The source of the stream is in Dade County at 37°29′43″N 93°57′11″W and the confluence with the Sac River in Cedar County is at 37°51′03″N 93°49′23″W.

Cedar Creek starts as a small intermittent stream in west central Dade County, northwest of Greenfield and southeast of the community of Sylvania. The stream flows north passing under Missouri Route 97 just to the east of Cedarville and enters Cedar County. The stream meanders north northeast past Jerico Springs and under Missouri Route 32 to the west of Stockton. It continues northeast passing under Missouri Route 39 south of Cedar Springs. It then turns east and enters the Sac River to the north of Caplinger Mills in northeast Cedar County.

Cedar Creek was named for the cedar timber along its course.

== See also ==
- List of rivers of Missouri
