= Flory, Missouri =

Ghost town in Missouri

Flory, Missouri, is a ghost town in extreme northwest Dade County, Missouri, near Cedarville, south and west of the Cedar County town of Jerico Springs, northwest of the community of Sylvania, about a mile east of the Barton County line. Moser's Directory of Missouri Places states that Flory was located about seven and a half miles from Jerico Springs. A 1904 plat map of Dade County places the community at the boundary of survey townships 33 north, range 29 west and 33 north, range 28 west, at the corners of sections 25, 26, 30 and 31.

Flory was established as a trading post around the turn of the 20th century, and bears the name of a popular politician in the state of Missouri at the time, although local newspapers of the era including The Greenfield Vedette, Dade County Advocate, and Lockwood Luminary mention individuals with the surname also living in the area at the time. The settlement had a post office, which Moser's stated was discontinued in 1905, by reason of rural free delivery. Today the area around what was Flory is now in the Jerico Springs ZIP code.

The Flory community was included in Dade County Common School District No. 81, which operated a one-room school known as Rockdale, according the Eighty-Third Annual Report of Public Schools of the State of Missouri from 1932, at which time there were 21 students enrolled in grades first through eighth.

Though references to the community as a way point lingered in local media until after World War II, sources interviewed by Arthur Paul Moser when composing his directory in 1971 said that remnants of Flory were completely gone by that time.

Local media references to Flory as a community include: Dade County Advocate, October 27, 1910; May 4, 1911; May 11, 1911; November 9, 1911; July 4, 1912; Greenfield Vedette, July 22, 1915; October 28, 1915; May 18, 1916; September 7, 1916 (proposal to extend railroad spur); November 16, 1916; May 31, 1917; November 22, 1917; December 5, 1918 (advertisement); December 19, 1918; March 20, 1919; March 27, 1919; February 19, 1920; January 28, 1932; Aug 1 – November 14, 1935 (public notices); November 28, 1935; February 27, 1936 (public notice); August 12, 1937 (classified); November 24, 1938; November 14, 1940; May 1, 1941; January 14, 1943; March 23, 1944; April 27, 1944; September 14, 1944; November 30, 1944; April 26, 1945; May 3, 1945; June 14, 1945; August 9, 1945; October 18, 1945; Lockwood Luminary, June 12, 1925 (advertisement); June 19, 1925 (advertisement); July 3, 1925 (advertisement); July 10, 1925 (advertisement); July 17, 1925 (advertisement); July 24, 1925 (advertisement); July 31, 1925 (advertisement); April 1, 1932; August 19, 1932; September 16, 1938; January 27, 1944; April 20, 1944; July 20, 1944; September 14, 1944; November 23, 1944; December 28, 1944; March 22, 1945; April 26, 1945; May 3, 1945; May 17, 1945; June 7, 1945; August 9, 1945; October 11, 1945; The Jasper County News, January 23, 1930.
