= Limestone Creek (Turnback Creek tributary) =

Stream in Dade and Lawrence counties of Missouri

Limestone Creek is a stream in Dade and Lawrence counties in the Ozarks of southwest Missouri. It is a tributary of Turnback Creek.

The stream headwaters are at 37°14′50″N 93°51′46″W in northern Lawrence County and the confluence with Turnback Creek is in Dade County at 37°23′23″N 93°48′30″W. The stream source area is northwest of Miller and west of Missouri Route 39. The stream flows north to northeast crossing under Missouri Route Z west of Pennsboro and Route 39 south of South Greenfield. The stream turns to the east on the east side of South Greenfield to meet Turnback Creek along the BNSF Railroad line about two miles northeast of South Greenfield.

Limestone Creek was named for the limestone bedrock along its course.
