= Missouri Route 39 =

State highway in Missouri, U.S.

Route 39

Route information
- Maintained by MoDOT
- Length: 111.287 mi (179.099 km)
- Existed: 1922–present

Major junctions
- South end: AR 221 at the Arkansas state line in Carr Lane
- US 60 in Aurora; I-44 in Mt. Vernon; US 160 in Greenfield
- North end: US 54 / Route DD in Cedar Springs

Location
- Country: United States
- State: Missouri

Highway system
- Missouri State Highway System; Interstate; US; State; Supplemental
← Route 38	→ US 40

Route 39 is a two-lane highway in southwestern Missouri. Its northern terminus is at U.S. Route 54 between Collins and El Dorado Springs at the community of Cedar Springs; its southern terminus is at the Arkansas state line (north of Berryville, Arkansas) where it continues as Highway 221.

Route 39 is one of the original 1922 state highways. At that time, its southern terminus was at the Dade/Lawrence County line south of Pennsboro.

There is a short Business Route 39 in Mount Vernon.

== Route description ==
Route 39 begins at US 54 in Cedar County, heading south-southeast towards Stockton. About one mile (1.6 km) before reaching Stockton, the road begins a brief concurrency with Route 32 before turning south again. Two miles south of Stockton is the western terminus of Route 215. Route 39 enters Dade County north of Arcola and south of that village, Route 39 crosses a branch of Stockton Lake.

At Greenfield is the beginning of a concurrency with U.S. Route 160 which last for two miles (3 km), with US 160 turning west and Route 39 continuing south to South Greenfield. The route enters Lawrence County south of Pennsboro. At Albatross is an intersection with Route 96.

At the north edge of Mount Vernon is the western terminus of Route 174, and two miles (3 km) further south, Route 39 turns east, joining Business Loop I-44 for about two miles (3 km). At Interstate 44, the business loop ends, and Route 265 begins and the two will be united to Aurora, where Route 39 intersects U.S. Route 60.

South of Aurora, Route 39 enters Barry County and heads straight south for about sixteen miles before intersecting with Route 248. The highway then enters the Mark Twain National Forest. Eight miles south of Route 248, Route 39 forms a brief concurrency with Route 76, then turns south again. At Shell Knob, Route 39 crosses Table Rock Lake. At Viola Route 39 enters Stone County and further south at Carr Lane is an intersection with Route 86, and one mile (1.6 km) further south the highway crosses the Arkansas state line.

== Major intersections ==
County	Location	mi	km	Destinations	Notes
Stone	Williams Township	0.000	0.000	AR 221 – Berryville	Continuation into Arkansas
Stone	Carr Lane	0.733	1.180	Route 86 to Route 13 – Eagle Rock	
Barry	Shell Knob Township	14.437	23.234	Route 76 east – Cape Fair	Eastern end of Route 76 overlap
Barry	Mineral Township	15.607	25.117	Route 76 west – Cassville	Western end of Route 76 overlap
Barry	Jenkins Township	23.345	37.570	Route 248 – Cassville, Galena	
Lawrence	Aurora	37.018	59.575	US 60 / Route 265 south – Marionville, Monett	Southern end of Route 265 overlap
Lawrence	Aurora	38.587	62.100	US 60 Bus. (Church Street)	
Lawrence	Mount Vernon	49.442	79.569	I-44 – Springfield, Joplin I-44 BL begins / Route 265 ends	Northern end of Route 265 overlap; eastern end of Loop 44 overlap
Lawrence	Mount Vernon	50.306	80.960	Route 39 Bus. north (Market Street)	
Lawrence	Mount Vernon	50.689	81.576	I-44 BL west (Loop 44 Boulevard)	Western end of Loop 44 overlap
Lawrence	Mount Vernon	52.379	84.296	Route 174 east to I-44 / Route 39 Bus. south	
Lawrence	Albatross	57.551	92.619	Route 96 to I-44 – Carthage	
Dade	Washington–Center township line	71.935	115.768	US 160 west – Lockwood	Southern end of US 160 overlap
Dade	Greenfield	74.054	119.178	US 160 east – Everton	Northern end of US 160 overlap
Cedar	Linn Township	91.937	147.958	Route 215 south to Route 245	Access to Stockton State Park
Cedar	Stockton	95.476	153.654	Route 32 east (East Street) – Fair Play	Eastern end of Route 32 overlap
Cedar	Stockton	96.678	155.588	Route 32 west – El Dorado Springs	Western end of Route 32 overlap
Cedar	Cedar Springs	111.287	179.099	US 54 – El Dorado Springs, Collins; Route DD to Route 82	Roadway continues as Route DD
1.000 mi = 1.609 km; 1.000 km = 0.621 mi: Concurrency terminus
