= Seybert, Missouri =

Extinct hamlet in Missouri, U.S.

Coordinates: 37°31′07″N 93°46′26″W

Seybert is an extinct town in Dade County, in the U.S. state of Missouri. The GNIS classifies it as a populated place.

A post office called Seybert was established in 1887, and remained in operation until 1918. The community was named after Silas E. Seybert, the proprietor of a local mill.

An 1899 history of Dade County reported that Seybert was on the Sac River and had a general store, a grocery store, a blacksmith, a mill, and a Grand Army of the Republic post.
