= Kings Point =

Kings Point may refer to:

- United States Merchant Marine Academy at Kings Point, New York

== Places ==
In the United States

- Kings Point, Florida
- Kings Point, Missouri
- Kings Point, Montana
- Kings Point, New York

Elsewhere

- Kings Point, New South Wales, Australia
- King's Point, Newfoundland and Labrador, Canada

== Other ==
- Kings Point (film) a 2012 short documentary film

== See also ==
- King Edward Point
- Kings Point Handicap
- Kings Point Light
