= Lockwood Township, Dade County, Missouri =

Township in Dade County, Missouri, U.S.

Coordinates: 37.3948818°N 93.9475705°W

Lockwood Township is a township in Dade County, in the U.S. state of Missouri.

Lockwood Township takes its name from the community of Lockwood, Missouri.
