= Arkansas Highway 221 =

State highway in Arkansas, United States

Highway 221

Route information
- Maintained by AHTD
- Length: 18.25 mi (29.37 km)
- Existed: July 10, 1957–present

Major junctions
- South end: CR 1425 at the Madison County line
- US 62 in Berryville; AR 21 in Berryville
- North end: Route 39 at the Missouri state line in Carr Lane, MO

Location
- Country: United States
- State: Arkansas
- Counties: Carroll

Highway system
- Arkansas Highway System; Interstate; US; State; Business; Spurs; Suffixed; Scenic; Heritage
← AR 220	→ AR 222

Arkansas Highway 221 (AR 221) is a north–south state highway in Carroll County, Arkansas. The route runs from the Madison County line north to the Missouri state line. Created in 1957, the route has remained unchanged since 1967. The route is maintained by the Arkansas State Highway and Transportation Department (AHTD).

== Route description ==
Highway 221 begins at the Madison County line in the Ozark Mountains. County Road 1425 continues south from this terminus into the McIlroy Wildlife Management Area under the Arkansas Game and Fish Commission administration. The state highway travels northeast through the hills and woods southwest of Berryville before entering the Berryville city limits. In Berryville, it travels north as Huntsville Street before turning onto Carl Street and intersecting U.S. Route 62 (US 62) just south of the Berryville town square. Highway 221 follows US 62 south to an intersection with Highway 21, where Highway 21/Highway 221 turn north together as Springfield Street.

Unusual for an Arkansas state highway, the concurrency of Highway 21 and Highway 221 is well signed though no signage is provided for northbound travelers to remain on northbound Highway 221 once it reaches US 62. The two routes travel together to the north edge of Berryville, when Highway 221 splits north toward the Missouri state line. Highway 221 winds through rural areas toward the state line, where the roadway continues as Missouri Route 39 towards Springfield.

== History ==
The route was created by the Arkansas State Highway Commission between Highway 21 and the Missouri state line on July 10, 1957. It was extended south on November 23, 1966, between US 62 in Berryville and the Madison County line. However, the extension was not correct, and the Commission clarified the intended extension on January 25, 1967, with the incorrect mileage being returned to the county highway system.

== Major intersections ==
The entire route is in Carroll County.

Location	mi	km	Destinations	Notes
	0.00	0.00	CR 1425 south – McIlroy Wildlife Management Area	Continuation into Madison County
Berryville	10.49	16.88	US 62 west (Main Street) – Eureka Springs	Southern end of US 62 concurrency
Berryville	See US 62 and AR 21			
Berryville	0.00	0.00	AR 21 north – Blue Eye	Northern end of AR 21 concurrency
	7.76	12.49	Route 39 north	Continuation into Missouri
1.000 mi = 1.609 km; 1.000 km = 0.621 mi: Concurrency terminus
