= Pennsboro, Missouri =

Unincorporated community in Missouri, U.S.

Coordinates: 37°19′38″N 93°50′03″W

Pennsboro is an unincorporated community in southern Dade County, in the U.S. state of Missouri.

The community is located along Missouri Route 39 at the intersection of routes Z and K approximately three miles south of South Greenfield. Honey Creek flows past to the east and Limestone Creek to the west of the location.

== History ==
Pennsboro was founded in the 1880s, and named after William Penn, a Dade County pioneer. A post office was established at Pennsboro in 1895, and remained in operation until 1931.

Pennsboro was a station on the Greenfield & Northern Railroad from the time it was constructed in the early 1890s until the line was abandoned by the St. Louis-San Francisco Railroad in the mid-1930s. Just prior to the abandonment, the depot was loaded in one piece onto a flat car at Pennsboro and transported down the line to Mt. Vernon, where it was replaced that community's depot that had recently been destroyed by fire.

Pennsboro was also home to one of the early rural consolidated school districts in Missouri, when four one-room common school districts agreed to combine circa 1917 to form the "Dade County Consolidated School District No. 3 of Pennsboro," or Pennsboro C-3 for short. However, the one-room rural schools themselves were not consolidated until the mid-1930s; the state board of education excoriated the Pennsboro C-3 district in its 1932 annual report for maintaining what they termed the four inefficient one-room schools rather than consolidating students at a central point and allowing teachers to teach fewer grades. (Missouri Annual Report of Public Schools, 1932, pp. 391–404) The still standing brick structure was constructed when the one-room schools were finally consolidated, and remained in use as a school until the district consolidated with the Greenfield R-IV School District in the 1950s.

== Today ==
Pennsboro today is home to the Pennsboro Christian Church and a large cemetery, as well as several residences. The community's former two-room brick school building is still standing and in use as a community center.
