= Cedar Township, Dade County, Missouri =

Township in the US state of Missouri

Coordinates: 37.5258°N 94.0108°W

Cedar Township is a township in Dade County, in the U.S. state of Missouri.

Cedar Township derives its name from the community of Cedarville, Missouri.
