= Dilday Mill =

- Formerly listed on the U.S. National Register of Historic Places
- Location within Missouri Location within the United States
- Location: Southeast of South Greenfield on Turnback Creek, near South Greenfield, Missouri
- Coordinates: 37°19′31″N 93°46′49″W
- Area: 1 acre (0.40 ha)
- Built: 1867
- Built by: Dilday, John B.
- NRHP reference No.: 77000805

Significant dates
- Added to NRHP: August 26, 1977
- Removed from NRHP: December 19, 1994

Dilday Mill, also known as Finley Mill, was a historic grist mill building located at Greenfield, Dade County, Missouri. It was built in 1867, and was a water-powered, grist mill standing two stories above ground level and three stories above Turnback Creek. It measured approximately 22 feet by 34 feet. The building collapsed in 1982.

It was listed on the National Register of Historic Places in 1977 and delisted in 1994.
