= Honey Creek (Limestone Creek tributary) =

Stream in southwest Missouri, U.S.

Honey Creek is a stream in Dade County in the Ozarks of southwest Missouri. It is a tributary of Limestone Creek.

The stream headwaters are at 37°17′43″N 93°50′39″W and the confluence with Limestone Creek is at 37°21′59″N 93°50′29″W.

Honey Creek was named for the honeybees along its course.

== See also ==
- List of rivers of Missouri
