= Pennsboro =

Pennsboro can refer to:

- Pennsboro, Missouri
- East Pennsboro Township, Pennsylvania
- West Pennsboro Township, Pennsylvania
- Pennsboro, West Virginia
