= Hulston, Missouri =

Extinct town in Missouri, U.S.

Hulston
- Extinct town
- Interactive map of Hulston
- Coordinates: 37°27′16″N 93°43′58″W
- Country: United States
- State: Missouri
- County: Dade

Hulston is an extinct town in Dade County, in the U.S. state of Missouri. The GNIS classifies it as a populated place.

A post office called Hulston was established in 1895, and remained in operation until 1904. The community was named after Christ Hulston, the proprietor of a local mill.
