= 1896 United States presidential election in Missouri =

- November 3, 1896

Nominee	William Jennings Bryan	William McKinley
Party	Democratic	Republican
Alliance	Populist
Home state	Nebraska	Ohio
Running mate	Arthur Sewall (Democratic); Thomas E. Watson (Populist)	Garret Hobart
Electoral vote	17	0
Popular vote	363,667	304,940
Percentage	53.96%	45.25%
County results
Bryan
50–60%
60–70%
70–80%
80–90%
McKinley
40–50%
50–60%
60–70%
70–80%
80–90%
President before election
Grover Cleveland
Democratic
Elected President
William McKinley
Republican

The 1896 United States presidential election in Missouri took place on November 3, 1896. All contemporary 45 states were part of the 1896 United States presidential election. Voters in Missouri chose 17 electors to the Electoral College, which selected the president and vice president.

Missouri was won by the Democratic nominees, former U.S. Representative William Jennings Bryan of Nebraska and his running mate Arthur Sewall of Maine. Four electors cast their vice presidential ballots for Thomas E. Watson. Unlike in the more easterly border states, Bryan's "free silver" platform had very substantial appeal in the Unionist but highly populist Ozark "Bible Belt". This was seen in that Missouri had in Richard P. Bland that earliest advocate of that monetary policy in Congress, and that only one vote had been cast in 1893 in Missouri against free silver, and that in St. Louis. Although all but one of Missouri's pro-silver members had reversed course by the time of the presidential election, the state was still hit much more than the Old Northwest and upper Mississippi Valley by farmers' debts from falling prices and crop failures since 1887. Despite opposition by the St. Louis Globe-Democrat to Bryan's free silver policies, Bryan gained strongly via capture of James B. Weaver's support base from the 1892 and 1880 elections in the strongly Baptist southwest, which was enough to counter Catholic defections from Grover Cleveland in St. Louis and surrounds. Bryan won Missouri by a margin of 8.71%.

This is the only election since the Civil War where Douglas County voted for a Democratic presidential candidate. Bryan was also the first Democrat since James Buchanan in 1856 to carry Dade, Dallas, Jasper, Lawrence, Polk and Wright counties.

Bryan would win Missouri again against McKinley four years later but would later lose the state in 1908 to William Howard Taft.

== Results ==
1896 United States presidential election in Missouri
Party	Candidate	Votes	Percentage	Electoral votes
Democratic	William Jennings Bryan	363,667	53.96%	13
Populist	William Jennings Bryan	0	0.00%	4
Total	William Jennings Bryan	363,667	53.96%	17
Republican	William McKinley	304,940	45.25%	0
National Democratic	John M. Palmer	2,365	0.35%	0
Prohibition	Joshua Levering	2,043	0.30%	0
Socialist Labor	Charles H. Matchett	599	0.09%	0
National Prohibition	Charles Eugene Bentley	292	0.04%	0
Totals		673,906	100.00%	17
Voter turnout				—

=== Results by county ===
1896 United States presidential election in Missouri by county
County	William Jennings Bryan Democratic		William McKinley Republican		Various candidates Other parties		Margin		Total votes cast
County	#	%	#	%	#	%	#	%	Total votes cast
Adair	2,311	48.71%	2,402	50.63%	31	0.65%	-91	-1.92%	4,744
Andrew	2,191	48.90%	2,252	50.26%	38	0.85%	-61	-1.36%	4,481
Atchison	2,272	58.18%	1,587	40.64%	46	1.18%	685	17.54%	3,905
Audrain	3,984	70.79%	1,609	28.59%	35	0.62%	2,375	42.20%	5,628
Barry	3,151	57.37%	2,320	42.24%	21	0.38%	831	15.13%	5,492
Barton	2,824	64.02%	1,496	33.92%	91	2.06%	1,328	30.11%	4,411
Bates	5,073	65.64%	2,522	32.63%	133	1.72%	2,551	33.01%	7,728
Benton	1,762	46.59%	1,957	51.75%	63	1.67%	-195	-5.16%	3,782
Bollinger	1,485	53.77%	1,272	46.05%	5	0.18%	213	7.71%	2,762
Boone	5,075	74.39%	1,705	24.99%	42	0.62%	3,370	49.40%	6,822
Buchanan	7,336	51.17%	6,854	47.81%	147	1.03%	482	3.36%	14,337
Butler	1,743	51.37%	1,635	48.19%	15	0.44%	108	3.18%	3,393
Caldwell	2,053	48.71%	2,115	50.18%	47	1.12%	-62	-1.47%	4,215
Callaway	4,358	69.42%	1,849	29.45%	71	1.13%	2,509	39.96%	6,278
Camden	1,287	48.92%	1,326	50.40%	18	0.68%	-39	-1.48%	2,631
Cape Girardeau	2,473	49.42%	2,482	49.60%	49	0.98%	-9	-0.18%	5,004
Carroll	3,555	50.91%	3,363	48.16%	65	0.93%	192	2.75%	6,983
Carter	611	55.19%	483	43.63%	13	1.17%	128	11.56%	1,107
Cass	3,975	63.31%	2,229	35.50%	75	1.19%	1,746	27.81%	6,279
Cedar	2,400	55.87%	1,881	43.78%	15	0.35%	519	12.08%	4,296
Chariton	4,321	64.49%	2,359	35.21%	20	0.30%	1,962	29.28%	6,700
Christian	1,729	46.49%	1,983	53.32%	7	0.19%	-254	-6.83%	3,719
Clark	2,107	51.67%	1,953	47.89%	18	0.44%	154	3.78%	4,078
Clay	4,071	80.42%	924	18.25%	67	1.32%	3,147	62.17%	5,062
Clinton	2,610	58.74%	1,792	40.33%	41	0.92%	818	18.41%	4,443
Cole	2,198	51.39%	2,033	47.53%	46	1.08%	165	3.86%	4,277
Cooper	3,028	52.56%	2,711	47.06%	22	0.38%	317	5.50%	5,761
Crawford	1,383	48.66%	1,447	50.91%	12	0.42%	-64	-2.25%	2,842
Dade	2,363	56.54%	1,797	43.00%	19	0.45%	566	13.54%	4,179
Dallas	1,525	50.71%	1,466	48.75%	16	0.53%	59	1.96%	3,007
Daviess	3,125	56.77%	2,330	42.33%	50	0.91%	795	14.44%	5,505
DeKalb	2,167	57.24%	1,590	42.00%	29	0.77%	577	15.24%	3,786
Dent	1,493	57.69%	1,087	42.00%	8	0.31%	406	15.69%	2,588
Douglas	1,700	51.41%	1,598	48.32%	9	0.27%	102	3.08%	3,307
Dunklin	2,975	75.47%	961	24.38%	6	0.15%	2,014	51.09%	3,942
Franklin	2,904	43.18%	3,797	56.46%	24	0.36%	-893	-13.28%	6,725
Gasconade	515	18.88%	2,185	80.10%	28	1.03%	-1,670	-61.22%	2,728
Gentry	2,906	58.67%	2,000	40.38%	47	0.95%	906	18.29%	4,953
Greene	6,327	51.83%	5,808	47.58%	72	0.59%	519	4.25%	12,207
Grundy	1,675	37.41%	2,778	62.05%	24	0.54%	-1,103	-24.64%	4,477
Harrison	2,582	46.30%	2,956	53.00%	39	0.70%	-374	-6.71%	5,577
Henry	4,442	57.41%	3,234	41.79%	62	0.80%	1,208	15.61%	7,738
Hickory	1,045	46.51%	1,194	53.14%	8	0.36%	-149	-6.63%	2,247
Holt	2,036	45.40%	2,397	53.44%	52	1.16%	-361	-8.05%	4,485
Howard	3,317	70.60%	1,353	28.80%	28	0.60%	1,964	41.81%	4,698
Howell	2,373	55.21%	1,892	44.02%	33	0.77%	481	11.19%	4,298
Iron	1,016	62.33%	607	37.24%	7	0.43%	409	25.09%	1,630
Jackson	20,705	51.94%	18,711	46.94%	446	1.12%	1,994	5.00%	39,862
Jasper	7,026	58.69%	4,835	40.39%	111	0.93%	2,191	18.30%	11,972
Jefferson	2,785	48.87%	2,876	50.46%	38	0.67%	-91	-1.60%	5,699
Johnson	4,240	56.48%	3,219	42.88%	48	0.64%	1,021	13.60%	7,507
Knox	2,185	63.04%	1,246	35.95%	35	1.01%	939	27.09%	3,466
Laclede	2,120	56.52%	1,598	42.60%	33	0.88%	522	13.92%	3,751
Lafayette	4,463	56.49%	3,375	42.72%	63	0.80%	1,088	13.77%	7,901
Lawrence	3,369	52.85%	2,962	46.46%	44	0.69%	407	6.38%	6,375
Lewis	2,624	61.87%	1,581	37.28%	36	0.85%	1,043	24.59%	4,241
Lincoln	3,003	65.51%	1,564	34.12%	17	0.37%	1,439	31.39%	4,584
Linn	3,327	52.07%	3,015	47.18%	48	0.75%	312	4.88%	6,390
Livingston	3,351	57.81%	2,377	41.00%	69	1.19%	974	16.80%	5,797
Macon	4,473	55.88%	3,475	43.41%	57	0.71%	998	12.47%	8,005
Madison	1,256	61.33%	780	38.09%	12	0.59%	476	23.24%	2,048
Maries	1,385	71.54%	546	28.20%	5	0.26%	839	43.34%	1,936
Marion	4,008	59.30%	2,699	39.93%	52	0.77%	1,309	19.37%	6,759
McDonald	1,676	62.37%	998	37.14%	13	0.48%	678	25.23%	2,687
Mercer	1,405	41.42%	1,958	57.72%	29	0.85%	-553	-16.30%	3,392
Miller	1,694	49.62%	1,707	50.00%	13	0.38%	-13	-0.38%	3,414
Mississippi	1,673	60.77%	1,074	39.01%	6	0.22%	599	21.76%	2,753
Moniteau	2,096	56.54%	1,580	42.62%	31	0.84%	516	13.92%	3,707
Monroe	4,379	82.72%	892	16.85%	23	0.43%	3,487	65.87%	5,294
Montgomery	2,272	53.41%	1,920	45.13%	62	1.46%	352	8.27%	4,254
Morgan	1,628	54.18%	1,366	45.46%	11	0.37%	262	8.72%	3,005
New Madrid	1,639	77.27%	480	22.63%	2	0.09%	1,159	54.64%	2,121
Newton	3,029	57.50%	2,174	41.27%	65	1.23%	855	16.23%	5,268
Nodaway	4,577	56.68%	3,437	42.56%	61	0.76%	1,140	14.12%	8,075
Oregon	1,783	75.39%	576	24.36%	6	0.25%	1,207	51.04%	2,365
Osage	1,456	45.61%	1,700	53.26%	36	1.13%	-244	-7.64%	3,192
Ozark	1,025	46.17%	1,187	53.47%	8	0.36%	-162	-7.30%	2,220
Pemiscot	1,260	77.87%	355	21.94%	3	0.19%	905	55.93%	1,618
Perry	1,450	48.17%	1,522	50.56%	38	1.26%	-72	-2.39%	3,010
Pettis	4,267	50.40%	4,119	48.65%	81	0.96%	148	1.75%	8,467
Phelps	1,816	63.32%	1,038	36.19%	14	0.49%	778	27.13%	2,868
Pike	3,839	56.78%	2,884	42.66%	38	0.56%	955	14.13%	6,761
Platte	3,191	74.80%	1,044	24.47%	31	0.73%	2,147	50.33%	4,266
Polk	2,711	51.09%	2,564	48.32%	31	0.58%	147	2.77%	5,306
Pulaski	1,410	63.63%	802	36.19%	4	0.18%	608	27.44%	2,216
Putnam	1,376	36.64%	2,363	62.93%	16	0.43%	-987	-26.28%	3,755
Ralls	2,297	73.60%	814	26.08%	10	0.32%	1,483	47.52%	3,121
Randolph	4,097	65.01%	2,162	34.31%	43	0.68%	1,935	30.70%	6,302
Ray	3,945	65.60%	2,003	33.31%	66	1.10%	1,942	32.29%	6,014
Reynolds	1,015	72.34%	385	27.44%	3	0.21%	630	44.90%	1,403
Ripley	1,442	65.69%	749	34.12%	4	0.18%	693	31.57%	2,195
Saint Charles	2,448	43.32%	3,173	56.15%	30	0.53%	-725	-12.83%	5,651
Saint Clair	2,686	59.19%	1,829	40.30%	23	0.51%	857	18.88%	4,538
Saint Francois	2,245	57.17%	1,664	42.37%	18	0.46%	581	14.80%	3,927
Saint Louis County	3,403	35.12%	6,210	64.09%	76	0.78%	-2,807	-28.97%	9,689
Saint Louis City	50,091	42.81%	65,708	56.16%	1,197	1.02%	-15,617	-13.35%	116,996
Sainte Genevieve	1,245	57.83%	903	41.94%	5	0.23%	342	15.88%	2,153
Saline	5,615	64.16%	3,050	34.85%	87	0.99%	2,565	29.31%	8,752
Schuyler	1,592	57.87%	1,131	41.11%	28	1.02%	461	16.76%	2,751
Scotland	2,077	62.96%	1,203	36.47%	19	0.58%	874	26.49%	3,299
Scott	1,906	71.60%	751	28.21%	5	0.19%	1,155	43.39%	2,662
Shannon	1,186	63.09%	689	36.65%	5	0.27%	497	26.44%	1,880
Shelby	2,850	68.56%	1,275	30.67%	32	0.77%	1,575	37.89%	4,157
Stoddard	2,968	64.90%	1,584	34.64%	21	0.46%	1,384	30.26%	4,573
Stone	827	42.89%	1,094	56.74%	7	0.36%	-267	-13.85%	1,928
Sullivan	2,451	50.26%	2,393	49.07%	33	0.68%	58	1.19%	4,877
Taney	925	47.29%	1,024	52.35%	7	0.36%	-99	-5.06%	1,956
Texas	2,672	59.67%	1,785	39.86%	21	0.47%	887	19.81%	4,478
Vernon	5,133	69.12%	2,230	30.03%	63	0.85%	2,903	39.09%	7,426
Warren	691	29.06%	1,680	70.65%	7	0.29%	-989	-41.59%	2,378
Washington	1,458	48.45%	1,547	51.41%	4	0.13%	-89	-2.96%	3,009
Wayne	1,568	52.13%	1,418	47.14%	22	0.73%	150	4.99%	3,008
Webster	1,985	54.12%	1,666	45.42%	17	0.46%	319	8.70%	3,668
Worth	1,248	58.21%	885	41.28%	11	0.51%	363	16.93%	2,144
Wright	1,777	50.20%	1,755	49.58%	8	0.23%	22	0.62%	3,540
Totals	363,667	53.96%	304,930	45.24%	5,422	0.80%	58,737	8.71%	674,019

== See also ==
- United States presidential elections in Missouri
