= Sac Township, Dade County, Missouri =

Township in Dade County, Missouri, U.S.

Coordinates: 37.51°N 93.76°W

Sac Township is a rural township in Dade County, in the U.S. state of Missouri. It is laid out as a rectangle around the southern half of Stockton Lake, and there are no organized communities within its boundaries.

Sac Township was named after the Sac River.
