= Smith Township, Dade County, Missouri =

Township in Missouri, U.S.

Coordinates: 37°19′01″N 93°52′30″W

Smith Township is a township in Dade County, in the U.S. state of Missouri.

Smith Township was named after Asa Smith, an early settler.
