= Turnback Creek =

Stream in the U.S. state of Missouri

Turnback Creek is a stream in the Ozarks of southwest Missouri. The stream headwaters are in western Christian County just southwest of Billings. The stream flows north-northwest after passing under U.S. Route 60 and on through the extreme southwest corner of Greene County and into Lawrence County. In Lawrence County the stream flows northwest passing under Interstate 44 southwest of Halltown and into southeast Dade County. In Dade County the stream flows generally north and enters the Sac River arm of Stockton Lake at U.S. Route 160 east of Greenfield.

The stream source is at 37°02′26″N 93°36′23″W, and its confluence is at 37°26′46″N 93°45′26″W.

Turnback Creek was named from an incident in the 1830s when a group of pioneers "turned back" and headed back east due to harsh winter weather.

Dilday Mill was formerly located on Turnback Creek.

== See also ==
- List of rivers of Missouri
