= Dudenville, Missouri =

Unincorporated community in Missouri, U.S.

Coordinates: 37°18′20″N 94°5′0″W

Dudenville (also Chambersville, or Chambersburg) is an unincorporated community in Dade and Jasper counties in the U.S. state of Missouri. Its elevation is 1,086 feet (331 m).

Local lore states that the name of the town would change from Chambersville to Dudenville depending on whether the Republican or Democratic store owner in the community had the post office. When the post office was discontinued in 1900, Dudenville was the name in use.

At one time, the community had three general stores (one with a drug store), a barber shop, ice house, cafe, and movie theater, as well as an IOOF lodge and affiliate of the Anti-Horse Thief Association. There were also congregations of the Brethren and Methodist churches.

The community's one-room school, Unity, was located one mile west of the stores until it closed in 1963, the rural district having consolidated with what is now the Golden City R-3 district in 1960.

The last store closed in 1969, and the cinder-block structure is now being used as a residence.

While the Brethren Church is long gone, the Methodist congregation met weekly until 2003; the building is still standing.

There is a large cemetery in the north part of the community, which has been in use at least as long as the community has existed. A metal gate was erected over the main cemetery entrance in 1925, this date is marked prominently on the gate.
