= Rock Prairie Township, Dade County, Missouri =

Township in Dade County, Missouri, U.S.

Coordinates: 37.33°N 93.65°W

Rock Prairie Township is a township in Dade County, in the U.S. state of Missouri.

Rock Prairie Township was named after a nearby prairie of the same name.
