= North Township, Dade County, Missouri =

Township in the American state of Missouri

Coordinates: 37.51°N 93.87°W

North Township is a township in Dade County, in the U.S. state of Missouri.

North Township lies in the northern part of Dade County, hence the name.
