= Corry, Missouri =

Unincorporated community in Missouri, U.S.

Coordinates: 37°29′15″N 93°43′31″W

Corry is an unincorporated community in Dade County, in the U.S. state of Missouri.

== History ==
Corry was laid out in 1875 as "Cora", and named after Cora Alexander, the daughter of an early settler (a recording error accounts for the error in spelling, which was never corrected). A post office called Corry was established in 1876, and remained in operation until 1907.
