= North Morgan Township, Dade County, Missouri =

Township in Missouri, U.S.

Coordinates: 37°32′41″N 93°40′19″W

North Morgan Township is a township in Dade County, in the U.S. state of Missouri. It is also a voting precinct.

Morgan Township was named for Adonijah Morgan by Dr. William Mathews, who sold his farm to Mr. Morgan upon the arrival of the latter in 1836.
