= 1900 United States presidential election in Missouri =

- November 6, 1900

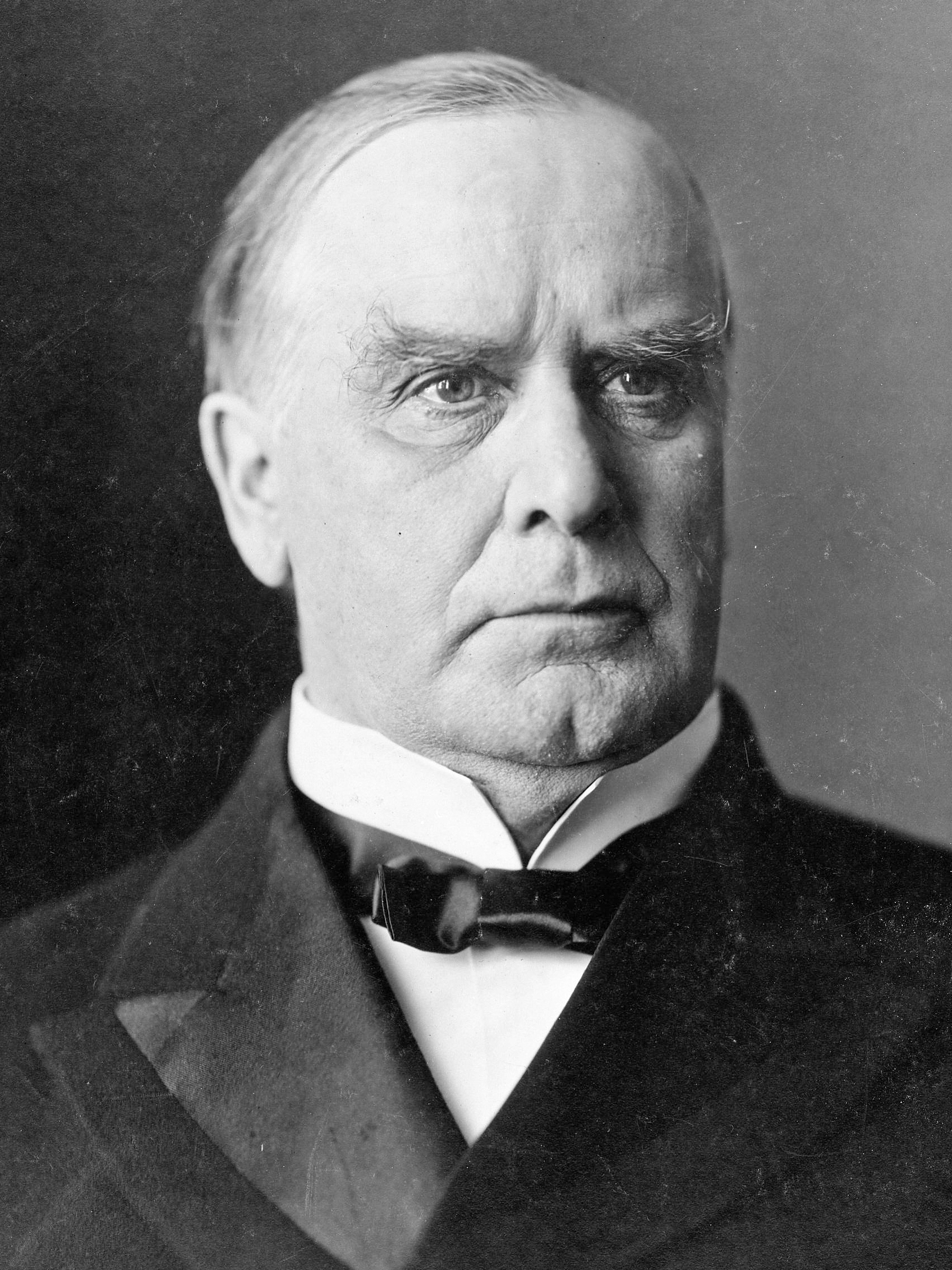
Nominee	William Jennings Bryan	William McKinley
Party	Democratic	Republican
Home state	Nebraska	Ohio
Running mate	Adlai Stevenson I	Theodore Roosevelt
Electoral vote	17	0
Popular vote	351,922	314,092
Percentage	51.48%	45.94%
County results
Bryan
40–50%
50–60%
60–70%
70–80%
80–90%
McKinley
40–50%
50–60%
60–70%
70–80%
President before election
William McKinley
Republican
Elected President
William McKinley
Republican

The 1900 United States presidential election in Missouri took place on November 6, 1900. Voters chose 17 electors to represent them in the Electoral College via a popular vote, pitting incumbent Republican President William McKinley and his running mate Theodore Roosevelt against the Democratic ticket of challenger William Jennings Bryan and Adlai Stevenson. Missouri gave Bryan 51.48 percent of the vote versus McKinley's 45.94 percent, a margin of 5.53%. While losing Missouri, McKinley nevertheless won the national election by a 6.13-point margin.

After 1900 and before 2008, the state voted for the national winner in every election except for 1956 (coincidentally, Missouri voted for Stevenson's grandson in that election). However, that reputation began to fade after voting for losing Republican candidates for two elections in a row in 2008 and 2012. McKinley was the only president in American history to win two terms in office and lose Missouri twice until 2012 and is the only Republican president to ever do so.

Bryan had previously defeated McKinley in Missouri four years earlier but would later lose the state to William Howard Taft in 1908.

== Results ==
Presidential Candidate	Running Mate	Party	Electoral Vote (EV)	Popular Vote (PV)	
William Jennings Bryan	Adlai Stevenson I	Democrat	17	351,922	51.48%
William McKinley (incumbent)	Theodore Roosevelt	Republican	0	314,092	45.94%
Eugene V. Debs	Job Harriman	Social Democratic Party	0	6,139	0.90%
John G. Woolley	Henry B. Metcalf	Prohibition Party	0	5,965	0.87%
Wharton Barker	Ignatius L. Donnelly	Progressive People's Party	0	4,244	0.62%
Joseph F. Malloney	Valentine Remmel	Socialist Labor Party	0	1,294	0.19%

=== Results by county ===
1900 United States presidential election in Missouri by county
County	William Jennings Bryan Democratic		William McKinley Republican		Eugene V. Debs Social Democratic		John G. Woolley Prohibition		Various candidates Other parties		Margin		Total votes cast
County	#	%	#	%	#	%	#	%	#	%	#	%	Total votes cast
Adair	2,180	43.15%	2,673	52.91%	21	0.42%	62	1.23%	116	2.30%	-493	-9.76%	5,052
Andrew	2,022	45.53%	2,356	53.05%	17	0.38%	34	0.77%	12	0.27%	-334	-7.52%	4,441
Atchison	1,926	50.13%	1,767	45.99%	14	0.36%	122	3.18%	13	0.34%	159	4.14%	3,842
Audrain	3,477	69.21%	1,436	28.58%	14	0.28%	61	1.21%	36	0.72%	2,041	40.63%	5,024
Barry	2,661	51.12%	2,420	46.49%	27	0.52%	44	0.85%	53	1.02%	241	4.63%	5,205
Barton	2,349	54.30%	1,780	41.15%	83	1.92%	96	2.22%	18	0.42%	569	13.15%	4,326
Bates	3,591	51.62%	2,731	39.26%	106	1.52%	150	2.16%	378	5.43%	860	12.36%	6,956
Benton	1,532	42.09%	1,980	54.40%	29	0.80%	27	0.74%	72	1.98%	-448	-12.31%	3,640
Bollinger	1,533	49.58%	1,515	49.00%	13	0.42%	21	0.68%	10	0.32%	18	0.58%	3,092
Boone	4,793	72.74%	1,672	25.38%	21	0.32%	53	0.80%	50	0.76%	3,121	47.37%	6,589
Buchanan	8,925	50.91%	8,329	47.51%	57	0.33%	198	1.13%	23	0.13%	596	3.40%	17,532
Butler	1,670	45.79%	1,888	51.77%	70	1.92%	10	0.27%	9	0.25%	-218	-5.98%	3,647
Caldwell	2,722	53.60%	2,235	44.01%	13	0.32%	65	1.59%	43	1.05%	487	9.59%	5,078
Callaway	4,133	68.28%	1,864	30.79%	8	0.13%	31	0.51%	17	0.28%	2,269	37.49%	6,053
Camden	1,078	41.48%	1,511	58.14%	8	0.31%	1	0.04%	1	0.04%	-433	-16.66%	2,599
Cape Girardeau	2,318	43.88%	2,778	52.58%	27	0.51%	87	1.65%	73	1.38%	-460	-8.71%	5,283
Carroll	3,300	49.96%	3,192	48.33%	23	0.35%	75	1.14%	15	0.23%	108	1.64%	6,605
Carter	755	54.32%	629	45.25%	3	0.22%	3	0.22%	0	0.00%	126	9.06%	1,390
Cass	3,350	58.65%	2,162	37.85%	75	1.31%	89	1.56%	36	0.63%	1,188	20.80%	5,712
Cedar	1,820	47.87%	1,845	48.53%	21	0.55%	23	0.60%	93	2.45%	-25	-0.66%	3,802
Chariton	3,828	63.16%	2,138	35.27%	26	0.43%	37	0.61%	32	0.53%	1,690	27.88%	6,061
Christian	1,326	37.55%	2,107	59.67%	16	0.45%	24	0.68%	58	1.64%	-781	-22.12%	3,531
Clark	2,021	50.77%	1,899	47.70%	7	0.18%	49	1.23%	5	0.13%	122	3.06%	3,981
Clay	3,585	78.00%	921	20.04%	10	0.22%	55	1.20%	25	0.54%	2,664	57.96%	4,596
Clinton	2,405	56.65%	1,745	41.11%	11	0.26%	61	1.44%	23	0.54%	660	15.55%	4,245
Cole	2,320	51.45%	2,157	47.84%	15	0.33%	9	0.20%	8	0.18%	163	3.61%	4,509
Cooper	2,756	49.28%	2,738	48.96%	17	0.30%	33	0.59%	48	0.86%	18	0.32%	5,592
Crawford	1,318	46.57%	1,470	51.94%	22	0.78%	17	0.60%	3	0.11%	-152	-5.37%	2,830
Dade	1,821	46.23%	1,992	50.57%	44	1.12%	25	0.63%	57	1.45%	-171	-4.34%	3,939
Dallas	1,238	44.03%	1,506	53.56%	7	0.25%	20	0.71%	41	1.46%	-268	-9.53%	2,812
Daviess	2,670	50.95%	2,373	45.29%	21	0.40%	113	2.16%	63	1.20%	297	5.67%	5,240
DeKalb	1,840	50.94%	1,669	46.21%	8	0.22%	60	1.66%	35	0.97%	171	4.73%	3,612
Dent	1,419	55.87%	1,085	42.72%	8	0.31%	12	0.47%	16	0.63%	334	13.15%	2,540
Douglas	858	29.05%	1,705	57.72%	14	0.47%	10	0.34%	367	12.42%	-847	-28.67%	2,954
Dunklin	2,711	66.77%	1,276	31.43%	33	0.81%	24	0.59%	16	0.39%	1,435	35.34%	4,060
Franklin	2,652	41.37%	3,686	57.49%	18	0.28%	38	0.59%	17	0.27%	-1,034	-16.13%	6,411
Gasconade	575	21.95%	2,015	76.91%	15	0.57%	13	0.50%	2	0.08%	-1,440	-54.96%	2,620
Gentry	2,459	51.13%	2,185	45.44%	17	0.35%	83	1.73%	65	1.35%	274	5.70%	4,809
Greene	5,519	46.52%	6,009	50.65%	93	0.78%	73	0.62%	170	1.43%	-490	-4.13%	11,864
Grundy	1,532	36.64%	2,576	61.61%	14	0.33%	39	0.93%	20	0.48%	-1,044	-24.97%	4,181
Harrison	2,209	40.31%	3,083	56.26%	19	0.35%	108	1.97%	61	1.11%	-874	-15.95%	5,480
Henry	3,777	56.81%	2,626	39.49%	39	0.59%	155	2.33%	52	0.78%	1,151	17.31%	6,649
Hickory	777	36.74%	1,270	60.05%	10	0.47%	13	0.61%	45	2.13%	-493	-23.31%	2,115
Holt	1,765	42.29%	2,292	54.91%	18	0.43%	80	1.92%	19	0.46%	-527	-12.63%	4,174
Howard	3,134	69.57%	1,295	28.75%	10	0.22%	37	0.82%	29	0.64%	1,839	40.82%	4,505
Howell	1,975	46.85%	2,059	48.84%	38	0.90%	39	0.93%	105	2.49%	-84	-1.99%	4,216
Iron	932	58.36%	642	40.20%	5	0.31%	11	0.69%	7	0.44%	290	18.16%	1,597
Jackson	22,542	49.87%	21,581	47.74%	494	1.09%	398	0.88%	191	0.42%	961	2.13%	45,206
Jasper	9,658	50.69%	8,747	45.91%	327	1.72%	220	1.15%	100	0.52%	911	4.78%	19,052
Jefferson	2,798	49.61%	2,775	49.20%	14	0.25%	28	0.50%	25	0.44%	23	0.41%	5,640
Johnson	3,612	52.99%	3,051	44.76%	37	0.54%	74	1.09%	42	0.62%	561	8.23%	6,816
Knox	1,908	57.30%	1,344	40.36%	12	0.36%	46	1.38%	20	0.60%	564	16.94%	3,330
Laclede	1,786	50.54%	1,686	47.71%	7	0.20%	17	0.48%	38	1.08%	100	2.83%	3,534
Lafayette	4,217	55.28%	3,311	43.40%	22	0.29%	50	0.66%	29	0.38%	906	11.88%	7,629
Lawrence	3,313	47.05%	3,552	50.44%	61	0.87%	87	1.24%	29	0.41%	-239	-3.39%	7,042
Lewis	2,583	62.82%	1,442	35.07%	26	0.63%	44	1.07%	17	0.41%	1,141	27.75%	4,112
Lincoln	2,761	62.65%	1,563	35.47%	18	0.41%	55	1.25%	10	0.23%	1,198	27.18%	4,407
Linn	3,137	49.47%	3,104	48.95%	10	0.16%	40	0.63%	50	0.79%	33	0.52%	6,341
Livingston	2,659	48.33%	2,493	45.31%	29	0.53%	125	2.27%	196	3.56%	166	3.02%	5,502
Macon	4,174	52.25%	3,568	44.67%	133	1.66%	68	0.85%	45	0.56%	606	7.59%	7,988
Madison	1,153	55.94%	881	42.75%	6	0.29%	15	0.73%	6	0.29%	272	13.20%	2,061
Maries	1,273	69.83%	544	29.84%	3	0.16%	3	0.16%	0	0.00%	729	39.99%	1,823
Marion	3,927	60.17%	2,490	38.16%	21	0.32%	72	1.10%	16	0.25%	1,437	22.02%	6,526
McDonald	1,469	54.73%	1,138	42.40%	22	0.82%	33	1.23%	22	0.82%	331	12.33%	2,684
Mercer	1,106	35.20%	1,973	62.79%	11	0.35%	41	1.30%	11	0.35%	-867	-27.59%	3,142
Miller	1,493	44.58%	1,796	53.63%	4	0.12%	22	0.66%	34	1.02%	-303	-9.05%	3,349
Mississippi	1,384	57.03%	1,020	42.03%	7	0.29%	12	0.49%	4	0.16%	364	15.00%	2,427
Moniteau	1,876	50.19%	1,684	45.05%	23	0.62%	32	0.86%	123	3.29%	192	5.14%	3,738
Monroe	4,016	82.35%	795	16.30%	17	0.35%	23	0.47%	26	0.53%	3,221	66.04%	4,877
Montgomery	2,000	50.03%	1,866	46.67%	15	0.38%	83	2.08%	34	0.85%	134	3.35%	3,998
Morgan	1,390	48.31%	1,434	49.84%	6	0.21%	15	0.52%	32	1.11%	-44	-1.53%	2,877
New Madrid	1,379	67.20%	668	32.55%	3	0.15%	1	0.05%	1	0.05%	711	34.65%	2,052
Newton	2,877	49.87%	2,673	46.33%	33	0.57%	148	2.57%	38	0.66%	204	3.54%	5,769
Nodaway	4,055	50.05%	3,858	47.62%	53	0.65%	112	1.38%	24	0.30%	197	2.43%	8,102
Oregon	1,768	71.64%	652	26.42%	27	1.09%	5	0.20%	16	0.65%	1,116	45.22%	2,468
Osage	1,396	43.78%	1,731	54.28%	10	0.31%	50	1.57%	2	0.06%	-335	-10.50%	3,189
Ozark	695	34.58%	1,272	63.28%	5	0.25%	16	0.80%	22	1.09%	-577	-28.71%	2,010
Pemiscot	1,370	67.42%	655	32.23%	4	0.20%	1	0.05%	2	0.10%	715	35.19%	2,032
Perry	1,660	49.23%	1,681	49.85%	14	0.42%	16	0.47%	1	0.03%	-21	-0.62%	3,372
Pettis	3,820	48.82%	3,824	48.88%	103	1.32%	65	0.83%	12	0.15%	-4	-0.05%	7,824
Phelps	1,603	56.50%	1,153	40.64%	13	0.46%	18	0.63%	50	1.76%	450	15.86%	2,837
Pike	3,747	59.16%	2,534	40.01%	12	0.19%	35	0.55%	6	0.09%	1,213	19.15%	6,334
Platte	3,052	74.86%	997	24.45%	4	0.10%	20	0.49%	4	0.10%	2,055	50.40%	4,077
Polk	2,178	43.57%	2,679	53.59%	17	0.34%	43	0.86%	82	1.64%	-501	-10.02%	4,999
Pulaski	1,282	63.43%	728	36.02%	2	0.10%	7	0.34%	2	0.10%	554	27.41%	2,021
Putnam	1,159	32.46%	2,337	65.46%	16	0.45%	33	0.92%	25	0.70%	-1,178	-33.00%	3,570
Ralls	2,161	73.03%	770	26.02%	4	0.14%	18	0.61%	6	0.20%	1,391	47.01%	2,959
Randolph	4,006	66.07%	1,932	31.87%	36	0.59%	51	0.84%	38	0.63%	2,074	34.21%	6,063
Ray	3,631	63.46%	2,004	35.02%	21	0.37%	46	0.80%	20	0.35%	1,627	28.43%	5,722
Reynolds	1,027	69.35%	451	30.45%	3	0.20%	0	0.00%	0	0.00%	576	38.89%	1,481
Ripley	1,439	61.68%	822	35.23%	2	0.09%	31	1.33%	39	1.67%	617	26.45%	2,333
Saint Charles	2,343	40.95%	3,324	58.10%	34	0.59%	14	0.24%	6	0.10%	-981	-17.15%	5,721
Saint Clair	2,036	49.59%	1,844	44.91%	21	0.51%	75	1.83%	130	3.17%	192	4.68%	4,106
Saint Francois	2,707	53.43%	2,295	45.30%	17	0.34%	39	0.77%	8	0.16%	412	8.13%	5,066
Saint Louis County	3,864	36.55%	6,537	61.83%	101	0.96%	60	0.57%	12	0.11%	-2,673	-25.28%	10,573
Saint Louis City	59,931	48.11%	60,597	48.64%	2,749	2.21%	327	0.26%	974	0.78%	-666	-0.53%	124,574
Sainte Genevieve	1,296	57.70%	935	41.63%	0	0.00%	5	0.22%	10	0.45%	361	16.07%	2,246
Saline	4,901	62.54%	2,814	35.91%	29	0.37%	58	0.74%	34	0.43%	2,087	26.63%	7,836
Schuyler	1,335	53.34%	1,061	42.39%	2	0.08%	65	2.60%	40	1.60%	274	10.95%	2,503
Scotland	1,760	56.28%	1,277	40.84%	12	0.38%	50	1.60%	28	0.90%	483	15.45%	3,127
Scott	1,706	66.64%	821	32.07%	14	0.55%	14	0.55%	5	0.20%	885	34.57%	2,560
Shannon	1,279	62.91%	716	35.22%	15	0.74%	8	0.39%	15	0.74%	563	27.69%	2,033
Shelby	2,578	66.65%	1,217	31.46%	5	0.13%	57	1.47%	11	0.28%	1,361	35.19%	3,868
Stoddard	2,695	58.26%	1,840	39.78%	32	0.69%	30	0.65%	29	0.63%	855	18.48%	4,626
Stone	573	31.57%	1,182	65.12%	15	0.83%	7	0.39%	38	2.09%	-609	-33.55%	1,815
Sullivan	2,395	49.25%	2,386	49.06%	17	0.35%	58	1.19%	7	0.14%	9	0.19%	4,863
Taney	753	39.18%	1,137	59.16%	16	0.83%	10	0.52%	6	0.31%	-384	-19.98%	1,922
Texas	2,218	55.70%	1,713	43.02%	9	0.23%	14	0.35%	28	0.70%	505	12.68%	3,982
Vernon	4,306	62.58%	2,356	34.24%	61	0.89%	118	1.71%	40	0.58%	1,950	28.34%	6,881
Warren	579	25.87%	1,599	71.45%	27	1.21%	15	0.67%	18	0.80%	-1,020	-45.58%	2,238
Washington	1,500	45.91%	1,751	53.60%	3	0.09%	12	0.37%	1	0.03%	-251	-7.68%	3,267
Wayne	1,745	50.92%	1,648	48.09%	13	0.38%	19	0.55%	2	0.06%	97	2.83%	3,427
Webster	1,702	47.84%	1,721	48.37%	16	0.45%	40	1.12%	79	2.22%	-19	-0.53%	3,558
Worth	1,123	50.20%	1,023	45.73%	8	0.36%	34	1.52%	49	2.19%	100	4.47%	2,237
Wright	1,500	45.96%	1,703	52.18%	11	0.34%	27	0.83%	23	0.70%	-203	-6.22%	3,264
Totals	352,922	51.55%	314,038	45.87%	6,139	0.90%	5,965	0.87%	5,540	0.81%	38,884	5.68%	684,599

== See also ==
- United States presidential elections in Missouri
