= South Township, Dade County, Missouri =

Township in Dade County, Missouri, U.S.

Coordinates: 37.313°N 93.765°W

South Township is a township in Dade County, in the U.S. state of Missouri.

South Township lies in the southern part of Dade County, hence the name.
