= 1908 United States presidential election in Missouri =

- November 3, 1908

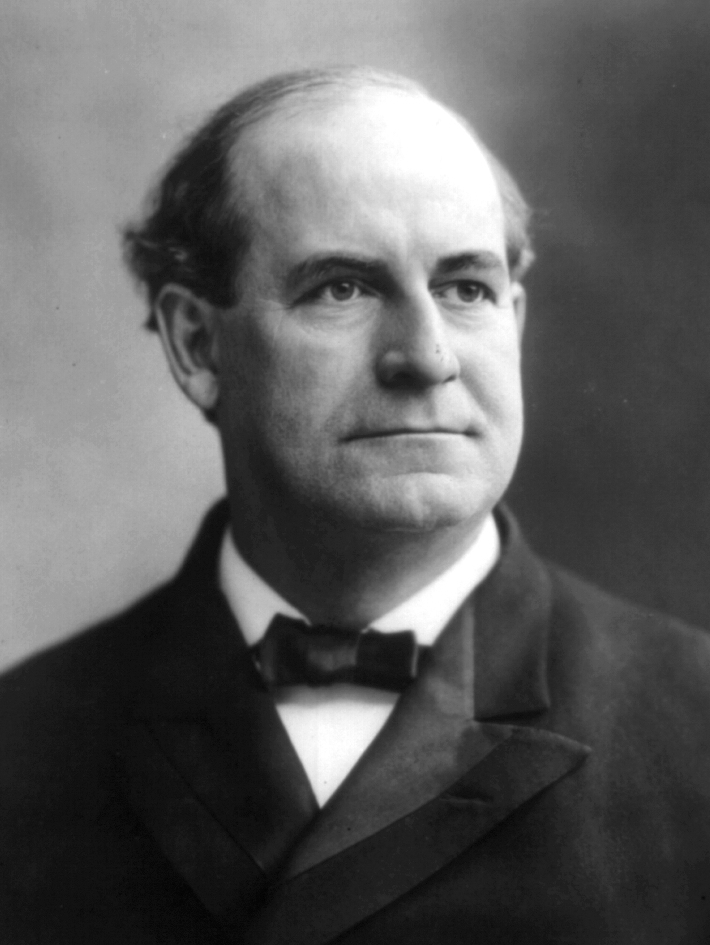
| Nominee | William Howard Taft | William Jennings Bryan |
| Party | Republican | Democratic |
| Home state | Ohio | Nebraska |
| Running mate | James S. Sherman | John W. Kern |
| Electoral vote | 18 | 0 |
| Popular vote | 347,203 | 346,574 |
| Percentage | 48.50% | 48.41% |
County results
Taft
40–50%
50–60%
60–70%
70–80%
80–90%
Bryan
40–50%
50–60%
60–70%
70–80%
80–90%
President before election
Theodore Roosevelt
Republican
Elected President
William Howard Taft
Republican

The 1908 United States presidential election in Missouri took place on November 3, 1908, as part of the 1908 United States presidential election. Voters chose 18 representatives, or electors, to the Electoral College, who voted for president and vice president.

Missouri was very narrowly won by Secretary of War William Howard Taft (R–Ohio), running with James S. Sherman, with 48.50% of the popular vote, against former U.S. Representative William Jennings Bryan (D–Nebraska), running with John W. Kern, with 48.41% of the popular vote. Taft won the state by a narrow margin of 0.09%.

Bryan had previously won Missouri against William McKinley in both 1896 and 1900.

== Results ==
1908 United States presidential election in Missouri
| Party | Candidate | Votes | % |
|---|---|---|---|
| Republican | William Howard Taft | 347,203 | 48.50% |
| Democratic | William Jennings Bryan | 346,574 | 48.41% |
| Socialist | Eugene V. Debs | 15,431 | 2.16% |
| Prohibition | Eugene W. Chafin | 4,284 | 0.60% |
| Populist | Thomas E. Watson | 1,165 | 0.16% |
| Socialist Labor | August Gillhaus | 868 | 0.12% |
| Independence | Thomas L. Hisgen | 402 | 0.06% |

=== Results by county ===
1908 United States presidential election in Missouri by county
| County | William Howard Taft Republican | | William Jennings Bryan Democratic | | Eugene Victor Debs Socialist | | Eugene Wilder Chafin Prohibition | | Thomas Edward Watson Populist | | Various candidates Other parties | | Margin | | Total votes cast |
| County | # | % | # | % | # | % | # | % | # | % | # | % | # | % | Total votes cast |
|---|---|---|---|---|---|---|---|---|---|---|---|---|---|---|---|
| Adair | 2,514 | 51.38% | 1,992 | 40.71% | 270 | 5.52% | 75 | 1.53% | 15 | 0.31% | 27 | 0.55% | 522 | 10.67% | 4,893 |
| Andrew | 2,169 | 54.09% | 1,782 | 44.44% | 15 | 0.37% | 31 | 0.77% | 6 | 0.15% | 7 | 0.17% | 387 | 9.65% | 4,010 |
| Atchison | 1,700 | 49.66% | 1,651 | 48.23% | 18 | 0.53% | 48 | 1.40% | 4 | 0.12% | 2 | 0.06% | 49 | 1.43% | 3,423 |
| Audrain | 1,733 | 33.61% | 3,350 | 64.97% | 15 | 0.29% | 31 | 0.60% | 21 | 0.41% | 6 | 0.12% | -1,617 | -31.36% | 5,156 |
| Barry | 2,526 | 49.62% | 2,383 | 46.81% | 138 | 2.71% | 34 | 0.67% | 4 | 0.08% | 6 | 0.12% | 143 | 2.81% | 5,091 |
| Barton | 1,673 | 43.36% | 1,913 | 49.59% | 192 | 4.98% | 55 | 1.43% | 4 | 0.10% | 21 | 0.54% | -240 | -6.22% | 3,858 |
| Bates | 2,754 | 44.07% | 3,248 | 51.98% | 83 | 1.33% | 119 | 1.90% | 25 | 0.40% | 20 | 0.32% | -494 | -7.91% | 6,249 |
| Benton | 1,924 | 59.09% | 1,280 | 39.31% | 19 | 0.58% | 18 | 0.55% | 12 | 0.37% | 3 | 0.09% | 644 | 19.78% | 3,256 |
| Bollinger | 1,593 | 50.30% | 1,517 | 47.90% | 27 | 0.85% | 25 | 0.79% | 1 | 0.03% | 4 | 0.13% | 76 | 2.40% | 3,167 |
| Boone | 2,149 | 29.63% | 5,041 | 69.49% | 28 | 0.39% | 19 | 0.26% | 15 | 0.21% | 2 | 0.03% | -2,892 | -39.87% | 7,254 |
| Buchanan | 8,394 | 45.34% | 9,836 | 53.13% | 167 | 0.90% | 103 | 0.56% | 4 | 0.02% | 9 | 0.05% | -1,442 | -7.79% | 18,513 |
| Butler | 2,186 | 51.22% | 1,893 | 44.35% | 145 | 3.40% | 27 | 0.63% | 6 | 0.14% | 11 | 0.26% | 293 | 6.87% | 4,268 |
| Caldwell | 2,161 | 57.55% | 1,540 | 41.01% | 4 | 0.11% | 25 | 0.67% | 18 | 0.48% | 7 | 0.19% | 621 | 16.54% | 3,755 |
| Callaway | 1,911 | 32.69% | 3,878 | 66.35% | 13 | 0.22% | 39 | 0.67% | 2 | 0.03% | 2 | 0.03% | -1,967 | -33.65% | 5,845 |
| Camden | 1,446 | 58.90% | 955 | 38.90% | 33 | 1.34% | 12 | 0.49% | 6 | 0.24% | 3 | 0.12% | 491 | 20.00% | 2,455 |
| Cape Girardeau | 3,381 | 55.51% | 2,621 | 43.03% | 28 | 0.46% | 42 | 0.69% | 10 | 0.16% | 9 | 0.15% | 760 | 12.48% | 6,091 |
| Carroll | 3,015 | 51.55% | 2,753 | 47.07% | 31 | 0.53% | 38 | 0.65% | 8 | 0.14% | 4 | 0.07% | 262 | 4.48% | 5,849 |
| Carter | 507 | 43.63% | 591 | 50.86% | 57 | 4.91% | 3 | 0.26% | 3 | 0.26% | 1 | 0.09% | -84 | -7.23% | 1,162 |
| Cass | 2,193 | 39.84% | 3,143 | 57.10% | 108 | 1.96% | 49 | 0.89% | 4 | 0.07% | 7 | 0.13% | -950 | -17.26% | 5,504 |
| Cedar | 1,933 | 54.87% | 1,483 | 42.09% | 60 | 1.70% | 26 | 0.74% | 15 | 0.43% | 6 | 0.17% | 450 | 12.77% | 3,523 |
| Chariton | 2,249 | 39.78% | 3,352 | 59.30% | 12 | 0.21% | 20 | 0.35% | 16 | 0.28% | 4 | 0.07% | -1,103 | -19.51% | 5,653 |
| Christian | 1,871 | 61.08% | 956 | 31.21% | 146 | 4.77% | 62 | 2.02% | 19 | 0.62% | 9 | 0.29% | 915 | 29.87% | 3,063 |
| Clark | 1,741 | 49.52% | 1,737 | 49.40% | 5 | 0.14% | 32 | 0.91% | 0 | 0.00% | 1 | 0.03% | 4 | 0.11% | 3,516 |
| Clay | 1,166 | 24.63% | 3,513 | 74.19% | 25 | 0.53% | 19 | 0.40% | 11 | 0.23% | 1 | 0.02% | -2,347 | -49.57% | 4,735 |
| Clinton | 1,578 | 42.90% | 2,075 | 56.42% | 1 | 0.03% | 19 | 0.52% | 3 | 0.08% | 2 | 0.05% | -497 | -13.51% | 3,678 |
| Cole | 2,402 | 48.58% | 2,494 | 50.44% | 28 | 0.57% | 14 | 0.28% | 2 | 0.04% | 4 | 0.08% | -92 | -1.86% | 4,944 |
| Cooper | 2,679 | 50.73% | 2,555 | 48.38% | 9 | 0.17% | 12 | 0.23% | 16 | 0.30% | 10 | 0.19% | 124 | 2.35% | 5,281 |
| Crawford | 1,752 | 56.77% | 1,260 | 40.83% | 52 | 1.69% | 17 | 0.55% | 2 | 0.06% | 3 | 0.10% | 492 | 15.94% | 3,086 |
| Dade | 1,946 | 56.05% | 1,441 | 41.50% | 41 | 1.18% | 30 | 0.86% | 11 | 0.32% | 3 | 0.09% | 505 | 14.54% | 3,472 |
| Dallas | 1,609 | 61.96% | 955 | 36.77% | 10 | 0.39% | 3 | 0.12% | 17 | 0.65% | 3 | 0.12% | 654 | 25.18% | 2,597 |
| Daviess | 2,388 | 50.14% | 2,294 | 48.16% | 8 | 0.17% | 52 | 1.09% | 18 | 0.38% | 3 | 0.06% | 94 | 1.97% | 4,763 |
| De Kalb | 1,703 | 50.53% | 1,632 | 48.43% | 3 | 0.09% | 28 | 0.83% | 3 | 0.09% | 1 | 0.03% | 71 | 2.11% | 3,370 |
| Dent | 1,290 | 48.44% | 1,330 | 49.94% | 33 | 1.24% | 4 | 0.15% | 4 | 0.15% | 2 | 0.08% | -40 | -1.50% | 2,663 |
| Douglas | 1,922 | 64.84% | 699 | 23.58% | 281 | 9.48% | 17 | 0.57% | 35 | 1.18% | 10 | 0.34% | 1,223 | 41.26% | 2,964 |
| Dunklin | 1,638 | 35.17% | 2,734 | 58.69% | 259 | 5.56% | 21 | 0.45% | 3 | 0.06% | 3 | 0.06% | -1,096 | -23.53% | 4,658 |
| Franklin | 4,049 | 60.91% | 2,423 | 36.45% | 121 | 1.82% | 31 | 0.47% | 4 | 0.06% | 19 | 0.29% | 1,626 | 24.46% | 6,647 |
| Gasconade | 2,220 | 80.35% | 509 | 18.42% | 13 | 0.47% | 10 | 0.36% | 6 | 0.22% | 5 | 0.18% | 1,711 | 61.93% | 2,763 |
| Gentry | 1,882 | 44.75% | 2,236 | 53.16% | 24 | 0.57% | 52 | 1.24% | 11 | 0.26% | 1 | 0.02% | -354 | -8.42% | 4,206 |
| Greene | 6,439 | 49.81% | 5,830 | 45.10% | 453 | 3.50% | 143 | 1.11% | 49 | 0.38% | 14 | 0.11% | 609 | 4.71% | 12,928 |
| Grundy | 2,407 | 62.71% | 1,359 | 35.41% | 12 | 0.31% | 43 | 1.12% | 14 | 0.36% | 3 | 0.08% | 1,048 | 27.31% | 3,838 |
| Harrison | 2,842 | 58.41% | 1,938 | 39.83% | 15 | 0.31% | 50 | 1.03% | 12 | 0.25% | 9 | 0.18% | 904 | 18.58% | 4,866 |
| Henry | 2,854 | 43.30% | 3,577 | 54.27% | 61 | 0.93% | 90 | 1.37% | 6 | 0.09% | 3 | 0.05% | -723 | -10.97% | 6,591 |
| Hickory | 1,182 | 65.52% | 561 | 31.10% | 32 | 1.77% | 12 | 0.67% | 13 | 0.72% | 4 | 0.22% | 621 | 34.42% | 1,804 |
| Holt | 2,246 | 57.62% | 1,596 | 40.94% | 14 | 0.36% | 28 | 0.72% | 7 | 0.18% | 7 | 0.18% | 650 | 16.68% | 3,898 |
| Howard | 1,141 | 28.15% | 2,884 | 71.16% | 7 | 0.17% | 13 | 0.32% | 6 | 0.15% | 2 | 0.05% | -1,743 | -43.01% | 4,053 |
| Howell | 2,164 | 51.09% | 1,827 | 43.13% | 204 | 4.82% | 23 | 0.54% | 3 | 0.07% | 15 | 0.35% | 337 | 7.96% | 4,236 |
| Iron | 828 | 46.60% | 931 | 52.39% | 6 | 0.34% | 8 | 0.45% | 4 | 0.23% | 0 | 0.00% | -103 | -5.80% | 1,777 |
| Jackson | 26,998 | 45.18% | 31,461 | 52.65% | 904 | 1.51% | 248 | 0.41% | 46 | 0.08% | 103 | 0.17% | -4,463 | -7.47% | 59,760 |
| Jasper | 9,143 | 49.02% | 8,130 | 43.59% | 1,026 | 5.50% | 251 | 1.35% | 18 | 0.10% | 84 | 0.45% | 1,013 | 5.43% | 18,652 |
| Jefferson | 3,050 | 52.00% | 2,698 | 46.00% | 65 | 1.11% | 19 | 0.32% | 25 | 0.43% | 8 | 0.14% | 352 | 6.00% | 5,865 |
| Johnson | 2,997 | 45.44% | 3,483 | 52.81% | 69 | 1.05% | 31 | 0.47% | 9 | 0.14% | 6 | 0.09% | -486 | -7.37% | 6,595 |
| Knox | 1,339 | 43.72% | 1,652 | 53.93% | 25 | 0.82% | 35 | 1.14% | 3 | 0.10% | 9 | 0.29% | -313 | -10.22% | 3,063 |
| Laclede | 1,902 | 51.94% | 1,681 | 45.90% | 49 | 1.34% | 14 | 0.38% | 9 | 0.25% | 7 | 0.19% | 221 | 6.03% | 3,662 |
| Lafayette | 3,771 | 48.57% | 3,865 | 49.78% | 98 | 1.26% | 25 | 0.32% | 5 | 0.06% | 0 | 0.00% | -94 | -1.21% | 7,764 |
| Lawrence | 3,028 | 50.87% | 2,532 | 42.54% | 301 | 5.06% | 55 | 0.92% | 8 | 0.13% | 28 | 0.47% | 496 | 8.33% | 5,952 |
| Lewis | 1,473 | 36.89% | 2,439 | 61.08% | 20 | 0.50% | 38 | 0.95% | 17 | 0.43% | 6 | 0.15% | -966 | -24.19% | 3,993 |
| Lincoln | 1,620 | 38.51% | 2,555 | 60.73% | 6 | 0.14% | 17 | 0.40% | 5 | 0.12% | 4 | 0.10% | -935 | -22.22% | 4,207 |
| Linn | 2,974 | 48.66% | 3,000 | 49.08% | 77 | 1.26% | 40 | 0.65% | 17 | 0.28% | 4 | 0.07% | -26 | -0.43% | 6,112 |
| Livingston | 2,400 | 48.92% | 2,379 | 48.49% | 42 | 0.86% | 24 | 0.49% | 55 | 1.12% | 6 | 0.12% | 21 | 0.43% | 4,906 |
| Macon | 3,542 | 45.86% | 3,919 | 50.74% | 172 | 2.23% | 59 | 0.76% | 15 | 0.19% | 17 | 0.22% | -377 | -4.88% | 7,724 |
| Madison | 1,248 | 47.29% | 1,321 | 50.06% | 49 | 1.86% | 17 | 0.64% | 2 | 0.08% | 2 | 0.08% | -73 | -2.77% | 2,639 |
| Maries | 703 | 34.66% | 1,309 | 64.55% | 5 | 0.25% | 10 | 0.49% | 0 | 0.00% | 1 | 0.05% | -606 | -29.88% | 2,028 |
| Marion | 2,554 | 37.71% | 3,982 | 58.80% | 149 | 2.20% | 70 | 1.03% | 8 | 0.12% | 9 | 0.13% | -1,428 | -21.09% | 6,772 |
| McDonald | 1,333 | 48.49% | 1,306 | 47.51% | 80 | 2.91% | 28 | 1.02% | 0 | 0.00% | 2 | 0.07% | 27 | 0.98% | 2,749 |
| Mercer | 1,909 | 68.13% | 852 | 30.41% | 9 | 0.32% | 26 | 0.93% | 5 | 0.18% | 1 | 0.04% | 1,057 | 37.72% | 2,802 |
| Miller | 2,016 | 57.47% | 1,393 | 39.71% | 62 | 1.77% | 15 | 0.43% | 18 | 0.51% | 4 | 0.11% | 623 | 17.76% | 3,508 |
| Mississippi | 1,320 | 44.75% | 1,589 | 53.86% | 12 | 0.41% | 18 | 0.61% | 1 | 0.03% | 10 | 0.34% | -269 | -9.12% | 2,950 |
| Moniteau | 1,691 | 47.63% | 1,763 | 49.66% | 30 | 0.85% | 35 | 0.99% | 28 | 0.79% | 3 | 0.08% | -72 | -2.03% | 3,550 |
| Monroe | 871 | 18.61% | 3,772 | 80.58% | 14 | 0.30% | 9 | 0.19% | 12 | 0.26% | 3 | 0.06% | -2,901 | -61.97% | 4,681 |
| Montgomery | 2,038 | 48.76% | 2,073 | 49.59% | 11 | 0.26% | 42 | 1.00% | 11 | 0.26% | 5 | 0.12% | -35 | -0.84% | 4,180 |
| Morgan | 1,663 | 55.30% | 1,315 | 43.73% | 11 | 0.37% | 11 | 0.37% | 7 | 0.23% | 0 | 0.00% | 348 | 11.57% | 3,007 |
| New Madrid | 1,436 | 42.55% | 1,824 | 54.04% | 72 | 2.13% | 17 | 0.50% | 1 | 0.03% | 25 | 0.74% | -388 | -11.50% | 3,375 |
| Newton | 2,620 | 44.99% | 2,725 | 46.80% | 280 | 4.81% | 158 | 2.71% | 11 | 0.19% | 29 | 0.50% | -105 | -1.80% | 5,823 |
| Nodaway | 3,592 | 49.12% | 3,595 | 49.16% | 52 | 0.71% | 45 | 0.62% | 20 | 0.27% | 9 | 0.12% | -3 | -0.04% | 7,313 |
| Oregon | 729 | 30.31% | 1,550 | 64.45% | 119 | 4.95% | 2 | 0.08% | 2 | 0.08% | 3 | 0.12% | -821 | -34.14% | 2,405 |
| Osage | 1,820 | 55.24% | 1,439 | 43.67% | 4 | 0.12% | 29 | 0.88% | 0 | 0.00% | 3 | 0.09% | 381 | 11.56% | 3,295 |
| Ozark | 1,233 | 65.76% | 594 | 31.68% | 40 | 2.13% | 3 | 0.16% | 4 | 0.21% | 1 | 0.05% | 639 | 34.08% | 1,875 |
| Pemiscot | 1,390 | 43.93% | 1,725 | 54.52% | 39 | 1.23% | 6 | 0.19% | 1 | 0.03% | 3 | 0.09% | -335 | -10.59% | 3,164 |
| Perry | 1,775 | 52.53% | 1,569 | 46.43% | 1 | 0.03% | 28 | 0.83% | 2 | 0.06% | 4 | 0.12% | 206 | 6.10% | 3,379 |
| Pettis | 3,983 | 49.39% | 3,791 | 47.01% | 195 | 2.42% | 86 | 1.07% | 2 | 0.02% | 7 | 0.09% | 192 | 2.38% | 8,064 |
| Phelps | 1,520 | 45.00% | 1,804 | 53.40% | 21 | 0.62% | 9 | 0.27% | 22 | 0.65% | 2 | 0.06% | -284 | -8.41% | 3,378 |
| Pike | 2,403 | 41.78% | 3,326 | 57.82% | 10 | 0.17% | 8 | 0.14% | 4 | 0.07% | 1 | 0.02% | -923 | -16.05% | 5,752 |
| Platte | 982 | 25.84% | 2,795 | 73.53% | 6 | 0.16% | 16 | 0.42% | 2 | 0.05% | 0 | 0.00% | -1,813 | -47.70% | 3,801 |
| Polk | 2,670 | 54.43% | 2,139 | 43.61% | 39 | 0.80% | 35 | 0.71% | 19 | 0.39% | 3 | 0.06% | 531 | 10.83% | 4,905 |
| Pulaski | 988 | 40.31% | 1,418 | 57.85% | 28 | 1.14% | 11 | 0.45% | 6 | 0.24% | 0 | 0.00% | -430 | -17.54% | 2,451 |
| Putnam | 2,233 | 65.77% | 1,056 | 31.10% | 52 | 1.53% | 48 | 1.41% | 1 | 0.03% | 5 | 0.15% | 1,177 | 34.67% | 3,395 |
| Ralls | 900 | 31.35% | 1,947 | 67.82% | 11 | 0.38% | 9 | 0.31% | 2 | 0.07% | 2 | 0.07% | -1,047 | -36.47% | 2,871 |
| Randolph | 1,953 | 31.10% | 4,245 | 67.60% | 12 | 0.19% | 44 | 0.70% | 25 | 0.40% | 1 | 0.02% | -2,292 | -36.50% | 6,280 |
| Ray | 1,914 | 37.74% | 3,043 | 60.00% | 57 | 1.12% | 46 | 0.91% | 3 | 0.06% | 9 | 0.18% | -1,129 | -22.26% | 5,072 |
| Reynolds | 544 | 33.13% | 1,052 | 64.07% | 42 | 2.56% | 1 | 0.06% | 2 | 0.12% | 1 | 0.06% | -508 | -30.94% | 1,642 |
| Ripley | 946 | 40.95% | 1,309 | 56.67% | 4 | 0.17% | 16 | 0.69% | 33 | 1.43% | 2 | 0.09% | -363 | -15.71% | 2,310 |
| Saint Charles | 3,480 | 62.84% | 1,979 | 35.73% | 42 | 0.76% | 19 | 0.34% | 2 | 0.04% | 16 | 0.29% | 1,501 | 27.10% | 5,538 |
| Saint Clair | 1,723 | 46.50% | 1,877 | 50.66% | 72 | 1.94% | 12 | 0.32% | 19 | 0.51% | 2 | 0.05% | -154 | -4.16% | 3,705 |
| Saint Francois | 3,260 | 48.56% | 2,942 | 43.83% | 439 | 6.54% | 40 | 0.60% | 12 | 0.18% | 20 | 0.30% | 318 | 4.74% | 6,713 |
| Saint Louis County | 10,177 | 66.40% | 4,522 | 29.51% | 450 | 2.94% | 50 | 0.33% | 10 | 0.07% | 117 | 0.76% | 5,655 | 36.90% | 15,326 |
| Saint Louis City | 74,160 | 52.76% | 60,917 | 43.34% | 4,965 | 3.53% | 209 | 0.15% | 35 | 0.02% | 264 | 0.19% | 13,243 | 9.42% | 140,550 |
| Sainte Genevieve | 1,064 | 48.78% | 1,108 | 50.80% | 4 | 0.18% | 1 | 0.05% | 4 | 0.18% | 0 | 0.00% | -44 | -2.02% | 2,181 |
| Saline | 2,926 | 40.73% | 4,189 | 58.31% | 31 | 0.43% | 22 | 0.31% | 10 | 0.14% | 6 | 0.08% | -1,263 | -17.58% | 7,184 |
| Schuyler | 1,007 | 43.76% | 1,222 | 53.11% | 19 | 0.83% | 42 | 1.83% | 8 | 0.35% | 3 | 0.13% | -215 | -9.34% | 2,301 |
| Scotland | 1,273 | 43.94% | 1,564 | 53.99% | 19 | 0.66% | 25 | 0.86% | 9 | 0.31% | 7 | 0.24% | -291 | -10.04% | 2,897 |
| Scott | 1,473 | 36.79% | 1,853 | 46.28% | 629 | 15.71% | 17 | 0.42% | 6 | 0.15% | 26 | 0.65% | -380 | -9.49% | 4,004 |
| Shannon | 849 | 40.94% | 1,151 | 55.50% | 62 | 2.99% | 4 | 0.19% | 2 | 0.10% | 6 | 0.29% | -302 | -14.56% | 2,074 |
| Shelby | 1,298 | 33.93% | 2,466 | 64.47% | 17 | 0.44% | 39 | 1.02% | 2 | 0.05% | 3 | 0.08% | -1,168 | -30.54% | 3,825 |
| Stoddard | 2,025 | 39.87% | 2,736 | 53.87% | 277 | 5.45% | 35 | 0.69% | 2 | 0.04% | 4 | 0.08% | -711 | -14.00% | 5,079 |
| Stone | 1,376 | 69.11% | 477 | 23.96% | 126 | 6.33% | 3 | 0.15% | 1 | 0.05% | 8 | 0.40% | 899 | 45.15% | 1,991 |
| Sullivan | 2,389 | 50.61% | 2,269 | 48.07% | 20 | 0.42% | 35 | 0.74% | 5 | 0.11% | 2 | 0.04% | 120 | 2.54% | 4,720 |
| Taney | 1,080 | 61.12% | 628 | 35.54% | 53 | 3.00% | 2 | 0.11% | 3 | 0.17% | 1 | 0.06% | 452 | 25.58% | 1,767 |
| Texas | 1,954 | 44.61% | 2,328 | 53.15% | 61 | 1.39% | 18 | 0.41% | 7 | 0.16% | 12 | 0.27% | -374 | -8.54% | 4,380 |
| Vernon | 2,369 | 37.48% | 3,705 | 58.61% | 170 | 2.69% | 56 | 0.89% | 6 | 0.09% | 15 | 0.24% | -1,336 | -21.14% | 6,321 |
| Warren | 1,714 | 76.14% | 484 | 21.50% | 42 | 1.87% | 5 | 0.22% | 6 | 0.27% | 0 | 0.00% | 1,230 | 54.64% | 2,251 |
| Washington | 1,753 | 56.11% | 1,330 | 42.57% | 18 | 0.58% | 20 | 0.64% | 1 | 0.03% | 2 | 0.06% | 423 | 13.54% | 3,124 |
| Wayne | 1,554 | 47.11% | 1,641 | 49.74% | 84 | 2.55% | 13 | 0.39% | 2 | 0.06% | 5 | 0.15% | -87 | -2.64% | 3,299 |
| Webster | 1,901 | 49.48% | 1,761 | 45.84% | 75 | 1.95% | 62 | 1.61% | 37 | 0.96% | 6 | 0.16% | 140 | 3.64% | 3,842 |
| Worth | 985 | 48.43% | 993 | 48.82% | 3 | 0.15% | 45 | 2.21% | 7 | 0.34% | 1 | 0.05% | -8 | -0.39% | 2,034 |
| Wright | 2,149 | 58.21% | 1,469 | 39.79% | 57 | 1.54% | 9 | 0.24% | 5 | 0.14% | 3 | 0.08% | 680 | 18.42% | 3,692 |
| Totals | 347,203 | 48.50% | 346,574 | 48.41% | 15,431 | 2.16% | 4,209 | 0.59% | 1,165 | 0.16% | 1,259 | 0.18% | 629 | 0.09% | 715,841 |

== See also ==
- United States presidential elections in Missouri
