= Meinert, Missouri =

Unincorporated community in Missouri, U.S.

Coordinates: 37°20′07″N 93°59′27″W

Meinert is an unincorporated community in Dade County, in the U.S. state of Missouri.

== History ==
A post office called Meinert was established in 1890, and remained in operation until 1907. The community has the name of the original owner of the town site.
