= Viola, Missouri =

Viola
- unincorporated community
- Location within Missouri
- Coordinates: 36°34′23″N 93°34′56″W
- Country: United States
- State: Missouri
- County: Barry and Stone Counties
- Founded: 1894

Viola is an unincorporated community on Route 39 on the border between Barry and Stone counties in the U.S. state of Missouri. Viola is also situated adjacent to Table Rock Lake between the Kings River arm to the west and the main White River portion of the lake to the north.

The Stone County portion of Viola is part of the Branson, Missouri Micropolitan Statistical Area.

A post office was established on the Barry County side at Viola in 1893, and remained in operation until 1974. The community was named after an unidentified local girl.
