= Marion Township, Dade County, Missouri =

Township in the US state of Missouri

Coordinates: 37.420577°N 94.033984°W

Marion Township is a township in Dade County, in the U.S. state of Missouri.

Marion Township has the name of Francis Marion, an officer in the Revolutionary War.
