= Kings Point, Missouri =

Unincorporated community in Missouri, U.S.

Coordinates: 37°19′16″N 93°56′05″W

Kings Point is an unincorporated community in Dade County, in the U.S. state of Missouri.

== History ==
A post office called Kings Point was established in 1848, and remained in operation until 1909. The community was named after Samuel King, the original owner of the site.
