= Sylvania, Missouri =

Unincorporated community in Missouri, U.S.

Coordinates: 37°30′28″N 94°01′22″W

Sylvania is an unincorporated community in northwest Dade County, Missouri, United States. Sylvania is located at the intersection of Missouri routes D and E, south of Jerico Springs. The Stony Point Prairie Conservation Area lies just to the north along route D.

== History ==
A post office called Sylvania was established in 1869, and remained in operation until 1907. The community's name is derived from Pennsylvania, the home base state of a coal company operating in the area.

== School ==
When rural school consolidation came to Missouri, Dade County reorganized most of its common districts into four larger systems centered on Greenfield, Lockwood, Dadeville, and Everton, circa 1952. (Missouri Annual Reports of Public Schools, 1953, page 32) The Sylvania area was included in the new Lockwood R-I district, though the Sylvania community was still a significant distance away from that school. The state board of education had originally intended much of the Cedarville and Sylvania areas be assigned to the Jerico Springs school district in Cedar County, but that body closed their high school during World War II. (Missouri Annual Reports of Public Schools, 1932, page 405)

A compromise was reached, whereas the rural elementary students in the northern part of the new Lockwood R-I School District would be sent to a consolidated elementary school to be constructed in Sylvania. This new school was completed in 1954; however it only remained in use until about 1962. Its closure was the result of the passing a bond issue over the objections of those in the northern part of the district after multiple previous attempts, allowing the district to construct a new high school in Lockwood and expand the elementary school there sufficiently to house the students attending Sylvania. A lawsuit filed by Sylvania area residents to keep the Sylvania school open, Montgomery V. Reorganized School District No. 1, was dismissed by the Dade County Circuit Court, upheld on appeal in 1960. (Montgomery V. Reorganized School District No. 1, Supreme Court of Missouri. Division No. 2, November 14, 1960.339 S.W.2d 831 (1960))
