= Cedar Springs, Missouri =

Unincorporated community in Missouri, U.S.

Coordinates: 37°52′25″N 93°53′37″W

Cedar Springs is an unincorporated community in Cedar County, in the U.S. state of Missouri.

== History ==
A variant name was Balm. The first permanent settlement at Balm was made in 1844. A post office called Balm was established in 1885, the name was changed to Cedar Springs in 1910, and the post office closed in 1937.

The only things that remain of Cedar Springs are about 12 homesteads and a road called Monroe St. of the original town.

== Location ==
Located east of El Dorado Springs. From the junction of US route 52 and Missouri highway 32, drive due east on route 52 for approximately 6.6 miles. Here Missouri Highway 39 intersects route 52. at this junction turn to the north (Left) on route DD. in 415 yards turn off on 951 Rd and after another about 300 yards you will arrive where Cedar Springs is located.

Coordinates for this community are: 37.875889, -93.894123
