= Arcola, Missouri =

- Village
- Location of Arcola, Missouri
- Coordinates: 37°32′57″N 93°52′31″W
- Country: United States
- State: Missouri
- County: Dade

Area
  - Total: 0.25 sq mi (0.66 km^{2})
  - Land: 0.25 sq mi (0.66 km^{2})
  - Water: 0 sq mi (0.00 km^{2})
- Elevation: 1,024 ft (312 m)

Population (2020)
  - Total: 37
  - Density: 144.3/sq mi (55.73/km^{2})
- Time zone: UTC-6 (Central (CST))
  - Summer (DST): UTC-5 (CDT)
- ZIP code: 65603
- Area code: 417
- FIPS code: 29-01720
- GNIS feature ID: 2397980

Arcola is a village in Dade County, Missouri, United States. The population was 37 at the 2020 census.

== History ==
A post office called Arcola has been in operation since 1873. The village's name commemorates the Battle of the Bridge of Arcole, in Italy.

== Geography ==
According to the United States Census Bureau, the village has a total area of 0.30 square miles (0.78 km^{2}), all land.

== Demographics ==
Historical population
| Census | Pop. | Note | %± |
|---|---|---|---|
| 1970 | 80 | | — |
| 1980 | 136 | | 70.0% |
| 1990 | 72 | | −47.1% |
| 2000 | 45 | | −37.5% |
| 2010 | 55 | | 22.2% |
| 2020 | 37 | | −32.7% |
U.S. Decennial Census

=== 2010 census ===
As of the census of 2010, there were 55 people, 31 households, and 16 families living in the village. The population density was 183.3 inhabitants per square mile (70.8/km^{2}). There were 53 housing units at an average density of 176.7 per square mile (68.2/km^{2}). The racial makeup of the village was 100.0% White. Hispanic or Latino of any race were 1.8% of the population.

There were 31 households, of which 9.7% had children under the age of 18 living with them, 38.7% were married couples living together, 6.5% had a female householder with no husband present, 6.5% had a male householder with no wife present, and 48.4% were non-families. 48.4% of all households were made up of individuals, and 32.2% had someone living alone who was 65 years of age or older. The average household size was 1.77 and the average family size was 2.38.

The median age in the village was 63.2 years. 12.7% of residents were under the age of 18; 3.6% were between the ages of 18 and 24; 12.7% were from 25 to 44; 25.4% were from 45 to 64; and 45.5% were 65 years of age or older. The gender makeup of the village was 50.9% male and 49.1% female.

=== 2000 census ===
As of the census of 2000, there were 45 people, 23 households, and 12 families living in the village. The population density was 155.0 inhabitants per square mile (59.8/km^{2}). There were 31 housing units at an average density of 106.8 per square mile (41.2/km^{2}). The racial makeup of the village was 100.00% White.

There were 23 households, out of which 21.7% had children under the age of 18 living with them, 43.5% were married couples living together, 4.3% had a female householder with no husband present, and 47.8% were non-families. 43.5% of all households were made up of individuals, and 39.1% had someone living alone who was 65 years of age or older. The average household size was 1.96 and the average family size was 2.67.

In the village, the population was spread out, with 22.2% under the age of 18, 15.6% from 25 to 44, 26.7% from 45 to 64, and 35.6% who were 65 years of age or older. The median age was 56 years. For every 100 females, there were 95.7 males. For every 100 females age 18 and over, there were 84.2 males.

The median income for a household in the village was $15,938, and the median income for a family was $33,250. Males had a median income of $0 versus $22,500 for females. The per capita income for the village was $13,123. There were 36.4% of families and 34.0% of the population living below the poverty line, including 50.0% of under eighteens and 35.3% of those over 64.
