= 1892 United States presidential election in Missouri =

- November 8, 1892

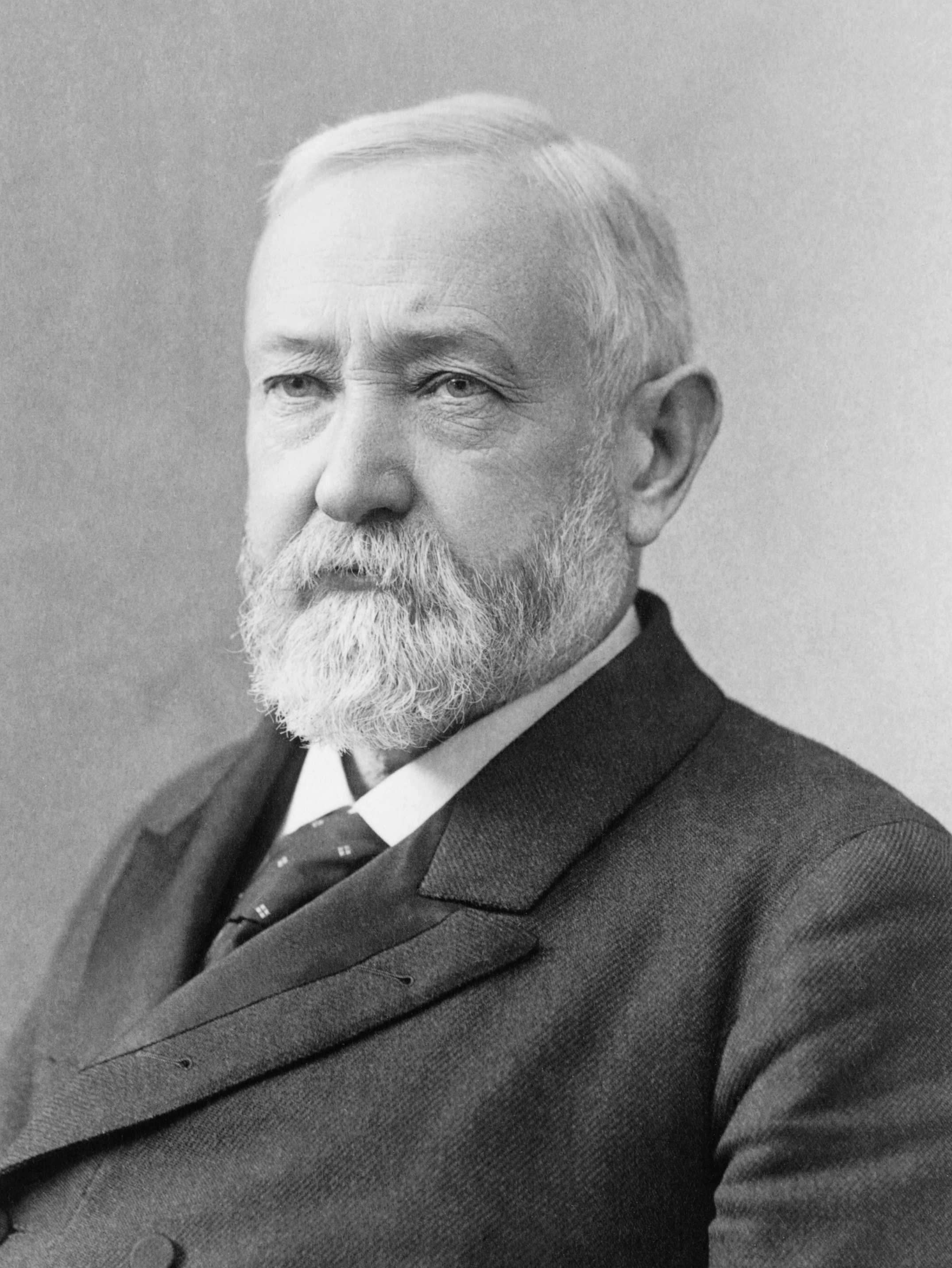

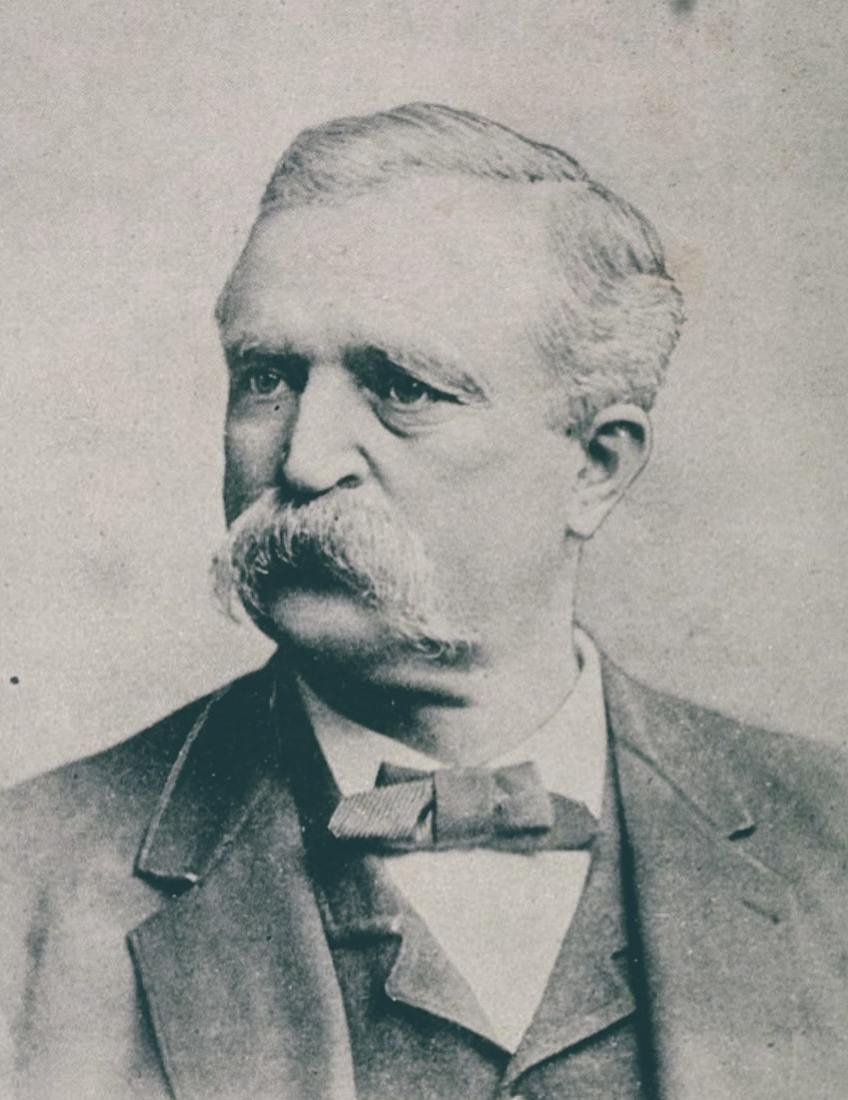
Nominee	Grover Cleveland	Benjamin Harrison	James B. Weaver
Party	Democratic	Republican	Populist
Home state	New York	Indiana	Iowa
Running mate	Adlai Stevenson I	Whitelaw Reid	James G. Field
Electoral vote	17	0	0
Popular vote	268,400	227,646	41,204
Percentage	49.56%	42.03%	7.61%
County results
Cleveland
30–40%
40–50%
50–60%
60–70%
70–80%
80–90%
Harrison
40–50%
50–60%
60–70%
70–80%
President before election
Benjamin Harrison
Republican
Elected President
Grover Cleveland
Democratic

The 1892 United States presidential election in Missouri took place on November 8, 1892. All contemporary 44 states were part of the 1892 United States presidential election. Voters chose 17 electors to the Electoral College, which selected the president and vice president.

Missouri was won by the Democratic nominees, former President Grover Cleveland of New York and his running mate Adlai Stevenson I of Illinois.

== Results ==
1892 United States presidential election in Missouri
Party	Candidate	Votes	Percentage	Electoral votes
Democratic	Grover Cleveland	268,400	49.56%	17
Republican	Benjamin Harrison (incumbent)	227,646	42.03%	0
People's	James B. Weaver	41,204	7.61%	0
Prohibition	John Bidwell	4,333	0.80%	0
Totals		541,583	100.00%	17
Voter turnout				—

=== Results by county ===
1892 United States presidential election in Missouri by county
County	Grover Cleveland Democratic		Benjamin Harrison Republican		James B. Weaver Populist		John Bidwell Prohibition		Margin		Total votes cast
County	#	%	#	%	#	%	#	%	#	%	Total votes cast
Adair	1,039	26.63%	1,953	50.05%	893	22.89%	17	0.44%	-914	-23.42%	3,902
Andrew	1,505	39.84%	1,834	48.54%	392	10.38%	47	1.24%	-329	-8.71%	3,778
Atchison	1,147	33.56%	1,093	31.98%	1,114	32.59%	64	1.87%	33 (Note: In this county where Weaver ran second ahead of Harrison, margin given is Cleveland vote minus Weaver vote and percentage margin is Cleveland percentage minus Weaver percentage.)	0.97%	3,418
Audrain	3,240	66.01%	1,408	28.69%	241	4.91%	19	0.39%	1,832	37.33%	4,908
Barry	1,904	42.18%	1,940	42.98%	633	14.02%	37	0.82%	-36	-0.80%	4,514
Barton	1,620	40.61%	1,335	33.47%	869	21.78%	165	4.14%	285	7.14%	3,989
Bates	3,007	43.12%	1,928	27.65%	1,897	27.20%	142	2.04%	1,079	15.47%	6,974
Benton	1,058	34.37%	1,570	51.01%	433	14.07%	17	0.55%	-512	-16.63%	3,078
Bollinger	1,338	52.80%	1,145	45.19%	48	1.89%	3	0.12%	193	7.62%	2,534
Boone	4,054	69.82%	1,495	25.75%	227	3.91%	30	0.52%	2,559	44.08%	5,806
Buchanan	6,949	53.99%	5,522	42.90%	342	2.66%	59	0.46%	1,427	11.09%	12,872
Butler	1,233	49.58%	1,052	42.30%	194	7.80%	8	0.32%	181	7.28%	2,487
Caldwell	1,388	37.41%	1,750	47.17%	545	14.69%	27	0.73%	-362	-9.76%	3,710
Callaway	3,620	68.35%	1,453	27.44%	208	3.93%	15	0.28%	2,167	40.92%	5,296
Camden	602	30.37%	1,070	53.99%	301	15.19%	9	0.45%	-468	-23.61%	1,982
Cape Girardeau	1,996	43.33%	2,203	47.83%	390	8.47%	17	0.37%	-207	-4.49%	4,606
Carroll	2,969	47.68%	2,896	46.51%	294	4.72%	68	1.09%	73	1.17%	6,227
Carter	617	61.03%	377	37.29%	13	1.29%	4	0.40%	240	23.74%	1,011
Cass	3,027	55.89%	1,908	35.23%	409	7.55%	72	1.33%	1,119	20.66%	5,416
Cedar	1,246	38.19%	1,354	41.50%	624	19.12%	39	1.20%	-108	-3.31%	3,263
Chariton	3,463	60.55%	2,057	35.97%	180	3.15%	19	0.33%	1,406	24.58%	5,719
Christian	653	22.75%	1,559	54.32%	643	22.40%	15	0.52%	-906	-31.57%	2,870
Clark	1,807	50.94%	1,684	47.48%	16	0.45%	40	1.13%	123	3.47%	3,547
Clay	3,085	69.92%	738	16.73%	518	11.74%	71	1.61%	2,347	53.20%	4,412
Clinton	2,131	55.02%	1,503	38.81%	183	4.73%	56	1.45%	628	16.21%	3,873
Cole	1,844	50.33%	1,752	47.82%	62	1.69%	6	0.16%	92	2.51%	3,664
Cooper	2,484	50.59%	2,222	45.25%	198	4.03%	6	0.12%	262	5.34%	4,910
Crawford	1,176	47.21%	1,269	50.94%	40	1.61%	6	0.24%	-93	-3.73%	2,491
Dade	1,101	31.59%	1,420	40.75%	903	25.91%	61	1.75%	-319	-9.15%	3,485
Dallas	586	24.84%	1,174	49.77%	591	25.05%	8	0.34%	583 (Note: In this county where Weaver ran second ahead of Cleveland, margin given is Harrison vote minus Weaver vote and percentage margin is Harrison percentage minus Weaver percentage.)	24.71%	2,359
Daviess	2,257	47.59%	2,019	42.57%	433	9.13%	34	0.72%	238	5.02%	4,743
DeKalb	1,372	42.64%	1,339	41.61%	475	14.76%	32	0.99%	33	1.03%	3,218
Dent	1,268	57.72%	896	40.78%	27	1.23%	6	0.27%	372	16.93%	2,197
Douglas	328	13.34%	1,309	53.23%	813	33.06%	9	0.37%	496	20.17%	2,459
Dunklin	2,167	72.33%	659	22.00%	166	5.54%	4	0.13%	1,508	50.33%	2,996
Franklin	2,498	43.80%	2,987	52.38%	204	3.58%	14	0.25%	-489	-8.57%	5,703
Gasconade	602	26.95%	1,625	72.74%	7	0.31%	0	0.00%	-1,023	-45.79%	2,234
Gentry	2,003	47.15%	1,607	37.83%	580	13.65%	58	1.37%	396	9.32%	4,248
Greene	4,051	38.35%	4,839	45.81%	1,497	14.17%	176	1.67%	-788	-7.46%	10,563
Grundy	1,375	33.83%	2,468	60.71%	188	4.62%	34	0.84%	-1,093	-26.89%	4,065
Harrison	1,630	34.81%	2,474	52.83%	539	11.51%	40	0.85%	-844	-18.02%	4,683
Henry	3,475	53.13%	2,563	39.19%	399	6.10%	103	1.57%	912	13.94%	6,540
Hickory	423	22.74%	927	49.84%	491	26.40%	19	1.02%	436	23.44%	1,860
Holt	1,427	38.76%	1,899	51.58%	296	8.04%	60	1.63%	-472	-12.82%	3,682
Howard	2,570	68.52%	1,052	28.05%	96	2.56%	33	0.88%	1,518	40.47%	3,751
Howell	1,642	46.40%	1,484	41.93%	360	10.17%	53	1.50%	158	4.46%	3,539
Iron	880	60.03%	568	38.74%	15	1.02%	3	0.20%	312	21.28%	1,466
Jackson	15,825	55.90%	11,044	39.02%	1,219	4.31%	219	0.77%	4,781	16.89%	28,307
Jasper	4,805	39.55%	5,369	44.19%	1,821	14.99%	155	1.28%	-564	-4.64%	12,150
Jefferson	2,617	53.01%	2,207	44.70%	41	0.83%	72	1.46%	410	8.30%	4,937
Johnson	3,109	48.12%	2,667	41.28%	624	9.66%	61	0.94%	442	6.84%	6,461
Knox	1,472	48.20%	968	31.70%	581	19.02%	33	1.08%	504	16.50%	3,054
Laclede	1,223	38.30%	1,376	43.09%	578	18.10%	16	0.50%	-153	-4.79%	3,193
Lafayette	3,922	55.83%	2,833	40.33%	235	3.35%	35	0.50%	1,089	15.50%	7,025
Lawrence	2,428	41.14%	2,623	44.44%	791	13.40%	60	1.02%	-195	-3.30%	5,902
Lewis	2,220	59.60%	1,322	35.49%	146	3.92%	37	0.99%	898	24.11%	3,725
Lincoln	2,508	63.88%	1,380	35.15%	23	0.59%	15	0.38%	1,128	28.73%	3,926
Linn	2,523	45.37%	2,501	44.97%	470	8.45%	67	1.20%	22	0.40%	5,561
Livingston	2,190	43.63%	1,958	39.01%	833	16.60%	38	0.76%	232	4.62%	5,019
Macon	3,284	48.19%	2,746	40.30%	739	10.85%	45	0.66%	538	7.90%	6,814
Madison	1,010	57.98%	635	36.45%	68	3.90%	29	1.66%	375	21.53%	1,742
Maries	1,119	69.20%	469	29.00%	25	1.55%	4	0.25%	650	40.20%	1,617
Marion	3,634	61.52%	2,154	36.47%	29	0.49%	90	1.52%	1,480	25.06%	5,907
McDonald	1,026	46.64%	835	37.95%	319	14.50%	20	0.91%	191	8.68%	2,200
Mercer	809	27.45%	1,643	55.75%	455	15.44%	40	1.36%	-834	-28.30%	2,947
Miller	1,076	36.82%	1,497	51.23%	338	11.57%	11	0.38%	-421	-14.41%	2,922
Mississippi	1,240	60.31%	734	35.70%	70	3.40%	12	0.58%	506	24.61%	2,056
Moniteau	1,340	40.24%	1,326	39.82%	649	19.49%	15	0.45%	14	0.42%	3,330
Monroe	3,863	81.33%	787	16.57%	82	1.73%	18	0.38%	3,076	64.76%	4,750
Montgomery	1,916	50.18%	1,665	43.61%	161	4.22%	76	1.99%	251	6.57%	3,818
Morgan	1,143	45.39%	1,088	43.21%	281	11.16%	6	0.24%	55	2.18%	2,518
New Madrid	1,215	73.77%	361	21.92%	69	4.19%	2	0.12%	854	51.85%	1,647
Newton	1,978	42.26%	1,883	40.24%	725	15.49%	94	2.01%	95	2.03%	4,680
Nodaway	2,913	42.49%	2,878	41.98%	961	14.02%	104	1.52%	35	0.51%	6,856
Oregon	1,118	69.05%	318	19.64%	175	10.81%	8	0.49%	800	49.41%	1,619
Osage	1,266	47.15%	1,378	51.32%	17	0.63%	24	0.89%	-112	-4.17%	2,685
Ozark	387	25.15%	881	57.24%	262	17.02%	9	0.58%	-494	-32.10%	1,539
Pemiscot	700	82.84%	133	15.74%	9	1.07%	3	0.36%	567	67.10%	845
Perry	1,464	52.93%	1,297	46.89%	4	0.14%	1	0.04%	167	6.04%	2,766
Pettis	3,680	48.95%	3,610	48.02%	144	1.92%	84	1.12%	70	0.93%	7,518
Phelps	1,287	53.94%	883	37.01%	206	8.63%	10	0.42%	404	16.93%	2,386
Pike	3,655	58.08%	2,564	40.74%	40	0.64%	34	0.54%	1,091	17.34%	6,293
Platte	2,664	71.38%	885	23.71%	149	3.99%	34	0.91%	1,779	47.67%	3,732
Polk	1,211	29.03%	1,918	45.98%	1,012	24.26%	30	0.72%	-707	-16.95%	4,171
Pulaski	1,046	59.16%	663	37.50%	53	3.00%	6	0.34%	383	21.66%	1,768
Putnam	1,131	34.73%	2,027	62.24%	74	2.27%	25	0.77%	-896	-27.51%	3,257
Ralls	1,968	70.31%	802	28.65%	18	0.64%	11	0.39%	1,166	41.66%	2,799
Randolph	3,695	65.90%	1,709	30.48%	166	2.96%	37	0.66%	1,986	35.42%	5,607
Ray	3,250	63.86%	1,643	32.29%	154	3.03%	42	0.83%	1,607	31.58%	5,089
Reynolds	903	75.69%	281	23.55%	8	0.67%	1	0.08%	622	52.14%	1,193
Ripley	812	55.46%	446	30.46%	205	14.00%	1	0.07%	366	25.00%	1,464
Saint Charles	2,485	49.27%	2,522	50.00%	26	0.52%	11	0.22%	-37	-0.73%	5,044
Saint Clair	1,572	42.46%	1,510	40.79%	600	16.21%	20	0.54%	62	1.67%	3,702
Saint Francois	2,141	62.42%	1,253	36.53%	20	0.58%	16	0.47%	888	25.89%	3,430
Saint Louis County	3,116	41.26%	4,367	57.83%	30	0.40%	39	0.52%	-1,251	-16.57%	7,552
Saint Louis City	34,669	48.73%	35,528	49.94%	695	0.98%	247	0.35%	-859	-1.21%	71,139
Sainte Genevieve	1,155	60.89%	683	36.00%	59	3.11%	0	0.00%	472	24.88%	1,897
Saline	4,565	57.99%	2,622	33.31%	627	7.96%	58	0.74%	1,943	24.68%	7,872
Schuyler	1,263	51.28%	996	40.44%	190	7.71%	14	0.57%	267	10.84%	2,463
Scotland	1,369	48.48%	940	33.29%	497	17.60%	18	0.64%	429	15.19%	2,824
Scott	1,612	68.86%	671	28.66%	51	2.18%	7	0.30%	941	40.20%	2,341
Shannon	1,005	63.25%	541	34.05%	35	2.20%	8	0.50%	464	29.20%	1,589
Shelby	2,252	63.72%	1,128	31.92%	113	3.20%	41	1.16%	1,124	31.81%	3,534
Stoddard	2,220	61.92%	1,218	33.97%	131	3.65%	16	0.45%	1,002	27.95%	3,585
Stone	279	21.35%	805	61.59%	215	16.45%	8	0.61%	-526	-40.24%	1,307
Sullivan	2,095	48.01%	2,173	49.79%	76	1.74%	20	0.46%	-78	-1.79%	4,364
Taney	459	34.41%	791	59.30%	82	6.15%	2	0.15%	-332	-24.89%	1,334
Texas	1,878	52.95%	1,294	36.48%	353	9.95%	22	0.62%	584	16.46%	3,547
Vernon	3,627	57.13%	1,847	29.09%	773	12.18%	102	1.61%	1,780	28.04%	6,349
Warren	685	32.67%	1,360	64.85%	43	2.05%	9	0.43%	-675	-32.19%	2,097
Washington	1,303	51.62%	1,200	47.54%	12	0.48%	9	0.36%	103	4.08%	2,524
Wayne	1,393	57.59%	964	39.85%	49	2.03%	13	0.54%	429	17.73%	2,419
Webster	1,273	41.59%	1,389	45.38%	382	12.48%	17	0.56%	-116	-3.79%	3,061
Worth	696	37.32%	624	33.46%	486	26.06%	59	3.16%	72	3.86%	1,865
Wright	786	27.12%	1,454	50.17%	643	22.19%	15	0.52%	-668	-23.05%	2,898
Totals	268,400	49.56%	227,646	42.03%	41,204	7.61%	4,330	0.80%	40,754	7.53%	541,580

== See also ==
- United States presidential elections in Missouri
