= Washington Township, Dade County, Missouri =

Township in Dade County, Missouri, U.S.

Coordinates: 37.37°N 93.86°W

Washington Township is a township in Dade County, in the U.S. state of Missouri.

Washington Township has the name of President George Washington.
