= Carr Lane, Missouri =

Unincorporated community in Missouri, U.S.

Coordinates: 36°30′28″N 93°33′57″W

Carr Lane is an unincorporated community in Stone County, Missouri, United States. Located at the intersection of State Routes 39 and 86, it lies approximately one mile north of the Arkansas state line and one mile east of the Stone - Barry county line. The community is part of the Branson, Missouri Micropolitan Statistical Area.

== History ==
A variant name was "Carr". A post office called Carr was established in 1884, and remained in operation until 1918. The community once contained the Carr Lane Schoolhouse. The area has the name of the local Carr family.
