= Lockwood, Missouri =

- City
- Location of Lockwood, Missouri
- Coordinates: 37°23′12″N 93°57′28″W
- Country: United States
- State: Missouri
- County: Dade

Area
  - Total: 0.98 sq mi (2.55 km^{2})
  - Land: 0.97 sq mi (2.51 km^{2})
  - Water: 0.015 sq mi (0.04 km^{2})
- Elevation: 1,083 ft (330 m)

Population (2020)
  - Total: 846
  - Density: 871.5/sq mi (336.47/km^{2})
- Time zone: UTC-6 (Central (CST))
  - Summer (DST): UTC-5 (CDT)
- ZIP code: 65682
- Area code: 417
- FIPS code: 29-43490
- GNIS feature ID: 2395742
- Website: www.lockwoodmo.com

Lockwood is a city in Dade County, Missouri, United States. The population was 846 at the 2020 census.

== History ==
Lockwood was platted in 1881. The community was named after J. E. Lockwood, a railroad official. A post office has been in operation at Lockwood since 1881.

== Geography ==
According to the United States Census Bureau, the city has a total area of 0.99 square miles (2.56 km^{2}), of which 0.97 square miles (2.51 km^{2}) is land and 0.02 square miles (0.05 km^{2}) is water.

=== Climate ===
According to the Köppen classification, Lockwood has a humid subtropical climate bordering on humid continental.

Climate data for Lockwood, Missouri (1991–2020 normals, extremes 1904–present)
Month	Jan	Feb	Mar	Apr	May	Jun	Jul	Aug	Sep	Oct	Nov	Dec	Year
Record high °F (°C)	76 (24)	84 (29)	92 (33)	93 (34)	98 (37)	104 (40)	116 (47)	109 (43)	108 (42)	95 (35)	87 (31)	78 (26)	116 (47)
Mean daily maximum °F (°C)	42.8 (6.0)	48.3 (9.1)	57.5 (14.2)	67.5 (19.7)	75.8 (24.3)	84.7 (29.3)	89.5 (31.9)	89.0 (31.7)	81.4 (27.4)	70.2 (21.2)	57.2 (14.0)	46.4 (8.0)	67.5 (19.7)
Daily mean °F (°C)	32.5 (0.3)	37.0 (2.8)	46.0 (7.8)	55.6 (13.1)	64.9 (18.3)	74.1 (23.4)	78.7 (25.9)	77.5 (25.3)	69.4 (20.8)	58.0 (14.4)	46.0 (7.8)	36.4 (2.4)	56.3 (13.5)
Mean daily minimum °F (°C)	22.1 (−5.5)	25.8 (−3.4)	34.5 (1.4)	43.6 (6.4)	54.0 (12.2)	63.5 (17.5)	67.9 (19.9)	65.9 (18.8)	57.4 (14.1)	45.8 (7.7)	34.8 (1.6)	26.3 (−3.2)	45.1 (7.3)
Record low °F (°C)	−22 (−30)	−30 (−34)	−10 (−23)	17 (−8)	29 (−2)	42 (6)	47 (8)	45 (7)	23 (−5)	17 (−8)	1 (−17)	−17 (−27)	−30 (−34)
Average precipitation inches (mm)	2.20 (56)	2.19 (56)	3.60 (91)	5.10 (130)	6.24 (158)	5.44 (138)	4.47 (114)	3.72 (94)	4.66 (118)	3.63 (92)	3.36 (85)	2.64 (67)	47.25 (1,200)
Average snowfall inches (cm)	3.7 (9.4)	3.1 (7.9)	2.3 (5.8)	0.0 (0.0)	0.1 (0.25)	0.0 (0.0)	0.0 (0.0)	0.0 (0.0)	0.0 (0.0)	0.0 (0.0)	0.4 (1.0)	3.2 (8.1)	12.8 (33)
Average precipitation days (≥ 0.01 in)	7.5	7.6	10.3	10.8	12.2	11.2	9.0	8.0	7.6	8.8	8.5	7.5	109.0
Average snowy days (≥ 0.1 in)	2.5	2.1	0.9	0.1	0.1	0.0	0.0	0.0	0.0	0.0	0.4	1.6	7.7
Source: NOAA

== Demographics ==
Historical population
Census	Pop.	Note	%±
1890	633		—
1900	749		18.3%
1910	961		28.3%
1920	967		0.6%
1930	823		−14.9%
1940	841		2.2%
1950	791		−5.9%
1960	835		5.6%
1970	887		6.2%
1980	971		9.5%
1990	1,041		7.2%
2000	989		−5.0%
2010	936		−5.4%
2020	846		−9.6%
U.S. Decennial Census

=== 2010 census ===
As of the census of 2010, there were 936 people, 381 households, and 244 families living in the city. The population density was 964.9 inhabitants per square mile (372.5/km^{2}). There were 451 housing units at an average density of 464.9 per square mile (179.5/km^{2}). The racial makeup of the city was 96.6% White, 0.3% African American, 1.2% Native American, 0.7% Asian, and 1.2% from two or more races. Hispanic or Latino of any race were 1.3% of the population.

There were 381 households, of which 28.6% had children under the age of 18 living with them, 47.0% were married couples living together, 11.5% had a female householder with no husband present, 5.5% had a male householder with no wife present, and 36.0% were non-families. 34.6% of all households were made up of individuals, and 19.7% had someone living alone who was 65 years of age or older. The average household size was 2.32 and the average family size was 2.93.

The median age in the city was 43.9 years. 23.6% of residents were under the age of 18; 6.8% were between the ages of 18 and 24; 20.5% were from 25 to 44; 24.6% were from 45 to 64; and 24.6% were 65 years of age or older. The gender makeup of the city was 47.5% male and 52.5% female.

=== 2000 census ===
As of the census of 2000, there were 989 people, 409 households, and 283 families living in the city. The population density was 1,070.3 inhabitants per square mile (413.2/km^{2}). There were 468 housing units at an average density of 506.5 per square mile (195.6/km^{2}). The racial makeup of the city was 97.57% White, 1.01% Native American, 0.40% Asian, and 1.01% from two or more races. Hispanic or Latino of any race were 0.51% of the population.

There were 409 households, out of which 31.5% had children under the age of 18 living with them, 57.7% were married couples living together, 8.8% had a female householder with no husband present, and 30.8% were non-families. 29.8% of all households were made up of individuals, and 20.5% had someone living alone who was 65 years of age or older. The average household size was 2.42 and the average family size was 3.00.

In the city the population was spread out, with 24.5% under the age of 18, 8.5% from 18 to 24, 27.2% from 25 to 44, 17.2% from 45 to 64, and 22.6% who were 65 years of age or older. The median age was 39 years. For every 100 females, there were 84.9 males. For every 100 females age 18 and over, there were 79.1 males.

The median income for a household in the city was $26,125, and the median income for a family was $32,794. Males had a median income of $22,857 versus $19,583 for females. The per capita income for the city was $13,439. About 10.6% of families and 15.8% of the population were below the poverty line, including 19.7% of those under age 18 and 19.3% of those age 65 or over.

== Education ==
Public education in Lockwood is administered by Lockwood R-I School District.

Lockwood has a lending library, the Lockwood Public Library.
