= Cedarville, Missouri =

Unincorporated community in Missouri, U.S.

Cedarville
- unincorporated community
- Location within the state of Missouri Cedarville (the United States)
- Coordinates: 37°34′28″N 93°59′04″W
- Country: United States
- State: Missouri
- County: Dade
- Laid out: 1869
- Named for: Cedar Creek
- Time zone: UTC−6 (Central (CST))
  - Summer (DST): UTC−5 (CDT)

Cedarville is an unincorporated community in Dade County, in the U.S. state of Missouri.

== History ==
Cedarville was laid out in 1869. A post office called Cedarville was established in 1869, and remained in operation until 1909. The community takes its name from nearby Cedar Creek.
