= Jerico Springs, Missouri =

- Village
- Location of Jerico Springs, Missouri
- Coordinates: 37°37′15″N 94°00′41″W
- Country: United States
- State: Missouri
- County: Cedar

Area
  - Total: 0.68 sq mi (1.77 km^{2})
  - Land: 0.68 sq mi (1.77 km^{2})
  - Water: 0 sq mi (0.00 km^{2})
- Elevation: 968 ft (295 m)

Population (2020)
  - Total: 160
  - Density: 233.8/sq mi (90.28/km^{2})
- Time zone: UTC-6 (Central (CST))
  - Summer (DST): UTC-5 (CDT)
- ZIP code: 64756
- Area code: 417
- GNIS feature ID: 2398297

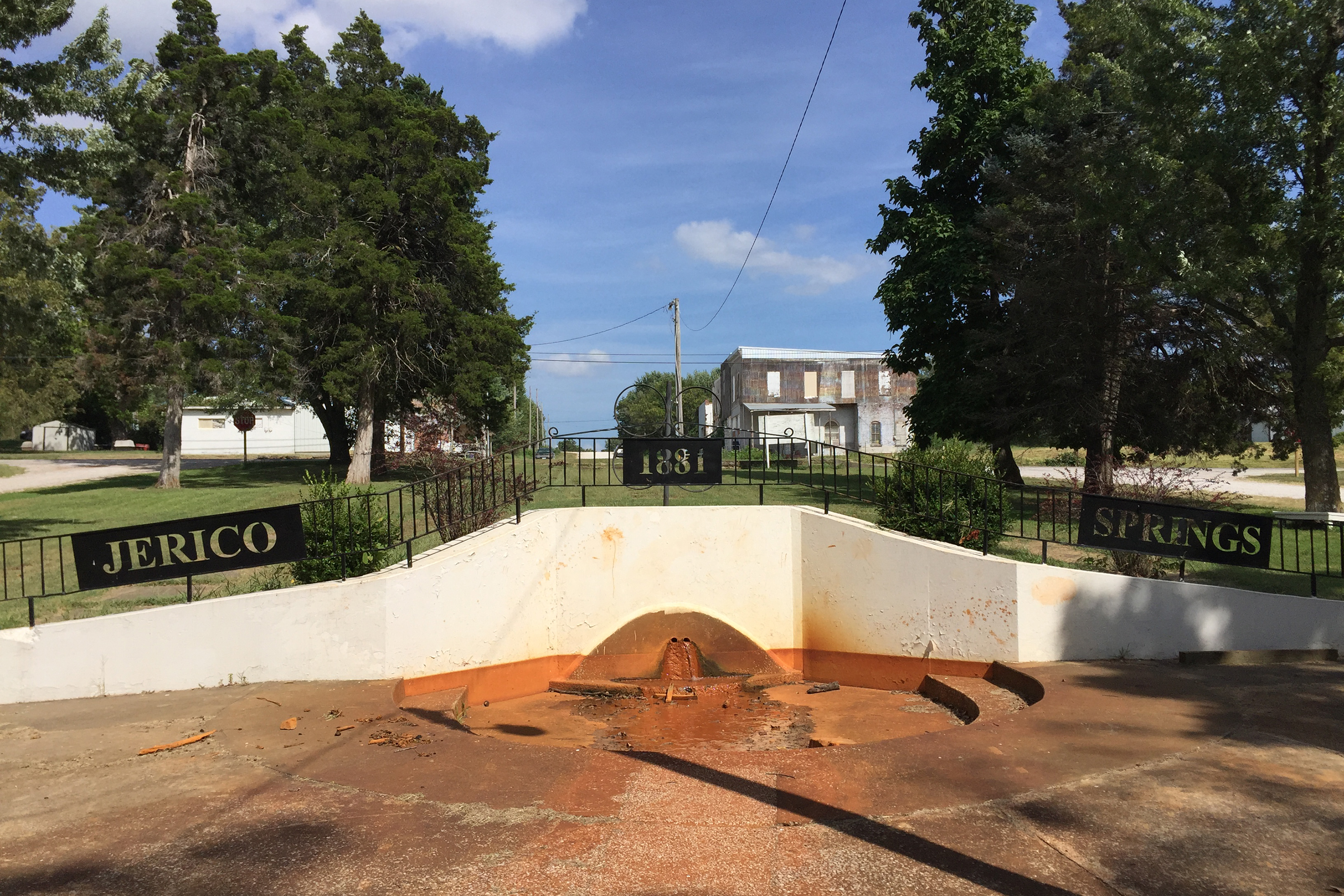
The spring in Jerico Springs, MO

Jerico Springs is a village in Cedar County, Missouri, United States. The population was 160 at the 2020 census.

== History ==
Jerico Springs was platted in 1882. Its name is derived from both the ancient city of Jericho and that of Joseph B. Carrico, the owner of the town site.

== Geography ==
Jerico Springs is located in the southwestern corner of Cedar County on Missouri Route 97. Stockton Lake lies approximately ten miles to the east of the town. The area is within the Springfield Plateau region of the Ozarks.

According to the United States Census Bureau, the village has a total area of 0.68 square miles (1.76 km^{2}), all land.

== Demographics ==
Historical population
Census	Pop.	Note	%±
1890	486		—
1900	443		−8.8%
1910	395		−10.8%
1920	262		−33.7%
1930	247		−5.7%
1940	254		2.8%
1950	235		−7.5%
1960	179		−23.8%
1970	188		5.0%
1980	208		10.6%
1990	247		18.8%
2000	259		4.9%
2010	228		−12.0%
2020	160		−29.8%
U.S. Decennial Census

=== 2010 census ===
As of the census of 2010, there were 228 people, 87 households, and 56 families residing in the village. The population density was 335.3 inhabitants per square mile (129.5/km^{2}). There were 124 housing units at an average density of 182.4 per square mile (70.4/km^{2}). The racial makeup of the village was 96.5% White and 3.5% from two or more races. Hispanic or Latino of any race were 2.2% of the population.

There were 87 households, of which 34.5% had children under the age of 18 living with them, 40.2% were married couples living together, 16.1% had a female householder with no husband present, 8.0% had a male householder with no wife present, and 35.6% were non-families. 28.7% of all households were made up of individuals, and 11.5% had someone living alone who was 65 years of age or older. The average household size was 2.62 and the average family size was 3.25.

The median age in the village was 36.5 years. 27.2% of residents were under the age of 18; 11% were between the ages of 18 and 24; 20.6% were from 25 to 44; 26.2% were from 45 to 64; and 14.9% were 65 years of age or older. The gender makeup of the village was 51.8% male and 48.2% female.

=== 2000 census ===
As of the census of 2000, there were 259 people, 104 households, and 74 families residing in the village. The population density was 384.0 inhabitants per square mile (148.3/km^{2}). There were 130 housing units at an average density of 192.8 per square mile (74.4/km^{2}). The racial makeup of the village was 97.30% White, 0.77% Native American, 0.39% Asian, and 1.54% from two or more races. Hispanic or Latino of any race were 0.39% of the population.

There were 104 households, out of which 34.6% had children under the age of 18 living with them, 58.7% were married couples living together, 8.7% had a female householder with no husband present, and 27.9% were non-families. 26.9% of all households were made up of individuals, and 12.5% had someone living alone who was 65 years of age or older. The average household size was 2.49 and the average family size was 2.96.

In the village, the population was spread out, with 29.0% under the age of 18, 5.4% from 18 to 24, 28.2% from 25 to 44, 21.2% from 45 to 64, and 16.2% who were 65 years of age or older. The median age was 36 years. For every 100 females, there were 100.8 males. For every 100 females age 18 and over, there were 97.8 males.

The median income for a household in the village was $22,188, and the median income for a family was $30,750. Males had a median income of $30,625 versus $13,750 for females. The per capita income for the village was $11,094. About 8.0% of families and 12.4% of the population were below the poverty line, including 3.3% of those under the age of 18 and 25.8% of those 65 or over.
