= South Greenfield, Missouri =

- Village
- Location of South Greenfield, Missouri
- Coordinates: 37°22′33″N 93°50′27″W
- Country: United States
- State: Missouri
- County: Dade

Area
  - Total: 0.18 sq mi (0.47 km^{2})
  - Land: 0.18 sq mi (0.47 km^{2})
  - Water: 0 sq mi (0.00 km^{2})
- Elevation: 961 ft (293 m)

Population (2020)
  - Total: 122
  - Density: 677.4/sq mi (261.56/km^{2})
- Time zone: UTC-6 (Central (CST))
  - Summer (DST): UTC-5 (CDT)
- ZIP code: 65752
- Area code: 417
- FIPS code: 29-68888
- GNIS feature ID: 2399848

South Greenfield is a village in Dade County, Missouri, United States. The population was 122 at the 2020 census.

== Geography ==
According to the United States Census Bureau, the village has a total area of 0.16 square miles (0.41 km^{2}), all land.

== Demographics ==
Historical population
Census	Pop.	Note	%±
1890	430		—
1900	297		−30.9%
1910	274		−7.7%
1920	258		−5.8%
1930	233		−9.7%
1940	210		−9.9%
1950	186		−11.4%
1960	179		−3.8%
1970	144		−19.6%
1980	110		−23.6%
1990	112		1.8%
2000	136		21.4%
2010	90		−33.8%
2020	122		35.6%
U.S. Decennial Census

=== 2010 census ===
As of the census of 2010, there were 90 people, 40 households, and 26 families residing in the village. The population density was 562.5 inhabitants per square mile (217.2/km^{2}). There were 46 housing units at an average density of 287.5 per square mile (111.0/km^{2}). The racial makeup of the village was 96.7% White and 3.3% Native American.

There were 40 households, of which 30.0% had children under the age of 18 living with them, 52.5% were married couples living together, 5.0% had a female householder with no husband present, 7.5% had a male householder with no wife present, and 35.0% were non-families. 30.0% of all households were made up of individuals, and 17.5% had someone living alone who was 65 years of age or older. The average household size was 2.25 and the average family size was 2.73.

The median age in the village was 41.5 years. 24.4% of residents were under the age of 18; 6.7% were between the ages of 18 and 24; 22.3% were from 25 to 44; 28.9% were from 45 to 64; and 17.8% were 65 years of age or older. The gender makeup of the village was 46.7% male and 53.3% female.

=== 2000 census ===
As of the census of 2000, there were 136 people, 54 households, and 40 families residing in the village. The population density was 798.1 inhabitants per square mile (308.1/km^{2}). There were 59 housing units at an average density of 346.3 per square mile (133.7/km^{2}). The racial makeup of the village was 99.26% White, and 0.74% from two or more races.

There were 54 households, out of which 38.9% had children under the age of 18 living with them, 61.1% were married couples living together, 7.4% had a female householder with no husband present, and 25.9% were non-families. 22.2% of all households were made up of individuals, and 7.4% had someone living alone who was 65 years of age or older. The average household size was 2.52 and the average family size was 2.90.

In the village, the population was spread out, with 29.4% under the age of 18, 8.8% from 18 to 24, 31.6% from 25 to 44, 19.9% from 45 to 64, and 10.3% who were 65 years of age or older. The median age was 32 years. For every 100 females, there were 100.0 males. For every 100 females age 18 and over, there were 104.3 males.

The median income for a household in the village was $19,000, and the median income for a family was $30,000. Males had a median income of $21,250 versus $13,125 for females. The per capita income for the village was $10,241. There were 28.1% of families and 30.0% of the population living below the poverty line, including 38.2% of under eighteens and 35.7% of those over 64.

== History ==
South Greenfield was originally called Watkins, and under the latter name was laid out in 1881 when the railroad was extended to that point. A post office called Watkins was established in 1881, and the name was changed to South Greenfield in 1891.

The Dilday Mill was formerly listed on the National Register of Historic Places.
