= Dade County, Missouri =

County in Missouri, United States

- County
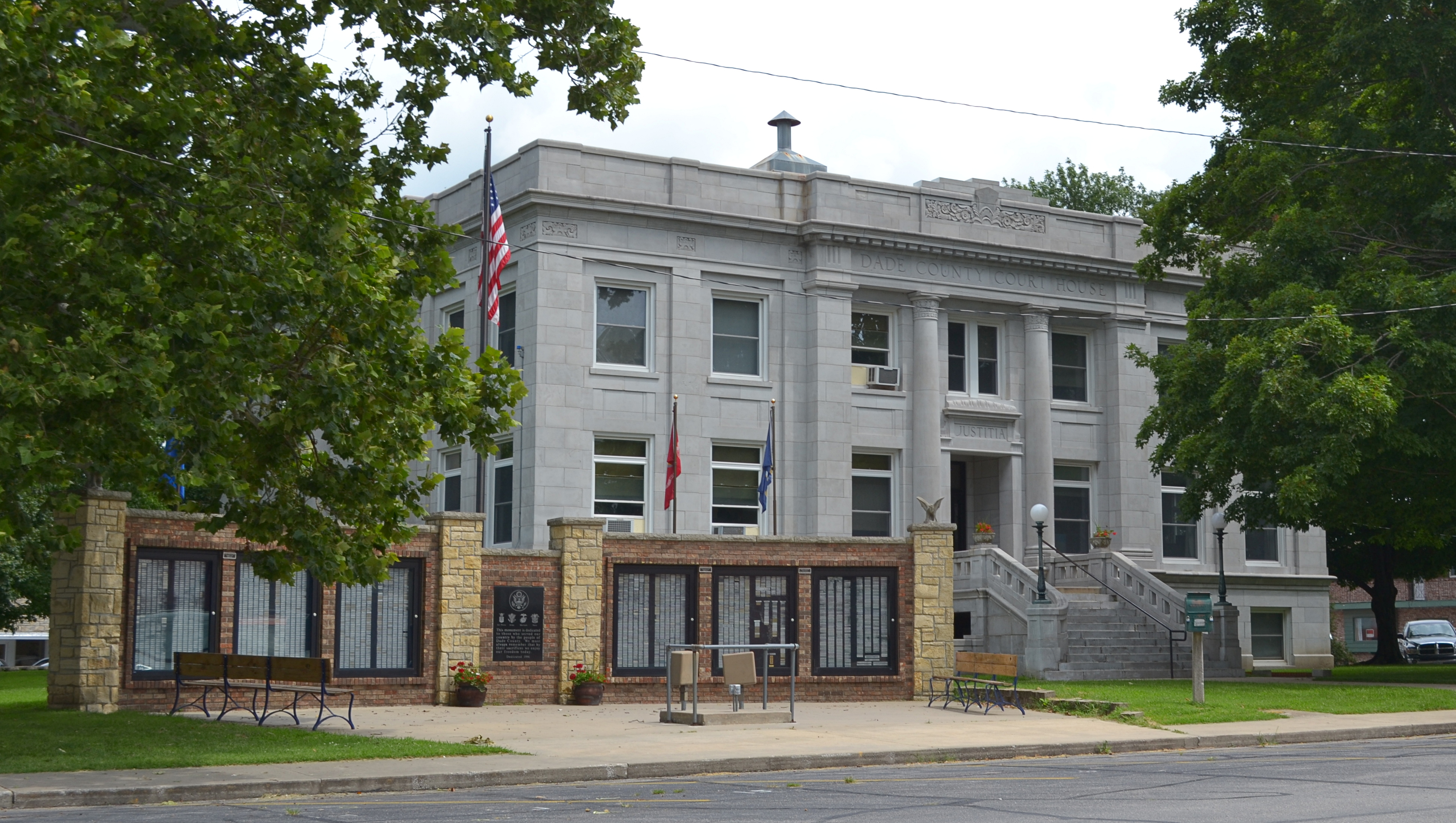
- Dade County Courthouse in Greenfield

- Location within the U.S. state of Missouri
- Coordinates: 37°26′N 93°51′W
- Country: United States
- State: Missouri
- Founded: January 29, 1841
- Named for: Francis L. Dade
- Seat: Greenfield
- Largest city: Greenfield

Area
  - Total: 506 sq mi (1,310 km^{2})
  - Land: 490 sq mi (1,300 km^{2})
  - Water: 16 sq mi (41 km^{2}) 3.2%

Population (2020)
  - Total: 7,569
  - Estimate (2025): 7,804 ▲
  - Density: 15.5/sq mi (6.0/km^{2})
- Time zone: UTC−6 (Central)
  - Summer (DST): UTC−5 (CDT)
- Congressional district: 4th
- Website: https://www.dadecountymo.gov/

Dade County is a county located in the southwest part of the U.S. state of Missouri. As of the 2020 census, the population was 7,569. Its county seat is Greenfield. The county was organized in 1841 and named after Major Francis L. Dade of Virginia, who was killed in the Second Seminole War in 1835.

== Geography ==
According to the U.S. Census Bureau, the county has a total area of 506 square miles (1,310 km^{2}), of which 490 square miles (1,300 km^{2}) is land and 16 square miles (41 km^{2}) (3.2%) is water.

=== Adjacent counties ===
- Cedar County (north)
- Polk County (northeast)
- Greene County (southeast)
- Lawrence County (south)
- Jasper County (southwest)
- Barton County (west)

=== Major highways ===
- U.S. Route 160
- Route 39
- Route 97

== Demographics ==
Historical population
Census	Pop.	Note	%±
1850	4,246		—
1860	7,072		66.6%
1870	8,086		14.3%
1880	12,557		55.3%
1890	17,528		39.6%
1900	18,125		3.4%
1910	15,613		−13.9%
1920	14,173		−9.2%
1930	11,764		−17.0%
1940	11,248		−4.4%
1950	9,324		−17.1%
1960	7,577		−18.7%
1970	6,850		−9.6%
1980	7,383		7.8%
1990	7,449		0.9%
2000	7,923		6.4%
2010	7,883		−0.5%
2020	7,569		−4.0%
2025 (est.)	7,804	▲	3.1%
U.S. Decennial Census; 1790-1960 1900-1990; 1990-2000 2010-2015

=== Racial and ethnic composition ===
Dade County, Missouri – Racial and ethnic composition Note: the US Census treats Hispanic/Latino as an ethnic category. This table excludes Latinos from the racial categories and assigns them to a separate category. Hispanics/Latinos may be of any race.
Race / Ethnicity (NH = Non-Hispanic)	Pop 1980	Pop 1990	Pop 2000	Pop 2010	Pop 2020	% 1980	% 1990	% 2000	% 2010	% 2020
White alone (NH)	7,289	7,279	7,670	7,476	6,995	98.73%	97.72%	96.81%	94.84%	92.42%
Black or African American alone (NH)	15	20	21	29	34	0.20%	0.27%	0.27%	0.37%	0.45%
Native American or Alaska Native alone (NH)	32	62	56	70	50	0.43%	0.83%	0.71%	0.89%	0.66%
Asian alone (NH)	6	12	11	22	24	0.08%	0.16%	0.14%	0.28%	0.32%
Native Hawaiian or Pacific Islander alone (NH)	x	x	4	3	0	x	x	0.05%	0.04%	0.00%
Other race alone (NH)	9	0	2	2	0	0.12%	0.00%	0.03%	0.03%	0.00%
Mixed race or Multiracial (NH)	x	x	92	160	331	x	x	1.16%	2.03%	4.37%
Hispanic or Latino (any race)	32	76	67	121	135	0.43%	1.02%	0.85%	1.53%	1.78%
Total	7,383	7,449	7,923	7,883	7,569	100.00%	100.00%	100.00%	100.00%	100.00%

=== 2020 census ===
As of the 2020 census, the county had a population of 7,569 people and 3,775 housing units.

The median age was 47.5 years. 21.3% of residents were under the age of 18 and 25.1% of residents were 65 years of age or older. For every 100 females there were 103.4 males, and for every 100 females age 18 and over there were 99.0 males age 18 and over.

There were 3,105 households in the county, of which 26.3% had children under the age of 18 living with them and 21.2% had a female householder with no spouse or partner present. About 28.6% of all households were made up of individuals and 14.7% had someone living alone who was 65 years of age or older.

There were 3,775 housing units, of which 17.7% were vacant. Among occupied housing units, 77.7% were owner-occupied and 22.3% were renter-occupied. The homeowner vacancy rate was 2.6% and the rental vacancy rate was 8.5%.

0.0% of residents lived in urban areas, while 100.0% lived in rural areas.

The racial makeup of the county was 92.4% White, 0.5% Black or African American, 0.6% Native American, 0.3% Asian, 0.0% Native Hawaiian and Pacific Islander, 0.5% from some other race, and 4.4% from two or more races. Hispanic or Latino residents of any race comprised 1.8% of the population.

=== Income and poverty ===
The median income for a household in the county was $49,899, and the median income for a family was $53,409. Males had a median income of $40,909 versus $28,750 for females. The per capita income for the county was $26,774. About 8.8% of families and 11.7% of the population were below the poverty line, including 15.4% of those under age 18 and 11.2% of those age 65 or over.

== Education ==
=== Public schools ===
- Dadeville R-II School District – Dadeville
  - Dadeville Elementary School (K-06)
  - Dadeville High School (07-12)
- Everton R-III School District – Everton
  - Everton Elementary School (K-05)
  - Everton Middle School (06-08)
  - Everton High School (09-12)
- Greenfield R-IV School District – Greenfield
  - Greenfield Elementary School (PK-06)
  - Greenfield High School (07-12)
- Lockwood R-I School District – Lockwood
  - Lockwood Elementary School (PK-08)
  - Lockwood High School (09-12)

=== Private schools ===
- Immanuel Lutheran School – Lockwood (PK-08) – Lutheran
- Faith Fellowship Christian Academy – Greenfield (PK-10) - Baptist

=== Public libraries ===
- Dade County Library
- Lockwood Public Library

== Communities ==
=== Cities and towns ===
- Arcola
- Dadeville
- Everton
- Greenfield (county seat)
- Lockwood
- South Greenfield

=== Unincorporated communities ===
- Bona
- Cedarville
- Comet
- Corry
- Dudenville
- Kings Point
- Meinert
- Pennsboro
- Sylvania

=== Townships ===
- Cedar
- Center
- Ernest
- Grant
- Lockwood
- Marion
- North
- North Morgan
- Pilgrim
- Polk
- Rock Prairie
- Sac
- Smith
- South
- South Morgan
- Washington

== Politics ==
=== Local ===
The Republican Party predominantly controls politics at the local level in Dade County. Republicans hold all but one of the elected positions in the county.

Dade County, Missouri

Elected countywide officials
Assessor	Annette Black	Republican
Circuit Clerk	Mary McGee	Republican
County Clerk	Melinda Wright	Republican
Collector	Jarromy O’Connor	Republican
Commissioner (presiding)	Randy Daniel	Republican
Commissioner (district 1)	William G. Marshall	Republican
Commissioner (district 2)	David Rusch	Republican
Coroner	Gary Banta	Independent
Prosecuting Attorney	Marcy Greenwade	Republican
Public Administrator	Pat Killingsworth	Republican
Recorder	Carolyn Kile	Republican
Sheriff	Ryan Robinson	Republican
Surveyor	Justin Hunt	Republican
Treasurer	Susan Crouch	Independent

=== State ===
Past Gubernatorial Elections Results
Year	Republican	Democratic	Third Parties
2024	81.26% 3,360	16.90% 699	1.84% 76
2020	81.56% 3,348	16.27% 668	2.17% 89
2016	68.93% 2,720	28.18% 1,112	2.89% 114
2012	57.59% 2,237	40.09% 1,557	2.32% 90
2008	50.22% 2,049	46.05% 1,879	3.72% 152
2004	72.03% 2,938	27.02% 1,102	0.96% 39
2000	62.43% 2,306	36.19% 1,337	1.39% 51
1996	56.10% 1,954	40.88% 1,424	3.01% 105

All of Dade County is a part of Missouri's 127th District in the Missouri House of Representatives and is represented by Ann Kelley (R-Lamar).

Missouri House of Representatives — District 127 — Dade County (2016)
Party	Candidate	Votes	%	±%
Republican	Mike Kelley	3,299	85.47%	−14.53
Independent	George R. Parsons	561	14.53%	+14.53

Missouri House of Representatives — District 127 — Dade County (2014)
Party	Candidate	Votes	%	±%
Republican	Mike Kelley	1,886	100.00%	

Missouri House of Representatives — District 127 — Dade County (2012)
Party	Candidate	Votes	%	±%
Republican	Mike Kelley	3,389	100.00%	

All of Dade County is a part of Missouri's 32nd District in the Missouri Senate and is currently represented by Ron Richard (R-Joplin).

Missouri Senate — District 32 — Dade County (2014)
Party	Candidate	Votes	%	±%
Republican	Ron Richard	1,799	100.00%	

=== Federal ===
U.S. Senate — Missouri — Dade County (2016)
Party	Candidate	Votes	%	±%
Republican	Roy Blunt	2,810	71.23%	+16.04
Democratic	Jason Kander	969	24.56%	−13.61
Libertarian	Jonathan Dine	82	2.08%	−4.56
Green	Johnathan McFarland	33	0.84%	+0.84
Constitution	Fred Ryman	51	1.29%	+1.29

U.S. Senate — Missouri — Dade County (2012)
Party	Candidate	Votes	%	±%
Republican	Todd Akin	2,128	55.19%	
Democratic	Claire McCaskill	1,472	38.17%	
Libertarian	Jonathan Dine	256	6.64%	

All of Dade County is included in Missouri's 4th Congressional District and is currently represented by Vicky Hartzler (R-Harrisonville) in the U.S. House of Representatives.

U.S. House of Representatives — Missouri's 4th Congressional District — Dade County (2016)
Party	Candidate	Votes	%	±%
Republican	Vicky Hartzler	3,121	80.25%	−0.05
Democratic	Gordon Christensen	612	15.74%	+0.48
Libertarian	Mark Bliss	156	4.01%	−0.43

U.S. House of Representatives — Missouri's 4th Congressional District — Dade County (2014)
Party	Candidate	Votes	%	±%
Republican	Vicky Hartzler	1,773	80.30%	+3.38
Democratic	Nate Irvin	337	15.26%	−5.40
Libertarian	Herschel L. Young	98	4.44%	+2.72

U.S. House of Representatives — Missouri’s 4th Congressional District — Dade County (2012)
Party	Candidate	Votes	%	±%
Republican	Vicky Hartzler	2,956	76.92%	
Democratic	Teresa Hensley	794	20.66%	
Libertarian	Thomas Holbrook	66	1.72%	
Constitution	Greg Cowan	27	0.70%	

==== Political Culture ====
United States presidential election results for Dade County, Missouri
Year	Republican		Democratic		Third party(ies)	
Year	No.	%	No.	%	No.	%
1888	1,740	49.31%	1,479	41.91%	310	8.78%
1892	1,420	40.75%	1,101	31.59%	964	27.66%
1896	1,797	43.00%	2,363	56.54%	19	0.45%
1900	1,992	50.57%	1,821	46.23%	126	3.20%
1904	1,994	56.09%	1,376	38.71%	185	5.20%
1908	1,946	56.05%	1,441	41.50%	85	2.45%
1912	1,196	35.35%	1,313	38.81%	874	25.84%
1916	1,941	53.38%	1,618	44.50%	77	2.12%
1920	3,520	63.92%	1,892	34.36%	95	1.73%
1924	2,651	54.66%	2,007	41.38%	192	3.96%
1928	3,497	70.55%	1,453	29.31%	7	0.14%
1932	2,340	44.76%	2,833	54.19%	55	1.05%
1936	3,326	58.67%	2,312	40.78%	31	0.55%
1940	3,910	67.87%	1,835	31.85%	16	0.28%
1944	3,316	69.29%	1,462	30.55%	8	0.17%
1948	2,783	61.56%	1,733	38.33%	5	0.11%
1952	3,395	71.52%	1,340	28.23%	12	0.25%
1956	2,641	64.10%	1,479	35.90%	0	0.00%
1960	2,987	71.05%	1,217	28.95%	0	0.00%
1964	1,931	54.06%	1,641	45.94%	0	0.00%
1968	2,250	64.34%	917	26.22%	330	9.44%
1972	2,624	77.84%	747	22.16%	0	0.00%
1976	2,015	54.31%	1,681	45.31%	14	0.38%
1980	2,410	63.79%	1,283	33.96%	85	2.25%
1984	2,600	70.27%	1,100	29.73%	0	0.00%
1988	2,154	61.97%	1,315	37.83%	7	0.20%
1992	1,577	42.04%	1,332	35.51%	842	22.45%
1996	1,822	51.40%	1,243	35.06%	480	13.54%
2000	2,468	65.78%	1,193	31.80%	91	2.43%
2004	2,963	72.46%	1,104	27.00%	22	0.54%
2008	2,864	69.65%	1,184	28.79%	64	1.56%
2012	2,895	74.31%	939	24.10%	62	1.59%
2016	3,184	80.59%	637	16.12%	130	3.29%
2020	3,414	82.88%	656	15.93%	49	1.19%
2024	3,480	83.13%	671	16.03%	35	0.84%

=== Missouri presidential preference primary (2008) ===
Former Governor Mike Huckabee (R-Arkansas) received more votes, a total of 769, than any candidate from either party in Dade County during the 2008 presidential primary. He fell just 25 votes short from receiving the same number of votes cast in the entire Democratic primary in Dade County.

== See also ==
- National Register of Historic Places listings in Dade County, Missouri
