= Box Township, Cedar County, Missouri =

Inactive township in the US state of Missouri

Coordinates: 37.8244746°N 93.9944099°W

Box Township is an inactive township in Cedar County, in the U.S. state of Missouri.

Box Township was established in the 1850s, and named after one Mr. Box, a pioneer settler.

The streams of Alder Creek, Aves Creek, Baker Creek, Cherry Branch, Clear Creek, Fly Creek, Horse Creek, McCord Branch, Walnut Creek, among others, run through this township.
