= Olympia, Missouri =

Unincorporated community in Cedar County

Coordinates: 37°43′34″N 94°01′43″W

Olympia is an unincorporated community in Cedar County, in the U.S. state of Missouri. The community is on Missouri Route 97 at the intersection with county routes E and CC approximately nine miles south of El Dorado Springs. Horse Creek flows past about one mile to the east.

== History ==
A post office called Olympia was established in 1899, and closed in 1907. An earlier variant name of the community was Hyattsville, after Mr. Hyatt, a local merchant.

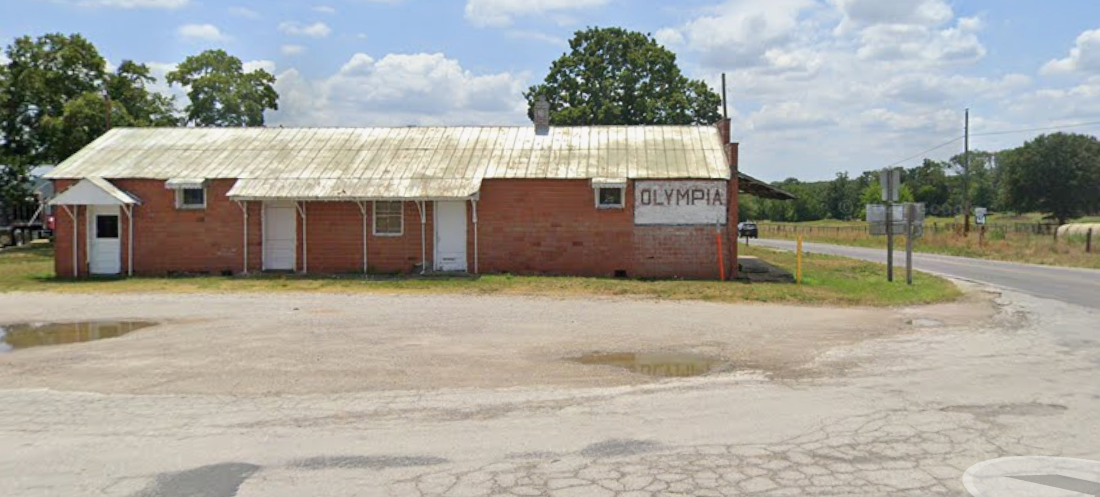

The only thing remaining of Olympia is one homestead and a building with the word Olympia painted on it. A small market called Sunnyside market is located just south of Olympia

== Location ==
Located South of El Dorado Springs. From the junction of US route 52 and Missouri highway 32, drive south on highway 32 for about 6.2 miles until the junction with Missouri route 97, here turn to route 97 and continue for 3.6 miles where Olympia is located.

Coordinates for this community are: 37.726126, -94.028540
