= Zodiac (disambiguation) =

The zodiac is a coordinate system of twelve "signs", based on twelve constellations used in astronomy and astrology.

Zodiac may also refer to:

== Amusement park rides ==
- Zodiac (ride), a ride at Thorpe Park, United Kingdom
- Zodiac, a double Ferris wheel

== Film ==
- Zodiac-films, a 1970s series of Danish erotic films
- The Zodiac Killer (film), 1971 film about the Zodiac Killer, released while the serial murderer was still actively sending letters
- Zodiac Rapist (1971), a pornographic horror film loosely based on the crimes of the Zodiac Killer
- The Zodiac (film), a 2005 film by Alexander Buckley about the Zodiac Killer
- Curse of the Zodiac (2007) horror film, a loose retelling of the original murders
- Zodiac (film), a 2007 film by David Fincher based on a book about the Zodiac Killer
- Zodiac: Signs of the Apocalypse, a 2014 Canadian science fiction disaster television film
- Awakening the Zodiac (2017), a mystery drama about the Zodiac Killer
- Zodiac (TV series), an upcoming TV series in the Marvel Cinematic Universe

== Literature ==
- Zodiac (true crime book), a 1986 book by Robert Graysmith about the Zodiac Killer
- Zodiac (novel), a 1988 novel by Neal Stephenson about environmentalism
- Short Trips: Zodiac (2002), an anthology about Doctor Who
- Zodiac (comics), several groups of supervillains in the Marvel Universe
- Zodiac (character), an alias used by several characters in the Marvel Universe
- Zodiacs (Hunter × Hunter), a group of characters in the manga series Hunter × Hunter

== Music ==
=== Artists ===
- Zodiac (German band), a German hard/blues rock band
- Zodiac (Latvian band), a Soviet, then Latvian musical group
- Maurice Williams and the Zodiacs, an American vocal group

=== Albums ===
- Zodiac (Cecil Payne album)
- Zodiac (Electric Six album) (2010)
- Zodiac (soundtrack), the soundtrack from the 2007 film
- The Zodiac: Cosmic Sounds, a 1967 psychedelic concept album
- Zodiac, a 2024 album by Hakos Baelz

=== Songs ===
- "Zodiac", a song by Yaron Chadad representing Israel in the Eurovision Song Contest 1992
- "Zodiac", a 1999 song by Richie Havens from Time
- "Zodiac", a song by Ryan Leslie
- "The Zodiac", a song by Kamelot
- "Zodiacs", a song by Roberta Kelly
- "Zodiac", a song by Melvins
- "Zodiac", a song by God Is an Astronaut from their self-titled album
- "Zodiac", a song by Macabre from their album Sinister Slaughter

=== Music venues and labels ===
- The Zodiac, a former name of the O2 Academy Oxford, a nightclub and music venue in Oxford, England
- Zodiac Club, a defunct music venue in Allentown, Pennsylvania
- Zodiac Records (New Zealand), a record label
- Zodiac Records, a list of record labels
- Zodiak Free Arts Lab, an experimental music venue in West Berlin

== Organizations ==
- Orange County Zodiac, a former American soccer team
- Zodiac Aerospace, a former corporation specializing in the production of aerosafety systems, part of Safran
- Zodiac Clothing Company Ltd., an Indian clothing manufacturer and retailer
- Zodiac Entertainment, an American television production/distribution company
- Zodiac Nautic, a corporation specializing in the production of Zodiac rigid inflatable boats
- Zodiac Milpro, a company producing rigid inflatable boats for military and professional clients
- Zodiac Watches, a brand of watches

== Places ==
- Zodiac, a climbing route on the El Capitan rock formation in Yosemite Valley
- Zodiac, Missouri
- Zodiac Springs, a spring in Missouri
- Zodiac, Texas

== Transport ==
- AMD Zodiac, a light sport aircraft
- Zephyr Zodiac, the luxury variant of the Ford Zephyr line of cars
- Zodiac inflatable boat
- Zodiac (schooner), a historic schooner homeported in Seattle, Washington, USA

== Other uses ==
- The Zodiac Killer, an unidentified serial killer in the San Francisco area, California
- Heriberto Seda, a serial killer known as the "New York Zodiac Killer"
- Brutus Beefcake or "the Zodiac", American retired professional wrestler
- Tapwave Zodiac, a palmtop computer
- Zodiac (cipher), a Korean encryption algorithm
- Zodiac: Orcanon Odyssey, a video game

== See also ==
- Tierkreis (Stockhausen) ("Zodiac" in German), a composition for 12 music boxes by Karlheinz Stockhausen
- Zodac, a character in the He-man and Masters of the Universe mythology
