= Filley, Missouri =

Unincorporated community in Missouri, U.S.

Coordinates: 37°45′32″N 93°56′57″W

Filley is an unincorporated community in Cedar County, in the U.S. state of Missouri.

== History ==
A post office called Filley was established in 1882, and remained in operation until 1919. The community has the name of Chauncey Ives Filley, a state legislator.

The only things remaining of Filley are a boutique carrying its name, a meat market, a small restaurant and three or four homesteads.

== Location ==
Located south southeast of El Dorado Springs and west northwest of Stockton. From the Stockton square turn west on Missouri highway 32. Continue on this road for about 10.8 miles. You will pass the junction with highway K and immediately after that you will arrive at Filley. You could also drive south from the US route 52, and Missouri highway 32 junction in El Dorado Springs, following highway 32 for 10.2 miles where Filley is located.

Coordinates for this community are: 37.759070, -93.947234
