= Lebeck, Missouri =

Unincorporated community in Missouri, U.S.

Coordinates: 37°53′23″N 93°54′48″W

Lebeck is an unincorporated community in Cedar County, in the U.S. state of Missouri.

== History ==
A post office called Lebeck was established in 1871, and remained in operation until 1907. The community has the name of the local Lebeck family.

== Location ==
Located northwest of El Dorado Springs. Drive 6.57 miles west on US highway 54, until you come to Missouri route DD. Turn left and you will go through 5 curves. After 2.2 miles, on the 6th curve, 60 Rd splits off of route DD. Lebeck is located at this junction.

Coordinates for this community are: 37.889530, -93.913349
