= Fly Creek =

Fly Creek may refer to:

== Streams ==
- Fly Creek (Clear Creek tributary), a stream in Missouri
- Fly Creek (Sacandaga River tributary), a stream in Hamilton County, New York
- Fly Creek (Schoharie Creek tributary), a stream in Montgomery and Schoharie counties, New York
- Fly Creek (Oaks Creek tributary), a stream in Otsego County, New York
- Fly Creek (Oquaga Creek tributary), a stream in Broome County, New York

== Settlements ==
- Fly Creek, New York, a hamlet in New York
- Fly Creek, Northern Territory, a community in Australia
