= Cane Hill, Missouri =

Unincorporated community in Missouri, U.S.

Coordinates: 37°34′44″N 93°43′54″W

Cane Hill is an unincorporated community in Cedar County, in the U.S. state of Missouri.

== History ==
A post office called Cane Hill was established in 1858, and remained in operation until 1918. The community was named for the canebrake harvested near the town site.

What is remaining of Cane Hill are about 15 homes with residents inside the community.

== Location ==
Located south southeast of Stockton MO. From Stockton square, drive approximately 3.5 miles south on Missouri highway 39. At this point you will reach a junction with Missouri route 215. Once turned left onto route 215, the "mile-long bridge," as locals call it, will cross over Stockton Lake around 3.5 miles after the junction. Another 5.6 miles later you will come across a small cluster of buildings. This is where Cane Hill is located.

Coordinates for this community are: 37.578930, -93.731787
