= Caplinger Mills, Missouri =

Unincorporated community in Missouri, U.S.

Coordinates: 37°47′39″N 93°48′16″W

Caplinger Mills is an unincorporated community in northern Cedar County, Missouri, United States. Several homes are located in the community, along with an old mill. It is on the Sac River.

Caplinger Mills was settled in 1849. The community was named for Samuel Caplinger, the proprietor of a local mill.

The Caplinger Mills Historic District was listed on the National Register of Historic Places in 1993.

What remains of Caplinger Mills are several businesses a bridge and a cemetery, as well as a large group of houses.

== Location ==
Located north of Stockton. From the Stockton square drive east on highway 32 for 1.2 miles until the highway 39 junction. Turn off on north highway 39 and drive for approximately 6.6 miles turn east on highway N for 1.4 miles. the junction with spur N is at this point. After turning on Spur N it will take you directly to where Caplinger Mills is located.

Coordinates for this community are: 37.794525, -93.804716

== Notable person ==
- Kate Austin, radical writer and anarchist
