= Rowland, Missouri =

Unincorporated community in Missouri

Coordinates: 37°35′55″N 93°48′58″W

Rowland is an unincorporated community in Cedar County, in the U.S. state of Missouri.

== History ==
A post office called Rowland was established in 1898, and remained in operation until 1906. The community has the name of R. P. Rowland, the original owner of the town site.

The only things remaining of Rowland are 3 homesteads.

== Location ==
Located South of Stockton. From the Stockton square head south on Missouri highway 39 for 7.3 miles where Missouri highway H intersects highway 32. Turn east here and drive for 2.1 miles. Turn south on 1425 Rd and after 1 mile, this is where Rowland is located.

Coordinates for this community are: 37.596181, -93.816635
