= Stockton Community Building =

- U.S. National Register of Historic Places
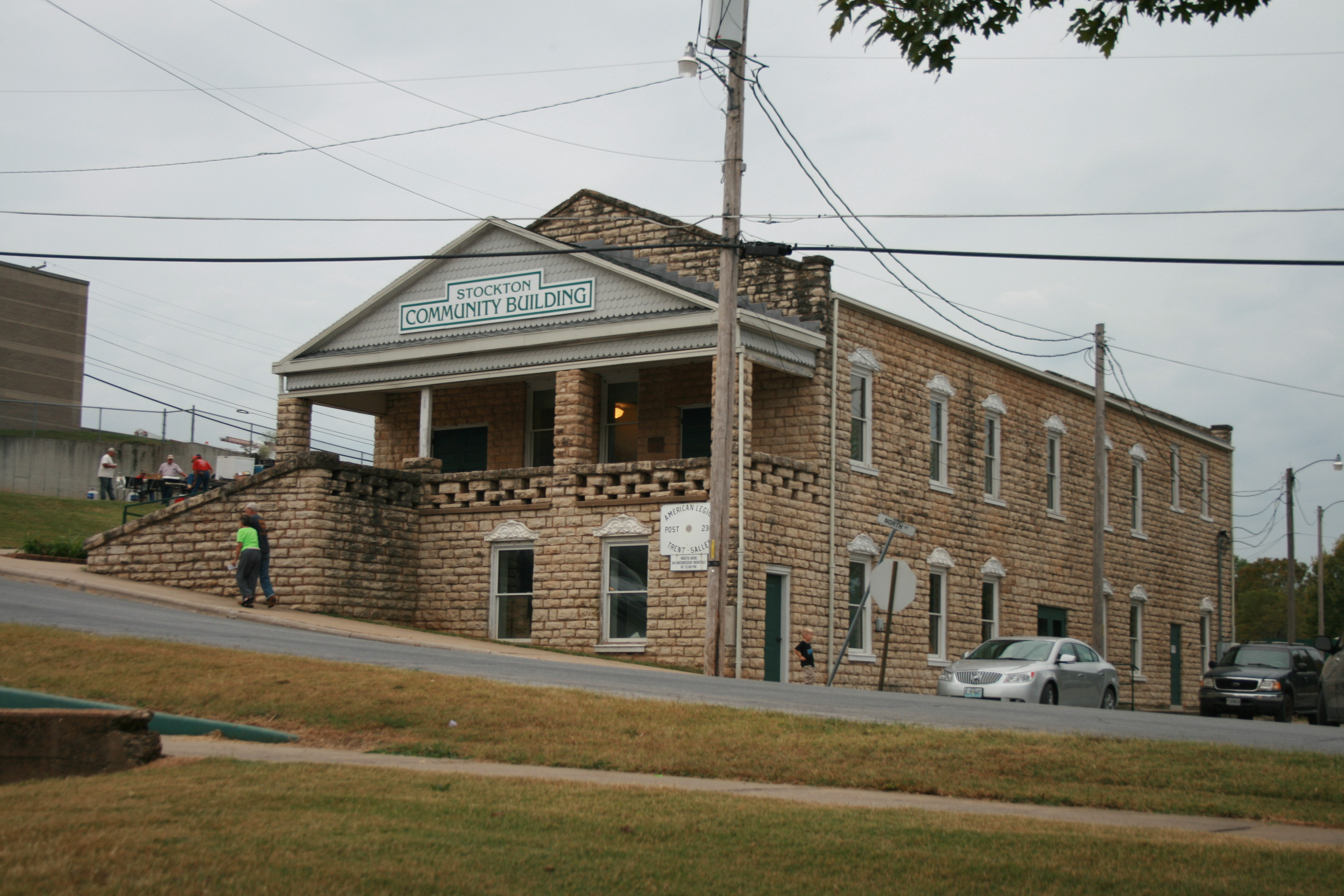

- Location within Missouri Location within the United States
- Location: Jct. of Spring and North Sts., Stockton, Missouri
- Coordinates: 37°42′0″N 93°47′46″W
- Area: less than one acre
- Built: 1933-1934
- Architect: Kelly, Walter
- Architectural style: WPA stone building
- NRHP reference No.: 98001502
- Added to NRHP: December 10, 1998

Stockton Community Building, also known as the Trent-Sallee American Legion Post #230, is a historic community centre located at Stockton, Cedar County, Missouri. It was built in 1933-1934 through a grant from the Civil Works Administration. It is a two-story, rectangular building constructed of native limestone in a plain ashlar design.

It was listed on the National Register of Historic Places in 1998.
