= Arnica, Missouri =

Unincorporated community in Missouri, U.S.

Coordinates: 37°45′06″N 93°42′31″W

Arnica is an unincorporated community in Cedar County, in the U.S. state of Missouri.

== History ==
A post office called Arnica was established in 1883, and remained in operation until 1907. The community took its name from a nearby spring where arnica grew.

In 1925, Arnica had 110 inhabitants.

The only thing remaining of Arnica is a circular driveway, and a cluster of buildings at 19925 E. 950 Rd.

== Location ==
Located northeast of Stockton. Drive 2.6 miles east on Missouri highway 32, until you come to Missouri route M. Turn left and you will drive 2.9 miles. This is where the junction with Missouri route AA is located. After turning onto this road, go 2.4 miles, and you will reach a curve where 950 Rd meets AA. After going approximately 275 yards, there is a circular driveway where Arnica is located.

Coordinates for this community are: 37.889530, -93.913349
