= Bearcreek, Missouri =

Unincorporated community in Missouri, US

Coordinates: 37°39′26″N 93°39′30″W

Bearcreek is an unincorporated community in Cedar County, in the U.S. state of Missouri.

== History ==
A post office called Bear Creek was established in 1847, the name was changed to Bearcreek in 1894, and the post office closed in 1957. The community took its name from nearby Bear Creek.

The things remaining of Bearcreek are, four homes and land owned by those homes.

== Location ==
Located southeast of Stockton. Drive 9.2 miles east on Missouri highway 32, until you come to 1620 Rd. Turn onto this road and you will drive roughly 375 yards, before reaching Bearcreek.

Coordinates for this community are: 37.65858642, -93.65474244
