= Caplinger Mills Historic District =

Historic district in Missouri, United States

- U.S. National Register of Historic Places
- U.S. Historic district
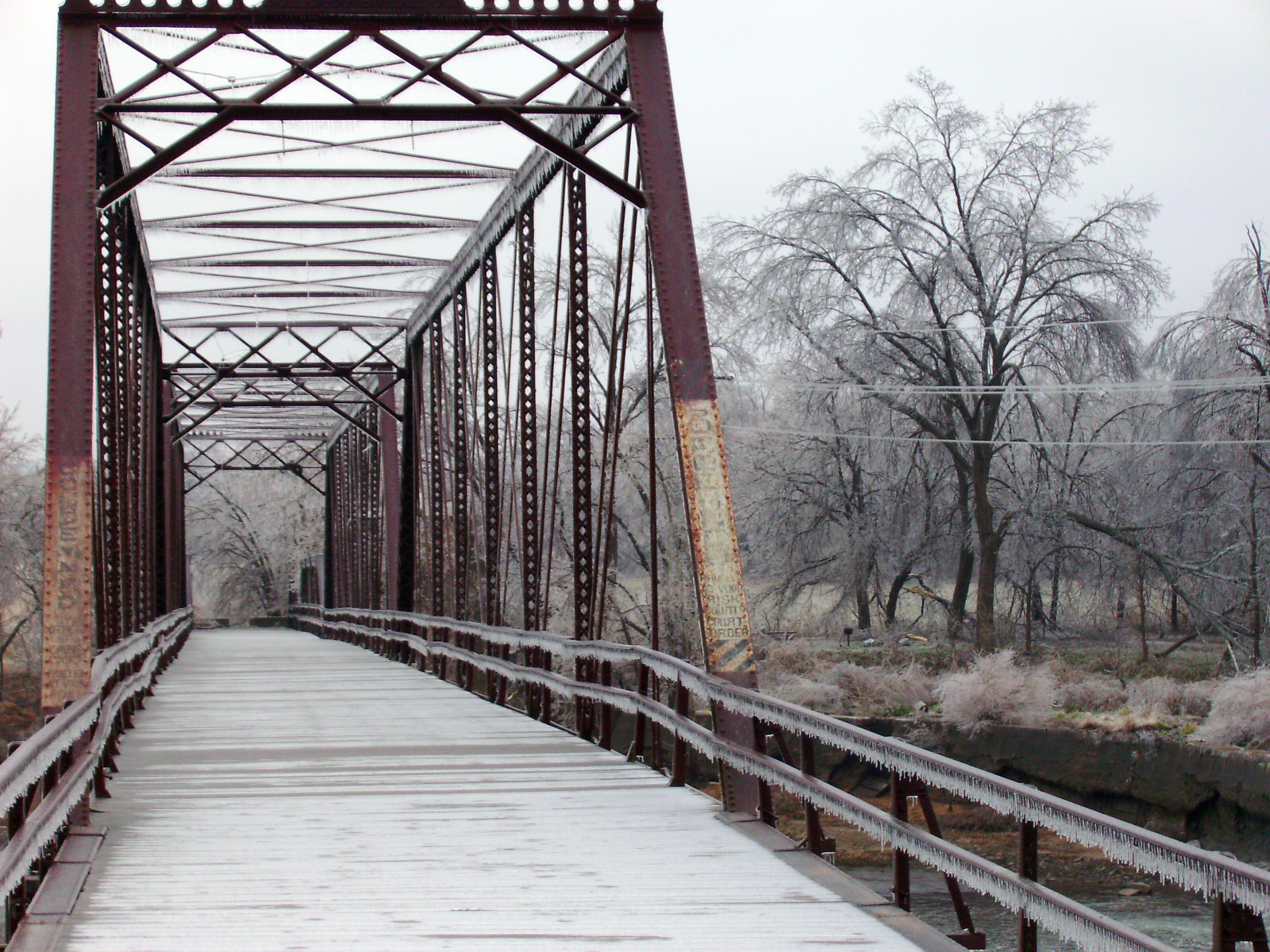
- Caplinger Mills Bridge, December 2007

- Location within Missouri Location within the United States
- Location: Jct. of Washington Ave. and the Sac R., Caplinger Mills, Missouri
- Coordinates: 37°47′51″N 93°48′21″W
- Area: 1.5 acres (0.61 ha)
- Built: 1895
- Built by: Chicago Bridge Co.
- NRHP reference No.: 93000903
- Added to NRHP: September 2, 1993

Caplinger Mills Historic District is a national historic district located at Caplinger Mills, Cedar County, Missouri. The district includes one contributing site and three contributing structures related to the development and use of water power in Cedar County. It developed between about 1895 and 1943, and includes a grist mill site, dam, power house and double span Pratt with two pony truss approach spans bridge (1895).

It was listed on the National Register of Historic Places in 1993.
