= Needmore =

Needmore can refer to:

- Needmore, Arkansas
- Needmore, Brantley County, Georgia, along Georgia State Route 32
- Needmore, Echols County, Georgia
- Needmore, Brown County, Indiana
- Needmore, Lawrence County, Indiana
- Needmore, Vermillion County, Indiana
- Needmore, Ballard County, Kentucky
- Needmore, Owen County, Kentucky
- Needmore, Missouri
- Needmore, Pennsylvania
- Needmore, Bailey County, Texas
- Needmore, Terry County, Texas
- Needmore, Virginia
- Needmore, Barbour County, West Virginia, former name of Adaland, West Virginia
- Needmore, Hardy County, West Virginia
- Needmore, the Virginia home of William Overton Callis
