= Wilkey Creek =

Stream in the American state of Missouri

Wilkey Creek is a stream in Cedar and Vernon Counties in the U.S. state of Missouri. It is a tributary of Horse Creek.

The stream headwaters arise south of Montevallo in Vernon County at 37°42′37″N 94°05′04″W and flows southeast into Cedar County to its confluence with Horse Creek northwest of Jerico Springs at 37°40′29″N 94°03′17″W.

Wilkey Creek has the name of one Mr. Wilkey, a pioneer citizen.

== See also ==
- List of rivers of Missouri
