= Pacetown, Missouri =

Unincorporated community in Missouri, U.S.

Coordinates: 37°45′12″N 93°59′44″W

Pacetown is an unincorporated community in Cedar County, in the U.S. state of Missouri.

The community derives its name from Ike Pace, a local merchant.

The only thing remaining of Pacetown is 1 homestead at the intersection.

== Location ==
Located south of El Dorado Springs. From the junction of US route 54, and Missouri highway 32, drive south on Highway 32 for 7.6 miles then turn south on 421 Rd. 1 mile down this road is where Pacetown is located.

Coordinates for this community are: 37.753340, -93.995216
