= 1876 United States presidential election in Missouri =

- November 7, 1876
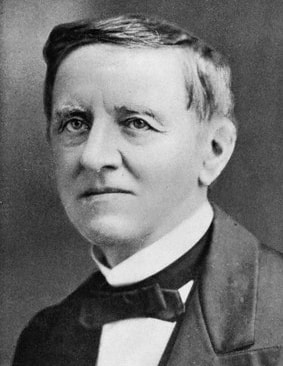

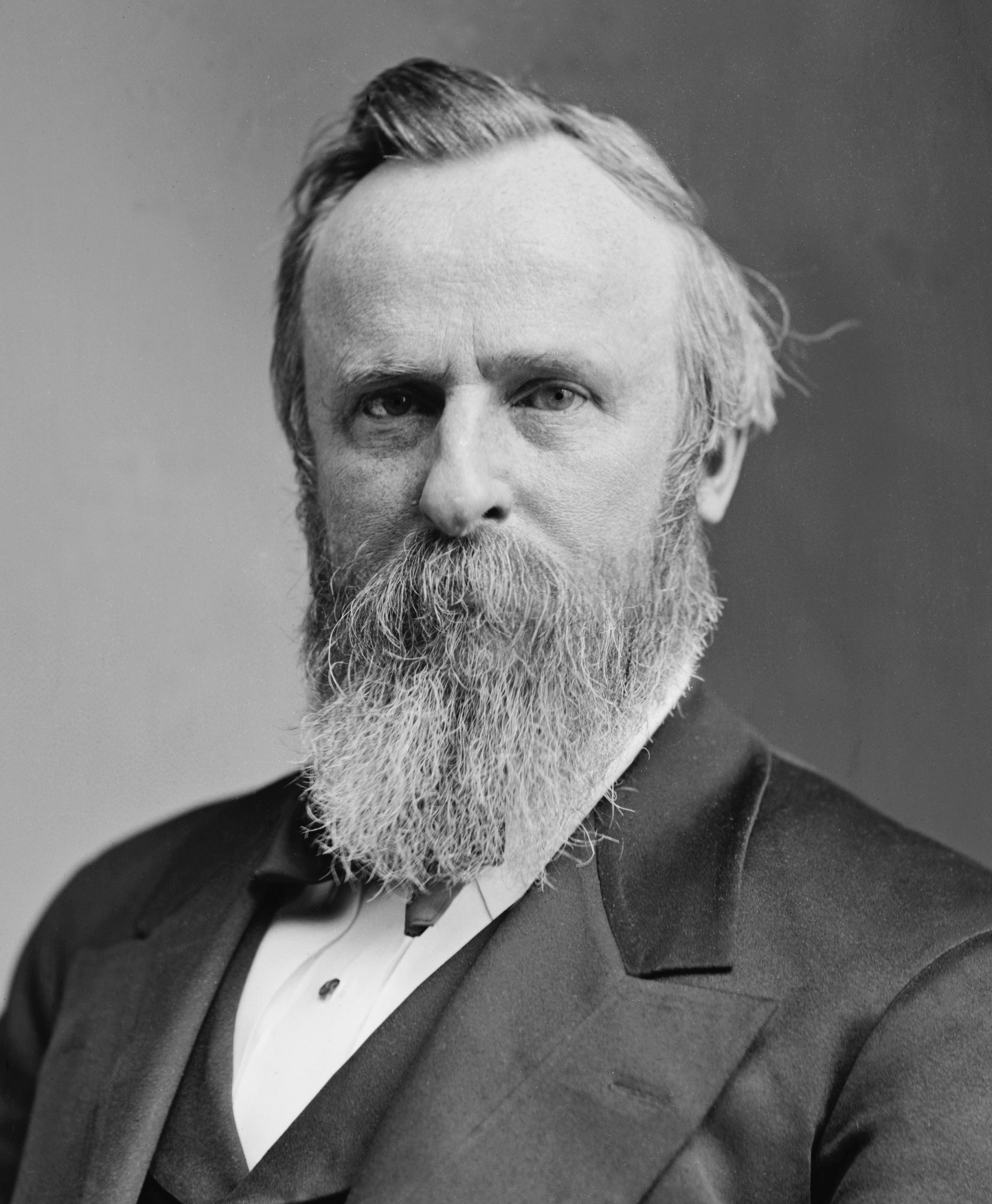
Nominee	Samuel J. Tilden	Rutherford B. Hayes
Party	Democratic	Republican
Home state	New York	Ohio
Running mate	Thomas A. Hendricks	William A. Wheeler
Electoral vote	15	0
Popular vote	202,086	145,027
Percentage	57.64%	41.36%
County results
Tilden
40–50%
50–60%
60–70%
70–80%
80–90%
90–100%
Hayes
40–50%
50–60%
60–70%
70–80%
80–90%
President before election
Ulysses S. Grant
Republican
Elected President
Rutherford B. Hayes
Republican

The 1876 United States presidential election in Missouri took place on November 7, 1876, as part of the 1876 United States presidential election. Voters chose 15 representatives, or electors, to the Electoral College, who voted for president and vice president.

Missouri voted for the Democratic nominee, Samuel J. Tilden, over the Republican nominee, Rutherford B. Hayes. Tilden won Missouri by a margin of 16.28%.

== Results ==
1876 United States presidential election in Missouri
Party	Candidate	Votes	%
Democratic	Samuel J. Tilden	202,086	57.64%
Republican	Rutherford B. Hayes	145,027	41.36%
Greenback	Peter Cooper	3,497	1.00%
Total votes		350,610	100%

=== Results by county ===
1876 United States presidential election in Missouri (by county)
County	Samuel J. Tilden Democratic		Rutherford B. Hayes Republican		Peter Cooper Greenback		Total votes cast
County	#	%	#	%	#	%	Total votes cast
Adair	1,192	42.27%	1,604	56.88%	24	0.85%	2,820
Andrew	1,503	47.73%	1,590	50.49%	56	1.78%	3,149
Atchison	1,117	46.23%	1,156	47.85%	143	5.92%	2,416
Audrain	2,268	73.07%	836	26.93%	0	0.00%	3,104
Barry	1,001	49.70%	1,000	49.65%	13	0.65%	2,014
Barton	760	50.30%	710	46.99%	41	2.71%	1,511
Bates	2,071	58.32%	1,478	41.62%	2	0.06%	3,551
Benton	851	43.71%	1,096	56.29%	0	0.00%	1,947
Bollinger	998	63.57%	572	36.43%	0	0.00%	1,570
Boone	3,845	76.44%	1,181	23.48%	4	0.08%	5,030
Buchanan	4,136	61.68%	2,496	37.22%	74	1.10%	6,706
Butler	696	75.16%	230	24.84%	0	0.00%	926
Caldwell	1,058	41.39%	1,383	54.11%	115	4.50%	2,556
Callaway	3,493	78.09%	976	29.82%	4	0.09%	4,473
Camden	540	45.84%	638	54.16%	0	0.00%	1,178
Cape Girardeau	1,836	56.32%	1,417	43.47%	7	0.21%	3,260
Carroll	2,403	54.51%	1,977	44.85%	28	0.64%	4,408
Carter	209	68.30%	80	26.14%	17	5.56%	306
Cass	2,277	61.03%	1,440	38.60%	14	0.38%	3,731
Cedar	904	49.53%	921	50.47%	0	0.00%	1,825
Chariton	3,165	64.43%	1,719	35.00%	28	0.57%	4,912
Christian	494	34.67%	927	65.05%	4	0.28%	1,425
Clark	1,581	51.36%	1,494	48.54%	3	0.10%	3,078
Clay	2,844	83.43%	508	14.90%	57	1.67%	3,409
Clinton	1,756	61.48%	1,019	35.68%	81	2.84%	2,856
Cole	1,529	58.18%	1,099	41.82%	0	0.00%	2,628
Cooper	2,331	56.84%	1,770	43.16%	0	0.00%	4,101
Crawford	1,036	57.88%	754	42.12%	0	0.00%	1,790
Dade	893	40.04%	1,305	58.52%	32	1.43%	2,230
Dallas	652	44.93%	761	52.45%	38	2.62%	1,451
Daviess	1,848	52.57%	1,663	47.31%	4	0.11%	3,515
DeKalb	1,083	48.03%	1,110	49.22%	62	2.75%	2,255
Dent	826	64.94%	446	35.06%	0	0.00%	1,272
Douglas	136	14.67%	744	80.26%	47	5.07%	927
Dunklin	1,148	92.51%	93	7.49%	0	0.00%	1,241
Franklin	2,294	51.61%	2,149	48.35%	2	0.04%	4,445
Gasconade	558	32.52%	1,158	67.48%	0	0.00%	1,716
Gentry	1,461	55.89%	1,138	43.53%	15	0.57%	2,614
Greene	2,315	46.06%	2,565	51.03%	146	2.90%	5,026
Grundy	1,113	38.08%	1,810	61.92%	0	0.00%	2,923
Harrison	1,373	40.50%	2,013	59.38%	4	0.12%	3,390
Henry	2,380	61.34%	1,499	38.63%	1	0.03%	3,880
Hickory	390	38.20%	631	61.80%	0	0.00%	1,021
Holt	1,315	44.41%	1,628	54.98%	18	0.61%	2,961
Howard	2,371	69.33%	1,048	30.64%	1	0.03%	3,420
Howell	495	51.94%	458	48.06%	0	0.00%	953
Iron	805	67.59%	386	32.41%	0	0.00%	1,191
Jackson	5,438	61.54%	2,909	32.92%	490	5.54%	8,837
Jasper	2,905	44.26%	3,138	47.81%	520	7.92%	6,563
Jefferson	1,853	61.56%	1,157	38.44%	0	0.00%	3,010
Johnson	2,734	55.54%	2,183	44.34%	6	0.12%	4,923
Knox	1,538	56.90%	1,165	43.10%	0	0.00%	2,703
Laclede	1,009	57.62%	731	41.75%	11	0.63%	1,751
Lafayette	2,281	56.81%	1,734	43.19%	0	0.00%	4,015
Lawrence	1,137	42.81%	1,180	44.43%	339	12.76%	2,656
Lewis	2,059	60.94%	1,320	39.06%	0	0.00%	3,379
Lincoln	2,294	69.35%	1,004	30.35%	10	0.30%	3,308
Linn	1,914	50.29%	1,878	49.34%	14	0.37%	3,806
Livingston	2,013	53.27%	1,616	42.76%	150	3.97%	3,779
Macon	2,776	57.65%	1,752	36.39%	287	5.96%	4,815
Madison	1,277	73.94%	447	25.88%	3	0.17%	1,727
Maries	840	76.99%	251	23.01%	0	0.00%	1,091
Marion	3,099	64.23%	1,723	35.71%	3	0.06%	4,825
McDonald	715	64.01%	400	35.81%	2	0.18%	1,117
Mercer	960	38.66%	1,501	60.45%	22	0.89%	2,483
Miller	662	43.93%	836	55.47%	9	0.60%	1,507
Mississippi	1,195	72.29%	458	27.71%	0	0.00%	1,653
Moniteau	1,607	58.46%	1,142	41.54%	0	0.00%	2,749
Monroe	3,422	85.32%	589	14.68%	0	0.00%	4,011
Montgomery	1,809	55.68%	1,411	43.43%	29	0.89%	3,249
Morgan	1,038	58.12%	748	41.88%	0	0.00%	1,786
New Madrid	1,042	78.64%	283	21.36%	0	0.00%	1,325
Newton	1,732	51.97%	1,546	46.38%	55	1.65%	3,333
Nodaway	2,411	51.48%	2,213	47.26%	59	1.26%	4,683
Oregon	656	91.24%	63	8.76%	0	0.00%	719
Osage	1,082	54.37%	895	44.97%	13	0.65%	1,990
Ozark	231	35.11%	427	64.89%	0	0.00%	658
Pemiscot	745	98.81%	8	1.06%	1	0.13%	754
Perry	1,150	62.70%	683	37.24%	1	0.05%	1,834
Pettis	2,833	57.42%	2,098	42.52%	3	0.06%	4,934
Phelps	1,216	61.69%	750	38.05%	5	0.25%	1,971
Pike	3,167	59.15%	2,122	39.63%	65	1.21%	5,354
Platte	2,648	75.40%	864	24.60%	0	0.00%	3,512
Polk	1,209	46.59%	1,385	53.37%	1	0.04%	2,595
Pulaski	748	64.65%	408	35.26%	1	0.09%	1,157
Putnam	809	34.98%	1,478	63.90%	26	1.12%	2,313
Ralls	1,687	76.75%	511	23.25%	0	0.00%	2,198
Randolph	3,538	73.40%	1,269	26.33%	13	0.27%	4,820
Ray	2,492	68.71%	1,107	30.52%	28	0.77%	3,627
Reynolds	622	84.40%	115	15.60%	0	0.00%	737
Ripley	438	79.35%	114	20.65%	0	0.00%	552
Saline	3,942	69.52%	1,728	30.48%	0	0.00%	5,670
Schuyler	1,117	54.70%	908	44.47%	17	0.83%	2,042
Scotland	1,464	57.96%	1,060	41.96%	2	0.08%	2,526
Scott	1,163	79.17%	306	20.83%	0	0.00%	1,469
Shannon	419	81.36%	96	18.64%	0	0.00%	515
Shelby	1,672	63.26%	957	36.21%	14	0.53%	2,643
St. Charles	2,509	54.89%	2,062	45.11%	0	0.00%	4,571
St. Clair	1,190	56.11%	931	43.89%	0	0.00%	2,121
St. Francois	1,524	72.50%	554	26.36%	24	1.14%	2,102
St. Louis	25,385	52.47%	22,916	47.37%	79	0.16%	48,380
Ste. Genevieve	1,159	68.50%	533	31.50%	0	0.00%	1,692
Stoddard	1,403	77.47%	406	22.42%	2	0.11%	1,811
Stone	159	26.90%	432	73.10%	0	0.00%	591
Sullivan	1,447	49.30%	1,488	50.70%	0	0.00%	2,935
Taney	351	51.18%	368	48.82%	0	0.00%	719
Texas	1,144	66.98%	563	32.96%	1	0.06%	1,708
Vernon	1,874	70.08%	774	28.95%	26	0.97%	2,674
Warren	813	39.03%	1,263	60.63%	7	0.34%	2,083
Washington	1,607	67.92%	759	32.08%	0	0.00%	2,366
Wayne	1,114	73.82%	395	26.18%	0	0.00%	1,509
Webster	1,076	51.56%	1,003	48.06%	8	0.37%	2,087
Worth	666	49.08%	632	46.57%	59	4.35%	1,357
Wright	498	44.86%	605	54.50%	7	0.63%	1,110
Totals	202,086	57.64%	145,027	41.36%	3,497	1.00%	350,610

==== Counties that flipped from Republican to Democratic ====
- Barry
- Clark
- Daviess
- Howell
- Franklin
- Linn
- Newton
- Nodaway
- Osage
- Perry
- Schuyler
- Worth

== See also ==
- United States presidential elections in Missouri
