= Fly Creek (Clear Creek tributary) =

Stream in the US state of Missouri

Fly Creek is a stream in Cedar and Vernon counties in southwest Missouri. It is a tributary of Clear Creek.

The stream headwaters arise in western Cedar County at 37°49′21″N 94°02′51″W. The stream flows west into Vernon County and turns north to northeast passing under U.S. Route 54 west of El Dorado Springs and on to its confluence with Clear Creek about one mile north of Route 54 at 37°52′45″N 94°04′34″W.

Fly Creek was so named on account of the many flies early settlers encountered near it.

== See also ==
- List of rivers of Missouri
