= Zodiac Springs =

Spring in Missouri, U.S.

Coordinates: 37°38′49″N 94°05′32″W

Zodiac Springs were a group of springs in southeastern Vernon County, Missouri, in the United States. The location of the spring is unknown to the GNIS. The community of Zodiac was named for the springs. The community of Zodiac was located in the southeast corner of Vernon County on the west side of Horse Creek.

Zodiac Springs was named from the fact there were twelve springs in the area, as there are twelve astrological signs.

== See also ==
- List of rivers of Missouri
