= Zodiac, Missouri =

Unincorporated area in the US state of Missouri

Coordinates: 37°38′49″N 94°05′32″W

Zodiac is an unincorporated area in Vernon County, Missouri, United States. The community was located in the southeast corner of Vernon County at the head of a small tributary to the west side of Horse Creek at an elevation of 942 feet.

== History ==
Zodiac was platted in 1881. The community took its name from nearby Zodiac Springs. A post office was established at Zodiac in 1882, and remained in operation until it was discontinued in 1914.
