= Cherry Branch =

Stream in the US state of Missouri

Coordinates: 37.7605942°N 93.9207711°W

Cherry Branch is a stream in Cedar County in the U.S. state of Missouri.

Cherry Branch was named for the cherry timber in the area.

== See also ==
- List of rivers of Missouri
