= 1872 United States presidential election in Missouri =

- November 5, 1872
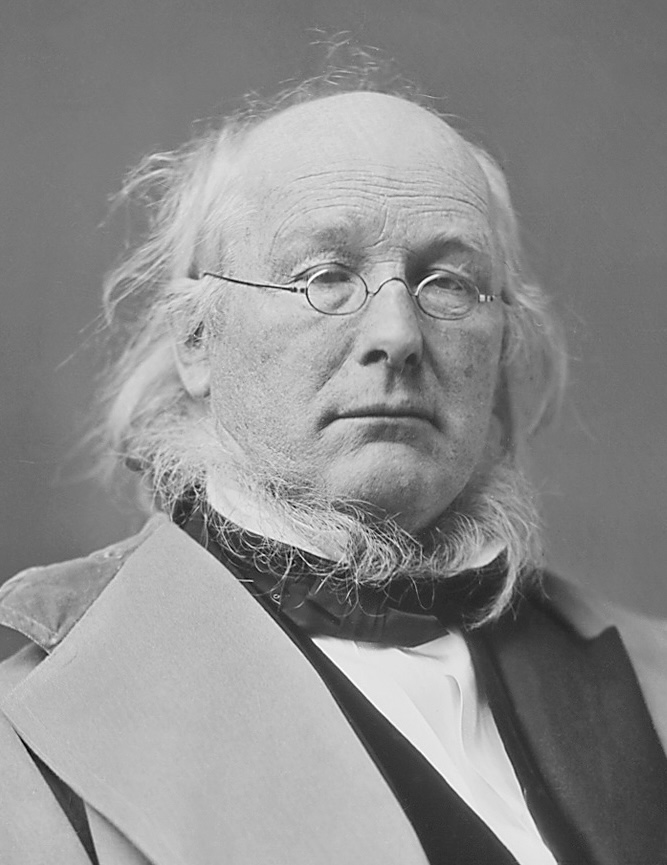

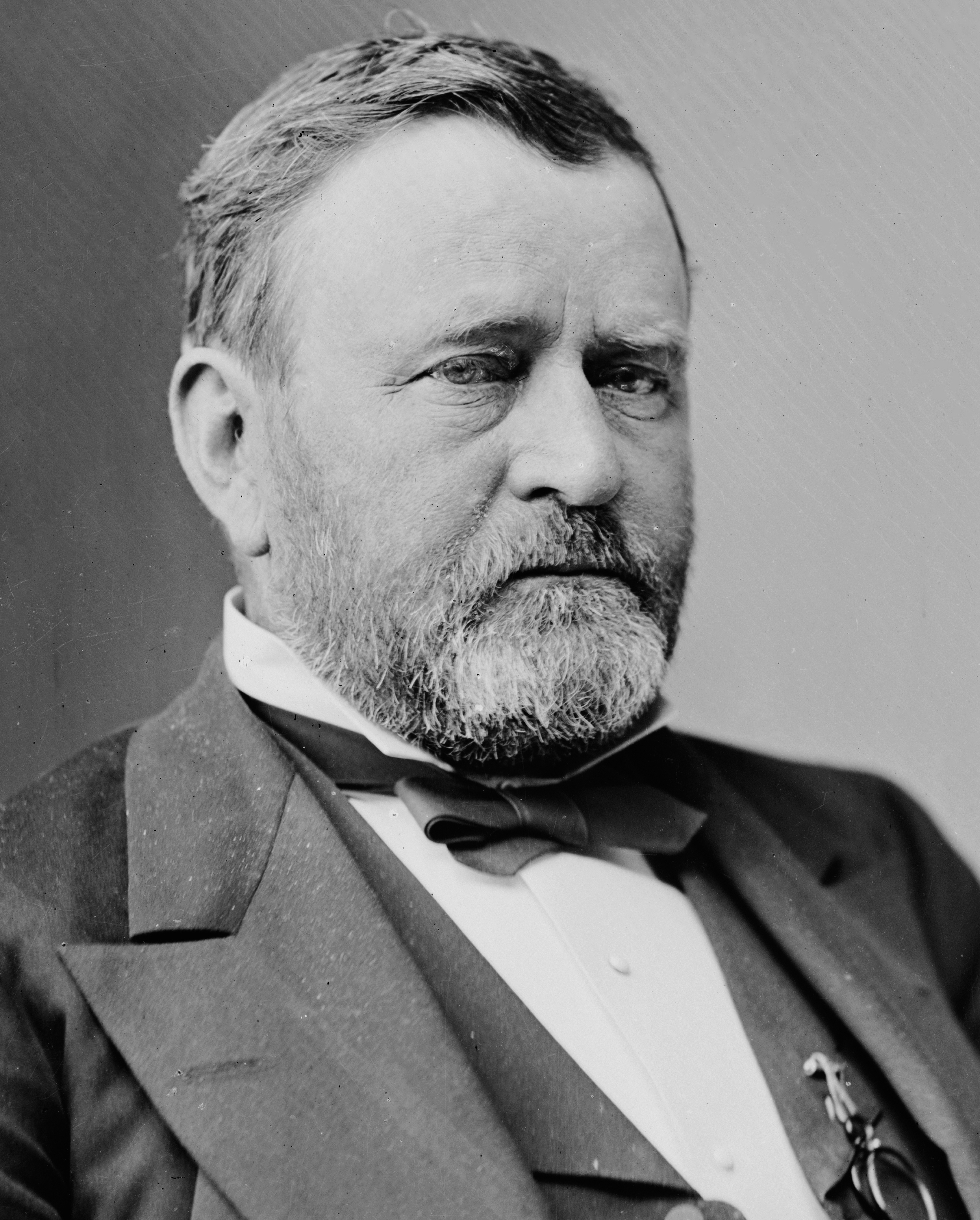
Nominee	Horace Greeley	Ulysses S. Grant
Party	Liberal Republican	Republican
Home state	New York	Illinois
Running mate	B. Gratz Brown	Henry Wilson
Popular vote	151,434	119,196
Percentage	55.46%	43.65%
County results
Greeley/Hendricks
50–60%
60–70%
70–80%
80–90%
90–100%
Grant
50–60%
60–70%
70–80%
President before election
Ulysses S. Grant
Republican
Elected President
Ulysses S. Grant
Republican
- Electoral College vote
- December 17, 1872

15 members of the Electoral College from Missouri
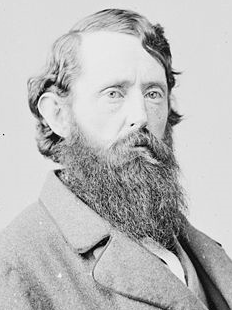

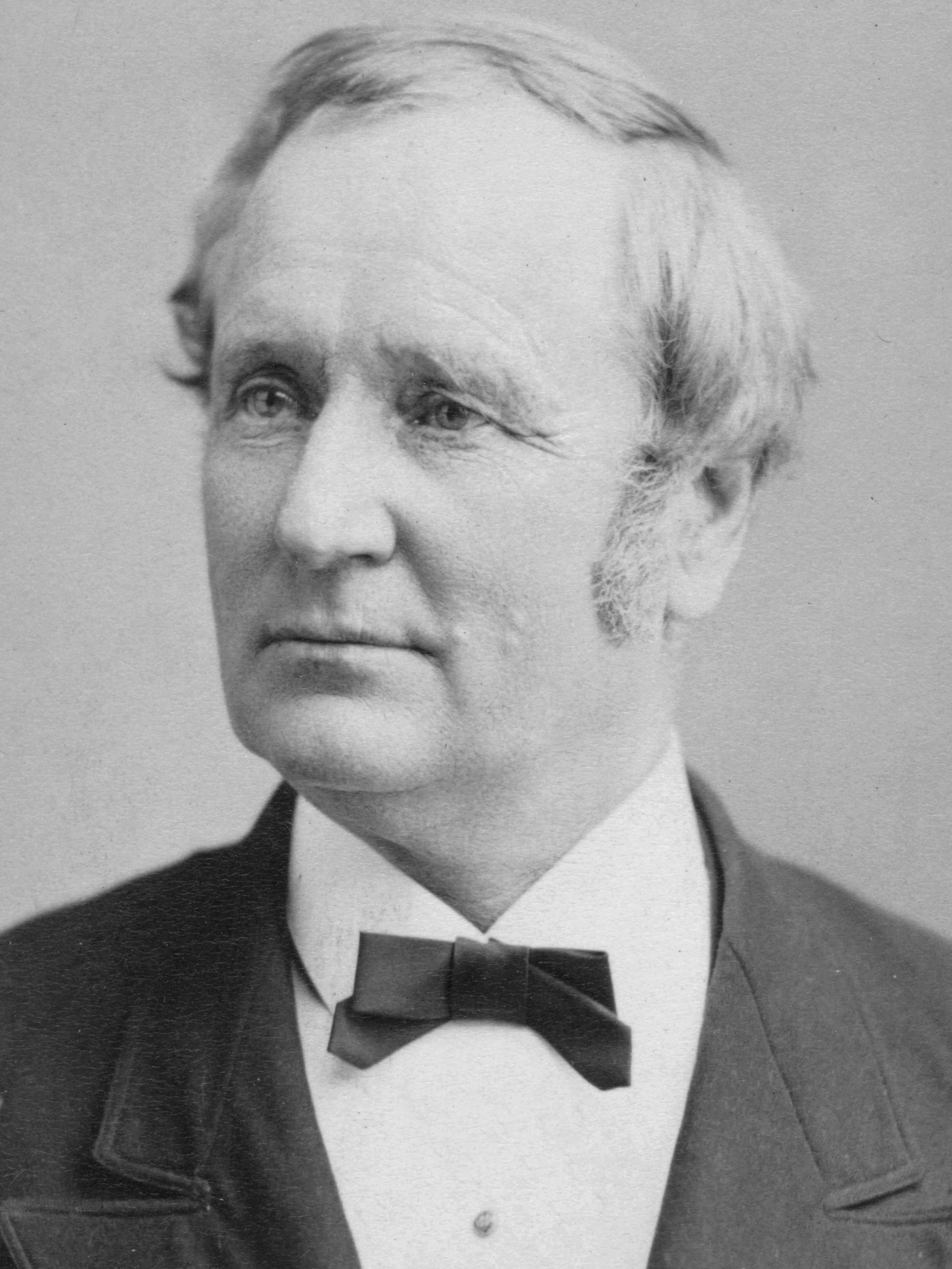

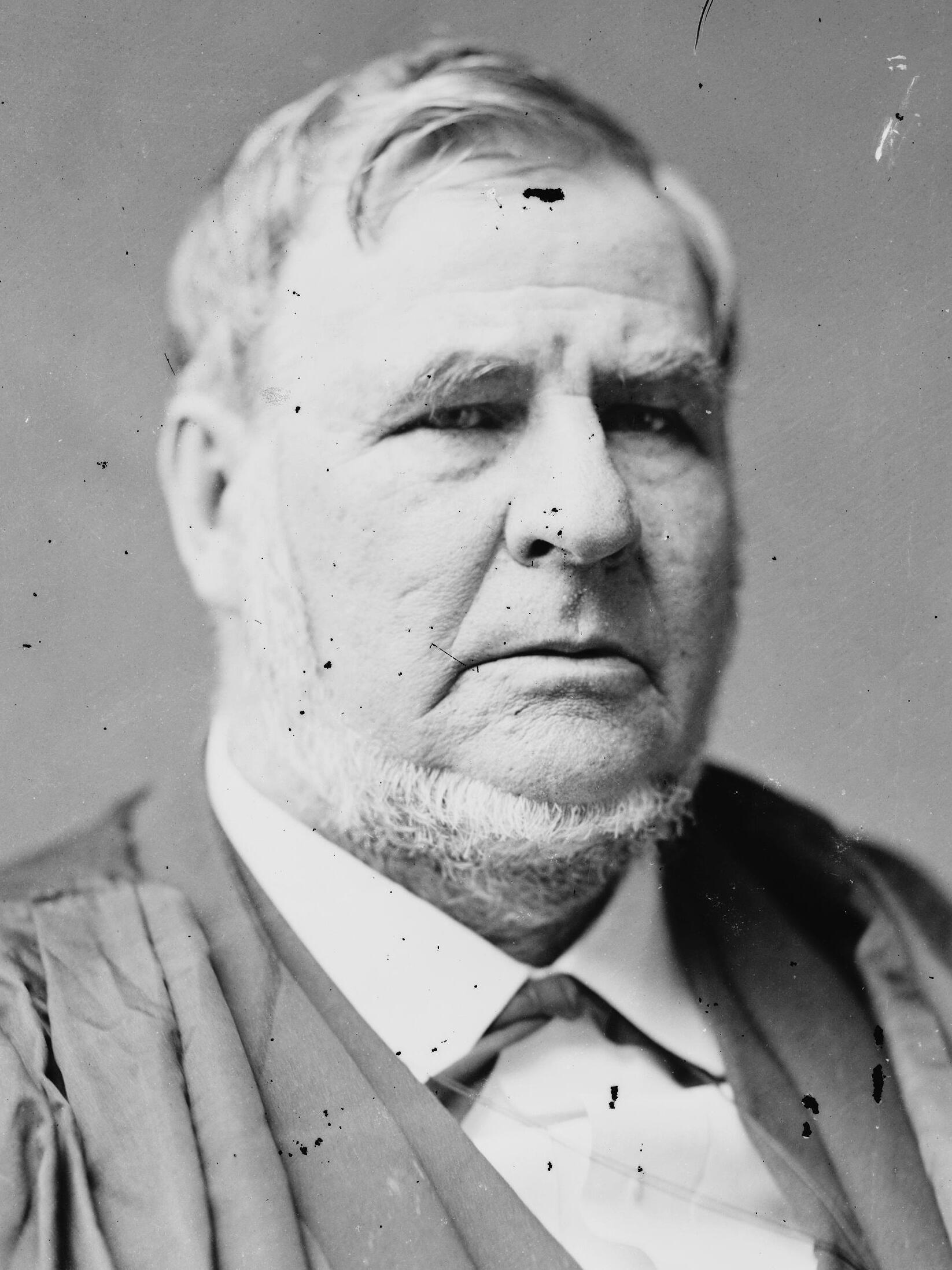
Nominee	Benjamin Gratz Brown	Thomas A. Hendricks	David Davis
Party	Liberal Republican	Democratic	Liberal Republican
Home state	Missouri	Indiana	Illinois
Electoral vote	8	6	1

The 1872 United States presidential election in Missouri took place on November 5, 1872, as part of the 1872 United States presidential election. Voters chose 15 representatives, or electors to the Electoral College, who voted for president and vice president.

Missouri voted for the Liberal Republican candidate, Horace Greeley, over Republican candidate, Ulysses S. Grant. Greeley won Missouri by a margin of 11.81%, but died prior to the Electoral College meeting, allowing Missouri's fifteen electors to vote for the candidate of their choice. 8 electors voted for Greeley's running mate Benjamin Gratz Brown, 6 chose to vote for Thomas A. Hendricks, and 1 chose to vote for David Davis.

== Results ==
1872 United States presidential election in Missouri
Party	Candidate	Votes	%
Liberal Republican	Horace Greeley	151,434	55.46%
Republican	Ulysses S. Grant	119,196	43.65%
Straight-Out Democratic	Charles O'Conor	2,429	0.89%
Total votes		273,059	100%

=== Results by County ===
1872 United States Presidential Election in Missouri (By County)
County	Horace Greeley Liberal Republican		Ulysses S. Grant Republican		Total votes cast
County	#	%	#	%	Total votes cast
Adair	961	40.24%	1,427	59.76%	2,388
Andrew	1,383	46.30%	1,604	53.70%	2,987
Atchison	912	47.67%	1,001	52.33%	1,913
Audrain	1,575	70.06%	673	29.94%	2,248
Barry	759	52.49%	687	47.51%	1,446
Barton	570	48.59%	603	51.41%	1,173
Bates	1,746	53.81%	1,499	46.19%	3,245
Benton	807	46.95%	912	53.05%	1,719
Bollinger	661	61.78%	409	38.22%	1,070
Boone	3,199	76.31%	993	23.69%	4,192
Buchanan	3,552	58.01%	2,571	41.99%	6,123
Butler	404	68.24%	188	31.76%	592
Caldwell	875	39.68%	1,330	60.32%	2,205
Callaway	2,718	79.50%	701	20.50%	3,419
Camden	403	41.68%	564	58.32%	967
Cape Girardeau	1,283	53.75%	1,104	46.25%	2,387
Carroll	1,699	53.44%	1,480	46.56%	3,179
Carter	126	80.77%	30	19.23%	156
Cass	2,012	58.07%	1,453	41.93%	3,465
Cedar	743	49.04%	772	50.96%	1,515
Chariton	2,342	63.57%	1,342	38.43%	3,684
Christian	253	27.62%	663	72.38%	916
Clark	1,254	49.33%	1,288	50.67%	2,542
Clay	2,207	70.69%	528	19.31%	2,735
Clinton	1,418	59.26%	975	40.74%	2,393
Cole	1,322	53.57%	1,146	46.43%	2,468
Cooper	2,179	60.34%	1,432	39.66%	3,611
Crawford	677	56.37%	524	43.63%	1,201
Dade	701	42.15%	962	57.85%	1,663
Dallas	451	36.31%	791	63.69%	1,242
Daviess	1,349	48.98%	1,405	51.02%	2,754
DeKalb	841	45.26%	1,017	54.74%	1,858
Dent	515	56.66%	394	43.34%	909
Dunklin	807	87.81%	112	12.19%	919
Franklin	1,582	47.84%	1,725	52.16%	3,307
Gasconade	276	23.92%	878	76.08%	1,154
Gentry	1,181	53.44%	1,029	46.56%	2,210
Greene	1,666	44.45%	2,082	55.55%	3,748
Grundy	774	35.23%	1,423	64.77%	2,197
Harrison	1,115	38.92%	1,750	61.08%	2,865
Henry	2,124	58.19%	1,526	41.81%	3,650
Hickory	249	27.54%	655	72.46%	904
Holt	844	38.00%	1,377	62.00%	2,221
Howard	1,972	69.31%	873	30.69%	2,845
Howell	356	48.17%	383	51.83%	739
Iron	600	61.41%	377	38.59%	977
Jackson	4,475	61.39%	2,814	38.61%	7,289
Jasper	1,338	39.01%	2,092	60.99%	3,430
Jefferson	1,240	58.55%	878	41.45%	2,118
Johnson	2,504	52.13%	2,299	47.87%	4,803
Knox	1,161	57.73%	850	42.27%	2,011
Laclede	825	59.74%	556	40.26%	1,381
Lafayette	2,984	66.21%	1,523	33.79%	4,507
Lawrence	1,098	47.80%	1,199	52.20%	2,297
Lewis	1,703	60.56%	1,109	39.44%	2,812
Lincoln	1,537	70.44%	645	29.56%	2,182
Linn	1,478	46.71%	1,686	53.29%	3,164
Livingston	1,745	52.62%	1,571	47.38%	3,316
Macon	2,335	57.23%	1,745	42.77%	4,080
Madison	724	68.05%	340	31.95%	1,064
Maries	439	63.44%	253	36.56%	692
Marion	2,593	60.61%	1,685	39.39%	4,278
McDonald	157	52.33%	143	47.67%	300
Mercer	527	30.50%	1,201	69.50%	1,728
Miller	716	45.29%	865	54.71%	1,581
Mississippi	725	70.18%	308	29.82%	1,033
Moniteau	1,275	56.39%	986	43.61%	2,261
Monroe	2,559	84.96%	453	15.04%	3,012
Montgomery	1,284	54.73%	1,062	45.27%	2,346
Morgan	895	57.67%	657	42.33%	1,552
New Madrid	796	76.61%	243	23.39%	1,039
Newton	1,036	47.22%	1,158	52.78%	2,194
Nodaway	1,503	47.18%	1,683	52.82%	3,186
Oregon	445	92.37%	54	7.63%	499
Osage	209	21.35%	770	78.65%	979
Ozark	135	31.91%	288	68.09%	423
Pemiscot	476	97.94%	10	2.06%	486
Perry	621	46.14%	725	53.86%	1,346
Pettis	1,965	53.98%	1,675	46.02%	3,640
Phelps	906	56.55%	696	43.45%	1,602
Pike	2,578	59.70%	1,740	40.30%	4,318
Platte	2,148	69.65%	936	30.35%	3,084
Polk	998	45.99%	1,172	54.01%	2,170
Pulaski	534	62.24%	324	37.76%	858
Ralls	1,177	75.06%	391	24.94%	1,568
Randolph	2,212	71.77%	870	28.23%	3,082
Ray	2,257	66.03%	1,161	33.97%	3,418
Reynolds	400	76.19%	125	23.81%	525
Ripley	314	76.40%	97	23.60%	411
Saline	2,790	68.50%	1,283	31.50%	4,073
Schuyler	788	49.87%	792	50.13%	1,580
Scotland	1,130	56.39%	874	43.61%	2,004
Scott	804	64.42%	444	35.58%	1,248
Shannon	242	92.37%	20	7.63%	262
Shelby	1,281	59.17%	884	40.83%	2,165
St. Charles	1,672	51.75%	1,559	48.25%	3,231
St. Clair	1,159	53.02%	1,027	46.98%	2,186
St. Francois	1,028	69.93%	442	30.07%	1,470
St. Louis	19,399	53.74%	16,701	46.26%	36,100
Ste. Genevieve	634	62.28%	384	37.72%	1,018
Stoddard	660	67.42%	319	32.58%	979
Stone	122	25.96%	348	74.04%	470
Sullivan	1,119	49.69%	1,133	50.31%	2,252
Taney	201	37.22%	339	62.78%	540
Texas	838	63.53%	481	36.47%	1,319
Vernon	1,344	69.10%	601	30.90%	1,945
Warren	567	36.02%	1,007	63.98%	1,574
Washington	878	57.80%	641	42.20%	1,519
Wayne	565	61.48%	354	38.52%	919
Webster	808	51.43%	763	48.57%	1,571
Worth	446	45.65%	531	54.35%	977
Wright	484	46.67%	553	53.33%	1,037
Totals	151,434	55.96%	119,196	44.04%	270,630

== See also ==
- United States presidential elections in Missouri
