= 1880 United States presidential election in Missouri =

- November 2, 1880
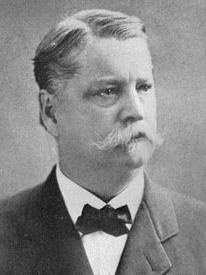

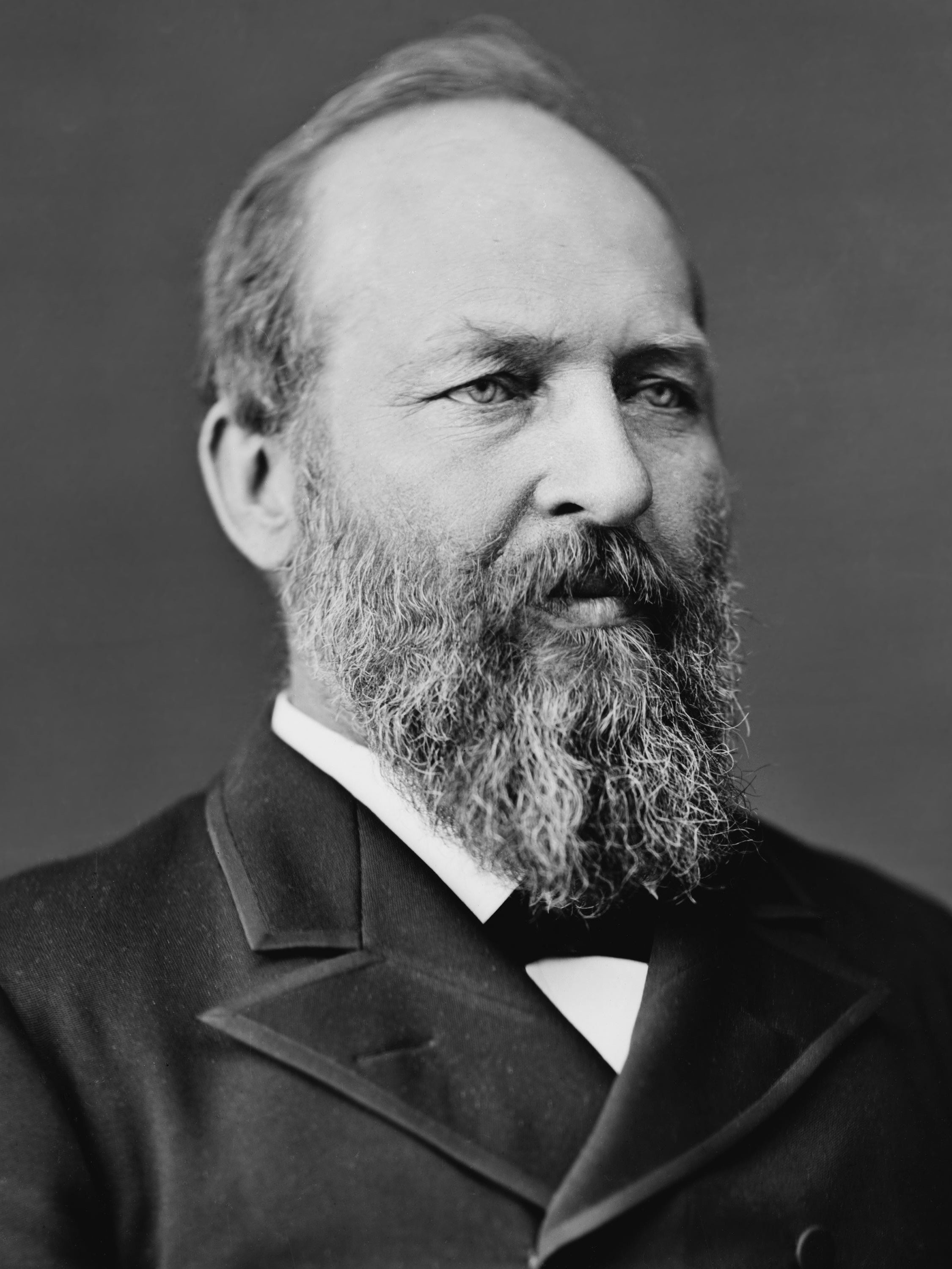

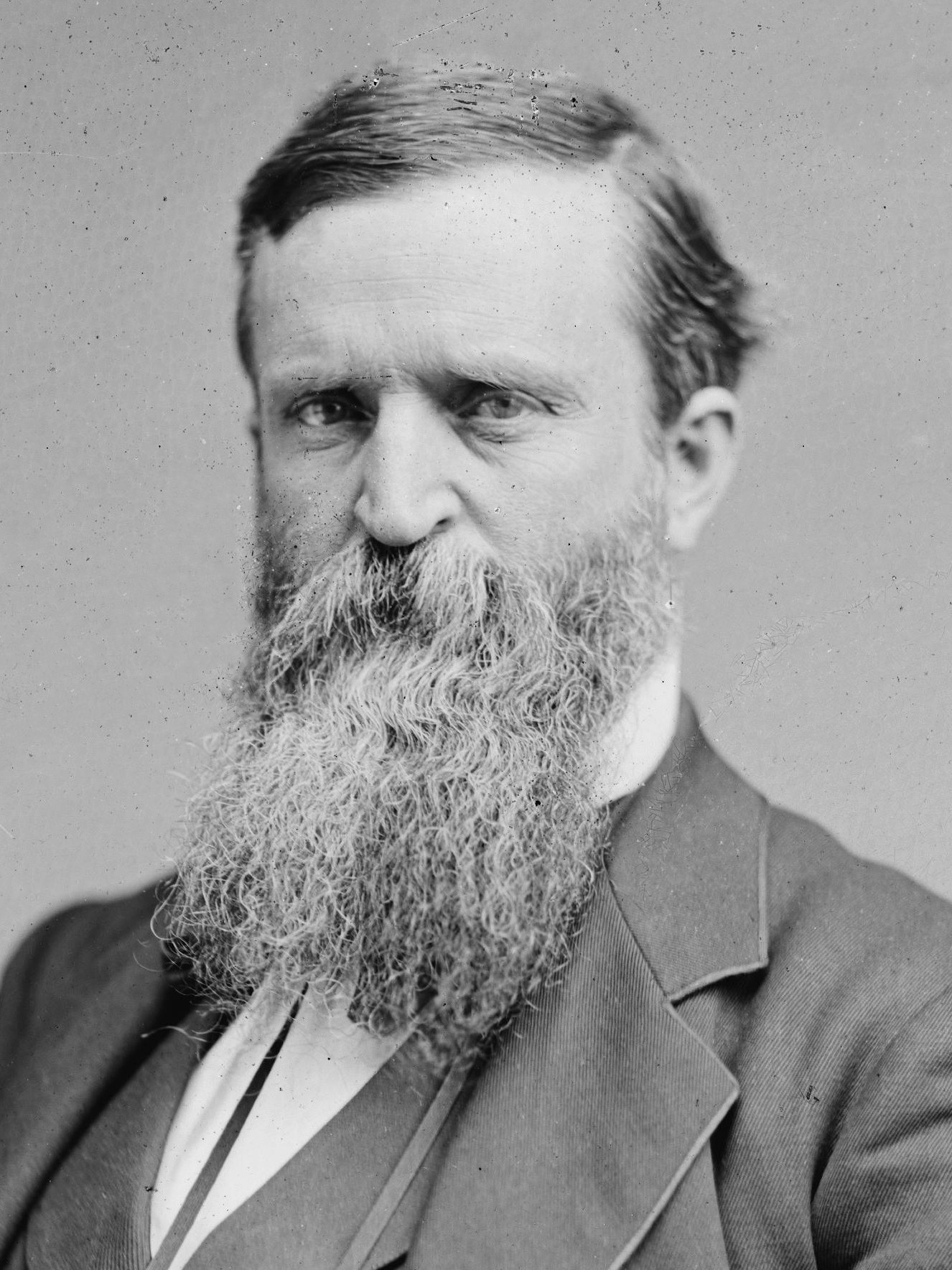
Nominee	Winfield Scott Hancock	James A. Garfield	James B. Weaver
Party	Democratic	Republican	Greenback
Home state	Pennsylvania	Ohio	Iowa
Running mate	William Hayden English	Chester A. Arthur	Barzillai J. Chambers
Electoral vote	15	0	0
Popular vote	208,600	153,647	35,042
Percentage	52.51%	38.67%	8.82%
County results
Hancock
40–50%
50–60%
60–70%
70–80%
80–90%
Garfield
30–40%
40–50%
50–60%
60–70%
70–80%
Weaver
30–40%
40–50%
President before election
Rutherford B. Hayes
Republican
Elected President
James A. Garfield
Republican

The 1880 United States presidential election in Missouri took place on November 2, 1880, as part of the 1880 United States presidential election. Voters chose 15 representatives, or electors to the Electoral College, who voted for president and vice president.

Missouri voted for the Democratic nominee, Winfield Scott Hancock, over the Republican nominee, James A. Garfield by a margin of 13.84%.

== Results ==
1880 United States presidential election in Missouri
Party	Candidate	Votes	%
Democratic	Winfield Scott Hancock	208,600	52.51%
Republican	James A. Garfield	153,647	38.67%
Greenback	James B. Weaver	35,042	8.82%
Total votes		397,289	100%

=== Results by county ===
1880 United States Presidential Election in Missouri (by county)
County	Winfield Scott Hancock Democratic		James A. Garfield Republican		James B. Weaver Greenback		Total votes cast
County	#	%	#	%	#	%	Total votes cast
Adair	1,269	39.02%	1,657	50.95%	326	10.02%	3,252
Andrew	1,571	45.23%	1,781	51.28%	121	3.48%	3,473
Atchison	1,261	42.33%	1,228	41.22%	490	16.45%	2,979
Audrain	2,322	60.55%	983	25.63%	530	13.82%	3,835
Barry	1,163	47.28%	970	39.43%	327	13.29%	2,460
Barton	942	41.81%	599	26.59%	712	31.60%	2,253
Bates	2,949	57.93%	1,897	37.26%	245	4.81%	5,091
Benton	962	41.29%	1,204	51.67%	164	7.04%	2,330
Bollinger	1,068	58.88%	629	34.67%	117	6.45%	1,814
Boone	3,269	67.30%	1,170	24.09%	418	8.61%	4,857
Buchanan	4,693	55.86%	3,317	39.48%	391	4.65%	8,401
Butler	746	66.79%	275	24.62%	96	8.59%	1,117
Caldwell	1,139	39.53%	1,369	47.52%	373	12.95%	2,881
Callaway	3,369	72.25%	1,184	25.39%	110	2.36%	4,663
Camden	507	40.02%	563	44.44%	197	15.55%	1,267
Cape Girardeau	1,869	51.74%	1,641	45.43%	102	2.82%	3,612
Carroll	2,404	49.55%	2,039	42.02%	409	8.03%	4,852
Carter	238	64.67%	80	21.74%	50	13.59%	368
Cass	2,710	57.72%	1,710	36.42%	275	5.86%	4,695
Cedar	900	43.19%	926	44.43%	258	12.38%	2,084
Chariton	2,899	57.25%	1,617	31.93%	548	10.82%	5,064
Christian	438	26.26%	791	47.42%	439	26.32%	1,668
Clark	1,570	49.17%	1,503	47.07%	120	3.76%	3,193
Clay	2,969	79.15%	589	15.70%	193	5.15%	3,751
Clinton	2,061	59.14%	1,237	35.49%	187	5.37%	3,485
Cole	1,384	49.84%	1,338	48.18%	55	1.98%	2,777
Cooper	2,189	51.01%	1,730	40.32%	372	8.67%	4,291
Crawford	1,099	55.70%	805	40.80%	69	3.50%	1,973
Dade	902	38.11%	1,227	51.84%	238	10.05%	2,367
Dallas	487	28.71%	654	38.56%	555	32.72%	1,696
Daviess	2,045	49.56%	1,796	43.53%	285	6.91%	4,126
DeKalb	1,305	47.21%	1,238	44.79%	221	8.00%	2,764
Dent	1,073	59.12%	707	38.95%	35	1.93%	1,815
Douglas	163	13.40%	497	40.87%	556	45.72%	1,216
Dunklin	1,330	87.96%	182	12.04%	0	0.00%	1,512
Franklin	2,262	45.36%	2,647	53.08%	78	1.56%	4,987
Gasconade	487	24.36%	1,512	75.64%	0	0.00%	1,999
Gentry	1,982	53.67%	1,377	37.29%	334	9.04%	3,693
Greene	1,912	35.43%	2,198	40.73%	1,286	21.83%	5,396
Grundy	1,102	35.06%	1,917	60.99%	124	3.95%	3,143
Harrison	1,586	40.44%	2,097	53.47%	239	6.09%	3,922
Henry	2,821	58.51%	1,694	35.14%	306	6.35%	4,821
Hickory	436	31.99%	675	49.52%	252	18.49%	1,363
Holt	1,297	41.65%	1,605	51.54%	212	6.81%	3,114
Howard	2,047	54.92%	1,166	31.29%	514	13.79%	3,727
Howell	726	52.16%	457	32.83%	209	15.01%	1,392
Iron	854	60.06%	565	39.73%	3	0.21%	1,422
Jackson	6,703	53.36%	5,123	40.78%	735	5.85%	12,561
Jasper	2,533	38.87%	2,874	44.10%	1,110	17.03%	6,517
Jefferson	2,012	56.28%	1,501	41.99%	62	1.73%	3,575
Johnson	2,795	50.70%	2,400	43.53%	318	5.77%	5,513
Knox	1,468	52.30%	574	20.45%	765	27.25%	2,807
Laclede	960	45.74%	365	17.39%	774	36.87%	2,099
Lafayette	3,163	62.18%	1,822	35.82%	102	2.01%	5,087
Lawrence	1,476	43.67%	1,567	46.36%	337	9.97%	3,380
Lewis	1,928	59.65%	1,152	35.64%	152	4.70%	3,232
Lincoln	2,039	58.88%	790	22.81%	634	18.31%	3,463
Linn	2,049	48.53%	1,991	47.16%	182	4.31%	4,222
Livingston	1,859	43.31%	1,165	27.14%	1,268	29.54%	4,292
Macon	2,880	52.84%	1,726	31.67%	844	15.49%	5,450
Madison	952	70.83%	391	29.09%	1	0.07%	1,344
Maries	924	72.76%	288	22.68%	58	4.57%	1,270
Marion	3,086	61.92%	1,811	36.34%	87	1.75%	4,984
McDonald	706	50.79%	213	15.32%	471	33.88%	1,390
Mercer	990	35.43%	1,573	56.30%	231	8.27%	2,794
Miller	757	39.97%	970	51.21%	167	8.82%	1,894
Mississippi	1,137	64.06%	525	29.58%	113	6.37%	1,775
Moniteau	1,323	46.93%	853	30.26%	643	22.81%	2,819
Monroe	3,488	81.51%	671	15.68%	120	2.80%	4,279
Montgomery	1,721	50.72%	1,329	39.17%	343	10.11%	3,393
Morgan	950	52.63%	798	44.21%	57	3.16%	1,805
New Madrid	1,095	77.33%	321	22.67%	0	0.00%	1,416
Newton	1,535	44.33%	957	27.63%	971	28.04%	3,463
Nodaway	2,485	43.38%	2,303	40.20%	941	16.43%	5,729
Oregon	809	88.22%	85	9.27%	23	2.51%	917
Osage	1,137	50.22%	1,117	49.34%	10	0.44%	2,264
Ozark	314	36.73%	409	47.84%	132	15.44%	855
Pemiscot	740	89.70%	85	10.30%	0	0.00%	825
Perry	1,110	53.68%	887	42.89%	71	3.43%	2,068
Pettis	2,908	51.28%	2,457	43.33%	306	5.40%	5,671
Phelps	1,132	54.01%	416	19.85%	548	26.15%	2,096
Pike	3,236	57.01%	2,151	37.90%	289	5.09%	5,676
Platte	2,693	73.04%	945	25.63%	49	1.33%	3,687
Polk	1,360	43.65%	1,506	48.33%	250	8.02%	3,116
Pulaski	772	61.61%	462	36.87%	19	1.52%	1,253
Putnam	725	27.24%	1,513	56.84%	424	15.93%	2,662
Ralls	1,800	74.47%	603	24.95%	14	0.58%	2,417
Randolph	2,927	63.92%	1,051	22.95%	601	13.13%	4,579
Ray	2,614	63.91%	908	22.20%	568	13.89%	4,090
Reynolds	747	84.31%	139	15.69%	0	0.00%	886
Ripley	578	75.75%	115	15.07%	70	9.17%	763
Saline	3,851	62.96%	1,907	31.18%	359	5.87%	6,117
Schuyler	1,065	50.91%	570	27.25%	457	21.85%	2,092
Scotland	1,405	54.61%	689	26.78%	479	18.62%	2,573
Scott	1,330	74.34%	459	25.66%	0	0.00%	1,789
Shannon	467	86.32%	65	12.01%	9	1.66%	541
Shelby	1,770	59.66%	350	28.55%	847	11.80%	2,967
St. Charles	2,191	49.27%	2,223	49.99%	33	0.74%	4,447
St. Clair	963	34.63%	765	27.51%	1,053	37.86%	2,781
St. Francois	1,750	67.62%	778	30.06%	60	2.32%	2,588
St. Louis	2,719	45.73%	3,223	54.20%	4	0.07%	5,946
St. Louis City	23,837	49.96%	23,006	48.22%	872	1.83%	47,715
Ste. Genevieve	1,081	61.04%	650	36.70%	40	2.26%	1,771
Stoddard	1,541	69.32%	590	26.54%	92	4.14%	2,223
Stone	140	19.69%	435	61.18%	136	19.13%	711
Sullivan	1,717	47.73%	1,693	47.07%	187	5.20%	3,597
Taney	313	36.52%	337	39.32%	207	24.15%	857
Texas	1,250	62.13%	477	23.71%	285	14.17%	2,012
Vernon	2,338	64.27%	940	25.84%	360	9.90%	3,638
Warren	662	29.98%	1,343	60.82%	203	9.19%	2,208
Washington	1,489	63.58%	775	33.09%	78	3.33%	2,342
Wayne	1,114	64.47%	568	32.87%	46	2.66%	1,728
Webster	1,024	46.52%	561	25.49%	616	27.99%	2,201
Worth	751	47.80%	657	41.82%	163	10.38%	1,571
Wright	409	28.90%	641	45.30%	365	25.80%	1,415
Totals	208,600	52.51%	153,647	38.67%	35,042	8.82%	397,289

==== Counties that flipped from Republican to Democratic ====
- Atchison
- DeKalb
- Sullivan

==== Counties that flipped from Democratic to Republican ====
- Franklin
- St. Charles
- Saint Louis

==== Counties that flipped from Democratic to Greenback ====
- St. Clair

==== Counties that flipped from Republican to Greenback ====
- Douglas

== See also ==
- United States presidential elections in Missouri
