= Umber View Heights, Missouri =

- Village
- Location of Umber View Heights, Missouri
- Coordinates: 37°37′27″N 93°48′13″W
- Country: United States
- State: Missouri
- County: Cedar

Area
  - Total: 0.062 sq mi (0.16 km^{2})
  - Land: 0.062 sq mi (0.16 km^{2})
  - Water: 0 sq mi (0.00 km^{2})
- Elevation: 1,043 ft (318 m)

Population (2020)
  - Total: 41
  - Density: 660.8/sq mi (255.13/km^{2})
- Time zone: UTC-6 (Central (CST))
  - Summer (DST): UTC-5 (CDT)
- FIPS code: 29-74473
- GNIS feature ID: 2400018

Umber View Heights is a village in Cedar County, Missouri, United States. The population was 41 at the 2020 census.

The name Umber is derived from one Mr. Umber, the proprietor of an early-20th-century country store.

== Geography ==
According to the United States Census Bureau, the village has a total area of 0.06 square miles (0.16 km^{2}), all land.

== Demographics ==
Historical population
Census	Pop.	Note	%±
1980	41		—
1990	34		−17.1%
2000	52		52.9%
2010	48		−7.7%
2020	41		−14.6%
U.S. Decennial Census

=== 2010 census ===
As of the census of 2010, there were 48 people, 25 households, and 16 families residing in the village. The population density was 800.0 inhabitants per square mile (308.9/km^{2}). There were 30 housing units at an average density of 500.0 per square mile (193.1/km^{2}). The racial makeup of the village was 97.9% White and 2.1% from two or more races.

There were 25 households, of which 16.0% had children under the age of 18 living with them, 52.0% were married couples living together, 8.0% had a female householder with no husband present, 4.0% had a male householder with no wife present, and 36.0% were non-families. 32.0% of all households were made up of individuals, and 16% had someone living alone who was 65 years of age or older. The average household size was 1.92 and the average family size was 2.38.

The median age in the village was 54 years. 14.6% of residents were under the age of 18; 0% were between the ages of 18 and 24; 14.6% were from 25 to 44; 39.6% were from 45 to 64; and 31.3% were 65 years of age or older. The gender makeup of the village was 45.8% male and 54.2% female.

=== 2000 census ===
As of the census of 2000, there were 52 people, 25 households, and 18 families residing in the village. The population density was 768.0 inhabitants per square mile (296.5/km^{2}). There were 29 housing units at an average density of 428.3 per square mile (165.4/km^{2}). The racial makeup of the village was 98.08% White, 1.92% from other races. Hispanic or Latino of any race were 1.92% of the population.

There were 25 households, out of which 16.0% had children under the age of 18 living with them, 72.0% were married couples living together, and 28.0% were non-families. 24.0% of all households were made up of individuals, and 12.0% had someone living alone who was 65 years of age or older. The average household size was 2.08 and the average family size was 2.39.

In the village, the population was spread out, with 15.4% under the age of 18, 23.1% from 25 to 44, 25.0% from 45 to 64, and 36.5% who were 65 years of age or older. The median age was 54 years. For every 100 females, there were 100.0 males. For every 100 females age 18 and over, there were 109.5 males.

The median income for a household in the village was $36,563, and the median income for a family was $41,250. Males had a median income of $22,917 versus $24,375 for females. The per capita income for the village was $18,050. There were 6.3% of families and 10.9% of the population living below the poverty line, including 20.0% of those under 18 and none of those over 64.
