= Osiris, Missouri =

Unincorporated community in the US state of Missouri

Coordinates: 37°40′04″N 94°02′09″W

Osiris is an unincorporated community in Cedar County, in the U.S. state of Missouri.

== History ==
A post office called Osiris was established in 1901, and remained in operation until 1906. The community was named after Osiris, the Egyptian god.
