= Kate Austin =

American journalist (1864–1902)

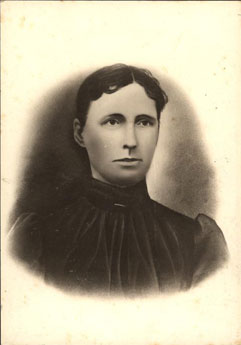
- Born: Catherine Cooper; July 25, 1864; LaSalle County, Illinois, U.S.
- Died: October 28, 1902 (aged 38); Kingman, Kansas, U.S.
- Occupation: Journalist

Kate Cooper Austin (July 25, 1864 – October 28, 1902) was an American journalist and advocate of feminist and anarchist causes.

== Early life ==
Born Catherine Cooper on July 25, 1864, in LaSalle County, Illinois, Austin moved with her family to Hook's Point, Iowa, when she was six. At the age of 11, Austin lost her mother and had to raise her seven brothers and sisters. Reading became one of her amusements.

== Career ==
It was in Hook's Point, Iowa, that she married a young farmer, Sam Austin, in August 1883. Around the same time, her father discovered Lucifer, an anarchist/free love journal published by Moses Harman. Austin and her entire family were influenced by Hamon's writings, but it was the Haymarket Riot of 1886 and the ensuing reaction that brought Austin to anarchism.

Her devotion to liberty made her an anarchist; her hostility to patriarchy made her a feminist. She was too much the former to join the organized women's movements of her day, and too much the latter to ally with mainline political anarchists—most of them men—whose devotion to liberty often stopped short of women's liberation.

— Miller, Howard S. Kate Austin: A Feminist-Anarchist on the Farmer's Last Frontier.

A member of the American Press Writers' Association, Austin wrote for many working-class and radical newspapers. She also contributed to Lucifer and to anarchist periodicals such as The Firebrand, Free Society, Discontent, and The Demonstrator. Austin's interests included sexual reform and the economic status of working people. In 1897 and 1899, Emma Goldman visited Austin at her home in Caplinger Mills, Missouri, where she gave several well-attended lectures.

== Personal life ==
In 1890, Austin and her husband, Sam Austin, both moved to Caplinger Mills, Missouri, about twenty miles away from the nearest railroad station. Austin did not feel any type of isolation, as country life was her ideal. Since Austin joined the American Press Writers Association, her work increased as she came in contact with many well known radical writers and lecturers of her time, keeping her busy reading and writing.

Austin died of tuberculosis on October 28, 1902, in Kingman, Kansas, leaving behind nine children aged between 19 and 10. Austin's body was sent back to Caplinger Mills, Missouri, as a funeral was held for her with the largest crowd that ever attended a funeral in that district.
