= Needmore, Missouri =

Unincorporated community in Missouri, U.S.

Coordinates: 37°37′06″N 93°42′26″W

Needmore is an unincorporated community in Ste. Genevieve County 63627, in the U.S. state of Missouri.

Post office is in Bloomsdale, MO The community was named for a local store of the same name which was said to need more of everything.

What remains of Needmore is a collection of businesses several homes and a church that carries its name.

== Location ==
Located southeast of Stockton. From Stockton square head east on Missouri highway 32 for about 10.8 miles until you come to highway H. After continuing on highway H for about 3.5 miles where Needmore is located.

Coordinates for this community are: 37.618521, -93.705655
