= Horse Creek (Cedar Creek tributary) =

Stream in the U.S. state of Missouri

Horse Creek is a stream in Barton, Cedar, Dade and Vernon counties in southwest Missouri. It is a tributary of Cedar Creek.

The stream headwaters arise in southern Dade County at 37°20′14″N 93°57′04″W. The stream source is just east of Missouri Route 97 south of Lockwood. The stream flows northwest under Route 97 and north passing under U.S. Route 160 just west of Lockwood. It flows northwest into Barton County just east of Layneville. It continues past Newport and Milford. Past Milford the stream turns northeast and flows into the southeast corner of Vernon County and into Cedar County northwest of West Independence. It crosses under Route 97 again and under Missouri Route 32 southeast of Filley and on to its confluence with Cedar Creek in west-central Cedar County at 37°45′58″N 93°53′01″W.

According to tradition, Horse Creek was named from an incident when frontiersmen encountered a horse carcass along the creek's course.

== Tributaries ==
- Wilkey Creek

== See also ==
- List of rivers of Missouri
