= Cedar County, Missouri =

County in Missouri, United States

- County
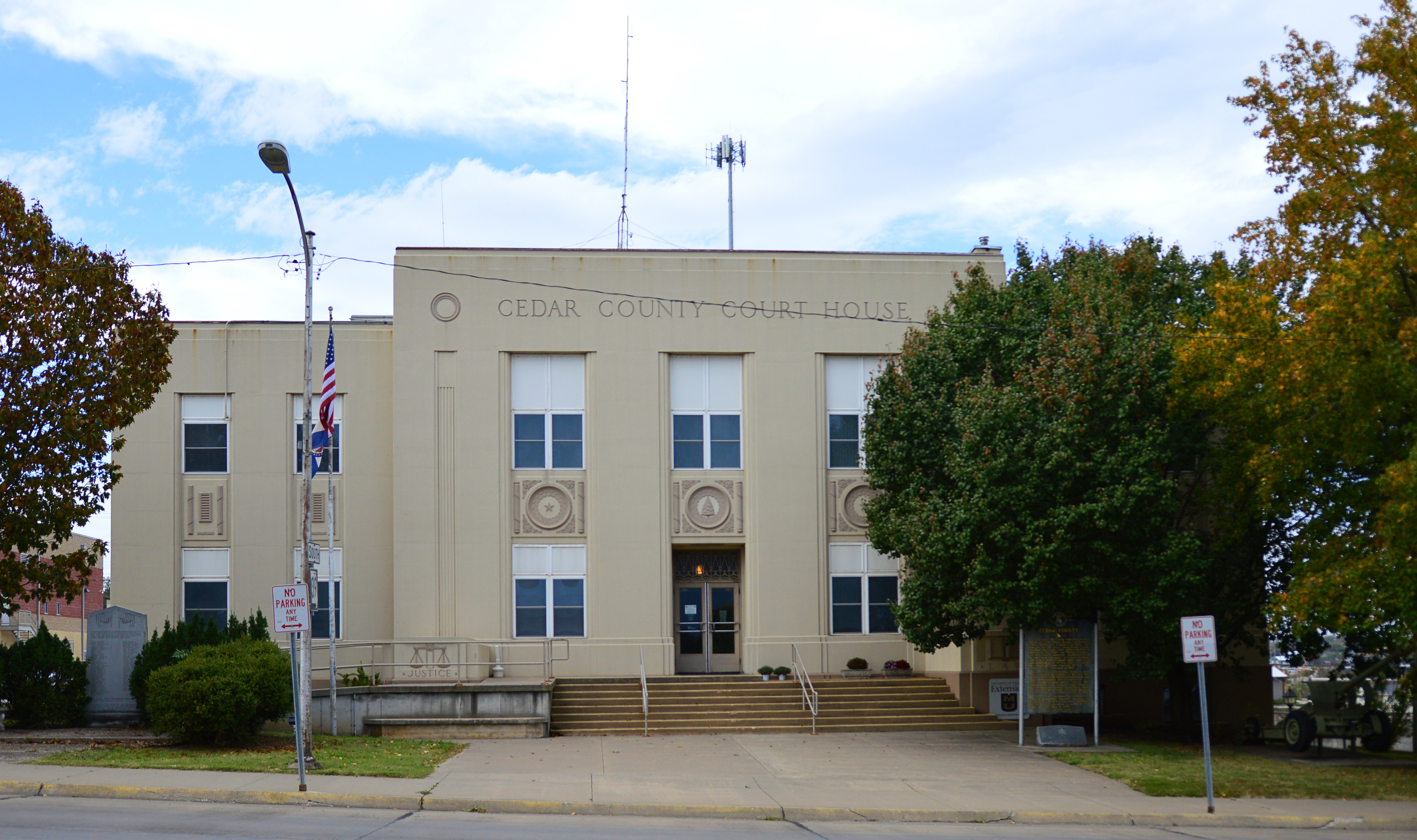
- County courthouse in Stockton

- Location within the U.S. state of Missouri
- Coordinates: 37°43′N 93°52′W
- Country: United States
- State: Missouri
- Founded: February 14, 1845
- Named for: Cedar Creek, a tributary of the Sac River
- Seat: Stockton
- Largest city: El Dorado Springs

Area
  - Total: 499 sq mi (1,290 km^{2})
  - Land: 474 sq mi (1,230 km^{2})
  - Water: 24 sq mi (62 km^{2}) 4.8%

Population (2020)
  - Total: 14,188
  - Estimate (2025): 14,888 ▲
  - Density: 29.9/sq mi (11.6/km^{2})
- Time zone: UTC−6 (Central)
  - Summer (DST): UTC−5 (CDT)
- Congressional district: 4th
- Website: cedarcountymo.gov

Cedar County is a county located in the southwest portion of the U.S. state of Missouri. As of the 2020 census, the population was 14,188. The county seat is Stockton. The county was founded February 14, 1845, and named after Cedar Creek, a tributary of the Sac River, which in turn is named from the Eastern red cedar, a common tree of the area.

== Geography ==
According to the United States Census Bureau, the county has a total area of 499 square miles (1,290 km^{2}), of which 474 square miles (1,230 km^{2}) is land and 24 square miles (62 km^{2}) (4.8%) is water. The water area includes various rivers and Stockton Lake.

=== Adjacent counties ===
- St. Clair County (north)
- Polk County (east)
- Dade County (south)
- Barton County (southwest)
- Vernon County (west)

=== Major highways ===
- U.S. Route 54
- Route 32
- Route 39
- Route 97
- Route 215

== Demographics ==
Historical population
| Census | Pop. | Note | %± |
|---|---|---|---|
| 1850 | 3,361 | | — |
| 1860 | 6,637 | | 97.5% |
| 1870 | 9,474 | | 42.7% |
| 1880 | 10,741 | | 13.4% |
| 1890 | 15,620 | | 45.4% |
| 1900 | 16,923 | | 8.3% |
| 1910 | 16,080 | | −5.0% |
| 1920 | 13,933 | | −13.4% |
| 1930 | 11,136 | | −20.1% |
| 1940 | 11,697 | | 5.0% |
| 1950 | 10,663 | | −8.8% |
| 1960 | 9,185 | | −13.9% |
| 1970 | 9,424 | | 2.6% |
| 1980 | 11,894 | | 26.2% |
| 1990 | 12,093 | | 1.7% |
| 2000 | 13,733 | | 13.6% |
| 2010 | 13,982 | | 1.8% |
| 2020 | 14,188 | | 1.5% |
| 2025 (est.) | 14,888 | ▲ | 4.9% |
U.S. Decennial Census; 1790–1960 1900–1990; 1990–2000 2010–2020

=== Racial and ethnic composition ===
Cedar County, Missouri – Racial and ethnic composition Note: the US Census treats Hispanic/Latino as an ethnic category. This table excludes Latinos from the racial categories and assigns them to a separate category. Hispanics/Latinos may be of any race.
| Race / Ethnicity (NH = Non-Hispanic) | Pop 1980 | Pop 1990 | Pop 2000 | Pop 2010 | Pop 2020 | % 1980 | % 1990 | % 2000 | % 2010 | % 2020 |
|---|---|---|---|---|---|---|---|---|---|---|
| White alone (NH) | 11,721 | 11,935 | 13,180 | 13,432 | 12,899 | 98.55% | 98.69% | 95.97% | 96.07% | 90.91% |
| Black or African American alone (NH) | 1 | 3 | 44 | 14 | 57 | 0.01% | 0.02% | 0.32% | 0.10% | 0.40% |
| Native American or Alaska Native alone (NH) | 69 | 76 | 88 | 72 | 100 | 0.58% | 0.63% | 0.64% | 0.51% | 0.70% |
| Asian alone (NH) | 21 | 20 | 63 | 44 | 42 | 0.18% | 0.17% | 0.46% | 0.31% | 0.30% |
| Native Hawaiian or Pacific Islander alone (NH) | x | x | 5 | 3 | 7 | x | x | 0.04% | 0.02% | 0.05% |
| Other race alone (NH) | 1 | 1 | 20 | 0 | 34 | 0.01% | 0.01% | 0.15% | 0.00% | 0.24% |
| Mixed race or Multiracial (NH) | x | x | 180 | 213 | 788 | x | x | 1.31% | 1.52% | 5.55% |
| Hispanic or Latino (any race) | 81 | 58 | 153 | 204 | 261 | 0.68% | 0.48% | 1.11% | 1.46% | 1.84% |
| Total | 11,894 | 12,093 | 13,733 | 13,982 | 14,188 | 100.00% | 100.00% | 100.00% | 100.00% | 100.00% |

=== 2020 census ===
As of the 2020 census, the county had a population of 14,188. The median age was 43.5 years, 25.0% of residents were under the age of 18, and 23.6% of residents were 65 years of age or older. For every 100 females, there were 100.9 males, and for every 100 females age 18 and over there were 95.3 males age 18 and over.

The racial makeup of the county was 91.6% White, 0.5% Black or African American, 0.7% American Indian and Alaska Native, 0.3% Asian, 0.1% Native Hawaiian and Pacific Islander, 0.7% from some other race, and 6.2% from two or more races. Hispanic or Latino residents of any race comprised 1.8% of the population.

There were 5,609 households in the county, of which 28.3% had children under the age of 18 living with them and 23.6% had a female householder with no spouse or partner present. About 29.4% of all households were made up of individuals and 15.9% had someone living alone who was 65 years of age or older. There were 6,930 housing units, of which 19.1% were vacant. Among occupied housing units, 75.3% were owner-occupied and 24.7% were renter-occupied. The homeowner vacancy rate was 2.3% and the rental vacancy rate was 9.2%.

None of the residents lived in urban areas while 100.0% lived in rural areas as classified by the Census Bureau.

Racial composition in Cedar County
| Race | Num. | Perc. |
|---|---|---|
| White (NH) | 12,899 | 91% |
| Black or African American (NH) | 57 | 0.4% |
| Native American (NH) | 100 | 0.7% |
| Asian (NH) | 42 | 0.3% |
| Pacific Islander (NH) | 7 | 0.05% |
| Other/Mixed (NH) | 822 | 5.8% |
| Hispanic or Latino | 261 | 1.83% |

=== 2000 census ===
As of the 2000 census, there were 13,733 people, 5,685 households, and 3,894 families residing in the county. The population density was 29 people per square mile (11 people/km^{2}). There were 6,813 housing units at an average density of 14 units per square mile (5.4/km^{2}). The racial makeup of the county was 96.58% White, 0.32% Black or African American, 0.66% Native American, 0.46% Asian, 0.04% Pacific Islander, 0.50% from other races, and 1.43% from two or more races. Approximately 1.11% of the population were Hispanic or Latino of any race.

There were 5,685 households, out of which 27.80% had children under the age of 18 living with them, 57.50% were married couples living together, 7.90% had a female householder with no husband present, and 31.50% were non-families. 28.10% of all households were made up of individuals, and 15.30% had someone living alone who was 65 years of age or older. The average household size was 2.35 and the average family size was 2.86.

In the county, the population was spread out, with 24.60% under the age of 18, 6.40% from 18 to 24, 22.80% from 25 to 44, 25.40% from 45 to 64, and 20.80% who were 65 years of age or older. The median age was 42 years. For every 100 females there were 95.90 males. For every 100 females age 18 and over, there were 90.50 males.

The median income for a household in the county was $26,694, and the median income for a family was $32,710. Males had a median income of $25,017 versus $17,594 for females. The per capita income for the county was $14,356. 17.40% of the population and 11.60% of families were below the poverty line. Out of the total population, 24.80% of those under the age of 18 and 14.20% of those 65 and older were living below the poverty line.

== Education ==
=== Public schools ===
- El Dorado Springs R-II School District – El Dorado Springs
  - El Dorado Springs Elementary School (PK-05)
  - El Dorado Springs Middle School (06–08)
  - El Dorado Springs High School (09–12)
- Stockton R-I School District – Stockton
  - Stockton Elementary School (PK-04)
  - Stockton Middle School (05–08)
  - Stockton High School (09–12)

=== Private schools ===
- Agape Boarding School – Stockton (01–12) – Baptist – Boys (now closed)
- El Dorado Christian School – El Dorado Springs (PK-12) – Church of God

Agape Baptist Academy was closed in 2023. Affiliated with the Independent Fundamental Baptist Church, the school's stated aim was working with troubled boys to turn their life around. Claims of abuse had swirled around the school for many years, yet local leaders ignored all calls for investigation. Since closure, the school and its "owners" have been the object of numerous lawsuits for forced beating, sexual assault, and forced confinement. Jason Britt was a young man who, after being rescued by his parents, died of heart and kidney failure shortly thereafter. His parents' suit, among dozens of others, calls the "school" a "concentration camp or torture colony cloaked in the guise of religion” and names six defendants, including two local sheriffs who worked at Agape. Local law enforcement routinely rounded up kids who had run away after suffering abuse but allegedly did nothing to investigate or stop the brutal practices. The suit claims workers at the academy confined Jason Britt in a padded room, forced him to strip naked for strip searches in front of others, repeatedly beat him, causing injuries requiring stitches, forced him to stand up against a wall for hours at a time while reciting Bible passages, and gang raped him.

Agape was accredited by the Association of Christian Teachers and Schools, a nonprofit that promotes “Christ-centered academic excellence” and “the highest level of educational credibility.” The association did nothing to stop abusive practices that had been the norm at Agape for decades.

Steve Robert Wukmer, a former children's minister who worked at Agape and three other now-closed boarding schools, was indicted in March for 215 counts of possessing child pornography.

Agape's closing was the fourth closing of unlicensed "christian" boarding schools in Cedar County.

=== Public libraries ===
- Cedar County Library District

== Communities ==
=== Cities and towns ===
- El Dorado Springs
- Jerico Springs
- Stockton (county seat)
- Umber View Heights

=== Unincorporated communities ===
- Arnica
- Bearcreek
- Cane Hill
- Caplinger Mills
- Cedar Springs
- Filley
- Lebeck
- Needmore
- Olympia
- Osiris
- Pacetown
- Rowland

== Notable people ==
- Kate Austin — feminist writer and anarchist
- Emil Liston — basketball coach and administrator, member of the Basketball Hall of Fame
- Eugene McCown — jazz pianist and painter

== Politics ==
=== Local ===
Cedar County, Missouri

Elected countywide officials
| Assessor | Leah Morton | Republican |
| Circuit Clerk | Sarah Turner | Republican |
| County Clerk | Chrislynn Price | Republican |
| Collector | Lisa Nelson | Republican |
| Commissioner (presiding) | Kenneth Thornton | Republican |
| Commissioner (district 1) | Don Boultinghouse | Republican |
| Commissioner (district 2) | Ted Anderson | Republican |
| Coroner | Danny Leo Greene | Republican |
| Prosecuting Attorney | Ty Gaither | Republican |
| Public Administrator | Charlotte Haden | Republican |
| Recorder | Melissa Heskett | Republican |
| Sheriff | James "Jim Bob" McCrary | Republican |
| Surveyor | Mark Francis | Republican |
| Treasurer | Carla Lowe | Republican |

The Republican Party completely controls politics at the local level in Cedar County. Republicans hold all of the elected positions in the county.

=== State ===
Past gubernatorial elections results
| Year | Republican | Democratic | Third parties |
|---|---|---|---|
| 2024 | 81.68% 5,774 | 16.16% 1,142 | 2.16% 153 |
| 2020 | 82.10% 5,771 | 15.71% 1,104 | 2.19% 154 |
| 2016 | 70.26% 4,415 | 26.53% 1,667 | 3.21% 202 |
| 2012 | 56.43% 3,383 | 40.92% 2,453 | 2.65% 159 |
| 2008 | 47.17% 2,970 | 48.22% 3,036 | 4.61% 290 |
| 2004 | 66.31% 4,096 | 32.04% 1,979 | 1.65% 102 |
| 2000 | 58.42% 3,297 | 39.69% 2,240 | 1.89% 107 |
| 1996 | 54.31% 2,827 | 42.50% 2,212 | 3.19% 166 |

Cedar County is split between two of Missouri's legislative districts that elect members of the Missouri House of Representatives. Both are represented by Republicans.

- District 125 — Dane Diehl (R-Butler). The district includes El Dorado Springs and the rest of the northern part of the county.

Missouri House of Representatives — District 125 — Cedar County (2024)
| Party | Candidate | Votes | % | ±% |
|---|---|---|---|---|
| Republican | Dane Diehl | 3,753 | 87.52% | −0.68 |
| Democratic | Lynda Jones | 535 | 12.48% | +12.48 |

Missouri House of Representatives — District 125 — Cedar County (2022)
| Party | Candidate | Votes | % | ±% |
|---|---|---|---|---|
| Republican | Dane Diehl | 2,638 | 88.20% | −11.80 |
| Libertarian | Robert E. Smith | 353 | 11.80% | +11.80 |

Missouri House of Representatives — District 125 — Cedar County (2020)
| Party | Candidate | Votes | % | ±% |
|---|---|---|---|---|
| Republican | Jim Kalberloh | 2,590 | 100.00% | +19.51 |

Missouri House of Representatives — District 125 — Cedar County (2018)
| Party | Candidate | Votes | % | ±% |
|---|---|---|---|---|
| Republican | Warren D. Love | 1,852 | 80.49% | −19.51 |
| Democratic | Chase Crawford | 449 | 19.51% | +19.51 |

- District 127 — Ann Kelley (R-Lamar). Consists of Stockton, Jerico Springs, Umber View Heights, and the rest of the southern part of the county.

Missouri House of Representatives — District 127 — Cedar County (2024)
| Party | Candidate | Votes | % | ±% |
|---|---|---|---|---|
| Republican | Ann Kelley | 2,036 | 74.74% | +4.00 |
| Democratic | Marvin Manring | 688 | 25.26% | −4.00 |

Missouri House of Representatives — District 127 — Cedar County (2022)
| Party | Candidate | Votes | % | ±% |
|---|---|---|---|---|
| Republican | Ann Kelley | 1,448 | 70.74% | −29.26 |
| Democratic | Marvin Manring | 599 | 29.26% | +29.26 |

Missouri House of Representatives — District 127 — Cedar County (2020)
| Party | Candidate | Votes | % | ±% |
|---|---|---|---|---|
| Republican | Ann Kelley | 691 | 100.00% | +26.24 |

Missouri House of Representatives — District 127 — Cedar County (2018)
| Party | Candidate | Votes | % | ±% |
|---|---|---|---|---|
| Republican | Ann Kelley | 461 | 73.76% | −8.14 |
| Democratic | Teri Hanna | 164 | 26.24% | +8.14 |

All of Cedar County is a part of Missouri's 28th district in the Missouri Senate. The seat is currently represented by Sandy Crawford (R-Buffalo). The previous incumbent, Mike Parson, was elected Lieutenant Governor in 2016, and became Governor upon the resignation of Eric Greitens in 2018. Parson was elected to a full term as governor in 2020.

Missouri Senate — District 28 — Cedar County (2022)
| Party | Candidate | Votes | % | ±% |
|---|---|---|---|---|
| Republican | Sandy Crawford | 4,528 | 100.00% | +17.16 |

Missouri Senate — District 28 — Cedar County (2018)
| Party | Candidate | Votes | % | ±% |
|---|---|---|---|---|
| Republican | Sandy Crawford | 4,412 | 82.84% | +14.68 |
| Democratic | Joe Poor | 914 | 17.16% | −14.68 |

Missouri Senate — District 28 special election — Cedar County (2017)
| Party | Candidate | Votes | % | ±% |
|---|---|---|---|---|
| Republican | Sandy Crawford | 595 | 68.16% | −31.84 |
| Democratic | Albert J. Skalicky | 278 | 31.84% | +31.84 |

=== Federal ===
All of Cedar County is included in Missouri's 4th congressional district and is currently represented by Mark Alford (R-Lake Winnebago) in the U.S. House of Representatives. Alford was elected to a second term in 2024 over Democratic challenger Jeanette Cass.

U.S. House of Representatives – Missouri's 4th congressional district – Cedar County (2024)
| Party | Candidate | Votes | % | ±% |
|---|---|---|---|---|
| Republican | Mark Alford | 5,716 | 82.40% | −0.35 |
| Democratic | Jeanette Cass | 1,019 | 14.69% | −0.56 |
| Libertarian | Thomas Holbrook | 202 | 2.91% | +0.91 |

U.S. House of Representatives – Missouri's 4th congressional district – Cedar County (2022)
| Party | Candidate | Votes | % | ±% |
|---|---|---|---|---|
| Republican | Mark Alford | 4,211 | 82.75% | +0.80 |
| Democratic | Jack Truman | 776 | 15.25% | −0.25 |
| Libertarian | Randy Langkraehr | 102 | 2.00% | −0.55 |

U.S. House of Representatives – Missouri's 4th congressional district – Cedar County (2020)
| Party | Candidate | Votes | % | ±% |
|---|---|---|---|---|
| Republican | Vicky Hartzler | 5,657 | 81.95% | +0.61 |
| Democratic | Lindsey Simmons | 1,070 | 15.50% | +0.38 |
| Libertarian | Steven K. Koonse | 176 | 2.55% | −0.24 |

U.S. House of Representatives – Missouri's 4th congressional district – Cedar County (2018)
| Party | Candidate | Votes | % | ±% |
|---|---|---|---|---|
| Republican | Vicky Hartzler | 4,406 | 81.34% | +0.94 |
| Democratic | Renee Hoagenson | 860 | 15.88% | +0.46 |
| Libertarian | Mark Bliss | 151 | 2.79% | −1.40 |

Cedar County, along with the rest of the state of Missouri, is represented in the U.S. Senate by Josh Hawley (R-Ozark) and Eric Schmitt (R-Glendale). Hawley was elected to a second term in 2024 over marine veteran Lucas Kunce.

U.S. Senate – Class I – Cedar County (2024)
| Party | Candidate | Votes | % | ±% |
|---|---|---|---|---|
| Republican | Josh Hawley | 5,649 | 79.59% | +4.74 |
| Democratic | Lucas Kunce | 1,260 | 17.75% | −3.85 |
| Libertarian | W. C. Young | 68 | 0.95% | −0.23 |
| Green | Nathan Kline | 61 | 0.86% | +0.16 |
| Better | Jared Young | 60 | 0.85% | +0.85 |

U.S. Senate – Class I – Cedar County (2018)
| Party | Candidate | Votes | % | ±% |
|---|---|---|---|---|
| Republican | Josh Hawley | 4,092 | 74.85% | +21.16 |
| Democratic | Claire McCaskill | 1,181 | 21.60% | −17.47 |
| Independent | Craig O'Dear | 91 | 1.67% | |
| Libertarian | Japheth Campbell | 65 | 1.19% | −6.05 |
| Green | Jo Crain | 38 | 0.70% | +0.70 |

Schmitt was elected to the senate in 2022 over nurse and businesswoman Trudy Busch Valentine.

U.S. Senate — Class III — Cedar County (2022)
| Party | Candidate | Votes | % | ±% |
|---|---|---|---|---|
| Republican | Eric Schmitt | 3,962 | 76.95% | +6.34 |
| Democratic | Trudy Busch Valentine | 929 | 18.04% | −6.44 |
| Libertarian | Jonathan Dine | 149 | 2.89% | +0.16 |
| Constitution | Paul Venable | 109 | 2.12% | +1.21 |

U.S. Senate — Class III — Cedar County (2016)
| Party | Candidate | Votes | % | ±% |
|---|---|---|---|---|
| Republican | Roy Blunt | 4,445 | 70.61% | +16.92 |
| Democratic | Jason Kander | 1,541 | 24.48% | −14.59 |
| Libertarian | Jonathan Dine | 172 | 2.73% | −4.51 |
| Green | Johnathan McFarland | 80 | 1.27% | +1.27 |
| Constitution | Fred Ryman | 57 | 0.91% | +0.91 |

==== Political culture ====
United States presidential election results for Cedar County, Missouri
| Year | Republican | | Democratic | | Third party(ies) | |
| Year | No. | % | No. | % | No. | % |
|---|---|---|---|---|---|---|
| 1848 | 116 | 29.97% | 271 | 70.03% | 0 | 0.00% |
| 1852 | 65 | 28.63% | 162 | 71.37% | 0 | 0.00% |
| 1856 | 0 | 0.00% | 391 | 70.58% | 163 | 29.42% |
| 1860 | 4 | 0.46% | 324 | 37.20% | 543 | 62.34% |
| 1864 | 297 | 100.00% | 0 | 0.00% | 0 | 0.00% |
| 1868 | 630 | 68.18% | 294 | 31.82% | 0 | 0.00% |
| 1872 | 772 | 50.96% | 743 | 49.04% | 0 | 0.00% |
| 1876 | 921 | 50.47% | 904 | 49.53% | 0 | 0.00% |
| 1880 | 926 | 44.43% | 900 | 43.19% | 258 | 12.38% |
| 1884 | 1,449 | 47.98% | 1,563 | 51.75% | 8 | 0.26% |
| 1888 | 1,424 | 43.07% | 1,434 | 43.38% | 448 | 13.55% |
| 1892 | 1,354 | 41.50% | 1,246 | 38.19% | 663 | 20.32% |
| 1896 | 1,881 | 43.78% | 2,400 | 55.87% | 15 | 0.35% |
| 1900 | 1,845 | 48.53% | 1,820 | 47.87% | 137 | 3.60% |
| 1904 | 1,885 | 52.90% | 1,533 | 43.03% | 145 | 4.07% |
| 1908 | 1,933 | 54.87% | 1,483 | 42.09% | 107 | 3.04% |
| 1912 | 1,242 | 36.06% | 1,392 | 40.42% | 810 | 23.52% |
| 1916 | 1,874 | 55.28% | 1,410 | 41.59% | 106 | 3.13% |
| 1920 | 3,488 | 63.48% | 1,936 | 35.23% | 71 | 1.29% |
| 1924 | 2,802 | 55.83% | 2,007 | 39.99% | 210 | 4.18% |
| 1928 | 3,340 | 65.75% | 1,728 | 34.02% | 12 | 0.24% |
| 1932 | 2,515 | 46.47% | 2,834 | 52.37% | 63 | 1.16% |
| 1936 | 3,535 | 58.80% | 2,443 | 40.64% | 34 | 0.57% |
| 1940 | 4,068 | 66.99% | 1,973 | 32.49% | 32 | 0.53% |
| 1944 | 3,576 | 70.69% | 1,478 | 29.22% | 5 | 0.10% |
| 1948 | 2,928 | 58.56% | 2,062 | 41.24% | 10 | 0.20% |
| 1952 | 3,814 | 71.71% | 1,483 | 27.88% | 22 | 0.41% |
| 1956 | 3,276 | 65.57% | 1,720 | 34.43% | 0 | 0.00% |
| 1960 | 3,730 | 70.68% | 1,547 | 29.32% | 0 | 0.00% |
| 1964 | 2,478 | 52.44% | 2,247 | 47.56% | 0 | 0.00% |
| 1968 | 2,940 | 64.08% | 1,218 | 26.55% | 430 | 9.37% |
| 1972 | 3,520 | 75.34% | 1,152 | 24.66% | 0 | 0.00% |
| 1976 | 2,752 | 55.43% | 2,192 | 44.15% | 21 | 0.42% |
| 1980 | 3,469 | 65.66% | 1,703 | 32.24% | 111 | 2.10% |
| 1984 | 3,539 | 71.08% | 1,440 | 28.92% | 0 | 0.00% |
| 1988 | 2,966 | 62.52% | 1,774 | 37.39% | 4 | 0.08% |
| 1992 | 2,085 | 39.05% | 2,064 | 38.66% | 1,190 | 22.29% |
| 1996 | 2,484 | 47.57% | 2,027 | 38.82% | 711 | 13.62% |
| 2000 | 3,530 | 62.33% | 1,979 | 34.95% | 154 | 2.72% |
| 2004 | 4,238 | 68.32% | 1,910 | 30.79% | 55 | 0.89% |
| 2008 | 4,194 | 66.01% | 2,060 | 32.42% | 100 | 1.57% |
| 2012 | 4,376 | 72.39% | 1,537 | 25.43% | 132 | 2.18% |
| 2016 | 5,021 | 79.36% | 1,011 | 15.98% | 295 | 4.66% |
| 2020 | 5,788 | 82.17% | 1,145 | 16.25% | 111 | 1.58% |
| 2024 | 6,064 | 84.36% | 1,060 | 14.75% | 64 | 0.89% |

At the presidential level, Cedar County has been solidly Republican for much of its history. Cedar County strongly favored Donald Trump in 2016, 2020, and 2024. A Democrat hasn't carried the county in a presidential election since Franklin Roosevelt's landslide victory in 1932.

Like most rural areas throughout Missouri, voters in Cedar County generally adhere to socially and culturally conservative principles which tend to influence their Republican leanings. Despite Cedar County's longstanding tradition of supporting socially conservative platforms, voters in the county have a penchant for advancing populist causes. In 2018, Missourians voted on a proposition (Proposition A) concerning right to work, the outcome of which ultimately reversed the right to work legislation passed in the state the previous year. 51.58% of Cedar County voters cast their ballots to overturn the law.

=== Missouri presidential preference primaries ===
==== 2020 ====
The 2020 presidential primaries for both the Democratic and Republican parties were held in Missouri on March 10. On the Democratic side, former Vice President Joe Biden (D-Delaware) both won statewide and carried Cedar County by a wide margin. Biden went on to defeat President Donald Trump in the general election.

Missouri Democratic presidential primary – Cedar County (2020)
| Party | Candidate | Votes | % | ±% |
|---|---|---|---|---|
| Democratic | Joe Biden | 434 | 63.92% | |
| Democratic | Bernie Sanders | 194 | 28.57% | |
| Democratic | Tulsi Gabbard | 10 | 1.47% | |
| Democratic | Others/Uncommitted | 41 | 6.04% | |

Incumbent President Donald Trump (R-Florida) faced a primary challenge from former Massachusetts Governor Bill Weld, but won both Cedar County and statewide by overwhelming margins.

Missouri Republican presidential primary – Cedar County (2020)
| Party | Candidate | Votes | % | ±% |
|---|---|---|---|---|
| Republican | Donald Trump | 1,503 | 98.24% | |
| Republican | Bill Weld | 3 | 0.20% | |
| Republican | Others/Uncommitted | 24 | 1.57% | |

==== 2016 ====
The 2016 presidential primaries for both the Republican and Democratic parties were held in Missouri on March 15. Businessman Donald Trump (R-New York) narrowly won the state overall, but Senator Ted Cruz (R-Texas) carried a plurality of the vote in Cedar County. Trump went on to win the nomination and the presidency.

Missouri Republican presidential primary – Cedar County (2016)
| Party | Candidate | Votes | % | ±% |
|---|---|---|---|---|
| Republican | Ted Cruz | 1,407 | 44.55% | |
| Republican | Donald Trump | 1,355 | 42.91% | |
| Republican | John Kasich | 182 | 5.76% | |
| Republican | Marco Rubio | 102 | 3.23% | |
| Republican | Others/Uncommitted | 112 | 3.55% | |

On the Democratic side, former Secretary of State Hillary Clinton (D-New York) narrowly won statewide, but Senator Bernie Sanders (I-Vermont) carried Cedar County by a small margin.

Missouri Democratic presidential primary – Cedar County (2016)
| Party | Candidate | Votes | % | ±% |
|---|---|---|---|---|
| Democratic | Bernie Sanders | 361 | 51.13% | |
| Democratic | Hillary Clinton | 332 | 47.03% | |
| Democratic | Others/Uncommitted | 13 | 1.84% | |

==== 2012 ====
The 2012 Missouri Republican presidential primary's results were nonbinding on the state's national convention delegates. Voters in Cedar County supported former U.S. Senator Rick Santorum (R-Pennsylvania), who finished first in the state at large, but eventually lost the nomination to former Governor Mitt Romney (R-Massachusetts). Delegates to the congressional district and state conventions were chosen at a county caucus, which selected a delegation favoring Santorum. Incumbent President Barack Obama easily won the Missouri Democratic Primary and renomination. He defeated Romney in the general election.

==== 2008 ====
In 2008, the Missouri Republican presidential primary was closely contested, with Senator John McCain (R-Arizona) prevailing and eventually winning the nomination. Former Governor Mike Huckabee (R-Arkansas) won a plurality in Cedar County, receiving more votes than any other candidate of either major party.

Missouri Republican presidential primary – Cedar County (2008)
| Party | Candidate | Votes | % | ±% |
|---|---|---|---|---|
| Republican | Mike Huckabee | 1,051 | 46.02% | |
| Republican | John McCain | 709 | 31.04% | |
| Republican | Mitt Romney | 403 | 17.64% | |
| Republican | Ron Paul | 63 | 2.76% | |
| Republican | Others/Uncommitted | 58 | 2.55% | |

Then-Senator Hillary Clinton (D-New York) decisively won the vote in Cedar County on the Democratic side. Despite initial reports that Clinton had won Missouri, Barack Obama (D-Illinois), also a Senator at the time, narrowly defeated her statewide and later became that year's Democratic nominee, going on to win the presidency.

Missouri Democratic presidential primary – Cedar County (2008)
| Party | Candidate | Votes | % | ±% |
|---|---|---|---|---|
| Democratic | Hillary Clinton | 910 | 60.30% | |
| Democratic | Barack Obama | 498 | 33.00% | |
| Democratic | Others/Uncommitted | 101 | 6.69% | |

== See also ==
- National Register of Historic Places listings in Cedar County, Missouri
