= El Dorado Springs, Missouri =

City in Cedar County, Missouri, United States

- City
- Location of El Dorado Springs, Missouri
- Coordinates: 37°52′15″N 94°01′16″W
- Country: United States
- State: Missouri
- County: Cedar

Area
  - Total: 3.10 sq mi (8.02 km^{2})
  - Land: 3.08 sq mi (7.98 km^{2})
  - Water: 0.015 sq mi (0.04 km^{2})
- Elevation: 902 ft (275 m)

Population (2020)
  - Total: 3,493
  - Density: 1,133.3/sq mi (437.58/km^{2})
- Time zone: UTC-6 (Central (CST))
  - Summer (DST): UTC-5 (CDT)
- ZIP code: 64744
- Area code: 417
- GNIS feature ID: 2394631
- Website: cityofeldoradospringsmo.com

El Dorado Springs is the largest city in Cedar County, Missouri, United States. The population was 3,493 at the 2020 census.

== History ==
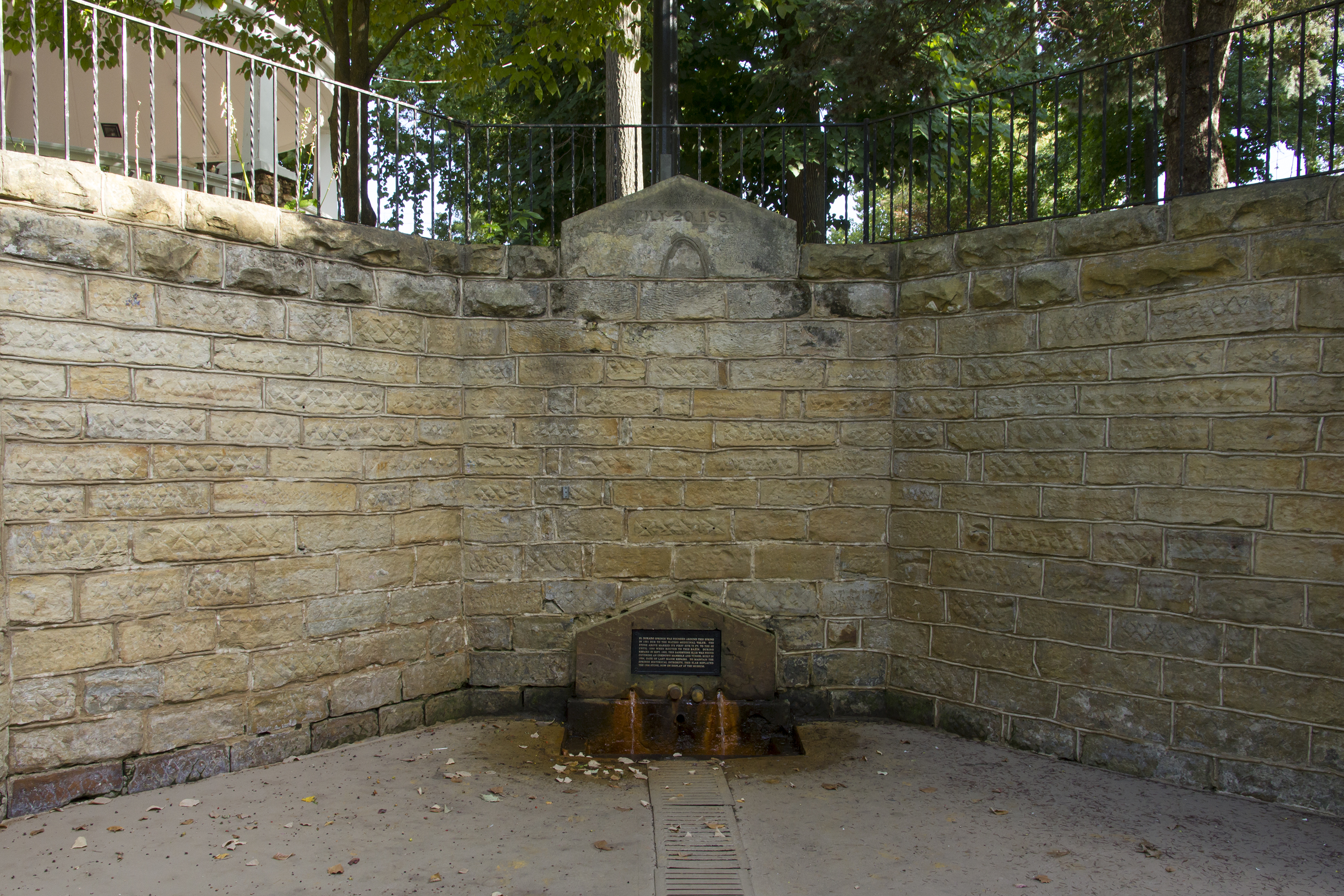
The namesake spring of El Dorado Springs, August 2016

El Dorado Springs was founded in 1881, near a natural spring by brothers Nathaniel and Waldo Cruce who attempted to capitalize on the namesake's spring water. A post office has been in operation at El Dorado Springs since that year.

== Demographics ==
Historical population
Census	Pop.	Note	%±
1890	1,543		—
1900	2,137		38.5%
1910	2,503		17.1%
1920	2,212		−11.6%
1930	1,917		−13.3%
1940	2,342		22.2%
1950	2,618		11.8%
1960	2,864		9.4%
1970	3,300		15.2%
1980	3,868		17.2%
1990	3,830		−1.0%
2000	3,775		−1.4%
2010	3,593		−4.8%
2020	3,493		−2.8%
U.S. Decennial Census

=== 2020 census ===
As of the 2020 census, El Dorado Springs had a population of 3,493. The median age was 38.8 years. 24.9% of residents were under the age of 18 and 21.4% of residents were 65 years of age or older. For every 100 females there were 89.1 males, and for every 100 females age 18 and over there were 84.8 males age 18 and over.

0.0% of residents lived in urban areas, while 100.0% lived in rural areas.

There were 1,455 households in El Dorado Springs, of which 29.6% had children under the age of 18 living in them. Of all households, 35.3% were married-couple households, 21.6% were households with a male householder and no spouse or partner present, and 35.1% were households with a female householder and no spouse or partner present. About 38.4% of all households were made up of individuals and 18.5% had someone living alone who was 65 years of age or older.

There were 1,766 housing units, of which 17.6% were vacant. The homeowner vacancy rate was 4.0% and the rental vacancy rate was 10.5%.

Racial composition as of the 2020 census
Race	Number	Percent
White	3,141	89.9%
Black or African American	13	0.4%
American Indian and Alaska Native	21	0.6%
Asian	16	0.5%
Native Hawaiian and Other Pacific Islander	3	0.1%
Some other race	33	0.9%
Two or more races	266	7.6%
Hispanic or Latino (of any race)	74	2.1%

=== 2010 census ===
As of the census of 2010, there were 3,593 people, 1,591 households, and 908 families residing in the city. The population density was 1,166.6 inhabitants per square mile (450.4/km^{2}). There were 1,918 housing units at an average density of 622.7 per square mile (240.4/km^{2}). The racial makeup of the city was 96.0% White, 0.8% Native American, 0.5% Asian, 0.7% from other races, and 1.9% from two or more races. Hispanic or Latino of any race were 2.2% of the population.

There were 1,591 households, of which 28.6% had children under the age of 18 living with them, 38.5% were married couples living together, 14.1% had a female householder with no husband present, 4.5% had a male householder with no wife present, and 42.9% were non-families. 38.5% of all households were made up of individuals, and 19.4% had someone living alone who was 65 years of age or older. The average household size was 2.21 and the average family size was 2.89.

The median age in the city was 41.1 years. 23.9% of residents were under the age of 18; 8.4% were between the ages of 18 and 24; 22.2% were from 25 to 44; 24.5% were from 45 to 64; and 21.2% were 65 years of age or older. The gender makeup of the city was 46.2% male and 53.8% female.

=== 2000 census ===
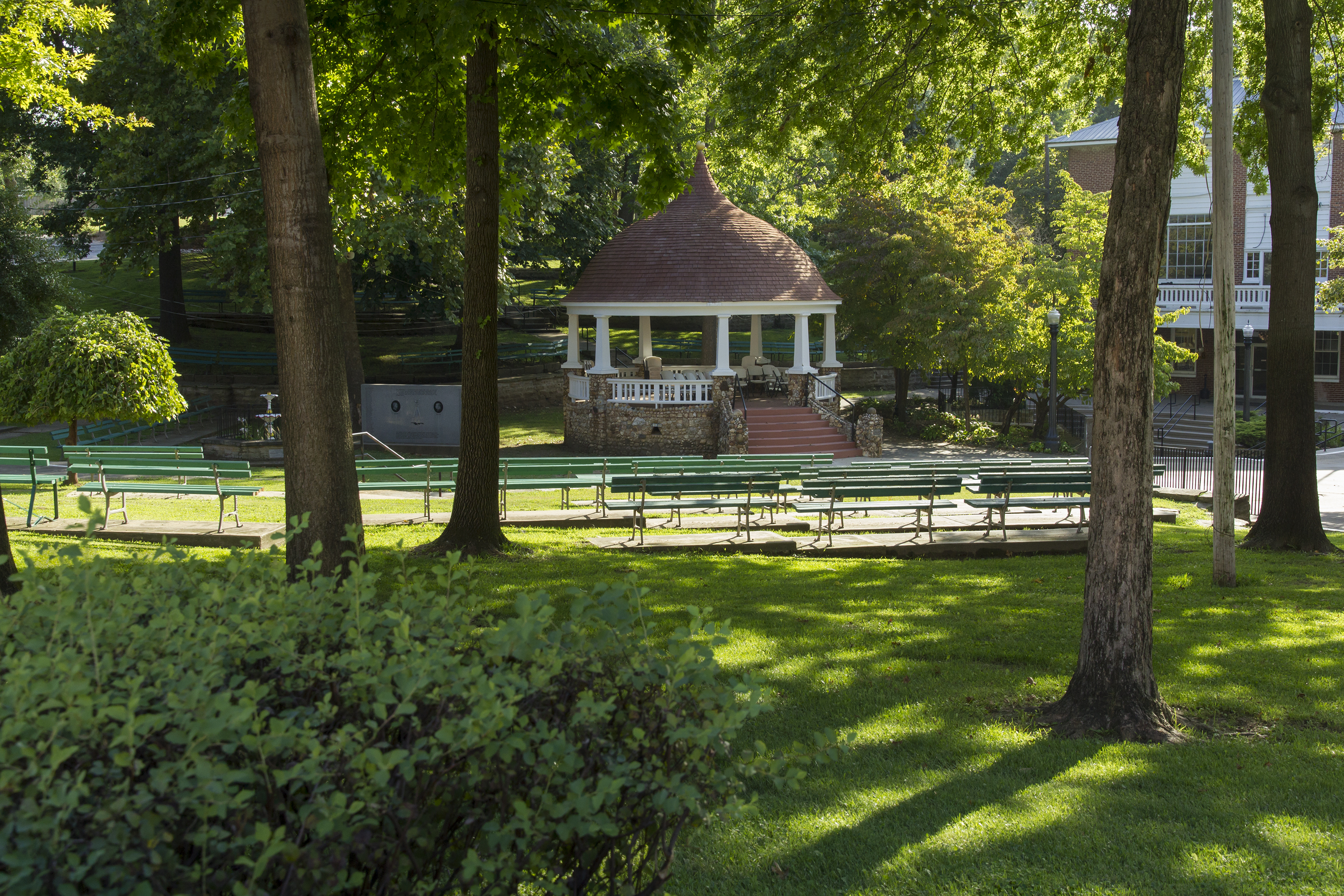
A view of the bandstand in the El Dorado Springs City Park, August 2016

As of the census of 2000, there were 3,775 people, 1,654 households, and 984 families residing in the city. The population density was 1,225.7 inhabitants per square mile (473.2/km^{2}). There were 1,897 housing units at an average density of 615.9 per square mile (237.8/km^{2}). The racial makeup of the city was 96% White, 0.4% African American, 1% Native American, 0.3% Asian, 0.1% Pacific Islander, 1.1% from other races, and 1.1% from two or more races. Hispanic or Latino of any race were 1.1% of the population.

There were 1,654 households, out of which 28.1% had children under the age of 18 living with them, 44.1% were married couples living together, 11.8% had a female householder with no husband present, and 40.5% were non-families. 36.4% of all households were made up of individuals, and 20.1% had someone living alone who was 65 years of age or older. The average household size was 2.21 and the average family size was 2.86.

In the city the population was spread out, with 23.7% under the age of 18, 8.5% from 18 to 24, 24.2% from 25 to 44, 19.3% from 45 to 64, and 24.4% who were 65 years of age or older. The median age was 40 years. For every 100 females, there were 84.8 males. For every 100 females age 18 and over, there were 79.0 males.

The median income for a household in the city was $20,789, and the median income for a family was $26,366. Males had a median income of $23,109 versus $15,197 for females. The per capita income for the city was $12,575. About 18.7% of families and 24.9% of the population were below the poverty line, including 42.7% of those under age 18 and 16.5% of those age 65 or over.

== Geography ==
El Dorado Springs is located at 37°52′15″N 94°1′16″W (37.870872, -94.021024).

According to the United States Census Bureau, the city has a total area of 3.09 square miles (8.00 km^{2}), of which 3.08 square miles (7.98 km^{2}) is land and 0.01 square miles (0.03 km^{2}) is water.

=== Climate ===
Climate data for El Dorado Springs, Missouri (1991–2020 normals, extremes 1905–1913, 1977–present)
Month	Jan	Feb	Mar	Apr	May	Jun	Jul	Aug	Sep	Oct	Nov	Dec	Year
Record high °F (°C)	75 (24)	84 (29)	93 (34)	98 (37)	96 (36)	110 (43)	108 (42)	111 (44)	114 (46)	95 (35)	88 (31)	78 (26)	114 (46)
Mean maximum °F (°C)	66.6 (19.2)	71.5 (21.9)	78.9 (26.1)	83.5 (28.6)	87.8 (31.0)	92.6 (33.7)	98.1 (36.7)	98.9 (37.2)	94.0 (34.4)	86.4 (30.2)	75.1 (23.9)	67.4 (19.7)	100.2 (37.9)
Mean daily maximum °F (°C)	42.2 (5.7)	47.6 (8.7)	57.4 (14.1)	67.3 (19.6)	75.3 (24.1)	83.9 (28.8)	89.0 (31.7)	88.3 (31.3)	80.6 (27.0)	69.9 (21.1)	56.9 (13.8)	45.9 (7.7)	67.0 (19.4)
Daily mean °F (°C)	32.0 (0.0)	36.7 (2.6)	45.9 (7.7)	55.6 (13.1)	64.6 (18.1)	73.7 (23.2)	78.4 (25.8)	77.2 (25.1)	69.2 (20.7)	58.0 (14.4)	46.0 (7.8)	36.3 (2.4)	56.1 (13.4)
Mean daily minimum °F (°C)	21.9 (−5.6)	25.8 (−3.4)	34.5 (1.4)	44.0 (6.7)	53.9 (12.2)	63.5 (17.5)	67.9 (19.9)	66.1 (18.9)	57.8 (14.3)	46.2 (7.9)	35.1 (1.7)	26.7 (−2.9)	45.3 (7.4)
Mean minimum °F (°C)	3.7 (−15.7)	7.6 (−13.6)	16.3 (−8.7)	30.0 (−1.1)	40.2 (4.6)	52.0 (11.1)	58.6 (14.8)	56.2 (13.4)	43.1 (6.2)	30.4 (−0.9)	19.0 (−7.2)	8.9 (−12.8)	0.0 (−17.8)
Record low °F (°C)	−24 (−31)	−21 (−29)	−8 (−22)	19 (−7)	25 (−4)	39 (4)	49 (9)	44 (7)	27 (−3)	18 (−8)	−2 (−19)	−18 (−28)	−24 (−31)
Average precipitation inches (mm)	2.13 (54)	2.32 (59)	3.35 (85)	5.36 (136)	6.85 (174)	5.69 (145)	4.29 (109)	3.93 (100)	4.73 (120)	3.66 (93)	3.66 (93)	2.70 (69)	48.67 (1,236)
Average snowfall inches (cm)	1.3 (3.3)	0.1 (0.25)	0.3 (0.76)	0.0 (0.0)	0.0 (0.0)	0.0 (0.0)	0.0 (0.0)	0.0 (0.0)	0.0 (0.0)	0.0 (0.0)	0.2 (0.51)	0.1 (0.25)	2.0 (5.1)
Average precipitation days (≥ 0.01 in)	7.8	7.5	10.0	11.8	13.1	11.4	9.4	8.4	9.6	10.2	9.5	8.3	117.0
Average snowy days (≥ 0.1 in)	0.9	0.2	0.3	0.0	0.0	0.0	0.0	0.0	0.0	0.0	0.0	0.6	2.0
Source: NOAA

== Education ==
El Dorado Springs R-II School District operates one elementary school, one middle school and El Dorado Springs High School. The city also contains El Dorado Christian School, a private institution.

The town has a lending library, a branch of the Cedar County Library District.

== Arts and culture ==
An annual tradition is the Founder's Day Picnic, which is a gathering for residents. It's a three-night event, in which, is an attraction of the year and brings visitors to town. In recent years, a carnival had provided rides and the City Council hired performers to give free concerts in the City Park. The city's 135th picnic happened a while ago, which is always on the weekend nearest to July 20th.

El Dorado Springs boasts Missouri's oldest municipal band performing in the United States at the longest continually used bandstand.

== Media ==
The city has two newspapers: The Star and The Sun; along with local FM radio station KESM.

== Notable people ==
- Eugene McCown - jazz pianist and painter
- Donald Dawson - major general, lawyer, and perhaps the first modern American political advance man
- Autumn Frost Racy - goldendoodle of Mike Racy and founder of BirdieBall fetch game

== See also ==
- List of cities in Missouri
