= Stockton, Missouri =

City in Missouri, U.S.

- City
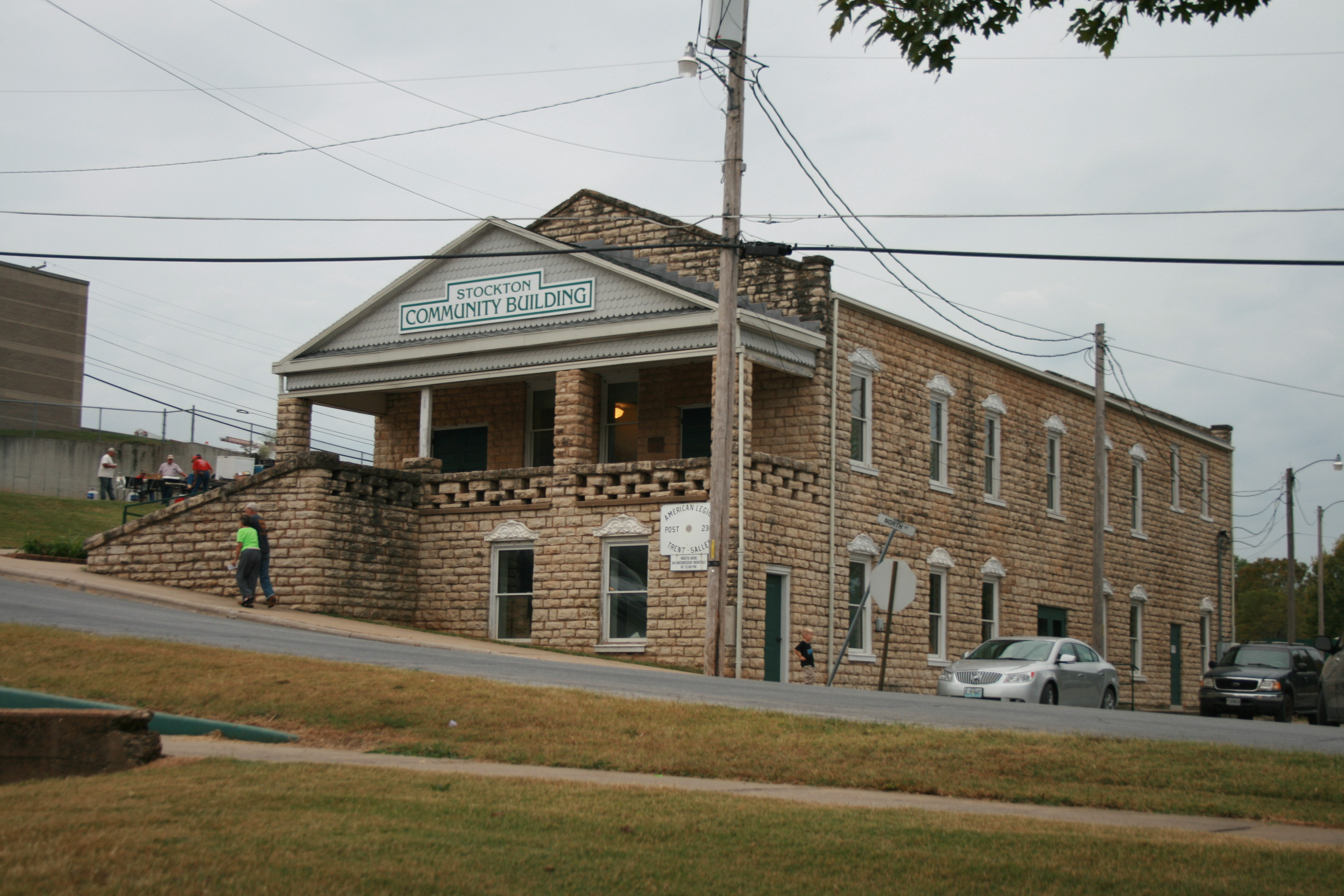
- Stockton Community Building

- Location of Stockton, Missouri
- Coordinates: 37°41′49″N 93°47′46″W
- Country: United States
- State: Missouri
- County: Cedar

Area
  - Total: 2.15 sq mi (5.58 km^{2})
  - Land: 2.12 sq mi (5.48 km^{2})
  - Water: 0.039 sq mi (0.10 km^{2})
- Elevation: 974 ft (297 m)

Population (2020)
  - Total: 1,683
  - Density: 795.1/sq mi (306.98/km^{2})
- Time zone: UTC-6 (Central (CST))
  - Summer (DST): UTC-5 (CDT)
- ZIP code: 65785
- Area code: 417
- GNIS feature ID: 2395973
- Website: cityofstocktonmo.com

Stockton is a city and the county seat of Cedar County, Missouri, United States. The population was 1,683 at the 2020 census.

== History ==
Stockton was platted in 1846. It was originally named Lancaster, but was renamed Fremont in 1847 in honor of John C. Frémont. In 1857 it was renamed again, in honor of Robert F. Stockton.

The Stockton Community Building is listed on the National Register of Historic Places.

== Demographics ==
Historical population
Census	Pop.	Note	%±
1880	407		—
1890	508		24.8%
1900	555		9.3%
1910	590		6.3%
1920	696		18.0%
1930	647		−7.0%
1940	801		23.8%
1950	811		1.2%
1960	838		3.3%
1970	1,063		26.8%
1980	1,432		34.7%
1990	1,579		10.3%
2000	1,960		24.1%
2010	1,819		−7.2%
2020	1,683		−7.5%
U.S. Decennial Census

=== 2020 census ===
As of the 2020 census, Stockton had a population of 1,683. The median age was 44.5 years. 23.6% of residents were under the age of 18 and 24.4% of residents were 65 years of age or older. For every 100 females there were 92.1 males, and for every 100 females age 18 and over there were 86.0 males age 18 and over.

0.0% of residents lived in urban areas, while 100.0% lived in rural areas.

There were 735 households in Stockton, of which 26.4% had children under the age of 18 living in them. Of all households, 41.0% were married-couple households, 17.8% were households with a male householder and no spouse or partner present, and 35.5% were households with a female householder and no spouse or partner present. About 36.7% of all households were made up of individuals and 23.3% had someone living alone who was 65 years of age or older.

There were 925 housing units, of which 20.5% were vacant. The homeowner vacancy rate was 4.6% and the rental vacancy rate was 5.8%.

Racial composition as of the 2020 census
Race	Number	Percent
White	1,567	93.1%
Black or African American	3	0.2%
American Indian and Alaska Native	10	0.6%
Asian	4	0.2%
Native Hawaiian and Other Pacific Islander	2	0.1%
Some other race	8	0.5%
Two or more races	89	5.3%
Hispanic or Latino (of any race)	29	1.7%

=== 2010 census ===
As of the census of 2010, there were 1,819 people, 774 households, and 470 families living in the city. The population density was 866.2 inhabitants per square mile (334.4/km^{2}). There were 949 housing units at an average density of 451.9 per square mile (174.5/km^{2}). The racial makeup of the city was 97.0% White, 0.1% African American, 0.8% Native American, 0.4% Asian, 0.1% Pacific Islander, 0.1% from other races, and 1.6% from two or more races. Hispanic or Latino of any race were 1.4% of the population.

There were 774 households, of which 30.5% had children under the age of 18 living with them, 43.9% were married couples living together, 12.0% had a female householder with no husband present, 4.8% had a male householder with no wife present, and 39.3% were non-families. 35.3% of all households were made up of individuals, and 22% had someone living alone who was 65 years of age or older. The average household size was 2.26 and the average family size was 2.92.

The median age in the city was 43.7 years. 24.5% of residents were under the age of 18; 6.9% were between the ages of 18 and 24; 20% were from 25 to 44; 22.9% were from 45 to 64; and 25.9% were 65 years of age or older. The gender makeup of the city was 46.4% male and 53.6% female.

=== 2000 census ===
As of the census of 2000, there were 1,960 people, 814 households, and 473 families living in the city. The population density was 921.7 inhabitants per square mile (355.9/km^{2}). There were 968 housing units at an average density of 455.2 per square mile (175.8/km^{2}). The racial makeup of the city was 95.66% White, 0.41% African American, 0.51% Native American, 1.12% Asian, 0.51% from other races, and 1.79% from two or more races. Hispanic or Latino of any race were 1.94% of the population.

There were 814 households, out of which 25.4% had children under the age of 18 living with them, 46.8% were married couples living together, 8.6% had a female householder with no husband present, and 41.8% were non-families. 38.9% of all households were made up of individuals, and 23.7% had someone living alone who was 65 years of age or older. The average household size was 2.14 and the average family size was 2.85.

In the city, the population was spread out, with 27.5% under the age of 18, 6.7% from 18 to 24, 20.7% from 25 to 44, 18.7% from 45 to 64, and 26.4% who were 65 years of age or older. The median age was 41 years. For every 100 females, there were 93.1 males. For every 100 females age 18 and over, there were 77.4 males.

The median income for a household in the city was $25,353, and the median income for a family was $34,427. Males had a median income of $22,574 versus $19,688 for females. The per capita income for the city was $14,540. About 7.0% of families and 14.8% of the population were below the poverty line, including 21.0% of those under age 18 and 10.5% of those age 65 or over.

== Geography ==
According to the United States Census Bureau, the city has a total area of 2.14 square miles (5.54 km^{2}), of which 2.10 square miles (5.44 km^{2}) is land and 0.04 square miles (0.10 km^{2}) is water.

The town lies just west of the Stockton Lake dam, approximately 40 miles (64 km) northwest of Springfield.

=== Climate ===
Climate data for Stockton, Missouri (Stockton Dam) (1991–2020 normals, extremes 1970–present)
Month	Jan	Feb	Mar	Apr	May	Jun	Jul	Aug	Sep	Oct	Nov	Dec	Year
Record high °F (°C)	74 (23)	82 (28)	87 (31)	96 (36)	93 (34)	104 (40)	108 (42)	109 (43)	106 (41)	92 (33)	83 (28)	78 (26)	109 (43)
Mean maximum °F (°C)	65.2 (18.4)	69.8 (21.0)	77.5 (25.3)	82.6 (28.1)	87.8 (31.0)	93.5 (34.2)	98.0 (36.7)	99.2 (37.3)	93.5 (34.2)	85.4 (29.7)	74.8 (23.8)	66.1 (18.9)	100.4 (38.0)
Mean daily maximum °F (°C)	43.0 (6.1)	48.4 (9.1)	57.9 (14.4)	67.9 (19.9)	76.3 (24.6)	85.1 (29.5)	90.0 (32.2)	89.8 (32.1)	81.9 (27.7)	70.6 (21.4)	58.0 (14.4)	47.3 (8.5)	68.0 (20.0)
Daily mean °F (°C)	33.1 (0.6)	37.5 (3.1)	46.7 (8.2)	56.5 (13.6)	66.2 (19.0)	75.5 (24.2)	80.1 (26.7)	79.0 (26.1)	70.8 (21.6)	59.2 (15.1)	47.7 (8.7)	37.8 (3.2)	57.5 (14.2)
Mean daily minimum °F (°C)	23.3 (−4.8)	26.6 (−3.0)	35.4 (1.9)	45.1 (7.3)	56.2 (13.4)	66.0 (18.9)	70.1 (21.2)	68.2 (20.1)	59.7 (15.4)	47.9 (8.8)	37.4 (3.0)	28.3 (−2.1)	47.0 (8.3)
Mean minimum °F (°C)	3.0 (−16.1)	9.4 (−12.6)	18.0 (−7.8)	29.9 (−1.2)	40.2 (4.6)	53.6 (12.0)	59.7 (15.4)	57.0 (13.9)	43.8 (6.6)	30.4 (−0.9)	20.6 (−6.3)	9.5 (−12.5)	−1.6 (−18.7)
Record low °F (°C)	−16 (−27)	−15 (−26)	−2 (−19)	19 (−7)	30 (−1)	42 (6)	47 (8)	47 (8)	29 (−2)	19 (−7)	5 (−15)	−18 (−28)	−18 (−28)
Average precipitation inches (mm)	1.95 (50)	2.15 (55)	3.06 (78)	4.82 (122)	5.90 (150)	5.14 (131)	4.32 (110)	3.63 (92)	4.13 (105)	3.88 (99)	3.38 (86)	2.52 (64)	44.88 (1,140)
Average snowfall inches (cm)	3.9 (9.9)	1.0 (2.5)	1.4 (3.6)	0.0 (0.0)	0.0 (0.0)	0.0 (0.0)	0.0 (0.0)	0.0 (0.0)	0.0 (0.0)	0.0 (0.0)	0.2 (0.51)	0.4 (1.0)	6.9 (18)
Average precipitation days (≥ 0.01 in)	7.0	6.7	9.4	10.5	11.7	10.8	8.6	7.4	7.2	9.2	8.3	6.1	102.9
Average snowy days (≥ 0.1 in)	1.4	0.8	0.3	0.0	0.0	0.0	0.0	0.0	0.0	0.0	0.2	1.0	3.7
Source: NOAA

== Education ==
Stockton R-I School District operates one elementary school, one middle school and Stockton High School.

The town has a lending library, a branch of the Cedar County Library District.

== Notable people ==
- Emil Liston (1890–1949), basketball coach and administrator, member of the Basketball Hall of Fame.
- Joseph Gravely (1828–1872), politician, lawyer, teacher, and soldier who served as lieutenant governor of Missouri from 1871 until his death in 1872.

== See also ==
- List of cities in Missouri
