= Greenfield =

Greenfield may refer to:

== Places ==
=== Canada ===
- Greenfield, Edmonton, Alberta, a neighbourhood
- Greenfield, Colchester County, Nova Scotia
- Greenfield, Hants County, Nova Scotia
- Greenfield, Kings County, Nova Scotia
- Greenfield, Queens County, Nova Scotia

=== United Kingdom ===
- Greenfield, Bedfordshire, England, a village
- Greenfield, Greater Manchester, England, a village
- Greenfield, Glasgow, Scotland, a neighbourhood
- Greenfield, Flintshire, Wales, a village
- Greenfield Reservoir, Oldham, Greater Manchester, England
- Greenfield Valley, Peak District National Park, England

=== United States ===
- Greenfield, Arkansas, an unincorporated community
- Greenfield, California, Monterey County, a city
- Greenfield, Kern County, California, a census-designated place
- Greenfield, Iowa, a city and county seat
- Greenfield, Illinois, a city
- Greenfield, Indiana, a city and county seat
- Greenfield, Massachusetts, a city and county seat
- Greenfield, Minnesota, a city
- Greenfield, Mississippi, an unincorporated community
- Greenfield, Missouri, a city
- Greenfield, Mississippi County, Missouri, a ghost town
- Greenfield, New Hampshire, a town
- Greenfield, New York, a town
- Greenfield Mountain, New York
- Greenfield Plantation, near Edenton, North Carolina, on the National Register of Historic Places
- Greenfield, Ohio, a village
- Greenfield, Oklahoma, a town
- Greenfield (Pittsburgh), Pennsylvania, a neighborhood
- Greenfield, Tennessee, a city
- Greenfield (Castalian Springs, Tennessee), a historic farmhouse
- Greenfield, Nelson County, Virginia, an unincorporated community
- Greenfield, Pittsylvania County, Virginia, an unincorporated community
- Greenfield (Charlotte Court House, Virginia), a historic plantation house
- Greenfield (Fincastle, Virginia), a historic plantation site
- Greenfield, Wisconsin, a city
- Greenfield, La Crosse County, Wisconsin, a town
- Greenfield, Monroe County, Wisconsin, a town
- Greenfield, Sauk County, Wisconsin, a town
- Greenfield Township (disambiguation)

=== Elsewhere ===
- Mount Greenfield, Coats Land, Antarctica
- Greenfield District, Mandaluyong, Philippines

== Schools ==
- Greenfield Academy, Newton Aycliffe, County Durham, England
- Greenfield Community College, Greenfield, Massachusetts, U.S.
- Greenfield School (disambiguation)
- Greenfield Hebrew Academy, Greater Atlanta, Georgia, United States, a former day school

== Music ==
- Greenfield Festival, an annual rock music festival held on the outskirts of Interlaken, Bern, Switzerland

== Other uses ==
- Greenfield (surname)
- Greenfield F.C., a football club based in Greenfield, Wales
- Greenfield, an informal North American name for metallic flexible electrical conduit
- Greenfield filter, an inferior vena cava filter that is surgically placed to prevent pulmonary emboli
- Greenfield (Minecraft), a fictional city created in Minecraft

== See also ==
- Greenfield Park (disambiguation)
- Greenfield Stadium (disambiguation)
- Green Fields (disambiguation)
- Alexander Macdonell of Greenfield (1782–1835), Canadian businessman and politician
- Greenfield agreement, an employment agreement for a new organisation
- Greenfield land, a piece of undeveloped land (the opposite of brownfield land)
- Greenfield project, a project which lacks any constraints imposed by prior work
- Greenfield status, a term used after a decommissioned site is restored to its original condition prior to any development
