= Greenfield, Nova Scotia =

Greenfield, Nova Scotia may refer to the following communities in Canada:

- Greenfield, Colchester County
- Greenfield, Hants County
- Greenfield, Kings County
- Greenfield, Queens County

== See also ==
- Greenfield (disambiguation)
