= Greenfield School =

Greenfield School, Greenfields school, or Green Fields School may refer to:

== Primary schools ==
- Greenfield Park Primary International School, Quebec
- Greenfields School, East Sussex, England

== Secondary schools ==
- Greenfield High School (California), Greenfield, California
- Greenfield High School (Illinois), Greenfield, Illinois
- Greenfield High School (Massachusetts)
- Greenfield High School (Missouri), a public high school in Greenfield, Missouri, United States
- Greenfield School (North Carolina), a private pre-K–12 school in Wilson, North Carolina
- Greenfield High School (Wisconsin)
- Greenfield-Central High School, Indiana
- Greenfield High School, a former school merged into Nodaway Valley High School

== K-12 schools ==
- Green Fields School, Tucson, Arizona
- Greenfield International School, Dubai, United Arab Emirates

== Historical school buildings ==
- Greenfield School (Greenfield, Indiana), an historic building in Hancock County, Indiana
- Greenfield Elementary School (Pittsburgh, Pennsylvania)
- Greenfield School (West Allis, Wisconsin)

== See also ==
- Greenfield (disambiguation)
- Greenfield Academy, Newton Aycliffe, County Durham, England
- Greenfield Community College, Greenfield, Massachusetts, U.S.
