= Green Fields (disambiguation) =

"Green Fields" is a 2007 song by The Good, the Bad & the Queen.

Green Fields or Greenfields may also refer to:

== Places ==
=== Australia ===
- Green Fields, South Australia, a northern suburb of Adelaide
  - Greenfields railway station
- Greenfields, Western Australia, a suburb of Mandurah, south of the City of Perth

=== India ===
- Green fields, Ooty, Tamil Nadu, India

=== United States ===
- Greenfields, Pennsylvania

== Music ==
- Green Fields, a 1981 album by The Watersons
- Greenfields (album), a 2021 album by Barry Gibb
- "Greenfields" (song), a song recorded by The Brothers Four in 1960
- "Green Fields" (Union Trade Song)

== Other uses ==
- Green Fields (film), a 1937 film directed by Jacob Ben-Ami and Edgar G. Ulmer
- Green Fields School, in Tucson, Arizona
- Greenfields (Cecilton, Maryland), a historic home
- Greenfields (dairy company), an Indonesian dairy company

== See also ==
- Greenfield (disambiguation)
