= Tropical Storm Claudette (2021) =

Atlantic tropical storm

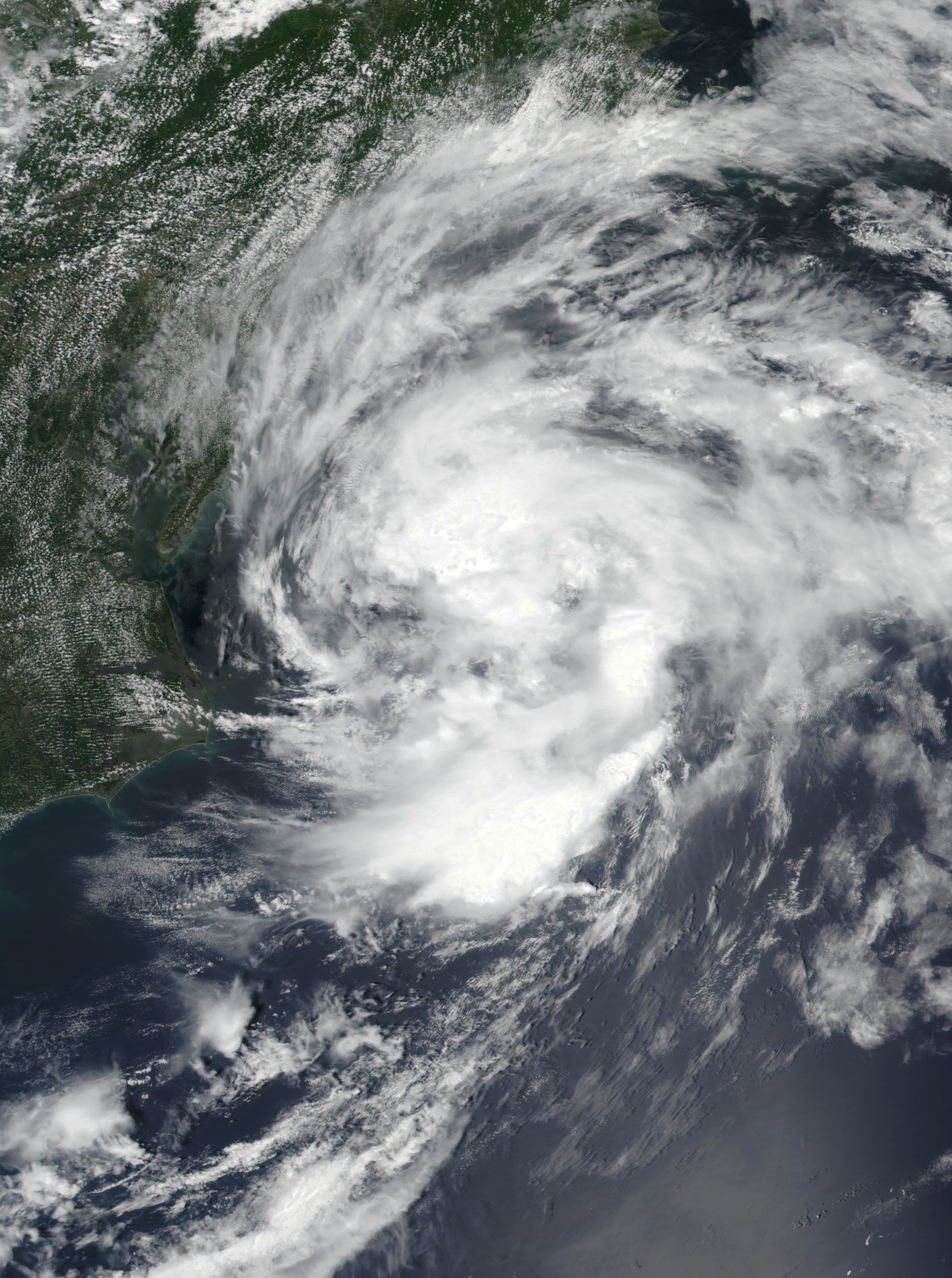
- Tropical Storm Claudette at its secondary peak intensity on June 21 along the North Carolina coastline

Meteorological history
- Formed: June 19, 2021
- Post-tropical: June 22, 2021
- Dissipated: June 23, 2021

Tropical storm
- 1-minute sustained (SSHWS/NWS)
- Highest winds: 45 mph (75 km/h)
- Lowest pressure: 1003 mbar (hPa); 29.62 inHg

Overall effects
- Fatalities: 14 total (Note: 4 direct, 10 indirect)
- Damage: $375 million (2021 USD)
- Areas affected: Oaxaca, Veracruz, Gulf Coast of the United States, Georgia, Carolinas, Atlantic Canada
- IBTrACS
- Part of the 2021 Atlantic hurricane season

Tropical Storm Claudette was a weak tropical cyclone that caused heavy rain and tornadoes across the Southeastern United States in June 2021, leading to severe damage. The third named storm of the 2021 Atlantic hurricane season, Claudette originated from a broad trough of low pressure over the Bay of Campeche on June 12. The disturbance moved erratically over the region for the next several days, before proceeding northward with little development due to unfavorable upper-level winds and land interaction. Despite this, the National Hurricane Center (NHC) initiated advisories on it as a Potential Tropical Cyclone late on June 17, due to its imminent threat to land. The disturbance finally organized into Tropical Storm Claudette at 00:00 UTC on June 19 just before landfall in southeast Louisiana. Claudette weakened to a depression as it turned east-northeastward before moving through Mississippi, Alabama, Georgia, and South Carolina. Baroclinic forcing then caused Claudette to reintensify into a tropical storm over North Carolina early on June 21 before it accelerated into the Atlantic Ocean later that day. Soon afterward, it degenerated into a low-pressure trough on the same day, before being absorbed into another extratropical cyclone on the next day.

Claudette produced gusty winds, flash flooding, and tornadoes across much of the Southeastern United States. Claudette overall caused minor impacts along the Gulf of Campeche's coastline due to the system stalling in the region as an Invest and a Potential Tropical Cyclone. Impacts were most severe in Alabama and Mississippi, where heavy rains caused flash flooding. Several tornadoes in the states also caused severe damage, including an EF2 tornado that damaged a school and destroyed parts of a mobile home park in East Brewton, Alabama, injuring 20 people. A total of 14 people died in Alabama due to the storm, including 10 from car accidents. Monetary losses across the United States is estimated to be at $375 million.

== Meteorological history ==
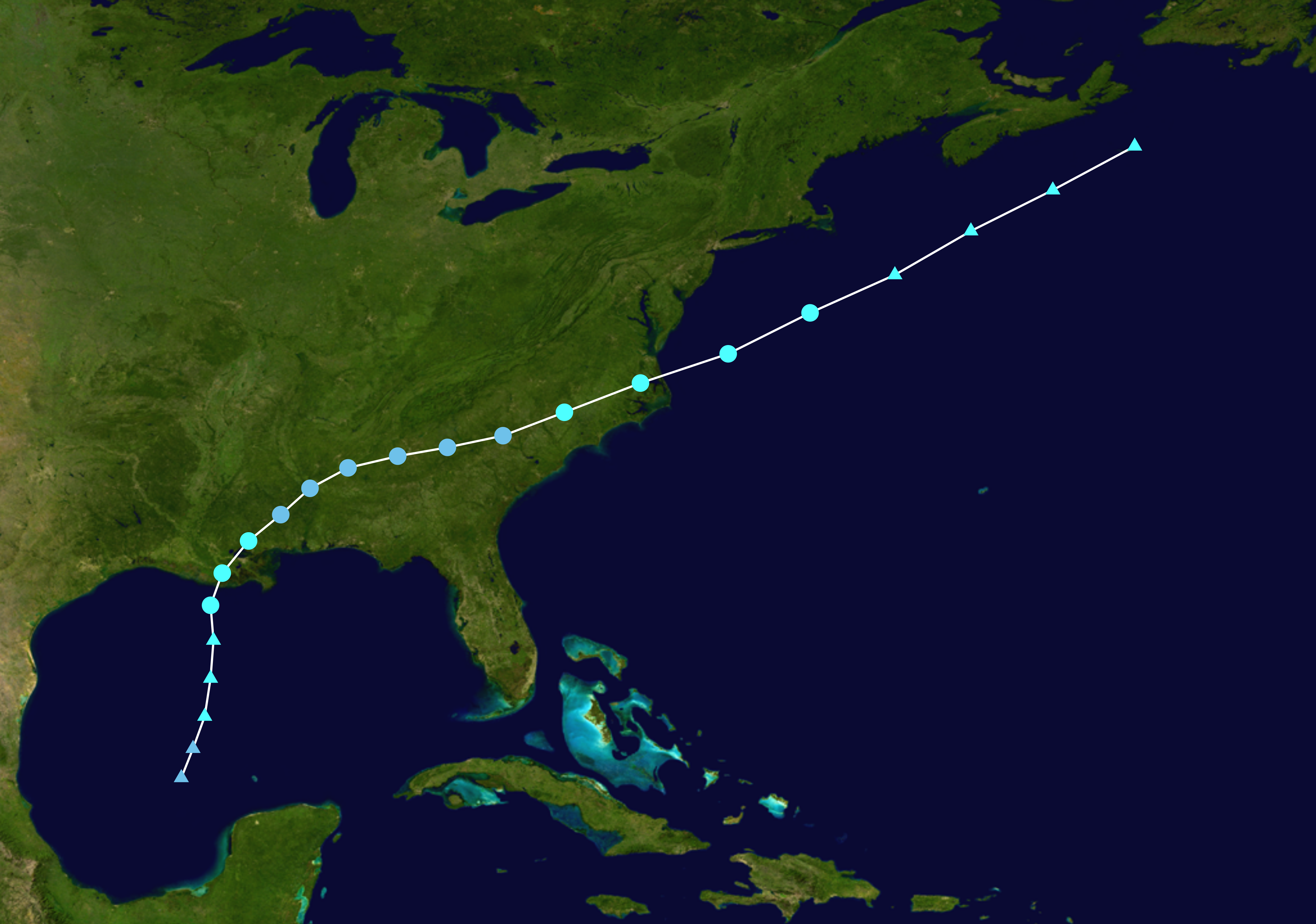
Map plotting the storm's track and intensity, according to the Saffir–Simpson scale Map key Saffir–Simpson scale Tropical depression (≤38 mph, ≤62 km/h) Tropical storm (39–73 mph, 63–118 km/h) Category 1 (74–95 mph, 119–153 km/h) Category 2 (96–110 mph, 154–177 km/h) Category 3 (111–129 mph, 178–208 km/h) Category 4 (130–156 mph, 209–251 km/h) Category 5 (≥157 mph, ≥252 km/h) Unknown Storm type Tropical cyclone Subtropical cyclone Extratropical cyclone, remnant low, tropical disturbance, or monsoon depression

On June 6, a tropical wave entered the Caribbean Sea. The wave briefly became convectively active before moving inland over Nicaragua and Honduras on June 10. The remnants of the system began to interact with the eastern portion of an enhanced monsoon trough in the Eastern Pacific and at 12:00 UTC on June 11, the National Hurricane Center noted the possibility of a trough of low pressure to develop in the upcoming few days over the Bay of Campeche and southwestern Gulf of Mexico. The large disturbance then moved out of the Eastern Pacific into Mexico and 24 hours later, a cluster of convection formed over the Bay of Campeche and parts of Mexico and Central America. Moving erratically over the bight, the system split into two disturbances on either side of Central America, with the southern portion becoming Tropical Storm Dolores. The northern disturbance gained a broad circulation on June 13 and developed an area of low pressure on June 14. After meandering in the Southern Gulf of Mexico for a couple of days, the sprawling, disorganized low began to move north-northeastward. Over the next few days, the structure of the system changed minimally due to unfavorable upper-level winds and land interaction, although convective activity occurred continuously. Organization began to steadily increase east of the circulation, but a Hurricane Hunters reconnaissance aircraft investigated the system on June 17 and did not find a closed surface circulation. However, due to its imminent threat to land, the NHC designated the disturbance as Potential Tropical Cyclone Three at 21:00 UTC that day, and started issuing advisories on it. This designation is given to tropical disturbances that have not acquired tropical cyclone status, but are likely to bring tropical storm-force or higher winds to an area, in this case the Gulf Coast of the United States, and was first used for the precursor to Tropical Storm Bret in 2017. Around this time, convection was increasing and a broad curved banding feature developed on the eastern side of the storm, with the NHC describing its structure more resembled that of a subtropical cyclone. Hurricane Hunters data indicated that the system was rather lopsided, with convective activity being displaced east of the ill-defined center of circulation. This was due to wind shear produced by an upper-level trough over the western shore of the Gulf of Mexico.

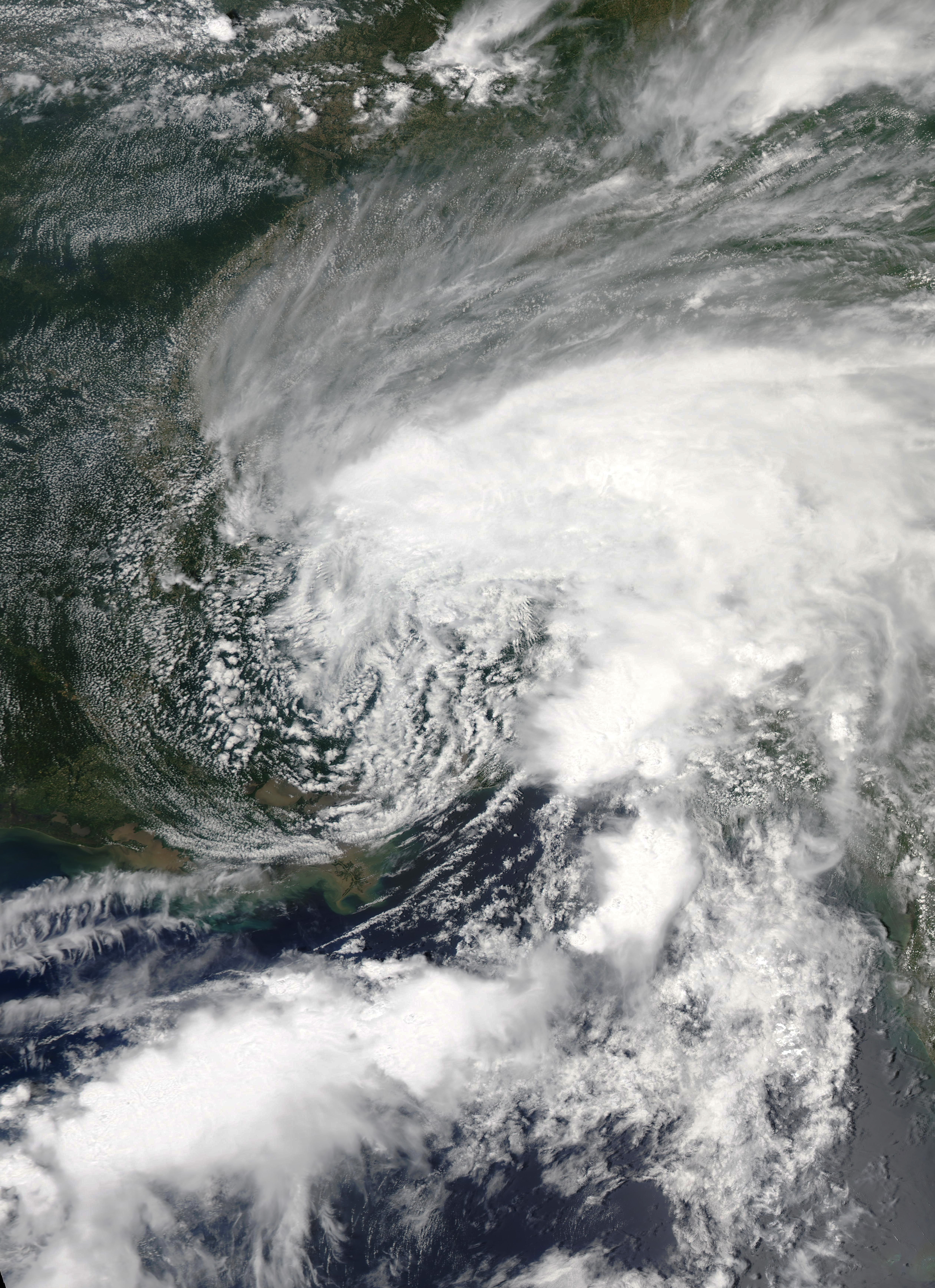
Tropical Storm Claudette over Mississippi on June 19

The next day, the center reformed further north, which increased convection and adding a curvature to the lower-level clouds. A hurricane hunter flight later that day confirmed the circulation had become well-defined and at 00:00 UTC on June 19, the system became a tropical storm as it already had gale-force wind. The storm had some characteristics of a subtropical storm, but was classified as sheared tropical storm since the upper-level trough responsible for its appearance was over Texas and not the storm itself. The system reached its peak intensity with winds of 50 mph (85 km/h) and a pressure of 1009 mb (29.80 inHg) as it made landfall in Terrebonne Parish, Louisiana 25 nm south-southwest of Houma at 04:30 UTC. Operationally, the system was not upgraded to a tropical storm until 09:00 UTC, receiving the name Claudette, by which time it was already inland over southeastern Louisiana and weakening. Turning northeastward, Claudette moved into Southeastern Mississippi and weakened to a depression at 18:00 UTC. After crossing the state line into Alabama, Claudette gradually turned east-northeastward and moved through North Georgia into Upstate South Carolina as a tropical depression. Deep convection increased in curved bands late on June 20, but the center was not well defined. At 06:00 UTC on June 21 however, Claudette restrengthened into a tropical storm while still located over southeastern North Carolina as more organized rainbands formed along and just off the coast. Sustained winds at the time once again reached 50 mph (85 km/h), although its pressure was slightly higher this time. Claudette emerged over the Western Atlantic Ocean later that day as a tropical storm while embedded within a larger low pressure envelope accelerating to east-northeast, as it began its extratropical transition. After moving into the Atlantic Ocean, Claudette moved alongside the coast of the United States and became an extratropical low at 06:00 UTC on June 22. The low continued to move northeastward, before dissipating about 100 nm southeast of the coast of Nova Scotia as it was absorbed into another extratropical storm to the west.

== Preparations ==
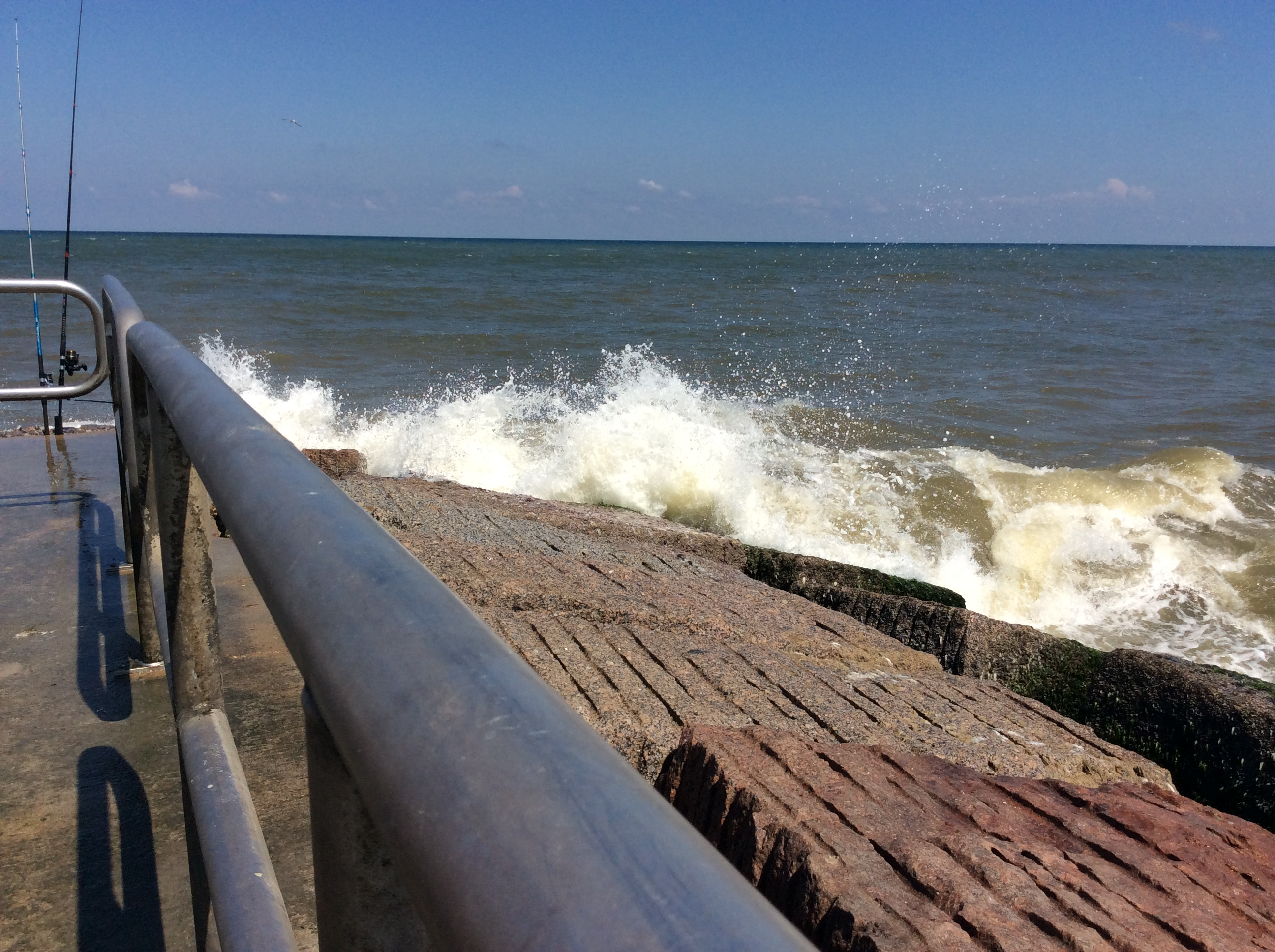
Waves from Claudette crashing against jetties on North Padre Island, Texas

At 21:00 UTC on June 17, a Tropical Storm Warning was issued from Intracoastal City, Louisiana to the Alabama-Florida state line, including the New Orleans Metropolitan Area, Lake Pontchartrain, and Lake Maurepas, upon designation as a potential tropical cyclone. The warning between Morgan City and Intracoastal City was later cancelled at 15:00 UTC on June 18.Flash Flood Watches were also ordered for much of Southeast Louisiana and Mississippi between June 18–20, and also for central and southern Alabama. Coastal flood warnings were also posted from Intracoastal City to the Mississippi-Alabama state line. In anticipation of Claudette, the Storm Prediction Center issued multiple Tornado Watches for southern Louisiana and Alabama, the Florida Panhandle and Georgia as conditions appeared favorable for tornadogenesis and embedded supercells were expected to form in the outer bands of the storm. Louisiana Governor John Bel Edwards issued a state of emergency for the state on June 17, banning price gouging and allowing the distribution of state-provided emergency relief. Sandbag sites were opened in many parishes across Southeast Louisiana. The Chevron Corporation and Occidental Petroleum removed non-essential staff and implemented severe weather protocols on their Gulf of Mexico facilities, some of which are located roughly 150 miles (240 km) offshore Louisiana.

At least 90,000 sandbags were sent to coastal areas in Mississippi by the state emergency management agency, who advised residents to remain vigilant. Several events, including Juneteenth events were cancelled or postponed due to the threat of Three in southern Mississippi, 2021 was the first year Juneteenth was officially a federal holiday. The De Soto National Forest shut down recreation sites near Saucier and river landings along Black Creek. In neighboring Alabama, construction crews had to hastily finish repairs on bulkheads in Fairhope and drainage in Downtown Mobile, the former of which was damaged by Hurricanes Sally and Zeta from the previous year. The Gulf Islands National Seashore in Florida closed down Fort Pickens, issuing a mandatory evacuation for all staff and visitors of the reserve which lasted until noon on June 18. This was due to concerns of high tides pushing sand onto Fort Pickens Road, creating hostile conditions for usage. Despite this, "Opal Beach", the landfall site of Hurricane Opal, and Perdido Key remained open. A total of 5–15 inches of rainfall was forecasted by the NHC on June 19 as Claudette moseyed eastward along the deep south.

At 15:00 UTC on June 19, a Tropical Storm Watch was issued for North Carolina from Cape Fear to Duck. By 09:00 UTC the next day, a Tropical Storm Warning had been ordered from Little River Inlet, South Carolina to Duck. A Tropical Storm Watch also extended from Little River Inlet to the South Santee River in South Carolina. Storm surge of up to 1–3 feet was possible from the North Carolina-Virginia border south to Little River Inlet. Heavy rain and even the potential for isolated tornadoes remained.

== Impact and aftermath ==
=== Mexico and Central America ===
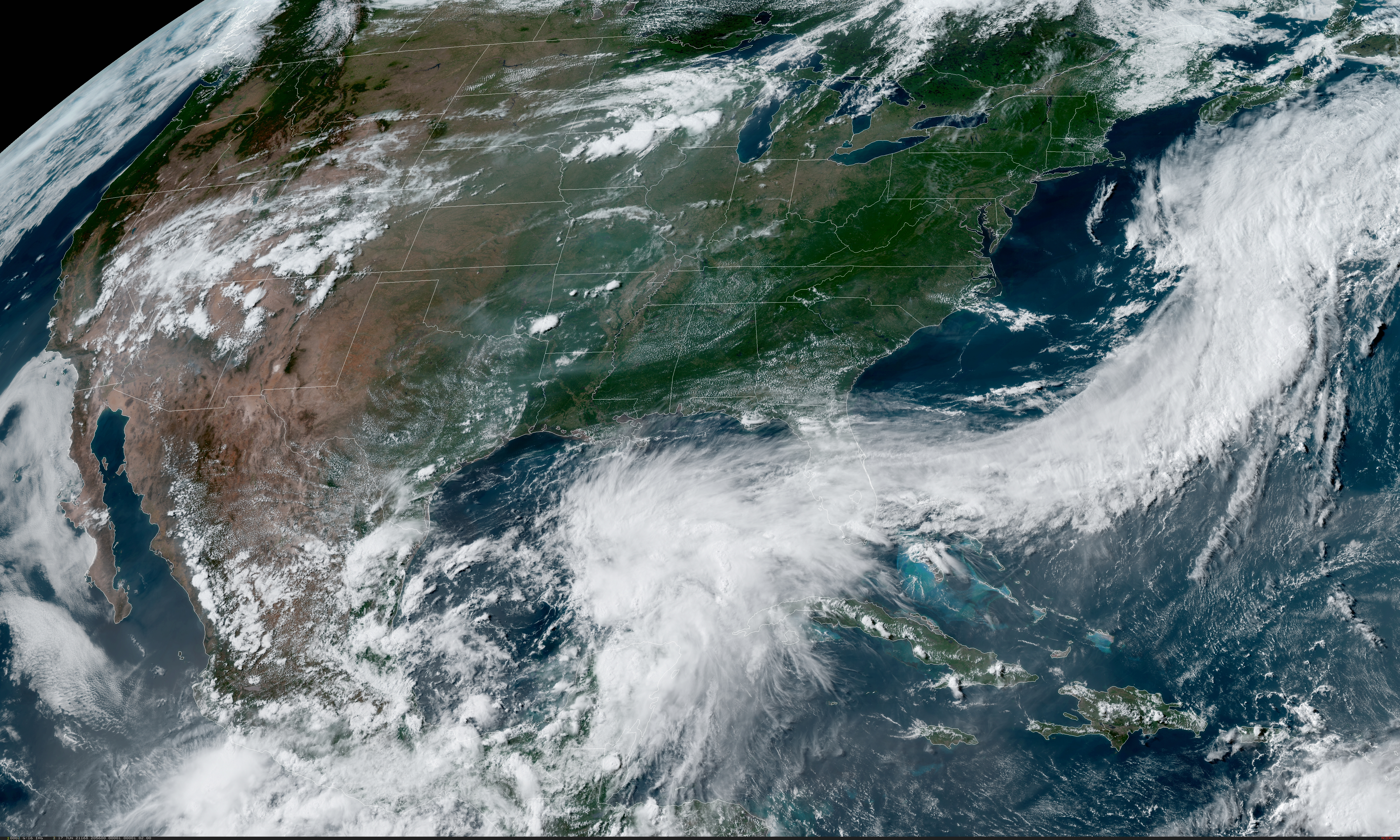
The sprawling precursor to Claudette (center) and Dolores (bottom) on June 17

The Central American Gyre that later spawned Tropical Storms Claudette and Dolores caused torrential rainfall in parts of Central America and Mexico. Flooding began as early as June 11 and continued for nearly a week. Rainfall was particularly intense across Veracruz, Oaxaca, and Puebla. Thirty-three municipalities in Veracruz saw significant effects, with thirteen reporting damage; at least 402 homes were damaged by flooding and landslides across the affected areas. The Isla municipality saw the most damage with 192 homes affected. Several rivers overtopped their banks, inundating surrounding communities. The overflowing Pintores River in Coatepec inundated 105 homes. Sinkholes occurred the city of Veracruz, Cosamaloapan between the Gloria de Coapa and Poblado Dos communities, and in Misantla. The Secretariat of National Defense (SEDNA) deployed personnel in Xalapa to assist in cleanup efforts.

Eight municipalities in Puebla saw minimal damage from the storm, primarily limited to minor flooding and blocked roads. A landslide within the Sierra Norte de Puebla briefly isolated the communities of San Agustín Altiuacan and Tlapehuala. The swollen Balsas River (locally referred to as the Atoyac River) threatened multiple bridges and submerged some homes in the Reforma Sur neighborhood. The Secretary of Civil Protection and Comprehensive Risk Management provided 24 mats and 85 blankets to affected residents in that community. A localized flood in the city of Puebla affected the Museo de la Música Mexicana, the Museo Casa del Títere, and the Casa de la Música de Viena; water reached a depth of 1.6 ft (0.5 m).

The combined influence of low pressure systems in the Gulf of Mexico and off the Pacific coast of Mexico led to prolonged rains in Oaxaca and Chiapas. In Oaxaca, the Chivaniza, Chapala, San Isidro, and Malatengo Rivers topped their banks and affected multiple communities. The Nisa Lubaa stream flooded 15 communities in Ixtepec, affecting more than 300 families. Two shelters were opened in the city. At least ten Zapotec communities were impacted by overflowing streams and rivers, and damage to agriculture and infrastructure. The worst damage in Oaxaca was in the Sierra Sur and Costa regions, where mudslides made roads impassable. Two people were killed by lightning in San Nicolás Yaxe. Two people drowned in Tuxtla Gutiérrez, Chiapas, after getting out of their flooded vehicle and being sucked into a sewer.

Lowland flooding in the Ciénaga 2000 subdivision of Progreso, Yucatán, prompted the evacuation of 40 people some of whom had to be rescued by boat. Two shelters were opened at schools to house displaced persons. The state government provided 500 food packages to the affected residents and five water pumps to clear out standing water. Street flooding occurred in Teapa, Tabasco, with several residences requiring assistance. One home was damaged in Tacotalpa by a landslide. Several days of heavy rain flooded streets in Mexico City. Minor flooding in Quintana Roo disrupted traffic, though overall effects were negligible.

In Guatemala, heavy rains exacerbated the effects of the annual rainy season. One person was killed by a landslide in the Guatemala Department while 55,100 people were affected across the country by rains on June 14–15.

=== United States ===
Tropical Storm Claudette produced light to moderate rainfall across much of the Southeastern United States, with locally heavy accumulations in Alabama, Louisiana, and Mississippi. A total of 14 people died in various incidents related to the storm—4 from direct causes and 10 from indirect causes—all in Alabama. The National Centers for Environmental Information estimated total damage at $375 million. According to AON Benfield, more than 32,500 insurance claims for storm damage were filed across the affected regions.

==== Alabama ====
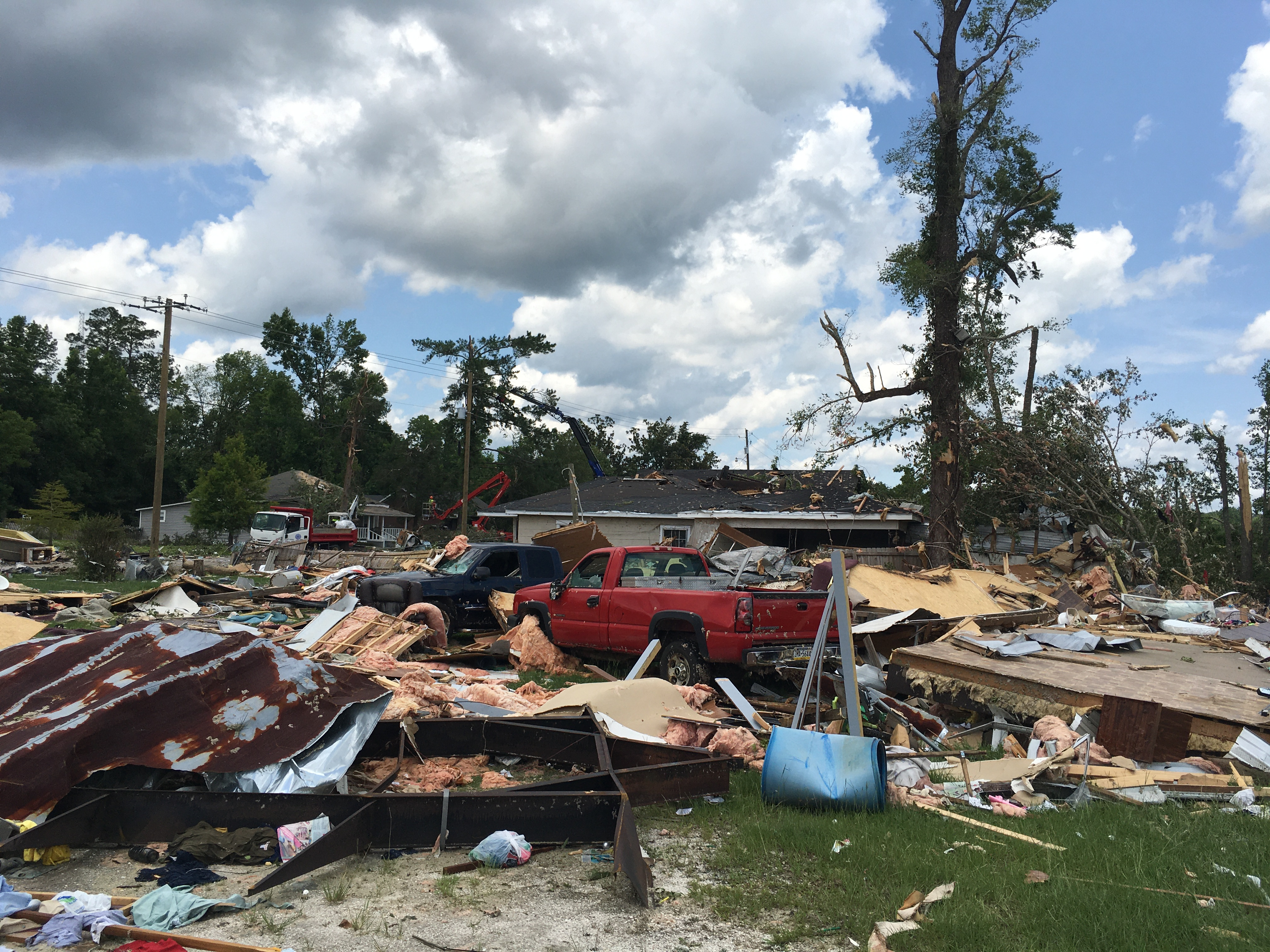
Severe damage caused by an EF2 tornado near East Brewton, Alabama, on June 19

Heavy rainfall and strong thunderstorms affected much of Alabama, with the greatest precipitation occurring along two bands in the northern and southern portions of the state. The highest measured rainfall total was 6.44 in (164 mm) in northeastern Alabama, though meteorologists at the National Weather Service estimated totals may have been locally higher. These rains contributed to the state producing 50 percent more hydroelectric power than expected during the month of June. Flooding occurred along an area from Tuscaloosa to Birmingham to Fort Payne in conjunction with the heaviest rainfall during the overnight of June 19–20. The state's Emergency Management Agency estimated 150–200 homes to be damaged. Search and rescue teams were deployed to search for those who were lost in flash floods, and crews used boats in Pebble Creek to do so. Near Tuscaloosa, a private dam failed and the subsequent flooding washed out a water and sewer main at Nucor Corp.'s steel plant. This in turn damaged the city's sewage system, prompting officials to issue water restrictions for 100,000 people. Flooding in the city damaged or destroyed 45 homes. Damage to the sewer system alone is estimated at $1.5–4 million. Flooding destroyed 5 homes, severely damaged 38, and otherwise impacted a further 53 in Northport and Tuscaloosa collectively. Residential and infrastructure damage between the two cities reached $3.35 million.

The strongest winds occurred in southern and coastal counties, with brief periods of sustained gales reported in Dauphin Island and Fort Morgan. A maximum gust of 49 mph (79 km/h) was measured in Point Clear. Approximately 90,000 Alabama Power customers lost electricity due to downed power lines. Storm surge accompanying the cyclone generally reached 1–3 ft (0.3–0.9 m), with a maxima of 3.67 ft (1.12 m) in Bayou La Batre. Surf heights on top of the surge in Mobile Bay reached 6–12 ft (1.8–3.7 m). Flooding forced the closure of roads in Bayou La Batre, Coden, and The Causeway along US 90. The Dauphin Island fishing pier sustained minor damage. Four tornadoes touched down in the state: two were rated EF0, one was rated EF1 and the other was rated EF2. The EF0 tornadoes caused minimal damage near Florala and the Cedar Point Pier south of Alabama Port where one person was injured by debris. The EF1 tornado, which wasn't discovered until November 2023, caused tree damage north of Johnsonville. The latter of these caused extensive damage along a 22 mi (35 km) path from East Brewton to Castleberry. The tornado damaged or destroyed about 70 buildings and injured 20 people; 2 people sustained serious injuries, one of whom was thrown from his home when it was destroyed.

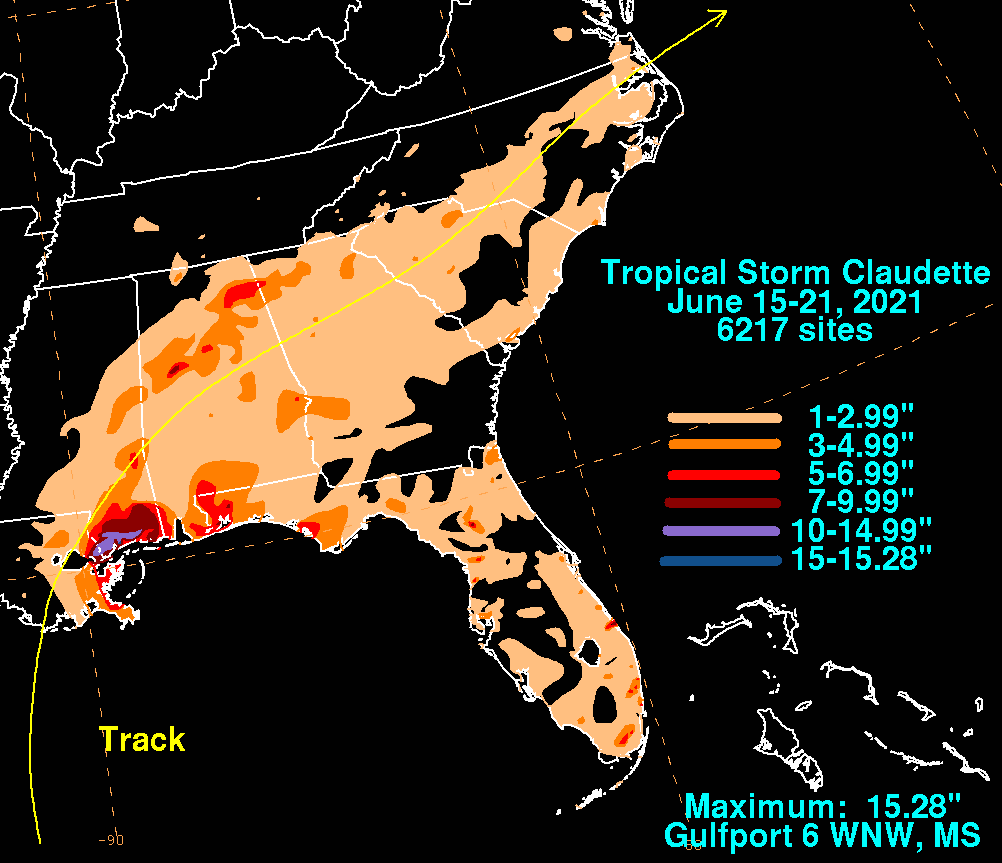
Map of rainfall accumulations from Tropical Storm Claudette across the United States

A total of 14 people died in various incidents related to the cyclone: 10 from car accidents, 2 from fallen trees, and 2 from flooding. Near Cottondale, a 24-year-old man and his 3-year-old son were killed when a tree loosened by saturated soil fell on their home; winds at the time were estimated at 20–30 mph (30–50 km/h). A 31-year-old man died in Birmingham after being swept away by floodwaters and a 23-year-old woman drowned after driving her car into a swollen creek in Fort Payne. The greatest loss of life occurred in a 17-vehicle crash—7 of which caught fire—caused by hydroplaning along I-65 in Butler County; ten people died in the collisions. The Butler County coroner stated the accident occurred along a downhill turn along the highway notorious for hydroplaning incidents. A van carrying nine people to the Tallapoosa County Girls Ranch, a home for abused, neglected, or abandoned girls was involved in the incident. Four residents, two guests, and two of the director's children died in the crash and subsequent fire; the children killed were from ages 3 to 17. The Ranch's director survived and was hospitalized in serious condition. A 29-year-old man and his 9-month-old daughter died in another vehicle involved in the crash.

Alabama Power deployed more than 200 linemen to restore service, as soon as the storm passed. Power was restored to "all customers that could safely accept it" by the evening of June 20. Governor Kay Ivey declared a state of emergency for Baldwin, Butler, Cherokee, DeKalb, Escambia, Mobile, Monroe, and Tuscaloosa counties and declared East Brewton a disaster area, though federal funding would not be available pending an assessment of damage. The Alabama Department of Revenue provided tax relief to residents and businesses the aforementioned counties. In East Brewton, the American Red Cross provided food to victims and local churches provided cleanup supplies. GoFundMe established a hub page for donations relating to Tropical Storm Claudette. The city of Tuscaloosa approved $500,000 in funds for infrastructure repair and a further $750,000 would come from a recently implemented 1 cent sales tax. As of July 6, damage assessments across Alabama did not reach the $7.5 million threshold required for federal disaster assistance. The United States Department of Agriculture provided aid to farmers and ranchers across the state. Without federal aid available, the Government of Escambia County used millions of dollars of its own funds to assist relief efforts from the EF2 tornado.

==== Florida ====
Strong to severe thunderstorms well to the east of Claudette's center produced damaging winds across the western Florida Panhandle. Gusts at Pensacola International Airport peaked at 81 mph (130 km/h), while a gust to 71 mph (114 km/h) was measured over the Santa Rosa Sound. Coastal areas saw brief periods of sustained tropical storm-force winds. Wind damage occurred in parts of the Pensacola metro, particularly in Ferry Pass and Pace. One home had its roof blown off. High surf of 6–12 ft (1.8–3.7 m) flooded beaches and roadways in Escambia and Santa Rosa counties. Rainfall along the Panhandle averaged 3–6 in (76–152 mm), with a peak of 6.2 in (160 mm) in Century, resulting in minor flooding.

==== Elsewhere ====
Claudette produced a modest storm surge in southeastern Louisiana, owing to weaker onshore winds compared to coastal Mississippi, with peak heights generally remaining below 3 ft (0.91 m). A peak inundation of 3.2 ft (0.98 m) was measured in Shell Beach. Salt water flooding remained outside of the New Orleans federal levee system. Claudette's asymmetrical structure led to the strongest winds remaining east of the circulation center and away from Louisiana, despite the core itself crossing the state. Wind generally remained below tropical storm-force, though some areas in Jefferson, Plaquemines, and St. Tammany parishes observed gusts above this threshold. The greatest effects were related to heavy rainfall east of New Orleans in southeastern St. Tammany Parish. There, accumulations averaged 8 to 10 in (200 to 250 mm) with a peak observation of 11.03 in (280 mm) a few miles southeast of Slidell. Flash flooding in and around the community affected about 200 homes, half of which sustained minor damage. Dozens of roads were closed due to high water, with at least 60 vehicles abandoned across the town, and emergency services conducted several high-water rescues. Damage across Slidell was regarded as the worst since Hurricane Katrina in 2005.

Mississippi saw the greatest storm surge along the Gulf Coast, with a peak of 5.9 ft (1.8 m) in Bay St. Louis, which equated to a maximum inundation of 4.4 ft (1.3 m). Elsewhere in the state, surge values averaged 2 to 4 ft (0.61 to 1.22 m). Rainfall was particularly heavy in southern counties, an extension of the rainband that produced the greatest totals in Louisiana. These areas saw more than 10 in (250 mm) of rain, peaking at 15.28 in (388 mm) near Gulfport. Flooding was most severe in Hancock County where approximately 100 homes were affected. High water covered dozens of roads and several people required rescue in Kiln after ignoring barricades. Widespread flooding also occurred in Jackson and Pear River counties; numerous roads were shut down across both counties, two people required rescue in Pascagoula, and cars were stranded in Poplarville. Portions of U.S. Route 90 were rendered impassable in Biloxi and Gulfport. The Biloxi and Wolf rivers saw water reach moderate flood stage. Winds were greatest along coastal areas, with gusts reaching 60 mph (97 km/h) around Gulfport. These winds caused little damage, primarily limited to downed tree branches and some power outages. Four tornadoes touched down in the state, one of which was rated EF1 (the other three were rated EF0), each causing relatively limited damage.

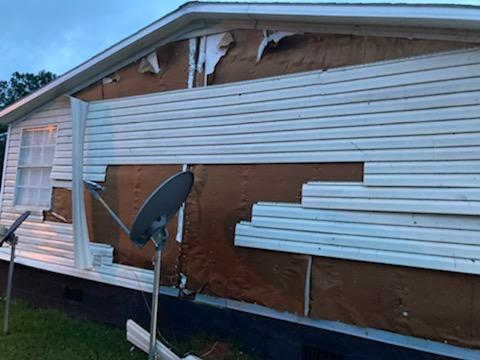
Siding damage to a home from a tornado near Cuthbert, Georgia

Effects from Tropical Depression Claudette in Georgia were largely limited to moderate to heavy rain, with the greatest accumulations centered near the Alabama border. Peak totals of 8 in (200 mm) were estimated in Chattooga County, resulting in localized flash flooding. Multiple roads were flooded in Summerville, including portions of State Routes 27 and 48. Some businesses were inundated and damage in the county was estimated at $75,000. An EF1 tornado caused relatively minor damage, primarily relegated to snapped and uprooted trees, along a 30 mi (48 km) path across rural areas of Early, Clay, and Randolph counties. The rain forced the Atlanta Braves to postpone a game against the Saint Louis Cardinals. Claudette traversed South Carolina as a tropical depression on June 20, bringing modest rainfall to parts of the state. Accumulations were greatest across The Midlands, with totals generally reaching 4 in (100 mm); a peak of 5.71 in (145 mm) was observed in Aiken. Residents in Wagener reported a funnel cloud; however, later surveys by the NWS determined it did not reach the ground. As Claudette reintensified on approach to oceanfall on June 20–21, tropical storm-force winds were observed in eastern coastal communities. Sustained winds at the Isle of Palms pier reached 46 mph (74 km/h) with gusts to 62 mph (100 km/h). Some trees fell onto roadways across the state. Claudette had limited impact in North Carolina, with the most notable damage coming from a weak tornado near Somerset. A negligible storm surge occurred along the Pamlico Sound, peaking at 1.28 ft (0.39 m) in Oregon Inlet; surges along Atlantic-facing coastlines did not exceed 1 ft (0.30 m). Multiple coastal areas saw tropical storm-force winds, with Hatteras Island seeing sustained winds up to 46 mph (74 km/h) while rainfall peaked at 4.1 in (100 mm) near Waxhaw.

Rip currents produced by the storm were felt in the Texas Coastal Bend. Three children were pulled to sea off North Padre Island and were rescued safely. Minor rainfall associated with Claudette was also reported in Tennessee and Virginia. Localized flash flooding occurred in southeastern Virginia, with a portion of Interstate 64 temporarily shut down.

== See also ==
- Weather of 2021
- Tropical cyclones in 2021
- Other storms of the same name
- Tropical Storm Allison (2001) – Also led to a severe weather in the Southern United States in June 2001
- Tropical Storm Matthew (2004) – A storm that formed in the Gulf of Mexico and hit Louisiana
- Tropical Storm Cindy (2017) – Also a rather lopsided system that affected the Gulf Coast of the United States in June 2017
- Hurricane Barry (2019) – Similarly disorganized Atlantic hurricane which impacted similar areas and caused tornadoes in July 2019
- Tropical Storm Cristobal (2020) – Storm that had a similar track and affected similar areas in June 2020
