= Surl =

Surl or Surls may refer to:

- James Surls (born 1943, American modernist artist
- Martin Surl, British public servant
- Surl, North Carolina
