= White Rock Township, Illinois =

White Rock Township
- Township
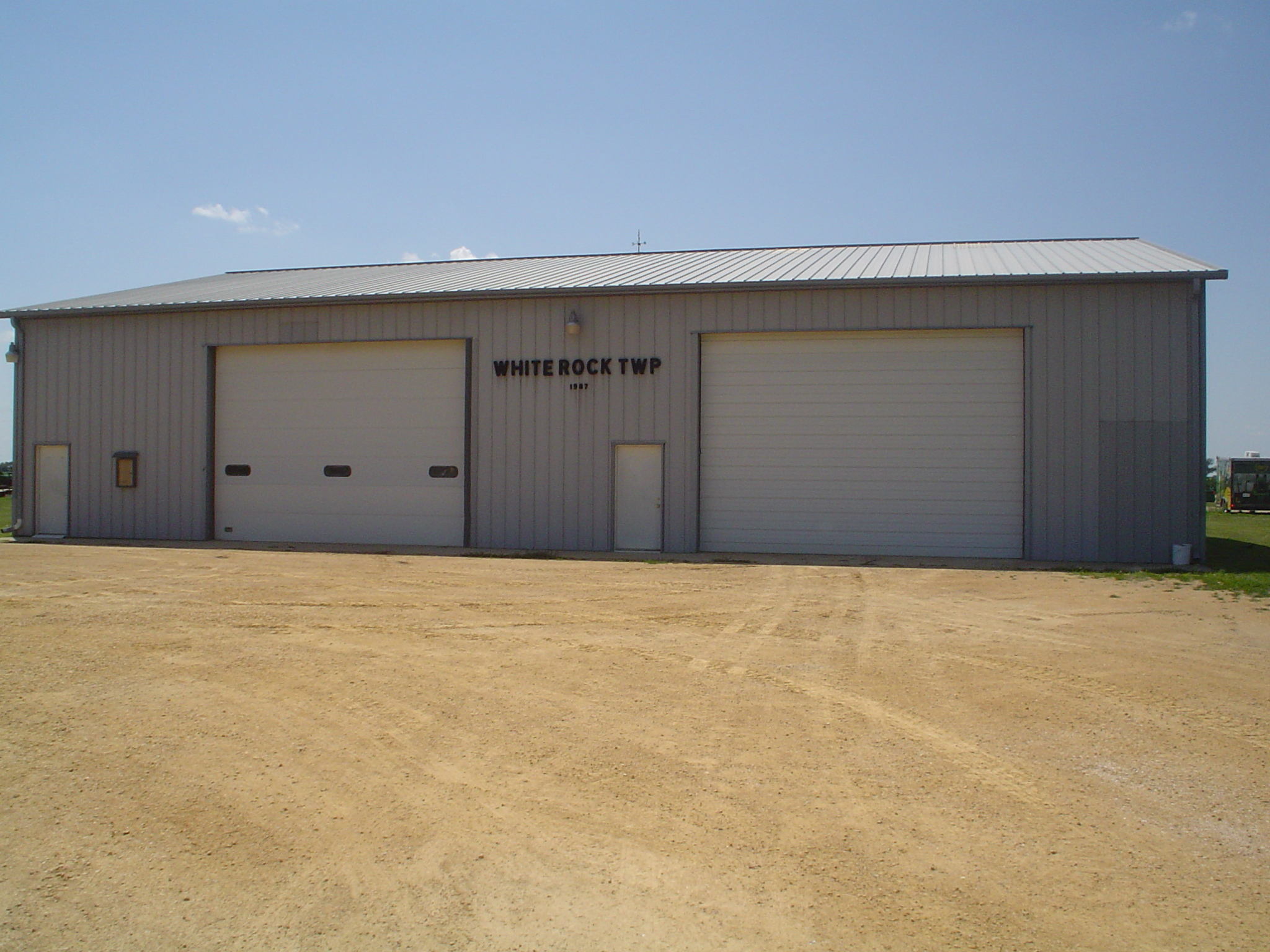
- White Rock Township building located in Kings.

- Location within Ogle County Location within Illinois Location within the United States
- Coordinates: 42°00′49″N 89°06′34″W
- Country: United States
- State: Illinois
- County: Ogle
- Organized: November 6, 1849

Government
  - Mayor: John Greenfield

Area
  - Total: 35.56 sq mi (92.1 km^{2})
  - Land: 35.54 sq mi (92.0 km^{2})
  - Water: 0.03 sq mi (0.078 km^{2})
- Elevation: 574 ft (175 m)

Population (2010)
  - Estimate (2016): 710
  - Density: 20.8/sq mi (8.0/km^{2})
- Time zone: UTC-6 (CST)
  - Summer (DST): UTC-5 (CDT)
- FIPS code: 17-141-81399

White Rock Township is located in Ogle County, Illinois, United States. As of the 2010 census, its population was 738 and it contained 298 housing units. It contains the census-designated place of Kings.

== Geography ==
The unincorporated community of White Rock is located in the township.

According to the 2010 census, the township has a total area of 35.56 square miles (92.1 km^{2}), of which 35.54 square miles (92.0 km^{2}) (or 99.94%) is land and 0.03 square miles (0.078 km^{2}) (or 0.08%) is water.

== Demographics ==
Historical population
| Census | Pop. | Note | %± |
|---|---|---|---|
| 2016 (est.) | 710 |
U.S. Decennial Census
