= Greenfield (surname) =

Greenfield is an English surname. Notable people with the surname include:

- Adam Greenfield (born 1968), American writer
- Albert M. Greenfield (1887–1967), American businessman and philanthropist
- Sir Cornelius Greenfield (born 1909), Rhodesian civil servant
- Dave Greenfield (1949–2020), English keyboardist, singer and songwriter
- David G. Greenfield (born 1978), American politician, law professor and non-profit executive
- Edward Greenfield (1928–2015), English music critic and broadcaster
- Elizabeth Greenfield (1809–1876), African American singer
- Eloise Greenfield (1929–2021), American children's book and biography author and poet
- Ernest Greenfield, British archaeologist
- Garret Greenfield (born 1999), American football player
- Hana Greenfield (1926–2014), Czechoslovak-born Holocaust survivor and Israeli writer
- Herbert Greenfield (1869–1949), Canadian politician
- Howard Greenfield (1936–1986), American songwriter
- James L. Greenfield (1924–2024), American journalist and government official
- Jeff Greenfield (born 1943), American television journalist and author
- Isca Greenfield-Sanders (born 1978), American artist
- Jerry Greenfield (born 1951), American entrepreneur
- John Greenfield (or Groenveldt) (1647?–1710?), Dutch physician and surgeon
- Joseph Godwin Greenfield (1884–1958) Scottish neuropathologist
- Julia Greenfield, American politician
- Julian Greenfield (1907–1993), South Rhodesian politician and judge
- Lauren Greenfield (born 1966), American documentary photographer
- Lee Greenfield (1941–2023), American politician
- Luke Greenfield (born 1972), American film director
- Mandy Greenfield, American artistic director
- Martin Greenfield (1928–2024), American tailor
- Matt Greenfield (born 1965), American producer and scriptwriter
- Matthew Greenfield (born 1979), American film producer
- Max Greenfield (born 1979), American actor
- Meg Greenfield (1930–1999), American journalist
- Michael Greenfield (racing driver) (born 1963), American racing driver
- Michael Greenfield (rugby league) (born 1985), Australian National Rugby League player
- Murray Greenfield (1926–2024), American-born Israeli writer and publisher
- Robby Greenfield, American businessman, activist, philanthropist and athlete
- Robert Greenfield (born 1946), American writer
- Ruth W. Greenfield (1923–2023), American musician and teacher
- Susan Greenfield (born 1950), British scientist
- Theresa Greenfield (born 1963), American politician
- Thomas B. Greenfield (1930–1992), Canadian scholar and theorist of educational administration
- Timothy Greenfield-Sanders (born 1952), American documentary filmmaker and photographer
- Tzvia Greenfield (born 1945), Israeli politician
- Veronica Greenfield a.k.a. Ronnie Spector (1946–2022), American singer
- William Greenfield (died 1315), the Lord Chancellor of England and the Archbishop of York
