= Skyler Gill-Howard =

American football player (born 2002)

No. 50 – Detroit Lions
- Position: Defensive tackle / Tight end
- Roster status: Active

Personal information
- Born: October 13, 2002 (age 24); Milwaukee, Wisconsin, U.S.
- Listed height: 6 ft 1 in (1.85 m)
- Listed weight: 280 lb (127 kg)

Career information
- High school: Greenfield (Greenfield, Wisconsin)
- College: Upper Iowa (2021); Northern Illinois (2022–2024); Texas Tech (2025)
- NFL draft: 2026: 6th round, 205th overall pick

Career history
- Detroit Lions (2026–present)

Awards and highlights
- Third-team All-MAC (2024)

Career NFL statistics as of Week 4, 2026
- Tackles: 6
- Sacks: 0.5
- Stats at Pro Football Reference

Skyler Gill-Howard (born October 13, 2002) is an American professional football defensive tackle and tight end for the Detroit Lions of the National Football League (NFL). He played college football for the Upper Iowa Peacocks, Northern Illinois Huskies, and Texas Tech Red Raiders. Gill-Howard was selected by the Lions in the sixth round of the 2026 NFL Draft.

== Early life ==
Gill-Howard attended Greenfield High School in Greenfield, Wisconsin, and committed to play college football at Upper Iowa.

== College career ==
Throughout his four-year college career from 2022 through 2025, Gill-Howard totaled 88 tackles with 14.5 going for a loss, six and a half sacks, and an interception. As a senior at Texas Tech in 2025, Gill-Howard impressed starting alongside a defensive line that included players David Bailey, Lee Hunter, and Romello Height before an ankle injury ended his season week 7 against the Kansas Jayhawks. On January 23, 2026, Gill-Howard declared for the 2026 NFL draft.

== Professional career ==
Pre-draft measurables
Height	Weight	Arm length	Hand span	Wingspan	40-yard dash	10-yard split	20-yard split	20-yard shuttle	Vertical jump	Broad jump	Bench press
6 ft 0 5/8 in (1.84 m)	280 lb (127 kg)	30 3/4 in (0.78 m)	9 1/4 in (0.23 m)	6 ft 4 3/8 in (1.94 m)	5.07 s	1.80 s	2.89 s	4.73 s	30.5 in (0.77 m)	9 ft 0 in (2.74 m)	27 reps
All values from NFL Combine/Pro Day

Gill-Howard was selected by the Detroit Lions with the 205th overall pick in the sixth round of the draft.
