= Greenfield Plantation =

Historic house in North Carolina, United States

- U.S. National Register of Historic Places
- Location within North Carolina Location within the United States
- Location: E of Edenton on SR 1109, near Somerset, North Carolina
- Coordinates: 36°3′13″N 76°26′33″W
- Area: 9 acres (3.6 ha)
- Built: 1752, c. 1840
- Architectural style: Greek Revival, Georgian
- NRHP reference No.: 76001316
- Added to NRHP: May 6, 1976

Greenfield Plantation is a historic plantation house located near Somer, near Edenton, Chowan County, North Carolina. It was built about 1752, and is a two-story, five-bay-by-two-bay, T-shaped Georgian-style frame dwelling. It features a full-width, double porch. The interior was remodeled in the Greek Revival-style about 1840. It was listed on the National Register of Historic Places in 1976 as a privately owned residence.

The plantation is one of twenty six places located in Chowan County that are on the National Register of Historic Places. It is located on the north shore of the Albemarle Sound, 14 miles east of Edenton. The owner of the plantation on the nomination form for the National Register of Historic Places is listed as being Thomas Benbury Wood and the building was nominated due to its architectural significance.

In the mid nineteenth century Greenfield Plantation was owned by businessman Edward Wood, who purchased the property from Richard Benbury Creecy. Some of the 1,934 acres was used for agriculture (wheat, oats and corn) and farming (cattle, sheep and pigs) and a fishery was established. Edward's other business interests included a sawmill, another fishery and a steam mill. In 1860 he is listed as being the owner of 46 enslaved people.

Greenfield Plantation is associated with Hayes Plantation, as both were owned by Edward Wood, after he inherited Hayes Plantation from James Cathcart Johnston, a descendant of Samuel Johnston. A collection known as the Hayes Collection is held by the University of North Carolina with artefacts from the Johnston and Wood families.

The owner prior to Edward Wood, Richard Benbury Creecy was born at Greenfield Plantation and purchased his siblings stake in the property in 1837. He later became a newspaper editor.
