= Kings, Ogle County, Illinois =

Kings
- Unincorporated community
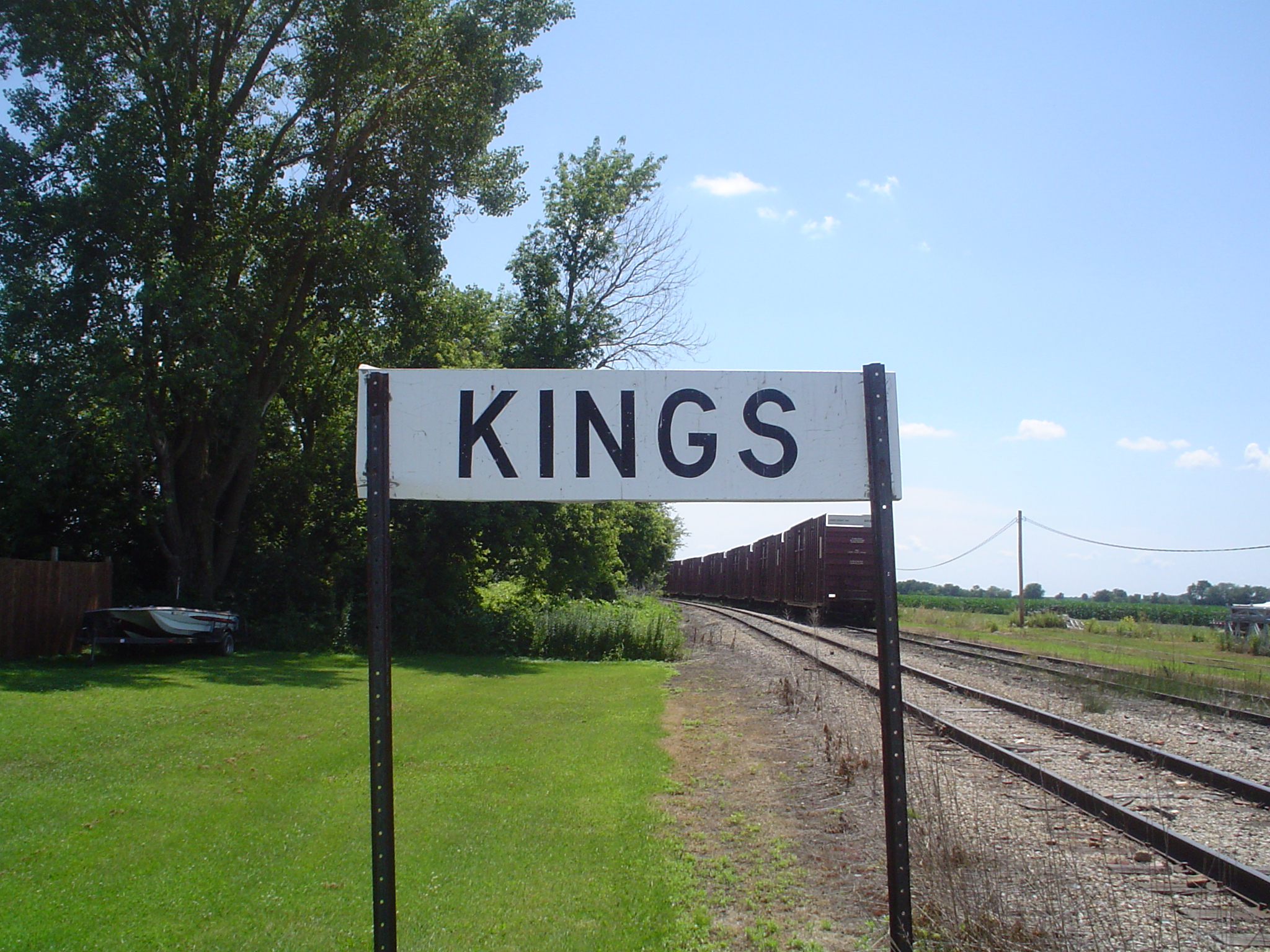
- Sign along the railroad tracks for Kings

- Location within Ogle County Kings (Illinois)
- Coordinates: 42°00′04″N 89°06′24″W
- Country: United States
- State: Illinois
- County: Ogle
- Township: White Rock

Area
  - Total: 0.15 sq mi (0.40 km^{2})
  - Land: 0.15 sq mi (0.40 km^{2})
  - Water: 0 sq mi (0.00 km^{2})
- Elevation: 886 ft (270 m)

Population (2020)
  - Total: 146
  - Density: 953.1/sq mi (368.01/km^{2})
- Time zone: UTC-6 (CST)
  - Summer (DST): UTC-5 (CDT)
- ZIP Code: 61045
- Area code: 815
- FIPS code: 17-39987
- GNIS feature ID: 2806509

Kings is an unincorporated community in Ogle County, Illinois, United States, northwest of Rochelle.

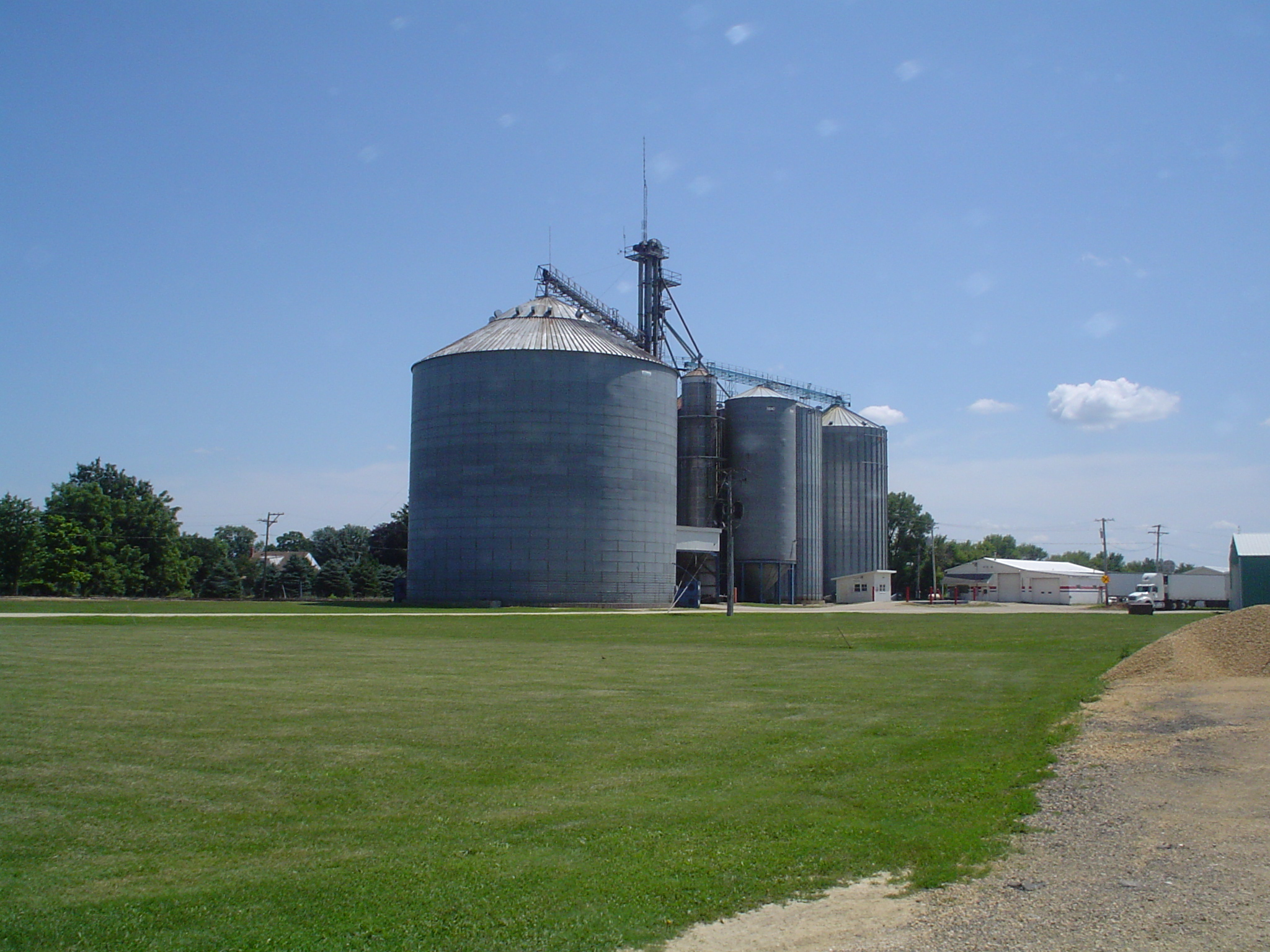
Large grain elevator in Kings

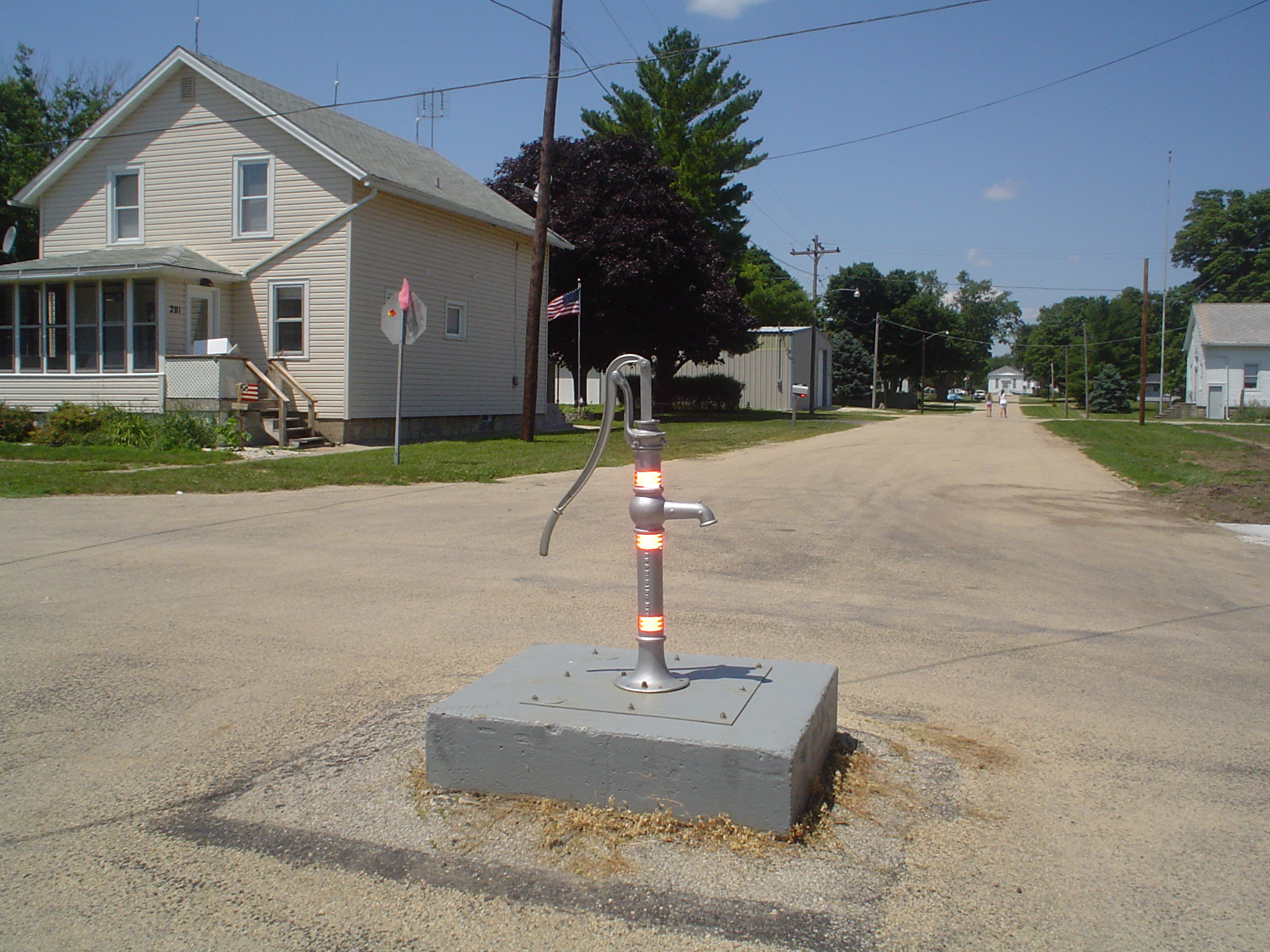
Site of the old town well in Kings

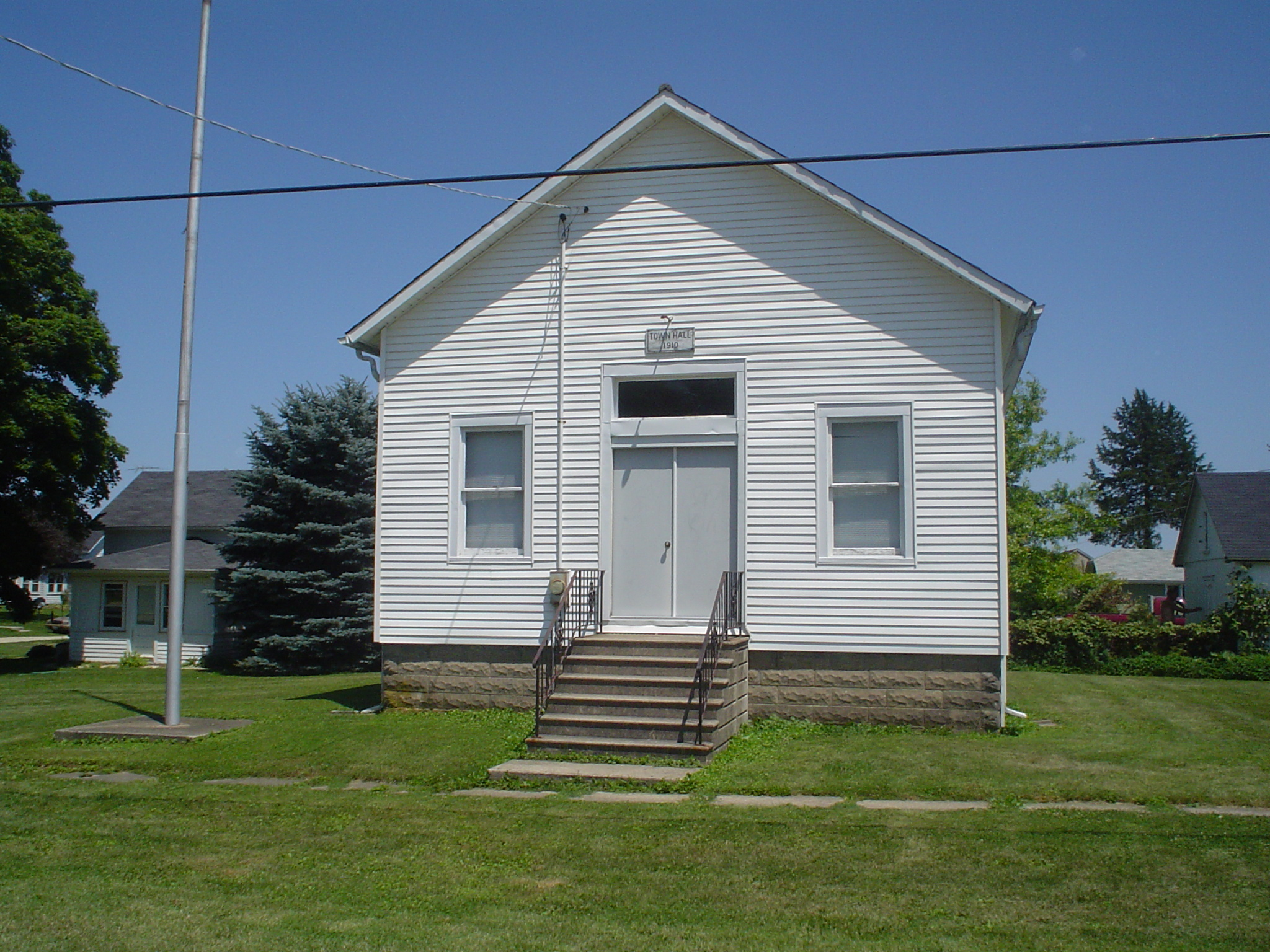
Town Hall built in 1910 in Kings

== Demographics ==
Historical population
Census	Pop.	Note	%±
2020	146		—
U.S. Decennial Census

Kings first appeared as a census designated place in the 2020 U.S. census.

== Education ==
It is in the Kings Consolidated School District 144 and the Rochelle Township High School District 212.
