= Greenfield High School (Missouri) =

Location
- 418 College Street; Greenfield, Missouri 65661; United States; 37°24′58″N 93°50′35″W

Information
- Type: Public
- School district: Greenfield School District
- Principal: Jeff Davis
- Staff: 17.70 (FTE)
- Grades: 7–12
- Student to teacher ratio: 8.87
- Colors: Blue and white
- Mascot: Wildcat
- Website: www.greenfieldr4.org/o/greenfield-jr-and-sr-high

Greenfield High School is a public high school in Greenfield, Missouri, United States.
