= Washington Hotel (Greenfield, Missouri) =

Historic building

- U.S. National Register of Historic Places
- Location within Missouri Location within the United States
- Location: 2 S. Main St., Greenfield, Missouri
- Coordinates: 37°24′56″N 93°50′24″W
- Area: less than one acre
- Built: 1882, 1900-1910
- Built by: Long, Arch M.
- Architectural style: Italianate, Commercial block
- NRHP reference No.: 02001178
- Added to NRHP: October 16, 2002

Washington Hotel, also known as Washington House, is a historic hotel building located at Greenfield, Dade County, Missouri. It was built in 1882 and expanded between 1900 and 1910, and is a 2 1/2-story, painted brick building with modest Italianate style detailing. It consists of a central block with flanking wings. It sits on a raised basement and has a low-pitched hipped roof with dormers. The hotel closed in the late-1960s. It was later destroyed.

It was listed on the National Register of Historic Places in 2002.
