= Greenfield Opera House Building =

- U.S. National Register of Historic Places
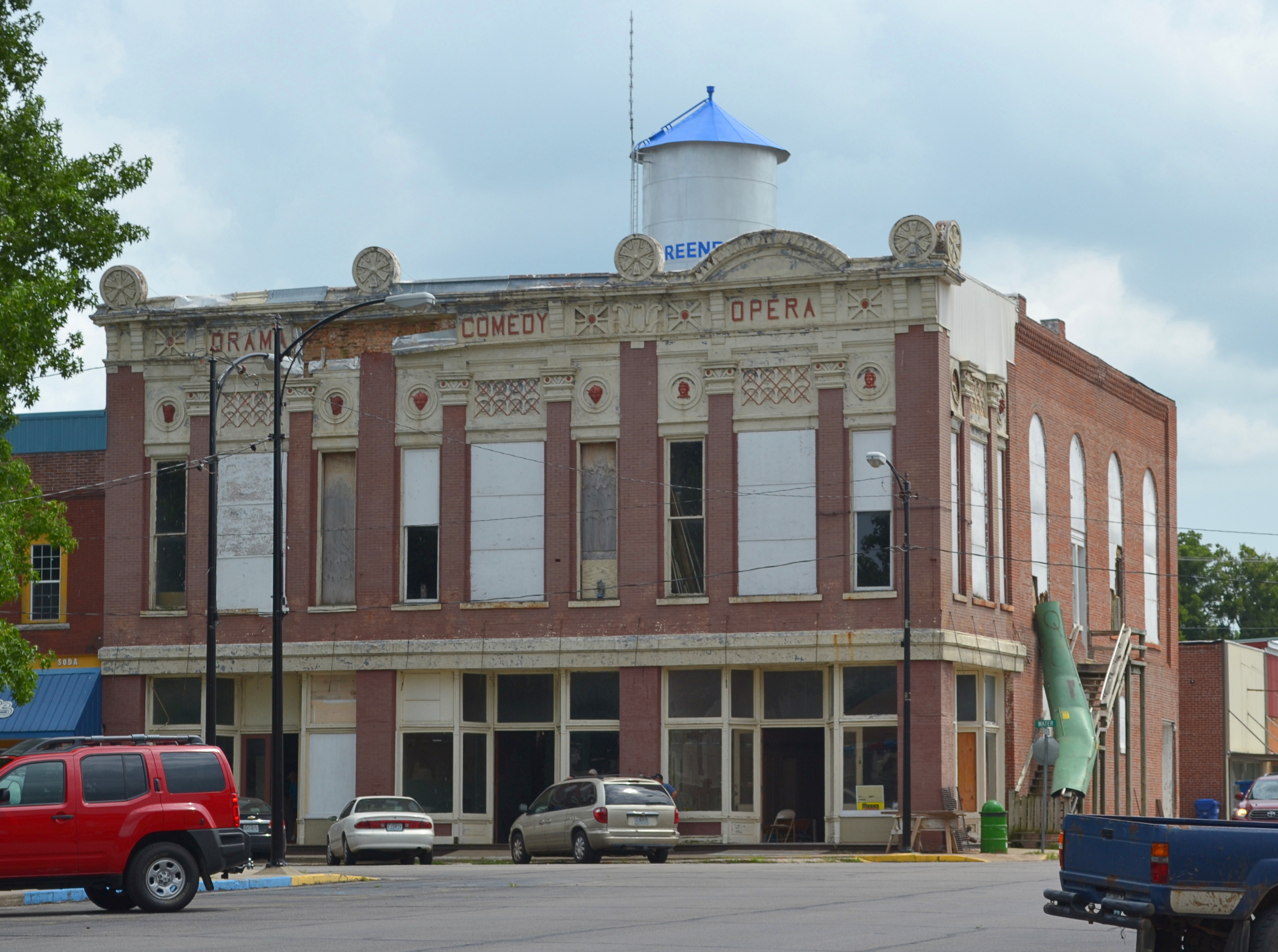
- Greenfield Opera House Building, July 2015

- Location within Missouri Location within the United States
- Location: Jct. of Water and Allison Sts., Greenfield, Missouri
- Coordinates: 37°24′53″N 93°50′27″W
- Area: less than one acre
- Built: 1887-1888
- Built by: McReynolds. W.B. & Griggs. L.J.
- Architect: Foley, W.E.
- Architectural style: Late Victorian
- NRHP reference No.: 98001504
- Added to NRHP: December 10, 1998

Greenfield Opera House Building, also known as Greenfield Opry House, is a historic opera house building located at Greenfield, Dade County, Missouri. It was built in 1887–1888, and is a three-story, rectangular, Late Victorian style red brick building. It measures 67 feet by 84 feet and features a pressed metal and cast iron ornamented facade. It has three storefronts on the first floor and opera house on the second and part of the third floors.

It was listed on the National Register of Historic Places in 1998.
