= Moriah, North Carolina =

Unincorporated community in North Carolina, US

Coordinates: 36°15′28″N 078°49′46″W

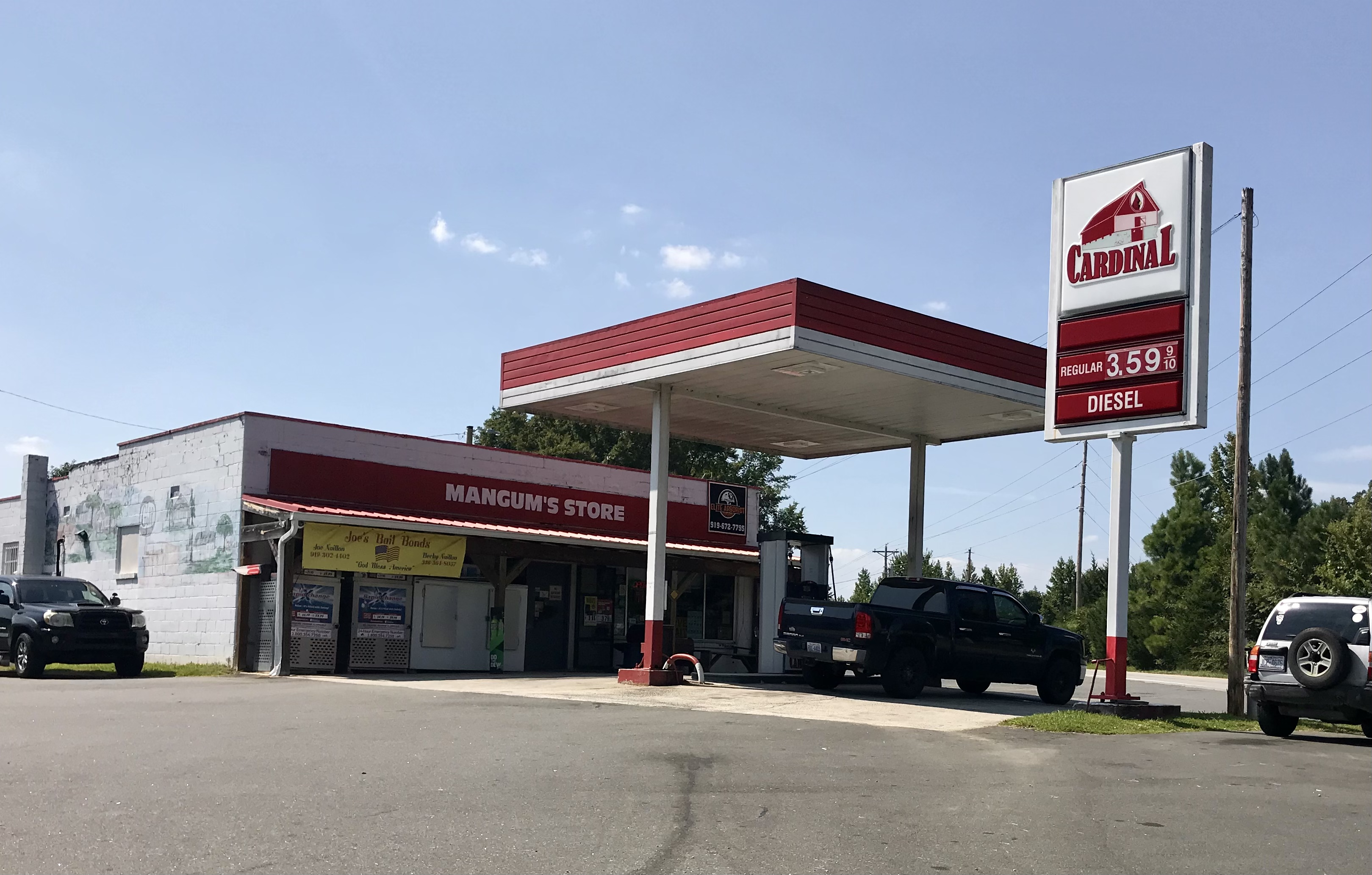
Mangum's Store in Moriah

Moriah is an unincorporated community in southeastern Person County, North Carolina, United States, south of Surl, and east-southeast of Timberlake.
