= White Rock, Illinois =

- Unincorporated community
- Location within Illinois Location within the United States
- Coordinates: 42°02′11″N 89°08′02″W
- Country: United States
- State: Illinois
- County: Ogle
- Elevation: 820 ft (250 m)
- Time zone: UTC-6 (Central (CST))
  - Summer (DST): UTC-5 (CDT)
- Area codes: 815 & 779
- GNIS feature ID: 421066

White Rock is an unincorporated community in White Rock Township, Ogle County, Illinois, United States, located 5 miles (8.0 km) south-southwest of Davis Junction.
