= Greenfield, Mississippi County, Missouri =

Extinct hamlet in Missouri, U.S.

Coordinates: 36°57′54″N 89°10′18″W

Greenfield is an extinct town in Mississippi County, in the U.S. state of Missouri. The GNIS classifies it as a populated place.

A variant name was "Birdville". A post office called Birdsville was established in 1854, and remained in operation until 1873. The name Greenfield later was applied to the community on account of the greenery of the town site.
