= Greenfield High School (Wisconsin) =

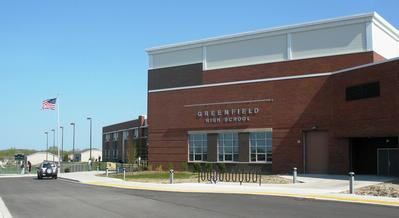
- Greenfield High School in 2009

Location
- 4800 South 60th Street; Greenfield, Wisconsin 53220; United States
- Coordinates: 42°57′23″N 87°59′19″W

Information
- Type: Public secondary school
- Motto: Respect...Live it!
- Established: September 12, 1958 (Note: Greenfield High School operated while under construction for the 1958–59 academic year. The school was officially dedicated on June 14, 1959.)
- School district: Greenfield School District
- NCES District ID: 5505940
- Superintendent: Lisa Elliott
- Principal: Todd Willems
- Teaching staff: 79.50 (on an FTE basis)
- Grades: 9–12
- Enrollment: 1,127 (2023–2024)
- Student to teacher ratio: 14.18
- Campus size: 47 acres
- Colors: Green and gold (Note: The exact colors are forest green and Vegas gold.)
- Athletics conference: Woodland Conference
- Team name: Hustlin' Hawks
- Rival: Whitnall High School
- Accreditation: Cognia
- Yearbook: Spectrum
- Website: www.greenfield.k12.wi.us/schools/high/

Greenfield High School (GHS) is a public high school in Greenfield, Wisconsin. It serves grades 9-12 for the Greenfield School District.

== History ==
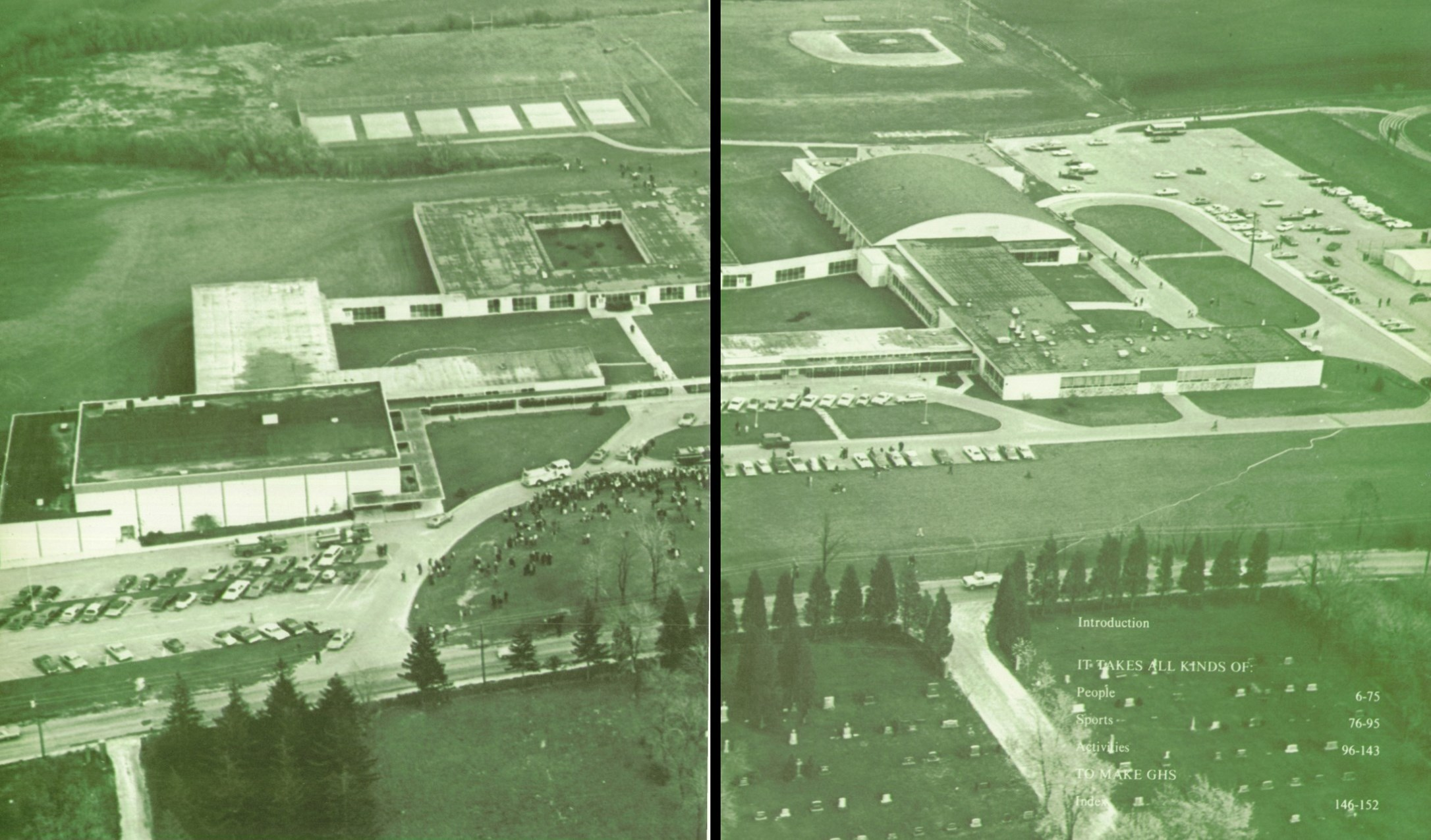
The Greenfield High School campus in 1972

Construction began on the original Greenfield High School on December 16, 1957, shortly after the City of Greenfield was incorporated. The 47-acre site on the corner of Layton Avenue and South 60th Street was purchased for $65,000. Though construction continued, it opened for the first day of school September 12, 1958 with an assembly in the unfinished cafeteria. The school was officially dedicated on June 14, 1959.

=== Boucher v. School Board of Greenfield ===
In 1997, an article circulated in an underground student newspaper including lay instructions on how to bypass security measures on GHS computers. After administrators identified the author as student Justin Boucher, he was unanimously expelled by the school board for one year.

Represented by the American Civil Liberties Union (ACLU), Boucher sued on First Amendment grounds and on September 19 was granted a preliminary injunction against his expulsion by a U.S. district court judge. Although a costly investigation did not tie any computer damage to Boucher or his article, Greenfield superintendent Bill Larkin argued that the article "allowed information to students that could have destroyed the computer system" and the school district filed their appeal on September 22.

In 1998, the United States Court of Appeals for the Seventh Circuit sided with the school board, stating that "outlin[ing] procedures for accessing restricted information, which could lead to tampering with that information, and potential damage to the school’s computer network," was not protected speech under the First Amendment. The court also rejected that the article was off-campus speech, because although Boucher prepared it at home, he had intended it for publication in the underground newspaper which is distributed on school grounds.

=== 2007–2010 expansions ===
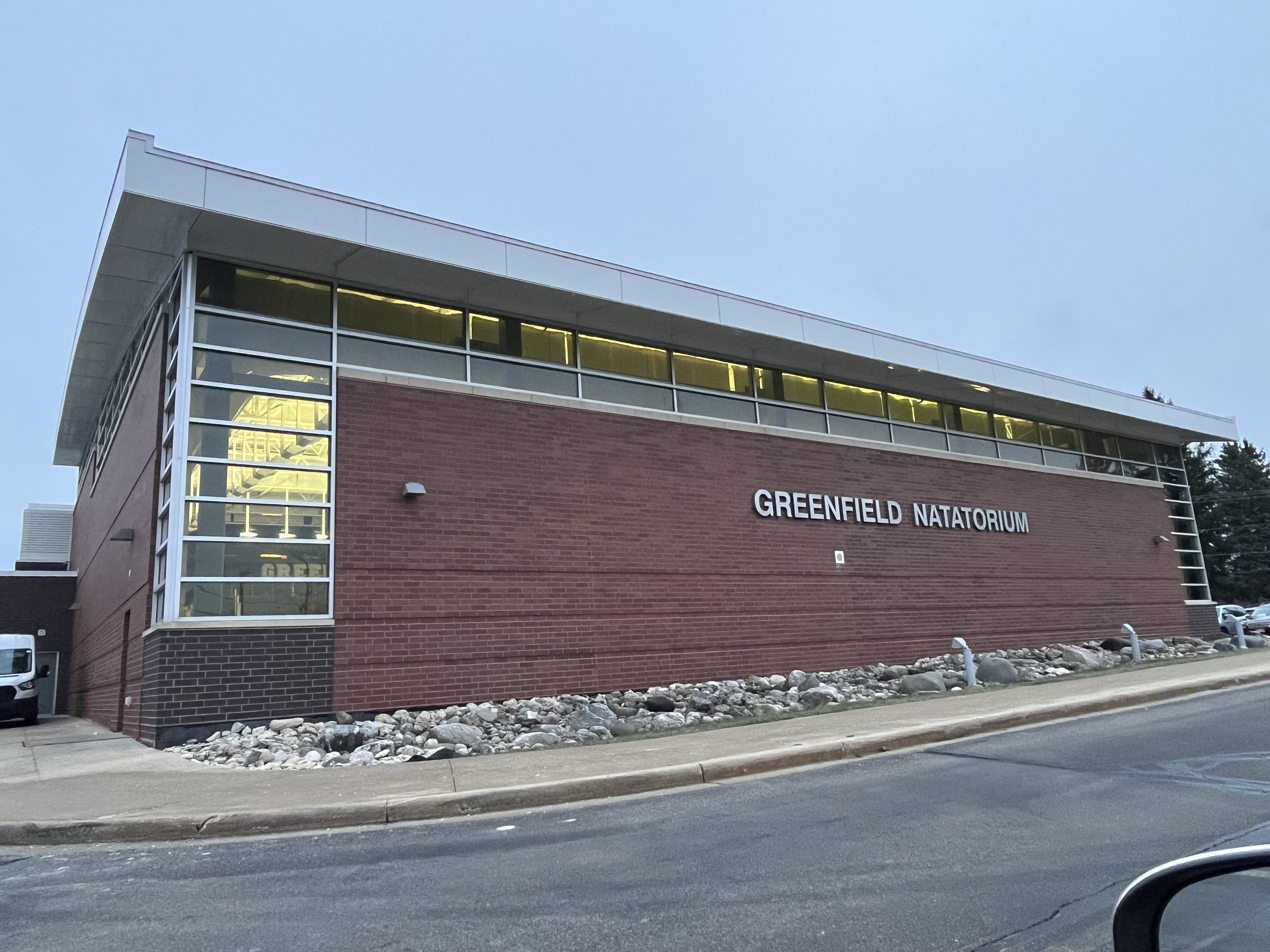
The swimming pool facility approved in 2008 and opened in 2010

In February 2007, referendums issuing $37.8 million to renovate the high school and $4.35 million to construct a new auditorium were authorized by voters. An additional referendum, allotting $6 million for a new swimming pool, was also approved in April 2008.

Other additions to the school included a second gym complete with new locker rooms and a fitness center, a new two-story academic wing, a concession stand, and a new street entrance. The cafeteria was also completely remodeled.

Construction continued while the school was in use, and was completed when the natatorium had its ribbon cutting in January 2010.

=== Recent history ===
In late 2019, the school district evaluated and emphasized their work on anti-bullying and suicide prevention after two student suicides occurred within six weeks.

In June 2021, 191 GHS students published a book about their experiences since the onset of the COVID-19 pandemic. The book is a collection of vignettes contributed by each student. The authors were of the sophomore class, whose freshman year was interrupted by COVID-19 lockdowns.

== Academics ==
Greenfield is accredited by Cognia.

In 2012, the school board announced an experiment whereby class schedules would include a 25-minute period for students to get extra help from teachers on an as-needed basis.

== Athletics ==
Greenfield's Hustlin' Hawks are members of the Woodland Conference. School colors are forest green and Vegas gold. The following Wisconsin Interscholastic Athletic Association (WIAA) sports are offered:

- Baseball (boys)
- Basketball (girls and boys)
- Cross country (girls and boys)
- Football (boys)
- Golf (boys)
- Soccer (girls and boys)
- Softball (girls)
- Swimming and diving (girls and boys)
- Tennis (girls and boys)
- Track and field (girls and boys)
- Volleyball (girls and boys)
- Wrestling (boys)

=== Conference affiliation history ===
- Braveland Conference (1961-1963)
- Parkland Conference (1963-1985)
- Suburban Park Conference (1985-1993)
- Woodland Conference (1993–present)

== Notable alumni ==
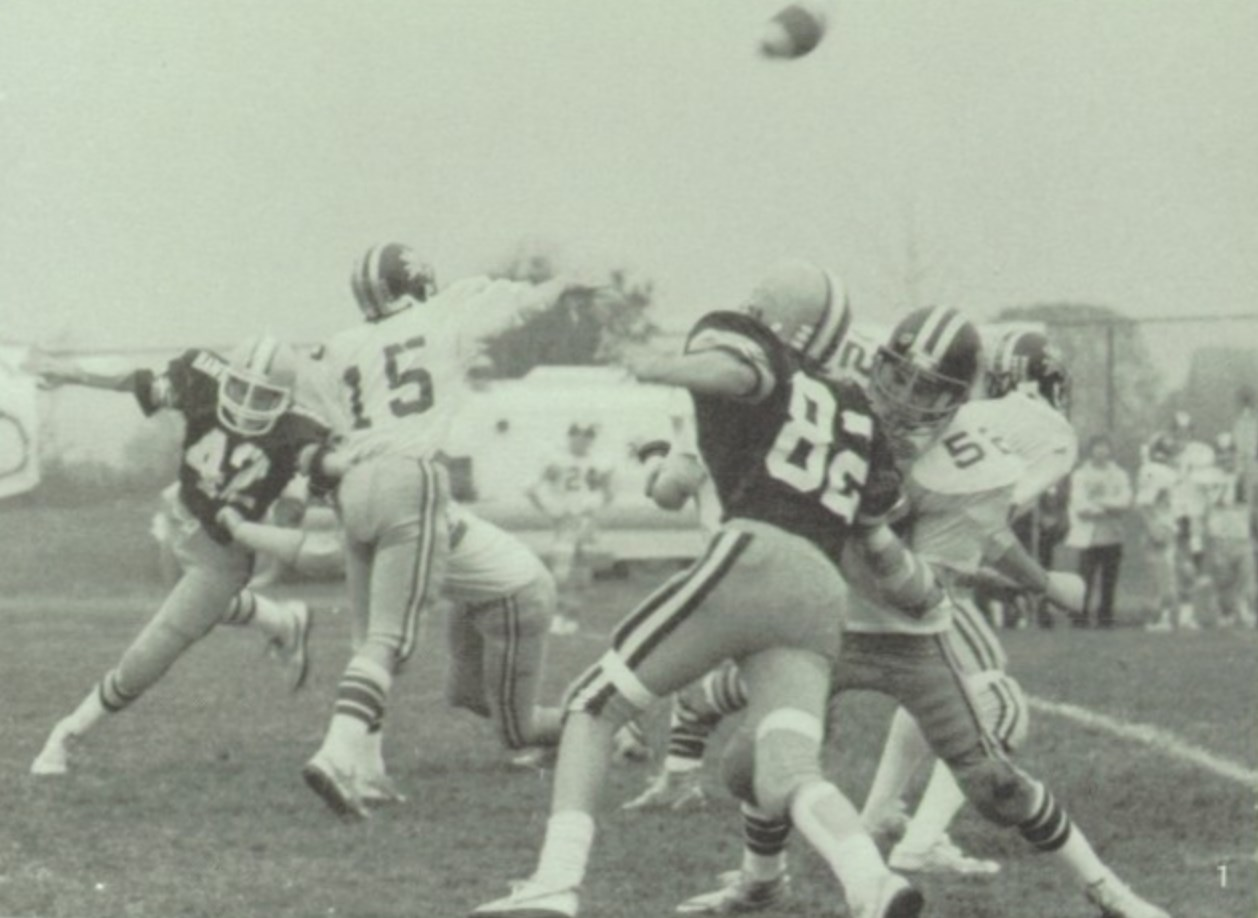
Matt Turk (#82) playing for the Hawks against Oak Creek in 1985

- Skyler Gill-Howard, NFL defensive tackle for the Detroit Lions
- Dan Nimmer, pianist for Wynton Marsalis
- Matt Turk, National Football League (NFL) punter
- Bob Wieland, Vietnam War veteran, double leg amputee marathoner, NFL strength coach
