= Thomas B. Greenfield =

Canadian scholar (1930–1992)

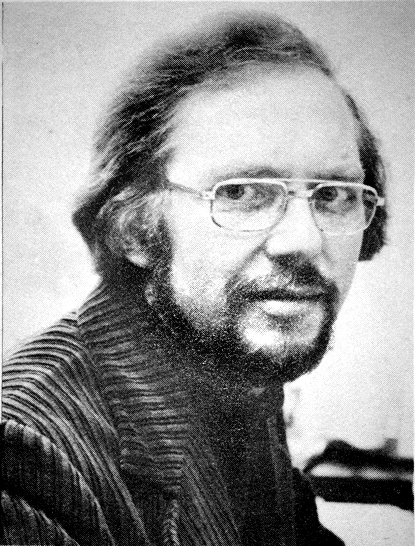
- Thomas B. Greenfield, circa 1976
- Born: 1930; Saskatchewan, Canada
- Died: 1992 (aged 61–62)

Academic background
- Influences: Max Weber

Academic work
- Era: 20th century
- Main interests: Educational administration; educational leadership
- Notable ideas: subjectivist approach to the study of educational administration

Thomas Barr Greenfield (1930–1992) was a Canadian scholar, whose ideas have been influential in the study of educational administration. Greenfield argued against the positivist orientation of the so-called Theory Movement in educational administration, and proposed a subjectivist approach to the study of educational administration. In his view, educational organizations have no existence beyond the actions, perceptions and values of the members of the organization. Thomas Greenfield's work has been studied and commented on by numerous authors. The Canadian Association for the Study of Educational Administration instituted the Thomas B. Greenfield PhD Dissertation Award in his honour, and the award is presented at the annual conference of the Canadian Society for the Study of Education.

== Life ==
Thomas Greenfield was born in 1930 in Saskatchewan, Canada. He studied English and German at the University of British Columbia. After graduating from the undergraduate program in British Columbia he began teaching in schools and eventually moved to the field of educational administration. In 1961 he moved to Edmonton Alberta to join the Masters program in Educational Administration at the University of Alberta and subsequently he completed a PhD in the same department. After a period at the University of Alberta he returned to the University of British Columbia where he worked as a professor and researcher. After a brief stay in British Columbia, he received an appointment at the Ontario Institute for Studies in Education at the University of Toronto where he wrote his most influential works.

== Writings ==
Greenfield was reluctant to frame his discussion about organizations using the classic metaphysical binaries. He noted that “organizations are essentially arbitrary definitions of reality woven in symbols and expressed in language” he argued that organizations could not be described as independent entities from human will and perception. In his work, Greenfield showed that there are deep ethical and political implications to any conception of educational organizations, particularly in relation to freedom, agency and responsibility. He criticized positivist accounts of educational administration, according to which individuals are essentially different and separate from organizations. He argued that human will and values are fundamental to the study of schools. Greenfield noted that organizing is a symbolic act that carries political and ethical significance. He indicated that meaning in organizations plays a pivotal role in defining our interpretation of organizational reality. Other overlapping themes in Greenfield’s work are the ontology of organizations, the epistemology of organizing, the role of meanings in the interpretation of organizational realities, and the ethical/political significance of educational administration.

== Influences ==
One of the most notable influences in Greenfield's work was Max Weber. Weber proposed that observers of a culture engage in a systematic process of interpretive understanding (Verstehen) in order to relate to that culture. According to Weber, the observers of a culture try to understand the culture’s social reality from the perspective of the members of that culture. Based on Weber's ideas, Greenfield indicated that the creation of the organizational reality is a participatory process in which actors interpret and construct their own reality, assigning meaning to their actions in the context of their interpersonal experiences.

== Publications ==
- Greenfield, T. B. Organizations as Social Inventions: Rethinking Assumptions About Change. (1973). The Journal of Applied Behavioral Science, 9, 5, 551-574.
- Greenfield, T. Theory about organization: A new perspective and its implications for schools. In M. Huges (Ed.), Administering education: International challenges. (1975). Athlone Press.
- Greenfield, T. B. Organization theory as ideology. Curriculum Inquiry, (1979) 9(2), 97-112.
- Greenfield, T. B. The Man Who Comes Back through the Door in the Wall: Discovering Truth, Discovering Self, Discovering Organizations. (1980). Educational Administration Quarterly, 16(3), 26-59.
- Greenfield, T .B. Against group mind: An anarchistic theory of organization. (1982). McGill Journal of Education, 17 (1), 3-11.
- Greenfield, T. B. Leaders and schools: Wilfulness and non-natural order in organizations. In T. Sergiovanni, & J. Corbally, (Ed.), New perspectives in administrative theory and practice. (1984). Illinois: University of Illinois.
- Greenfield, T. B. The decline and fall of science in educational administration. (1986). Interchange, 17 (2), 57-80.
- Greenfield, T. Re-forming and re-valuing educational administration: Whence and when cometh the phoenix? (1991). Educational Management and Administration, 19(4), 200-218.
- Greenfield, T. B. Organizations as talk, chance, action and experience. In T. Greenfield and P. Ribbins (Eds.) Greenfield on Educational Administration. (pp. 53–74) London: Routledge (1993). (Reprinted from: A. Heigl-Evers, & U. Streeck (Eds.), Die Psychologie des 20. Jahrhunderts: Lewin und die Folgen, Band VII, 1979, pp 547–558, Zurich: Kinder Verlag)
- Greenfield, T. B. Science and Service: The Making of the Profession of Educational Administration. In T. Greenfield and P. Ribbins (Eds.) Greenfield on Educational Administration, (pp. 199–228).(1993). London: Routledge. (Reprinted from: Thirty-fifth conference of the Department of Educational Administration, September, 1991, Edmonton: University of Alberta)
- Greenfield, T. B. & Ribbins, P. Educational administration as a humane science: Conversations between Thomas Greenfield and Peter Ribbins. In T. B. Greenfield & P. Ribbins (Eds.). Greenfield on educational administration: Towards a humane science.(pp. 229–271) (1993). London: Routledge.

== Works about Greenfield ==
- Gronn, P. Rethinking educational administration: T B Greenfield and his critics. (1983) Deakin University.
- Harris, C. E. The Aesthetic of Thomas B. Greenfield: An Exploration of Practices That Leave No Mark. Educational Administration Quarterly, 32, 4, 487 (1996).
- Innes-Brown, M., T.B. Greenfield and the interpretive alternative. International Journal of Educational Management, 7(2) (1993).
- Macmillan, R. (Ed.). Questioning leadership: The Greenfield legacy. (2003). Althouse Press.
- Riveros, A., Thomas Greenfield and the quest for meaning in organizations: A postponed dialogue with Ludwig Wittgenstein. Journal of Educational Administration and Foundations. 20, (2), 51-67. (2009).
- Riveros, A. Thomas Greenfield and the foundations of educational administration. In D. Burgess & P. Newton (Eds.), Educational administration and leadership: Theoretical foundations. New York: Routledge. (2014).
