= Greenfield School District =

School district in Wisconsin, United States

School District of Greenfield

Address
- 4850 South 60th Street Greenfield, Wisconsin, 53220; United States
- Coordinates: 42°57′28.1″N 87°57′16.3″W

District information
- Motto: "Learning • Growing"
- Grades: PK–12
- Established: 1957; 68 years ago
- Superintendent: Lisa Elliott
- Schools: 6
- NCES District ID: 5505940

Students and staff
- Students: 3,410 (2023–24)
- Teachers: 263.09 (on an FTE basis)
- Student–teacher ratio: 12.96
- Athletic conference: Woodland Conference

Other information
- Website: www.greenfield.k12.wi.us

The School District of Greenfield is a school district located in southwestern Milwaukee County, Wisconsin, which serves the City of Greenfield.

In 2012, the district selected former district educator and administrator, Lisa Elliott, to become superintendent of the school district.

== History ==
Before Greenfield incorporated as a city in 1957, there were a number of school districts throughout the town for neighborhood elementary schools. Parents could pick which high school in Milwaukee County they wanted to send their children. But in the late 1950s, changes in state law and overfilled high schools meant that Greenfield needed to build a high school of its own. This task was made difficult as the surrounding municipalities of Milwaukee, West Allis, West Milwaukee, Hales Corners, and Greendale continued to carve out pieces of the Town of Greenfield. Every annexation required the school districts affected to pay money to the annexing municipality, draining coffers. In the late 1950s, Greenfield incorporated as a city and the several small school districts consolidated into two: Whitnall School District and Greenfield School District.

Passage of two referendums allowed for major additions and improvements to Greenfield High School that included a new performing arts center, fitness center, academic wing, and swimming pool. After the 2010 construction was completed, district offices were combined with the high school complex.

== Schools ==
- Greenfield High School
- Greenfield Middle School
- Edgewood Elementary
- Elm Dale Elementary
- Glenwood Elementary
- Maple Grove Elementary

== Former schools ==
- Badger Elementary (was on Coldspring Road west of 27th Street)
- Chapman Elementary (was north of Layton just west of 84th Street; demolished for 84South commercial development)
- Hillcrest Elementary (was located on 43rd street between Coldspring Rd. and Howard Ave.)

== School board ==
The Greenfield School Board consists of seven members. Each member is compensated $4,500 annually and can serve an unlimited number of three-year terms.

=== 2022-2023 Members ===
Board Member	Position	Term expires
Pam Sierzchulski	President	2023
Kristie Potter	Vice-President	2025
Andy Misorski	Board Treasurer	2024
Rob Hansen	Board Clerk	2023
Nikki Cherek	Board Member	2024
Julie DeGaro	Board Member	2025
Tom Frohna	Board Member	2024

== See also ==
- List of school districts in Wisconsin
- List of high schools in Wisconsin
