= Greenfield, Missouri =

City in Missouri, U.S.

- City
- Location of Greenfield, Missouri
- Coordinates: 37°24′58″N 93°50′36″W
- Country: United States
- State: Missouri
- County: Dade

Area
  - Total: 1.14 sq mi (2.95 km^{2})
  - Land: 1.14 sq mi (2.94 km^{2})
  - Water: 0 sq mi (0.00 km^{2})
- Elevation: 1,093 ft (333 m)

Population (2020)
  - Total: 1,220
  - Density: 1,073.5/sq mi (414.47/km^{2})
- Time zone: UTC-6 (Central (CST))
  - Summer (DST): UTC-5 (CDT)
- ZIP code: 65661
- Area code: 417
- FIPS code: 29-29206
- GNIS feature ID: 2394990
- Website: greenfieldmo.org

Greenfield is a city in and the county seat of Dade County, Missouri, United States. The population was 1,220 at the 2020 census.

== History ==
Greenfield was laid out in 1841, and named for the greenery of the original town site. A post office called Greenfield has been in operation since 1850.

The Greenfield square is lined with buildings built in the 1880s out of bricks made in the Greenfield Brickyard. The Greenfield Opera House Building, which opened in 1888, is known as the "Jewel of the Square" and is still used for the summer productions of the Dade County Community Theater. It is listed on the National Register of Historic Places along with the now leveled Washington Hotel.

== Geography ==
According to the United States Census Bureau, the city has a total area of 1.14 square miles (2.95 km^{2}), all land.

== Demographics ==
Historical population
Census	Pop.	Note	%±
1860	228		—
1870	364		59.6%
1880	712		95.6%
1890	998		40.2%
1900	1,406		40.9%
1910	1,434		2.0%
1920	1,440		0.4%
1930	1,304		−9.4%
1940	1,353		3.8%
1950	1,213		−10.3%
1960	1,172		−3.4%
1970	1,172		0.0%
1980	1,394		18.9%
1990	1,416		1.6%
2000	1,358		−4.1%
2010	1,371		1.0%
2020	1,220		−11.0%
U.S. Decennial Census

=== 2010 census ===
As of the census of 2010, there were 1,371 people, 600 households, and 336 families living in the city. The population density was 1,202.6 inhabitants per square mile (464.3/km^{2}). There were 709 housing units at an average density of 621.9 per square mile (240.1/km^{2}). The racial makeup of the city was 95.6% White, 0.8% African American, 1.1% Native American, 0.1% Asian, 0.1% Pacific Islander, 0.4% from other races, and 2.0% from two or more races. Hispanic or Latino of any race were 2.4% of the population.

There were 600 households, of which 27.5% had children under the age of 18 living with them, 39.7% were married couples living together, 12.3% had a female householder with no husband present, 4.0% had a male householder with no wife present, and 44.0% were non-families. 38.3% of all households were made up of individuals, and 19% had someone living alone who was 65 years of age or older. The average household size was 2.19 and the average family size was 2.89.

The median age in the city was 43.5 years. 23.1% of residents were under the age of 18; 6.4% were between the ages of 18 and 24; 21.7% were from 25 to 44; 25% were from 45 to 64; and 23.9% were 65 years of age or older. The gender makeup of the city was 47.2% male and 52.8% female.

=== 2000 census ===
As of the census of 2000, there were 1,358 people, 623 households, and 368 families living in the city. The population density was 1,235.0 inhabitants per square mile (476.8/km^{2}). There were 731 housing units at an average density of 664.8 per square mile (256.7/km^{2}). The racial makeup of the city was 95.88% White, 0.37% African American, 1.10% Native American, 0.07% Asian, 0.07% Pacific Islander, 0.37% from other races, and 2.14% from two or more races. Hispanic or Latino of any race were 1.18% of the population.

There were 623 households, out of which 25.0% had children under the age of 18 living with them, 45.1% were married couples living together, 10.6% had a female householder with no husband present, and 40.8% were non-families. 37.7% of all households were made up of individuals, and 23.3% had someone living alone who was 65 years of age or older. The average household size was 2.17 and the average family size was 2.82.

In the city, the population was spread out, with 23.7% under the age of 18, 7.4% from 18 to 24, 21.0% from 25 to 44, 23.4% from 45 to 64, and 24.5% who were 65 years of age or older. The median age was 43 years. For every 100 females, there were 83.8 males. For every 100 females age 18 and over, there were 78.9 males.

The median income for a household in the city was $22,336, and the median income for a family was $28,594. Males had a median income of $27,955 versus $17,727 for females. The per capita income for the city was $14,051. About 12.3% of families and 18.6% of the population were below the poverty line, including 24.8% of those under age 18 and 15.6% of those age 65 or over.

== Education ==
Public education in Greenfield is administered by Greenfield R-IV School District, which operates one elementary school and Greenfield High School. Faith Fellowship Christian Academy is a private institution. Greenfield R-IV gained international notoriety in 2022 for refusing to renew the contract of a secondary English teacher who used a worksheet in class regarding “racial privilege.” https://www.newsweek.com/teacher-loses-job-after-assigning-how-racially-privileged-are-you-paper-1696136 Greenfield has a lending library, the Dade County Library.

== See also ==
- List of cities in Missouri
