= Mount Greenfield =

Ice-free mountain in Antarctica

Mount Greenfield (80°46′S 27°36′W) is an ice-free mountain rising to 1,490 metres (4,890 ft) and surmounting the western extremity of Stephenson Bastion in the Shackleton Range of Antarctica. It was mapped in 1957 by the Commonwealth Trans-Antarctic Expedition (CTAE) and named after George C. Greenfield, a literary agent of the CTAE from 1955 to 1958.
