= Greenfield (Charlotte Court House, Virginia) =

Historic house in Virginia, United States

- U.S. National Register of Historic Places
- Virginia Landmarks Register
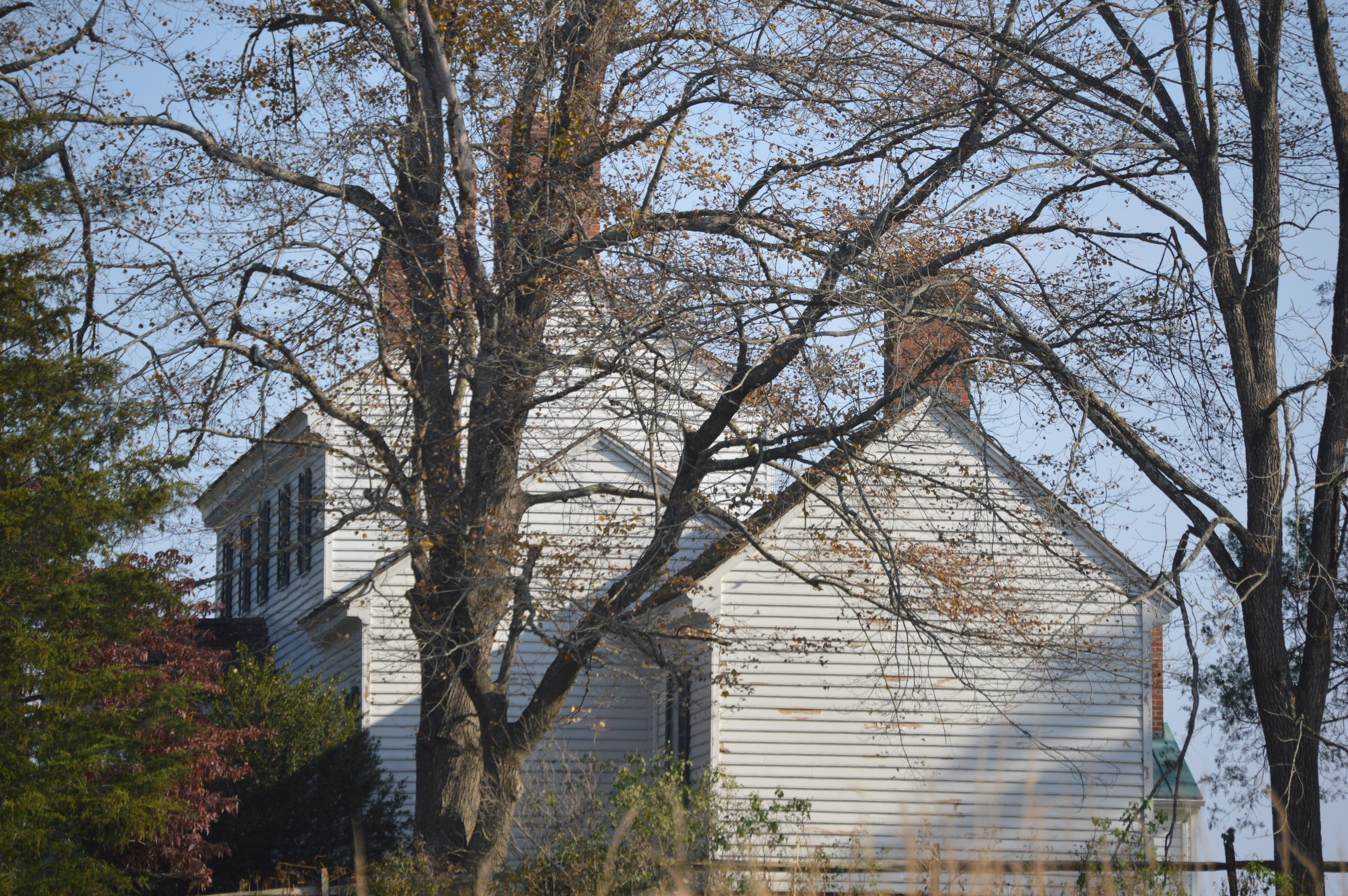
- Roadside view

- Location within Virginia Location within the United States
- Location: E of Charlotte Court House on VA 656, near Charlotte Court House, Virginia
- Coordinates: 37°4′1″N 78°35′2″W
- Area: 100 acres (40 ha)
- Built: 1771
- NRHP reference No.: 73002000
- VLR No.: 019-0008

Significant dates
- Added to NRHP: April 2, 1973
- Designated VLR: October 17, 1972

Greenfield is a historic plantation house located near Charlotte Court House, Charlotte County, Virginia. It was built in 1771 as the main residence of Isaac Read (1739–1777), a member of the Virginia House of Burgesses. It is a frame dwelling consisting of a five-bay, single-pile, two-story main section flanked by two-bay one-story wings. It is topped by a shallow gable roof and the rear elevation features a full-width shed roof gallery.

It was listed on the National Register of Historic Places in 1973. Within Charlotte County, it is the oldest two-story frame house.

Near the house, located at the intersection of George Washington Highway (Virginia Route 40) and Greenfield Road (County Route 656), is a marker that was put up in 1935, which is inscribed "Half a mile north is Greenfield, built in 1771 by Isaac Read. Read was a member of the House of Burgesses, 1769-1771, and of the Virginia conventions of 1774 and 1775. He served as an officer in the Revolutionary War, dying of wounds in 1777".

One of its former owners was Thomas Jackson Charlton IV, a physician from Savannah, Georgia. He inherited it from his mother-in-law.
