= Greenfield (Minecraft) =

Fictional city created in Minecraft

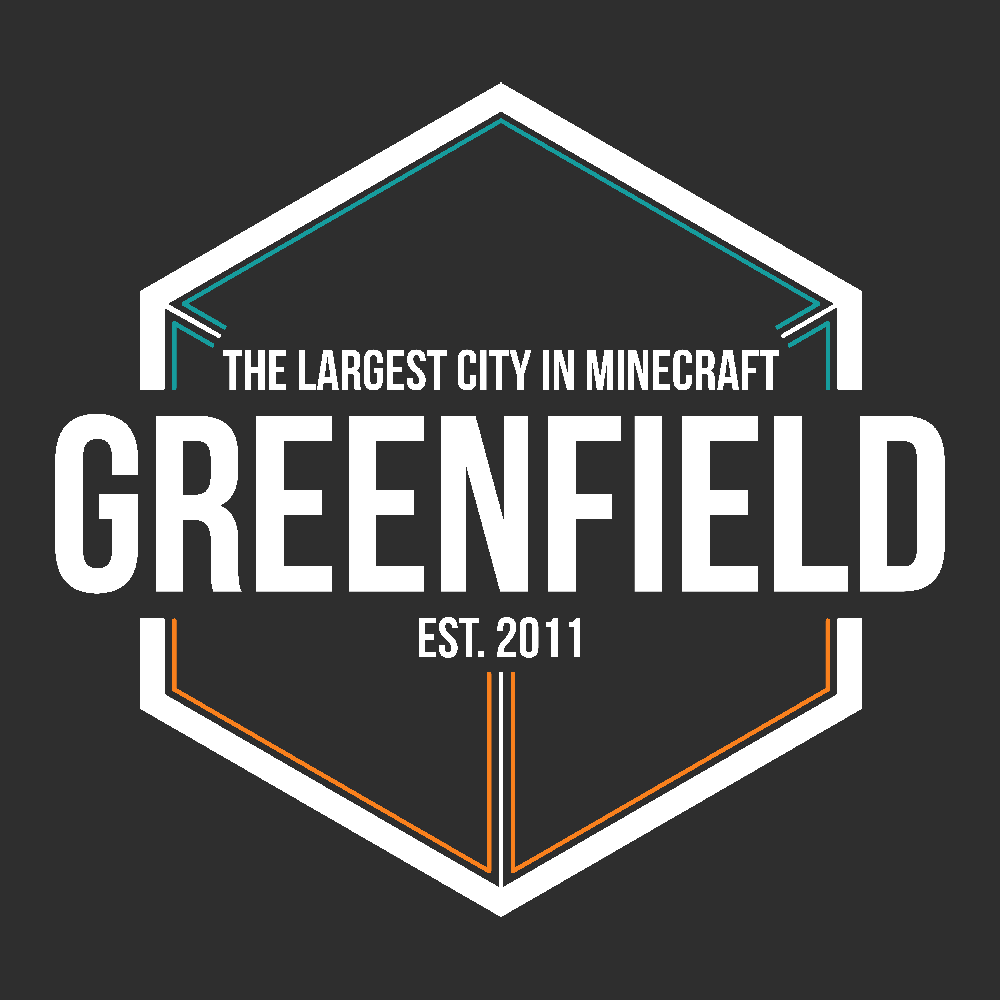
- Commercial?: No
- Type of project: Building a full-scale city in Minecraft
- Founder: THEJESTR
- Established: August 29, 2011; 14 years ago
- Website: https://www.greenfieldmc.net

Greenfield is a fictional city created within the 2011 sandbox game Minecraft. As of May 2022, the city is one-fourth complete and has a size of 20 million blocks. The city was started by Minecraft user THEJESTR in August 2011. As of May 2025, there are approximately 1.4 million downloads of the city map. According to Planet Minecraft statistics, Greenfield is the second-most downloaded Minecraft map of all time.

Greenfield is designed to resemble the West Coast of the United States, heavily inspired by Los Angeles, and is built to a one-to-one scale, with each block's size being one cubic meter. It has various features of an actual city, such as industrial areas, ports, public transportation, suburbs, a downtown area, and an airport. With thousands of builds, Greenfield is continuously being worked on with an increasing standard of build quality. Almost every building has elaborate interiors, which are inspected for functionality each time a new build is published. A group of 10 people supervise the city, and more than 400 people have helped build the city.

As of the latest release, Greenfield has 39 districts.

== Reception ==
Gina Lees, writing for PCGamesN, listed Greenfield as one of the best Minecraft cities, writing that it has "incredible city detail" and that one "can spend ages wandering through the different areas". Stephany Nunneley of VG247 called the city "amazing", and Chris Carter of Destructoid described it as a "living and breathing" city. According to Bryan Lawver of Screen Rant, Greenfield's level of detail makes it resemble more of "a screenshot from SimCity than a blocky Minecraft creation when viewed from above". Dmitry Lapunov, also writing for Screen Rant, stated that the city's features make it "look believable", calling the city "a project of sincere passion". Nate Crowley of Rock, Paper, Shotgun found the terraforming of the landscape to be more impressive than the city itself, saying that it reminded him of planet builders in The Hitchhiker's Guide to the Galaxy.
