= Surl, North Carolina =

Unincorporated community in North Carolina, US

Coordinates: 36°20′38″N 078°53′50″W

Surl is an unincorporated community in southeastern Person County, North Carolina, United States, located north of Moriah and five miles (8 km) east of Somerset. It
