= Greenfield Township =

Greenfield Township may refer to:

== Arkansas ==
- Greenfield Township, Craighead County, Arkansas, in Craighead County, Arkansas
- Greenfield Township, Monroe County, Arkansas, in Monroe County, Arkansas
- Greenfield Township, Poinsett County, Arkansas, in Poinsett County, Arkansas

== Illinois ==
- Greenfield Township, Grundy County, Illinois

== Indiana ==
- Greenfield Township, LaGrange County, Indiana
- Greenfield Township, Orange County, Indiana

== Iowa ==
- Greenfield Township, Adair County, Iowa
- Greenfield Township, Calhoun County, Iowa
- Greenfield Township, Jones County, Iowa
- Greenfield Township, Warren County, Iowa

== Kansas ==
- Greenfield Township, Elk County, Kansas

== Michigan ==
- Greenfield Township, Michigan, defunct

== Minnesota ==
- Greenfield Township, Minnesota

== North Dakota ==
- Greenfield Township, Griggs County, North Dakota, in Griggs County, North Dakota
- Greenfield Township, Traill County, North Dakota, in Traill County, North Dakota

== Ohio ==
- Greenfield Township, Fairfield County, Ohio
- Greenfield Township, Gallia County, Ohio
- Greenfield Township, Huron County, Ohio

== Pennsylvania ==
- Greenfield Township, Blair County, Pennsylvania
- Greenfield Township, Erie County, Pennsylvania
- Greenfield Township, Lackawanna County, Pennsylvania

== South Dakota ==
- Greenfield Township, Brown County, South Dakota, in Brown County, South Dakota
