= Green fields, Ooty =

Green fields
- Suburb
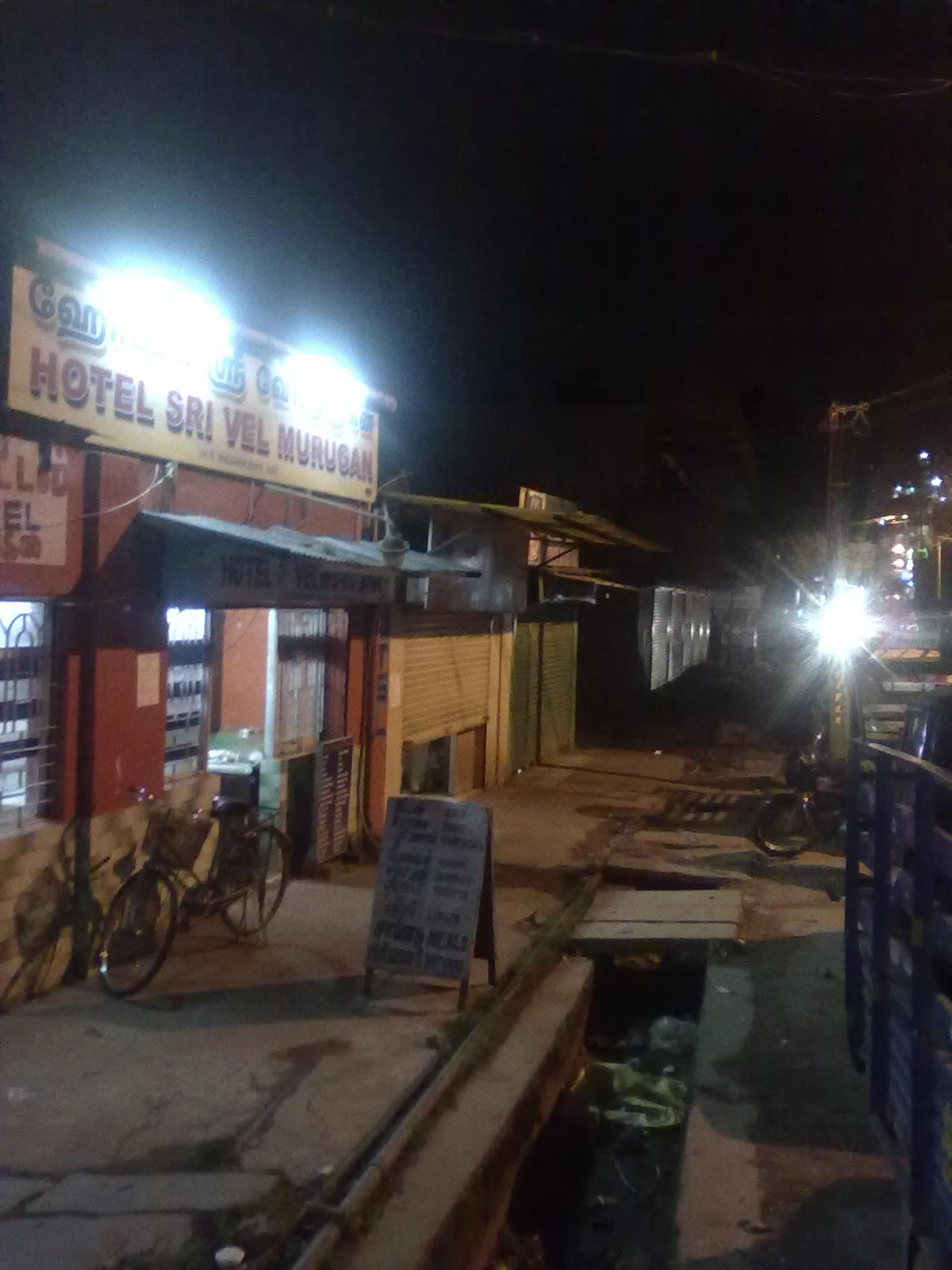
- Hotel Shri Velmurugan at Green fields, Ooty

- Location in Tamil Nadu, India
- Coordinates: 11.408808°N 76.706961°E
- Country: India
- State: Tamil Nadu
- District: The Nilgiris

Government
  - Body: Udagamandalam Municipality Corporation
- Elevation: 2,400 m (7,900 ft)

Languages
  - Official: Tamil
- Time zone: UTC+5:30 (IST)
- PIN: 643 001
- Telephone code: 91423
- Vehicle registration: TN 43
- Civic agency: Udagamandalam Municipality Corporation
- Climate: Tropical wet (Köppen)
- Precipitation: 1,237 millimetres (48.7 in)
- Avg. annual temperature: 20 °C (68 °F)
- Temperature from Batchmates.com

Green fields is a suburb in Ooty town in the Tamil Nadu state of India. It constitutes ward no. 9 of the Ooty constituency of Tamil Nadu.

== Establishments ==
=== Hotels ===
- Hotel Sri Velmurugan
- Hotel Greens
- Seethalakshmi Lodge

=== Schools ===
- St. Philomena's Primary School
- Sri Venkateshwara Vidyalaya

== See also ==
- Government Rose Garden, Ooty
- Government Botanical Gardens, Udagamandalam
- Ooty Lake
- Ooty Golf Course
- Stone House, Ooty
- Ooty Radio Telescope
- Mariamman temple, Ooty
- St. Stephen's Church, Ooty
- Kamaraj Sagar Dam
