= Greenfield Stadium =

Greenfield Stadium could refer to:

- Greenfield Stadium (Trelawny), a multi-purpose stadium in Jamaica.
- Greenfield Stadium, Bradford, a former rugby league, greyhound racing and speedway stadium in Bradford, England.
- Greenfields Sports Ground, the home ground of English football team, Market Drayton Town F.C.
- Greenfield International Stadium, a multi-purpose stadium in Thiruvananthapuram, India.
