= Greenfield Park =

Greenfield Park may refer to:

- Greenfield Park, Michigan, an unincorporated community in the United States
- Greenfield Park, New South Wales, a suburb of Sydney, Australia
- Greenfield Park, New York, a hamlet of the village of Ellensville, New York, United States
- Greenfield Park, Quebec, a borough of the city of Longueuil, Quebec and a suburb of Montreal, Canada
- Greenfield Park, Wisconsin, a park in Milwaukee County, Wisconsin in the United States
- Greenfield Park, a road in Dublin, Ireland
- Greenfield Park, a public park in Glasgow, Scotland
