= Somerset, North Carolina =

Unincorporated community in North Carolina, US

Coordinates: 36°21′16″N 078°58′44″W

Somerset is an unincorporated community in Person County, North Carolina, United States, located approximately five miles (8 km) west of Surl and 2.5 mi (4 km) south of Roxboro.
