= Greenfield, Kings County =

Community in Nova Scotia, Canada

Coordinates: 45°1′25.67″N 64°19′52.07″W

Greenfield in Nova Scotia

Greenfield is a community in the Canadian province of Nova Scotia, located in Kings County. The first settlers in the area came from New England and were provided land grants in 1759. Originally known as "Greenfield", the name was changed to "Etna" on 5 July 1951, but eventually reverted back to "Greenfield" on 30 August 1966.

The reason for the change to "Etna" is unclear. The name refers to Mount Etna in Sicily, and while there is no volcanic activity in the area, the name may have referred to the nearby elevation of 650 feet.
