= Greenfield, Colchester County =

Community in Nova Scotia, Canada

Coordinates: 45°22′17.2″N 63°8′1.04″W

Greenfield in Nova Scotia

Greenfield is an unincorporated community in the Canadian province of Nova Scotia, located in Colchester County. It is two miles south of the Salmon River and six miles east of Truro, NS. The name is intended to describe the landscape, annotated by surveyor Alexander Miller around 1817.

== History ==
In 1814, land was granted to James Braynion of Truro who came to Nova Scotia from Scotland in 1797; Samuel Whidden Jr., a native of Truro-born in 1789; John Reed, a native of Londonderry township, born in 1789; Samuel Whidden, Sr; and Eddy Whidden, who repeatedly is referenced as being the first settler around 1815. John Dickson, who came from Scotland in about 1774 and his son Thomas, residents of Onslow Mountain in 1814, received grants of land here in 1815. Farming and some lumbering were local industries. The population in 1956 was 76.

== Wind turbines ==
In 2013, Affinity Wind sought an environmental assessment provide 3.2 MW of wind power into the local distribution grid in Greenfield, via two wind turbines to be installed on private land. The scheme was approved subject to terms which included noise monitoring.

== Landmarks ==
=== Greenfield United Church ===
The Greenfield United Church is registered as a Municipal Heritage Property. It is over 120 years old, erected in 1888. It is the only church in the community and is a Union Church to serve both Presbyterians and Methodists. It became a United Church of Canada in 1925.
