= Greenfield, Hants County =

Community in Nova Scotia, Canada

Greenfield
- Location in Nova Scotia
- Coordinates: 45°3′41″N 63°53′5″W
- Country: Canada
- Province: Nova Scotia
- County: Hants County
- Municipality: East Hants Municipality
- Time zone: UTC-4 (AST)
  - Summer (DST): UTC-3 (ADT)
- Canadian Postal Code: B0N
- Area code: 902
- Telephone Exchange: 883
- NTS Map: 011E04
- GNBC Code: CAOMT

Greenfield is an unincorporated community in the Canadian province of Nova Scotia, located in East Hants Municipality in Hants County.

East Hants was historically divided into two townships, Rawdon and Douglas. Greenfield was included in the Rawdon township, along with Upper, Centre and South Rawdon, Pleasant Valley and parts of Hillsvale.

Greenfield is a small community, with census data available for the wider region of East Hants, which had a population of 22,892 in 2021, with 9,387 private dwellings. Data from 2023, showed that the wider East Hants region was experiencing one of the largest increases in population in Nova Scotia.
