= John Groenveldt =

- Born: 1647?
- Died: 1710?
- Other names: John Greenfield
- Occupation: Physician

John Groenveldt or Greenfield, M.D. (1647?-1710?), was a physician.

== Education and early career ==
Groenveldt, born about 1647, was a native of Deventer in Holland. He was educated partly in Holland and then under Franciscus Zypæus (the younger) at Louvain, and in Paris. On 13 September 1667 he was entered as a medical student at Leyden, but graduated M.D. at Utrecht on 18 March 1670. His thesis, De Calculo Vesicæ (Utrecht, 1670), was translated into English and published in London in 1677, and with large additions in 1710. About 1673 he was appointed physician in chief to the garrison at Grave. Ten years afterwards he came to England, settled in Throgmorton Street, London, and was admitted a licentiate of the Royal College of Physicians on 2 April 1683.

== Charges of malpractice ==
Supported by powerful patronage he passed as a specialist on gout and stone, but was regarded by most of his brethren as a quack. In 1693 he was summoned before the college for mala praxis in the internal use of cantharidin, but was not punished. In April 1697 he was again summoned for the same offence, and was fined and committed to Newgate Prison, but was soon released. A female patient, to whom he is said to have administered thirty-six grains of the medicine, brought an action against him on the following 7 December, but though nearly twenty members of the college appeared on her behalf, a verdict was given in his favour. He in turn sued the college for wrongful imprisonment, but the court gave judgment for the defendants on 8 June 1700.

In May 1710 Groenveldt was living opposite the Sun Tavern, Threadneedle Street, but died apparently in the same year.

== Writings ==
Groenveldt, or Greenfield, as he sometimes styled himself in England, was the author of a small treatise on his favourite medicine, entitled Tutus Cantharidum in medicina Usus internus, 1698 (2nd edition, 1703), which was translated into English, with additions, by John Marten, surgeon, in 1706. He wrote also:

- Dissertatio Lithologica, 1684; 2nd edition, 1687.
- Practica Medica, 1688.
- Arthritology; or a Discourse of the Gout, 1691.
- Fundamenta Medicinse scriptoribus … præstantioribus deprompta [anon.], 1714; 2nd edition, with author's name (1715). This handbook, compiled by Groenveldt from the dictation of Zypæus, was published in English in 1715 and 1753.
