= Greenfield Academy =

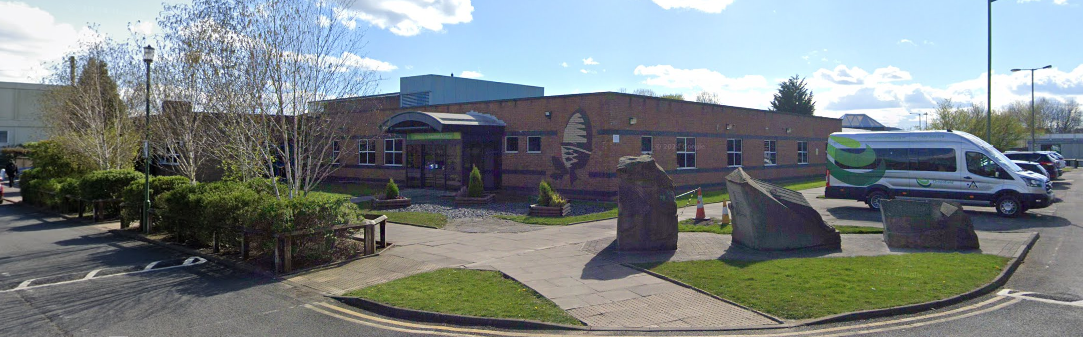

Location
- Newton Aycliffe and Shildon, County Durham; England; 54°37′12″N 1°36′04″W

Information
- Type: Academy
- Established: 1974
- Founder: 67
- Trust: Advance Learning Partnership
- Department for Education URN: 149962 Tables
- Ofsted: Reports
- Executive headteacher: James Keating
- Head Of School: Amy Aspland
- Gender: Coeducational
- Age: 11 to 16
- Enrolment: 736 as of August 2023
- Website: https://greenfieldacademy.org.uk/

Greenfield Academy (formerly Greenfield Secondary School and then Greenfield Community College) is a coeducational secondary school with academy status, located on the outskirts of Newton Aycliffe, County Durham, England. It was opened in 1974 and was visited by Tony Blair on 30 June 2000 when it was awarded specialist status as an Arts and Science College.

Greenfield provides a range of opportunities in and out of the classroom. The strength of the provision was noted by OFSTED, who rated the school as Requires Improvement in May 2017 and again in September 2019.

Previously a foundation school administered by Durham County Council, in September 2023 Greenfield Community College converted to academy status and was renamed Greenfield Academy. The school is now sponsored by the Advance Learning Partnership.

== Ofsted reports ==
The following are Ofsted report findings:

- 2019 - Requires Improvement
- 2017 - Requires Improvement
- 2012 - Good

== Footballers who went to Greenfield ==
- Luis Longstaff
- Harrison Jones
