= Green Fields School =

Location
- 6000 N. Camino De La Tierra; Tucson, Arizona 85741; United States
- Coordinates: 32.316823°N 111.037316°W

Information
- Former name: Green Fields Country Day School
- Established: 1933
- Category: Private School
- Grades: K–12
- Enrollment: ~150 (2018–19)
- Colors: Green and white
- Mascot: The Griffin
- Accreditation: NCA Commission on Accreditation and School Improvement (NCA CASI)
- Website: www.greenfields.school

Green Fields School is a Private, non-profit School (a member campus of Accelerated Elementary and Secondary Schools) in Tucson, Arizona, United States. It provides educational services for elementary, middle, and high school students (Pre-K..12).

Previously Green Fields School was an independent, non-profit school. The school closed briefly filing bankruptcy in July 2019.

Green Fields, also known as Green Fields Country Day School, was founded in 1933 as the Circle Double A Green Fields Preparatory School for Boys, a boarding school. It became coed and ceased operating as a boarding school in the 1960s.

== Notable alumni ==
- Blake Masters (2004), venture capitalist and political candidate
- Mark Poirier (1986), writer
- Kerri Strug (1995), Olympic gymnast and member of the Magnificent Seven
