= Maze Creek =

Stream in the US state of Missouri

Maze Creek is a stream in southeast Cedar and northeast Dade counties in southwest Missouri.

The stream headwaters are located at 37°27′37″N 93°38′02″W and the confluence with the Little Sac River (within Stockton Lake) is at 37°35′34″N 93°42′32″W. The stream source is southeast of Dadeville. The stream flows north passing under Missouri Route W between Dadeville and Knox in southwestern Polk County. It then turns northwest passing under Missouri Route 245 between Dadeville and Bona and enters an arm of Stockton Lake passing under Missouri Route 215 west of Bona. Variant names include Arbell Creek and Turkey Creek.

Maze Creek has the name of the local Maze family.

== See also ==
- List of rivers of Missouri
