= Bear Creek (Sac River tributary) =

Stream in Missouri, U.S.

Coordinates: 37°43′01″N 93°44′56″W

Bear Creek is a stream in Dade and Polk counties in the Ozarks of southwest Missouri. It is a tributary to the Sac River.

The stream headwaters are in Polk County at and the confluence with the Sac River is in Dade County at at an elevation of 764 feet. The stream source area is south of Bolivar and just north of the community of Karlin. The stream flows to the northwest passing under Missouri Route 123 and Missouri Route 32 south and west of Fair Play. and passes to the northeast of Bearcreek. The stream continues to the northwest and west to its confluence with the Sac River about two miles north of the Stockton Lake dam northeast of Stockton.

The name derives from the abundance of bears in the vicinity of the stream during the time of settlement.
