= Tommie Creek =

Stream in the US state of Missouri

Tommie Creek is a stream in Polk County in the U.S. state of Missouri. It is a tributary of Slagle Creek.

The stream headwaters arise northwest of Slagle on Missouri Route 13 and south of Karlin at 37°32′44″N 93°25′34″W and the stream flows generally south to its confluence with Slagle Creek about 1.5 miles north of Morrisville at 37°30′15″N 93°25′13″W. The elevation of the confluence is 938 feet.

Variant names were "Tommy Creek" and "Tomahawk Creek". The creek was so named on account of the discovery of tomahawk relics in the area.

== See also ==
- List of rivers of Missouri
