= Turkey Creek (Little Sac River tributary) =

Stream in the US state of Missouri

Turkey Creek is a stream in the Ozarks of southwest Missouri. It is a tributary of the Little Sac River.

The source is located at: 37°24′39″N 93°33′50″W and the confluence is at: 37°33′39″N 93°37′25″W. Turkey Creek begins as an intermittent stream on the northwest margin of Walnut Grove in northwestern Greene County adjacent to Missouri Route 123. It flows north into southwestern Polk County past Eudora and enters the Little Sac arm of Stockton Lake under Missouri Route 215. Prior to the filling of Stockton Lake the stream confluence with the Little Sac was just to the northwest in northeast Dade County. King Branch enters Turkey Creek from the south just south of Stockton Lake.

Turkey Creek was so named due to the presence of wild turkeys near its course.

== See also ==
- List of rivers of Missouri
