= Barren Creek =

Barren Creek may refer to:

- Barren Creek (Bear Creek tributary), a stream in Missouri
- Barren Creek, West Virginia, an unincorporated community

== See also ==
- Barren Fork (disambiguation)
