= Barren Creek (Bear Creek tributary) =

Stream in Missouri, U.S.

Barren Creek is a stream in Polk County in the U.S. state of Missouri. It is a tributary of Bear Creek.

The stream headwaters are just west of Missouri Route 13 northwest of Bolivar at 37°37′54″N 93°28′19″W. The stream flows southwest crossing under Missouri Route 32 and Missouri Route 123 to the east and south of Fair Play. The stream flows into the north side of Bear Creek 1.5 miles south of Fair Play at 37°36′31″N 93°34′29″W.

Barren Creek was named after Kentucky's Barren River.

== See also ==
- List of rivers of Missouri
