= Slagle Creek (Little Sac River tributary) =

Stream in the United States of America

Slagle Creek is a stream in Polk County in the Ozarks of southwest Missouri. It is a tributary of the Little Sac River.

The stream headwaters are located at 37°31′18″N 93°20′16″W and the confluence with Little Sac is at 37°29′32″N 93°28′50″W.

The stream source lies east of Missouri Route 13 and the stream flows west under Route 13 just south of the communities of Cedar Vista and Slagle. As the stream flows to the west north of Morrisville the Burlington Railroad enters the valley along the Tommie Creek tributary and follows the stream along its north banks past Wishart to its confluence with the Little Sac River just north of Missouri Route 215.

Slagle Creek has the name of the local Slagle family.

== See also ==
- List of rivers of Missouri
