= Stinking Creek (Pomme de Terre River tributary) =

Stream in the American state of Missouri

Stinking Creek is a stream in northern Polk County in the U.S. state of Missouri. It is a tributary of the Pomme de Terre River. The stream headwaters are along Missouri Route D between Polk and Huron. The stream flows north-northwest and enters the southern end of Pomme de Terre Lake just west of Adonis.

The stream source is at 37°42′35″N 93°19′09″W, and its confluence is at 37°47′56″N 93°22′30″W.

Stinking Creek was so named on account of the naturally occurring stench it produces.

== See also ==
- List of rivers of Missouri
