= Possum Creek =

Small stream in northern Polk County, Missouri

Possum Creek is a small stream in northern Polk County, Missouri, United States. Its source coordinates are 37°48′00″N 93°18′02″W, and its confluence coordinates are 37°48′01″N 93°21′58″W.

It is a tributary of the Pomme de Terre River entering the south end of Pomme de Terre Lake. The stream headwaters are just west of the village of Sentinel and its mouth on the lake near Adonis is just three miles west.

A variant name was "Opossum Creek". The creek was so named on account of opossums in the area.

== See also ==
- List of rivers of Missouri
