= McKinney Branch =

Stream in Polk County, Missouri, U.S.

McKinney Branch is a stream in Polk County in the U.S. state of Missouri. It is a tributary of the Pomme de Terre River.

The stream headwaters are just northeast of Slagle and Missouri Route 13 southeast of Bolivar at 37°32′43″N 93°21′53″W The stream flows to the northeast crosses under Route Y and enters the Pomme de Terre to the west of Van at 37°33′59″N 93°19′01″W at an elevation of 935 ft.

McKinney Branch has the name of the local McKinney family.

== See also ==
- List of rivers of Missouri
