= Slagle =

Slagle may refer to:

== Places in the United States ==
- Slagle, Louisiana
- Slagle, Missouri
- Slagle, West Virginia
- Slagle Creek (disambiguation)
- Slagle Ridge
- Slagle Township, Michigan

== People with the surname Slagle ==
- Christian W. Slagle
- Dutch Slagle
- Eleanor Clarke Slagle
- Gene Slagle
- James Robert Slagle, American computer scientist (1934 – 2023)
- Jimmy Slagle
- John Slagle
- Roger Slagle
- Steve Slagle
- Tim Slagle
- Walt Slagle
