= Cave Spring Branch =

Stream in southwest Missouri, U.S.

Cave Spring Branch is a stream in eastern Dade County in southwest Missouri.

The stream source is at 37°21′36″N 93°41′32″W and the confluence with the Sac River is at 37°27′10″N 93°42′51″W.

The stream source is about one mile northeast of Everton and it flows north to the east of and parallel to U.S. Route 160 until that route turns west. The stream passes under Missouri Route 245 and gains the flow from Cave Spring. The stream continues to the north-northwest entering the Sac River arm of Stockton Lake.

A spring exiting a cave along the course of Cave Spring Branch accounts for the name.

== See also ==
- List of rivers of Missouri
