= Missouri Route 245 =

State highway in Missouri, U.S.

Route 245
- MO 245 highlighted in red

Route information
- Maintained by MoDOT
- Length: 16.833 mi (27.090 km)
- Existed: October 1970–present

Major junctions
- South end: US 160 east of Greenfield
- North end: Route 32 west of Fair Play

Location
- Country: United States
- State: Missouri
- Counties: Dade, Cedar

Highway system
- Missouri State Highway System; Interstate; US; State; Supplemental
← Route 242	→ Route 246

Route 245 is a short two-lane highway in southwest Missouri. Its northern terminus is at Route 32 about three miles (4.8 km) west of Fair Play; its southern terminus is at U.S. Route 160 about seven miles (11 km) east of Greenfield. It was originally supplemental routes prior to 1970 similar to Missouri Route 215.

== Route description ==
Throughout the entire route, Route 245 is a two-lane undivided highway. It begins at an intersection with US 160 about seven miles west of Greenfield. After 1 mile (1.6 km), the road comes to a junction with Route U, which runs east towards Walnut Grove. Heading north, it passes through Dadeville, where it intersects Route W, before reaching an intersection with Route 215 in Bona. The road continues to head north, where it passes over Stockton Lake. Finally, the road terminates at Route 32, about 3 miles (4.8 km) west of Fair Play.

== Major intersections ==
County	Location	mi	km	Destinations	Notes
Dade	Polk Township	0.000	0.000	US 160	
Dade	Polk Township	1.010	1.625	Route U east	
Dade	Dadeville	5.004	8.053	Route W west	
Dade	North Morgan Township	9.446	15.202	Route 215	
Dade	North Morgan Township	10.151	16.336	Route RA north	
Cedar	Madison Township	16.833	27.090	Route 32	
1.000 mi = 1.609 km; 1.000 km = 0.621 mi
