= Dry Fork (Pomme de Terre River tributary) =

Stream in the American state of Missouri

Dry Fork is a stream in Polk County in the U.S. state of Missouri. It is a tributary of the Pomme de Terre River.

The stream headwaters are at 37°39′06″N 93°28′23″W and the confluence with the Pomme de Terre River is at 37°44′47″N 93°25′18″W. The stream source area is just east of Missouri Route 13 northwest of Bolivar and it flows north along the Burlington Railroad Line past Cliquot. It turns abruptly east and meanders under Missouri Route 83 south of Rondo to its confluence with the Pomme de Terre just south of the Pomme de Terre Lake.

Dry Fork was named for the fact it often runs dry.

== See also ==
- List of rivers of Missouri
