= Polk Township, Dade County, Missouri =

Township in the American state of Missouri

Coordinates: 37.40°N 93.69°W

Polk Township is a rural township in Dade County, in the U.S. state of Missouri. It is laid out as a north-south rectangle just east of Pleasant Hill, Dade County, Missouri. There is much open farmland. Several streams, including Cave Spring Branch, Lumley Branch, Turnback Creek, and the Sac River flow through this township.

Polk Township has the name of James K. Polk, 11th President of the United States.
