= Knox, Missouri =

Unincorporated community in Missouri, U.S.

Coordinates: 37°28′28″N 93°36′38″W

Knox is an unincorporated community in southwest Polk County, in the Ozarks of southwest Missouri, United States. A variant name for the community was Nox.

The community is located on Missouri Route W, one mile east of the Polk–Dade county line. The location is about midway between Eudora on the east and Dadeville on the west. The community is on King Branch of Turkey Creek about four miles south of Stockton Lake.

The community was originally named Nox for the Latin word nox (night or dark) in reference to the shade of a nearby black oak grove. A post office was established at Nox in 1901 and ceased operation in 1906.
