= Deer Creek (Pomme de Terre River tributary) =

Stream in the American state of Missouri

Deer Creek is a stream in Polk County in the Ozarks of southwest Missouri. It is a tributary of the Pomme de Terre River.

The stream headwaters are located at 37°32′32″N 93°13′18″W and the confluence with the Pomme de Terre is at 37°34′51″N 93°18′44″W. The stream arises to the southwest of the community of Schofield and flows southwest and then northwest passing under Missouri Route H and Missouri Route YY past Van before entering the Pomme de Terre south of Burns.

Deer Creek was so named on account of deer in the area.

== See also ==
- List of rivers of Missouri
