= Slagle Creek =

Slagle Creek may refer to:

- Slagle Creek (Brush Creek), a stream in Missouri
- Slagle Creek (Little Sac River), a stream in Missouri
- Slagle Creek (Applegate River tributary), a stream in Oregon
