= Rolfe D. Mandel =

Rolfe D. Mandel (born August 25, 1952) is a geoarchaeologist and Distinguished Professor in the Department of Anthropology at the University of Kansas as well as Senior Scientist and Executive Director of the Odyssey Archaeological Research Program at the Kansas Geological Survey (KGS). Initially trained as a geographer, he has been a major figure in defining the subdiscipline of geoarchaeology and has focused on the effects of geologic processes on the archaeological record since the early 1990s. Mandel has been the principal investigator and/or geoarchaeologist on projects supported by the National Geographic Society, the Wenner-Gren Foundation, and various federal agencies, including the National Science Foundation, National Park Service, U.S. Geological Survey, and U.S. Army Corps of Engineers.

Mandel has published more than 100 peer-reviewed journal articles, book chapters and technical reports. His research represents an interdisciplinary approach to archaeology, geology, and geography. His primary research interests include geoarchaeology, paleopedology, late-Quaternary landscape evolution, isotope geochemistry, and paleoenvironmental reconstruction in the Great Plains region of the United States as well as in the eastern Mediterranean. His research includes Watson Brake in northern Louisiana at 5400 BP, which he helped to date as the earliest known site in North America with monumental earthworks. He also studied cultural landscape and qanat systems of southern Afghanistan's Kandahar province using remote sensing techniques.

== Early life and education ==
Mandel was born in San Antonio, Texas. He completed a B.A. in physical geography at the University of Texas at Austin in 1975 followed by a M.S. in geography (1980) at the University of Kansas and a Ph.D. through the Special Studies program at the University of Kansas (1991) for research on Holocene landscape evolution in southwestern Kansas.

== Professional career ==
In 1975, Mandel worked as a research associate for the resource planning section at the Texas Parks and Wildlife Department. assisting with an environmental analysis for the Houston-Galveston region. As a graduate student at the University of Kansas in 1976, he undertook similar work on resource sustainability through the Social and Environmental Studies (ISES) program. From 1978 to 1986, he served as coordinator of the Environmental Research Program. In 1982, Mandel shifted his focus to geoarchaeology. In 1987, he became a lecturer in the Department of Geography at the University of Kansas. From 1989 to 1993, Mandel was an assistant professor at the University of Nebraska at Omaha.

Mandel joined the faculty of the University of Kansas as an adjunct professor in 1993. In 2002, he was hired by the Kansas Geological Survey (KGS) as a part-time project coordinator for the Geoarchaeology Research Program. In 2003, he joined the Department of Anthropology as an associate professor. Mandel was promoted to full professor and senior scientist at the KGS in 2009 and Distiguished Professor in 2014.

== Odyssey Geoarchaeological Research Program ==
In 2003, Mandel became the first director of the Odyssey Geoarchaeological Research Program endowed by Joseph and Ruth Kramer at the Kansas Geological Survey of the University of Kansas. Its primary goal is “to search for evidence of the earliest people to inhabit the Central Great Plains and western portions of the Midwest, and to gain a better understanding of late the Pleistocene and early Holocene paleoenvironments that affected those people”. This is done through the KGS's Isotope Preparation Laboratory and Geoarchaeology and Paleoenvironmental Research Lab, in addition to field work in Kansas, Nebraska, Colorado, South Dakota, and Missouri. The program funds a number of thesis and dissertation research related to Paleo-Indian archaeology and geoarchaeology in addition to supporting graduate and undergraduate students involved in summer field investigations.

== Major projects ==
In 1981, Mandel participated in an archaeological survey and geoarchaeological investigation in Libya near El-Kharga, the southernmost oasis in Egypt’s Western Desert, on the southern edge of the Libyan Plateau. In 1982, he undertook geoarchaeological investigations at ‘Ain Ghazal, a Pre-Pottery Neolithic B village in Amman, Jordan. During the mid- to late 1980s, Mandel focused on Holocene landscape evolution in the Central Plains, seeking to determinie how erosion and alluviation in stream basins shape the archaeological record. He undertook large-scale archeological surveys that included geoarchaeological investigations along Lake Creek in southeastern Texas, the Brazos River basin in north-central Texas, the Smoky Hill River basin in north-central Kansas, and the Pawnee River basin in southwestern Kansas. He also undertook research on the geoarchaeology of Akrotiri-Aetokremnos (Site E), a rockshelter with the earliest evidence of people on Cyprus. During the 1990s, Mandel worked on the Logan Creek site in northeastern Nebraska, Watson Break in northeastern Louisiana, the Big Eddy Site in southwestern Missouri, the Richard Beene site in south-central Texas, and Movie Draw rockshelter in the Black Hills of southwestern South Dakota.

As director of the Odyssey Archaeological Research Program, he turned his attention to the peopling of the Americas with an initial focus on the Great Plains. He undertook research at the Kanorado, Claussen, Coffey, Ray Long, Magic Mountain, Beacon Island, and the Brookings and Scheuerman mammoth sites. In 2019, he launched a reinvestigation of Bluefish Caves in the Yukon Territory of Canada, and multi-year studies of the San Esteban rockshelter and the Genevieve Lykes Duncan (GLD) site in the Big Bend region of Southwest Texas.

Mandel also conducted geoarchaeological investigations at the Hopewell Ceremonial Earthworks in southern Ohio, Ais Giorkis in Cyprus, and Mesolithic sites along the Danube River in the Iron Gates region of eastern Serbia. Some of his research during that time also included contributing to a team studying the cultural landscape and qanat system of southern Afghanistan’s Kandahar Province using remote sensing techniques.

From 2020 to 2023, he led a study that used stable carbon isotope values of organic carbon in buried alluvial soils to reconstruct Holocene and late Pleistocene bioclimatic change in the Tallgrass prairie of northeastern Kansas. Since 2018, Mandel has been involved with a paleoenvironmental study of Holocene and terminal Pleistocene sedimentary deposits in Parker’s Pit, a natural trap cave in the Black Hills of South Dakota. In 2026, he completed a study of late-Quaternary landscape evolution in river valleys of the Nebraska Sandhills. His current research includes defining the lithostratigraphy of Holocene and terminal Pleistocene alluvium in the Big Bend region of Southwest Texas.

== Awards and honors ==
Mandel was elected Fellow of the Geological Society of America (GSA) in 2003. He received the George R. “Rip” Rapp Award (2003) for outstanding contributions to the interdisciplinary field of archaeological geology and the Kirk Bryan Award for Excellence (2010). The University of Kansas awarded Mandel the John C. Wright Graduate Mentor Award (2009), the Center for Teaching Excellence Award (2011), and Irvin E. Youngberg Research Achievement Award (2012).

In 2007, Mandel was elected President of the American Quaternary Association (AMQUA). In 2012, the National Academy of Sciences appointed Mandel Chair of the U.S. National Committee for the International Quaternary Congress, a position he held until 2020.

== Selected publications ==
- Mandel, Rolfe D.; Layzell, Anthony L.; Hanson, Paul R. (2026). "Late Quaternary landscape evolution in river valleys of the Nebraska Sand Hills, USA". Quaternary Science Reviews. 388 110058. Bibcode:2026QSRv..38810058M. doi:10.1016/j.quascirev.2026.110058.
- Mandel, Rolfe D.; Simmons, Alan H. (2022). "'Ain Ghazal, Jordan". Encyclopedia of Geoarchaeology. Encyclopedia of Earth Sciences Series. pp. 1–3. doi:10.1007/978-3-030-44600-0_66-1. ISBN 978-3-030-44600-0.
- Mandel, Rolfe D.; Simmons, Alan H. (2022). "Akrotiri Aetokremnos, Cyprus". Encyclopedia of Geoarchaeology. Encyclopedia of Earth Sciences Series. pp. 1–2. doi:10.1007/978-3-030-44600-0_67-1. ISBN 978-3-030-44600-0.
- Mandel, Rolfe D.; Goldberg, Paul; Holliday, Vance T. (2022). "Site Formation Processes". Encyclopedia of Geoarchaeology. Encyclopedia of Earth Sciences Series. pp. 1–20. doi:10.1007/978-3-030-44600-0_147-1. ISBN 978-3-030-44600-0.
- Mandel, R.D.; Cummings, L. Scott (2023). "Geoarchaeology and Paleoenvironmental Context of Ais Giorkis". In Simmons, Alan H. (ed.). From the Mountains to the Sea: Ais Giorkis, an Early Neolithic Hamlet in the Troodos Foothills of Western Cyprus. Astrom Editions. pp. 123–149. ISBN 978-9925-7935-5-6.
- Mandel, Rolfe D.; Joyce Seals, Leila M.; Layzell, Anthony L. (2024). "Holocene and late Pleistocene bioclimatic change inferred from δ13C of organic carbon in buried alluvial soils in the tallgrass prairie, northeastern Kansas". Catena. 236 107733. doi:10.1016/j.catena.2023.107733.
- Mandel, Rolfe D.; Thoms, Alston V.; Nordt, Lee C.; Jacob, John S. (2018). "Geoarchaeology and paleoecology of the deeply stratified Richard Beene site, Medina River valley, South-Central Texas, USA". Quaternary International. 463: 176–197. Bibcode:2018QuInt.463..176M. doi:10.1016/j.quaint.2017.09.009.
- Mandel, Rolfe D.; Murphy, Laura R.; Mitchell, Mark D. (2014). "Geoarchaeology and paleoenvironmental context of the Beacon Island site, an Agate Basin (Paleoindian) bison kill in northwestern North Dakota, USA". Quaternary International. 342: 91–113. Bibcode:2014QuInt.342...91M. doi:10.1016/j.quaint.2014.06.073.
- Mandel, Rolfe D. (2008). "Buried paleoindian-age landscapes in stream valleys of the central plains, USA". Geomorphology. 101 (1–2): 342–361. Bibcode:2008Geomo.101..342M. doi:10.1016/j.geomorph.2008.05.031.
- Simmons, Alan H.; Mandel, Rolfe D. (2007). "How Old is the Human Presence on Cyprus?". Science. 317 (5845): 1679. doi:10.1126/science.317.5845.1679. PMID 17885113.
- Mandel, R.D., J.S. Jacob, and L.C. Nordt, 2007. Geoarchaeology of the Richard Beene Site. In Archaeological and Paleoecological Investigations at the Richard Beene Site (41BX831), South Central Texas, edited by A.V. Thoms and R.D. Mandel, pp. 27–60. Center for Ecological Archaeology, Reports of Investigations No. 8, Texas A&M University, College Station, Texas.
- Mandel, R.D. (Editor), 2006. Guidebook of the 18th Biennial Meeting of the American Quaternary Association. Technical Series 21, Kansas Geological Survey, University of Kansas, Lawrence.
- Mandel, R.D., 2006. The Effects of Late Quaternary Landscape Evolution on the Archaeology of Kansas. In Kansas Archaeology, edited by R.J. Hoard and W.E. Banks, pp. 46–75. University Press of Kansas, Lawrence, Kansas.
- Mandel, R.D., S. Holen, and J.L. Hofman, 2005. Geoarchaeology of Clovis and Potential Pre-Clovis Cultural Deposits at the Kanorado Locality, Northwestern Kansas. Current Research in the Pleistocene 22:56-57.
- Mandel, Rolfe D.; Hofman, Jack L. (2003). "Geoarchaeological investigations at the Winger site: A Late Paleoindian bison bonebed in southwestern Kansas, U.S.A.". Geoarchaeology. 18 (1): 129–144. Bibcode:2003Gearc..18..129M. doi:10.1002/gea.10054.
- Mandel, Rolfe D.; Simmons, Alan H. (2001). "Prehistoric occupation of Late Quaternary landscapes near Kharga Oasis, Western Desert of Egypt". Geoarchaeology. 16 (1): 95–117. Bibcode:2001Gearc..16...95M. doi:10.1002/1520-6548(200101)16:1<95::AID-GEA7>3.0.CO;2-K.
- Mandel, Rolfe D.; Bettis, E. Arthur (2001). "Use and Analysis of Soils by Archaeologists and Geoscientists: A North American Perspective". Earth Sciences and Archaeology. pp. 173–204. doi:10.1007/978-1-4615-1183-0_7. ISBN 978-1-4613-5433-8.
- Mandel, R.D., 2000. The History of Geoarchaeological Research in the Central Plains of Kansas and Northern Oklahoma. In Geoarchaeology in the Great Plains, edited by R.D. Mandel, pp. 79–136. University of Oklahoma Press, Norman.
- Mandel, Rolfe (1998). "Archaeological geology". Geotimes. 43 (2): 43–50.
- Mandel, Rolfe D.; Simmons, Alan H. (1997). "Geoarchaeology of the AkrotiriAetokremnos rockshelter, Southern Cyprus". Geoarchaeology. 12 (6): 567–605. Bibcode:1997Gearc..12..567M. doi:10.1002/(SICI)1520-6548(199709)12:6<567::AID-GEA4>3.0.CO;2-X.
- Mandel, Rolfe D. (1995). "Geomorphic controls of the Archaic record in the Central Plains of the United States". Archaeological Geology of the Archaic Period in North America. Geological Society of America Special Papers. Vol. 297. pp. 37–66. doi:10.1130/SPE297-p37. ISBN 0-8137-2297-7.
- Mandel, Rolfe D. (1994). "Holocene landscape evolution in the Pawnee River valley, southwestern Kansas". Bulletin (Kansas Geological Survey) (236): 1–164. doi:10.17161/kgsbulletin.no.236.20440.
- Mandel, R.D., 1992. Soils and Holocene Landscape Evolution in Central and Southwestern Kansas: Implications for Archaeological Research. In Soils in Archaeology:Landscape Evolution and Human Occupation, Vance T. Holliday, editor, pp. 41–100. Smithsonian Institution Press, Washington, D.C.
- Mandel, R.D. and A.H. Simmons, 1988. A Preliminary Assessment of the Geomorphology of ‘Ain Ghazal’. In The Prehistory of Jordan. Gerrard and H. Gebel, editors, pp. 431–436, B.A.R. International Series 396(i), Oxford, England.
- Mandel, Rolfe D.; Sorenson, Curtis J. (1982). "The Role of the Western Harvester Ant (Pogonomyrmex occidentalis) in Soil Formation". Soil Science Society of America Journal. 46 (4): 785–788. Bibcode:1982SSASJ..46..785M. doi:10.2136/sssaj1982.03615995004600040024x.
