= Sunset, Missouri =

Unincorporated community in Missouri, U.S.

Coordinates: 37°33′04″N 93°18′28″W

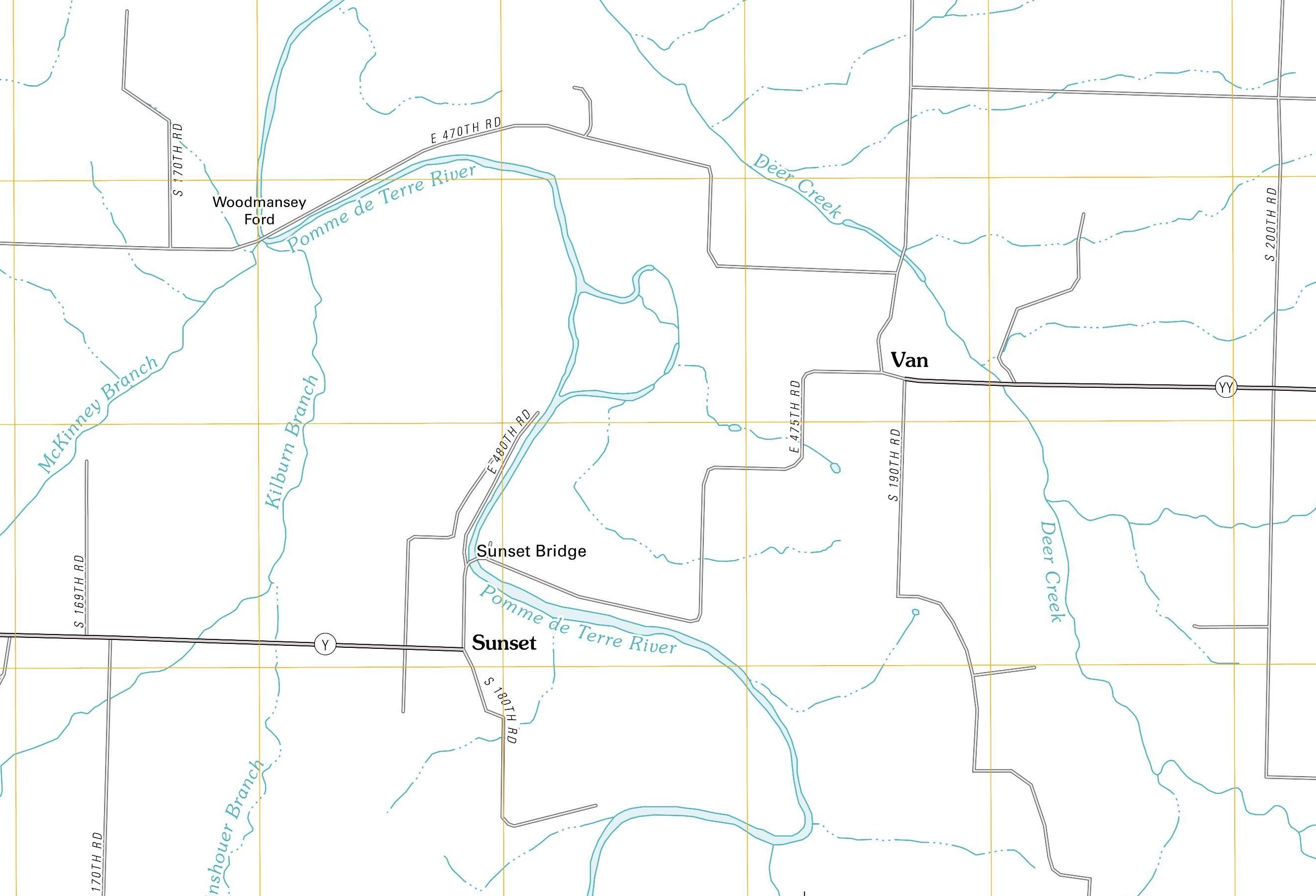
Location of Sunset on 2011 USGS map, Cedar Vista Quadrangle.

Sunset is a rural unincorporated community in Polk County, in the U.S. state of Missouri, located southeast of the county seat in Bolivar.

== History ==
A post office called Sunset was established in 1888, and remained in operation until 1900. The name Sunset most likely is a transfer from another American place of the same name.

According to Place Names in Southwest Counties of Missouri (1930), "Sunet was the fanciful name given to a little store and post office about forty years ago. It was probably named from one of the seven other Sunsets in the United States."

Sunset Bridge, which crosses the Pomme de Terre River, was the first "iron" bridge in Polk County, with its first iteration constructed in 1885. The current Sunset Bridge span was protected by a bank stabilization project in 2016. Since 2001 the bridge has been decorated with artwork and kept free of graffiti by students from Halfway High School.

The Sunset Park Access is a popular park to access the river for boating and fishing and has a boat ramp. The river is considered a good place for novice canoeists.
