= Rimby, Missouri =

Unincorporated community in Missouri, U.S.

Coordinates: 37°45′36″N 93°14′12″W

Rimby is an unincorporated community in northeastern Polk County, in the U.S. state of Missouri. The community is on Missouri Route 64, between Louisburg, approximately five miles to the east and Mohawk Corner, about three miles to the west.

== History ==
A post office called Rimby was established in 1897, and remained in operation until 1915. The community was named after W. B. Rimby, a local merchant.
