= Piper Creek =

Piper Creek may refer to:

- Piper Creek (Alberta), a tributary of Waskasoo Creek
- Piper Creek (Missouri), a tributary of the Pomme de Terre River
