= Hosea T. Botts =

American attorney and politician

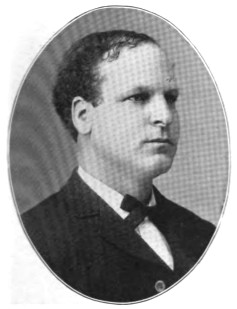
- Botts circa 1910

Mayor of Tillamook, Oregon
- In office 1905–1907

Tillamook County Assistant District Attorney
- In office 1915–1916

Personal details
- Born: 1873 Novelty, Missouri, US
- Died: 1963 (aged 89–90) Tillamook, Oregon, US
- Party: Republican
- Education: University of Missouri
- Profession: attorney

Hosea Thompson Botts (1873–1963) was an American attorney and politician who served as Mayor of Tillamook, Oregon from 1905 to 1907, spanning two terms.

== Biography ==
Hosea T. Botts was born in Novelty, Missouri on June 8, 1873, to Benjamin and Mary C. Botts. He attended Oaklawn College and later the University of Missouri for law school. By 1900 he was living in Knox, Missouri working as an attorney.

In 1901, Botts moved to Oregon where he applied and was seated to the Oregon State Bar. In his first year in Oregon, Botts had a partnership B. L. Eddy which ended shortly thereafter. Botts was swept into office with other prohibition candidates in Tillamook, Oregon in 1905 after defeating R.W. Watson, who The Oregonian dubbed "the saloon candidate". Botts ran for re-election unopposed in 1906. The Oregonian noted there was little opposition to the prohibition beliefs of Botts. As mayor he participated in a ceremonial event celebrating the beginning of construction on the Tillamook span of the Pacific Railway and Navigation Company railway. In November 1907, Botts dismissed two fines levied against men who were arrested at a gambling establishment because according to Botts they proved that they had not been gambling at the time of the raid by Tillamook County Sheriff Hank Crenshaw.

Following his mayoral tenure, Botts stayed active in local politics as the president of the Tillamook Development League in 1908. As president he promoted the construction of roads throughout the county. Along with George B. Lamb and Carl Haberlach, Botts incorporated the Tillamook Lumber Manufacturing Company in 1908 with $10,000 in stock. Their previous venture was destroyed by a fire. The following year he incorporated the Mason, Pennington Company with $20,000 in operating stock with Homer Mason and A. A. Pennington.

At the commencement for the class of 1911 seniors at Nehalem High School in Nehalem, Oregon, Botts was the guest speaker.

In 1912, Botts was nominated by the Republican Party to be the Oregon State Senate District 22 which represented Lincoln, Tillamook and Washington counties. He was running against incumbent W. H. Hollis, a Democrat.

Botts was nominated to run against incumbent mayor John R. Harter in 1912, but would go on to lose the race.

Tillamook County District Attorney T. H. Goyne appointed Botts to the office of Assistant District Attorney in 1915.

Botts was one of the three incorporators of the Wheeler Development Company in August 1919 with an initial capital stock of $20,000. The following year Botts joined First National Bank of Tillamook as their vice-president, serving alongside David Kuratli. Botts had previously served in that same capacity for the same bank in 1910.
