= Wishart Township, Polk County, Missouri =

Inactive township in the US state of Missouri

Coordinates: 37.5222°N 93.4625°W

Wishart Township is an inactive township in Polk County, in the U.S. state of Missouri.

Wishart Township takes its name from the community of Wishart, Missouri.
