= Piper Creek (Missouri) =

Stream in the American state of Missouri

Piper Creek is a stream in Polk County in the Ozarks of southwest Missouri. It is a tributary of the Pomme de Terre River.

The stream headwaters are located at 37°33′35″N 93°24′14″W and the confluence is at 37°40′45″N 93°24′19″W. The stream source arises as an intermittent stream along Missouri Route Y just east of the community of Karlin. The stream flows east and northeast passing under Missouri Route 13 and then Missouri Route 32 about two miles east of Bolivar. The stream continues its flow to the north-northwest passing under Missouri Route D to its confluence with the Pomme de Terre about four miles north of Bolivar.

Piper Creek has the name of the local Piper family.

== See also ==
- List of rivers of Missouri
