= Aldrich, Missouri =

- Village
- Village of Aldrich
- Location of Aldrich, Missouri
- Coordinates: 37°32′57″N 93°33′05″W
- Country: United States
- State: Missouri
- County: Polk
- Incorporated: 1889

Area
  - Total: 0.16 sq mi (0.42 km^{2})
  - Land: 0.16 sq mi (0.42 km^{2})
  - Water: 0 sq mi (0.00 km^{2})
- Elevation: 984 ft (300 m)

Population (2020)
  - Total: 76
  - Density: 468.1/sq mi (180.75/km^{2})
- Time zone: UTC-6 (Central (CST))
  - Summer (DST): UTC-5 (CDT)
- ZIP code: 65601
- Area code: 417
- FIPS code: 29-00568
- GNIS feature ID: 2397926

Aldrich is a village in southwestern Polk County, Missouri, United States. As of the 2020 census, Aldrich had a population of 76. It is part of the Springfield, Missouri Metropolitan Statistical Area.

== History ==
Aldrich was laid out in 1885 when the railroad was extended to that point. The community has the name of one Mr. Aldrich, a railroad employee. A post office called Aldrich has been in operation since 1886. The Aldrich United Methodist Church is the old church in Aldrich, founded 1888 and is still in operation.

== Geography ==
Aldrich is located on Missouri Route 123 just north of the Little Sac River prong of Stockton Lake. Fair play is approximately 5.5 miles to the north and Eudora is about 4.5 miles to the south. Bolivar is seven miles to the northeast.

According to the United States Census Bureau, the village has a total area of 0.16 square miles (0.41 km^{2}), all land.

== Demographics ==
Historical population
Census	Pop.	Note	%±
1900	189		—
1910	225		19.0%
1920	261		16.0%
1930	283		8.4%
1940	239		−15.5%
1950	198		−17.2%
1960	181		−8.6%
1970	66		−63.5%
1980	53		−19.7%
1990	76		43.4%
2000	75		−1.3%
2010	80		6.7%
2020	76		−5.0%
U.S. Decennial Census

=== 2010 census ===
As of the census of 2010, there were 80 people, 34 households, and 21 families living in the village. The population density was 500.0 inhabitants per square mile (193.1/km^{2}). There were 43 housing units at an average density of 268.8 per square mile (103.8/km^{2}). The racial makeup of the village was 96.3% White, 1.3% Native American, and 2.5% from other races. Hispanic or Latino of any race were 2.5% of the population.

There were 34 households, of which 32.4% had children under the age of 18 living with them, 50.0% were married couples living together, 8.8% had a female householder with no husband present, 2.9% had a male householder with no wife present, and 38.2% were non-families. 29.4% of all households were made up of individuals, and 8.8% had someone living alone who was 65 years of age or older. The average household size was 2.35 and the average family size was 3.00.

The median age in the village was 48 years. 25% of residents were under the age of 18; 2.6% were between the ages of 18 and 24; 16.3% were from 25 to 44; 42.6% were from 45 to 64; and 13.8% were 65 years of age or older. The gender makeup of the village was 48.8% male and 51.3% female.

=== 2000 census ===
As of the census of 2000, there were 75 people, 32 households, and 20 families living in the village. The population density was 463.8 inhabitants per square mile (179.1/km^{2}). There were 41 housing units at an average density of 253.6 per square mile (97.9/km^{2}). The racial makeup of the village was 94.67% White, and 5.33% from two or more races. Hispanic or Latino of any race were 1.33% of the population.

There were 32 households, out of which 21.9% had children under the age of 18 living with them, 65.6% were married couples living together, and 34.4% were non-families. 31.3% of all households were made up of individuals, and 9.4% had someone living alone who was 65 years of age or older. The average household size was 2.34 and the average family size was 2.90.

In the village, the population was spread out, with 22.7% under the age of 18, 13.3% from 18 to 24, 20.0% from 25 to 44, 26.7% from 45 to 64, and 17.3% who were 65 years of age or older. The median age was 36 years. For every 100 females, there were 97.4 males. For every 100 females age 18 and over, there were 100.0 males.

The median income for a household in the village was $28,125, and the median income for a family was $29,375. Males had a median income of $19,375 versus $14,688 for females. The per capita income for the village was $11,717. There were no families and 4.5% of the population living below the poverty line, including no under eighteens and none of those over 64.

== Notable residents ==
Members of the band The Ozark Mountain Daredevils lived on the Ruedi-Valley Ranch near Aldrich in their very early days.
