= West Bend =

West Bend may refer to the following:

== Places ==
=== Canada ===
- West Bend, Saskatchewan

=== United States ===
- West Bend, Iowa
- West Bend, Missouri
- West Bend, Wisconsin
  - West Bend Municipal Airport
  - West Bend School District, Wisconsin
- West Bend (town), Wisconsin

== Companies ==
- West Bend Company
