= South Morgan Township, Dade County, Missouri =

Township in Missouri, U.S.

Coordinates: 37°29′11″N 93°40′26″W

South Morgan Township is a township in Dade County, in the U.S. state of Missouri. It is also a voting precinct.

Morgan Township was named for Adonijah Morgan by Dr. William Mathews, who sold his farm to Mr. Morgan upon the arrival of the latter in 1836.

Maze Creek flows through this township.
