= Stinking Pond Hollow =

Stream valley in the American state of Missouri

Stinking Pond Hollow is a stream valley in eastern Oregon County in the U.S. state of Missouri. The stream is a tributary to the Eleven Point River.

The stream source is at 36°47′58″N 91°14′22″W, and its confluence is at 36°45′40″N 91°15′26″W.

Stinking Pond Hollow earned its name due to the presence of a frequently foul-smelling pond within its boundaries.

== See also ==
- Stinking Creek (Pomme de Terre River) (in Missouri)
