= King Branch =

Stream in Polk County, Missouri

King Branch is a stream in western Polk County in the U.S. state of Missouri. It is a tributary of Turkey Creek.

The headwaters arise at 37°27′12″N 93°37′08″W and the confluence with Turkey Creek is at 37°30′56″N 93°35′32″W.

King Branch has the name of the local King family.

== See also ==
- List of rivers of Missouri
