= Big Eddy Site =

Archaeological site in Missouri, United States

- Location within Missouri
- 37°43′13.76″N 93°42′58.07″W
- Periods: Archaic to the Mississippian period
- Location: Stockton, Missouri, Cedar County, Missouri, United States
- Region: Cedar County, Missouri

The Big Eddy Site (23CE426) is an archaeological site located in Cedar County, Missouri, which was first excavated in 1997 and is now threatened due to erosion by the Sac River.

== Location and general description ==
The Sac River has created a cut bank, some 5.2 meters high, revealing a rare site similar to the Rodgers Formation of the neighboring Pomme de Terre valley (Lopinot et al. 1998:39-40). Haynes (1976:58-59) describes the deposits in the area of Rodgers Cave as flood plain deposits which have accumulated slowly through annual flooding. Periodically, the river would downcut deeply enough to prevent further flooding, only to change its course later and restart the process. This leaves a series of easily identified layers, separated by periods of no deposits. Big Eddy was formed in a similar way. For some 14,000 years, the Sac River has gently flooded, covering over this site with thick, well stratified, alluvial silt (Bush 2006).

This detailed stratigraphy has preserved a record of a nearly continuous human occupation from recent prehistory back to the earliest Clovis, and possibly pre-Clovis residents. Recovered artifacts show a continuum from Paleoindian through Archaic, Woodland, and Mississippian, including perhaps important evidence for the transition from the Clovis to Dalton cultures (Chandler 2001a; Joiner 2001).

Making the site even more valuable is the clear separation of deposits. The site was periodically sealed by gravel layers and paleosols, ancient soils preserved by burial under more recent sedimentation. These layers, often of very hard material, effectively seal the layers, preventing intrusion into the lower layers by later material. The paleosols are particularly valuable as they were formed by environmental changes that create a change in the soil forming a hard shell over the lower material.

== Site history ==
Investigations at the Big Eddy site are quite recent, having been first excavated in 1997, and this area of the state has seen very little previous investigation. The only other extensive study of the region took place in the 1960s and 1970s in the neighboring lower Pomme de Terre Valley (Missouri State University's Center for Archaeological Research (CAR) 2006; Lopinot et al. 1998:39; Ray et al. 1998:73-74). These studies provided a geologic history for the region reaching back some 100,000 years. A long sequence of human occupation was also found, but no evidence of Paleoindian sites.

In the 1970s, with the construction of the Stockton hydroelectric dam, the Sac River, which had for so long preserved the site, began to erode the bank (CAR 2006). This exposed the alluvial layers and began to wash out artifacts from the nearly 14,000 year occupation. Local collectors recovered some of these artifacts, which drew the attention of professional archaeologists. In 1986, the site was finally discovered by professional archaeologists surveying the Sac River valley when they spotted artifacts eroding out of the river bank (Bush 2006; Chandler 2001a; Joiner 2001).

No formal investigation of Big Eddy was conducted until 1997. At this time, the Kansas City District US Army Corps of Engineers came to realize that this site was in imminent danger of destruction by the water releases from the Stockton dam. The Corps hired the Missouri State University's Center for Archaeological Research (CAR) to excavate the site, funding three years of work at the site (Bush 2006; CAR 2006; Joiner 2001).

The CAR team, led by Ray and Lopinot, came to the site with modest expectations. Excavations began with the use of a road grader to remove the plow zone from the site. This material was screened and flotation was used to look for cultural remains (Chandler 2001a). Two test trenches were then dug to a depth of four meters, and four blocks were excavated in 5–10 cm layers to a depth of 2.5 meters. Eighteen deep, continuous sedimentary cores were also taken around the site (Chandler 2001a; Ray et al. 1998:74). This work revealed a much more valuable site than had first been expected and tedious hand excavation techniques were used to investigate the lower levels to maintain contextual information (Chandler 2001a). The 1997 excavations terminated near the base of the Paleoindian deposits at about 3.5 meters below the original surface. Exploratory tests, though, revealed even deeper artifacts, manuports (natural objects moved by human action), and charcoal down to depths of four meters. Dating of these finds were between 12,700 and 13,000 years BP (Ray et al. 2000:68).

After a hiatus during which they examined the previous years findings, work at the site resumed in the summer of 1999. Hand excavations were made an additional 1.3 meters into the pre-Clovis deposits, finally reaching a paleo-gravel bar (Ray et al. 2000:68-69). It was during these excavations that some of the most exciting discoveries were made, possible pre-Clovis artifacts. If confirmed, these finds could be the oldest in North America. Work ended in 2007.

In total, the US Army Corps of Engineers has now funded five years of excavations, and CAR has returned to the site through summer of 2006. The team hopes to continue their work through private funding before the river consumes the site.

== Stratigraphy ==
One of the most important aspects of Big Eddy is that the stratigraphy of the site is clear and has remained virtually undisturbed for over 14,000 years. As a result, the deposits from different periods have been separated vertically from each other (CAR 2006; Chandler 2001a). The stratigraphy of Big Eddy has been compared to the geology of Rodgers Cave in the neighboring Pomme de Terre Valley. Big Eddy has thus been divided into three distinct alluvial members; Early Rodgers, Middle Rodgers, and Late Rodgers (Lopinot et al. 1998:74-75). The Late Rodgers layer represents the most recent deposits. Most of this layer has been disturbed by the plow zone, especially at the east end of the site. The west end of the site retains some undisturbed deposits (Ray et al. 1998:74).

Mississippian and Woodland Period: The deposits from these periods can be found in the top foot or so of the Late Rodgers deposits, and date from approximately 500 to 2,500 years BP (CAR 2006). While much of this layer has been disturbed by plowing, the west end of the site has maintained its proper stratigraphy. Maple wood charcoal found in this area has given uncorrected dates of 760+/-70 BP. Kings Corner-Notched points, known at Middle Woodland sites associated with the Hopewell tradition, have also been recovered (Ray et al. 1998:74-76).

Late Archaic Period: Excavating deeper into the Late Rodgers layer (Lopinot et al. 1998:76), 1 to 2.5 feet (0.76 m) below the surface, remains can be found of the Late Archaic period, dating from 2,500 to 5,500 years BP (CAR 2006). A number of lithic tools and points have been recovered from this period, including Sedalia complex points and knives of nonheat-treated Jefferson City chert. A midden deposit at 2.3 to 2.6 meters below the surface has yielded Williams Corner-Notched bifaces. Additional finds have included animal and plant remains, nutting stones, metates, faceted hematite, and stone tools of heat-treated Burlington chert. Uncorrected AMS dates have given results of 4020+/-80 years BP (Ray et al. 1998:77). Middle to Early Archaic Periods: Below the Late Archaic are Middle Archaic deposits extending to a depth of two meters. Little has been published covering a time period of 5,500 to 8,000 years BP (CAR 2006).

These periods are found within the Middle Rodgers layers of the site, which extend through the Early Archaic period deposits. The Early Archaic artifacts are found just above Paleosol 1, which divides the Middle and Early Rodgers alluvial layers (Ray et al. 1998:77). Many different tool types have been identified here, including Graham Cave, Cache River, Rice Lancelate, Rice Lobed, and Jackie Stemmed projectile points (Ray et al. 1998:77). Most of these points have been found out of context, on the cutbank, but some have been found in situ from 2.1 to 2.8 meters below the surface.

Dalton and San Patrice Cultures: Below the Middle Rodgers is a hard layer called Paleosol 1, 2.9 to 3.2 meters below the surface. This layer effectively seals the site below the Late Archaic. Within the Paleosol itself are found artifacts from the Dalton and San Patrice Cultures (Lopinot et al. 1998:40-41; Ray et al. 1998:77-78). While several points have been found on the cutbank, three San Patrice and two Dalton points have been found in situ. Also found was the debitage from what appears to have been a lithic workshop, with many flakes and broken performs (Chandler 2001a; Lopinot et al. 1998:40-41; Ray et al. 1998:77-78). Charcoal samples have allowed dating of the layer to be performed. The upper part of the Paleosol AMS dates to 10,185+/-75 years BP, the central portion to 10,400+/-75 years BP, and the basal portion to 10,470+/-80 and 11,280+/-75 years BP (Lopinot et al. 1998:40). There may have been as many as five cultures at Big Eddy during this period as possible Packard and Plainview points have also been found, but out of context (CAR 2006; Ray et al. 1998:77).

Clovis Culture: The Big Eddy is perhaps the only well-stratified site bridging the Dalton/Clovis transition (CAR 2006). It is hoped that the site may provide more insight into this boundary when a sudden change in lithic technologies occurs following the megafauna extinction of North America.

Below Paleosol 1 is the alluvial layer, Early Rodgers. The Early Rodgers layer is a 2.2 meter thick layer of silty clay loam, grading down to a sandy loam and overlying a gravel lens at 3.9 meters (Lopinot et al. 1998:40; Ray et al. 1998:78). Artifacts and radio carbon dating indicate a date range of 10,000 to 13,000 years BP (Ray et al. 1998:78). The evidence for a Clovis occupation at this site comes from two artifacts. The first is a fluted point identified as Gainey type found at 3.30 to 3.31 meters below the surface (Lopinot et al. 1998:41; Ray et al. 1998:78). Dating of this point, based on charcoal found in proximity below the point is 10,710+/-85 and 10,940+/-80 years BP (Ray et al. 1998:78). Another Clovis artifact is a blade which was found at 3.33 meters.

Pre-Clovis evidence at the Big Eddy: While all of this discussion has been very interesting and useful, it is not what has made the Big Eddy famous. The 1997 dig went to the base of the Clovis material, but deeper samples had revealed intriguing hints of even older occupations at lower levels. The team returned in 1999 with the intent of investigating those clues more thoroughly. What has been found may be some of the oldest artifacts ever found in North America, but they remain controversial due to the lack of clear human action on them.

Well below the Gainey point, at a depth of 3.7 to 3.8 meters were found three large cobbles identified as manuports and three flakes (Lopinot et al. 1998:41). Given that their size is much larger than other material deposited by the river and the small grain of the surrounding soil, it has been judged doubtful that they were moved to this location by the river, but natural action cannot be ruled out entirely.

At 3.9 meters, a gravel lens seals the site, with all deeper material being pre-Clovis in age (Lopinot et al. 1998:41). Two finds below this level have thrown the spotlight onto the Big Eddy site. One is a large tabular stone, possibly an anvil stone, broken into three pieces and the other is a large cobble (Bush 2006; Chandler 2001b; Ray et al. 2000). Both of these artifacts display evidence of possible human modification. In addition, the gravel layer contains many flakes.

The evidence remains ambiguous, though compelling. Lopinot and Ray remain hopefully skeptical about their finds and have subjected them to experimentation and scrutiny. The flakes found in the gravel layer may be created by the actions of animals. Using experimental archaeology, similar chert pebbles were subjected to the traffic of African elephants. This "foot traffic" fractured the pebbles and created debitage and flakes very similar to those found at the site. Some flake types present in the Pre-Clovis level, though, were notably absent from the experimental results; interior flakes and biface thinning flakes (Chandler 2001b).

The possible anvil stone has received a great deal of scrutiny. This is a very large stone: 4.5 kg in weight, 21.6 cm long, 15 cm wide, and 12 cm thick. It is much larger than any other stones at this level (Ray 2000:69). Using the Sac River, experiments were conducted to determine if the stone could have been moved to this position by the river. Even during water discharges from the Stockton dam, the stone failed to be moved by the water. Ray and Lopinot have thus concluded that it is most likely a manuport, though other transport methods such as root wad rafting (trapped in floating tree roots) and ice-rafting can not be entirely ruled out (Chandler 2001b). One other curious feature regarding the stone's location is that the stone is broken into three pieces, situated very close together. One end of the stone is broken off, with a spall from the break. The broken piece is rotated 120 degrees from its original position and would be at a right angle to the flow of the water had its relocation been through water action. In addition, the spall, which is from the upper surface of the stone, is under the smaller piece. This is highly suggestive of the piece being deliberately moved after the break occurred (Ray 2000:69).

Additional signs of modification on the stone include a pitted area at the point of fracture and percussion scars on the edges of the smaller fragment (Ray 2000:69). Three use-wear specialists have been consulted. Tom Dillehay of the Monte Verde site states that micro-use-wear analysis shows that the stone is manmade. Marvin Kay, a lithics expert from the University of Arkansas, and Stanley Ahler, a micro-use-wear investigator, both believe the modifications to be the result of natural actions (Ray 2000:70; Chandler 2001b).

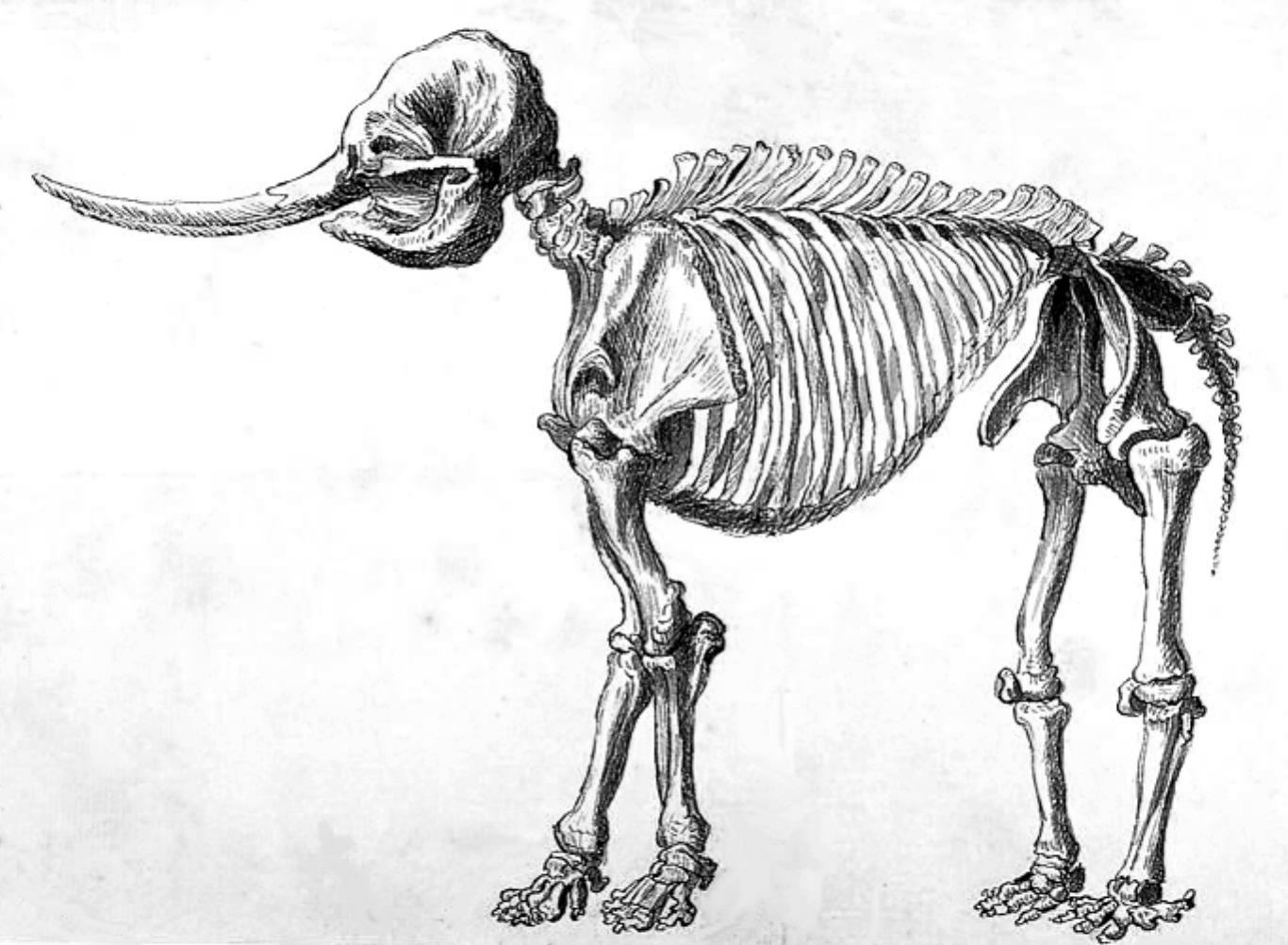
Drawing of a mastodon skeleton by Rembrandt Peale

The possible hammerstone has undergone similar scrutiny with identical results. Evidence of modification to this stone included seven cones of percussion, all limited to a single poll of the stone, possibly indicating that it was used as a hammer (Ray 2000:70). While it is impossible to determine if these objects were ever used together, Ray and Lopinot argue that they were likely used to smash the bones of mastodons and other large game. They compare these to similar artifacts found at other suspected pre-Clovis sites such as Cooperton, Oklahoma; Bonfire Shelter, Texas; and the Lamb Spring site in Colorado (Ray 2000:70). The evidence for a pre-Clovis occupation at the Big Eddy remains an area of speculation. To date, no clearly humanly modified object has been found below the Clovis strata of the site. It is hoped that future work will find more conclusive proof of early occupation.

== Dating of the site ==
One of the issues with many pre-Clovis sites that have been tentatively identified is the lack of secure dating. One of the remarkable features of this site is how well stratified it is. Layer upon layer of silt has been laid down over the millennia, and periodic sealing has locked the deposits in an easily dated context. Aware of the significance of their finds, Ray and Lopinot have taken great care in excavating and documenting the site.

Secure dating of Paleoindian sites is rare, but the team at Big Eddy has been able to obtain 15 dates from charcoal at Paleoindian levels of the strata (CAR 2006). Just above the Paleosol, Early Archaic artifacts have been found with charcoal that yielded an uncorrected AMS date of 9,525+/-65 years BP (Lopinot et al. 1998:40).

Within the Paleosol itself, charcoal in close association with the San Patrice points has been AMS dated to 10,185+/-75 BP (Lopinot et al. 1998:40; Ray et al. 1998:77). Lower still in the Paleosol have come three other dates, all uncorrected; 10,400+/-75, 10,470+/-80, and 11,280+/-75 years BP (Lopinot et al. 1998:40).

Below the Paleosol, in the Early Rodgers layer, charcoal was also found within 2 cm of the Gainey/Clovis point. The uncorrected AMS date of this piece was found to be 10,710+/-85 years BP (Ray et al. 1998:78). Clovis occupation is believed to extend to 3.55 meters, but five more dates have been obtained from material at even greater depths: 3.58 meters, 3.64 meters, 3.75 meters, 3.83 meters, and 3.86 meters. The dates obtained for these samples are 12,320+/-130 years BP, 11,930+/-110 years BP, 12,250+/-100 years BP, 11,375+/-80 years BP, and 12,590+/-85 years BP respectively. These dates are all AMS uncorrected (Ray 2000:69). Even if pre-Clovis evidence remains elusive, the excellent dating at the site has provided extremely valuable information about the climate of the region through time. Different climate conditions promote different kinds of plant growth. These different flora leave different carbon signatures in the soil which can be analyzed to determine the sorts of plants living at Big Eddy at different times. By tying C3 and C4 analysis of the site to these dates, the climate of the entire region can be determined.

== Reasons for occupation ==
In the archaeological record of the Big Eddy site, we see a nearly continuous occupation of 13,000 to 14,000 years. Early Americans likely returned here due to the available resources at the site. Situated at the border of the Ozark forest and the prairie lands (Chandler 2001a; Lopinot et al. 1998:39; Ray 1998:73, 2000:68), this site provided rich resources from multiple sources; the forest, the plains, and the river. This would have provided a wide range of different food sources for any inhabitants.

During pre-Clovis and Clovis occupations, local hunters would have been able to find bountiful hunting. Game would have included mastodon, tapir, ground sloth, deer, giant beaver, and horse (Chandler 2001a). Later occupants, during the Holocene, would have been able to subsist on white-tailed deer, small game, mussels, fish, waterfowl, and edible aquatic plants (Chandler 2001a, CAR 2006).

In addition to good food resources, material for tools was also readily available. Several different kinds of chert were available in the area. It could be found readily in the gravel bars of the river, and also in the slopes of the surrounding bluffs (Chandler 2001a, CAR 2006).

== The future of the Big Eddy ==
For 14,000 years, the regular flooding of the Sac River has sealed and preserved this site. Now, each time the Stockton hydroelectric dam releases water, it cuts away at the bank. That bank is now just 10 feet (3.0 m) from the site, and eroding that bank at the startling rate of 4 feet (1.2 m) per year (Bush 2006; Joiner 2001). In only a few years, the site will be gone.

Since 1997, Ray and Lopinot have worked 5 seasons at the site, the most recent in the summer of 2006, trying to save what they can before it is lost forever. In addition to the organized digs, they come here to work weekends whenever they can. Funding from the Army Corps of Engineers has now run out, and the CAR is seeking donations from individuals and corporations to continue the work.
