= Flemington Township, Polk County, Missouri =

Inactive township in the US state of Missouri

Coordinates: 37.7744°N 93.4883°W

Flemington Township is an inactive township in Polk County, in the U.S. state of Missouri.

Flemington Township takes its name from Flemington, Missouri.
