= Dunnegan, Missouri =

Unincorporated community in Missouri, U.S.

Coordinates: 37°42′29″N 93°34′37″W

Dunnegan is an unincorporated community in western Polk County, Missouri, United States. It is located on Route 123, approximately five miles north of Fair Play and 5.5 miles south of to Humansville.

The community is part of the Springfield, Missouri Metropolitan Statistical Area. The ZIP Code for Dunnegan is 65640.

== History ==
Dunnegan was originally called Dunnegan Springs, and under the latter name was laid out in 1885 when the railroad was extended to that point. The community has the name of Judge T. H. B. Dunnegan, a local judge. A post office called Dunnegan has been in operation since 1886.
