= Hominy Creek (Pomme de Terre River tributary) =

Stream in Missouri, United States

Hominy Creek is a stream in Dallas and Polk counties in the Ozarks of southwest Missouri. It is a tributary of the Pomme de Terre River.

The stream headwaters are located in western Dallas County at 37°33′33″N 93°09′43″W and the confluence with the Pomme de Terre is in Polk County at 37°38′58″N 93°21′01″W.

The stream source is an intermittent stream that arises just northwest of Foose and U.S. Route 65 in Dallas County. Just over one mile to the west it enters Polk County and turns to the north near Schofield. The stream crosses under Missouri Route 32 just east of Halfway and turns west to join the Pomme de Terre northeast of Bolivar.

It is unknown why the name "Hominy" was applied to this creek.

== See also ==
- List of rivers of Missouri
