= Campbell Township, Polk County, Missouri =

Township in Polk County, Missouri, U.S.

Coordinates: 37.7078°N 93.5617°W

Campbell Township is an inactive township in Polk County, in the U.S. state of Missouri.

Campbell Township was erected in 1885, taking its name from Glaves Campbell, a local war veteran.
