= Pickerel Creek =

Stream in the US state of Missouri

Pickerel Creek is a stream in Christian and Greene counties in the Ozarks of southwest Missouri. The stream is a tributary to the Sac River.

The headwaters of the stream are in western Christian County at 37°04′20″N 93°34′04″W and the confluence with the Sac River in Greene County is at 37°13′41″N 93°33′05″W. The stream source area lies just north of Billings and U.S. Route 60. The stream flows north into Greene County passing under Missouri Route 174 west of Republic. It continues north passing under Interstate 44 and Missouri Route 266 east of Plano and joins the Sac River about two miles north of Plano and three miles southwest of Bois D'Arc.

Pickerel Creek has the name of the local Pickerel family.

== See also ==
- List of rivers of Missouri
