= Lumley Branch =

Stream in Dade County, Missouri, U.S.

Lumley Branch is a stream in Dade County in the U.S. state of Missouri. It is a tributary of the Sac River.

The stream headwaters arise just north of U.S. Route 160 east of Everton at 37°20′35″N 93°40′12″W and it flows north approximately five miles to join the Sac River northwest of the community of Comet at 37°24′53″N 93°39′19″W.

Lumley Branch most likely was named after William Lumley, an early settler.

== See also ==
- List of rivers of Missouri
