= Barren Fork =

Barren Fork may refer to:

- Barren Fork (Boeuf Creek tributary), a stream in Missouri
- Barren Fork (Brushy Fork tributary), a stream in Missouri
- Barren Fork (Eleven Point River tributary), a stream in Missouri
- Barren Fork (Little North Fork White River tributary), a stream in Missouri
- Barren Fork (Collins River), a stream in Tennessee
