= Comet, Missouri =

Unincorporated community in Missouri, U.S.

Coordinates: 37°23′50″N 93°37′57″W

Comet is an unincorporated community in southeast Dade County, in the U.S. state of Missouri. The community lies on the banks of the Sac River, approximately six miles north-northwest of Ash Grove.

== History ==
A post office called Comet was established in 1896, and remained in operation until 1907. The name Comet most likely is a transfer from the Eastern United States.
