= Goodnight, Missouri =

- Extinct hamlet
- Location of Goodnight, Missouri
- Coordinates: 37°27′06″N 93°13′52″W
- Country: United States
- State: Missouri
- County: Polk
- Incorporated: February 24, 2003
- Disincorporated: December 12, 2016

Area
  - Total: 0.72 sq mi (1.86 km^{2})
  - Land: 0.70 sq mi (1.81 km^{2})
  - Water: 0.019 sq mi (0.05 km^{2})
- Elevation: 1,099 ft (335 m)

Population (2010)
  - Total: 18
  - Estimate (2016): 18
  - Density: 26/sq mi (9.9/km^{2})
- Time zone: UTC-6 (Central (CST))
  - Summer (DST): UTC-5 (CDT)
- ZIP code: 65725
- Area code: 417
- FIPS code: 29-27900
- GNIS feature ID: 2398177

Goodnight was a village in southern Polk County, Missouri, United States. Located on Route 215, the community is part of the Springfield, Missouri Metropolitan Statistical Area. The population was 18 at the 2010 census.

== History ==
A post office called Goodnight was established in 1883, and remained in operation until 1906. The community has the name of J. H. Goodnight, the proprietor of a local mill. The village incorporated in 2003. The village was disincorporated, effective December 12, 2016.

== Geography ==
According to the United States Census Bureau, the village had a total area of 0.72 square miles (1.86 km^{2}), of which 0.70 square miles (1.81 km^{2}) is land and 0.02 square miles (0.05 km^{2}) is water.

== Demographics ==
Historical population
Census	Pop.	Note	%±
2010	18		—
2019 (est.)	18		0.0%
U.S. Decennial Census

=== 2010 census ===
As of the census of 2010, there were 18 people, 8 households, and 5 families residing in the village. The population density was 25.8 inhabitants per square mile (10.0/km^{2}). There were 11 housing units at an average density of 15.8 per square mile (6.1/km^{2}). The racial makeup of the village was 100.0% White.

There were 8 households, of which 37.5% had children under the age of 18 living with them, 50.0% were married couples living together, 12.5% had a female householder with no husband present, and 37.5% were non-families. 37.5% of all households were made up of individuals, and 12.5% had someone living alone who was 65 years of age or older. The average household size was 2.25 and the average family size was 2.80.

The median age in the village was 40.5 years. 27.8% of residents were under the age of 18; 0.0% were between the ages of 18 and 24; 27.8% were from 25 to 44; 33.3% were from 45 to 64; and 11.1% were 65 years of age or older. The gender makeup of the village was 61.1% male and 38.9% female.
