= Graydon Springs, Missouri =

Unincorporated community in Missouri, U.S.

Coordinates: 37°27′24″N 93°30′36″W

Graydon Springs is an unincorporated community in Polk County, in the U.S. state of Missouri.

== History ==
There was a mineral springs resort first opened to the public in the 1870s as healing resort, Graydon Springs was a destination for weary travelers on the Frisco Railroad. The healing mineral springs provided the restoratives these Victorians needed. A post office called Graydon Springs was established in 1890, and remained in operation until 1940. In the photo from a Facebook Posting, the Graydon Springs Depot to the left. Main Street and rail right behind them (not visible because they had made a street out of the right of way) with the post office above the man seated. Like so many towns along the rail its all gone now as it came and went with the rail leaving a few walls and foundations.

A post office called Graydon Springs was established in 1890, and remained in operation until 1940. The community has the name of one Mr. Graydon, a railroad employee.
