= Missouri Route 215 =

State highway in Missouri, U.S.

Route 215
- MO 215 highlighted in red

Route information
- Maintained by MoDOT
- Length: 49.709 mi (79.999 km)
- Existed: October 1970–present

Major junctions
- South end: US 65 / Route O south of Buffalo
- Route 13 in Brighton
- North end: Route 39 south of Stockton

Location
- Country: United States
- State: Missouri

Highway system
- Missouri State Highway System; Interstate; US; State; Supplemental
← Route 213	→ Route 224

Route 215 is a highway in southern Missouri. Its northern terminus is at Route 39 south of Stockton; its southern terminus is at U.S. Route 65 between Buffalo and Springfield. Except for a short section which overlaps Route 13, it is a two-lane highway its entire length. It was originally a set of supplemental routes before 1970. The highway runs more east–west than north–south, but is marked as a north–south highway.

== Route description ==
The highway begins three miles (4.8 km) southwest of Stockton near Stockton Lake. Two miles west (at Umber View Heights), the highway crosses Stockton Lake and enters Stockton State Park. Shortly before reaching Bona, it crosses another arm of Stockton Lake, and at Bona is an intersection with Route 245. East of Bona, it crosses yet another arm of Stockton Lake, then begins a six-mile (9.7 km) concurrency with Route 123. At Eudora, the concurrency ends.

Seventeen miles (27 km) east of Eudora, the highway joins Route 13 for one mile (1.6 km), then turns east going through Pleasant Hope, Goodnight, and Tin Town. The highway continues east to County Road 65 (former 65) follows it then goes east where Route 215 concludes at US 65 at a Michigan left style junction where the highway continues as Route O.

== History ==
Route 215 was established in 1970, before then, it was supplemental routes.

== Major intersections ==
County	Location	mi	km	Destinations	Notes
Dallas	Sheridan Township	0.000	0.000	US 65 / Route O – Olive, Fair Grove, Buffalo	Restricted crossing U-turn intersection, all traffic must turn right
Polk	Brighton	12.542	20.184	Route 13 south – Springfield	Southern end of Route 13 overlap
Polk	East Looney Township	13.439	21.628	Route 13 north / Route 215 Spur to Route F – Bolivar	Northern end of Route 13 overlap
Polk	Eudora	24.304	39.113	Route 123 south / Route W – Walnut Grove, Dadeville	Southern end of Route 123 overlap
Polk	Union Township	28.677	46.151	Route 123 north – Aldrich	Northern end of Route 123 overlap
Dade	Bona	34.810	56.021	Route 245 to Route 32 – Dadeville	
Cedar	Stockton	49.709	79.999	Route 39 – Stockton, Arcola	
1.000 mi = 1.609 km; 1.000 km = 0.621 mi

== Related route ==
Route 215 Spur
- Location: Near Brighton
- Length: 0.332 mi (534 m)

Route 215 Spur is a former alignment of Route 215 in Polk County, Missouri. The highway begins at Route 13 and Route 215 near Brighton and runs for one-third mile (540 m) before ending at Route F (formerly Route 13) one mile (1.6 km) north of Brighton.
