= Burns, Missouri =

Unincorporated community in Polk County, Missouri

Coordinates: 37°36′17″N 93°18′33″W

Burns is an unincorporated community in Polk County, Missouri. It is located east of the Pomme de Terre River at the junction of Missouri Route 32 and Missouri Route AA between Bolivar and Buffalo.

== History ==
Burns is named after Thomas J. Burnes, an early settler. A post office operated in the community from 1884 to 1920.
