= Violet, Missouri =

Unincorporated community in Missouri

Coordinates: 37°40′03″N 93°19′11″W

Violet is an unincorporated community in eastern Polk County, Missouri.

The community is on Missouri Route AA, about six miles northeast of Bolivar.

== History ==
A post office called Violet was established in 1896 and remained in operation until 1922. The community has the name of a woman named Violet.
