= Barren Fork (Boeuf Creek tributary) =

Stream in Missouri, U.S.

Barren Fork is a stream in Franklin and Gasconade counties in the U.S. state of Missouri. It is a tributary of Boeuf Creek.

The stream headwaters arise in Gasconade County just east of Drake and Missouri Route 50 at 38°27′31″N 91°26′26″W and its confluence with Beouf Creek in western Franklin County is just northeast of Beemont at 38°29′43″N 91°20′16″W at an elevation of 591 feet (180 m).

Barren Fork was named for the poor soil along its course.

== See also ==
- List of rivers of Missouri
