= John R. Harter =

American politician and investor (1857–1931)

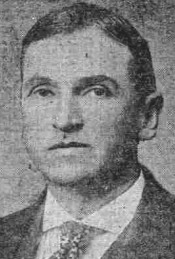

Mayor of Tillamook, Oregon
- In office 1911–1913
- Preceded by: Thomas Coates
- Succeeded by: Charles L. Clough

Personal details
- Born: May 1857 Indiana
- Died: 1931
- Resting place: San Diego, California
- Party: Democratic
- Profession: real estate investor and developer

John R. Harter (1857–1931) was an American politician and real estate investor who served as Mayor of Tillamook, Oregon for two terms, from 1911 to 1913. He resigned his office in July 1913 before information was released in an Oregon Circuit Court case alleging Harter took a payoff to ensure a public works contract.

== Biography ==
Born in Indiana in May 1857, Harter was first employed as a farm hand. Following his move to Tillamook County, Oregon, Harter found work as a lumberman. Harter became a real estate investor and developer in Tillamook County.

In 1900, Harter was nominated by the Democratic Party for the position of Tillamook County Assessor.

During the Tillamook caucus on November 25, 1911 Harter was nominated as a candidate for mayor. R. W. Watson was chosen as his opponent.

The Oregonian asked Harter's opinion on the 1912 United States presidential election in Tillamook County to which he was quoted as saying, "As a matter of fact, everyone appears to be too busy to devote time talking politics. It is a fact, though, that Tillamook County is largely Republican, and the voters are practically unanimous for the re-election of President [William Howard] Taft."

On May 21, 1912, Harter addressed a group of Portland businessmen who chartered a railcar for a trade excursion through Tillamook County.

While not explicitly in favor of saloons, Harter was the de facto "wet" candidate during the 1912 Tillamook mayoral election since his opponent, Hosea T. Botts, took a hardline pro-temperance stance. It was the first election that the women's suffrage law in Oregon had take effect and as a result half of the ballots in the 1912 Tillamook elections were cast by women.

During a city council meeting in January 1913, Harter praised a law that banned minor boys from smoking in Tillamook, but wanted stronger penalties to allow law enforcement to make arrests. He also suggested moving Tillamook's curfew law up an hour "thereby lessening the opportunities for crime and carousel, detrimental to the peace and dignity of Tillamook, and much to the annoyance of our police force." Harter also proposed creating a special police force composed of H. T. Goyne, attorney; Rev. H. W. Kullman, pastor at the Methodist Episcopal Church; Bernice Dick; and Retta Phillips.

Before the case went before the circuit court, Harter resigned as mayor stating that he had neglected his personal affairs. His full statement which he read at the city council meeting on June 21 was as follows, "To the Honorable Common Council of Tillamook, Oregon. I hereby tender my resignation as Mayor of Tillamook, Oregon, said resignation to take place on or before July 1, 1913. I have a living to make and as long as I have the affairs of the city on my hands, I can do nothing else. I have spent almost a year and a half looking after the business of the city, to the neglect of my private affairs, and I feel at this time that I am not asking too much of you to allow me to shift the burden, and judging the future by the past I think you will have little trouble in getting someone else to stand under. Thanking you one and all together with the various other city officers, for the many kind courtesies I have received at your hands, and wishing you Godspeed, I am very truly yours, John Harter, Mayor." Harter dismissed the town marshall and street commissioner before resigning his office. Charles L. Clough was appointed by the council to fill the vacancy left by Harter.

The Tillamook Herald said Harter's actions as mayor that came to light in a trial against a contractor for faulty sewer construction work showed "apparent disloyalty to the people of Tillamook". In the case, City of Tillamook v. Warren Construction Company, which was heard in the circuit court in 1913, Tillamook's engineer Richardson testified that an employee for Warren Construction Company told him that a payment of $3,500 (equivalent to $114,015 in 2025) was made or being made to Harter to secure the project. Harter denounced the testimony as false and called for an "unbiased" report on the sewer contract, which the city council agreed to take up.

According to the 1920 United States census, Harter was living with his family in San Diego, California working as a farmer.
