= Goodson, Missouri =

Unincorporated community in Polk County, Missouri, United States

- Unincorporated community
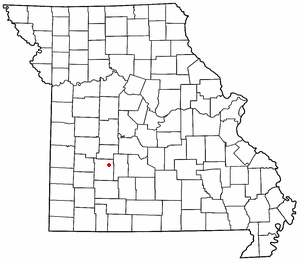
- Seal
- Interactive map of Goodson, Missouri
- Coordinates: 37°42′07″N 93°15′06″W
- Country: United States
- State: Missouri
- County: Polk

Area
  - Water: 0 sq mi (0 km^{2})

Population (2010)
  - Total: 57
- Time zone: UTC-6 (Central (CST))
  - Summer (DST): UTC-5 (CDT)
- Zip code: 65663
- Area code: 417

Goodson is an unincorporated community in Polk County, Missouri, United States.

== Description ==
The community is located at the intersection of Missouri Supplemental Routes C and P and is approximately 16 miles (26 km) northeast of Bolivar. Goodson is part of the Springfield, Missouri Metropolitan Statistical Area.

Goodson was laid out circa 1870, and named after Sam Goodson, an early citizen. A post office called Goodson was in operation from 1874 until 1991.
