= Crane Creek (Pomme de Terre River tributary) =

Stream in Hickory County, Missouri, U.S.

Coordinates: 37.9339218°N 93.3149203°W

Crane Creek is a stream in Hickory County in the U.S. state of Missouri. It is a tributary of the Pomme de Terre River.

Crane Creek enters the Pomme de Terre just south of Hermitage.

Some say the name is derived from one Taylor Crane, an early settler, while others believe cranes in the area account for the name.

== See also ==
- List of rivers of Missouri
