= Morrisville, Missouri =

- City
- Location of Morrisville, Missouri
- Coordinates: 37°28′36″N 93°25′45″W
- Country: United States
- State: Missouri
- County: Polk
- Incorporated: 1906

Area
  - Total: 0.64 sq mi (1.66 km^{2})
  - Land: 0.64 sq mi (1.66 km^{2})
  - Water: 0.0039 sq mi (0.01 km^{2})
- Elevation: 1,135 ft (346 m)

Population (2020)
  - Total: 376
  - Density: 587.0/sq mi (226.63/km^{2})
- Time zone: UTC-6 (Central (CST))
  - Summer (DST): UTC-5 (CDT)
- ZIP codes: 65645, 65710
- Area code: 417
- FIPS code: 29-50078
- GNIS feature ID: 2396784

Morrisville is a city in southern Polk County, Missouri, United States. The population was 388 at the 2010 census. It is part of the Springfield, Missouri Metropolitan Statistical Area.

== History ==
Morrisville was founded in 1870 by Morris Mitchell, and named after him. A post office called Morrisville has been in operation since 1872.

== Geography ==
Morrisville is located on Missouri Route 215 approximately 5.5 miles east of Eudora and 4.5 miles west of Brighton. The Little Sac River flows past about two miles to the southeast.

According to the United States Census Bureau, the city has a total area of 0.64 square miles (1.66 km^{2}), all land.

== Demographics ==
Historical population
Census	Pop.	Note	%±
1880	122		—
1910	360		—
1920	425		18.1%
1930	340		−20.0%
1940	329		−3.2%
1950	296		−10.0%
1960	228		−23.0%
1970	256		12.3%
1980	331		29.3%
1990	293		−11.5%
2000	344		17.4%
2010	388		12.8%
2020	376		−3.1%
U.S. Decennial Census

=== 2010 census ===
As of the census of 2010, there were 388 people, 153 households, and 110 families living in the city. The population density was 606.3 inhabitants per square mile (234.1/km^{2}). There were 166 housing units at an average density of 259.4 per square mile (100.2/km^{2}). The racial makeup of the city was 94.3% White, 1.0% African American, 0.8% Native American, 0.3% from other races, and 3.6% from two or more races. Hispanic or Latino of any race were 1.8% of the population.

There were 153 households, of which 34.0% had children under the age of 18 living with them, 55.6% were married couples living together, 9.2% had a female householder with no husband present, 7.2% had a male householder with no wife present, and 28.1% were non-families. 23.5% of all households were made up of individuals, and 8.5% had someone living alone who was 65 years of age or older. The average household size was 2.54 and the average family size was 2.97.

The median age in the city was 37.6 years. 24.7% of residents were under the age of 18; 10.1% were between the ages of 18 and 24; 24.1% were from 25 to 44; 27% were from 45 to 64; and 14.2% were 65 years of age or older. The gender makeup of the city was 50.3% male and 49.7% female.

=== 2000 census ===
As of the census of 2000, there were 344 people, 130 households, and 89 families living in the town. The population density was 1,125.5 inhabitants per square mile (434.6/km^{2}). There were 137 housing units at an average density of 448.2 per square mile (173.1/km^{2}). The racial makeup of the town was 98.84% White, 0.29% Native American, and 0.87% from two or more races. Hispanic or Latino of any race were 2.03% of the population.

There were 130 households, out of which 36.9% had children under the age of 18 living with them, 53.1% were married couples living together, 12.3% had a female householder with no husband present, and 30.8% were non-families. 27.7% of all households were made up of individuals, and 16.9% had someone living alone who was 65 years of age or older. The average household size was 2.65 and the average family size was 3.22.

In the town the population was spread out, with 29.9% under the age of 18, 8.1% from 18 to 24, 29.4% from 25 to 44, 17.2% from 45 to 64, and 15.4% who were 65 years of age or older. The median age was 36 years. For every 100 females, there were 96.6 males. For every 100 females age 18 and over, there were 89.8 males.

The median income for a household in the town was $23,906, and the median income for a family was $30,357. Males had a median income of $22,813 versus $20,556 for females. The per capita income for the town was $11,440. About 16.3% of families and 27.9% of the population were below the poverty line, including 27.0% of those under age 18 and 37.1% of those age 65 or over.

== Education ==
Marion C. Early R-V School District operates one elementary school, one junior high school, and Marion C. Early High School at Morrisville.

Morrisville has a public library, a branch of the Polk County Library.

== Notable person ==
Country singer Wynn Stewart was born in Morrisville.
