= Bona, Missouri =

Unincorporated community in Dade County, Missouri, United States

Coordinates: 37°32′41″N 93°40′18″W

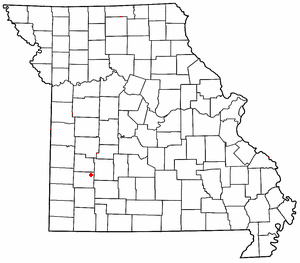

Bona is an unincorporated community in northeastern Dade County, Missouri, United States. It is located at the intersection of Routes 215 and 245, approximately fourteen miles northeast of Greenfield. It is situated near Stockton Lake.

A post office called Bona was established in 1892, and remained in operation until 1911. The community was named by postal officials.

Today, the community is home to the Bona Church of Christ and a cemetery, as well as a few residences. The Bona school was located about a mile north of the main body of the community. (Missouri Annual Reports of Public Schools, 1932, page 391) It once featured a two-year "Job" high school, but was consolidated with the Dadeville C-2 School District in the 1950s to form the current Dadeville R-II School District.

The most common local pronunciation of "Bona" sounds like "Bonnie," although in recent years there has also been a trend toward a pronunciation sounding like "Bonna."
