= Wishart, Missouri =

Unincorporated community in Missouri, U.S.

Coordinates: 37°30′32″N 93°27′35″W

Wishart is an unincorporated community in Polk County, in the U.S. state of Missouri.

The community is on a county road approximately 2.5 miles northwest of Morrisville. Slagle Creek flows past just south of the community and meets the Little Sac River about two miles to the west.

== History ==
A post office called Wishart was established in 1884, and remained in operation until 1957. The community has the name of one D.R. Wishart, a railroad official.
