= Mooney Township, Polk County, Missouri =

Township in Polk County, Missouri, U.S.

Coordinates: 37.4833°N 93.2469°W

Mooney Township is an inactive township in Polk County, in the U.S. state of Missouri.

Mooney Township has the name of John Mooney, a pioneer settler.
