= Huckaby, Missouri =

Unincorporated community in Missouri, U.S.

Coordinates: 37°47′22″N 93°15′00″W

Huckaby is an unincorporated community in Polk County, in the U.S. state of Missouri.

== History ==
A post office called Huckaby was established in 1905, and remained in operation until 1915. The community has the name of the local Huckaby family.
