= Rock Prairie, Missouri =

Unincorporated community in Missouri, U.S.

Coordinates: 37°28′59″N 93°12′10″W

Rock Prairie is an unincorporated community in Polk County, in the U.S. state of Missouri.

== History ==
The community once contained Rock Prairie School, now defunct. The school was so named on account of the topography of the site.
