= Cliquot, Missouri =

Unincorporated community in Missouri, U.S.

Coordinates: 37°41′38″N 93°28′40″W

Cliquot is an unincorporated community in western Polk County, in the U.S. state of Missouri. The community is located on Route O, east of Missouri Route 13, and six miles northwest of Bolivar. The site is on an abandoned railroad line on Dry Fork, the former "Highline" of the St. Louis-San Francisco Railway.

== History ==
A post office called Cliquot was established in 1893, and remained in operation until 1957. The community was named after the horse of a local landowner.
