= Johnson Township, Polk County, Missouri =

Inactive township in the US state of Missouri

Coordinates: 37.7789°N 93.5872°W

Johnson Township is an inactive township in Polk County, in the U.S. state of Missouri.

Johnson Township has the name of Vice President Richard Mentor Johnson.
