= Sentinel, Missouri =

Unincorporated community in Missouri, U.S.

Coordinates: 37°47′37″N 93°17′45″W

Sentinel is an unincorporated community in northern Polk County, in the U.S. state of Missouri.

The site is located just east of Missouri Route 64 between Mohawk Corner to the south and Pittsburg in Hickory County to the north. Pomme de Terre Lake lies to the west and north of the community.

== History ==
A post office called Sentinel was established in 1899, and remained in operation until 1955. The community most likely was so named on account of the site being a landmark (or sentinel) in the area.
