= Van, Missouri =

Unincorporated community in Missouri, U.S.

Coordinates: 37°33′41″N 93°17′14″W

Van is an unincorporated community in Polk County, in the U.S. state of Missouri. The community is approximately seven miles southeast of Bolivar and on Missouri Route YY. Deer Creek flows past the east side of the community.

== History ==
A post office called Van was established in 1899, and remained in operation until 1934. The community has the name of Van Burnes, the son of the original owner of the site.
