= West Bend, Missouri =

Unincorporated community in Missouri, U.S.

Coordinates: 37°27′27″N 93°27′40″W

West Bend is an unincorporated community in southwestern Polk County, in the U.S. state of Missouri.

== History ==
A post office called West Bend was established in 1853, and remained in operation until 1865. The community was named for a nearby meander of the Little Sac River.
