= Slagle Creek (Brush Creek tributary) =

Stream in the American state of Missouri

Coordinates: 37.066163°N 90.110656°W

Slagle Creek is a stream in Bollinger and Wayne Counties in the U.S. state of Missouri. It is a tributary of Brush Creek.

Slagle Creek has the name of J. A. Slagle, an early settler.

== See also ==
- List of rivers of Missouri
