= Slagle Creek (Applegate River tributary) =

Stream in the U.S. state of Oregon that is a tributary to the Applegate River

Coordinates: 42°18′31″N 123°14′29″W

Slagle Creek is a stream in the U.S. state of Oregon. It is a tributary to the Applegate River.

Slagle Creek was named in 1858 after one Conrad Slagle.
