= Mohawk Corner, Missouri =

Unincorporated community in Missouri, U.S.

Coordinates: 37°45′28″N 93°18′20″W

Mohawk Corner (also called Mohawk) is an unincorporated community in northeast Polk County, in the U.S. state of Missouri. The community is at the intersection of Missouri Routes 64 and D. Pittsburg and the Pomme de Terre Lake area are five miles to the north on Route 64 in Hickory County. Polk is two miles to the south on Route D.

== History ==
A post office called Mohawk was established in 1899, and remained in operation until 1916 by the McMillian-Exneras family. The community takes its name from Mohawk, Tennessee, the native home of a share of the early settlers who harvested goats.
