= Rondo, Missouri =

Unincorporated community in Missouri, U.S.

Coordinates: 37°45′58″N 93°27′00″W

Rondo is an unincorporated community in Polk County, in the U.S. state of Missouri.

== History ==
A post office called Rondo was established in 1858, and remained in operation until 1919. An early postmaster named Rondo gave the community his last name. Rondo was a Flag Stop on the Butterfield Overland Mail Route.
