= Barren Creek, West Virginia =

Unincorporated community in West Virginia, United States

- Unincorporated community
- Location in West Virginia and the United States Barren Creek (the United States)
- Coordinates: 38°29′19″N 81°16′32″W
- Country: United States
- State: West Virginia
- County: Kanawha
- Elevation: 620 ft (190 m)
- Time zone: UTC-5 (Eastern (EST))
  - Summer (DST): UTC-4 (EDT)
- GNIS ID: 1535278

Barren Creek is an unincorporated community in Kanawha County, West Virginia, United States.
