= Huron, Missouri =

Unincorporated community in Missouri, US

Coordinates: 37°42′57″N 93°21′12″W

Huron is an unincorporated community in Polk County, in the U.S. state of Missouri.

== History ==
A post office called Huron was established in 1897, and remained in operation until 1918. The community was named after Huron, Tennessee, the native home of a share of the early settlers.
