= Union Township, Polk County, Missouri =

Inactive township in the US state of Missouri

Union Township
- Inactive township
- Location in Missouri, United States
- Coordinates: 37.5475°N 93.5608°W
- Country: United States
- State: Missouri
- County: Polk
- Formed: by merger of two townships
- Time zone: UTC−6 (CST)

Union Township is an inactive township in Polk County, in the U.S. state of Missouri.

Union Township was formed by merger (or "union") of two other townships, hence the name.
