= Beemont, Missouri =

Unincorporated community in Missouri, U.S.

Coordinates: 38°28′50″N 91°21′34″W

Beemont is an unincorporated community in western Franklin County, in the U.S. state of Missouri. The community is located on Missouri Route ZZ on the west side of Boeuf Creek one half mile east of the Franklin-Gasconade county line.

== History ==
A post office called Beemont was established in 1878, and remained in operation until 1915. The community was so named in jest because its few businesses were said to be as "busy as a bee".
