= Brighton, Missouri =

Unincorporated community in Missouri, U.S.

Coordinates: 37°27′28″N 93°20′53″W

Brighton is an unincorporated community in southern Polk County, Missouri, United States. It is located at the intersection of Missouri Routes 13 and 215. James H.M. Smith Relay Station was just north of Brighton on the Butterfield Overland Mail Route.

Bolivar is eleven miles to the north and Springfield is approximately fifteen miles south.

Brighton is part of the Springfield Metropolitan Statistical Area. The ZIP Code for Brighton is 65617.

A post office called Brighton has been in operation since 1852. The community takes its name from Brighton, Tennessee, the native home of a large share of the first settlers.
