= Flemington, Missouri =

- Village
- Location of Flemington, Missouri
- Coordinates: 37°48′14″N 93°30′05″W
- Country: United States
- State: Missouri
- County: Polk

Area
  - Total: 0.33 sq mi (0.86 km^{2})
  - Land: 0.33 sq mi (0.86 km^{2})
  - Water: 0 sq mi (0.00 km^{2})
- Elevation: 1,132 ft (345 m)

Population (2020)
  - Total: 110
  - Density: 332/sq mi (128.3/km^{2})
- Time zone: UTC-6 (Central (CST))
  - Summer (DST): UTC-5 (CDT)
- ZIP code: 65650
- Area code: 417
- FIPS code: 29-24580
- GNIS feature ID: 2398884

Flemington is a village in Polk County, Missouri, United States. As of the 2020 census, Flemington had a population of 110. It is part of the Springfield, Missouri Metropolitan Statistical Area.

== History ==
Flemington had its start in 1898 when the railroad was extended to that point. The community has the name of Robert Fleming, a first settler. A post office called Flemington has been in operation since 1898.

== Geography ==
According to the United States Census Bureau, the village has a total area of 0.33 square miles (0.85 km^{2}), all land.

== Demographics ==
Historical population
Census	Pop.	Note	%±
1950	181		—
1960	142		−21.5%
1970	126		−11.3%
1980	140		11.1%
1990	141		0.7%
2000	124		−12.1%
2010	148		19.4%
2020	110		−25.7%
U.S. Decennial Census

=== 2010 census ===
As of the census of 2010, there were 148 people, 59 households, and 35 families living in the village. The population density was 448.5 inhabitants per square mile (173.2/km^{2}). There were 73 housing units at an average density of 221.2 per square mile (85.4/km^{2}). The racial makeup of the village was 97.3% White, 1.4% Native American, and 1.4% from two or more races. Hispanic or Latino of any race were 4.7% of the population.

There were 59 households, of which 23.7% had children under the age of 18 living with them, 40.7% were married couples living together, 15.3% had a female householder with no husband present, 3.4% had a male householder with no wife present, and 40.7% were non-families. 33.9% of all households were made up of individuals, and 18.7% had someone living alone who was 65 years of age or older. The average household size was 2.51 and the average family size was 3.31.

The median age in the village was 45.5 years. 23% of residents were under the age of 18; 4.1% were between the ages of 18 and 24; 20.9% were from 25 to 44; 35.9% were from 45 to 64; and 16.2% were 65 years of age or older. The gender makeup of the village was 45.9% male and 54.1% female.

=== 2000 census ===
As of the census of 2000, there were 124 people, 54 households, and 32 families living in the village. The population density was 379.8 inhabitants per square mile (146.6/km^{2}). There were 76 housing units at an average density of 232.8 per square mile (89.9/km^{2}). The racial makeup of the village was 96.77% White, 1.61% Native American, and 1.61% from two or more races. Hispanic or Latino of any race were 0.81% of the population.

There were 54 households, out of which 33.3% had children under the age of 18 living with them, 46.3% were married couples living together, 9.3% had a female householder with no husband present, and 38.9% were non-families. 33.3% of all households were made up of individuals, and 13.0% had someone living alone who was 65 years of age or older. The average household size was 2.30 and the average family size was 2.94.

In the village, the population was spread out, with 24.2% under the age of 18, 9.7% from 18 to 24, 26.6% from 25 to 44, 27.4% from 45 to 64, and 12.1% who were 65 years of age or older. The median age was 40 years. For every 100 females, there were 106.7 males. For every 100 females age 18 and over, there were 91.8 males.

The median income for a household in the village was $23,438, and the median income for a family was $22,500. Males had a median income of $18,438 versus $16,875 for females. The per capita income for the village was $11,499. There were 21.1% of families and 27.5% of the population living below the poverty line, including 54.8% of under eighteens and none of those over 64.
