= Polk, Missouri =

Unincorporated community in Missouri, U.S.

Coordinates: 37°43′45″N 93°17′58″W

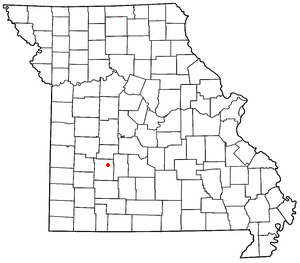

Polk is an Unincorporated community in Polk County, Missouri, United States. It is located on Missouri Supplemental Route D, approximately twelve miles northeast of Bolivar. Polk is part of the Springfield, Missouri Metropolitan Statistical Area.

A post office called Polk was established in 1880, and remained in operation until 1973. The community took its name from Polk County.
