= Missouri Route 123 =

State highway in Missouri, U.S.

Route 123
- MO 123 highlighted in red

Route information
- Maintained by MoDOT
- Length: 45.889 mi (73.851 km)

Major junctions
- South end: US 160 in Willard
- Route 32 in Fair Play; Route 13 near Humansville
- North end: US 54 in Weaubleau

Location
- Country: United States
- State: Missouri

Highway system
- Missouri State Highway System; Interstate; US; State; Supplemental
← Route 122	→ Route 124

Route 123 is a highway in southwestern Missouri. Its northern terminus is at U.S. Route 54 in Weaubleau; its southern terminus is at U.S. Route 160 in Willard.

== Route description ==
The current highway begins in Weableau. South of Humansville, it crosses Route 13 and at Fair Play it intersects Route 32. At Aldrich, the road crosses Stockton Lake, then forms a concurrency with Route 215 to Eudora. At the north edge of Willard, the road ends at US 160.

Originally, the highway continued all the way to Springfield, passing through town on various streets (one of which was West Bypass) and leaving town on Campbell Avenue. The path south of Springfield is modern US 160 and headed through Nixa, Highlandville, and Spokane. At Spokane, old Route 123 followed modern Route 176 (US 160 also followed this route until the newer highway was built) to Walnut Shade where the highway ended.

== History ==
The original termini of the highway were at Route 64 in Fair Play and Route 76 in Walnut Shade, Missouri. The road, however, would be extended further north and shortened to the south. From Willard, the highway continued on through Springfield, Nixa, Highlandville, and to Walnut Shade.

Route 13 would be moved to a new road further east (providing a shorter route between Bolivar and Springfield, and Route 123 would take over the old Route 13 path.

The southern end of the highway was truncated when U.S. Route 160 was extended from its former terminus in Springfield, and the road's terminus was moved back to Springfield (at US 160), and later still (in the 1980s) back to Willard when US 160 was rerouted.

== Major intersections ==
County	Location	mi	km	Destinations	Notes
Greene	Willard	0.000	0.000	US 160	
Greene	Walnut Grove	8.484	13.654	Route V / Route BB	
Polk	Eudora	13.485	21.702	Route 215 east / Route W	South end of Route 215 overlap
Polk		17.858	28.740	Route 215 west	North end of Route 215 overlap
Polk	Aldrich	19.647	31.619	Route T	
Polk		22.608	36.384	Route VV	
Polk	Fair Play	25.653	41.285	Route 32 east	South end of Route 32 overlap
Polk	Fair Play	26.066	41.949	Route 32 west	North end of Route 32 overlap
Polk	Fair Play	26.558	42.741	Route BB	
Polk	Dunnegan	31.113	50.072	Route A	
Polk		35.869	57.726	Route 13	
Polk	Humansville	38.696	62.275	Route V	
Hickory	Weaubleau	45.889	73.851	US 54	
1.000 mi = 1.609 km; 1.000 km = 0.621 mi: Concurrency terminus
