= Pomme de Terre River (Missouri) =

River in Missouri, United States

Pomme de Terre River Potato River
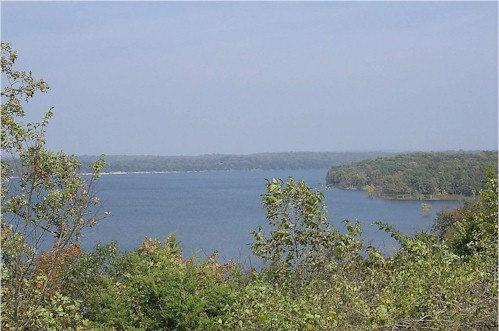

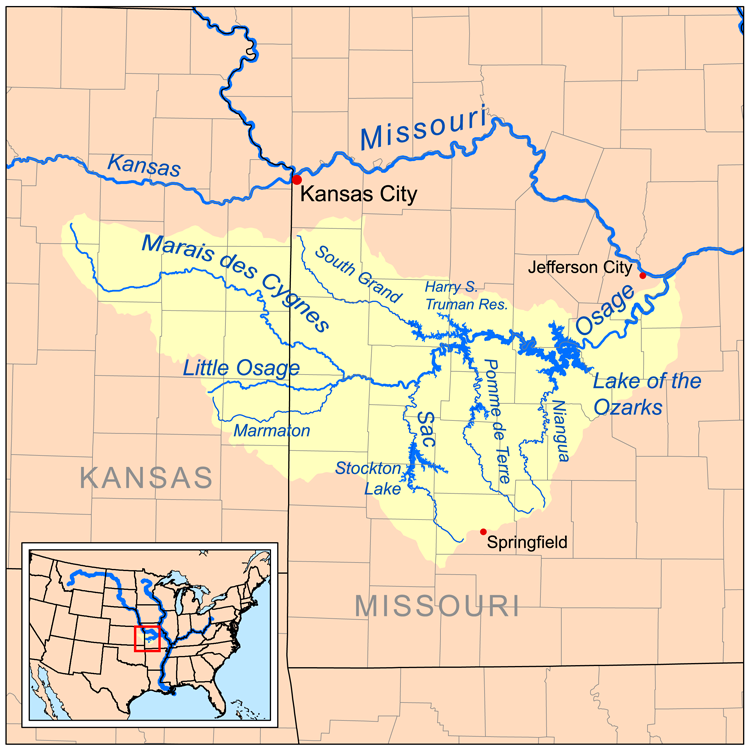
- Map of the Osage River watershed showing the Pomme de Terre River

Location
- Country: United States
- State: Missouri

Physical characteristics
- Source
  - location: Marshfield, Missouri
  - coordinates: 37°20′24″N 92°56′43″W
  - elevation: 1,454 ft (443 m)
- Mouth: Truman Reservoir
  - location: Hickory County, Missouri
  - coordinates: 38°00′35″N 93°18′59″W
  - elevation: 709 ft (216 m)
- Length: 130 mi (210 km)
- Basin size: 840 sq mi (2,200 km^{2})
- Discharge
  - location: USGS 06921350 near Hermitage, MO
  - average: 546 cu ft/s (15.5 m^{3}/s)
  - minimum: 0 cu ft/s (0 m^{3}/s)
  - maximum: 9,000 cu ft/s (250 m^{3}/s)

Basin features
- Tributaries
  - left: McKinney Branch, Piper Creek (Missouri), Dry Fork
  - right: Deer Creek, Hominy Creek, Stinking Creek, Possum Creek, Lindley Creek, Crane Creek
- Watersheds: Pomme de Terre-Osage-Missouri-Mississippi

The Pomme de Terre River (pronounced /ˌpʌm də ˈtɑːr/ PUM də TAR) is a 130-mile-long (210 km) tributary of the Osage River in southwestern Missouri in the United States. Via the Osage and Missouri rivers, it is part of the watershed of the Mississippi River.

Pomme de terre is French for potato, a food Indians harvested in the area. Before the French explorers, the Osage people, who were historically indigenous to the region, had called it a name meaning Big Bone River, referring to the fossils of mastodons and other ancient creatures which they found along its eroding banks.

== Course ==
The Pomme de Terre River is formed in Greene County in the Ozarks by the confluence of its short north and south forks, which rise in Webster and Greene counties, respectively. The river flows generally northward through Dallas, Polk, Hickory and Benton counties, past the town of Hermitage. In Polk County it collects the short Little Pomme de Terre River, which rises in Greene County and flows generally northwestwardly. In Hickory County a U.S. Army Corps of Engineers dam causes the river to form Pomme de Terre Lake. It enters the Osage River as an arm of Truman Lake, which is formed by a dam on the Osage.

== See also ==
- List of rivers of Missouri
