= Adonis, Missouri =

Unincorporated community in Missouri, U.S.

Coordinates: 37°47′47″N 93°21′48″W

Adonis is an unincorporated community in northern Polk County, in the U.S. state of Missouri.

Adonis is on the southern shore of Pomme de Terre Lake.

== History ==
A post office called Adonis was established in 1895, and remained in operation until 1935. The community has the name of Adonis, a Greek god.

In 1925, Adonis had 25 inhabitants.
