= Eudora, Missouri =

Unincorporated community in Missouri, U.S.

Coordinates: 37°28′57″N 93°32′16″W

Eudora is an unincorporated community in southwestern Polk County, Missouri, United States. It is located just east of the intersection of Route 123 and Route 215, approximately twenty miles northwest of Springfield. Aldrich on the east prong of Stockton Lake is about four miles to the north on Route 123. A post office in Eudora was open from 1900 to 1964. The Kansas City, Clinton and Springfield Railway formerly passed through the community.
