= Sac River =

River in Missouri, U.S.

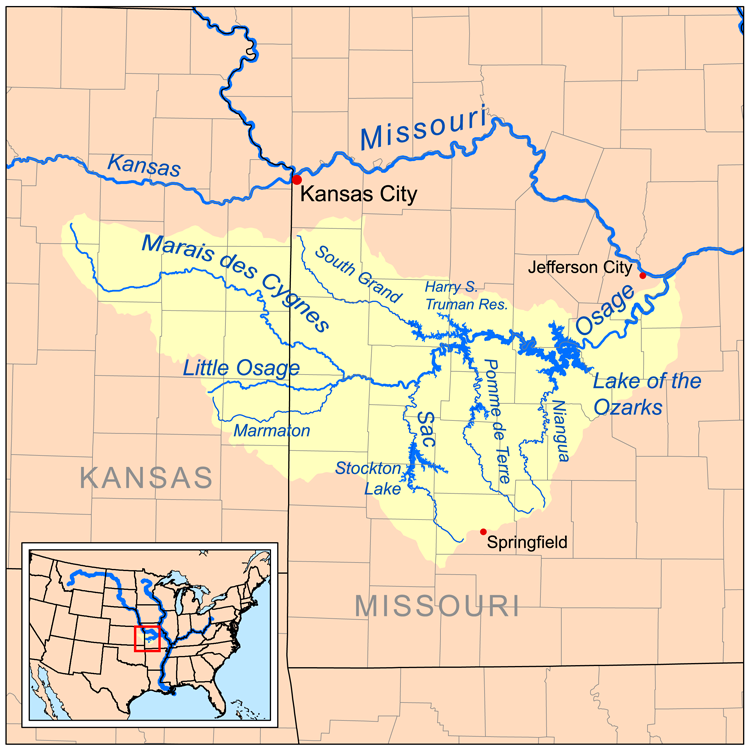
- Map of the Osage River watershed showing the Sac River

Location
- Country: United States
- State: Missouri

Physical characteristics
- Source
  - location: Greene County, Missouri
  - coordinates: 37°12′39″N 93°26′04″W
  - elevation: 1,240 ft (380 m)
- Mouth: Truman Reservoir
  - location: Osceola, Missouri
  - coordinates: 38°01′00″N 93°43′08″W
  - elevation: 709 ft (216 m)
- Length: 118 mi (190 km)
- Basin size: 1,981 sq mi (5,130 km^{2})
- Discharge
  - location: USGS 06919900 near Caplinger Mills, MO
  - average: 1,670 cu ft/s (47 m^{3}/s)
  - minimum: 34 cu ft/s (0.96 m^{3}/s)
  - maximum: 51,200 cu ft/s (1,450 m^{3}/s)

Basin features
- Tributaries
  - left: Pickerel Creek, Lumley Branch
  - right: Little Sac River
- Watersheds: Sac-Osage-Missouri-Mississippi

The Sac River (pronounced sock) is a river in the Ozarks of Southwest Missouri, United States.

== Description ==
The river is 118 miles (190 km) long, with headwaters in western Greene County. The stream passes through the northeast corner of Lawrence County then re-enters Greene County. The stream enters Dade County northwest of Ash Grove. The stream enters Stockton Lake in Dade County between Dadeville and Greenfield, then flows north exiting Stockton Lake in Cedar County. The stream meanders north into St. Clair County, passes under US Route 54 and enters the Osage River in Truman Reservoir southeast of Osceola.

Large portions of the Sac River and the Little Sac River are inundated by Stockton Lake.

The river was named after the Sac Indians. The Big Eddy Site, an archaeological dig, is along the Sac River within Cedar County. Eleven feet of river sediment at the site provides a stratigraphy that suggests more than 10,000 years of nearly constant occupation by American Indians, potentially pre-dating the Clovis culture and contributing to the knowledge of the Dalton and San Patrice cultures.

== See also ==
- List of rivers of Missouri
