= Karlin, Missouri =

Unincorporated community in Missouri, U.S.

Coordinates: 37°33′15″N 93°24′51″W

Karlin is an unincorporated community in central Polk County, in the Ozarks of southwest Missouri, United States.

Karlin is located approximately 3.5 miles south of Bolivar and 1.5 miles west of Missouri Route 13. The village is located just north of Missouri Route U and adjacent to the Burlington Northern Railroad.

== History ==
A variant name was "Tremont". A post office called Tremont was established in 1889, the name was changed to Karlin in 1903, and the post office closed in 1944. The present name is after Karlín, in the Czech Republic.

In 1991 the railroad tracks were abandoned. The section of railroad right of way that runs through Karlin is now used as part of the 37.6 mile Frisco Highline Trail that runs from Springfield to Bolivar, Missouri.
