= Slagle, Missouri =

Unincorporated community in Missouri, U.S.

Coordinates: 37°31′56″N 93°22′31″W

Slagle is an unincorporated community in Polk County, in the U.S. state of Missouri.

== History ==
A post office called Slagle was established in 1874, and remained in operation until 1905. The community is named after the local Slagle family.
