= Fair Play, Missouri =

- City
- Location of Fair Play, Missouri
- Coordinates: 37°37′59″N 93°34′37″W
- Country: United States
- State: Missouri
- County: Polk

Area
  - Total: 0.41 sq mi (1.07 km^{2})
  - Land: 0.41 sq mi (1.06 km^{2})
  - Water: 0.0039 sq mi (0.01 km^{2})
- Elevation: 1,017 ft (310 m)

Population (2020)
  - Total: 422
  - Density: 1,027/sq mi (396.6/km^{2})
- Time zone: UTC-6 (Central (CST))
  - Summer (DST): UTC-5 (CDT)
- ZIP code: 65649
- Area code: 417
- FIPS code: 29-23428
- GNIS feature ID: 2394724
- Website: www.fairplaymo.com

Fair Play is a city in western Polk County, Missouri, United States. As of the 2020 census, Fair Play had a population of 422. It is part of the Springfield, Missouri Metropolitan Statistical Area.

== History ==
The first post office in Fair Play was established in 1852. The founder wished to call it Oakland, but because that name was already assigned to another community, he declared "We'll just call it Fair Play".

== Geography ==
Fair Play is located at the intersection of Missouri routes 32 and 123. Bolivar is 6.5 miles to the east and Stockton on Stockton Lake is twelve miles to the west-northwest.

According to the United States Census Bureau, the city has a total area of 0.41 square miles (1.06 km^{2}), all land.

== Demographics ==
Historical population
Census	Pop.	Note	%±
1900	407		—
1910	421		3.4%
1920	486		15.4%
1930	454		−6.6%
1940	431		−5.1%
1950	383		−11.1%
1960	335		−12.5%
1970	328		−2.1%
1980	384		17.1%
1990	442		15.1%
2000	418		−5.4%
2010	475		13.6%
2020	422		−11.2%
U.S. Decennial Census

=== 2010 census ===
As of the census of 2010, there were 475 people, 200 households, and 116 families living in the city. The population density was 1,158.5 inhabitants per square mile (447.3/km^{2}). There were 225 housing units at an average density of 548.8 per square mile (211.9/km^{2}). The racial makeup of the city was 96.8% White, 0.6% Native American, 0.2% Asian, 0.6% from other races, and 1.7% from two or more races. Hispanic or Latino of any race were 1.9% of the population.

There were 200 households, of which 32.5% had children under the age of 18 living with them, 42.5% were married couples living together, 7.5% had a female householder with no husband present, 8.0% had a male householder with no wife present, and 42.0% were non-families. 35.5% of all households were made up of individuals, and 17% had someone living alone who was 65 years of age or older. The average household size was 2.38 and the average family size was 3.08.

The median age in the city was 38.1 years. 27.2% of residents were under the age of 18; 8.4% were between the ages of 18 and 24; 21.9% were from 25 to 44; 27.2% were from 45 to 64; and 15.4% were 65 years of age or older. The gender makeup of the city was 51.4% male and 48.6% female.

=== 2000 census ===
As of the census of 2000, there were 418 people, 160 households, and 107 families living in the city. The population density was 1,392.5 inhabitants per square mile (537.6/km^{2}). There were 189 housing units at an average density of 629.6 per square mile (243.1/km^{2}). The racial makeup of the city was 95.45% White, 0.48% African American, 3.11% Native American, 0.48% from other races, and 0.48% from two or more races. Hispanic or Latino of any race were 0.72% of the population.

There were 160 households, out of which 40.0% had children under the age of 18 living with them, 55.0% were married couples living together, 7.5% had a female householder with no husband present, and 33.1% were non-families. 30.0% of all households were made up of individuals, and 17.5% had someone living alone who was 65 years of age or older. The average household size was 2.61 and the average family size was 3.21.

In the city, the population was spread out, with 34.7% under the age of 18, 6.5% from 18 to 24, 23.2% from 25 to 44, 21.3% from 45 to 64, and 14.4% who were 65 years of age or older. The median age was 34 years. For every 100 females, there were 94.4 males. For every 100 females age 18 and over, there were 92.3 males.

The median income for a household in the city was $20,438, and the median income for a family was $23,750. Males had a median income of $22,422 versus $17,500 for females. The per capita income for the city was $9,151. About 22.1% of families and 29.9% of the population were below the poverty line, including 37.3% of those under age 18 and 36.7% of those age 65 or over.

== Education ==
Fair Play R-II School District operates one elementary school and Fair Play High School.

Fair Play has a public library, a branch of the Polk County Library.
