= Dadeville, Missouri =

- Village
- Location of Dadeville, Missouri
- Coordinates: 37°28′46″N 93°40′26″W
- Country: United States
- State: Missouri
- County: Dade

Area
  - Total: 1.00 sq mi (2.58 km^{2})
  - Land: 0.99 sq mi (2.57 km^{2})
  - Water: 0.0039 sq mi (0.01 km^{2})
- Elevation: 1,089 ft (332 m)

Population (2020)
  - Total: 226
  - Density: 227.8/sq mi (87.95/km^{2})
- Time zone: UTC-6 (Central (CST))
  - Summer (DST): UTC-5 (CDT)
- ZIP code: 65635
- Area code: 417
- FIPS code: 29-17992
- GNIS feature ID: 2398667

Dadeville is a village in Dade County, Missouri, United States. The population was 226 at the 2020 census.

== History ==
There have been two Dade County towns called Dadeville: an earlier Dadeville was founded in the 1840s and went extinct after the county seat was established at Greenfield. The current site of Dadeville was first called Melville. A post office called Melville opened in 1853, and the name was changed to Dadeville in 1858. The village is named after Dade County.

== Geography ==
According to the United States Census Bureau, the village has a total area of 0.99 square miles (2.56 km^{2}), all land.

== Demographics ==
Historical population
| Census | Pop. | Note | %± |
|---|---|---|---|
| 1880 | 243 | | — |
| 1900 | 466 | | — |
| 1910 | 401 | | −13.9% |
| 1920 | 333 | | −17.0% |
| 1930 | 272 | | −18.3% |
| 1940 | 248 | | −8.8% |
| 1950 | 208 | | −16.1% |
| 1960 | 142 | | −31.7% |
| 1970 | 149 | | 4.9% |
| 1980 | 216 | | 45.0% |
| 1990 | 220 | | 1.9% |
| 2000 | 224 | | 1.8% |
| 2010 | 234 | | 4.5% |
| 2020 | 226 | | −3.4% |
U.S. Decennial Census

=== 2010 census ===
As of the census of 2010, there were 234 people, 90 households, and 69 families living in the village. The population density was 236.4 inhabitants per square mile (91.3/km^{2}). There were 104 housing units at an average density of 105.1 per square mile (40.6/km^{2}). The racial makeup of the village was 96.2% White, 0.9% Native American, 0.4% Asian, and 2.6% from two or more races. Hispanic or Latino people of any race were 2.1% of the population.

There were 90 households, of which 34.4% had children under the age of 18 living with them, 61.1% were married couples living together, 11.1% had a female householder with no husband present, 4.4% had a male householder with no wife present, and 23.3% were non-families. 18.9% of all households were made up of individuals, and 11.1% had someone living alone who was 65 years of age or older. The average household size was 2.60 and the average family size was 2.99.

The median age in the village was 44 years. 25.6% of residents were under the age of 18; 6.4% were between the ages of 18 and 24; 19.7% were from 25 to 44; 29% were from 45 to 64; and 19.2% were 65 years of age or older. The gender makeup of the village was 46.6% male and 53.4% female. Cows and other livestock make up 79% of population.

=== 2000 census ===
As of the census of 2000, there were 224 people, 93 households, and 66 families living in the village. The population density was 225.5 inhabitants per square mile (87.1/km^{2}). There were 103 housing units at an average density of 103.7 per square mile (40.0/km^{2}). The racial makeup of the village was 96.88% White, 1.34% Native American, 0.45% from other races, and 1.34% from two or more races. Hispanic or Latino people of any race were 0.89% of the population.

There were 93 households, out of which 26.9% had children under the age of 18 living with them, 64.5% were married couples living together, 4.3% had a female householder with no husband present, and 28.0% were non-families. 23.7% of all households were made up of individuals, and 12.9% had someone living alone who was 65 years of age or older. The average household size was 2.41 and the average family size was 2.82.

In the village, the population was spread out, with 21.9% under the age of 18, 10.7% from 18 to 24, 24.6% from 25 to 44, 23.2% from 45 to 64, and 19.6% who were 65 years of age or older. The median age was 39 years. For every 100 females, there were 88.2 males. For every 100 females age 18 and over, there were 84.2 males.

The median income for a household in the village was $27,000, and the median income for a family was $30,000. Males had a median income of $21,250 versus $15,000 for females. The per capita income for the village was $11,135. About 19.1% of families and 16.0% of the population were below the poverty line, including 13.4% of those under the age of eighteen and 15.9% of those 65 or over.

== Notable people ==
- Mount Etna Morris — former State Treasurer of Missouri, born and raised in Dadeville
