= Stockton Lake =

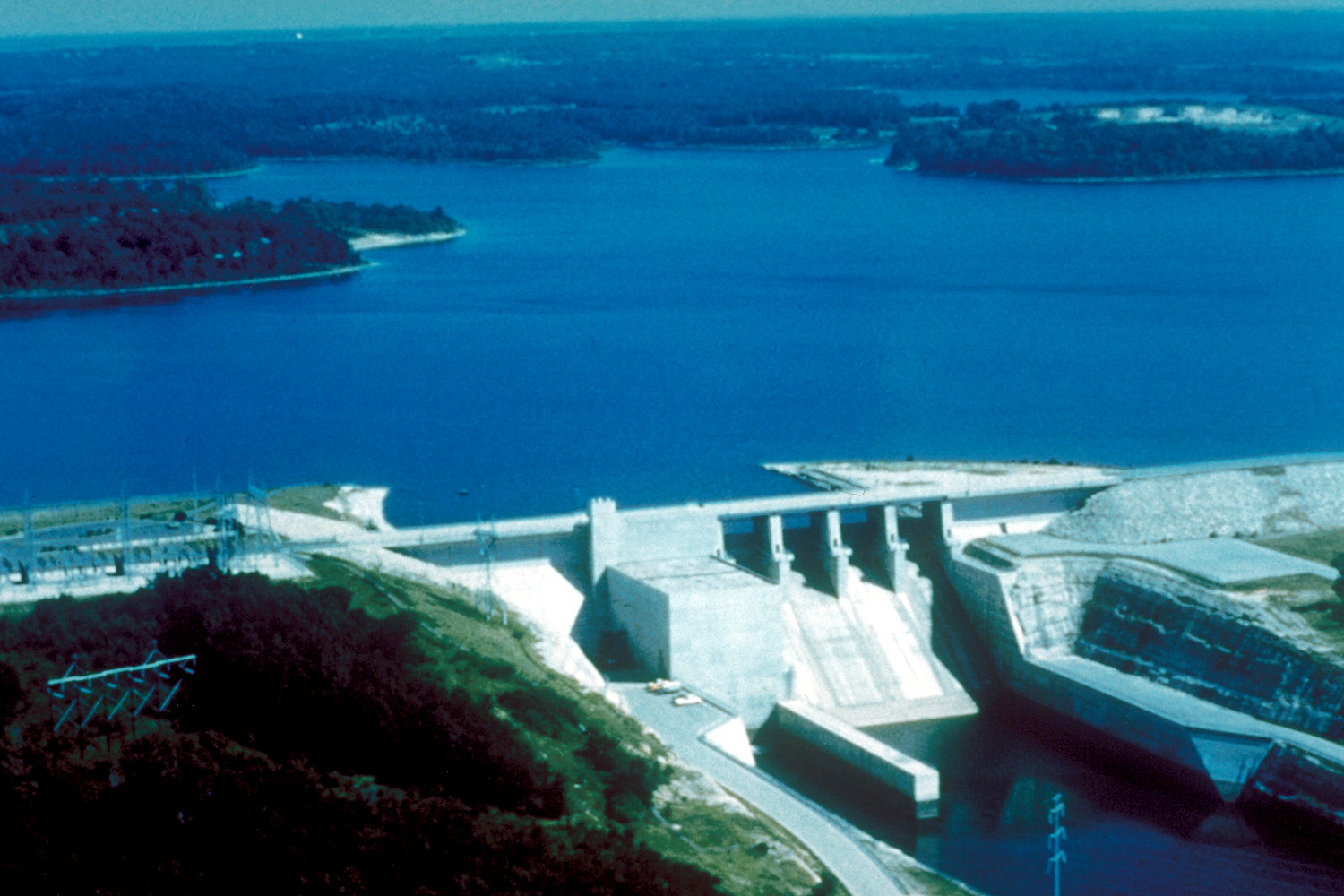
- Stockton Lake and Dam

- Location within Missouri Location within the United States
- Location: Cedar, Dade, Polk counties, Missouri, United States
- Coordinates: 37°38′34″N 93°46′15″W
- Type: Reservoir
- Primary inflows: Sac River; Little Sac River
- Primary outflows: Sac River
- Basin countries: United States
- Surface area: 39 sq mi (100 km^{2}) normal 63,200 acres (256 km^{2}) flood
- Water volume: 875,000 acre⋅ft (1.079 km^{3}) normal 1,674,000 acre⋅ft (2.065 km^{3}) flood
- Shore length^{1}: 298 miles (480 km)
- Surface elevation: 867 ft (264 m)
- ^{1} Shore length is not a well-defined measure.

Stockton Lake is a reservoir located in southeastern Cedar County, northeastern Dade County, and southwestern Polk County, Missouri. The lake is V-shaped, and covers 39 square miles (100 km^{2}), with 298 miles (480 km) of shoreline. It has three marinas, and 10 public-use areas. It has a "non-development policy," and is surrounded by unspoiled, tree-covered hills. Its banks are owned and operated by the Army Corps of Engineers.

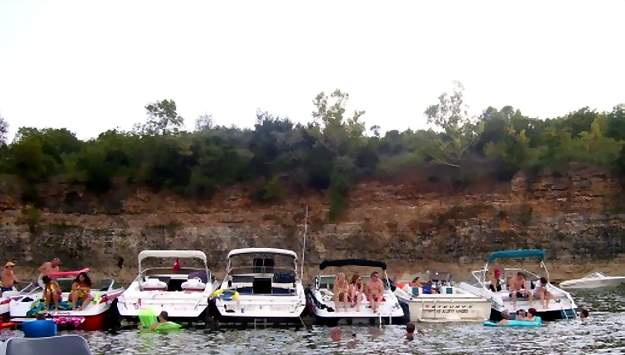
Boaters anchored together enjoying a day on Stockton Lake.

Stockton Lake is one of Missouri's seven major lakes, all man-made. It was formed by damming the Sac River near the city of Stockton in 1969. The lake is crossed by three state highways over a network of six bridges. A pipeline carries water from Stockton Lake to Fellows Lake in northern Greene County to help supplement water for the city of Springfield. Stockton lake has numerous coves protected from the wind making it a great lake to wakeboard, water ski or other water sports.

== Stockton Dam and hydroelectric power plant ==
After the USACE construction was complete on the 5,100-foot (1,600 m) dam, the lake began filling in 1969. The dam rises 153 feet (47 m) above the Sac River streambed. The lake is about 24,900 acres (10,100 ha) with 298 miles (480 km) of shoreline. Normal pool is at 867 feet (264 m) above mean sea level (msl) with storage of 875,000 acre-feet (1.079×10^{9} m^{3}). The flood storage capacity of the lake is 1,674,000 acre-feet (2.065×10^{9} m^{3}) of water at an elevation of 892 feet (272 m) msl, during which the surface area of the reservoir grows to 63,200 acres (25,600 ha). Stockton Lake is operated primarily for flood control and hydroelectric generation and originally had an installed capacity of 45.2 MW in a single electric generator.

The original powerhouse of the dam had a single 280-inch (7.112 m) six-bladed Kaplan turbine designed by Newport News Shipbuilding and Dry Dock Company and a General Electric generator rated at 45.2 MW. The original turbine was placed in service in 1973. After years of heavy vibration and a poorly matched turbine design, one of the blades catastrophically failed in February 2009, causing an immediate shutdown of the plant. The sheared off blade, weighing 9,000 pounds (4,100 kg), was later recovered from the river. The turbine runner was repaired in 2010 by welding the old blade back in place. Other cracks were also discovered and repaired at this time.

While the repaired turbine was operating, the Corps of Engineers and contractors tried to determine how to correct the issues at Stockton Dam. Analysis concluded that the original turbine was likely rated for a much different site due to its ability to spin at nearly full power without tilting the blades past their "full flat" setting. Why the turbine and generator were mismatched has not been determined. Due to the significant issues and age of the turbine, an entirely new one was custom designed for replacement in 2014-2015. Upgrades for the $48 million project include:

- The new 71,700-horsepower Kaplan turbine runner, with 7 bolt on blades (rather than 6), 75 rpm
- rewiring the generator windings of the rotor and stator
- electrical rating increase to 52 MW
- new digital excitation system, surface air coolers, and digital governor for the generator
- refurbishment of the mechanical accessories
- 161 kV main power transformer replacement
- Intake gate and draft tube bulkhead repairs
- Salvage and in-place blade repair
- emergency diesel generator replacement
- asbestos abatement and lead paint removal.

The Stockton Power Plant is a peaking plant that produces 55 GWh of average annual energy valued at $8.3 million. The new, more efficient turbine was installed in 2014 and became operational in January 2015. Part of the costs of the repair were offset by the American Recovery and Reinvestment Act. The old turbine was placed on a pedestal above the road which crosses the dam.

== Stockton Equestrian Trail ==
Stockton Lake features an equestrian trail that is approximately 15 miles long and travels in close proximity along the lake shore from Hawker Point to Orleans Trail Campgrounds. This is a multi use trail for Hikers and Mountain biking, there are no motorized vehicles allowed.

== Sailing at Stockton ==
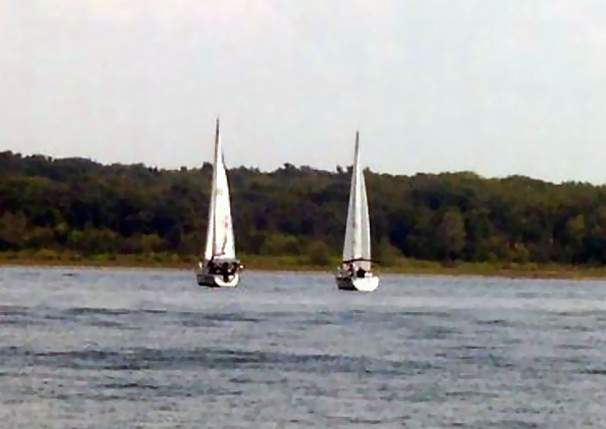
Sailing is a very popular activity at Stockton Lake.

The great sailing conditions are fueled by winds from Oklahoma and Kansas, consistently blowing from west to east across the lake. About one-third of the 300 mile lake is accessible to sailboats, the bridges across the lake on Highway 215 and 245 prevent most sail boats from going farther on the lake, but this section of lake is still an ideal location for sailing. The Stockton Yacht club holds annual races on the lake that usually draw large numbers of boats, with the most prestigious of these races being the Governor's Cup Regatta.
