= Polk County, Missouri =

County in Missouri, United States

- County
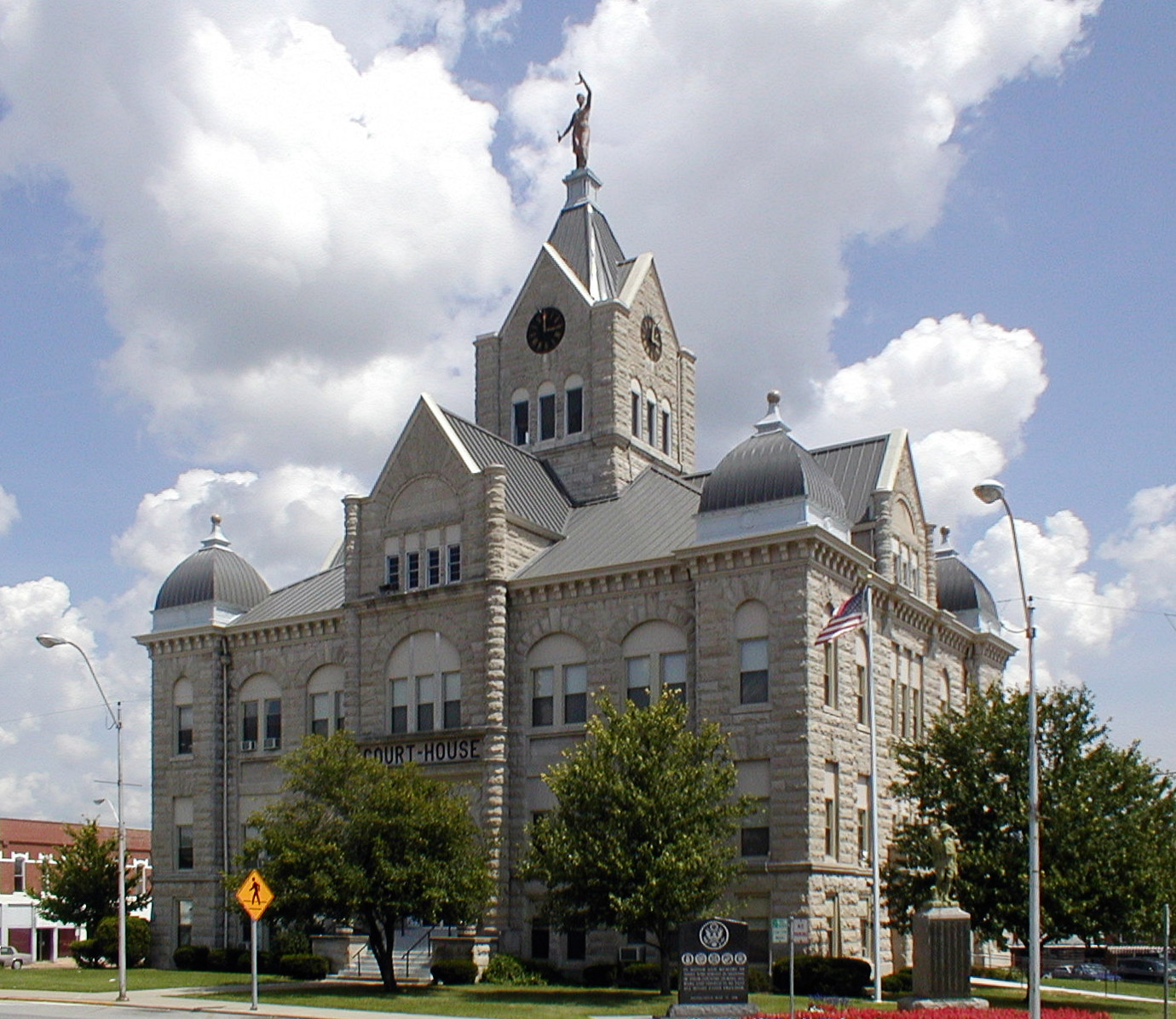
- Polk County Courthouse in Bolivar

- Location within the U.S. state of Missouri
- Coordinates: 37°37′N 93°24′W
- Country: United States
- State: Missouri
- Founded: March 13, 1835
- Named for: Ezekiel Polk
- Seat: Bolivar
- Largest city: Bolivar

Area
  - Total: 642 sq mi (1,660 km^{2})
  - Land: 636 sq mi (1,650 km^{2})
  - Water: 6.9 sq mi (18 km^{2}) 1.1%

Population (2020)
  - Total: 31,519
  - Estimate (2025): 33,604 ▲
  - Density: 49.6/sq mi (19.1/km^{2})
- Time zone: UTC−6 (Central)
  - Summer (DST): UTC−5 (CDT)
- Congressional district: 4th
- Website: polkcountymo.gov

Polk County is a county located in the southwestern portion of the U.S. state of Missouri. As of the 2020 census, the population was 31,519. According to the American Community Survey 2024 population was estimated at 32,444. The county seat is Bolivar. The county was organized January 5, 1835, and is named for Ezekiel Polk. Polk County is part of the Springfield metropolitan area.

== History ==
Polk County was separated and organized from Greene County on January 5, 1835. A supplement to the boundary change was made on March 13, 1835. Its original boundaries were later reduced in creating Dade, Dallas, and Hickory counties. It was named in honor of Col. Ezekiel Polk of Tennessee, a soldier who served under General George Washington and who was the grandfather of John Polk Campbell and Ezekiel Madison Campbell, brothers who helped to settle Polk and Greene counties. Ezekiel Polk was also the grandfather of James K. Polk, who was a member of the US House of Representatives in 1835. He was elected President of the United States in 1844.

== Geography ==
According to the United States Census Bureau, the county has a total area of 642 square miles (1,660 km^{2}), of which 636 square miles (1,650 km^{2}) is land and 6.9 square miles (18 km^{2}) (1.1%) is water.

=== Adjacent counties ===
- Hickory County (north)
- Dallas County (east)
- Greene County (south)
- Dade County (southwest)
- Cedar County (west)
- St. Clair County (northwest)

=== Major highways ===
- Route 13
- Route 32
- Route 83
- Route 123
- Route 215

=== Transit ===
- Jefferson Lines

== Demographics ==
Historical population
Census	Pop.	Note	%±
1840	8,449		—
1850	6,186		−26.8%
1860	9,995		61.6%
1870	12,445		24.5%
1880	15,734		26.4%
1890	20,339		29.3%
1900	23,255		14.3%
1910	21,561		−7.3%
1920	20,351		−5.6%
1930	17,803		−12.5%
1940	17,400		−2.3%
1950	16,062		−7.7%
1960	13,753		−14.4%
1970	15,415		12.1%
1980	18,822		22.1%
1990	21,826		16.0%
2000	26,992		23.7%
2010	31,137		15.4%
2020	31,519		1.2%
2025 (est.)	33,604	▲	6.6%
U.S. Decennial Census; 1790-1960 1900-1990; 1990-2000 2010

=== Racial and ethnic composition ===
Polk County, Missouri – Racial and ethnic composition Note: the US Census treats Hispanic/Latino as an ethnic category. This table excludes Latinos from the racial categories and assigns them to a separate category. Hispanics/Latinos may be of any race.
Race / Ethnicity (NH = Non-Hispanic)	Pop 1980	Pop 1990	Pop 2000	Pop 2010	Pop 2020	% 1980	% 1990	% 2000	% 2010	% 2020
White alone (NH)	18,560	21,384	26,024	29,565	28,682	98.61%	97.97%	96.41%	94.95%	91.00%
Black or African American alone (NH)	33	67	119	226	242	0.18%	0.31%	0.44%	0.73%	0.77%
Native American or Alaska Native alone (NH)	83	125	176	190	190	0.44%	0.57%	0.65%	0.61%	0.60%
Asian alone (NH)	21	71	51	104	131	0.11%	0.33%	0.19%	0.33%	0.42%
Native Hawaiian or Pacific Islander alone (NH)	x	x	8	9	4	x	x	0.03%	0.03%	0.01%
Other race alone (NH)	17	6	7	9	61	0.09%	0.03%	0.03%	0.03%	0.19%
Mixed race or Multiracial (NH)	x	x	257	419	1,418	x	x	0.95%	1.35%	4.50%
Hispanic or Latino (any race)	108	173	350	615	791	0.57%	0.79%	1.30%	1.98%	2.51%
Total	18,822	21,826	26,992	31,137	31,519	100.00%	100.00%	100.00%	100.00%	100.00%

=== 2020 census ===
As of the 2020 census, the county had a population of 31,519. The median age was 39.3 years. 24.1% of residents were under the age of 18 and 18.9% of residents were 65 years of age or older. For every 100 females there were 97.4 males, and for every 100 females age 18 and over there were 94.4 males age 18 and over.

The racial makeup of the county was 92.2% White, 0.8% Black or African American, 0.7% American Indian and Alaska Native, 0.4% Asian, 0.0% Native Hawaiian and Pacific Islander, 0.6% from some other race, and 5.3% from two or more races. Hispanic or Latino residents of any race comprised 2.5% of the population.

Racial composition in Polk County
Race	Num.	Perc.
White (NH)	28,682	91%
Black or African American (NH)	242	0.76%
Native American (NH)	190	0.6%
Asian (NH)	131	0.42%
Pacific Islander (NH)	4	0.01%
Other/Mixed (NH)	1,479	4.7%
Hispanic or Latino	791	2.51%

32.8% of residents lived in urban areas, while 67.2% lived in rural areas.

There were 11,992 households in the county, of which 30.6% had children under the age of 18 living with them and 23.4% had a female householder with no spouse or partner present. About 26.6% of all households were made up of individuals and 12.6% had someone living alone who was 65 years of age or older.

There were 13,387 housing units, of which 10.4% were vacant. Among occupied housing units, 69.7% were owner-occupied and 30.3% were renter-occupied. The homeowner vacancy rate was 2.0% and the rental vacancy rate was 7.2%.

=== 2000 census ===
As of the 2000 census, there were 26,992 people, 9,917 households, and 7,140 families residing in the county. The population density was 42 inhabitants per square mile (16/km^{2}). There were 11,183 housing units at an average density of 18 units per square mile (6.9/km^{2}). The racial makeup of the county was 97.26% White, 0.45% Black or African American, 0.67% Native American, 0.19% Asian, 0.03% Pacific Islander, 0.33% from other races, and 1.06% from two or more races. Approximately 1.30% of the population were Hispanic or Latino of any race.

There were 9,917 households, out of which 33.00% had children under the age of 18 living with them, 60.50% were married couples living together, 8.20% had a female householder with no husband present, and 28.00% were non-families. 23.20% of all households were made up of individuals, and 10.70% had someone living alone who was 65 years of age or older. The average household size was 2.56 and the average family size was 3.02.

In the county, the population was spread out, with 25.70% under the age of 18, 12.60% from 18 to 24, 25.50% from 25 to 44, 20.80% from 45 to 64, and 15.30% who were 65 years of age or older. The median age was 35 years. For every 100 females, there were 94.90 males. For every 100 females age 18 and over, there were 90.90 males.

The median income for a household in the county was $29,656, and the median income for a family was $35,843. Males had a median income of $25,383 versus $18,799 for females. The per capita income for the county was $13,645. About 11.10% of families and 16.30% of the population were below the poverty line, including 20.00% of those under age 18 and 12.00% of those age 65 or over.

== Education ==
=== Public libraries ===
- Polk County Public Library

=== High Schools ===
- Bolivar High School
- Halfway Secondary School
- Fair Play Secondary School
- Pleasant Hope Secondary School

=== Universities ===
- Southwest Baptist University
- Bolivar Technical College

== Media ==
The Bolivar Herald-Free Press is published twice weekly.

== Communities ==
=== Cities ===
- Bolivar (county seat)
- Fair Play
- Humansville
- Morrisville
- Pleasant Hope

=== Villages ===
- Aldrich
- Flemington
- Goodnight, from 2003 to 2016
- Halfway

=== Unincorporated communities ===
- Adonis
- Brighton
- Burns
- Cliquot
- Dunnegan
- Eudora
- Goodson
- Graydon Springs
- Huckaby
- Huron
- Karlin
- Knox
- Mohawk Corner
- Polk
- Rimby
- Rock Prairie
- Rondo
- Schofield
- Sentinel
- Slagle
- Sunset
- Tin Town
- Van
- Violet
- West Bend
- Wishart

=== Townships ===
Polk County is divided into 22 townships:

- Campbell Township
- Cliquot Township
- East Looney Township
- East Madison Township
- Flemington Township
- Jackson Township
- Jefferson Township
- Johnson Township
- McKinley Township
- Mooney Township
- North Benton Township
- North Green Township
- Northeast Marion Township
- Northwest Marion Township
- South Benton Township
- South Green Township
- Southeast Marion Township
- Southwest Marion Township
- Union Township
- West Looney Township
- West Madison Township
- Wishart Township

== Politics ==
=== Local ===
Polk County, Missouri

Elected countywide officials
Assessor	Rita Lemmon	Republican
Circuit Clerk	Tiffany Phillips	Republican
County Clerk	Rachel Lightfoot	Republican
Collector	Rachel Boyce	Republican
Commissioner (presiding)	Shannon Hancock	Republican
Commissioner (district 1)	Kyle Legan	Republican
Commissioner (district 2)	Melinda Robertson	Republican
Coroner	Jeff Witt	Republican
Prosecuting Attorney	Keaton Ashlock	Republican
Public Administrator	Barbara Davolt	Republican
Recorder	Carol Poindexter	Republican
Sheriff	Danny Morrison	Republican
Surveyor	Kevin Nelson	Republican
Treasurer	Shirley Allison	Republican

The Republican Party completely controls politics at the local level in Polk County. Republicans hold all of the elected positions in the county.

=== State ===
Past gubernatorial elections results
Year	Republican	Democratic	Third parties
2024	79.38% 12,487	18.69% 2,940	1.93% 304
2020	81.74% 12,319	16.42% 2,475	1.84% 278
2016	66.92% 9,251	30.15% 4,168	2.92% 404
2012	53.89% 7,052	43.15% 5,647	2.96% 388
2008	45.76% 6,244	49.52% 6,758	4.72% 644
2004	67.84% 8,418	30.90% 3,835	1.56% 1.26
2000	58.65% 5,996	39.79% 4,068	1.55% 159
1996	55.64% 5,043	40.51% 3,672	3.85% 349

All of Polk County is in the 128th district in the Missouri House of Representatives, and is represented by Christopher Warwick (R-Bolivar), who was elected in 2024.

Missouri House of Representatives — District 128 — Polk County (2016)
Party	Candidate	Votes	%	±%
Republican	Mike Stephens	11,500	85.48%	−14.52
Independent	Janet Sheffield	1,953	14.52%	+14.52

Missouri House of Representatives — District 128 — Polk County (2014)
Party	Candidate	Votes	%	±%
Republican	Sue Entichler	5,903	100.00%	

Missouri House of Representatives — District 128 — Polk County (2012)
Party	Candidate	Votes	%	±%
Republican	Sue Entlicher	11,744	100.00%	

All of Polk County is a part of Missouri's 28th district in the Missouri Senate, which is currently held by Republican Sandy Crawford.

Missouri Senate — District 28 — Polk County (2014)
Party	Candidate	Votes	%	±%
Republican	Mike Parson	5,832	100.00%	

=== Federal ===
U.S. Senate — Missouri — Polk County (2016)
Party	Candidate	Votes	%	±%
Republican	Roy Blunt	9,693	69.93%	+17.50
Democratic	Jason Kander	3,605	26.01%	−14.35
Libertarian	Jonathan Dine	327	2.36%	−4.85
Green	Johnathan McFarland	107	0.77%	+0.77
Constitution	Fred Ryman	129	0.93%	+0.93

U.S. Senate — Missouri — Polk County (2012)
Party	Candidate	Votes	%	±%
Republican	Todd Akin	6,789	52.43%	
Democratic	Claire McCaskill	5,226	40.36%	
Libertarian	Jonathan Dine	933	7.21%	

All of Polk county is included in Missouri's 4th congressional district and is currently represented by Mark Alford (R-Lake Winnebago) in the U.S. House of Representatives.

U.S. House of Representatives — Missouri's 7th congressional district — Polk County (2016)
Party	Candidate	Votes	%	±%
Republican	Billy Long	10,170	74.34%	+6.06
Democratic	Genevieve Williams	2,880	21.05%	−2.42
Libertarian	Benjamin T. Brixey	630	4.61%	−3.64

U.S. House of Representatives — Missouri's 7th congressional district — Polk County (2014)
Party	Candidate	Votes	%	±%
Republican	Billy Long	4,442	68.28%	+1.25
Democratic	Jim Evans	1,527	23.47%	−4.21
Libertarian	Kevin Craig	537	8.25%	+2.95

U.S. House of Representatives — Missouri’s 7th congressional district — Polk County (2012)
Party	Candidate	Votes	%	±%
Republican	Billy Long	8,631	67.03%	
Democratic	Jim Evans	3,564	27.68%	
Libertarian	Kevin Craig	682	5.30%	

==== Political culture ====
Polk County has been a Republican Party stronghold for most of its history at the presidential level. In only four presidential elections from 1896 to the present has a Democratic Party candidate carried the county, the most recent being Lyndon B. Johnson in 1964.

United States presidential election results for Polk County, Missouri
Year	Republican		Democratic		Third party(ies)	
Year	No.	%	No.	%	No.	%
1888	2,100	48.97%	1,794	41.84%	394	9.19%
1892	1,918	45.98%	1,211	29.03%	1,042	24.98%
1896	2,564	48.32%	2,711	51.09%	31	0.58%
1900	2,679	53.59%	2,178	43.57%	142	2.84%
1904	2,659	56.88%	1,807	38.65%	209	4.47%
1908	2,670	54.43%	2,139	43.61%	96	1.96%
1912	1,802	39.04%	1,935	41.92%	879	19.04%
1916	2,613	53.79%	2,149	44.24%	96	1.98%
1920	4,967	62.82%	2,847	36.01%	93	1.18%
1924	4,097	56.19%	3,033	41.60%	161	2.21%
1928	5,307	69.63%	2,303	30.22%	12	0.16%
1932	3,811	46.40%	4,355	53.03%	47	0.57%
1936	5,126	56.65%	3,899	43.09%	23	0.25%
1940	5,534	61.98%	3,380	37.86%	14	0.16%
1944	5,040	66.45%	2,527	33.32%	18	0.24%
1948	4,026	56.65%	3,079	43.32%	2	0.03%
1952	5,263	67.81%	2,474	31.88%	24	0.31%
1956	4,410	59.77%	2,968	40.23%	0	0.00%
1960	4,849	66.52%	2,440	33.48%	0	0.00%
1964	3,288	49.51%	3,353	50.49%	0	0.00%
1968	4,145	59.82%	2,170	31.32%	614	8.86%
1972	5,409	70.67%	2,245	29.33%	0	0.00%
1976	3,893	51.29%	3,663	48.26%	34	0.45%
1980	4,842	57.86%	3,336	39.87%	190	2.27%
1984	5,467	65.98%	2,819	34.02%	0	0.00%
1988	5,030	59.39%	3,419	40.37%	21	0.25%
1992	3,465	39.94%	3,316	38.22%	1,894	21.83%
1996	4,521	49.74%	3,307	36.38%	1,261	13.87%
2000	6,430	62.46%	3,606	35.03%	258	2.51%
2004	8,586	68.95%	3,775	30.31%	92	0.74%
2008	8,956	65.39%	4,553	33.24%	188	1.37%
2012	9,252	70.52%	3,580	27.29%	287	2.19%
2016	10,438	75.84%	2,631	19.12%	694	5.04%
2020	11,850	78.66%	2,885	19.15%	329	2.18%
2024	12,691	80.19%	2,948	18.63%	187	1.18%

=== Missouri presidential preference primary (2008) ===
Former Governor Mike Huckabee (R-Arkansas) received more votes, a total of 2,317, than any candidate from either party in Polk County during the 2008 presidential primary.

== See also ==
- National Register of Historic Places listings in Polk County, Missouri
