= Greasy Creek (Niangua River tributary) =

Stream in the American state of Missouri

Greasy Creek is a stream in Dallas and Webster counties the Ozarks of southwest Missouri. It is a tributary of the Niangua River.

The stream headwaters are located at 37°26′22″N 93°03′28″W and the confluence with the Niangua River is at 37°39′43″N 93°02′30″W. The source waters of the stream arise in northwest Webster County west of Elkland. The stream flows north into Dallas County, turns northwest and crosses under Missouri Route 38 west of March and east of Redtop. The stream then flows north to northeast parallel to U.S. Route 65 to its west and crosses under Missouri Route 32 just east of Buffalo and enters the Niangua to the northeast of Buffalo.

Greasy Creek was named due to the presence of oil or grease in the water. The oily nature reportedly was the result of an early spill of bacon or ham into the water.

== See also ==
- List of rivers of Missouri
