= Jakes Creek =

Stream in the U.S. state of Missouri

Jakes Creek is a stream in northeastern Dallas County in the U.S. state of Missouri. It is a tributary of the Niangua River.

The stream headwaters arise at 37°44′42″N 92°59′41″W at an elevation of approximately 1160 feet just north of Missouri Route 64 and the communities of Plad and Wood Hill. The stream flows northeast passing through the Lead Mine Conservation Area to its confluence with the Niangua River south of the community of Celt, at 37°51′34″N 92°54′20″W and an elevation of 741 feet.

A variant name is Jaques Creek, but the identity of the namesake is unknown.

== See also ==
- List of rivers of Missouri
