= Foose, Missouri =

Unincorporated community in Missouri, U.S.

Coordinates: 37°33′41″N 93°08′48″W

Foose is an unincorporated community in western Dallas County, in the U.S. state of Missouri. The community lies on Missouri Route EE, just west of U.S. Route 65, approximately seven miles south-southwest of Buffalo. The Dallas-Polk county line is two miles west along Route EE. The community is at an elevation of 1207 feet and Greasy Creek, a tributary of the Niangua River, drains the area to the east of Route 65.

== History ==
A post office called Foose was established in 1893, and remained in operation until 1905. The community most likely derives its name from Foosland, Illinois, the native home of a share of the first settlers.
