= Red top =

Red Top, Red-top or Redtop may refer to:

== Places ==
- Red Top, Webster County, Missouri, US
- Redtop, Dallas County, Missouri, US
- Red Top Mountain State Park in Georgia, US
- Redtop Mountain, Canada
- Red Top Cottage, Harvard's training facility for the Harvard–Yale Regatta
- Redtop (Belmont, Massachusetts), a historic house

== Other uses ==
- Red tops, British tabloid newspapers
- Redtop grass (Agrostis gigantea)
- Brewster Red Tops, now the Brewster Whitecaps, a Massachusetts collegiate summer baseball team
- Hawker Siddeley Red Top, an air-to-air missile
- Red top tube, a blood collection container
- Red Top Young (1936–2021), blues musician
- "Red Top", a song by Don Patterson on his album Four Dimensions
- Red Top, or C20LET, a 2.0L Turbo engine produced by Vauxhall/Opel in the 1990s
