= Windyville, Missouri =

Unincorporated community in Missouri, U.S.

Coordinates: 37°42′24″N 92°55′38″W

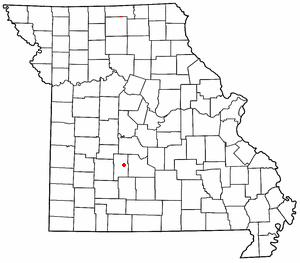

Windyville is an Unincorporated community in Dallas County, Missouri, United States. It is located approximately 10 miles northeast of Buffalo along Missouri routes K and MM. The Niangua River flows past to the south and east of the community. It is part of the Springfield, Missouri Metropolitan Statistical Area

A post office called Windyville was established in 1921, and remained in operation until 1998. The community was so named for the frequently windy conditions at the town site.

== Population ==
In 2020 there were 54 people that are housed in Windyville, Missouri. The population has dropped 66.7% in the last 20 years. It is 100% Caucasian. The married populace is also 100%. The community is 56.9% female and 43.1% male. Windyville is a little but well-established community.
