= Branch, Missouri =

Unincorporated community in Missouri, U.S.

Branch
- Unincorporated community
- Location of Branch in Missouri
- Coordinates: 37°54′39″N 93°00′19″W
- Country: United States
- State: Missouri
- County: Camden
- Established: 1899

Branch is an unincorporated community in southwestern Camden County, Missouri, United States. It is located on Route 73 one mile south of U.S. Route 54. Macks Creek is four miles to the northeast. Tunas is approximately four miles south on Route 73 in Dallas County.

A post office called Branch was established in 1899, and remained in operation until 1968. The origin of the name Branch is uncertain.
