= Mill Creek (Niangua River tributary) =

Stream in the U.S. state of Missouri

Mill Creek is a stream in northern Dallas County in the Ozarks of southwest Missouri. It is a tributary of the Niangua River.

The stream headwaters are at 37°52′38″N 92°56′57″W and the confluence with the Niangua is at 37°52′43″N 92°53′06″W. The stream source area lies east of Missouri Route 73 and it flows east passing north of the Lead Mine Conservation Area. It flows parallel to Missouri Route E and past the community of Celt prior to its confluence with the Niangua River.

Mill Creek was named on account of the watermills along its course.

== See also ==
- List of rivers of Missouri
