= Corkery, Missouri =

Extinct village in Missouri Ozarks

Coordinates: 37°47′43″N 92°51′41″W

Corkery is an unincorporated place in Dallas and Laclede counties, in the U.S. state of Missouri. The GNIS classifies it as a populated place. The now extinct community is located on a ridge surrounded on three sides by an entrenched meander of the Niangua River which is about 300 feet below the ridgetop. The location is only accessible by road from Laclede County.

The immediate area is known today as a resort destination for canoeing and camping, north of the popular recreational region of Bennett Springs.

== History ==
The community was named after either Mike Corkery, a local merchant, or Ed Corkery, a millwright who came to the area in 1863 to install millworks and ended up staying, opening a store, and becoming the first postmaster. A post office called Corkery was officially established in 1893, and remained in operation until 1944.

Corkery was once a thriving town and became the main crossroads for the region "because of the natural ford which people crossed by foot, horseback and wagon." The timber industry and tie rafting along the Niangua River and other traffic "made mail service a necessity."

Today, only ruins remain: "...the bridge piers, the graveyard, the graffitied building, the spring house, the crumbling cement retaining wall against the bluff, the shop building foundations, the general store steps...."

The Corkery Cemetery Preservation Society is preserving the cemetery here.

A low bridge across the Niangua River existed for a time before it was washed out. Construction began in 1918 on a higher bridge. It was located near the end of Jugtown Road out of Leadmine that would have crossed the Niangua River near here, at Low Gap, about a quarter mile from the village. The bridge was supposed to help renew the economy, but the grist mill closed and someone was said to have absconded with the state-provided construction funds. Consequently, the bridge and roadway were never finished: its three tall piers remain as a topic of conversation for the hundreds of canoeists who pass by annually.
