= Spring Grove =

Spring Grove may refer to

== Locations ==
=== United Kingdom ===
- Spring Grove, London
- Spring Grove, County Fermanagh, a townland in County Fermanagh, Northern Ireland

=== United States ===
- Spring Grove, Florida
- Spring Grove, Illinois
- Spring Grove, Indiana
- Spring Grove Hospital Center near Baltimore, Maryland
- Spring Grove, Minnesota
- Spring Grove Township, Minnesota
- Spring Grove, Missouri
- Spring Grove Township, Harlan County, Nebraska
- Spring Grove Historic District, Toledo, Ohio, listed on the NRHP in Ohio
- Spring Grove, Pennsylvania
  - Spring Grove Borough Historic District, listed on the NRHP in Pennsylvania
- Spring Grove, Virginia
- Spring Grove (Mount Holly, Virginia), listed on the NRHP in Virginia
- Spring Grove (Oak Corner, Virginia), listed on the NRHP in Virginia
- Spring Grove, Wisconsin, a town
- Spring Grove, Green Lake County, Wisconsin, an unincorporated community

== See also ==
- Spring Grove Cemetery (disambiguation)
