= Wall Street, Missouri =

- Unincorporated community
- Location within Missouri Location within the United States
- Coordinates: 37°36′45″N 92°57′18″W
- Country: United States
- State: Missouri
- County: Dallas
- Elevation: 1,194 ft (364 m)
- Time zone: UTC-6 (Central (CST))
  - Summer (DST): UTC-5 (CDT)
- GNIS feature ID: 728274

Wall Street is an unincorporated community in Dallas County, Missouri, United States. The community is located on Missouri Route 32, east of Buffalo and approximately 2.5 miles west of Long Lane.

The settlement's name was given by local residents as "a mocking or slurring name". A post office was established in 1902, and remained in operation until 1907.

As of 1970, three families resided in Wall Street.
