= Woodhill =

Woodhill or Wood Hill may refer to:

== People ==
- Herbert Woodhilll (1875–1963), Australian rugby league footballer
- Joan Mary Woodhill (1912–1990), Australian dietitian
- Constance Caroline Woodhill Naden (1858–1889), English poet and philosopher

== Places ==
=== Australia ===
- Woodhill, New South Wales
- Woodhill, Queensland, a locality in the City of Logan

=== New Zealand ===
- Woodhill, Auckland
- Woodhill, Whangārei, Northland Region

=== United Kingdom ===
- Woodhill, Angus, Scotland
- Woodhill (HM Prison), a maximum security prison in Milton Keynes, England
- Woodhill Road Halt railway station, a disused railway station in Bury, England
- Woods Mill

=== United States ===
- Woodhill (RTA Rapid Transit station), a railway station in Cleveland, Ohio
- Wood Hill, Missouri
- Wood Hills, a mountain range in Elko County, Nevada
- Wood Mill, Virginia
