= Ha Ha Tonka =

Ha Ha Tonka may refer to:

- Ha Ha Tonka State Park, a state park in Missouri, United States
- Ha Ha Tonka (band), an American rock band
