= Plad, Missouri =

Unincorporated community in Missouri, U.S.

Coordinates: 37°44′55″N 92°58′32″W

Plad is an unincorporated community in northeast Dallas County, in the U.S. state of Missouri. The community is on Missouri Route 64 five miles east of Pumpkin Center and nine miles northeast of Buffalo. The headwaters of Jakes Creek arise just to the northwest of the community.

== History ==
A post office called Glad was established in 1891, and remained in operation until 1960. The community's name was supposed to signify that the townspeople were "Glad" they had finally secured a post office (a postal error accounts for the error in spelling, which was never corrected).
