= Spring Grove, Missouri =

Unincorporated community in Missouri, U.S.

Coordinates: 37°33′07″N 93°02′16″W

Spring Grove is an unincorporated community in Dallas County, in the U.S. state of Missouri. The community is situated on Missouri Route H and the Niangua River flows past, about 1.5 miles to the east. Buffalo is approximately six miles to the north-northwest.

== History ==
A post office called Spring Grove was established in 1854, and remained in operation until 1906. A spring within a nearby grove accounts for the name.
