= Charity, Missouri =

Unincorporated community in Missouri, U.S.

Coordinates: 37°30′55″N 93°00′59″W

Charity is an unincorporated community in southern Dallas County, in the U.S. state of Missouri.

The community is on Missouri Route M approximately one mile west of the Niangua River. The Charity School buildings lie about one-half mile north on a county road. Elkland is about six miles south on Missouri Route 38 and Buffalo lies about nine miles to the north-northwest.

== History ==
A post office at Charity was established in 1884, and remained in operation until 1956. An early postmaster gave the community the name of his wife, Charity Sherrick.
