= Woolsey Creek =

Stream in the U.S. state of Missouri

Woolsey Creek is a stream in Camden and Laclede counties the Ozarks of south central Missouri. Woolsey Creek is a tributary to the Niangua River. The stream enters the Niangua just upstream (south) of Lake Niangua.

The stream headwaters are at 37°50′08″N 92°45′14″W and the confluence with the Niangua is at 37°54′34″N 92°51′30″W.

Woolsey Creek was named after Daniel Woolsey, a pioneer citizen.

== See also ==
- List of rivers of Missouri
