= Redtop, Missouri =

Community in Dallas County, Missouri, US

- Unincorporated community
- Location within Missouri Location within the United States
- Coordinates: 37°30′13″N 93°08′39″W
- Country: United States
- State: Missouri
- County: Dallas
- Township: Jasper
- Elevation: 1,217 ft (371 m)
- Time zone: UTC-6 (Central (CST))
  - Summer (DST): UTC-5 (CDT)
- GNIS feature ID: 737911

Redtop is an unincorporated community in Dallas County, Missouri, United States. It is located west of U.S. Route 65 (on an older alignment of the highway), approximately 9 mi (14 km) south of Buffalo.

Redtop is part of the Springfield, Missouri Metropolitan Statistical Area.

== History ==
A post office was established in 1889 or earlier, and was named "Cassity" after the postmaster, T.N. Cassity. Because the name was similar to "Cassidy", a post office in southern Missouri, the name was changed to "Marmaduke", after Confederate general John S. Marmaduke. That name was too long for the postal ring or stamp, and again needed to be changed. Cassity's wife suggested "redtop", which was a type of grass (Agrostis gigantea) which grew in a large field behind the store in which the office was housed, and which had a reddish color when ripe.

The post office was later moved to U.S. Route 65.
