= Boyd, Missouri =

Unincorporated community in Missouri

Coordinates: 37°30′07″N 93°04′33″W

Boyd was an unincorporated community in Dallas County, in the U.S. state of Missouri. The community was located approximately two miles west-southwest of Charity.

== History ==
A post office called Boyd was established in 1864, and remained in operation until 1887. The community has the name of Gregory Boyd, a pioneer citizen.
