= Reynolds, Dallas County, Missouri =

Unincorporated community in Missouri, U.S.

Coordinates: 37°38′19″N 93°09′29″W

Reynolds is an unincorporated community in western Dallas County, in the U.S. state of Missouri.

The community is located approximately three miles west of Buffalo on Missouri Route 32. Lindley Creek flows past approximately one-half mile to the east. Reynolds Chapel and cemetery are about one mile north on a county road.

== History ==
A post office called Reynolds was established in 1891, and remained in operation until 1897. The community has the name of Mark Reynolds, a pioneer citizen.
