= Bruner, Missouri =

- Community
- Location in the state of Missouri Bruner (the United States)
- Coordinates: 37°00′53″N 92°59′10″W
- Country: United States
- State: Missouri
- County: Christian County
- Elevation: 446 m (1,463 ft)
- Time zone: UTC-6 (CST)
  - Summer (DST): UTC-5 (CDT)
- Zip code: 65620

Bruner is an unincorporated community in northeast Christian County, Missouri, United States. It is located approximately five miles east of Sparta and two miles west of Elkhead along Route 14. Bruner is part of the Springfield, Missouri Metropolitan Statistical Area.

A post office is located in Bruner on the north side of Route 14. The post office was established in 1895.

James A. Rathbun moved to the region in 1862 and settled near Keltner. About two years later he moved and established a store and post office near the current location of Bruner. He established a post office and settled on the name of Bruner after his first choice, Rathbun, was denied because a Rathbun office was already in use.
