= Olive, Missouri =

Unincorporated community in Missouri, U.S.

Coordinates: 37°27′33″N 93°06′32″W

Olive is an unincorporated community in southeastern Dallas County, in the U.S. state of Missouri.

The community is located on Missouri Route O approximately two miles east of U.S. Route 65. Fair Grove in northeast Greene County is approximately six miles south along Route 65 and Elkland in northwest Webster County is about six miles to the east on Missouri Route AA.

== History ==
A post office called Olive was established in 1884, and remained in operation until 1907. The community took its name from a nearby Baptist church of the same name.
