= H17 =

H17 or H-17 may refer to:

- Postal Highway; Hulaki Rajmarg or Padma Road, a highway in terai region of Nepal
- British NVC community H17, a type of heath community in the British National Vegetation Classification
- Buffalo Municipal Airport (Missouri)
- German H17-206, a German steam locomotive
- Heaven 17, an English electronic band
- Highway H17 (Ukraine), a road in Ukraine
- HMS Escapade (H17), a Royal Navy E-class destroyer
- HMS H17, a H-class submarine order by but never commissioned into the Royal Navy
- Hughes H-17, an American helicopter project
- London Buses route H17, a Transport for London contracted bus route
