= Saddlebrooke, Missouri =

- Village
- Location of Saddlebrooke, Missouri
- Coordinates: 36°49′32″N 93°12′12″W
- Country: United States
- State: Missouri
- County: Christian, Taney

Area
  - Total: 5.32 sq mi (13.79 km^{2})
  - Land: 5.32 sq mi (13.79 km^{2})
  - Water: 0 sq mi (0.00 km^{2})
- Elevation: 974 ft (297 m)

Population (2020)
  - Total: 309
  - Density: 58.0/sq mi (22.41/km^{2})
- Time zone: UTC-6 (Central (CST))
  - Summer (DST): UTC-5 (CDT)
- ZIP code: 65630
- Area code: 417
- FIPS code: 29-63857
- GNIS feature ID: 2399153

Saddlebrooke is a village located in southern Christian County, Missouri, on U.S. Route 65. A small portion of the village extends into Taney County. It is a master-planned community which incorporated in 2003. The population was 309 at the time of the 2020 census.

The Christian County portion of the village is part of the Springfield metropolitan area, while the Taney County portion is part of the Branson, Missouri micropolitan area.

== Geography ==
According to the United States Census Bureau, the village has a total area of 7.01 square miles (18.16 km^{2}), all land.

== Demographics ==
Historical population
Census	Pop.	Note	%±
2010	202		—
2020	309		53.0%
U.S. Decennial Census

At the 2010 census, there were 202 people, 77 households and 68 families residing in the village. The population density was 28.8 inhabitants per square mile (11.1/km^{2}). There were 87 housing units at an average density of 12.4 units per square mile (4.8 units/km^{2}). The racial makeup was 91.1% White, 1.5% Native American, 0.5% Asian, 3.0% from other races, and 4.0% from two or more races. Hispanic or Latino of any race were 4.5% of the population.

There were 77 households, of which 27.3% had children under the age of 18 living with them, 83.1% were married couples living together, 3.9% had a female householder with no husband present, 1.3% had a male householder with no wife present, and 11.7% were non-families. 6.5% of all households were made up of individuals. The average household size was 2.62 and the average family size was 2.75.

The median age was 51.4 years. 20.3% of residents were under the age of 18; 3.9% were between the ages of 18 and 24; 16% were from 25 to 44; 44.1% were from 45 to 64; and 15.8% were 65 years of age or older. The gender makeup was 51.0% male and 49.0% female.

== Education ==
Most of the Christian County portion is in Spokane R-VII School District. A portion is in the Chadwick R-I School District.

The Taney County portion is in Branson Public Schools.
