= Chestnutridge, Missouri =

Unincorporated community in Missouri, U.S.

Coordinates: 36°50′12″N 93°15′07″W

Chestnutridge is an unincorporated community in southwestern Christian County, Missouri, United States and is located approximately fourteen miles south of Ozark and about 3.5 miles southeast of Spokane. The community is located on Chestnut Ridge, at an elevation of 1325 feet. It is on Missouri Route BB just east of Missouri Route 176 and about two miles west of U.S. Route 65.

Chesnutridge is part of the Springfield, Missouri Metropolitan Statistical Area.

A post office called Chestnutridge has been in operation since 1902. The community takes its name from a nearby ridge of the same name where chestnut trees were abundant.
