= Mathis, Missouri =

Unincorporated community in Missouri, U.S.

Coordinates: 37°43′18″N 93°09′56″W

Mathis is an unincorporated community in Dallas County, in the U.S. state of Missouri.

== History ==
A post office called Mathis was established in 1903, and closed in 1905. Tom Mathis, an early postmaster, gave the community his last name.
