= Plano, Missouri =

Unincorporated community in Missouri

Coordinates: 37°11′34″N 93°33′03″W

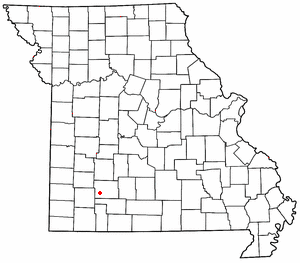

Plano is an unincorporated community on former U.S. Route 66, now Route 266 in Greene County, Missouri, United States. The community is part of the Springfield, Missouri Metropolitan Statistical Area.

A post office called Plano was established in 1895, and remained in operation until 1903. The name most likely is a transfer from Plano, Texas. Little remains of the original community.
