= Bill Thomas (basketball) =

American basketball coach (1931–2023)

Biographical details
- Born: October 4, 1931; Buffalo, Missouri, U.S.
- Died: April 15, 2023 (aged 91); Springfield, Missouri, U.S.

Playing career
- 1950–1953: Southwest Missouri State
- Position: Point guard

Coaching career (HC unless noted)
- 1956–1964: Southwest Missouri State (assistant)
- 1964–1980: Southwest Missouri State

Head coaching record
- Overall: 265–158

Accomplishments and honors

Championships
- As player: 2 NAIA national (1952, 1953); As coach: 8 MIAA regular season (1966–1970, 1973, 1974, 1978)

Awards
- NABC Division II Coach of the Year (1974)

William James Thomas (October 4, 1931 – April 15, 2023) was an American college basketball player and coach. He both played and coached at Southwest Missouri State College (now Missouri State University).

A Buffalo, Missouri native, Thomas played college basketball at Southwest Missouri State in Springfield, where he played as a guard and helped lead the team to NAIA national championships in 1952 and 1953. He returned to the school in 1956 to take an assistant coaching position under head coach Edwin Matthews. When Matthews unexpectedly died in 1964, Thomas was promoted to head coach.

Thomas spent 16 seasons as the Bears' coach, compiling a record of 265–158 and winning eight Mid-America Intercollegiate Athletics Association (MIAA) championships, including five in a row from 1966 to 1970. He led the team to three College Division (now called Division II) runner-up finishes, in 1967, 1969 and 1974. In 1974, Thomas was named the small college national coach of the year.

Thomas retired from coaching after the 1979–80 season but continued to teach physical education at the school until his full retirement in 1997. Thomas died in Springfield, Missouri, on April 15, 2023, at the age of 91.
