= Handley, Missouri =

Unincorporated community in Missouri, U.S.

Coordinates: 37°31′42″N 92°55′47″W

Handley is an unincorporated community in Dallas County, in the U.S. state of Missouri.

== History ==
A post office called Handley was established in 1900, and remained in operation until 1905. J. M. Handley, an early postmaster, gave the community his last name.
