= Buffalo High School (Buffalo, Missouri) =

Coordinates: 37.643763°N 93.096288°W

Location
- 500 W Main St; Buffalo, Missouri 65622; United States

Information
- Type: Public
- Principal: Cheryl Knox
- Teaching staff: 32.58 (FTE)
- Enrollment: 511 (2024–2025)
- Student to teacher ratio: 15.68
- Colors: Black, white and red
- Mascot: Bison
- Website: bhs.bisonpride.org

Buffalo High School is located off of Main Street in Buffalo, Missouri, United States, and is part of the Dallas R-I County School District.

It is ranked 299-455th within Missouri. The minority enrollment is 7%, and 46% of students are considered to be low-income. Buffalo High School is one of two high schools in the Dallas Co. R-I School District.

- Bill Thomas, college basketball coach (Southwest Missouri State)
