= Boaz, Missouri =

Unincorporated community in Missouri, U.S.

Coordinates: 37°01′07″N 93°24′02″W

Boaz is an unincorporated community in Christian County, Missouri, United States. Boaz is part of the Springfield, Missouri Metropolitan Statistical Area. The community is located approximately seven miles southwest of Nixa and is about five miles east of Clever.

A post office called Boaz was established in 1893, and remained in operation until 1914. The community derives its name from Boaz, a figure in the Hebrew Bible.
