= Fremont Hills, Missouri =

- City
- Location of Fremont Hills, Missouri
- Coordinates: 37°3′56″N 93°15′10″W
- Country: United States
- State: Missouri
- County: Christian

Area
  - Total: 0.55 sq mi (1.43 km^{2})
  - Land: 0.55 sq mi (1.43 km^{2})
  - Water: 0 sq mi (0.00 km^{2})
- Elevation: 1,286 ft (392 m)

Population (2020)
  - Total: 1,049
  - Density: 1,897/sq mi (732.3/km^{2})
- Time zone: UTC-6 (Central (CST))
  - Summer (DST): UTC-5 (CDT)
- ZIP code: 65714
- Area code: 417
- FIPS code: 29-25957
- GNIS feature ID: 1669600
- Website: https://fremonthills.gov/

Fremont Hills is a city in southwestern Missouri in the heart of the Ozarks. It is named after General John C. Fremont, who did some of the first surveys in the area as early as 1845. Located in Christian County, Missouri, it is situated just west of the CC & 65 highway interchange, one of the main highways to Branson, Missouri. Christian County is one of the fastest growing counties in the state. Home to one of premiere golf courses in the area with a recreational area, pool, bar/restaurant at the Fremont Hills Country Club. The city is a golf community where you will see golf carts on the tree lined streets about as often as you do cars. The city is ranked 324 in the state by size in the latest census with a growth rate of +4.10%. The population was 1,049 at the 2020 census. It is part of the Springfield, Missouri Metropolitan Statistical Area.

== Geography ==
Fremont Hills is located at 37°3′56″N 93°15′10″W (37.065582, -93.252872). According to the United States Census Bureau, the city has a total area of 0.55 square miles (1.42 km^{2}), all land.

== Demographics ==
Historical population
| Census | Pop. | Note | %± |
|---|---|---|---|
| 1990 | 201 | | — |
| 2000 | 597 | | 197.0% |
| 2010 | 826 | | 38.4% |
| 2020 | 1,049 | | 27.0% |
U.S. Decennial Census

=== 2010 census ===
As of the census of 2010, there were 826 people, 319 households, and 272 families living in the city. The population density was 1,501.8 inhabitants per square mile (579.8/km^{2}). There were 345 housing units at an average density of 627.3 per square mile (242.2/km^{2}). The racial makeup of the city was 97.5% White, 0.2% African American, 0.4% Native American, 0.6% Asian, 0.1% from other races, and 1.2% from two or more races. Hispanic or Latino of any race were 0.8% of the population.

There were 319 households, of which 29.2% had children under the age of 18 living with them, 82.8% were married couples living together, 1.6% had a female householder with no husband present, 0.9% had a male householder with no wife present, and 14.7% were non-families. 11.0% of all households were made up of individuals, and 4.4% had someone living alone who was 65 years of age or older. The average household size was 2.59 and the average family size was 2.80.

The median age in the city was 49.7 years. 21.1% of residents were under the age of 18; 5.5% were between the ages of 18 and 24; 17.6% were from 25 to 44; 36% were from 45 to 64; and 20% were 65 years of age or older. The gender makeup of the city was 51.3% male and 48.7% female.

=== 2000 census ===
As of the census of 2000, there were 597 people, 224 households, and 191 families living in the city. The population density was 1,147.0 inhabitants per square mile (442.9/km^{2}). There were 230 housing units at an average density of 441.9 per square mile (170.6/km^{2}). The racial makeup of the city was 98.16% White, 0.17% Native American, 0.50% Asian, 0.50% from other races, and 0.67% from two or more races. Hispanic or Latino of any race were 0.84% of the population.

There were 224 households, out of which 34.4% had children under the age of 18 living with them, 80.8% were married couples living together, 4.0% had a female householder with no husband present, and 14.3% were non-families. 11.2% of all households were made up of individuals, and 1.3% had someone living alone who was 65 years of age or older. The average household size was 2.67 and the average family size was 2.85.

In the city the population was spread out, with 23.6% under the age of 18, 4.4% from 18 to 24, 25.3% from 25 to 44, 37.4% from 45 to 64, and 9.4% who were 65 years of age or older. The median age was 43 years. For every 100 females, there were 100.3 males. For every 100 females age 18 and over, there were 103.6 males.

The median income for a household in the city was $87,863, and the median income for a family was $94,346. Males had a median income of $66,250 versus $32,292 for females. The per capita income for the city was $39,895. About 2.9% of families and 3.5% of the population were below the poverty line, including 5.7% of those under age 18 and none of those age 65 or over.
