= Long Lane, Missouri =

- Unincorporated community
- Long Lane in October 2026

- Location within Missouri Location within the United States
- Coordinates: 37°36′41″N 92°54′34″W
- Country: United States
- State: Missouri
- County: Dallas
- Elevation: 1,135 ft (346 m)
- Time zone: UTC-6 (Central (CST))
  - Summer (DST): UTC-5 (CDT)
- ZIP code: 65590
- Area code: 417
- GNIS feature ID: 721551

Long Lane is an unincorporated community in Dallas County, Missouri, United States. It is located on Route 32, eleven miles east of Buffalo.

Long Lane is part of the Springfield, Missouri Metropolitan Statistical Area.

== History ==
Long Lane was founded in 1845. The community was named for the relatively long road leading to the original town site. A post office called Long Lane has been in operation since 1850.

== Features ==
The town contains the Long Lane Volunteer Fire Department.

== School ==
Long Lane students attend school in Buffalo Missouri due to school consolidation closing the elementary school in town.
