= Red Top, Missouri =

Unincorporated community in Missouri, U.S.

Coordinates: 37°17′59″N 93°00′38″W

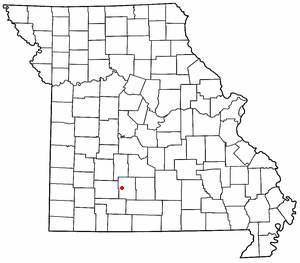

Red Top is an unincorporated community in Webster County, Missouri, United States. It is located just south of I-44 on former U.S. Route 66 (now Missouri Supplemental Route OO). It is two miles northwest of Northview or six miles southwest of Marshfield, and six miles northeast of Strafford. The Pomme de Terre River flows past approximately one mile to the northeast.

Red Top is part of the Springfield, Missouri Metropolitan Statistical Area.
