= Shady Grove, Dallas County, Missouri =

Unincorporated community in Missouri, U.S.

Coordinates: 37°30′34″N 92°52′48″W

Shady Grove is an unincorporated community in southeast Dallas County, in the U.S. state of Missouri. The community was located on Route M, approximately five miles west of Conway. The Shady Grove School was just south of Route M, near the headwaters of Goose Creek.

== History ==
A post office called Shady Grove was established in 1846, and remained in operation until 1861. The community was named for shade trees near the original town site.
