= Sweet Hollow Creek =

Stream in the American state of Missouri

Sweet Hollow Creek is a stream in Laclede County in the Ozarks of southern Missouri. The stream source area lies just west of Eldridge and it flows generally west to enter an entrenched meander of the Niangua River at Blue Spring.

The headwaters are at 37°49′56″N 92°46′11″W and the confluence with the Niangua River is at 37°50′03″N 92°50′22″W.

Sweet Hollow Creek has the name of A. N. Sweet, a pioneer settler.

== See also ==
- List of rivers of Missouri
