= Jasper Township, Dallas County, Missouri =

Township in Dallas County, Missouri, U.S.

Coordinates: 37.7130962°N 92.9348237°W

Jasper Township is an inactive township in Dallas County, in the U.S. state of Missouri.

Jasper Township was organized in 1841, taking its name from William Jasper, a soldier and casualty in the American Revolutionary War.
