= Celt, Missouri =

Unincorporated community in Dallas County, Missouri, United States

- Unincorporated community
- Location within Missouri Location within the United States
- Coordinates: 37°52′33″N 92°54′06″W
- Country: United States
- State: Missouri
- County: Dallas
- Elevation: 755 ft (230 m)
- Time zone: UTC-6 (Central (CST))
  - Summer (DST): UTC-5 (CDT)
- GNIS feature ID: 740731

Celt is an unincorporated community in Dallas County, Missouri, United States. It is located along Missouri Route E on the north bank of Mill Creek. It is approximately 19 mi (31 km) northeast of Buffalo. Celt is part of the Springfield, Missouri Metropolitan Area.

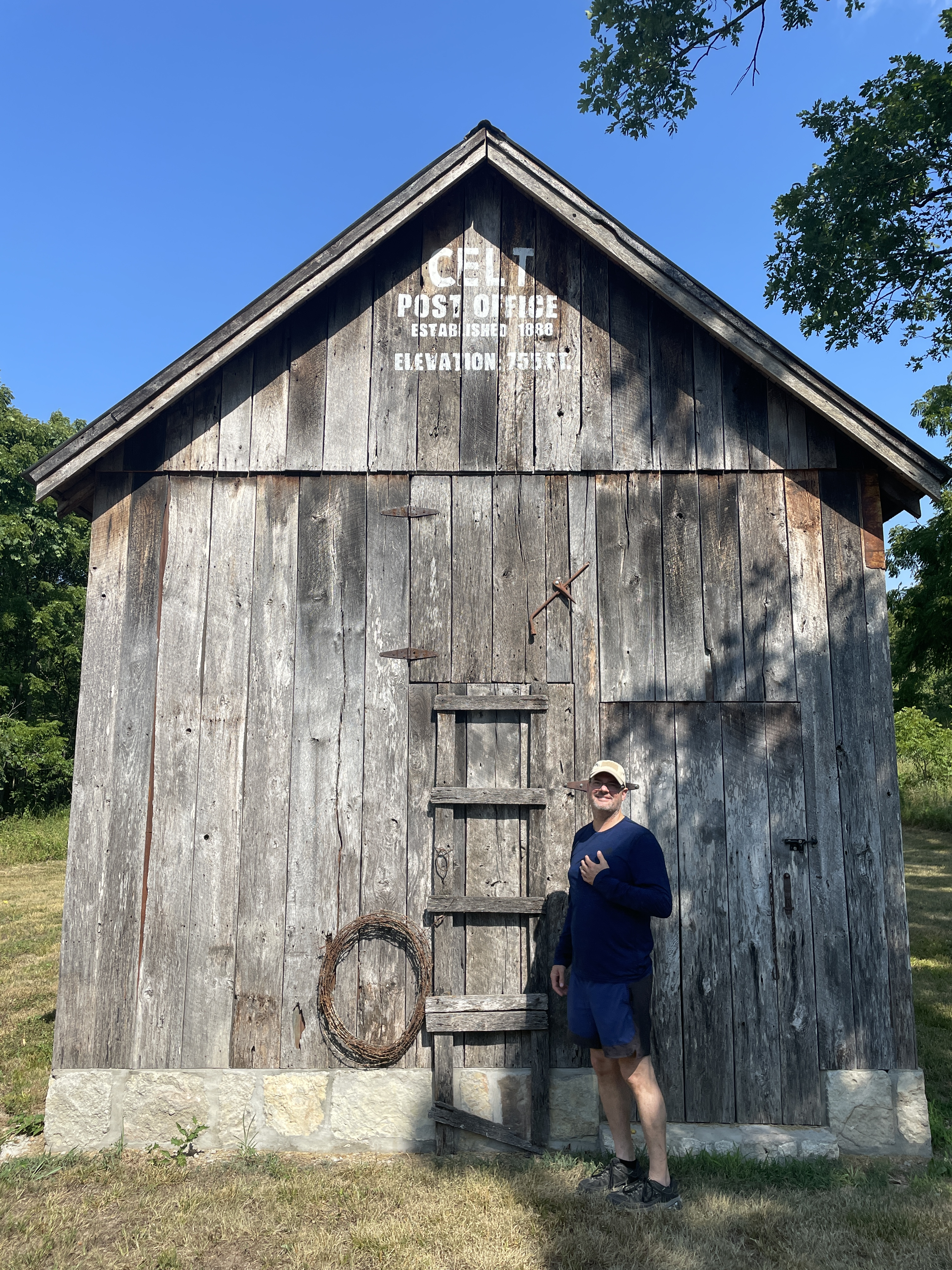
A barn and former post office in Celt, June 2023

== History ==
The settlement's name was furnished by the Postal Service when it established an office there in 1888. Celt is in a valley formed by Mill Creek. There were seven springs, called Allgire or Celt Springs, on the Mill Creek.

In 1904, a new telegraph office was established here.

The post office closed in 1968.

The now-abandoned Celt School was located in the settlement in the early 1940s.
