= Wood Hill, Missouri =

Unincorporated community in Missouri, U.S.

Coordinates: 37°44′38″N 93°02′20″W

Wood Hill is an unincorporated community in Dallas County, in the U.S. state of Missouri. The community is located on Missouri Route 64, approximately 1.5 miles east of Pumpkin Center and Missouri Route 73. Buffalo is seven miles south-southwest. The headwaters of the Little Niangua River arise just east of the location.

== History ==
A post office called Woodhill was established in 1872, and remained in operation until 1906. The community was named for the nearby landscape.
