= Elixer, Missouri =

Unincorporated community in Missouri, U.S.

Coordinates: 37°53′31″N 93°07′07″W

Elixer is an unincorporated community in Dallas County, in the U.S. state of Missouri.

== History ==
A post office called Elixer was established in 1882, and remained in operation until 1906. The community took its name from nearby Elixir Spring.
