= List of metropolitan areas of Missouri =

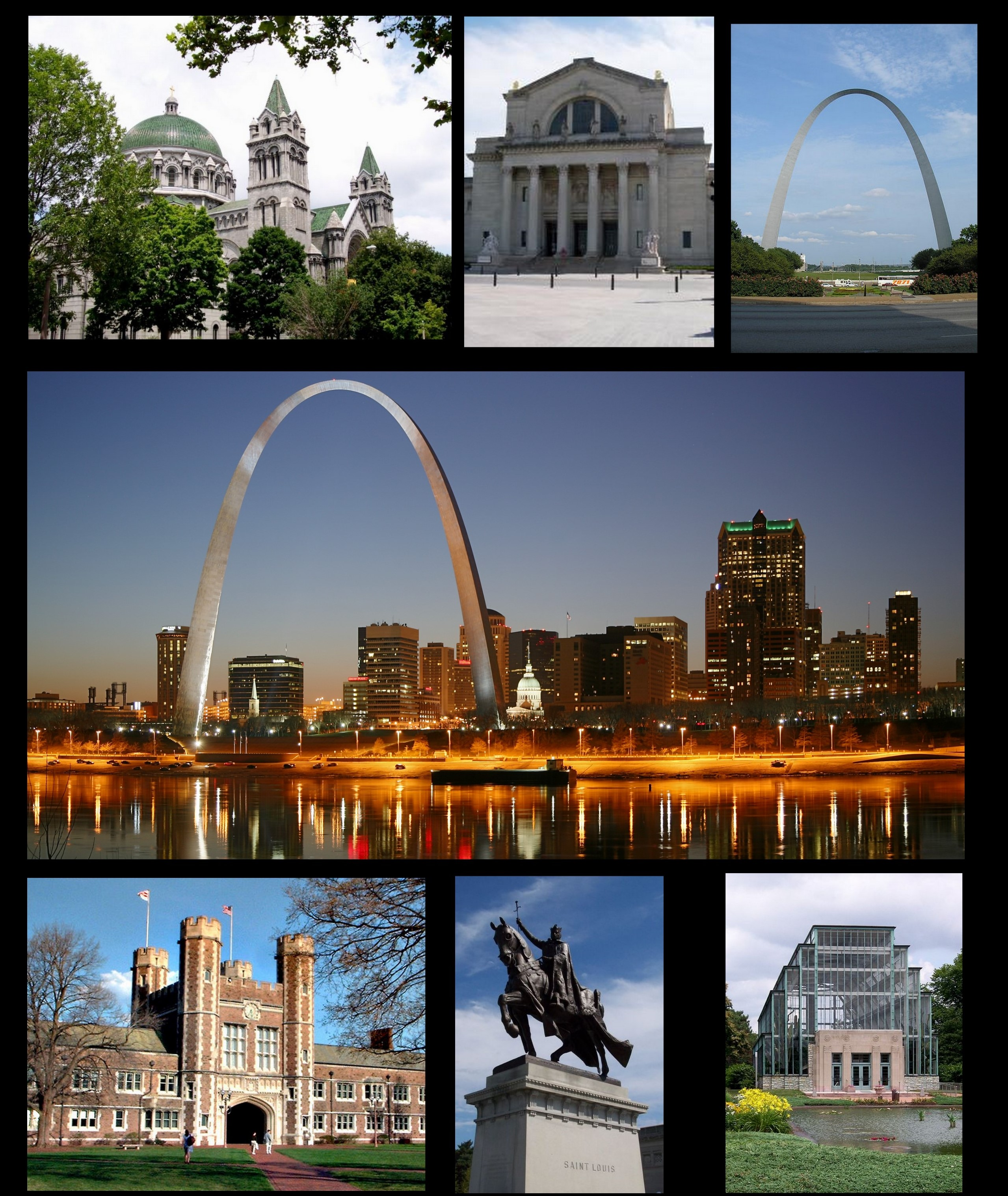
St. Louis, largest metropolitan area

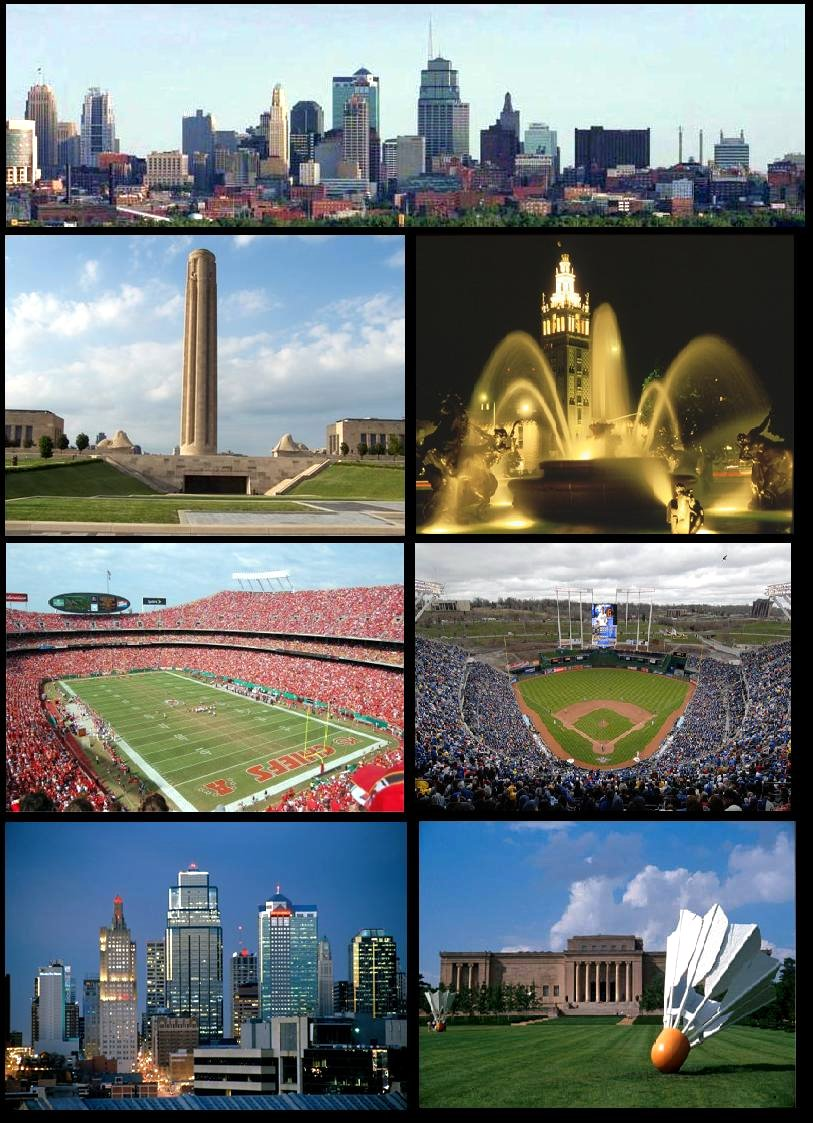
Kansas City, second largest metropolitan area

Following are the metropolitan or metropolitan statistical areas of Missouri with population statistics:

Rank	Metropolitan Area	Population 2017
1	St. Louis	2,817,355
2	Kansas City	2,056,676
3	Springfield	462,369
4	Columbia	206,054
5	Joplin	176,849
6	Jefferson City	150,480
7	St. Joseph	127,574
8	Cape Girardeau	97,024

== See also ==
- Missouri statistical areas
