= Hugh Alexander (baseball) =

American baseball player and scout (1917–2000)

- Outfielder
- Born: July 10, 1917; Buffalo, Missouri, U.S.
- Died: November 25, 2000 (aged 83); Bethany, Oklahoma, U.S.
- Batted: Right Threw: Right

MLB debut
- August 15, 1937, for the Cleveland Indians

Last MLB appearance
- September 22, 1937, for the Cleveland Indians

MLB statistics
- Batting average: .091
- Hits: 1
- Stats at Baseball Reference

Teams
- Cleveland Indians (1937)

Hugh Alexander (July 10, 1917 – November 25, 2000) was an American professional baseball player and scout. He was an outfielder during his brief playing career, but after he suffered a career-ending injury at the age of 20 he became one of baseball's most celebrated scouts.

Born in Buffalo, Missouri, Alexander moved to Oklahoma with his family at the age of five. Alexander the player stood 6 feet (1.8 m) tall, weighed 190 pounds (86 kg), and batted and threw right-handed. He spent 1936 and 1937 in the lower levels of the Cleveland Indians' farm system, and batted .348 and .344 in successive seasons. Called to the Majors, he appeared in seven games for the 1937 Indians in August, getting one hit in eleven at bats (.091) and striking out five times. He returned to the Indians for a single game in September as a pinch runner. That offseason, while working his family's oil fields in Oklahoma, he lost his left hand in a drilling accident, ending his playing career. Alexander then began a very short career as a bartender.

In the aftermath of the accident, Alexander was immediately named a scout for the Indians; at 20, he was unusually young for the assignment and scouting jobs were at a premium during the height of The Great Depression. But the first two players he signed for Cleveland became big-league All-Stars — pitcher Allie Reynolds and outfielder Dale Mitchell. Sportswriter Allen Barra praised him as a "superb judge of talent." During a 64-year scouting career, working for the Indians, Chicago White Sox, Brooklyn/Los Angeles Dodgers, Philadelphia Phillies and Chicago Cubs, Alexander earned the nickname "Uncle Hughie" and would sign other stars, including Steve Garvey, Frank Howard, Davey Lopes, Bill Russell and Don Sutton for the Dodgers alone.

In 1984 Alexander co-founded the "Scout of the Year Program", which recognised the best scouts in the country each year. Alexander was awarded "Scout of the Year" in 1996. He retired in 1998, and died on November 25, 2000.
