= Cloverdale, Missouri =

Unincorporated community in Missouri, U.S.

Coordinates: 37°38′05″N 93°01′36″W

Cloverdale is an unincorporated community in Dallas County, in the U.S. state of Missouri.

== History ==
A post office called Cloverdale was established in 1896, and remained in operation until 1911. The name Cloverdale is descriptive.
