= Springfield metropolitan area, Missouri =

- Metropolitan Statistical Area
- Springfield, Missouri Metropolitan Statistical Area
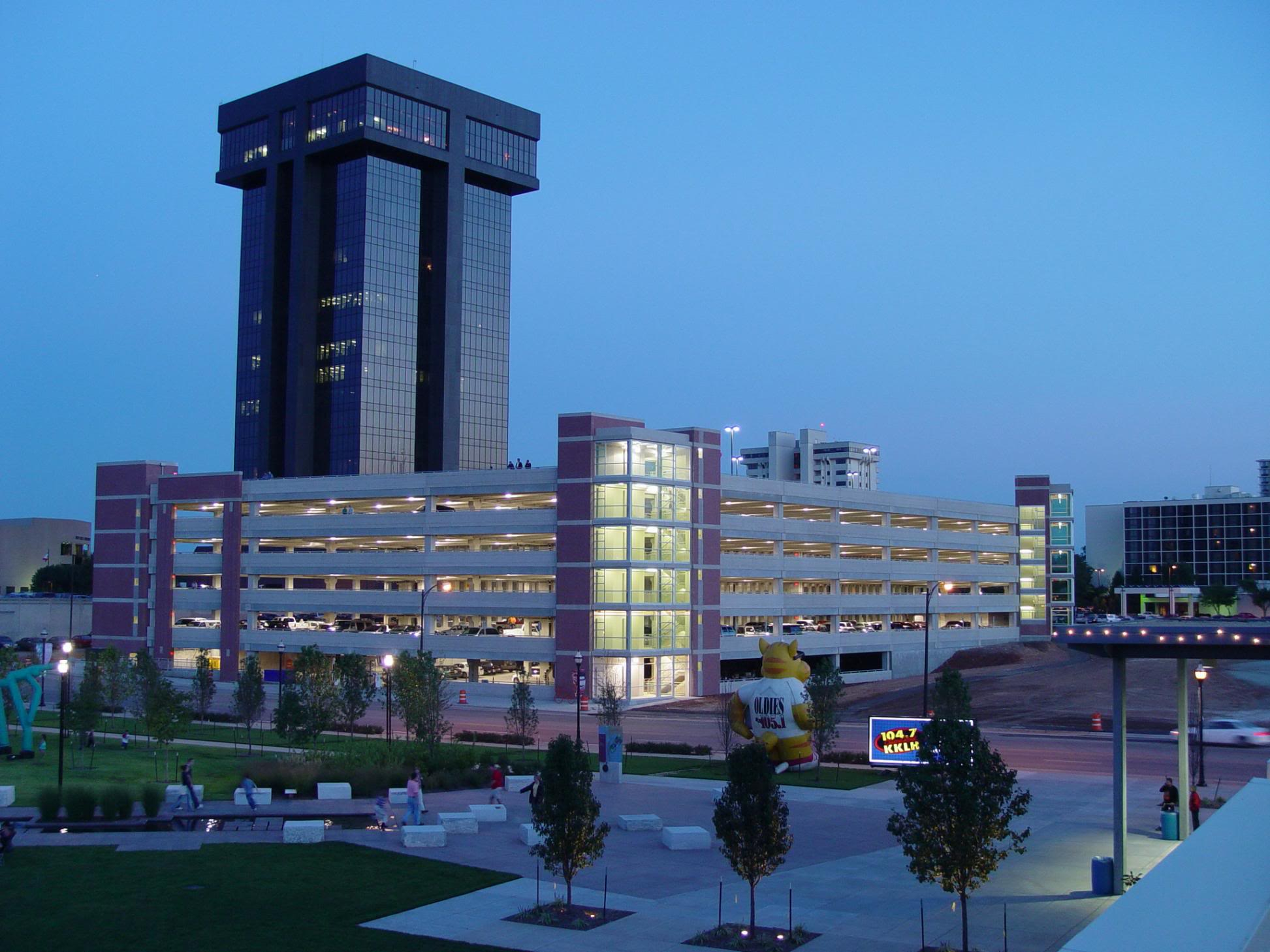
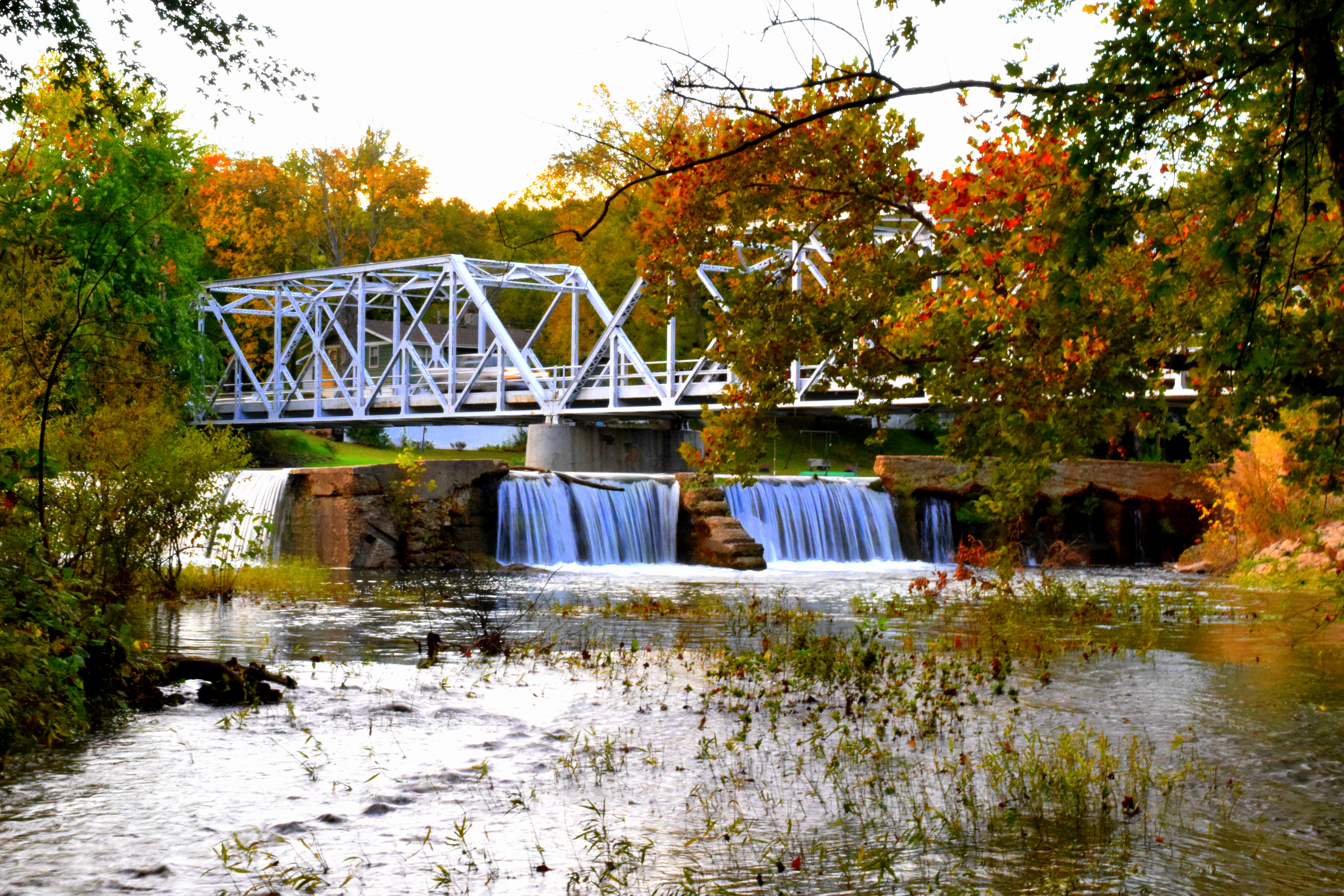
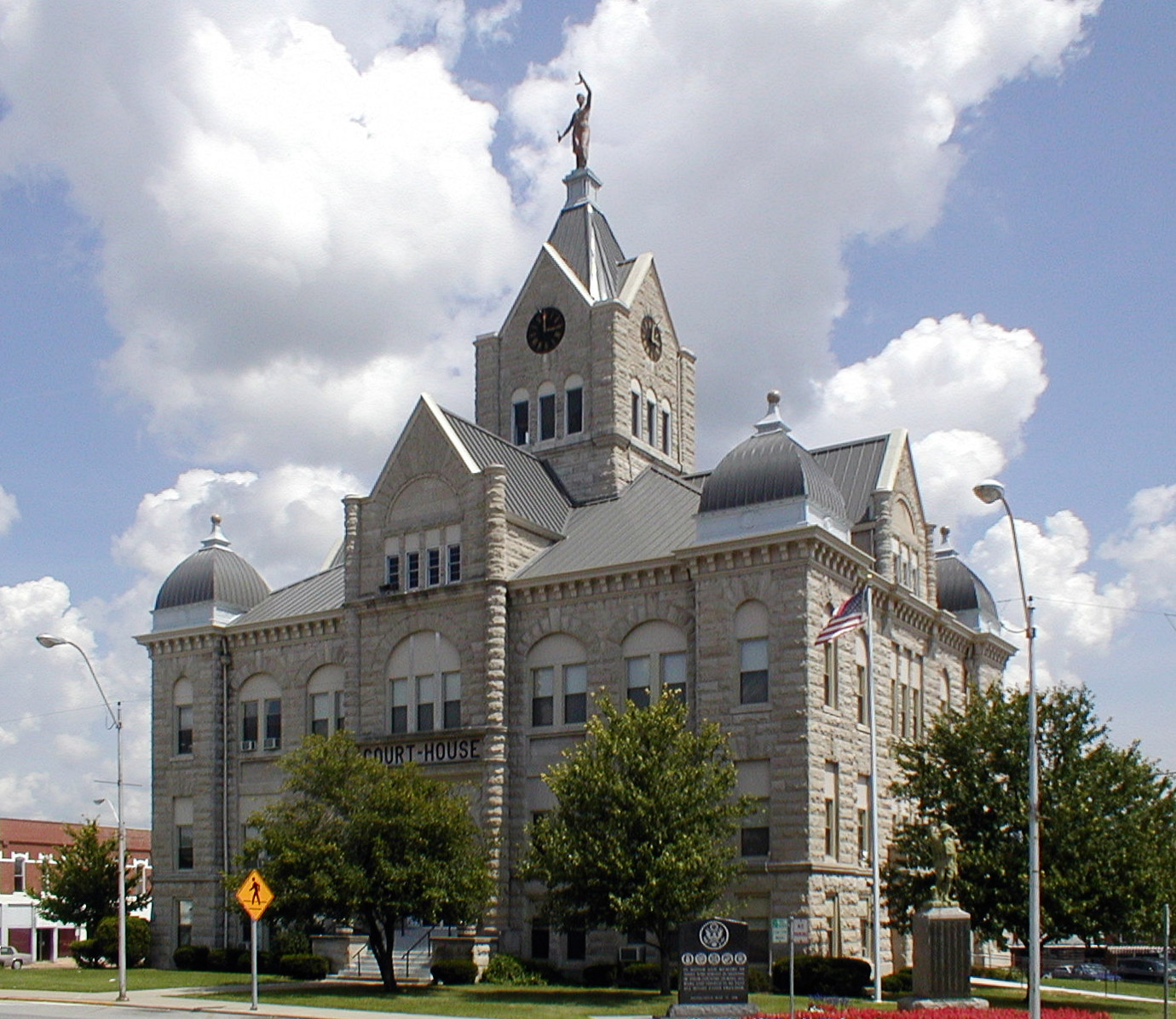
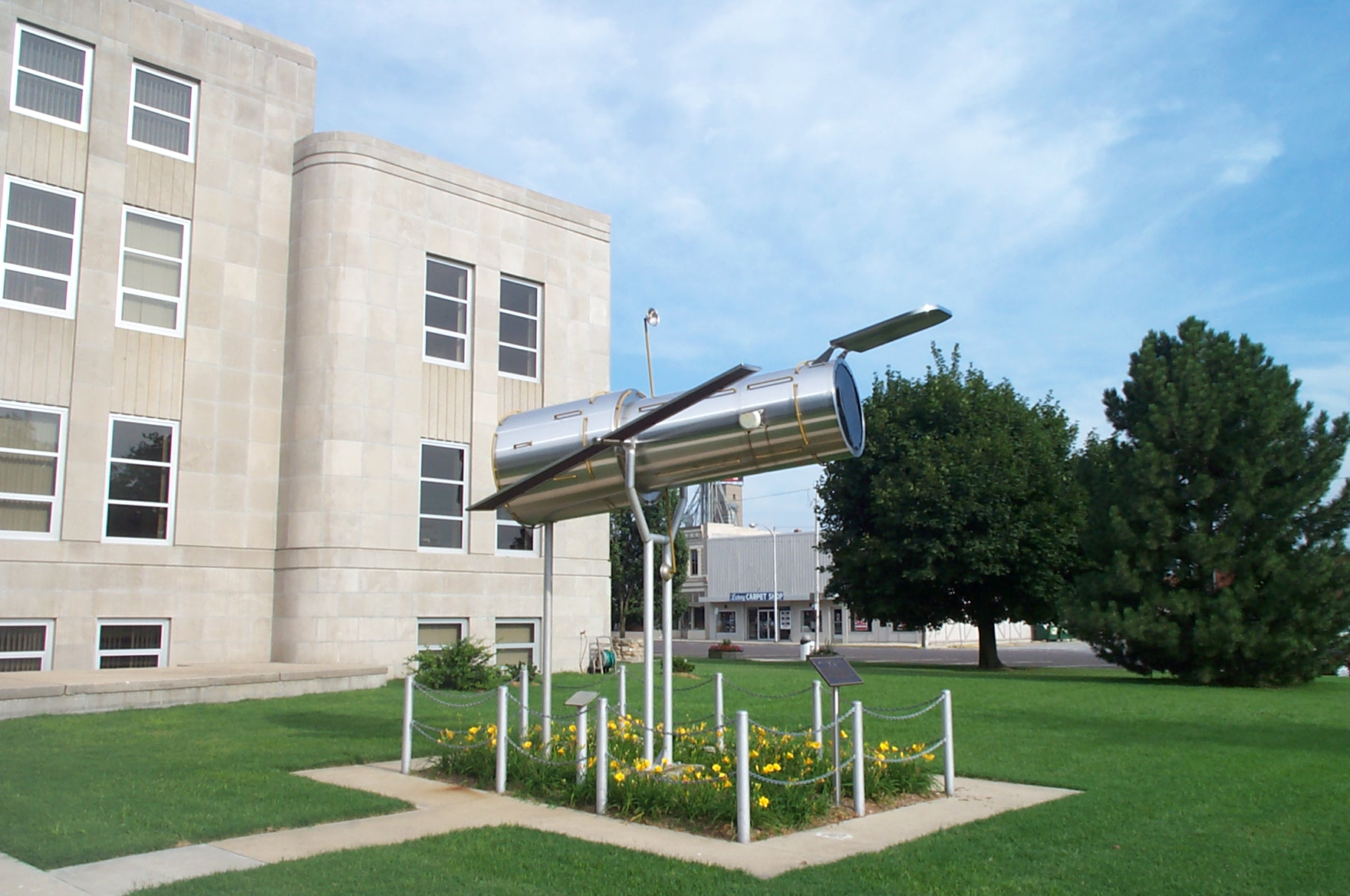
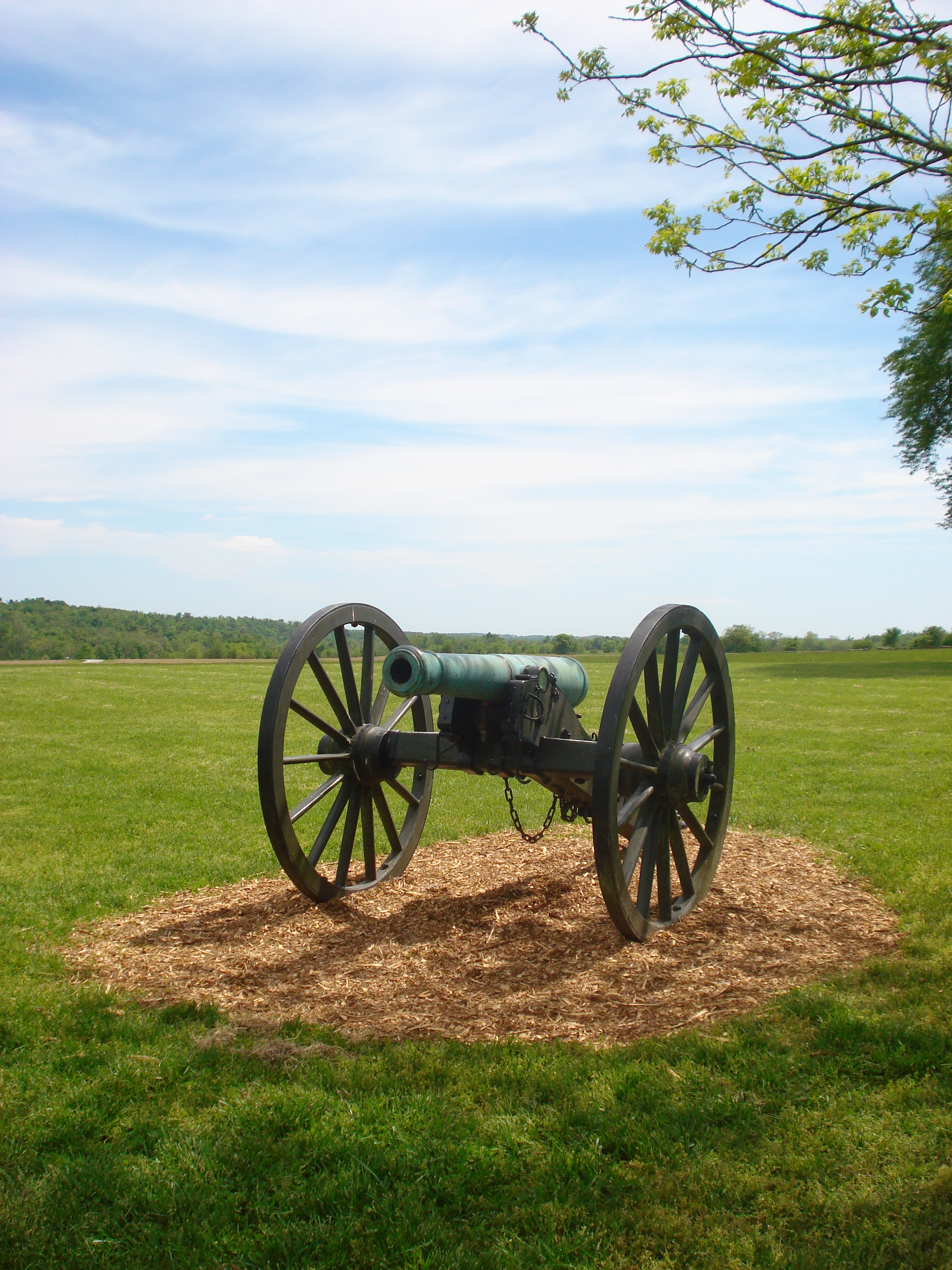
- Springfield Ozark Bolivar Marshfield Wilson's Creek National Battlefield
Interactive Map of Springfield, MO MSA
City of Springfield
Springfield, MO MSA
- Coordinates: 37°21′42″N 93°10′37″W
- Country: United States
- State: Missouri
- Principal city: Springfield
- Other cities: Battlefield; Nixa; Ozark; Republic; Marshfield; Bolivar; Willard

Area
  - Total: 3,021 sq mi (7,820 km^{2})

Population (2020 census)
  - Total: 475,432
  - Rank: 117th in the U.S.

GDP
  - Total: $26.687 billion (2022)
- Time zone: UTC−7 (CST)
  - Summer (DST): UTC−6 (CDT)

Historical population
Census	Pop.	Note	%±
1960	126,274		—
1970	152,929		21.1%
1980	207,704		35.8%
1990	240,593		15.8%
2000	368,374		53.1%
2010	436,712		18.6%
2020	475,432		8.9%
2025 (est.)	500,694		5.3%

The Springfield, Missouri, metropolitan area, as defined by the United States Census Bureau, is an area consisting of five counties in southwestern Missouri, anchored by the city of Springfield, the state's third largest city. Other primary population centers in the metro area include Nixa, Ozark, Republic, Bolivar, Marshfield and Willard. Currently, the city limits of Springfield reach the Nixa, and Ozark city limits at the Christian County line on US 160, and US 65 respectively, the city limits of Republic at James River Freeway on the southwest side of the city, and the Strafford city limits on Route 744 on the northeast side of the city. A small of portion of Taney County is included with the village of Saddlebrooke.

As of the 2020 census, the MSA (Metropolitan Statistical Area) had a population of 475,432 and was the fastest growing metro area in the state of Missouri. The area is home to several centers for higher education, including Missouri State University, Drury University and Southwest Baptist University. The Springfield region serves as the headquarters for various companies and organizations, including Bass Pro Shops, BKD, LLP, O'Reilly Auto Parts, Jack Henry & Associates, Andy's Frozen Custard and CoxHealth, and also serves as an important location for JPMorgan Chase, Expedia and American Airlines. As of 2019, the Springfield metro had a GDP of US$20.8 billion, the third largest in Missouri.

== Counties ==
County	Seat	2025 estimate	2020 Census	Change	Area	Density
Greene	Springfield	309,286	298,915	+3.47%	678 sq mi (1,760 km^{2})	456/sq mi (176/km^{2})
Christian	Ozark	96,725	88,842	+8.87%	564 sq mi (1,460 km^{2})	171/sq mi (66/km^{2})
Webster	Marshfield	43,054	39,085	+10.15%	594 sq mi (1,540 km^{2})	72/sq mi (28/km^{2})
Polk	Bolivar	33,604	31,519	+6.62%	642 sq mi (1,660 km^{2})	52/sq mi (20/km^{2})
Dallas	Buffalo	18,025	17,071	+5.59%	543 sq mi (1,410 km^{2})	33/sq mi (13/km^{2})
Total		500,694	475,432	+5.31%	3,021 sq mi (7,820 km^{2})	166/sq mi (64/km^{2})

== Communities ==
=== Anchor cities ===
- Springfield Pop: 169,176

=== Places with more than 5,000 inhabitants ===
- Nixa Pop: 23,257
- Ozark Pop: 21,284
- Republic Pop: 18,750
- Bolivar Pop: 10,679
- Marshfield Pop: 7,458
- Willard Pop: 6,344
- Battlefield Pop: 5,990

=== Places with 1,000 to 5,000 inhabitants ===
- Rogersville Pop: 3,374
- Buffalo Pop: 3,290
- Clever Pop: 2,918
- Strafford Pop: 2,561
- Seymour Pop: 1,841
- Sparta Pop: 1,867
- Fair Grove Pop: 1,582
- Ash Grove Pop: 1,512
- Billings Pop: 1,084
- Fremont Hills Pop: 1,049

=== Places with 500 to 1,000 inhabitants ===
- Humansville Pop: 965
- Highlandville Pop: 963
- Fremont Hills Pop: 847
- Fordland Pop: 778
- Pleasant Hope Pop: 657
- Walnut Grove Pop: 652

=== Places with less than 500 inhabitants ===
- Spokane Pop: 491
- Fair Play Pop: 422
- Niangua Pop: 390
- Urbana Pop: 387
- Morrisville Pop: 376
- Saddlebrooke Pop: 309
- Diggins Pop: 305
- Halfway Pop: 151
- Louisburg Pop: 134
- Flemington Pop: 110
- Aldrich Pop: 76
- Goodnight Pop: 18

=== Unincorporated places ===
- Boaz
- Bois D'Arc
- Brighton
- Bruner
- Celt
- Chadwick
- Charity
- Chestnutridge
- Dunnegan
- Ebenezer
- Elkhead
- Elkland
- Eudora
- Garrison
- Glidewell
- Goodson
- Keltner
- Linden
- Logan
- Long Lane
- Northview
- Oak Grove Heights
- Oldfield
- Plano
- Polk
- Red Top
- Red Top
- Tin Town
- Tunas
- Turners
- Windyville
- Bradleyville
- Brownbranch
- Cape Fair
- Carr Lane
- Cedar Creek
- Crossroads
- Elsey
- Hilda
- Lampe
- McClurg
- Point Lookout
- Ponce de Leon
- Powersite
- Protem
- Reeds Spring Junction
- Ridgedale
- Rueter
- Table Rock
- Union City
- Viola (partial)
- Walnut Shade

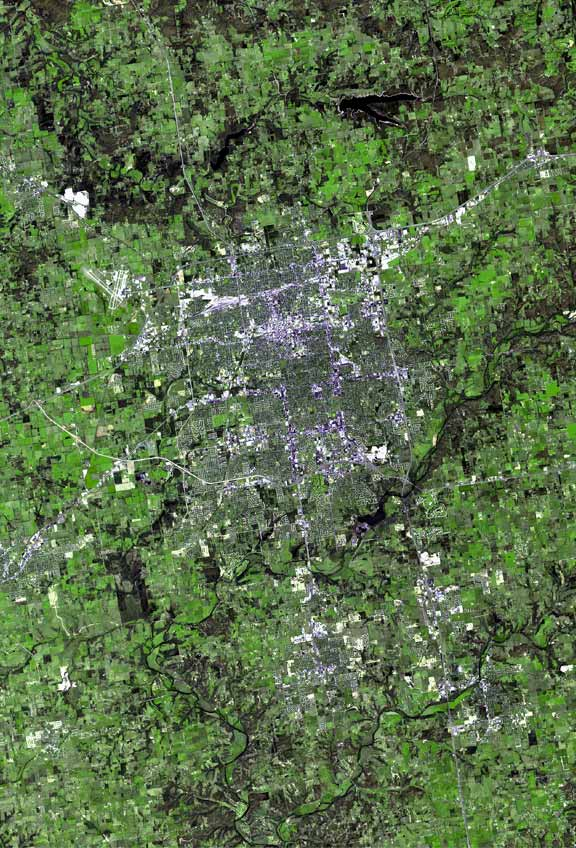
Satellite view of Springfield

== School systems ==
- Ash Grove R-IV School District
- Billings R-IV School District
- Bolivar R-1 School District
- Chadwick School District
- Clever R-V School District
- Dallas Co. R-1 School District
- Fair Grove R-X School District
- Fordland R-III School District
- Greenwood Laboratory School
- Hickory County R-1 School District
- Logan-Rogersville R-VIII School District
- Marion C Early R-V (Morrisville) School District
- Marshfield R-I School District
- Niangua R-V School District
- Nixa R-II School District
- Ozark R-VI School District
- Pleasant Hope R-VI School District
- Republic R-III School District
- Seymour R-II School District
- Spokane R-VII School District
- Springfield Catholic Schools
- Springfield R-12 School District
- Strafford R-VI School District
- Walnut Grove R-V School District
- Willard R-2 School District

== Economy ==
Springfield is the headquarters for O'Reilly Auto Parts, the only Fortune 500 company based in the region. It also houses the headquarters for Bass Pro Shops, CoxHealth, Andy's Frozen Custard, BKD, LLP and Jack Henry & Associates. The Springfield–Branson National Airport serves as a base for American Airlines and Envoy Air as the airline utilizes the airport as a maintenance base. Springfield is also an important region for call centers, with Expedia, Chase and AT&T maintaining call centers in the city.

== Media ==
Springfield serves as the center of the Springfield media market, the 75th largest media market in the country ranked amongst Omaha, Nebraska and Rochester, New York. There are nearly 430,000 television owning homes and a total population of 1,065,000 people.

=== Print ===
The main newspaper for the area is the Springfield News-Leader. The area is also served by the Springfield Business Journal and 417 magazine as well as its specialized magazines including 417 Biz.

Surrounding areas are served by their own newspapers as well, Christian County communities are served by Headliner News, Marshfield by The Marshfield Mail, and Bolivar by the Herald Free-Press.

=== Broadcast ===
Television stations in the Springfield metro area include:

- KYTV channel 3, NBC
- KOLR channel 10, CBS
- KYCW channel 15, The CW
- KOZK channel 21, PBS
- KOZL channel 27, MyNetworkTV
- KSPR channel 33, ABC
- KRBK channel 49, Fox

== Education ==
=== Secondary ===
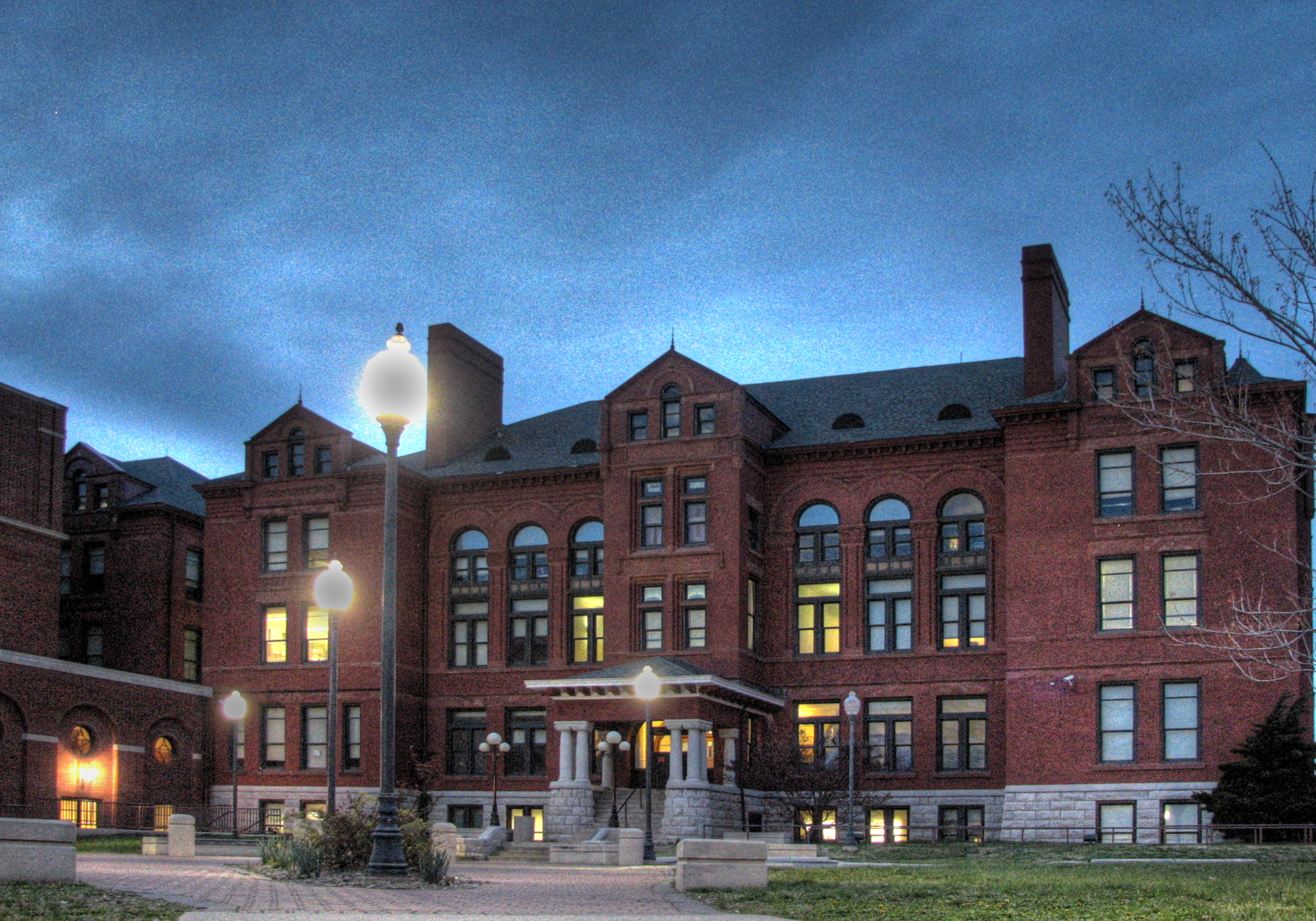
Central High School in Springfield

Springfield Public Schools is the largest fully accredited school district in the State of Missouri with nearly 25,000 students and a graduation rate of roughly 88%. Nixa Public Schools, located just south of Springfield, is a growing district of 6,000 students that frequently ranks above the national average in ACT scores and has for the last ten years earned the highest state recognition for academic achievement given in Missouri. Other growing districts in the area are located in the cities of Ozark, Republic, Strafford, and Marshfield. Private schools in the area include the Greenwood Laboratory School in Springfield, located on the Missouri State campus, and the Summit Preparatory School, located near James River Freeway in Chesterfield Village.

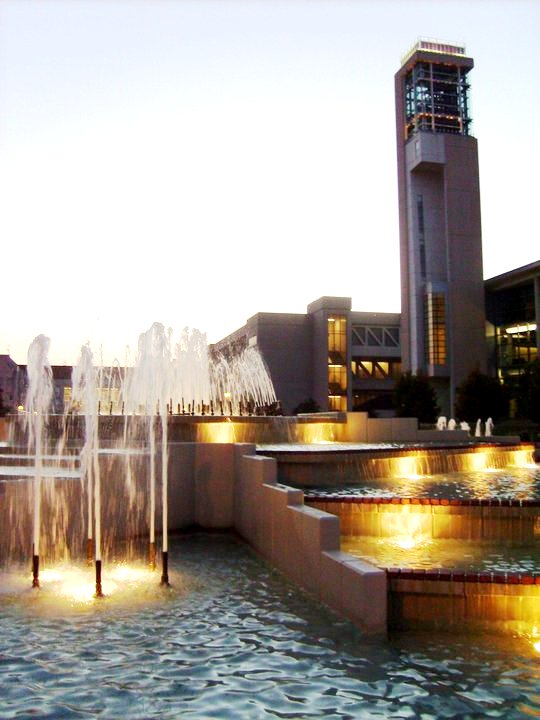
Meyer Library at Missouri State University Campus

There are also several private religious schools in the area, including Springfield Catholic and Springfield Lutheran.

=== Colleges and universities ===
Missouri State University in Springfield is the second largest university in the state with roughly 23,697 in 2019. Other universities in Springfield include Drury University, a private liberal arts college with more than 1,000 students, OTC with approximately 11,000 students, where students can earn a one-year certificate or a two-year associate degree, and Evangel University, a private Christian liberal arts university with more than 2,500 students.

== Transportation ==
=== Principal Highways ===
- I-44 – East to St. Louis and west to Tulsa
- US 60 – East to Louisville and west to Monett
- US 65 – South to Little Rock and north to Des Moines
- US 160 – West to Wichita
- Route 13 – North to Kansas City
- Route 14 – Between Nixa and Ozark
- Route 125 – Between Strafford and Rogersville

=== Air ===
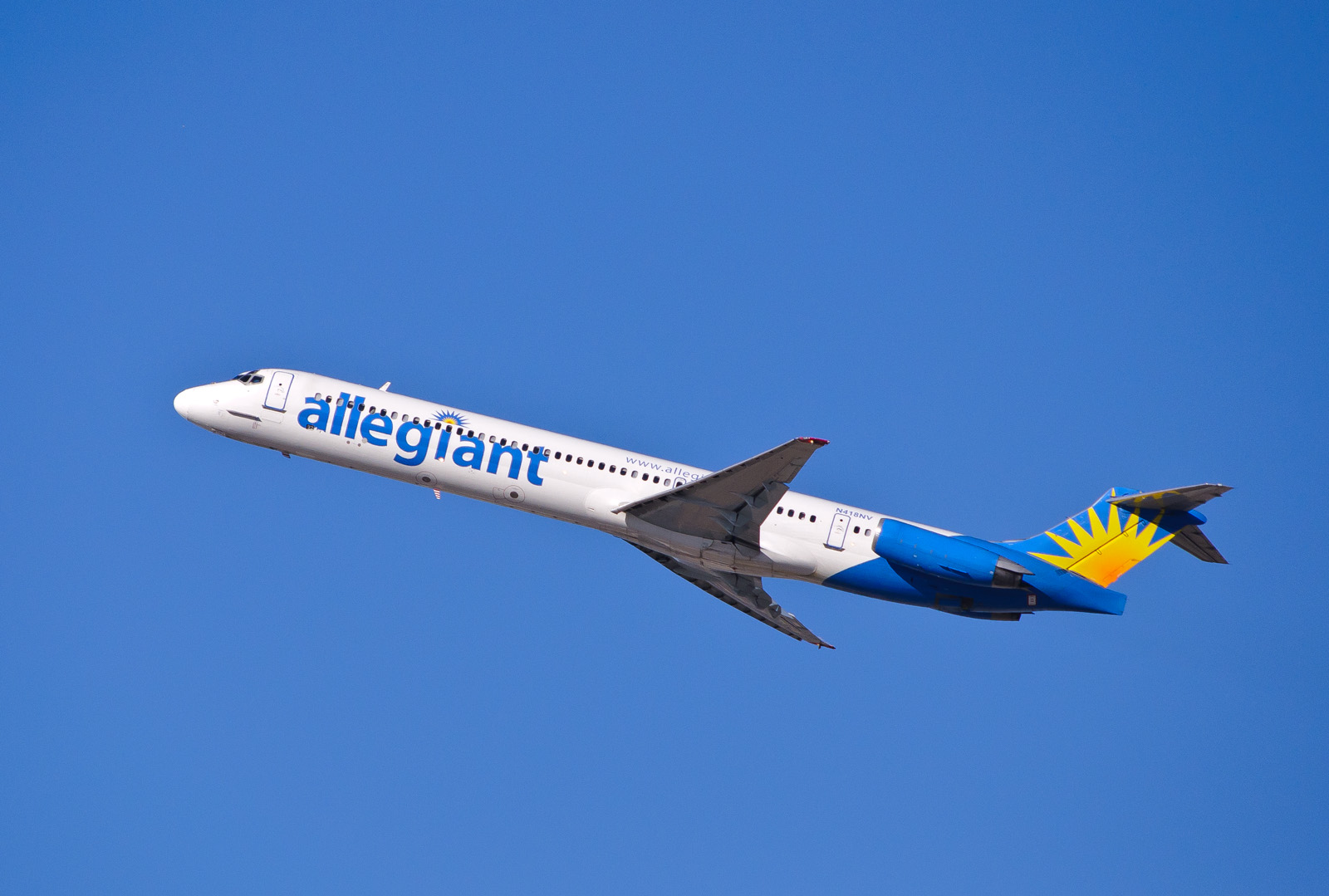
Allegiant Air flight departing from Springfield

The area is served by Springfield-Branson National Airport which has direct flights on Delta, United, American and Allegiant to thirteen cities across the United States, including hubs such as Chicago, Dallas, Atlanta, Charlotte and Houston, among others. With over one million passengers per year prior to the COVID-19 pandemic, it is one of the fastest growing airports of its size in the country. A new terminal was opened at the airport in 2007 with 10 gates, expandable to 60, and runways can accommodate the Boeing 747 and large military aircraft.

Springfield has a secondary, smaller airport, Downtown Airport which is not served by any passenger airlines and is used mostly by smaller general aviation airplanes.

=== Public transportation ===
Public transportation in the metropolitan area is focused primarily in Springfield. City Utilities of Springfield operates Springfield Transit Services, operating many buses on several different routes throughout the city, and bus service is available 365 days per year with less frequent weekend, holiday and evening routes.

=== Greenways ===
The area has a growing number of Greenway trails, 70 miles (112 km) run through parks and green areas, while 81 miles (130 km) are located on city streets. Such routes include The Link, which runs on local roads through the city of Springfield, and the Trail of Tears Link, while the Frisco Link connects Springfield with Bolivar to the north.

== See also ==
- List of metropolitan areas of Missouri
