= Buffalo Municipal Airport (Missouri) =

- IATA: none; ICAO: none; FAA LID: H17

Summary
- Airport type: Public
- Owner: City of Buffalo
- Serves: Buffalo, Missouri
- Elevation AMSL: 1,154 ft (352 m)
- Coordinates: 37°39′15″N 093°05′13″W
- Interactive map of Buffalo Municipal Airport

Runways
Direction	Length		Surface
Direction	ft	m	Surface
3/21	3,220	981	Asphalt

Helipads
Number	Length		Surface
Number	ft	m	Surface
H1	40	12	Asphalt

Statistics (2009)
- Aircraft operations: 1,650
- Based aircraft: 7
- Source: Federal Aviation Administration

Buffalo Municipal Airport (FAA LID: H17) is a city-owned public-use airport located one nautical mile (1.15 mi (1.85 km)) north of the central business district of Buffalo, a city in Dallas County, Missouri, United States.

== Facilities and aircraft ==
Buffalo Municipal Airport covers an area of 67 acres (27 ha) at an elevation of 1,154 feet (352 m) above mean sea level. It has one runway designated 3/21 with a 3,220 by 50 ft (981 by 15 m) with an asphalt surface and one helipad with a 40 by 40 feet (12 by 12 metres) with an asphalt surface.

For the 12-month period ending June 30, 2009, the airport had 1,650 aircraft operations, an average of 137 per month: 98.5% general aviation and 1.5% military. At that time there were 7 aircraft based at this airport: 86% single-engine and 14% multi-engine.

== See also ==
- List of airports in Missouri
