= Ha Ha Tonka State Park =

State park in Missouri

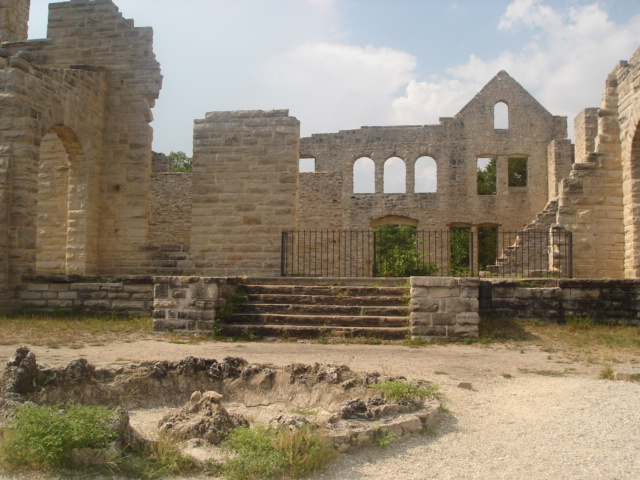
- "Castle" ruins at Ha Ha Tonka

- Location within Missouri Location within the United States
- Location: Camden County, Missouri, United States
- Coordinates: 37°58′27″N 92°45′47″W
- Area: 3,751.74 acres (1,518.28 ha)
- Elevation: 804 ft (245 m)
- Established: 1978
- Administrator: Missouri Department of Natural Resources
- Visitors: 543,406 (in 2022)
- Website: Official website

Ha Ha Tonka State Park is a public recreation area encompassing 3,751 acres (1,518 ha) on the Niangua arm of the Lake of the Ozarks, about five miles south of Camdenton, Missouri. The state park's most notable feature is the ruins of Ha Ha Tonka, an early 20th-century stone mansion that was modeled after European castles of the 16th century.

The park also features caves, sinkholes, and bluffs overlooking the lake. It is a prominent example of karst topography, which is a geological formation shaped by the dissolution of layers of soluble bedrock. A 70-acre (28 ha) portion of the park was designated as the Ha Ha Tonka Karst Natural Area in 1981.

== History ==
Robert McClure Snyder Sr. began construction of the Ha Ha Tonka castle in 1905. He was a Kansas City businessman who purchased the large property after visiting there in 1903. "Ha ha tonka" was said to mean "big laugh" or "smiling waters", alluding to the natural springs on the property.

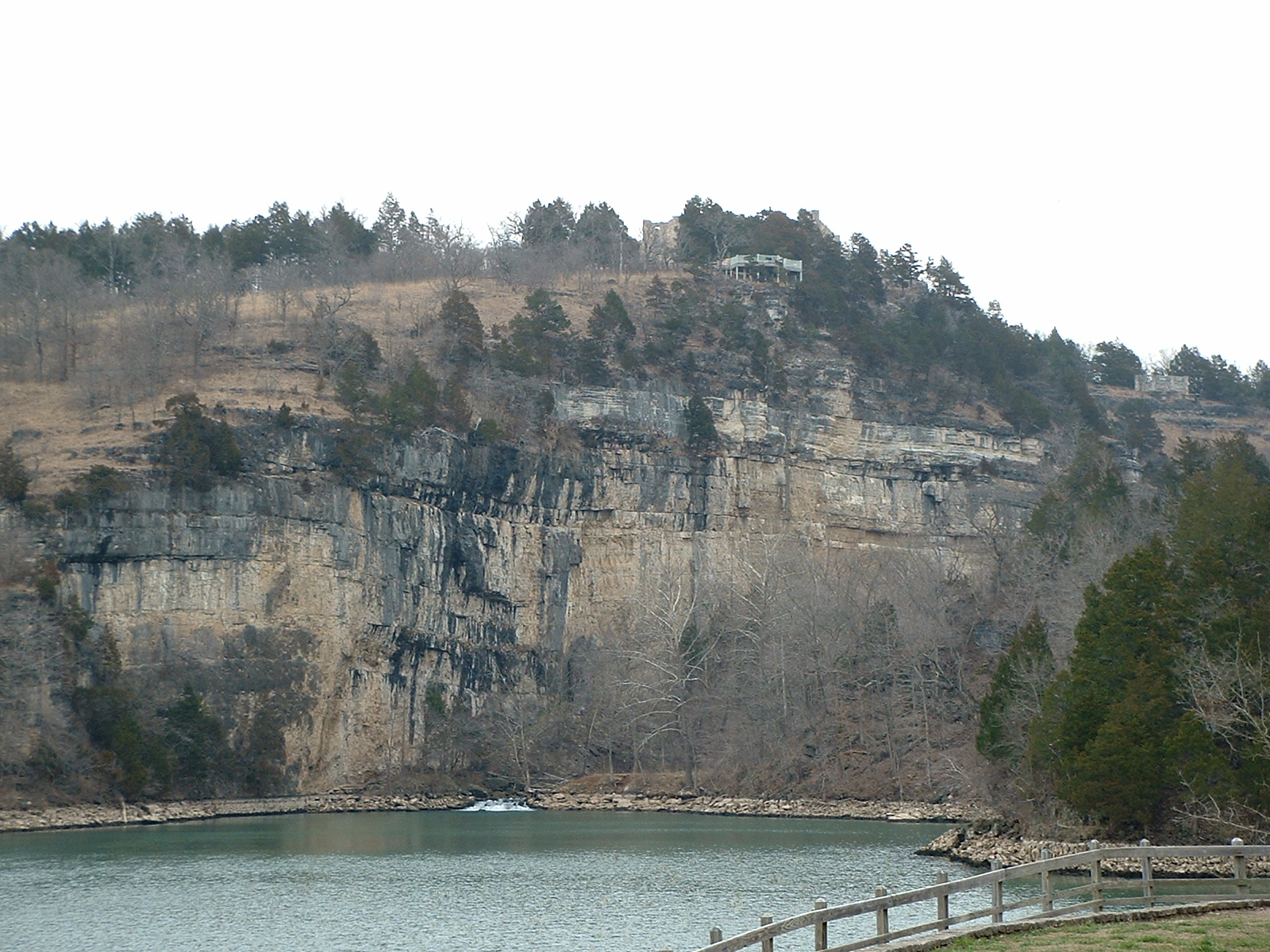
Looking up at the Ha Ha Tonka ruins

Snyder died in a car accident in 1906, and the castle was completed by his sons Robert Jr., LeRoy, and Kenneth Snyder in the early 1920s before the Stock Market Crash. The Snyder family lived in Kansas City, and they used the building as a summer and weekend home. In the late 1930s, it was used as a hotel; however, it was destroyed by fire in 1942.

The state purchased the castle and grounds in 1978, adapting them for use as a state park and opening them to the public. The water tower was repaired in 2004, with a new roof installed. The castle walls were stabilized in the 1980s, but a survey in 2016 determined that portions of the ruins were seeing mortar and stone failure, with the growing potential of collapse. Some areas have been closed off from the public. The ruins can be seen from an observation point across from the park office.

== Activities and amenities ==
The park has 15 miles of hiking trails leading to caves, sinkholes, natural bridges, and the castle. The park also features boating, fishing, and swimming.

Park trails
Trail Name	Description	Length	Notes
Acorn Trail	Moderate hiking trail	0.9 miles	
Big Niangua River Trail	Rough trail made for paddling	13.4 miles	
Boulder Ridge Trail	Moderate hiking trail	1.5 miles	
Castle Trail	Easy trail	0.4 miles	Disability
Cedar Trail	Moderate hiking trail	0.2 miles	
Colosseum Trail	Rugged hiking trail	0.6 miles	
Dell Rim Trail	Moderate hiking trail	0.3 miles	Disability
Devil's Kitchen Trail	Rugged hiking trail	1.3 miles	
Island Trail	Rugged hiking trail	0.4 miles	
Oak Woodland Interpretive Trail	Easy hiking trail	0.1 miles	Disability
Quarry Trail	Moderate hiking trail	1.7 miles	
Spring Trail	Moderate hiking trail	1.4 miles	Disability
Turkey Pen Hollow Trail	Rugged hiking trail	6.5 miles	

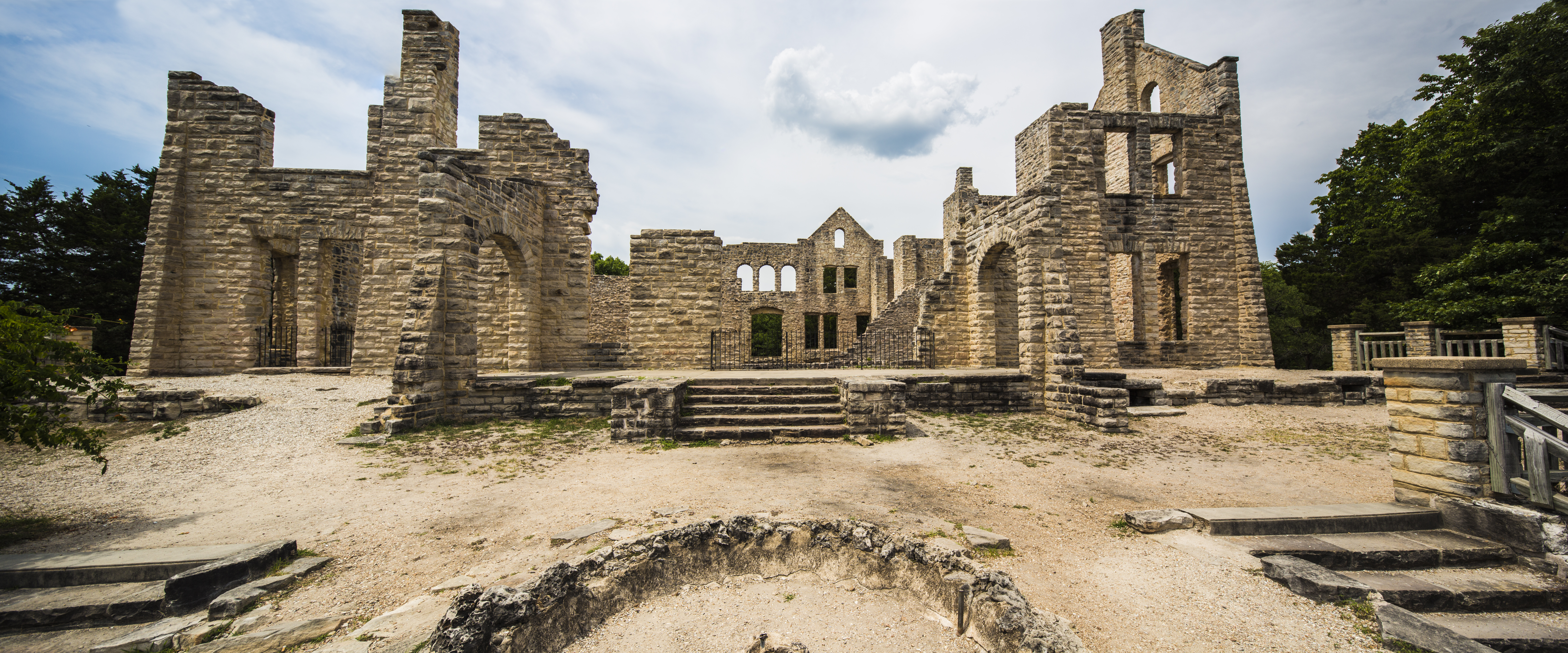
American Castle Panoramic
