= Tunas, Missouri =

Unincorporated hamlet in Missouri, U.S.

Coordinates: 37°50′59″N 93°01′40″W

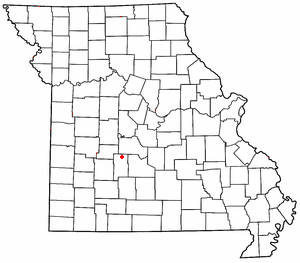

Tunas is an unincorporated community in northern Dallas County, Missouri, United States. It lies fourteen miles north of Buffalo on Route 73 and approximately seven miles east of Urbana on Route D. The town is located on Route 73, just southwest of the Little Niangua River. Tunas is part of the Springfield, Missouri Metropolitan Statistical Area.

A post office at Tunas has been in operation since 1893. The etymology of the name Tunas is obscure. The ZIP Code for Tunas is 65764.
