= Leadmine, Missouri =

Unincorporated community in Missouri, US

Coordinates: 37°50′12″N 92°57′44″W

Leadmine (also spelled out Lead Mine) is an unincorporated community in northern Dallas County, in the U.S. state of Missouri. The community is located about 3.5 miles east of Tunas on Missouri Route E. The Lead Mines Conservation Area lies one-half mile to the east. It is approximately 50 miles north-northeast of Springfield.

== History ==
A post office called Lead Mine was established in 1877, and remained in operation until 1934. The community was named for a lead mine near the original town site. The Rambo Lead Mines were once located three miles west of the current town. Lead was discovered in 1860 by Jacob H. Rambo, who owned 40 acres where the lead was found and leased more land around it. The inimitable Jugtown Road leads east from Leadmine to the Jugtown Hollow and at one time crossed the Niangua River at Low Gap, where bridge piers remain.

== Notable person ==
Roy Meeker, a Major League Baseball pitcher, was born at Leadmine in 1900.
