= Spring Grove Cemetery (disambiguation) =

Spring Grove Cemetery is a nonprofit garden cemetery and arboretum in Cincinnati, Ohio.

Spring Grove Cemetery may also refer to:

- Spring Grove Cemetery (Hartford, Connecticut), listed on the National Register of Historic Places (NRHP) in Hartford County, Connecticut
- a pioneer cemetery in Newton Township, Buchanan County, Iowa
- Spring Grove Cemetery (Medina, Ohio), listed on the NRHP in Medina County, Ohio

== See also ==
- Spring Grove Cemetery Chapel, Cincinnati, Ohio
