= Roy Meeker =

American baseball player (1900–1929)

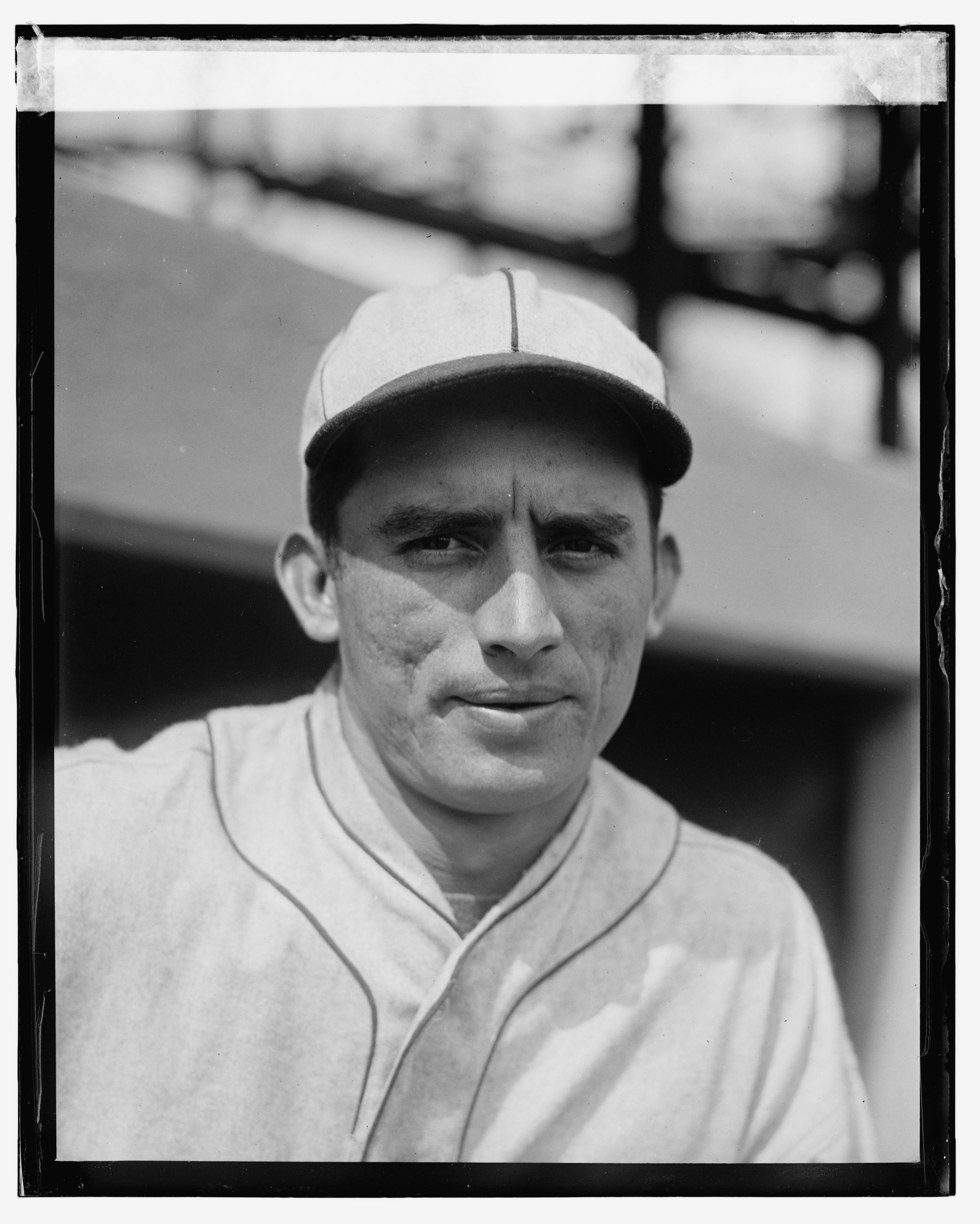
- Pitcher
- Born: September 15, 1900; Lead Mine, Missouri, U.S.
- Died: March 25, 1929 (aged 28); Orlando, Florida, U.S.
- Batted: Left Threw: Left

MLB debut
- September 22, 1923, for the Philadelphia Athletics

Last MLB appearance
- September 25, 1926, for the Cincinnati Reds

MLB statistics
- Win–loss record: 8–14
- Earned run average: 4.73
- Strikeouts: 54
- Stats at Baseball Reference

Teams
- Philadelphia Athletics (1923–1924); Cincinnati Reds (1926)

Charles Roy Meeker (September 15, 1900 – March 25, 1929) was an American professional baseball player. He was a left-handed pitcher over parts of three seasons (1923–24, 1926) with the Philadelphia Athletics and Cincinnati Reds. For his career, he compiled an 8–14 record, with a 4.73 earned run average, and 54 strikeouts in 192 innings pitched.

He was born in Lead Mine, Missouri, and at the time of his death was living in Kansas City. Meeker died of a heart attack in Orlando, Florida at the age of 28 while taking part in the Reds' spring training.
