= Missouri Route 73 =

State highway in Missouri, U.S.

Route 73

Route information
- Maintained by MoDOT
- Length: 20.034 mi (32.242 km)
- Existed: 1926–present

Major junctions
- South end: US 65 in Buffalo
- North end: US 54 near Macks Creek

Location
- Country: United States
- State: Missouri

Highway system
- Missouri State Highway System; Interstate; US; State; Supplemental
← Route 72	→ Route 74

Missouri Route 73 is a short state highway in southwest Missouri. It runs from an intersection with U.S. Route 65 in the northern part of Buffalo in Dallas County to U.S. Route 54 near Macks Creek in Camden County. The route is two lanes for its entire length.

== Route description ==
Route 73 begins at U.S. Route 65 in the northern tip of the town of Buffalo in Dallas County. It runs east for a short time before turning to the northeast and intersecting Route DD. The highway heads farther northeast and meets Route 64 in Pumpkin Center. North of the Route 64 intersection, the highway runs through Tunas. In Tunas, Route 73 intersects Routes D and E. Farther northeast, the route meets Route PP before crossing into Camden County.

In Camden County, Route 73 heads through the Branch Towersite and the town of Branch. It then ends at U.S. Route 54 southwest of Macks Creek.

No portion of Route 73 is a part of the National Highway System, a system of highways important to the nation's defense, economy, and mobility.

== History ==
Before the U.S. Highway system was established, Route 73 was part of Route 15. In 1926, a significant part of Route 15 became U.S. Route 54, including the section that is today Route 73. Sometime between 1932 and 1935, US 54 was realigned to the north (switching places with Route 64), rejoining its old alignment west of Macks Creek. The diagonal section cut off between Buffalo and Macks Creek became Route 73. Route 73 originally ended at Missouri Route 32 and US 65 before a connector was built north of Buffalo.

== Junction list ==
County	Location	mi	km	Destinations	Notes
Dallas	Buffalo	0.000	0.000	US 65	Southern terminus
Dallas	Buffalo	1.120	1.802	Route DD	Western terminus of Route DD
Dallas		6.167	9.925	Route 64 – Louisburg, Lebanon	
Dallas	Tunas	13.859	22.304	Route D / Route E – Urbana, Lead Mine	Western terminus of Route E; Eastern terminus of Route D
Dallas		15.775	25.387	Route PP	Eastern terminus of Route PP
Camden		20.034	32.242	US 54 – Preston, Camdenton	Northern terminus
1.000 mi = 1.609 km; 1.000 km = 0.621 mi
