= Elkhead, Missouri =

Unincorporated community in Missouri, U.S.

Coordinates: 37°00′49″N 92°55′50″W

Elkhead is an unincorporated community in eastern Christian County, Missouri, United States. It is located on Route 14, approximately sixteen miles east of Ozark. Elkhead formerly had a post office with a ZIP code 65643, but mail is now served by the post office in Sparta.

Elkhead is part of the Springfield, Missouri Metropolitan Statistical Area.

A post office called Elkhead was established in 1871, and remained in operation until 1981. The community takes its name from nearby Elkhorn Creek.
