= March, Missouri =

Unincorporated community in Missouri, U.S.

Coordinates: 37°31′21″N 93°05′22″W

March is an unincorporated community in southeast Dallas County, in the U.S. state of Missouri. The community is located at the intersection of Missouri routes 38 and F.

== History ==
A post office called March was established in 1888, and remained in operation until 1915. The community secured a post office in the month of March, hence the name.
