= Strafford, Missouri =

- City
- City of Strafford
- Location of Strafford, Missouri
- Coordinates: 37°16′12″N 93°7′19″W
- Country: United States
- State: Missouri
- County: Greene, Webster

Area
  - Total: 3.29 sq mi (8.52 km^{2})
  - Land: 3.29 sq mi (8.52 km^{2})
  - Water: 0 sq mi (0.00 km^{2})
- Elevation: 1,490 ft (454 m)

Population (2020)
  - Total: 2,561
  - Density: 778.3/sq mi (300.52/km^{2})
- Time zone: UTC-6 (Central (CST))
  - Summer (DST): UTC-5 (CDT)
- ZIP code: 65757
- Area code: 417
- FIPS code: 29-71062
- GNIS feature ID: 0727168
- Website: www.straffordmo.net

Strafford is a city in eastern Greene County, with a small portion extending into western Webster County, Missouri, United States. It is part of the Springfield, Missouri Metropolitan Statistical Area. The city's population was 2,561 at the 2020 census.

== History ==
Strafford was laid out in 1870 when the railroad was extended to that point, and named after an original owner of the site. A post office called Strafford has been in operation since 1870.

According to Ripley's Believe It or Not!, Strafford is the only town in the United States with two main streets and no back alleys. The road to the north was the main street until Route 66 was built between the backs of the businesses and the railroad. The owners simply built new entrances, giving them two front doors.

== Geography ==
According to the United States Census Bureau, the city has a total area of 2.63 square miles (6.81 km^{2}), all land. USGS Department of the Interior Original Survey 1838 and USGS Topographical Maps show the town along the White River Road that became the Telegraph Road to Saint Louis.

== Demographics ==
Historical population
| Census | Pop. | Note | %± |
|---|---|---|---|
| 1970 | 491 | | — |
| 1980 | 1,121 | | 128.3% |
| 1990 | 1,166 | | 4.0% |
| 2000 | 1,845 | | 58.2% |
| 2010 | 2,358 | | 27.8% |
| 2020 | 2,561 | | 8.6% |
U.S. Decennial Census

=== 2020 census ===
As of the 2020 census, Strafford had a population of 2,561. The median age was 34.6 years. 27.8% of residents were under the age of 18 and 14.8% of residents were 65 years of age or older. For every 100 females there were 91.8 males, and for every 100 females age 18 and over there were 89.7 males age 18 and over.

0.4% of residents lived in urban areas, while 99.6% lived in rural areas.

There were 952 households in Strafford, of which 40.8% had children under the age of 18 living in them. Of all households, 49.3% were married-couple households, 16.2% were households with a male householder and no spouse or partner present, and 24.2% were households with a female householder and no spouse or partner present. About 22.1% of all households were made up of individuals and 10.0% had someone living alone who was 65 years of age or older.

There were 1,000 housing units, of which 4.8% were vacant. The homeowner vacancy rate was 1.2% and the rental vacancy rate was 6.4%.

Racial composition as of the 2020 census
| Race | Number | Percent |
|---|---|---|
| White | 2,346 | 91.6% |
| Black or African American | 18 | 0.7% |
| American Indian and Alaska Native | 14 | 0.5% |
| Asian | 7 | 0.3% |
| Native Hawaiian and Other Pacific Islander | 0 | 0.0% |
| Some other race | 10 | 0.4% |
| Two or more races | 166 | 6.5% |
| Hispanic or Latino (of any race) | 82 | 3.2% |

=== 2010 census ===
As of the census of 2010, there were 2,358 people, 867 households, and 636 families living in the city. The population density was 896.6 inhabitants per square mile (346.2/km^{2}). There were 922 housing units at an average density of 350.6 per square mile (135.4/km^{2}). The racial makeup of the city was 95.8% White, 0.5% African American, 0.8% Native American, 0.3% Asian, 0.1% from other races, and 2.5% from two or more races. Hispanic or Latino of any race were 1.9% of the population.

There were 867 households, of which 40.8% had children under the age of 18 living with them, 54.1% were married couples living together, 14.3% had a female householder with no husband present, 5.0% had a male householder with no wife present, and 26.6% were non-families. 22.6% of all households were made up of individuals, and 8.2% had someone living alone who was 65 years of age or older. The average household size was 2.64 and the average family size was 3.08.

The median age in the city was 34.2 years. 28.8% of residents were under the age of 18; 7.9% were between the ages of 18 and 24; 28.1% were from 25 to 44; 22.9% were from 45 to 64; and 12.4% were 65 years of age or older. The gender makeup of the city was 47.7% male and 52.3% female.

=== 2000 census ===
As of the census of 2000, there were 1,845 people, 683 households, and 499 families living in the city. The population density was 789.9 inhabitants per square mile (305.0/km^{2}). There were 720 housing units at an average density of 308.3 per square mile (119.0/km^{2}). The racial makeup of the city was 97.67% White, 0.33% African American, 0.65% Native American, 0.05% Asian, 0.16% from other races, and 1.14% from two or more races. Hispanic or Latino of any race were 1.79% of the population. There are 9 Police officers, one for about every 200 citizens. And about the same for Firemen.

There were 683 households, out of which 41.3% had children under the age of 18 living with them, 55.1% were married couples living together, 12.3% had a female householder with no husband present, and 26.9% were non-families. 22.7% of all households were made up of individuals, and 8.5% had someone living alone who was 65 years of age or older. The average household size was 2.62 and the average family size was 3.08.

In the city the population was spread out, with 28.9% under the age of 18, 9.1% from 18 to 24, 31.3% from 25 to 44, 20.4% from 45 to 64, and 10.3% who were 65 years of age or older. The median age was 32 years. For every 100 females, there were 94.6 males. For every 100 females age 18 and over, there were 87.7 males.

The median income for a household in the city was $36,111, and the median income for a family was $39,722. Males had a median income of $28,167 versus $21,920 for females. The per capita income for the city was $14,858. About 9.9% of families and 12.3% of the population were below the poverty line, including 15.9% of those under age 18 and 12.0% of those age 65 or over.
