= Lake Niangua =

- Location within Missouri Location within the United States
- Location: Camden County, Missouri
- Coordinates: 37°55′55.98″N 92°51′06.18″W
- Type: Hydroelectric reservoir
- Primary inflows: Niangua River
- Primary outflows: Niangua River
- Basin countries: United States
- Surface area: 360 acres (150 ha)
- Surface elevation: 712 ft (217 m)

Lake Niangua is a 360-acre (1.5 km^{2}) hydroelectric lake in southern Camden County, Missouri, USA, on the Niangua River. The lake has a public access with a boat ramp and picnic area.

== History of the Tunnel Dam ==
The site for the tunnel dam was chosen because a 500-foot (150 m) long cave was found that extended ridge separating the upper and lower bents of the river. In 1911, the cave was then modified so the river flowed through it during dam construction. There is usually no water running between the dam and the lake's powerhouse.

=== Hydroelectricity ===
Hydroelectric engineers then placed a powerhouse at the upper end of the tunnel for hydroelectricity. In 1930, the powerhouse was moved to the lower end of the tunnel taking advantage of the 43-foot (13 m) drop. The powerhouse has two turbines. The hydroelectric equipment provides 3 megawatts of power for nearby residents.

== Geography of the Lake ==
The lake is only a few feet deep so larger boats are not able to access this lake. To the north there is a steep ridge that is only a few hundred feet wide, this ridge makes the river go an extra four miles (6 km) between the dam and the powerhouse. The shoreline is almost entirely wooded around the lake.
