= Elkland, Missouri =

Unincorporated community in Missouri, U.S.

Coordinates: 37°26′35″N 93°01′52″W

Elkland is an unincorporated community in northwestern Webster County, Missouri, United States. It is located on Route 38, approximately ten miles northwest of Marshfield. Elkland is part of the Springfield, Missouri Metropolitan Statistical Area.

A post office called Elkland has been in operation since 1870. The community so named on account of the presence of elk near the original town site.

In 1987, Elkland resident James Schnick murdered seven of his relatives, and attempted to frame his nephew, Kirk Buckner, who was among his victims. The property was bulldozed in 2022.

In 2018, Elkland resident Helen Viola Jackson was inducted into the Missouri Walk of Fame Jackson was notable as the last living widow of a Civil War Veteran.
