= Niangua River =

Stream in the American state of Missouri

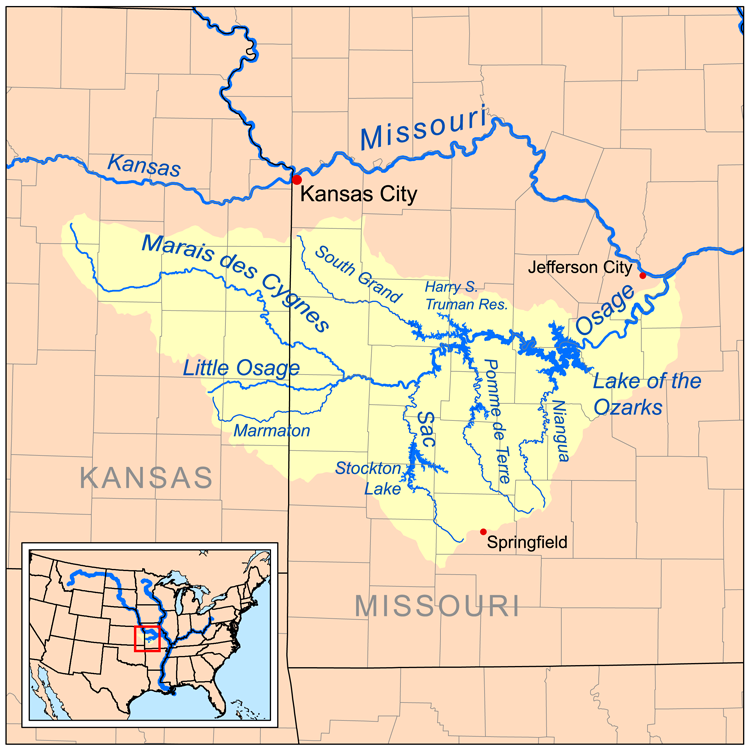
- Map of the Osage River watershed showing the Niangua River

Location
- Country: United States
- State: Missouri

Physical characteristics
- Source
  - location: Webster County, Missouri
  - coordinates: 37°26′46″N 92°55′11″W
  - elevation: 1,136 ft (346 m)
- Mouth: Lake of the Ozarks
  - location: Camden County, Missouri
  - coordinates: 37°57′39″N 92°48′22″W
  - elevation: 663 ft (202 m)
- Length: 125 mi (201 km)
- Basin size: 1,040 sq mi (2,700 km^{2})
- Discharge
  - location: USGS 06923950 at Tunnel Dam near Macks Creek, MO
  - average: 450 cu ft/s (13 m^{3}/s)
  - minimum: 0 cu ft/s (0 m^{3}/s)
  - maximum: 27,700 cu ft/s (780 m^{3}/s)

Basin features
- Tributaries
  - left: Little Niangua River
- Watersheds: Niangua-Osage-Missouri-Mississippi

The Niangua River /naɪˈæŋɡwə/ is a 125-mile-long (201 km) tributary of the Osage River in the Ozarks region of southern and central Missouri in the United States. Via the Osage and Missouri rivers it is part of the watershed of the Mississippi River.

Niangua River has the name of Niangua (or Nehemgar), an Indian tribal leader. The name is said to mean "bear".

== Course ==
The Niangua River is formed in Webster County by the confluence of its short east and west forks, and flows generally northward through Dallas, Laclede and Camden counties, past Bennett Spring, Lake Niangua, and Ha Ha Tonka State Parks. It flows into the Osage River as an arm of the Lake of the Ozarks, which is formed by the Bagnell Dam on the Osage. As part of the lake it collects the Little Niangua River.

== History ==
Old-timers called it Meyongo, and the name was handed down through generations as the way the Osage tribe referred to the river. Zebulon M. Pike explored the Osage Riverin 1806, and claimed "the Yunger (or Ne-hem-gar)" was "so named by the Indians for the many springs at its source." Abundant black bears that roamed alongside the river were hunted by the French and Osage and Creek Indigenous peoples alike.

The river's name, meaning "bear" or "winding stream of many springs," reflects its connection to the Osage Indians and the natural beauty of the Ozarks region. White settlers arrived after the Louisiana Purchase, transforming the area into a hub of farming, logging, and eventually, water-powered mills.

Homesteaders came in the 1830s, attracted to the great spring that significantly increases the flow of the Niangua River. James and Ann Brice arrived from Illinois and purchased 400 acres and in 1837 constructed a watermill. Peter Bennett built a competing mill at the confluence of the spring branch and the Niangua, which later became known as Bennett Spring. The spring at Bennett Spring State Park is believed to release more than 100 million gallons of water per day into the Niangua while the springs at Ha Ha Tonka are said to release more than 48 million gallons per day.

== River accesses ==
This is a list of areas where the Niangua River can be publicly accessed; this list was put in order from beginning of river to where river meets up with Lake of the Ozarks.

- Bridal Cave
- Charity Access- State-owned river access; no camping allowed.
- Cline Ford
- Corkery, an extinct village with campground and canoe rental businesses today.
- Hico Slab- Where a road crosses the river; the bridge is basically a low-lying concrete slab with water tunnels.
- Del Marlin Ford
- Deusenberry Creek
- Gaunt Ford
- Crane Ford
- Route 32 Bridge
- Big John Access- State-owned river access.
- Wimberly Ford
- Dallion Ford
- Hackler Ford
- Williams Ford Access- A one lane road crossing; crossing is a concrete slab where water flows over the top.
- Hwy. K-P Bridge Access- Access includes privately owned campground, picnic area, and shuttle service.
- Moon Valley Access- State-owned river access.
- Hildebrand Ford
- Cat Hollow- Privately owned campground and cabins nearby.
- Route 64 Bridge
- Bennett Springs Access- State-owned river access.
- Barclay Springs- State-owned river access.
- Gilbertson Ford
- Prosperine Access- State-owned river access.
- Mountain Creek- Access includes privately owned campground, picnic area, cabins and shuttle service.
- McPheters Ford
- Smith Ford
- Leadmine Conservation Area- State-owned river access and conservation area; primitive camping allowed.
- Lake Niangua- Includes access and picnic area; no camping allowed.
- Whistle Bridge- Low-lying river crossing, a concrete bridge on Tunnel Dam Road.
- Stone Ford
- Ha Ha Tonka State Park- State-owned river access; this is where the river merges into Lake of the Ozarks.
- Banister Ford, north of Macks Creek.

== Tributaries ==
- AB Creek
- Brush Creek
- Cave Creek
- Danceyard Creek
- Dry Fork
- Durington Creek
- Four Mile Creek
- Jacks Creek
- Jakes Creek
- Jones Branch
- Indian Creek
- Mill Creek
- Mountain Creek
- Raccoon Branch
- Sweet Hollow Creek
- Woolsey Creek

== See also ==
- List of Missouri rivers
