= Dallas County, Missouri =

County in Missouri, United States

- County
- Dallas County Courthouse in Buffalo

- Location within the U.S. state of Missouri
- Coordinates: 37°40′N 93°01′W
- Country: United States
- State: Missouri
- Founded: December 10, 1844
- Named for: George M. Dallas
- Seat: Buffalo
- Largest city: Buffalo

Area
  - Total: 543 sq mi (1,410 km^{2})
  - Land: 541 sq mi (1,400 km^{2})
  - Water: 2.1 sq mi (5.4 km^{2}) 0.4%

Population (2020)
  - Total: 17,071
  - Estimate (2025): 18,025 ▲
  - Density: 31.6/sq mi (12.2/km^{2})
- Time zone: UTC−6 (Central)
  - Summer (DST): UTC−5 (CDT)
- Congressional district: 4th
- Website: www.mocounties.com/dallas-county (Note: This page is hosted by the Missouri Association of Counties, a statewide association of county governments, rather than by the Dallas County government.)

Dallas County is a county located in the U.S. state of Missouri. As of the 2010 census, the population was 17,071. The county seat is Buffalo. The county was organized in 1842 as Niangua County and then renamed in 1844 for George M. Dallas, who served as Vice President under James K. Polk.

Dallas County is part of the Springfield metropolitan area.

== Geography ==
According to the United States Census Bureau, the county has a total area of 543 square miles (1,410 km^{2}), of which 541 square miles (1,400 km^{2}) is land and 2.1 square miles (5.4 km^{2}) (0.4%) is water.

=== Adjacent counties ===
- Camden County (north)
- Laclede County (east)
- Webster County (south)
- Greene County (southwest)
- Polk County (west)
- Hickory County (northwest)

=== Major highways ===
- U.S. Route 65
- Route 32
- Route 64
- Route 64A
- Route 73

== Demographics ==
Historical population
Census	Pop.	Note	%±
1850	3,648		—
1860	5,892		61.5%
1870	8,383		42.3%
1880	9,263		10.5%
1890	12,647		36.5%
1900	13,903		9.9%
1910	13,181		−5.2%
1920	12,033		−8.7%
1930	10,541		−12.4%
1940	11,523		9.3%
1950	10,392		−9.8%
1960	9,314		−10.4%
1970	10,054		7.9%
1980	12,096		20.3%
1990	12,646		4.5%
2000	15,661		23.8%
2010	16,777		7.1%
2020	17,071		1.8%
2025 (est.)	18,025	▲	5.6%
U.S. Decennial Census; 1790-1960 1900-1990; 1990-2000 2010

=== Racial and ethnic composition ===
Dallas County, Missouri – Racial and ethnic composition Note: the US Census treats Hispanic/Latino as an ethnic category. This table excludes Latinos from the racial categories and assigns them to a separate category. Hispanics/Latinos may be of any race.
Race / Ethnicity (NH = Non-Hispanic)	Pop 1980	Pop 1990	Pop 2000	Pop 2010	Pop 2020	% 1980	% 1990	% 2000	% 2010	% 2020
White alone (NH)	11,928	12,462	15,164	16,037	15,696	98.61%	98.54%	96.83%	95.59%	91.95%
Black or African American alone (NH)	15	16	19	29	44	0.12%	0.13%	0.12%	0.17%	0.26%
Native American or Alaska Native alone (NH)	67	86	117	139	92	0.55%	0.68%	0.75%	0.83%	0.54%
Asian alone (NH)	15	17	10	40	25	0.12%	0.13%	0.06%	0.24%	0.15%
Native Hawaiian or Pacific Islander alone (NH)	x	x	5	8	15	x	x	0.03%	0.05%	0.09%
Other race alone (NH)	1	0	6	3	43	0.01%	0.00%	0.04%	0.02%	0.25%
Mixed race or Multiracial (NH)	x	x	193	261	836	x	x	1.23%	1.56%	4.90%
Hispanic or Latino (any race)	70	65	147	260	320	0.58%	0.51%	0.94%	1.55%	1.87%
Total	12,096	12,646	15,661	16,777	17,071	100.00%	100.00%	100.00%	100.00%	100.00%

=== 2020 census ===
As of the 2020 census, the county had a population of 17,071. The median age was 42.9 years. 23.9% of residents were under the age of 18 and 20.7% of residents were 65 years of age or older. For every 100 females there were 101.1 males, and for every 100 females age 18 and over there were 99.8 males age 18 and over.

The racial makeup of the county was 92.8% White, 0.3% Black or African American, 0.6% American Indian and Alaska Native, 0.1% Asian, 0.1% Native Hawaiian and Pacific Islander, 0.6% from some other race, and 5.5% from two or more races. Hispanic or Latino residents of any race comprised 1.9% of the population.

0.0% of residents lived in urban areas, while 100.0% lived in rural areas.

There were 6,625 households in the county, of which 28.9% had children under the age of 18 living with them and 21.4% had a female householder with no spouse or partner present. About 26.5% of all households were made up of individuals and 12.9% had someone living alone who was 65 years of age or older.

There were 7,588 housing units, of which 12.7% were vacant. Among occupied housing units, 77.6% were owner-occupied and 22.4% were renter-occupied. The homeowner vacancy rate was 2.3% and the rental vacancy rate was 8.7%.

Racial composition in Dallas County
Race	Num.	Perc.
White (NH)	15,696	92%
Black or African American (NH)	44	0.26%
Native American (NH)	92	0.54%
Asian (NH)	25	0.14%
Pacific Islander (NH)	15	0.09%
Other/Mixed (NH)	879	5.15%
Hispanic or Latino	320	1.9%

=== 2000 census ===
As of the 2000 census, there were 15,661 people, 6,030 households and 4,383 families residing in the county. The population density was 29 inhabitants per square mile (11/km^{2}). There were 6,914 housing units at an average density of 13 units per square mile (5.0/km^{2}). The racial makeup of the county was 97.45% White, 0.12% Black or African American, 0.76% Native American, 0.07% Asian, 0.03% Pacific Islander, 0.20% from other races, and 1.37% from two or more races. Approximately 0.94% of the population were Hispanic or Latino of any race. 3.57% percent reported speaking Pennsylvania German or German at home. Dallas County is the county with the largest concentration of Kauffman Amish Mennonites, who have preserved Pennsylvania German as their everyday language and an old form of Standard German for church. They had 950 adherents in Dallas County in 2010.

There were 6,030 households, out of which 32.90% had children under the age of 18 living with them, 60.80% were married couples living together, 8.40% had a female householder with no husband present, and 27.30% were non-families. 23.70% of all households were made up of individuals, and 11.60% had someone living alone who was 65 years of age or older. The average household size was 2.57 and the average family size was 3.04.

In the county, the population was spread out, with 27.50% under the age of 18, 7.40% from 18 to 24, 26.40% from 25 to 44, 23.50% from 45 to 64, and 15.20% who were 65 years of age or older. The median age was 38 years. For every 100 females, there were 98.30 males. For every 100 females age 18 and over, there were 95.70 males.

The median income for a household in the county was $27,346; the median income for a family was $33,500. Males had a median income of $26,438 versus $17,569 for females. The per capita income for the county was $15,106. About 14.20% of families and 17.90% of the population were below the poverty line, including 25.40% of those under age 18 and 18.50% of those age 65 or over.

== Education ==
=== Public schools ===
- Dallas County R-I School District – Buffalo
  - Mallory Elementary School (PK-04)
  - Buffalo Middle School (05-08)
  - Buffalo High School (09-12)
- Hickory County R-I School District – Urbana
  - Skyline Elementary School (K-04)
  - Skyline Middle School (05-08)
  - Skyline High School (09-12)

=== Private schools ===
- Meadowlark Hill - (PK-08) - Mennonite - Tunas
- Prairie Grove School - (01-08) - Amish - Buffalo

== Communities ==
=== Cities ===
- Buffalo (county seat)
- Urbana

=== Village ===
- Louisburg

=== Census-designated place ===
- Bennett Springs

=== Other unincorporated places ===
- Boyd
- Celt
- Charity
- Cloverdale
- Elixer
- Foose
- Handley
- Leadmine
- Long Lane
- March
- Mathis
- Olive
- Plad
- Redtop
- Reynolds
- Shady Grove
- Spring Grove
- Tunas
- Wall Street
- Windyville
- Wood Hill

== Notable people ==
- Roy Meeker - professional baseball player

== Politics ==
=== Local ===
Dallas County, Missouri

Elected countywide officials
Assessor	Shelly Jasper	Republican
Circuit Clerk	Susan Faulkner	Republican
County Clerk	Missy Kjar Darnell	Republican
Collector	Amy Faulkner	Republican
Commissioner (presiding)	John Crawford	Republican
Commissioner (northern district)	Roger Bradley	Republican
Commissioner (southern district)	Mike Lewis	Republican
Coroner	Matt Wisdom	Republican
Prosecuting Attorney	Jonathan Barker	Republican
Public Administrator	Carol Johnson	Republican
Recorder	Kami Miller	Republican
Sheriff	Scott Rice	Republican
Surveyor	Greg Maynard	Republican
Treasurer	Stephanie Hendricks	Republican

The Republican Party predominantly controls politics at the local level in Dallas County. Republicans hold all of the elected positions in the county.

=== State ===
Past gubernatorial elections results
Year	Republican	Democratic	Third parties
2024	79.79% 6,665	18.05% 1,508	2.16% 180
2020	82.10% 6,646	15.98% 1,294	1.91% 155
2016	66.67% 4,943	29.82% 2,211	3.51% 260
2012	53.42% 3,882	43.32% 3,148	3.26% 237
2008	41.92% 3,212	54.46% 4,173	3.61% 277
2004	65.01% 4,708	33.43% 2,421	1.56% 113
2000	55.16% 3,429	42.99% 2,672	1.85% 115
1996	54.60% 3,083	41.80% 2,360	3.60% 203

All of Dallas County is a part of Missouri's 129th district in the Missouri House of Representatives and is represented by John Black (R-Marshfield) since 2019.

Missouri House of Representatives — District 129 — Dallas County (2020)
Party	Candidate	Votes	%	±%
Republican	Jeff Knight	6,703	84.86%	+10.28%
Democratic	Dewanna Marquez	1,196	15.14%	+10.27%

Missouri House of Representatives — District 129 — Dallas County (2018)
Party	Candidate	Votes	%	±%
Republican	Jeff Knight	4,777	74.58%	−13.39%
Democratic	Ronna Ford	1,628	25.41%	+25.41%

Missouri House of Representatives — District 129 — Dallas County (2016)
Party	Candidate	Votes	%	±%
Republican	Sandy Crawford	6,375	87.97%	+5.72
Independent	Charles Mantranga	872	12.03%	+12.03

Missouri House of Representatives — District 129 — Dallas County (2014)
Party	Candidate	Votes	%	±%
Republican	Sandy Crawford	3,003	82.25%	+5.34
Democratic	John L. Wilson	648	17.75%	−5.34

Missouri House of Representatives — District 129 — Dallas County (2012)
Party	Candidate	Votes	%	±%
Republican	Sandy Crawford	5,523	76.91%	
Democratic	John L. Wilson	1,658	23.09%	

All of Dallas County is a part of Missouri's 28th district in the Missouri Senate. The seat has been held by Sandy Crawford since 2017.

Missouri Senate — District 28 — Dallas County (2018)
Party	Candidate	Votes	%	±%
Republican	Sandy Crawford	5,363	83.27%	+5.38%
Democratic	Joe Poor	1,077	16.72%	−5.38%

Missouri Senate — District 28 — Dallas County — Special (2017)
Party	Candidate	Votes	%	±%
Republican	Sandy Crawford	1,494	77.89%	−22.11%
Democratic	Albert Skalicky	424	22.10%	+22.10%

Missouri Senate — District 28 — Dallas County (2014)
Party	Candidate	Votes	%	±%
Republican	Mike Parson	3,132	100.00%	

=== Federal ===
U.S. Senate — Missouri — Dallas County (2018)
Party	Candidate	Votes	%	±%
Republican	Josh Hawley	4,682	72.10%	+3.43%
Democratic	Claire McCaskill	1,594	24.55%	−2.11%
Libertarian	Japeth Campbell	87	1.34%	−1.11%
Green	Jo Crain	36	0.55%	−0.62%
Independent	Craig O'Dear	94	1.44%	+1.44%

U.S. Senate — Missouri — Dallas County (2016)
Party	Candidate	Votes	%	±%
Republican	Roy Blunt	5,101	68.67%	+19.84
Democratic	Jason Kander	1,980	26.66%	−16.03
Libertarian	Jonathan Dine	182	2.45%	−6.03
Green	Johnathan McFarland	87	1.17%	+1.17
Constitution	Fred Ryman	78	1.05%	+1.05

U.S. Senate — Missouri — Dallas County (2012)
Party	Candidate	Votes	%	±%
Republican	Todd Akin	3,514	48.83%	
Democratic	Claire McCaskill	3,072	42.69%	
Libertarian	Jonathan Dine	610	8.48%	

All of Dallas County is included in Missouri's 4th congressional district and is currently represented by Mark Alford (R-Lake Winnebago) in the U.S. House of Representatives.

U.S. House of Representatives — Missouri's 4th congressional district — Dallas County (2020)
Party	Candidate	Votes	%	±%
Republican	Vicky Hartzler	6,498	81.62%	+2.08%
Democratic	Lindsey Simmons	1,255	15.76%	−2.27%
Libertarian	Mark Bliss	208	2.61%	+0.20%

U.S. House of Representatives — Missouri’s 4th congressional district — Dallas County (2018)
Party	Candidate	Votes	%	±%
Republican	Vicky Hartzler	5,129	79.54%	+0.01%
Democratic	Renee Hoagenson	1,163	18.03%	+1.70%
Libertarian	Mark Bliss	156	2.41%	−0.92

U.S. House of Representatives — Missouri’s 4th congressional district — Dallas County (2016)
Party	Candidate	Votes	%	±%
Republican	Vicky Hartzler	5,804	79.53%	+0.87
Democratic	Gordon Christensen	1,192	16.33%	+0.21%
Libertarian	Mark Bliss	302	4.14%	−1.73%

U.S. House of Representatives — Missouri's 4th congressional district — Dallas County (2014)
Party	Candidate	Votes	%	±%
Republican	Vicky Hartzler	2,875	78.66%	+7.03
Democratic	Nate Irvin	589	16.12%	−7.69
Libertarian	Herschel L. Young	185	5.06%	+2.38
Write-In	Greg A. Cowan	6	0.16%	+0.16

U.S. House of Representatives — Missouri's 4th congressional district — Dallas County (2012)
Party	Candidate	Votes	%	±%
Republican	Vicky Hartzler	5,133	71.63%	
Democratic	Teresa Hensley	1,706	23.81%	
Libertarian	Thomas Holbrook	192	2.68%	
Constitution	Greg A. Cowan	135	1.88%	

==== Political culture ====
United States presidential election results for Dallas County, Missouri
Year	Republican		Democratic		Third party(ies)	
Year	No.	%	No.	%	No.	%
1888	1,169	49.37%	706	29.81%	493	20.82%
1892	1,174	49.77%	586	24.84%	599	25.39%
1896	1,466	48.75%	1,525	50.71%	16	0.53%
1900	1,506	53.56%	1,238	44.03%	68	2.42%
1904	1,711	64.81%	797	30.19%	132	5.00%
1908	1,609	61.96%	955	36.77%	33	1.27%
1912	1,051	43.02%	870	35.61%	522	21.37%
1916	1,428	56.92%	1,022	40.73%	59	2.35%
1920	2,665	69.93%	1,100	28.86%	46	1.21%
1924	2,188	61.03%	1,304	36.37%	93	2.59%
1928	2,835	74.94%	931	24.61%	17	0.45%
1932	1,958	47.34%	2,143	51.81%	35	0.85%
1936	3,066	63.50%	1,749	36.23%	13	0.27%
1940	3,859	71.00%	1,566	28.81%	10	0.18%
1944	3,232	75.06%	1,064	24.71%	10	0.23%
1948	2,695	62.73%	1,590	37.01%	11	0.26%
1952	3,459	73.19%	1,258	26.62%	9	0.19%
1956	2,987	65.12%	1,600	34.88%	0	0.00%
1960	3,522	70.38%	1,482	29.62%	0	0.00%
1964	2,268	53.35%	1,983	46.65%	0	0.00%
1968	2,835	62.49%	1,237	27.26%	465	10.25%
1972	3,120	74.20%	1,085	25.80%	0	0.00%
1976	2,430	49.49%	2,453	49.96%	27	0.55%
1980	3,297	60.63%	2,011	36.98%	130	2.39%
1984	3,577	65.29%	1,902	34.71%	0	0.00%
1988	2,898	55.55%	2,293	43.95%	26	0.50%
1992	2,116	34.97%	2,533	41.86%	1,402	23.17%
1996	2,554	45.01%	2,277	40.13%	843	14.86%
2000	3,723	59.86%	2,311	37.16%	185	2.97%
2004	4,788	65.96%	2,407	33.16%	64	0.88%
2008	4,895	63.71%	2,656	34.57%	132	1.72%
2012	4,992	68.58%	2,122	29.15%	165	2.27%
2016	5,895	79.10%	1,272	17.07%	286	3.84%
2020	6,619	81.68%	1,380	17.03%	105	1.30%
2024	6,907	81.83%	1,458	17.27%	76	0.90%

=== Missouri presidential preference primary (2008) ===
Former U.S. Senator Hillary Clinton (D-New York) received more votes, a total of 1,157, than any candidate from either party in Dallas County during the 2008 presidential primary. She narrowly edged out former Governor Mike Huckabee (R-Arkansas) by four votes.

== See also ==
- National Register of Historic Places listings in Dallas County, Missouri
