= Buffalo, Missouri =

City in Missouri, U.S.

- City
- Downtown Buffalo Dallas County Courthouse Buffalo's Oldest Brick Building

- Location of Buffalo, Missouri
- Coordinates: 37°38′40″N 93°05′49″W
- Country: United States
- State: Missouri
- County: Dallas

Area
  - Total: 2.88 sq mi (7.45 km^{2})
  - Land: 2.88 sq mi (7.45 km^{2})
  - Water: 0 sq mi (0.00 km^{2})
- Elevation: 1,148 ft (350 m)

Population (2020)
  - Total: 3,290
  - Density: 1,143.8/sq mi (441.63/km^{2})
- Time zone: UTC-6 (Central (CST))
  - Summer (DST): UTC-5 (CDT)
- ZIP code: 65622
- Area code: 417
- FIPS code: 29-09514
- GNIS feature ID: 2393455
- Website: City of Buffalo

Buffalo is a city in and the county seat of Dallas County, Missouri, United States. The population was 3,290 at the 2020 census.

Buffalo is part of the Springfield, Missouri Metropolitan Area.

== History ==
Buffalo was platted in 1841, and named after a Buffalo Skull marker that was erected at the (now) 65 and 32 highway intersection, the native home of a first settler. A post office called Buffalo has been in operation since 1846.

== Demographics ==
Historical population
Census	Pop.	Note	%±
1870	278		—
1880	437		57.2%
1890	861		97.0%
1900	757		−12.1%
1910	820		8.3%
1920	915		11.6%
1930	835		−8.7%
1940	920		10.2%
1950	1,213		31.8%
1960	1,477		21.8%
1970	1,915		29.7%
1980	2,217		15.8%
1990	2,414		8.9%
2000	2,781		15.2%
2010	3,084		10.9%
2020	3,290		6.7%
U.S. Decennial Census

Buffalo is the home to the Dallas County R-I School District. The school district service area includes students from western Laclede, southern Dallas, and eastern Polk counties. The school district includes an elementary school in Buffalo (Dillard A. Mallory Elementary). Buffalo Prairie Middle School, Buffalo High School, and the Dallas County Technical Center are all part of the school district. The mascot for Dallas County R-I Schools is the Bison (commonly named Buffy). The school district is part of the Central Ozarks Conference (COC) and currently has an enrollment of approximately 1,800 students grades K-12.

=== 2020 census ===
As of the 2020 census, Buffalo had a population of 3,290. The median age was 40.7 years. 22.7% of residents were under the age of 18 and 22.9% of residents were 65 years of age or older. For every 100 females there were 90.7 males, and for every 100 females age 18 and over there were 84.9 males age 18 and over.

0.0% of residents lived in urban areas, while 100.0% lived in rural areas.

There were 1,364 households in Buffalo, of which 26.9% had children under the age of 18 living in them. Of all households, 33.9% were married-couple households, 19.4% were households with a male householder and no spouse or partner present, and 36.8% were households with a female householder and no spouse or partner present. About 38.4% of all households were made up of individuals and 18.8% had someone living alone who was 65 years of age or older.

There were 1,558 housing units, of which 12.5% were vacant. The homeowner vacancy rate was 4.2% and the rental vacancy rate was 8.8%.

Racial composition as of the 2020 census
Race	Number	Percent
White	2,978	90.5%
Black or African American	9	0.3%
American Indian and Alaska Native	40	1.2%
Asian	9	0.3%
Native Hawaiian and Other Pacific Islander	1	0.0%
Some other race	16	0.5%
Two or more races	237	7.2%
Hispanic or Latino (of any race)	107	3.3%

=== 2010 census ===
As of the census of 2010, there were 3,084 people, 1,266 households, and 760 families living in the city. The population density was 1,078.3 inhabitants per square mile (416.3/km^{2}). There were 1,518 housing units at an average density of 530.8 per square mile (204.9/km^{2}). The racial makeup of the city was 95.8% White, 0.3% African American, 0.9% Native American, 0.2% Asian, 0.2% Pacific Islander, 1.1% from other races, and 1.6% from two or more races. Hispanic or Latino of any race were 3.2% of the population.

There were 1,266 households, of which 32.7% had children under the age of 18 living with them, 37.4% were married couples living together, 16.9% had a female householder with no husband present, 5.8% had a male householder with no wife present, and 40.0% were non-families. 34.4% of all households were made up of individuals, and 16.8% had someone living alone who was 65 years of age or older. The average household size was 2.30 and the average family size was 2.92.

The median age in the city was 37.9 years. 25.1% of residents were under the age of 18; 8.4% were between the ages of 18 and 24; 23.4% were from 25 to 44; 22.2% were from 45 to 64; and 20.9% were 65 years of age or older. The gender makeup of the city was 45.1% male and 54.9% female.

=== 2000 census ===
As of the census of 2000, there were 2,781 people, 1,213 households, and 702 families living in the city. The population density was 1,265.1 inhabitants per square mile (488.5/km^{2}). There were 1,367 housing units at an average density of 621.9 per square mile (240.1/km^{2}). The racial makeup of the city was 96.91% White, 0.29% African American, 0.72% Native American, 0.04% Asian, 0.36% from other races, and 1.69% from two or more races. Hispanic or Latino of any race were 1.26% of the population.

There were 1,213 households, out of which 28.7% had children under the age of 18 living with them, 40.8% were married couples living together, 14.4% had a female householder with no husband present, and 42.1% were non-families. 37.3% of all households were made up of individuals, and 21.3% had someone living alone who was 65 years of age or older. The average household size was 2.20 and the average family size was 2.89.

In the city, the population was spread out, with 24.9% under the age of 18, 9.5% from 18 to 24, 26.0% from 25 to 44, 18.2% from 45 to 64, and 21.4% who were 65 years of age or older. The median age was 37 years. For every 100 females, there were 84.8 males. For every 100 females age 18 and over, there were 76.6 males.

The median income for a household in the city was $19,632, and the median income for a family was $26,179. Males had a median income of $24,306 versus $16,397 for females. The per capita income for the city was $11,942. About 25.9% of families and 28.9% of the population were below the poverty line, including 50.4% of those under age 18 and 18.6% of those age 65 or over.

== Geography ==
The city is located in west central Dallas County, approximately 2.5 miles west of the Niangua River. The city is served by U.S. Route 65 and Missouri state routes 73 and 32. Bolivar is about 18 miles to the west and Marshfield about 22 miles to the southeast. Springfield lies 28 miles to the south-southwest along Route 65.

According to the United States Census Bureau, the city has a total area of 2.86 square miles (7.41 km^{2}), all land.

=== Climate ===
Climate data for Buffalo, Missouri (1991–2020 normals, extremes 1931–1932, 1961–present)
Month	Jan	Feb	Mar	Apr	May	Jun	Jul	Aug	Sep	Oct	Nov	Dec	Year
Record high °F (°C)	74 (23)	82 (28)	91 (33)	91 (33)	93 (34)	102 (39)	109 (43)	107 (42)	100 (38)	95 (35)	83 (28)	78 (26)	109 (43)
Mean maximum °F (°C)	66.5 (19.2)	70.4 (21.3)	78.2 (25.7)	83.5 (28.6)	86.9 (30.5)	91.9 (33.3)	96.5 (35.8)	96.8 (36.0)	91.6 (33.1)	83.9 (28.8)	74.1 (23.4)	67.2 (19.6)	98.4 (36.9)
Mean daily maximum °F (°C)	42.6 (5.9)	48.0 (8.9)	57.5 (14.2)	67.6 (19.8)	75.6 (24.2)	83.9 (28.8)	88.9 (31.6)	87.5 (30.8)	80.5 (26.9)	69.7 (20.9)	56.7 (13.7)	46.1 (7.8)	67.0 (19.4)
Daily mean °F (°C)	31.3 (−0.4)	35.8 (2.1)	45.0 (7.2)	54.9 (12.7)	64.0 (17.8)	72.6 (22.6)	77.3 (25.2)	75.7 (24.3)	67.6 (19.8)	56.3 (13.5)	44.8 (7.1)	35.1 (1.7)	55.0 (12.8)
Mean daily minimum °F (°C)	20.1 (−6.6)	23.6 (−4.7)	32.6 (0.3)	42.2 (5.7)	52.4 (11.3)	61.4 (16.3)	65.8 (18.8)	63.8 (17.7)	54.8 (12.7)	43.0 (6.1)	32.8 (0.4)	24.1 (−4.4)	43.1 (6.2)
Mean minimum °F (°C)	0.9 (−17.3)	5.7 (−14.6)	14.2 (−9.9)	25.7 (−3.5)	35.5 (1.9)	48.7 (9.3)	54.8 (12.7)	52.2 (11.2)	40.1 (4.5)	27.3 (−2.6)	14.8 (−9.6)	7.2 (−13.8)	−3.4 (−19.7)
Record low °F (°C)	−19 (−28)	−30 (−34)	−4 (−20)	14 (−10)	27 (−3)	36 (2)	44 (7)	39 (4)	24 (−4)	14 (−10)	1 (−17)	−28 (−33)	−30 (−34)
Average precipitation inches (mm)	2.40 (61)	2.22 (56)	3.50 (89)	4.93 (125)	5.77 (147)	4.44 (113)	3.93 (100)	4.20 (107)	4.11 (104)	3.53 (90)	3.75 (95)	2.48 (63)	45.26 (1,150)
Average snowfall inches (cm)	4.1 (10)	1.7 (4.3)	1.2 (3.0)	0.0 (0.0)	0.0 (0.0)	0.0 (0.0)	0.0 (0.0)	0.0 (0.0)	0.0 (0.0)	0.0 (0.0)	0.5 (1.3)	1.5 (3.8)	9.0 (23)
Average precipitation days (≥ 0.01 in)	6.9	6.9	9.9	10.5	12.1	10.0	8.2	7.9	7.2	8.2	8.6	6.3	102.7
Average snowy days (≥ 0.1 in)	2.0	2.0	0.6	0.0	0.0	0.0	0.0	0.0	0.0	0.0	0.4	1.1	6.1
Source: NOAA

== Economy ==
Much of the economy of Buffalo is related to agriculture, government, education, and healthcare.

=== Top employers ===
Major employers include Dallas County R-1 Schools, Dallas County government, the City of Buffalo, Wood's Supermarket, O'Bannon Bank, and Bank of Urbana.

== Government ==
Buffalo was a Fourth class (population less than 3,000) city in 2016. Buffalo city government has a mayor and six aldermen. Buffalo provides municipal water and sewer and contracts for refuse service.

== Education ==
The Dallas County R-1 School District serves Buffalo and surrounding areas. Approximately 1700 students attend 4 schools, including Mallory Elementary, Buffalo Prairie Middle School, Dallas County Technical Center, and Buffalo High School.

The town has a lending library, the Dallas County Library.

== Recreation ==
Buffalo has two large city parks. The city also features an extensive network of trails and sidewalks connecting Buffalo Prairie Middle School to the south across town to the new city park to the north.

Buffalo features numerous opportunities within the city for recreation including Buffalo Bowl, several restaurants, and various street festivals throughout the year.

Nearby Missouri Department of Conservation areas include the Barclay Conservation Area, Bennett Spring Access, Bennett Spring Fish Hatchery, Goose Creek Conservation Area, and Lead Mine Conservation Area.

Recreational resources in the area include Pomme de Terre Lake and various theaters, shopping and other entertainment in Bolivar, Springfield and the Lake of the Ozarks area.

== Sports ==
In 2015, the Lady Bison high school basketball team competed in the Final 4 at state competition. In 2020 they won a football district championship.

== Arts and culture ==
Buffalo has for years hosted the Southwest Missouri Celtic Heritage Festival & Highland Games.

Buffalo annually hosts the Buffalo Art Walk and Craft Fair.

== Transportation ==
=== Highways ===
Buffalo is served by U.S. Route 65 which connects the city with Branson, Springfield, Warsaw, and Sedalia. Missouri Route 32 carries traffic from El Dorado Springs, Stockton, Fair Play, Bolivar, Lebanon, Lynchburg and other communities. Missouri Route 73 connects Buffalo to U.S. Route 54 in Camden County.

=== Airport ===
The Buffalo Municipal Airport is a city-owned public-use airport located 1.2 miles (1.9 km) north of Buffalo's central business district.

== Notable people ==
- Hugh Alexander, baseball player
- Marion Tinsley Bennett, US Congressman, 1943–1949
- Philip Allen Bennett, Missouri Senator and Lt. Governor, US Congressman
- Miranda Maverick, fighter in the flyweight division of the UFC
- James B. Potter, Jr., Los Angeles City Council member, 1963–71
- Terry D. Scott, 10th Master Chief Petty Officer of the U.S. Navy
- Dallas Willard, Christian philosopher and author.

== See also ==
- List of cities in Missouri
