= Pembina, Missouri =

Unincorporated community in Missouri, U.S.

Coordinates: 37°04′01″N 93°07′19″W

Pembina is an unincorporated community in northern Christian County, in the U.S. state of Missouri. The community was located at the intersection of Missouri routes 125 and U, approximately 1.5 miles north of Linden and Finley Creek. The Pembina Cemetery is approximately one mile to the northwest, across Parched Corn Hollow in the center of Section 33.

== History ==
A post office called Pembina was established in 1884, and remained in operation until 1906. The community was named after a nearby Baptist church of the same name.
