= Velsor, Missouri =

Extinct town in the US state of Missouri

Coordinates: 37°01′13″N 93°02′09″W

Velsor is an extinct town in northern Christian County, in the U.S. state of Missouri. The GNIS classifies it as a populated place. The community was northeast of Sparta between Missouri Route 14 and Finley Creek.

A post office called Velsor was established in 1881, and remained in operation until 1901. The community has the name of James Velsor, an early settler.
