= Swan Creek (White River tributary) =

Stream in the U.S. state of Missouri

Swan Creek is a stream in the Ozarks of southern Missouri. It is a tributary of the White River downstream from the Lake Taneycomo dam.

The stream headwaters are at coordinates: 37°01′01″N 92°48′55″W in northwest Douglas County just southwest of the intersection of Missouri Route 14 and Missouri Route AK at an elevation of about 1640 feet. The stream flows generally west passing Ongo and Honey Branch Cave before leaving Douglas County. After entering Christian County just southwest of Ongo, the stream flows southwest past Keltner and then turns south a short distance east of Chadwick. The stream flows south and is bridged by Missouri Route 125 just east of Garrison. The stream flows southwest and is bridged by Missouri Route AA just southeast of the community of Swan. The stream continues to the south-southwest through incised meanders until reaching its confluence with the White River just east of Forsyth at Shadow Rock Park at coordinates: 36°40′57″N 93°06′20″W.

== History ==
Swan Creek has the name of the local Swan family.

== See also ==
- List of rivers of Missouri
