= Clever, Missouri =

- City
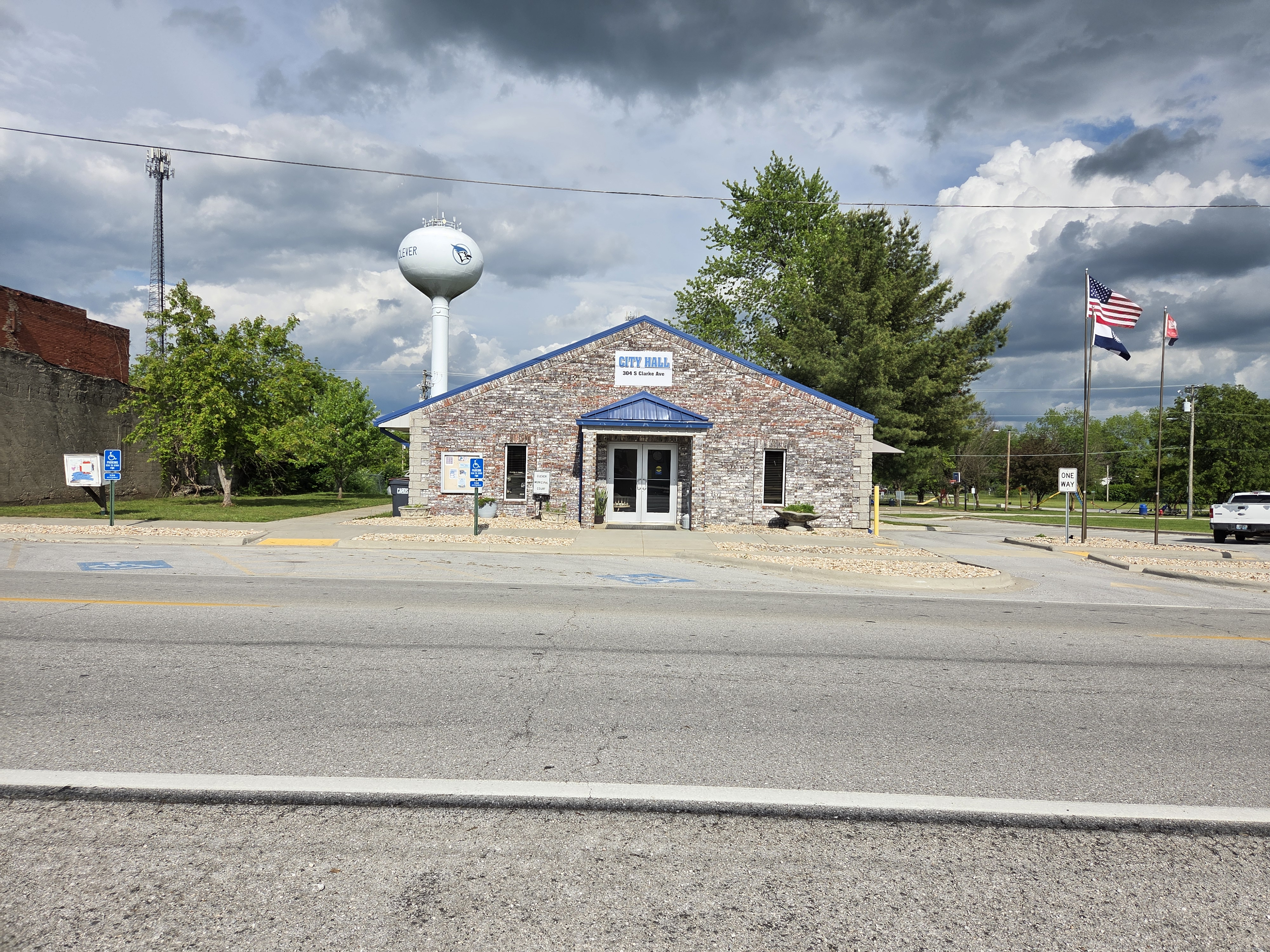
- Clever city hall

- Logo
- Nickname: Summit City
- Motto: "Where it just gets better everyday."
- Location of Clever, Missouri
- Coordinates: 37°1′49″N 93°28′23″W
- Country: United States
- State: Missouri
- County: Christian
- Post Office Established: 1896
- Incorporated: 1909

Government
  - Type: Council-Mayor
  - Mayor: Dale Maisel
  - Mayor pro tem: Scott Hackworth

Area
  - Total: 1.50 sq mi (3.89 km^{2})
  - Land: 1.50 sq mi (3.89 km^{2})
  - Water: 0 sq mi (0.00 km^{2})
- Elevation: 1,398 ft (426 m)

Population (2020)
  - Total: 2,918
  - Density: 1,943.9/sq mi (750.56/km^{2})
- Time zone: UTC-6 (Central (CST))
  - Summer (DST): UTC-5 (CDT)
- ZIP code: 65631
- Area code: 417
- FIPS code: 29-14788
- GNIS feature ID: 0715973
- Website: www.clevermo.gov

Clever is a city in Christian County, Missouri, United States. As of the 2020 census, Clever had a population of 2,918. It is part of the Springfield, Missouri Metropolitan Statistical Area. Clever, like the rest of Christian County, saw a significant increase in population between 2000 and 2010.

== Geography ==
Clever is located on the Springfield Plateau of the Missouri Ozarks, 14.5 miles (23.3 km) southwest of Springfield at an elevation of 1,398 feet (426 m). The town lies in the western panhandle of Christian County, just south of Missouri Highway 14 between Nixa and Billings. The town of Republic and the Wilson's Creek National Battlefield are approximately six miles to the north and northeast.

According to the United States Census Bureau, the city has a total area of 1.26 square miles (3.26 km^{2}), all land.

== History ==
Lincoln Township and the land that would eventually become the town of Clever remained largely unsettled for many years after Missouri became a state in 1821. A U.S. Government land survey was not conducted until 1834, and the first land transaction was not registered until 1845. More settlers came to southwest Missouri by the Old Wire Road. Following a portion of the Great Osage Trail, the road extended from St. Louis, Missouri southwest to Fort Smith, Arkansas, passing through Springfield, Missouri and on through Christian County. Supply trains and settlers headed for Fort Smith arrived. The Butterfield Overland Mail Route 1858–1861 period passed through after a change of horses at Ashmore Station. A telegraph line ran along the same route as well, giving rise to its name.

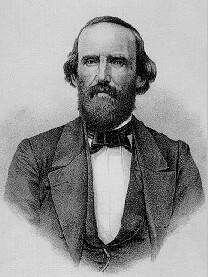
General Benjamin McCulloch

Prior to Clever's existence as a town, a Civil War battle took place nearby. On August 2, 1861, the Battle of Dug Springs pitted the Union forces of General Nathaniel Lyon against the numerically superior combined Confederate forces of General Benjamin McCulloch, Arkansas State Troops under General Nicholas Bartlett Pearce, and Missouri State Guard under General (and Missouri Governor) Sterling Price. The battle, along present-day Old Wire Road, was the first time during the Missouri Campaign of 1861 that the Union "Army of the West" and Confederate forces met in conflict. Despite being outnumbered more than two to one, Lyon's Union forces prevailed in the battle. The clash is seen as a precursor to the much larger and strategically important Battle of Wilson's Creek eight days later.

Following the end of the Civil War, a road from Springfield to Billings, Missouri crossed Old Wire Road, and it was this crossroads that gave rise to Clever. Farmer Ike Teague constructed a two-story home at the crossroads around 1890. A short time later a physician, Doctor Bishop, purchased the home and constructed a building across the road with the intent of opening a drug store and mercantile. However, he died unexpectedly before its completion. It would sit vacant until a year later, around 1894, when William Wilson purchased the building and opened the first store in the future Clever. The first post office was established in the store in 1896 with Frank Netzer—now the store's proprietor—as postmaster.

When the first choice for a post office name was rejected by the federal government, Netzer surveyed customers. Tom Lentz suggested "Clever" because the young community's residents were friendly and wise.

Growth of the small crossroads village was slow at first. A blacksmith shop, second store building, and meeting hall had been constructed by 1902, and a tomato-canning factory was established in 1904.

The next year, surveyors for the Missouri Pacific Railroad laid out a route from Springfield to Crane, Missouri that passed through Clever. At this same time, the plat for Clever was officially surveyed and laid out. A 300-foot-deep well was drilled for community use and operated by a small gasoline engine until electricity came to Clever in 1928. By 1908, the growing town featured many new business spurred by the railroad, including a hotel, lumber yard, photography studio, bank, movie theater, flour mill, and several mercantile and hardware establishments. With this rapid growth, residents felt it was time to officially organize as a municipality, and petitioned the Christian County Court, which granted the request and appointed Clever's first board of trustees in February, 1909.

In 1910, Clever's first documented population in the United States Census was 248.

Its location on the railroad meant an opportunity for entertainment not normal for a typical small town of the era. A series of Chautauqua events over the course of several summers entertained the residents, as did famed showman and Wild West figure William "Buffalo Bill" Cody in 1913. Famed ragtime composer and pianist Blind Boone performed in concert at the Clever school gym.

Through the first half of the 20th century, the population remained relatively stable, at around 500 residents. However, between 1990 and 2000 the population nearly doubled, from 580 to 1,010, and then more than doubled again between 2000 and 2010, from 1,010 to 2,139.

On May 4, 2003, a series of tornadoes passed by the outer reaches of the town. The tornado outbreak resulted in major property damage, numerous livestock deaths, and one human fatality.

== Demographics ==
Historical population
Census	Pop.	Note	%±
1910	248		—
1920	347		39.9%
1930	334		−3.7%
1940	291		−12.9%
1950	273		−6.2%
1960	283		3.7%
1970	430		51.9%
1980	551		28.1%
1990	580		5.3%
2000	1,010		74.1%
2010	2,139		111.8%
2020	2,918		36.4%

=== 2020 census ===
As of the 2020 census, Clever had a population of 2,918. The median age was 29.9 years. 31.7% of residents were under the age of 18 and 9.4% of residents were 65 years of age or older. For every 100 females there were 91.8 males, and for every 100 females age 18 and over there were 90.6 males age 18 and over.

0.0% of residents lived in urban areas, while 100.0% lived in rural areas.

There were 1,070 households in Clever, of which 44.4% had children under the age of 18 living in them. Of all households, 55.3% were married-couple households, 12.9% were households with a male householder and no spouse or partner present, and 21.4% were households with a female householder and no spouse or partner present. About 20.3% of all households were made up of individuals and 7.3% had someone living alone who was 65 years of age or older.

There were 1,112 housing units, of which 3.8% were vacant. The homeowner vacancy rate was 3.3% and the rental vacancy rate was 1.0%.

Racial composition as of the 2020 census
Race	Number	Percent
White	2,660	91.2%
Black or African American	18	0.6%
American Indian and Alaska Native	17	0.6%
Asian	12	0.4%
Native Hawaiian and Other Pacific Islander	0	0.0%
Some other race	13	0.4%
Two or more races	198	6.8%
Hispanic or Latino (of any race)	88	3.0%

=== 2010 census ===
As of the census of 2010, there were 2,139 people, 817 households, and 602 families residing in the city. The population density was 1,697.6 inhabitants per square mile (655.4/km^{2}). There were 880 housing units at an average density of 698.4 per square mile (269.7/km^{2}). The racial makeup of the city was 2028 (96.3%) White, 7 (0.3%) African American, 1.1% Native American, 0.3% from other races, and 30 (2.0%) from two or more races. Hispanic or Latino people of any race were 53 (2.5%) of the population.

There were 817 households, of which 44.2% had children under the age of 18 living with them, 56.9% were married couples living together, 10.8% had a female householder with no husband present, 6.0% had a male householder with no wife present, and 26.3% were non-families. 20.9% of all households were made up of individuals, and 8.5% had someone living alone who was 65 years of age or older. The average household size was 2.62 and the average family size was 3.01.

The median age in the city was 29 years. 30.2% of residents were under the age of 18; 9.2% were between the ages of 18 and 24; 35.6% were from 25 to 44; 16.3% were from 45 to 64; and 8.7% were 65 years of age or older. The gender makeup of the city is 1034 (48.3%) male and 1105 (51.7%) female.

=== 2000 census ===
As of the census of 2000, there were 1,010 people, 388 households, and 282 families residing in the city. The population density was 1,581.7 inhabitants per square mile (610.7/km^{2}). There were 420 housing units at an average density of 657.7 per square mile (253.9/km^{2}). The racial makeup of the city was 97.72% White, 0.30% Native American, 0.10% Asian, and 1.88% from two or more races. Hispanic or Latino people of any race were 1.88% of the population.

There were 388 households, out of which 43.0% had children under the age of 18 living with them, 58.8% were married couples living together, 10.3% had a female householder with no husband present, and 27.3% were non-families. 23.5% of all households were made up of individuals, and 11.9% had someone living alone who was 65 years of age or older. The average household size was 2.60 and the average family size was 3.09.

In the city, the population was spread out, with 31.4% under the age of 18, 6.6% from 18 to 24, 35.0% from 25 to 44, 15.8% from 45 to 64, and 11.2% who were 65 years of age or older. The median age was 31 years. For every 100 females, there were 83.0 males. For every 100 females age 18 and over, there were 82.8 males.

The median income for a household in the city was $32,798, and the median income for a family was $38,500. Males had a median income of $27,955 versus $21,477 for females. The per capita income for the city was $14,958. About 3.6% of families and 6.0% of the population were below the poverty line, including 7.8% of those under age 18 and 8.2% of those age 65 or over.

== City government ==
The City of Clever has four aldermen, each elected for a two-year term on a nonpartisan basis, and a mayor, also elected for a two-year term. The current mayor is Chris McPhail, who assumed office in July 2025 after the death of Mayor Scott Hackworth. The current aldermen are Kristi Jack (East Ward 1), Michel Hackworth (East Ward 2), Wade Pearce (West Ward 1), and Eric Beaudoin (West Ward 2). Melissa Rutherford serves as the city clerk.

The city provides a small police department for public safety, led by Chief Randall Blackburn. Fire protection is provided for the city and surrounding rural areas by the Clever Fire Protection District, a volunteer department.

== Education ==
The first school building in Clever was constructed in 1909. A two-room, two-story brick building, it served to educate students from a number of previous small, rural, one-room schoolhouses, including the Pleasant Hope school, one half mile north of Clever. Additions were made in 1912 and 1916 that provided for education up to tenth grade. In 1919, Blooming Grove and Taylor schools merged with Clever to form Consolidated District Number 5. In 1920, it became a four-year high school.

A fire in the spring of 1931 destroyed the building; however, a larger two-story brick building was built in time for the following school year. Merges with several small rural districts in the mid-20th century led to the creation of the current Clever R-V (5) school district. The district now provides pre-kindergarten through 12th grade education to the community and rural portions of Christian County. In the 2010–11 school year, there were 1,119 students enrolled in the Clever R-V school district.

== Notable people ==
- Sue Hawk, reality TV contestant in Survivor: Borneo (2000) and Survivor: All-Stars (2004)
- Robert Mandan, actor, best known for his role as Chester Tate on the TV satire Soap
- Jim Winn, former professional baseball pitcher for the Pittsburgh Pirates
