= Ongo, Missouri =

Unincorporated community in Missouri, U.S.

Coordinates: 36°59′26″N 92°53′39″W

Ongo is an unincorporated community in northwestern Douglas County, Missouri, United States. Ongo is located on Missouri Route UU, on the north bank of Swan Creek. The Douglas-Christian county line is approximately one mile to the west. Missouri Route 14 is about two miles to the north and Honey Branch Cave, about one mile north.

Ongo had a post office from 1897 until 1949.
