= Parched Corn Creek =

Stream in the American state of Missouri

Parched Corn Creek or Parched Corn Hollow is a stream valley in Christian and Greene counties in the Ozarks of southwest Missouri. It is a tributary of Finley Creek.

The stream headwaters in southeastern Greene County are at 37°05′41″N 93°06′39″W and the confluence with Finley Creek in Ozark County is at 37°02′29″N 93°10′28″W. The source area for the stream is in the southeast corner of Greene County and it flows to the southwest into Christian County and crosses under Missouri Route 125. It continues on southwest to join the Finley about halfway between Linden and Ozark.

According to oral etymology, Parched Corn Creek was so named as it was typically as dry as parched corn.

== See also ==
- List of rivers of Missouri
