= Dean Deetz =

American baseball player (born 1993)

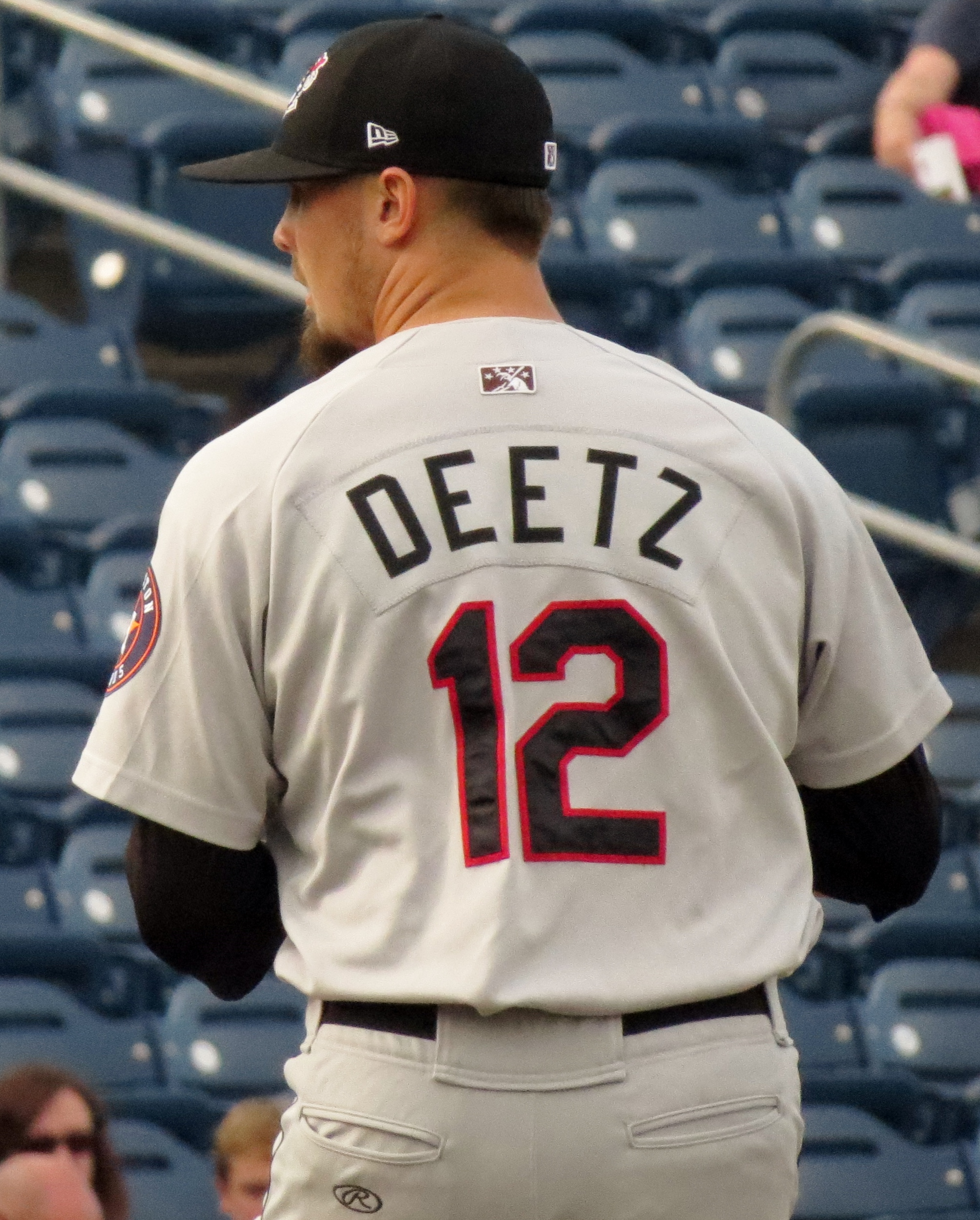
- Deetz with the Tri-City Valley Cats in 2015
- Pitcher
- Born: November 29, 1993 (age 32); Nixa, Missouri, U.S.
- Batted: Right Threw: Right

MLB debut
- September 5, 2018, for the Houston Astros

Last MLB appearance
- September 26, 2018, for the Houston Astros

MLB statistics
- Win–loss record: 0–0
- Earned run average: 5.40
- Strikeouts: 3
- Stats at Baseball Reference

Teams
- Houston Astros (2018)

Dean Arthur Deetz (born November 29, 1993) is an American former professional baseball pitcher. He was drafted by the Houston Astros in the 11th round of the 2014 Major League Baseball draft. Deetz made his Major League Baseball (MLB) debut in 2018.

== Career ==
Deetz attended Nixa High School in Nixa, Missouri and played college baseball at the Northeastern Oklahoma A&M College.

=== Houston Astros ===
Deetz was drafted by the Houston Astros in the 11th round, with the 316th overall selection, of the 2014 Major League Baseball draft.

Deetz made his professional debut with the rookie–level Greeneville Astros where he pitched to an 8.88 ERA and 2–4 record in 13 games. He played 2015 with the Low–A Tri-City ValleyCats and Single–A Quad Cities River Bandits, posting a combined 9–3 record and 1.70 ERA in 63 2/3 innings pitched between the two clubs, and 2016 with the High–A Lancaster JetHawks and Double–A Corpus Christi Hooks, where he went a combined 8–5 with a 3.76 ERA between both teams. He started 2017 with Corpus Christi and was promoted to the Triple–A Fresno Grizzlies during the season. After going 7–6 with a 4.25 ERA in 16 games between Corpus Christi and Fresno, the Astros added him to their 40-man roster after the season.

Deetz made his MLB debut on September 5, 2018. He split the 2019 season between the rookie–level Gulf Coast League Astros, Corpus Christi, and Round Rock Express, going a combined 3–0 with a 6.63 ERA over 38 innings. On January 9, 2020, Deetz was designated for assignment, and outrighted to Triple–A on January 16. Deetz did not play in a game in 2020 due to the cancellation of the minor league season because of the COVID-19 pandemic. He became a free agent on November 2.

=== Kansas City Monarchs ===
On May 17, 2021, Deetz signed with the Kansas City Monarchs of the American Association of Professional Baseball. Deetz was released on June 1 after recording an 18.00 ERA in 2 appearances.

=== Sioux Falls Canaries ===
On May 11, 2022, Deetz signed with the Sioux Falls Canaries of the American Association of Professional Baseball. In 2022, Deetz recorded a 0–0 record and 297.00 ERA in 2 appearances with the Canaries. On June 4, 2022, Deetz was released by the Canaries.
