= Garrison, Missouri =

Unincorporated community in Missouri, U.S.

Coordinates: 36°50′20″N 93°01′11″W

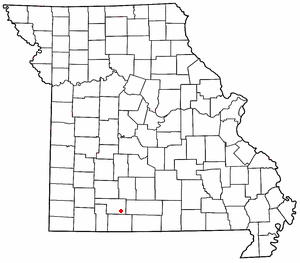

Garrison is an unincorporated community in southeast Christian County, Missouri, United States. It is located on Route 125, approximately 15 miles southeast of Sparta.

Garrison is part of the Springfield, Missouri Metropolitan Statistical Area.

A post office called Garrison was established in 1884, and remained in operation until 1995. The community has the name of the Garrison family of settlers.
