= Finley Falls, Missouri =

Extinct town in the American state of Missouri

Coordinates: 37°08′19″N 92°50′25″W

Finley Falls is an extinct town in southern Webster County, in the U.S. state of Missouri. The GNIS classifies it as a populated place. The community is located on Little Finley Creek, approximately 3.5 miles west-southwest of Seymour on Webster County Road 322.

The community took its name from a nearby cascade on Finley Creek.
