= Stewart Creek =

Location
- Country: United States
- State: Missouri
- Region: Douglas and Christian counties

Physical characteristics
- Source
  - coordinates: 37°03′54″N 92°50′36″W
- Mouth
  - coordinates: 37°03′39″N 92°58′29″W
  - elevation: 1,253 ft (382 m)

Stewart Creek is a stream in the northwestern Douglas and northeastern Christian counties of southern Missouri. The headwaters are north of Dogwood. The stream flows southwest crossing Missouri Route Z and enters Christian County west of Dogwood turning west and flowing past the community of Abadyl northeast of Bruner. The stream turns northwest paralleling Stewart Creek Road toward its confluence with Finley Creek.

Stewart Creek was named after the local Stewart family.

== See also ==
- List of rivers of Missouri
