= Jackson Cantwell =

American football player (born 2008)

No. 79 – Miami Hurricanes
- Position: Offensive tackle
- Class: Freshman

Personal information
- Born: May 27, 2008 (age 18); Columbia, Missouri, U.S.
- Listed height: 6 ft 8 in (2.03 m)
- Listed weight: 330 lb (150 kg)

Career information
- High school: Nixa (Nixa, Missouri)
- College: Miami (2026–present)

Jackson Daniel Cantwell (born May 27, 2008) is an American college football offensive tackle for the Miami Hurricanes. He was one of the top college football recruits for the class of 2026. He was also a top track and field athlete and a high school national champion in shot put.

== Early life ==
Cantwell was born on May 27, 2008, in Columbia, Missouri to Olympic shot puters Christian Cantwell and Teri Steer. He began training three days a week in track and field. At age 12, he broke the AAU national shot put record for his age group, and he later set world records in the 12-year-old and 13-year-old groups in both shot put and discus throw. In eighth grade, Cantwell was able to bench press 315 pounds (143 kg).

Cantwell moved to Nixa, Missouri when he was in third grade. He attended Nixa Public High School, where he played football as an offensive tackle, basketball and continued competing in track and field. He became the starter on the football team as a freshman and was named a MaxPreps first-team freshman All-American. He also won the Missouri state shot put championship as a freshman with a toss of over 64 feet (20 m). He had received over a dozen offers to play college football for top programs by the end of his freshman season.

In 2024, Cantwell broke the national sophomore record in shot put with a toss of 74.975 feet (22.852 m) and later won the high school national championship, beating out second place by over 5 feet (1.5 m). He was named the Gatorade Missouri boys track and field player of the year. As a junior in football, Cantwell recorded 158 pancake blocks and helped Nixa finish second in the Missouri Class 6, being named the Springfield News-Leader player of the year, the Gatorade Missouri player of the year, and one of three finalists for the national Gatorade player of the year award. Cantwell is a five-star prospect and a top player in the class of 2026, being ranked number one nationally by 247Sports Composite, Rivals.com, and On3.com, while ESPN ranked him second. In May 2025, he committed to play for the Miami Hurricanes.
