= Keltner, Missouri =

- Community
- Location in the state of Missouri Keltner (the United States)
- Coordinates: 36°58′8″N 92°56′54″W
- Country: United States
- State: Missouri
- County: Christian County
- Elevation: 333 m (1,093 ft)
- Time zone: UTC-6 (CST)
  - Summer (DST): UTC-5 (CDT)

Keltner, Missouri, is an unincorporated community in eastern Christian County, Missouri United States. It is located approximately seventeen miles east of Ozark on Keltner Road, just off Missouri Supplemental Route T. Keltner lies in the Swan Creek Valley within the Mark Twain National Forest. The Sugar Camp dam and lake lie just to the north in the Sugar Camp Creek valley.

Keltner had a post office from 1905 to 1973 with ZIP code 65678. Mail is now served by the post office in Oldfield.

Keltner is part of the Springfield, Missouri Metropolitan Statistical Area.
