= Pembina =

Pembina may refer to:

== Canada ==
=== Alberta ===
- Pembina (Alberta federal electoral district), a former federal electoral district
- Pembina, Edmonton, a neighbourhood in Edmonton
- Pembina Institute, an environmental research group
- Pembina oil field, an oil- and gas-producing region in central Alberta
- Pembina Pipeline, a pipeline company
- Pembina River (Alberta), a river in central Alberta
- Pembina River Provincial Park

=== Manitoba ===
- Municipality of Pembina, a municipality in southern Manitoba
  - Rural Municipality of Pembina, a former municipality
  - Pembina (Manitoba provincial electoral district), a former provincial electoral district
- North Pembina, original name for West Lynne, Manitoba
- Pembina Trails School Division, Winnipeg Metro Region
- Pembina Valley Region
- Pembina Valley Provincial Park
- Winnipeg Route 42, commonly known as Pembina Highway

== United States ==
- Pembina County, Minnesota, a historical county in Minnesota Territory
- Pembina, Missouri an unincorporated community in Christian County
- Pembina County, North Dakota
  - Pembina, North Dakota, a city in Pembina County
- Pembina Region, a historical unorganized territory now part of North and South Dakota
- Pembina Township, Mahnomen County, Minnesota

== Canada and the United States ==
- Pembina Band of Chippewa Indians, a historical tribe that lived along upper Red River of the North and its tributaries
- Pembina–Emerson Border Crossing in North Dakota and Manitoba
- Pembina Escarpment in North Dakota and Manitoba
- Pembina River (Manitoba – North Dakota)

== See also ==
- Pembina Hills (disambiguation)
