= McKinley, Missouri =

Unincorporated community in Missouri, U.S.

Coordinates: 37°03′40″N 93°37′39″W

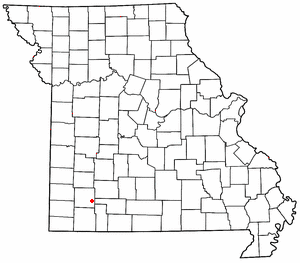

McKinley is an unincorporated community in Lawrence County, Missouri, United States. It is located on Route 14, approximately five miles west of Billings.

A post office called McKinley was established in 1891, and remained in operation until 1910. The community has the name of a pioneer citizen.
