= Hurricane Hollow =

Valley in Missouri, United States

Coordinates: 36.8147807°N 93.2726835°W

Hurricane Hollow is a valley in Christian and Taney counties in the U.S. state of Missouri.

Hurricane Hollow was named for a hurricane which struck the area in the 1890s.
