= Riverdale, Missouri =

- Community
- Location in the state of Missouri Riverdale (the United States)
- Coordinates: 36°59′43″N 93°17′24″W
- Country: United States
- State: Missouri
- County: Christian County
- Elevation: 326 m (1,070 ft)
- Time zone: UTC-6 (CST)
  - Summer (DST): UTC-5 (CDT)

Riverdale is an unincorporated community in western Christian County in southern Missouri, United States. The community lies on Finley Creek, approximately four miles southwest of Ozark and two miles east of the Christian - Stone county line. U.S. Route 160 is about one-half mile southwest of the site. The Finley is dammed at Riverdale.

== History ==
The site was chosen for a water mill site by a Benjamin H. Hooten circa 1840. This was followed by numerous others, leading to the construction of a three-story mill building in the early 1890s. By 1896, Riverdale had a general store and post office. In the early 1900s, the current dam was constructed and an iron truss bridge crossed the waterway. The mill burned in 1926 and was not rebuilt, ending the era of flour production.
