= Linden Township, Christian County, Missouri =

Township in Christian County, Missouri, U.S.

Coordinates: 37°03′27″N 93°06′10″W

Linden Township is a township in Christian County, in the U.S. state of Missouri.

Linden Township was named for the town of Linden, one of the earliest settlements in the county.
