= McCracken Township, Christian County, Missouri =

Township in Christian County, Missouri, U.S.

Coordinates: 37°00′00″N 93°09′09″W

McCracken Township is an inactive township in Christian County, in the U.S. state of Missouri.

McCracken Township was established in 1886, and named after McCracken, Missouri.
