= McCracken, Missouri =

Unincorporated community in Missouri, U.S.

Coordinates: 37°01′03″N 93°09′29″W

McCracken is an unincorporated community in Christian County, in the U.S. state of Missouri. It is about 3.3 miles east of Ozark, Missouri.

== History ==
The McCracken area got rail service when a subsidiary of the St. Louis–San Francisco Railway (Frisco) extended a line from Ozark, Missouri to Chadwick, Missouri, in the Spring of 1883. A post office called McCracken was established in 1896, and remained in operation until 1932. The community was named after Samuel McCracken, a local merchant. McCracken in the 1890's was a thriving community with a general mercantile store, a blacksmith shop, several other business establishments, and even a mobile photography studio parked on the rail siding offering portrait pictures at $3/dozen. But passenger service on the Frisco line was discontinued in March 1933, and in 1934 the line from Ozark to Chadwick was abandoned entirely.
