= Sparta Township, Christian County, Missouri =

Township in Christian County, Missouri, U.S.

Coordinates: 36.9921°N 93.08368°W

Sparta Township is a township in east-central Christian County, Missouri.

The organization date and origin of the name of Sparta Township is unknown, but it is likely interrelated to the town Sparta located in the township.
