= South Linn Township, Christian County, Missouri =

Township in Christian County, Missouri, U.S.

South Linn Township is a township in Christian County, Missouri, United States.

South Linn Township was named for the linden trees within its borders.

== Geography ==
The township of South Linn is located at coordinates 36°51′25″N 93°7′17″W. According to the United States Census Bureau, the township has a total area of 89.25 km², of which 89.25 km² is land and (0%) 0 km² is water.
