= Bruner Township, Christian County, Missouri =

Township in Christian County, Missouri, U.S.

Coordinates: 37.00793°N 92.96181°W

Bruner Township is a township in eastern Christian County, Missouri.

The organization date and origin of the name of Bruner Township is unknown.
