= Jamesville, Missouri =

Unincorporated community in Stone County, Missouri, United States

Coordinates: 36°57′36″N 93°22′16″W

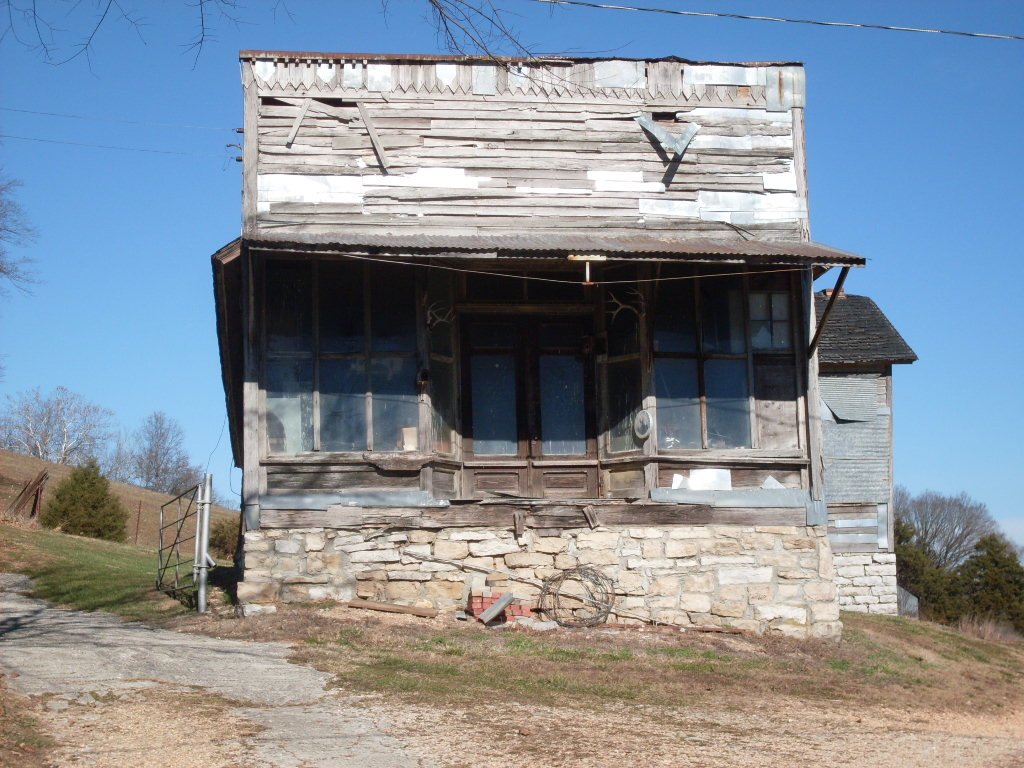
Old store building along Route M in Jamesville

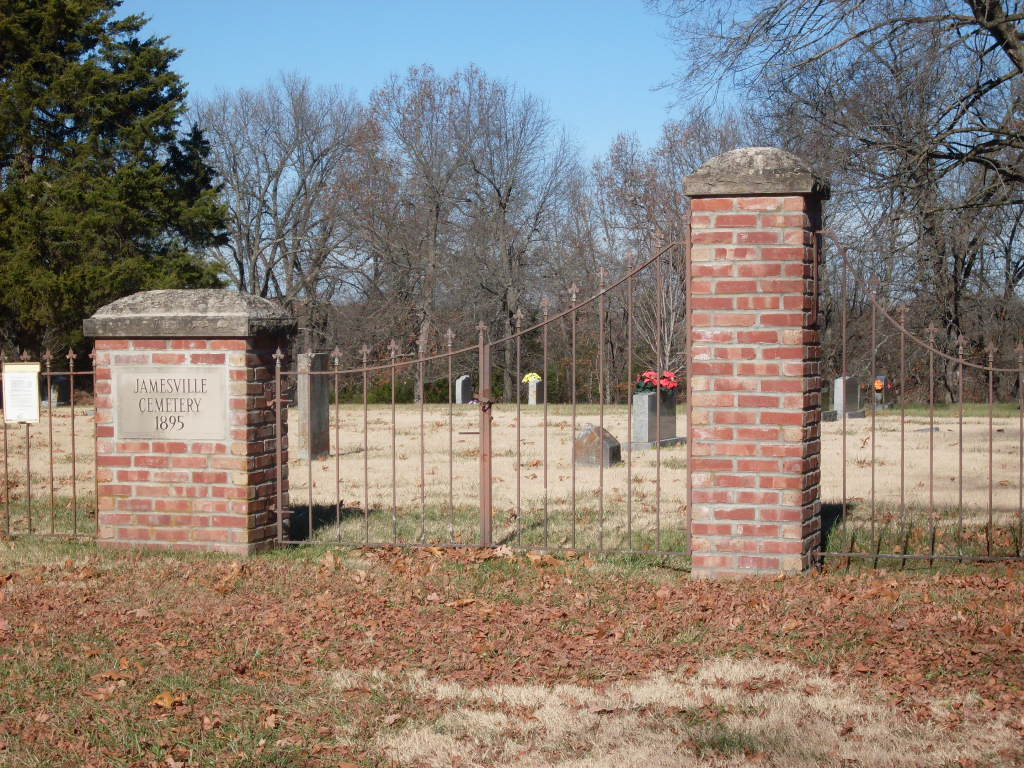
The cemetery at Jamesville at the intersection of Routes M and U

Jamesville is an unincorporated community in northeast Stone County, Missouri, United States. The community is located just west of the confluence of Finley Creek and the James River, along Missouri Route M.

The historic Jamesville School was located along Finley Creek to the east of the settlement.
