= North Linn Township, Christian County, Missouri =

Township in Christian County, Missouri, U.S.

Coordinates: 36°54′46″N 93°09′36″W

North Linn Township is a township in Christian County, in the U.S. state of Missouri.

North Linn Township was named for the linden trees within its borders.
