= North Galloway Township, Christian County, Missouri =

Township in Christian County, Missouri, U.S.

Coordinates: 36°56′28″N 93°16′24″W

North Galloway Township is an inactive township in Christian County, in the U.S. state of Missouri.

North Galloway Township was named in memory of Mr. Galloway, a casualty of the Civil War.
