= East Benton Township, Christian County, Missouri =

Township in Christian County, Missouri, U.S.

Coordinates: 37.06435°N 92.94909°W

East Benton Township is a township in northeastern Christian County, Missouri.

The organization date and origin of the name of East Benton Township is unknown.
