= Missouri Route 14 =

State highway in Missouri, U.S.

Route 14
- MO 14 highlighted in red

Route information
- Maintained by MoDOT
- Length: 119.946 mi (193.034 km)
- Existed: 1926–present

Major junctions
- East end: US 63 in West Plains
- US 65 in Ozark; US 160 / Route 13 in Nixa; US 60 / Route 413 in Billings
- West end: US 60 in Marionville

Location
- Country: United States
- State: Missouri

Highway system
- Missouri State Highway System; Interstate; US; State; Supplemental
← Route 13	→ Route 15

Route 14 is a state highway traveling through the southern part of the U.S. state of Missouri. Its western terminus is at U.S. Route 60 (US 60) in Marionville, and its eastern terminus is at US 63 on the northern edge of West Plains. Route 14 is a two-lane highway for its entire length, however, there are plans to widen Route 14 in some spots.

Formerly this road's western terminus was at US 71 in Joplin, and its eastern terminus was at US 67 southwest of Poplar Bluff. These sections are now US 160, Route 174, and Interstate 44 (I-44). The section between Mount Vernon and the southeast corner of Douglas County was Route 40 from 1922 to 1926.

== Route description ==
Route 14 begins at US 60 in northern Marionville. Shortly after beginning it goes into an old alignment of US 60 making a sharp curve at McKinley. It then heads east joining with (for one mile) U.S. Route 60 and Route 413 where it proceeds to pass through Clever and crosses the James River west of Nixa. At Nixa is an intersection with U.S. Route 160 and Route 13. Route 14 then continues east out of Nixa, through heavier traffic, and crosses Business U.S. Route 65. Route 14 now runs through downtown Ozark united with US 65 and heads on a straight course out of Ozark towards Sparta. The road starts to become more hilly west of Sparta.

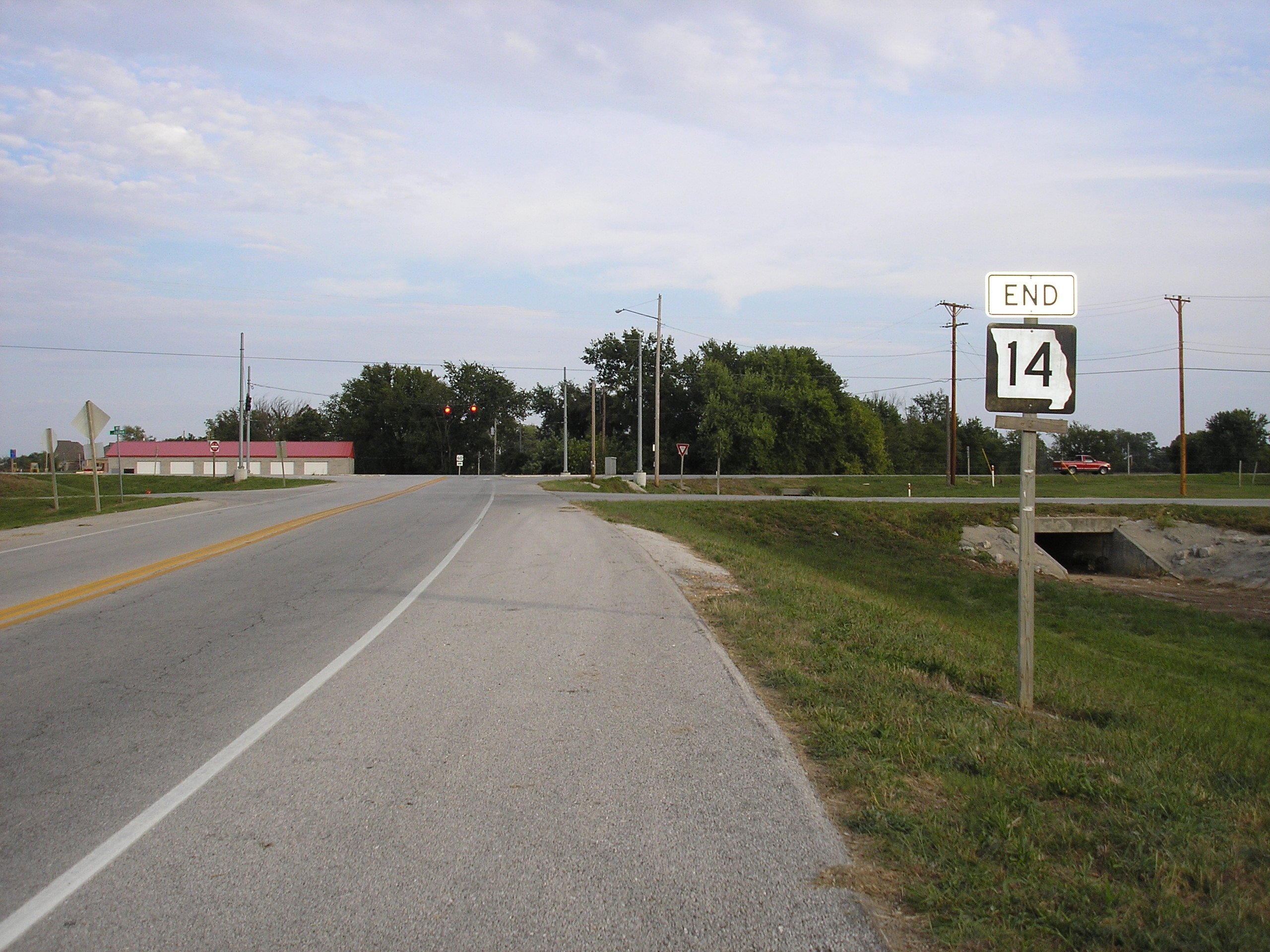
Western terminus of Route 14 in Marionville.

Route 14 then joins with Route 125 for two miles (3.2 km) where it starts to wind its way east towards Ava. Once Route 14 reaches Ava it meets an intersection with Route 76 and Route 5. Route 14 continues on east for twenty-three miles (37 km) more until it intersects Route 95 twenty-eight miles (45 km) west of U.S. Route 63. Route 14 continues twenty-eight miles where it reaches US 63 and then, for 4.8 miles (7.7 km), forms a concurrency with Route 181 towards the twin bridges east. At the end of the concurrency it enters the Mark Twain National Forest and then passes through the hilly country of the Ozarks. Next, Route 14 passes through a town where it then goes 52 miles (84 km) before it reaches another town. After those 52 miles it reaches its end at an intersection with US 63 at the northern boundary of West Plains.

== Major intersections ==
County	Location	mi	km	Destinations	Notes
Lawrence	Marionville	0.000	0.000	US 60	
Lawrence	McKinley	4.305	6.928	Route T north to Route 174	
Christian	Billings	8.060	12.971	US 60 west / Route 413 south – Marionville	west end of US 60 / Route 413 overlap
Christian	Billings	8.654	13.927	US 60 east / Route 413 north (Northeast Elm Street) – Republic	east end of US 60 / Route 413 overlap
Christian	Nixa	24.477	39.392	US 160 / Route 13 – Springfield, Highlandville	
Christian	Ozark	29.227	47.036	US 65 – Springfield, Branson	interchange; west end of US 65 Bus. overlap
Christian	Ozark	29.539	47.538	US 65 Bus. south (South Street) to US 65	east end of US 65 Bus. overlap
Christian	Sparta	38.530	62.008	Route 125 north – Linden, Christian County	west end of Route 125 overlap
Christian	Sparta	39.250	63.167	Route 125 south – Oldfield, Chadwick	east end of Route 125 overlap
Douglas	Ava	66.828	107.549	Route 5 / Route 76 – Mansfield, Gainesville	west end of Route 5 Bus. overlap
Douglas	Ava	68.190	109.741	Route 5 Bus. south	east end of Route 5 Bus. overlap; traffic circle around town square
Douglas	Gentryville	90.531	145.696	Route 95 – Mountain Grove	
Douglas		99.648	160.368	Route 181 south – Dora	west end of Route 181 overlap
Douglas		104.413	168.036	Route 181 north to Route 76	east end of Route 181 overlap, between the Twin Bridges over the North Fork River and its tributary Spring Creek
Howell	West Plains	119.946	193.034	US 63 – Willow Springs, West Plains	
1.000 mi = 1.609 km; 1.000 km = 0.621 mi

== See also ==
- List of state highways in Missouri
