= Pembina Hills =

Pembina Hills may refer to:

- Pembina Escarpment, a landform in South Dakota, North Dakota, and Manitoba
- Pembina Hills Regional Division No. 7, a school board in Alberta

== See also ==
- Pembina (disambiguation)
