= Rueter, Missouri =

Extinct hamlet in Missouri, U.S.

Coordinates: 36°36′30″N 92°52′09″W

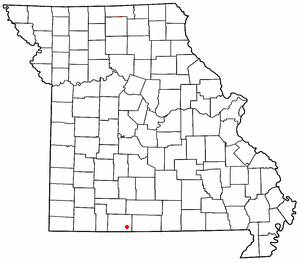

Rueter is an extinct town in southeastern Taney County, Missouri. The GNIS classifies it as a populated place. The town site is located at western intersection of U.S. Route 160 and Route 125. Rueter is part of the Branson, Missouri Micropolitan Statistical Area.

A post office called Rueter was established in 1906. A variant spelling was "Reuter". One Mr. Reuter, an early postmaster, gave the community his last name.

== See also ==
- List of ghost towns in Missouri
