= Polk Township, Christian County, Missouri =

United States township

Coordinates: 37°03′13″N 93°33′11″W

Polk Township is a township in Christian County, Missouri. It was named after James Polk, the 11th president of the United States.
