= Lead Hill Township, Christian County, Missouri =

Township in Christian County, Missouri, U.S.

Coordinates: 36°56′02″N 92°56′33″W

Lead Hill Township is an inactive township in Christian County, Missouri. A school with the same name was also named this because it was a name of ′situation or direction′.
