= Oldfield Township, Christian County, Missouri =

Township in Christian County, Missouri, U.S.

Coordinates: 36.96565°N 93.02417°W

Oldfield Township is a township in eastern Christian County, Missouri.

The organization date and origin of the name of Oldfield Township is unknown.
