= Protem, Missouri =

Unincorporated community in Missouri, U.S.

Coordinates: 36°31′44″N 92°51′32″W

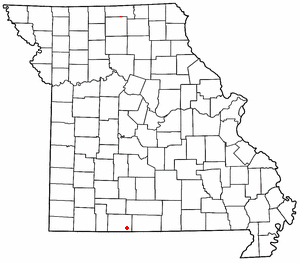
Map of Missouri with a red dot denoting the location of Protem

Protem (/proʊˈtɛm/ proh-TEM) is an unincorporated community in southeastern Taney County, Missouri, United States. It is located on Missouri Route 125, and is approximately two miles (3.2 km) north of the Missouri-Arkansas state line. Protem is part of the Branson, Missouri Micropolitan Statistical Area.

A post office called Protem has been in operation since 1875. The name comes from pro tem, a common abbreviation of the Latin term pro tempore ("for the time being"), because the community's first settlers could not decide on a name and a temporary one (which became permanent) was needed.
