= Holless Wilbur Allen =

American bowyer (1909–1979)

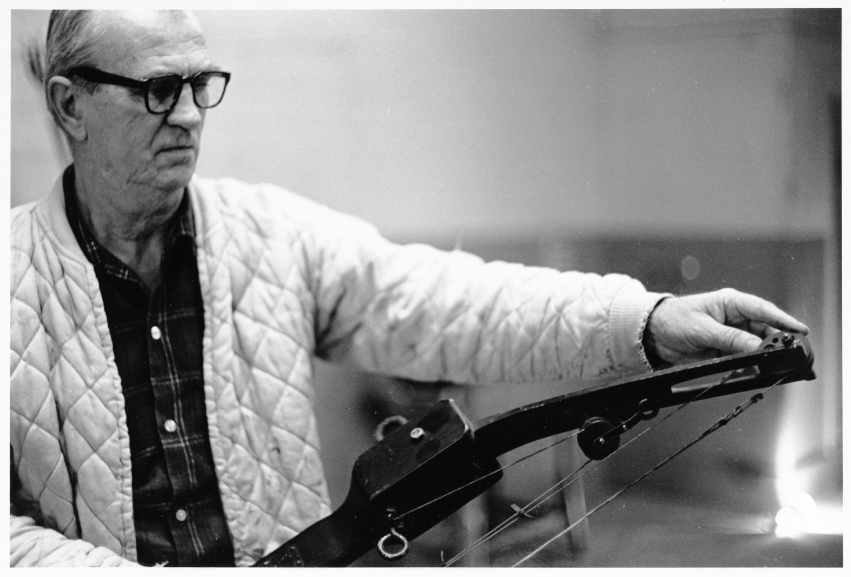
- Allen in 1969
- Born: July 12, 1909; Stilwell, Kansas, US
- Died: June 28, 1979 (69 years old); Billings, Missouri, US
- Known for: Inventing the compound bow

Holless Wilbur Allen (July 12, 1909 – June 28, 1979) was an American bowyer, who invented the compound bow.

== Biography ==
Allen was born July 12, 1909, in Stilwell, Kansas. In the 1960s, he sawed the ends off a conventional recurve bow and then added pulleys to each end. Allen experimented with a number of designs to apply for a patent on June 23, 1966, and U.S. patent 3,486,495 was granted to him in December 1969. With the help of bowmaker Tom Jennings, he became the first manufacturer of compound bows. Of the five bow manufacturing companies to retain the right to manufacture compound bows utilizing Allen's design and patent, PSE (Precision Shooting Equipment) is the only survivor. PSE is the parent company of Browning Archery and the former Archery Research (AR).

Allen lived in Kansas City, Missouri. He moved to Billings, Missouri in 1967. He died on June 28, 1979, as the results of injuries suffered in a car accident.

== Recognition & awards ==
- Archery Hall of Fame & Museum: Class of 2010 Inductee, Innovator, Inventor, Contributor to the Sport
