= South Galloway Township, Christian County, Missouri =

Township in Christian County, Missouri, U.S.

Coordinates: 36°51′21″N 93°16′14″W

South Galloway Township is a township in Christian County, in the U.S. state of Missouri.

South Galloway Township was named for the old Galloway family.
