= West Benton Township, Christian County, Missouri =

Township in Christian County, Missouri, U.S.

Coordinates: 37.06109°N 93.03175°W

West Benton Township is a township in northeastern Christian County, Missouri.

The organization date and origin of the name of West Benton Township is unknown.

== Events ==
In 2024 up to 40 water lines were found to have lead leakage into the water.

The township is planning to add 2 new water storage tanks and fix the leaded water lines by 2026. The township received funding through the American Rescue Plan Act.
