= Nixa, Missouri =

- City
- Flag Seal

- Location of Nixa, Missouri
- Coordinates: 37°2′43″N 93°17′56″W
- Country: United States
- State: Missouri
- County: Christian

Government
  - Mayor: Jarad W. Giddens

Area
  - Total: 9.30 sq mi (24.09 km^{2})
  - Land: 9.30 sq mi (24.08 km^{2})
  - Water: 0.0039 sq mi (0.01 km^{2})
- Elevation: 1,296 ft (395 m)

Population (2020)
  - Total: 23,257
  - Density: 2,501.5/sq mi (965.83/km^{2})
- Time zone: UTC-6 (Central (CST))
  - Summer (DST): UTC-5 (CDT)
- ZIP code: 65714
- Area code: 417
- FIPS code: 29-52616
- GNIS feature ID: 0723380
- Website: www.nixa.com

Nixa is a city in Christian County, Missouri, United States. As of the 2020 census, the city's population was 23,257. It is a principal city, and the second-largest city in the Springfield, Missouri metropolitan area.

== History ==
Flag of Nixa in use from 2017 to 2023

The area was first settled by farmers who located their farms along the wooded streams near present-day Nixa. The area became a crossroads, as it was a half-day ride with a team of horses from Springfield. Teamsters found it a convenient stopover site when hauling freight between Springfield and Arkansas. The village became known as Faughts.

An early resident, Nicholas A. Inman, was a blacksmith from Tennessee, who set up a shop in 1852. When a post office was opened, a town meeting was held to decide on a name for the new community. Because of his years of service to the community, the town was suggested to be named for him. Another suggestion was "nix" because the community was "nothing but a crossroads". The name Nix was finally decided upon, and Inman's middle initial "a" was added to get the unique name of Nixa. The village incorporated in June 10, 1902, and was incorporated as a fourth-class city on June 7, 1946.

== Geography ==
Nixa is located at 37°2′43″N 93°17′56″W (37.045253, -93.298755). According to the United States Census Bureau, the city has a total area of 8.48 square miles (21.96 km^{2}), all land. The modern city rests on and around seven hills. It sits six miles south of Springfield, six miles west of Ozark, eight miles north of Highlandville and eight miles east of Clever.

== Demographics ==
Historical population
Census	Pop.	Note	%±
1910	276		—
1920	370		34.1%
1930	307		−17.0%
1940	370		20.5%
1950	509		37.6%
1960	994		95.3%
1970	1,636		64.6%
1980	2,662		62.7%
1990	4,707		76.8%
2000	12,124		157.6%
2010	19,022		56.9%
2020	23,257		22.3%
U.S. Decennial Census

=== Racial and ethnic composition ===
Nixa city, Missouri – racial and ethnic composition Note: the US Census treats Hispanic/Latino as an ethnic category. This table excludes Latinos from the racial categories and assigns them to a separate category. Hispanics/Latinos may be of any race.
Race / ethnicity (NH = Non-Hispanic)	Pop 2000	Pop 2010	Pop 2020	% 2000	% 2010	% 2020
White alone (NH)	11,697	17,625	20,228	96.48%	92.66%	86.98%
Black or African American alone (NH)	56	167	258	0.46%	0.88%	1.11%
Native American or Alaska Native alone (NH)	43	114	129	0.35%	0.60%	0.55%
Asian alone (NH)	50	152	269	0.41%	0.80%	1.16%
Pacific Islander or Native Hawaiian alone (NH)	2	11	33	0.02%	0.06%	0.14%
Other race alone (NH)	7	3	59	0.06%	0.00%	0.25%
Mixed-race or multiracial (NH)	116	355	1,401	0.96%	1.87%	6.02%
Hispanic or Latino (any race)	153	595	880	1.26%	3.13%	3.78%
Total	12,124	19,022	23,257	100.00%	100.00%	100.00%

=== 2020 census ===
As of the 2020 census, Nixa had a population of 23,257, 8,991 households, and 5,899 families. 99.5% of residents lived in urban areas, while 0.5% lived in rural areas.

The median age was 36.9 years; 26.7% of residents were under 18 and 16.8% were 65 or older. For every 100 females there were 91.0 males, and for every 100 females age 18 and over there were 86.4 males age 18 and over.

Of the 8,991 households, 37.2% had children under the age of 18 living in them. Of all households, 54.8% were married-couple households, 12.6% were households with a male householder and no spouse or partner present, and 26.6% were households with a female householder and no spouse or partner present. About 24.9% of all households were made up of individuals and 12.1% had someone living alone who was 65 years of age or older.

There were 9,364 housing units, of which 4.0% were vacant. The homeowner vacancy rate was 1.5% and the rental vacancy rate was 5.2%.

Racial composition as of the 2020 census
Race	Number	Percent
White	20,540	88.3%
Black or African American	262	1.1%
American Indian and Alaska Native	151	0.6%
Asian	277	1.2%
Native Hawaiian and Other Pacific Islander	33	0.1%
Some other race	293	1.3%
Two or more races	1,701	7.3%
Hispanic or Latino (of any race)	880	3.8%

=== 2016–2020 American Community Survey ===
The 2016–2020 five-year American Community Survey estimates show that the median household income was $63,176 (with a margin of error of +/- $4,286) and the median family income was $69,874 (+/- $4,707). Males had a median income of $41,770 (+/- $3,651) versus $26,480 (+/- $3,003) for females. The median income for those above 16 was $35,059 (+/- $3,052). About 6.1% of families and 8.2% of the population were below the poverty line, including 5.3% of those under 18 and 6.9% of those 65 or over.

=== 2010 census ===
As of the 2010 census, 19,022 people, 7,264 households, and 5,280 families lived in the city. The racial makeup of the city was 94.4% White, 0.9% African American, 0.7% Native American, 0.8% Asian, 0.1% Pacific Islander, 0.9% from other races, and 2.2% from two or more races. Hispanics or Latinos of any race were 3.1% of the population.

Of the 7,264 households, 41.6% had children under 18 living with them, 56.0% were married couples living together, 12.6% had a female householder with no husband present, 4.0% had a male householder with no wife present, and 27.3% were not families. About 22.8% of all households were made up of individuals, and 8.9% had someone living alone who was 65 or older. The average household size was 2.59 and the average family size was 3.03.

The median age in the city was 34.2 years; 28.8% of residents were under 18; 7.2% were between 18 and 24; 30.4% were from 25 to 44; 21.2% were from 45 to 64; and 12.3% were 65 or older. The gender makeup of the city was 47.4% male and 52.6% female.

=== 2000 census ===
As of the 2000 US Census, 12,124 people, 4,654 households, and 3,448 families resided in the city. The population density was 1,969.1 inhabitants per square mile (760.3/km^{2}). The 4,962 housing units averaged 805.9 per square mile (311.0/km^{2}). The racial makeup of the city was 97.43% White, 0.46% African American, 0.36% Native American, 0.43% Asian, 0.02% Pacific Islander, 0.30% from other races, and 1.01% from two or more races. Hispanics or Latinos of any race were 1.26% of the population.

Of the 4,654 households, 40.4% had children under 18 living with them, 58.3% were married couples living together, 12.4% had a female householder with no husband present, and 25.9% were not families. About 20.7% of all households were made up of individuals, and 7.6% had someone living alone who was 65 or older. The average household size was 2.56 and the average family size was 2.95.

In the city, the population was distributed as 28.4% under 18, 8.5% from 18 to 24, 34.5% from 25 to 44, 17.2% from 45 to 64, and 11.4% who were 65 or older. The median age was 32 years. For every 100 females, there were 89.2 males. For every 100 females age 18 and over, there were 84.9 males.

The median income for a household in the city was $37,655, and for a family was $44,556. Males had a median income of $33,636 versus $21,737 for females. The per capita income for the city was $17,774. About 8.1% of families and 9.7% of the population were below the poverty line, including 14.3% of those under age 18 and 6.7% of those age 65 or over.

== Education ==
The Nixa Public Schools district operates four elementary schools for students in kindergarten through fourth grade: Helen-Matthews Elementary, Espy Elementary, Century Elementary, and the newest, High Pointe Elementary (named because it sits on the highest elevation in Christian County), opened in August 2007. Two intermediate schools serve students in the fifth and sixth grades: Inman Intermediate and Summit Intermediate. One junior high school, Nixa Junior High, and one high school, Nixa Public High School are in the district. A magnet school, John Thomas School of Discovery, hosts kindergarten through sixth grade. Ozarks Technical Community college Richwood Valley Campus is in the Nixa zip code.

== Infrastructure ==
The city of Nixa began construction on the largest solar farm in Missouri in June 2017, which was completed and operational in November 2017. The solar farm has 33,288 solar panels located on 72 acres, and provides an estimated 9% of the city's power needs. Former Sen. Jay Wasson owns the land on which the solar farm is being built. The farm has a life expectancy of 25 years.

== Economy ==
Nixa is home to Accurate Plastics and another plastic service located nearby named Diversified Plastics. Nixa is home to a train part manufacturer, Snyders Equipment Company, a division of New York Air Brake. Also in the community is Aire-Master, a deodorizer brand that specializes in commercial applications, such as restroom air-freshener dispensers, Jordan Essentials, a magnesium product company, and Nixa Hardware, established in 1899.

In 2011, B&B Theatres built a cinema between Ozark and Nixa along Route 14.

== Politics ==
Nixa is part of Missouri's 7th congressional district.

A petition was submitted in June 2021 to set a recall election for Mayor Brian Steele. The Christian County Clerk certified enough valid signatures to trigger the recall election on November 2, 2021. The petition claimed that Steele should be recalled for abuse of emergency powers by enacting a mandatory mask mandate and other restrictions during the COVID-19 pandemic, which have since expired. The vote failed, with 75% of the vote going in favor of Steele.

== Annual Sucker Day ==
Finis Gold, mayor of Nixa, a barber and local American Legion commander, started the annual Nixa Sucker Day in 1957. It has been a longstanding tradition. Locals often close up shop or skip school for the day to go "grabbin’ for suckers". The fish are then frozen until enough are available for a big fish fry. The event is held annually during May. It is a family-friendly event held on Nixa's Main Street, with live entertainment and local crafts. Sucker fish and other kinds of food are sold by vendors. Proceeds from Sucker Day activities help fund local causes such as scholarships for graduates from Nixa High School, Project Graduation, and Nixa JROTC.

== Notable people ==
- Chase Allen, former NFL player, current UFL player
- William F. Austin, CEO of Starkey Hearing Technologies
- Dean Deetz, professional baseball pitcher
- Courtney Frerichs, middle-distance runner and Olympian
- Jim Kreider, served as speaker of the Missouri House of Representatives
- David Krol, professional bowler, winner of the 2026 USBC Masters
- Mickey Owen, professional baseball player and coach

== In popular culture ==
In the Robert Ludlum novels and films (fiction), Nixa is the birthplace of Jason Bourne/David Webb. The Bourne Supremacy revealed that Bourne's real name was David Webb and that he was born in Nixa, Missouri.

Several streets in a residential neighborhood northeast of downtown are named for performers on ABC-TV's Ozark Jubilee, including Nixa native Slim Wilson. They include Slim Wilson Boulevard, Red Foley Court, Zed Tennis Street, Bill Ring Court, Speedy Haworth Court, and Ozark Jubilee Drive. M

A 2013 episode of the Investigation Discovery television series Beauty Queen Murder featured a murder in Nixa. The 1985 death of Jackie Johns was not solved until 2010, when DNA evidence proved that fellow Nixa resident Gerald Carnahan had raped and murdered the young woman.

== Radio stations ==
- KGBX-FM
