= Stilwell, Kansas =

Unincorporated community in Johnson County, Kansas, United States

- Unincorporated community
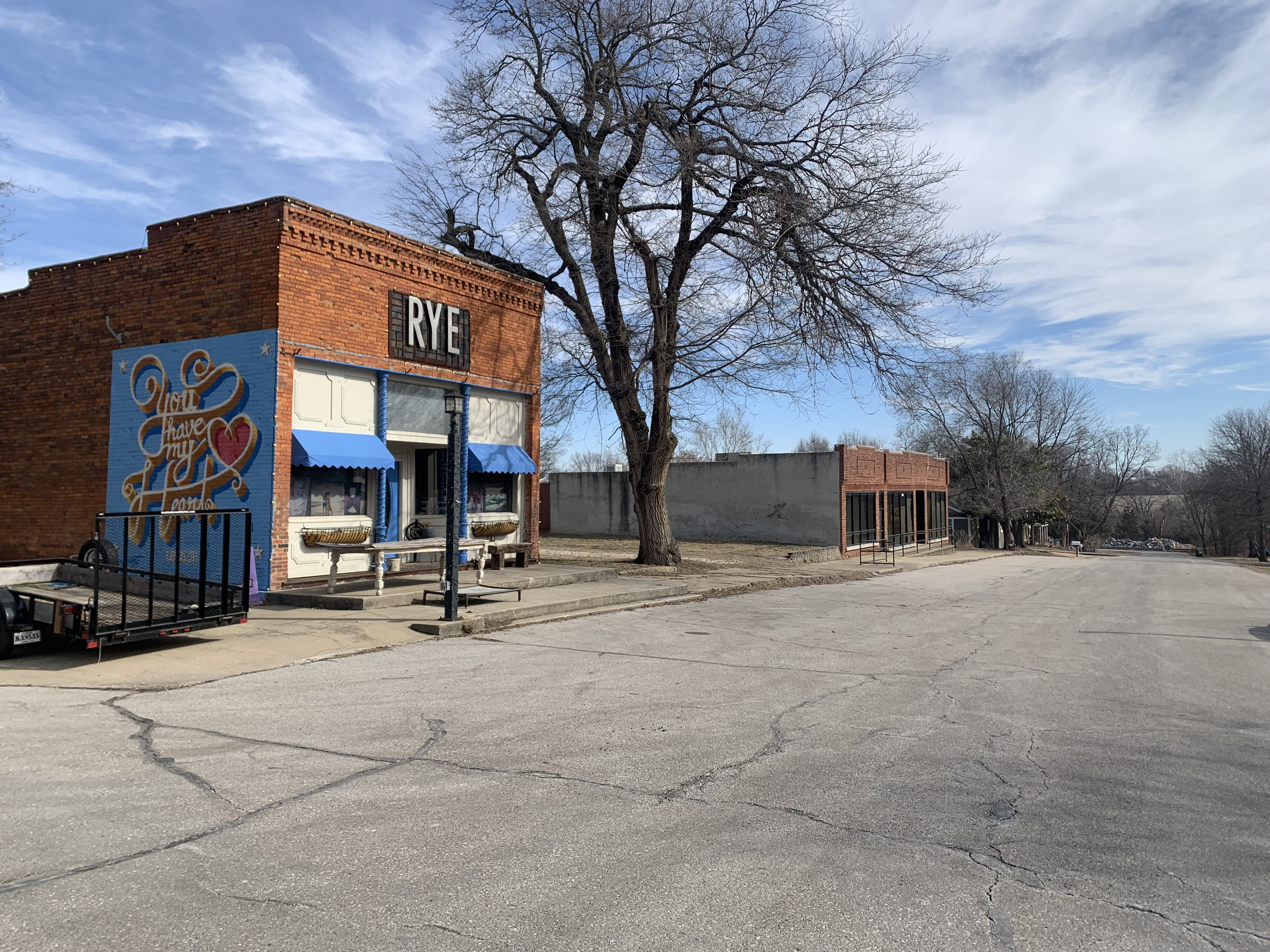
- Stilwell Old Downtown (2026)

- Location within Kansas Location within the United States
- Coordinates: 38°46′09″N 94°39′23″W
- Country: United States
- State: Kansas
- County: Johnson
- Platted: 1886
- Elevation: 1,066 ft (325 m)
- Time zone: UTC-6 (CST)
  - Summer (DST): UTC-5 (CDT)
- ZIP Code: 66085
- Area code: 913
- FIPS code: 20-68275
- GNIS ID: 479569

Stilwell is an unincorporated community in Aubry Township, Johnson County, Kansas, United States, and part of the Kansas City metropolitan area.

== History ==
Stilwell had its start when the Missouri Pacific Railroad began to plan to extend the railroad from Kansas City into the south. The railroad was initially planned to run through the town of Aubry, but due to the topography, the railroad decided to place the tracks a half mile to the east. This lead Michael O'Keefe, J. Larkin, W.A. Kelly, and A.J. Norman to file a plat for Mt. Auburn in 1886, which would eventually become Stilwell. The first post office in Stilwell was established in June 1888 and the population of Aubry eventually declined. It was renamed to Stilwell in 1889. Like many towns along the line to the Gulf of Mexico, it is named for Arthur Stilwell, founder of what became the Kansas City Southern Railroad.

Stilwell has affordable land and some farms are abandoned; however the large suburban population growth of Overland Park, Kansas increased the demand for new neighborhoods, raising the land value in some areas.

== Geography ==
=== Climate ===
The climate in this area is characterized by hot, humid summers and generally mild to cool winters. According to the Köppen Climate Classification system, Stilwell has a humid subtropical climate, abbreviated "Cfa" on climate maps.

== Notable people ==
- Holless Allen (1909–1979), inventor of the compound bow
- Gary Burrell (1937–2019), engineer and entrepreneur, co-founder of Garmin GPS technology company
- Tara Cunningham, Gold Medalist in Women's Weightlifting at 2000 Summer Olympics
- Michael Stevens, host of the YouTube channel Vsauce
- Tom Watson, American professional golfer
