= Porter Township, Christian County, Missouri =

Township in Christian County, Missouri, U.S.

Coordinates: 37°02′29″N 93°17′36″W

Porter Township is a defunct township in Christian County, Missouri. It was established in 1860 and was named after Joseph Porter, a Porter citizen.
