= Garrison Township, Christian County, Missouri =

Township in Christian County, Missouri, U.S.

Coordinates: 36°51′15″N 93°00′55″W

Garrison Township is an inactive township in Christian County, Missouri. A post office with the same name was established in 1887, named after a family of Garrisons. A school with the same name had its name transferred from either the township or the post office.
