= Finley Creek =

Stream in Missouri, U.S.

Location
- Country: United States
- State: Missouri
- Counties: Christian, Webster and Stone

Physical characteristics
- Source
  - coordinates: 37°06′55″N 92°41′50″W
- Mouth
  - location: James River in Stone County
  - coordinates: 36°57′54″N 93°21′46″W
  - elevation: 1,020 ft (310 m)
- Discharge
  - location: Riverdale, MO
  - average: 281 cu/ft. per sec.

Basin features
- Tributaries
  - left: Stewart Creek
  - right: Pedelo Creek, Parched Corn Creek

Finley Creek (also known as Finely River) is a stream in the Ozarks in Stone, Christian, and Webster counties southern Missouri, United States.

== Description ==
The headwaters of the Finley are in Webster County southeast of Seymour. The stream flows west-southwest into Christian County, through Ozark and into the northeast corner of Stone County to its confluence with the James River at the old townsite of Jamesville. The Finley is bridged by Missouri Route 125 at Linden, Missouri Route 14 and US Route 65 in Ozark, and US Route 160 southwest of the old Riverdale dam.

Some say Finley Creek was named after John Finley, who accompanied Daniel Boone to Kentucky in 1769. Others contend that the pair didn’t meet until after Finley had left Kentucky. The creek is also rumored to be named after James Finley, an early hunter.

== See also ==
- List of rivers of Missouri
