= Chase Allen (tight end) =

American football player (born 1997)

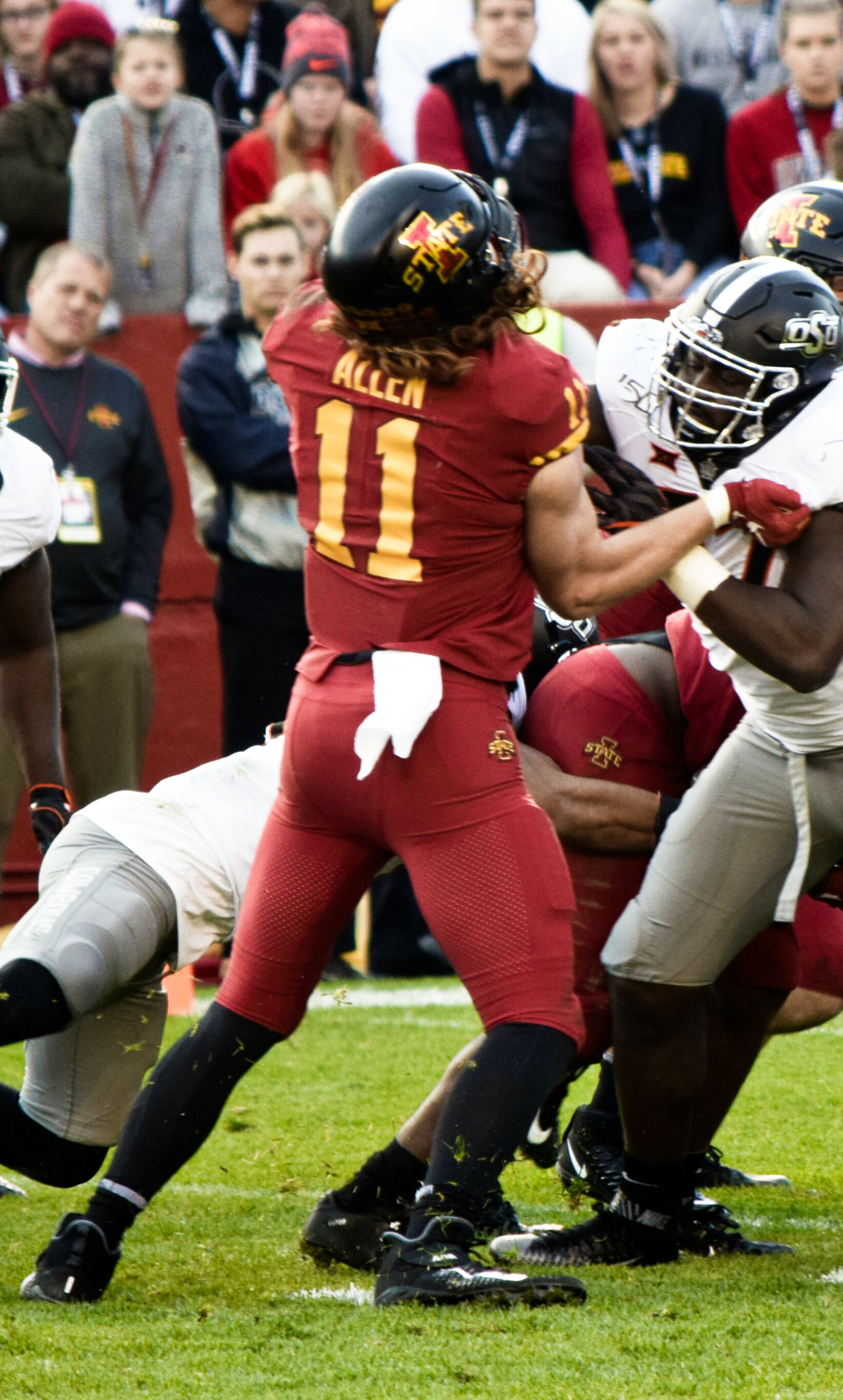
- Allen at Iowa State

No. 87
- Position: Tight end

Personal information
- Born: July 9, 1997 (age 29)
- Listed height: 6 ft 6 in (1.98 m)
- Listed weight: 251 lb (114 kg)

Career information
- High school: Nixa Public (Nixa, Missouri)
- College: Iowa State (2016–2021)
- NFL draft: 2022: undrafted

Career history
- Chicago Bears (2022); St. Louis Battlehawks (2025)

Awards and highlights
- 4× Second team All-Big 12 (2017, 2019–2021)
- Stats at Pro Football Reference

Chase Allen (born July 9, 1997) is an American former professional football tight end. He played college football at Iowa State.

== Early life ==
Allen grew up in Nixa, Missouri and attended Nixa Public High School. He was named first team All-State as a senior after finishing the season with 33 receptions for 654 yards and seven touchdowns. Allen committed to play college football at Iowa State over offers from Nebraska, Michigan, Missouri, and Minnesota. The son of Terry Allen, a head coach at Northern Iowa, Kansas, and Missouri State, Chase gained notoriety in high school when he was shown on national television crying at the end of North Carolina's loss to Kansas in the 2013 NCAA Men's Division I Basketball Tournament.

== College career ==
Allen was a member of the Iowa State Cyclones for six seasons. He redshirted his true freshman season while recovering from injuries suffered after being hit by a car shortly before his first year at Iowa State. Allen played in all 13 of Iowa State's games with nine starts during his redshirt freshman season and was named second-team All-Big 12 Conference primarily on his blocking ability. He played in eight games while missing five due to injury as a redshirt sophomore and caught eight passes for 84 yards.

As a redshirt junior, Allen played in all 13 of the Cyclones' games and had 17 receptions for 167 yards and two touchdowns and was again named second team All-Big 12. He repeated as a second team all-conference after catching 19 passes for 236 yards and two touchdowns in his redshirt senior season. Allen used the extra year of eligibility granted to college athletes in 2020 due to the COVID-19 pandemic and returned to Iowa State for a sixth year. In his final season, he caught 26 passes for 284 yards and two touchdowns and was named second team All-Big 12 for a fourth time.

== Professional career ==
Pre-draft measurables
Height	Weight	Arm length	Hand span	Wingspan	40-yard dash	10-yard split	20-yard split	20-yard shuttle	Three-cone drill	Vertical jump	Broad jump	Bench press
6 ft 6 in (1.98 m)	251 lb (114 kg)	34 1/8 in (0.87 m)	9 5/8 in (0.24 m)	6 ft 10 1/2 in (2.10 m)	4.79 s	1.62 s	2.74 s	4.43 s	7.03 s	36.5 in (0.93 m)	9 ft 9 in (2.97 m)	11 reps
All values from NFL Combine/Pro Day

Allen signed with the Chicago Bears as an undrafted free agent on April 30, 2022. He was waived during final roster cuts on August 30, 2022, but was signed to the team's practice squad the next day. He signed a reserve/future contract on January 9, 2023. He was waived on August 5, 2023.

=== St. Louis Battlehawks ===
On November 6, 2024, Allen signed with the St. Louis Battlehawks of the United Football League (UFL).

=== Coaching Career ===
After being unsigned for the 2026 UFL season, Allen joined Penn State as a offensive quality control coach for the Penn State Football Team.
