= Seneca Township, Christian County, Missouri =

Township in Christian County, Missouri, U.S.

Coordinates: 36.85365°N 92.93542°W

Seneca Township is a township in southeastern Christian County, Missouri.

The organization date and origin of the name of Seneca Township is unknown.
