= Oldfield, Missouri =

Unincorporated community in Missouri, U.S.

- Unincorporated community
- Location in the states of Missouri Oldfield (the United States)
- Coordinates: 36°58′42″N 93°02′25″W
- Country: United States
- State: Missouri
- County: Christian County
- Elevation: 421 m (1,381 ft)
- Time zone: UTC-6 (CST)
  - Summer (DST): UTC-5 (CDT)

Oldfield is an unincorporated community in Christian County, Missouri, United States. It is located 2.6 miles (4.2 km) southeast of Sparta at the intersection of Route 125 and Route T. Chadwick lies 3.2 miles (5.1 km) to the southeast on Route 125. The elevation is 1,381 feet. The community is part of the Springfield, Missouri Metropolitan Statistical Area.

Oldfield got rail service when a subsidiary of the St. Louis–San Francisco Railway (Frisco) extended a line from Ozark, Missouri, to Chadwick, Missouri, in the Spring of 1883. But Passenger service on the Frisco line was discontinued in March 1933, and in 1934 the line from Ozark to Chadwick was abandoned entirely.

Oldfield is home to the Oldfield Opry, a weekly country music show operated on a donations only basis. The show is held every Saturday night, and people come from miles around to listen to the classic country and western style music.
