= William P. Sullivan =

American politician

William P. Sullivan (June 3, 1870 in Wisconsin – April 1925 in Billings, Missouri) was an attorney and a member of the Missouri House of Representatives and the Missouri Senate.

== Career ==
Sullivan was a member of the House of Representatives from 1899 to 1900 and of the Senate from 1901 to 1905. Additionally, he was a delegate to the Republican National Convention in 1908 and 1916.

In 1905, he was convicted of accepting a bribe while serving as State Senator, and fined $100.
