= Nixa Public Schools =

School district in Missouri, U.S.

Coordinates: 37°03′04″N 93°17′35″W

Location
- 301 S Main Street; Nixa, Missouri; 65714 United States

District information
- Type: Public school district
- Motto: Excellence, In action.
- Grades: PreK - 12
- Established: 1889
- Superintendent: Dr. Gearl Loden
- Accreditation: R-I2
- Budget: $62 million/yr (payroll-$40.3 million/yr

Students and staff
- Students: 6,11 2
- Staff: 697
- Athletic conference: Central Ozark Conference (COC) Large

Other information
- Website: Official website

Nixa Public Schools operates four elementary schools for students in kindergarten through fourth grade: Mathews, Espy, Century, and the newest, High Pointe (named so because it sits on the highest elevation in Christian County), opened in August 2007. Also, two intermediate schools serve students in the fifth and sixth grades—Inman and Summit; one junior high school and one high school, are in the district. Also, a magnet school hosts kindergarten through 6th grade – John Thomas School of Discovery.

The Nixa school district is widely considered one of the best in Missouri, receiving the Missouri Department of Elementary and Secondary Education's Distinction in Performance Award for each of the last five years. In its Missouri Assessment Program, Nixa Junior High placed fifth in the state in science, eighth in math, and 18th in English. The high school was ranked fourth in the state for high academic performance.

== History ==
In the 1800s when most schools in the United States were first starting to become established, there were 84 to 103 one-room schoolhouses scattered throughout Christian County. These schoolhouses generally served 20 to 35 students who usually walked to school. These schools also had one teacher who wore many hats, such as instructor, custodian, and disciplinarian.

When the Nixa School District was formed in 1899, there was no school board, no teacher, no school building, or even land to build one. In 1901, Nixa's first school for all grades was built. Local history says that Walter Keltner, the president of Nixa's first Board of Education, purchased the land for the school and gave it to the school district.

In the past 100 years, the Nixa Public School system has grown dramatically. Once only had a one-room schoolhouse, now 12 separate buildings. The first year, had four students graduates in the two-year high school in 1908. In 2017 Nixa had 1,685 students in the high school. Nixa has grown from the original total enrollment of 149 students in 1926 to 6,122 in 2017. Nixa Public Schools has indeed come a long way from its established date in 1899.

In addition to providing a basic education to the children of Nixa, the Nixa Public School system serves as a social and cultural center. It is a place for sports, theatre, music, and other civic activities. Not only does Nixa Public Schools meet the educational needs of a community, it is a source of employment for the people of Nixa, and surrounding communities, as well. Nixa Public Schools enable each student to pursue excellence so they can become a productive, contributing member of society.

=== Faught Administration Center ===
The old Main Street Elementary School building has become an administrative building, named Faught Administration Center.

== Schools ==
=== High school ===
- Nixa High School, (Including a Career Opportunities Center "The COC")

=== Junior High school ===
- Nixa Junior High

=== Intermediate schools ===
- Inman Intermediate
- Summit Intermediate

=== Elementary schools ===
- John Thomas School Of Discovery (Magnet K-6)
- Helen-Mathews Elementary
- Espy Elementary
- Century Elementary
- High Pointe Elementary

=== Preschools ===
- Nixa Early Childhood Center
