= Chadwick Township, Christian County, Missouri =

Township in Christian County, Missouri, U.S.

Coordinates: 36°55′04″N 93°02′14″W

Chadwick Township is an inactive township in Christian County, Missouri. It was named after a railroad official when the railroad came through in 1883.
