= Sparta R-III School District =

School district in Missouri, U.S.

Address
- 217 Division Street Sparta, Missouri, 65753; United States

District information
- Type: Public
- Grades: PreK–12
- NCES District ID: 2928740

Students and staff
- Students: 743
- Teachers: 52.43
- Staff: 55.57
- Student–teacher ratio: 14.17

Other information
- Website: www.spartaschools.net

Sparta R-III School District is a public school district in Sparta, Missouri, United States.

In November, 2009, voters approved two bond issues to finance construction of an $8 million high school. The high school was completed in late 2011.

== Sports ==
From 2002 to 2004, the boys' baseball and basketball teams won district and conference championships. In 2003, the boys' baseball team took first place at the Missouri State High School Activities Association (MSHSAA) Class 1A State Championship.

In 2006 and 2007, the softball team went undefeated and won the SouthWest Central League (SWCL) conference championship. In 2006, the boys' track team captured the SWCL championship.

In 2008, the volleyball team defeated New Covenant School for the Class 1 District 6 championship, which began a streak of four straight district championships. The 2008 boys' cross country team qualified for the state championships for the first time in ten years.

In 2008, the girls' basketball team finished 31–0 and captured the Girls' Class 2 State Championship. In 2009, the same team captured their second straight district championship.

In 2011 the boys' cross country team won second place at the state championships.
