= Chadwick, Missouri =

Unincorporated community in Missouri, U.S.

Coordinates: 36°55′48″N 93°03′25″W

Chadwick is an unincorporated community in eastern Christian County, Missouri, United States. The total population of Chadwick Township per the 2020 census was 403. It is located approximately six miles southeast of Sparta along Missouri Route 125. The community of Oldfield is approximately three miles to the north along Route 125. It is part of the Springfield, Missouri Metropolitan Statistical Area. Its ZIP code is 65629.

Chadwick is located in the hills of the Ozarks along the south edge of the Springfield Plateau. It sits on a ridge between the East Fork of Bull Creek to the west and Swan Creek to the east.

== History ==
A post office has been in operation at Chadwick since 1883. The town had its start that year when a subsidiary of the St. Louis–San Francisco Railway (Frisco) laid rails from Ozark, Missouri into Chadwick. The community was named for an official of the Frisco. But passenger service on the Frisco line was discontinued in March 1933, and in 1934 the line from Ozark to Chadwick was abandoned entirely.

== Recreation ==
The Chadwick Motorcycle & ATV Use Area of the Mark Twain National Forest, just to the southwest of town, offers nearly 80 miles of multi-use bike trails which wind in and out of deep, forested hollows and down long ridge tops.
