= Highlandville, Missouri =

- City
- Location of Highlandville, Missouri
- Coordinates: 36°56′34″N 93°17′11″W
- Country: United States
- State: Missouri
- County: Christian

Area
  - Total: 4.93 sq mi (12.76 km^{2})
  - Land: 4.92 sq mi (12.75 km^{2})
  - Water: 0.0077 sq mi (0.02 km^{2})
- Elevation: 1,381 ft (421 m)

Population (2020)
  - Total: 963
  - Density: 195.7/sq mi (75.55/km^{2})
- Time zone: UTC-6 (Central (CST))
  - Summer (DST): UTC-5 (CDT)
- ZIP code: 65669
- Area code: 417
- FIPS code: 29-32068
- GNIS feature ID: 0735649
- Website: www.highlandvillemo.com

Highlandville is a city in Christian County, Missouri, United States. The population was 963 at the 2020 census. It is part of the Springfield, Missouri Metropolitan Statistical Area.

== History ==
A post office called Highlandville has been in operation since 1872. The city was named on account of its lofty elevation.

== Geography ==
Highlandville is located at 36°56′34″N 93°17′11″W (36.942690, −93.286447).

According to the United States Census Bureau, the city has a total area of 5.03 square miles (13.03 km^{2}), of which 5.02 square miles (13.00 km^{2}) is land and 0.01 square miles (0.03 km^{2}) is water.

== Demographics ==
Historical population
Census	Pop.	Note	%±
1940	76		—
2000	872		—
2010	911		4.5%
2020	963		5.7%
U.S. Decennial Census

=== 2010 census ===
At the 2010 census, there were 911 people, 348 households and 259 families living in the city. The population density was 181.5 inhabitants per square mile (70.1/km^{2}). There were 380 housing units at an average density of 75.7 per square mile (29.2/km^{2}). The racial makeup of the city was 97.4% White, 0.1% African American, 1.1% Native American, and 1.4% from two or more races. Hispanic or Latino of any race were 0.4% of the population.

There were 348 households, of which 33.9% had children under the age of 18 living with them, 58.3% were married couples living together, 10.9% had a female householder with no husband present, 5.2% had a male householder with no wife present, and 25.6% were non-families. 19.8% of all households were made up of individuals, and 7.5% had someone living alone who was 65 years of age or older. The average household size was 2.62 and the average family size was 2.98.

The median age was 38.7 years. 25.6% of residents were under the age of 18; 8.5% were between the ages of 18 and 24; 23.1% were from 25 to 44; 30.7% were from 45 to 64; and 12% were 65 years of age or older. The gender makeup of the city was 48.8% male and 51.2% female.

=== 2000 census ===
At the 2000 census, there were 872 people, 321 households and 248 families living in the city. The population density was 175.2 inhabitants per square mile (67.6/km^{2}). There were 347 housing units at an average density of 69.7 per square mile (26.9/km^{2}). The racial makeup of the city was 97.25% White, 1.03% Native American, 0.34% from other races, and 1.38% from two or more races. Hispanic or Latino of any race were 0.92% of the population.

There were 321 households, of which 38.0% had children under the age of 18 living with them, 58.9% were married couples living together, 14.6% had a female householder with no husband present, and 22.7% were non-families. 19.6% of all households were made up of individuals, and 5.6% had someone living alone who was 65 years of age or older. The average household size was 2.72 and the average family size was 3.10.

28.7% of the population were under the age of 18, 9.3% from 18 to 24, 32.0% from 25 to 44, 23.1% from 45 to 64, and 7.0% who were 65 years of age or older. The median age was 34 years. For every 100 females, there were 104.7 males. For every 100 females age 18 and over, there were 103.3 males.

The median household income was $31,767 and the median family income was $33,229. Males had a median income of $24,125 and females $20,682. The per capita income was $12,442. About 14.4% of families and 17.9% of the population were below the poverty line, including 25.2% of those under age 18 and 16.1% of those age 65 or over.

== Education ==
It is in the Spokane R-VII School District.
