= Nixa Public High School =

Nixa High School

Location
- 514 S Nicholas Rd; Nixa, Missouri 65714; United States; 37°1′57″N 93°19′32″W

Information
- Type: Public high school
- Established: 1908; 118 years ago
- School district: Nixa Public Schools
- Superintendent: Gearl Loden
- Principal: David Kelly
- Teaching staff: 114.04 (on an FTE basis) (2022–23)
- Grades: 9–12
- Enrollment: 1,975 (2022–23)
- Student to teacher ratio: 17.16 (2022–23)
- Campus type: suburban
- Colors: Red, White, and Grey
- Fight song: Michigan "The Victors"
- Athletics conference: Central Ozark Conference
- Team name: Eagles
- Rival: Ozark Tigers
- Publication: EagleAirTV
- Newspaper: Wingspan
- Yearbook: The Eagle
- Website: nixapublicschools.net/NHS

Nixa High School is a public high school in Nixa, Missouri, United States. Nixa High School received the National Blue Ribbon in 2013 and 2022. It was ranked 30th in the state and 1st in the Springfield metropolitan area by U.S. News & World Report in 2022. It is now ranked 19th in the state and 1st in the Springfield metropolitan area by U.S. News & World Report for 2023–2024.

== History ==
The first Nixa High School was established in 1908 and was a one-room schoolhouse. In 2000, the high school moved from the present day Nixa Junior High, (on Main Street), the new high school (on Nicholas Road).

In January 2022, Nixa High School officials reported that several soap dispensers had to be removed from the school's bathrooms after some students took them apart and urinated inside of them, and that they believed these actions were part of a TikTok challenge.

In 2024, several reports of bomb threats at local elementary schools closed the school for the remainder of the day.

== Extracurricular activities ==
=== Athletics ===
==== Overview ====
Nixa High School has Football, Marching Band, Softball, Volleyball, Basketball, Wrestling, Baseball, Track and Field, Golf, Swimming, Bowling, Cross Country, Soccer, Tennis, and Bass Fishing.

==== Football ====
The Nixa football team consists of three teams: Freshman, JV, and Varsity. In 2014, Nixa went to the Class 5 Football State Championship, but fell short by 3 points in a 25–22 loss to Battle High School. In early 2020, longtime coach Richard Rehagen retired as Nixa's football coach. Nixa then hired John Perry as their new head coach. Perry previously coached in Pearl, Mississippi, and led his team to that state's 6A championship in 2017.

Nixa was the Missouri Class 6 state runner-up in 2024, falling to DeSmet Jesuit 35–20. In 2025, they were again the runner-up in the Class 6 state championship to Lee's Summit by a score of 41-37.

Volleyball

The Nixa Lady Eagles Volleyball team won the Class 4 State Championship against Lafayette in 2019, and got second place in the Class 5 State Championship against Liberty North in 2020.

Girls and Boys Basketball

Boys Basketball won state in 1978 and 1999 while Girls Basketball won state in 2000 and 2009.

Wrestling

Nixa has had numerous wrestlers win state over the years.

=== Marching Band ===
The 220+ strong marching band boasts several awards of recognition. Including being a Bands of America Regional Finalist in Cedar Falls, lowa in 2019, winning the Kansas City Championships in Blue Springs, Missouri; and winning Missouri State University's Ozarko Marching Festival in 2009, and 2015. As well, Summer trips to Oahu, Washington D.C., Boston, San Francisco and more. The band is also called the "Nixa Crimson Corps" and uses that name for all of their current productions.

In 2024, controversy struck when the band used a zodiac sign on their uniforms. To much outcry from largely Christian groups on Facebook, the band was forced to abandon $2,000 worth of fabric, which were intended to mimic constellations.

The band also marches in local parades, including the Nixa Christmas Parade, and Nixa Sucker Days Festival.

=== Concert Bands ===
During the spring semester, the 220+ Nixa High School band divides into three concert large ensembles including Concert Band, Symphonic Band, and Wind Ensemble, and several smaller ensembles, including Percussion, and Jazz ensembles.

=== Theater ===
The Nixa Theater department performs two musicals per year.

FFA

In 2021, Nixa High School brought the FFA back to the school.

== Notable alumni ==
- Chase Allen – American football player (born 1997)
- Jackson Cantwell – American football player (born 2008)
- Courtney Frerichs – American middle-distance runner, steeplechase specialist (born 1993)
- Jim Kreider – American politician (born 1955)
