= Linden, Christian County, Missouri =

Unincorporated community in Missouri, U.S.

Coordinates: 37°02′49″N 93°08′02″W

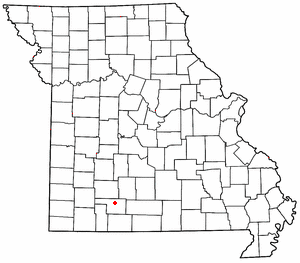

Linden is an unincorporated community in northern Christian County, Missouri United States. It is located approximately 4.5 miles northwest of Sparta on Route 125, where the highway crosses the Finley Creek. The river has been dammed, creating a small lake, Lake Lindenlure, just east of Route 125.

Linden is part of the Springfield, Missouri Metropolitan Statistical Area.

The community's name is a transfer from Linden, Tennessee. A variant name was "Kenton". A post office called Kenton was established in 1860, and remained in operation until 1911.
