= Billings, Missouri =

- City
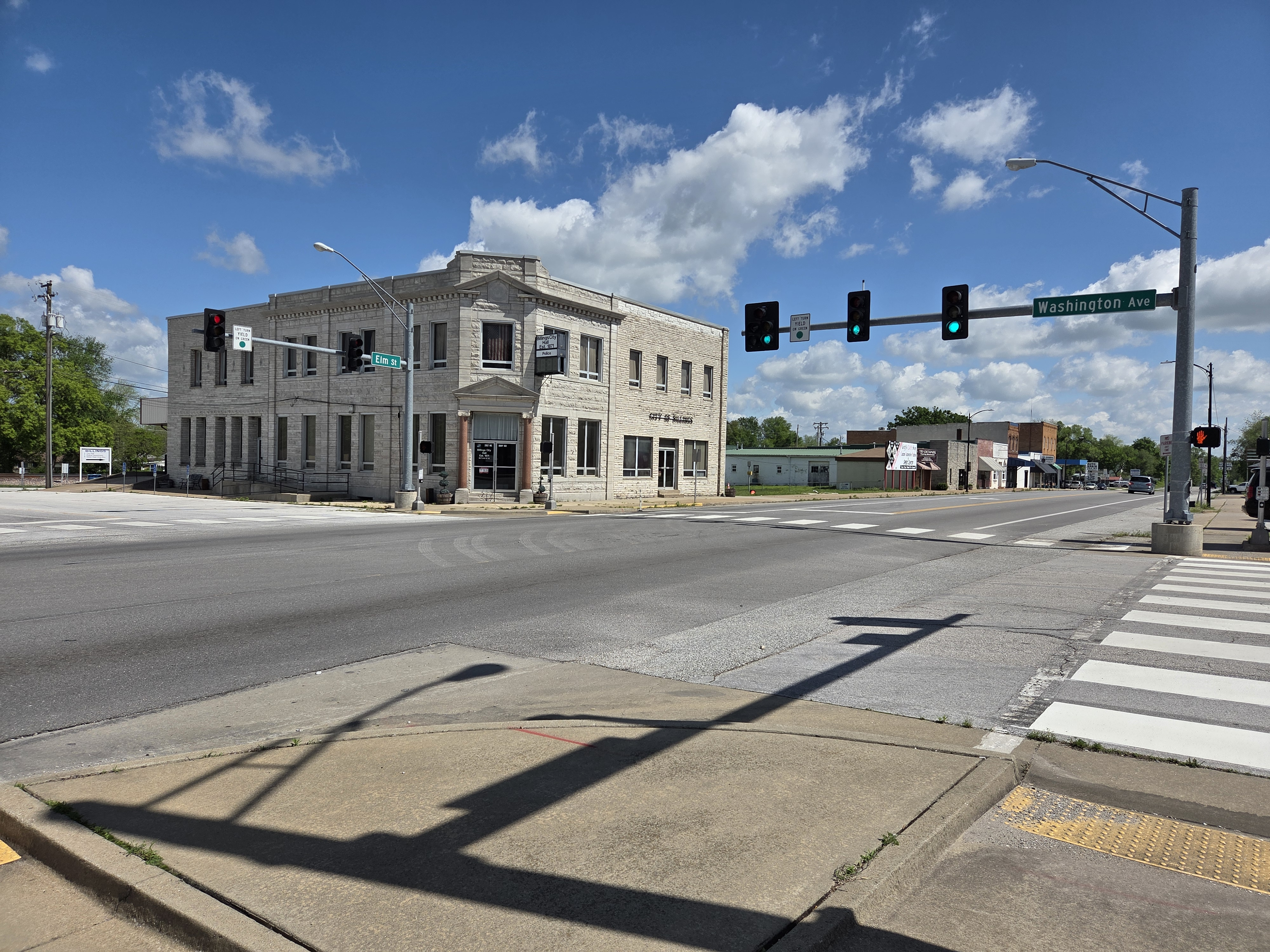
- Billings City Hall, along U.S. Route 60

- Location of Billings, Missouri
- Coordinates: 37°3′50″N 93°33′14″W
- Country: United States
- State: Missouri
- County: Christian

Area
  - Total: 0.98 sq mi (2.53 km^{2})
  - Land: 0.98 sq mi (2.53 km^{2})
  - Water: 0 sq mi (0.00 km^{2})
- Elevation: 1,368 ft (417 m)

Population (2020)
  - Total: 1,084
  - Density: 1,109.2/sq mi (428.26/km^{2})
- Time zone: UTC−06:00 (Central (CST))
  - Summer (DST): UTC−05:00 (CDT)
- ZIP code: 65610
- Area code: 417
- FIPS code: 29-05626
- GNIS feature ID: 0714237
- Website: billingsmo.com

Billings is a city in Christian County, Missouri, United States. As of the 2020 census, Billings had a population of 1,084. It is part of the Springfield, Missouri metropolitan area.

== History ==
Billings was platted in 1872. The community was named after railroad baron Frederick H. Billings, who helped build the town a church in exchange for the naming rights. A post office has been in operation at Billings since 1871.

== Geography ==
Billings is located at 37°3′50″N 93°33′14″W (37.064001, -93.553819).

According to the United States Census Bureau, the city has a total area of 0.89 square miles (2.31 km^{2}), all land.

=== Climate ===
Climate data for Billings, Missouri (1991–2020 normals, extremes 1962–present)
Month	Jan	Feb	Mar	Apr	May	Jun	Jul	Aug	Sep	Oct	Nov	Dec	Year
Record high °F (°C)	73 (23)	83 (28)	85 (29)	95 (35)	94 (34)	103 (39)	109 (43)	109 (43)	104 (40)	94 (34)	86 (30)	75 (24)	109 (43)
Mean daily maximum °F (°C)	44.6 (7.0)	49.8 (9.9)	59.0 (15.0)	68.8 (20.4)	76.4 (24.7)	84.9 (29.4)	89.6 (32.0)	89.3 (31.8)	82.0 (27.8)	70.4 (21.3)	58.0 (14.4)	47.6 (8.7)	68.4 (20.2)
Daily mean °F (°C)	33.2 (0.7)	37.6 (3.1)	46.2 (7.9)	55.7 (13.2)	64.9 (18.3)	73.7 (23.2)	78.1 (25.6)	77.1 (25.1)	69.6 (20.9)	57.5 (14.2)	45.9 (7.7)	36.6 (2.6)	56.3 (13.5)
Mean daily minimum °F (°C)	21.9 (−5.6)	25.4 (−3.7)	33.4 (0.8)	42.6 (5.9)	53.5 (11.9)	62.5 (16.9)	66.6 (19.2)	64.9 (18.3)	57.1 (13.9)	44.7 (7.1)	33.8 (1.0)	25.6 (−3.6)	44.3 (6.8)
Record low °F (°C)	−17 (−27)	−20 (−29)	−1 (−18)	15 (−9)	29 (−2)	41 (5)	47 (8)	44 (7)	35 (2)	17 (−8)	3 (−16)	−15 (−26)	−20 (−29)
Average precipitation inches (mm)	2.57 (65)	2.40 (61)	3.90 (99)	4.53 (115)	5.64 (143)	4.44 (113)	4.01 (102)	3.52 (89)	4.80 (122)	3.49 (89)	3.63 (92)	2.85 (72)	45.78 (1,163)
Average snowfall inches (cm)	4.7 (12)	2.5 (6.4)	0.9 (2.3)	0.2 (0.51)	0.0 (0.0)	0.0 (0.0)	0.0 (0.0)	0.0 (0.0)	0.0 (0.0)	0.1 (0.25)	0.5 (1.3)	3.0 (7.6)	11.9 (30)
Average precipitation days (≥ 0.01 in)	8.2	7.3	10.1	10.1	11.2	9.7	9.0	7.5	7.0	8.3	8.4	7.3	104.1
Average snowy days (≥ 0.1 in)	2.3	1.6	0.6	0.1	0.0	0.0	0.0	0.0	0.0	0.0	0.3	1.0	5.9
Source: NOAA

== Demographics ==
Historical population
Census	Pop.	Note	%±
1880	129		—
1890	464		259.7%
1900	702		51.3%
1910	760		8.3%
1920	614		−19.2%
1930	472		−23.1%
1940	452		−4.2%
1950	597		32.1%
1960	602		0.8%
1970	760		26.2%
1980	911		19.9%
1990	989		8.6%
2000	1,091		10.3%
2010	1,035		−5.1%
2020	1,084		4.7%
U.S. Decennial Census

=== 2010 census ===
As of the census of 2010, there were 1,035 people, 437 households, and 281 families living in the city. The population density was 1,162.9 inhabitants per square mile (449.0/km^{2}). There were 504 housing units at an average density of 566.3 per square mile (218.6/km^{2}). The racial makeup of the city was 96.8% White, 0.3% African American, 1.0% Native American, 0.2% Asian, 0.6% from other races, and 1.2% from two or more races. Hispanic or Latino of any race were 1.0% of the population.

There were 437 households, of which 33.0% had children under the age of 18 living with them, 43.9% were married couples living together, 13.0% had a female householder with no husband present, 7.3% had a male householder with no wife present, and 35.7% were non-families. 31.6% of all households were made up of individuals, and 15.6% had someone living alone who was 65 years of age or older. The average household size was 2.37 and the average family size was 2.90.

The median age in the city was 37.5 years. 26.5% of residents were under the age of 18; 8.6% were between the ages of 18 and 24; 24.5% were from 25 to 44; 23.4% were from 45 to 64; and 16.9% were 65 years of age or older. The gender makeup of the city was 45.1% male and 54.9% female.

=== 2000 census ===
As of the census of 2000, there were 1,091 people, 454 households, and 306 families living in the city. The population density was 1,400.0 inhabitants per square mile (540.5/km^{2}). There were 492 housing units at an average density of 631.4 per square mile (243.8/km^{2}). The racial makeup of the city was 98.26% European American, 0.37% African American, 0.55% Native American, and 0.82% from two or more races. Hispanic or Latino of any race were 0.09% of the population.

There were 454 households, out of which 33.7% had children under the age of 18 living with them, 50.9% were married couples living together, 12.1% had a female householder with no husband present, and 32.4% were non-families. 28.9% of all households were made up of individuals, and 15.0% had someone living alone who was 65 years of age or older. The average household size was 2.40 and the average family size was 2.95.

In the city the population was spread out, with 26.9% under the age of 18, 8.7% from 18 to 24, 27.8% from 25 to 44, 22.3% from 45 to 64, and 14.4% who were 65 years of age or older. The median age was 34 years. For every 100 females, there were 83.7 males. For every 100 females age 18 and over, there were 81.4 males.

The median income for a household in the city was $28,207, and the median income for a family was $34,861. Males had a median income of $24,615 versus $19,881 for females. The per capita income for the city was $16,503. About 14.1% of families and 15.1% of the population were below the poverty line, including 19.3% of those under age 18 and 24.4% of those age 65 or over.

== Notable people ==
- Holless Wilbur Allen, inventor of the compound bow
- Leon Rausch, vocalist with Bob Wills & The Texas Playboys
- William P. Sullivan, politician

== Notable events ==
- In 2012 Billings High School won the Missouri Class 2A boys basketball state championship.
