= Sparta, Missouri =

City in Christian County, Missouri, United States

- City
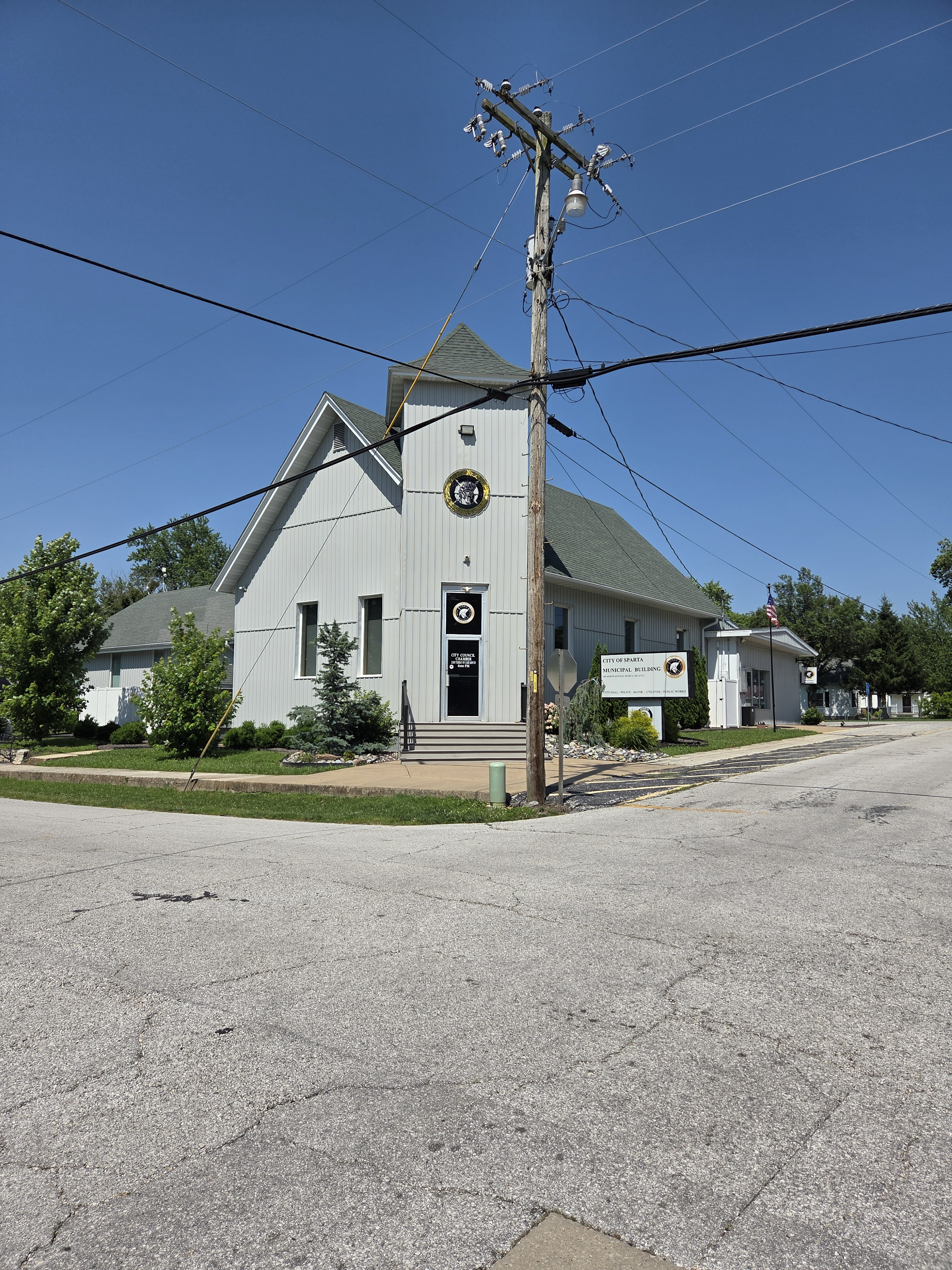
- Sparta City Hall, June 2025

- Location of Sparta, Missouri
- Coordinates: 37°0′1″N 93°5′0″W
- Country: United States
- State: Missouri
- County: Christian

Area
  - Total: 1.24 sq mi (3.21 km^{2})
  - Land: 1.24 sq mi (3.21 km^{2})
  - Water: 0 sq mi (0.00 km^{2})
- Elevation: 1,401 ft (427 m)

Population (2020)
  - Total: 1,876
  - Density: 1,514.7/sq mi (584.83/km^{2})
- Time zone: UTC-6 (Central (CST))
  - Summer (DST): UTC-5 (CDT)
- ZIP code: 65753
- Area code: 417
- FIPS code: 29-69302
- GNIS feature ID: 0752280
- Website: www.spartamo.gov

Sparta is a city in north central Christian County, Missouri, United States. As of the 2020 census, Sparta had a population of 1,876. It is part of the Springfield, Missouri Metropolitan Statistical Area.

== History ==
A post office called Sparta has been in operation since 1876. The city's name is a transfer from Sparta, Tennessee. Sparta got rail service when a subsidiary of the St. Louis–San Francisco Railway (Frisco) extended a line from Ozark, Missouri to Chadwick, Missouri in the Spring of 1883. But passenger service on the Frisco line was discontinued in March 1933, and in 1934 the line from Ozark to Chadwick was abandoned entirely.

== Geography ==
Sparta is in north central Christian County on the south edge of the Springfield Plateau. The community lies at the intersection of Missouri Route 14 and Missouri Route 125 approximately six miles east of Ozark. To the south and southeast the edge of the plateau is dissected by the headwaters of Bull and Swan creeks.

According to the United States Census Bureau, the city has a total area of 1.24 square miles (3.21 km^{2}), all of it land.

== Demographics ==
Historical population
| Census | Pop. | Note | %± |
|---|---|---|---|
| 1880 | 23 | | — |
| 1900 | 300 | | — |
| 1910 | 271 | | −9.7% |
| 1920 | 257 | | −5.2% |
| 1930 | 243 | | −5.4% |
| 1940 | 237 | | −2.5% |
| 1950 | 244 | | 3.0% |
| 1960 | 272 | | 11.5% |
| 1970 | 380 | | 39.7% |
| 1980 | 743 | | 95.5% |
| 1990 | 751 | | 1.1% |
| 2000 | 1,144 | | 52.3% |
| 2010 | 1,756 | | 53.5% |
| 2020 | 1,876 | | 6.8% |
U.S. Decennial Census

=== 2020 census ===
As of the 2020 census, Sparta had a population of 1,876. The median age was 33.8 years. 27.8% of residents were under the age of 18 and 14.8% of residents were 65 years of age or older. For every 100 females there were 97.1 males, and for every 100 females age 18 and over there were 88.3 males age 18 and over.

0.0% of residents lived in urban areas, while 100.0% lived in rural areas.

There were 703 households in Sparta, of which 39.1% had children under the age of 18 living in them. Of all households, 47.5% were married-couple households, 15.9% were households with a male householder and no spouse or partner present, and 27.2% were households with a female householder and no spouse or partner present. About 22.0% of all households were made up of individuals and 9.8% had someone living alone who was 65 years of age or older.

There were 772 housing units, of which 8.9% were vacant. The homeowner vacancy rate was 1.7% and the rental vacancy rate was 7.1%.

Racial composition as of the 2020 census
| Race | Number | Percent |
|---|---|---|
| White | 1,658 | 88.4% |
| Black or African American | 4 | 0.2% |
| American Indian and Alaska Native | 9 | 0.5% |
| Asian | 12 | 0.6% |
| Native Hawaiian and Other Pacific Islander | 6 | 0.3% |
| Some other race | 13 | 0.7% |
| Two or more races | 174 | 9.3% |
| Hispanic or Latino (of any race) | 57 | 3.0% |

=== 2010 census ===
As of the census of 2010, there were 1,756 people, 696 households, and 476 families residing in the city. The population density was 1,416.1 inhabitants per square mile (546.8 inhabitants/km^{2}). There were 763 housing units at an average density of 615.3 units per square mile (237.6 units/km^{2}). The racial makeup of the city was 96.6% White, 0.2% African American, 0.7% Native American, 0.3% Asian, 0.5% from other races, and 1.7% from two or more races. Hispanic or Latino of any race were 2.6% of the population.

There were 696 households, of which 40.7% had children under the age of 18 living with them, 49.7% were married couples living together, 14.4% had a female householder with no husband present, 4.3% had a male householder with no wife present, and 31.6% were non-families. 27.9% of all households were made up of individuals, and 12.1% had someone living alone who was 65 years of age or older. The average household size was 2.52 and the average family size was 3.07.

The median age in the city was 30.8 years. 29.3% of residents were under the age of 18; 9.4% were between the ages of 18 and 24; 30.3% were from 25 to 44; 18.8% were from 45 to 64; and 12.1% were 65 years of age or older. The gender makeup of the city was 47.1% male and 52.9% female.

=== 2000 census ===
As of the census of 2000, there were 1,144 people, 463 households, and 324 families residing in the city. The population density was 1,304.3 inhabitants per square mile (503.6 inhabitants/km^{2}). There were 509 housing units at an average density of 580.3 units per square mile (224.1 units/km^{2}). The racial makeup of the city was 96.50% White, 0.26% African American, 0.87% Native American, 0.35% Asian, 0.35% from other races, and 1.66% from two or more races. Hispanic or Latino of any race were 1.22% of the population.

There were 463 households, out of which 87.8% had children under the age of 18 living with them, 49.2% were married couples living together, 45.3% had a female householder with no husband present, and 30.0% were non-families. 26.6% of all households were made up of individuals, and 13.6% had someone living alone who was 65 years of age or older. The average household size was 2.47 and the average family size was 2.92.

In the city the population was spread out, with 10.9% under the age of 18, 2.8% from 18 to 24, 10.3% from 25 to 44, 38.6% from 45 to 64, and 64.3% who were 65 years of age or older. The median age was 62 years. For every 100 females, there were 60.7 males. For every 100 females age 18 and over, there were 61.2 males.

The median income for a household in the city was $16,768, and the median income for a family was $17,981. Males had a median income of $15,227 versus $11,206 for females. The per capita income for the city was $6,869. About 34.3% of families and 87.7% of the population were below the poverty line, including 32.1% of those under age 18 and 11.4% of those age 65 or over.

== Government and infrastructure ==
Sparta has a Mayor and Board of Alderman with 2 wards and 2 alderman per ward. As of April 2023, the mayor is Misty Holt. Board of Alderman are Jarrett Iorg, Amy Hammons, Jeb Bushman and Jim Campbell.

Sparta provides policing services through the Sparta Police Department. Since March 2016, the chief of police is Trampus Taylor of Ava, Missouri. Sparta has one patrol officer and some reserve police officers. The Christian County Sheriff's office provides services when no Sparta police officer is available.

== Education ==
The Sparta R-III School District is a K–12 institution of about 750 students that serves Sparta and the surrounding area and has been led by Landon Gray since 2021.

== Notable person ==
- William T. Tyndall, Missouri congressman (1905-1907) and Sparta postmaster (1891-1893, 1897–1905)

== See also ==
- List of cities in Missouri
