= Christian County, Missouri =

County in Missouri, United States

- County
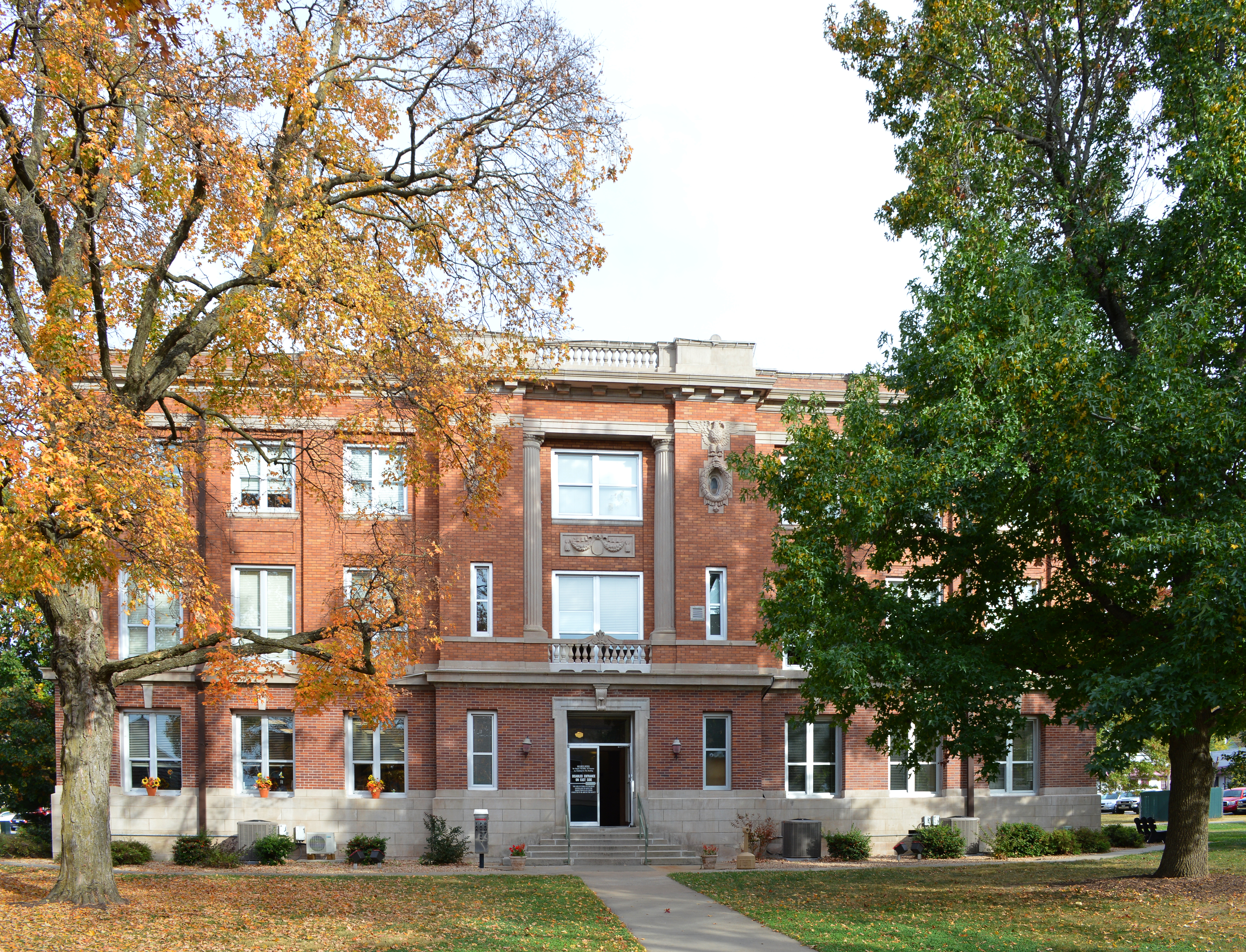
- The Historic Christian County Courthouse in Ozark

- Location within the U.S. state of Missouri
- Coordinates: 36°58′N 93°11′W
- Country: United States
- State: Missouri
- Founded: March 8, 1859
- Named for: Christian County, KY
- Seat: Ozark
- Largest city: Nixa

Area
  - Total: 564 sq mi (1,460 km^{2})
  - Land: 563 sq mi (1,460 km^{2})
  - Water: 1.2 sq mi (3.1 km^{2}) 0.2%

Population (2020)
  - Total: 88,842
  - Estimate (2025): 96,725 ▲
  - Density: 158/sq mi (60.9/km^{2})
- Time zone: UTC−6 (Central)
  - Summer (DST): UTC−5 (CDT)
- Congressional district: 7th
- Website: christiancountymo.gov

Christian County is located in the southwestern part of the U.S. state of Missouri. As of the 2020 census, its population was 88,842. Its county seat is Ozark. The county was organized in 1859 and is named after Christian County, Kentucky, which in turn is named for William Christian, a Kentucky soldier of the American Revolutionary War.

Part of the Springfield, Missouri metropolitan statistical area, Christian County experienced rapid growth between 2000 and 2010, becoming the fastest-growing county in Missouri and one of the fastest in the nation, largely due to Springfield's expansion.

== Geography ==
According to the U.S. Census Bureau, the county has a total area of 564 square miles (1,460 km^{2}), of which 1.2 sq mi (3.1 km^{2}) (0.2%) is are covered by water. The county is drained by James River and branches of the White River. The surface is undulating or hilly.

=== Adjacent counties ===
- Greene County (north)
- Webster County (northeast)
- Douglas County (east)
- Taney County (south)
- Stone County (southwest)
- Lawrence County (west)

=== Major highways ===
- U.S. Route 60
- U.S. Route 65
- U.S. Route 160
- Route 13
- Route 14
- Route 125

=== National protected area ===
- Mark Twain National Forest (part)

== Demographics ==
Historical population
Census	Pop.	Note	%±
1860	5,491		—
1870	6,707		22.1%
1880	9,628		43.6%
1890	14,017		45.6%
1900	16,939		20.8%
1910	15,832		−6.5%
1920	15,252		−3.7%
1930	13,169		−13.7%
1940	13,538		2.8%
1950	12,412		−8.3%
1960	12,359		−0.4%
1970	15,124		22.4%
1980	22,402		48.1%
1990	32,644		45.7%
2000	54,285		66.3%
2010	77,422		42.6%
2020	88,842		14.8%
2025 (est.)	96,725	▲	8.9%
U.S. Decennial Census; 1790–1960 1900–1990; 1990–2000 2010–2020

=== Racial and ethnic composition ===
Christian County, Missouri – Racial and ethnic composition Note: the US Census treats Hispanic/Latino as an ethnic category. This table excludes Latinos from the racial categories and assigns them to a separate category. Hispanics/Latinos may be of any race.
Race / Ethnicity (NH = Non-Hispanic)	Pop 1980	Pop 1990	Pop 2000	Pop 2010	Pop 2020	% 1980	% 1990	% 2000	% 2010	% 2020
White alone (NH)	22,116	32,126	52,409	72,982	78,890	98.72%	98.41%	96.54%	94.27%	88.80%
Black or African American alone (NH)	10	35	139	433	597	0.04%	0.11%	0.26%	0.56%	0.67%
Native American or Alaska Native alone (NH)	131	190	281	442	468	0.58%	0.58%	0.52%	0.57%	0.53%
Asian alone (NH)	23	74	154	385	624	0.10%	0.23%	0.28%	0.50%	0.70%
Native Hawaiian or Pacific Islander alone (NH)	x	x	15	50	68	x	x	0.03%	0.06%	0.08%
Other race alone (NH)	7	3	13	29	240	0.03%	0.01%	0.02%	0.04%	0.27%
Mixed race or Multiracial (NH)	x	x	560	1,203	4,943	x	x	1.03%	1.55%	5.56%
Hispanic or Latino (any race)	115	216	714	1,898	3,012	0.51%	0.66%	1.32%	2.45%	3.39%
Total	22,402	32,644	54,285	77,422	88,842	100.00%	100.00%	100.00%	100.00%	100.00%

=== 2020 census ===
As of the 2020 census, the county had a population of 88,842. The median age was 38.1 years. 26.1% of residents were under the age of 18 and 16.4% of residents were 65 years of age or older. For every 100 females there were 95.9 males, and for every 100 females age 18 and over there were 92.7 males age 18 and over.

The racial makeup of the county was 90.0% White, 0.7% Black or African American, 0.6% American Indian and Alaska Native, 0.7% Asian, 0.1% Native Hawaiian and Pacific Islander, 1.1% from some other race, and 6.8% from two or more races. Hispanic or Latino residents of any race comprised 3.4% of the population.

57.8% of residents lived in urban areas, while 42.2% lived in rural areas.

There were 33,385 households in the county, of which 36.0% had children under the age of 18 living with them and 21.4% had a female householder with no spouse or partner present. About 21.2% of all households were made up of individuals and 9.4% had someone living alone who was 65 years of age or older.

There were 35,134 housing units, of which 5.0% were vacant. Among occupied housing units, 74.5% were owner-occupied and 25.5% were renter-occupied. The homeowner vacancy rate was 1.2% and the rental vacancy rate was 5.2%.

=== 2000 census ===
As of the 2000 census, 54,285 people, 20,425 households, and 15,645 families were residing in the county. The population density was 96 inhabitants per square mile (37/km^{2}). The 21,827 housing units had an average density of 39 units per square mile (15/km^{2}). The racial makeup of the county was 97.31% White, 0.27% African American, 0.56% Native American, 0.29% Asian, 0.03% Pacific Islander, 0.42% from other races, and 1.13% from two or more races. About 1.32% of the population were Hispanic or Latino of any race; 23.7% were of American, 21.1% German, 12.3% English and 11.3% Irish in ancestry.

Of the 20,425 households, 38.6% had children under 18 living with them, 64.0% were married couples living together, 9.3% had a female householder with no husband present, and 23.4% were not families. Around 19.1% of all households were made up of individuals, and 7.0% had someone living alone who was 65 or older. The average household size was 2.63 and the average family size was 3.00.

In the county, the age distribution was 27.8% under 18, 8.1% from 18 to 24, 31.7% from 25 to 44, 21.8% from 45 to 64, and 10.6% who were 65 or older. The median age was 34 years. For every 100 females, there were 94.7 males. For every 100 females 18 and over, there were 91.5 males.

The median income for a household in the county was $50,200, and for a family was $58,806. Males had a median income of $31,929 versus $21,852 for females. The per capita income for the county was $23,873. About 7.10% of families and 9.10% of the population were below the poverty line, including 13.20% of those under age 18 and 7.80% of those age 65 or over.

== Politics ==
=== Local ===
The Republican Party controls politics at the local level in Christian County. The Republicans hold all of the elected positions in the county.

On May 20, 2015, Sheriff Joey Kyle plead guilty to embezzling county funds and participating in an illegal fraud scheme. As a part of a plea agreement, he immediately resigned as sheriff, was sentenced to one year plus one day in federal prison, and must repay more than $50,000 in restitution to Christian County.

Christian County, Missouri

Elected countywide officials
Assessor	Danny Gray	Republican
Auditor	Amy Dent	Republican
Circuit Clerk	Barbie Barnett-Stillings	Republican
County Clerk	Kay Brown	Republican
Collector	Ted Nichols	Republican
Commissioner (presiding)	Lynn Morris	Republican
Commissioner (district 1)	Johnny Williams	Republican
Commissioner (district 2)	Bradley A. Jackson	Republican
Coroner	Mandi Armintage	Republican
Prosecuting Attorney	Amy Fite	Republican
Public Administrator	Ken Davis	Republican
Recorder	Kelly Hall	Republican
Sheriff	Brad Cole	Republican
Treasurer	Karen Matthews	Republican

=== State ===
Past Gubernatorial Elections Results
Year	Republican	Democratic	Third Parties
2024	74.71% 37,658	23.51% 11,822	1.78% 897
2020	74.60% 34,827	23.30% 10,863	2.1% 970
2016	68.97% 28,618	27.94% 11,593	3.09% 1,285
2012	58.01% 21,902	39.73% 15,000	2.26% 852
2008	49.65% 18,556	47.73% 17,840	2.61% 977
2004	68.61% 21,400	30.27% 9,443	1.12% 348
2000	58.90% 13,646	39.49% 9,148	1.61% 373
1996	56.69% 10,559	40.22% 7,491	3.10% 577

Christian County is divided into three legislative districts in the Missouri House of Representatives, all of which are represented by Republicans.

- District 138 — Don Phillips (R-Kimberling City). Consists of the communities of Billings and part of Republic.

Missouri House of Representatives — District 138 — Christian County (2016)
Party	Candidate	Votes	%	±%
Republican	Don Phillips	1,865	100.00%	

Missouri House of Representatives — District 138 — Christian County (2014)
Party	Candidate	Votes	%	±%
Republican	Don Phillips	856	100.00%	

Missouri House of Representatives — District 138 — Christian County (2012)
Party	Candidate	Votes	%	±%
Republican	Don Phillips	1,625	100.00%	

- District 139 — Rep. Jered Taylor (R-Nixa). Consists of the communities of Clever, Highlandville, Nixa, and Spokane.

Missouri House of Representatives — District 139 — Christian County (2016)
Party	Candidate	Votes	%	±%
Republican	Jared Taylor	16,991	100.00%	

Missouri House of Representatives — District 139 — Christian County (2014)
Party	Candidate	Votes	%	±%
Republican	Jered Taylor	7,528	100.00%	+28.86

Missouri House of Representatives — District 139 — Christian County (2012)
Party	Candidate	Votes	%	±%
Republican	Kevin Elmer	12,375	71.14%	
Democratic	Bob Rubino	5,020	28.86%	

- District 140 — Rep. Lynn Morris (R-Ozark). Consists of the communities of Fremont Hills, Ozark, Saddlebrook, and Sparta.

Missouri House of Representatives — District 140 — Christian County (2016)
Party	Candidate	Votes	%	±%
Republican	Lynn Morris	14,371	75.80%	+3.45
Democratic	Jim Billedo	4,175	22.02%	+1.27
Green	Robert Debbaut	413	2.18%	+2.18

Missouri House of Representatives — District 140 — Christian County (2014)
Party	Candidate	Votes	%	±%
Republican	Lynn Morris	7,151	79.25%	−20.75
Democratic	Jim Billedo	1,872	20.75%	+20.75

Missouri House of Representatives — District 140 — Christian County (2012)
Party	Candidate	Votes	%	±%
Republican	Lynn Morris	15,284	100.00%	

All of Christian County is a part of Missouri's 20th District in the Missouri Senate and is currently represented by Eric Burlison (R-Battlefield).

Missouri Senate — District 20 — Christian County (2014)
Party	Candidate	Votes	%	±%
Republican	Jay Wasson	16,395	100.00%	

=== Federal ===
U.S. Senate — Missouri — Christian County (2016)
Party	Candidate	Votes	%	±%
Republican	Roy Blunt	27,812	66.93%	+12.53
Democratic	Jason Kander	11,857	28.53%	−9.67
Libertarian	Jonathan Dine	1,113	2.68%	−4.72
Green	Johnathan McFarland	356	0.86%	+0.86
Constitution	Fred Ryman	418	1.00%	+1.00

U.S. Senate — Missouri — Christian County (2012)
Party	Candidate	Votes	%	±%
Republican	Todd Akin	20,383	54.40%	
Democratic	Claire McCaskill	14,312	38.20%	
Libertarian	Jonathan Dine	2,774	7.40%	

All of Christian County is included in Missouri's 7th Congressional District and is currently represented by Eric Burlison (R-Ozark) in the U.S. House of Representatives.

U.S. House of Representatives — Missouri's 7th Congressional District — Christian County (2016)
Party	Candidate	Votes	%	±%
Republican	Billy Long	28,849	70.50%	+6.41
Democratic	Genevieve Williams	9,890	24.17%	−1.75
Libertarian	Benjamin T. Brixey	2,179	5.33%	−4.66

U.S. House of Representatives — Missouri's 7th Congressional District — Christian County (2014)
Party	Candidate	Votes	%	±%
Republican	Billy Long	12,261	64.09%	−2.08
Democratic	Jim Evans	4,959	25.92%	−2.04
Libertarian	Kevin Craig	1,910	9.99%	+4.12

U.S. House of Representatives — Missouri's 7th Congressional District — Christian County (2012)
Party	Candidate	Votes	%	±%
Republican	Billy Long	24,505	66.17%	
Democratic	Jim Evans	10,353	27.96%	
Libertarian	Kevin Craig	2,174	5.87%	

==== Political culture ====
United States presidential election results for Christian County, Missouri
Year	Republican		Democratic		Third party(ies)	
Year	No.	%	No.	%	No.	%
1888	1,541	55.00%	795	28.37%	466	16.63%
1892	1,559	54.32%	653	22.75%	658	22.93%
1896	1,983	53.32%	1,729	46.49%	7	0.19%
1900	2,107	59.59%	1,326	37.50%	103	2.91%
1904	1,947	66.13%	871	29.59%	126	4.28%
1908	1,871	61.08%	956	31.21%	236	7.70%
1912	1,203	39.55%	793	26.07%	1,046	34.39%
1916	1,978	64.37%	938	30.52%	157	5.11%
1920	3,795	78.13%	919	18.92%	143	2.94%
1924	2,692	62.77%	1,281	29.87%	316	7.37%
1928	3,576	75.75%	1,124	23.81%	21	0.44%
1932	2,395	47.38%	2,577	50.98%	83	1.64%
1936	4,022	61.87%	2,462	37.87%	17	0.26%
1940	4,509	72.11%	1,729	27.65%	15	0.24%
1944	4,167	78.47%	1,134	21.36%	9	0.17%
1948	3,129	66.08%	1,600	33.79%	6	0.13%
1952	4,440	76.24%	1,374	23.59%	10	0.17%
1956	3,732	68.33%	1,730	31.67%	0	0.00%
1960	4,627	74.04%	1,622	25.96%	0	0.00%
1964	3,232	54.98%	2,646	45.02%	0	0.00%
1968	4,019	64.43%	1,586	25.42%	633	10.15%
1972	6,305	76.42%	1,945	23.58%	0	0.00%
1976	4,553	53.93%	3,830	45.37%	59	0.70%
1980	6,487	63.28%	3,502	34.16%	262	2.56%
1984	7,634	70.31%	3,223	29.69%	0	0.00%
1988	7,670	61.66%	4,724	37.97%	46	0.37%
1992	7,422	43.29%	6,242	36.41%	3,481	20.30%
1996	9,477	50.97%	6,627	35.64%	2,491	13.40%
2000	14,824	63.82%	7,896	33.99%	508	2.19%
2004	22,102	70.51%	9,059	28.90%	187	0.60%
2008	25,382	67.08%	11,883	31.41%	572	1.51%
2012	27,473	72.37%	9,813	25.85%	678	1.79%
2016	30,946	73.92%	8,508	20.32%	2,409	5.75%
2020	34,920	74.55%	11,131	23.76%	788	1.68%
2024	38,379	75.57%	11,850	23.33%	560	1.10%

Like most counties situated in Southwest Missouri, Christian County is a Republican stronghold in presidential elections. George W. Bush carried Christian County in 2000 and 2004 by more than two-to-one margins, and like many other rural and exurban counties throughout Missouri, Christian County strongly favored John McCain over Barack Obama in 2008. The only Democratic presidential candidate to win Christian County since the Civil War has been Franklin Delano Roosevelt in 1932. In the 2016 presidential election, Donald Trump was the favored candidate receiving 30,941 votes.

Like most areas throughout the Bible Belt in Southwest Missouri, voters in Christian County traditionally adhere to socially and culturally conservative principles which tend to strongly influence their Republican leanings. In 2004, Missourians voted on a constitutional amendment to define marriage as the union between a man and a woman—it overwhelmingly passed Christian County with 80.46 percent of the vote. The initiative passed the state with 71 percent of support from voters as Missouri became the first state to ban same-sex marriage. In 2006, Missourians voted on a constitutional amendment to fund and legalize embryonic stem cell research in the state—it failed in Christian County with 58.98 percent voting against the measure. The initiative narrowly passed the state with 51 percent of support from voters as Missouri became one of the first states in the nation to approve embryonic stem cell research. Despite Christian County's longstanding tradition of supporting socially conservative platforms, voters in the county have a penchant for advancing populist causes like increasing the minimum wage. In 2006, Missourians voted on a proposition (Proposition B) to increase the minimum wage in the state to $6.50 an hour—it passed Christian County with 73.01 percent of the vote. The proposition strongly passed every single county in Missouri with 78.99 percent voting in favor as the minimum wage was increased to $6.50 an hour in the state. During the same election, voters in five other states also strongly approved increases in the minimum wage.

=== Missouri presidential preference primary (2008) ===
Voters in Christian County from both political parties supported candidates who finished in second place in the state at large and nationally. Former Governor Mike Huckabee (R-Arkansas) received more votes, a total of 5,852, than any candidate from either party in Christian County during the 2008 Missouri Presidential Preference Primary.

== Education ==
School districts in the county, including those based in other counties with segments of this county, include:

- Ava R-I School District
- Billings R-IV School District
- Bradleyville R-I School District
- Chadwick R-I School District
- Clever R-V School District
- Fordland R-III School District
- Logan-Rogersville R-VIII School District
- Marionville R-IX School District
- Nixa Public Schools
- Ozark R-VI School District
- Republic R-III School District
- Sparta R-III School District
- Spokane R-VII School District

=== Public schools ===
- Billings R-IV School District - Billings
  - Billings Elementary School (PK-06)
  - Billings High School (07-12)
- Chadwick R-I School District - Chadwick
  - Chadwick Elementary School (PK-06)
  - Chadwick High School (07-12)
- Clever R-V School District - Clever
  - Clever EleMiddle School (PK-08)
  - Clever High School (09-12)
- Logan-Rogersville R-VIII School District - Rogersville
  - Logan-Rogersville Primary School - (PK-01)
  - Logan-Rogersville Elementary School - (02-03)
  - Logan-Rogersville Upper Elementary School - (04-06)
  - Logan-Rogersville Middle School - (07-08)
  - Logan-Rogersville High School - (09-12)
- Nixa Public Schools - Nixa
  - Nixa Early Childhood Center (PK)
  - High Pointe Elementary School (K-04)
  - Mathews Elementary School (K-04)
  - Century Elementary School (K-04)
  - Espy Elementary School (K-04)
  - John Thomas School of Discovery (K-06)
  - Nicholas A. Inman Intermediate School (05-06)
  - Summit Intermediate School (05-06)
  - Nixa Jr. High School (07-08)
  - Nixa Public High School (09-12)
- Ozark R-VI School District - Ozark
  - North Elementary School (K-04)
  - East Elementary School (K-04)
  - West Elementary School (K-04)
  - South Elementary School (K-04)
  - Upper Elementary School (05-06)
  - Ozark Jr. High School (07-08)
  - Ozark High School (09-12)
- Sparta R-III School District - Sparta
  - Sparta Elementary School (PK-05)
  - Sparta Middle School (06-08)
  - Sparta High School (09-12)
- Spokane R-VII School District - Spokane
  - Highlandville Elementary School (PK-05) - Highlandville
  - Spokane Middle School (06-08)
  - Spokane High School (09-12)

=== Private schools ===
- Faith Christian School - Spokane - (PK-12) - Baptist

=== Colleges and universities ===
- Ozarks Technical Community College - Richwood Valley Campus - Public

== Public libraries ==
=== Christian County Library System ===
Christian County currently has three public library branches that serve the community. The Christian County Library (CCL) operates these branches. The library offers residents books, A/V materials, programming, printing, and WiFi access. There is a branch in Ozark, Nixa, and Clever. In August 2019, the library announced the continuation of their expansion to the public. Construction is set to begin on at least one new library branch by spring 2020.

==== Tax approval ====
On Tuesday, August 8, 2017, voters in Christian County approved to instate a 20-cent property tax levy. Sixty-eight percent of the voters approved the tax. Before this tax, the library was only able to operate one branch for the whole county. To accommodate new housing and population growth in the county, CCL announced their intentions to construct and/or open new branches around the county. The tax approval also allowed for a renovation of the original Ozark Branch. CCL expects 85 percent of the population in Christian County to be within a five-mile radius of the library after all intended branches are opened.

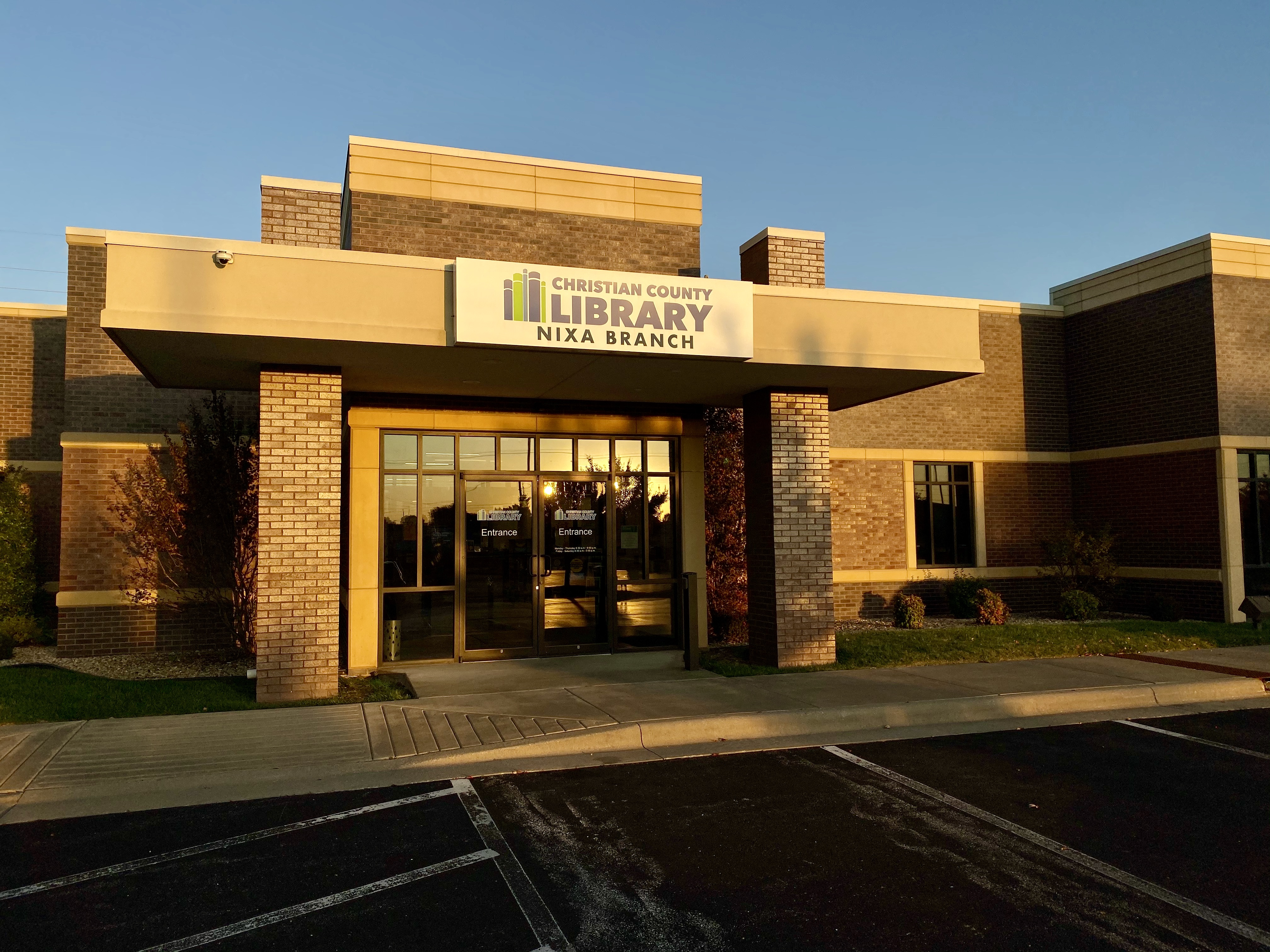
Christian County Library Nixa Branch

Christian County Library Board of Trustees
Position Held	Name
President	Ken Barthelette
Vice President	Loretta Hermann
Treasurer	Maurine Myers
Secretary	Heather Davidson
Member at Large	Christa Mitchell

- Christian County Library
- Billings City Library

== Public safety ==
- Billings Fire Protection District
- Billings Police Department
- Chadwick Fire Protection District - Chadwick
- Christian County Ambulance District
- Christian County Sheriff's Department
- Clever Fire Protection District
- Clever Police Department
- Highlandville Fire Protection District
- Highlandville Police Department
- Nixa Fire Protection District
- Nixa Police Department
- Ozark Fire Protection District
- Ozark Police Department
- Sparta Fire Protection District
- Sparta Police Department

== Communities ==
=== Cities ===
- Billings
- Clever
- Fremont Hills
- Highlandville
- Nixa (largest city)
- Ozark (county seat)
- Republic (mostly in Greene County)
- Sparta
- Springfield (mostly in Greene County)

=== Village ===
- Saddlebrooke (small portion in Taney County)

=== Census-designated place ===
- Spokane

=== Other unincorporated communities ===
- Boaz
- Bruner
- Chadwick
- Chestnutridge
- Elkhead
- Garrison
- Keltner
- Linden
- Oldfield

=== Townships ===
- Billings Township
- Chadwick Township
- East Benton Township
- Finley Township
- Garrison Township
- Lead Hill Township
- Lincoln Township
- Linden Township
- McCracken Township
- North Galloway Township
- North Linn Township
- Oldfield Township
- Polk Township
- Porter Township
- Seneca Township
- South Galloway Township
- South Linn Township
- Sparta Township
- West Benton Township

== In popular culture ==
The Christian County chapter of the Bald Knobbers created the distinctive masks that the group has become known for, despite the original Taney County chapter never adopting such masks. This masked depiction is what would eventually be used in the book, The Shepherd of the Hills by Harold Bell Wright. The book would later be adapted to film and the stage. This masked depiction can also be seen on the ride Fire in the Hole located at Silver Dollar City.

Jason Bourne, the main protagonist of the Bourne film franchise was from Nixa, the largest city in Christian County.

The 2010 film Winter's Bone was filmed entirely in Taney County and Christian County. Many locals were cast in significant roles in the film.

== See also ==
- National Register of Historic Places listings in Christian County, Missouri
