= Missouri Route 125 =

State highway in Missouri, U.S.

Route 125
- MO 125 highlighted in red

Route information
- Maintained by MoDOT
- Length: 83.556 mi (134.470 km)

Major junctions
- South end: AR 125 at the Arkansas state line near Protem
- US 160 in Rueter; US 60 west of Rogersville; I-44 in Strafford
- North end: US 65 / Route CC at Fair Grove

Location
- Country: United States
- State: Missouri

Highway system
- Missouri State Highway System; Interstate; US; State; Supplemental
← Route 124	→ Route 126

Route 125 runs between U.S. Route 65 at Fair Grove and the Arkansas state line, where it continues as Highway 125. After the road crosses into Marion County, Arkansas, the highway crosses Bull Shoals Lake via a free ferry. It is a two-lane road its entire length. Near Chadwick, the highway enters the Mark Twain National Forest and passes through this most of the way to Arkansas. It also overlaps U.S. Route 160 for several miles at Rueter. It overlaps Route 14 through most of Sparta. It crosses US 60 near Rogersville. It cross I-44 near Strafford, Missouri. The roads ends at U.S. Route 65 at Fair Grove and the road continues as Missouri Route CC.

From its northern terminus at Fair Grove the highway passes through eastern Greene County, northern and southeastern Christian County and eastern Taney County.

== Major intersections ==
County	Location	mi	km	Destinations	Notes
Taney		0.000	0.000	AR 125	Continuation into Arkansas
Taney		9.879	15.899	US 160 east	Southern end of US 160 overlap
Taney		11.829	19.037	US 160 west	Northern end of US 160 overlap
Taney		27.114	43.636	Route 76 west	Southern end of Route 76 overlap
Taney	Bradleyville	27.780	44.708	Route 76 east	Northern end of Route 76 overlap
Christian	Sparta	51.331	82.609	Route 14 east	Southern end of Route 14 overlap
Christian	Sparta	52.051	83.768	Route 14 west	Northern end of Route 14 overlap
Greene	Rogersville	62.053	99.865	US 60	Roundabout interchange
Greene	Strafford	73.955	119.019	I-44	I-44 exit 88
Greene	Fair Grove	83.556	134.470	US 65 / Route CC	Interchange; Roadway continues as Route CC
1.000 mi = 1.609 km; 1.000 km = 0.621 mi: Concurrency terminus
