= U.S. Route 65 in Missouri =

U.S. Highway segment in Missouri

U.S. Route 65
- US 65 highlighted in red

Route information
- Maintained by MoDOT
- Length: 313.114 mi (503.908 km)

Major junctions
- South end: US 65 at the Arkansas state line in Ridgedale
- US 160 north of Branson; US 60 in Springfield; I-44 in Springfield; US 54 in Preston; US 50 in Sedalia; I-70 south of Marshall; US 24 in Carrollton; US 36 / Route 110 (CKC) in Chillicothe; US 136 in Princeton
- North end: US 65 at the Iowa state line in South Lineville

Location
- Country: United States
- State: Missouri
- Counties: Taney, Christian, Greene, Dallas, Hickory, Benton, Pettis, Saline, Lafayette, Carroll, Livingston, Grundy, Mercer

Highway system
- United States Numbered Highway System; List; Special; Divided; Missouri State Highway System; Interstate; US; State; Supplemental
← Route 64	→ US 66

U.S. Route 65 (US 65) is a north–south U.S. highway that runs from Clayton, Louisiana to Albert Lea, Minnesota. In Missouri, the highway enters the state from Arkansas, just south of Branson. The highway exits the state into Iowa near South Lineville.

== Route description ==
US 65 enters Missouri between the towns of Omaha, Arkansas and Ridgedale, Missouri. The road is a four-lane expressway, traveling through both Branson and Hollister towards Springfield. Through the Branson area, it is a freeway. North of Branson, the highway intersections with both westbound Route 76 formally part of Route 465 (a freeway spur) and U.S. Route 160. From Branson to Highlandville, U.S. 160 is the old alignment of U.S. 65 (until the 1960s).

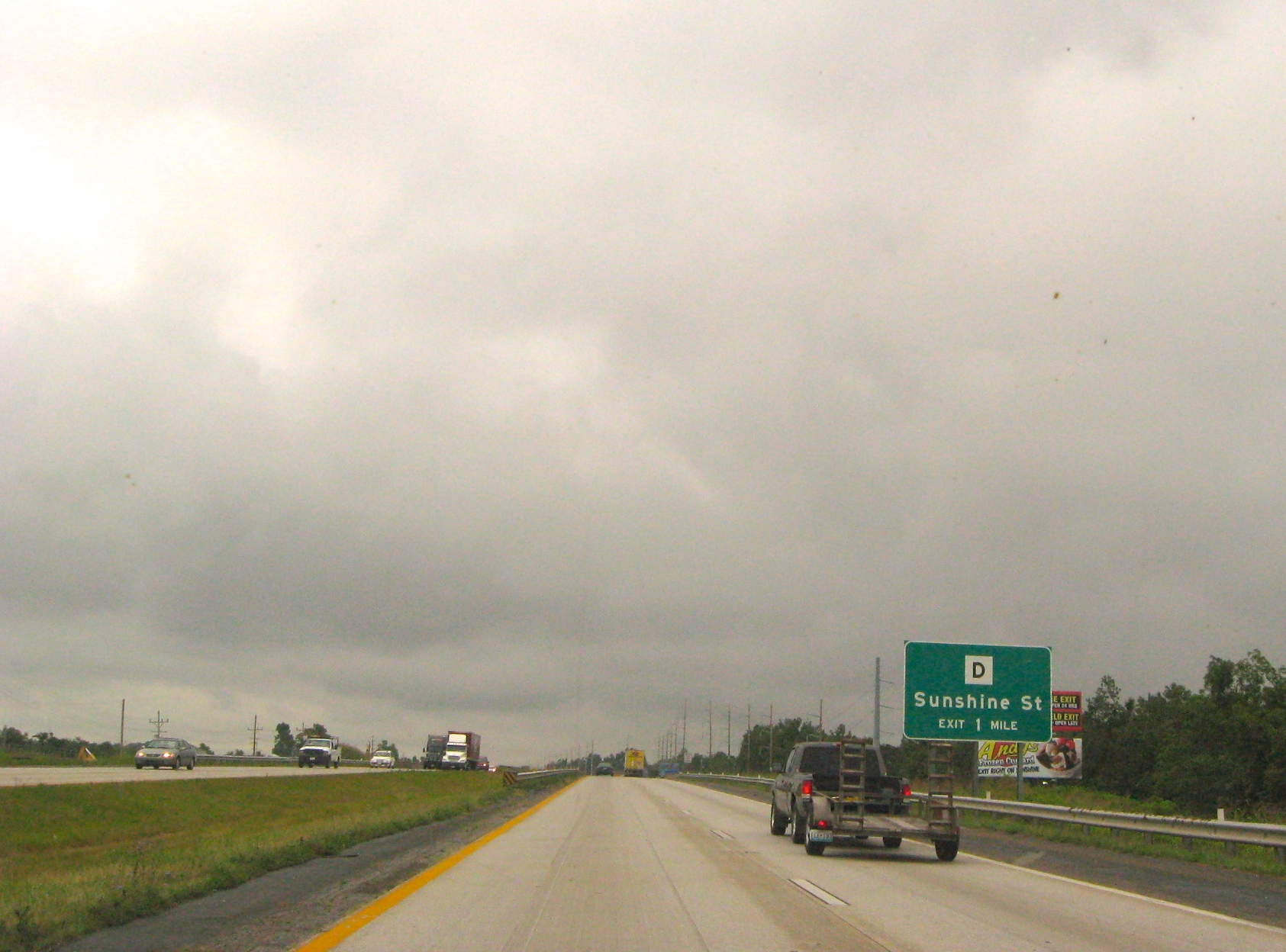
US 65 in Springfield

Just south of Route EE at the Highlandville exit, U.S. 65 returns to freeway status. The freeway is called "Schoolcraft Freeway" in Springfield, named in honor of Henry Rowe Schoolcraft. Also in Springfield, the highway has junctions with U.S. Route 60 (also known as James River Freeway) and Interstate 44 (I-44). The I-44 interchange includes a flyover ramp connecting northbound U.S. 65 with westbound I-44. U.S. 65 became a six-lane divided freeway in Springfield between Interstate 44 and MO CC And MO J it's currently being upgraded from 4 lanes to 6 lanes Between MO CC and MO J to BUS 65 and MO F in Ozark. It was the first six-lane highway in Southwest Missouri. North of Springfield, it returns to a four-lane expressway highway.

From Springfield to Buffalo, U.S. 65 is a four-lane highway. US 65 passes through Fair Grove before entering Buffalo.

Through Buffalo, the highway now becomes two lanes with a center left-turn lane, intersecting Route 32, then up to Route 73.

From Buffalo to Preston, entering Hickory County, U.S. 65 remains a two-lane highway and has a four-way intersection with U.S. Route 54. Continuing north, after passing through several towns, U.S. 65 then shares a concurrency with Route 7 before entering Warsaw, where the highway crosses over the western end of the Lake of the Ozarks at Osage River and again becomes a four-lane highway at the intersection where it separates from Route 7. After leaving Warsaw, U.S. 65 passes through Lincoln then has a brief concurrency with Route 52.

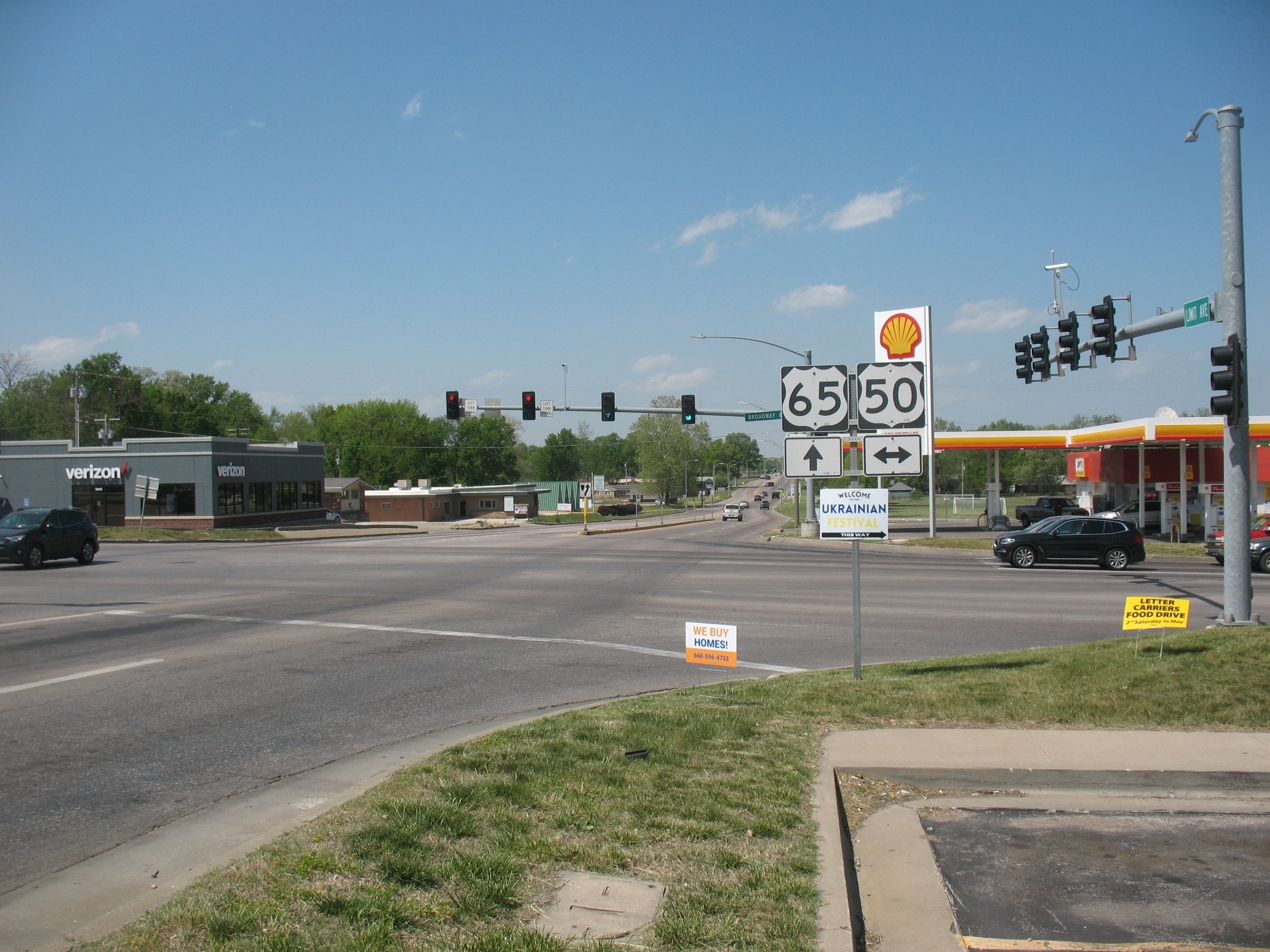
US 65 at its junction with US 50 in Sedalia

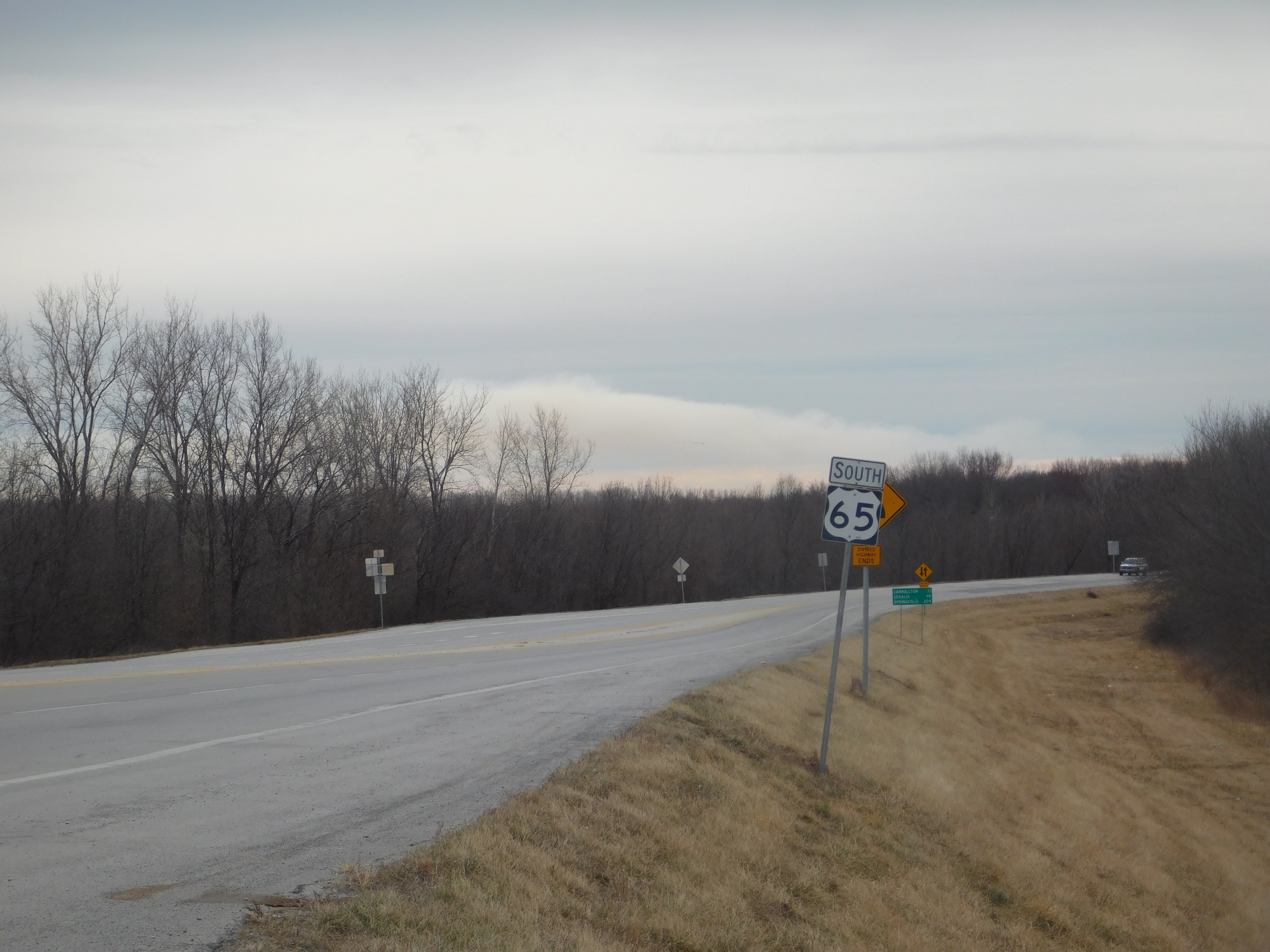
US 65 southbound from US 36 in Chillicothe

At Sedalia (where it is called Limit Avenue), it has an intersection with U.S. Route 50 (known locally as Broadway Blvd). At Marshall Junction, north of Sedalia in Saline County, U.S. 65 intersects with both Interstate 70 and U.S. Route 40. In Marshall (where it is called Lexington, Ave), U.S. 65 returns to two-lanes and stays so all the way up to Iowa. At Waverly, the highway becomes concurrent with U.S. Route 24 (which continues to Carrollton). Also in Waverly, U.S. 65 and U.S. 24 both cross the Missouri River on the Waverly Bridge. Further north, the road crosses U.S. Route 36 at Chillicothe and U.S. Route 136 at Princeton. The highway leaves Missouri at South Lineville and enters Iowa.

The entirely of US 65 in Missouri is part of the National Highway System.

== History ==
From 1922 to 1926, US 65 in Missouri was known as Route 3. US 65 originally followed Route 248 and US 160 between Branson and Springfield. Route 3 was originally planned on a shorter route between Springfield and Preston, with Route 71 on the longer alignment via Buffalo, but Route 3 was quickly shifted east, absorbing Route 71.

Various improvements from Springfield to Buffalo has been made over the years. In September 2010, US 65 becomes four lanes from Springfield to just south of Buffalo. In September 2011, U.S. 65 became a six-lane divided freeway in Springfield between Interstate 44 and U.S. 60. It was the first six-lane highway in Southwest Missouri.

== Major intersections ==
County	Location	mi	km	Destinations	Notes
Taney	Oliver Township	0.000	0.000	US 65 south – Harrison	Continuation into Arkansas
Taney	Oliver Township	2.807	4.517	Route 86 – Blue Eye	
Taney	Oliver Township	5.570	8.964	Route 265	Future interchange
Taney	Hollister	8.850	14.243	US 65 Bus. / CR 165 – Hollister	South end of freeway; Access to Lake Taneycomo, Bull Shoals Lake, Historic Downtown Hollister, and College of the Ozarks, Table Rock State Park, and Table Rock Lake.
Taney	Branson	11.447	18.422	Route 76 / US 65 Bus. (Main Street) / 76 Country Boulevard	South end of Route 76 concurrency; Access to Silver Dollar City, Shepherd of the Hills Outdoor Theater, Lake Taneycomo, Table Rock Lake, and Historic Downtown Branson
Taney	Branson	12.407	19.967	Route 248 / Red Route / CR 165 (Shepherd of the Hills Expressway) / Branson Landing Boulevard	Diverging diamond interchange; Access to Cox Medical Center - Branson.
Taney	Branson	13.250	21.324	Branson Hills Parkway / Bee Creek Road	
Taney	Branson Township	16.142	25.978	Route 76 (Ozark Mountain Highroad) / Route F	North end of Route 76 concurrency; Access to Silver Dollar City, Shepherd of the Hills Outdoor Theater, and Table Rock Lake.
Taney	Jasper Township	18.756	30.185	US 160 – Reeds Spring, Forsyth	North end of freeway; access to Lake Taneycomo and Bull Shoals Lake.
Taney	Jasper Township	21.698	34.920	Route 176 east – Rockaway Beach	Southern end of Route 176 concurrency
Taney	Jasper Township	22.597	36.366	Route 176 west	Northern end of Route 176 concurrency
Christian	North Galloway Township	32.741	52.692	Route EE – Highlandville	South end of freeway
Christian	Ozark	37.001	59.547	US 65 Bus. / Route F (South Street) – Sparta	
Christian	Ozark	38.295	61.630	Route 14 / US 65 Bus. (Jackson Street) – Nixa	Access to Wilson's Creek National Battlefield
Christian	Ozark	41.513	66.809	Route J / Route CC – Fremont Hills	
Greene	Springfield	43.622	70.203	Evans Road	Access to Missouri Veterans Cemetery
Greene	Springfield	45.541	73.291	US 60 / US 65 Bus. (James River Freeway) – Cabool	Access to the Missouri Sports Hall of Fame and Springfield-Branson National Airport
Greene	Springfield	47.711	76.783	Battlefield Street	Access to Battlefield Mall
Greene	Springfield	49.249	79.259	Route D (Sunshine Street)	Access to Mercy Hospital and Bass Pro Shops
Greene	Springfield	51.274	82.518	US 65 Bus. (Chestnut Expressway)	Diverging diamond interchange Access to Downtown Springfield, Missouri State University, Drury University, and Ozarks Technical Community College
Greene	Springfield	52.284	84.143	Route YY (Division Street)	Access to Evangel University and Cox College
Greene	Springfield	53.292	85.765	Route 744 (Kearney Street)	Access to Southwest Regional Conservation Office, MoDot Southwest District Office, and Missouri State Highway Patrol Troop D Headquarters.
Greene	Springfield	54.079	87.032	I-44 – Joplin, St. Louis	Separate exits southbound; serves Springfield-Branson National Airport exits 82A-B
Greene	North Campbell Township	54.809	88.207	County Road No. 102	North end of freeway; northbound exit and southbound entrance
Greene	Fair Grove	64.869	104.397	Route 125 / Route CC – Fair Grove	Interchange
Dallas	Sheridan Township	70.052	112.738	Route 215 / Route O – Olive, Pleasant Hope	Michigan left U-turn intersections
Dallas	Jackson Township	74.162	119.352	Route 38 / Route TT – Marshfield	Michigan left U-turn intersections
Dallas	Buffalo	83.153	133.822	Route 32 (Dallas Street) – Lebanon, Bolivar	
Dallas	Buffalo	85.026	136.836	Route 73 north – Tunas	
Dallas	Louisburg	91.671	147.530	Route 64 – Pittsburg, Bennett Springs	Access to Pomme de Terre Lake and Bennett Spring State Park
Dallas		99.136	159.544	Route NN – Nemo	Access to Pomme de Terre State Park
Hickory	Preston	105.306	169.474	US 54 – Hermitage, Macks Creek	Access to Lake of the Ozarks and Pomme de Terre Lake
Benton	Fristoe Township	124.044	199.629	Route 7 – Edwards	Southern end of Route 7 concurrency
Benton	White Branch	128.063	206.097	Route 83 south – White Branch	South end of expressway
Benton	Warsaw	129.688	208.713	Warsaw	No direct northbound entrance
Benton	Warsaw	130.249	209.615	Route 7 north – Warsaw, Clinton	Northern end of Route 7 concurrency; Access to Harry S Truman State Park
Benton	Warsaw	131.327	211.350	Truman Dam Access Road	North end of expressway; Access to Lost Valley Fish Hatchery and Truman Dam Visitor Center.
Benton	Williams Township	146.378	235.573	Route 52 east – Cole Camp	Interchange; southern end of Route 52 concurrency
Benton–Pettis county line	Williams–Flat Creek township line	151.426	243.697	Route 52 west – Windsor	Northern end of Route 52 concurrency
Pettis	Sedalia	163.315	262.830	US 50 (Broadway Blvd) – La Monte, Whiteman Air Force Base	Access to Bothwell Hospital
Pettis	Sedalia	163.912	263.791	Route 765 east – Business District	Interchange; northbound exit and southbound entrance
Pettis	Cedar Township	165.752	266.752	Route 765 south – Business District	no direct southbound entrance
Saline	Marshall Junction	181.887	292.719	I-70 / US 40 east – St. Louis	Cloverleaf interchange; I-70 exits 78A-B
Saline	Marshall Junction	181.887	292.719	I-70 / US 40 west – Kansas City	Cloverleaf interchange; I-70 exits 78A-B
Saline	Marshall	190.141	306.002	US 65 Bus. north	
Saline	Marshall	193.242	310.993	Route 20 (W. Arrow St.) – Blackburn, Marshall	
Saline	Marshall	194.015	312.237	US 65 Bus. south / Route 240 east / Lewis and Clark Trail / Santa Fe National Historic Trail to Route 41 – Slater	
Saline	Grand Pass Township	204.818	329.623	Route 127 south – Mount Leonard, Sweet Springs	
Lafayette	Waverly	211.213	339.914	US 24 west / Lewis and Clark Trail / Santa Fe National Historic Trail – Waverly	Southern end of US 24 concurrency
Carroll	Carrollton	220.839	355.406	US 65 Bus. north / Route 10 west / Lewis and Clark Trail – Carrollton, Richmond	
Carroll	Carrollton	222.526	358.121	US 24 east / US 65 Bus. south / Lewis and Clark Trail – Carrollton, Moberly	Northern end of US 24 concurrency
Livingston	Chillicothe	253.257	407.578	US 36 / Route 110 (CKC) – Brookfield, Hamilton US 36 Bus. begins	Interchange with the CKC; southern end of US 36 Bus. concurrency
Livingston	Chillicothe	253.359	407.742	US 36 Bus. east	Northern end of US 36 Bus. concurrency
Livingston	Chillicothe	256.428	412.681	Route 190 west	
Grundy	Trenton	276.310	444.678	Route 6 – Trenton, Milan	
Grundy	Trenton	277.384	446.406	Route AA (28th Street)	
Mercer	Princeton	299.403	481.842	US 136 east – Unionville	Southern end of US 136 concurrency
Mercer	Princeton	299.731	482.370	US 136 west – Bethany	Northern end of US 136 concurrency
Mercer	South Lineville	313.114	503.908	US 65 north – Lineville	Continuation into Iowa
1.000 mi = 1.609 km; 1.000 km = 0.621 mi: Concurrency terminus; Incomplete access

== See also ==
U.S. Route 65
Previous state: Arkansas	Missouri	Next state: Iowa
