= U.S. Route 65 =

Numbered U.S. Highway in the United States

U.S. Route 65
- US 65 highlighted in red

Route information
- Length: 966 mi (1,555 km)
- Existed: 1926–present

Major junctions
- South end: US 425 / LA 15 at Clayton, LA
- I-20 at Tallulah, LA; I-30 at Little Rock, AR; I-40 at North Little Rock, AR; I-44 at Springfield, MO; I-70 / US 40 near Marshall, MO; I-80 / US 6 at Altoona, IA
- North end: I-35 at Albert Lea, MN

Location
- Country: United States
- States: Louisiana, Arkansas, Missouri, Iowa, Minnesota

Highway system
- United States Numbered Highway System; List; Special; Divided
← US 64	→ US 66

U.S. Route 65 (US 65) is a north–south United States highway in the southern and midwestern United States. The southern terminus of the route is at U.S. Route 425 and Louisiana Highway 15 in Clayton, Louisiana. The northern terminus is at Interstate 35 just south of Interstate 90 in Albert Lea, Minnesota. Parts of its modern route in Iowa and historic route in Minnesota follow the old Jefferson Highway.

== Route description ==
=== Louisiana ===
U.S. 65 begins in Clayton, Louisiana and proceeds northward to Waterproof, St. Joseph, and Newellton, all in Tensas Parish. At Newellton, it intersects Louisiana Highway 4, coming from the west. In Tallulah, it intersects Interstate 20, and approximately 30 miles north of this intersection it enters Arkansas.

=== Arkansas ===
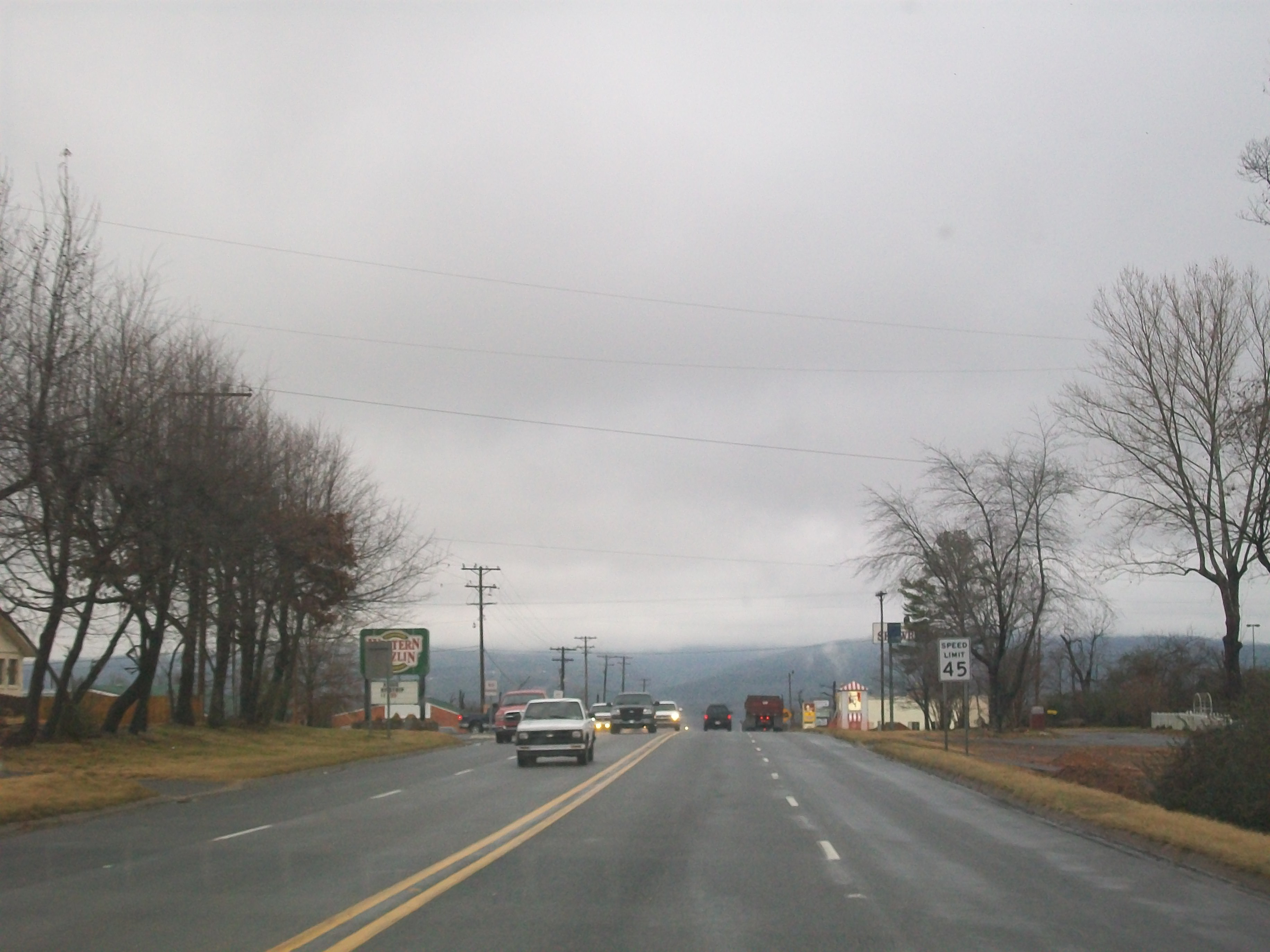
US 65 south of Clinton.

US 65 enters the southeast corner of Arkansas just north of Gassoway, Louisiana. It is designated as part of Arkansas' Great River Road from this point north through Lake Village, McGehee, and Dumas. The Great River Road continues east onto US 165, while US 65 continues northwest to Pine Bluff.

US 65 originally entered Pine Bluff traveling northwest along Harding Avenue, turning north along Ohio Street, then west through downtown along 5th and 6th Avenues, where northbound traffic used 5th and southbound traffic used 6th, before converging onto 6th Avenue west of downtown. The highway then turned north along Blake Street and followed Dollarway Road, now designated Arkansas Highway 365, northwest into White Hall.

US 65 was later relocated to a bypass corridor on the north side of Pine Bluff, dubbed the Downtown Expressway. With the completion of the Interstate 530 bypass on the south side of Pine Bluff, US 65 was rerouted along Interstate 530, and the Downtown Expressway was resigned US 65 Business.

The original US 65 between Pine Bluff and Conway is now signed Arkansas Highway 365.

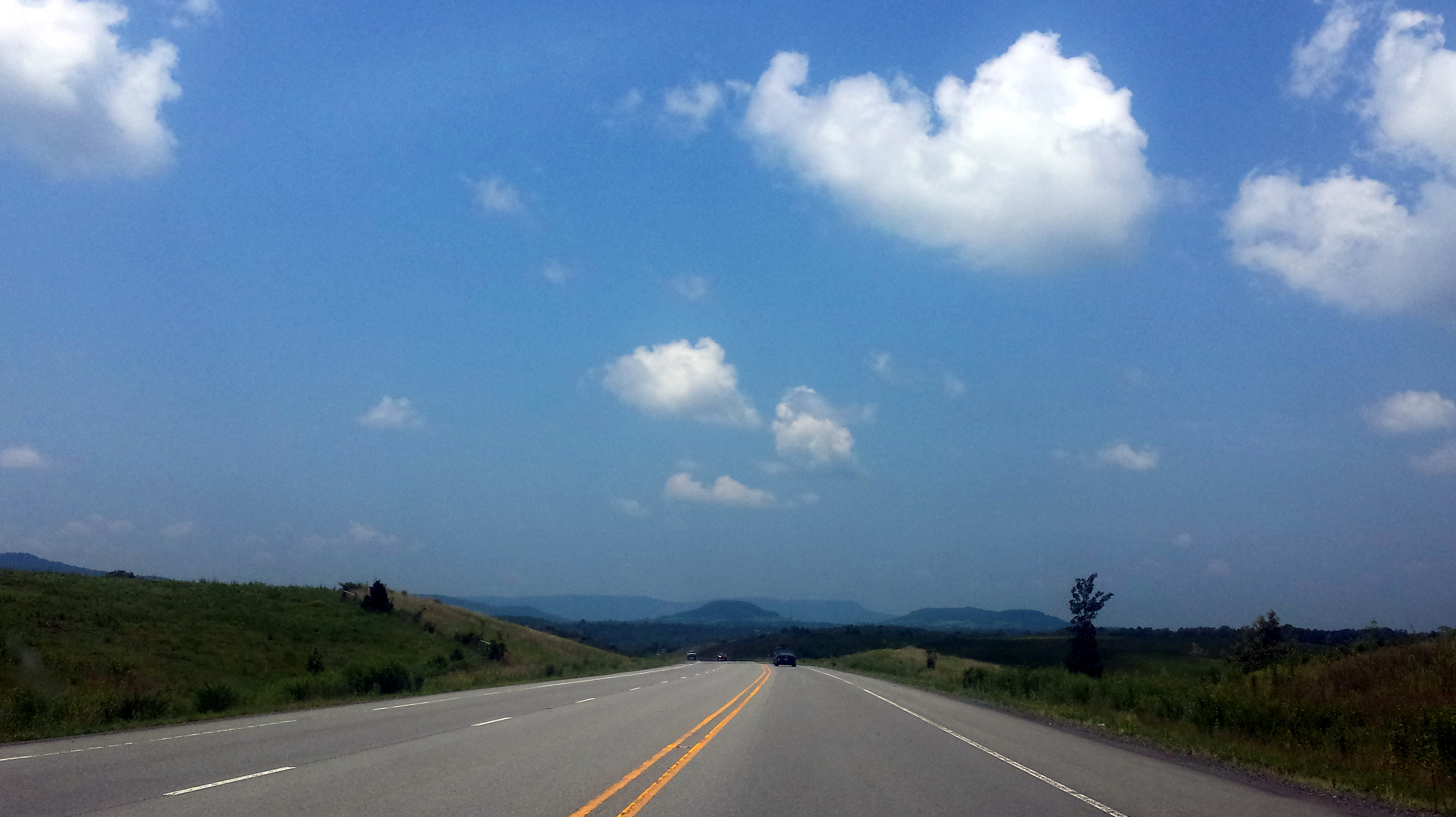
Highway 65 between Leslie and Harrison

US 65 originally entered Little Rock via what was then Confederate Boulevard (now Springer Boulevard), turning west onto Roosevelt Road, then routing northbound traffic onto Scott Street (with southbound traffic using Main Street one block to the west), and crossing the Arkansas River concurrently with US 67, US 167, and US 70 along the Main Street Bridge to Main Street in North Little Rock. The highway in Little Rock was eventually relocated five blocks west of Main Street to Broadway, where it crossed the Arkansas River via the Broadway Bridge. It was finally relocated east along Interstate 30.

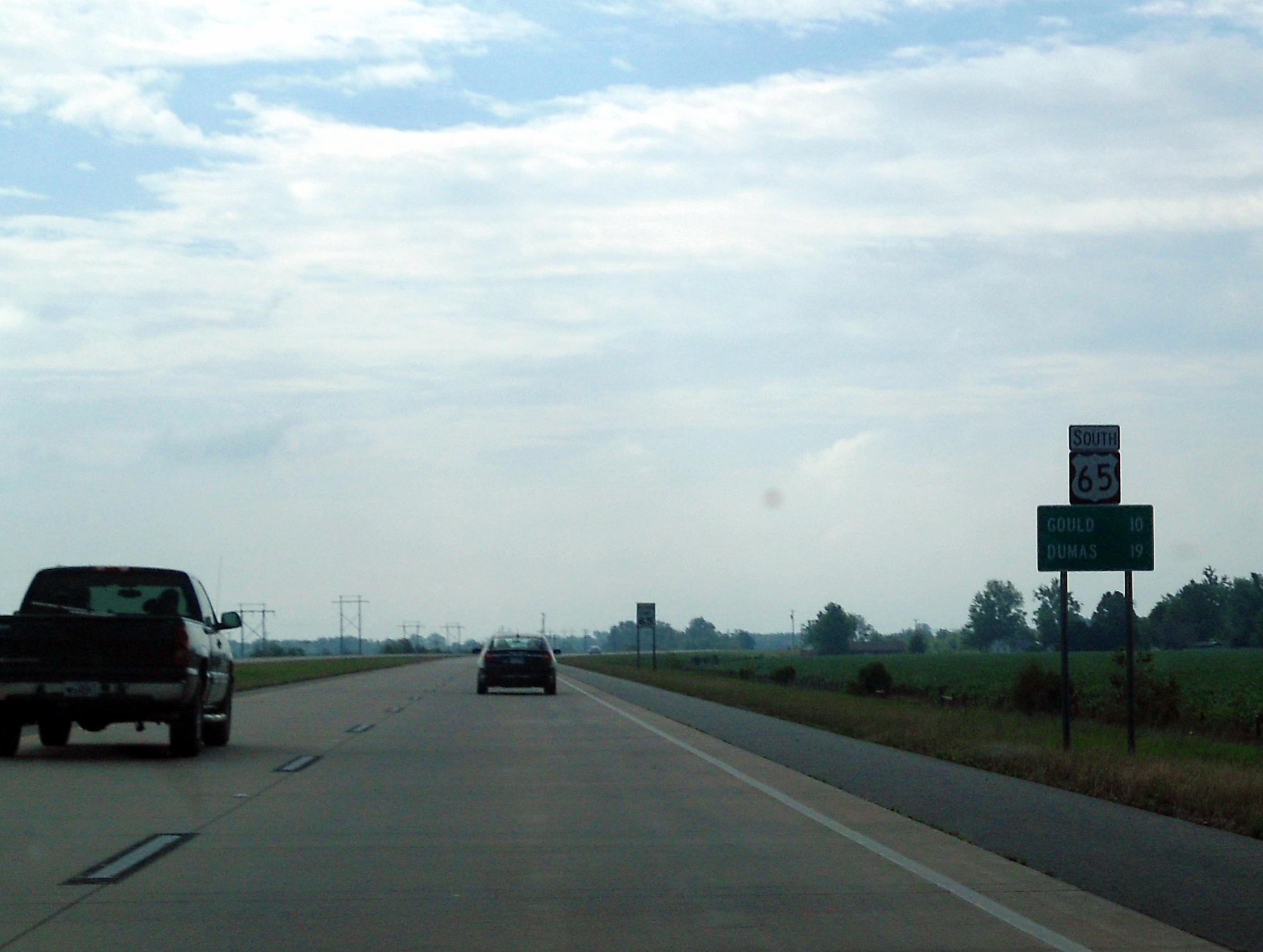
US 65 runs south near Grady

US 65 originally entered North Little Rock via the Main Street Bridge and continued with northbound traffic along Main Street (with southbound traffic using Maple Street one block to the west), converging onto Main Street, and diverging from US 67 and US 70 by turning west onto 18th Street. The highway then turned northwest along the east side of the railroad, along what is now Percy Machin Drive, and paralleled the railroad into Conway. US 65 was later relocated west, following the Broadway Bridge to a west turn on Broadway, proceeding under a rail overpass to then turn north on Pike Avenue. As US 65 progressed into North Little Rock's Levy neighborhood, its alignment shifted east of the railroad along Pike Avenue, turning northwest along Parkway Drive to converge with its original route near the city's Amboy neighborhood. Later, the Levy-to-Amboy segment was relocated again along the west side of the railroad via MacArthur Drive, eventually converging with its original route. US 65 was finally relocated east, through downtown along Interstate 30, then following Interstate 40 to Conway.

US 65 originally entered Conway via Harkrider Street, along what is now signed as Arkansas Highway 365, where it briefly joined with US 64 (Oak Street), running north through downtown. The highway was eventually relocated along Interstate 40, where it joins its original route on the north side of town via the city's Skyline Drive.

US 65 continues north through Greenbrier, Clinton, and Marshall before crossing the Buffalo River near Tyler Bend. South of Harrison, the highway joins briefly with US 62/412 heading northwest through Harrison before diverging from US 62/412 at Bear Creek Springs and continuing as a four-lane expressway into Missouri.

=== Missouri ===
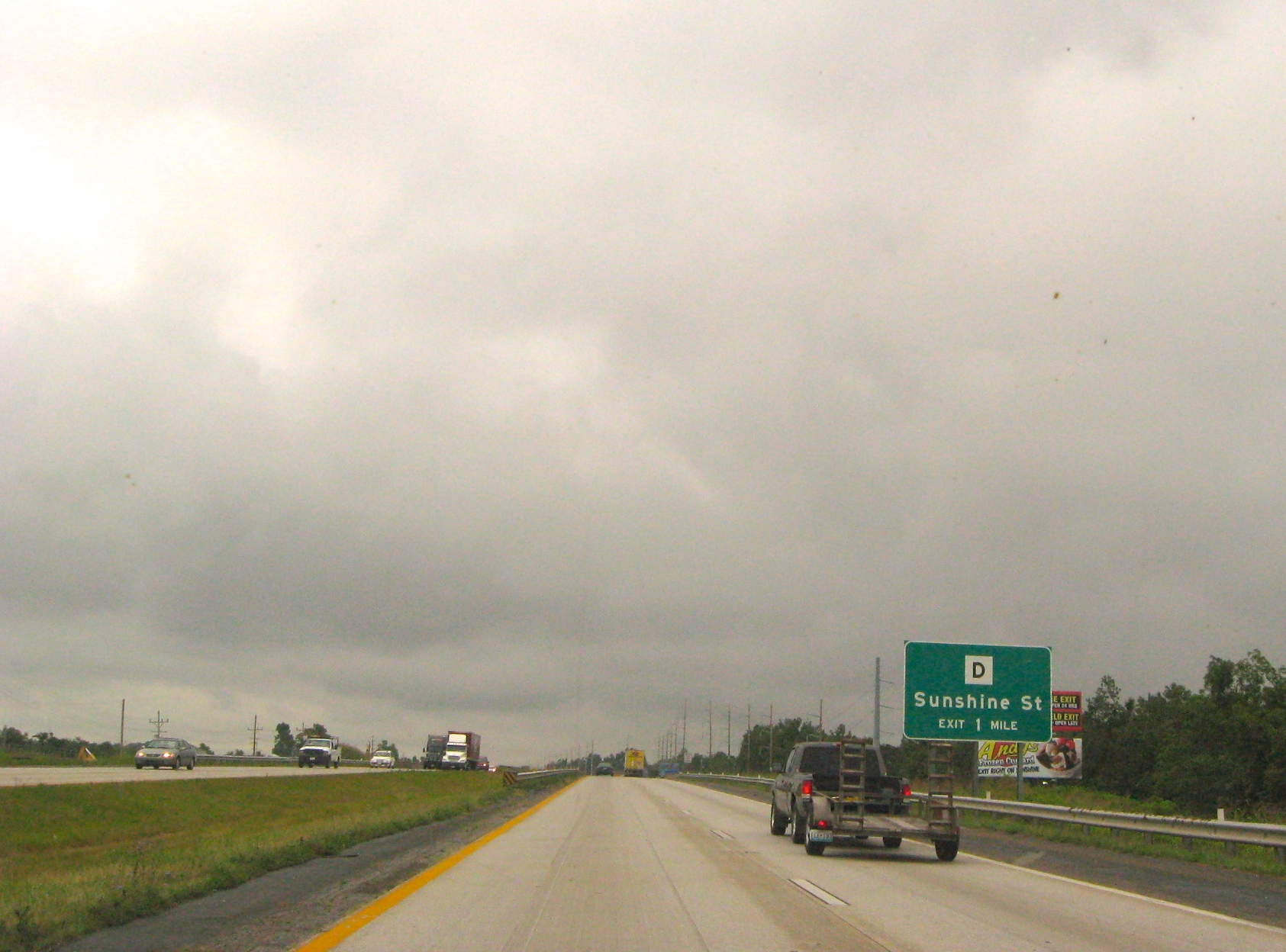
U.S. Route 65 in Springfield, Missouri.

US 65 enters Missouri between Omaha, Arkansas and Ridgedale, Missouri. The four-lane expressway continues through Hollister and Branson toward the Springfield metro area. Through the Branson area, US 65 is built as a freeway. North of Branson is an interchange with the Ozark Mountain Highroad (a freeway spur) and U.S. Route 160. US 160 to Highlandville is the old alignment of US 65 (until the 1960s).

Just north of Route EE (Highlandville exit), US 65 returns to freeway status. The freeway is called the "Schoolcraft Freeway" in Springfield, in honor of Henry Rowe Schoolcraft. In Springfield are junctions with U.S. Route 60 and Interstate 44. The interchange with I-44 includes a flyover ramp connecting NB 65 with WB 44. Construction is underway to rebuild the interchange at US 60 (James River Freeway). In September 2011, US 65 became a six-lane divided freeway in Springfield between Interstate 44 and US 60. It is the first six-lane highway to appear in Southwest Missouri. North of Springfield, it returns to a four-lane, non-interstate highway.

Through the town of Buffalo, the highway becomes two lanes with a center lane for left turns. This part of the highway has also seen upgrades in recent years, such as rumble stripes and extending the middle turn lane to just outside the northern part of the city. From Buffalo to Preston, US 65 is two-lane highway, having an intersection with U.S. Route 54 at Preston (a four-way stop). At Warsaw the highway crosses over the western end of the Lake of the Ozarks and becomes a four lane, non-interstate highway again at the intersection with Missouri Route 7.

At Sedalia is an intersection with U.S. Route 50, at Marshall Junction is an interchange with Interstate 70 and U.S. Route 40. In Marshall, the four-lane ends, and US 65 is a two-lane highway all the way to Iowa. At Waverly is the beginning of a concurrency with U.S. Route 24 (which will continue to Carrollton). Also in Waverly, US 65 and US 24 cross the Missouri River via the Waverly Bridge. Further north, the road crosses U.S. Route 36 at Chillicothe and U.S. Route 136 at Princeton. The highway leaves Missouri at South Lineville and enters Iowa.

=== Iowa ===
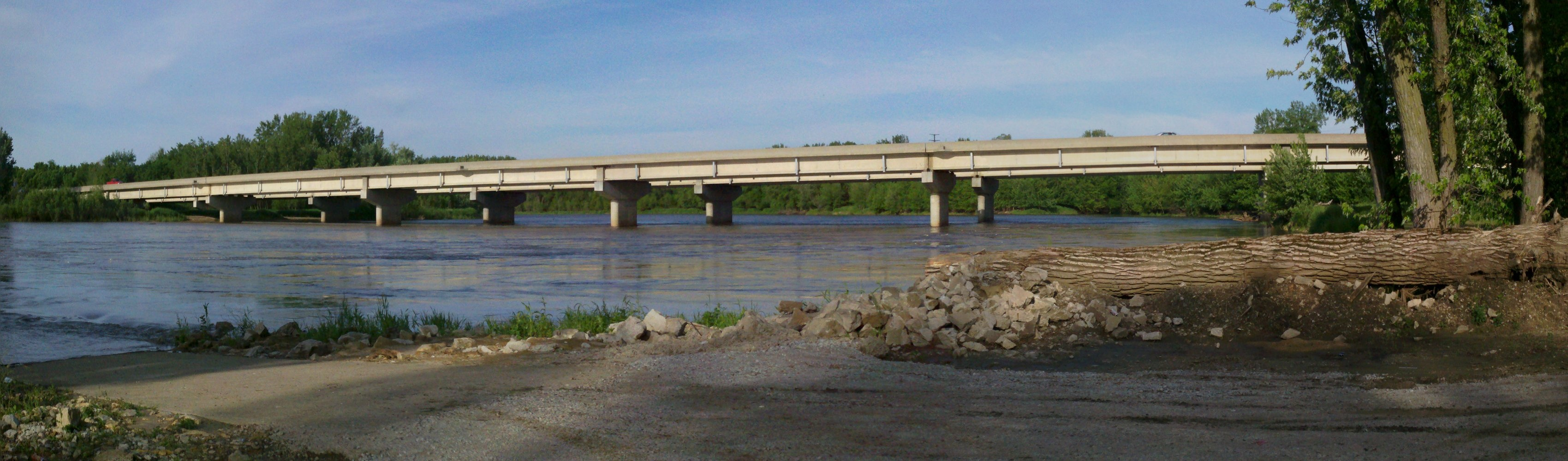
US 65 crosses the Des Moines River south of Pleasant Hill

U.S. 65 enters Iowa at Lineville. North of Liberty Center, it junctions U.S. Route 69. The two highways run together to the junction of Iowa Highway 5 just south of the Des Moines city limits. U.S. 65 forms the eastern side of the beltway around Des Moines. The highway runs concurrently with Interstate 80 for one mile (1.6 km), before exiting as an expressway running from southwest to northeast. This is part of the expressway connecting Des Moines and Marshalltown. At the junction of Iowa Highway 330 northeast of Bondurant, U.S. 65 becomes a two-lane road again. (The expressway continues along Iowa 330.) U.S. 65 junctions U.S. Route 30 at the Reed/Niland Corner located in Colo and U.S. Route 20 south of Iowa Falls. It intersects U.S. Route 18 south of Mason City, then goes north through downtown Mason City before leaving the state north of Northwood.

=== Minnesota ===
U.S. 65 enters the state at Gordonsville in Freeborn County. Its first Minnesota junction with Interstate 35 is just southeast of Albert Lea. The highway enters the city proper, reaching downtown before returning to end at Interstate 35. Its total length in Minnesota is 14 miles (23 km).

U.S. 65 is one of three Minnesota U.S.-signed highways to carry the same number as an existing state marked highway within the state, the others being Highways 61 and 169.

The Minnesota section of U.S. 65 is defined as part of Route 1 in Minnesota Statutes § 161.114(2).

== History ==
At its creation in 1926, U.S. 65 ran from St. Paul, Minnesota to Vidalia, Louisiana. In the 1930s the road briefly was signed to Swan River, Minnesota.

Its current endpoints were established in 1980 when a segment paralleling Interstate 35 was dropped in Minnesota.

Until 2005, US 65 ended at U.S. Route 61 in Natchez, Mississippi. US 65 formerly extended to New Orleans, along the same route as US 61 from Natchez to New Orleans.

From 1926 to 1934, the original U.S. 65 from Faribault, Minnesota to Saint Paul, followed what today is Minnesota Highway 3. After 1934, U.S. 65 was realigned to follow the present day route of I-35/I-35W from Faribault to Minneapolis. The section of U.S. 65 from Burnsville to Minneapolis originally followed Lyndale Avenue. Even after the completion of I-35/35W, the U.S. 65 designation ran to Minneapolis until 1980. In 1980, U.S. 65 in Minnesota merged with Interstate 35 until it separates in downtown Minneapolis leaving the city in the Central Avenue corridor. Beginning at Washington Avenue in downtown Minneapolis, Minnesota Highway 65 travels north through Cambridge, Mora, and McGregor before terminating at an intersection with U.S. Highway 71 in Littlefork (just south of International Falls).

=== Mississippi ===
In 2005, US 65 as a signed route was truncated from its signed southern terminus at U.S. Route 61 in Natchez, Mississippi to its current terminus at Clayton, Louisiana. As part of the truncation, U.S. Route 425 was extended south to Natchez.

Legally, the Mississippi section of U.S. 65 is defined in Mississippi Code Annotated § 65-3-3, as follows: "U.S. 65- Begins at the west end of the Mississippi River Bridge at Natchez, Adams County, and extends in an easterly direction to U.S. 61 and thence continues south jointly with U.S. 61 to the Mississippi-Louisiana state line south of Woodville, Wilkinson County."

=== Arkansas ===
Through central Arkansas, old 65 (now Highway 365) follows close to Interstate 40 between Conway and North Little Rock. In 1999, the 46-mile (74 km) section of U.S. 65 between Interstate 30 at Little Rock and Pine Bluff was designated Interstate 530. The original route from Palarm Creek in Northern Pulaski County turned with the railroad and followed a route which ran through what is now the River Plantation Neighborhood. It crossed the railroad within this community and followed the railroad from the West Side on what now is called Center Road through Mayflower and onto Conway. A realignment around 1931 which involved a more direct path from Palarm Creek to Conway resulted in the road being relocated from the West to the East side of the railroad. As a result, the city of Mayflower Arkansas moved slightly as well to stay on the new route.

=== Missouri ===
From 1922 to 1926, US 65 in Missouri was Route 3. US 65 originally followed Route 248 and U.S. Route 160 between Branson and Springfield. Route 3 was originally planned on a shorter route between Springfield and Preston, with Route 71 on the longer alignment via Buffalo, but Route 3 was quickly shifted east, absorbing Route 71.

=== Iowa ===
In 1934, its route in southern Iowa between Indianola and Leon was replaced by U.S. 69 as it took a new route through Lucas. In 1939, 65 took a new route running northeast of Des Moines.

Between 1994 and 2002, a freeway bypass of Des Moines was constructed and U.S. 65 moved to this new route.

== Major intersections ==
Louisiana
US 425 / LA 15 in Clayton
I-20 in Tallulah
US 80 in Tallulah
Arkansas
US 82 / US 278 south-southeast of Lake Village. US 65/US 82 travels concurrently to Lake Village. US 65/US 278 travels concurrently to McGehee.
US 165 in Dermott. The highways travel concurrently to Dumas.
Future I-69 north of McGehee
US 425 east of Pine Bluff. The highways share a hidden concurrency to Pine Bluff.
I-530 / US 63 / US 79 / US 425 in Pine Bluff. I-530/US 65 travels concurrently to Little Rock. US 63/US 65/US 79 travels concurrently through Pine Bluff.
US 270 in White Hall
US 167 in East End. The highways travel concurrently to North Little Rock.
I-30 / I-440 / I-530 / US 67 / US 70 in Little Rock. I-30/US 65/US 67/US 70 travels concurrently to North Little Rock.
I-630 in Little Rock
I-30 / I-40 / I-57 / US 67 / US 167 in North Little Rock. I-40/US 65 travels concurrently to Conway.
US 64 in Conway
US 62 / US 412 southeast of Bellefonte. The highways travel concurrently to Bear Creek Springs.
Missouri
US 160 northwest of Walnut Shade
US 60 in Springfield
I-44 in Springfield
US 54 in Preston
US 50 in Sedalia
I-70 / US 40 south of Marshall
US 24 in Waverly. The highways travel concurrently to Carrollton.
US 36 in Chillicothe
US 136 in Princeton. The highways travel concurrently through Princeton.
Iowa
US 34 in Lucas. The highways travel concurrently through Lucas.
US 69 south of Indianola. The highways travel concurrently to Des Moines.
US 6 west of Altoona
I-80 in Altoona. The highways travel concurrently through Altoona.
I-80 / US 6 in Altoona
US 30 in Colo
US 20 west-northwest of Owasa
US 18 south of Mason City
Minnesota
I-35 southeast of Albert Lea
I-35 in Albert Lea

== See also ==
- Special routes of U.S. Route 65
- U.S. Route 165

Browse numbered routes
← LA 64	LA	→ LA 66
← US 64	AR	→ AR 66
← Route 64	MO	→ US 66
← Iowa 64	IA	→ US 67
← MN 64	MN	→ MN 65
