= Missouri Route 765 =

State highway in Missouri, U.S.

Route 765

Route information
- Maintained by MoDOT
- Length: 2.635 mi (4.241 km)
- Existed: c. 1966–present

Major junctions
- South end: US 65 in Sedalia
- North end: US 65 in Sedalia

Location
- Country: United States
- State: Missouri
- Counties: Pettis

Highway system
- Missouri State Highway System; Interstate; US; State; Supplemental
← Route 763	→ Route 799

Route 765 is a short state highway in Sedalia, Missouri, in Pettis County. The route begins at an interchange with Limit Avenue in Sedalia (designated as U.S. Route 65 or US 65). The route runs eastward along West Main Street and north along North Ohio Avenue through downtown Sedalia. The route as it approaches its northern terminus becomes rural, after being primarily commercial and residential. Route 765's northern terminus is at an interchange with US 65's freeway segment. The last distance to the northern terminus is one-way, with northbound Route 765 merging into US 65 northbound.

== Route description ==
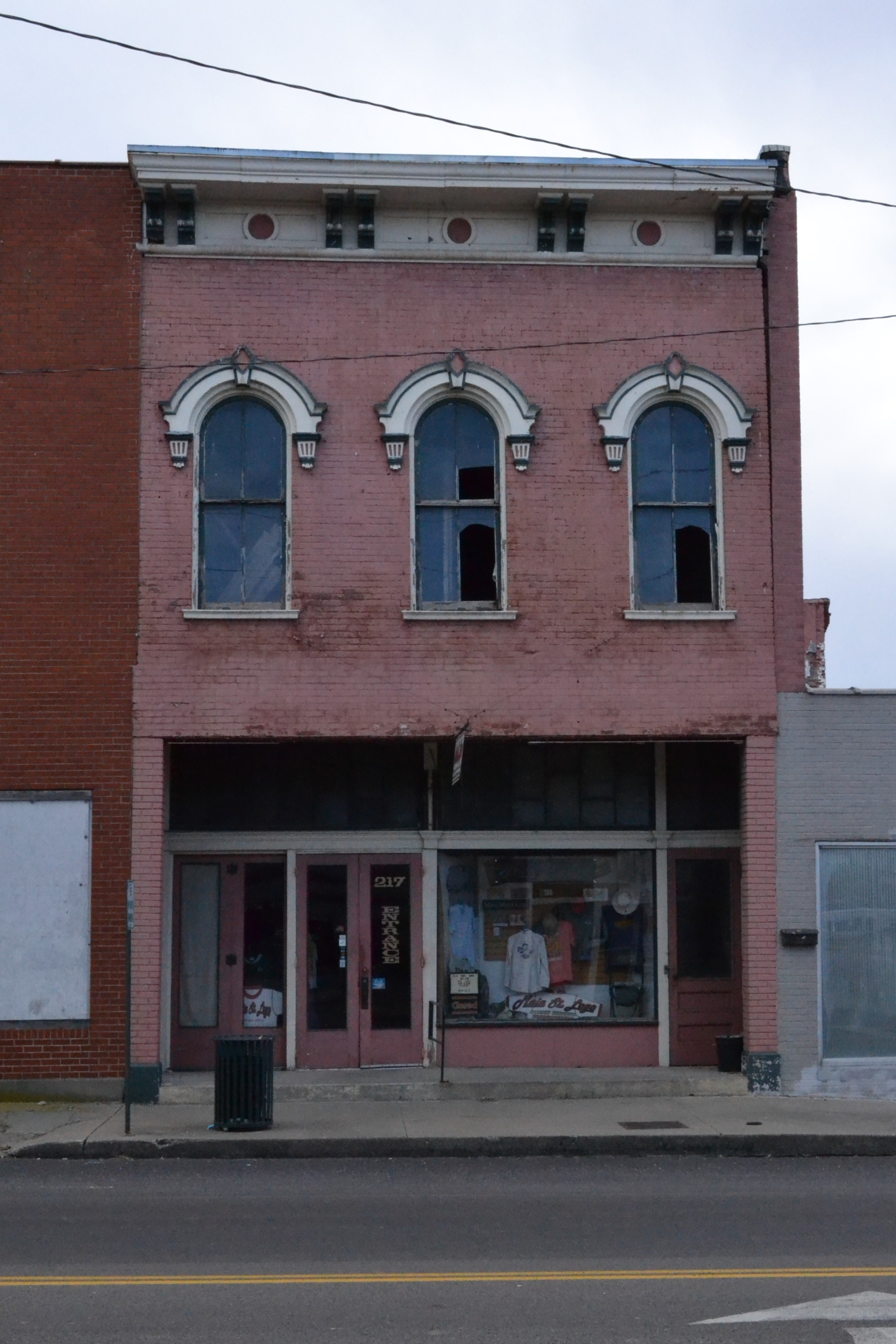
217 West Main Street, located on Route 765

Route 765 begins at a half-diamond interchange with US 65 (Limit Avenue) near Liberty Park in downtown Sedalia. The route heads eastward along West Main Street, passing local businesses and paralleling nearby railroad tracks, used by Amtrak. After the intersection with Park Avenue, Route 765 bends to the southeast. The route remains in this pattern for a distance, passing the Amtrak station in Sedalia at the intersection with North Kentucky Avenue. At the intersection with South Ohio Avenue, Route 765 turns northward off of West Main Street and turns north onto North Ohio Avenue. (The right-of-way of West Main becomes East Main Street after.) The highway passes to the east of the Amtrak station, crossing the tracks in the process. After the intersection with West/East Jefferson Streets, Route 765 turns from a commercial street to primarily residential. North Ohio Avenue bends to the northeast. After passing Henry Street, Route 765 makes a gradual bend to the northwest. At this point, the highway becomes rural, turning northward at the intersection with North Osage Avenue. Passing a dirt yard, Route 765 forks into a one-way highway, heading northward past mobile homes and some residences before the northbound lanes merge back into US 65 north. This merge is the northern terminus of Route 765.

== Major intersections ==
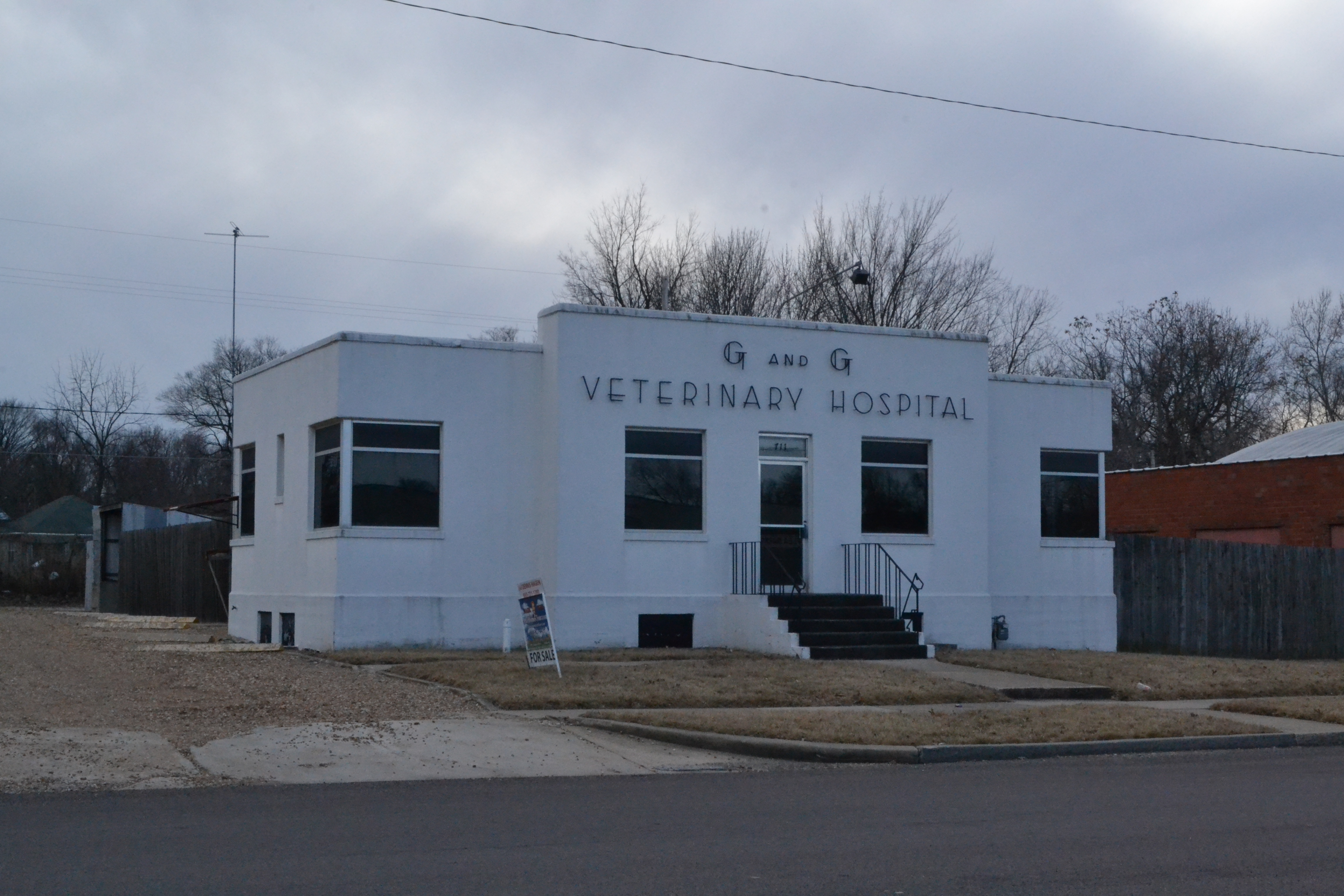
G and G Veterinary Hospital, located on Route 765

The entire route is in Pettis County.

Location	mi	km	Destinations	Notes
Sedalia	0.000– 0.024	0.000– 0.039	US 65 (Limit Avenue)	Southern terminus of Route 765; No access to US 65 N and from US 65 S
	2.635	4.241	US 65	Northern terminus of Route 765; No access to US 65 S
1.000 mi = 1.609 km; 1.000 km = 0.621 mi: Incomplete access
