= Lineville =

Lineville can refer to a place in the United States:

- Lineville, Alabama
- Lineville, Iowa
- South Lineville, Missouri
