= Arabia Steamboat Museum =

- Established: November 13, 1991
- Location: River Market, Kansas City, Missouri, United States
- Coordinates: 39.109778°N 94.581485°W
- Type: History museum
- Collections: Cargo of steamboat that sank in 1856
- Collection size: 200 tons
- Website: 1856.com

The Arabia Steamboat Museum is a history museum in Kansas City, Missouri, housing artifacts salvaged from the Arabia, a steamboat that sank in the Missouri River in 1856. The 30,000-square-foot museum opened on November 13, 1991, in the Kansas City River Market. The museum is operated by the partners of River Salvage Inc., who excavated the Arabia, and claims to have the largest single collection of pre-Civil War artifacts in the world.

== Overview ==
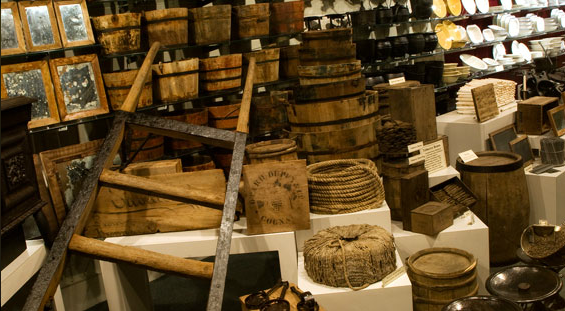
Artifacts on display

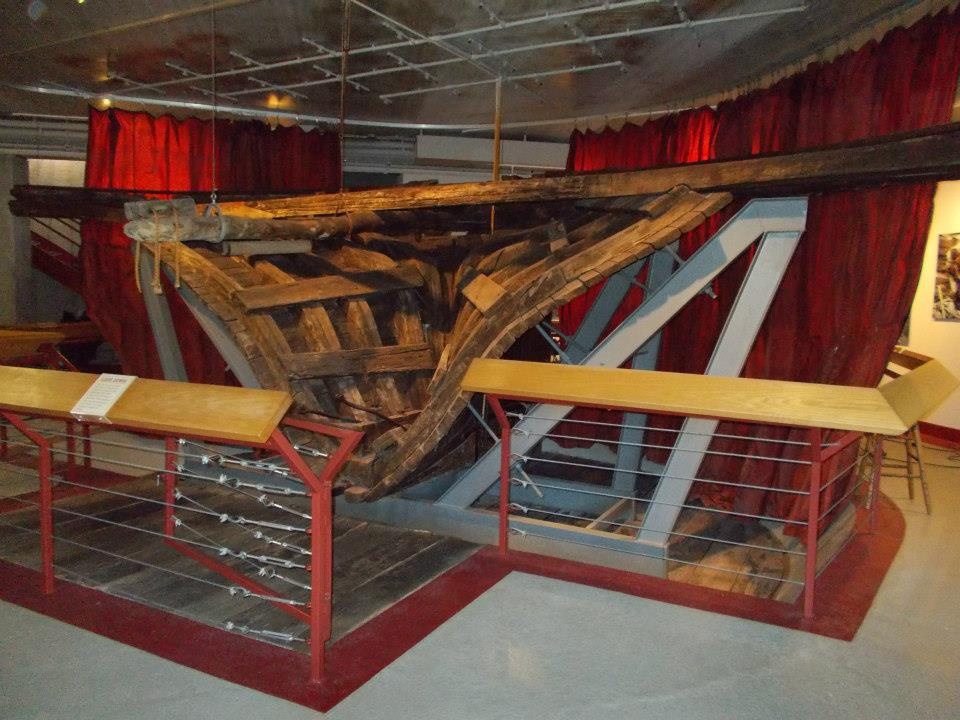
Stern of the Arabia

When visitors enter the museum, a series of four 5-minute videos recount the history of the Arabia's sinking and excavation. An additional 14-minute film called The Fall and Rise of the Steamboat Arabia may also be viewed in the theater. Next, guests view the artifacts on display, as well as an open preservation lab where staff members work on cleaning the many artifacts in storage. Restoring the items can be a lengthy process—even a small nail can take over an hour. Other items, like shoes and boots, may take up to three months to preserve.

Finally, visitors walk a 171-foot-long full-scale reproduction of the Arabia's main deck, where they can see archival footage of the excavation process and more information about its history, along with the original boilers, engine, anchor, and the skeleton of a mule. Also on display are the 6-ton stern and a reconstructed paddle wheel. The museum additionally offers a gift shop, meeting space, and after-hours event rental.

=== Collection ===
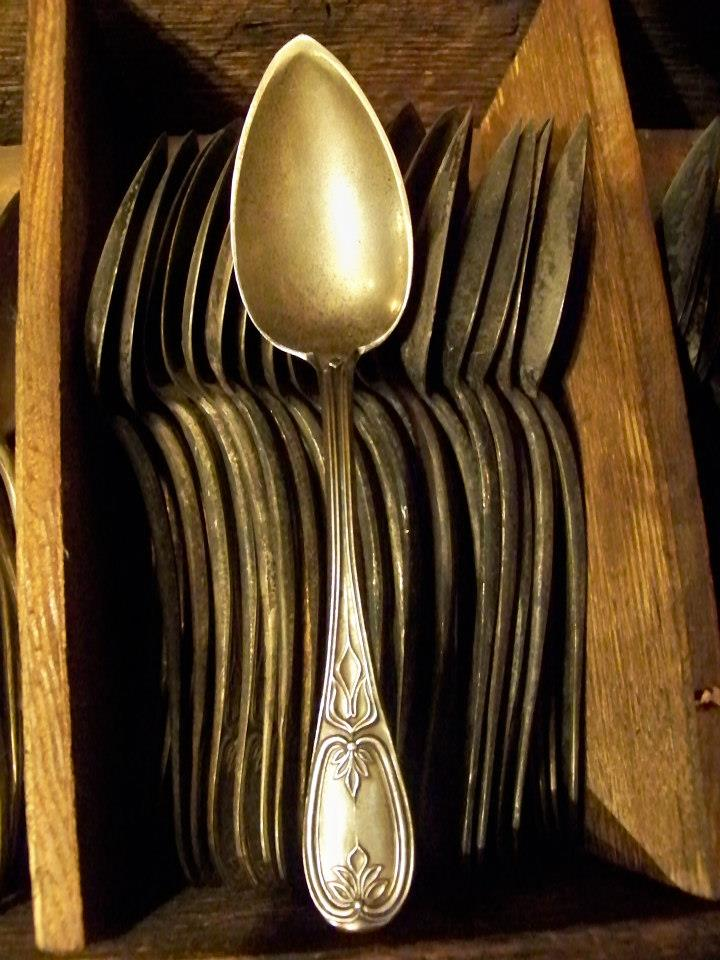
Spoons on display

The museum's collection consists of hundreds of thousands of items intended for daily life on the frontier including more than 4,000 boots and shoes, 247 hats, 235 ax heads, 29 jars of pickles, 328 pocket knives, and one children's doll. All are from 1856 or earlier; most of them were brand-new merchandise heading to general stores on the frontier. The Wall Street Journal called it "an Aladdin's cave of objects from the year 1856".

=== Exhibits ===
The museum debuted a new exhibit on November 22, 2013. It consists of the engine of the Missouri Packet, the first steamboat to sink in the Missouri River in 1820. The Hawleys excavated its engine in 1987, just outside the small town of Arrow Rock, Missouri. It did not yield many other artifacts, yet still inspired the Hawleys to continue their quest for sunken steamboats. David Hawley told The Kansas City Star, "An engine like this has never been on display." He believes it to be the oldest extant maritime steam engine in the United States.

In January 2013, the museum was closed for the first time in its 20-year history, to repair the ceiling and have the displays cleaned, reorganized, and expanded.

=== Loans ===
In 2014, the museum conducted its first major loan of artifacts to another institution. Approximately 2,000 objects from its collection went on display at the John Heinz History Center in Pittsburgh, Pennsylvania, on May 31, 2014. Because the Arabia was built in Pittsburgh and Brownsville, Pennsylvania, in 1853, the temporary exhibition was called "Pittsburgh's Lost Steamboat: Treasures of the Arabia". In addition to the artifacts, Heinz curators displayed information about the preservation process and a replica of the mule that represents the only fatality of the sinking. This exhibition ran through January 4, 2015.

== Steamboat history ==
The Arabia hit a tree snag and sank in the Missouri River on September 5, 1856. All 130 passengers survived, but an estimated 220 tons of cargo went down with it. Shortly thereafter, the river changed course, and the Arabia was buried underground. The cargo, destined for 16 towns on the frontier, was buried under a cornfield in Wyandotte County, Kansas, for 132 years until it was discovered in 1988 by River Salvage Inc., a group of self-proclaimed treasure hunters who began excavations. David, Greg, and Bob Hawley owned a refrigeration repair business. They partnered with Jerry Mackey, owner of Hi-Boy restaurants in Independence, Missouri, and David Lutrell from the construction industry, along with other family and friends, to form River Salvage Inc. With the permission of the land owner, they dug between November 1988 and February 1989. Although their original goal was to sell their discoveries, the historical importance of the finding quickly became apparent, and they started to plan a museum. Today, it is still owned and operated by the Hawley family, who are present there most days, often greeting visitors and answering questions.

=== Preservation ===
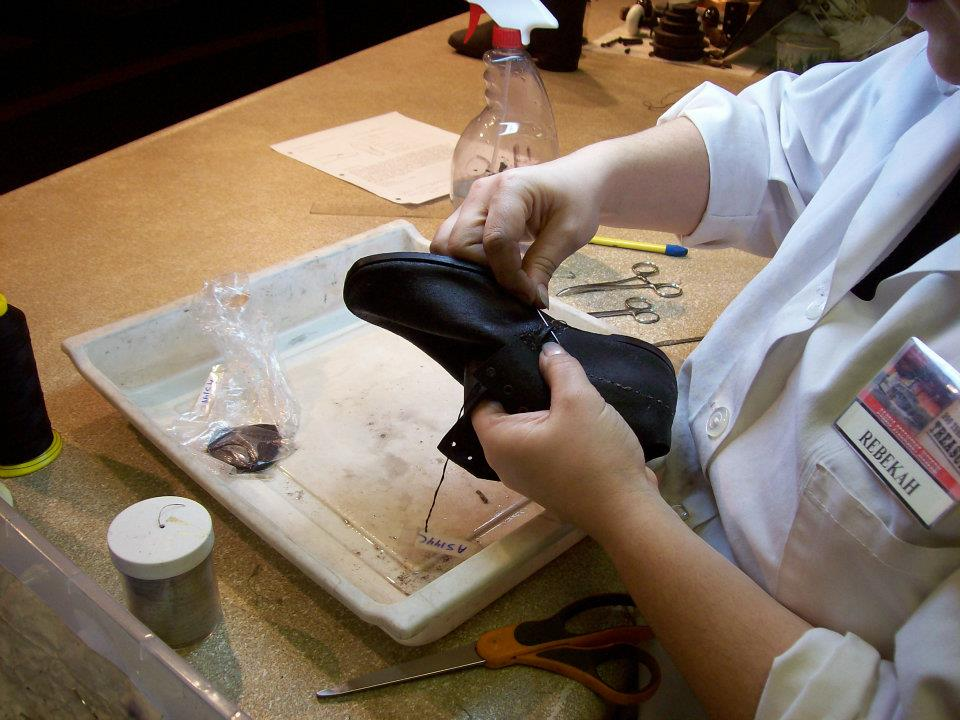
A preservationist restitches a shoe in the Arabia Steamboat Museum's preservation lab.

After the excavation of the Arabia, the next challenge for the partners of River Salvage Inc. was learning to clean and preserve the artifacts. During the digging process, organic artifacts had been stabilized in blocks of ice, both in Jerry Mackey's restaurant freezers as well as freezers installed in storage units in caves near the Missouri River. In the three months following the dig, larger wooden artifacts, including the stern, paddle wheel, and the lumber for two prefabricated houses found on board, were submerged in an 80-by-20-foot pool specially dug by the team. The crew partnered with conservators working on the Mary Rose Trust in Portsmouth, England, and the Canadian Conservation Institute in Ottawa, along with the Historical Resource Conservation Branch of the Canadian Parks Service, to learn freshwater preservation techniques. Organic materials like wood and leather are submerged in a food preservative called polyethylene glycol (PEG) and then freeze-dried. Preservationists gently remove oxidized material from metal artifacts using metal tools and special erasers. Bottled and jarred foods and beverages are injected with nitrogen, an inert gas. Shoes, boots, and garments must be restitched since their cotton thread dissolved under water.

The preservation process is still in progress at the museum. It was originally estimated that the preservation of the collection would be completed in 2022. Preservation efforts will likely take another 10-12 years, however.

== Reception ==
The museum has consistently received favorable press. The Kansas City Star named it "Rookie of the Year" in 1992 after having received over 20,000 visitors in two months. As of 2013, it continued to draw more than 80,000 visitors per year. It is described by the Wall Street Journal as "fascinating" museum with an "enthralling" story. US News & World Report ranks it number one on its list of "Best Things To Do in Kansas City". After remodeling the ceiling and displays in January 2013, the museum was awarded "Best Remodel" by local weekly publication The Pitch.

== Museum history ==
The Arabia Steamboat Museum opened on November 13, 1991. Various elements of the museum operated under different corporations: Arabia Instructional Museum Society (1995-2004), Arabia Museum Foundation (founded 1990) and Arabia Salvage Ltd.(founded 1988).

The museum and its operations were led by the two brothers who found and excavated the Arabia, Greg and David Hawley, and their parents, Bob and Florence Hawley. Greg was killed by a street racing driver in 2009. Bob died in 2019 and Florence died in 2021. David has continued the operation.

The lease in Kansas City (7 miles from the Arabia wreck site) expires in 2026.

Plans have been developed to move and expand the Arabia Steamboat Museum. In 2019, it was proposed to build the larger museum and move to Jefferson City, about 140 miles from the site of the Arabia wreck.

In 2021, plans were made to create the National Steamboat Museum at Marshall Junction, Missouri, about 77 miles from the site of the wreck. The plans include excavating five additional steamboats so that six are interpreted and displayed at the museum. The Marshall-Saline Development Corporation advance funded a $150,000 feasibility study for the new museum, but is not raising or collecting funds for the museum.

On November 13, 2025, the museum announced on their website that they would be closing permanently in November 2026.

== See also ==
- List of maritime museums in the United States
