= Colo, Iowa =

- City
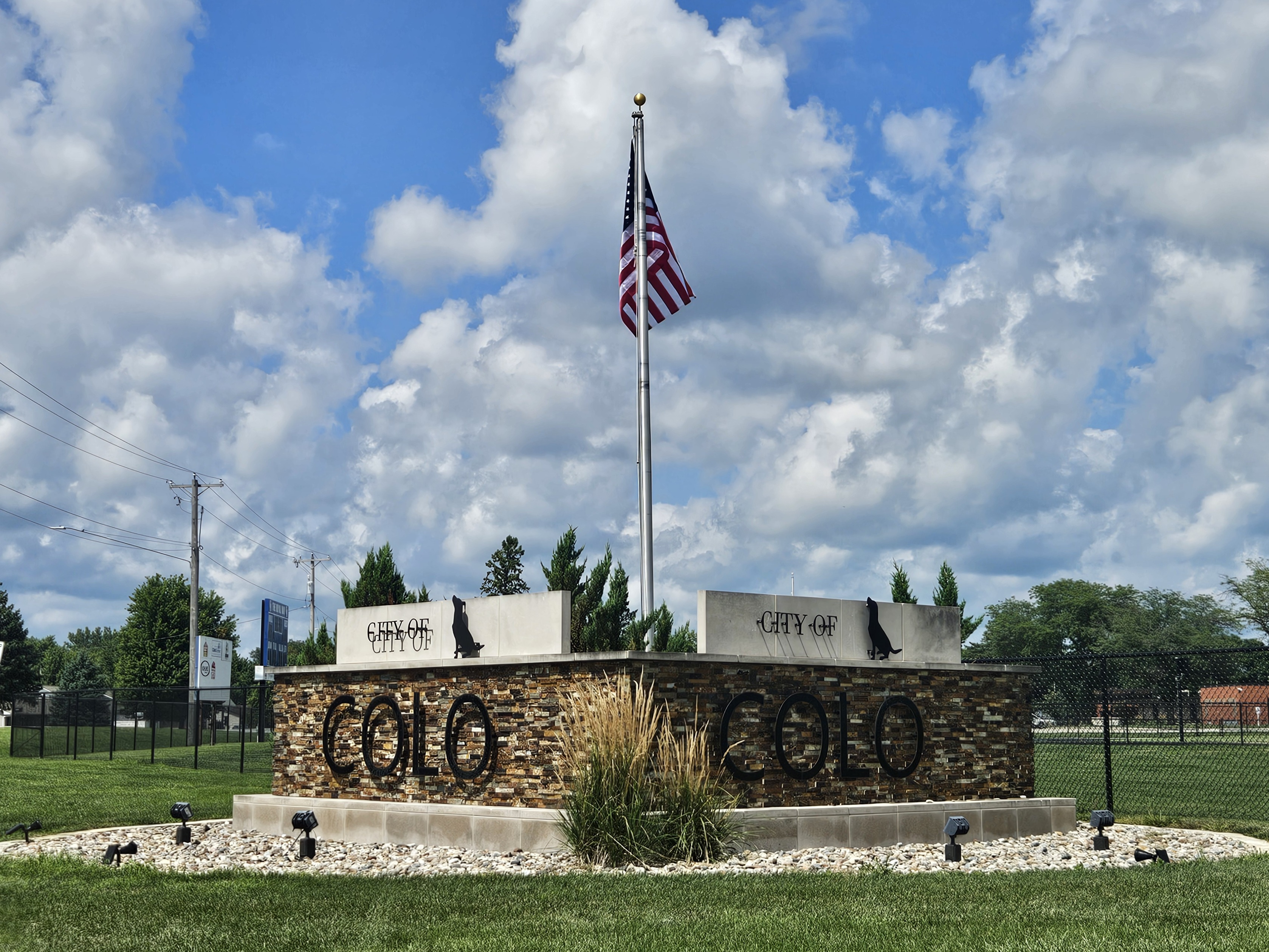
- Colo Welcome Sign
- Motto: "A place to call home"
- Location of Colo, Iowa
- Coordinates: 42°00′52″N 93°19′07″W
- Country: United States
- State: Iowa
- County: Story

Area
  - Total: 1.07 sq mi (2.76 km^{2})
  - Land: 1.07 sq mi (2.76 km^{2})
  - Water: 0 sq mi (0.00 km^{2})
- Elevation: 1,030 ft (310 m)

Population (2020)
  - Total: 845
  - Density: 793.7/sq mi (306.43/km^{2})
- Time zone: UTC-6 (Central (CST))
  - Summer (DST): UTC-5 (CDT)
- ZIP code: 50056
- Area code: 641
- FIPS code: 19-15240
- GNIS feature ID: 2393600
- Website: City of Colo

Colo is a city in Story County, Iowa, United States. The population was 845 at the 2020 census. The town is home to the "Crossroads of the Nation" as Lincoln Highway and Jefferson Highway intersect at Colo. It is part of the Ames, Iowa Metropolitan Statistical Area, which is a part of the larger Ames-Boone, Iowa Combined Statistical Area.

== History ==
Settlement of the area which would become Colo began in 1856 when the small village of New Albany was founded. By the early 1860s the railroad reached the area with the first train station in Story County being built in the community in 1863. Colo would be incorporated on April 26, 1876 and would take its name from the dog of railroad official John Blair. Reportedly Colo the dog succumbed to a grisly fate as it was crushed by a train that was carrying construction material. The community would see an influx of visitors in the 1920s and 1930s with the completion of the Lincoln and Jefferson highways which intersect in Colo at the Reed/Niland Corner.

== Geography ==
According to the United States Census Bureau, the city has a total area of 1.06 square miles (2.75 km^{2}), all land.

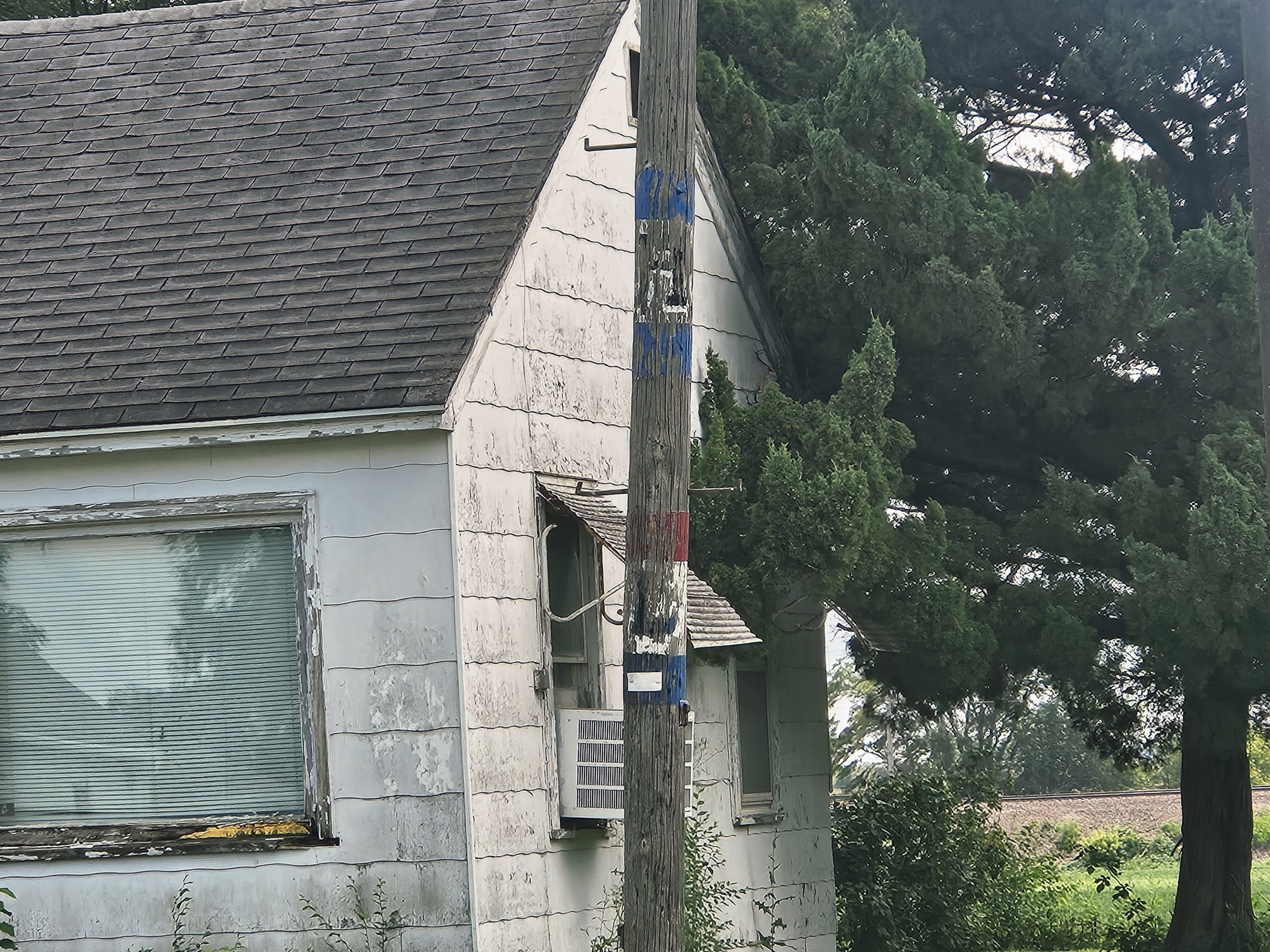
The Intersection of the Lincoln and Jefferson Highway

=== Climate ===
Climate data for Colo, Iowa (1991–2020)
Month	Jan	Feb	Mar	Apr	May	Jun	Jul	Aug	Sep	Oct	Nov	Dec	Year
Mean daily maximum °F (°C)	26.9 (−2.8)	31.4 (−0.3)	45.0 (7.2)	59.2 (15.1)	70.4 (21.3)	79.8 (26.6)	83.0 (28.3)	81.0 (27.2)	75.0 (23.9)	62.0 (16.7)	45.7 (7.6)	32.2 (0.1)	57.6 (14.2)
Daily mean °F (°C)	18.4 (−7.6)	22.6 (−5.2)	35.3 (1.8)	48.1 (8.9)	59.8 (15.4)	70.0 (21.1)	73.2 (22.9)	71.1 (21.7)	63.4 (17.4)	50.6 (10.3)	36.5 (2.5)	24.1 (−4.4)	47.8 (8.7)
Mean daily minimum °F (°C)	9.8 (−12.3)	13.9 (−10.1)	25.7 (−3.5)	37.0 (2.8)	49.2 (9.6)	60.2 (15.7)	63.3 (17.4)	61.3 (16.3)	51.9 (11.1)	39.3 (4.1)	27.2 (−2.7)	16.1 (−8.8)	37.9 (3.3)
Average precipitation inches (mm)	0.95 (24)	1.20 (30)	2.01 (51)	3.48 (88)	4.81 (122)	5.78 (147)	4.32 (110)	4.22 (107)	3.37 (86)	2.74 (70)	2.04 (52)	1.54 (39)	36.46 (926)
Average snowfall inches (cm)	7.4 (19)	7.6 (19)	4.5 (11)	1.7 (4.3)	0.0 (0.0)	0.0 (0.0)	0.0 (0.0)	0.0 (0.0)	0.0 (0.0)	0.7 (1.8)	1.9 (4.8)	6.8 (17)	30.6 (76.9)
Source: NOAA

== Demographics ==
Historical populations
Year	Pop.	±%
1870	226	—
1880	296	+31.0%
1890	261	−11.8%
1900	391	+49.8%
1910	463	+18.4%
1920	507	+9.5%
1930	532	+4.9%
1940	539	+1.3%
1950	538	−0.2%
1960	574	+6.7%
1970	606	+5.6%
1980	808	+33.3%
1990	771	−4.6%
2000	868	+12.6%
2010	876	+0.9%
2020	845	−3.5%
Source:"U.S. Census website". United States Census Bureau. and Iowa Data Center; Source: U.S. Decennial Census

=== 2020 census ===
As of the census of 2020, there were 845 people, 344 households, and 228 families residing in the city. The population density was 793.6 inhabitants per square mile (306.4/km^{2}). There were 367 housing units at an average density of 344.7 per square mile (133.1/km^{2}). The racial makeup of the city was 97.0% White, 0.1% Black or African American, 0.0% Native American, 0.0% Asian, 0.0% Pacific Islander, 0.8% from other races and 2.0% from two or more races. Hispanic or Latino persons of any race comprised 1.8% of the population.

Of the 344 households, 29.1% of which had children under the age of 18 living with them, 53.5% were married couples living together, 9.9% were cohabitating couples, 20.1% had a female householder with no spouse or partner present and 16.6% had a male householder with no spouse or partner present. 33.7% of all households were non-families. 24.7% of all households were made up of individuals, 11.0% had someone living alone who was 65 years old or older.

The median age in the city was 41.0 years. 26.4% of the residents were under the age of 20; 3.7% were between the ages of 20 and 24; 23.9% were from 25 and 44; 29.2% were from 45 and 64; and 16.8% were 65 years of age or older. The gender makeup of the city was 49.2% male and 50.8% female.

=== 2010 census ===
As of the census of 2010, there were 876 people, 348 households, and 252 families living in the city. The population density was 826.4 inhabitants per square mile (319.1/km^{2}). There were 370 housing units at an average density of 349.1 per square mile (134.8/km^{2}). The racial makeup of the city was 98.6% White, 0.3% African American, 0.2% Native American, 0.3% from other races, and 0.5% from two or more races. Hispanic or Latino of any race were 0.9% of the population.

There were 348 households, of which 33.3% had children under the age of 18 living with them, 56.6% were married couples living together, 10.9% had a female householder with no husband present, 4.9% had a male householder with no wife present, and 27.6% were non-families. 23.6% of all households were made up of individuals, and 10% had someone living alone who was 65 years of age or older. The average household size was 2.52 and the average family size was 2.94.

The median age in the city was 40.9 years. 26.3% of residents were under the age of 18; 6.4% were between the ages of 18 and 24; 23.3% were from 25 to 44; 29.2% were from 45 to 64; and 14.8% were 65 years of age or older. The gender makeup of the city was 49.8% male and 50.2% female.

=== 2000 census ===
As of the census of 2000, there were 868 people, 339 households, and 248 families living in the city. The population density was 1,121.9 inhabitants per square mile (433.2/km^{2}). There were 354 housing units at an average density of 457.6 per square mile (176.7/km^{2}). The racial makeup of the city was 97.70% White, 0.92% African American, 0.46% Asian, 0.23% from other races, and 0.69% from two or more races. Hispanic or Latino of any race were 0.23% of the population.

There were 339 households, out of which 33.6% had children under the age of 18 living with them, 64.3% were married couples living together, 5.9% had a female householder with no husband present, and 26.8% were non-families. 22.1% of all households were made up of individuals, and 11.5% had someone living alone who was 65 years of age or older. The average household size was 2.56 and the average family size was 3.02.

27.6% are under the age of 18, 7.8% from 18 to 24, 30.5% from 25 to 44, 17.5% from 45 to 64, and 16.5% who were 65 years of age or older. The median age was 36 years. For every 100 females, there were 98.2 males. For every 100 females age 18 and over, there were 96.9 males.

The median income for a household in the city was $41,711, and the median income for a family was $48,438. Males had a median income of $33,500 versus $24,091 for females. The per capita income for the city was $19,173. About 2.8% of families and 5.6% of the population were below the poverty line, including 3.1% of those under age 18 and 8.2% of those age 65 or over.

== Parks and recreation ==
Located near Colo is Hickory Grove Park, Story County's largest recreational, fishing, and swimming area with 445 acres, including a 98-acre (400,000 m^{2}) lake. Hickory Grove was used as a filming location in the 1996 disaster film, Twister.

East of Colo along the Lincoln Highway is the Colo Bogs, a wildlife management area administered by the Iowa Department of Natural Resources. The site is notable for being a stopping point for many migratory birds. Water from the Colo Bogs drains into the Iowa River just east of Marshalltown.

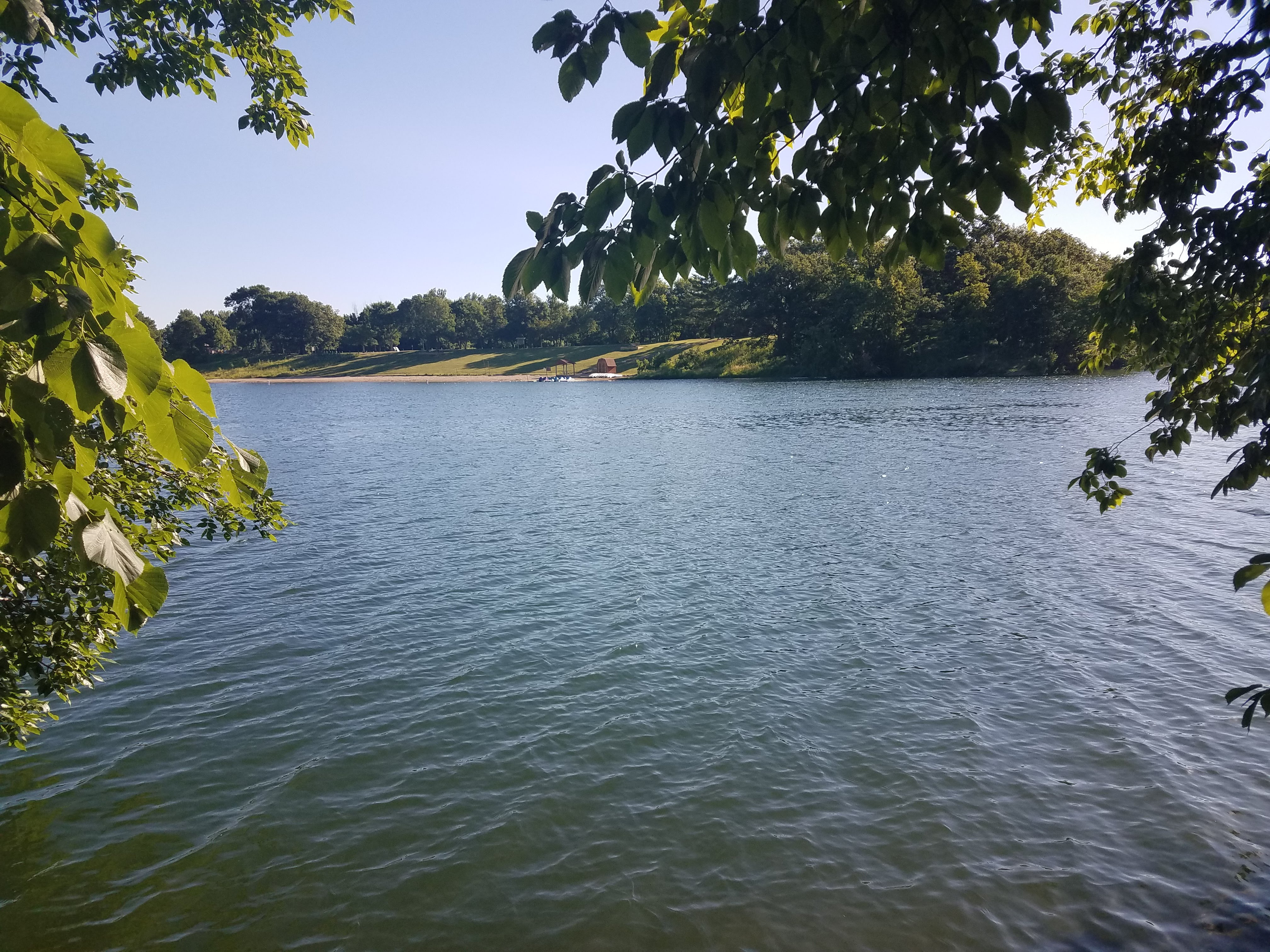
Hickory Grove Park as of 2017

== Education ==
The community is within the Colo–NESCO Community School District. The district was established on July 1, 1987, by the merger of the Colo and NESCO school districts. The district operates an elementary school in Zearing and a middle and high school in Colo.

As of the 2024-2025 academic year, the district has 385 students.

== Infrastructure ==
=== Transportation ===
Colo is located at the intersection of the historic Lincoln and Jefferson highways. The intersection is marked by the historic complex of Reed/Niland Corner, which includes a diner, vintage gas station, motel, and small park. It is one of only a few "one-stop" gas station complexes remaining along the Lincoln Highway.

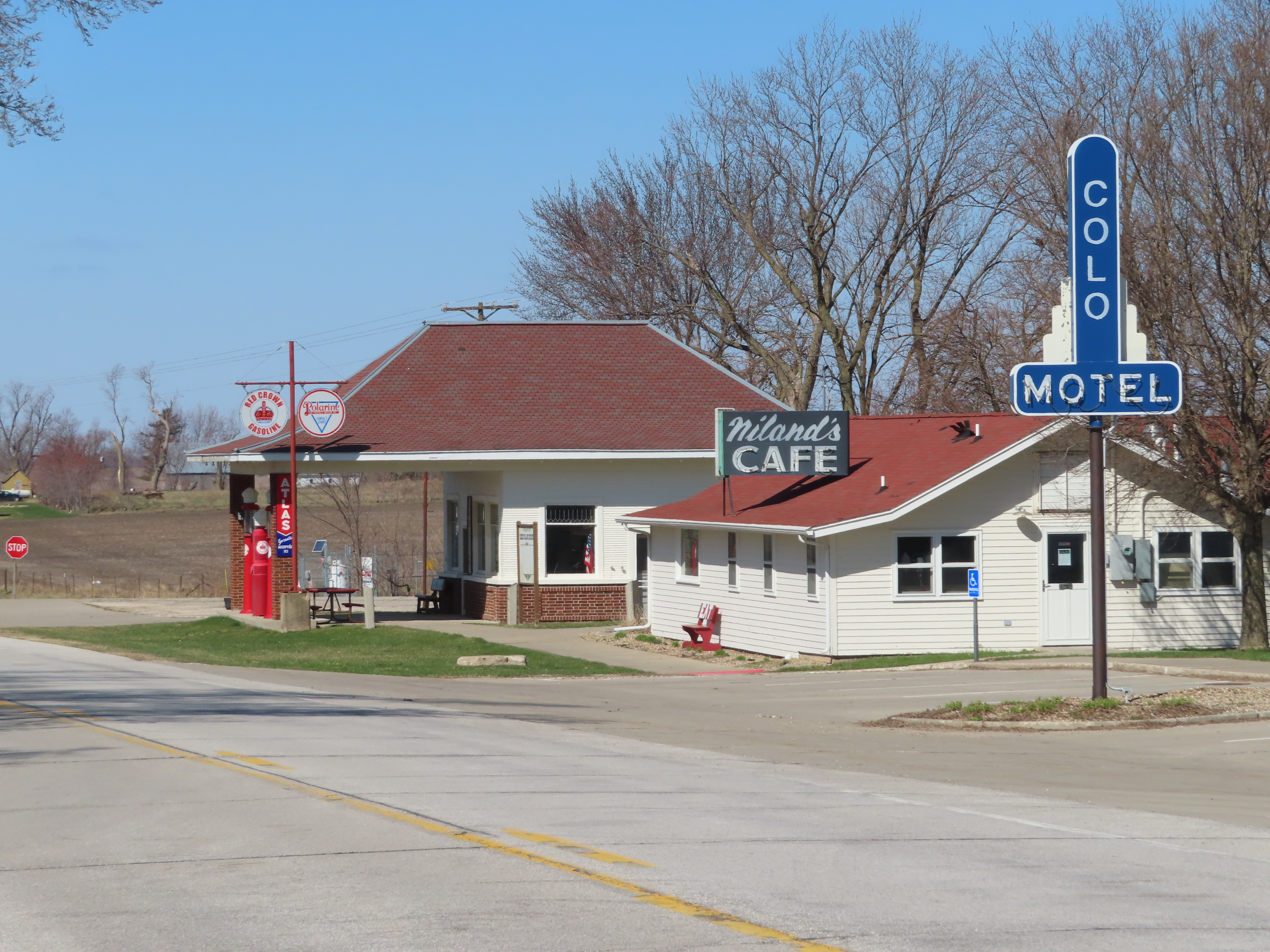
Historic Reed/Niland Corner found on the intersection of U.S Route 30 and U.S Route 65.

For modern-day travelers, Colo lies at the intersection of U.S. Route 30 (halfway between Ames and Marshalltown), and U.S. Route 65 (halfway between Des Moines and Iowa Falls).

The Overland Route of the Union Pacific Railroad runs through Colo, splitting the town in half. The community is within the Clinton Subdivision portion of the route.

== Notable people ==
- John Darnielle, musician and novelist. Founder of the band The Mountain Goats. Lived and worked in Colo.
- Michael Fitzgerald, longest serving state Treasurer in United States history (1983-2023)
- Robert Lounsberry, 11th Secretary of Agriculture of Iowa from 1973-1987
- Jim Lounsbury, Host of early rock and roll radio programs
