= Napoleon Buck House =

Historic house in Missouri, United States

- U.S. National Register of Historic Places
- Location within Missouri Location within the United States
- Location: 0.40 mi. S of jct. of US 24 and MO 273, near Waverly, Missouri
- Coordinates: 39°11′49″N 93°32′9″W
- Area: less than one acre
- Built: 1873
- Architectural style: Greek Revival
- MPS: Antebellum Resources of Johnson, Lafayette, Pettis, and Saline Counties MPS
- NRHP reference No.: 97001431
- Added to NRHP: November 14, 1997

Napoleon Buck House was a historic home located near Waverly, Lafayette County, Missouri. It was built about 1873, and was a two-story, central passage plan, vernacular Greek Revival style brick I-house. It had a two-story rear ell supporting a double-gallery porch. It featured segmental arched openings. The house is no longer in existence.

It was listed on the National Register of Historic Places in 1997.
