= Arabia (steamboat) =

Historical steamboat that shipwrecked in the Missouri River

Coordinates: 39°10′24.97″N 94°40′12.89″W

History

United States
- Name: Arabia
- Owner: Captain William Terrill and William Boyd
- Operator: William Terrill
- Route: Ohio River, Mississippi River, and the Missouri River
- Cost: $20,000
- Laid down: 1853
- Out of service: September 5, 1856
- Identification: In 1897, there was an 'expedition' to the buried ship to recover a large amount of whiskey reported to be onboard. The caisson used during this excavation was left in place and recovered during the 1988 excavation.
- Fate: Sank after hitting tree snag

General characteristics
- Class & type: River excursion paddle steamer
- Tonnage: 222 grt
- Length: 171 ft (52 m)
- Beam: 29 ft (8.8 m)
- Installed power: Boilers
- Propulsion: 2 28 ft (8.5 m) paddlewheels
- Speed: 5 mph (8.0 km/h)
- Crew: Approximately 30

The Arabia is a paddle steamer that sank in the Missouri River, on September 5, 1856, when it was gored upon a submerged tree snag. It was rediscovered in 1988 by a team of local researchers in what became Kansas City, Kansas. Its recovered artifacts are housed in the Arabia Steamboat Museum.

== History ==
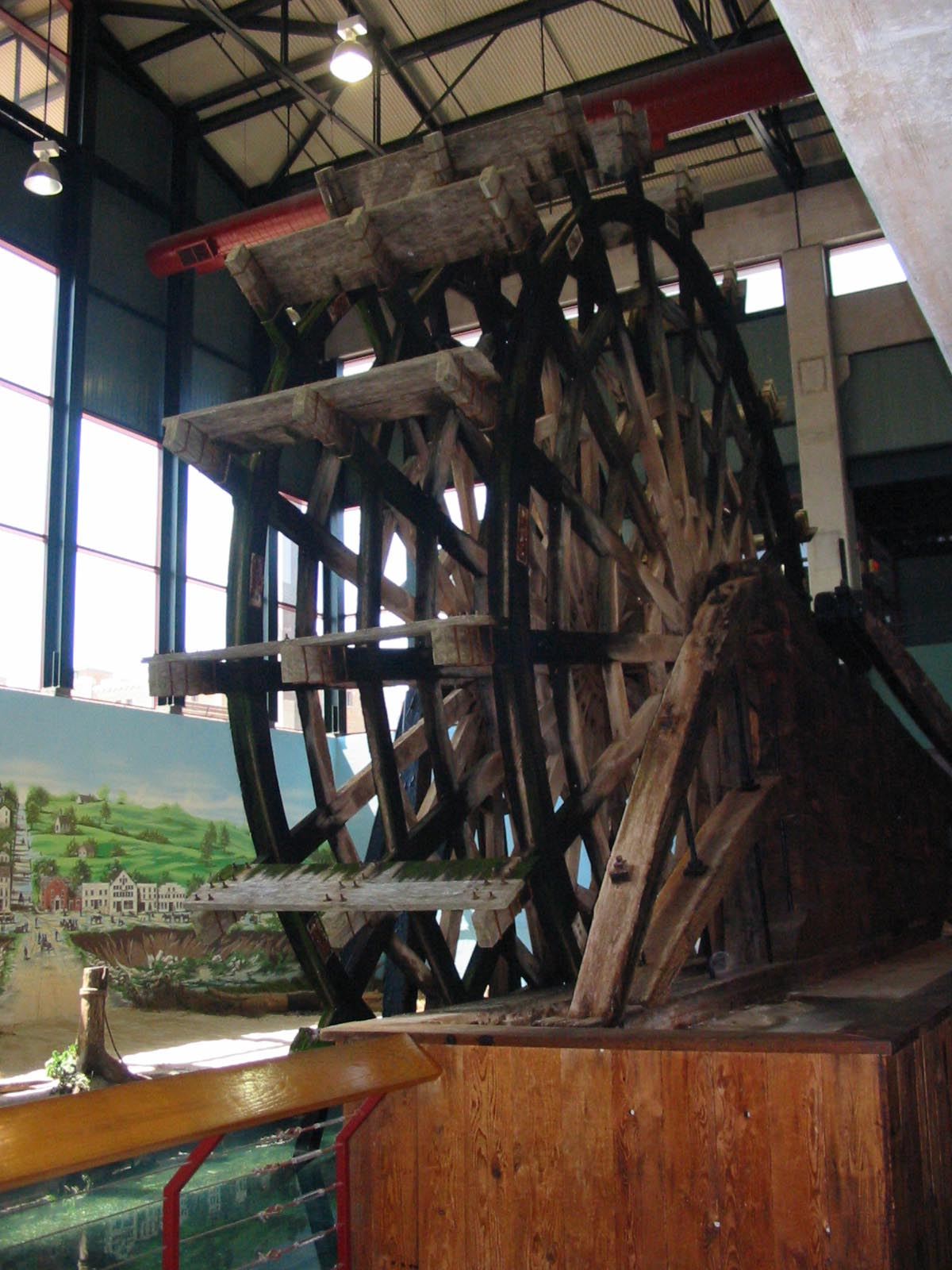
A recreation of the paddlewheel of Arabia is located at the Arabia Steamboat Museum in Kansas City. The actual paddlewheel was destroyed beyond repair.

The Arabia was built in 1853 around the Monongahela River in Brownsville, Pennsylvania. Its paddle wheels were 28 feet (8.5 m) across, and its steam boilers consumed approximately thirty cords of wood per day. It averaged 5 miles (8.0 km) per hour going upstream. It traveled the Ohio and Mississippi rivers, and was then bought by Captain John Shaw, who operated it on the Missouri River. Its first trip was to carry 109 soldiers from Fort Leavenworth to Fort Pierre, which was located up river in South Dakota. It then traveled up the Yellowstone River, adding 700 miles (1,100 km) to the trip. The trip totaled nearly three months.

In March 1856, the Arabia was stopped and searched by pro-slavery Border Ruffians near Lexington, Missouri. According to newspaper accounts at the time, a Pennsylvania abolitionist aboard the Arabia dropped a letter, which was discovered and handed over to Captain Shaw. The letter described guns and cannons en route to the slavery-free Kansas Territory from the abolitionist Massachusetts Aid Society. Boxes labeled "Carpenters Tools" containing 100 rifles and 2 cannons were confiscated.

Also in March 1856, the Arabia was sold to Captain William Terrill and William Boyd, and it made fourteen trips up and down the Missouri during their ownership. In March, it collided with a rock or a sand bar, nearly sinking with a damaged rudder. Repairs were made in nearby Portland, Missouri. A few weeks later, a cylinder head blew and was repaired.

=== Sinking ===
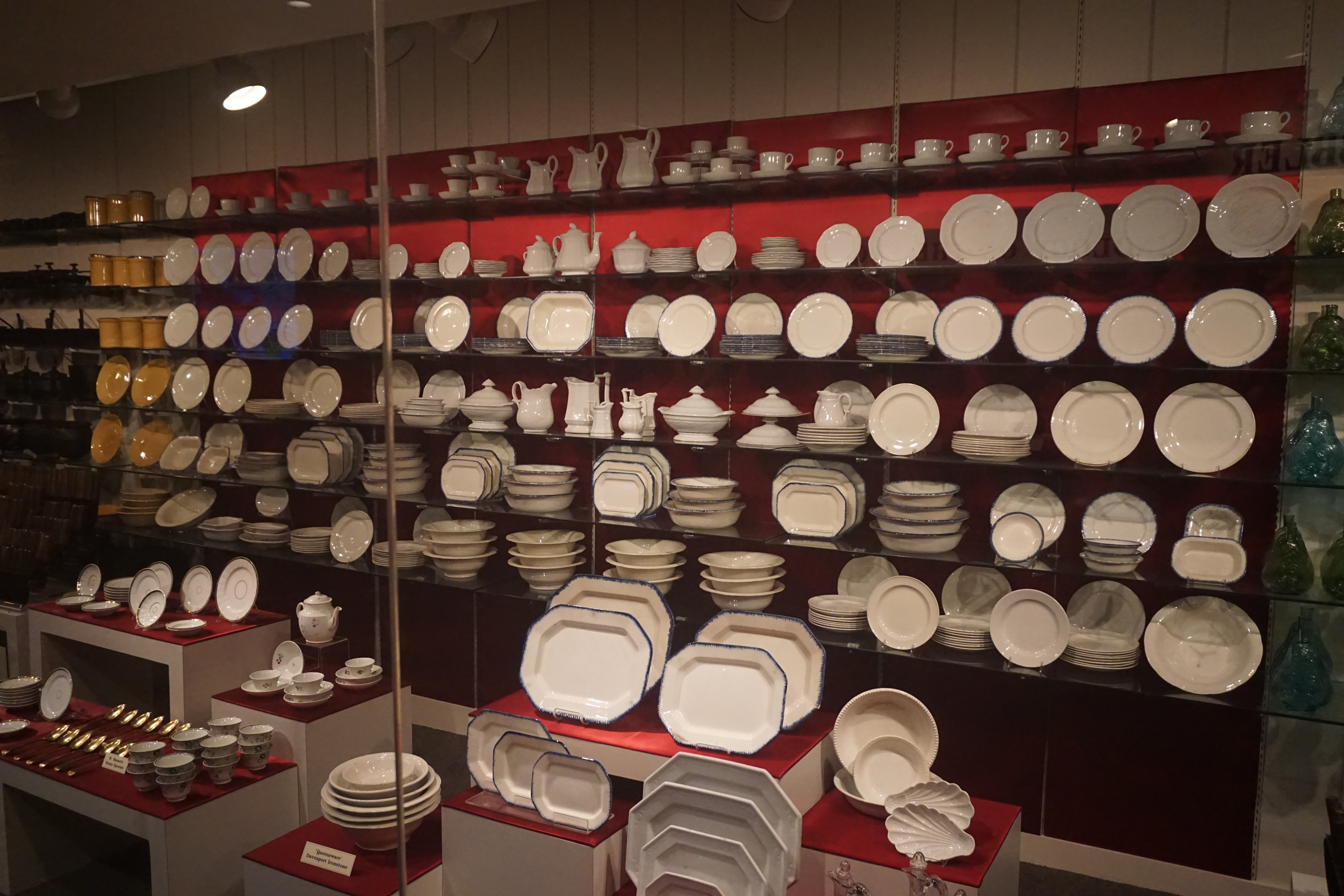
Dishes were recovered from the Arabia.

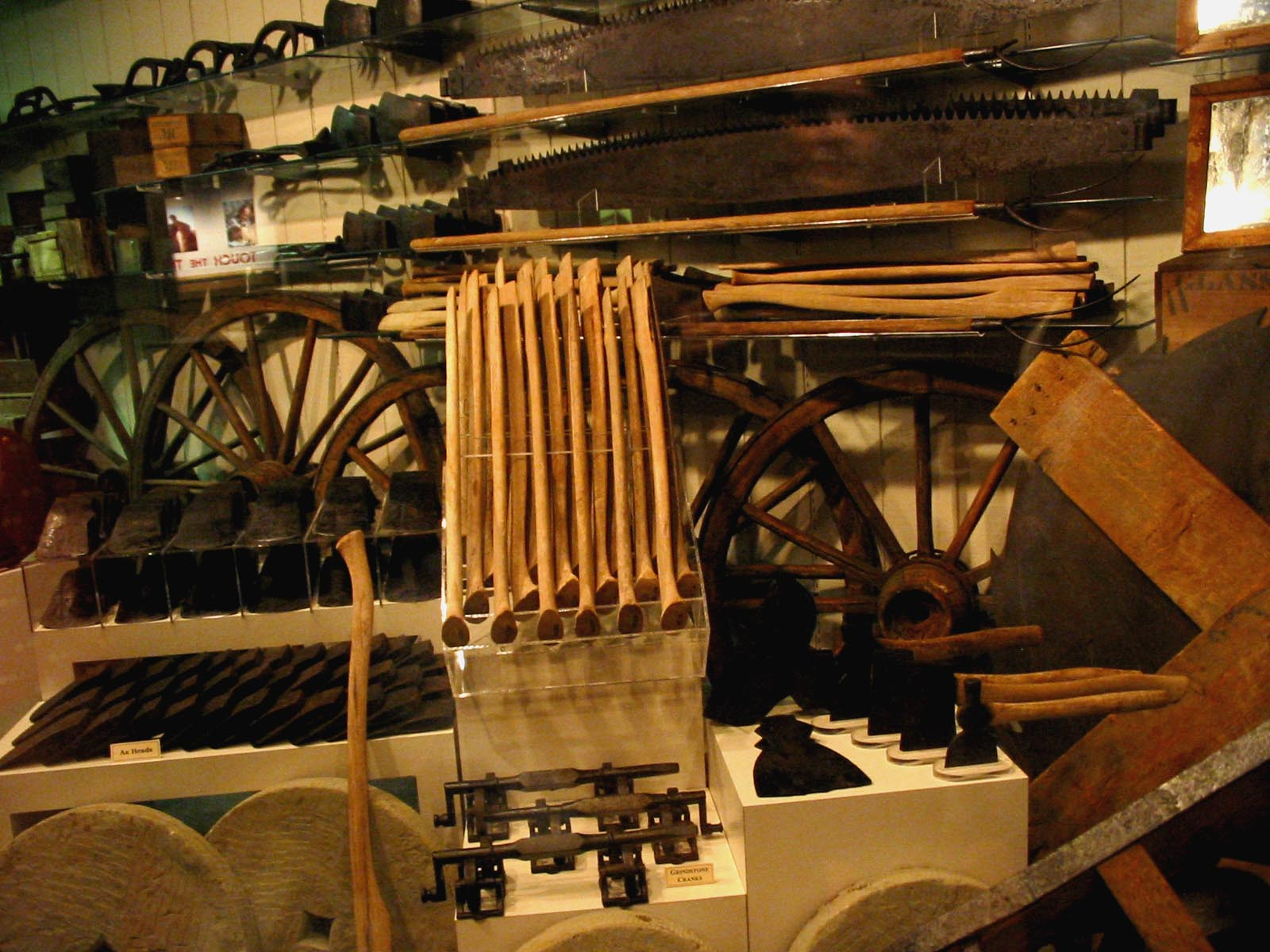
Cargo included wooden supplies.

On September 5, 1856, the Arabia set out for a routine trip. At Quindaro Bend, near Parkville, Missouri, it hit a submerged sycamore tree snag. The hull was ripped open and flooded with water. The upper decks stayed above water, and the only casualty was a mule that was tied to sawmill equipment below deck and overlooked.

The boat sank so rapidly into the mud that by the next morning, only the smokestacks and pilot house remained visible. Within a few days, these traces were also swept away. Numerous salvage attempts failed, and eventually the Arabia was completely covered by water.

Over time, the river shifted 0.5 miles (800 m) to the east. The site of the sinking is in a field within what became Kansas City, Kansas.

=== Excavation ===
In the 1860s, Elisha Sortor purchased the property where the Arabia lay. Over the years, legends were passed through the family that it was located somewhere under the land. In the surrounding town, stories were also told of it, but the exact location of it was lost over time.

In 1987, Bob Hawley and his sons, Greg and David, set out to find the Arabia. They used old maps and a proton magnetometer to figure out the probable location, and finally discovered it 0.5 miles (0.80 km) from the modern location of the river under 45 feet (14 m) of silt and topsoil.

The owners of the farm gave permission for excavation, with the condition that the work be completed before the spring planting. The Hawleys, along with family friends Jerry Mackey and David Luttrell, set out to excavate the Arabia during winter while the water table was at its lowest point. On November 13, 1988, they started excavating. They performed a series of drilling tests to exactly locate the hull, then marked the perimeter with powdered chalk. Heavy equipment, including a 100-ton crane, was brought in by both river and road transport during the summer and fall. Twenty irrigation pumps were installed around the site to lower the water level and to prevent flooding.

On November 26, 1988, the Arabia was exposed. Four days later, its artifacts began to appear, beginning with a vulcanized rubber overshoe. On December 5, a wooden crate filled with elegant china was unearthed. The mud was such an effective preserver that the yellow packing straw was still visible. Thousands of artifacts were recovered intact, including jars of preserved pickles that were still edible. Many pieces of the boat, including the boilers, one engine, and the anchor, were salvaged as well. The artifacts are housed in the Arabia Steamboat Museum. As of 2024, several tons of cargo are yet to go through the museum's preservation process.
