= Table Rock, Missouri =

- Former Village
- Location of Table Rock, Missouri
- Coordinates: 36°36′17″N 93°17′56″W
- Country: United States
- State: Missouri
- County: Taney
- Incorporated: 1968

Area
  - Total: 0.19 sq mi (0.5 km^{2})
  - Land: 0.19 sq mi (0.5 km^{2})
  - Water: 0 sq mi (0.0 km^{2})
- Elevation: 938 ft (286 m)

Population (2000)
  - Total: 229
  - Density: 1,094/sq mi (422.4/km^{2})
- Time zone: UTC-6 (Central (CST))
  - Summer (DST): UTC-5 (CDT)
- FIPS code: 29-72160
- GNIS feature ID: 0753046

Table Rock was a village in Taney County, Missouri, United States. At the 2000 census, the population was 229. It was part of the Branson, Missouri Micropolitan Statistical Area. It was located just east of the Table Rock Lake dam on the White River. It was approximately 5 miles (8.0 km) southwest from downtown Branson. In 2004, Table Rock was annexed by the city of Branson.

== Geography ==
The site was located just northeast of the Table Rock dam site on Missouri Route 165. The Pointe Royale Village and country club were to the southeast of the community. A bluff over the south side of the White River, roughly 1.5 miles (2.4 km) to the southeast along Route 165, is also known as Table Rock.

According to the United States Census Bureau, the village had a total area of 0.2 square miles (0.52 km^{2}), all land.

== Demographics ==
Historical population
Census	Pop.	Note	%±
1970	16		—
1980	58		262.5%
1990	100		72.4%
2000	229		129.0%
U.S. Decennial Census

At the 2000 census, there were 229 people, 96 households and 69 families residing in the village. The population density was 1,094.1 per square mile (422.4/km^{2}). There were 114 housing units at an average density of 544.7 per square mile (210.3/km^{2}). The racial make-up was 94.76% White, 0.44% African American, 0.87% Native American, and 3.93% from two or more races. Hispanic or Latino of any race were 4.80% of the population.

There were 96 households, of which 25.0% had children under the age of 18 living with them, 60.4% were married couples living together, 6.3% had a female householder with no husband present, and 28.1% were non-families. 20.8% of all households were made up of individuals, and 1.0% had someone living alone who was 65 years of age or older. The average household size was 2.39 and the average family size was 2.74.

18.3% of the population were under the age of 18, 7.0% from 18 to 24, 35.8% from 25 to 44, 26.6% from 45 to 64, and 12.2% who were 65 years of age or older. The median age was 41 years. For every 100 females, there were 89.3 males. For every 100 females age 18 and over, there were 94.8 males.

The median household income was $40,000 and the median family income was $55,417. Males had a median income of $31,250 and females $27,500. The per capita income was $20,846. About 2.9% of families and 5.7% of the population were below the poverty line, including 4.9% of those under the age of eighteen and 5.6% of those 65 or over.

The 2000 census was the last census for Table Rock, due to an annexation by the city of Branson in 2004. Beginning with the 2010 census, the area has been included in census data for Branson.
