= Reed/Niland Corner =

Gas station complex located in Colo, Iowa, US

Reed-Niland Corner
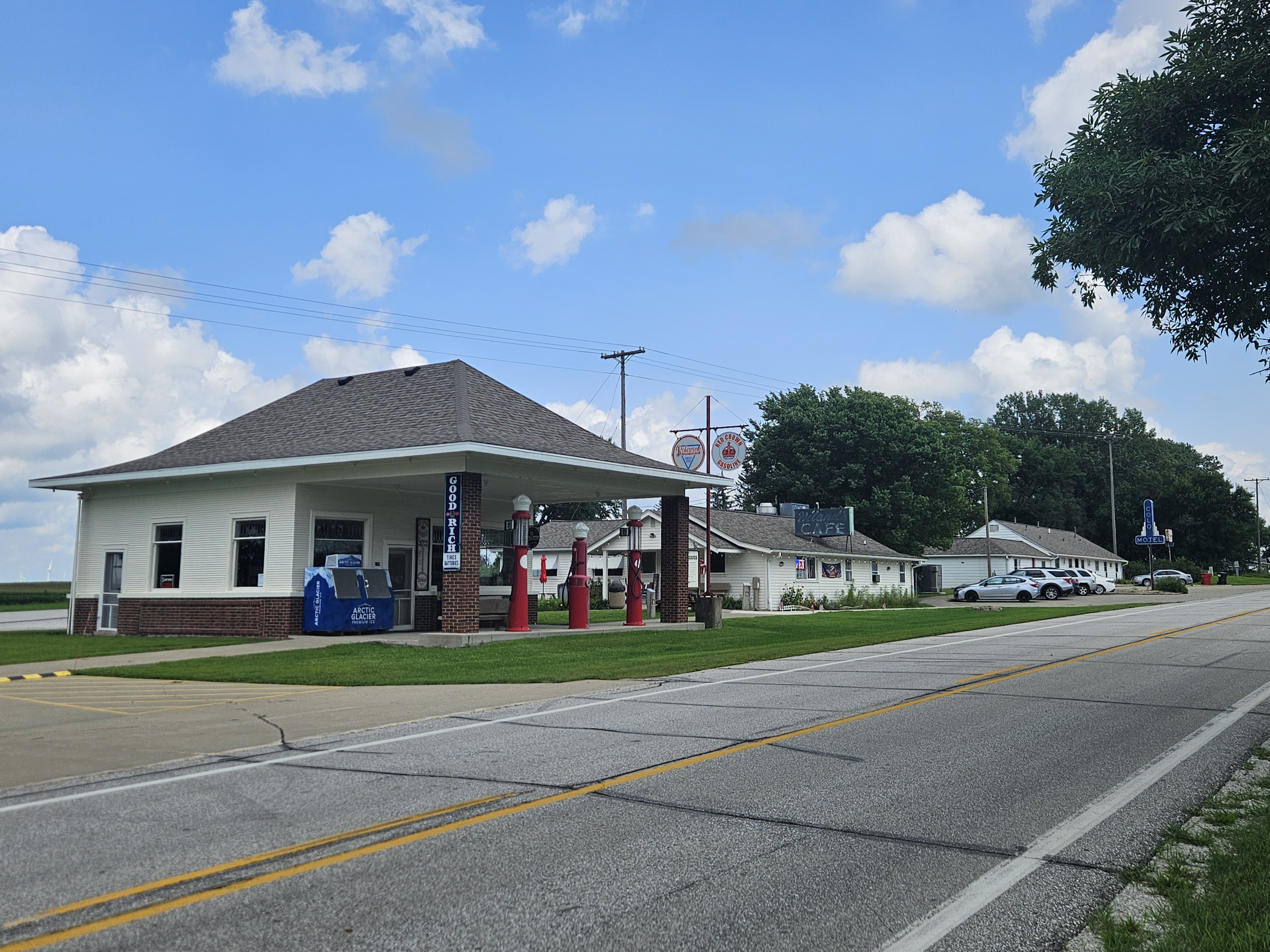
- Reed-Niland complex at the intersection of the Lincoln Highway and Jefferson Highway
- Location: 24 Lincoln Hwy, Colo, Iowa
- Built: 1923

The Reed-Niland Corner is a historic "One-Stop" gas station complex located in Colo, Iowa. The complex is located on the junction of the Lincoln Highway and the Jefferson Highway. The corner consists of a historic gas station, Niland's Cafe, and the Colo Motel. Today, it is one of the few surviving complete examples of this type of highway service complex in the United States.

== History ==
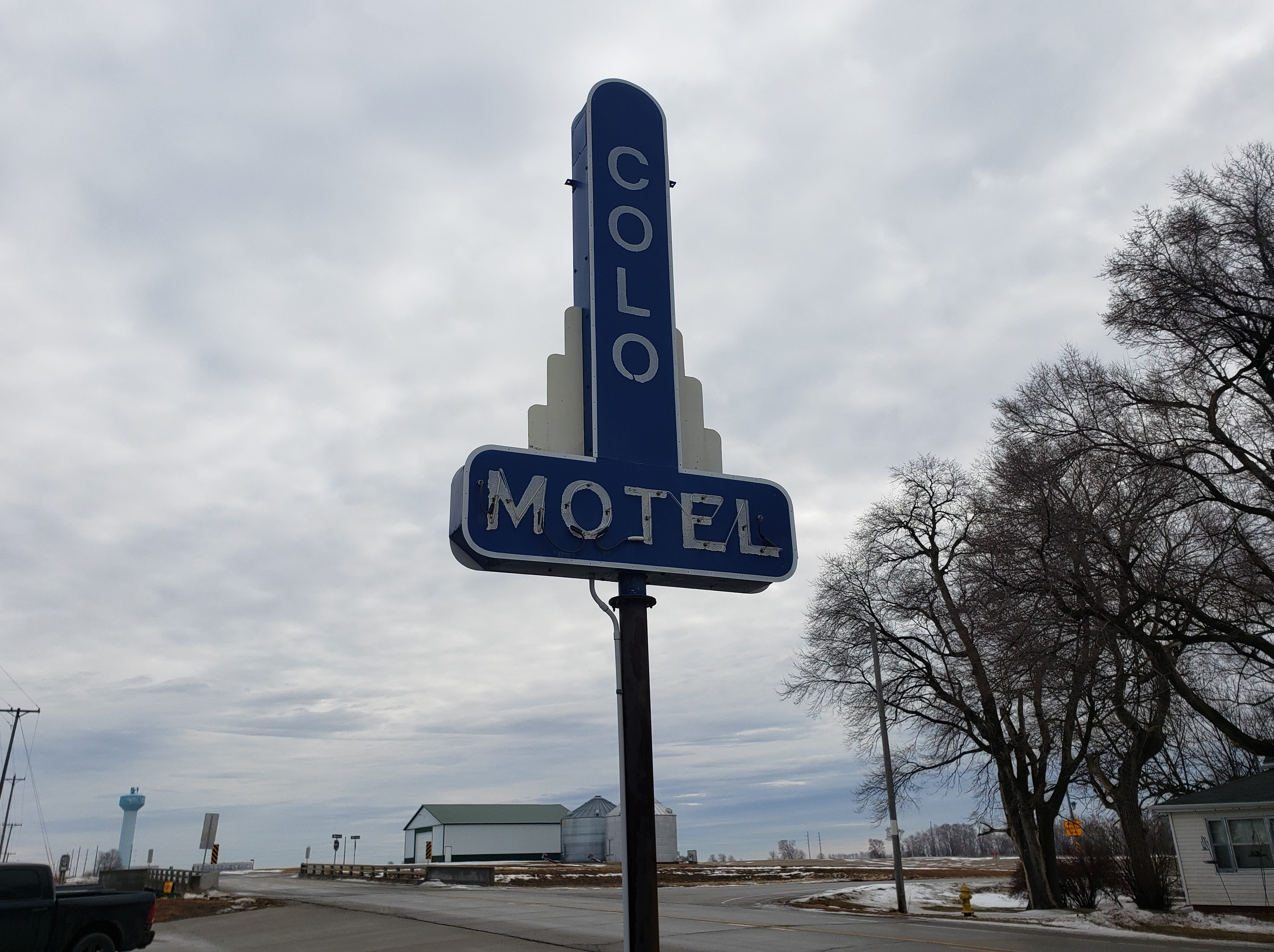
The sign for the Colo Motel as of 2023

Beginning life as a mere gas station in 1923 on the southeast corner of the property of local farmer Charlie Reed, the area quickly began attracting travels along both the Lincoln and Jefferson highways which it sits at the intersection of. Reed named his gas station the Lincoln-Jefferson Station (L&J for short), and soon after added cabins onto the property to accommodate travelers. A lunch stand turned cafe was built on the complex in 1926 with the help of Reed's nephew C. Reed Niland. In 1930 the locations of the gas station and cafe where shifted to where they currently are located. During the 1920s and early 1930s, the cafe and gas station at Reed/Niland corner was one of only a handful of stops open 24 hours a day along the Lincoln Highway. The cabins at the corner were replaced in 1947 by a motel. Charlie Reed died in 1967 with the gas station closing down not too long afterwards.

The cafe and motel continued to be operated by the Niland family until 1995 when it was gifted to the City of Colo. In June 2025, a non-profit organization named Reed-Niland Corner Inc was formed to help preserve the corner. This non-profit reached an agreement with the city to purchased the corner in March 2026. Niland's Cafe and the Colo Motel continue to serve the travelers of the Lincoln and Jefferson highways, as well as visitors attending regional events such as RAGBRAI. Charlie Reed's gas station has been converted into a museum, which is operated by the board of Reed-Niland Corner Inc.

== See also ==
- U.S. Route 30 in Iowa
- U.S. Route 65
