= G and G Veterinary Hospital =

- U.S. National Register of Historic Places
- Location within Missouri Location within the United States
- Location: 711 W. Main St., Sedalia, Missouri
- Coordinates: 38°42′43″N 93°14′04″W
- Area: less than one acre
- Built: 1937
- Built by: Hancock Construction
- Architect: Andrews, Lewis Paul
- Architectural style: Moderne
- NRHP reference No.: 11000186
- Added to NRHP: April 15, 2011

G and G Veterinary Hospital is a historic veterinary hospital located at Sedalia, Pettis County, Missouri. It was built in 1937, and is a small one-story, Art Moderne style concrete block building covered by stucco with a flat roof and raised basement. It features wrap around windows and a wide projecting center entrance block flanked by two wide fixed windows, with the name of the hospital spelled out in large wrought iron letters above. three generations of the family have practiced the same building since its construction.

It was listed on the National Register of Historic Places in 2011.
