= Williams Township, Benton County, Missouri =

Township in Benton County, Missouri, U.S.

Coordinates: 38.4475°N 93.1792°W

Williams Township is a township in Benton County, in the U.S. state of Missouri.

Williams Township was formed in February 1835, taking its name from Ezekiel Williams, a pioneer settler.
