= Waverly Bridge (Missouri) =

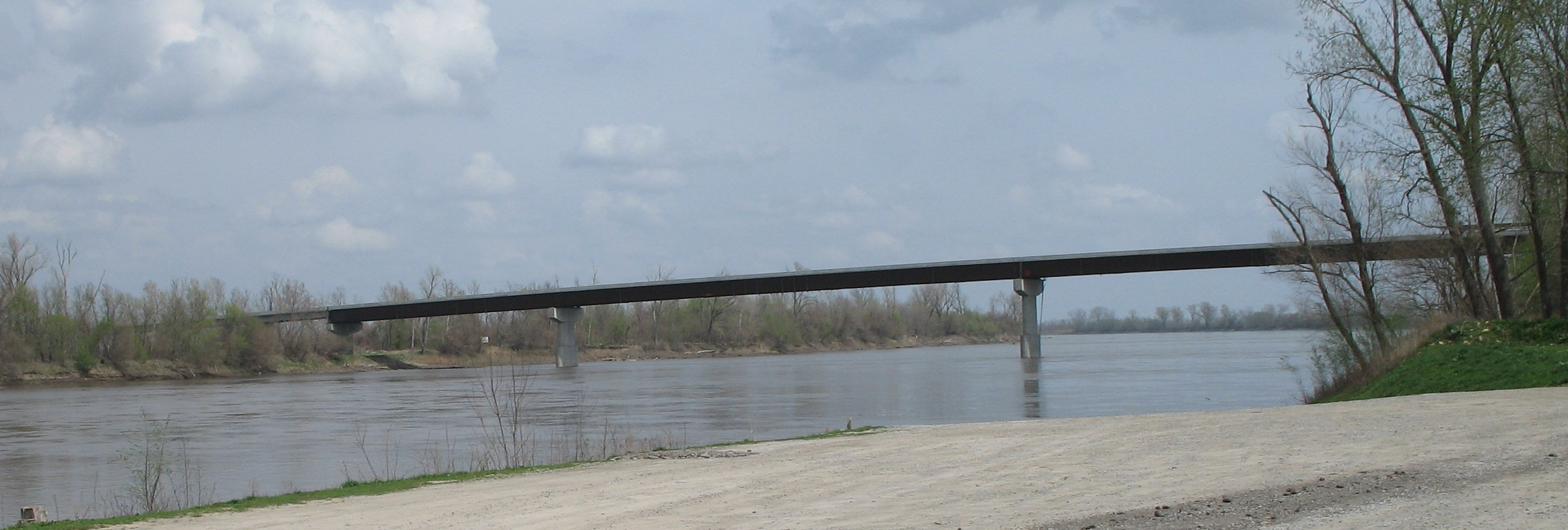
- The current Waverly Bridge from the southwest.
- Coordinates: 39.2160°N 93.5121°W
- Carries: US 24 / US 65
- Crosses: Missouri River
- Locale: Waverly, Missouri, United States

Location
- Interactive map of Waverly Bridge

The Waverly Bridge is a bridge at Waverly, Missouri, carrying US 24/US 65 over the Missouri River between Carroll County and Lafayette County in the U.S. state of Missouri.

The previous bridge on this site was built in 1922. Its main span was 419.2 feet (127.8 m) and total length was 1,942.4 feet (592.0 m). Its deck width was 20 feet (6.1 m) and it had a vertical clearance of 18.1 feet (5.5 m).

The current bridge opened on August 25, 2004, and the previous bridge was demolished in 2005.

== See also ==
- List of bridges documented by the Historic American Engineering Record in Missouri
- List of crossings of the Missouri River
