= Waverly, Missouri =

- City
- Location of Waverly, Missouri
- Coordinates: 39°12′26″N 93°31′07″W
- Country: United States
- State: Missouri
- County: Lafayette

Area
  - Total: 1.42 sq mi (3.68 km^{2})
  - Land: 1.26 sq mi (3.27 km^{2})
  - Water: 0.16 sq mi (0.41 km^{2})
- Elevation: 801 ft (244 m)

Population (2020)
  - Total: 784
  - Density: 621.5/sq mi (239.98/km^{2})
- Time zone: UTC-6 (Central (CST))
  - Summer (DST): UTC-5 (CDT)
- ZIP code: 64096
- Area code: 660
- FIPS code: 29-77866
- GNIS feature ID: 2397227
- Website: waverly-mo.com

Waverly is a city in Lafayette County, Missouri, and part of the Kansas City metropolitan area within the United States. As of the 2020 census, Waverly had a population of 784.

Waverly is the location of Baltimore Bend Winery, one of the many small wineries established in the state since the 1960s. The Waverly Bridge over the Missouri River is located near here. It is also home to General Jo Shelby, a hemp farmer who joined the Confederate cause in 1861.

== History ==
Waverly was founded in the 1840s. The community was named after Waverly, Illinois, the native home of an early settler. A post office called Waverly has been in operation since 1854.

The Napoleon Buck House was listed on the National Register of Historic Places in 1997.

== Geography ==
According to the United States Census Bureau, the city has a total area of 1.42 square miles (3.68 km^{2}), of which 1.26 square miles (3.26 km^{2}) is land and 0.16 square miles (0.41 km^{2}) is water.

== Demographics ==
Historical population
Census	Pop.	Note	%±
1870	887		—
1880	930		4.8%
1890	826		−11.2%
1900	722		−12.6%
1910	777		7.6%
1920	810		4.2%
1930	941		16.2%
1940	876		−6.9%
1950	809		−7.6%
1960	837		3.5%
1970	827		−1.2%
1980	941		13.8%
1990	837		−11.1%
2000	806		−3.7%
2010	849		5.3%
2020	784		−7.7%
U.S. Decennial Census

=== 2010 census ===
As of the census of 2010, there were 849 people, 317 households, and 215 families living in the city. The population density was 673.8 inhabitants per square mile (260.2/km^{2}). There were 362 housing units at an average density of 287.3 per square mile (110.9/km^{2}). The racial makeup of the city was 94.5% White, 2.1% African American, 0.2% Native American, 0.2% Asian, 2.1% from other races, and 0.8% from two or more races. Hispanic or Latino of any race were 6.1% of the population.

There were 317 households, of which 31.5% had children under the age of 18 living with them, 57.1% were married couples living together, 7.3% had a female householder with no husband present, 3.5% had a male householder with no wife present, and 32.2% were non-families. 27.8% of all households were made up of individuals, and 15.4% had someone living alone who was 65 years of age or older. The average household size was 2.44 and the average family size was 3.01.

The median age in the city was 40.6 years. 28.4% of residents were under the age of 18; 4.7% were between the ages of 18 and 24; 21.6% were from 25 to 44; 26.2% were from 45 to 64; and 18.8% were 65 years of age or older. The gender makeup of the city was 51.6% male and 48.4% female.

=== 2000 census ===
As of the census of 2000, there were 806 people, 314 households, and 204 families living in the city. The population density was 806.8 inhabitants per square mile (311.5/km^{2}). There were 369 housing units at an average density of 369.4 per square mile (142.6/km^{2}). The racial makeup of the city was 97.15% White, 0.74% African American, 0.12% Native American, 0.12% Asian, 0.50% from other races, and 1.36% from two or more races. Hispanic or Latino of any race were 1.24% of the population.

There were 314 households, out of which 26.8% had children under the age of 18 living with them, 55.1% were married couples living together, 7.3% had a female householder with no husband present, and 35.0% were non-families. 31.8% of all households were made up of individuals, and 16.9% had someone living alone who was 65 years of age or older. The average household size was 2.33 and the average family size was 2.93.

In the city the population was spread out, with 26.6% under the age of 18, 6.1% from 18 to 24, 22.8% from 25 to 44, 24.2% from 45 to 64, and 20.3% who were 65 years of age or older. The median age was 41 years. For every 100 females, there were 102.0 males. For every 100 females age 18 and over, there were 86.8 males.

The median income for a household in the city was $36,806, and the median income for a family was $43,654. Males had a median income of $30,729 versus $22,813 for females. The per capita income for the city was $17,066. About 7.1% of families and 10.4% of the population were below the poverty line, including 13.3% of those under age 18 and 11.5% of those age 65 or over.

== Education ==
It is in the Santa Fe R-X School District. The district operates one school in Waverly: Santa Fe Elementary School.

Waverly has a public library, a branch of the Trails Regional Library.

Metropolitan Community College has the Santa Fe school district area in its service area, but not its in-district taxation area.
