= Marshall Junction, Missouri =

- Unincorporated community
- Location within Missouri
- Coordinates: 38°57′29″N 93°12′24″W
- Country: United States
- State: Missouri
- County: Saline
- Elevation: 787 ft (240 m)
- Time zone: UTC-6 (Central (CST))
  - Summer (DST): UTC-5 (CDT)
- Area code: 660
- GNIS feature ID: 729337

Marshall Junction is an unincorporated community in Saline County, Missouri, United States. Marshall Junction is located at the junction of Interstate 70 and U.S. Route 65, 12 miles (19 km) south of Marshall.
