= Preston, Missouri =

Village in Hickory County, Missouri, United States

- Village
- Location of Preston, Missouri
- Coordinates: 37°56′27″N 93°12′46″W
- Country: United States
- State: Missouri
- County: Hickory

Area
  - Total: 0.75 sq mi (1.95 km^{2})
  - Land: 0.75 sq mi (1.95 km^{2})
  - Water: 0 sq mi (0.00 km^{2})
- Elevation: 1,066 ft (325 m)

Population (2020)
  - Total: 157
  - Density: 208.2/sq mi (80.38/km^{2})
- Time zone: UTC-6 (Central (CST))
  - Summer (DST): UTC-5 (CDT)
- ZIP code: 65732
- Area code: 417
- FIPS code: 29-59870
- GNIS feature ID: 2396866

Preston is a village in Hickory County, Missouri, United States. The population was 157 at the 2020 census.

== History ==
Preston was platted in 1857. Some say the community was named after Samuel Preston, a pioneer citizen, while others believe the name is a transfer from Preston, Pennsylvania. A post office called Preston has been in operation since 1881.

== Geography ==
According to the United States Census Bureau, the village has a total area of 0.75 square miles (1.94 km^{2}), all land.

== Demographics ==
Historical population
Census	Pop.	Note	%±
1880	32		—
1950	109		—
1960	117		7.3%
1970	132		12.8%
1980	149		12.9%
1990	136		−8.7%
2000	113		−16.9%
2010	223		97.3%
2020	157		−29.6%
U.S. Decennial Census

=== 2010 census ===
As of the census of 2010, there were 223 people, 104 households, and 58 families living in the village. The population density was 297.3 inhabitants per square mile (114.8/km^{2}). There were 121 housing units at an average density of 161.3 per square mile (62.3/km^{2}). The racial makeup of the village was 97.8% White, 0.4% African American, and 1.8% Native American.

There were 104 households, of which 20.2% had children under the age of 18 living with them, 48.1% were married couples living together, 2.9% had a female householder with no husband present, 4.8% had a male householder with no wife present, and 44.2% were non-families. 36.5% of all households were made up of individuals, and 16.3% had someone living alone who was 65 years of age or older. The average household size was 2.14 and the average family size was 2.84.

The median age in the village was 48.1 years. 17.5% of residents were under the age of 18; 9.3% were between the ages of 18 and 24; 17% were from 25 to 44; 34.1% were from 45 to 64; and 22% were 65 years of age or older. The gender makeup of the village was 54.7% male and 45.3% female.

=== 2000 census ===
As of the census of 2000, there were 113 people, 50 households, and 31 families living in the town. The population density was 666.4 inhabitants per square mile (257.3/km^{2}). There were 67 housing units at an average density of 395.1 per square mile (152.5/km^{2}). The racial makeup of the town was 100.00% White.

There were 50 households, out of which 30.0% had children under the age of 18 living with them, 48.0% were married couples living together, 14.0% had a female householder with no husband present, and 38.0% were non-families. 36.0% of all households were made up of individuals, and 18.0% had someone living alone who was 65 years of age or older. The average household size was 2.26 and the average family size was 3.00.

In the town the population was spread out, with 26.5% under the age of 18, 8.0% from 18 to 24, 16.8% from 25 to 44, 28.3% from 45 to 64, and 20.4% who were 65 years of age or older. The median age was 43 years. For every 100 females, there were 76.6 males. For every 100 females age 18 and over, there were 72.9 males.

The median income for a household in the town was $19,583, and the median income for a family was $19,583. Males had a median income of $20,313 versus $16,250 for females. The per capita income for the town was $11,318. There were 31.0% of families and 30.5% of the population living below the poverty line, including 37.1% of under eighteens and 17.4% of those over 64.

== See also ==
- List of cities in Missouri
