= National Register of Historic Places listings in Laclede County, Missouri =

Location of Laclede County in Missouri

This is a list of the National Register of Historic Places listings in Laclede County, Missouri.

This is intended to be a complete list of the properties and districts on the National Register of Historic Places in Laclede County, Missouri, United States. Latitude and longitude coordinates are provided for many National Register properties and districts; these locations may be seen together in a map.

There are 7 properties and districts listed on the National Register in the county, and one former listing.

This National Park Service list is complete through NPS recent listings posted April 4, 2025.

== Current listings ==
| | Name on the Register | Image | Date listed | Location | City or town | Description |
|---|---|---|---|---|---|---|
| 1 | Bennett Spring State Park Hatchery-Lodge Area Historic District | Bennett Spring State Park Hatchery-Lodge Area Historic District | March 4, 1985 (#85000504) | Route A64; 37°43′31″N 92°51′24″W | Bennett Spring | |
| 2 | Ralph E. Burley House | Ralph E. Burley House | July 7, 1994 (#94000704) | 389 S. Adams Ave. 37°40′44″N 92°39′36″W | Lebanon | |
| 3 | Joe Knight Building | Joe Knight Building | September 6, 2005 (#05000995) | 201 W. Commercial St. 37°40′47″N 92°39′55″W | Lebanon | |
| 4 | Missouri Farmers Association - Producers Creamery Company Dairy Plant | | April 9, 2025 (#100011654) | 1201 Ice Cream Way; 37°40′13″N 92°40′25″W | Lebanon | |
| 5 | Ploger-Moneymaker Place | Ploger-Moneymaker Place | September 23, 1982 (#82003150) | 291 Harwood Ave. 37°41′08″N 92°39′47″W | Lebanon | |
| 6 | The Rice-Stix Building | | July 25, 2019 (#100004220) | 200 E. Commercial St. 37°40′54″N 92°39′45″W | Lebanon | |
| 7 | Wallace House | Wallace House | March 22, 1984 (#84002579) | 230 Harwood Ave. 37°41′05″N 92°39′46″W | Lebanon | |

== Former listings ==
| | Name on the Register | Image | Date listed | Date removed | Location | City or town | Description |
|---|---|---|---|---|---|---|---|
| 1 | Laclede County Jail | Laclede County Jail | March 27, 1980 (#80002372) | February 4, 2022 | Adams and 3rd Sts. 37°40′59″N 92°39′52″W | Lebanon | Demolished in 2021. |

== See also ==
- List of National Historic Landmarks in Missouri
- National Register of Historic Places listings in Missouri
