= Missouri Route 83 =

State highway in Missouri, U.S.

Route 83
- MO 83 highlighted in red

Route information
- Maintained by MoDOT
- Length: 57.309 mi (92.230 km)

Major junctions
- North end: US 65 / Route 7 at Warsaw
- US 54 in Wheatland
- South end: Route 13 in Bolivar

Location
- Country: United States
- State: Missouri

Highway system
- Missouri State Highway System; Interstate; US; State; Supplemental
← Route 82	→ Route 84

Route 83 is a state highway in western Missouri. Its northern terminus is at U.S. Route 65/Route 7 at Warsaw; its southern terminus is at Route 13 in Bolivar. It is a two-lane highway its entire length.

== Major intersections ==
County	Location	mi	km	Destinations	Notes
Polk	Bolivar	0.000	0.000	Route 13 / Route 13 Bus. begins – Humansville, Springfield	Southern end of Route 13 Business overlap
Polk	Bolivar	2.986	4.806	Route 32 (Broadway Street) / Route 13 Bus. north	Northern end of Route 13 Business overlap
Hickory	Tyler Township	25.101	40.396	Route 254 east – Galmey, Pomme de Terre Dam	
Hickory	Wheatland	29.009	46.685	US 54 east – Hermitage	Eastern end of US 54 overlap
Hickory	Montgomery Township	33.043	53.178	US 54 west – Weaubleau	Western end of US 54 overlap
Hickory–Benton county line	Montgomery–Alexander township line	42.455	68.325	Route 82 west – Osceola	
Benton	White Branch	57.309	92.230	US 65 / Route 7 – Warsaw, Springfield	
1.000 mi = 1.609 km; 1.000 km = 0.621 mi: Concurrency terminus
