= Missouri Route 64 =

State highway in Missouri, U.S.

Route 64
- Route 64 highlighted in red Route 64A highlighted in blue Route 64B highlighted in green

Route information
- Maintained by MoDOT
- Length: 51.290 mi (82.543 km)
- Existed: 1922–present

Major junctions
- West end: Route 254 near Pomme de Terre Lake
- US 65 in Louisburg; Route 73 at Pumpkin Center
- East end: Route 5 in Lebanon

Location
- Country: United States
- State: Missouri

Highway system
- Missouri State Highway System; Interstate; US; State; Supplemental
← I-64	→ US 65

Route 64 is a highway in central Missouri with endpoints of Route 254 south of Hermitage and Route 5 in Lebanon.

Route 64 is one of the original 1922 state highways and originally ran between Preston and Collins. It would eventually be moved further to the south with its older alignment becoming U.S. Route 54. It would also be extended east.

== Major intersections ==
County	Location	mi	km	Destinations	Notes
Hickory		0.000	0.000	Route 254 – Hermitage, Galmey	Western terminus
Hickory		0.895	1.440	Route RD	Eastern terminus of Route RD
Hickory	Nemo	3.128	5.034	Route D / Route NN to US 65 – Preston	Western terminus of Route NN
Hickory		5.592	8.999	Route 64B – Pomme de Terre State Park	Southern terminus of Route 64B
Hickory	Pittsburg	7.276	11.710	Route J	Eastern terminus of Route J
Hickory		8.040	12.939	Route RA	Western terminus of Route RA
Hickory–Polk county line		9.331	15.017	Route TT	Eastern terminus of Route TT
Polk		12.615	20.302	Route D / Route RB – Polk	Northern terminus of Route RB, Southern is D
Polk		15.945	25.661	Route HH to US 65	Southern terminus of Route HH
Polk		17.984	28.942	Route P – Halfway	Northern terminus of Route P
Dallas	Louisburg	21.956	35.335	US 65 – Urbana, Buffalo	
Dallas		24.214	38.969	Route U	Southern terminus of Route U
Dallas		25.740	41.425	Route 73 – Buffalo, Tunas	
Dallas		28.775	46.309	Route T – Lead Mine	Southern terminus of Route T
Dallas		32.033	51.552	Route K – Windyville	Northern terminus of Route K
Laclede		40.891	65.808	Route 64A – Bennett Springs	Eastern terminus of Route 64A
Laclede		46.977	75.602	Route KK	Eastern terminus of Route KK
Laclede		48.184	77.545	Route AA	Southern terminus of Route AA
Laclede	Lebanon	51.291	82.545	Route 5 / Route 32 – Camdenton	Eastern terminus
1.000 mi = 1.609 km; 1.000 km = 0.621 mi

== Related routes ==
Route 64 is the only Missouri highway with lettered branches.

=== Route 64A ===
Route 64A
- Location: Bennett Spring State Park
- Length: 1.509 mi (2.429 km)

Route 64A is a 1.5-mile-long (2.4 km) spur off Route 64 which ends in Bennett Spring State Park. When Route 64 was on its old alignment, another Route 64A went north to the Benton/Hickory county line and is now part of Route 83.

The entire route is in Bennett Spring State Park.

County	mi	km	Destinations	Notes
Laclede	0.000	0.000	Bennett Springs State Park Road 22	Western terminus
Laclede	0.024	0.039	Route OO	Northern terminus of Route OO
Dallas	No major junctions			
Laclede	1.509	2.429	Route 64 to Route 73 – Lebanon	Eastern terminus
1.000 mi = 1.609 km; 1.000 km = 0.621 mi

=== Route 64B ===
Route 64B
- Location: Pomme de Terre State Park
- Length: 2.257 mi (3.632 km)

Route 64B is a 2.2-mile-long (3.5 km) spur off Route 64 between Nemo and Pittsburg. It ends at Pomme de Terre Lake.

The entire route is in Hickory County.

Location	mi	km	Destinations	Notes
Pomme de Terre State Park	0.000	0.000	Pomme de Terre State Park	Western terminus at park entrance
	2.257	3.632	Route 64 – Nemo, Pittsburg	Eastern terminus
1.000 mi = 1.609 km; 1.000 km = 0.621 mi
