= Missouri Route 254 =

State highway in Missouri, U.S.

Route 254

Route information
- Maintained by MoDOT
- Length: 10.247 mi (16.491 km)

Major junctions
- West end: Route 83 south of Wheatland
- East end: US 54 in Hermitage

Location
- Country: United States
- State: Missouri
- Counties: Hickory

Highway system
- Missouri State Highway System; Interstate; US; State; Supplemental
← Route 249	→ Route 265

Route 254 is a short highway in Hickory County, Missouri with endpoints at U.S. Route 54 (US 54) in Hermitage and Route 83 south of Wheatland. The highway crosses the Pomme de Terre Lake dam.

== Route description ==
Route 254 begins at an intersection with Route 83 south of Wheatland, heading east on a two-lane undivided road. The route passes through agricultural areas with some trees, turning south before heading east. The road heads into more wooded areas with some development, curving northeast before turning back to the east and passing through the community of Galmey. Route 254 curves southeast and east through more woodland with some homes. The road curves northeast before a turn to the east, passing to the north of Pomme de Terre Lake. The route heads northeast and crosses the Pomme de Terre Dam, which forms the lake. Route 254 heads east through more woods and passes a few businesses before coming to an intersection with the western terminus of Route 64. Here, Route 254 turns to the north before curving northwest and passing through a mix of fields and woods with some development. The road heads north through more rural areas before entering Hermitage, where it becomes Jackson Street and passes homes and businesses. Route 254 comes to its eastern terminus at an intersection with US 54.

== Major intersections ==
The entire route is in Hickory County.

Location	mi	km	Destinations	Notes
Wheatland	0.000	0.000	Route 83	
	7.202	11.590	Route 64 east	
Hermitage	10.247	16.491	US 54	
1.000 mi = 1.609 km; 1.000 km = 0.621 mi
