= Montgomery Township, Hickory County, Missouri =

Inactive township in Hickory County, Missouri

Coordinates: 38.0075592°N 93.4673365°W

Montgomery Township is an inactive township in Hickory County, in the U.S. state of Missouri. It was named after Judge Joseph C. Montgomery.

== Geography ==
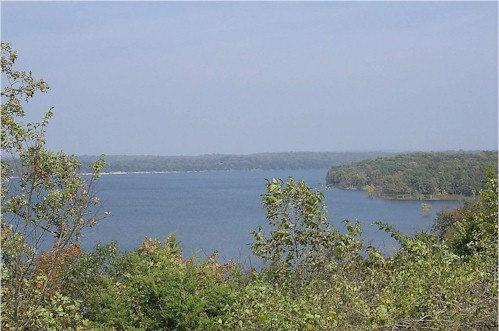
The Pomme de Terre River

Montgomery Township borders Wheatland Township on the east, Weaubleau Township on the south, and Tyler Township, also on the south.

=== Water bodies ===
- Little Pomme de Terre River: A branch of the Pomme de Terre River. It rises in southern Wheatland, north through Montgomery into Benton, and then joins the Pomme de Terre River near Fairfield.
- Montgomery Branch: A river that rises in central Wheatland, flows northwest into Montgomery, and then empties into the Little Pomme de Terre River.
- Weaubleau Creek: The creek enters Tyler Township from Polk County. It flows into southwest Montgomery and then into St. Clair County before joining the Osage River.

== Buildings ==
=== Education ===
- Miller School: In central Montgomery. It was named after an early settler in the area.
- Cross Lane School: Named because of its proximity to a crossroads.
- Prairie Grove School: In west Montgomery. Another name for it is Wilson School, named after a family in the area.
- Quincy School: In central Montgomery. It was named after the town.
- Union School: Borders on northwest Montgomery and Benton. It was named after the fact that the school is located in two counties.

=== Post offices ===
- Bledsoe: A post office functional in 1867–1868, in southern Montgomery. It was named after Bledsoe Montgomery, a son of judge Joseph C. Montgomery. When Montgomery Township gave up eastern sections in the formation of western Wheatland Township in 1881, the village of Wheatland located three miles to its south became the site of the post office servicing Bledsoe's old postal customers.
- Quincy: A post office functional in 1867–1868 and 1886, in central Montgomery. The area was settled in 1833 and platted by Isaac M. Cruce in 1848. It was most likely named after John Quincy Adams, the 6th president of the United States. The area was called ″Judy's Gap″ before it was platted since a blacksmith named Samuel Judy had set up a shop there. The ″Gap″ comes from the opening between the two prairies in the area; Hogle Creek Prairie and 25-Mile Prairie.
