= Atchley, Missouri =

Human settlement in Missouri, United States of America

Coordinates: 37°44′12″N 92°42′24″W

Atchley is a former community in Laclede County, in the U.S. state of Missouri. The community was located approximately four miles northwest of Lebanon and 1.5 miles west of Missouri Route 5, roughly at the intersection of present day Hancock Road and Oaklawn Dr. Its land is now entirely under private ownership, for farming. The Atchley Cemetery lies west of Goodwin Hollow Creek.

== History ==
The community was named for John Eubank Atchley, a pioneer settler. A post office was established there in 1902, and remained in operation until 1905.
