= Wheatland Township, Hickory County, Missouri =

Township in Hickory County, Missouri

Coordinates: 37.9872°N 93.3919°W

Wheatland Township is an inactive township in Hickory County, in the U.S. state of Missouri.

Wheatland Township was established in 1881 from eastern sections of Montgomery Township and western sections of Cross Timbers Township, taking its name from the community of Wheatland, Missouri within its bounds.
