= Lindley Creek =

Stream in Missouri, US

Lindley Creek is a stream in Dallas, Hickory and Polk counties the U.S. state of Missouri. It is a tributary of the Pomme de Terre River.

The stream headwaters arise on the east flank of Blue Mound in eastern Polk County at 37°34′50″N 93°10′46″W and an elevation of approximately 1220 feet. The stream flows generally north passing under Missouri Route 32 about two miles west of Buffalo. About four miles to the north the stream turn to the west and enters Polk County. The stream flows northwest and turns north as it passes under Missouri Route 64 just east of Mohawk Corner. The stream enters Hickory County and enters the waters of Pomme de Terre Lake. The original confluence with the Pomme de Terre River was at 37°53′29″N 93°18′36″W at an elevation of 760 feet.

Lindley Creek has the name of one Mr. Lindley, a pioneer who became stuck due to severe weather and had to winter in the area.

== See also ==
- List of rivers of Missouri
