= White Cloud, Missouri =

Unincorporated community in Missouri, U.S.

Coordinates: 38°01′16″N 93°22′24″W

White Cloud is an unincorporated community in Hickory County, in the U.S. state of Missouri. It is north-northwest of Hermitage, Missouri, the county seat.

The community most likely was named after Chief Mahaska (1784–1843), or Mewhushekaw, also known as White Cloud.
