= John Siddle Williams House =

Historic house in Missouri, United States

- U.S. National Register of Historic Places
- Location within Missouri Location within the United States
- Location: Off U.S. 54, Hermitage, Missouri
- Coordinates: 37°56′33″N 93°19′10″W
- Area: less than one acre
- Built: c. 1855
- NRHP reference No.: 80002356
- Added to NRHP: September 27, 1980

John Siddle Williams House, also known as the Hickory County Museum , is a historic home located at Hermitage, Hickory County, Missouri, USA. It was built about 1855, and is a two-story, L-shaped, brick I-house. It rests on a stone foundation and features double galleries on the front and rear facades. It became the Hickory County Museum in 1976.

It was listed on the National Register of Historic Places on September 27, 1980.
