= Tyler Township =

Tyler Township may refer to:

- Tyler Township, Perry County, Arkansas
- Tyler Township, Prairie County, Arkansas
- Tyler Township, Hickory County, Missouri
- Tyler Township, Craig County, Oklahoma (historical)
