= Quincy, Missouri =

Unincorporated community in Missouri, U.S.

Coordinates: 38°00′30″N 93°28′21″W

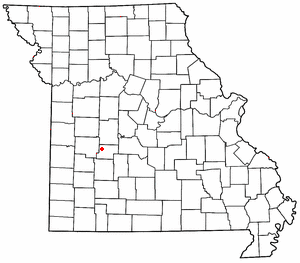

Quincy is a small unincorporated community in northwestern Hickory County, Missouri, United States. It is located on Route 83, north of U.S. Route 54. A post office and a few homes are located there and was a Relay Station on the Butterfield Overland Mail Route. Map created from US Department of the Interior Bureau of Land Management Original Surveys 1835 & 1845

Quincy was platted in 1848. The community most likely was named after U.S. President John Quincy Adams. A post office called Quincy has been in operation since 1850.

The Quincy post office originally provided service in central Montgomery Township, while a post office at Bledsoe provided for southernmost Montgomery Township.

Quincy Public Hall was listed on the National Register of Historic Places in 1995.

== Notable person ==
- Elijah S. Grammer, US Senator from Washington state

== Other sources ==
- Butterfield Overland Mail Route 1858-1861 Period on a Campbell's 1873 Map by Gregory Wadley
- US Department of the Interior Bureau of Land Management Original Surveys 1835 & 1845
