= Quincy Public Hall =

- U.S. National Register of Historic Places
- Location within Missouri Location within the United States
- Location: MO 83, Quincy, Missouri
- Coordinates: 38°0′31″N 93°28′17″W
- Area: less than one acre
- Built by: Brent, Romeo V.; Baldwin, L. W.
- NRHP reference No.: 95000370
- Added to NRHP: April 7, 1995

Quincy Public Hall, also known as the Quincy City Hall and Quincy Community Building , is a historic city hall located at Quincy, Hickory County, Missouri. It was completed in 1917, the hall is a one-story frame building measuring 45 feet by 26 feet. It sits on a flat stone foundation and has a high gable roof. It features a concrete entrance porch sheltered by a belfry supported by hand hewn wooden posts. The building serves as the center of the social, religious, educational, and civic structure of the hamlet of Quincy.

It was listed on the National Register of Historic Places in 1995.
