= Wheatland High School =

Wheatland High School may refer to:

- Wheatland High School (California), in Wheatland, California
- Wheatland High School, in Grainfield, Kansas
- Wheatland High School (Missouri), in Wheatland, Missouri
- Wheatland High School (Wyoming), in Wheatland, Wyoming

== See also ==
- Calamus–Wheatland High School, in Wheatland, Iowa
