= Helen Beck =

Helen Beck may refer to:

- Sally Rand (1904–1979), American dancer, née Helen Gould Beck
- Violet Hélène Beck (1905–1971), wife of Peter Cushing
