= Weaubleau Christian College =

Former college in Missouri, U.S.

Weaubleau Christian Institute was founded in 1873 in Hickory County, Missouri, under the auspices of the Weaubleau Congregational Christian Church. The congregation of the church was made up of families living on newly settled farms, who chose a central location on which to erect a 2-story building large enough to accommodate a church on the first floor and an academy or secondary school on the second. A small town, first called Haran, but later renamed Weaubleau for the stream upon which it is located, grew up around the Church and Institute.

The institute was incorporated under a board of trustees, the majority of whom were to be perpetually drawn from among the members of the church. The student body never exceeded 15) at any point in the schools' first 35 years. One of the college's Presidents, John Whitaker, called it a "frontier college," and wrote that many of the student taught terms in frontier schools to earn their tuition fees.

The Institute gained accreditation as a college around 1893, eventually granting three degrees: Bachelor of Science, Bachelor of Accounts, and master's degree.

The college closed in 1914. Some papers related to the college and the Church are held by the State Historical Society of Missouri.
