= Pittsburg, Missouri =

Unincorporated community in Missouri, U.S.

Coordinates: 37°50′02″N 93°18′02″W

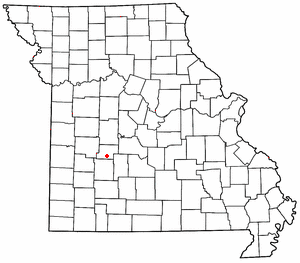

Pittsburg is an unincorporated community in Hickory County, Missouri, United States. It is located approximately ten miles south of Hermitage on Route 64. The community lies on the shores of Pomme de Terre Lake. The ZIP Code for Pittsburg is 65724.

== History ==
A post office called Pittsburg has been in operation since 1846. Pittsburg was named for the Pitts family of early settlers.
