= Pomme de Terre State Park =

State park in Missouri, United States

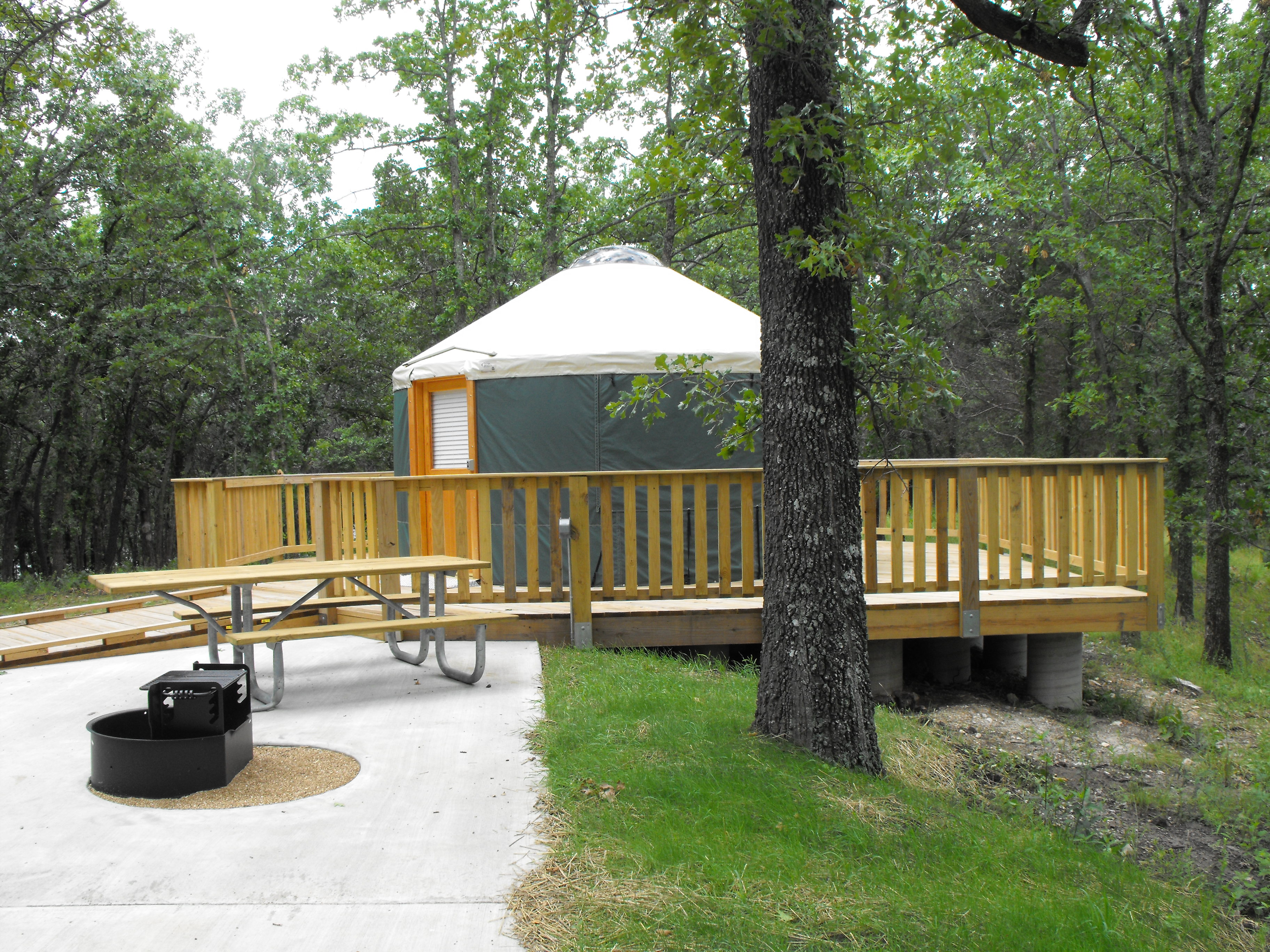

- Location within Missouri Location within the United States
- Location: Hickory County, Missouri, United States
- Coordinates: 37°52′24″N 93°19′25″W
- Area: 734.44 acres (297.22 ha)
- Elevation: 869 ft (265 m)
- Established: 1960
- Administrator: Missouri Department of Natural Resources
- Visitors: 250,201 (in 2023)
- Website: Official website

Pomme de Terre State Park (pronounced /ˌpʌm də ˈtɑːr/ PUM də TAR) is a public recreation area in the U.S. state of Missouri consisting of 734.44 acres (297.22 ha) located on Pomme de Terre Lake in Hickory County. The state park features a marina, campgrounds, swimming beaches, and hiking trails.
