= Elkton, Missouri =

Unincorporated community in Missouri, U.S.

Coordinates: 37°51′09″N 93°25′34″W

Elkton is an unincorporated community in Hickory County, in the U.S. state of Missouri.

== History ==
A post office at Elkton was established in 1845, and remained in operation until 1955. The post office was a Flag Stop during the Butterfield Overland Mail period 1858–1861. Yoast Station was just 2.2 mi south of the post office and was a horse change-over for the Butterfield Stagecoach. The community was named for the abundance of deer near the original town site.

== Notable person ==
Hattie Helen Gould Beck (stage name Sally Rand), an early movie and stage star, was born at Elkton in 1904.
