= Weaubleau Township, Hickory County, Missouri =

Township in Missouri

Coordinates: 37.8694°N 93.5244°W

Weaubleau Township (/ˈwɒbloʊ/ WOB-loh) is an inactive township in Hickory County, in the U.S. state of Missouri.

Weaubleau Township was established in 1881, taking its name from a creek of the same name within its borders. The city of Weaubleau is located within the township.
