= Weaubleau egg =

Type of rock found near Weaubleau, Missouri, U.S.

Weaubleau eggs are a type of rock which only forms in the area around Weaubleau, Missouri. They are spherical nodules, composed primarily of chert nucleated around siltstone clasts from the Northview Formation. These nodules have been found as far away as Newton County, Missouri, approximately 125 miles southwest of the impact area.
