= Bennett Spring State Park =

State park in Missouri, U.S.

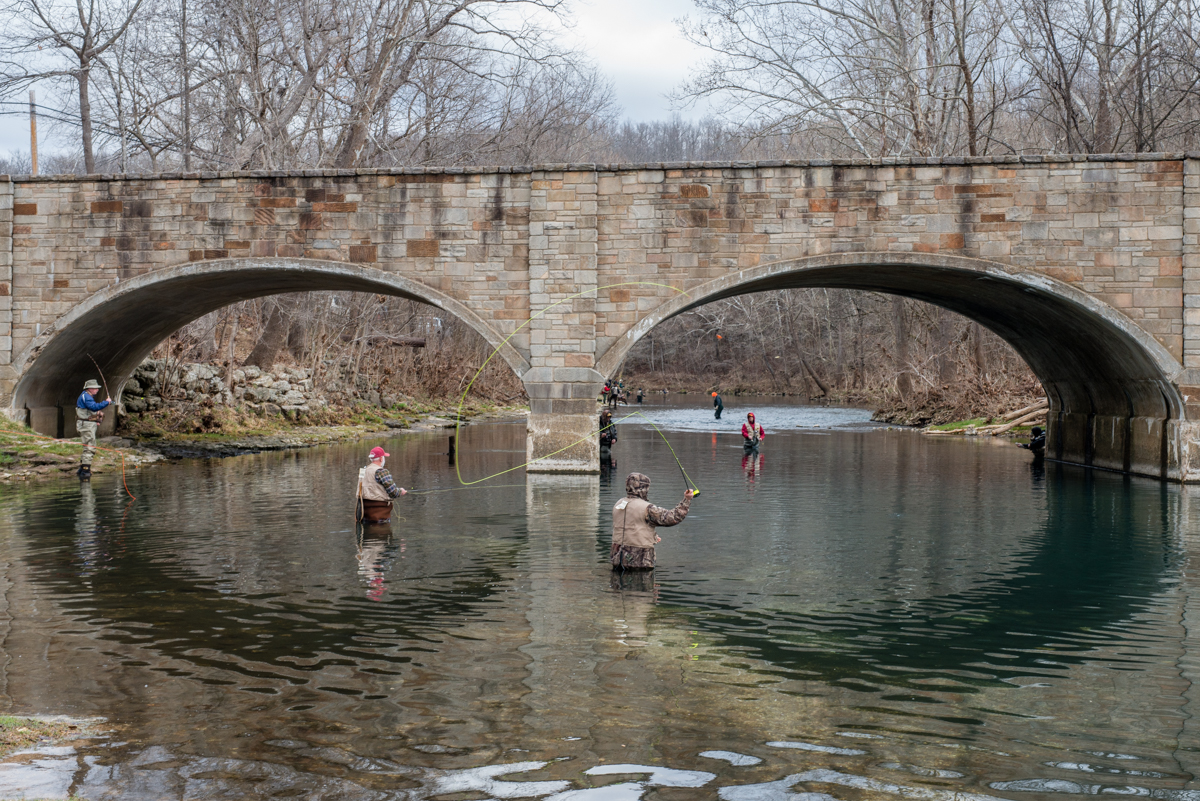
- Trout fishing 2016

- Location within Missouri Location within the United States
- Location: Dallas and Laclede counties, Missouri, United States
- Coordinates: 37°43′32″N 92°51′45″W
- Area: 3,338.55 acres (1,351.06 ha)
- Elevation: 1,076 ft (328 m)
- Established: 1924
- Administrator: Missouri Department of Natural Resources
- Visitors: 1,280,932 (in 2023)
- Website: Official website
- Bennett Spring State Park Shelter House and Water Gauge Station
- U.S. National Register of Historic Places
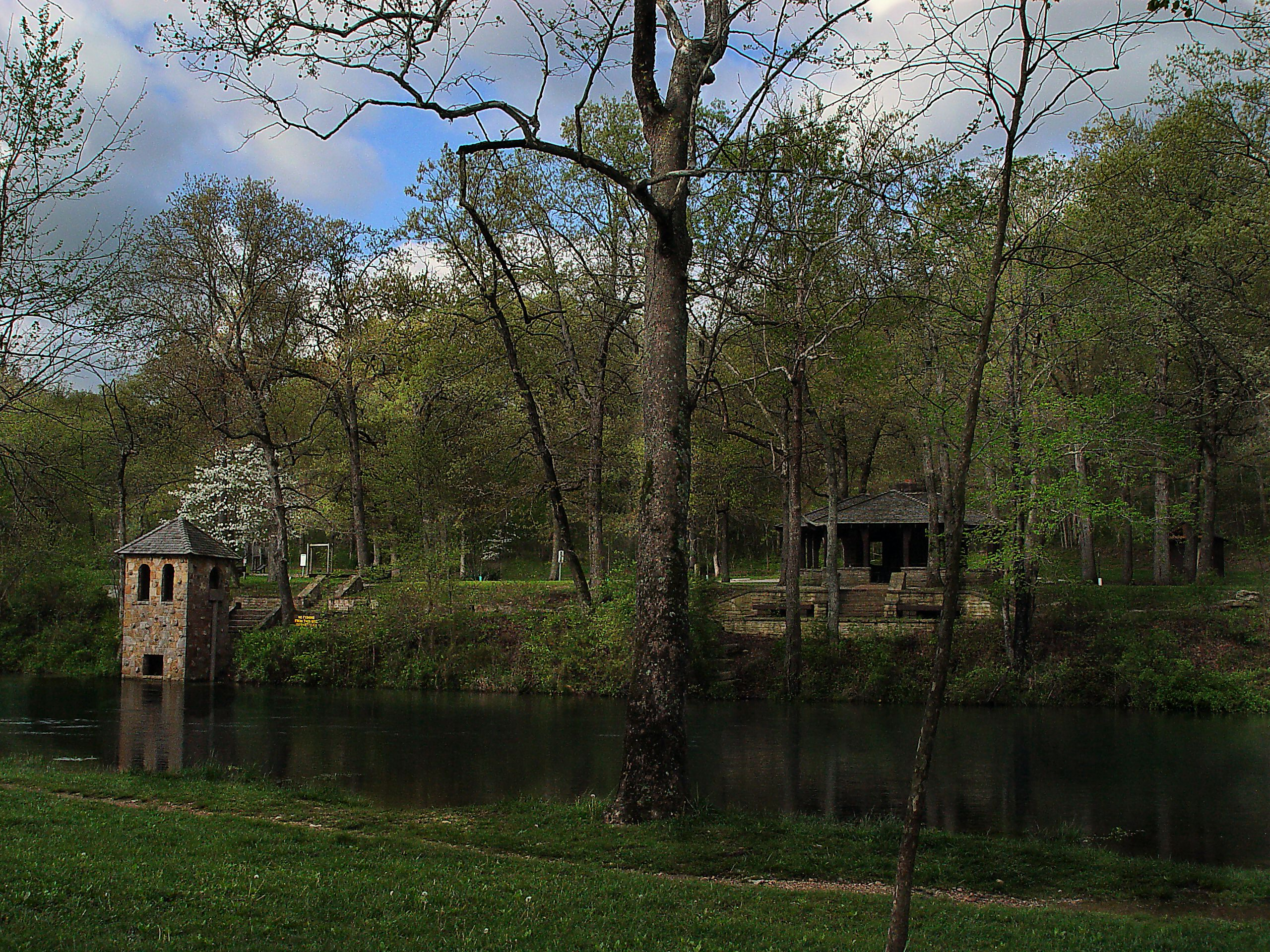
- Historic water gauge station and shelter house
- Location: Dallas and Laclede counties, Missouri, US, near Bennett Springs, Missouri
- Area: Less than one acre
- Built: 1933
- Built by: CCC; NPS
- MPS: ECW Architecture in Missouri State Parks 1933-1942 TR
- NRHP reference No.: 85000527
- Added to NRHP: February 28, 1985
- Bennett Spring State Park Hatchery-Lodge Area Historic District
- U.S. National Register of Historic Places
- U.S. Historic district
- Location: MO A64, Bennett Spring, Missouri
- Area: 20 acres (8.1 ha)
- Built: 1933
- Architect: CCC
- MPS: ECW Architecture in Missouri State Parks 1933-1942 TR
- NRHP reference No.: 85000504
- Added to NRHP: March 4, 1985

Bennett Spring State Park is a public recreation area located in Bennett Springs, Missouri, twelve miles (19 km) west of Lebanon on Highway 64 in Dallas and Laclede counties. It is centered on the spring that flows into the Niangua River and gives the park its name. The spring averages 100 million gallons (380,000 m^{3}) of daily flow. The park offers fly fishing, camping, canoeing, hiking, and other activities.

== History ==
In 1837, the James Brice family built a mill at the stream and the spring became known as Brice Spring. The town they built was known as Brice. The family of Peter Bennett soon settled near the spring and started their own mill. Originally, the families were rivals, but they soon intermarried. Both of these mills were eventually destroyed in a flood.

During the Civil War years, another mill was constructed by Peter Bennett. This Bennett Mill was larger and more successful than the Brice Mill. The spring soon took on the Bennett name. Peter died in 1882 and his son William Sherman Bennett took over. The Bennett Mill burned in 1895.

The state purchased the spring and some surrounding areas in 1924–1925 to create a state park. In the 1930s, the Civilian Conservation Corps (CCC) made various improvements to the park. The CCC built the dining lodge, cabins, trails, roads, shelters, gauge station, and the arched stone bridge across the spring branch. The bridge has three distinctive sideways "C’'" to memorialize the men of the CCC who built it. The CCC also channelized the spring branch and constructed the dam just upstream of the stone bridge to make the spring more habitable to the non-native trout. The dam is used to divert water through the fish hatchery and to maintain a constant water level at Bennett Spring to this day.

== Historic sites ==
The park includes two resources that were listed on the National Register of Historic Places in 1985:

- Bennett Spring State Park Shelter House and Water Gauge Station: The picnic shelter is of wood and random ashlar stone construction with an enclosed alcove that houses a stone fireplace. The water gauge station is a small (8 feet by 8 feet) two-story tower of random cut stone construction with a pyramidal roof and round-arched window openings. It measures 26 feet by 26 feet and has a pitched cross-gabled roof.
- Bennett Spring State Park Hatchery-Lodge Area Historic District: The district encompasses six contributing buildings and two contributing structures erected by the Civilian Conservation Corps between 1933 and 1938. They include two concrete and stone arch bridges, barn, storage building, custodian's residence, Old Officers Quarters ("Hotel"), restroom, and dining lodge.

== Activities and amenities ==
The park offers trout fishing for rainbow and brown trout in the natural spring that is the namesake of the park. The fishing area is divided into three zones, each with its own set of regulations. During the regular season, fish may be caught and kept. Catch and release regulations are in effect during the winter months. Daily fishing begins and ends with a whistle or siren. The opening march of the angler can sometimes resemble a Civil War–style battle line as the anglers progress into the water with a rod in hand.

The park also offers 12 miles (19 km) of hiking trails, canoeing on the Niangua River, camping, cabins, nature center, dining lodge, and park store.
