= Wheatland R-II School District =

School district in Missouri, U.S.

Location
- 291 S Highway 83 P.O. Box 68, Wheatland, MO 65779 United States

District information
- Superintendent: Mr. Doughtery
- NCES District ID: 2931920

Students and staff
- Students: 307(As of 2017)
- Teachers: 24 (As of 2016)
- Staff: 54 (As of 2012)

Other information
- Website: Home Page

Wheatland R-II School District (WSD) is a school district in Hickory County, Missouri with a jurisdiction over Wheatland, Missouri and the surrounding area. WSD has a graduation rate of 100%; 71% are eligible for free or reduced price lunches; and 56% of students head to college after graduation. The average teacher salary is $36,119. The school district spends $10,653 per student, slightly less than the national average

== Schools ==
=== Elementary ===
- Wheatland Elementary (PreK-6)

=== High school ===
- Wheatland High School (6–12)

== Demographics ==
White	African American	Asian American	Latino	Two or More Races
96.5%	0%	0.23%	1.84%	0.23%
