= Jordan, Missouri =

Unincorporated community in Missouri, U.S.

Coordinates: 38°01′17″N 93°08′29″W

Jordan is an unincorporated community in Hickory County, in the U.S. state of Missouri.

== History ==
Jordan was founded in 1904, and named after the proprietor of a local gristmill. A post office called Jordan was established in 1906, and remained in operation until 1955.
