= Bennett Springs, Missouri =

Bennett Spring, Missouri
- Census-designated place
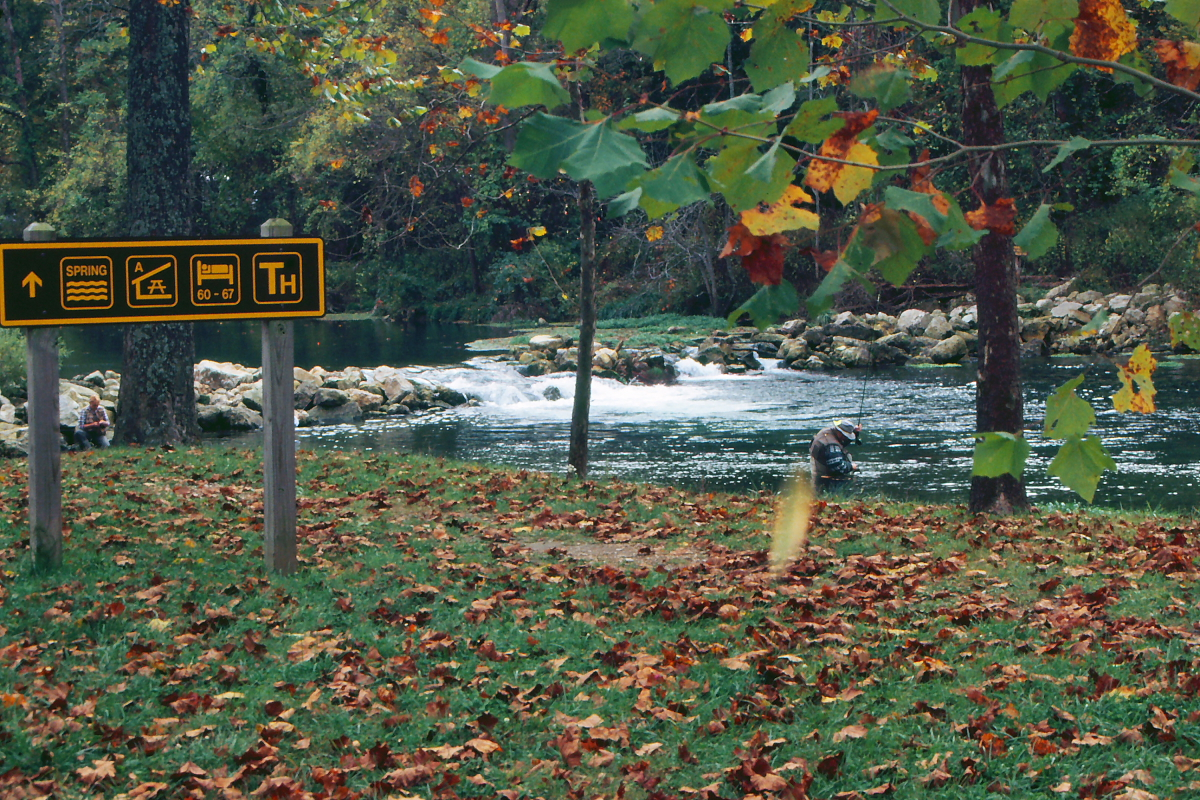
- Bennett Spring State Park

- Location within Missouri Location within the United States
- Coordinates: 37°43′32″N 92°51′12″W
- Country: United States
- State: Missouri
- Counties: Dallas, Laclede

Area
  - Total: 4.24 sq mi (10.97 km^{2})
  - Land: 4.17 sq mi (10.80 km^{2})
  - Water: 0.066 sq mi (0.17 km^{2})
- Elevation: 896 ft (273 m)

Population (2020)
  - Total: 138
  - Density: 33.1/sq mi (12.78/km^{2})
- Time zone: UTC-6 (Central (CST))
  - Summer (DST): UTC-5 (CDT)
- ZIP code: 65536
- Area code: 417
- FIPS code: 29-04525
- GNIS feature ID: 2587052

Bennett Spring is an unincorporated community and census-designated place (CDP) in Dallas and Laclede counties, Missouri, United States. As of the 2020 census, Bennett Spring had a population of 138. It lies 12 miles (19 km) west of Lebanon on Missouri Route 64. The community is named after a spring that is reported variously as the third or fourth largest in the state, with an average daily flow of about one hundred million gallons, and which is the centerpiece of Bennett Spring State Park.

The community is located adjacent to the confluence of Bennett Spring Branch with the Niangua River, a north-flowing tributary of Lake of the Ozarks and part of the Osage River watershed, which flows northeast to the Missouri River. The spring itself is located approximately one mile south along Bennett Spring Branch within the park boundaries.

Bennett Spring State Park is one of the Missouri trout parks. The park features the largest spring of the four parks. Trout fishing, camping, and hiking are the main activities in the park, and the park also offers cabins, a swimming pool, nature center, and a full-service store.

An early variant name was "Brice", after James Brice, the proprietor of a local watermill. A post office called Brice was established in 1900, the name was changed to Bennett Springs in 1939, and the post office closed in 1966.

== Demographics ==
Historical population
| Census | Pop. | Note | %± |
|---|---|---|---|
| 2010 | 130 | | — |
| 2020 | 138 | | 6.2% |
U.S. Decennial Census
