= Goodwin Hollow Creek =

Stream in the American state of Missouri

Goodwin Hollow Creek is a stream in Laclede County in the Ozarks of south central Missouri.

The headwaters of the stream arise northwest of Lebanon at 37°35′45″N 92°42′43″W and the confluence with the Dry Auglaize Creek is at 37°51′21″N 92°39′46″W.

Goodwin Hollow Creek has the name of Peter Goodwin, a pioneer citizen.

== See also ==
- List of rivers of Missouri
