= Pomme de Terre Lake =

Reservoir in Missouri, U.S.

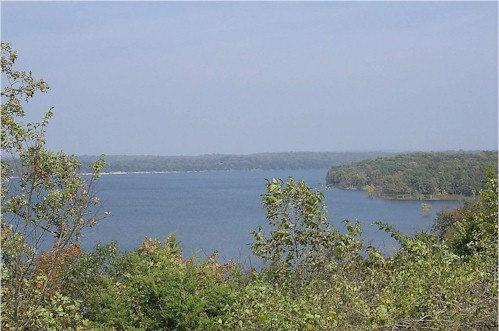

- Location within Missouri
- Location: Hickory / Polk counties, Missouri, United States
- Coordinates: 37°54′06″N 93°19′13″W
- Type: Flood control reservoir
- Basin countries: United States
- Surface area: 7,820 acres (32 km^{2}) multipurpose pool 16,100 acres (65 km^{2}) flood pool
- Shore length^{1}: 113 mi (182 km)
- Surface elevation: 839 ft (256 m)
- ^{1} Shore length is not a well-defined measure.

Pomme de Terre Lake (pronounced /ˌpʌm də ˈtɑːr/ PUM də TAR) is a reservoir in Hickory and Polk counties in Missouri, United States, at the confluence of Lindley Creek and the Pomme de Terre River (for which it is named).

== Description ==
The reservoir is located about 50 miles (80 km) north of Springfield. Its name is the French language word for potato (literally "earth-apple").

The reservoir is part of a series of lakes in the Osage River Basin designed and constructed by the United States Army Corps of Engineers for flood control. Construction began in 1957 and was complete in 1961 at a cost of $14,946,784. Storage of water began on October 29, 1961 and the multipurpose pool was reached on June 15, 1963.

The dam is adjacent to Pomme de Terre State Park and is crossed by Route 254. It consists of a 14-foot (4 m) circular tunnel with two 6.5 X 14-foot (4 m) hydraulic slide service gates and a single 24-inch (610 mm) circular low flow gate. The dam is 7,230 feet (2,204 m) long, 30 feet (9 m) wide at the top and 950 feet (290 m) wide at the base (maximum).

There are two arms of the lake that extend from the dam site. The Pomme de Terre arm follows the Pomme de Terre River and extends for 17 miles (27 km). The Lindley arm follows Lindley Creek for 12 miles (19 km).

== Recreation ==
There are over 650 campsites along the lake as well as two public swimming beaches. Water skiing and many other forms of water recreation are common at the lake. Every 4th of July the local Chamber of Commerce sponsors a fireworks display launched from an island near the dam site.

Pomme de Terre Lake is well known locally for its largemouth bass, crappie and white bass fishing. It has wider acceptance as a premier Muskie lake. Muskellunge have been stocked in the lake since 1966, and the lake boasts one of the best catch ratios in the country.

== State Park ==
There are two sections of state park land near Pomme de Terre which total almost 700 acres (2.8 km^{2}). The Pittsburg section is located on the south shore, and the Hermitage section is located on the east shore. Each area has 128 campsites, a public beach, picnic sites, and hiking trails. The Indian point hiking trail in the Pittsburg area ends at a rock platform overlooking the lake.

== Fishing ==
Pomme De Terre is popular among anglers and the lake is well known for several different species of fish. The fish that the lake is most popular for, however, is the muskie. Muskies don't reproduce naturally in Pomme de Terre, so the Conservation Department nets fish each spring and milks them for eggs. After the eggs are fertilized at the lake, the fish are released. The eggs are then taken to the Lost Valley Fish Hatchery near Warsaw to be hatched. By October, when they are released into Pomme de Terre and several other lakes in Missouri.

== Statistics ==
- Surface area: 7,821 acres (multipurpose pool) / 16,100 acres (flood pool)
- Shoreline: 113 miles (182 km)
- Elevation: 839 feet (256 m) above sea level (multipurpose pool) / 874 feet (flood pool)
- Dam: 7,240 feet (2,207 m) long earth and rockfill embankment; 155 feet (47 m) above streambed

== See also ==
- List of dams and reservoirs in Missouri
