= Joe Knight Building =

- U.S. National Register of Historic Places
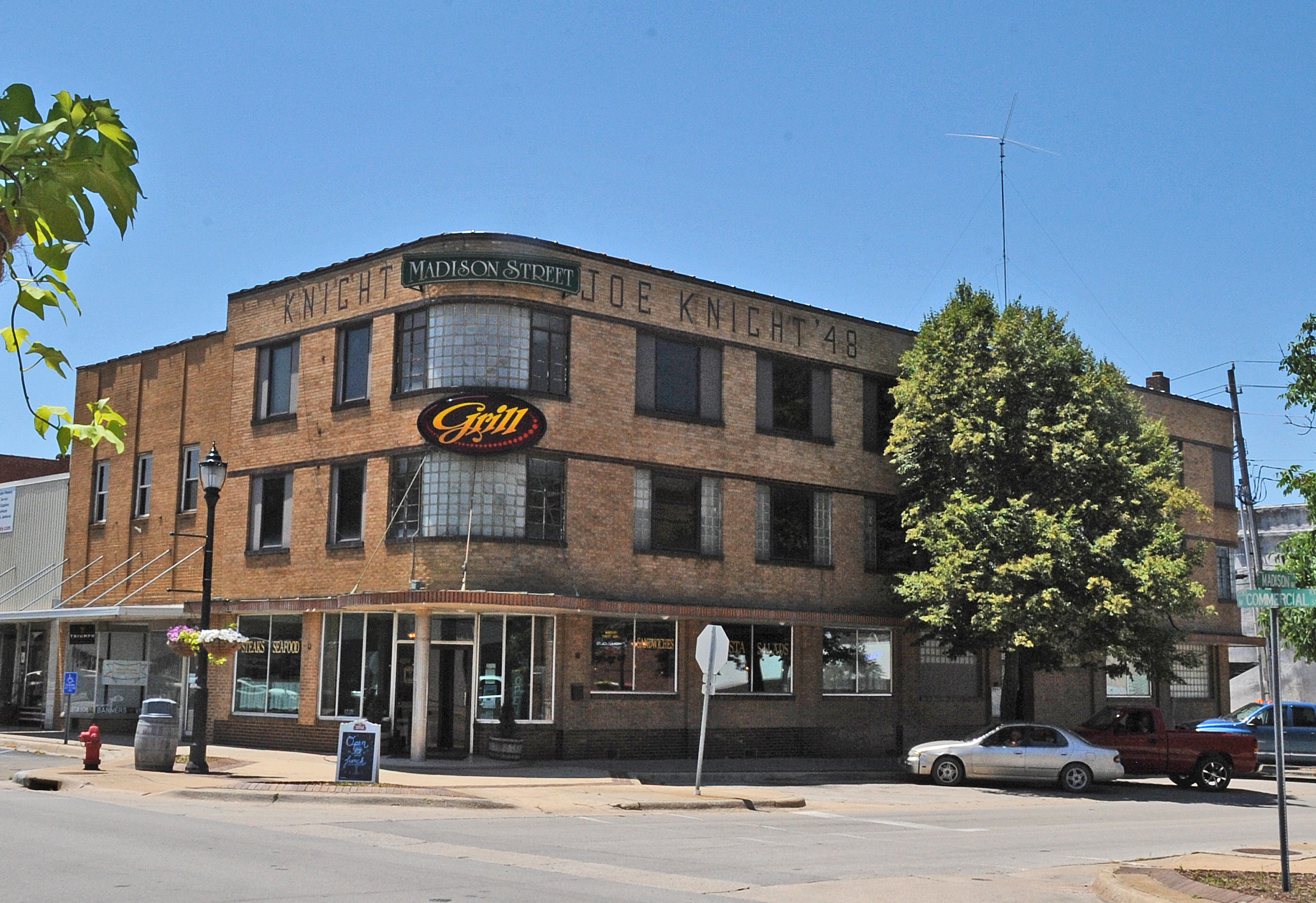
- Joe Knight Building, January 2009

- Location within Missouri Location within the United States
- Location: 201 W. Commercial St., Lebanon, Missouri
- Coordinates: 37°40′54″N 92°39′54″W
- Area: less than one acre
- Built: 1948
- Architectural style: Moderne
- NRHP reference No.: 05000995
- Added to NRHP: September 6, 2005

Joe Knight Building, also known as Joe's Corner and Knight Drug Store, is a historic commercial building located at Lebanon, Laclede County, Missouri. It was built in 1948, and is a three-story, Streamline Moderne brick building with a flat roof. It features horizontal bands of windows and the curved corners are accented by large curved glass block walls. Dark bricks are also used to spell out "Joe Knight '48" and "Knight" on the main elevations.

It was listed on the National Register of Historic Places in 2005.
