= Ploger-Moneymaker Place =

Historic house in Missouri, United States

- U.S. National Register of Historic Places
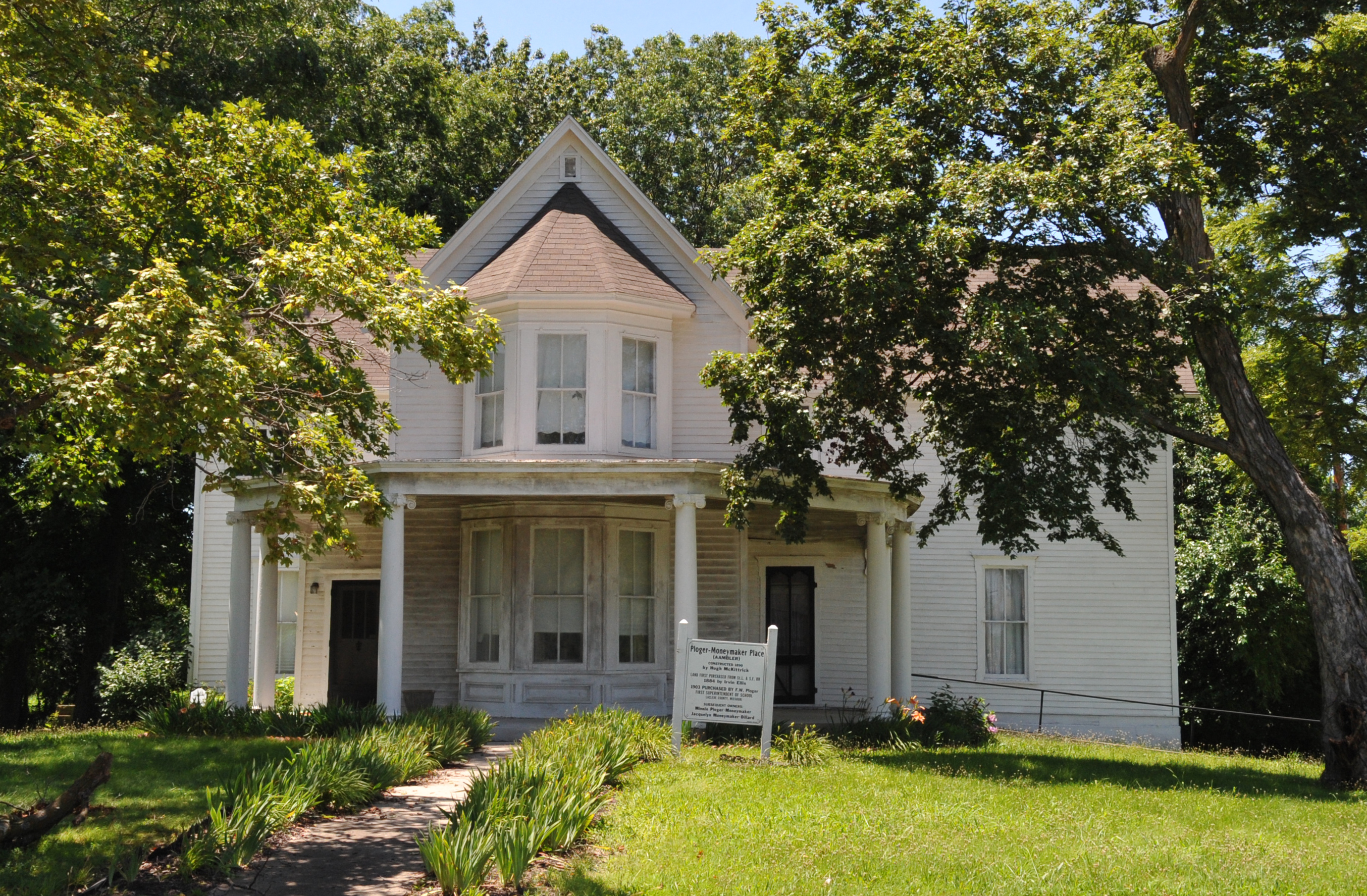
- Ploger-Moneymaker Place, January 2009

- Location within Missouri Location within the United States
- Location: 291 Harwood Ave., Lebanon, Missouri
- Coordinates: 37°41′8″N 92°39′47″W
- Area: 1.1 acres (0.45 ha)
- Built: 1870
- NRHP reference No.: 82003150
- Added to NRHP: September 23, 1982

Ploger-Moneymaker Place, also known as Aambler, is a historic home located at Lebanon, Laclede County, Missouri. It was built about 1870, and is a two-story, T-shaped frame dwelling. It features a wraparound front porch supported by round columns and a two-story bay with decorative moulding.

It was listed on the National Register of Historic Places in 1982.
