= Ralph E. Burley House =

Historic house in Missouri, United States

- U.S. National Register of Historic Places
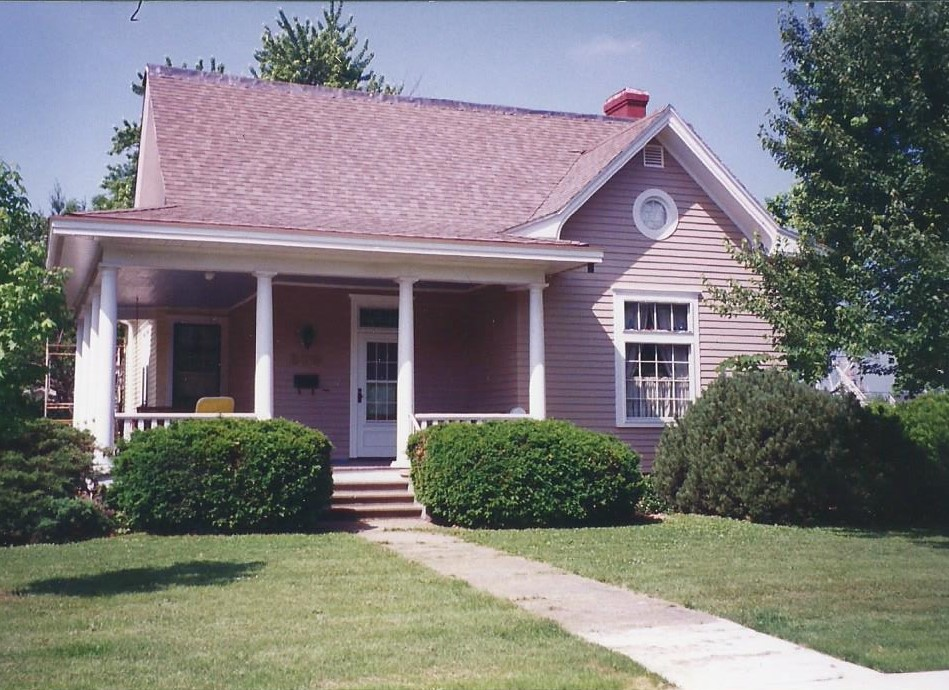
- Ralph E. Burley House, January 2009

- Location within Missouri Location within the United States
- Location: 389 S. Adams Ave., Lebanon, Missouri
- Coordinates: 37°40′44″N 92°39′36″W
- Area: less than one acre
- Built: 1904
- Architect: Hohenschild, Henry H.
- Architectural style: Colonial Revival
- NRHP reference No.: 94000704
- Added to NRHP: July 7, 1994

Ralph E. Burley House is a historic home located at Lebanon, Laclede County, Missouri. It was designed by architect Henry H. Hohenschild and built in 1904. It is a 1 1/2-story, Colonial Revival style frame dwelling. It has an irregular floorplan and features a wraparound front porch supported by round wooden columns.

It was listed on the National Register of Historic Places in 1994.
