= Sally Rand =

American burlesque performer and actress (1904–1979)

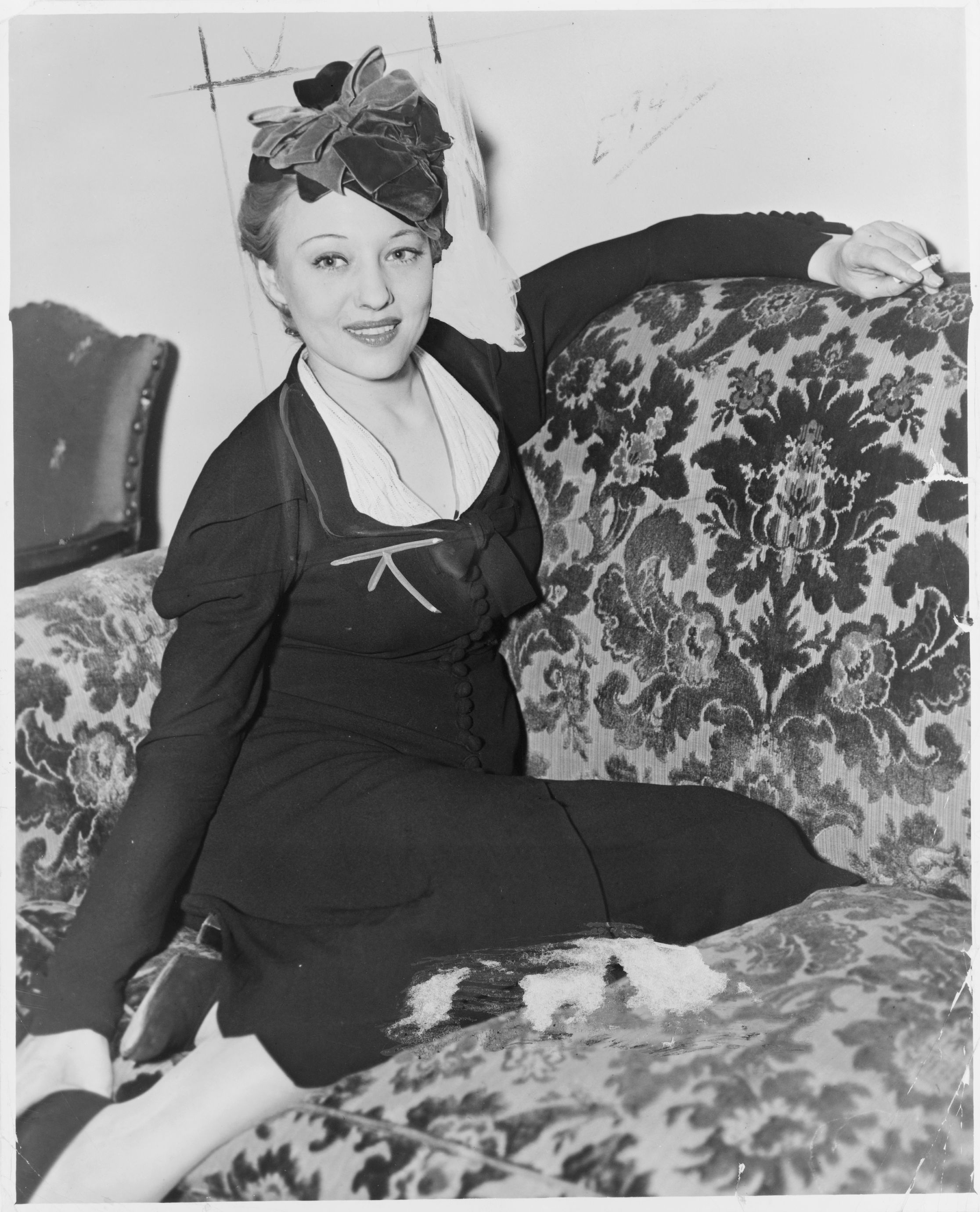
- Rand in 1937
- Born: Helen Gould Beck; April 3, 1904; Elkton, Missouri, U.S.
- Died: August 31, 1979 (aged 75); Glendora, California, U.S.
- Other names: Billie Beck, Helen Gould Beck, Hattie Helen Gould Beck
- Occupations: Burlesque dancer Stripper; Vedette; Actress
- Years active: 1917–1979
- Spouse(s): Thurkel Greenough (1941–1945); Harry Finkelstein (1949–1950); Fred Lalla (1954–1960)
- Children: 1

Sally Rand (born Helen Gould Beck; April 3, 1904 – August 31, 1979) was an American burlesque dancer, stripper, vedette, and actress, famous for her ostrich-feather fan dance and balloon bubble dance. She also performed under the name Billie Beck.

Rand got her start as a chorus girl before working as an acrobat and traveling theater performer. Her career spanned more than forty years, appearing on stage, screen and on television. Through her career she worked alongside Humphrey Bogart, Karl Malden, and Cecil B. De Mille. She was a trained pilot and briefly dated Charles Lindbergh.

== Early life ==
Rand was born in the village of Elkton, Hickory County, Missouri. Her father, William Beck, was a West Point graduate and retired U.S. Army colonel, while her mother, Nettie (Grove) Beck, was a school teacher and part-time newspaper correspondent. The family moved to Jackson County, Missouri while she was still in grade school.

== Career ==
Helen started on the stage quite early, working as a chorus girl at Kansas City's Empress Theater when she was only 13. An early supporter of her talent was Goodman Ace, a drama critic for the Kansas City Journal, who saw her performing in a Kansas City nightclub and wrote glowing reviews. After studying ballet and drama in Kansas City, the teenaged Helen decided her future lay in Hollywood. For a short time, as she worked her way to the west coast, she was employed as an acrobat in the Ringling Brothers Circus. She also performed in summer stock and traveling theater, including working with a then-unknown Humphrey Bogart.

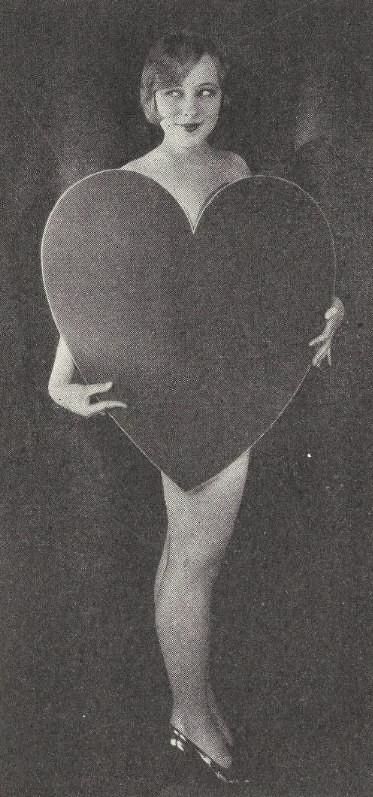
Featured in Cinelandia (March 1927)

During the 1920s, she acted on stage and appeared in silent films. Cecil B. DeMille gave her the name Sally Rand, inspired by a Rand McNally atlas. She was selected as one of the WAMPAS Baby Stars in 1927.

After the introduction of sound films, she became a dancer, known for the fan dance, which she popularized starting at the Paramount Club, at 15 E. Huron, in Chicago. Her most famous appearance was at the 1933 Chicago World's Fair, known as the Century of Progress, accompanied by her backing orchestra, directed by Art Frasik. She would play peek-a-boo with her body by manipulating her fans in the front and behind her, like a winged bird as she swooped and twirled on the stage, usually to "Clair de Lune". She was arrested four times in a single day during the fair due to perceived indecent exposure after a fan dance performance and while riding a white horse down the streets of Chicago, where the nudity was only an illusion, and again after being bodypainted by Max Factor Sr. with his new makeup formulated for Hollywood films. She was convicted of willfully performing an obscene and indecent dance in a public place on September 23, 1933 but was allowed to continue performing at World's Fair, and the conviction was overturned in November 1934.

She also conceived the bubble dance, in part to cope with wind while performing outdoors. She performed the fan dance on film in Bolero, released in 1934. She performed the bubble dance in the film Sunset Murder Case (1938).

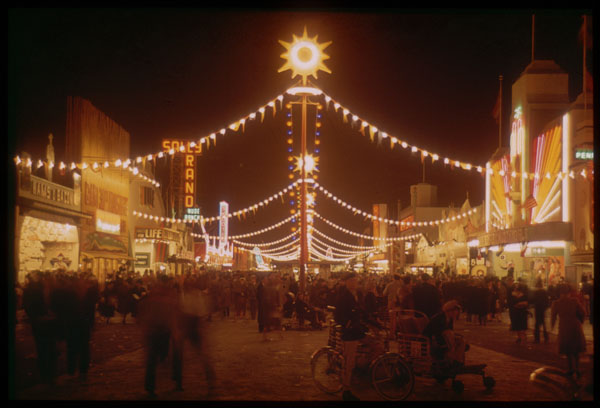
Gayway at night, Golden Gate International Exposition; neon sign advertising Sally Rand's Nude Ranch lit, on left

In 1936, she purchased The Music Box burlesque hall in San Francisco, which later became the Great American Music Hall. She starred in "Sally Rand's Nude Ranch" at the Golden Gate International Exposition in San Francisco in 1939 and 1940. To advertise for her upcoming Treasure Island Nude Ranch, she organized a stunt on February 17, 1939, wherein lingerie clad women on horses rode down Market Street in downtown San Francisco.

Rand took an interest in flying due in part to her brief relationship with Charles Lindbergh. By 1923, Rand had learned to fly, and she would later receive her pilot's license. Rand often flew herself to her performances. On August 1, 1939, she reportedly broke the speed record for a light plane flight she made from San Francisco to Reno, completing the trip in 1 hour and 54 minutes.

In the early 1940s, Rand did summer stock in Woodstock, New York. She signed on to star in Rain and Little Foxes whose cast also included Karl Malden. He remembered being stressed that she was unprepared and seemed to care more about her costumes than learning her lines, costumes which he admitted were dazzling to the point that he forgot his own lines during a performance. “Her burlesque days were written all over her, especially in her hygiene habits,” wrote Malden in his memoirs. “One could assume she rarely bathed, and the college kids who cleaned the rooms at the playhouse confirmed that the tub was never used. Instead, she just kept dousing herself with perfume and shoveling on the makeup, layer upon layer, until it began to cake and separate so that you could see the dirt buildup in the creases around her neck.”

She was arrested twice in San Francisco in 1946; while performing at Club Savoy, she was arrested by six police officers in the audience as she danced, seemingly nude, in silhouette behind a large white fan; the judge, Daniel R. Shoemaker, granted her immunity should she be arrested for the same offense while on trial; however she was arrested during a night of the trial while performing her act, despite her immunity and the fact that she was wearing long underwear and a note that read "CENSORED. S.F.P.D." that time. In an unusual move, the judge viewed her performance at the Savoy and cleared her of all charges after deeming that "anyone who could find something lewd about the dance as she puts it on has to have a perverted idea of morals".

In the early 1950s, she was traveling with a 17-member troupe around the Midwest, appearing at state fairs and small theaters. Edith Dahl accompanied Rand's famous fan dance, the finale of the show, on the violin and "cracked a few jokes". According to local newspaper accounts, Rand's large white feathered fans acted as "a guard to keep too much of mother nature from showing." "Smutty jokes" were at minimum in the afternoon performances." The tour was across Oklahoma and Texas, then west toward Washington before returning east. She refused to divulge her age to reporters at the time, but was known to be approaching 50.

Rand was the mystery guest on the December 28, 1952, episode of What's My Line? Her identity was guessed by panelist Robert Q. Lewis.

She appeared on television on March 12, 1957, in episode 13 of the first season of To Tell the Truth with host Bud Collyer and panelists Polly Bergen, Ralph Bellamy, Kitty Carlisle, and Carl Reiner. She did not "stump the panel", but was correctly identified by all four panelists (she was introduced as Helen Beck, her birth name).

She continued to appear on stage doing her fan dance into the 1970s. While performing at Mangam's Chateau in suburban Chicago in 1966, she donated two of her feather fans to the Chicago History Museum. Rand once replaced Ann Corio in the stage show This Was Burlesque, appeared at the Mitchell Brothers club in San Francisco in the early 1970s and toured as one of the stars of the 1972 nostalgia revue Big Show of 1928, which played major concert venues, including New York's Madison Square Garden. Describing her 40-year career, Rand said, "I haven’t been out of work since the day I took my pants off."

== Death ==
Rand died on August 31, 1979, at Foothill Presbyterian Hospital, in Glendora, California, aged 75, from congestive heart failure. She was deeply in debt at her death. Rand's adopted son told an interviewer that Sammy Davis Jr. stepped in and wrote a $10,000 check, which took care of Rand's expenses.

== Football play ==
Football coaches at the University of Delaware named a football play after Sally Rand. One explanation is that the play misdirected the defense, or in other words, like the dancer herself, the offense was showing more than they actually had. The name migrated to Canada, where a "naked bootleg" became known as a "Sally Rand" and was used to great effect by the BC Lions.

== In popular culture ==
- In Tex Avery's cartoon Hollywood Steps Out (1941), a rotoscoped Rand performs her famous bubble dance onstage to an appreciative crowd. A grinning Peter Lorre caricature in the front row comments, "I haven't seen such a beautiful bubble since I was a child." The routine continues until the bubble is suddenly popped by Harpo Marx and his slingshot, with a surprised Rand (her nudity covered by a well-placed wooden barrel) reacting with shock. Rand is referred to as "Sally Strand" here. Closer to the beginning of the cartoon, a coat check girl says "Good evening, Miss Rand," as we see a woman's hand offer her a set of feather fans to hang up.
- She was the model of several characters in Robert A. Heinlein's science fiction stories, such as the Mary-Lou Martin character of "Let There Be Light". She was also a guest of Robert and Virginia Heinlein at 1976's 34th World Science Fiction Convention, held in Kansas City, Missouri, where Robert Heinlein was the Guest of Honor; at that Worldcon, she served as a judge for the convention's masquerade costume contest. She was also included in Heinlein's 1987 book, To Sail Beyond the Sunset, as a friend of main character, Maureen Johnson Long, mother of the character Lazarus Long.
- In the 1979 book The Right Stuff, the author Tom Wolfe described Sally Rand fan-dancing for the first American astronauts and other dignitaries at the barbecue in Houston celebrating the space center, and referred to the astronauts' observing this sixtyish woman's "ancient haunches". In the 1983 film version of The Right Stuff, Rand was portrayed by actress Peggy Davis.
- A fictionalized version of Rand appeared in Toni Dove's interactive cinema project Spectropia, played by Helen Pickett of the Wooster Group.
- In the 1936 Merrie Melodie cartoon Page Miss Glory, a robustly proportioned matron performs a parody of Rand's fan dance.
- In the "Nathan Heller" mystery series by Max Allan Collins, Detective Heller meets Rand.
- In her novel The Fountainhead, Ayn Rand (no relation) mentions a Sally Rand-inspired performer named Juanita Fay "who danced with a live peacock as sole garment" at The March of the Centuries 1936 world fair (which strongly resembles 1933 Century of Progress fair).

== Partial filmography ==
- The Dressmaker from Paris (1925) - Mannequin (uncredited)
- Fifth Avenue Models (1925) - Mannequin / Dancer (uncredited)
- The Texas Bearcat (1925) - Jean Crawford
- The Road to Yesterday (1925) - Party Guest (uncredited)
- Braveheart (1925) - Sally Vernon
- Bachelor Brides (1926) - Maid
- Sunny Side Up (1926) - A Dancer
- Gigolo (1926) - Tourist Girl in Paris
- Man Bait (1926) - Nancy
- The Night of Love (1927) - Gypsy Dancer
- Getting Gertie's Garter (1927) - Teddy Desmond
- The Yankee Clipper (1927) - Wing Toy (uncredited)
- The King of Kings (1927) - Mary Magdalene's Slave (uncredited)
- His Dog (1927) - Marian Gault
- The Fighting Eagle (1927) - Fräulein Hertz
- Galloping Fury (1927) - Dorothy Shelton
- Heroes in Blue (1927) - Anne Dugan
- A Woman Against the World (1928) - Maysie Bell
- Crashing Through (1928) - Rita Bayne
- Nameless Men (1928)
- A Girl in Every Port (1928) - Girl in Bombay (uncredited)
- The Czarina's Secret (1928, Short)
- Golf Widows (1928) - Mary Ward
- Black Feather (1928)
- The Sign of the Cross (1932) - Crocodiles' Victim (uncredited)
- Hotel Variety (1933)
- Bolero (1934) - Annette
- The Big Show (1936) - State Fair Performer
- Sunset Murder Case (1938) - Kathy O'Connor

== Sources ==
- Knox, Holly. Sally Rand, From Films to Fans. Maverick Publications (1988); ISBN 0-89288-172-0
- Lowe, Jim. Barefoot to the Chin - The Fantastic Life of Sally Rand (2018); ISBN 978-1-889574-45-5
- Hazelgrove, William Elliott. Sally Rand: American Sex Symbol (2020)
