= Wallace House (Lebanon, Missouri) =

Historic house in Missouri, United States

- U.S. National Register of Historic Places
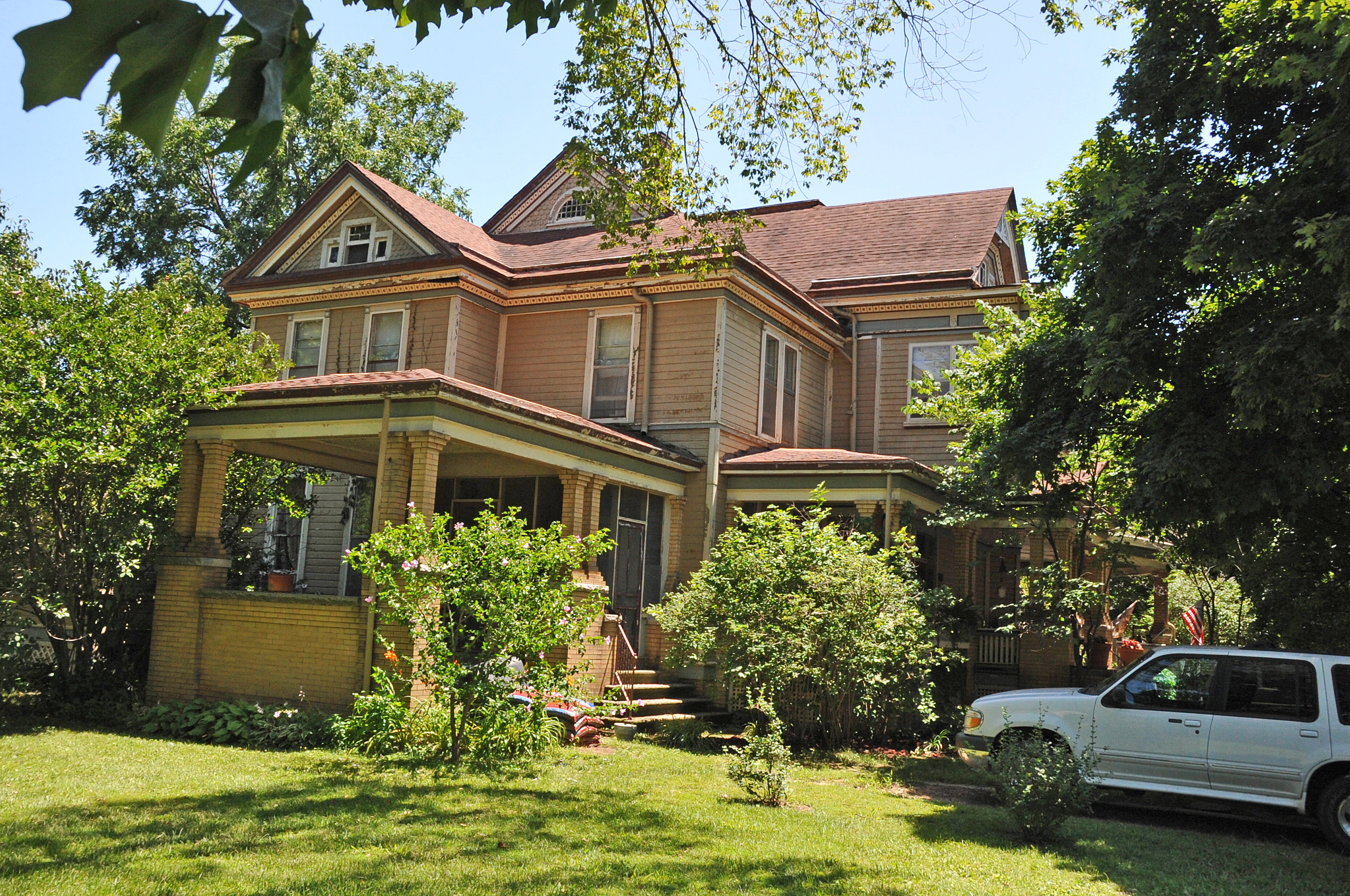
- Wallace House, January 2009

- Location within Missouri Location within the United States
- Location: 230 Harwood Ave., Lebanon, Missouri
- Coordinates: 37°41′5″N 92°39′46″W
- Area: less than one acre
- Built: 1876-1877
- Architectural style: Stick/eastlake
- NRHP reference No.: 84002579
- Added to NRHP: March 22, 1984

Wallace House is a historic home located at Lebanon, Laclede County, Missouri. It was built in 1876–1877, and is a two-story, Stick style / Eastlake movement frame dwelling. It features decorated gables, a corner bay window, and a porch with squared columns and cut-out brackets. A larger front porch and a porte cochere were added about 1909.

It was listed on the National Register of Historic Places in 1984.
