= Nemo, Missouri =

Unincorporated community in Missouri, U.S.

Coordinates: 37°52′36″N 93°15′43″W

Nemo is an unincorporated community in Hickory County, in the U.S. state of Missouri.

== History ==
A post office called Nemo was established in 1893, and remained in operation until 1913. It is uncertain why the name "Nemo" was applied to this community. It has been researched with the earliest mention that people found (so far) was on a map date 1904.
