= Laclede County Jail =

- Formerly listed on the U.S. National Register of Historic Places
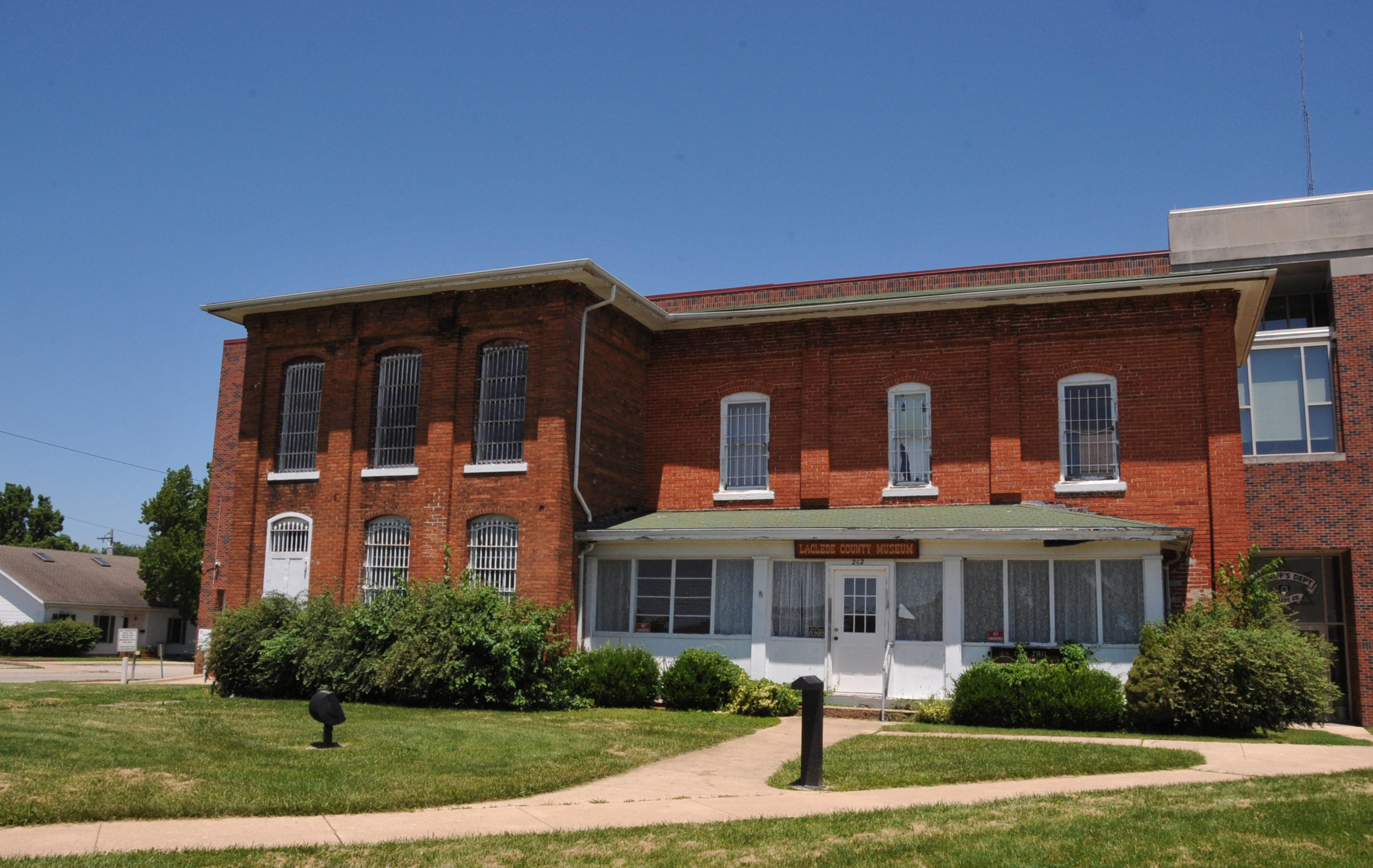
- Laclede County Jail, January 2009

- Location within Missouri Location within the United States
- Location: Adams and 3rd Sts., Lebanon, Missouri
- Coordinates: 37°40′59″N 92°39′52″W
- Area: 0.3 acres (0.12 ha)
- Built: 1876, 1913
- Architect: Ingraham, W.P.; Pauly, P.J.
- NRHP reference No.: 80002372

Significant dates
- Added to NRHP: March 27, 1980
- Removed from NRHP: February 4, 2022

Laclede County Jail, also known as Laclede County Museum, was a historic jail located at Lebanon, Laclede County, Missouri. The original section was built in 1876, with living quarters for the sheriff added in 1913. It was a two-story, T-shaped brick building with a low-pitched hipped roof. It was maintained by the Laclede County Historical Society, which used the facility as a museum. It was demolished for safety reasons in 2021.

It was listed on the National Register of Historic Places in 2005 and was removed in 2022.
