= Weaubleau, Missouri =

City in Hickory County, Missouri, United States

- City
- Location of Weaubleau, Missouri
- Coordinates: 37°53′29″N 93°32′25″W
- Country: United States
- State: Missouri
- County: Hickory

Area
  - Total: 0.87 sq mi (2.26 km^{2})
  - Land: 0.86 sq mi (2.24 km^{2})
  - Water: 0.0077 sq mi (0.02 km^{2})
- Elevation: 988 ft (301 m)

Population (2020)
  - Total: 378
  - Density: 437.0/sq mi (168.73/km^{2})
- Time zone: UTC-6 (Central (CST))
  - Summer (DST): UTC-5 (CDT)
- ZIP code: 65774
- Area code: 417
- FIPS code: 29-78064
- GNIS feature ID: 2397237
- Website: cityofweaubleau.org

Weaubleau (/ˈwɒbloʊ/ WOB-loh) is a city in Hickory County, Missouri, United States, founded in 1867. The population was 378 at the 2020 census.

== History ==
Weaubleau was first called Haran, but later renamed for the stream upon which it is located. The town sprang up around the Weaubleau Christian College and Weaubleau Congregational Christian Church, which predated the town, and surrounding Weaubleau Township.

== Geography ==
According to the United States Census Bureau, the city has a total area of 0.88 square miles (2.28 km^{2}), of which 0.87 square miles (2.25 km^{2}) is land and 0.01 square miles (0.03 km^{2}) is water.

== Demographics ==
Historical population
Census	Pop.	Note	%±
1900	274		—
1910	347		26.6%
1920	413		19.0%
1930	421		1.9%
1940	439		4.3%
1950	432		−1.6%
1960	349		−19.2%
1970	343		−1.7%
1980	464		35.3%
1990	436		−6.0%
2000	518		18.8%
2010	418		−19.3%
2020	378		−9.6%
U.S. Decennial Census

=== 2010 census ===
At the 2010 census, there were 418 people in 190 households, including 111 families, in the city. The population density was 480.5 inhabitants per square mile (185.5/km^{2}). There were 233 housing units at an average density of 267.8 per square mile (103.4/km^{2}). The racial makup of the city was 97.4% White, 0.2% African American, 0.7% Native American, and 1.7% from two or more races.

Of the 190 households, 26.8% had children under the age of 18 living with them, 42.1% were married couples living together, 13.2% had a female householder with no husband present, 3.2% had a male householder with no wife present, and 41.6% were non-families. 36.8% of households were one person, and 19.5% were one person aged 65 or older. The average household size was 2.20 and the average family size was 2.81.

The median age was 46.3 years. 21.1% of residents were under the age of 18; 7.1% were between the ages of 18 and 24; 20.3% were from 25 to 44; 30.2% were from 45 to 64; and 21.3% were 65 or older. The gender makeup of the city was 47.6% male and 52.4% female.

=== 2000 census ===
At the 2000 census, there were 518 people in 220 households, including 133 families, in the city. The population density was 590.8 inhabitants per square mile (228.1/km^{2}). There were 257 housing units at an average density of 293.1 per square mile (113.2/km^{2}). The racial makup of the city was 97.68% White, 0.19% African American, 0.58% Native American, 0.19% from other races, and 1.35% from two or more races. Hispanic or Latino of any race were 1.16%.

Of the 220 households, 29.1% had children under the age of 18 living with them, 47.3% were married couples living together, 9.1% had a female householder with no husband present, and 39.5% were non-families. 33.2% of households were one person, and 19.5% were one person aged 65 or older. The average household size was 2.35 and the average family size was 3.02.

In the city, the population was spread out, with 26.3% under the age of 18, 8.1% from 18 to 24, 23.0% from 25 to 44, 21.2% from 45 to 64, and 21.4% 65 or older. The median age was 39 years. For every 100 females, there were 87.0 males. For every 100 females age 18 and over, there were 86.3 males.

The median household income was $18,750 and the median family income was $21,765. Males had a median income of $19,643 versus $20,139 for females. The per capita income for the city was $9,952. About 17.6% of families and 27.3% of the population were below the poverty line, including 43.2% of those under age 18 and 18.0% of those age 65 or over.

== See also ==
- List of cities in Missouri
- Weaubleau egg
