= Tyler Township, Hickory County, Missouri =

Township in Missouri

Coordinates: 37.8608°N 93.4039°W

Tyler Township is an inactive township in Hickory County, in the U.S. state of Missouri.

Tyler Township was established in 1845, taking its name from President John Tyler.
