= Wheatland High School (Missouri) =

Coordinates: 37.9418°N 93.4023°W

- 291 Highway 83; Wheatland, MO 65779

Information
- Type: Public High School
- School district: Wheatland R-II School District
- NCES School ID: 293192002235
- Teaching staff: 14.21 (FTE)
- Grades: 7–12
- Enrollment: 136 (2023-2024)
- Student to teacher ratio: 9.57
- Campus type: Rural
- Colors: Blue and white
- Athletics conference: MSHAA
- Mascot: Mule
- Website: School Website

Wheatland High School is a public high school located in Wheatland, Missouri.

== About ==
The student-teacher ratio is 11 to 1. Wheatland is recognized in Missouri and earned a bronze medal in academic achievement. The high school's student body is 97% white, with 61% being economically disadvantaged and eligible for free or reduced-price lunches. The graduation rate is 80%.

== Notable alumni ==
- Mike Parson (1973), 57th governor of Missouri
