= Wheatland, Missouri =

- City
- Location of Wheatland, Missouri
- Coordinates: 37°56′27″N 93°23′57″W
- Country: United States
- State: Missouri
- County: Hickory

Area
  - Total: 1.17 sq mi (3.03 km^{2})
  - Land: 1.17 sq mi (3.02 km^{2})
  - Water: 0 sq mi (0.00 km^{2})
- Elevation: 1,089 ft (332 m)

Population (2020)
  - Total: 277
  - Density: 237/sq mi (91.6/km^{2})
- Time zone: UTC-6 (Central (CST))
  - Summer (DST): UTC-5 (CDT)
- ZIP code: 65779
- Area code: 417
- FIPS code: 29-79090
- GNIS feature ID: 2397293
- Website: wheatland.municipalimpact.com

Wheatland is a city in Hickory County, Missouri, United States. The population was 277 at the 2020 census.

== History ==
Wheatland was platted in 1869. The village most likely was named after the retirement home of the fifteenth President of the United States, James Buchanan, who died June 1, 1868, at his home, called Wheatland, in Lancaster, Pennsylvania.

Butterfield Overland Mail Route 1858-1861 Period on a Campbell's 1873 Map by Gregory Wadley. US Department of the Interior Bureau of Land Management Original Surveys 1835 & 1845

== Geography ==
According to the United States Census Bureau, the city has a total area of 0.61 square miles (1.58 km^{2}), all land.

== Demographics ==
Historical population
Census	Pop.	Note	%±
1870	80		—
1880	191		138.8%
1930	237		—
1940	269		13.5%
1950	299		11.2%
1960	305		2.0%
1970	317		3.9%
1980	364		14.8%
1990	363		−0.3%
2000	388		6.9%
2010	371		−4.4%
2020	277		−25.3%
U.S. Decennial Census

=== 2010 census ===
At the 2010 census there were 371 people in 185 households, including 95 families, in the city. The population density was 608.2 inhabitants per square mile (234.8/km^{2}). There were 242 housing units at an average density of 396.7 per square mile (153.2/km^{2}). The racial makup of the city was 94.1% White, 1.6% African American, 0.5% Native American, 1.9% Pacific Islander, 0.3% from other races, and 1.6% from two or more races. Hispanic or Latino of any race were 1.6%.

Of the 185 households 23.2% had children under the age of 18 living with them, 30.8% were married couples living together, 14.1% had a female householder with no husband present, 6.5% had a male householder with no wife present, and 48.6% were non-families. 43.8% of households were one person and 23.8% were one person aged 65 or older. The average household size was 2.01 and the average family size was 2.67.

The median age was 44.4 years. 19.4% of residents were under the age of 18; 8.8% were between the ages of 18 and 24; 22.9% were from 25 to 44; 27.7% were from 45 to 64; and 21.3% were 65 or older. The gender makeup of the city was 46.9% male and 53.1% female.

=== 2000 census ===
At the 2000 census there were 388 people in 192 households, including 105 families, in the city. The population density was 1,093.8 inhabitants per square mile (422.3/km^{2}). There were 226 housing units at an average density of 637.1 per square mile (246.0/km^{2}). The racial makup of the city was 98.97% White, 0.52% Native American, 0.26% Asian, and 0.26% from two or more races. Hispanic or Latino of any race were 0.26%.

Of the 192 households 22.9% had children under the age of 18 living with them, 37.0% were married couples living together, 13.5% had a female householder with no husband present, and 44.8% were non-families. 42.2% of households were one person and 30.7% were one person aged 65 or older. The average household size was 2.02 and the average family size was 2.75.

The age distribution was 22.9% under the age of 18, 7.7% from 18 to 24, 19.1% from 25 to 44, 23.5% from 45 to 64, and 26.8% 65 or older. The median age was 46 years. For every 100 females, there were 79.6 males. For every 100 females age 18 and over, there were 65.2 males.

The median household income was $17,500 and the median family income was $27,596. Males had a median income of $23,393 versus $14,375 for females. The per capita income for the city was $10,025. About 20.0% of families and 28.1% of the population were below the poverty line, including 34.5% of those under age 18 and 29.8% of those age 65 or over.

== Education ==
Wheatland is served by Wheatland R-II School District and Wheatland High School

== Sports ==
Lucas Oil Speedway is a motorsports complex that features a dirt oval, an off-road track and a motorboat racing lake.

== Notable person ==
- Mike Parson, former Governor of Missouri, born in Wheatland
