= Lebanon, Missouri =

City in Missouri, U.S.

- City
- City of Lebanon
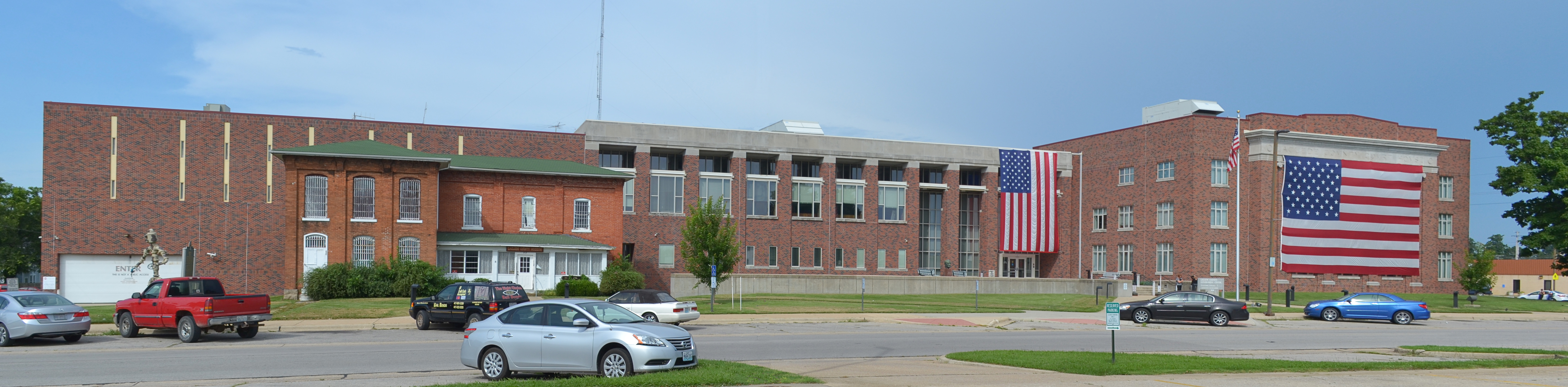
- Downtown Lebanon Post Office Laclede County Library Laclede County Courthouse E.D. Rush Covered Bridge
- Motto: "Friendly People. Friendly Place."
- Interactive map of Lebanon, Missouri
- Coordinates: 37°40′00″N 92°39′00″W
- Country: United States
- State: Missouri
- County: Laclede
- Incorporated: 1877

Government
  - Type: Mayor-Council-City Administrator
  - Mayor: Jared Carr

Area
  - Total: 14.72 sq mi (38.13 km^{2})
  - Land: 14.64 sq mi (37.92 km^{2})
  - Water: 0.081 sq mi (0.21 km^{2})
- Elevation: 1,280 ft (390 m)

Population (2020)
  - Total: 15,013
  - Density: 1,025.3/sq mi (395.86/km^{2})
- Time zone: UTC-6 (Central (CST))
  - Summer (DST): UTC-5 (CDT)
- ZIP code: 65536
- Area code: 417
- FIPS code: 29-41168
- GNIS feature ID: 2395664
- Website: www.lebanonmissouri.org

Lebanon is a city in and the county seat of Laclede County, Missouri, United States. The population was estimated at 15,013 at the time of the 2020 census. The Lebanon Micropolitan Statistical Area consists of Laclede County. The original name of Lebanon was Wyota, named after the original Native Americans that settled in the area. Later, Reverend Benjamin Hooker changed the name to his hometown in Lebanon, Tennessee.

== History ==
Lebanon was founded in 1849. The community was named after Lebanon, Tennessee, the former home of many of the first settlers.

Lebanon had many motels for travelers along Route 66.

The Ralph E. Burley House, Joe Knight Building, Laclede County Jail, Ploger-Moneymaker Place, and Wallace House are listed on the National Register of Historic Places.

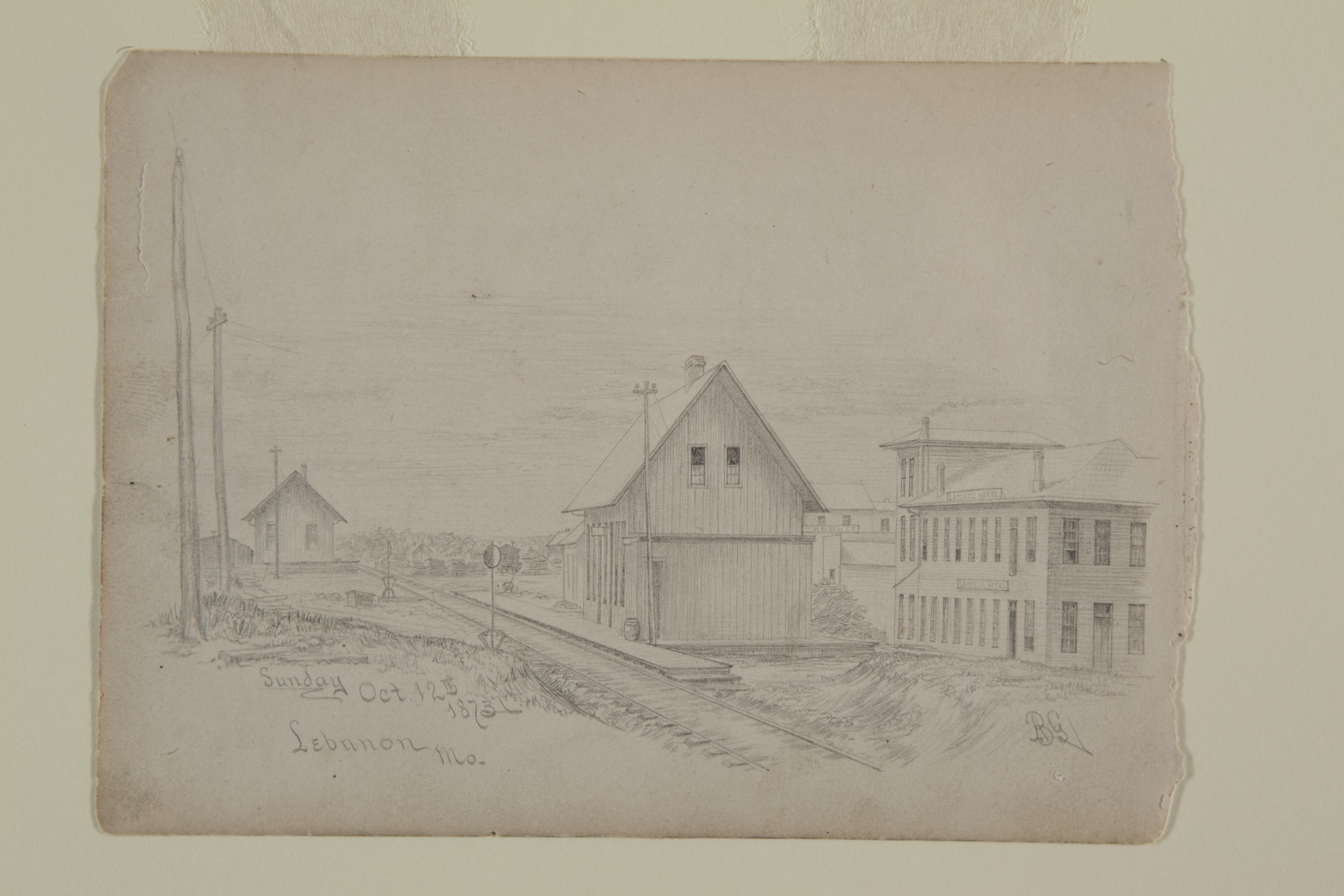
Lebanon Train Depot in 1873

== Demographics ==
Historical population
Census	Pop.	Note	%±
1860	341		—
1870	1,090		219.6%
1880	1,419		30.2%
1890	2,218		56.3%
1900	2,125		−4.2%
1910	2,430		14.4%
1920	2,848		17.2%
1930	3,562		25.1%
1940	5,025		41.1%
1950	6,808		35.5%
1960	8,220		20.7%
1970	8,616		4.8%
1980	9,507		10.3%
1990	9,983		5.0%
2000	12,155		21.8%
2010	14,474		19.1%
2020	15,013		3.7%
U.S. Decennial Census

=== 2020 census ===
As of the 2020 census, Lebanon had a population of 15,013 and 3,784 families. The population density was 1,025.5 per square mile (395.9/km^{2}). The median age was 37.1 years. 25.2% of residents were under the age of 18 and 17.1% of residents were 65 years of age or older. For every 100 females there were 92.8 males, and for every 100 females age 18 and over there were 89.3 males age 18 and over.

96.3% of residents lived in urban areas, while 3.7% lived in rural areas.

There were 6,197 households in Lebanon, of which 31.7% had children under the age of 18 living in them. Of all households, 38.6% were married-couple households, 20.0% were households with a male householder and no spouse or partner present, and 32.6% were households with a female householder and no spouse or partner present. About 33.3% of all households were made up of individuals and 14.2% had someone living alone who was 65 years of age or older.

There were 6,831 housing units, of which 9.3% were vacant. The homeowner vacancy rate was 2.8% and the rental vacancy rate was 7.3%.

Racial composition as of the 2020 census
Race	Number	Percent
White	13,418	89.4%
Black or African American	204	1.4%
American Indian and Alaska Native	87	0.6%
Asian	123	0.8%
Native Hawaiian and Other Pacific Islander	8	0.1%
Some other race	174	1.2%
Two or more races	999	6.7%
Hispanic or Latino (of any race)	525	3.5%

=== Income and poverty ===
The 2016–2020 5-year American Community Survey estimates show that the median household income was $41,160 (with a margin of error of +/- $4,834) and the median family income was $55,330 (+/- $5,167). Males had a median income of $35,720 (+/- $3,968) versus $22,032 (+/- $3,611) for females. The median income for those above 16 years old was $30,181 (+/- $3,901). Approximately, 16.2% of families and 21.0% of the population were below the poverty line, including 22.0% of those under the age of 18 and 18.5% of those ages 65 or over.

=== 2010 census ===
As of the census of 2010, there were 14,474 people, 5,980 households, and 3,745 families living in the city. The population density was 989.3 inhabitants per square mile (382.0/km^{2}). There were 6,728 housing units at an average density of 459.9 units per square mile (177.6 units/km^{2}). The racial makeup of the city was 94.1% White, 1.3% African American, 0.6% Native American, 0.7% Asian, 0.1% Pacific Islander, 0.7% from other races, and 2.4% from two or more races. Hispanic or Latino of any race were 2.6% of the population.

There were 5,980 households, of which 34.0% had children under the age of 18 living with them, 43.6% were married couples living together, 13.7% had a female householder with no husband present, 5.3% had a male householder with no wife present, and 37.4% were non-families. 31.8% of all households were made up of individuals, and 14.3% had someone living alone who was 65 years of age or older. The average household size was 2.36 and the average family size was 2.94.

The median age in the city was 35.4 years. 25.9% of residents were under the age of 18; 9.7% were between the ages of 18 and 24; 25.9% were from 25 to 44; 22.5% were from 45 to 64; and 15.8% were 65 years of age or older. The gender makeup of the city was 47.5% male and 52.5% female.

=== 2000 census ===
As of the census of 2000, there were 12,155 people, 5,132 households, and 3,181 families living in the city. The population density was 891.9 inhabitants per square mile (344.4/km^{2}). There were 5,745 housing units at an average density of 421.6 units per square mile (162.8 units/km^{2}). The racial makeup of the city was 95.99% White, 0.90% African American, 0.54% Native American, 0.50% Asian, 0.03% Pacific Islander, 0.42% from other races, and 1.61% from two or more races. Hispanic or Latino of any race were 1.65% of the population.

There were 5,132 households, out of which 30.6% had children under the age of 18 living with them, 45.8% were married couples living together, 12.3% had a female householder with no husband present, and 38.0% were non-families. 33.4% of all households were made up of individuals, and 16.6% had someone living alone who was 65 years of age or older. The average household size was 2.30 and the average family size was 2.91.

In the city, the population was spread out, with 25.2% under the age of 18, 10.1% from 18 to 24, 27.4% from 25 to 44, 19.5% from 45 to 64, and 17.9% who were 65 years of age or older. The median age was 36 years. For every 100 females, there were 88.2 males. For every 100 females age 18 and over, there were 82.9 males.

The median income for a household in the city was $27,668, and the median income for a family was $36,509. Males had a median income of $27,657 versus $17,509 for females. The per capita income for the city was $16,636. About 12.3% of families and 15.2% of the population were below the poverty line, including 17.4% of those under age 18 and 18.0% of those age 65 or over.

== Geography ==
According to the United States Census Bureau, the city has a total area of 14.72 square miles (38.12 km^{2}), of which 14.63 square miles (37.89 km^{2}) is land and 0.09 square miles (0.23 km^{2}) is water. Lebanon is along I-44, and Routes 5, 32, and 64 as well as the historic Route 66.

=== Climate ===
Climate data for Lebanon 2W, Missouri (1991–2020 normals, extremes 1892–present)
Month	Jan	Feb	Mar	Apr	May	Jun	Jul	Aug	Sep	Oct	Nov	Dec	Year
Record high °F (°C)	79 (26)	83 (28)	90 (32)	93 (34)	101 (38)	105 (41)	113 (45)	110 (43)	106 (41)	95 (35)	86 (30)	80 (27)	113 (45)
Mean maximum °F (°C)	65.7 (18.7)	71.2 (21.8)	78.9 (26.1)	93.7 (34.3)	88.0 (31.1)	91.9 (33.3)	96.8 (36.0)	97.6 (36.4)	91.6 (33.1)	84.6 (29.2)	74.8 (23.8)	66.7 (19.3)	99.0 (37.2)
Mean daily maximum °F (°C)	42.5 (5.8)	47.6 (8.7)	57.7 (14.3)	67.6 (19.8)	75.9 (24.4)	83.9 (28.8)	88.4 (31.3)	87.5 (30.8)	80.0 (26.7)	69.1 (20.6)	56.1 (13.4)	45.8 (7.7)	66.8 (19.3)
Daily mean °F (°C)	32.3 (0.2)	36.5 (2.5)	46.0 (7.8)	55.8 (13.2)	65.0 (18.3)	73.4 (23.0)	77.7 (25.4)	76.4 (24.7)	68.4 (20.2)	57.3 (14.1)	45.3 (7.4)	36.0 (2.2)	55.8 (13.2)
Mean daily minimum °F (°C)	22.2 (−5.4)	25.4 (−3.7)	34.3 (1.3)	43.9 (6.6)	54.2 (12.3)	62.8 (17.1)	67.1 (19.5)	65.2 (18.4)	56.8 (13.8)	44.4 (6.9)	34.6 (1.4)	26.3 (−3.2)	44.9 (7.2)
Mean minimum °F (°C)	2.6 (−16.3)	7.1 (−13.8)	15.7 (−9.1)	28.6 (−1.9)	37.9 (3.3)	49.9 (9.9)	56.4 (13.6)	53.7 (12.1)	41.0 (5.0)	28.1 (−2.2)	17.8 (−7.9)	7.8 (−13.4)	−1.2 (−18.4)
Record low °F (°C)	−21 (−29)	−28 (−33)	−10 (−23)	9 (−13)	26 (−3)	36 (2)	43 (6)	38 (3)	28 (−2)	15 (−9)	1 (−17)	−19 (−28)	−28 (−33)
Average precipitation inches (mm)	2.71 (69)	2.60 (66)	3.50 (89)	4.88 (124)	5.89 (150)	4.68 (119)	4.09 (104)	4.36 (111)	4.07 (103)	3.35 (85)	3.21 (82)	2.52 (64)	45.86 (1,165)
Average snowfall inches (cm)	2.9 (7.4)	1.3 (3.3)	1.1 (2.8)	0.0 (0.0)	0.0 (0.0)	0.0 (0.0)	0.0 (0.0)	0.0 (0.0)	0.0 (0.0)	0.0 (0.0)	0.4 (1.0)	2.6 (6.6)	8.3 (21)
Average precipitation days (≥ 0.01 in)	6.8	6.7	9.5	9.8	11.1	9.0	7.7	8.1	7.0	7.6	7.6	6.0	96.9
Average snowy days (≥ 0.1 in)	1.6	0.8	0.2	0.0	0.0	0.0	0.0	0.0	0.0	0.0	0.3	1.1	4.0
Source: NOAA

== Education ==
Public education in Lebanon is administered by Lebanon R-III School District, which operates Lebanon High School.

The Lebanon Senior High School Girls Wrestling Team is notable for winning the inaugural MSHSAA State Girls Wrestling Championship in 2019, the first 1st place title in the school's history.

Lebanon has a public library, the Lebanon–Laclede County Library.

== Notable people ==
- Richard P. Bland, congressman from the state of Missouri
- Jim Bohannon, radio news and talk show host
- Ernest R. Breech, business executive
- Justin Britt, lineman for Houston Texans
- Cynthia Coffman, 38th Attorney General of Colorado
- Phil M. Donnelly, 41st and 43rd governor of Missouri
- Michael S. Hopkins, NASA astronaut and Air Force colonel
- Jeff Knight, member of the Missouri House of Representatives
- Antoine Predock, architect and designer
- Jerry Schoonmaker, baseball player for the Washington Senators
- William Tecumseh Vernon, educator, minister and bishop
- Betty Wagoner, professional baseball player for the South Bend Blue Sox
- Lanford Wilson, playwright and winner of the Pulitzer Prize for drama
- Harold Bell Wright, author
- David Gregory Kays, federal judge
- Dean Whipple, federal judge

== See also ==
- List of cities in Missouri
- Lebanon I-44 Speedway
