= Hermitage, Missouri =

City in Missouri, U.S.

- City
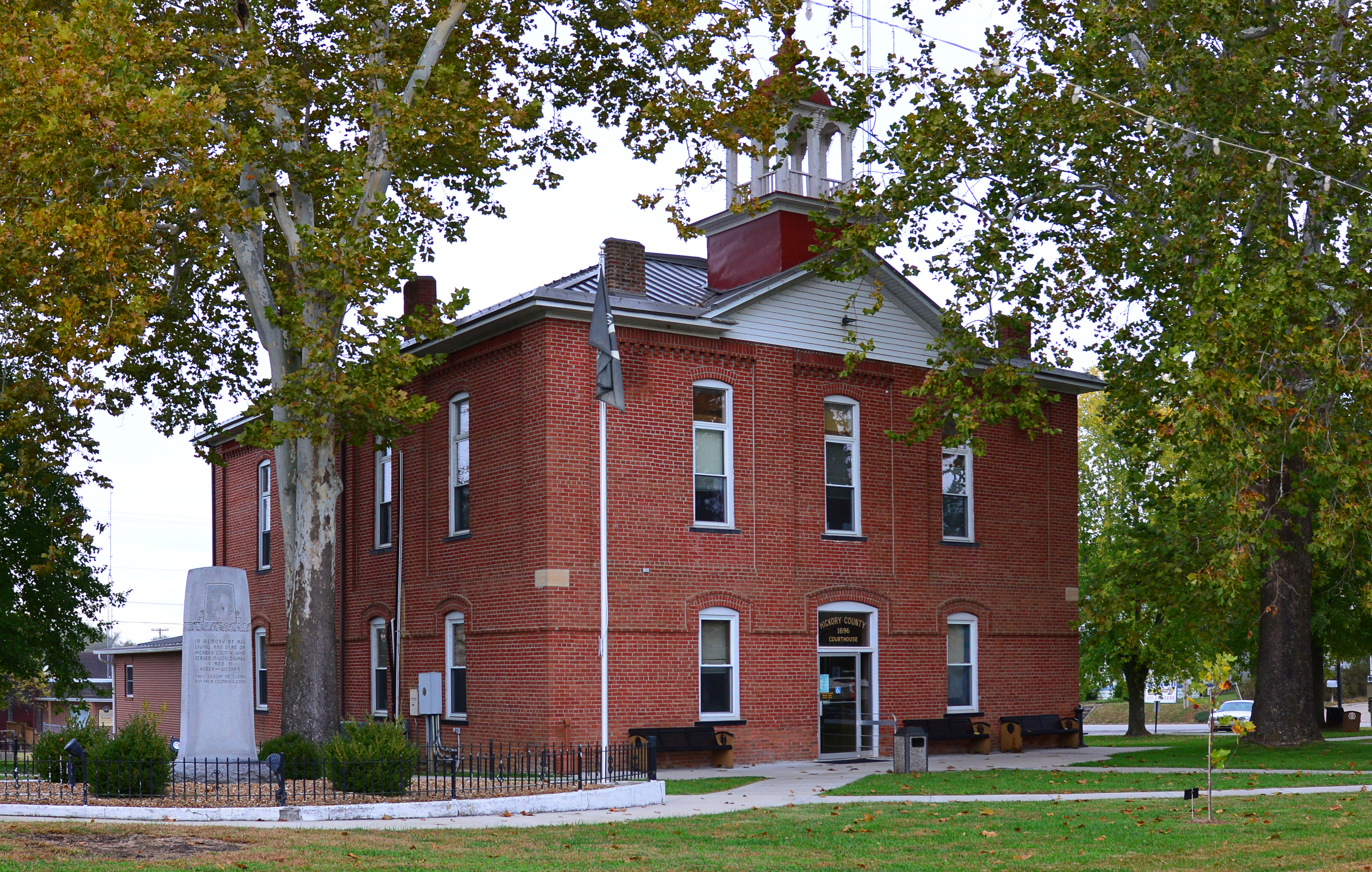
- Hickory County Courthouse in Hermitage

- Location of Hermitage, Missouri
- Coordinates: 37°56′40″N 93°19′33″W
- Country: United States
- State: Missouri
- County: Hickory

Area
  - Total: 1.32 sq mi (3.42 km^{2})
  - Land: 1.30 sq mi (3.36 km^{2})
  - Water: 0.023 sq mi (0.06 km^{2})
- Elevation: 850 ft (260 m)

Population (2020)
  - Total: 621
  - Density: 479.0/sq mi (184.93/km^{2})
- Time zone: UTC-6 (Central (CST))
  - Summer (DST): UTC-5 (CDT)
- ZIP code: 65668
- Area code: 417
- FIPS code: 29-31780
- GNIS feature ID: 2394362

Hermitage is a city in and the county seat of Hickory County, Missouri, United States, on the Pomme de Terre River. The population was 621 at the 2020 census. The John Siddles Williams House on Museum Street in Hermitage, on the National Register of Historic Places since 1980, houses the Hickory County Historical Society Museum and Research Room.

== History ==
Hermitage was founded in 1846. It was named after The Hermitage, the estate of the late president Andrew Jackson in Tennessee. In 1847, it was designated seat of Hickory County, also named for Andrew Jackson, whose nickname was "Old Hickory".

John Siddle Williams House was listed on the National Register of Historic Places in 1980.

== Geography ==
Hermitage is located at 37°56′31″N 93°19′4″W (37.941816, -93.317901). According to the United States Census Bureau, the city has a total area of 1.25 square miles (3.24 km^{2}), all land.

== Demographics ==
Historical population
Census	Pop.	Note	%±
1880	167		—
1950	204		—
1960	328		60.8%
1970	284		−13.4%
1980	384		35.2%
1990	512		33.3%
2000	406		−20.7%
2010	467		15.0%
2020	621		33.0%
U.S. Decennial Census

=== 2010 census ===
As of the census of 2010, there were 467 people, 200 households, and 106 families living in the city. The population density was 373.6 inhabitants per square mile (144.2/km^{2}). There were 237 housing units at an average density of 189.6 per square mile (73.2/km^{2}). The racial makeup of the city was 96.6% White, 0.4% African American, 0.4% Native American, 0.4% from other races, and 2.1% from two or more races. Hispanic or Latino of any race were 0.6% of the population.

There were 200 households, of which 16.5% had children under the age of 18 living with them, 43.5% were married couples living together, 6.0% had a female householder with no husband present, 3.5% had a male householder with no wife present, and 47.0% were non-families. 40.0% of all households were made up of individuals, and 22.5% had someone living alone who was 65 years of age or older. The average household size was 2.01 and the average family size was 2.65.

The median age in the city was 60.3 years. 12.8% of residents were under the age of 18; 4.7% were between the ages of 18 and 24; 15.9% were from 25 to 44; 25.5% were from 45 to 64; and 41.1% were 65 years of age or older. The gender makeup of the city was 46.0% male and 54.0% female.

=== 2000 census ===
At the 2000 census, there were 406 people, 174 households and 108 families living in the city. The population density was 337.9 inhabitants per square mile (130.5/km^{2}). There were 208 housing units at an average density of 173.1 per square mile (66.8/km^{2}). The racial makeup of the city was 93.60% White, 0.25% Native American, 1.23% from other races, and 4.93% from two or more races. Hispanic or Latino of any race were 1.23% of the population.

There were 174 households, of which 26.4% had children under the age of 18 living with them, 50.0% were married couples living together, 7.5% had a female householder with no husband present, and 37.4% were non-families. 35.1% of all households were made up of individuals, and 21.3% had someone living alone who was 65 years of age or older. The average household size was 2.29 and the average family size was 2.94.

Age distribution was 23.6% under the age of 18, 6.9% from 18 to 24, 22.7% from 25 to 44, 21.2% from 45 to 64, and 25.6% who were 65 years of age or older. The median age was 43 years. For every 100 females, there were 98.0 males. For every 100 females age 18 and over, there were 86.7 males.

The median household income was $23,958, and the median family income was $29,583. Males had a median income of $20,417 versus $18,958 for females. The per capita income for the city was $12,944. About 13.2% of families and 18.6% of the population were below the poverty line, including 25.0% of those under age 18 and 15.2% of those age 65 or over.

== Education ==
Public education in Hermitage is administered by Hermitage R-IV School District, which operates one elementary school, one middle school and Hermitage High School.

Hermitage has a lending library, the Hickory County Library.

== See also ==
- List of cities in Missouri
