= Hickory County, Missouri =

County in Missouri, United States

- County
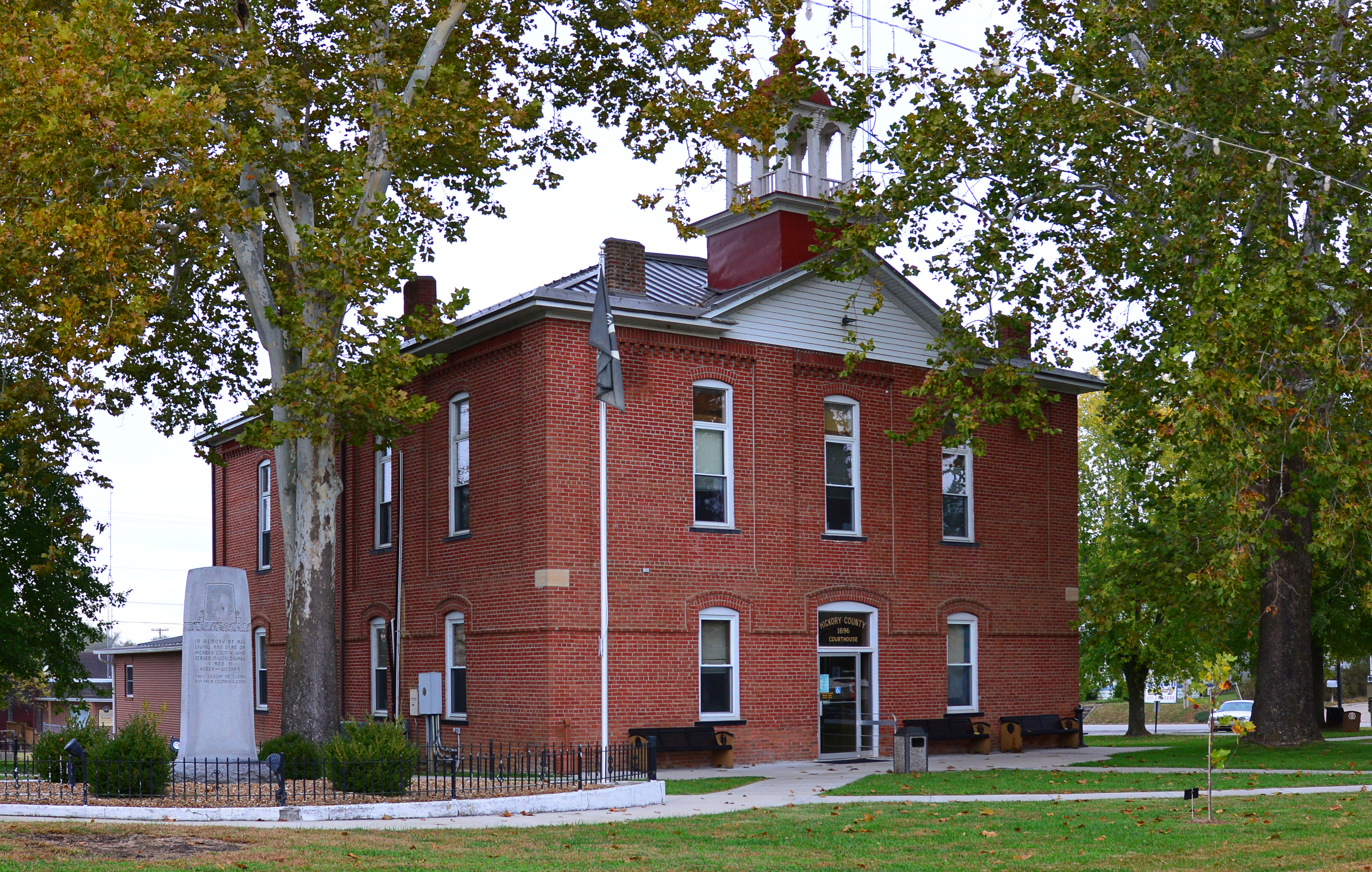
- Hickory County Courthouse in Hermitage

- Location within the U.S. state of Missouri
- Coordinates: 37°56′N 93°19′W
- Country: United States
- State: Missouri
- Founded: February 14, 1845
- Named for: Andrew Jackson, nicknamed "Old Hickory"
- Seat: Hermitage
- Largest city: Hermitage

Area
  - Total: 412 sq mi (1,070 km^{2})
  - Land: 399 sq mi (1,030 km^{2})
  - Water: 13 sq mi (34 km^{2}) 3.1%

Population (2020)
  - Total: 8,279
  - Estimate (2025): 9,044 ▲
  - Density: 20.7/sq mi (8.01/km^{2})
- Time zone: UTC−6 (Central)
  - Summer (DST): UTC−5 (CDT)
- Congressional district: 4th
- Website: Hickory County, Missouri

Hickory County is located in the U.S. state of Missouri. As of the 2020 census, the population was 8,279. Its county seat is Hermitage. The county was organized February 14, 1845, and named after President Andrew Jackson, whose nickname was "Old Hickory." The Pomme de Terre Dam, a Corps of Engineers facility, is located three miles south of Hermitage and forms Lake Pomme de Terre by damming the Pomme de Terre River and Lindley Creek. Truman Reservoir, also a Corps of Engineers facility, floods the Pomme de Terre Reservoir from the northern border of the county southward to the city limits of Hermitage.

== Geography ==
According to the U.S. Census Bureau, the county has a total area of 412 square miles (1,070 km^{2}), of which 399 square miles (1,030 km^{2}) is land and 13 square miles (34 km^{2}) (3.1%) is water. It is the fifth-smallest county in Missouri by area.

=== Adjacent counties ===
- Benton County (north)
- Camden County (east)
- Dallas County (southeast)
- Polk County (south)
- St. Clair County (west)

=== Major highways ===
- U.S. Route 54
- U.S. Route 65
- Route 64
- Route 64B
- Route 83
- Route 123

== Demographics ==
Historical population
| Census | Pop. | Note | %± |
|---|---|---|---|
| 1850 | 2,329 | | — |
| 1860 | 4,705 | | 102.0% |
| 1870 | 6,452 | | 37.1% |
| 1880 | 7,387 | | 14.5% |
| 1890 | 9,453 | | 28.0% |
| 1900 | 9,985 | | 5.6% |
| 1910 | 8,741 | | −12.5% |
| 1920 | 7,033 | | −19.5% |
| 1930 | 6,430 | | −8.6% |
| 1940 | 6,506 | | 1.2% |
| 1950 | 5,387 | | −17.2% |
| 1960 | 4,516 | | −16.2% |
| 1970 | 4,481 | | −0.8% |
| 1980 | 6,367 | | 42.1% |
| 1990 | 7,335 | | 15.2% |
| 2000 | 8,940 | | 21.9% |
| 2010 | 9,627 | | 7.7% |
| 2020 | 8,279 | | −14.0% |
| 2025 (est.) | 9,044 | ▲ | 9.2% |
U.S. Decennial Census; 1790-1960 1900-1990; 1990-2000 2010-2015

=== 2020 census ===
As of the 2020 census, the county had a population of 8,279. The median age was 57.2 years. 16.3% of residents were under the age of 18 and 35.0% of residents were 65 years of age or older. For every 100 females there were 96.7 males, and for every 100 females age 18 and over there were 94.9 males age 18 and over.

The racial makeup of the county was 92.8% White, 0.2% Black or African American, 0.6% American Indian and Alaska Native, 0.2% Asian, 0.0% Native Hawaiian and Pacific Islander, 0.8% from some other race, and 5.4% from two or more races. Hispanic or Latino residents of any race comprised 1.6% of the population. The following table provides additional counts for the racial and ethnic composition reported in that dataset.

Hickory County, Missouri – Racial and ethnic composition Note: the US Census treats Hispanic/Latino as an ethnic category. This table excludes Latinos from the racial categories and assigns them to a separate category. Hispanics/Latinos may be of any race.
| Race / Ethnicity (NH = Non-Hispanic) | Pop 1980 | Pop 1990 | Pop 2000 | Pop 2010 | Pop 2020 | % 1980 | % 1990 | % 2000 | % 2010 | % 2020 |
|---|---|---|---|---|---|---|---|---|---|---|
| White alone (NH) | 6,305 | 7,242 | 8,675 | 9,278 | 7,648 | 99.03% | 98.73% | 97.04% | 96.37% | 92.38% |
| Black or African American alone (NH) | 1 | 5 | 7 | 24 | 11 | 0.02% | 0.07% | 0.08% | 0.25% | 0.13% |
| Native American or Alaska Native alone (NH) | 20 | 53 | 56 | 67 | 42 | 0.31% | 0.72% | 0.63% | 0.70% | 0.51% |
| Asian alone (NH) | 6 | 6 | 10 | 16 | 15 | 0.09% | 0.08% | 0.11% | 0.17% | 0.18% |
| Native Hawaiian or Pacific Islander alone (NH) | x | x | 0 | 8 | 0 | x | x | 0.00% | 0.08% | 0.00% |
| Other race alone (NH) | 4 | 0 | 4 | 1 | 28 | 0.06% | 0.00% | 0.04% | 0.01% | 0.34% |
| Mixed race or Multiracial (NH) | x | x | 120 | 142 | 403 | x | x | 1.34% | 1.48% | 4.87% |
| Hispanic or Latino (any race) | 31 | 29 | 68 | 91 | 132 | 0.49% | 0.40% | 0.76% | 0.95% | 1.59% |
| Total | 6,367 | 7,335 | 8,940 | 9,627 | 8,279 | 100.00% | 100.00% | 100.00% | 100.00% | 100.00% |

0.0% of residents lived in urban areas, while 100.0% lived in rural areas.

There were 3,691 households in the county, of which 18.8% had children under the age of 18 living with them and 23.5% had a female householder with no spouse or partner present. About 31.9% of all households were made up of individuals and 18.7% had someone living alone who was 65 years of age or older.

There were 5,464 housing units, of which 32.4% were vacant. Among occupied housing units, 81.4% were owner-occupied and 18.6% were renter-occupied. The homeowner vacancy rate was 2.6% and the rental vacancy rate was 5.7%.

=== 2000 census ===
As of the census of 2000, there were 8,940 people, 3,911 households, and 2,737 families residing in the county. The population density was 22 people per square mile (8.5 people/km^{2}). There were 6,184 housing units at an average density of 16 units per square mile (6.2/km^{2}). The racial makeup of the county was 97.51% White, 0.08% Black or African American, 0.66% Native American, 0.11% Asian, 0.20% from other races, and 1.44% from two or more races. Approximately 0.76% of the population were Hispanic or Latino of any race.

There were 3,911 households, out of which 22.00% had children under the age of 18 living with them, 59.90% were married couples living together, 6.70% had a female householder with no husband present, and 30.00% were non-families. 26.50% of all households were made up of individuals, and 15.10% had someone living alone who was 65 years of age or older. The average household size was 2.26 and the average family size was 2.70.

In the county, the population was spread out, with 19.90% under the age of 18, 5.30% from 18 to 24, 19.10% from 25 to 44, 29.70% from 45 to 64, and 26.10% who were 65 years of age or older. The median age was 50 years. For every 100 females there were 96.00 males. For every 100 females age 18 and over, there were 92.70 males.

The median income for a household in the county was $25,346, and the median income for a family was $28,779. Males had a median income of $22,679 versus $17,610 for females. The per capita income for the county was $13,536. About 13.00% of families and 19.70% of the population were below the poverty line, including 32.90% of those under age 18 and 11.00% of those age 65 or over.

== Education ==
=== Public schools ===
- Hermitage R-IV School District – Hermitage
  - Hermitage Elementary School (PK-05)
  - Hermitage Middle School (06-08)
  - Hermitage High School (09-12)
- Hickory County R-I School District – Urbana
  - Skyline Elementary School (K-04)
  - Skyline Middle School (05-08)
  - Skyline High School (09-12)
- Weaubleau R-III School District – Weaubleau
  - Weaubleau Elementary School (PK-06)
  - Weaubleau High School (07-12)
- Wheatland R-II School District
  - Wheatland Elementary School (PK-06)
  - Wheatland High School (07-12)

=== Public libraries ===
- Hickory County Library

== Politics ==
=== Local ===
The Republican Party predominantly controls politics at the local level in Hickory County. Republicans hold all but two of the elected positions in the county.

Hickory County, Missouri

Elected countywide officials
| Assessor | Clint Baker | Republican |
| Circuit Clerk | Cee Cee Smith | Republican |
| County Clerk | Jeannie Lindsey | Republican |
| Collector | Karen Stokes | Republican |
| Commissioner (presiding) | Robert Sawyer | Republican |
| Commissioner (district 1) | Larry Ligthtfoot | Democratic |
| Commissioner (district 2) | Rick Pearson | Republican |
| Coroner | Connie Boller | Republican |
| Prosecuting Attorney | Michael Brown | Republican |
| Public Administrator | Vanessa Prettyman | Republican |
| Recorder | Pamela Hutton | Republican |
| Sheriff | Greg Burke | Republican |
| Surveyor | T. Philip Nasalroad | Democratic |
| Treasurer | Kenny Ratliff | Republican |

=== State ===
Past Gubernatorial Elections Results
| Year | Republican | Democratic | Third Parties |
|---|---|---|---|
| 2024 | 77.33% 3,915 | 20.56% 1,041 | 2.11% 107 |
| 2020 | 79.70% 4,037 | 18.30% 929 | 2.00% 108 |
| 2016 | 62.30% 2,936 | 34.12% 1,608 | 3.58% 169 |
| 2012 | 46.65% 2,177 | 50.01% 2,334 | 3.34% 156 |
| 2008 | 35.62% 1,820 | 60.96% 3,115 | 3.42% 175 |
| 2004 | 56.54% 2,750 | 42.17% 2,051 | 1.30% 63 |
| 2000 | 47.74% 1,869 | 50.46% 2,132 | 1.80% 76 |
| 1996 | 47.36% 1,869 | 49.90% 1,969 | 2.74% 108 |

All of Hickory County is a part of Missouri's 126th District in the Missouri House of Representatives and is represented by Jim Kalberloh (R-Lowry City).

Missouri House of Representatives — District 125 — Hickory County (2016)
| Party | Candidate | Votes | % | ±% |
|---|---|---|---|---|
| Republican | Warren D. Love | 3,977 | 100.00% | |

Missouri House of Representatives — District 125 — Hickory County (2014)
| Party | Candidate | Votes | % | ±% |
|---|---|---|---|---|
| Republican | Warren D. Love | 2,006 | 100.00% | |

Missouri House of Representatives — District 125 — Hickory County (2012)
| Party | Candidate | Votes | % | ±% |
|---|---|---|---|---|
| Republican | Warren D. Love | 3,931 | 100.00% | |

All of Hickory County is a part of Missouri's 28th District in the Missouri Senate. The seat is held by Sandy Crawford, who was elected after the previous incumbent, Mike Parson, was elected lieutenant governor in 2016.

Missouri Senate — District 28 — Hickory County (2014)
| Party | Candidate | Votes | % | ±% |
|---|---|---|---|---|
| Republican | Mike Parson | 2,075 | 100.00% | |

=== Federal ===
U.S. Senate — Missouri — Hickory County (2016)
| Party | Candidate | Votes | % | ±% |
|---|---|---|---|---|
| Republican | Roy Blunt | 2,959 | 62.93% | +20.24 |
| Democratic | Jason Kander | 1,490 | 31.69% | −17.67 |
| Libertarian | Jonathan Dine | 135 | 2.87% | −5.08 |
| Green | Johnathan McFarland | 69 | 1.47% | +1.47 |
| Constitution | Fred Ryman | 49 | 1.04% | +1.04 |

U.S. Senate — Missouri — Hickory County (2012)
| Party | Candidate | Votes | % | ±% |
|---|---|---|---|---|
| Republican | Todd Akin | 1,982 | 42.69% | |
| Democratic | Claire McCaskill | 2,292 | 49.36% | |
| Libertarian | Jonathan Dine | 369 | 7.95% | |

All of Hickory County is included in Missouri's 4th Congressional District and is currently represented by Vicky Hartzler (R-Harrisonville) in the U.S. House of Representatives.

U.S. House of Representatives — Missouri's 4th Congressional District — St. Clair County (2016)
| Party | Candidate | Votes | % | ±% |
|---|---|---|---|---|
| Republican | Vicky Hartzler | 3,434 | 74.44% | +1.87 |
| Democratic | Gordon Christensen | 994 | 21.55% | −1.76 |
| Libertarian | Mark Bliss | 185 | 4.01% | −0.11 |

U.S. House of Representatives — Missouri's 4th Congressional District — St. Clair County (2014)
| Party | Candidate | Votes | % | ±% |
|---|---|---|---|---|
| Republican | Vicky Hartzler | 1,778 | 72.57% | +8.57 |
| Democratic | Nate Irvin | 571 | 23.31% | −9.02 |
| Libertarian | Herschel L. Young | 101 | 4.12% | +1.20 |

U.S. House of Representatives — Missouri’s 4th Congressional District — St. Clair County (2012)
| Party | Candidate | Votes | % | ±% |
|---|---|---|---|---|
| Republican | Vicky Hartzler | 2,963 | 64.00% | |
| Democratic | Teresa Hensley | 1,497 | 32.33% | |
| Libertarian | Thomas Hollbrook | 135 | 2.92% | |
| Constitution | Greg Cowan | 35 | 0.75% | |

==== Political culture ====
United States presidential election results for Hickory County, Missouri
| Year | Republican | | Democratic | | Third party(ies) | |
| Year | No. | % | No. | % | No. | % |
|---|---|---|---|---|---|---|
| 1888 | 1,076 | 57.60% | 628 | 33.62% | 164 | 8.78% |
| 1892 | 927 | 49.84% | 423 | 22.74% | 510 | 27.42% |
| 1896 | 1,194 | 53.14% | 1,045 | 46.51% | 8 | 0.36% |
| 1900 | 1,270 | 60.05% | 777 | 36.74% | 68 | 3.22% |
| 1904 | 1,245 | 66.65% | 531 | 28.43% | 92 | 4.93% |
| 1908 | 1,182 | 65.52% | 561 | 31.10% | 61 | 3.38% |
| 1912 | 735 | 45.82% | 421 | 26.25% | 448 | 27.93% |
| 1916 | 1,144 | 64.74% | 552 | 31.24% | 71 | 4.02% |
| 1920 | 2,131 | 78.55% | 532 | 19.61% | 50 | 1.84% |
| 1924 | 1,895 | 70.71% | 722 | 26.94% | 63 | 2.35% |
| 1928 | 2,233 | 84.68% | 399 | 15.13% | 5 | 0.19% |
| 1932 | 1,586 | 63.98% | 878 | 35.42% | 15 | 0.61% |
| 1936 | 2,329 | 71.73% | 910 | 28.03% | 8 | 0.25% |
| 1940 | 2,496 | 75.84% | 787 | 23.91% | 8 | 0.24% |
| 1944 | 2,171 | 79.41% | 560 | 20.48% | 3 | 0.11% |
| 1948 | 1,728 | 70.19% | 733 | 29.77% | 1 | 0.04% |
| 1952 | 2,054 | 76.47% | 622 | 23.16% | 10 | 0.37% |
| 1956 | 1,661 | 70.50% | 695 | 29.50% | 0 | 0.00% |
| 1960 | 1,885 | 75.40% | 615 | 24.60% | 0 | 0.00% |
| 1964 | 1,157 | 57.53% | 854 | 42.47% | 0 | 0.00% |
| 1968 | 1,484 | 66.55% | 537 | 24.08% | 209 | 9.37% |
| 1972 | 1,851 | 74.85% | 622 | 25.15% | 0 | 0.00% |
| 1976 | 1,403 | 49.72% | 1,398 | 49.54% | 21 | 0.74% |
| 1980 | 1,893 | 58.92% | 1,248 | 38.84% | 72 | 2.24% |
| 1984 | 2,190 | 64.37% | 1,212 | 35.63% | 0 | 0.00% |
| 1988 | 2,043 | 54.82% | 1,677 | 45.00% | 7 | 0.19% |
| 1992 | 1,259 | 31.03% | 1,929 | 47.54% | 870 | 21.44% |
| 1996 | 1,491 | 38.11% | 1,858 | 47.49% | 563 | 14.39% |
| 2000 | 2,172 | 51.25% | 1,961 | 46.27% | 105 | 2.48% |
| 2004 | 2,791 | 57.36% | 2,043 | 41.99% | 32 | 0.66% |
| 2008 | 2,850 | 55.72% | 2,171 | 42.44% | 94 | 1.84% |
| 2012 | 2,835 | 60.58% | 1,733 | 37.03% | 112 | 2.39% |
| 2016 | 3,542 | 74.40% | 1,016 | 21.34% | 203 | 4.26% |
| 2020 | 3,966 | 78.07% | 1,056 | 20.79% | 58 | 1.14% |
| 2024 | 4,108 | 80.23% | 978 | 19.10% | 34 | 0.66% |

=== Missouri presidential preference primary (2008) ===
Former U.S. Senator Hillary Clinton (D-New York) received more votes, a total of 1,056, than any candidate from either party in Hickory County during the 2008 presidential primary.

== Communities ==
=== Cities and Towns ===
- Cross Timbers
- Hermitage (county seat)
- Preston
- Weaubleau
- Wheatland

=== Unincorporated communities ===
- Avery
- Elkton
- Jordan
- Nemo
- Pittsburg
- Quincy
- White Cloud

== Notable people ==
- Mike Parson - 57th Governor of Missouri
- Sally Rand – legendary burlesque dancer

== See also ==
- National Register of Historic Places listings in Hickory County, Missouri
