= National Register of Historic Places listings in Greene County, Missouri =

Location of Greene County in Missouri

This is a list of the National Register of Historic Places listings in Greene County, Missouri.

This is intended to be a complete list of the properties and districts on the National Register of Historic Places in Greene County, Missouri, United States. Latitude and longitude coordinates are provided for many National Register properties and districts; these locations may be seen together in a map.

There are 74 properties and districts listed on the National Register in the county. Another property was once listed but has been removed.

This National Park Service list is complete through NPS recent listings posted December 12, 2025.

== Current listings ==
	Name on the Register	Image	Date listed	Location	City or town	Description
1	Abou Ben Adhem Shrine Mosque	Abou Ben Adhem Shrine Mosque	September 9, 1982 (#82003137)	601 E. St. Louis; 37°12′34″N 93°17′10″W	Springfield	
2	Ambassador Apartments	Ambassador Apartments	October 29, 2008 (#08001023)	1235 E. Elm St. 37°12′20″N 93°16′28″W	Springfield	
3	Elijah Teague Anderson House	Elijah Teague Anderson House	November 14, 1980 (#80002353)	406 N. Pine St. 37°07′22″N 93°28′44″W	Republic	
4	Bailey School	Bailey School	November 2, 2016 (#16000749)	501 W. Central St. 37°13′03″N 93°17′42″W	Springfield	
5	Bentley House	Bentley House	November 14, 1980 (#80002354)	603 E. Calhoun St. 37°13′21″N 93°17′06″W	Springfield	
6	Benton Avenue AME Church	Benton Avenue AME Church	October 14, 2001 (#01001109)	830 N. Benton Ave. 37°13′02″N 93°17′14″W	Springfield	
7	Berry Cemetery	Berry Cemetery	November 13, 2004 (#04001224)	1431 W. Farm Road 74; 37°19′26″N 93°36′00″W	Ash Grove	
8	Beverly Apartments	Beverly Apartments	July 10, 2017 (#100001299)	529 Cherry St. 37°12′15″N 93°17′14″W	Springfield	
9	Boegel and Hine Flour Mill-Wommack Mill	Boegel and Hine Flour Mill-Wommack Mill	November 6, 1986 (#86003140)	East side of N. Main St., south of its intersection with Route 125; 37°22′59″N 93°09′01″W	Fair Grove	
10	Nathan Boone House	Nathan Boone House	October 1, 1969 (#69000103)	1.75 miles (2.82 km) north of Ash Grove on Highway V 37°20′46″N 93°34′35″W	Ash Grove	
11	Camp Manor Apartments	Camp Manor Apartments	December 6, 2005 (#05001374)	423 E. Elm St. 37°12′18″N 93°17′21″W	Springfield	
12	Campbell Avenue Historic District	Campbell Avenue Historic District	June 25, 1999 (#99000714)	200 and 300 blocks of S. Campbell Ave. and the 300 block of Park Central West; also 318 and 322-326 S. Campbell Ave. 37°12′30″N 93°17′38″W	Springfield	Second set of boundaries represents a boundary increase of December 23, 2005
13	Christ Episcopal Church	Christ Episcopal Church	March 26, 1987 (#87000514)	601 E. Walnut St. 37°12′25″N 93°17′11″W	Springfield	
14	College Apartments	College Apartments	May 1, 2003 (#03000319)	408 E. Walnut St. 37°12′31″N 93°17′20″W	Springfield	
15	Commercial Street Historic District	Commercial Street Historic District	May 24, 1983 (#83000991)	Commercial St. 37°13′47″N 93°17′23″W	Springfield	
16	Day House	Day House	November 7, 1976 (#76001110)	614 South St. 37°12′12″N 93°17′31″W	Springfield	
17	Fallin Brothers Building	Fallin Brothers Building	July 25, 2012 (#12000435)	211-229 S. Market Ave. 37°12′30″N 93°17′44″W	Springfield	part of the Springfield Multiple Property Submission
18	Fallin Garage	Fallin Garage	September 15, 2023 (#100009384)	423 West Olive St. 37°12′35″N 93°17′43″W	Springfield	
19	Finkbiner Building	Finkbiner Building	May 25, 2005 (#05000469)	509-513 W. Olive St. 37°12′43″N 93°17′46″W	Springfield	
20	Franklin Springfield Motor Co. Building	Franklin Springfield Motor Co. Building	November 15, 2006 (#06001027)	312-314 E. Olive St. 37°12′40″N 93°17′26″W	Springfield	
21	Gillioz Theater	Gillioz Theater	July 9, 1991 (#91000887)	325 Park Central E. 37°12′30″N 93°17′20″W	Springfield	
22	Gilmore Barn	Gilmore Barn	April 8, 1994 (#94000316)	U.S. Route 160, 3.5 miles (5.6 km) east of Ash Grove; 37°19′24″N 93°30′43″W	Ash Grove	
23	Gottfried Furniture Company Building	Gottfried Furniture Company Building	December 18, 2007 (#07001289)	326 Boonville Ave. 37°12′45″N 93°17′31″W	Springfield	
24	Greene County Courthouse	Greene County Courthouse	November 14, 2007 (#07001185)	940 Boonville Ave. 37°13′12″N 93°17′31″W	Springfield	
25	Heer's Department Store	Heer's Department Store	October 24, 2002 (#02001207)	138 Park Central Square; 37°12′33″N 93°17′34″W	Springfield	
26	Heercleff		November 7, 2016 (#16000763)	6405 S. Campbell Ave. 37°05′55″N 93°17′52″W	Springfield	
27	Holland Building	Holland Building	November 15, 2000 (#00001373)	205 Park Central East; 37°12′33″N 93°17′28″W	Springfield	
28	Hotel Sansone		May 5, 2000 (#00000430)	312 Park Central East; 37°12′32″N 93°17′25″W	Springfield	
29	Jefferson Street Footbridge	Jefferson Street Footbridge	September 2, 2003 (#03000865)	Jefferson Ave. between Commercial and Chase Sts. 37°13′58″N 93°17′21″W	Springfield	
30	Keet-McElhany House	Keet-McElhany House	March 22, 1984 (#84002545)	435 E. Walnut St. 37°12′24″N 93°17′20″W	Springfield	
31	J.E. King Manufacturing Company	J.E. King Manufacturing Company	July 27, 2005 (#05000751)	1350 St. Louis St. 37°12′07″N 93°17′57″W	Springfield	
32	Robert B. and Vitae A. Kite Apartment Building	Robert B. and Vitae A. Kite Apartment Building	January 28, 2004 (#03001504)	769-771 South Ave. 37°12′09″N 93°17′34″W	Springfield	
33	Landers Theater	Landers Theater	August 12, 1977 (#77000806)	311 E. Walnut; 37°12′26″N 93°17′27″W	Springfield	
34	Lincoln School	Lincoln School	May 31, 2000 (#00000508)	815 N. Sherman Ave. 37°13′00″N 93°16′53″W	Springfield	
35	Marquette Hotel	Marquette Hotel	May 5, 2000 (#00000431)	400 East Walnut; 37°12′25″N 93°17′21″W	Springfield	
36	Marx-Hurlburt Building		September 2, 2003 (#03000864)	311-315 E. Park Central Sq. 37°12′40″N 93°17′26″W	Springfield	
37	McDaniel Building	McDaniel Building	October 22, 2014 (#14000871)	316 Park Central E. 37°12′33″N 93°17′28″W	Springfield	
38	Mid-Town Historic District		July 13, 1989 (#89000938)	Roughly bounded by Pacific, Clay, Pythian, Summit, Calhoun, Washington, Central, Benton, Division, and Jefferson; also roughly along N. Robberson Ave. and N. Jefferson Ave. 37°13′22″N 93°17′06″W	Springfield	Second set of boundaries represents a boundary increase of August 9, 2002
39	Netter-Ullman Building	Netter-Ullman Building	April 18, 2003 (#03000255)	317 Park Central East; 37°12′40″N 93°17′15″W	Springfield	
40	D.M. Oberman Manufacturing Co. Building	D.M. Oberman Manufacturing Co. Building	April 18, 2002 (#02000379)	600 N. Boonville Ave. 37°12′58″N 93°17′31″W	Springfield	
41	Old Calaboose	Old Calaboose	November 14, 1980 (#80002355)	409 W. McDaniel St. 37°12′30″N 93°17′40″W	Springfield	
42	Palace Hotel	Palace Hotel	November 27, 2002 (#02001419)	501 College St. 37°12′40″N 93°17′44″W	Springfield	
43	Pearl Apartments and Windsor Apartments	Pearl Apartments and Windsor Apartments	December 6, 2005 (#05001376)	728 and 722 S. Jefferson St. 37°12′07″N 93°17′21″W	Springfield	
44	Pearson Creek Archeological District		October 11, 1978 (#78001647)	Address Restricted	Springfield	
45	Producers Ice and Manufacturing Company	Producers Ice and Manufacturing Company	January 29, 2018 (#100002031)	524 W Chase St. 37°13′51″N 93°17′47″W	Springfield	
46	Producers Produce Company Plant	Producers Produce Company Plant	April 12, 2010 (#10000181)	501 N. Main Ave. 37°07′26″N 93°28′49″W	Springfield	
47	Pythian Home of Missouri	Pythian Home of Missouri	October 7, 2009 (#09000812)	1451 E. Pythian St. 37°13′17″N 93°16′07″W	Springfield	
48	Rail Haven Motel	Rail Haven Motel	May 10, 2010 (#10000245)	203 S. Glenstone Ave. 37°12′30″N 93°15′46″W	Springfield	
49	Roberts Farmstead		January 29, 2025 (#100011400)	1120 South Farm Road 193 (primary); 715 South Farm Road 193; 37°11′33″N 93°11′54″W	Springfield	
50	Rock Fountain Court Historic District		April 2, 2003 (#03000179)	2400 W. College St. 37°12′31″N 93°19′28″W	Springfield	
51	Route 66 Steak 'n Shake	Route 66 Steak 'n Shake	August 1, 2012 (#12000462)	1158 E. St. Louis St. 37°12′34″N 93°16′35″W	Springfield	part of the Route 66 in Missouri Multiple Property Submission
52	St. John's Mercy Hospital Building	St. John's Mercy Hospital Building	September 2, 2003 (#03000867)	620 W. Scott; 37°13′17″N 93°17′49″W	Springfield	
53	St. Paul Block	St. Paul Block	January 15, 2009 (#08001322)	401 South Ave. 37°12′26″N 93°17′32″W	Springfield	
54	Henry Schneider Building	Henry Schneider Building	August 24, 2006 (#06000535)	600 College St.-219-231 S. Main Ave. 37°12′38″N 93°17′50″W	Springfield	
55	South Avenue Commercial Historic District		June 25, 1999 (#99000713)	Walnut and Pershing Sts., South and Robberson Aves. 37°12′23″N 93°17′30″W	Springfield	
56	South-McDaniel-Patton Commercial Historic District		March 7, 2003 (#03000088)	Roughly bounded by S. Campbell Ave., W. McDaniel St., South Ave., and W. Walnut St. 37°12′34″N 93°17′35″W	Springfield	
57	Springfield Furniture Company	Springfield Furniture Company	July 5, 2006 (#06000536)	601 N. National; 37°12′58″N 93°16′35″W	Springfield	
58	Springfield Grocer Company Warehouse	Springfield Grocer Company Warehouse	July 8, 2010 (#10000462)	323 North Patton Ave. 37°12′38″N 93°17′37″W	Springfield	
59	Springfield National Cemetery	Springfield National Cemetery	August 27, 1999 (#99001045)	1702 E. Seminole St. 37°10′12″N 93°15′51″W	Springfield	
60	Springfield Public Square Historic District	Springfield Public Square Historic District	May 5, 2006 (#06000331)	149, 138, 137, 134, 127, 132, 124, and 122 Park Central Sq., and 219 and 221 South Ave.; also the eastern side of Public Square, part of the 300 block of Park Central E., and the northern side of the 200 block of W. Olive; 37°12′40″N 93°17′34″W	Springfield	Second set of boundaries represents a boundary increase of January 13, 2010
61	Springfield Seed Co. Office and Warehouse	Springfield Seed Co. Office and Warehouse	September 14, 2006 (#06000863)	319 N. Main Ave. 37°12′44″N 93°17′49″W	Springfield	
62	Springfield Warehouse and Industrial Historic District		June 25, 1999 (#99000715)	E. Water, W. Mill and W. Phelps Sts. and Boonville Ave. 37°12′41″N 93°17′30″W	Springfield	
63	Stone Chapel	Stone Chapel	October 21, 1982 (#82000583)	Benton and Central Sts. 37°13′04″N 93°17′13″W	Springfield	
64	Trail of Tears Roadbed Segment on Josiah Danforth Farm		July 23, 2018 (#16000342)	Address Restricted	Strafford vicinity	
65	U.S. Customhouse and Post Office	U.S. Customhouse and Post Office	June 27, 1979 (#79001360)	830 Boonville Ave. 37°12′57″N 93°17′31″W	Springfield	
66	Walnut Street Commercial Historic District	Walnut Street Commercial Historic District	June 25, 1999 (#99000717)	Walnut St. 37°12′26″N 93°17′27″W	Springfield	
67	Walnut Street Historic District		March 21, 1985 (#85000623)	Roughly bounded by McDaniel, Walnut, and Elm Sts. and the Sherman Parkway; also roughly along E. Walnut St. in the 700 and 800 blocks 37°12′24″N 93°15′59″W	Springfield	Second set of boundaries represents a boundary increase of August 5, 2002
68	West Walnut Street Commercial Historic District		March 20, 2002 (#02000211)	Roughly the 300 and 400 blocks of W. Walnut St., and the 300 and 400 blocks of S. Campbell Ave. 37°12′32″N 93°17′40″W	Springfield	
69	E. M. Wilhoit Building	E. M. Wilhoit Building	January 31, 2005 (#04001576)	300-330 E. Pershing St. 37°12′29″N 93°17′25″W	Springfield	
70	Edward M. and Della C. Wilhoit House	Edward M. and Della C. Wilhoit House	December 23, 2004 (#04001384)	903 S. Weller Ave. 37°12′00″N 93°16′07″W	Springfield	
71	Wilshire Apartments		April 10, 2008 (#08000266)	520 S. Jefferson; 37°12′17″N 93°17′23″W	Springfield	
72	Wilson's Creek National Battlefield	Wilson's Creek National Battlefield	October 15, 1966 (#66000113)	Southwest of Springfield on Route 174; 37°06′06″N 93°24′31″W	Springfield	A boundary increase was approved September 16, 2024.
73	Wise Feed Company Building	Wise Feed Company Building	January 6, 2003 (#02001685)	438-440 S. Campbell Ave. 37°12′20″N 93°17′34″W	Springfield	
74	Woods-Evertz Stove Company Historic District	Woods-Evertz Stove Company Historic District	October 23, 2003 (#03001071)	Area bounded by N. Jefferson Ave., E Phelps St., N. Robberson Ave., and E. Tampa St. 37°12′55″N 93°17′26″W	Springfield	

== Former listing ==
	Name on the Register	Image	Date listed	Date removed	Location	City or town	Description
1	Second Baptist Church		December 22, 2000 (#00001620)	October 6, 2001	729 North Washington; 37°12′57″N 93°17′11″W	Springfield	Delisted when it was disassembled and moved 300 feet across the street in 2000.

== See also ==
- List of National Historic Landmarks in Missouri
- National Register of Historic Places listings in Missouri
