= South Avenue =

South Avenue may refer to:

- South Avenue (Makati)
- South Avenue (Syracuse, New York)
- South Avenue Commercial Historic District, Springfield, Missouri
- Timog Avenue in Quezon City, formerly named South Avenue
