= Route 66 Steak 'n Shake =

- U.S. National Register of Historic Places
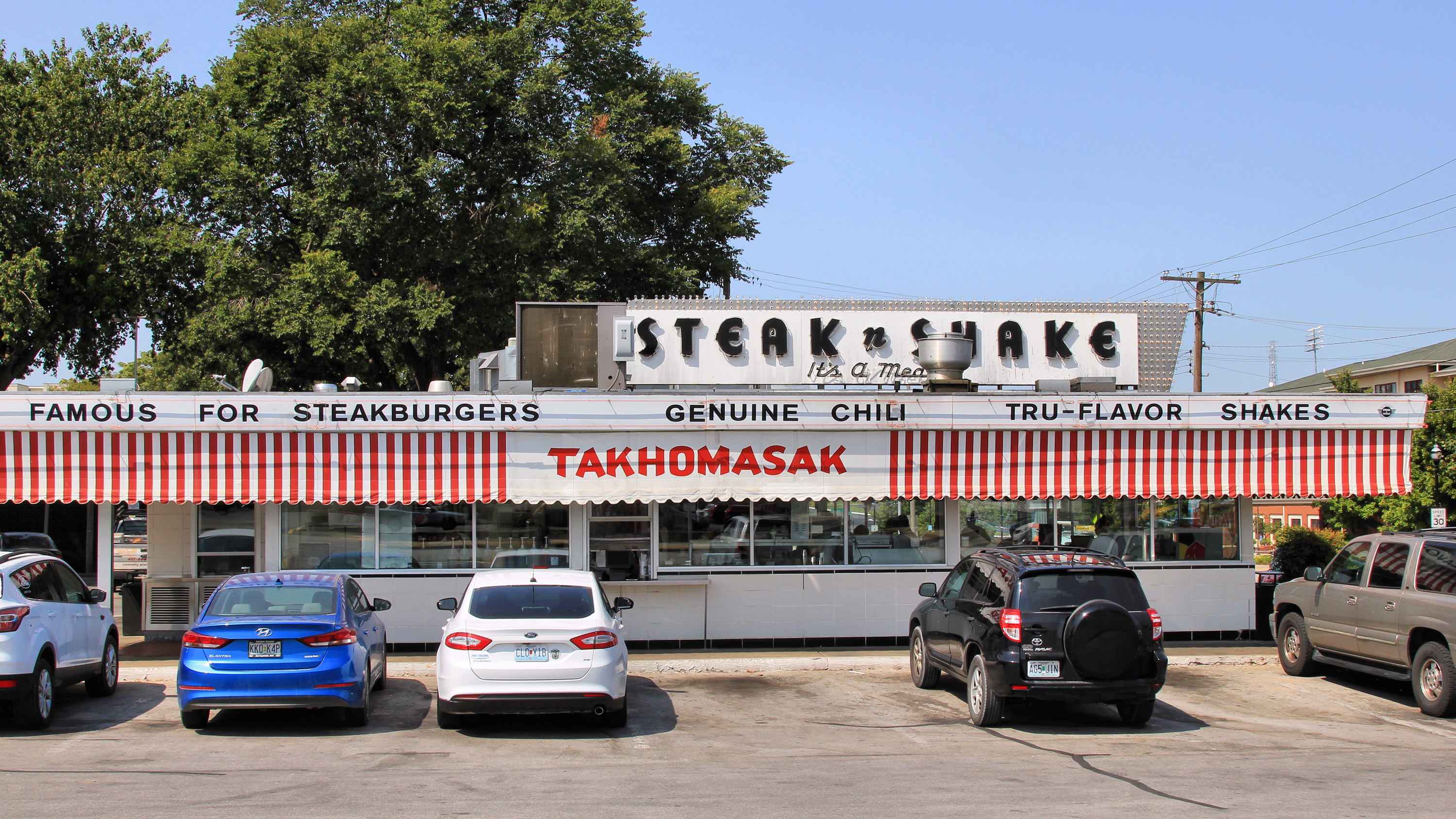

- Location within Missouri Location within the United States
- Location: 1158 E. St. Louis St., Springfield, Missouri
- Coordinates: 37°12′34″N 93°16′35″W
- Area: 0.66 acres (0.27 ha)
- Built: 1962
- MPS: Route 66 in Missouri MPS
- NRHP reference No.: 12000462
- Added to NRHP: August 1, 2012

Route 66 Steak 'n Shake, also known as the St. Louis Street Steak In Shake, is a historic Steak 'n Shake restaurant located at Springfield, Missouri, United States, that is listed on the National Register of Historic Places (NRHP).

== Description ==
The restaurant was built in 1962 along former U.S. Highway 66, and is a one-story, rectangular plan, concrete building with a flat roof. It is faced with glazed ceramic tiles and sits on a poured concrete foundation. Also on the property are two free-standing original signs.

It was listed on the National Register of Historic Places in 2012.

== See also ==
- National Register of Historic Places listings in Greene County, Missouri
