= South–McDaniel–Patton Commercial Historic District =

Historic district in Missouri, United States

- U.S. National Register of Historic Places
- U.S. Historic district
- Location within Missouri Location within the United States
- Location: Roughly bounded by S. Campbell Ave., W. McDaniel St., South Ave., and W. Walnut St., Springfield, Missouri
- Coordinates: 37°12′34″N 93°17′35″W
- Area: 2.4 acres (0.97 ha)
- Architectural style: Late Victorian
- MPS: Springfield, Missouri MPS (Additional Documentation)
- NRHP reference No.: 03000088
- Added to NRHP: March 7, 2003

South–McDaniel–Patton Commercial Historic District is a national historic district located at Springfield, Greene County, Missouri. The district encompasses 12 contributing buildings in a commercial section of Springfield. The district developed between about 1872 and 1952, and includes representative examples of Late Victorian style architecture. Notable buildings include the Crenshaw Hardware Co. building (c. 1884), Rogers & Baldwin Hardware Co. building (1872, c. 1891), John W. Williams Building (c. 1926), Queen City Meat Market building (c. 1884), and Phoenix Building (c. 1884).

It was added to the National Register of Historic Places in 2003.
