= St. Paul Block =

- U.S. National Register of Historic Places
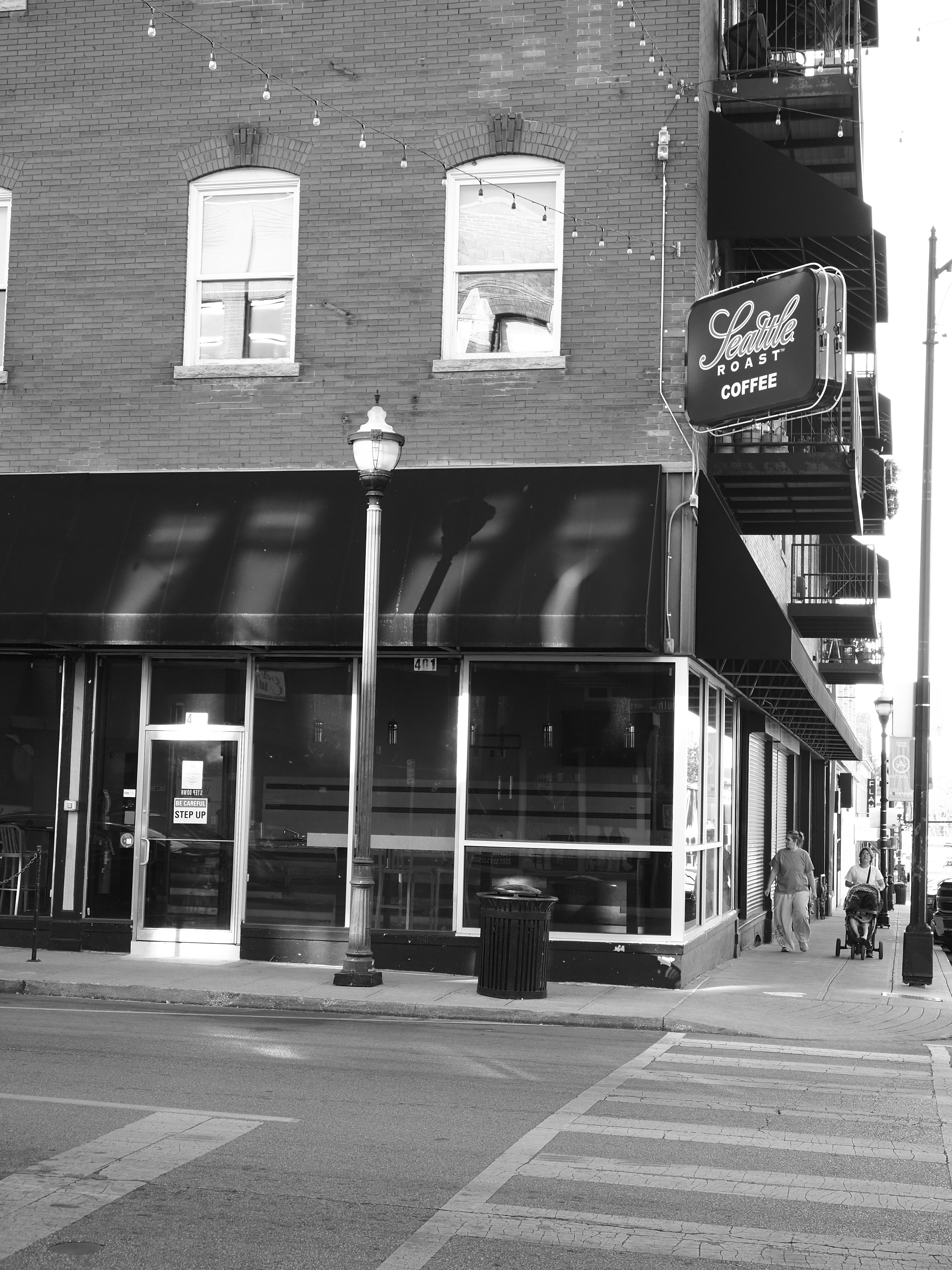

- Location within Missouri Location within the United States
- Location: 401 S. Ave., Springfield, Missouri
- Coordinates: 37°12′32″N 93°17′33″W
- Area: less than one acre
- Built: 1905
- Architectural style: Early Commercial, Downtown Commercial
- MPS: Springfield MPS
- NRHP reference No.: 08001322
- Added to NRHP: January 15, 2009

St. Paul Block, also known as the Hermann-Brownlow Building and Hermann-Sanford Building, is a historic commercial building located at Springfield, Greene County, Missouri. It was built in 1905, and is a three-story, brick commercial building with a flat roof and open storefronts.

It was listed on the National Register of Historic Places in 2009.
