= Holland Building =

- U.S. National Register of Historic Places
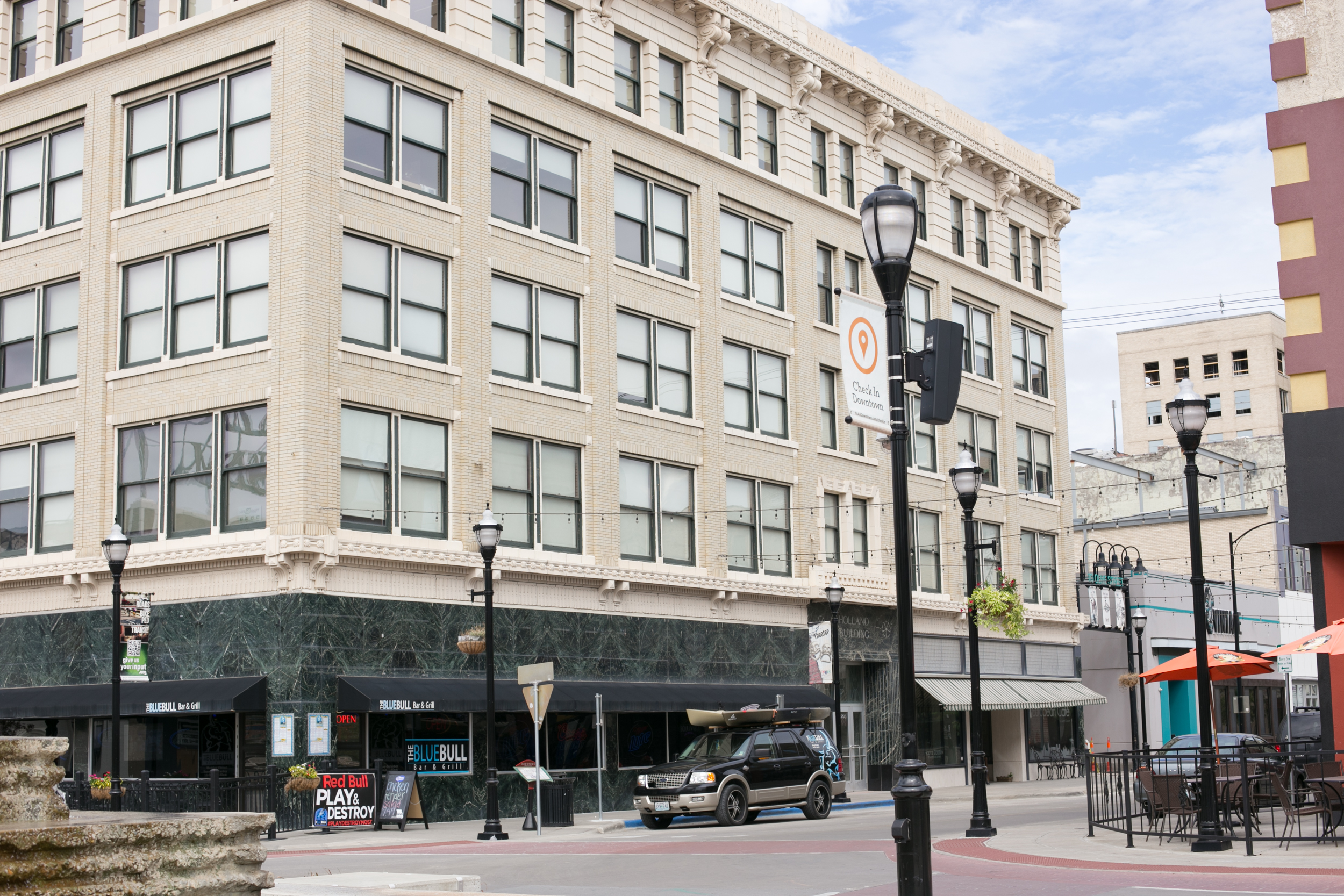
- Holland Building, September 2014

- Location within Missouri Location within the United States
- Location: 205 Park Central East, Springfield, Missouri
- Coordinates: 37°12′33″N 93°17′28″W
- Area: less than one acre
- Built: 1914
- Architect: Shepard, Farrar and Wiser Architects; Jarrett, C.L.
- MPS: Springfield MPS
- NRHP reference No.: 00001373
- Added to NRHP: November 15, 2000

The Holland Building, also known as the Mrs. Clifford L. Jarrett Building, is a historic commercial building located in Springfield, Missouri. Built in 1914, it is a five-story, rectangular commercial building sheathed in marble, blond brick, and cream-colored glazed terra cotta. It features a heavy bracketed cornice of glazed terra cotta. It was listed on the National Register of Historic Places in 2002.

== History ==
Louise Holland Jarrett constructed the building in 1914 in honor of her father, T.B. Holland (Telmachus Blondville Holland), who was a successful banker and attributed to be the "wealthiest citizen in Greene County"

One year prior, a major fire devastated much of downtown Springfield, so special construction plans for the Holland Building called for the latest fireproofing methods. Reinforced concrete structural systems and masonry on the exterior walls were used, to ensure safety and longevity. A state-of-the-art fire plug and standpipe were attached to the building, allowing a fire engine to attached directly, forcing water to the roof and upper floors.

Often referenced as the most well preserved building in downtown Springfield, major remodel years include 1948 and 2000, the latter reporting being $2.5 million, and both retaining the building's style and aesthetic. The roofline parapet, cornice and cornice brackets, and corbeling are all influenced by beaux arts classicism, while the rest of the building is primarily commercial style.

Originally constructed as an office building with retail on the ground level, the building remains one of the only office buildings of the early 1900s in downtown Springfield. Two restaurant spaces occupy the street level with 40 offices on upper floors.

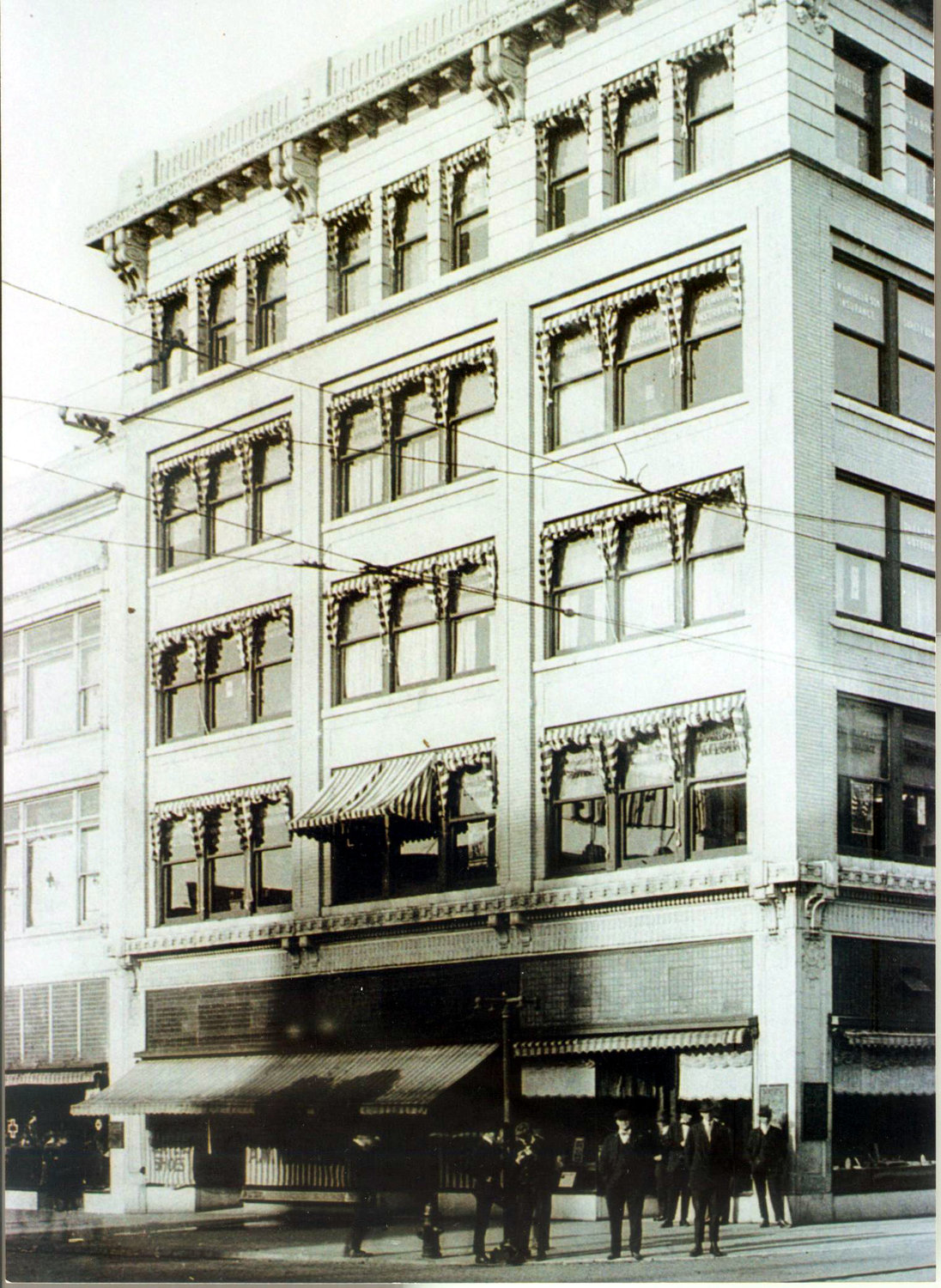
The Holland Building in 1918.

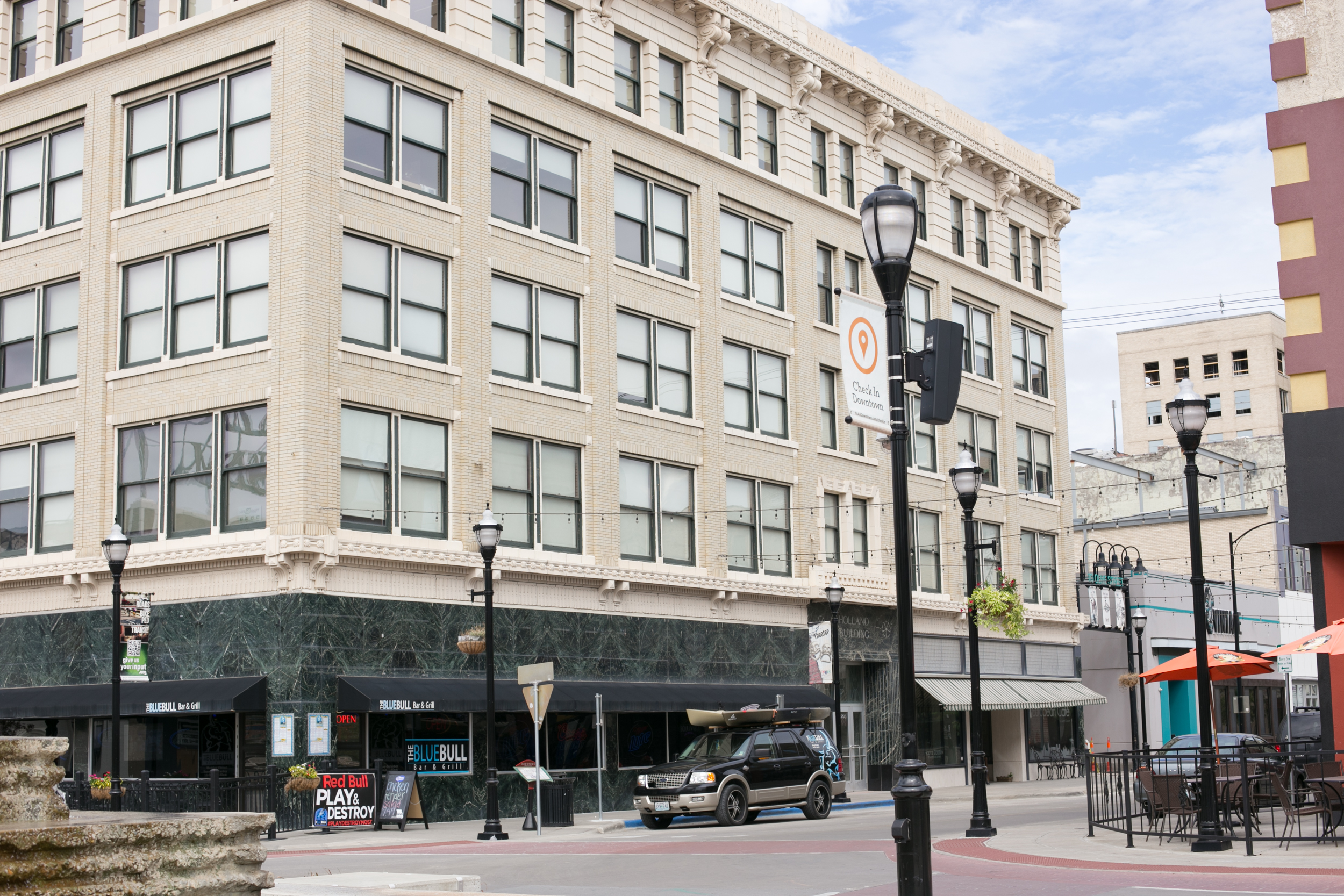
The Holland Building in 2014.

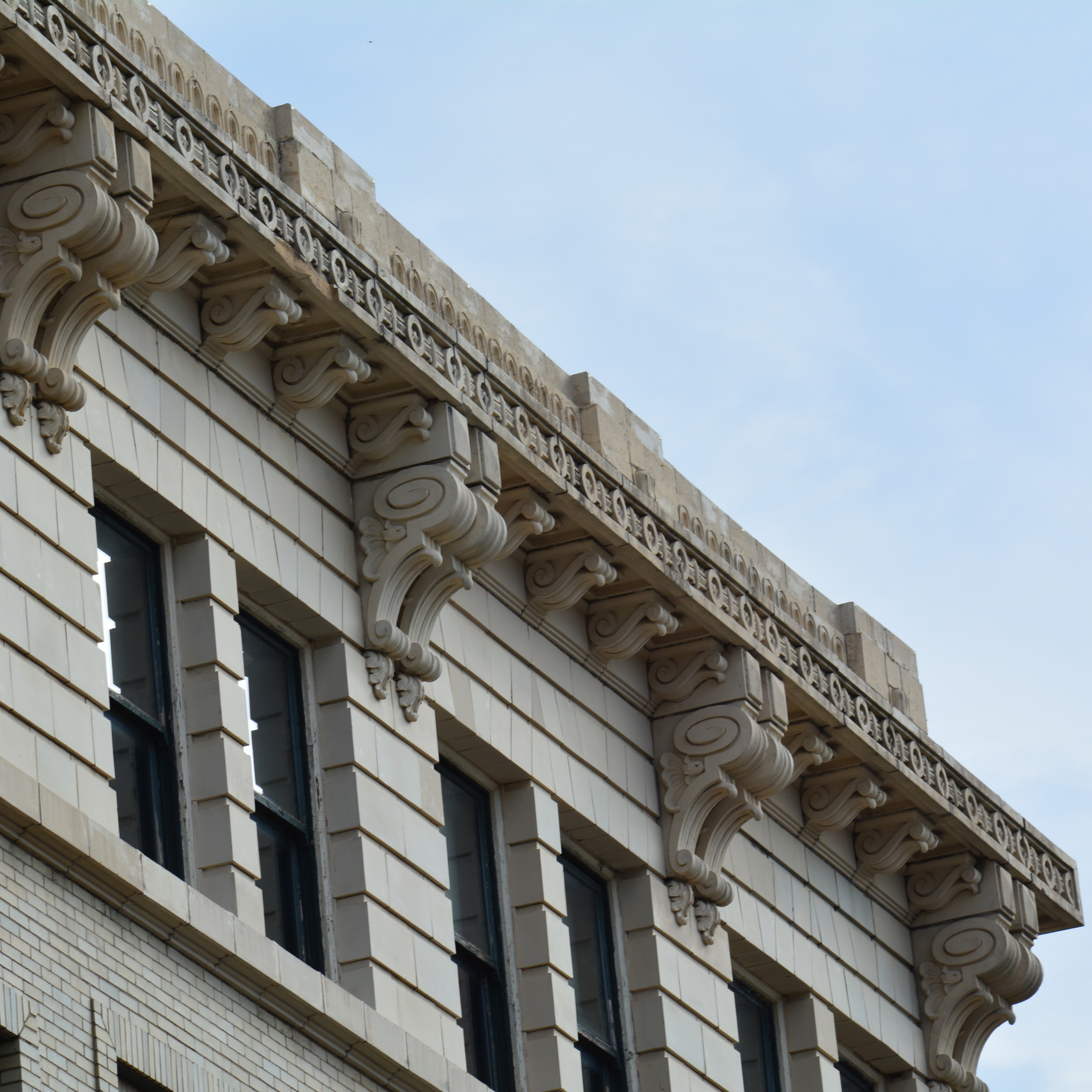
Cornice along the top of the Holland Building in Springfield, MO. (ca. 2025)

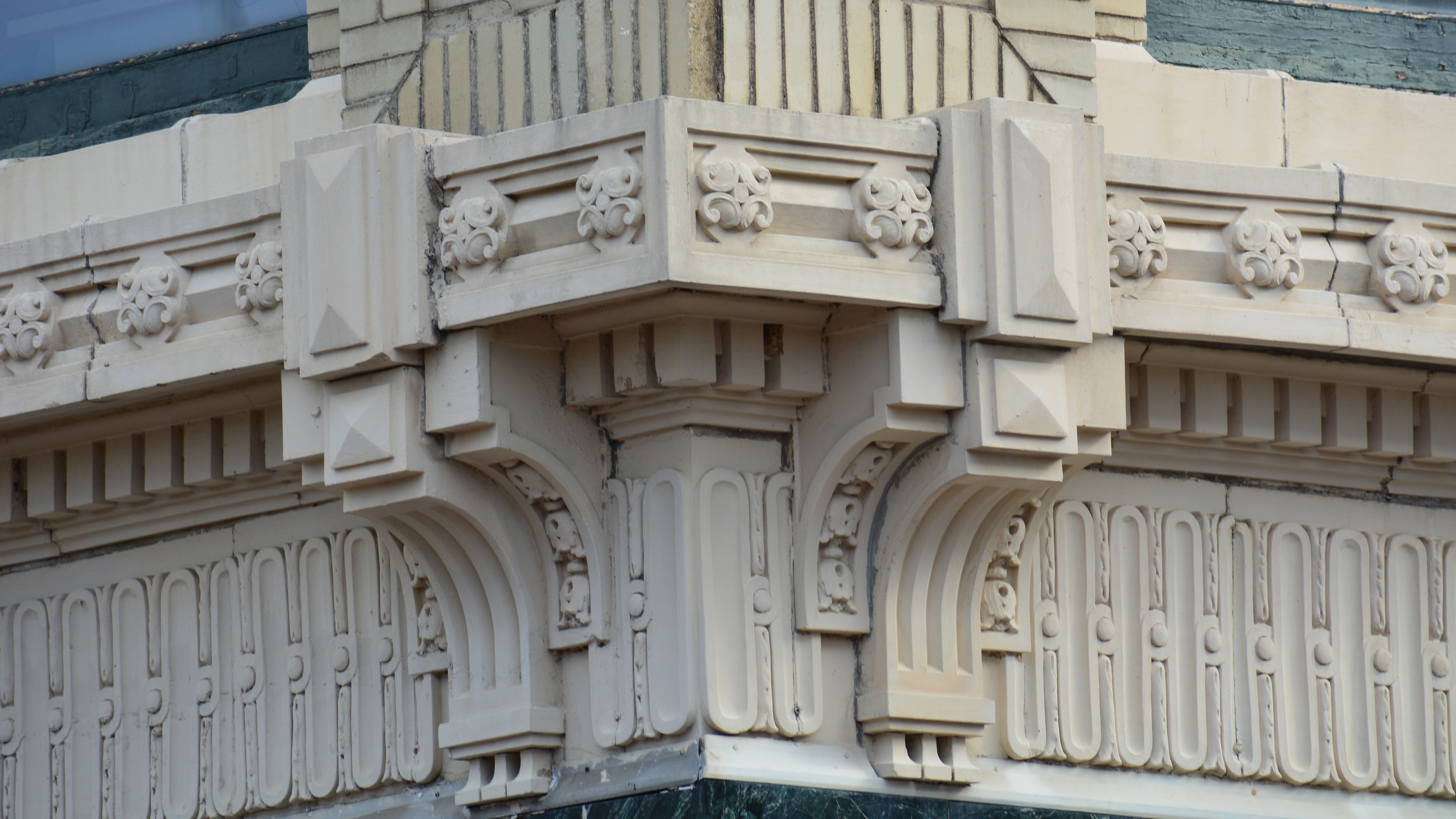
Preserved terracotta on the exterior of the Holland Building in Springfield, MO. (ca. 2025)

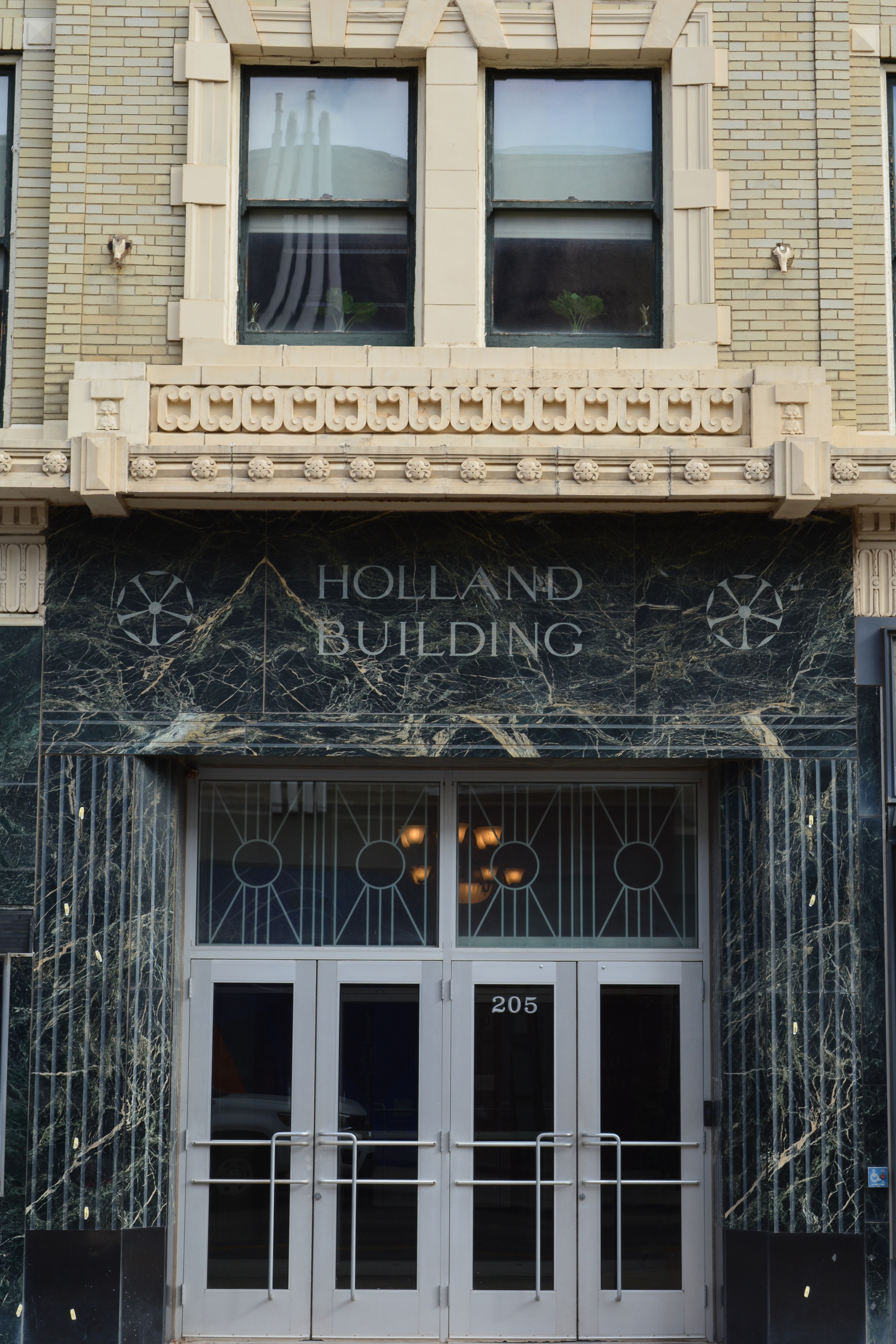
Southern entrance of the Holland Building in Springfield, MO. (ca. 2025)

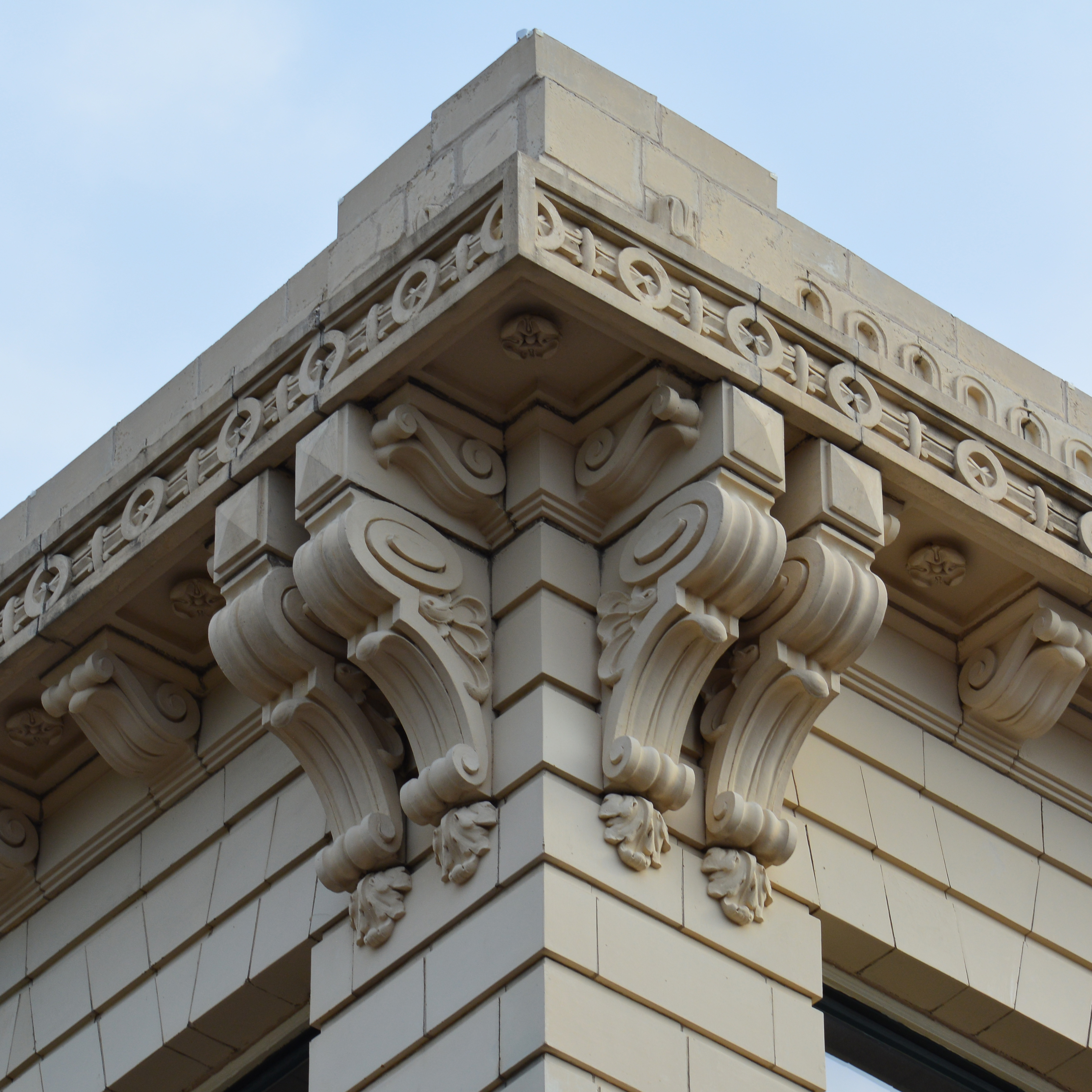
Corner cornice of the Holland Building in Springfield, MO. (ca. 2025)
