= College Apartments =

- U.S. National Register of Historic Places
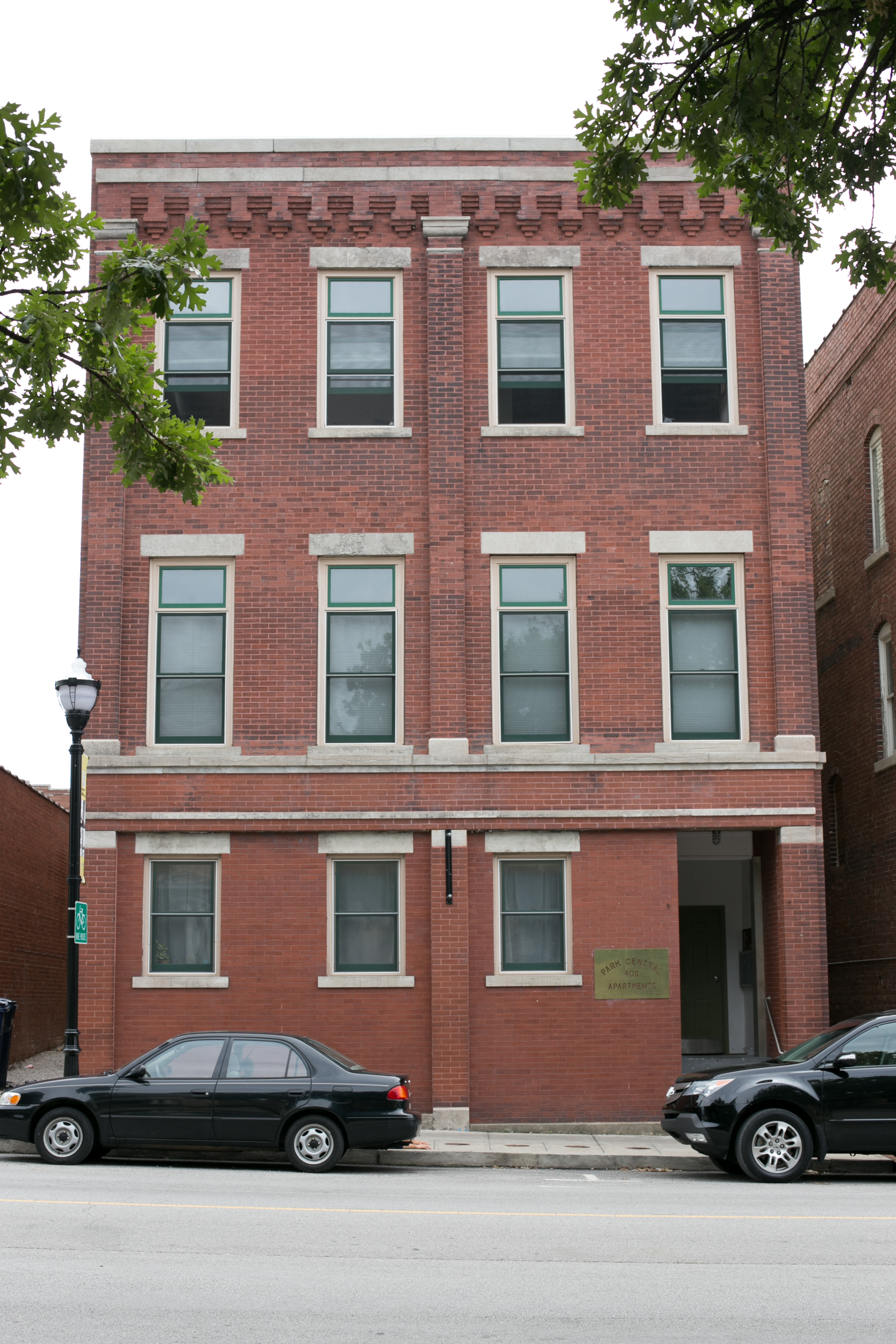
- College Apartments, September 2014

- Location within Missouri Location within the United States
- Location: 408 E. Walnut St., Springfield, Missouri
- Coordinates: 37°12′31″N 93°17′20″W
- Area: less than one acre
- Built: 1910, 1928
- Architectural style: Commercial Block Apartment
- MPS: Springfield MPS
- NRHP reference No.: 03000319
- Added to NRHP: May 1, 2003

College Apartments, also known as the Park Central Apartments, is a historic apartment building located at Springfield, Greene County, Missouri. It was originally constructed in 1910 as an expansion to Springfield Business College, and expanded and converted to apartments in 1928. It is a three-story, Commercial Block brick building with Classical details. The building features a flat parapet capped with flat limestone block and three brick pilasters with limestone capitals and plinths.

It was listed on the National Register of Historic Places in 2003.
