= Palace Hotel (Springfield, Missouri) =

- U.S. National Register of Historic Places
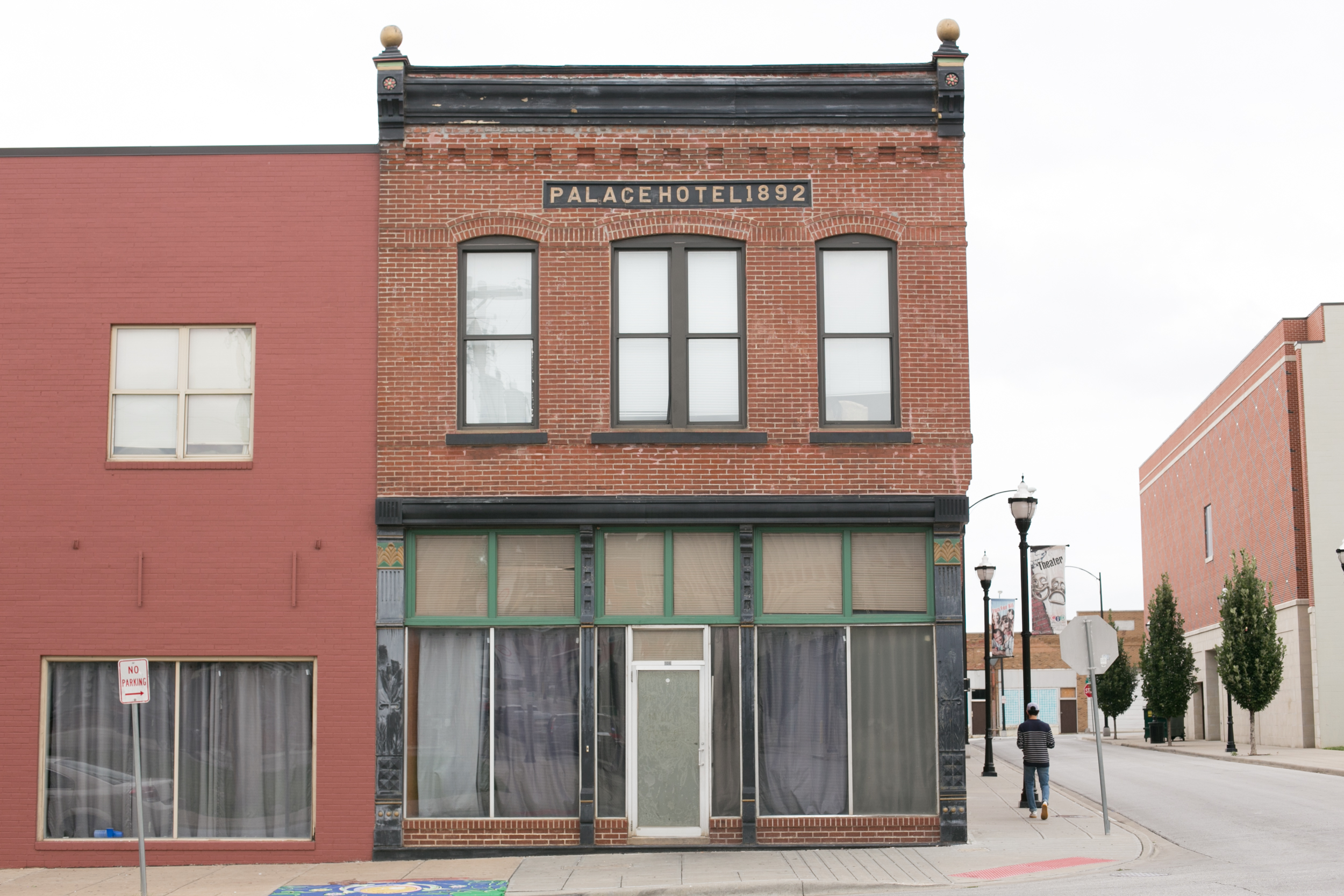
- The Palace Hotel, September 2014

- Location within Missouri Location within the United States
- Location: 501 College St., Springfield, Missouri
- Coordinates: 37°12′40″N 93°17′44″W
- Area: less than one acre
- Built: 1892, 1908
- Architectural style: Italianate, Commercial Block
- MPS: Springfield, Missouri MPS (Additional Documentation)
- NRHP reference No.: 02001419
- Added to NRHP: November 27, 2002

Palace Hotel, also known as the Eldredge Block, Excelsior Steam Laundry, Baltimore Hotel, Gardner Hotel, and Massey Hotel, is a historic hotel building located at Springfield, Greene County, Missouri. It was built about 1892, and is a two-story, Italianate influenced brick commercial building. It has cast iron columns on the first floor storefront, a flat roof, and flat parapet. It originally housed a laundry, then converted to a hotel in 1908. It continued as a hotel until 1946.

It was added to the National Register of Historic Places in 2002.
