= Finkbiner Building =

- U.S. National Register of Historic Places
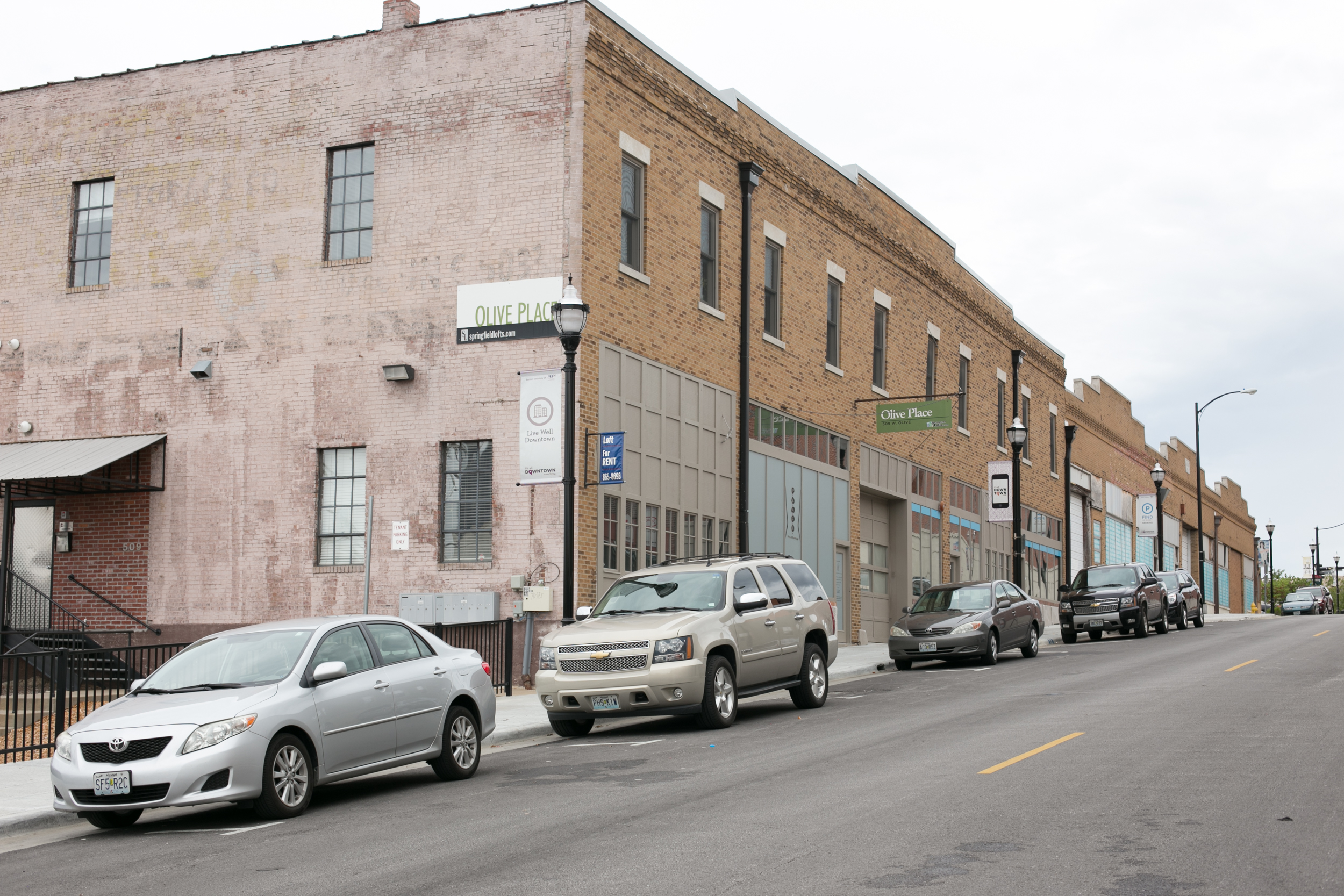
- Olive Place Lofts, September 2014

- Location within Missouri Location within the United States
- Location: 509-513 W. Olive St., Springfield, Missouri
- Coordinates: 37°12′43″N 93°17′46″W
- Area: less than one acre
- Built: c. 1925
- Architectural style: Commercial warehouse
- MPS: Springfield, Missouri MPS AD
- NRHP reference No.: 05000469
- Added to NRHP: May 25, 2005

Finkbiner Building, also known as Finkbiner Transfer and Storage Co. and Olive Place Lofts, is a historic warehouse building located at Springfield, Missouri, United States. Built about 1925, it is a large two story commercial warehouse, with load-bearing brick walls and a flat roof. It has a cubic form and a roughly wedge-shaped footprint.

It was listed on the National Register of Historic Places in 2005.
