= Rock Fountain Court Historic District =

Historic district in Missouri, United States

- U.S. National Register of Historic Places
- U.S. Historic district
- Location within Missouri Location within the United States
- Location: 2400 W. College St., Springfield, Missouri
- Coordinates: 37°12′31″N 93°19′30″W
- Area: less than one acre
- Built: 1945
- Built by: MacCandless, Mac; Waddell, Ed
- Architectural style: Ozark Rock Masonry
- NRHP reference No.: 03000179
- Added to NRHP: April 2, 2003

Rock Fountain Court Historic District, also known as Melinda Court, is a historic traveler's accommodation and national historic district located at Springfield, Greene County, Missouri. The district encompasses 10 contributing buildings and 1 contributing structure associated with a tourist court. The district developed between about 1945 and 1952, and includes 9 tourist cabins and a large frame garage. The cabins are of frame construction and faced in masonry ranging from all dark sandstone, to white limestone accented with red brick.

It was added to the National Register of Historic Places in 2003.
