= Heercleff =

Historic house in Missouri, US

- U.S. National Register of Historic Places
- Location within Missouri Location within the United States
- Location: 6405 S. Campbell Ave., Springfield, Missouri
- Coordinates: 37°05′55″N 93°17′52″W
- Area: 5.7 acres (2.3 ha)
- Built: 1921
- MPS: Springfield MPS
- NRHP reference No.: 16000763
- Added to NRHP: November 7, 2016

Heercleff, also known as Killarney Cliffs, is a historic home located at Springfield, Greene County, Missouri. The house was built in 1921, and is a three-story, dwelling with cobblestone walls and clipped gable roofs. Connected by an arched rock-walled breezeway is an ancillary two-story guesthouse with a large garage. Also on the property are contributing stone retaining walls and a large stairway to the river. It was built by Frances X. Heer, owner and manager of Heer's Department Store in Springfield.

It was listed on the National Register of Historic Places in 2016.
