= Rail Haven Motel =

- U.S. National Register of Historic Places
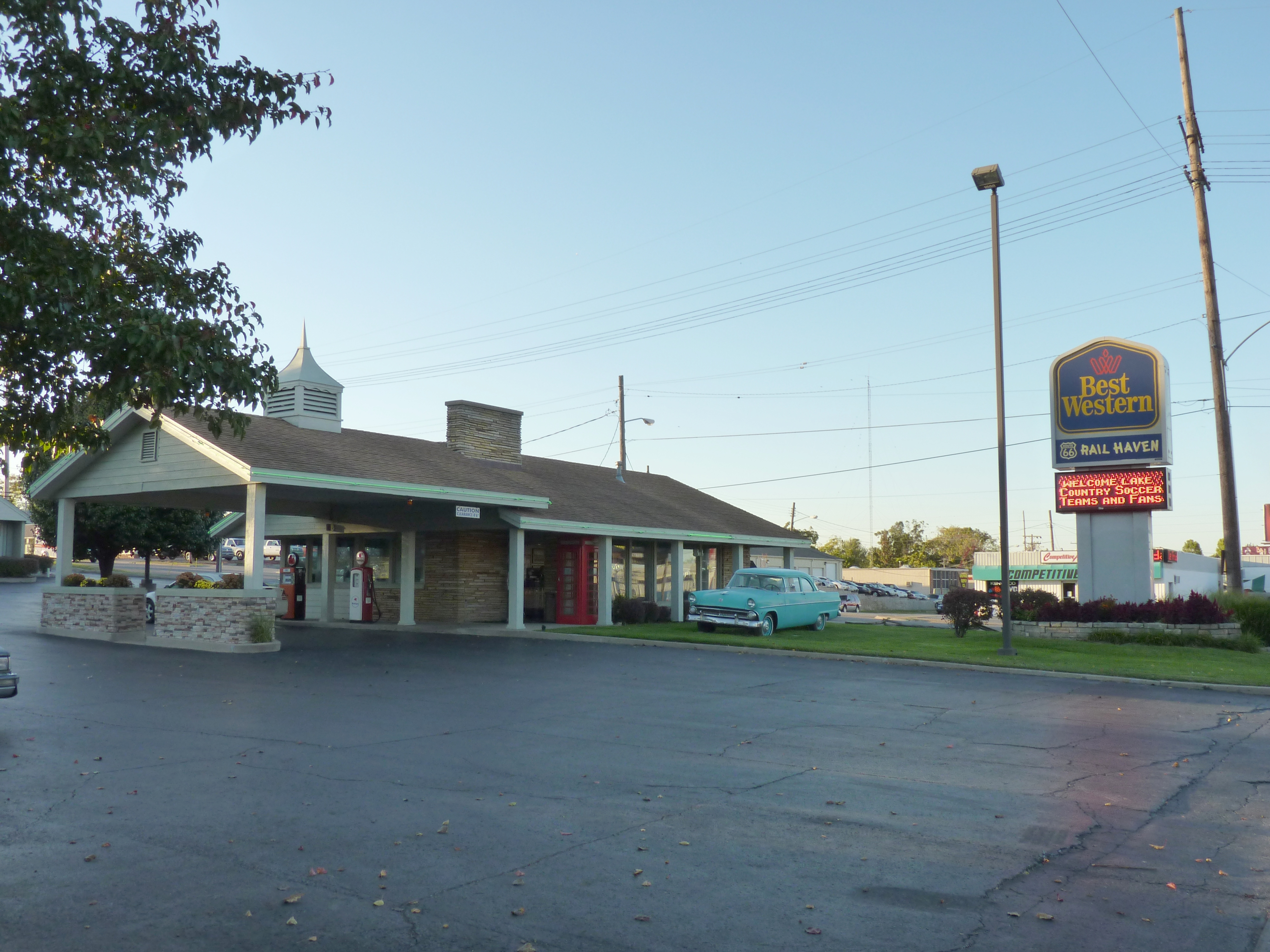
- Rail Haven Motel, October 2010

- Location within Missouri Location within the United States
- Location: 203 S, Glenstone Ave, Springfield, Missouri
- Coordinates: 37°12′39″N 93°15′44″W
- Area: 4.2 acres (1.7 ha)
- Built: 1938, c. 1957
- Architectural style: Late 19th And Early 20th Century American Movements
- MPS: Route 66 in Missouri MPS
- NRHP reference No.: 10000245
- Added to NRHP: May 10, 2010

Rail Haven Motel, also known as Rail Haven Motor Court, is a historic traveler's accommodation located at Springfield, Greene County, Missouri. It was built in 1938 and enlarged in 1957. It is an L-shaped motel complex that includes two Nine Unit Motel Buildings, Laundry, a 16 Unit Motel Building (1950), Original Laundry (1950), Office (1953), three Multiple Unit Motel Buildings (1938, c. 1957), the Thirty Unit Motel Building (1957), Swimming Pool and Pool House (1958), and Three Unit Motel Building (c. 1957).

It was added to the National Register of Historic Places in 2010. Today it operates as a Best Western franchise.
