= Keet-McElhany House =

Historic house in Missouri, United States

- U.S. National Register of Historic Places
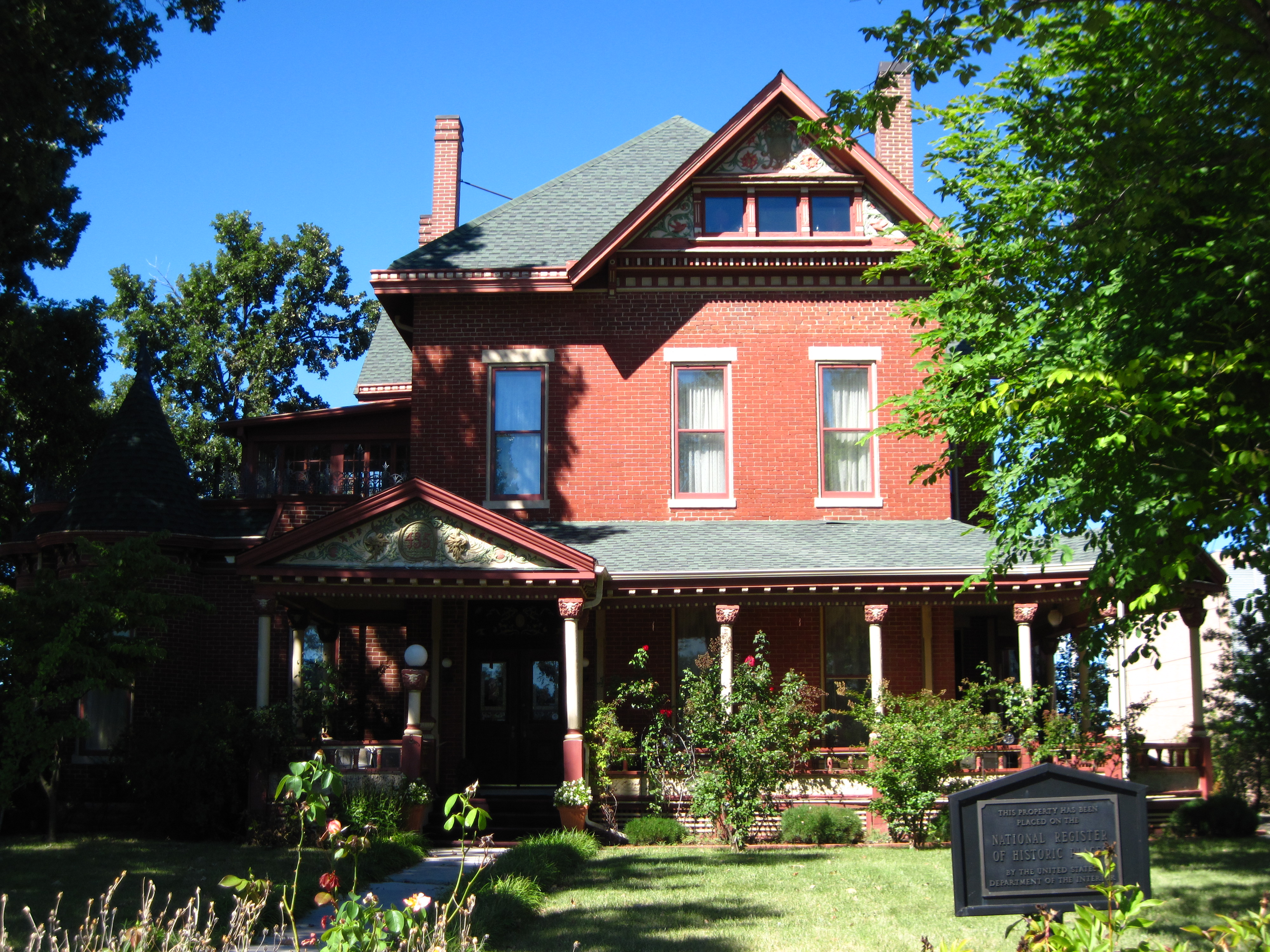
- Keet-McElhany House, September 2013

- Location within Missouri Location within the United States
- Location: 435 E. Walnut St., Springfield, Missouri
- Coordinates: 37°12′24″N 93°17′20″W
- Area: less than one acre
- Built: 1881, 1886, 1900
- Architectural style: Late Victorian
- NRHP reference No.: 84002545
- Added to NRHP: March 22, 1984

Keet-McElhany House is a historic home located at Springfield, Greene County, Missouri. It was built in 1881, and enlarged in 1886, and remodeled in 1900. It is a three-story, brick dwelling featuring two dormer bedrooms and a library on the third floor and reflects Italianate and Queen Anne style design elements. It features a multi-hipped and gable roof, porch with a projecting gable, and two round corner towers. It is ornamented with plaster work decorating exterior surfaces of the porch and gables. The stained glass inserts in the front French doors feature female figures in a Greek style, and opens onto a grand staircase leading to a sitting area on the second floor. The lower level features twelve-foot ceilings throughout, with ten-foot French doors leading into a formal front parlor adjacent to the formal dining room, which is lit by a large original bay window. The second floor has ten-foot ceilings in the front of the house, and a marble bathroom, as well as a secondary bathroom. Marble fireplaces adorn three of the sitting rooms on the first floor, and coordinating tile fireplaces in coral and teal grace the front parlor as well as a second floor anteroom attached to one of the two second floor bedrooms. The second upstairs bed has an attached sunroom overlooking the front corner of the lot. The kitchen features a butler’s pantry. There is a detached summer kitchen which has been converted into a guest house.

It was listed on the National Register of Historic Places in 1984.
