= Springfield Grocer Company Warehouse =

- U.S. National Register of Historic Places
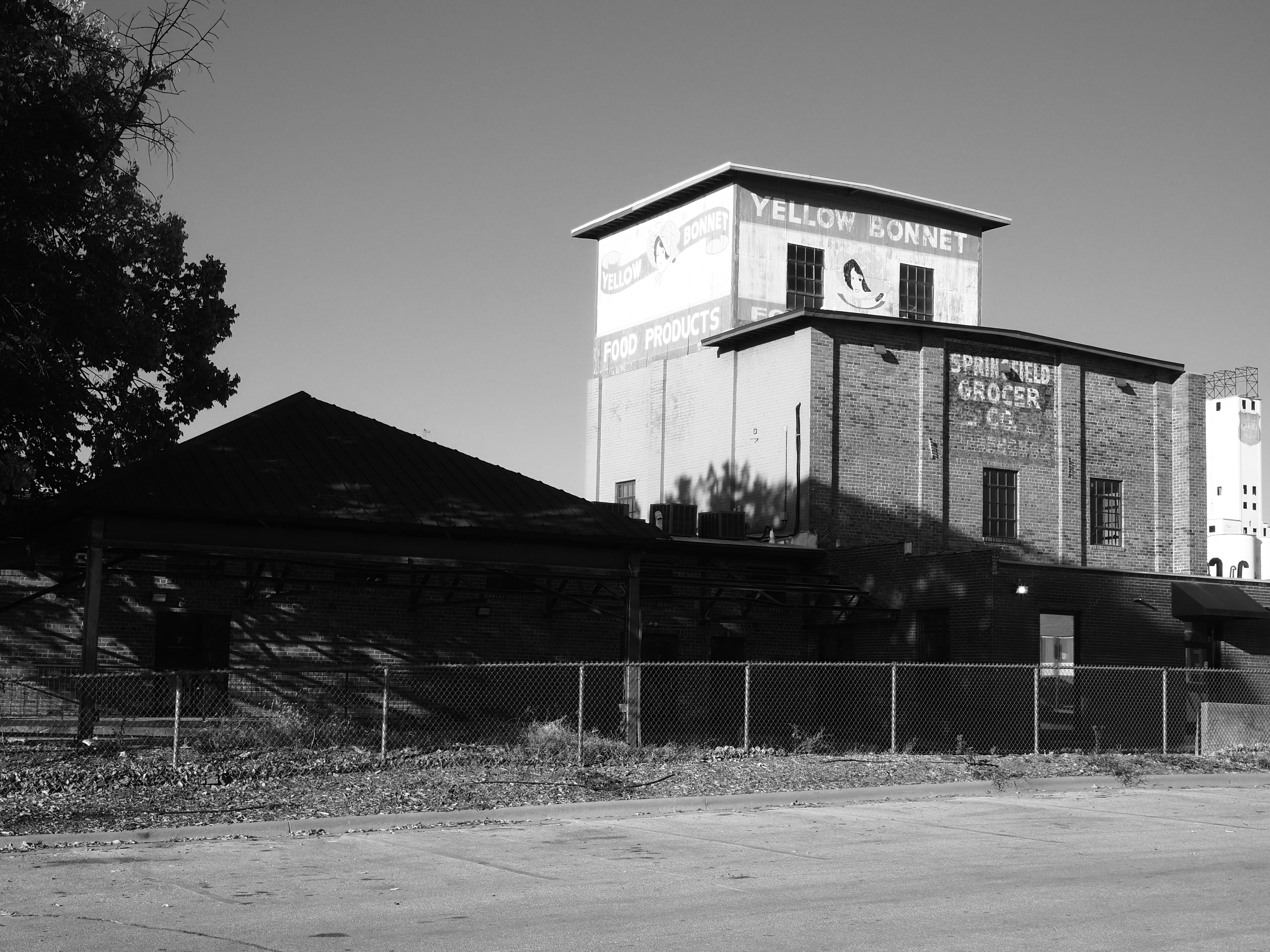

- Location within Missouri Location within the United States
- Location: 211-229 S. Market Ave., Springfield, Missouri
- Coordinates: 37°12′38″N 93°17′37″W
- Area: Less than 1 acre (0.40 ha)
- Built: c. 1925
- MPS: Springfield MPS
- NRHP reference No.: 10000462
- Added to NRHP: July 8, 2010

Springfield Grocer Company Warehouse, also known as the Holland-O'Neal Milling Company, is a historic warehouse building located at Springfield, Greene County, Missouri. It was built about 1925, and is a wide two story building with a four-story central tower. It measures approximately 185 feet by 40 feet and is tucked into a hillside. The building still bears wall signs added by the Springfield Grocer Company, including a distinctive set of signs advertising their private "Yellow Bonnet" brand of products.

It was listed on the National Register of Historic Places in 2010.
