= Old Calaboose =

- Old Calabosse
- U.S. National Register of Historic Places
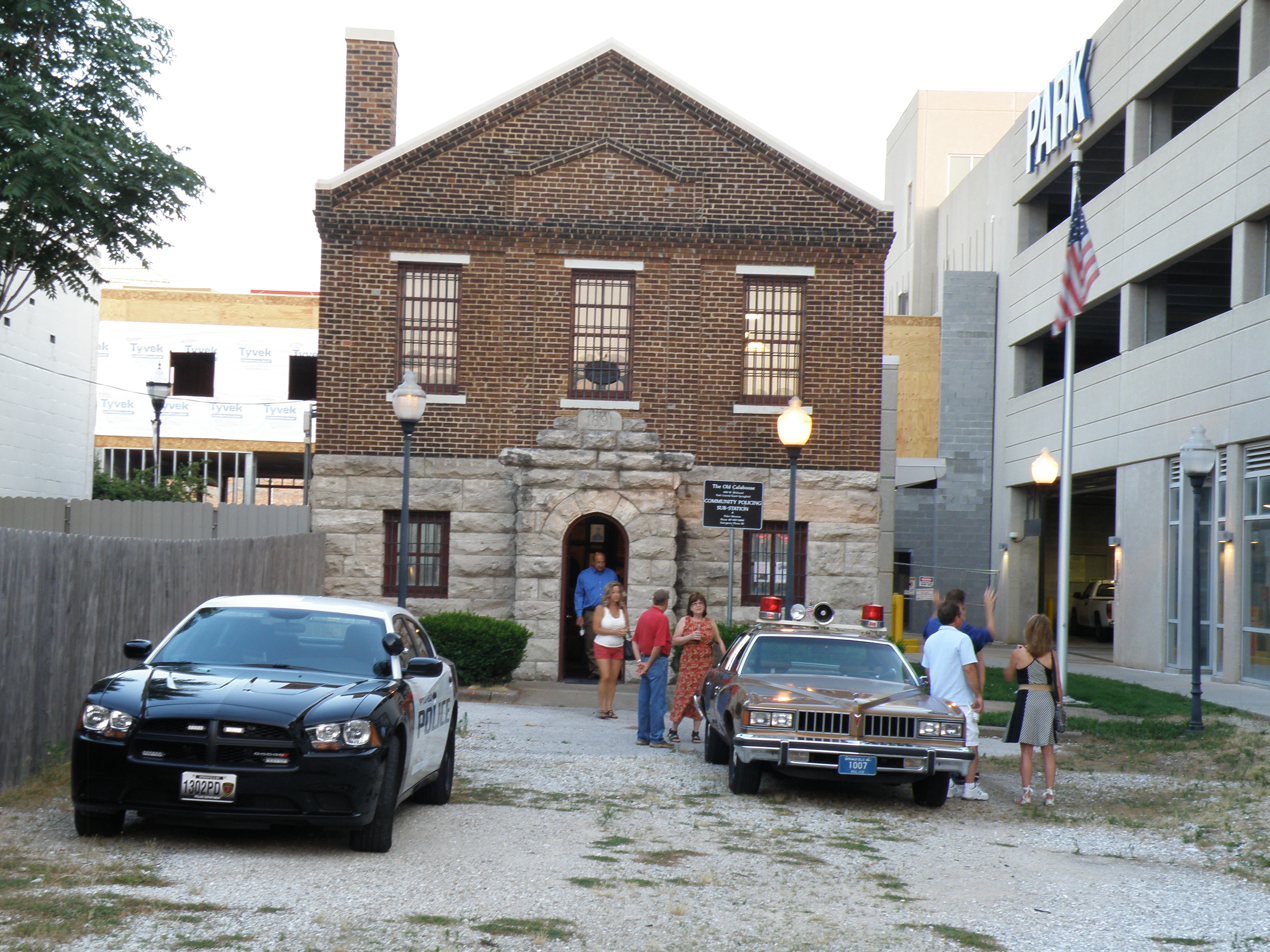
- Old Calaboose, July 2013

- Location within Missouri Location within the United States
- Location: 409 W. McDaniel St., Springfield, Missouri
- Coordinates: 37°12′30″N 93°17′40″W
- Area: 0.1 acres (0.040 ha)
- Built: 1891, 1921
- Architect: Skoog, Axel
- Architectural style: Palladian & Greek traditions
- NRHP reference No.: 80002355
- Added to NRHP: November 14, 1980

Old Calaboose, also known as Old Springfield City Jail and South Side Calaboose, is a historic jail located at Springfield, Greene County, Missouri. It was built in 1891, and is a two-story, brick and stone gable front building built in the Palladian and Greek traditions. It measures 26 feet by 26 feet. It was modified in 1921. The building is open to the public.

It was listed on the National Register of Historic Places in 1980.
