= Benton Avenue AME Church =

Historic church in Missouri, United States

- U.S. National Register of Historic Places
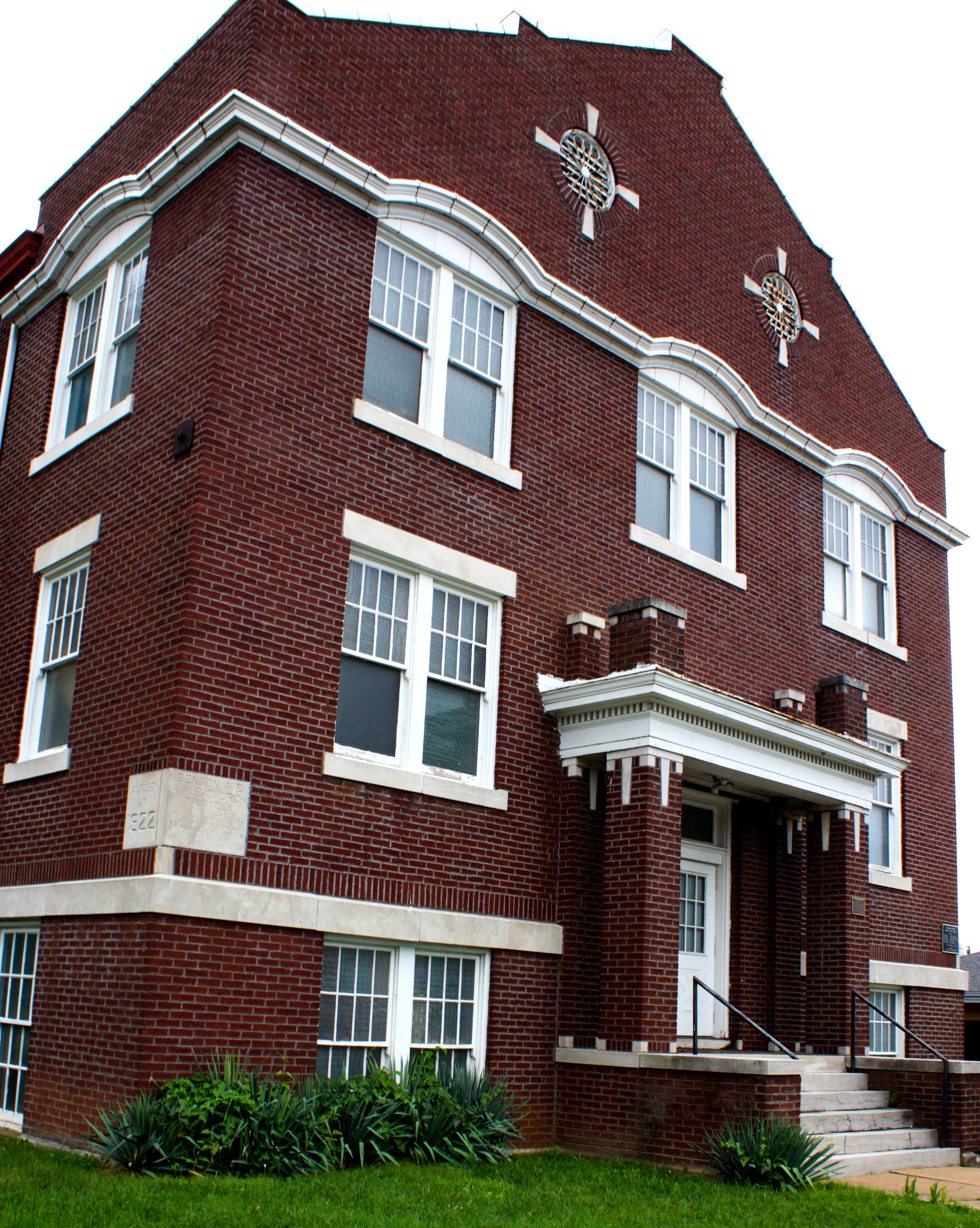

- Location within Missouri Location within the United States
- Location: 830 N. Benton Ave., Springfield, Missouri
- Coordinates: 37°13′2″N 93°17′14″W
- Area: less than one acre
- Built: 1922-1926
- NRHP reference No.: 01001109
- Added to NRHP: October 14, 2001

Benton Avenue AME Church is a historic African Methodist Episcopal church located at 830 N. Benton Avenue in Springfield, Greene County, Missouri, USA. It was built between 1922 and 1926, and is a two-story tile block and brick church.

It was listed on the National Register of Historic Places in 2001.
