= West Walnut Street Commercial Historic District =

Historic district in Missouri, United States

- U.S. National Register of Historic Places
- U.S. Historic district
- Location within Missouri Location within the United States
- Location: Roughly 400-300 blocks of W. Walnut St., 300-400 blocks of S. Campbell Ave., Springfield, Missouri
- Coordinates: 37°12′32″N 93°17′40″W
- Area: 2.6 acres (1.1 ha)
- Architectural style: Italianate, Commercial block
- MPS: Springfield MPS
- NRHP reference No.: 02000211
- Added to NRHP: March 20, 2002

West Walnut Street Commercial Historic District is a national historic district located in Springfield, Missouri, United States. The district encompasses 14 contributing buildings in a commercial section of Springfield. The district developed between about 1888 and 1951, and includes representative examples of Italianate commercial architecture. Notable buildings include the Diffenderffer Building (1906), the Koenigsbruk and Boehmer Building (c. 1888), and the Grand Hotel / Springfield Seed Co. Building (c. 1920).

It was added to the National Register of Historic Places in 2002.
