= D.M. Oberman Manufacturing Co. Building =

- U.S. National Register of Historic Places
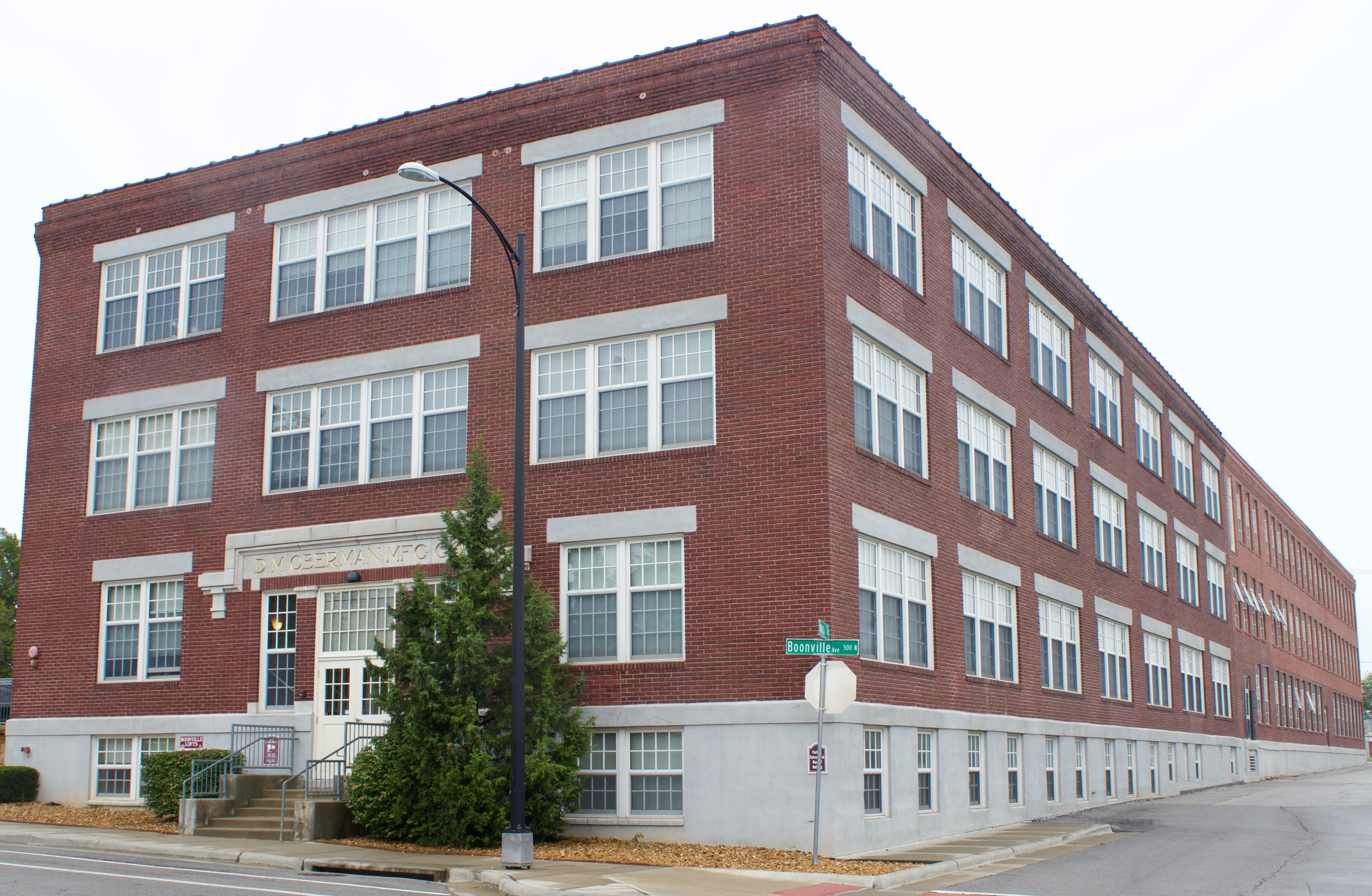

- Location within Missouri Location within the United States
- Location: 600 N. Boonville Ave., Springfield, Missouri
- Coordinates: 37°12′58″N 93°17′31″W
- Area: less than one acre
- Built: 1917, 1925
- Architect: Heckenlively, James Luther
- Architectural style: Factory
- NRHP reference No.: 02000379
- Added to NRHP: April 18, 2002

D.M. Oberman Manufacturing Co. Building, also known as the Oberman and Company Building, is a historic building located at Springfield, Greene County, Missouri. It was built in 1917, and expanded through 1925. It is a three-story, rectangular brick building on a concrete foundation, built in the Daylight Factory style. It has a flat roof with corbelled brick cornice and flat parapet.

The building housed a garment factory and closed in 1949.

It was listed on the National Register of Historic Places in 2002.
