= Springfield Seed Co. Office and Warehouse =

- U.S. National Register of Historic Places
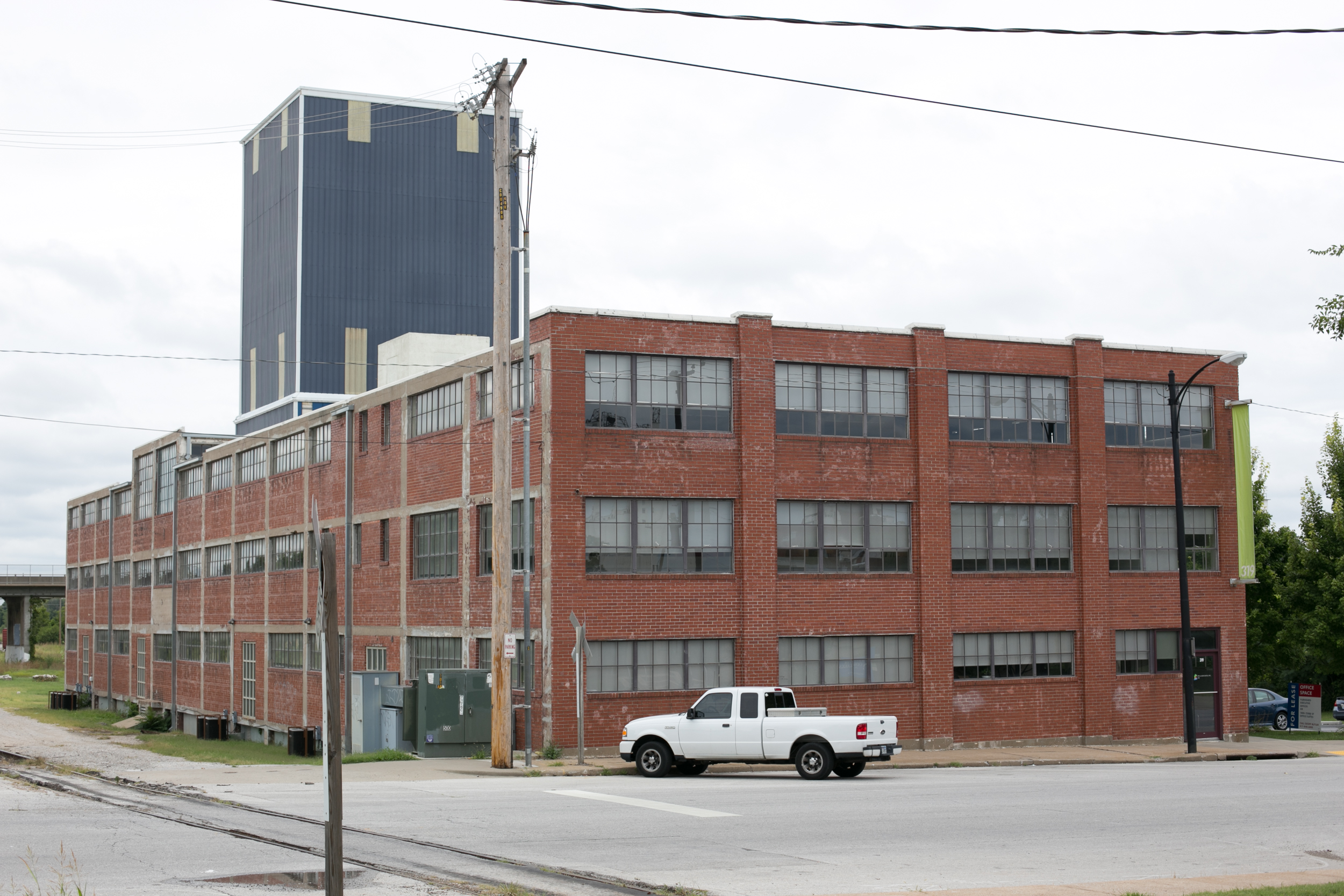
- Springfield Seed Co. Office and Warehouse, September 2014

- Location within Missouri Location within the United States
- Location: 319 N. Main Ave., Springfield, Missouri
- Coordinates: 37°12′44″N 93°17′49″W
- Area: less than one acre
- Built: c. 1936
- MPS: Springfield MPS
- NRHP reference No.: 06000863
- Added to NRHP: September 14, 2006

Springfield Seed Co. Office and Warehouse is a historic warehouse building located at Springfield, Missouri, United States. Built about 1936, it is a three-story, rectangular steel-reinforced concrete and brick commercial building. It features continuous bays of multiple-paned steel hopper-sash windows.

It was listed on the National Register of Historic Places in 2006.
