= Pearl Apartments and Windsor Apartments =

- U.S. National Register of Historic Places
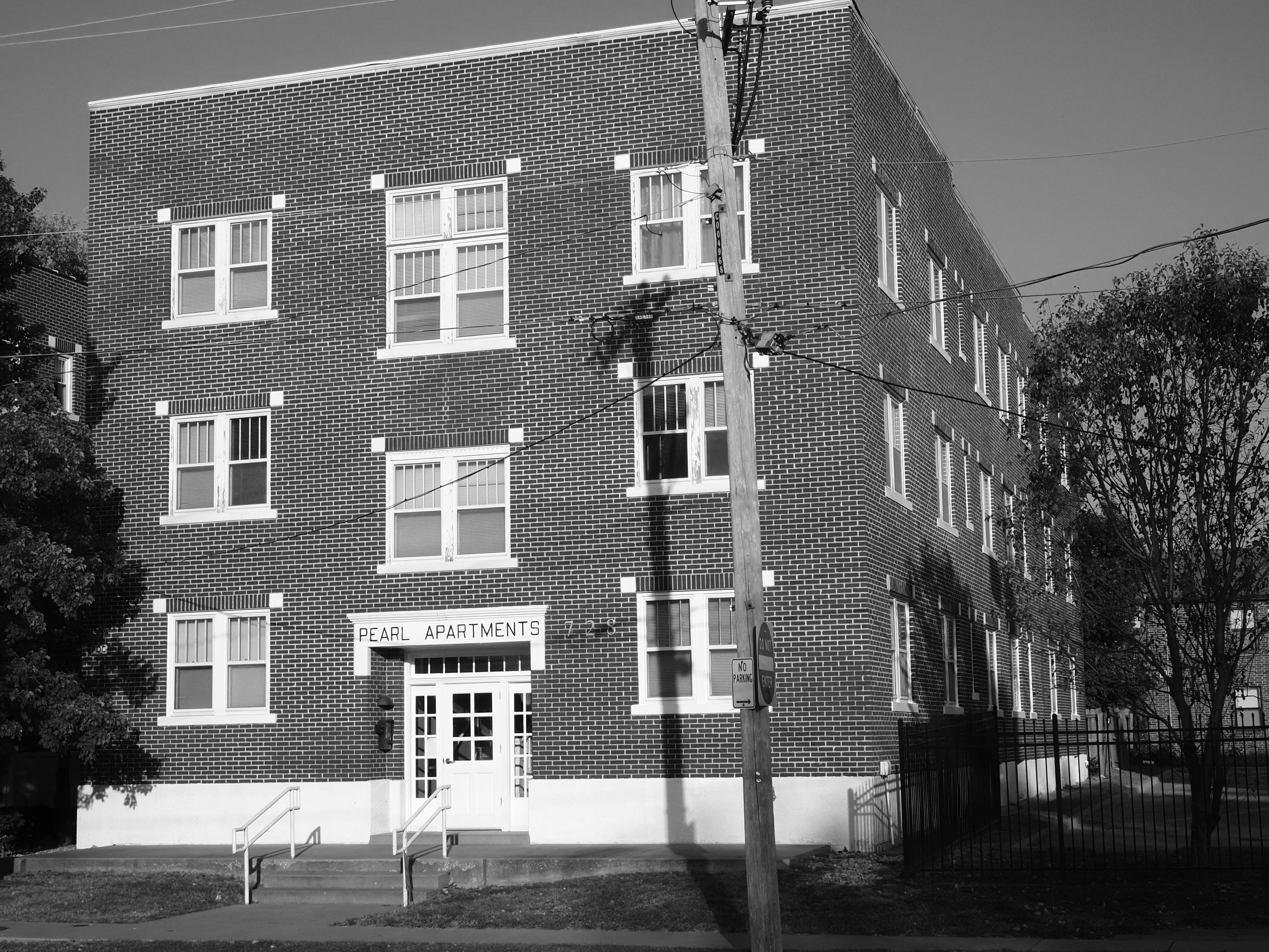
- Pearl Apartment Building in 2024

- Location within Missouri Location within the United States
- Location: 728 and 722 S. Jefferson St., Springfield, Missouri
- Coordinates: 37°12′7″N 93°17′21″W
- Area: less than one acre
- Built: 1926, 1937
- Built by: Hickman, O
- MPS: Springfield MPS
- NRHP reference No.: 05001376
- Added to NRHP: December 6, 2005

Pearl Apartments and Windsor Apartments are two historic apartment buildings located at Springfield, Greene County, Missouri. The Pearl Apartments were built in 1926, and the Windsor Apartments in 1937. They are almost identical and are three-story, Commercial Block buildings of wood-frame construction with a brick exterior. They have an unadorned brick facade consisting of three bays of paired window openings with limestone quoins and sills.

It was listed on the National Register of Historic Places in 2004.
