= Wise Feed Company Building =

- U.S. National Register of Historic Places
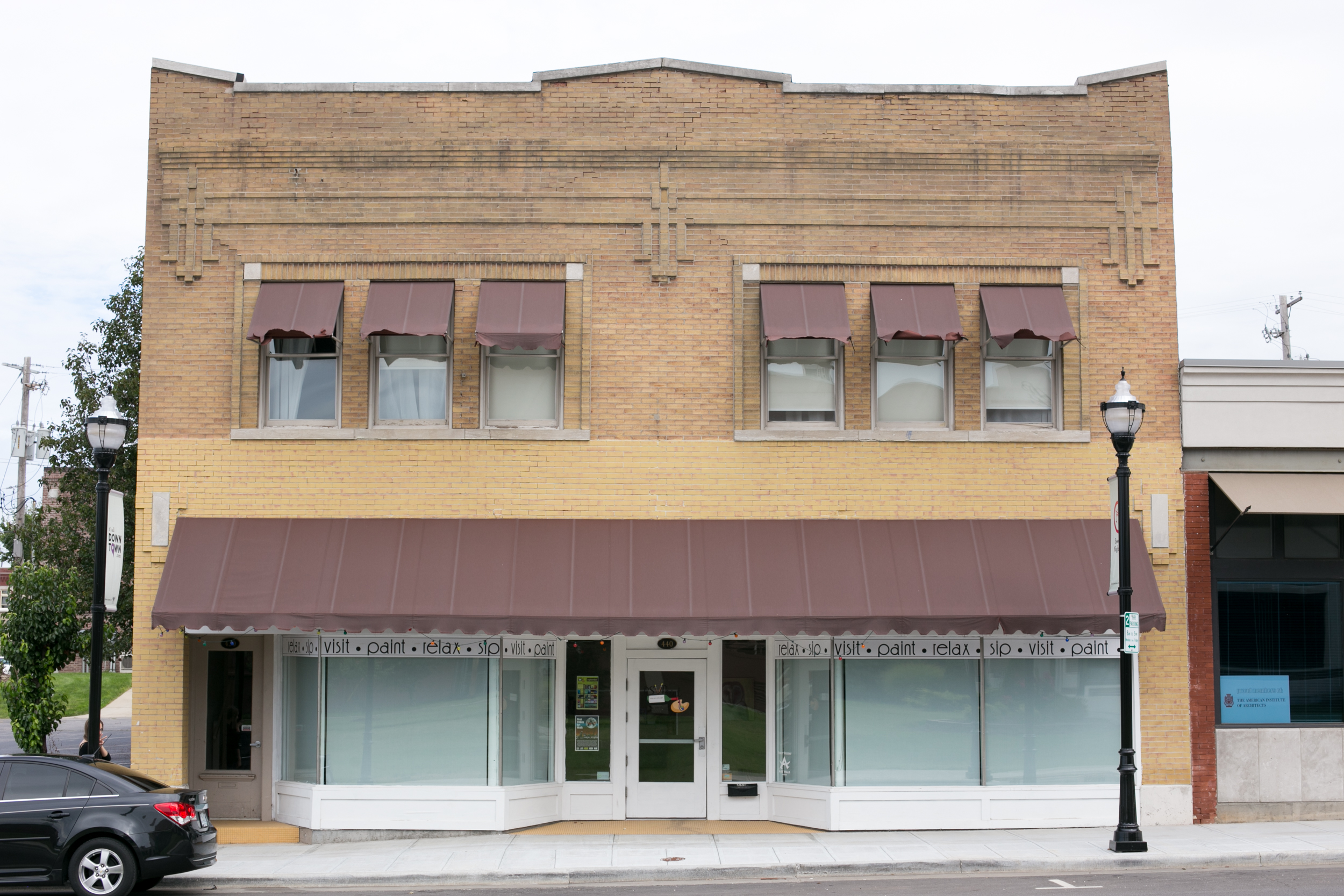
- Wise Feed Company Building, September 2014

- Location within Missouri Location within the United States
- Location: 438-440 S. Campbell Ave., Springfield, Missouri
- Coordinates: 37°12′20″N 93°17′34″W
- Area: less than one acre
- Built: c. 1930
- Architectural style: Early Commercial, Brick front commercial block
- MPS: Springfield MPS
- NRHP reference No.: 02001685
- Added to NRHP: January 6, 2003

Wise Feed Company Building, also known as the Motor Mart Garage Building, is a historic commercial building located at Springfield, Greene County, Missouri. It was built about 1930, and is a two-story, rectangular tan brick commercial building. It has a flat roof and rests on a concrete foundation. It features decorative brickwork on the front facade.

It was listed on the National Register of Historic Places in 2002.
