= Gottfried Furniture Company Building =

- U.S. National Register of Historic Places
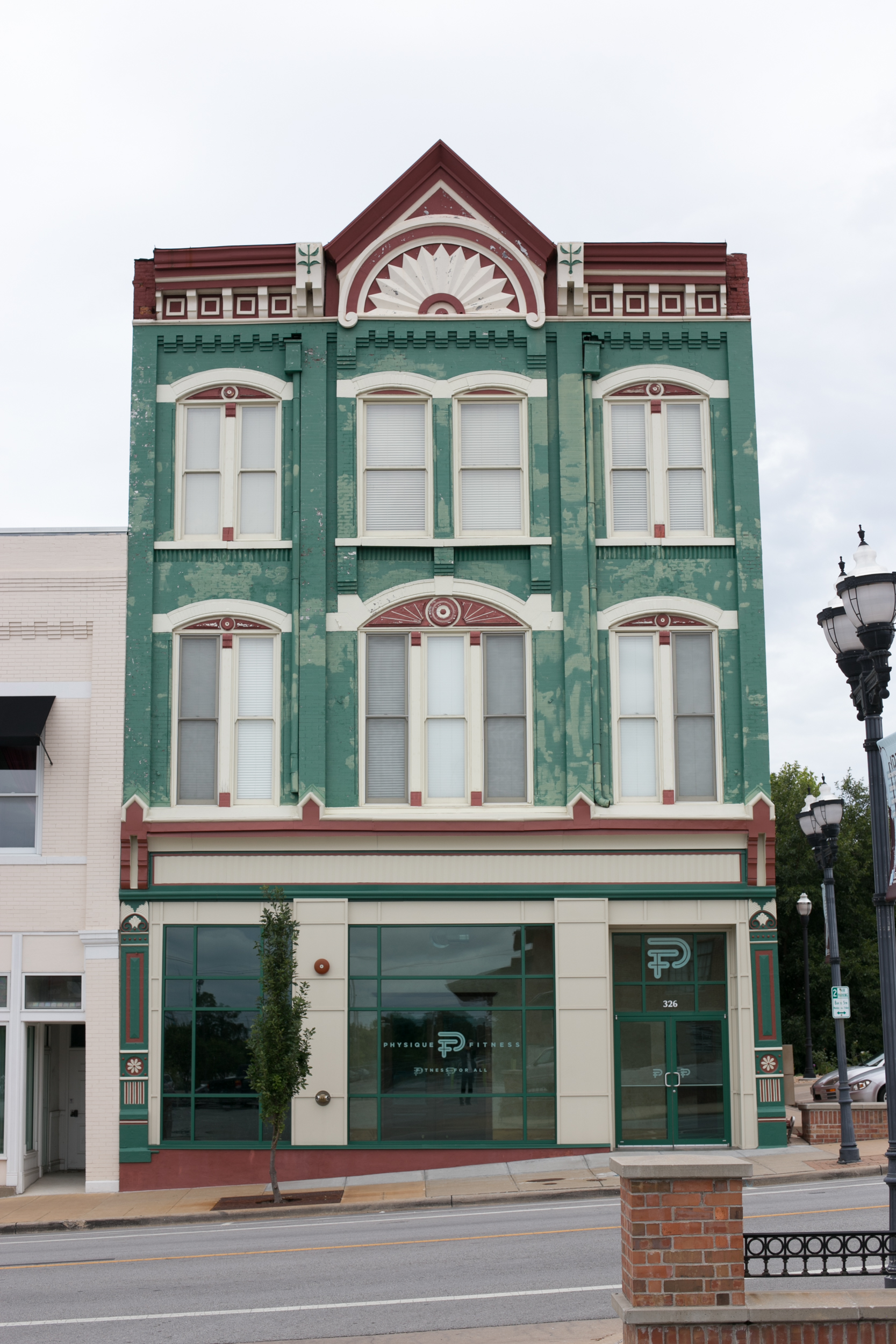
- Gottfried Furniture Company Building, September 2014

- Location within Missouri Location within the United States
- Location: 326 Boonville Ave., Springfield, Missouri
- Coordinates: 37°12′45″N 93°17′31″W
- Area: less than one acre
- Built: 1890
- Architectural style: Late Victorian, Two-part commercial block
- MPS: Springfield MPS
- NRHP reference No.: 07001289
- Added to NRHP: December 18, 2007

The Gottfried Furniture Company Building is a historic commercial building located in Springfield, Missouri, United States. Built around 1890, it is a three-story, rectangular, Late Victorian-style red-painted brick commercial building. It features a lavish presentation of metal ornamentation and corbeled brick at the roofline, upper-story windows and storefront.

It was listed on the National Register of Historic Places in 2007.
