= Camp Manor Apartments =

Historic building in Missouri, US

- U.S. National Register of Historic Places
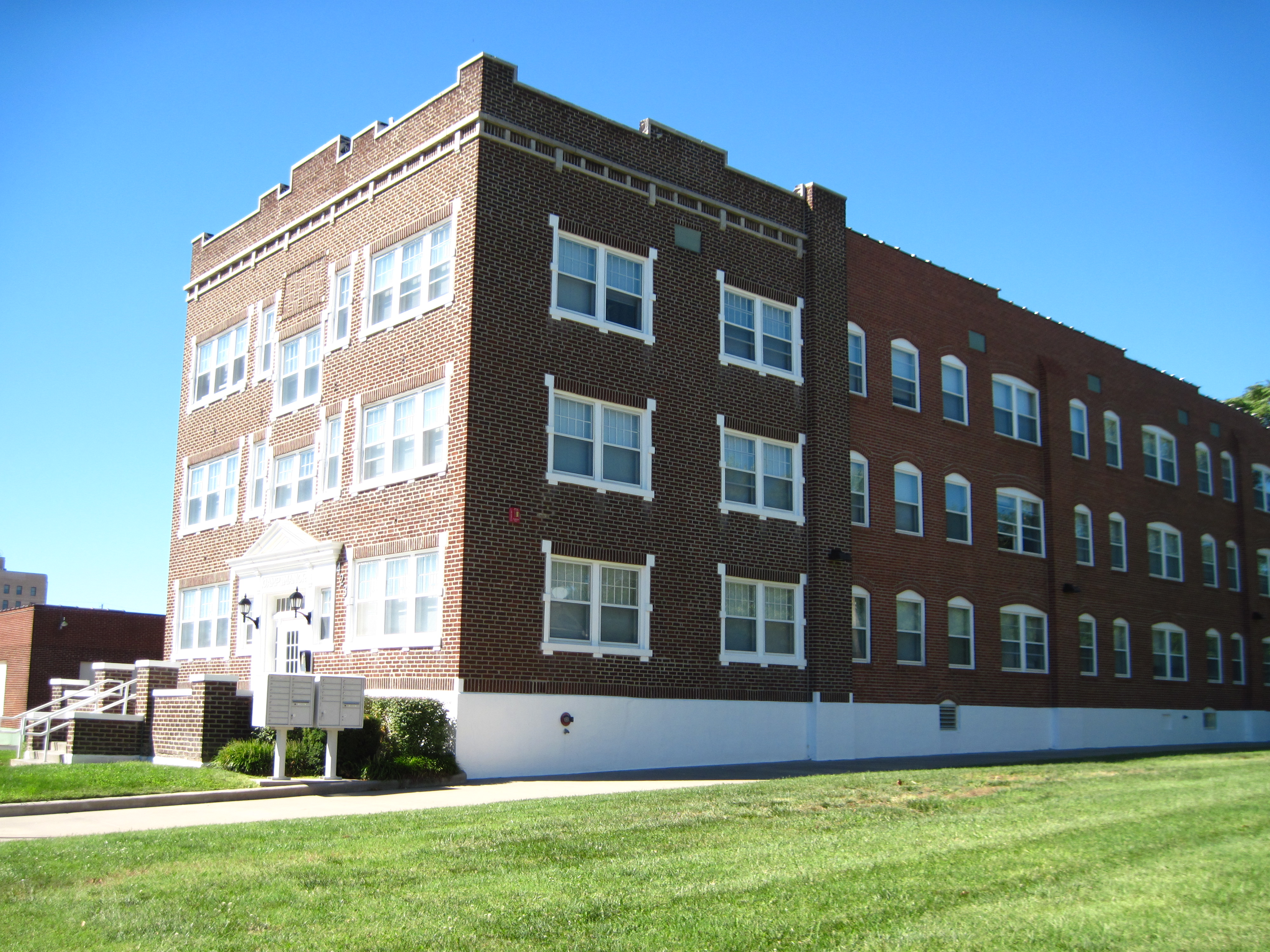
- Camp Manor Apartments, September 2013

- Location within Missouri Location within the United States
- Location: 423 E. Elm St., Springfield, Missouri
- Coordinates: 37°12′18″N 93°17′21″W
- Area: less than one acre
- Built: 1916
- Architect: Camp, Ralph
- MPS: Springfield MPS
- NRHP reference No.: 05001374
- Added to NRHP: December 6, 2005

Camp Manor Apartments is a historic apartment building located in Springfield, Greene County, Missouri. It was built in 1916, and is a three-story building of wood-frame construction with a red brick and wood exterior. The building features a stepped parapet with limestone cap and ornate limestone brick cornice at the roofline.

It was listed on the National Register of Historic Places in 2005.
