= Henry Schneider Building =

- U.S. National Register of Historic Places
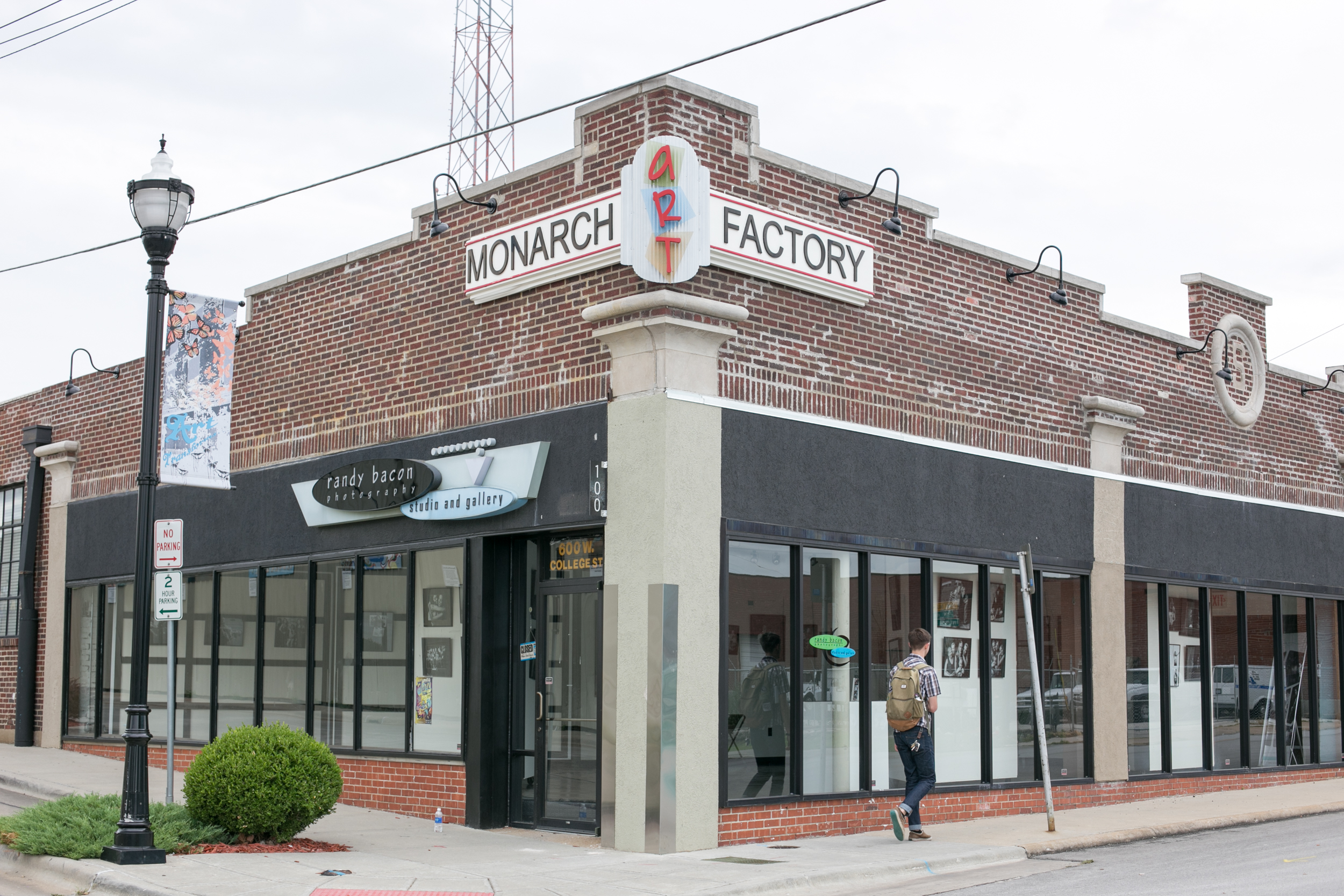
- Monarch Art Factory, September 2014

- Location within Missouri Location within the United States
- Location: 600 College St.--219-231 S. Main Ave., Springfield, Missouri
- Coordinates: 37°12′38″N 93°17′50″W
- Area: less than one acre
- Built: c. 1928, 1952
- Architectural style: Garage
- MPS: Springfield MPS
- NRHP reference No.: 06000535
- Added to NRHP: August 24, 2006

Henry Schneider Building, also known as the Monarch Machine Co., Main Street Garage, Cities Service Co. Station, and Herrick & Edwards Tires, is a historic commercial building located at Springfield, Greene County, Missouri. It was built about 1928, and remodeled to its present form in 1952. It is a one-story, brick commercial building with a flat roof and concrete foundation. The building housed multiple automobile related businesses from the time it was constructed into modern times.

It was listed on the National Register of Historic Places in 2006.
