= Producers Produce Company Plant =

- U.S. National Register of Historic Places
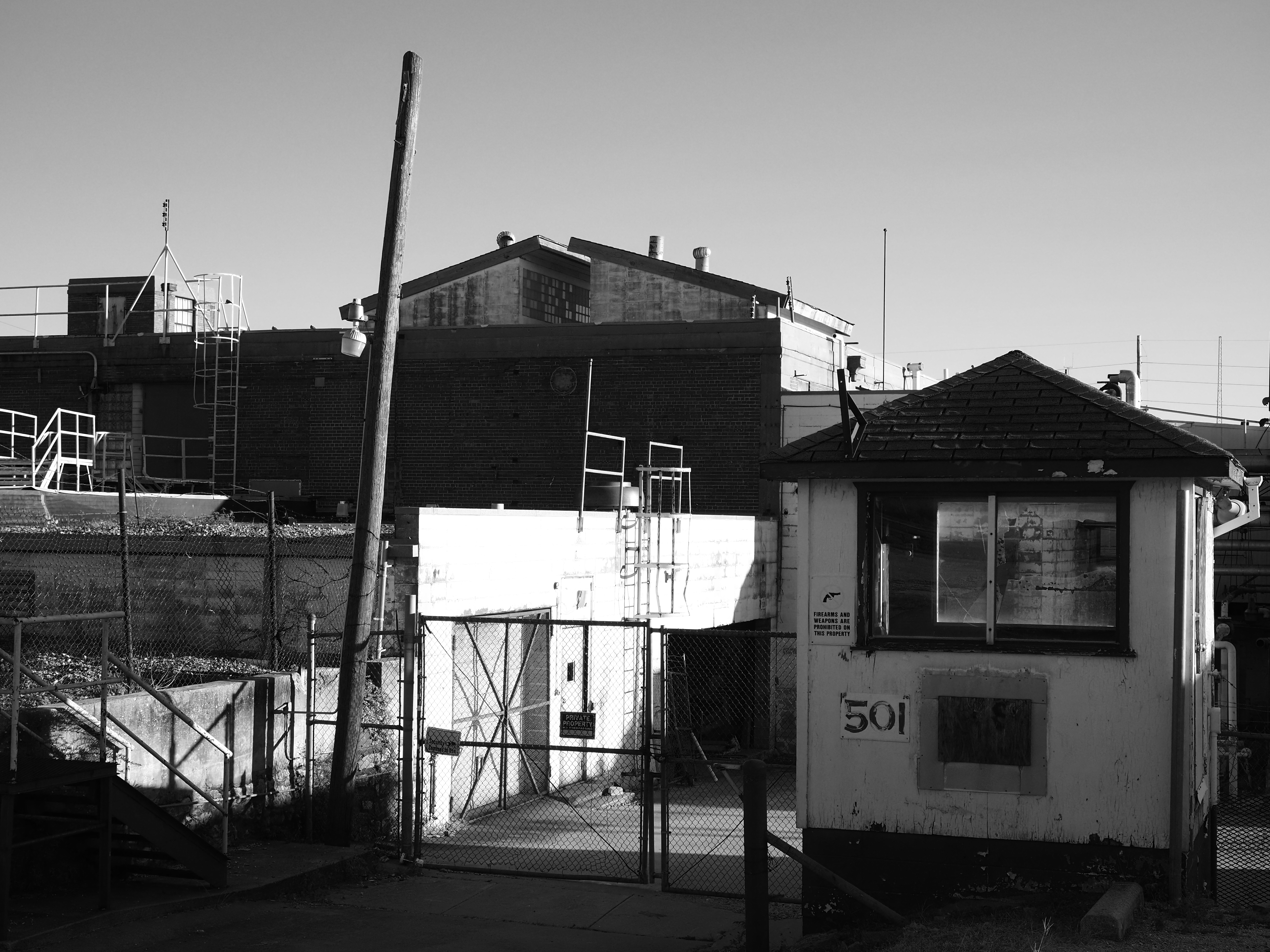

- Location within Missouri Location within the United States
- Location: 501 N. Main Ave., Springfield, Missouri
- Coordinates: 37°07′26″N 93°28′49″W
- Area: 5.5 acres (2.2 ha)
- Built: 1920, 1935, 1943, 1946, 1947, 1951
- Architectural style: Factory
- MPS: Springfield MPS
- NRHP reference No.: 10000181
- Added to NRHP: April 12, 2010

Producers Produce Company Plant is a historic manufacturing complex located at Springfield, Greene County, Missouri. The original sections were built about 1920, and expanded through 1980. The complex consists of nine two- and three-story red brick buildings that housed a wholesale poultry packing and egg factory. They include the Poultry Storage building, Office and Packing Plant, Egg Preparation Department, Egg Drying Building, Packing Plant, two Cold Storage Buildings, Engine Room, and Freight Station.

It was listed on the National Register of Historic Places in 2010.
