= Fallin Brothers Building =

- U.S. National Register of Historic Places
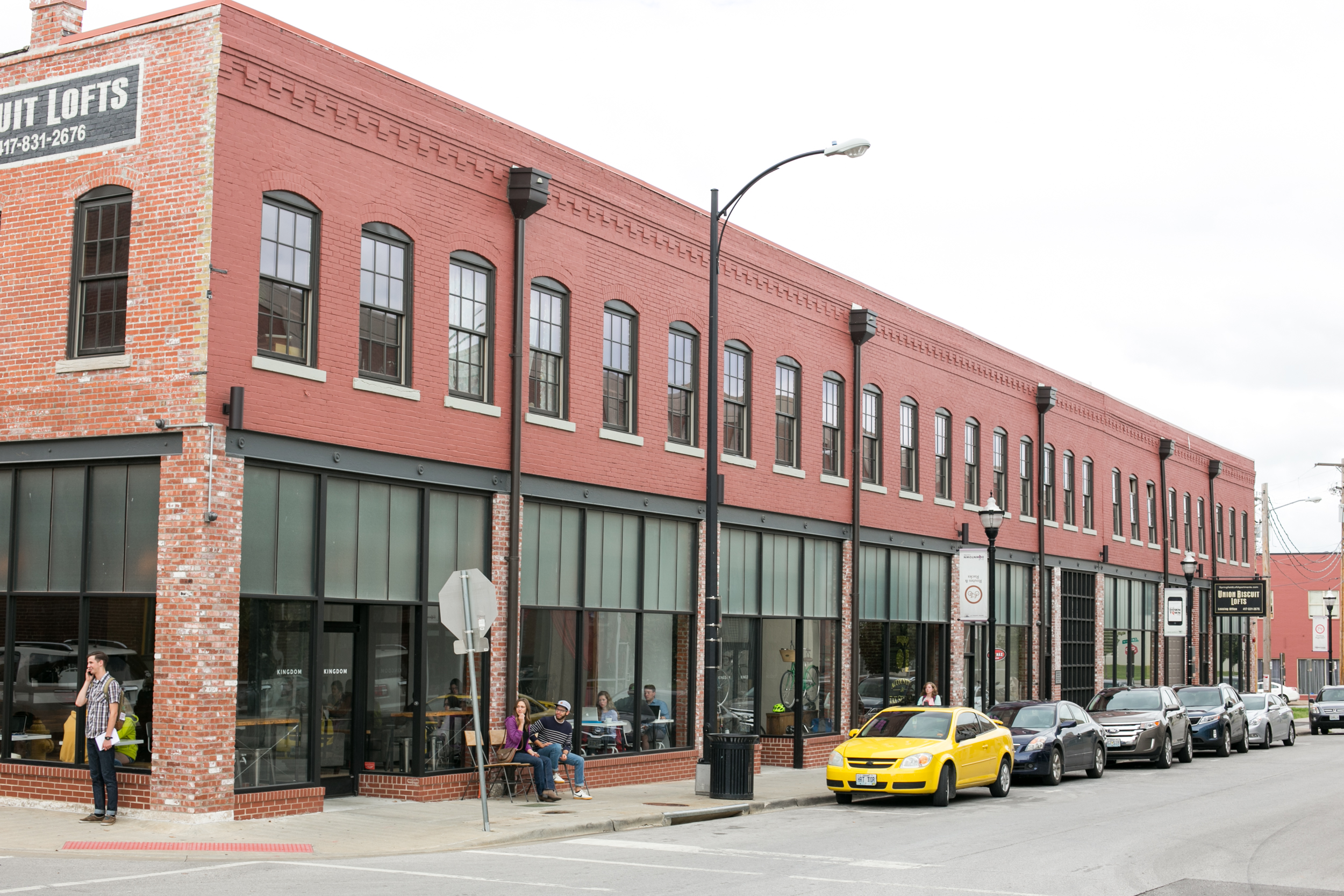
- Fallin Brothers Building, September 2014

- Location within Missouri Location within the United States
- Location: 211-229 S. Market Ave., Springfield, Missouri
- Coordinates: 37°12′30″N 93°17′44″W
- Area: Less than 1 acre (0.40 ha)
- Built: c. 1919
- Architectural style: Two-part commercial block
- MPS: Springfield MPS
- NRHP reference No.: 12000435
- Added to NRHP: July 25, 2012

Fallin Brothers Building is a historic commercial building located at Springfield, Greene County, Missouri. It was built about 1919, and is a large two-story, brick building on a concrete foundation. It has open storefronts and large garage doors on the ground floor and a corbelled brick cornice.

It was listed on the National Register of Historic Places in 2012.
