= J.E. King Manufacturing Company =

- U.S. National Register of Historic Places
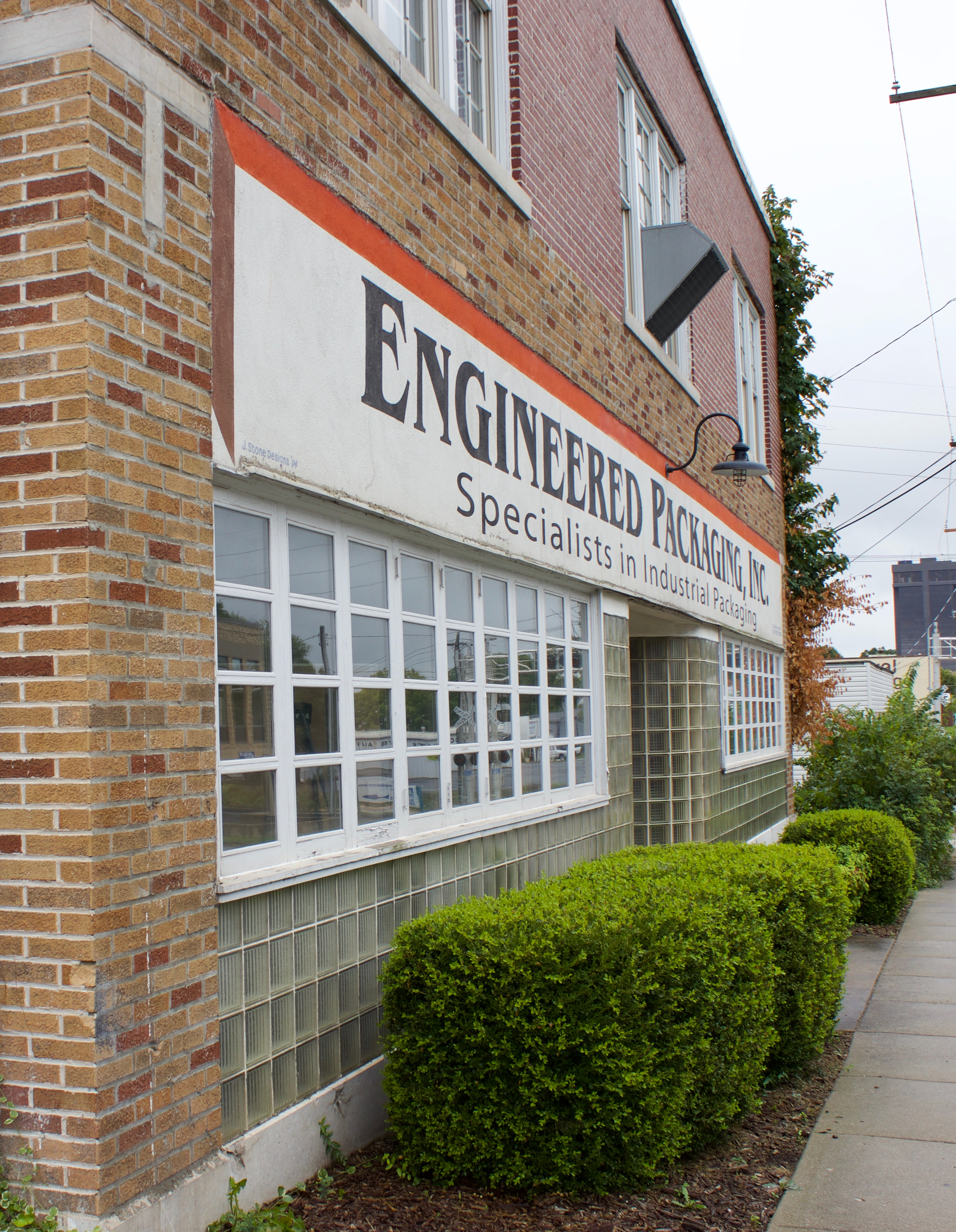

- Location within Missouri Location within the United States
- Location: 1350 St. Louis St., Springfield, Missouri
- Coordinates: 37°12′7″N 93°17′57″W
- Area: 1.6 acres (0.65 ha)
- Built: 1936
- Architectural style: Factory
- MPS: Springfield MPS
- NRHP reference No.: 05000751
- Added to NRHP: July 27, 2005

J.E. King Manufacturing Company, also known as the Long-King Furniture, Cloud Furniture Manufacturing, and Springfield Seed Company, is a historic daylight factory building located at Springfield, Greene County, Missouri. It was built in 1922, and expanded in the 1930s and 1940s. It is a two-story, L-shaped red brick building with a Streamline Moderne Style-influenced glass block storefront at first floor level. Also on the property is a contributing building that housed electrical transformers.

It was listed on the National Register of Historic Places in 2005.
