= Campbell Avenue Historic District =

Historic district in Missouri, United States

- U.S. National Register of Historic Places
- U.S. Historic district
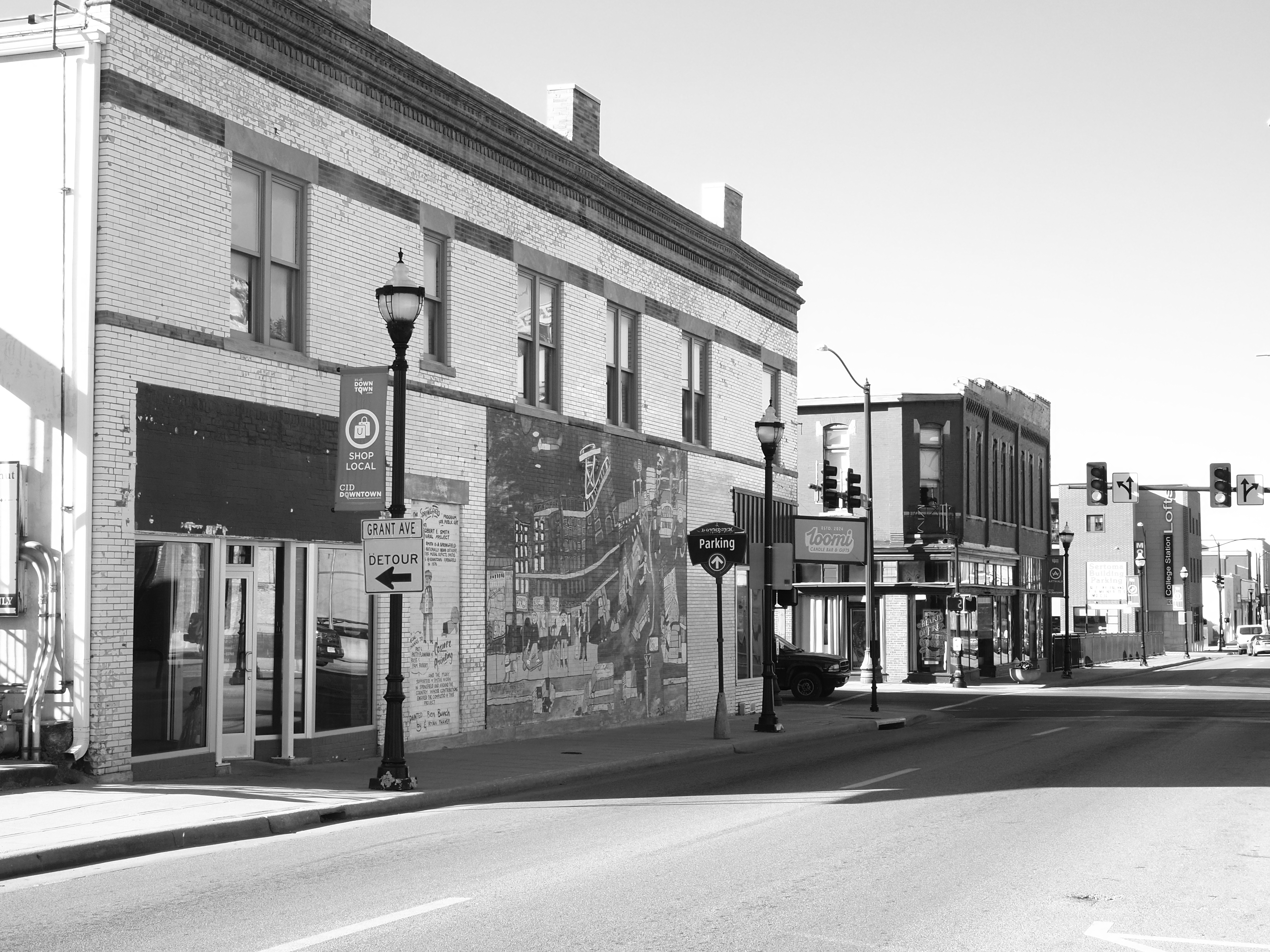

- Location within Missouri Location within the United States
- Location: 200 and 300 blocks of S. Campbell Ave. and 300 block of Park Central West, 318 and 322-326 S. Campbell Avenue, Springfield, Missouri
- Coordinates: 37°12′30″N 93°17′38″W
- Area: 1.1 acres (0.45 ha)
- Built: 1885
- Architectural style: Italianate, Colonial Revival, Early Commercial
- MPS: Springfield MPS
- NRHP reference No.: 99000714, 05001433 (Boundary Increase)
- Added to NRHP: June 25, 1999, December 23, 2005 (Boundary Increase)

Campbell Avenue Historic District is a national historic district located in Springfield, Missouri, United States. The district encompasses 11 contributing buildings in a commercial section of Springfield. The district developed between about 1885 and 1948, and it includes representative examples of Italianate and Colonial Revival style architecture. Notable buildings include the McLaughlin Block (c. 1890) and Busy Bee Department Store (c. 1915).

It was added to the National Register of Historic Places in 1999 with a boundary increase in 2005.
