= Walnut Street Historic District (Springfield, Missouri) =

Historic district in Missouri, United States

- U.S. National Register of Historic Places
- U.S. Historic district
- Location within Missouri Location within the United States
- Location: Roughly bounded by McDaniel, Walnut, and Elm Sts. and the Sherman Parkway; also roughly along E. Walnut St. in the 700 and 800 blocks, Springfield, Missouri
- Coordinates: 37°12′24″N 93°15′59″W
- Area: 80 acres (32 ha)
- Built: 1870
- Architect: Multiple
- Architectural style: Italianate, Late 19th And 20th Century Revivals, Bungalow/Craftsman, Queen Anne
- NRHP reference No.: 85000623, 02000833 (Boundary Increase)
- Added to NRHP: March 21, 1985, October 19, 2001 (Boundary Decrease), August 5, 2002 (Boundary Increase)

The Walnut Street Historic District is a national historic district located in Springfield, Missouri, United States. The district encompasses more than 150 one and two story frame, brick, cast-stone, or stone dwellings in a thirteen block area. The district includes parts of East Walnut Street, East Elm Street, East McDaniel Street, Cordova Court, South Hampton Avenue, South Florence Avenue, and South National Avenue. The district developed between about 1870 and 1940, with 21 buildings surviving from before 1900, and 59 buildings dating between 1901 and 1910.

It was added to the National Register of Historic Places in 1985, with a boundary decrease in 2001 and boundary increase in 2002.
