= McDaniel Building =

- U.S. National Register of Historic Places
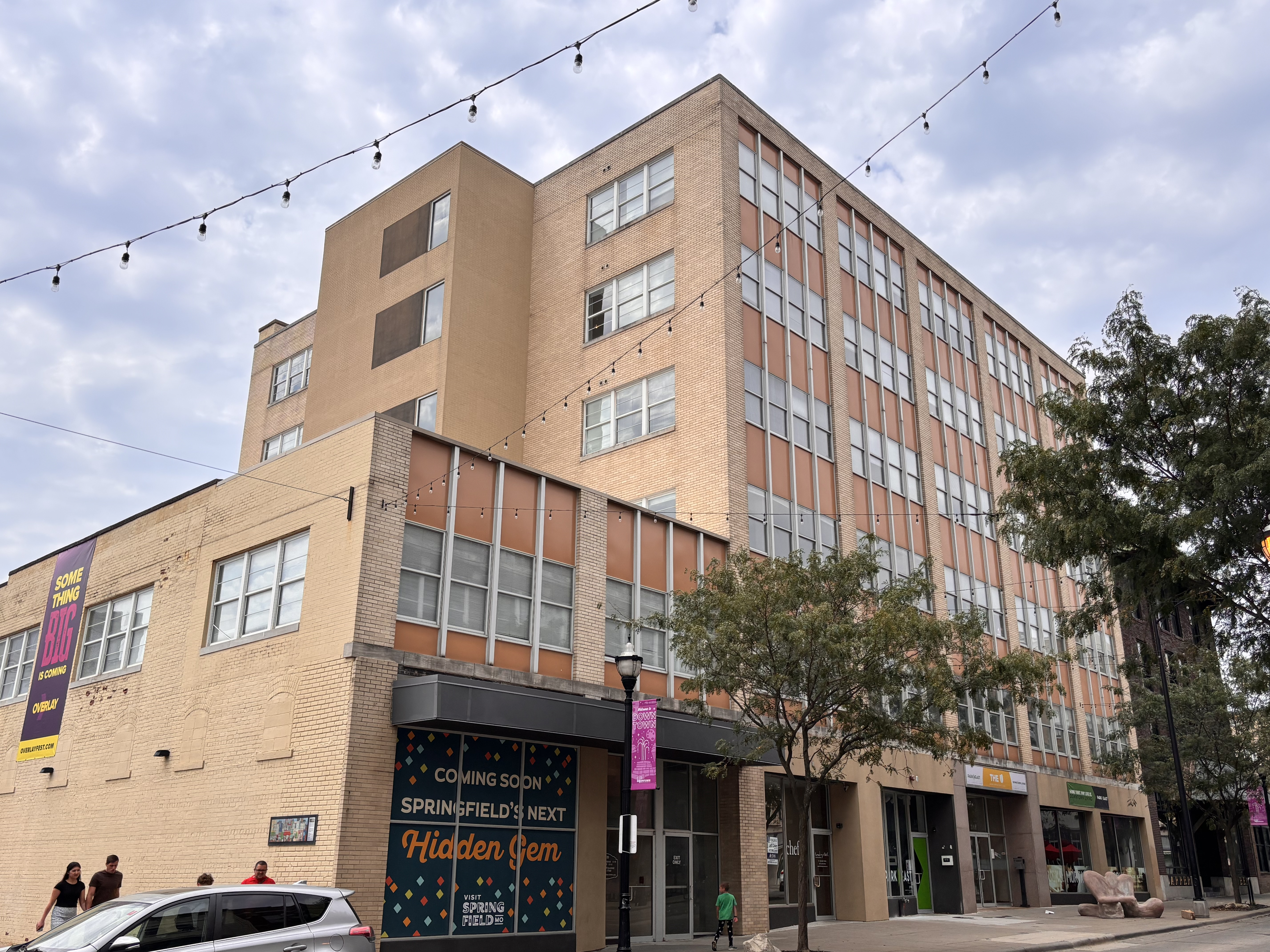
- The McDaniel Building in Springfield, MO as seen from the corner of St. Louis St. and Jefferson Ave. (ca. 2025)

- Location within Missouri Location within the United States
- Location: 316 Park Central E., Springfield, Missouri
- Coordinates: 37°12′33″N 93°17′28″W
- Area: Less than 1 acre (0.40 ha)
- Built: 1961
- Built by: Carson, John
- Architect: Amsbacher, Joe
- Architectural style: Mid-Century Modern
- NRHP reference No.: 14000871
- Added to NRHP: October 22, 2014

McDaniel Building is a historic commercial building located in Springfield, Missouri. It was built in 1911 but remodeled into its current form in 1961, and houses a six-story with a Mid-Century Modern style of building, containing a two-story main section, two-bay section and a tall one-story rear section. It has buff brick walls, a curtain wall façade, and a flat roof.

It was listed on the National Register of Historic Places in 2014.

== History ==
In April, 1911, local banker H. B. McDaniel began construction on the McDaniel Building on the lot vacated by the Baldwin Theater after a disastrous fire.

The 1961 reconstruction of the McDaniel Building represents one of the most dramatic remodeling projects undertaken by the Heer-Andres Investment Company, which played a major role in area commerce for decades. In March, 1961, Dorsey Heer told the Springfield Leader and Press that a remodel project was underway, totaling $500,000 and stating, "we'll have a completely new building when the work is finished." The McDaniel Building remained one of Springfield's largest downtown office buildings until 2014.

In 2014, the Vecino Group announced plans to remodel the building after just having purchased it. The redevelopment planned for 39 apartment units with the ground floor rented as retail.

The building is an example of porcelain enamel curtain wall construction in Springfield and it provides a snapshot of Mid-Century Modernism in Springfield.
