= South Avenue Commercial Historic District =

Historic district in Missouri, United States

- U.S. National Register of Historic Places
- U.S. Historic district
- Location within Missouri Location within the United States
- Location: Walnut and Pershing Sts., South and Robberson Aves., Springfield, Missouri
- Coordinates: 37°12′23″N 93°17′30″W
- Area: 1.6 acres (0.65 ha)
- Built: 1895
- Architectural style: Italianate, Colonial Revival, et al.
- MPS: Springfield MPS
- NRHP reference No.: 99000713
- Added to NRHP: June 25, 1999

South Avenue Commercial Historic District is a national historic district located in Springfield, Missouri, United States. The district encompasses 10 contributing buildings in a commercial section of Springfield. The district developed between about 1895 and 1949, and it includes representative examples of Italianate and Colonial Revival style architecture. Notable buildings include the Medical Arts Building (1929) and Springfield Life Building/Savoy Hotel/Hotel Seville (c. 1906, 1928).

It was added to the National Register of Historic Places in 1999.
