= Clear Creek (Sac River tributary) =

Stream in the US state of Missouri

Clear Creek is a stream in Greene County, Missouri, United States. It is a tributary of the Sac River.

The headwaters arise along the railroad line near the community of Elwood southwest of the Springfield airport at 37°13′42″N 93°25′21″W. The stream flows to the northwest passing under U.S. Route 160 between Willard and Ash Grove. South of the community of Phenix the stream gains the flow of the south flowing Sugar Creek and turns west-northwest to its confluence with the Sac near the Greene - Dade county line at 37°22′32″N 93°37′03″W.

Clear Creek was named for the clear water which characterizes this stream.

== See also ==
- List of rivers of Missouri
