= Sayers Creek =

River in the United States of America

Sayers Creek or Sawyer Creek is a stream in Webster and Greene counties of southern Missouri. The headwaters of the stream are in Webster County just to the east of Rogersville and north of U. S. Route 60. The confluence with the James River in Greene County is north of Oak Grove Heights and just east of Missouri Route 125.

== Location ==
The stream source is at 37°08′06″N 93°00′59″W in Webster County and the confluence is at 37°11′34″N 93°07′03″W in Greene County.

== Name ==
Sayers Creek is named after Thomas, John, and Hiram Sayers, the original owners of the site.

== See also ==
- List of rivers of Missouri
