= McDaniel Lake =

- Location within Missouri Location within the United States
- Location: Greene County, Missouri
- Coordinates: 37°17′42″N 093°18′53″W
- Type: Water Source reservoir
- Basin countries: United States
- Surface area: 300 acres (120 ha)
- Surface elevation: 1,122 ft (342 m)
- Settlements: Glidewell, Ebenezer

McDaniel Lake is a 300-acre (1.2 km^{2}) source of water for the city of Springfield, Missouri owned and operated by City Utilities of Springfield as their public water source. Despite being 5 miles (8.0 km) north of the city limits, the Springfield Police Department has primary jurisdiction over the lake, shorelines and corresponding city-owned land (the utility is fully owned by the City of Springfield).

== Recreational activities ==
McDaniel Lake is considered a "restricted" lake meaning boating, floating, swimming and docks are not allowed on the water surface. Fishing, however is allowed and encouraged off of the 50-yard (46 m) concrete bridge running west to east over the lake at one of its smaller sections.

== Lake creation and etymology ==
McDaniel Lake was created by impounding the Little Sac River in 1929, making it one of the oldest man-made dams in the area, with the dam at Fellows Lake being built in 1957. The McDaniel Lake dam was raised to increase lake-water storage in 1992, making it more visible from the solitary bridge.

== Fishing and accessibility ==
The lake is only accessible by vehicle at two points: one being Farm Roads 145/151 and a second at a smaller crossing on Farm Road 159. Both roads contain large bridges from which people can fish, though the Farm Road 145/151 bridge is popularized as being a better fishing location.

The lake boasts a variable amount of species of fish including carp, small mouth bass and large mouth bass, white bass, channel catfish and several sunfish. The lake itself is quickly gathering attention as being a top site in Southwest Missouri for fishing due to its serenity and peacefulness.
