= Glidewell =

Glidewell may refer to:

- Glidewell (surname)
- Glidewell, Missouri
