= Great Southern Bank Arena =

Indoor arena in Springfield, Missouri

- The Vault

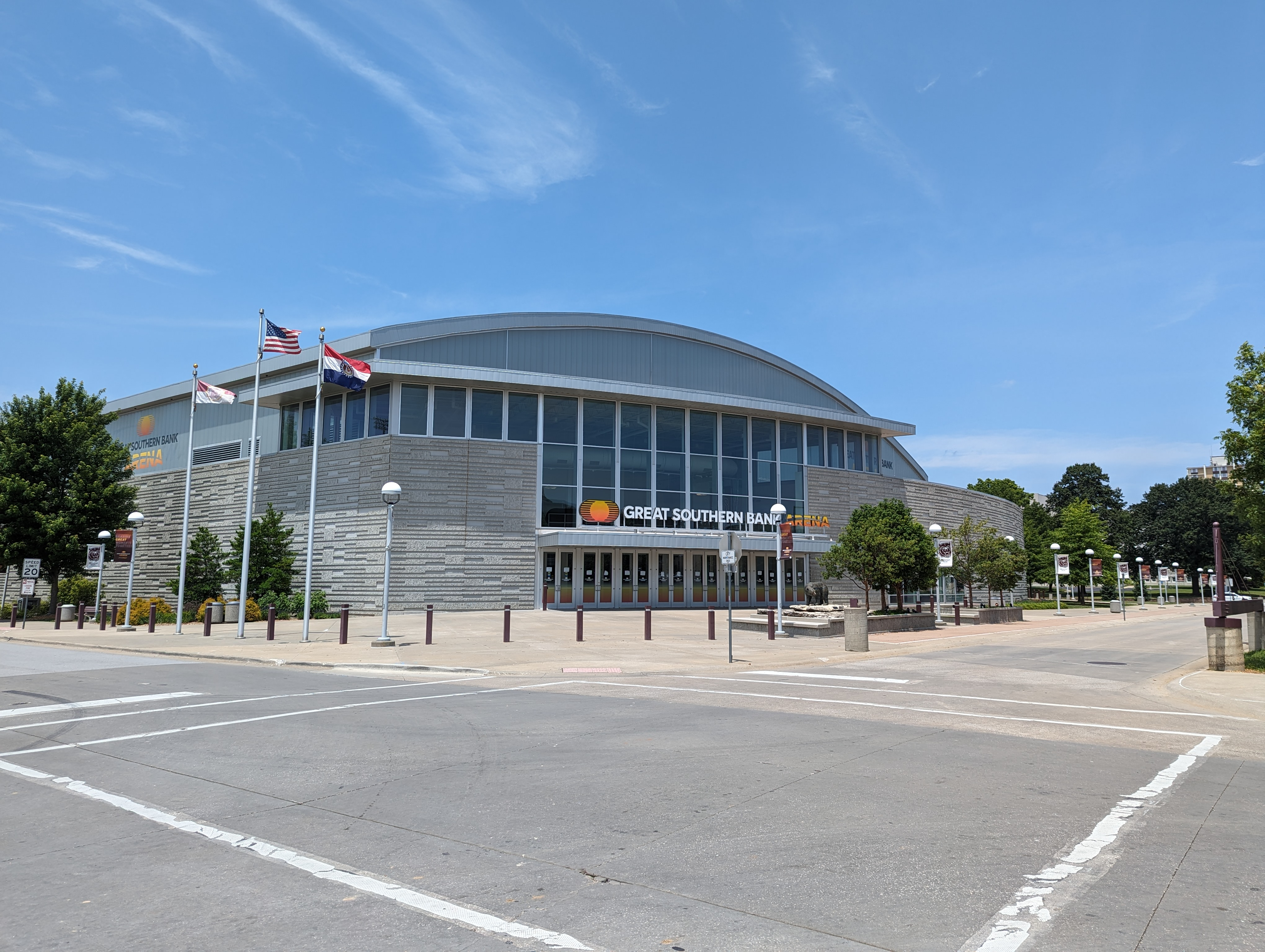
- Exterior view of the arena in 2024
- Former names: JQH Arena (2008–22)
- Address: 685 South John Q. Hammons Parkway; Springfield, MO 65897
- Coordinates: 37°12′7.37″N 93°16′59.01″W
- Owner: Missouri State University
- Capacity: 10,542
- Surface: Multi-surface
- Public transit: Springfield Transit Services

Construction
- Groundbreaking: December 21, 2006
- Opened: November 13, 2008; 18 years ago
- Cost: $67 Million ($107 million in 2025 dollars)
- Architects: Ellerbe Becket; Pellham Phillips Architects & Engineers Inc.
- Structural engineers: Martin/Martin, Inc.
- Services engineers: Henderson Engineers, Inc.
- General contractor: J. E. Dunn Construction Group

Tenants
- Missouri State Bears (NCAA) (2008–present); Missouri Thunder (PBR) (2024–present)

Website
- greatsouthernbankarena.com

Great Southern Bank Arena (originally known as JQH Arena) is an indoor arena in Springfield, Missouri. The arena opened in 2008. It is located on the campus of Missouri State University and is the home of the Missouri State Bears and Lady Bears basketball teams.

== Overview ==
There is a maximum seating capacity of 11,000. Included in the seating capacity are 9,637 chairback seats, 122 seats for permanently disabled guests, 114 loge seats, and 22 private suites. 55 courtside seats are arranged for basketball games and 1,363 bleacher back seats in the end zones are reserved for students. There are 166 public restroom stations (98 for women and 70 for men), six concession stands with 42 points of sale plus 12 additional portable locations, and 2 elevators. Located just off the main lobby area is a team store selling Missouri State University apparel and souvenirs. Maximum seating for concerts with an end-stage is 10,542.

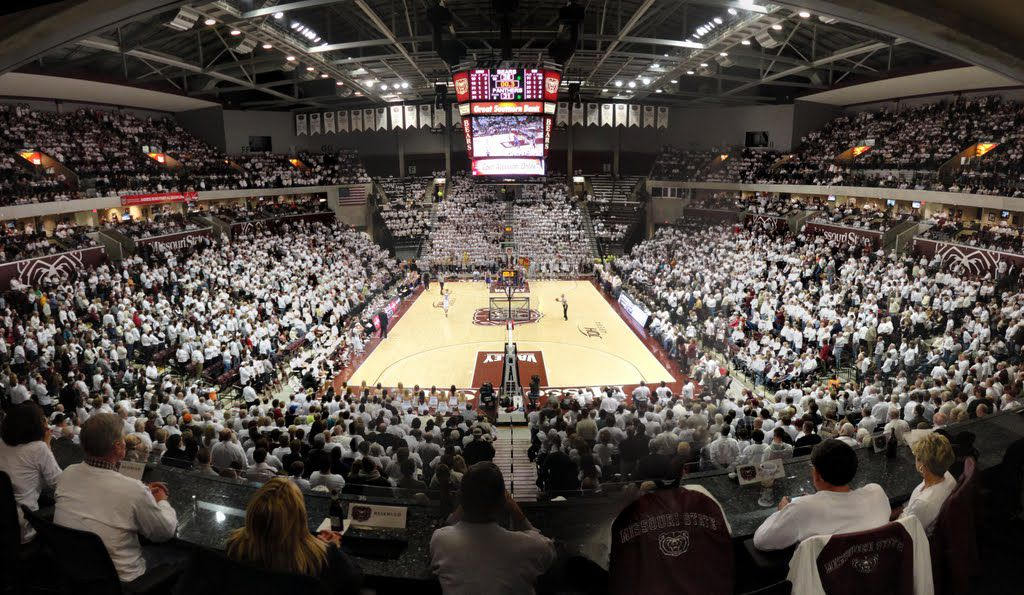
Interior view in 2018

The arena bears the initials of John Q. Hammons, a Springfield-based hotel developer and Missouri State alumnus who donated $30 million for the arena's construction. JQH Arena replaced the Hammons Student Center (also named in honor of its major donor) in terms of function and is connected with the Hammons Student Center via an underground corridor.

The venue underwent a name change in April 2022. Naming rights were purchased by Great Southern Bank for $5.5 million.

The band Eagles played the inaugural concert at JQH on November 13, 2008, in front of a sold-out crowd of 10,550.

GSB Arena currently co-hosts the Missouri State High School Activities Association state basketball semifinals with the Hammons Center. All championship games are played in the arena.

JQH Arena had been a regular stop of the Professional Bull Riders (PBR)'s Premier Series from 2009 through 2019. In 2024 and 2025, Great Southern Bank Arena was the home arena of the Missouri Thunder; one of the PBR's ten teams during the Team Series season. Thunder Ridge Nature Arena in Ridgedale, Missouri, had previously served as the Missouri Thunder's home arena in 2022 and 2023. The Missouri Thunder returned to Thunder Ridge Nature Arena in 2026.

== Attendance Records ==
Rank	Attendance	Date	Game Result
1	11,077	February 26, 2011	Missouri State 69, Wichita State 64
2	10,881	November 22, 2008	Missouri State 62, Arkansas 57
3	10,776	January 11, 2014	#6 Wichita State 72, Missouri State 69 (OT)
4	10,655	January 22, 2011	Missouri State 67, Creighton 66
5	10,008	January 1, 2010	Missouri State 68, Illinois State 64
6	9,901	January 30, 2011	Northern Iowa 60, Missouri State 59
7	9,376	January 28, 2012	Missouri State 63, Northern Iowa 51
8	9,134	January 11, 2011	Missouri State 65, Evansville 50
9	9,124	January 18, 2012	#18 Creighton 66, Missouri State 65
10	9,111	January 9, 2010	Missouri State 88, Bradley 69

== Concerts ==
- The Eagles - November 13, 2008
- Casting Crowns - December 2, 2008 and October 4th, 2021
- MercyMe - April 11, 2009 and February 20, 2011
- Larry the Cable Guy - May 2, 2009
- Jeff Dunham - March 13, 2010
- Carrie Underwood - June 15, 2010 and October 28, 2012
- Alan Jackson - September 23, 2010
- Jason Aldean - October 29, 2010 and February 14, 2020
- Trans-Siberian Orchestra - November 5, 2010
- Rascal Flatts and Chris Young - March 5, 2011
- Francesca Battistelli - April 2, 2011
- Elton John - April 16, 2011
- Celtic Woman - April 30, 2011
- Michael Bublé - June 21, 2011
- Miranda Lambert - October 21, 2011, and October 25, 2019
- Third Day - November 10, 2011
- Trans-Siberian Orchestra November 12, 2011
- Lady A (known at that time as Lady Antebellum) and Josh Kelley - December 10, 2011
- MercyMe and Tenth Avenue North (Hawk Nelson) (Rend Collective Experiment) (Sidewalk Prophets) - February 16, 2012
- Scott McCready and Brad Paisley - February 25, 2012
- Sanctus Real - March 26, 2012
- Wiz Khalifa - April 12, 2012
- Matthew West and Casting Crowns - April 24, 2012, and October 4th, 2021
- Eric Church - May 3, 2012
- James Taylor - July 17, 2012, and June 27, 2016
- Rascal Flatts - January 12, 2013
- Kid Rock with Buckcherry - February 5, 2013
- Zac Brown Band - February 16, 2013
- Dierks Bentley and Miranda Lambert - April 12, 2013
- Bob Dylan - April 24, 2013
- Keith Urban - October 20, 2013
- Lady A (known at that time as Lady Antebellum) - December 3, 2013
- The Roadshow with Vertical Church Band - February 6, 2014
- Kiss with Caleb Johnson - July 23, 2016
- Journey with Asia July 3, 2017
- Jim Gaffigan - August 15, 2019
- Chris Stapleton - October 3, 2019
- Shinedown with Papa Roach, Asking Alexandria, and Savage After Midnight - October 5, 2019
- Chris Young with Eli Young Band - November 9, 2019
- Korn with Breaking Benjamin - February 13, 2020
- Kiss with David Lee Roth - February 18, 2020

== See also ==
- List of NCAA Division I basketball arenas
