= Hackney =

Hackney may refer to:

== Places ==
=== London ===
- Hackney, London, a district in London
- Hackney District (Metropolis), a local government district within the metropolitan area of London from 1855 to 1894
- Metropolitan Borough of Hackney, a local government area based on the ancient parish boundaries from 1900 to 1965
- Hackney (electoral division), a division of the Greater London Council from 1965 to 1973
- London Borough of Hackney, a local authority area created in 1965
- Hackney (constituency)
- Hackney College
- Hackney Wick Stadium
- Hackney Empire, a theatre and concert venue
- Hackney RFC, a rugby union club

=== Elsewhere ===
- Hackney, Derbyshire, a village near the town of Matlock, England
- Hackney, Guyana, a village
- Hackney, Kansas, United States
- Hackney, Missouri, United States
- Hackney, South Australia, a suburb of Adelaide, Australia

== Other uses ==
- Hackney (automobile)
- Hackney (surname)
- Hackney horse, a breed of horse
- Hackney pony, a pony breed
- Hackney carriage, taxicabs in London and elsewhere popularly known as 'black cabs'
- Hackney, a type of taxicab in the Republic of Ireland which cannot be "hailed" on the street
