= Harold, Missouri =

Unincorporated community in Missouri, US

Coordinates: 37°22′40″N 93°30′56″W

Harold is an unincorporated community in northwest Greene County, in the U.S. state of Missouri. Harold is located on Missouri Route 123, southeast of Walnut Grove and 1.5 miles east of Phenix.

== History ==
A post office called Harold was established in 1887, and remained in operation until 1907. The community has the name of the original owner of the site.
