= Nathan and Olive Boone Homestead State Historic Site =

Historic house in Missouri, United States

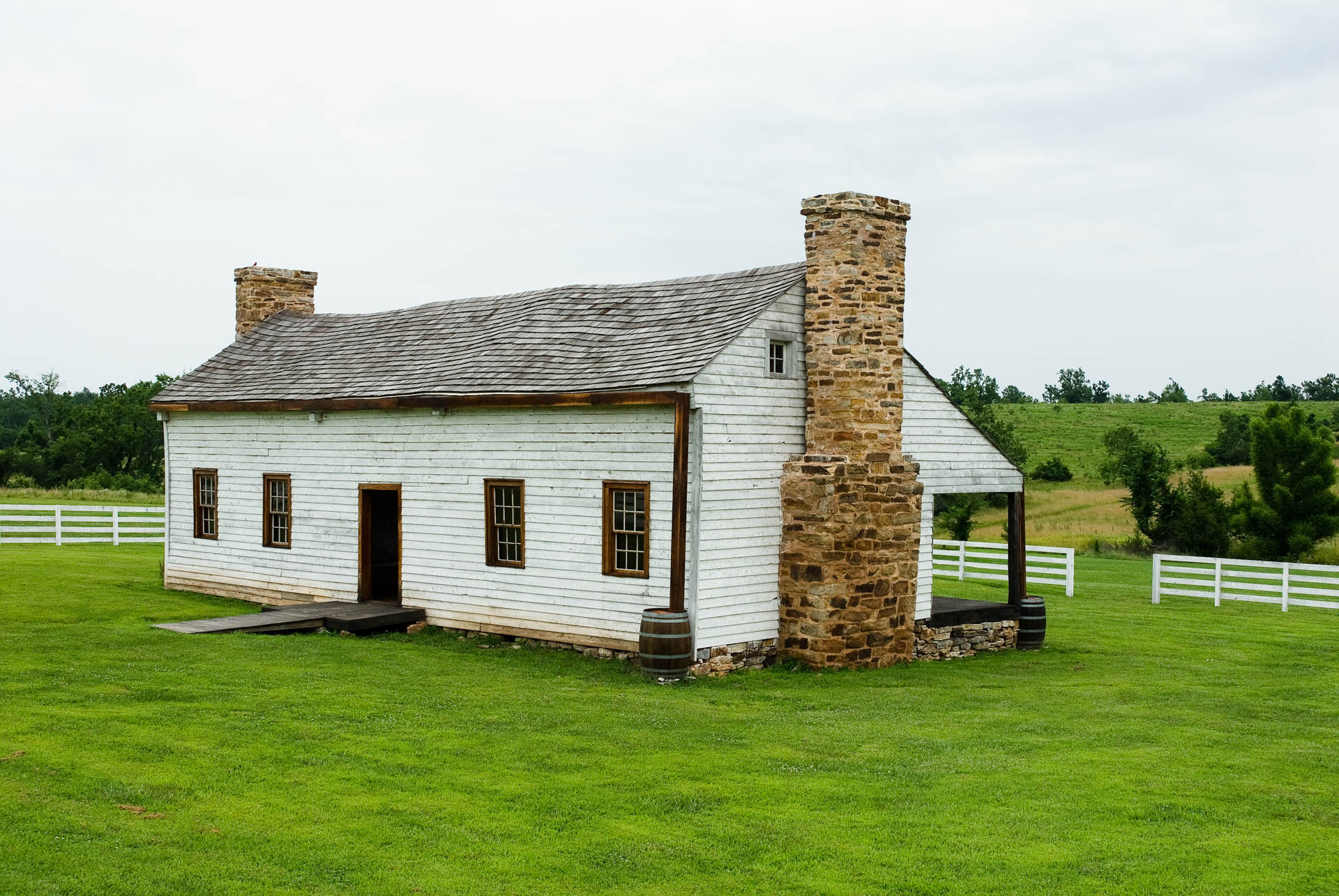

- Location within Missouri Location within the United States
- Location: Greene County, Missouri, United States
- Coordinates: 37°20′48″N 93°34′42″W
- Area: 400.2 acres (162.0 ha)
- Established: 1991
- Governing body: Missouri Department of Natural Resources
- Website: Nathan Boone Homestead State Historic Site
- Nathan Boone House
- U.S. National Register of Historic Places
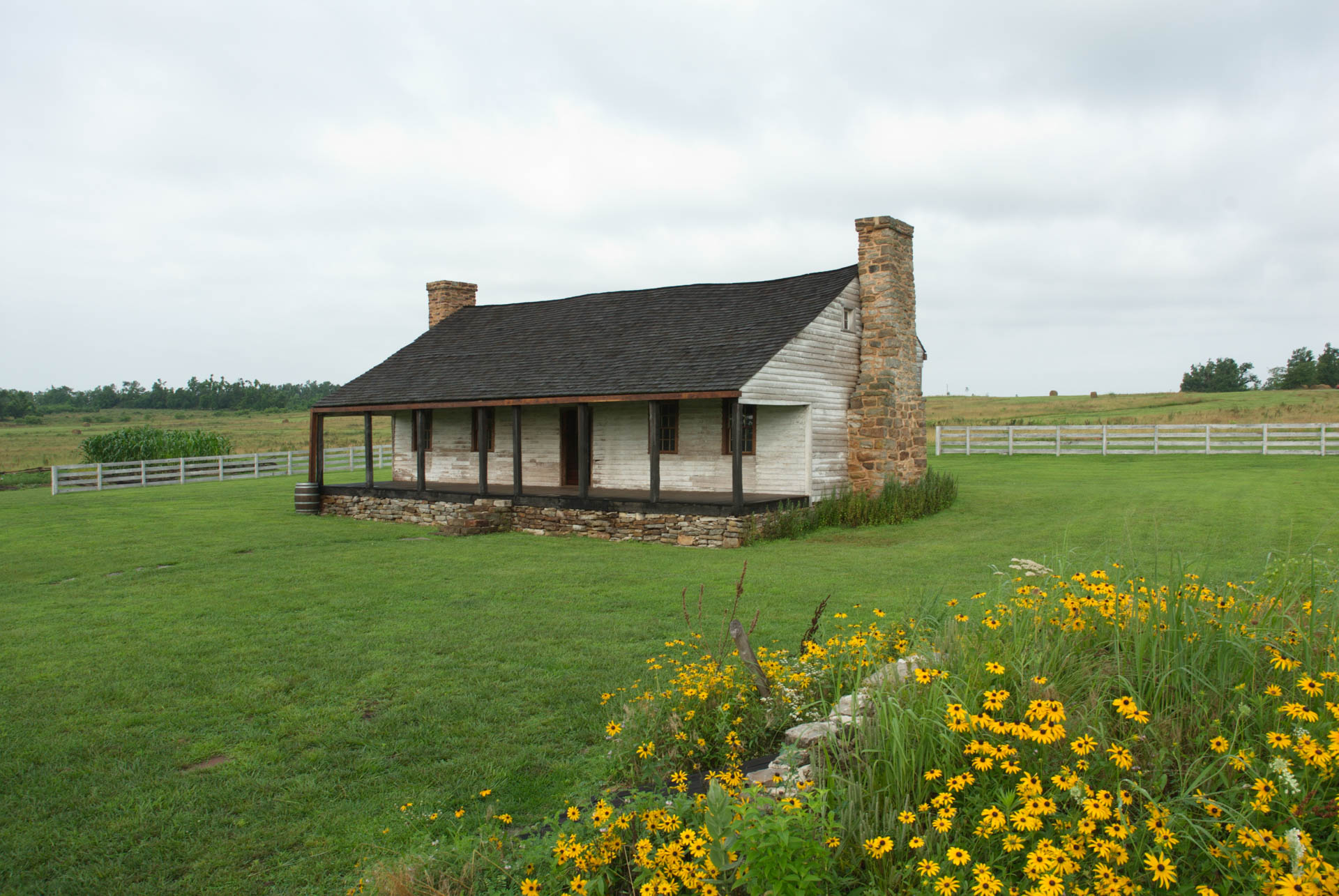
- Location: 1.75 miles (2.82 km) north of Ash Grove on Highway V, near Ash Grove, Missouri
- Area: Less than one acre
- Built: 1837
- Built by: Boone, Nathan; et al.
- Architectural style: Saddle-bag pioneer log house
- NRHP reference No.: 69000103
- Added to NRHP: October 1, 1969

Nathan and Olive Boone Homestead State Historic Site, located two miles north of Ash Grove, Missouri, is a state-owned property that preserves the home built in 1837 by Nathan Boone, the youngest child of Daniel Boone. The Nathan Boone House, which was listed on the National Register of Historic Places in 1969, is a 1 1/2-story "classic" saddle-bag pioneer log house, constructed of hand-hewn oak log walls that rest on a stone foundation. Established in 1991, the historic site offers an interpretive trail plus tours of the home and cemetery.

== See also ==
- Boone's Lick State Historic Site
