= Phenix, Missouri =

Unincorporated community in Greene County, Missouri, United States

Coordinates: 37°22′43″N 93°32′45″W

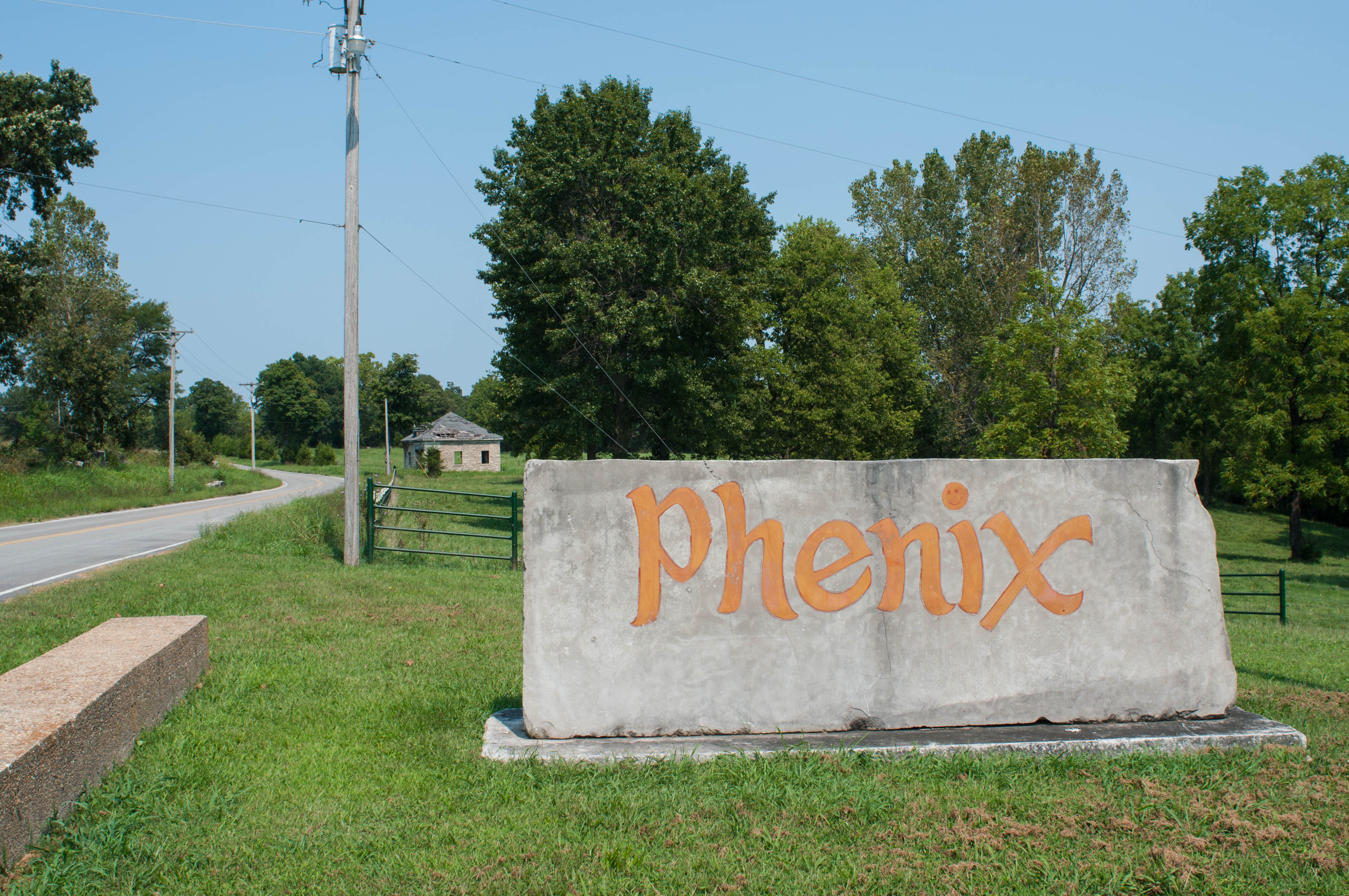
Sign in front of the quarry entrance

Phenix is an unincorporated community in northwest Greene County, Missouri, United States. The community is located on the banks of Sugar Creek, approximately 2.5 miles (4.0 km) south of Walnut Grove and 1.5 miles (2.4 km) west of Harold and Missouri Route 123.

== History ==
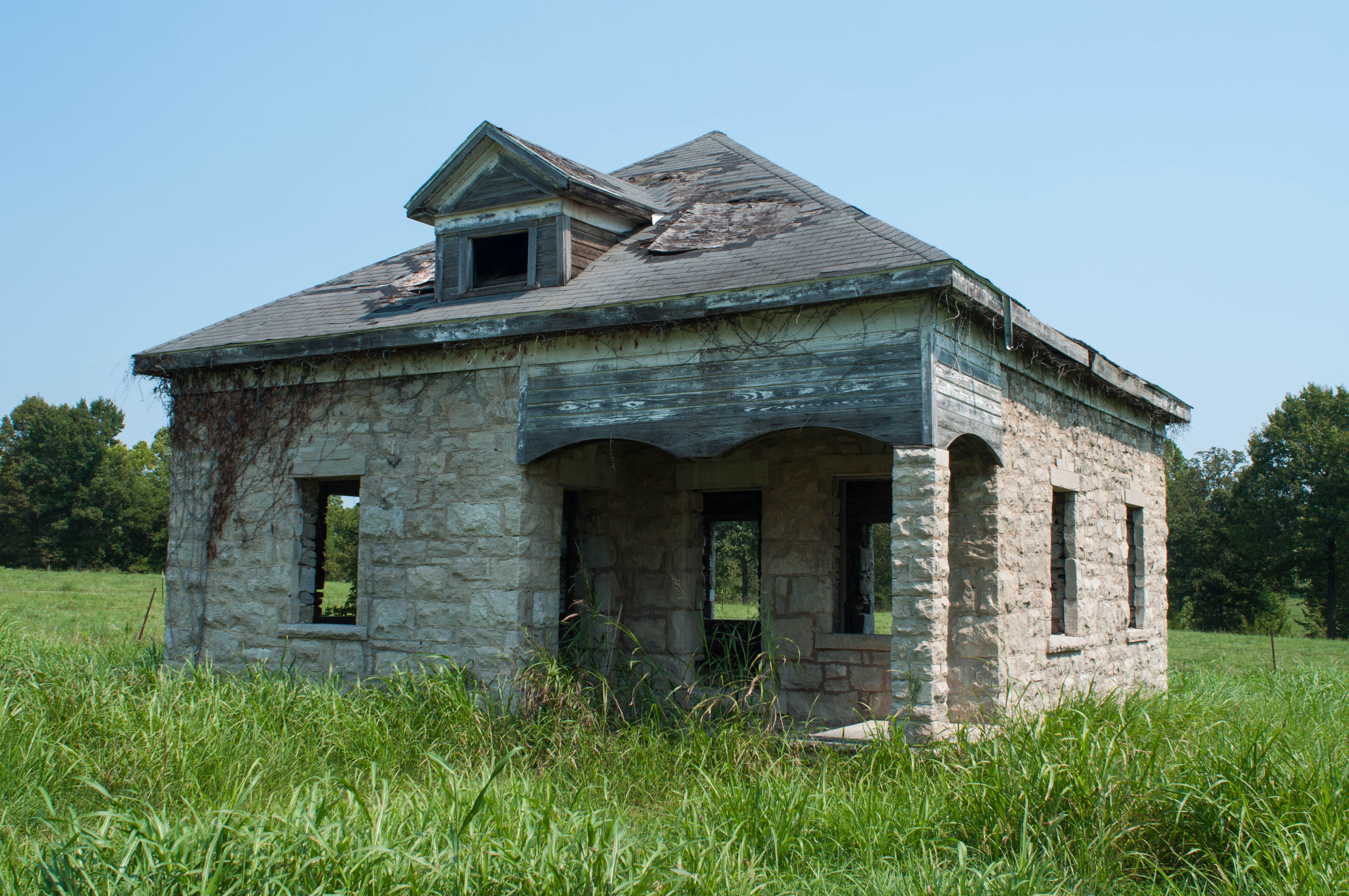
Old house near the quarry

During the railroad boom of the late 1800s the Kansas City, Clinton, and Springfield Rail Co. forged their way through the wilderness between Ash Grove and Walnut Grove, their repeated dynamite blasting revealed deposits of high quality limestone in 1884. A post office called Phenix was established in 1886, and remained in operation until 1942.

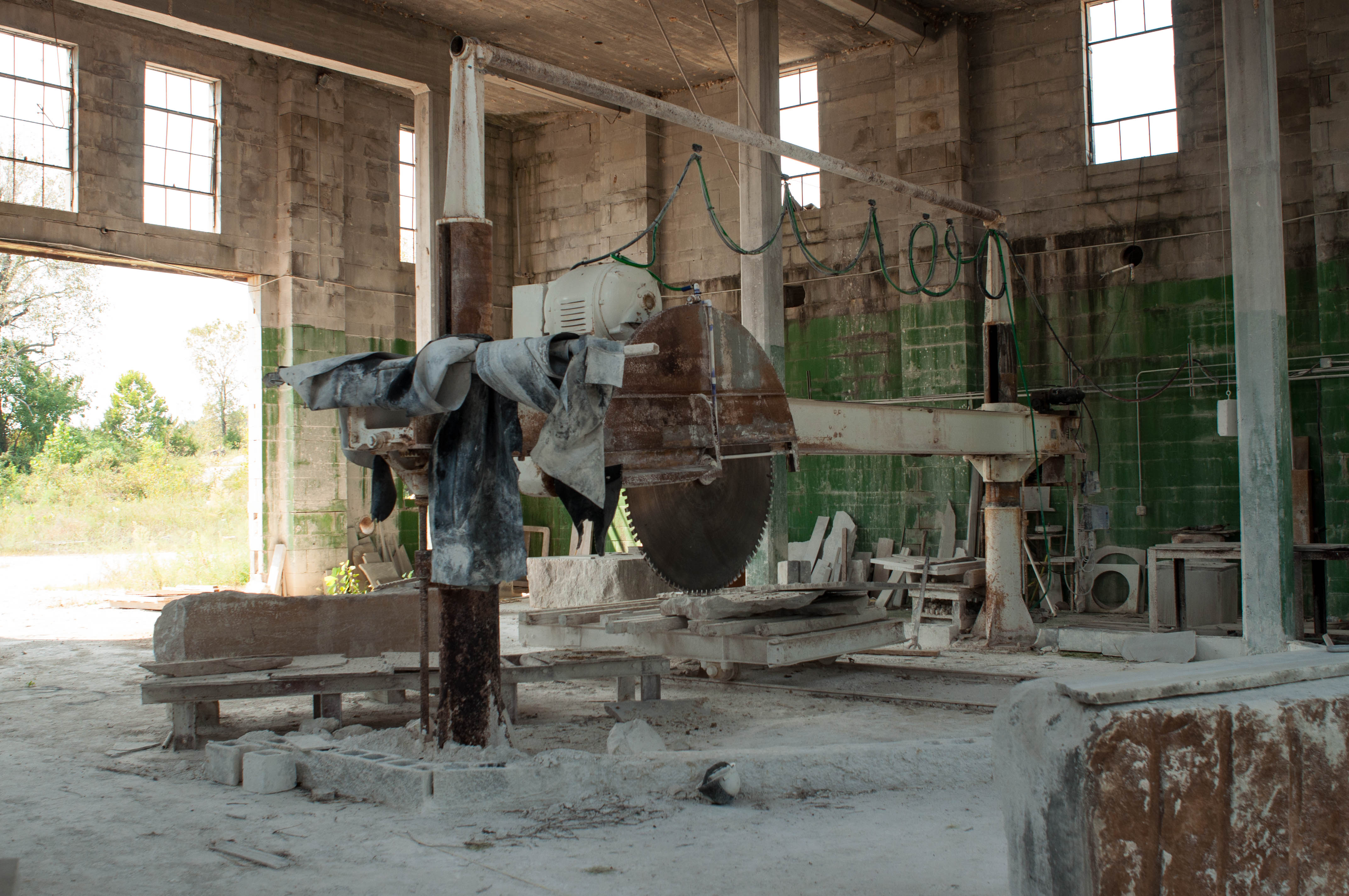
Limestone saw inside main building

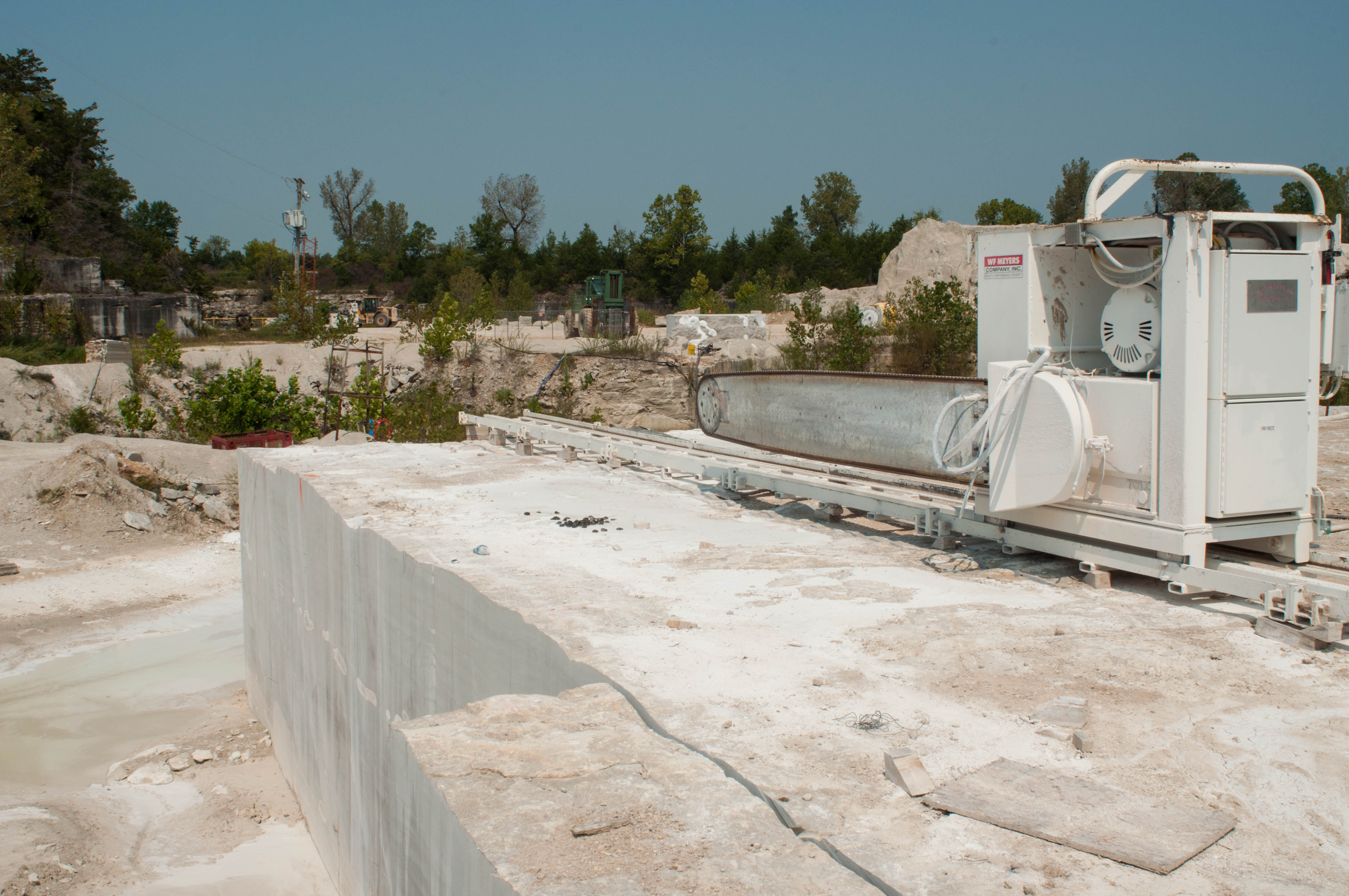
Limestone saw inside quarry

In 1888, this discovery prompted Kansas City investor, C.R. Hunt, to establish a small limestone mining operation. For nearly two decades, Hunt ran the quarry as the Phenix Stone and Lime Company. By 1905, W.J. Grant, a marble finisher from Milwaukee recognized the high quality of Phenix limestone and purchased an interest into Hunts company.

This operation grew over the years, that in 1913, it was named the Phenix Marble Co., which was known for producing Phenix Napoleon Gray Marble which was noted for its resemblance to a kind of French marble from the reign of Napoleon. With this high quality limestone, the industrial development of the small community grew to establish a company owned town, which was typical of the times. In 1902, a general store was established and in 1905 a two-room school house was built. The town hall, city park, and all the homes were owned by the company. A former quarry employee recalled that, "The company would give us script instead of money with which we could purchase supplies at the company store." In 1904, the Missouri Bureau of Geology named Phenix as the largest and best equipped quarry in the state with a community of 500 employees.

During the first three decades of the 20th century, Phenix Marble Company was one of the largest producers of cut limestone and marble west of the Mississippi, producing more than 250,000 cubic feet of stone annually. Production halted during the Great Depression, leading the railroad track used for transportation to be abandoned. During World War II, much of the quarry's iron equipment was scrapped for the war effort.

The Phenix quarry reopened under the management of the Vermont Marble Co. yet failed to regain its previous position in the market. By the 1970s, Phenix was largely a ghost town, the quarry itself was purchased in 1988 by David Richter, who largely used the land as a gravel hauling business. In June 2016 a competing quarry named Conco bought Phenix from Richter and created the current incarnation of Phenix Marble Company.
