= Gilmore Barn =

- The Round Barn (Gilmore Barn)
- U.S. National Register of Historic Places
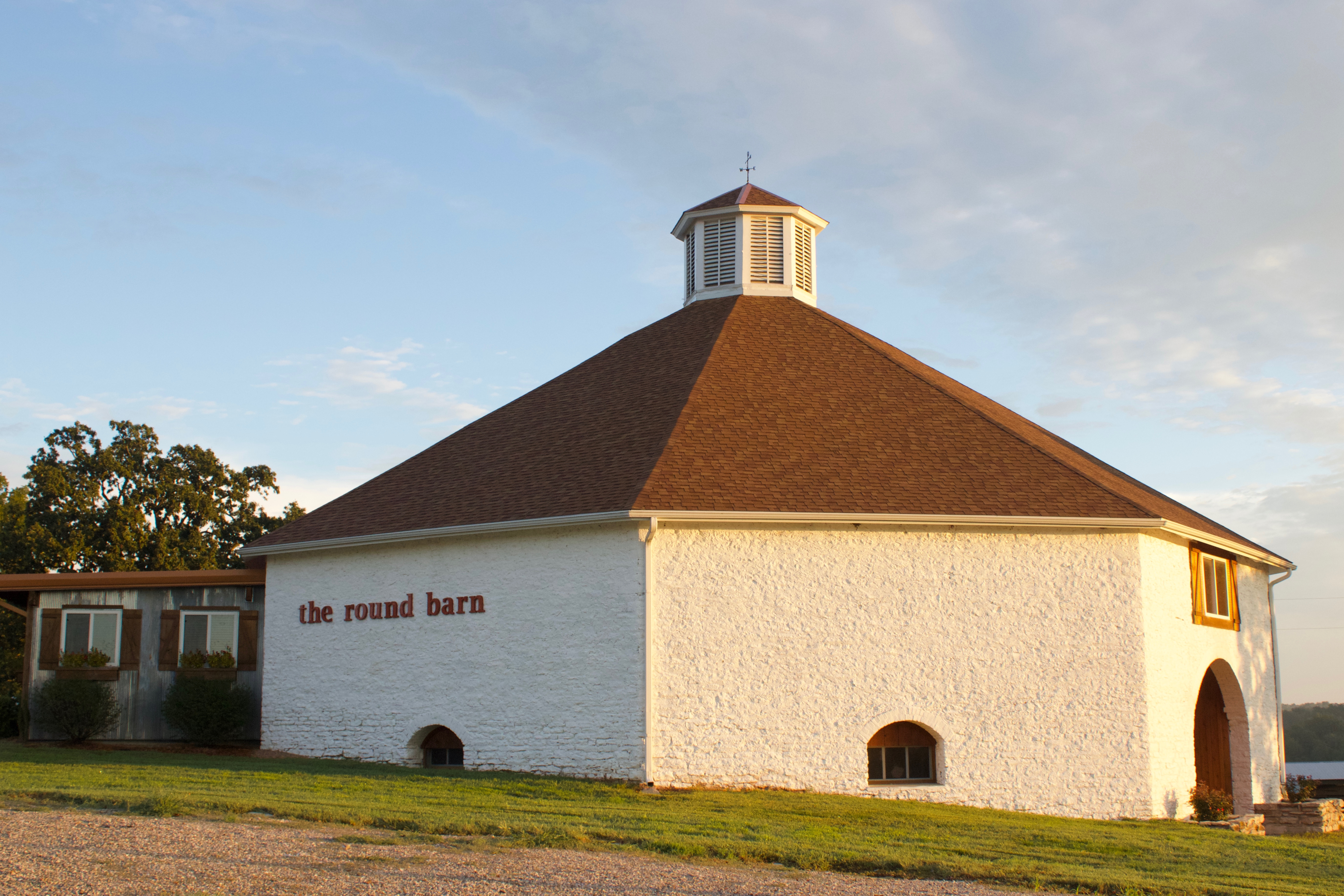

- Location within Missouri Location within the United States
- Location: 10731 U.S. Route 160, Walnut Grove Mo 65770. 3.5 miles (5.6 km) east of Ash Grove, near Ash Grove, Missouri
- Coordinates: 37°19′24″N 93°30′43″W
- Area: less than one acre
- Built: c. 1899
- Architectural style: octagonal barn
- NRHP reference No.: 94000316
- Added to NRHP: April 8, 1994

The Round Barn (Gilmore Barn) is a historic octagonal barn located near Ash Grove, Greene County, Missouri. The Round barn now serves the community as a unique event venue http://www.theroundbarnmo.com/. It was built circa 1899, and is a three-story limestone bank barn, 70 feet in diameter, with interior post and beam framing. The roof is in cone sections topped by an octagonal cupola.

It was listed on the National Register of Historic Places in 1994.
