= Asher Creek =

Stream in Missouri, U.S.

Asher Creek is a stream in Greene and Polk counties of southwest Missouri. It is a tributary of the Little Sac River.

The stream headwaters are just north of Willard at 37°18′47″N 93°25′44″W and the confluence with Little Sac is at 37°26′57″N 93°28′03″W at an elevation of 899 feet. The stream flows north to northwest passing under Route AC and past Cave Spring and on passing west of Sacville and under Route BB to enter Polk County and its confluence with the Little Sac River southwest of Morrisville. Asher Creek has the name of Samuel Asher, a pioneer citizen.

== See also ==
- List of rivers of Missouri
