= Cody, Missouri =

Unincorporated community in Missouri, U.S.

Coordinates: 37°07′07″N 93°07′10″W

Cody was an unincorporated community in southeastern Greene County, in the U.S. state of Missouri. It is currently within the city limits of Rogersville.

Cody was located between Springfield and Rogersville at the intersection of U.S. Route 60 and Missouri Route 125.

== History ==
A post office called Cody was established in 1901, and remained in operation until 1905. The community has the name of William Frederick "Buffalo Bill" Cody.
