= Berry Cemetery =

Historic African-American cemetery in Greene County, Missouri, US

- U.S. National Register of Historic Places
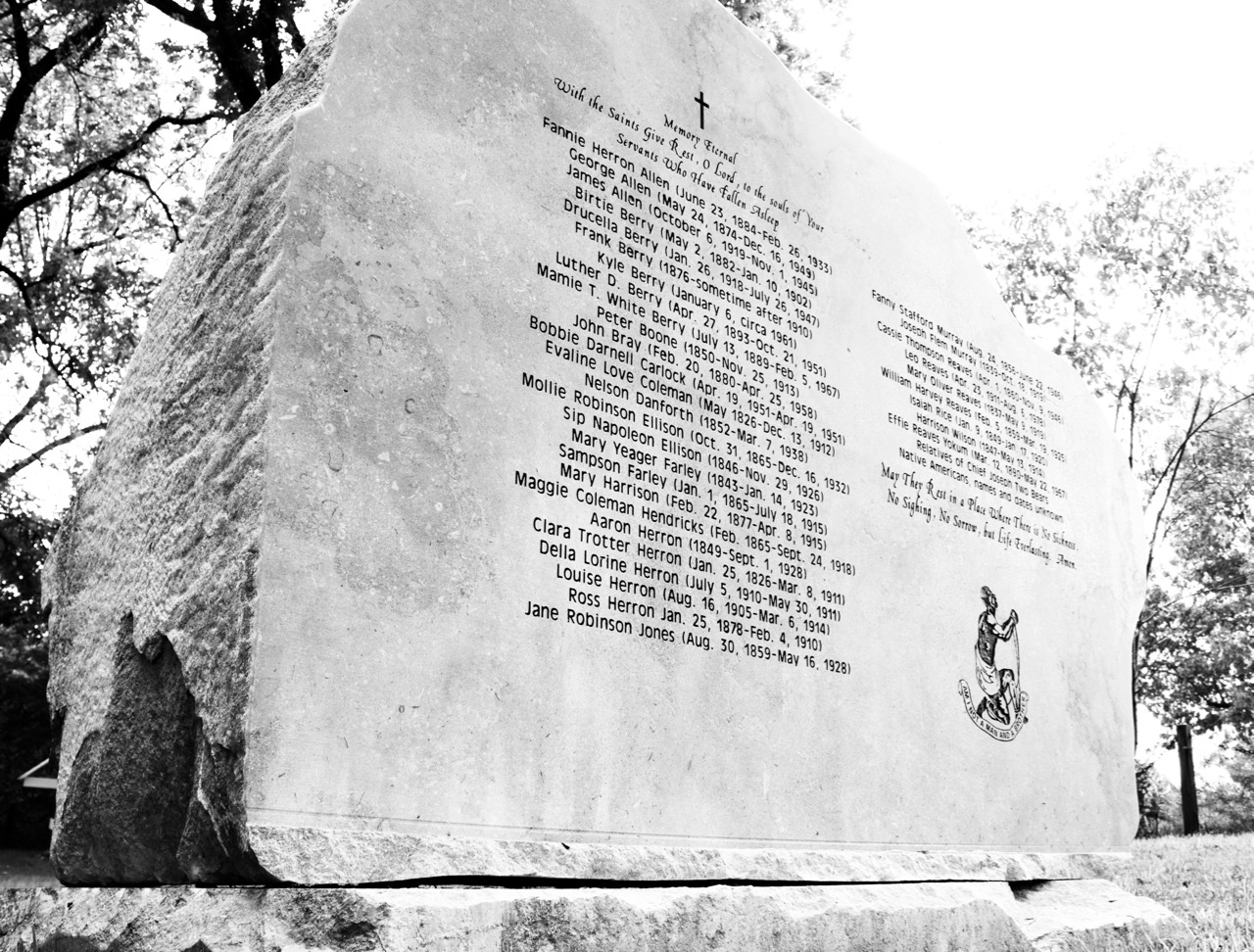
- Monument in the cemetery

- Location within Missouri Location within the United States
- Location: 1431 W. Farm Road 74, near Ash Grove, Missouri
- Coordinates: 37°19′26″N 93°36′0″W
- Area: 1 acre (0.40 ha)
- Architectural style: Rural Cemetery
- NRHP reference No.: 04001224
- Added to NRHP: November 13, 2004

Berry Cemetery, also known as Holy Resurrection Cemetery, is a historic cemetery located near Ash Grove, Greene County, Missouri. It was established about 1875, and is a small, rural African-American cemetery. It contains 48 marked graves dating from 1875 to 1948. It may also contain Native American burials in three burial mounds.

It was listed on the National Register of Historic Places in 2004.
