= Logan, Greene County, Missouri =

Unincorporated community in Missouri, U.S.

Coordinates: 37°08′43″N 93°08′18″W

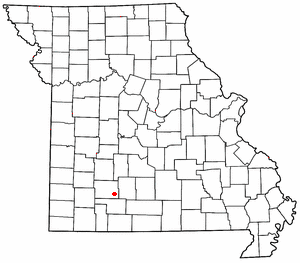

Logan is a school and small unincorporated community in southeastern Greene County, Missouri, United States. directly adjacent to Rogersville. It is located approximately 5 mi (8.0 km) west-northwest of Rogersville, one mile north of U.S. Route 60 and one mile west of Route 125. The community is centered on the school and includes several homes and the Logan Cemetery.

The school and community was named for a local family.
