= Hackney Wick (disambiguation) =

Hackney Wick is a neighbourhood in east London, England.

Hackney Wick may also refer to:

- Hackney Wicked, an annual arts festival in Hackney Wick
- Hackney Wick FC, a football club
- Hackney Wick railway station
- Hackney Wick Stadium, a former greyhound racing stadium
- Hackney Wick Wolves, a speedway opened in 1935 at Hackney Wick Stadium

== See also ==
- Hackney (disambiguation)
- Wick (disambiguation)
