= Oak Grove Heights, Missouri =

Unincorporated community in Missouri, U.S.

Coordinates: 37°10′26″N 93°07′07″W

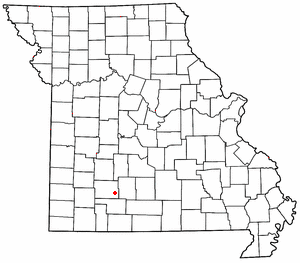

Oak Grove Heights is an Unincorporated community in eastern Greene County, Missouri, United States. It is located on Route 125, approximately five miles northwest of Rogersville and one mile south of the James River.

The community grew around the location of the Oak Grove School which was two miles west of the James River community of Turners and just northeast of Turner Creek and the old St. Louis–San Francisco Railway (currently the BNSF Railway) which followed the stream course.
