= Palmetto, Missouri =

Unincorporated community in Missouri, U.S.

Coordinates: 37°08′32″N 93°05′44″W

Palmetto is an unincorporated community in southeastern Greene County, in the U.S. state of Missouri. The community lies at an elevation of 1437 feet and is located near the headwaters of Turner Creek on the BNSF Railway, approximately two miles northwest of Rogersville. Henderson in western Webster County lies approximately 1.5 miles to the east along Missouri Route D.

== History ==
A post office called Palmetto was established in 1890, and remained in operation until 1914.

It is unknown why the name Palmetto was applied to this community.
