= Avalon Park =

Avalon Park may refer to some communities in the United States and Israel:

- Avalon Park, Alabama, in Jefferson County, Alabama
- Avalon Park, Florida
- Avalon Park, Chicago, Illinois, a neighborhood
  - 83rd Street/Avalon Park station
- Avalon Park, Missouri
- Avalon Park, Bahad 1, Mavet La Rasar
- Avalon Park is also the name of a resort and spa complex in Miskolc, Hungary.
