= Greene County Library =

Greene County Library may refer to:

- Greene County Library, a branch of the Azalea Regional Library System
- Springfield Greene County Library, in Springfield, Missouri
