= Cave Spring, Missouri =

Unincorporated community in Missouri, U.S.

Coordinates: 37°21′05″N 93°27′49″W

Cave Spring or Cave Springs is an unincorporated community in Cass Township, Greene County, Missouri, United States. The community is on Missouri Route AC, 1.3 miles east of Pearl and Missouri Route 123. The community lies on the east bank of Asher Creek.

A post office called Cave Spring was established in 1871, and remained in operation until 1907. The community was named for a large spring flowing out of a cave on nearby Asher Creek.
