= Pearl, Missouri =

Unincorporated community in Missouri, U.S.

Coordinates: 37°21′06″N 93°29′12″W

Pearl is an unincorporated community in northwest Greene County, in the U.S. state of Missouri. Pearl is located on Missouri Route 123, four miles northwest of Willard. Cave Spring lies approximately one mile to the east.

== History ==
A post office called Pearl was established in 1886, and remained in operation until 1928. The community was named after a local child.
