= 1964 United States presidential election in Missouri =

- November 3, 1964

Nominee	Lyndon B. Johnson	Barry Goldwater
Party	Democratic	Republican
Home state	Texas	Arizona
Running mate	Hubert Humphrey	William E. Miller
Electoral vote	12	0
Popular vote	1,164,344	653,535
Percentage	64.05%	35.95%
County results
Johnson
50–60%
60–70%
70–80%
80–90%
Goldwater
50–60%
60–70%
President before election
Lyndon B. Johnson
Democratic
Elected President
Lyndon B. Johnson
Democratic

The 1964 United States presidential election in Missouri took place on November 3, 1964, as part of the 1964 United States presidential election. Voters chose 12 representatives, or electors, to the Electoral College, who voted for president and vice president.

Missouri was won by incumbent President Lyndon B. Johnson (D–Texas), with 64.05 percent of the popular vote, against Senator Barry Goldwater (R–Arizona), with 35.95 percent. As of the 2024 presidential election, this is the last time that Perry, Holt, Lawrence, Jasper, Polk, Greene, Cooper, Newton, Cape Girardeau, Barry, St. Charles, and Barton Counties voted for a Democratic presidential candidate.

== Results ==
Presidential Candidate	Running Mate	Party	Electoral Vote (EV)	Popular Vote (PV)	
Lyndon B. Johnson	Hubert H. Humphrey	Democrat	12	1,164,344	64.05%
Barry Goldwater	William Miller	Republican	0	653,535	35.95%

=== Results by county ===
County	Lyndon B. Johnson Democratic		Barry Goldwater Republican		Margin		Total votes cast
County	#	%	#	%	#	%	Total votes cast
Adair	4,235	54.24%	3,573	45.76%	662	8.48%	7,808
Andrew	3,211	55.31%	2,594	44.69%	617	10.62%	5,805
Atchison	2,870	63.45%	1,653	36.55%	1,217	26.90%	4,523
Audrain	7,387	69.02%	3,316	30.98%	4,071	38.04%	10,703
Barry	5,307	52.73%	4,757	47.27%	550	5.46%	10,064
Barton	3,173	57.64%	2,332	42.36%	841	15.28%	5,505
Bates	5,162	59.50%	3,514	40.50%	1,648	19.00%	8,676
Benton	2,030	45.04%	2,477	54.96%	-447	-9.92%	4,507
Bollinger	2,792	56.78%	2,125	43.22%	667	13.56%	4,917
Boone	14,758	65.73%	7,695	34.27%	7,063	31.46%	22,453
Buchanan	24,164	67.75%	11,501	32.25%	12,663	35.50%	35,665
Butler	7,710	57.86%	5,616	42.14%	2,094	15.72%	13,326
Caldwell	2,475	53.80%	2,125	46.20%	350	7.60%	4,600
Callaway	5,916	66.48%	2,983	33.52%	2,933	32.96%	8,899
Camden	2,522	49.17%	2,607	50.83%	-85	-1.66%	5,129
Cape Girardeau	11,431	56.57%	8,776	43.43%	2,655	13.14%	20,207
Carroll	4,069	57.61%	2,994	42.39%	1,075	15.22%	7,063
Carter	1,232	61.82%	761	38.18%	471	23.64%	1,993
Cass	6,658	64.50%	3,665	35.50%	2,993	29.00%	10,323
Cedar	2,247	47.56%	2,478	52.44%	-231	-4.88%	4,725
Chariton	3,862	66.66%	1,932	33.34%	1,930	33.32%	5,794
Christian	2,646	45.02%	3,232	54.98%	-586	-9.96%	5,878
Clark	2,223	57.25%	1,660	42.75%	563	14.50%	3,883
Clay	23,993	63.16%	13,997	36.84%	9,996	26.32%	37,990
Clinton	3,598	66.65%	1,800	33.35%	1,798	33.30%	5,398
Cole	8,127	44.67%	10,068	55.33%	-1,941	-10.66%	18,195
Cooper	4,201	54.34%	3,530	45.66%	671	8.68%	7,731
Crawford	3,444	56.42%	2,660	43.58%	784	12.84%	6,104
Dade	1,641	45.94%	1,931	54.06%	-290	-8.12%	3,572
Dallas	1,983	46.65%	2,268	53.35%	-285	-6.70%	4,251
Daviess	2,739	59.38%	1,874	40.62%	865	18.76%	4,613
DeKalb	2,347	58.30%	1,679	41.70%	668	16.60%	4,026
Dent	2,860	61.53%	1,788	38.47%	1,072	23.06%	4,648
Douglas	1,593	41.13%	2,280	58.87%	-687	-17.74%	3,873
Dunklin	8,467	70.96%	3,465	29.04%	5,002	41.92%	11,932
Franklin	13,464	61.83%	8,313	38.17%	5,151	23.66%	21,777
Gasconade	2,126	36.67%	3,672	63.33%	-1,546	-26.66%	5,798
Gentry	3,198	65.60%	1,677	34.40%	1,521	31.20%	4,875
Greene	30,130	55.67%	23,989	44.33%	6,141	11.34%	54,119
Grundy	3,363	58.24%	2,411	41.76%	952	16.48%	5,774
Harrison	2,787	52.56%	2,516	47.44%	271	5.11%	5,303
Henry	5,761	65.14%	3,083	34.86%	2,678	30.28%	8,844
Hickory	854	42.47%	1,157	57.53%	-303	-15.06%	2,011
Holt	1,871	52.02%	1,726	47.98%	145	4.04%	3,597
Howard	3,507	72.37%	1,339	27.63%	2,168	44.74%	4,846
Howell	4,968	51.75%	4,632	48.25%	336	3.50%	9,600
Iron	2,730	72.22%	1,050	27.78%	1,680	44.44%	3,780
Jackson	161,290	67.19%	78,766	32.81%	82,524	34.38%	240,056
Jasper	18,045	53.82%	15,481	46.18%	2,564	7.64%	33,526
Jefferson	18,916	70.57%	7,887	29.43%	11,029	41.14%	26,803
Johnson	6,412	59.59%	4,348	40.41%	2,064	19.18%	10,760
Knox	2,085	61.50%	1,305	38.50%	780	23.00%	3,390
Laclede	4,517	54.00%	3,848	46.00%	669	8.00%	8,365
Lafayette	7,400	57.40%	5,493	42.60%	1,907	14.80%	12,893
Lawrence	6,383	51.35%	6,047	48.65%	336	2.70%	12,430
Lewis	3,281	72.59%	1,239	27.41%	2,042	45.18%	4,520
Lincoln	4,993	68.74%	2,271	31.26%	2,722	37.48%	7,264
Linn	5,735	66.55%	2,883	33.45%	2,852	33.10%	8,618
Livingston	5,320	66.31%	2,703	33.69%	2,617	32.62%	8,023
Macon	5,389	65.51%	2,837	34.49%	2,552	31.02%	8,226
Madison	2,718	60.75%	1,756	39.25%	962	21.50%	4,474
Maries	2,063	63.56%	1,183	36.44%	880	27.12%	3,246
Marion	8,314	69.75%	3,605	30.25%	4,709	39.50%	11,919
McDonald	3,488	53.31%	3,055	46.69%	433	6.62%	6,543
Mercer	1,284	55.25%	1,040	44.75%	244	10.50%	2,324
Miller	2,858	43.03%	3,784	56.97%	-926	-13.94%	6,642
Mississippi	4,015	70.69%	1,665	29.31%	2,350	41.38%	5,680
Moniteau	2,624	48.76%	2,758	51.24%	-134	-2.48%	5,382
Monroe	4,103	81.55%	928	18.45%	3,175	63.10%	5,031
Montgomery	3,289	55.76%	2,610	44.24%	679	11.52%	5,899
Morgan	2,468	47.37%	2,742	52.63%	-274	-5.26%	5,210
New Madrid	7,415	74.16%	2,583	25.84%	4,832	48.32%	9,998
Newton	8,139	55.00%	6,660	45.00%	1,479	10.00%	14,799
Nodaway	6,690	63.84%	3,789	36.16%	2,901	27.68%	10,479
Oregon	2,908	74.56%	992	25.44%	1,916	49.12%	3,900
Osage	2,608	49.02%	2,712	50.98%	-104	-1.96%	5,320
Ozark	1,064	40.86%	1,540	59.14%	-476	-18.28%	2,604
Pemiscot	5,083	65.66%	2,658	34.34%	2,425	31.32%	7,741
Perry	3,456	54.92%	2,837	45.08%	619	9.84%	6,293
Pettis	8,987	62.43%	5,409	37.57%	3,578	24.86%	14,396
Phelps	5,776	60.60%	3,755	39.40%	2,021	21.20%	9,531
Pike	5,273	73.06%	1,944	26.94%	3,329	46.12%	7,217
Platte	6,143	66.76%	3,059	33.24%	3,084	33.52%	9,202
Polk	3,353	50.49%	3,288	49.51%	65	0.98%	6,641
Pulaski	3,383	64.57%	1,856	35.43%	1,527	29.14%	5,239
Putnam	1,484	48.96%	1,547	51.04%	-63	-2.08%	3,031
Ralls	2,847	79.46%	736	20.54%	2,111	58.92%	3,583
Randolph	6,988	73.77%	2,485	26.23%	4,503	47.54%	9,473
Ray	5,189	74.95%	1,734	25.05%	3,455	49.90%	6,923
Reynolds	1,835	77.59%	530	22.41%	1,305	55.18%	2,365
Ripley	2,688	61.48%	1,684	38.52%	1,004	22.96%	4,372
St. Charles	14,530	61.70%	9,020	38.30%	5,510	23.40%	23,550
St. Clair	2,593	56.94%	1,961	43.06%	632	13.88%	4,554
St. Francois	10,567	65.00%	5,690	35.00%	4,877	30.00%	16,257
St. Louis	213,658	61.29%	134,962	38.71%	78,696	22.58%	348,620
St. Louis City	207,958	77.72%	59,604	22.28%	148,354	55.44%	267,562
Ste. Genevieve	3,768	74.11%	1,316	25.89%	2,452	48.22%	5,084
Saline	7,308	66.78%	3,635	33.22%	3,673	33.56%	10,943
Schuyler	1,449	57.48%	1,072	42.52%	377	14.96%	2,521
Scotland	2,187	64.29%	1,215	35.71%	972	28.58%	3,402
Scott	7,512	70.05%	3,212	29.95%	4,300	40.10%	10,724
Shannon	2,312	71.89%	904	28.11%	1,408	43.78%	3,216
Shelby	3,156	72.25%	1,212	27.75%	1,944	44.50%	4,368
Stoddard	5,944	66.35%	3,014	33.65%	2,930	32.70%	8,958
Stone	1,835	43.57%	2,377	56.43%	-542	-12.86%	4,212
Sullivan	2,695	56.77%	2,052	43.23%	643	13.54%	4,747
Taney	2,544	48.14%	2,741	51.86%	-197	-3.72%	5,285
Texas	4,934	62.97%	2,902	37.03%	2,032	25.94%	7,836
Vernon	5,958	65.94%	3,077	34.06%	2,881	31.88%	9,035
Warren	1,903	45.03%	2,323	54.97%	-420	-9.94%	4,226
Washington	3,908	63.09%	2,286	36.91%	1,622	26.18%	6,194
Wayne	3,005	59.81%	2,019	40.19%	986	19.62%	5,024
Webster	3,824	53.37%	3,341	46.63%	483	6.74%	7,165
Worth	1,373	62.30%	831	37.70%	542	24.60%	2,204
Wright	3,292	48.71%	3,466	51.29%	-174	-2.58%	6,758
Totals	1,164,344	64.05%	653,535	35.95%	510,809	28.10%	1,817,879

==== Counties that flipped from Republican to Democratic ====
- Adair
- Atchison
- Andrew
- Barry
- Barton
- Bates
- Bollinger
- Buchanan
- Butler
- Caldwell
- Cape Girardeau
- Carroll
- Carter
- Cass
- Clark
- Clay
- Clinton
- Cooper
- Crawford
- Daviess
- DeKalb
- Dent
- Dunklin
- Franklin
- Grundy
- Greene
- Gentry
- Henry
- Harrison
- Holt
- Howell
- Iron
- Jasper
- Johnson
- Knox
- Laclede
- Lafayette
- Lawrence
- Linn
- Livingston
- Macon
- Madison
- McDonald
- Mercer
- Montgomery
- Newton
- Nodaway
- Oregon
- Pettis
- Phelps
- Perry
- Reynolds
- Polk
- Pulaski
- Ripley
- St. Clair
- St. Francois
- Schuyler
- Scotland
- Saline
- Stoddard
- Shannon
- Sullivan
- Texas
- Vernon
- Washington
- Webster
- Wayne
- Worth

==== Counties that flipped from Democratic to Republican ====
- Osage

== See also ==
- United States presidential elections in Missouri
