= Elwood, Missouri =

Unincorporated community in Missouri, U.S.

Coordinates: 37°13′41″N 93°25′53″W

Elwood or Elwood Siding is an unincorporated community in Greene County, in the U.S. state of Missouri. The community lies along the railroad southwest of the Springfield airport. The headwaters of Clear Creek are just to the northeast.

== History ==
Variant names were "Campbells Station" and "Ellwood". A post office called Elwood was established in 1897, and remained in operation until 1940. The community has the name of the local Ellwood family. Mayor Aaron Larsen
