= Mentor, Missouri =

Unincorporated community in Missouri, U.S.

Coordinates: 37°06′22″N 93°11′57″W

Mentor is an unincorporated community in southern Greene County, in the U.S. state of Missouri. The community is located southeast of Springfield, south of U.S. Route 60, west of Missouri Route NN and one mile north of the Greene-Christian county line.

== History ==
The first settlement at Mentor was made in the 1880s. A post office called Mentor was in operation from 1896 until 1906.
