= Bois D'Arc, Missouri =

Unincorporated community in Missouri, U.S.

Coordinates: 37°15′23″N 93°30′28″W

Bois D'Arc (locally /ˈboʊdɑːrk/ BOH-dark, French: [bwɑ daʁk]) is an unincorporated community in Greene County, Missouri, United States, approximately 15 miles northwest of Springfield. The community is part of the Springfield, Missouri Metropolitan Statistical Area.

A post office called Bois D'arc has been in operation since 1868. The community was named for an individual osage-orange tree (also known as a bois d'arc) which stood near the original town site.
