= Ebenezer, Missouri =

Unincorporated community in Missouri, U.S.

Coordinates: 37°20′25″N 93°18′26″W

Ebenezer is an unincorporated community in Greene County, Missouri, United States. It lies two miles north of McDaniel Lake north of Springfield and 1.25 miles east of Route 13. The community is at the head of the King Branch of the North Dry Sac River.

Ebenezer was settled by the pioneering movement of the early 1800s, the "Oldest Village in Greene County". Throughout the country a church, school or meeting house was the cornerstone of every community. It was no different here at Ebenezer. In 1832, the meeting house was built, the fourth west of St. Louis. The meeting house was (built) "equidistant from two springs about 100-yards apart, and there a campground was established in 1836 and camp meetings were held there annually. A post office called Ebenezer was established in 1866, and remained in operation until 1901. Ebenezer was the town in the vicinity of Evans Station on the Butterfield Overland Mail Route 1858-1861 period. A fresh set of horses were changed and the Stagecoach was now 134 miles from Tipton. From there a brief run of nine miles then brought the mail and passengers into Springfield Any passengers could buy a ticket as far as Saint Louis or San Francisco as well as places in between for 10 cents a mile. Ebenezer is a name of biblical origin, appearing in I Samuel 7:12.
