= Ken Gables =

American baseball player (1919–1960)

- Pitcher
- Born: January 31, 1919; Walnut Grove, Missouri, U.S.
- Died: January 2, 1960 (aged 40); Walnut Grove, Missouri, U.S.
- Batted: Right Threw: Right

MLB debut
- April 18, 1945, for the Pittsburgh Pirates

Last MLB appearance
- April 20, 1947, for the Pittsburgh Pirates

MLB statistics
- Win–loss record: 13–11
- Earned run average: 4.69
- Strikeouts: 88
- Stats at Baseball Reference

Teams
- Pittsburgh Pirates (1945–1947)

Kenneth Harlin Gables (January 31, 1919 – January 2, 1960) was a Major League Baseball pitcher for the Pittsburgh Pirates from 1945 to 1947. The right-hander stood 5 ft 11 in (1.80 m) and weighed 210 lb (95 kg).

Gables interrupted his time in the minor leagues when he served in the US Army during World War II.

As a rookie in 1945, 26-year-old Gables was the youngest pitcher on the Pirate staff. He made his major league debut in relief on April 18, 1945 against the Cincinnati Reds at Crosley Field. He earned his first win on May 24, also in relief, in an 11-inning home game against the Boston Braves. Gables pitched in 29 games during his first season, 16 as a starter, and had an 11–7 record with a 4.15 earned run average.

Gables' career totals for 62 games include a 13–11 record, 23 games started, 6 complete games, 20 games finished, and 2 saves. He allowed 125 earned runs in 239 2/3 innings pitched for an ERA of 4.69.

Gables died in his hometown of Walnut Grove, Missouri, at the age of 40.

== Trivia ==
- Gables gave up just 9 home runs in 239 2/3 innings, an outstanding average of just one per 26.2 innings pitched.
- His nickname was "Coral."
- Five other players made their major league debut the same day as Gables: Vic Lombardi, Otho Nitcholas, Bill Salkeld, Jim Wilson, and Jose Zardon.
