= Haseltine, Missouri =

Unincorporated community in Missouri, U.S.

Coordinates: 37°12′34″N 93°23′10″W

Haseltine is an unincorporated community in Greene County, in the U.S. state of Missouri. The community location was west of Springfield on U.S. Route 266, adjacent to Interstate 44.

== History ==
Variant names were "Dorchester" and "Hazeltine Station". A post office called Dorchester was established in 1881, and remained in operation until 1904. The community has the name of the local Hazeltine family.
