= Turners, Missouri =

Unincorporated community in Missouri, U.S.

Coordinates: 37°10′51″N 93°09′20″W

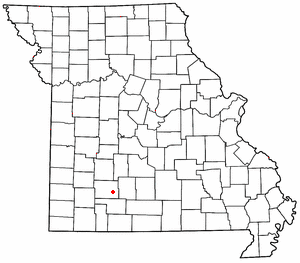
The location of Turners in Missouri.

Turners or Turner is a small Unincorporated community located in Greene County, Missouri, United States. It lies on the southeast side of the James River floodplain, approximately 3.5 miles east of U.S. Route 65 in east Springfield.

The community lies at the intersection of Routes D and J near the confluence of Turner Creek with the James River. The old St. Louis–San Francisco Railway (currently the BNSF Railway) passed through the community.

A post office called Turners has been in operation since 1889. The community carries the surname of an original owner of the site.
