= Hackney (surname) =

Hackney is an English medieval surname from the village (now London borough) of Hackney.

Notable persons with the surname Hackney include:

== By given name ==
- Alan Hackney (1924–2009), British screenwriter
- Clarence Hackney (1894–1941), Scottish-American professional golfer
- Darrell Hackney (born 1983), American football quarterback
- Duane D. Hackney (1947–1993), United States Air Force Pararescueman, who was the most decorated airman in USAF history
- Jeffrey Hackney (born 1941), legal academic and former Fellow of Wadham College, Oxford
- Joe Hackney (born 1945), North Carolina politician
- Keith Hackney (born 1958), retired American martial arts fighter
- Leonard Hackney (1855–1938), Justice of the Indiana Supreme Court
- Mabel Hackney (1872–1914), British actress
- Pearl Hackney (1916–2009), British actress
- Rod Hackney (born 1942), British architect
- Sheldon Hackney (1933–2013), American educator
- Simon Hackney (born 1984), English professional football player
- Thomas Hackney (1861–1946), U.S. Representative from Missouri
- David Hackney (born 1965), representative in the Washington State Legislator
- Hayden Hackney (born 2002), Current Middlesbrough F.C Football Player
