= Avalon Park, Missouri =

Unincorporated community in Missouri, U.S.

Coordinates: 37°19′34″N 93°15′46″W

Avalon Park is an unincorporated community in Greene County, in the U.S. state of Missouri.

The community took its name from the mythological island of Avalon.
