= Glidewell (surname) =

Glidewell is an English surname. Notable people with the surname include:

- Alésia Glidewell (born 1978), American web series director, producer and voice actress
- Iain Glidewell (1924–2016), Lord Justice of Appeal, Judge of Appeal of the High Court of the Isle of Man, and Privy Councillor
