= Springfield-Greene County Library =

Library system in Missouri, United States

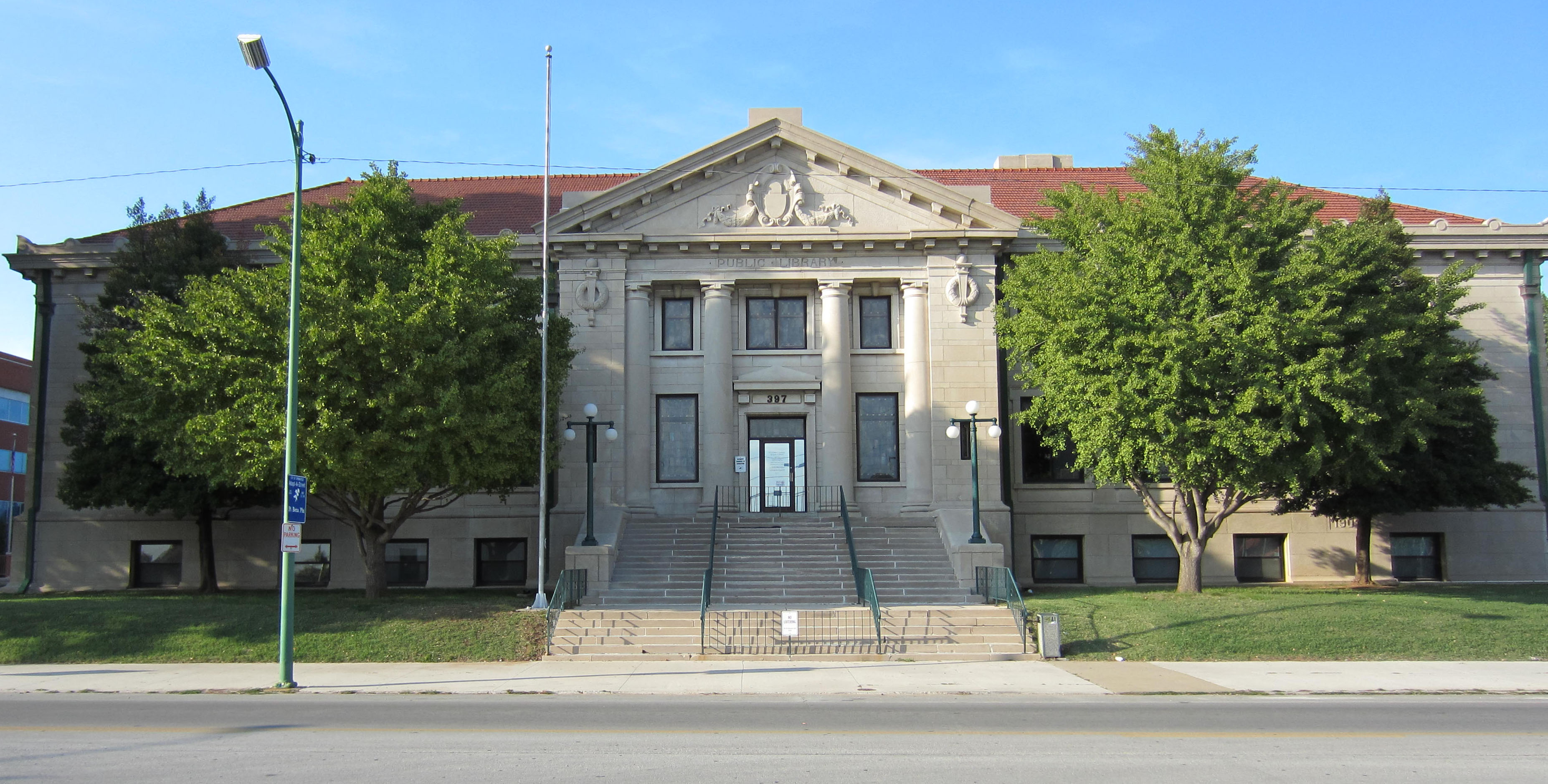
- Midtown Carnegie Branch Library
- Location: Springfield, MO, United States
- Type: Public
- Established: March 12, 1905
- Branches: 10

Collection
- Size: 391,028

Access and use
- Circulation: 2,716,011
- Population served: 2,001,226

Other information
- Budget: $20,698,467 (2026-2027)
- Director: Ed Walton
- Website: www.thelibrary.org

Springfield-Greene County Library District (SGCL) is a library system that operates in both Springfield, Missouri and Greene County, Missouri. Springfield and Greene County Libraries operated as separate entities until 1961, when the Greene County Library board began contracting services from the Springfield Public Library. Boards from both the Springfield Public Library and the Greene County Library decided that it would be more effective to operate as one entity and merged in 1971 becoming the Springfield-Greene County Library District.

The first library in the district was built with a grant from Andrew Carnegie in 1905 and served as the main district library until 1999 when the Library Center opened to accommodate district growth. The district is governed by a nine-member board of directors. Five of the members are appointed by the Springfield Mayor and the other four are appointed by the Greene County Commission for county representation.

The district is funded primarily through county property taxes, grants, private gifts and funds from The Library Foundation along with proceeds from two semi-annual books sales by the Friends of the Library.

== History ==
The Springfield Public Library opened on March 12, 1905, in a Carnegie-funded building at 397 E. Central with a collection of 700 volumes and a single staff member. The original building was expanded in 1937 through a Works Progress Administration project to accommodate growing public use. During the mid-twentieth century, library service expanded beyond Springfield with the establishment of the Greene County Library in 1951 and the introduction of a bookmobile service in 1955. The Ash Grove City Library joined the Greene County Library system in 1956, and additional branches opened in Republic and other communities as library services expanded throughout the county.

In 1971, the Springfield Public Library and Greene County Library merged to form the Springfield-Greene County Library District, creating a unified public library system for Springfield and Greene County. During the following decades, the district expanded its branch network, introduced automated circulation and online catalog systems, launched its website in 1995, and opened larger regional facilities including the Library Center in 1999 and the Library Station in 2003. By the late 2000s, the district had continued to grow with new branches in Springfield, Strafford, Willard, and Republic while expanding digital services, wireless internet access, and outreach programming.

== Locations ==
The Springfield-Greene County Library District has 10 branches and a Mobile Library.

Five of the district's ten branches are located in Springfield these include:

- The Library Center
- Schweitzer Brentwood Branch Library
- The Library Station
- Midtown Carnegie Branch Library
- Park Central Branch Library

The other five branches are located throughout Greene County

- Ash Grove Branch Library
- Fair Grove Branch Library
- Republic Branch Library
- Strafford Branch Library
- Willard Branch Library

== Services ==
The Springfield–Greene County Library District provides free Wi-Fi, public computers, printing, meeting rooms, and study spaces at its branch libraries. The Library Center houses the district's Local History & Genealogy Department, which maintains collections and research resources related to Springfield, Greene County, and the Ozarks. The Midtown Carnegie Branch is home to The Edge Community Technology Center, which offers technology instruction, makerspace equipment, digital media production tools, and 3D printing. Additional makerspaces throughout the district provide access to creative technologies and hands-on learning opportunities.

In addition to traditional library collections, the district offers access to e-books, audiobooks, streaming media, research databases, language-learning platforms, and digital newspaper and magazine collections. Outreach services include the Mobile Library, which delivers library materials and programs throughout Springfield and Greene County, and Library Express self-service kiosks that allow patrons to check out and return materials outside normal branch hours.

== Programs ==
The Springfield-Greene County Library District offers educational, cultural, and recreational programming for children, teens, and adults throughout the year. Annual programs include the Summer Reading Program, which encourages reading and lifelong learning through activities, events, and reading challenges. Other key library initiatives feature the "Walking Books" delivery service for homebound residents, "Racing to Read" storytimes for area daycares, and tailored services for schools and memory care facilities. All of these services are funded through the Library Foundation. The district also offers technology classes, author events, book discussions, craft and maker programs, and other community events designed to support literacy, lifelong learning, and civic engagement.
