= Hackney, Missouri =

Unincorporated community in Missouri

Coordinates: 37°20′42″N 93°23′44″W

Hackney is an unincorporated community in northwest Greene County, in the U.S. state of Missouri. The community was a mill site on the north bank of a meander in the Little Sac River. The old iron Hackney Mill Bridge directly south of the community was constructed in 1895-96 and was replaced in 1996.

== History ==
A post office called Hackney was established in 1889, and remained in operation until 1905. The community was named after the proprietor of a local mill.
