= Glidewell, Missouri =

Unincorporated community in Missouri, U.S.

Coordinates: 37°18′16″N 93°19′38″W

Glidewell is an unincorporated community in Greene County, Missouri, United States.

Glidewell is located approximately four miles north of Springfield, just east of Missouri Route 13 on a county road that accesses McDaniel Lake on the Little Sac River.
