= City Utilities of Springfield =

City Utilities of Springfield (CU) is a community-owned utility serving southwest Missouri with electricity, natural gas, water, telecommunications and transit services. CU provides service to over 106,000 customers.

CU is responsible for the generation, transmission, and distribution of electric power; the acquisition, transportation, and distribution of natural gas; and the acquisition, treatment, and distribution of water; plus the operation of the bus transportation system. The CU service territory covers approximately 320 square miles (830 km^{2}), which includes all of the city of Springfield, portions of Greene County, and a part of northern Christian County.

The utility is owned by the community and governed by an eleven-member Board of Public Utilities, nine of whom are customers inside the city limits and two who reside outside the city limits. Board members are appointed by City Council for three-year terms. The Board normally meets on the last Thursday of each month. The Board makes policy decisions for CU and appoints the General Manager, who is the Chief Executive Officer. The City of Springfield acquired the former Missouri Gas and Electric from Federal Light and Traction, an affiliate of Cities Service, in 1945.
