= Walnut Grove R-V School District =

School district in Missouri, U.S.

Address
- 300 College Street Walnut Grove, Missouri, 65770; United States

District information
- Type: Public
- Grades: PreK–12
- NCES District ID: 2930990

Students and staff
- Students: 280
- Teachers: 24.11
- Staff: 4.8
- Student–teacher ratio: 11.61

Other information
- Website: www.wgtigers.com

Walnut Grove R-V School District is a school district headquartered in Walnut Grove, Missouri. It has an elementary school and a high school.

In October 2019 the district had 279 students in grades preschool through 12.

== History ==
In August 2019 54% of the voters rejected a tax levy meant to improve the school facility. In October 2019 the district made an attempt at passing a tax levy. 54% of the voters rejected this in November of that year.

In 2021 a vote to increase the tax levy failed on a 189-188 basis, which meant it failed by a single vote. A recount was scheduled for April 9.
