= Walnut Grove, Missouri =

- City
- Nickname: Possum Trot
- Location of Walnut Grove, Missouri
- Coordinates: 37°24′39″N 93°32′54″W
- Country: United States
- State: Missouri
- County: Greene

Government
  - Mayor: Jeffrey Kruger

Area
  - Total: 0.62 sq mi (1.61 km^{2})
  - Land: 0.62 sq mi (1.61 km^{2})
  - Water: 0 sq mi (0.00 km^{2})
- Elevation: 1,207 ft (368 m)

Population (2020)
  - Total: 652
  - Density: 1,050.5/sq mi (405.59/km^{2})
- Time zone: UTC-6 (Central (CST))
  - Summer (DST): UTC-5 (CDT)
- ZIP code: 65770
- Area code: 417
- FIPS code: 29-76840
- GNIS feature ID: 0735899
- Website: https://www.walnutgrovecity.com/

Walnut Grove is a city in Greene County, Missouri, United States. The population was 652 at the 2020 census. It is part of the Springfield, Missouri Metropolitan Statistical Area.

Claudette Riley of the Springfield News-Leader described it as "a largely agricultural community with a relatively low tax base."

== History ==
Walnut Grove was platted in 1859. It was named for the groves of wild black walnut trees growing near the original town site. The original name of the town was Possum Trot, referring to the multitude of possums in the area.

== Geography ==
Walnut Grove is located at 37°24′39″N 93°32′54″W (37.410728, -93.548305). According to the United States Census Bureau, the city has a total area of 0.62 square miles (1.61 km^{2}), all land.

It is 20 miles (32 km) north of Springfield, Missouri. In addition to Springfield, Bolivar has workers who live in Walnut Grove.

== Demographics ==
Historical population
Census	Pop.	Note	%±
1880	264		—
1920	403		—
1930	387		−4.0%
1940	310		−19.9%
1950	347		11.9%
1960	373		7.5%
1970	442		18.5%
1980	504		14.0%
1990	549		8.9%
2000	630		14.8%
2010	665		5.6%
2020	652		−2.0%
U.S. Decennial Census

Walnut Grove hosted an annual celebration in September called 'Possum Trot Days.' Generally, there was a town wide garage sale with various activities interspersed throughout the day at the community park. The town also annually celebrates bluegrass with a festival called 'Pickin' in the Park 'the second Saturday in June .

=== 2010 census ===
As of the census of 2010, there were 665 people, 274 households, and 184 families living in the city. The population density was 1,072.6 inhabitants per square mile (414.1/km^{2}). There were 306 housing units at an average density of 493.5 per square mile (190.5/km^{2}). The racial makeup of the city was 97.6% White, 0.2% African American, 1.4% Native American, and 0.9% from two or more races. Hispanic or Latino of any race were 0.8% of the population.

There were 274 households, of which 33.6% had children under the age of 18 living with them, 49.6% were married couples living together, 15.0% had a female householder with no husband present, 2.6% had a male householder with no wife present, and 32.8% were non-families. 28.1% of all households were made up of individuals, and 13.5% had someone living alone who was 65 years of age or older. The average household size was 2.43 and the average family size was 2.97.

The median age in the city was 35.9 years. 26% of residents were under the age of 18; 10.5% were between the ages of 18 and 24; 23.7% were from 25 to 44; 24.1% were from 45 to 64; and 15.9% were 65 years of age or older. The gender makeup of the city was 45.1% male and 54.9% female.

=== 2000 census ===
As of the census of 2000, there were 630 people, 264 households, and 165 families living in the city. The population density was 1,124.1 inhabitants per square mile (434.0/km^{2}). There were 290 housing units at an average density of 517.5 per square mile (199.8/km^{2}). The racial makeup of the city was 96.83% White, 2.38% Native American, 0.16% Asian, 0.32% from other races, and 0.32% from two or more races. Hispanic or Latino of any race were 0.48% of the population.

There were 264 households, out of which 33.0% had children under the age of 18 living with them, 50.4% were married couples living together, 9.5% had a female householder with no husband present, and 37.5% were non-families. 34.1% of all households were made up of individuals, and 21.2% had someone living alone who was 65 years of age or older. The average household size was 2.39 and the average family size was 3.08.

In the city the population was spread out, with 27.8% under the age of 18, 9.4% from 18 to 24, 27.9% from 25 to 44, 18.7% from 45 to 64, and 16.2% who were 65 years of age or older. The median age was 35 years. For every 100 females, there were 90.9 males. For every 100 females age 18 and over, there were 83.5 males.

The median income for a household in the city was $31,563, and the median income for a family was $39,688. Males had a median income of $29,297 versus $20,556 for females. The per capita income for the city was $16,019. About 7.4% of families and 12.8% of the population were below the poverty line, including 12.0% of those under age 18 and 20.8% of those age 65 or over.

== Economy ==
As of 2019 construction and screen printing companies are based in Walnut Grove.

== Education ==
Walnut Grove R-V School District is the local school district.

== Notable person ==
- Ken Gables (1919–1960), Pittsburgh Pirates pitcher, born and died in Walnut Grove
