= The Bus (Springfield, Missouri) =

Public transit system in Missouri

CU Transit (The Bus)
- Parent: City Utilities of Springfield
- Founded: 1945; 80 years ago
- Headquarters: 1505 N. Boonville Avenue
- Locale: Springfield, Missouri
- Service area: Springfield, Missouri
- Service type: bus service, paratransit
- Routes: 14
- Hubs: CU Transit Center
- Fleet: 33
- Annual ridership: 939,575 (total, 2022)
- Fuel type: Diesel and Electric
- Operator: CU Transit
- Chief executive: Gary Gibson
- Website: cutransit.net

The Bus, also referred to occasionally as CU Transit, is a public transit system in Springfield, Missouri, United States. The service is provided by the transit division of the City Utilities of Springfield, who also provide paratransit under the name Access Express.

== History ==
In 1945, Springfield City Council voted unanimously to purchase of the privately owned Springfield Gas and Electric Company, also the operator of the city transit system. This transaction created City Utilities and subsequently CU Transit. Springfield's transit system remains one of the few in the United States to be operated through a city utility company.

=== Transit centers ===
The Bus has had 2 transit centers in its lifetime. The first was built in 1981 on McDaniel Street and Patton Avenue. It operated from 1981 until May 9, 2016, where operations moved to the new transit center on College and Main. The first transit center was then abandoned until its demolition on March 29, 2017.

Talk about a new transit center began in the early 2000s, transit officials expressed the need for a new transit center due to lack of space, preventing expansion and being too small for buses themselves.

Planning begun in 2006 after the Federal Transit Administration provided $1.63 million for the new facility and $1.47 million in 2008. A site for the location on College and Main was chosen in September 2012 and bought in October of that year.

The new CU Transit Center, costing $4.4 million, had a ribbon cutting ceremony in the morning of May 6, 2016. The station began bus service starting with weekend service on May 8 and full weekday service operations on May 9. The introduction of the new transit center also brought a complete overhaul of the bus routes.

On November 14, 2022, Greyhound Lines moved all operations into the CU Transit Center.

== Fares ==
The bus operates on flat rate fare system that costs an adult $1.00 for a single ride with a 25-cent surcharge for transfers. Discounted fares are offered for youth passengers and those that are senior citizens, disabled, or have Medicare. Fares are also offered in bulk ticket books as well as daily, weekly, monthly, and semester passes. Fares can be paid through several payment methods:

- Token Transit, an app for Electronic tickets on public transit.
- Smart cards, obtainable via a Ticket-vending machine or the transit center
- On the bus itself (with cash)
- Physical ticket bought at transit center

Mobile Electronic tickets and Smart cards that could be bought at the transit center or with new Ticket-vending machines were introduced on February 23, 2018. Smart cards can only be used with 7 or 31 day passes in any fare tier, there is $1 fee for a smart card but they can be reloaded indefinitely.

== Routes ==
Name	Number	Color	Route Type
Dale	2	Lime	Day
Division	3	Orange	Day
Glenstone/National	5	Blue	Day
College	6	Black	Day
Campbell	7	Red	Day
Fort	9	Yellow	Day
National/Glenstone	12	Maroon	Day
Atlantic	14	Brown	Day
SW Loop	36	Pink	Day, Saturday & Evening
North Loop	38	Green	Day, Saturday & Evening
NE	22	Lime	Saturday & Evening, Sunday & Holiday
SE	25	Blue	Saturday & Evening, Sunday & Holiday
NW	26	Black	Saturday & Evening, Sunday & Holiday
SW	27	Red	Saturday & Evening, Sunday & Holiday

== Fleet and Depot ==
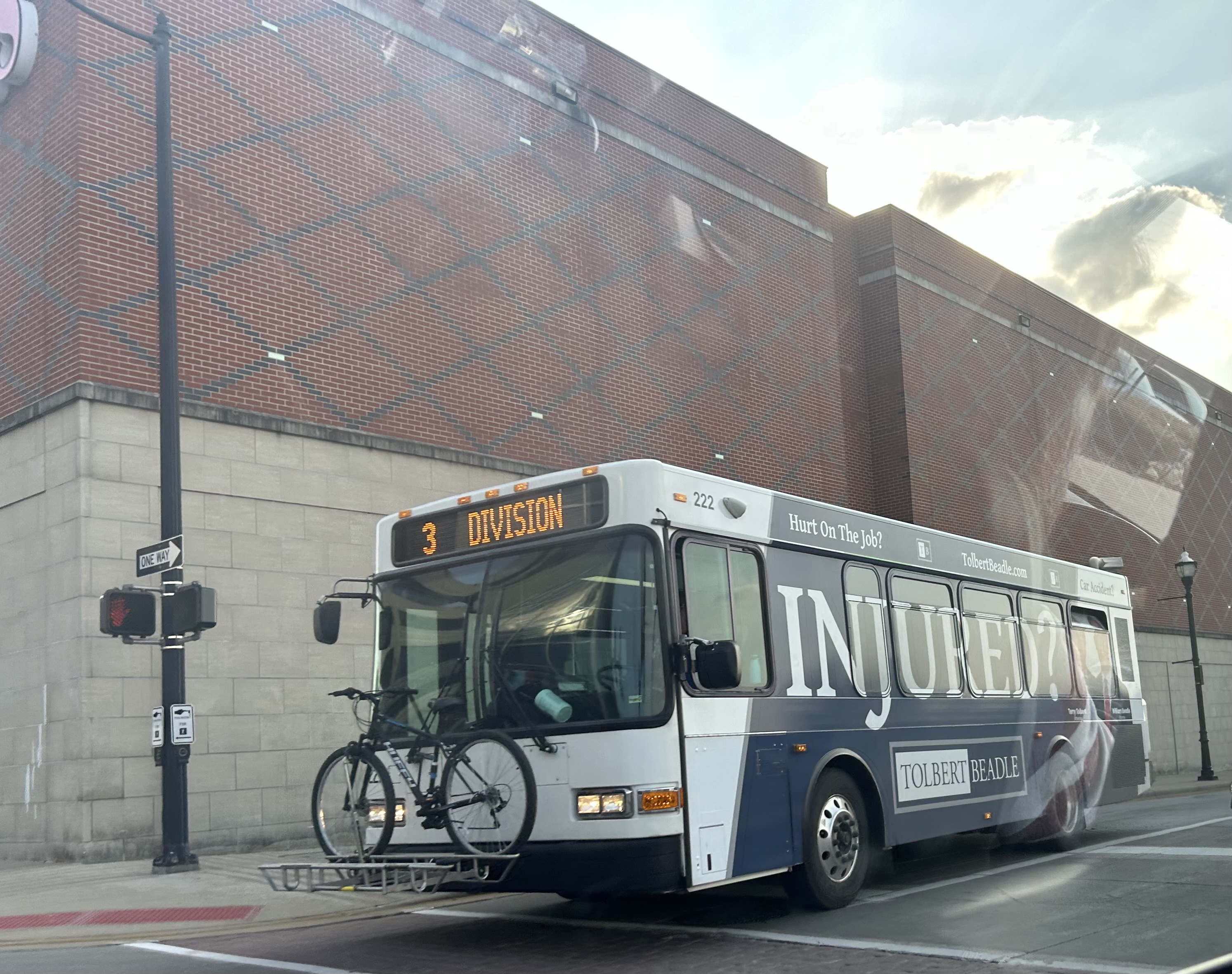
2013 Gillig low floor diesel bus #222 in Springfield, Missouri on the 3-Division-Orange route.

City Utilities currently owns a total of 33 buses. This consists of 31 buses in the active fleet and two buses in the contingency fleet.

All buses operate out of the City Utilities Vehicle Maintenance building, once used by Springfield Traction Company streetcars.

Active Fixed Route Fleet
Manufacture	Year	Fuel type	Quantity
Gillig	2013	Diesel	10
Gillig	2018	Diesel	11
Gillig	2019	Diesel	2
Gillig	2021	Electric Battery	2

Contingency Fixed Route Fleet
Manufacture	Year	Fuel type	Quantity
Gillig	2002	Diesel	2

Active Paratransit Fleet
Manufacture	Year	Fuel type	Quantity
ARBOC	2014	Diesel	2
ARBOC	2016	Diesel	4
