= Ash Grove, Missouri =

City in Green County, Missouri, United States

- City
- Location of Ash Grove, Missouri
- Coordinates: 37°18′56″N 93°35′2″W
- Country: United States
- State: Missouri
- County: Greene

Area
  - Total: 1.33 sq mi (3.44 km^{2})
  - Land: 1.33 sq mi (3.44 km^{2})
  - Water: 0 sq mi (0.00 km^{2})
- Elevation: 1,047 ft (319 m)

Population (2020)
  - Total: 1,512
  - Density: 1,138.3/sq mi (439.49/km^{2})
- Time zone: UTC-6 (Central (CST))
  - Summer (DST): UTC-5 (CDT)
- ZIP code: 65604
- Area code: 417
- FIPS code: 29-02188
- GNIS feature ID: 0713418
- Website: ashgrovemo.gov

Ash Grove is a city in Greene County, Missouri, United States. The population was 1,512 at the 2020 census. It is part of the Springfield, Missouri Metropolitan Statistical Area.

== History ==
Ash Grove was laid out in 1853. The city was named from a grove of ash trees near the original town site. A post office called Ash Grove has been in operation since 1849.

Berry Cemetery, Gilmore Barn, and the Nathan and Olive Boone Homestead State Historic Site, are listed on the National Register of Historic Places.

== Geography ==
Ash Grove is located at 37°18′56″N 93°35′2″W (37.315629, -93.583829).

According to the United States Census Bureau, the city has a total area of 1.22 square miles (3.16 km^{2}), all land.

The city is located approximately twenty miles northwest of Springfield, the state's third-largest city.

== Demographics ==
Historical population
Census	Pop.	Note	%±
1880	500		—
1890	1,350		170.0%
1900	1,039		−23.0%
1910	1,075		3.5%
1920	1,000		−7.0%
1930	1,107		10.7%
1940	1,101		−0.5%
1950	970		−11.9%
1960	886		−8.7%
1970	934		5.4%
1980	1,157		23.9%
1990	1,128		−2.5%
2000	1,430		26.8%
2010	1,472		2.9%
2020	1,512		2.7%
U.S. Decennial Census

=== 2020 census ===
As of the 2020 census, Ash Grove had a population of 1,512. The median age was 39.3 years. 25.2% of residents were under the age of 18 and 22.2% of residents were 65 years of age or older. For every 100 females there were 85.1 males, and for every 100 females age 18 and over there were 75.9 males age 18 and over.

0.0% of residents lived in urban areas, while 100.0% lived in rural areas.

There were 589 households in Ash Grove, of which 35.7% had children under the age of 18 living in them. Of all households, 45.8% were married-couple households, 15.1% were households with a male householder and no spouse or partner present, and 31.1% were households with a female householder and no spouse or partner present. About 31.4% of all households were made up of individuals and 16.1% had someone living alone who was 65 years of age or older.

There were 655 housing units, of which 10.1% were vacant. The homeowner vacancy rate was 2.4% and the rental vacancy rate was 7.9%.

Racial composition as of the 2020 census
Race	Number	Percent
White	1,403	92.8%
Black or African American	2	0.1%
American Indian and Alaska Native	12	0.8%
Asian	0	0.0%
Native Hawaiian and Other Pacific Islander	1	0.1%
Some other race	11	0.7%
Two or more races	83	5.5%
Hispanic or Latino (of any race)	41	2.7%

=== 2010 census ===
As of the census of 2010, there were 1,472 people, 584 households, and 379 families living in the city. The population density was 1,206.6 inhabitants per square mile (465.9/km^{2}). There were 661 housing units at an average density of 541.8 per square mile (209.2/km^{2}). The racial makeup of the city was 97.4% White, 0.1% African American, 0.6% Native American, 0.1% Asian, 0.2% from other races, and 1.6% from two or more races. Hispanic or Latino of any race were 1.8% of the population.

There were 584 households, of which 33.9% had children under the age of 18 living with them, 47.8% were married couples living together, 12.2% had a female householder with no husband present, 5.0% had a male householder with no wife present, and 35.1% were non-families. 31.5% of all households were made up of individuals, and 15.9% had someone living alone who was 65 years of age or older. The average household size was 2.39 and the average family size was 2.96.

The median age in the city was 41.5 years. 24.3% of residents were under the age of 18; 7.2% were between the ages of 18 and 24; 22.6% were from 25 to 44; 25.7% were from 45 to 64; and 20.2% were 65 years of age or older. The gender makeup of the city was 46.8% male and 53.2% female.

=== 2000 census ===
As of the census of 2000, there were 1,430 people, 577 households, and 386 families living in the city. The population density was 1,204.1 inhabitants per square mile (464.9/km^{2}). There were 626 housing units at an average density of 527.1 per square mile (203.5/km^{2}). The racial makeup of the city was 97.69% White, 0.07% African American, 1.05% Native American, 0.07% Asian, 0.42% from other races, and 0.70% from two or more races. Hispanic or Latino of any race were 0.49% of the population.

There were 577 households, out of which 33.8% had children under the age of 18 living with them, 54.9% were married couples living together, 8.1% had a female householder with no husband present, and 33.1% were non-families. 28.8% of all households were made up of individuals, and 16.1% had someone living alone who was 65 years of age or older. The average household size was 2.48 and the average family size was 3.08.

In the city the population was spread out, with 27.7% under the age of 18, 7.9% from 18 to 24, 26.8% from 25 to 44, 21.6% from 45 to 64, and 16.0% who were 65 years of age or older. The median age was 37 years. For every 100 females, there were 94.3 males. For every 100 females age 18 and over, there were 85.0 males.

The median income for a household in the city was $31,250, and the median income for a family was $39,318. Males had a median income of $28,750 versus $20,329 for females. The per capita income for the city was $15,548. About 9.1% of families and 13.4% of the population were below the poverty line, including 15.2% of those under age 18 and 15.2% of those age 65 or over.

== Notable people ==
- Ma Barker (1873–1935), mother of several gang leaders
- Nathan Boone (1780–1856), soldier; son of Daniel Boone
- Joseph Yoakum (1891–1972), outsider artist

== See also ==
- List of cities in Missouri
