= Rogersville, Missouri =

City in Webster and Greene counties in Missouri, United States

- City
- Location of Rogersville, Missouri
- Coordinates: 37°7′3″N 93°3′29″W
- Country: United States
- State: Missouri
- Counties: Webster, Greene

Area
  - Total: 3.75 sq mi (9.70 km^{2})
  - Land: 3.75 sq mi (9.70 km^{2})
  - Water: 0 sq mi (0.00 km^{2})
- Elevation: 1,460 ft (445 m)

Population (2020)
  - Total: 3,897
  - Density: 1,040.5/sq mi (401.74/km^{2})
- Time zone: UTC-6 (CDT)
  - Summer (DST): UTC-5 (Central (CST))
- ZIP code: 65742
- Area code: 417
- FIPS code: 29-62894
- GNIS feature ID: 0725537
- Website: rogersvillemo.org

Rogersville is a city in Greene and Webster counties in Missouri, United States, and is part of the Springfield, Missouri Metropolitan Area. As of the 2020 census, its population was 3,897.

== History ==
Rogersville was named after Isaac Rogers, a physician and pioneer settler. A post office called Rogersville has been in operation since 1882. The Citizens Bank of Rogersville was formed as a corporation on December 15, 1908, with $10,000 in capital stock.

The history of Rogersville has been documented by the Citizens Bank of Rogersville and is shown below.

The largest settlement in this area in the mid 1800s was Henderson, with a population of about 300. Henderson was located 16 miles east of Springfield in a valley, by a stream and on the mail highway. It was a perfect place for a town.

In 1882, the Kansas City and Memphis Railroad came through two miles to the south of Henderson. When it became known that a depot was to be erected, a young physician, Isaac Rogers, agreed to donate $50 to defray the expense of surveying and laying out lots and streets if they would use his name for the settlement. The original survey was done by J.J. Watts.

The first postmaster was appointed in September 1882. Five rural carriers began in 1904 using horse and buggy. The population of Rogersville had grown to 450. School was held in the blacksmith shop in 1884. A community church, which housed a lodge hall on the second story, was built in 1885. A newspaper, The Rogersville Record, obtained a "second class matter permit" at the post office in October 1915. The first bank opened in 1890 but failed during the Depression. The Citizens Bank of Rogersville was chartered in 1908. Rogersville was incorporated as a village in 1916. Some street lights were operating as early as 1927. In 1932, US Highway 60 was paved through town.

There is no city, village or hamlet named "Logan." The Logan family donated the land on Farm Road 164, for the Logan Elementary School, built in 1955. In 1965, the K-8 Logan School District in southeast Greene County consolidated with the Rogersville School District in Webster County, and the combined entity became known as the Logan-Rogersville School District.

There is, however, the Logan Cemetery about a half mile west of the Logan Elementary School on Farm Road 219 and also the old Crossroad Store at the intersection of Farm Roads 164 and 219. This area is generally known as Logan.

Around late 1929 or early 1930, the Bank of Rogersville was robbed by two men who stole $981. About a dozen men rode out to chase the robbers, one of which was shot and the other was captured. The trial was held in the Rogersville High School gym for the captured robber, and he was sentenced to jail.

In 1957, a fire was discovered in a vacant building in Rogersville on a Saturday night around 10:30 p.m., which burned out of control due to Rogersville having no fire-fighting equipment or a city water supply. Calls for aid were sent out to surrounding communities including the Fordland Air Force Station, the Seymour Volunteer Fire Department, the Ozark Rural Fire Department, and the Marshfield Department. Four businesses were destroyed, including a market and a new theater, with damages estimated at $75,000.

In 1992, the Webster County Council on Aging formed a "Senior Services Committee" to address the needs of its senior citizens. In 1993, the committee decided to ask for a 5-cent tax increase to extend services on the August ballot, but the issue failed. In 1994, a forum was held with the assistance of the Southwest Missouri Office on Aging (SMOA) to discuss the possibility of a Rogersville Senior Center. A temporary center was formed in May 1994, and after fundraising events and community donations, the Rogersville Senior Center opened on January 17, 1995.

Rogersville was formerly known as the "Raccoon Capital of the World".

== Geography ==
According to the United States Census Bureau, the city has a total area of 3.44 square miles (8.91 km^{2}), all land.

== Demographics ==
Historical population
Census	Pop.	Note	%±
1920	408		—
1930	461		13.0%
1940	430		−6.7%
1950	321		−25.3%
1960	447		39.3%
1970	595		33.1%
1980	741		24.5%
1990	995		34.3%
2000	1,508		51.6%
2010	3,073		103.8%
2020	3,897		26.8%
U.S. Decennial Census

Rogersville is part of the Springfield, Missouri Metropolitan Area.

=== 2020 census ===
As of the 2020 census, Rogersville had a population of 3,897. The median age was 29.7 years. 30.1% of residents were under the age of 18 and 9.7% of residents were 65 years of age or older. For every 100 females there were 96.6 males, and for every 100 females age 18 and over there were 89.2 males age 18 and over.

0.0% of residents lived in urban areas, while 100.0% lived in rural areas.

There were 1,442 households in Rogersville, of which 44.5% had children under the age of 18 living in them. Of all households, 51.9% were married-couple households, 13.2% were households with a male householder and no spouse or partner present, and 26.9% were households with a female householder and no spouse or partner present. About 23.3% of all households were made up of individuals and 9.2% had someone living alone who was 65 years of age or older.

There were 1,533 housing units, of which 5.9% were vacant. The homeowner vacancy rate was 0.9% and the rental vacancy rate was 7.9%.

Racial composition as of the 2020 census
Race	Number	Percent
White	3,487	89.5%
Black or African American	21	0.5%
American Indian and Alaska Native	34	0.9%
Asian	17	0.4%
Native Hawaiian and Other Pacific Islander	1	0.0%
Some other race	39	1.0%
Two or more races	298	7.6%
Hispanic or Latino (of any race)	163	4.2%

=== Income and poverty ===
The median household income was $48,218 in the city. 16.5% of residents were classified in poverty, 26.2% of residents held a Bachelor's degree or higher, and 67.7% of residents were employed.

=== Demographic estimates ===
A Census Bureau profile reported 1,309 families in the city, an average household size of 3.67, an average family size of 3.06, and 8.3% of residents under the age of 5.

=== 2010 census ===
As of the census of 2010, there were 3,073 people, 1,138 households, and 833 families residing in the city. The population density was 893.3 inhabitants per square mile (344.9/km^{2}). There were 1,240 housing units at an average density of 360.5 per square mile (139.2/km^{2}). The racial makeup of the city was 95.0% White, 0.4% African American, 0.7% Native American, 0.4% Asian, 0.1% Pacific Islander, 0.7% from other races, and 2.7% from two or more races. Hispanic or Latino of any race were 3.5% of the population.

There were 1,138 households, of which 46.5% had children under the age of 18 living with them, 53.0% were married couples living together, 15.1% had a female householder with no spouse present, 5.1% had a male householder with no spouse present, and 26.8% were non-families. 21.8% of all households were made up of individuals, and 8.2% had someone living alone who was 65 years of age or older. The average household size was 2.70 and the average family size was 3.16.

The median age in the city was 29.8 years. 33.2% of residents were under the age of 18, 8.3% were between the ages of 18 and 24, 31.9% were from 25 to 44, 17.6% were from 45 to 64, and 8.9% were 65 years of age or older. The gender makeup of the city was 48.6% male and 51.4% female.

=== 2000 census ===
As of the census of 2000, there were 1,508 people, 583 households, and 409 families residing in the city. The population density was 1,318.4 inhabitants per square mile (509.0/km^{2}). There were 640 housing units at an average density of 559.5 per square mile (216.0/km^{2}). The racial makeup of the city was 95.69% White, 0.40% African American, 0.73% Native American, 0.40% Asian, and 2.79% from two or more races. Hispanic or Latino of any race were 1.19% of the population.

There were 583 households, out of which 43.2% had children under the age of 18 living with them, 52.8% were married couples living together, 12.0% had a female householder with no spouse present, and 29.7% were non-families. 26.6% of all households were made up of individuals, and 10.8% had someone living alone who was 65 years of age or older. The average household size was 2.58 and the average family size was 3.13.

In the city, the population was spread out, with 31.8% under the age of 18, 8.7% from 18 to 24, 33.1% from 25 to 44, 17.2% from 45 to 64, and 9.2% who were 65 years of age or older. The median age was 30 years. For every 100 females, there were 90.6 males. For every 100 females age 18 and over, there were 86.8 males.

The median income for a household in the city was $30,417, and the median income for a family was $39,432. Males had a median income of $26,650 versus $20,395 for females. The per capita income for the city was $16,173. About 9.3% of families and 11.5% of the population were below the poverty line, including 14.1% of those under age 18 and 9.7% of those age 65 or over.

== Economy ==
The City of Rogersville began to see improved economic growth in 2016 as evidenced by increases in housing permits, commercial development, and record-breaking growth of the Rogersville Area Chamber of Commerce.

Every year, the Rogersville Area Chamber of Commerce presents a Business of the Year Award to a local business for their service to the community. Recent recipients of the award are listed below:

- Wildcat Tool Rental (2012)
- Red Rock Coffee Company (2013)
- Legacy Bank and Trust (2014)
- Greenbox Photography (2015)
- Slingshot Creative (2016)
- Fordland Clinic (2017)
- Outlaw Gentlemen Barber Shop (2018)
- Sonic Drive-In (2019)
- K-ROG Wildcat TV & Radio (2020)
- Storytime Coffee (2021)

== Arts and culture ==
In the City of Rogersville alongside Highway B and the passing train tracks, there is a revitalized Frisco caboose that represents the Rogersville Caboose Veterans Memorial. The memorial was donated by the American Legion Goad-Ballinger Post 69 on July 1, 1995, and contains a plaque that reads as follows:

Dedicated to all American Veterans of War who through their patriotism and valor helped to preserve the freedom of the United States of America for all its people. One nation, under God, indivisible, with liberty & justice for all.

The purple dinosaur at the City of Rogersville Park, described as a "beloved piece of playground equipment", was stolen in August 2021, which prompted city-wide investigation and monetary rewards from local businesses. In December 2021, a Michigan man happened to have the same purple dinosaur and donated the playground piece to the City of Rogersville after seeing the story online.

== Government ==
The finances of the City of Rogersville are regularly audited by an independent agency to ensure proper financial conduct by the city government. As of spring 2020, the most recent publicly available audit report was for the year ended June 30, 2017. The audit listed a potential concern with segregation of duties citing "because of a limited number of available personnel, it is not always possible to adequately segregate certain incompatible duties so that no one employee has access to both physical assets and the related accounting records, or to all phases of a transaction". The City responded to this finding citing it "believes that at this time, adding staff or implementing additional procedures is not cost justified, nor would it meaningfully improve this finding".

The below table summarizes the 2016–2017 revenues and expenses for the City of Rogersville.

City of Rogersville Financial Summary (6/30/16 – 6/30/17)
Revenue/Expense	Value
Governmental Activities Revenue	$1,263,298
Business-Type Activities Revenue	$1,529,964
Total Revenues	$2,793,262
Administration Expenses	$285,478
Police and Court Expenses	$509,429
Street Expenses	$160,553
Park Expenses	$76,845
Debt Service Expenses	$61,687
Water and Sewer Expenses	$1,290,082
Total Expenses	$2,384,074

In response to the spread of COVID-19, the City of Rogersville issued a stay-at-home order on March 27, 2020, but still allowed essential activities to take place.

== Education ==
Rogersville has a lending library, a branch of the Webster County Library.

Rogersville is served by the Logan-Rogersville R-VIII School District, which contains 3 elementary and 2 secondary schools. The public schools are listed below.

=== Elementary schools ===
- Logan-Rogersville Primary School (Pre-K – 1st)
- Logan-Rogersville Elementary School (2nd – 3rd)
- Logan-Rogersville Upper Elementary School (4th – 6th)

=== Secondary schools ===
- Logan-Rogersville Middle School (7th – 8th)
- Logan-Rogersville High School (9th – 12th)

== Infrastructure ==
The Missouri Department of Transportation oversaw the construction of Project Freeway: U.S. 60 Rogersville, which was completed in early November 2016. The project included three new interchanges built along Highway 60 and a series of outer roads and backage roads. The project was designed and built by Ozark Regional Road Constructors (ORRC) and was estimated at a cost of $27 million. The project was recognized by the Design-Build Institute of America (DBIA) with the 2017 National Award of Excellence and the Chairman's Award for Community Impact and Social Responsibility for including community components such as the project's "Young Women in Engineering Program, a partnership with the Logan-Rogersville School District, and the Minority Outreach Program at Missouri State University. The outreach programs used the highway project as a laboratory to expose female high school students to the engineering field and exposed minority students at the university to the highway design and construction industries."

In December 2016, improved railroad crossings were completed in Rogersville along Route B. The project was a partnership between the City of Rogersville, BNSF Railway, and the Missouri Department of Transportation and was estimated at a cost of $6.7 million.

In 2019, Rogersville was experiencing substantial residential development and was described as "the next boom" in Southwest Missouri by Springfield Business Journal. The unprecedented growth was estimated to increase the town's population by at least 50% in 2018–2020. A new $100 million development of housing and commercial space was constructed in response to the increased population growth. The population growth has also strained city resources including the local police force.

On April 30, 2019, an EF2 tornado impacted 75 houses in the Rogersville area. Nine school buses were also badly damaged and required the City to borrow school buses from Ozark, Missouri to continue running bus routes. Another EF1 tornado crossed Rogersville on October 21, 2019, but was more limited and only "damaged trees and outbuildings".

Construction is set to begin in 2023 for a new $22 million interchange system at U.S. Route 60 and Highway 125 to improve safety, reduce vehicle crashes, and reduce traffic congestion. The construction project will be completed by November 2024.

== See also ==
- List of cities in Missouri

== Bibliography ==
- Dale, Randy (2012). Written at Webster County Library–Rogersville. The History of Rogersville and the Surrounding Area. Vol. 1. Missouri: Briggs Printing.
