= Greene County, Missouri =

County in Missouri, United States

- County
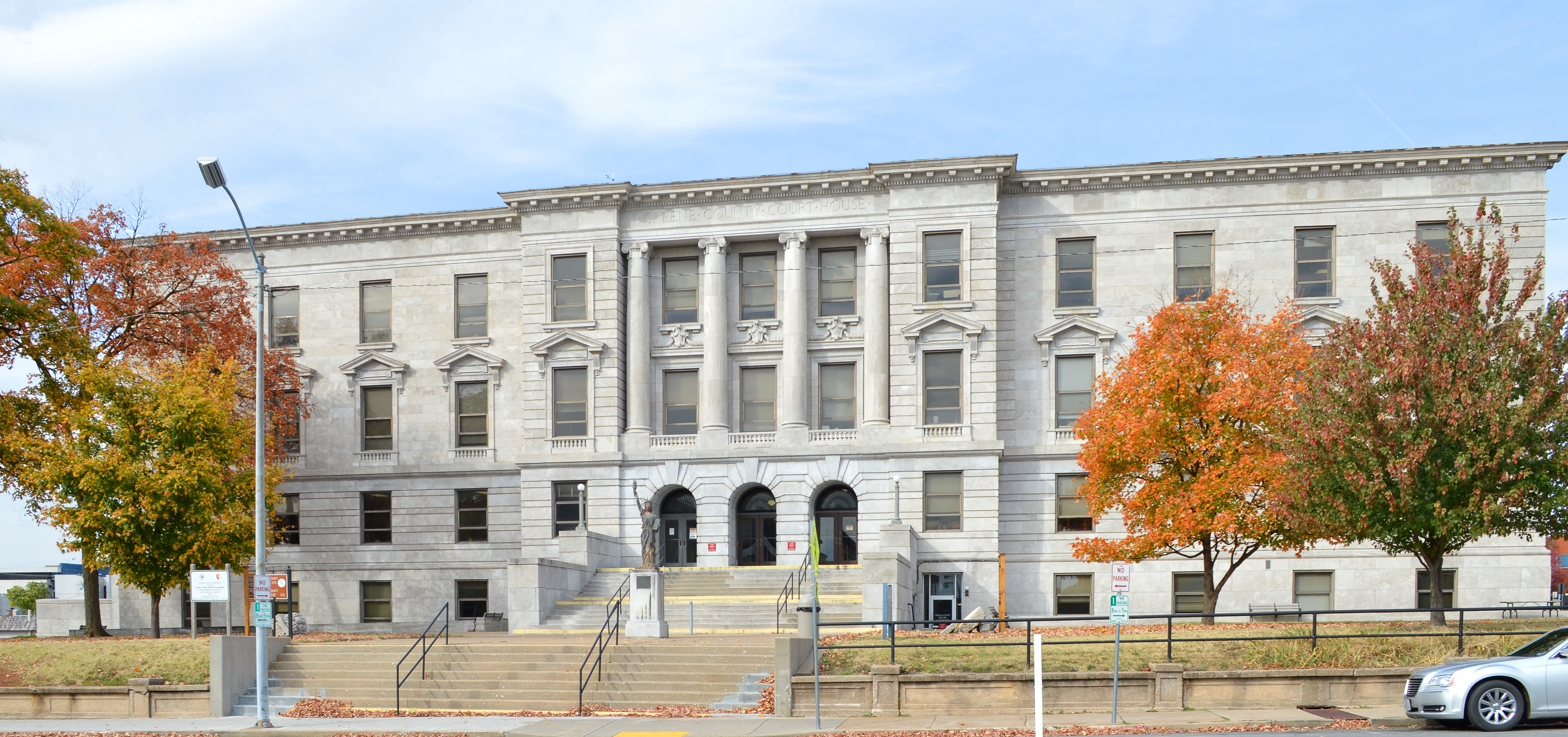
- The Historic Greene County Courthouse in Springfield

- Location within the U.S. state of Missouri
- Coordinates: 37°16′N 93°20′W
- Country: United States
- State: Missouri
- Founded: January 2, 1833
- Named for: Nathanael Greene
- Seat: Springfield
- Largest city: Springfield

Area
  - Total: 678 sq mi (1,760 km^{2})
  - Land: 675 sq mi (1,750 km^{2})
  - Water: 2.6 sq mi (6.7 km^{2}) 0.4%

Population (2020)
  - Total: 298,915
  - Estimate (2025): 309,286 ▲
  - Density: 443/sq mi (171/km^{2})
- Time zone: UTC−6 (Central)
  - Summer (DST): UTC−5 (CDT)
- Congressional district: 7th
- Website: greenecountymo.gov

Greene County is located in the southwest part of the U.S. state of Missouri. As of the 2020 census, its population was 298,915. making it the fourth most-populous county in Missouri and the most populous outside the Kansas City or Saint Louis metropolitan areas.

Its county seat and most-populous city is Springfield. The county was organized in 1833 and is named after American Revolutionary War General Nathanael Greene. Greene County is included in the Springfield metropolitan area. It is in the area of the Ozark Mountains and foothills.

== Geography ==
According to the United States Census Bureau, the county has a total area of 678 square miles (1,760 km^{2}), of which 675 square miles (1,750 km^{2}) is land and 2.6 square miles (6.7 km^{2}) (0.4%) is water.

=== Adjacent counties ===
- Polk County (north)
- Dallas County (northeast)
- Webster County (east)
- Christian County (south)
- Lawrence County (southwest)
- Dade County (northwest)

=== National protected area ===
- Wilson's Creek National Battlefield

== Demographics ==
Historical population
Census	Pop.	Note	%±
1840	5,372		—
1850	12,785		138.0%
1860	13,186		3.1%
1870	21,549		63.4%
1880	28,801		33.7%
1890	48,616		68.8%
1900	52,713		8.4%
1910	63,831		21.1%
1920	68,698		7.6%
1930	82,929		20.7%
1940	90,541		9.2%
1950	104,923		15.9%
1960	126,276		20.4%
1970	152,929		21.1%
1980	185,302		21.2%
1990	207,949		12.2%
2000	240,391		15.6%
2010	275,174		14.5%
2020	298,915		8.6%
2025 (est.)	309,286	▲	3.5%
U.S. Decennial Census; 1790-1960 1900-1990; 1990-2000 2010-2020

=== 2020 census ===
As of the 2020 census, Greene County had a population of 298,915, a median age of 36.8 years, 20.6% of residents under the age of 18, and 17.1% of residents 65 years of age or older. For every 100 females there were 95.3 males, and for every 100 females age 18 and over there were 92.7 males age 18 and over.

The racial makeup of the county was 83.9% White, 3.4% Black or African American, 0.7% American Indian and Alaska Native, 2.1% Asian, 0.1% Native Hawaiian and Pacific Islander, 1.7% from some other race, and 8.0% from two or more races. Hispanic or Latino residents of any race comprised 4.8% of the population.

85.9% of residents lived in urban areas, while 14.1% lived in rural areas.

There were 126,028 households in the county, of which 25.8% had children under the age of 18 living with them and 29.2% had a female householder with no spouse or partner present. About 32.5% of all households were made up of individuals and 11.6% had someone living alone who was 65 years of age or older. There were 136,450 housing units, of which 7.6% were vacant. Among occupied housing units, 56.0% were owner-occupied and 44.0% were renter-occupied, with a homeowner vacancy rate of 1.6% and a rental vacancy rate of 8.2%.

=== Racial and ethnic composition ===
Greene County, Missouri – Racial and ethnic composition Note: the US Census treats Hispanic/Latino as an ethnic category. This table excludes Latinos from the racial categories and assigns them to a separate category. Hispanics/Latinos may be of any race.
Race / ethnicity (NH = Non-Hispanic)	Pop 1980	Pop 1990	Pop 2000	Pop 2010	Pop 2020	% 1980	% 1990	% 2000	% 2010	% 2020
White alone (NH)	179,112	199,639	222,447	246,378	246,368	96.66%	96.00%	92.54%	89.54%	82.42%
Black or African American alone (NH)	2,985	3,712	5,322	7,738	9,987	1.61%	1.79%	2.21%	2.81%	3.34%
Native American or Alaska Native alone (NH)	932	1,238	1,513	1,667	1,735	0.50%	0.60%	0.63%	0.61%	0.58%
Asian alone (NH)	811	1,485	2,681	4,489	6,182	0.44%	0.71%	1.12%	1.63%	2.07%
Native Hawaiian or Pacific Islander alone (NH)	x	x	136	291	375	x	x	0.06%	0.11%	0.13%
Other race alone (NH)	207	100	272	208	1,101	0.11%	0.05%	0.11%	0.08%	0.37%
Mixed-race or multiracial (NH)	x	x	3,586	6,196	18,775	x	x	1.49%	2.25%	6.28%
Hispanic or Latino (any race)	1,255	1,775	4,434	8,207	14,392	0.68%	0.85%	1.84%	2.98%	4.81%
Total	185,302	207,949	240,391	275,174	298,915	100.00%	100.00%	100.00%	100.00%	100.00%

=== 2000 census ===
As of the census of 2000, there were 240,391 people, 97,859 households, and 61,846 families residing in the county. The population density was 356 inhabitants per square mile (137/km^{2}). There were 104,517 housing units at an average density of 155 units per square mile (60 units/km^{2}). The racial makeup of the county was 93.54% White, 2.26% Black or African American, 0.66% Native American, 1.13% Asian, 0.06% Pacific Islander, 0.67% from other races, and 1.68% from two or more races. Approximately 1.84% of the population were Hispanic or Latino of any race.

There were 97,859 households, out of which 28.30% had children under the age of 18 living with them, 50.00% were married couples living together, 9.80% had a female householder with no husband present, and 36.80% were non-families. 29.10% of all households were made up of individuals, and 9.70% had someone living alone who was 65 years of age or older. The average household size was 2.34 and the average family size was 2.89.

In the county, the population was spread out, with 22.30% under the age of 18, 13.80% from 18 to 24, 28.60% from 25 to 44, 21.80% from 45 to 64, and 13.60% who were 65 years of age or older. The median age was 35 years. For every 100 females, there were 94.40 males. For every 100 females age 18 and over, there were 91.20 males.

The median income for a household in the county was $44,185, and the median income for a family was $56,047. Males had a median income of $30,672 versus $21,987 for females. The per capita income for the county was $25,770. About 7.60% of families and 12.10% of the population were below the poverty line, including 13.60% of those under age 18 and 7.50% of those age 65 or over.

There were 190,417 registered voters in Greene County.

== Emergency services ==
Republic and Springfield have city fire departments. Additionally, the county is served by the following fire districts:

- Ash Grove
- Battlefield
- Billings
- Bois D'arc
- Brookline
- Ebenezer
- Fair Grove
- Logan-Rogersville
- Strafford
- Walnut Grove
- West Republic
- Willard

Law enforcement is provided by the Greene County Sheriff's Office. The current sheriff is Jim C. Arnott.

== Government and politics ==
=== Political culture ===
Like most counties situated in Southwest Missouri, Greene County has long been a Republican stronghold. In the 2016 presidential election, Donald Trump carried Greene County by a margin of 60% to 33%. It is exceptionally Republican for an urban and suburban county.

The last Democratic presidential nominee to win Greene County was Lyndon B. Johnson in 1964.

In 2004, state residents voted on a constitutional amendment to define marriage as the union between a man and a woman. This passed Greene County with 72.04 percent of the vote. The initiative passed the state with 71 percent of support from voters; Missouri became the first state to ban same-sex marriage. In 2006, Missourians voted on a constitutional amendment to fund and legalize embryonic stem cell research in the state—it narrowly failed in Greene County with 51.62 percent voting against the measure. The initiative narrowly passed the state with 51 percent of support from voters as Missouri became one of the first states in the nation to approve embryonic stem cell research.

Despite Greene County's longstanding tradition of supporting socially conservative platforms, voters in the county have a penchant for advancing populist causes, such as increasing the minimum wage. In 2006, Missourians voted on a proposition (Proposition B) to increase the minimum wage in the state to $6.50 an hour—it passed Greene County with 74.41 percent of the vote. The proposition strongly passed every single county in Missouri, with 78.99 percent voting in favor as the minimum wage was increased to $6.50 an hour in the state. During the same election, voters in five other states also strongly approved increases in the minimum wage. In 2020, Greene County was one of only eight counties in Missouri and the only one outside St. Louis, Kansas City, and Columbia to vote yes on Amendment 2 to expand Medicaid. Its voters recognized they could be helped by such expansion; the measure passed Greene County with 52.3 percent of the vote and statewide with 53.3 percent.

Republicans hold all county-level elected offices. However, the county has been known to support Democrats in statewide races. Mel Carnahan carried the county in both of his runs for governor, as did Jay Nixon. In 2000, Bob Holden's victory in the county provided the margin that allowed him to defeat Jim Talent statewide.

=== Local ===
The Republican Party predominantly controls politics at the local level in Greene County.

Greene County, Missouri

Elected countywide officials
Assessor	Brent Johnson	Republican
Auditor	Cindy Stein	Republican
Circuit Clerk	Bryan Feemster	Republican
County Clerk	Shane Schoeller	Republican
Collector	Allen Icet	Republican
Commissioner (presiding)	Bob Dixon	Republican
Commissioner (district 1)	Rusty MacLachlan	Republican
Commissioner (district 2)	John Russell	Republican
Prosecuting Attorney	Dan Patterson	Republican
Public Administrator	Sherri Martin	Republican
Recorder	Cheryl Dawson-Spaulding	Republican
Sheriff	Jim Arnott	Republican
Treasurer	Justin Hill	Republican

=== State ===
==== Gubernatorial ====
Past gubernatorial election results
Year	Republican	Democratic	Third parties
2024	58.96% 84,418	39.07% 55,938	1.97% 2,833
2020	59.72% 84,582	37.79% 53,519	2.49% 3,523
2016	56.77% 73,601	37.76% 51,201	3.72% 4,841
2012	47.62% 59,660	49.46% 61,970	2.92% 3,659
2008	42.84% 57,565	54.45% 73,164	2.71% 3,641
2004	61.45% 76,645	37.25% 46,470	1.30% 1,621
2000	53.57% 54,770	44.61% 45,612	1.82% 1,861
1996	51.63% 49,991	45.08% 43,646	3.29% 3,189

==== Missouri House of Representatives ====
Greene County is divided into eight legislative districts in the Missouri House of Representatives; six of which are held by Republicans and two Democratic seats.

- District 130 — Bishop Davidson (R-Springfield). The district includes the northern part of the city of Springfield and the rural area of north-central Greene County.

Missouri House of Representatives — District 130 — Greene County (2020)
Party	Candidate	Votes	%	±%
Republican	Bishop Davidson	15,609	76.83%	+5.61
Democratic	Dave Gragg	4,665	22.96%	−5.75

- District 131 — Bill Owen (R-Springfield). The district includes the northern part of the city of Springfield and the rural area of north-central Greene County.

Missouri House of Representatives — District 131 — Greene County (2020)
Party	Candidate	Votes	%	±%
Republican	Bill Owen	10,827	65.64%	−1.59
Democratic	Allison Schoolcraft	5,642	34.21%	+1.63

- District 132 — Crystal Quade (D-Springfield). The district is based entirely in the city of Springfield.

Missouri House of Representatives — District 132 — Greene County (2020)
Party	Candidate	Votes	%	±%
Democratic	Crystal Quade	6,289	59.17%	−5.0
Republican	Sara Semple	4,320	40.64%	+5.09

- District 133 — Curtis Trent (R-Springfield). The district includes Battlefield and part of the city of Springfield.

Missouri House of Representatives — District 133 — Greene County (2020)
Party	Candidate	Votes	%	±%
Republican	Curtis D. Trent	13,037	64.94%	+.67
Democratic	Cindy Slimp	7,005	34.90%	−.69

- District 134 — Alex Riley (R-Springfield). The district includes part of the city of Springfield.

Missouri House of Representatives — District 134 — Greene County (2020)
Party	Candidate	Votes	%	±%
Republican	Alex Riley	10,469	55.72%	1.17
Democratic	Derrick Nowlin	8,291	44.13%	+1.15

- District 135 — Betsy Fogle (D-Springfield). The district exists entirely within the city of Springfield.

Missouri House of Representatives — District 135 — Greene County (2020)
Party	Candidate	Votes	%	±%
Democratic	Betsy Fogle	8,555	48.20%	+1.17
Republican	Steve Helms	8,476	47.75%	−4.91
Green	Vicke Kepling	696	3.92%	+3.92

- District 136 — Craig Fishel (R-Springfield). The district includes parts of the city of Springfield and some rural areas southeast of the city.

Missouri House of Representatives — District 136 — Greene County (2020)
Party	Candidate	Votes	%	±%
Republican	Craig Fishel	13,739	58.53%	+1.39
Democratic	Jeff Munzinger	9,709	41.36%	−1.39

- District 137 — John Black (R-Marshfield). The district includes the communities of Fair Grove, Rogersville, and Strafford, as well as a large portion of Webster County.

Missouri House of Representatives — District 137 — Greene County (2020)
Party	Candidate	Votes	%	±%
Republican	John Black	9,307	76.70%	+29.12
Democratic	Raymond Lampert	2,817	23.22%	−2.13
Libertarian	Bill Boone	255	4.60%	−14.97

==== Missouri Senate ====
Greene County is divided into two districts in the Missouri Senate, both represented by Republicans: District 20, representing large parts of Greene and Christian County; and District 30, mostly representing the city of Springfield.

Missouri Senate – District 20 – Greene County (2018)
Party	Candidate	Votes	%	±%
Republican	Eric Burlison	35,411	72.95%	N/A
Democratic	Jim Billedo	13,098	26.96%	N/A

Missouri Senate – District 30 – Greene County (2018)
Party	Candidate	Votes	%	±%
Republican	Lincoln Hough	34,987	53.16%	N/A
Democratic	Charlie Norr	30,690	46.63%	N/A

=== Federal ===
==== US Senate ====
U.S. Senate — Missouri — Greene County (2016)
Party	Candidate	Votes	%	±%
Republican	Roy Blunt	72,993	56.22%	+11.79
Democratic	Jason Kander	50,967	39.26%	−8.92
Libertarian	Jonathan Dine	3,626	2.79%	−4.60
Green	Johnathan McFarland	1,256	0.97%	+0.97
Constitution	Fred Ryman	978	0.75%	+0.75
Write-In	Write-ins	7	0.01%	+0.01

U.S. Senate — Missouri — Greene County (2012)
Party	Candidate	Votes	%	±%
Republican	Todd Akin	55,304	44.43%	
Democratic	Claire McCaskill	59,979	48.18%	
Libertarian	Jonathan Dine	9,197	7.39%	

==== US House of Representatives ====
All of Greene County is included in Missouri's 7th Congressional District and is currently represented by Billy Long (R-Springfield) in the U.S. House of Representatives.

U.S. House of Representatives — Missouri's 7th Congressional District — Greene County (2016)
Party	Candidate	Votes	%	±%
Republican	Billy Long	74,876	58.57%	+4.75
Democratic	Genevieve Williams	45,382	35.50%	−2.19
Libertarian	Benjamin T. Brixey	7,580	5.93%	−2.56

U.S. House of Representatives — Missouri's 7th Congressional District — Greene County (2014)
Party	Candidate	Votes	%	±%
Republican	Billy Long	33,738	53.82%	−3.08
Democratic	Jim Evans	23,624	37.69%	+0.14
Libertarian	Kevin Craig	5,323	8.49%	+2.94

U.S. House of Representatives — Missouri's 7th Congressional District — Greene County (2012)
Party	Candidate	Votes	%	±%
Republican	Billy Long	70,212	56.90%	
Democratic	Jim Evans	46,331	37.55%	
Libertarian	Kevin Craig	6,850	5.55%	

==== Presidential ====
United States presidential election results for Greene County, Missouri
Year	Republican		Democratic		Third party(ies)	
Year	No.	%	No.	%	No.	%
1888	4,934	50.68%	3,984	40.92%	818	8.40%
1892	4,839	45.81%	4,051	38.35%	1,673	15.84%
1896	5,808	47.58%	6,327	51.83%	72	0.59%
1900	6,009	50.65%	5,519	46.52%	336	2.83%
1904	6,570	54.98%	4,540	37.99%	839	7.02%
1908	6,439	49.81%	5,830	45.10%	659	5.10%
1912	4,350	34.63%	5,089	40.52%	3,121	24.85%
1916	7,543	48.95%	7,191	46.66%	676	4.39%
1920	15,755	56.02%	11,514	40.94%	857	3.05%
1924	13,618	45.74%	13,084	43.95%	3,069	10.31%
1928	22,166	66.86%	10,901	32.88%	84	0.25%
1932	13,943	42.52%	18,255	55.67%	596	1.82%
1936	17,298	44.46%	21,489	55.23%	119	0.31%
1940	21,456	49.10%	22,130	50.65%	109	0.25%
1944	21,531	55.37%	17,287	44.46%	68	0.17%
1948	18,836	47.49%	20,762	52.34%	66	0.17%
1952	29,673	60.57%	19,234	39.26%	81	0.17%
1956	29,944	59.71%	20,206	40.29%	0	0.00%
1960	36,943	64.36%	20,457	35.64%	0	0.00%
1964	23,989	44.33%	30,130	55.67%	0	0.00%
1968	32,638	55.27%	19,659	33.29%	6,751	11.43%
1972	48,348	70.58%	20,155	29.42%	0	0.00%
1976	37,691	52.20%	33,824	46.84%	690	0.96%
1980	43,116	55.69%	30,498	39.39%	3,811	4.92%
1984	57,250	67.18%	27,965	32.82%	0	0.00%
1988	52,211	59.36%	35,475	40.33%	267	0.30%
1992	46,457	43.95%	41,137	38.91%	18,119	17.14%
1996	48,193	49.60%	39,300	40.45%	9,671	9.95%
2000	59,178	57.50%	41,091	39.92%	2,657	2.58%
2004	77,885	62.18%	46,657	37.25%	724	0.58%
2008	77,683	57.06%	56,181	41.26%	2,283	1.68%
2012	76,900	60.83%	46,219	36.56%	3,300	2.61%
2016	78,035	59.79%	42,728	32.74%	9,760	7.48%
2020	83,630	58.98%	55,068	38.83%	3,102	2.19%
2024	85,956	59.68%	55,971	38.86%	2,110	1.46%

=== Missouri presidential preference primary (2008) ===
Voters in Greene County from both political parties supported candidates who finished in second place in the state at large and nationally. During the 2008 presidential primary, U.S. Senator Hillary Clinton (D-New York) received more votes, a total of 18,322, in Greene County than any other candidate from either party.

== Education ==
School districts include:

- Ash Grove R-IV School District
- Fair Grove R-X School District
- Logan-Rogersville R-VIII School District
- Marion C. Early R-V School District
- Nixa School District
- Pleasant Hope R-VI School District
- Republic R-III School District
- Springfield R-XII School District
- Strafford R-VI School District
- Walnut Grove R-V School District
- Willard R-2 School District

=== Public schools ===
- Ash Grove R-IV School District - Ash Grove
  - Ash Grove Elementary School (PK-06)
  - Bois D'Arc Elementary School (K-06) - Bois D'Arc
  - Ash Grove High School (07-12)
- Fair Grove R-X School District] - Fair Grove
  - Fair Grove Elementary School (K-04)
  - Fair Grove Middle School (05-08)
  - Fair Grove High School (09-12)
- Logan-Rogersville R-VIII School District - Rogersville
  - Logan-Rogersville Primary School (PK-01)
  - Logan-Rogersville Elementary School (02-03)
  - Logan-Rogersville Upper Elementary School (04-06)
  - Logan-Rogersville Middle School (07-08)
  - Logan-Rogersville High School (09-12)
- Republic R-III School District - Republic
  - Republic Kindergarten School (K)
  - Republic Elementary School I (01-02)
  - Republic Elementary School II (03-04)
  - Republic Elementary School III (05-06)
  - Republic Middle School (07-08)
  - Republic High School (09-12)
- Springfield R-XII School District - Springfield
  - Shady Dell Early Childhood Center (PK) - Springfield
  - York Elementary School (PK-05) - Springfield
  - Williams Elementary School (K-05) - Springfield
  - Wilder Elementary School (K-05) - Springfield
  - Westport Elementary School (K-05) - Springfield
  - Weller Elementary School (PK-05) - Springfield
  - Weaver Elementary School (K-05) - Springfield
  - Watkins Elementary School (PK-05) - Springfield
  - Truman Elementary School (K-05) - Springfield
  - Sunshine Elementary School (K-05) - Springfield
  - Sherwood Elementary School (K-05) - Springfield
  - Sequiota Elementary School (K-05) - Springfield
  - Rountree Elementary School (K-05) - Springfield
  - Robberson Elementary School (K-05) - Springfield
  - Portland Elementary School (K-05) - Springfield
  - Pleasant View Elementary School (K-05) - Springfield
  - Pittman Elementary School (K-05) - Springfield
  - Pershing Elementary School (K-05) - Springfield
  - McGregor Elementary School (K-05) - Springfield
  - McBride Elementary School (K-04) - Springfield
  - Mark Twain Elementary School (K-05) - Springfield
  - Walt Disney Elementary School (K-05) - Springfield
  - Jeffries Elementary School (PK-05) - Springfield
  - Horace Mann Elementary School (PK-05) - Springfield
  - Holland Elementary School (K-05) - Springfield
  - Hickory Hills Elementary School (K-05) - Springfield
  - Gray Elementary School (K-04) - Springfield
  - Fremont Elementary School (PK-05) - Springfield
  - Field Elementary School (K-05) - Springfield
  - Delaware Elementary School (K-05) - Springfield
  - David Harrison Elementary School (K-04) - Springfield
  - Cowden Elementary School (PK-05) - Springfield
  - Campbell Elementary School (K-05) - Springfield
  - Boyd Elementary School (PK-05) - Springfield
  - Bowerman Elementary School (K-05) - Springfield
  - Bissett Elementary School (K-05) - Springfield
  - Bingham Elementary School (K-05) - Springfield
  - Wilson's Creek 5-6 Intermediate Center (05-06) - Battlefield
  - Study Middle School (06-08) - Springfield
  - Reed Middle School (06-08) - Springfield
  - Pleasant View Middle School (06-08) - Springfield
  - Pipkin Middle School (06-08) - Springfield
  - Pershing Middle School (06-08) - Springfield
  - Jarrett Middle School (06-08) - Springfield
  - Hickory Hills Middle School (06-08) - Springfield
  - Cherokee Middle School (06-08) - Springfield
  - Carver Middle School (06-08) - Springfield
  - Parkview High School (09-12) - Springfield
  - Kickapoo High School (09-12) - Springfield
  - Hillcrest High School (09-12) - Springfield
  - Glendale High School (09-12) - Springfield
  - Central High School (09-12) - Springfield
- Strafford R-VI School District - Strafford
  - Strafford Early Childhood Center (PK-K)
  - Strafford Elementary School (01-04)
  - Strafford Middle School (05-08)
  - Strafford High School (09-12)
- Walnut Grove R-V School District - Walnut Grove
  - Walnut Grove Preschool (PK)
  - Walnut Grove Elementary School (K-06)
  - Walnut Grove High School (07-12)
- Willard R-2 School District - Willard
  - Willard North Elementary School (PK-04) - Willard
  - Willard East Elementary School (K-04) - Willard
  - Willard South Elementary School (PK-04) - Springfield
  - Willard Central Elementary School (K-04) - Springfield
  - Willard Intermediate School (05-06) - Willard
  - Willard Middle School (07-08) - Willard
  - Willard High School (09-12) - Willard

=== Private schools ===
- Christian Schools of Springfield (PK-12) - Springfield - Baptist
- Grace Classical Academy (PK-12) - Springfield - nondenominational Christianity
- Greenwood Laboratory School (K-12) - Springfield - nonsectarian
- Immaculate Conception School (PK-8) - Springfield - Roman Catholic
- New Covenant Academy (PK-12) - Springfield - nondenominational Christianity
- Springfield Catholic High School (09-12) - Springfield - Roman Catholic
- Springfield Lutheran School (PS-8) - Springfield - Lutheran MO Synod
- St. Agnes Cathedral School (PK-8) - Springfield - Roman Catholic
- St. Elizabeth Ann Seton School (PK-5) - Springfield - Roman Catholic
- The Summit Preparatory School of Southwest Missouri (PK-12) - Springfield - nonsectarian

=== Alternative/other schools ===
- Bailey Educational Center (09-12) - Springfield - alternative/other school
- Community Learning Center (06-12) - Springfield - alternative/other school
- Datema House (05-12) - Springfield - alternative/other School
- Excel School (06-12) - Springfield - alternative/other School
- Graff Career Center (09-12) - Springfield - vocational/technical school
- Greene County Special Education Cooperative (K-12) - Republic - special education
- Greene Valley - Springfield - special education
- Phelps Gifted Center (01-12) - Springfield - alternative/other school/gifted education
- Wilson Creek Group Home (06-12) - Springfield - alternative/other school

=== Colleges and universities ===
- Missouri State University (formerly Southwest Missouri State University) - Springfield - a public, four-year university
- Evangel University - Springfield - a private, four-year Pentecostal liberal arts university
- Drury University - Springfield - a private, four-year liberal arts university
- Mission University (formerly Baptist Bible College) - Springfield - a private, conservative Bible college owned by the Baptist Bible Fellowship International
- Ozarks Technical Community College - Springfield - a public, two-year community college
- Ozarks Technical Community College - Republic - a public, two-year community college
- Everest College - Springfield - a public, four-year for-profit Corinthian college
- Columbia College Springfield Campus - Springfield - a private, four-year college
- Bryan University Springfield Campus - Springfield - a private, four-year university
- Cox College - Springfield - a private, four-year non-profit nursing college
- University of Missouri Springfield Clinical Campus - Springfield - a public, four-year university

=== Public libraries ===
- Springfield-Greene County Library

== Transportation ==
=== Major highways ===
- I-44
  - I-44 BL (Springfield)
- US 60
- US 65
- US 160
- Route 13
- Route 125
- Route 266 – former US 66
- Route 360 – temporary designation for US 60 Byp. and US 160 Byp.
- Route 413 – temporary designation for future Route 13
- Route 744 – temporary designation for I-44 Alt.

=== Transit ===
- City Utilities of Springfield
- Springfield Transit Services
- Greyhound Lines
- Jefferson Lines

=== Airports ===
- Springfield-Branson National Airport
- Springfield Downtown Airport

== Communities ==
=== Cities and towns ===
- Ash Grove
- Battlefield
- Fair Grove
- Republic
- Rogersville
- Springfield (county seat)
- Strafford
- Walnut Grove
- Willard

=== Unincorporated communities ===
- Avalon Park
- Bois D'Arc
- Cave Spring
- Cody
- Ebenezer
- Elwood
- Glidewell
- Hackney
- Harold
- Haseltine
- Hickory Barren
- Logan
- Mentor
- Mumford
- Oak Grove Heights
- Palmetto
- Pearl
- Phenix
- Plano
- Turners

== See also ==
- List of counties in Missouri
- National Register of Historic Places listings in Greene County, Missouri
