= List of killings by law enforcement officers in the United States, March 2022 =

This is a list of people reported killed by non-military law enforcement officers in the United States in March 2022, whether in the line of duty or not, and regardless of reason or method. The listing documents the occurrence of a death, making no implications regarding wrongdoing or justification on the part of the person killed or officer involved. Killings are arranged by date of the incident that caused death. Different death dates, if known, are noted in the description. The table below lists 44 people.

== March 2022 ==
Date	Name (age) of deceased	Race	State (city)	Description
2022-03-31	Erik Poul Moller Nielsen (36)	Unknown	Columbia Township, Jackson County, Michigan	Police shot and killed Erik Poul Moller Nielsen while responding to a nearby medical emergency, though no details have been reported.
2022-03-31	Hector Miguel Portuondo (53)	Hispanic	Miami, Florida	
2022-03-31	Michael Stockton (39)	White	Scappoose, Oregon	
2022-03-31	Cody Wade Kelley (41)	White	Sioux Falls, South Dakota	
2022-03-29	Monica Vaught (49)	Asian	Greenwood, Indiana	Police responded to reports of an intoxicated driver. Following a pursuit, police fired after Vaught allegedly drove her vehicle towards officers, who fired, with seven shots being fired from behind. The Johnson County prosecutor declined to file charges against the officers involved.
2022-03-27	David Aguilera (35)	Latino	Lake Arthur, New Mexico	Police responded to reports of a disorderly subject at a dairy farm. A deputy instructed to Aguilera to handcuff himself, which he refused to do. Deputies then tased Aguilera five times and handcuffed him. At some point, one of Aguilera's hands was removed from its cuff, and Aguilera ran away. Aguilera entered the driver's seat of a police vehicle but moved to the passenger seat when police caught up. The deputies then shot Aguilera five times. Aguilera was unarmed.
2022-03-27	Lawrence Knudsen (56)	White	Maricopa, Arizona	Knudsen called police and said he was suicidal, allegedly indicating he had a gun. An officer shot Knudsen and another used a taser after he walked towards them while holding a black object. Knudsen was holding a vape pen.
2022-03-26	Clesslyn Crawford (2)	White	Baxter Springs, Kansas	Police were responding to a call for help when 27-year-old Taylor Dawn Shutte was shot and killed by 37-year-old Eli Crawford, causing a standoff between him and police. Police say that Eli died from a self-inflicted gunshot wound while his daughter, Cessie, was accidentally struck by a Joplin, Missouri Police Officer's gunfire. Cessie Crawford, age 2, later died of her wounds.
2022-03-20	Unknown	Unknown	Muskegon, Michigan	Police responded to a man in an apartment building who arrived in a stolen vehicle, shooting the man after he fired at them through a door and pursued them as they retreated.
2022-03-19	Irvin D. Moorer Charley (34)	Black	Columbia, South Carolina	While responding to a domestic violence call, Moorer Charley approached officers holding a sharp wooden object which he refused to drop despite multiple demands. After Moorer Charley was hit with a taser, he charged at police, and was shot dead.
2022-03-19	Collin Neztsosie (33)	Native American	Albuquerque, New Mexico	Police responded to reports of a man threatening to shoot someone. After 26 minutes of negotiations, police shot Neztsosie when he pointed an object at them, which was later found to be a cell phone.
2022-03-17	Greg Eugene Davis (52)	White	Lake Mead, Nevada	Federal officers from the Bureau of Land Management (BLM) and National Park Service pursued a vehicle suspected of being stolen by three men. As the truck neared officers, a BLM trainee stationed as a lookout shot all three men. The front seat passenger, Davis, was killed, and the two others were injured.
2022-03-16	Mauricio Martinez Yanez (19)	Hispanic	Seattle, Washington	A suspect in an armed robbery in Bellevue was fatally shot by officers in a standoff with police in south Seattle, according to the Seattle Police Department. Officers were searching for three suspects who reportedly robbed a Factoria marijuana shop Wednesday at 11:30 a.m. in the 5500 block of Martin Luther King Way. The day after, Bellevue police released surveillance video of the robbery.
2022-03-14	Matthew J. Parks (30)	Black	Crest Hill, Illinois	An officer shot and killed Parks at an apartment complex after responding to a domestic battery report. Police initially stated that Parks had stabbed an officer in the leg, but a later news release stated that the officer had been hit by friendly fire, and that Parks was approaching police when he was shot.
2022-03-14	Kevin Johnson (28)	Black	San Antonio, Texas	Police pursued Johnson on foot for a parole violation and possession of a firearm. During the chase Johnson tripped over an embankment and turned towards officers, who fired, killing Johnson. According to police a gun was found at the scene next to Johnson's body.
2022-03-09	Iopy Rudolph	Unknown	Dededo, Guam	Police responded to reports of a man with a slingshot at a gas station. An officer shot and killed the man, later identified as Rudolph. In 2022 the officer who shot Rudolph was charged with manslaughter and negligent homicide.
2022-03-09	Robert Charles Raymond (47)	Unknown	Lapeer County, Michigan	When attempting to arrest Raymond, who had an outstanding sexual assault warrant for arrest, Raymond shot a deputy and was shot by officers.
2022-03-08	Anthony Felix (40)	White	Joplin, Missouri	Officer Jake Reed, age 27, and Corporal Benjamin Cooper, age 46, were responding to reports of a disturbance at Northpark Mall when Felix shot them. Reed succumbed to his wounds on March 11. Felix then stole a patrol car and crashed it before attempting to steal another car, and shooting a third officer. Felix was then shot and killed by a police captain.
2022-03-07	James Gregory (39)	White	Colorado Springs, Colorado	
2022-03-07	Joshua Dismuke (18)	Black	South Pittsburg, Tennessee	
2022-03-06	Miguel Ruiz Rivera (28)	Hispanic	Austin, Texas	
2022-03-06	Albert Beckworth-Thompson (34)	Unknown race	New Castle, Pennsylvania	
2022-03-06	Lester Carlton Epps (58)	White	Richmond, Virginia	
2022-03-06	Jerry Lott (33)	White	Peoria, Arizona	
2022-03-05	William Stephens (39)	White	Seattle, Washington	"Seattle police shot and killed a man armed with a long gun outside the Federal Office Building in downtown Seattle the night of March 5."
2022-03-05	Feliciano Lionel Jimenez (64)	Hispanic	San Antonio, Texas	
2022-03-04	Michael Ramos Jr. (41)	Hispanic	Boron, California	
2022-03-04	Samuel Yeatts Wilson (33)	White	Hollywood, Alabama	
2022-03-03	Yan Li (47)	Asian	San Diego, California	Police attempted to serve an eviction warrant in Little Italy when Li allegedly stabbed a K-9 handler with a knife. One San Diego Police officer and three San Diego County Sheriff's deputies fired their weapons, killing her.
2022-03-03	Jon Jones Sr. (84)	White	Gainesville, Georgia	
2022-03-03	Kevin P. Zimmerman (36)	White	Dunkirk, Indiana	
2022-03-03	Juan Herrera (14)	Hispanic	Midland, Texas	
2022-03-03	Edgar Ortiz (32)	Hispanic	Bellflower, California	
2022-03-03	Osman Brown (41)	Black	Anaheim, California	
2022-03-03	Jamarian Marquis McGhee (29)	Black	Denver, Colorado	
2022-03-03	Alfred Calvin Moss III (44)	White	Neskowin, Oregon	
2022-03-02	Alberto Riascos (18)	Black	Houston, Texas	
2022-03-02	Crasteven Kennon Wilson (23)	Black	Oklahoma City, Oklahoma	
2022-03-02	Kevin C. Steinhauer (45)	White	Collinsville, Illinois	
2022-03-02	Frank Lovato (62)	White	Santa Fe, New Mexico	
2022-03-01	Luke David Stash (33)	White	Connellsville, Pennsylvania	
2022-03-01	Darian Quinlan Bryant (26)	Black	Jacksonville, Florida	
2022-03-01	Jeremy R. Lau (46)	White	Patten, Maine	
2022-03-01	Thomas "TJ" Siderio (12)	White	Philadelphia, Pennsylvania	An officer shot Siderio in the back after a shot was fired at a police vehicle. An initial statement reported that Siderio was the person who fired the shot, and a later statement said Sidero threw the gun away and was on the ground and unarmed when he was shot. Two months later, the officer involved, Edsaul Mendoza, was charged with first- and third-degree murder, among other charges.

== See also ==
- Death in custody § United States
- Henry A. Wallace Police Crime Public Database
- List of cases of police brutality
- List of countries with annual rates and counts for killings by law enforcement officers
- List of law enforcement officers killed in the line of duty in the United States
- List of law enforcement officers convicted for an on-duty killing in the United States
- List of police reforms related to the George Floyd protests
- List of unarmed African Americans killed by law enforcement officers in the United States
- Lists of killings by law enforcement officers
- Police brutality in the United States
- Police misconduct § United States
- Police riot § United States
- Police use of deadly force in the United States
