= Newman Brothers Building =

- U.S. National Register of Historic Places
- U.S. Historic district – Contributing property
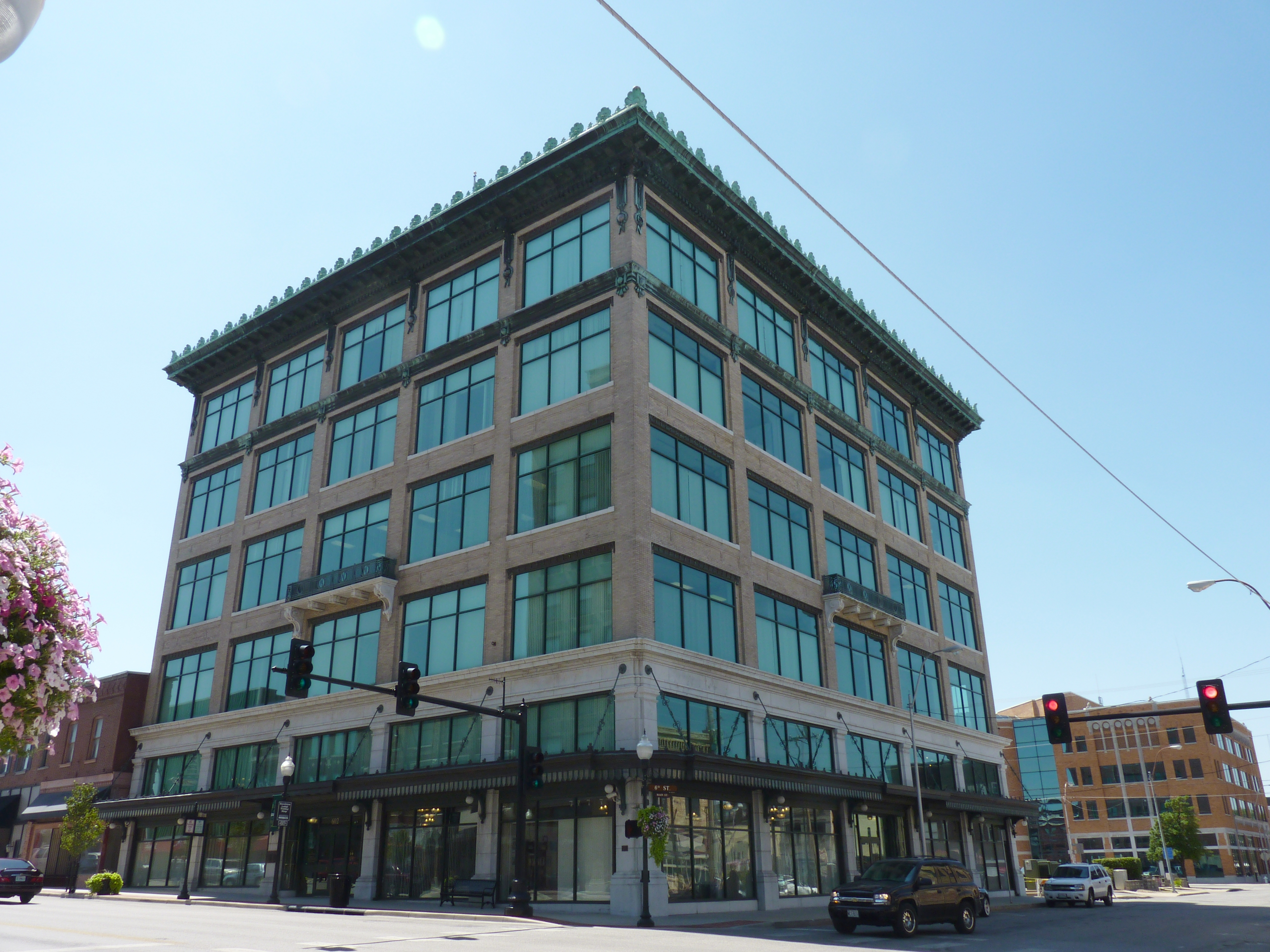

- Location within Missouri Location within the United States
- Location: 602-608 S. Main St., Joplin, Missouri 37°5′7″N 94°30′45″W
- Coordinates: 37°5′7″N 94°30′45″W
- Area: less than one acre
- Built: 1910
- Architect: Allen, Austin
- Architectural style: Chicago
- NRHP reference No.: 90001101
- Added to NRHP: July 23, 1990

The Newman Brothers Building is a former commercial building in Joplin, Missouri. The building was the home of Newman's Department Store from 1910 to 1972. In 1990, the building was entered into the National Register of Historic Places. After going through several owners, the building is now occupied by Joplin city offices. It is located in the Joplin Downtown Historic District.

== History ==
Newman Mercantile Company was founded by Jewish merchant Joseph Newman, who emigrated from Germany in the mid-19th century. He founded his first store in 1850 in Pennsylvania, before relocating to Pierce City, Missouri, where he founded Newman Mercantile in 1871. Joseph Newman's son Albert and son-in-law, Gabe Newburger, opened the first Newman's in Joplin in 1898. With the encouragement of his sons, Albert and Sol Newman, Joseph Newman purchased the property at 6th and Main streets in Joplin in 1907 in order to expand the Joplin store into a high-rise department store. Local architect Austin Allen was hired to design the building which spans the entire block. The new high-rise opened on November 16, 1910, and was the first building in Joplin to have elevators and electricity.

In 1922, Newman Mercantile purchased the Kennedy Dry Goods Company in Enid, Oklahoma which was operated by Milton Newman until his death in 1943. In 1928, the company bought the Denneky Dry Goods Company in Cedar Rapids, Iowa. After World War II, the company again expanded with additional stores in Springfield, Missouri, Hutchinson, Kansas, and Midwest City, Oklahoma.

The Newman Brothers moved into the newly built Northpark Mall in 1972. The building then housed the Messenger Book Store of the Pentecostal Church. In 1989, owner Kenny Cox ran a teen club called the Boulevard in the building, and fought the city who wanted to demolish the building. The building was restored and renovated in 1995 at a cost of 5 million dollars, by Martin Smith and Greg Fears. The City of Joplin purchased the building in 2003 and did renovations costing 3 million dollars.

Newman Mercantile closed its Enid, Hutchinson and Midwest City stores in 1987, and filed Chapter 11 and liquidated its other stores in 1988. The Pierce City storefront was destroyed by tornado in 2003.
