= Woodruff Building =

Historic building in Springfield, Missouri

- U.S. Historic district – Contributing property
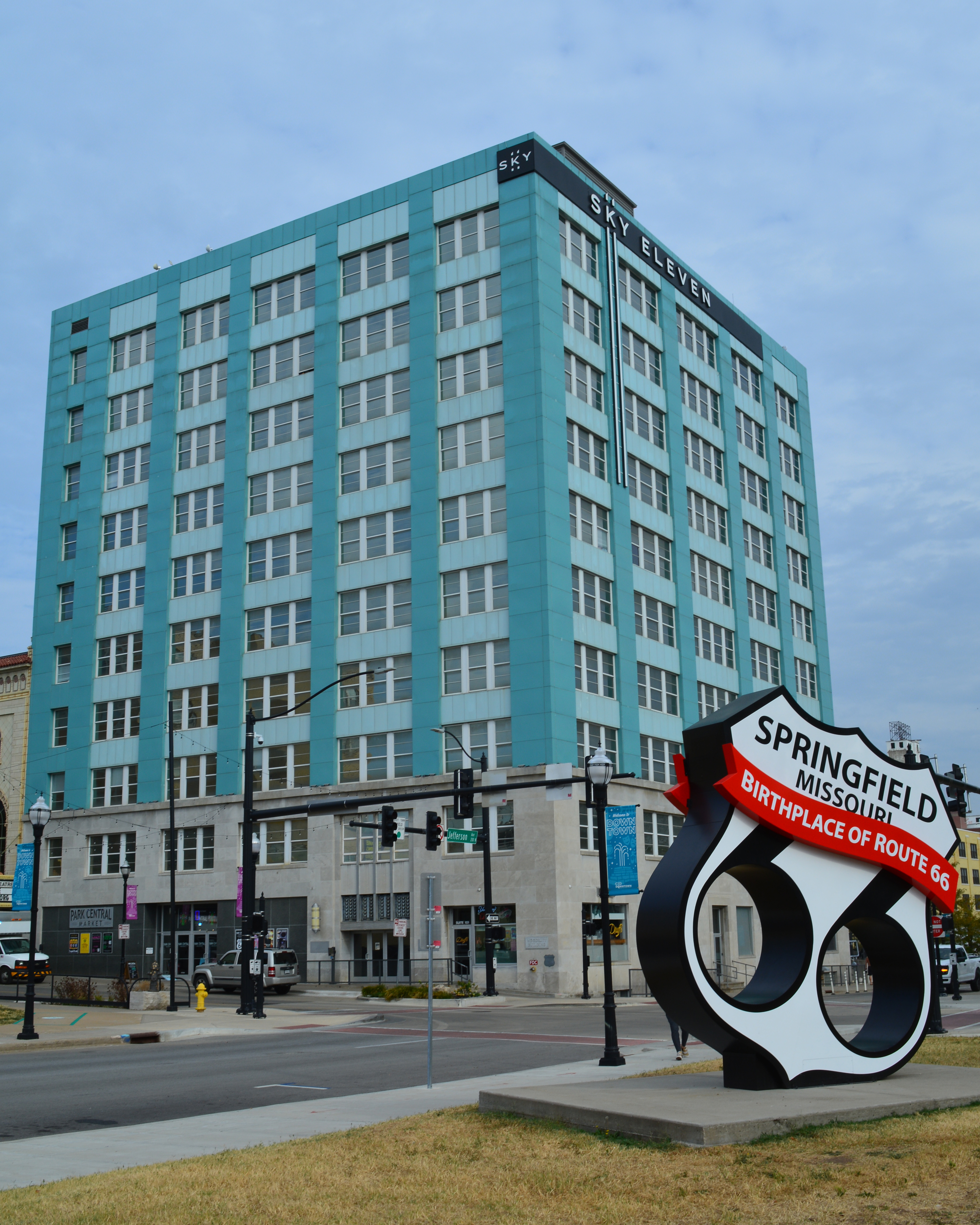
- The Woodruff Building in Springfield, MO as seen from the corner of St. Louis St. and Jefferson Ave. (ca. 2025)

- Location within Missouri Location within the United States
- Location: 331 Park Central E. Springfield, Missouri
- Coordinates: 37°12′33″N 93°17′25″W
- Area: Less than 1 acre (0.40 ha)
- Built: 1911
- Part of: Springfield Public Square Historic District (ID06000331)
- Added to NRHP: May 5, 2006

The Woodruff Building is a historic high-rise located in Springfield, Greene County, Missouri. Built in February 1911, it is often called Springfield's first "skyscraper". Originally a commercial style design with hints of early art-deco, a 1959 remodel gave the building turquoise enamel panels with a mid-century look. It houses ten stories.

It was listed on the National Register of Historic Places in 2014.

== History ==
In 1908, local business leader, John T. Woodruff purchased the land at the corner of Jefferson Ave. and Park Central East, across the street from his newly constructed Colonial Hotel, another of Woodruff's properties. Woodruff would construct the city's first "sky-scraper", comprising 276 offices, a bank, drug store, post office, tobacco store, barber shop, and billiards parlor. It was touted as Springfield's "newest, most modern, fireproof business structure."

In 1959, Woodruff sold the building to F.X. Heer for $700,000. Heer expanded the building, adding 23,000 square feet to Springfield's largest office building, at a cost of $650,000. The building changed hands to Warren Davis Properties in 1994, followed by the Vecino Group in 2013.

The Vecino Group would undergo a $13,000,000 rehabilitation of the blighted property, converting it to apartments with retail on the street level. They renamed the building "Sky Eleven", a tribute to the building's construction year of 1911.

Many original details and accents remain to this day but the 1959 remodel is most prominent with the turquoise panels and aluminum windows.

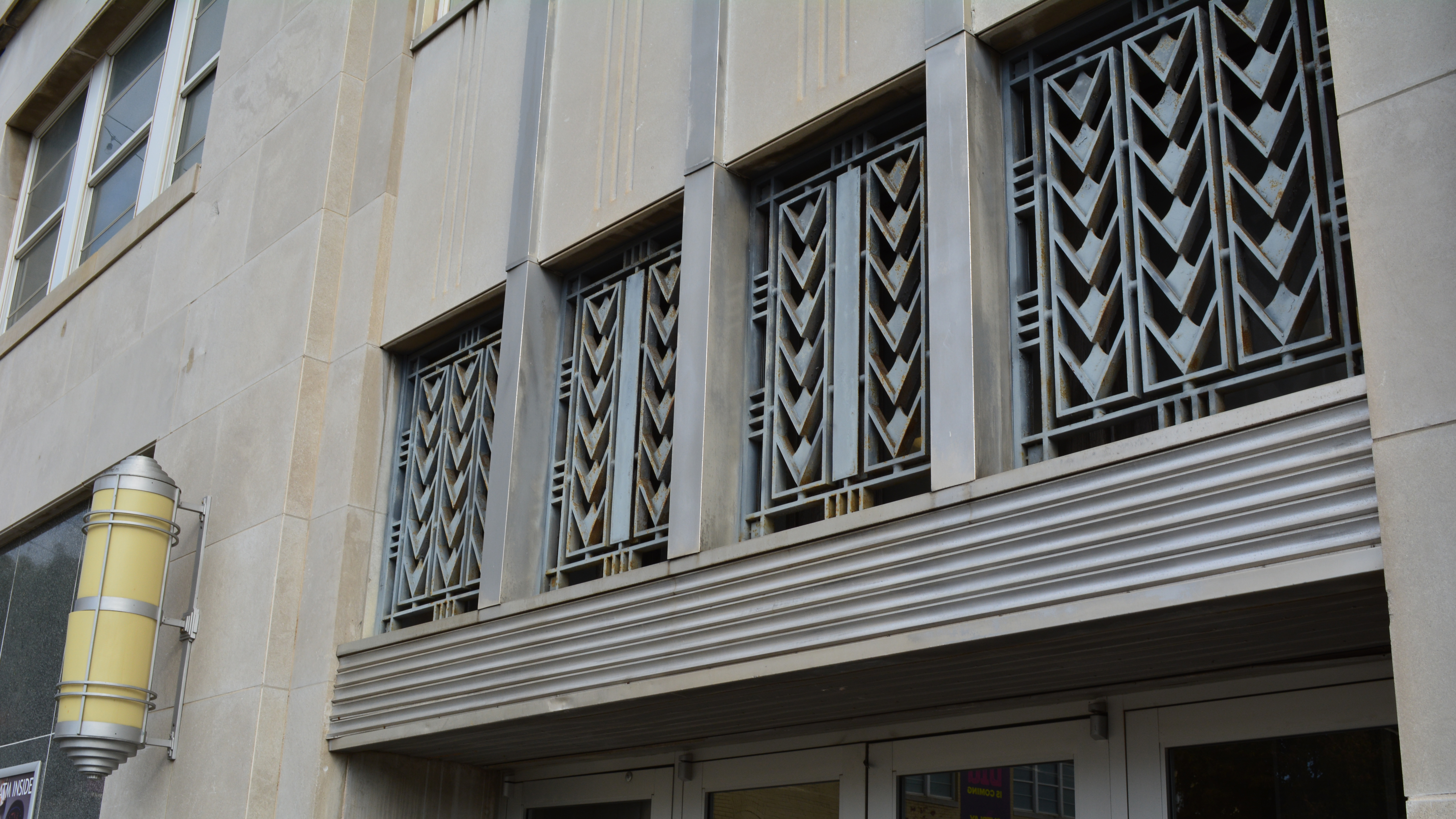
Art Deco accents preserved on the exterior of the Woodruff Building in Springfield, MO.

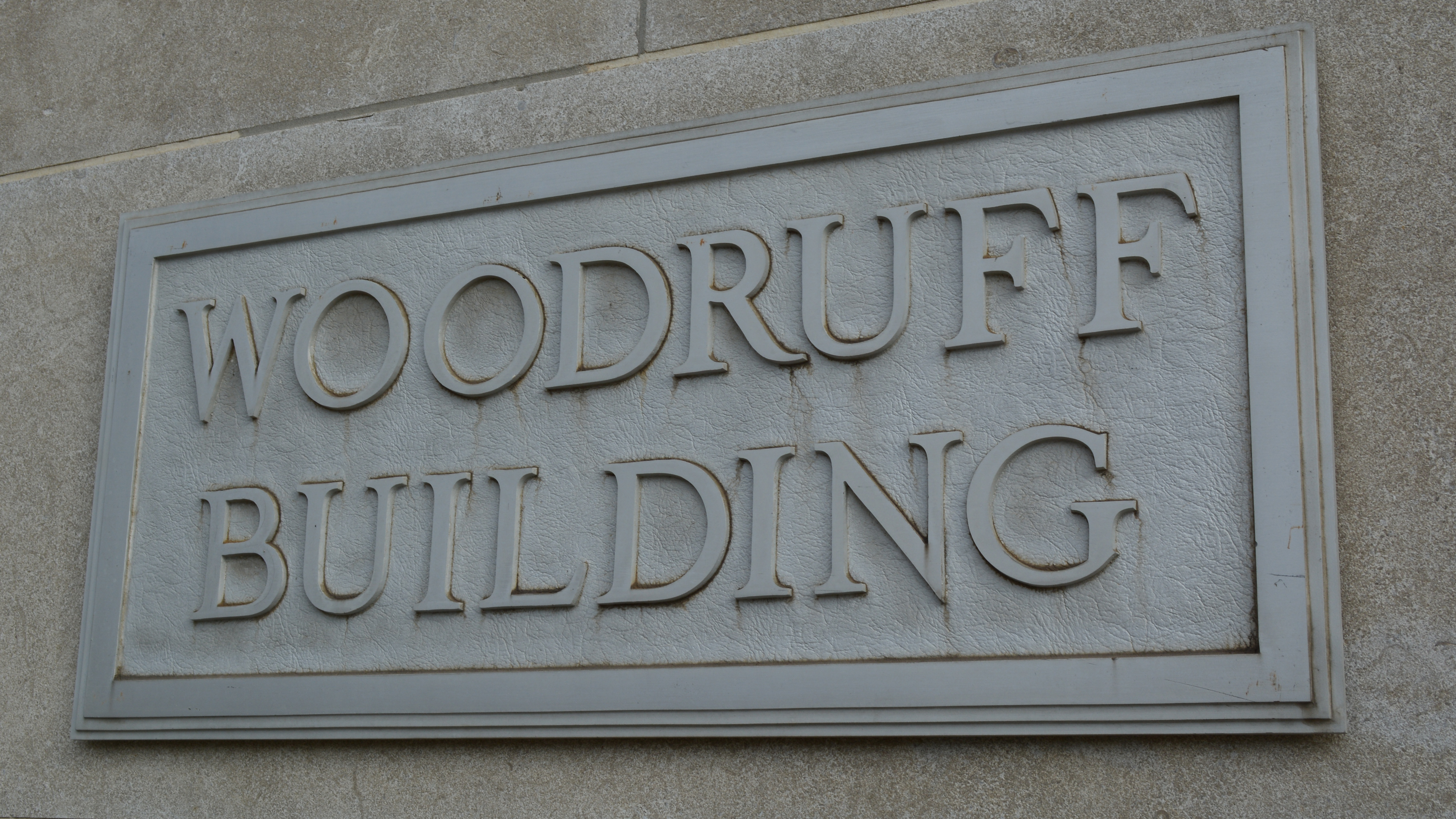
Placard outside the Woodruff Building, Springfield, MO.
