= Oakwood Mall =

Oakwood Mall may refer to:

- Oakwood Mall (Enid, Oklahoma)
- Oakwood Mall (Eau Claire, Wisconsin)
- Oakwood Center, a shopping mall in Gretna, Louisiana
