= Oakwood Mall (Enid, Oklahoma) =

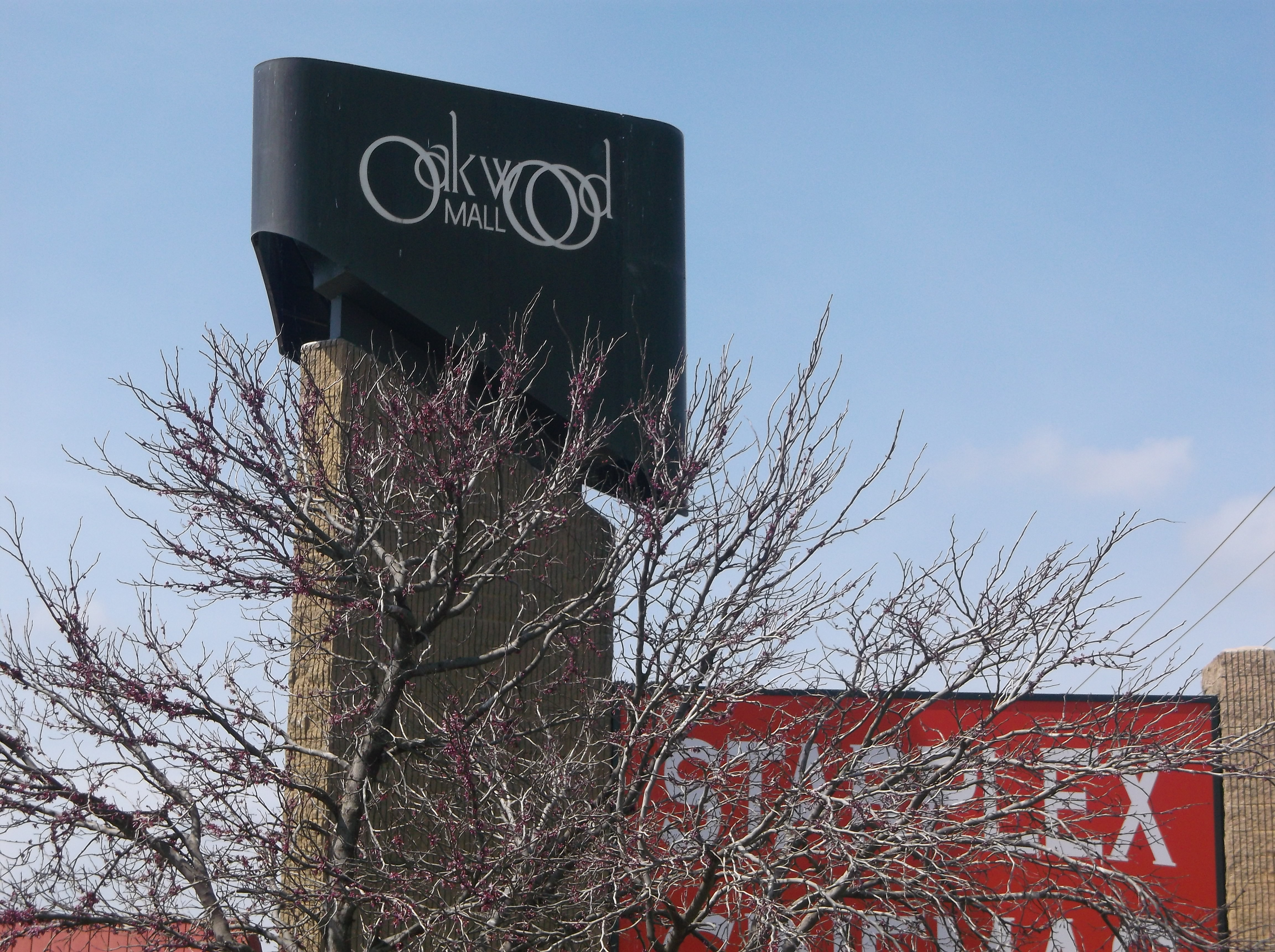
- Oakwood Mall in Enid, Oklahoma
- Location: Enid, Oklahoma, U.S.
- Coordinates: 36.3881°N 97.9294°W
- Address: 4125 W Owen K Garriott Rd.
- Opened: February 29, 1984
- Developer: Melvin Simon & Associates
- Manager: Mark McAfee
- Owner: SB Retail Group Carlsbad LLC
- Num. of stores: 10 (more than 95 at its peak)
- Num. of anchor tenants: 3 (3 vacant)
- Floor area: 616,106
- Floors: 1

Oakwood Mall is a shopping mall in Enid, Oklahoma, United States. There are about 53,000 people that live within five miles (8.0 km) and 178,000 within 50 miles (80 km) of the mall. The property sits at just over 62 acres.

== History ==
The Oakwood Mall opened on February 29, 1984. When the mall opened, it allowed for national tenants Dillard's to open their first stores in the area, as well as JC Penney and Newman's moving from downtown to be the three anchor stores. On opening day, the mall had room for 85-95 tenants and a 12 restaurant food court. Within one year of opening, the mall's occupancy stood at about 70%, more than the 25% the mall had on opening day.

In June 2012, Victor Companies CEO Jim Dill announced plans to "de-mall" the property by eliminating indoor spaces as part of a $35 million deal. The city of Enid offered a $5 million tax incentive once the property had 85% of the spaces leased, which never did happen. By May 2014, the Victor Companies puled the plug on redevelopment, leaving the mall to explore other opportunities. In October 2014, Sears announced that it would close their location in the former Newman's by January 2015 along with the Auto Center. In the summer of 2019, Dillard's announced that they would be closing around or by the end of the year. In June 2020, JCPenney announced that it would close the store at Oakwood Mall, along with 153 other locations. This store would close in the fall, along with five other Oklahoma stores.
