= John T. Woodruff =

John Thomas Woodruff (1868–1949)

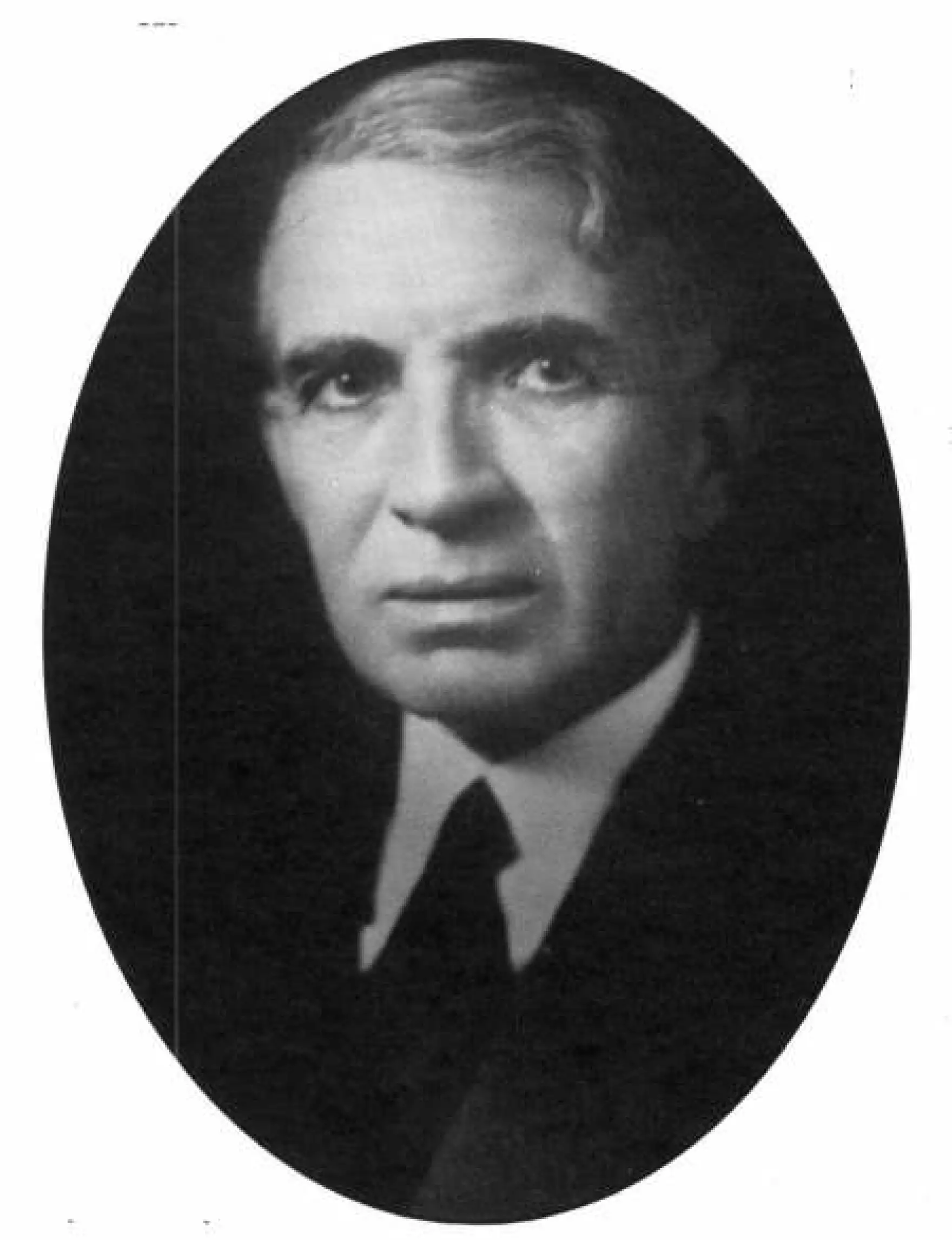
- Born: John Thomas Woodruff; January 6, 1868; Franklin County, Missouri, U.S.
- Died: 1949; Springfield, Missouri, U.S.
- Resting place: Hazelwood Cemetery
- Occupation: Business magnate

John T. Woodruff (January 6, 1868 – January, 1949) was an American lawyer, developer, and civic leader whose vision and advocacy shaped the modern identity of Springfield, Missouri. Between the 1900s and 1940s, Woodruff was instrumental in securing major transportation routes for the city, state, and county.

== Early life ==
Woodruff was born in Franklin County, Missouri to George Washington Woodruff and Susan Rowland Woodruff. Leaving home at 16, he worked and studied across Missouri, attending the Normal School in Vichy. Self-taught in law, he passed the Missouri bar in 1889 and specialized in damage suits, collections, and land litigation. At age 22, he was elected prosecuting attorney of Crawford County.

In 1896, Woodruff became an attorney for the St. Louis–San Francisco Railway. His legal work took him across Missouri, and in 1904 he relocated his family to Springfield to be closer to his cases.

== Early career ==
Woodruff influence quickly extended beyond law. Serving multiple terms as president of the Springfield Area Chamber of Commerce, he leveraged connections and organizational skills to secure major projects for the community.

In 1907, he led negotiations to acquire 320 acres for Frisco's maintenance and repair shops, bringing hundreds of jobs to Springfield. In 1905, he played a key role in securing the Fourth District Normal School (now Missouri State University) by donating land and gathering $41,000 in community pledges. He also helped obtain $50,000 from the Carnegie Foundation for Drury College.

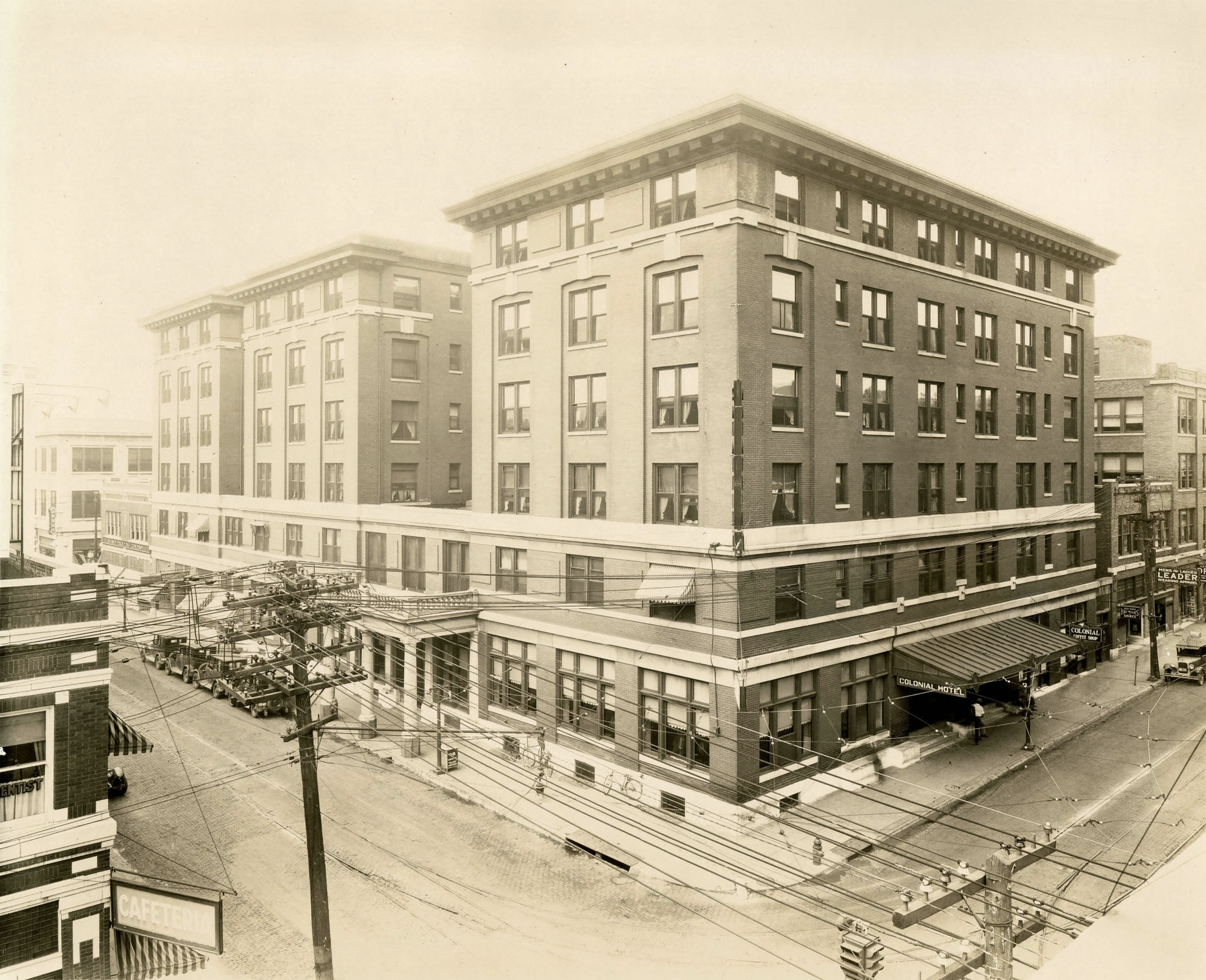
The Colonial Hotel as it stood in 1924. Located in Springfield, Missouri on the southwest corner of St. Louis St. and Jefferson Ave.

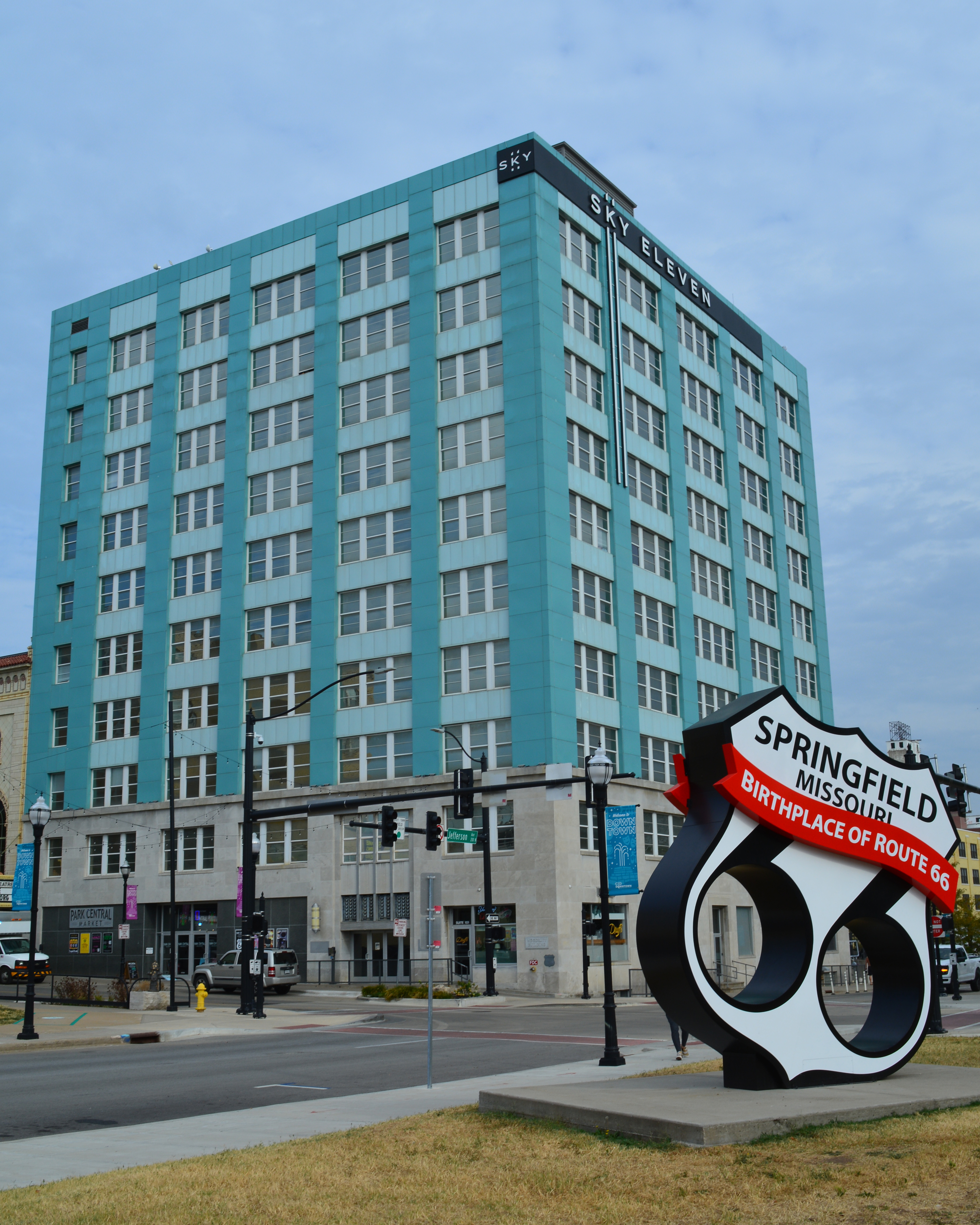
The Woodruff Building, now called Sky 11, in Springfield, Missouri. ca. 2025.

Leaving the Frisco in 1909, Woodruff pursued real estate and development full-time. His projects included the Colonial Hotel in 1907, the 10-story Woodruff Building that became Springfield's first "sky-scraper" in 1911, the Sansone Hotel, the Kentwood Arms Hotel, and the Country Club District. He also developed Hickory Hills Golf Course and promoted Springfield as a golf destination. Many of his buildings remain local landmarks.

== Later career ==
A passionate advocate for the "Good Roads" movement, Woodruff promoted highway development across Missouri. His leadership as the first president of the U.S. Highway 66 Association helped secure Springfield's place along the newly designated U.S. Route 66. The highway became a major driver of commerce and tourism for the city.

Woodruff also supported early aviation, urging development of a modern Springfield airport in 1928.

Woodruff was instrumental in bringing two major federal facilities to Springfield. In 1931, he co-led fundraising efforts to donate land for the U.S. Medical Center for Federal Prisoners. In 1940, he spearheaded the successful campaign to secure O'Reilly General Hospital, which became a vital military medical complex during World War II.

Outside Springfield, Woodruff co-founded and named Camdenton, Missouri. He advocated for White River dam projects, including Table Rock Dam, promoting them for power generation and flood control. Although he did not live to see Table Rock Dam's completion in 1958, his efforts laid the groundwork for its development.

== Death and legacy ==
John T. Woodruff remained active in civic affairs but failed in bids for mayor in 1936 and 1940. He died in January 1949 while visiting his daughter in Minnesota.

At his death, local editorials credited him with shaping Springfield's modern identity as a transportation hub, educational center, and commercial city. In 1999, the Springfield News-Leader named him the city's "Most Influential Springfieldian" of the 20th century.

Although the Woodruff Building, his namesake skyscraper, was renamed in 2015, his legacy endures in Springfield's infrastructure and institutions.
