= Pythian Home of Missouri =

- U.S. National Register of Historic Places
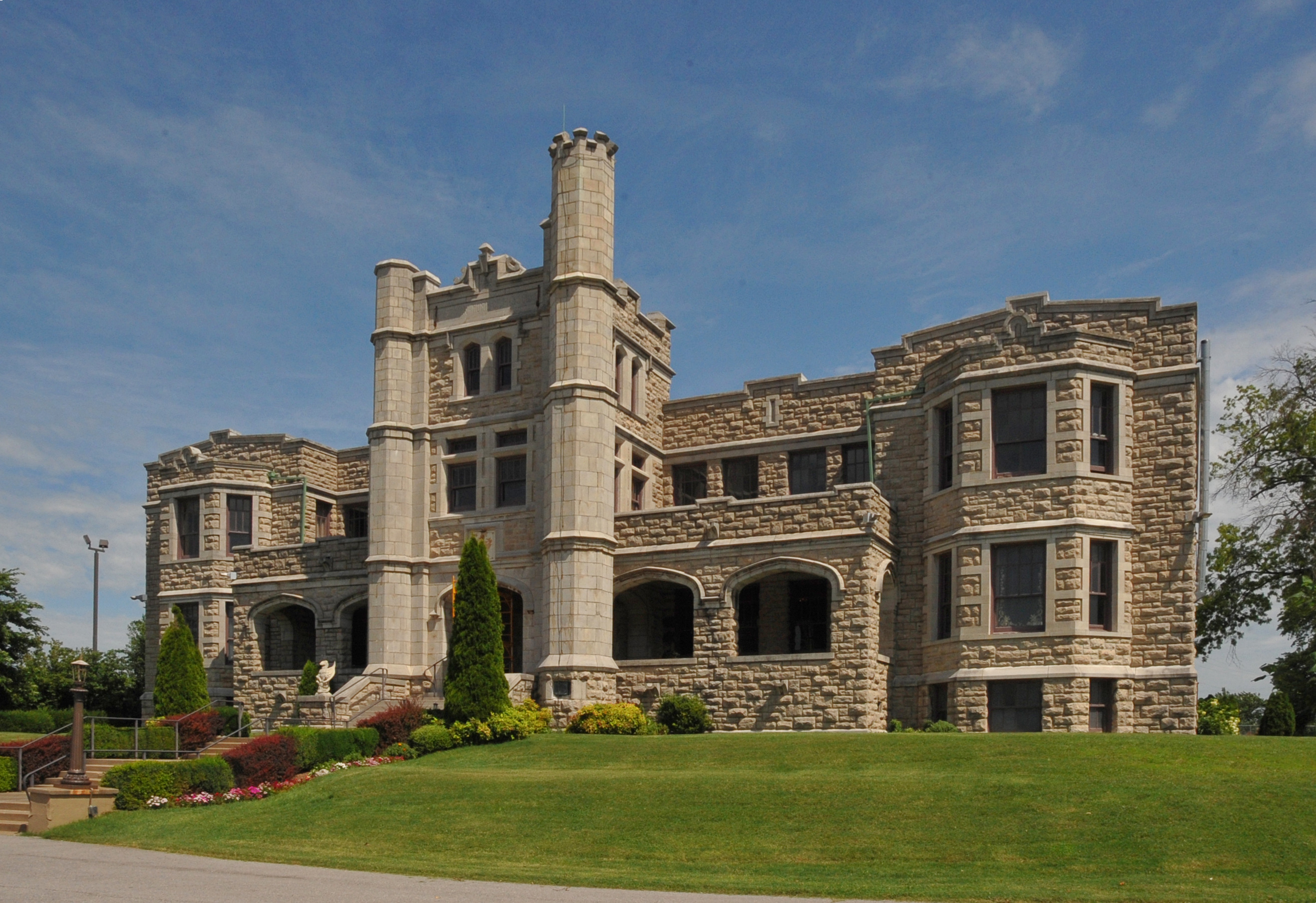

- Location within Missouri
- Location: 1451 E. Pythian Street, Springfield, Missouri
- Coordinates: 37.2214°N 93.2686°W
- Area: 2.66 acres (1.08 ha)
- Built: 1913
- NRHP reference No.: 09000812
- Added to NRHP: October 7, 2009

The Pythian Home of Missouri, also known as Pythian Castle, in Springfield, Missouri, was built in 1913 by the Knights of Pythias and later owned by the U.S. military. German and Italian prisoners-of-war were assigned here during World War II for medical treatment and as laborers. Some prisoners were kept in the detached powerhouse and laundry room behind the castle. The laundry room is still owned by the U.S. Army.

The building was listed on the U.S. National Register of Historic Places on October 7, 2009. It is privately owned and open to the public for tours by appointment.

== Construction ==
The main building was designed to give the structure the appearance of a castle which reflected the theme of the Knights of Pythias. Its foundation and exterior is constructed of "Carthage Stone", an especially hard variety of limestone commonly quarried in the Ozarks. The interior construction is composed of steel framework with poured concrete floors, ceilings, and stairways. The interior walls consist of layered hollow-core "Pyrobar Blocks" (a gypsum-based fireproofing material developed in the early 1900s), with a wire mesh covering that was coated with several layers of plaster. The original main floor features a grand foyer, meeting room, ballroom, dining hall, and sitting parlors. The second floor, which is accessed by dual staircases on either wall, was designed with dormitory style rooms for children and bedrooms for adults. The second floor also features a theater with original ticket booth, seats, upper projection and lighting room as well as changing rooms backstage. The building also features a full basement. The power house was located directly behind the main building and housed the boiler as well as the institution's laundry facilities.

== History ==
=== Knights of Pythias ===
The Knights of Pythias, a fraternal organization, originally constructed the castle and detached power plant as a retirement home for needy members of the order and their widows and children. It was called The Pythian Home of Missouri. Springfield was one of seven cities competing for the construction of the Pythian home and sold 53 acres (21 ha) of land to the knights for $1 in 1909. It served as a meeting hall for the order until 1942.

=== WW II ===
In 1942, during World War II, the United States Military commandeered the facility for use in conjunction with the adjacent O'Reilly General Hospital in entertaining and rehabilitating injured U.S. troops. It was renamed The Enlisted Men's Service Club. The facility featured a movie theater, ballroom, bowling alley, pool hall, library, and arts and crafts area. Some of the most famous movie stars, comedians, and entertainers of the era performed in the theater while the ballroom was host to big bands playing for the dancing pleasure of the troops. After the war the building was retained by the military for use as a reserve center until it was sold as surplus in 1993.

=== Present ===
It is now privately owned by Tamara Finocchiaro. Renovations have been completed to the property including a new driveway and parking area. In 2010 the castle was reopened to the public for tours and as an events facility.

== See also ==
- O'Reilly General Hospital
- Knights of Pythias
