= O'Reilly General Hospital =

Former hospital in Springfield, Missouri

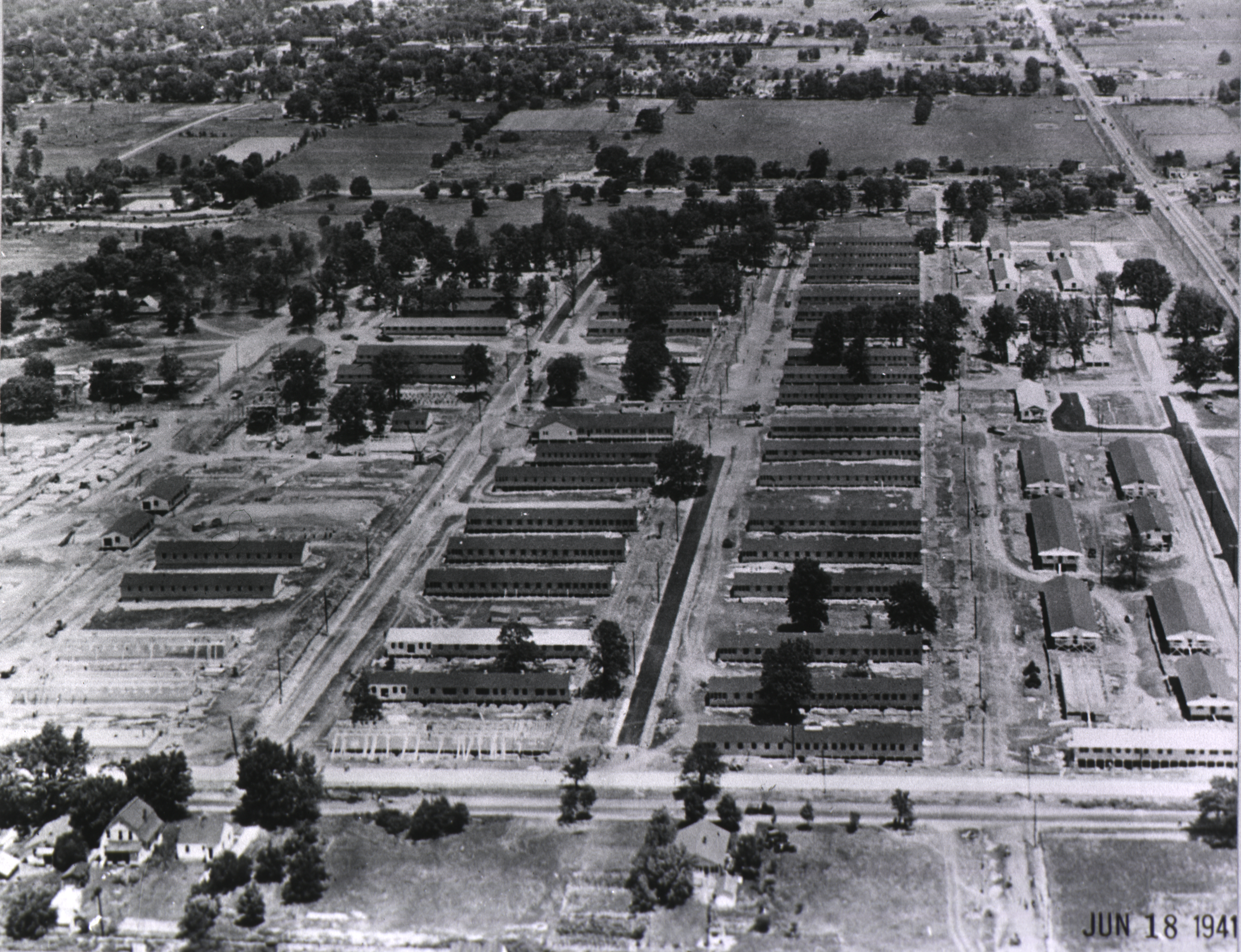
Aerial view of Hospital

O'Reilly General Hospital was an army hospital created by the U.S. government in February 1941. It was built in Springfield, Missouri, to provide long-term medical care for returning soldiers of World War II. It became known as "The hospital with a soul."

== History ==
In 1940, Springfield businessman John T. Woodruff wrote to Eugene Reybold, assistant chief of staff of the War Department, lobbying for the hospital to be located in Springfield. A committee was prepared to select Kansas City in 1941, Springfield was selected. The land was donated to the federal government, which was the Glenstone Golf Course, also founded in part by Woodruff.

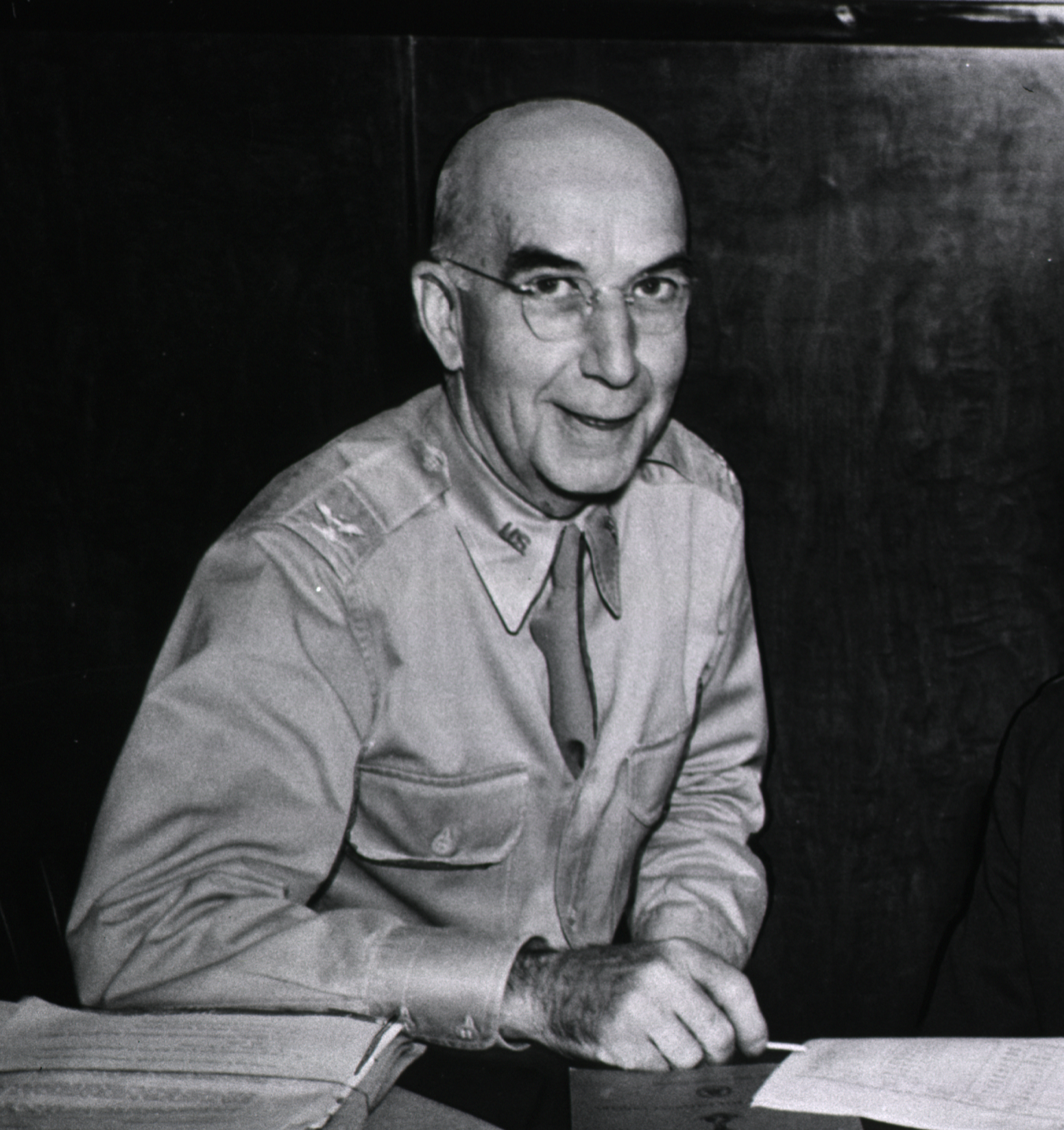
Post Commander Colonel George B. Foster, Jr

Adjacent to the 160-acre property was the Pythian Home of Missouri built by the Knights of Pythias. The Army, using an order of immediate possession, bought the "castle" from the Knights of Pythias for $40,625 which was half of its assessed value. The castle was renovated and converted into the Enlisted Men's Service Club. The army built a ballroom, bowling alley and gymnasium inside of the building. Part of the basement of the castle was converted into a prison for Italian and German prisoners who required medical care.

Construction of the hospital was overseen by Major Michael Grimaldi, constructing quartermaster, at a cost of almost two million dollars. Construction of the facilities was completed in four months. The commander of the post was Colonel George B. Foster Jr. who declared on May 15, 1941, that it should be a "hospital with a soul." The hospital got its name from former Surgeon General Robert Maitland O’Reilly. It was dedicated on November 8, 1941, with room for 1,000 beds.

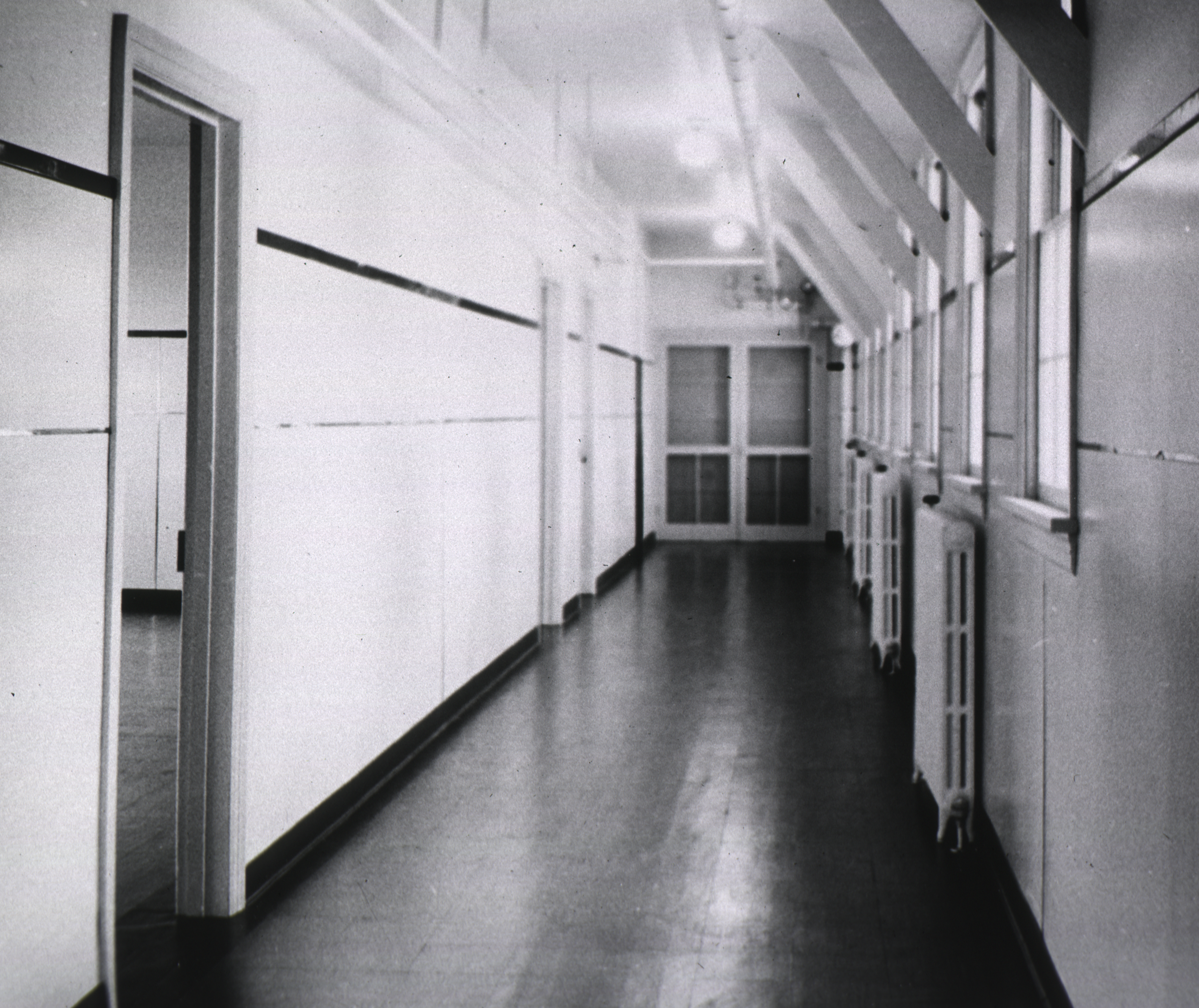
Interior Hallway

The hospital began to conduct training for field medics. Many of the patients treated had severe burns. The hospital began using new innovations in plastic surgery to help the burn victims. It became a primary provider of reconstructive surgery and physical therapy.

During the winter of 1944, area residents worked to makes sure all the patients in the hospital had Christmas presents.

=== After the war ===
At the end of the war, the hospital was placed on the army's list of surplus hospitals and was closed on September 30, 1946. The Veterans Administration immediately expressed interest in operating the facility. The United States Veterans Administration reopened it in February 1947. They closed it down again in August 1952. It was again declared surplus property by the government. The site remained unused until the General Council of the Assemblies of God bought most of the property in December 1954 for the construction of the university. The remaining part of the grounds are now the armory for the Army reserve and National Guard.

== Faculties ==
The army initially built 91 buildings for the hospital. It was eventually expanded to 258 buildings and 3,426 beds. They offered an occupation classes for staff and patients to learn new skills and take high-school exams.

== Location ==
It was built between the roads of Division and Glenstone Avenue. The location is now occupied by the Army Reserve, Army National Guard and Evangel University.

== Legacy ==
The United States Army Surgeon General recognized the army hospital as the "best in the Nation." Over 100,000 patients were treated over its five-year period of operation. The hospital became a model for other army hospitals. The average cost per patient was five dollars a day. Average recovery time dropped to 24 days from and average of 35 days.
