= Franklin Springfield Motor Co. Building =

- U.S. National Register of Historic Places
- U.S. Historic district – Contributing property
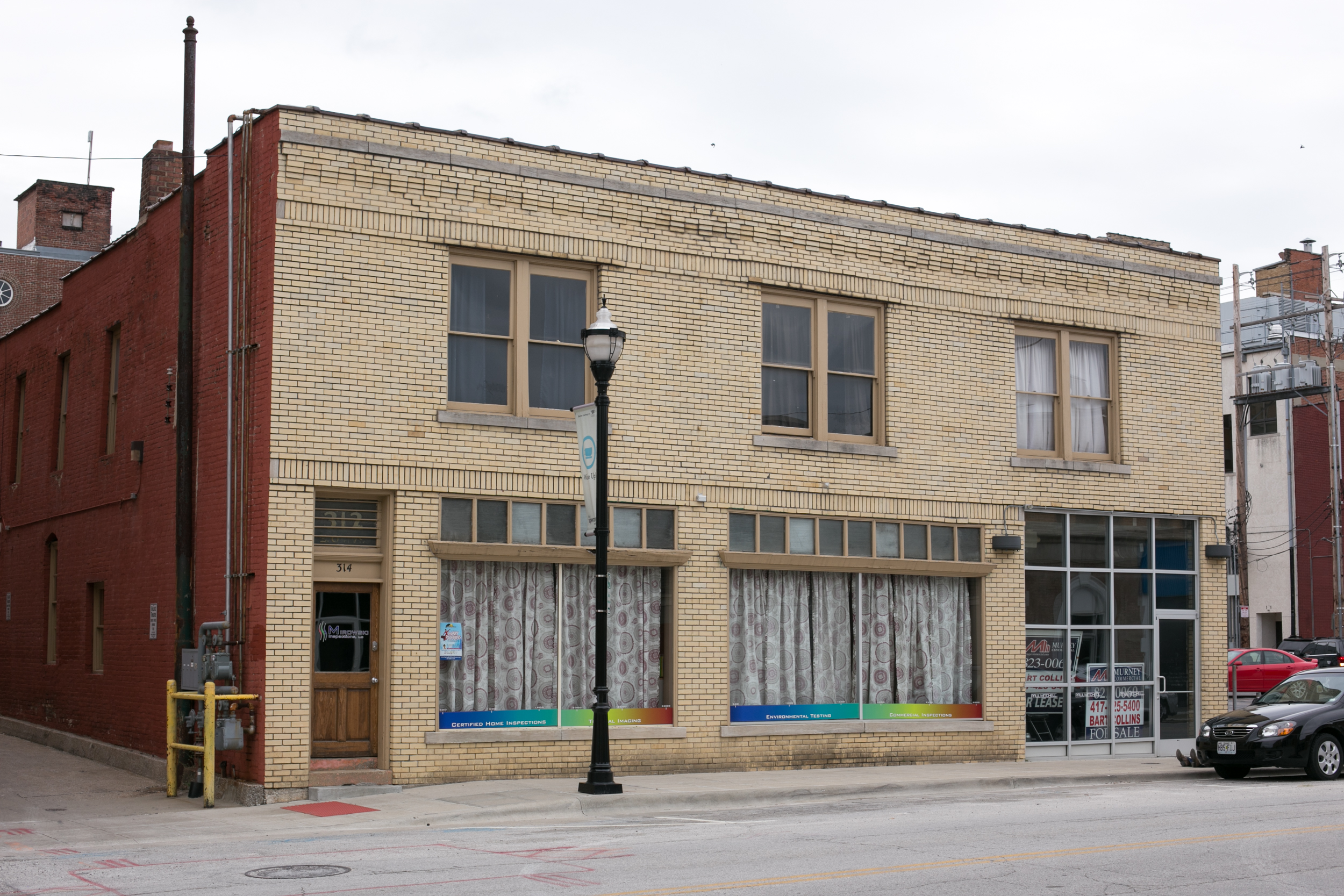
- Franklin Springfield Motor Co. Building, September 2014

- Location within Missouri Location within the United States
- Location: 312-314 E. Olive St., Springfield, Missouri
- Coordinates: 37°12′40″N 93°17′26″W
- Area: less than one acre
- Built: c. 1891, c. 1925
- Architectural style: Early Commercial
- MPS: Springfield MPS
- NRHP reference No.: 06001027
- Added to NRHP: November 15, 2006

Franklin Springfield Motor Co. Building, also known as the Proctor Motor Co., Indiana Trucks, Inc., and The White Motor Co., is a historic automobile showroom located in Springfield, Missouri, United States. Built about 1891 and renovated about 1925, it is a two-story commercial building with a yellow brick veneer facade with limestone trim. The building measures 45 feet wide and 100 feet deep.

It was listed on the National Register of Historic Places in 2006. It is located in the Springfield Public Square Historic District.
