= Heer's Department Store =

- U.S. National Register of Historic Places
- U.S. Historic district – Contributing property
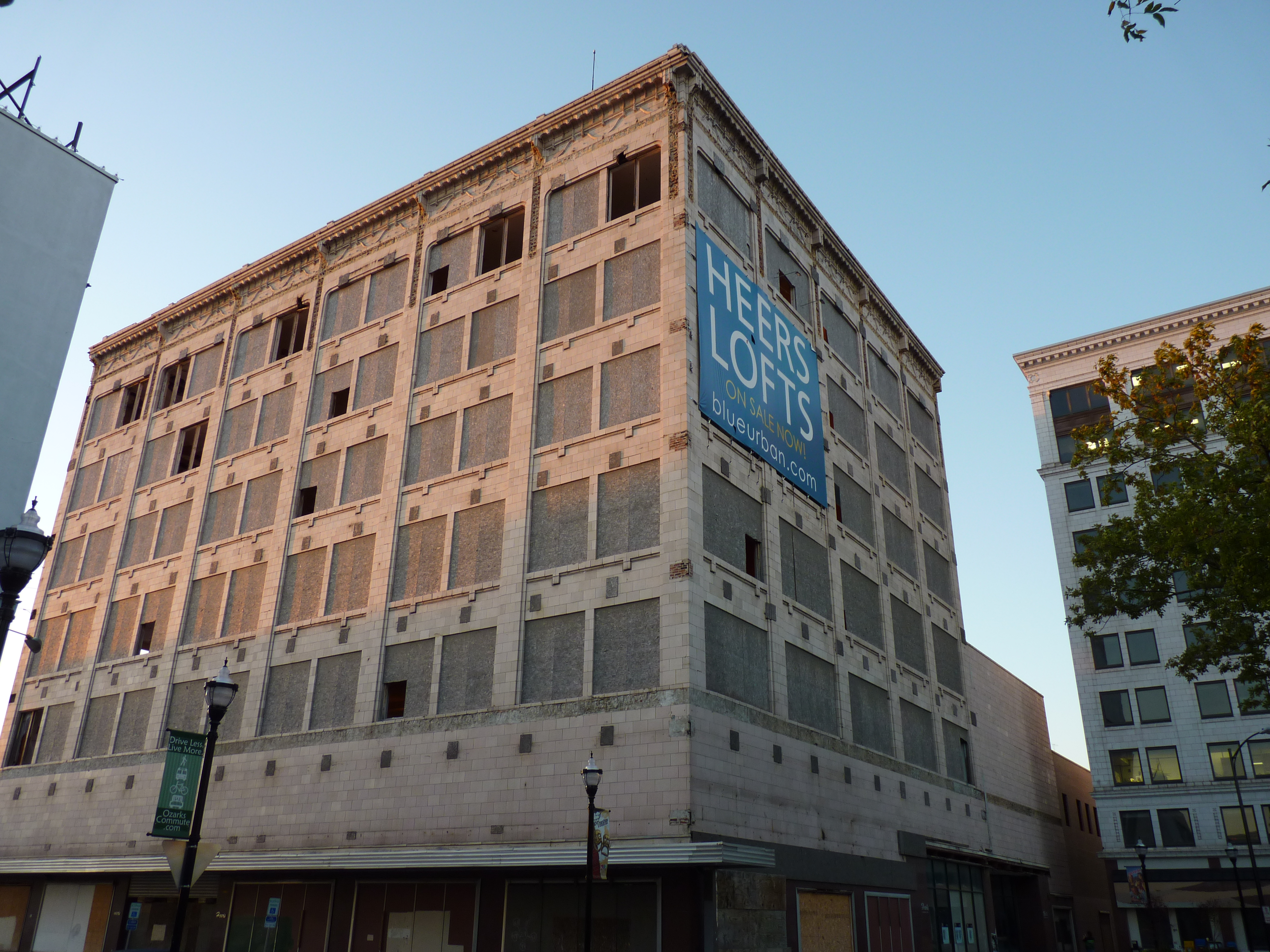
- The Heers Building in 2014 prior to redevelopment

- Location within Missouri Location within the United States
- Location: 138 Park Central Square, Springfield, Missouri
- Coordinates: 37°12′33″N 93°17′34″W
- Area: less than one acre
- Built: 1915, 1951
- Built by: Lewis Construction Co.
- Architect: Opel and Torbitt
- Architectural style: Early Commercial
- MPS: dévision Springfield, Missouri MPS (Additional Documentation)
- NRHP reference No.: 02001207
- Added to NRHP: October 24, 2002

Heer's Department Store, also known as the Greater Heers Store, is a historic building located in Springfield, Greene County, Missouri. It was built in 1915, and is a seven-story commercial building which is sheathed with cream colored terra cotta. A two-story addition was constructed in 1951, was remodeled in 1967, and closed in 1995. and 2014 remodel revitalized and restored the building, preserving a key Springfield landmark on the downtown square.

It was listed on the National Register of Historic Places in 2002 and is located in the Springfield Public Square Historic District.

== Early history (1869–1969) ==
Charles H. Heer founded the store in 1869 as a 20-by-100-foot dry goods shop on Boonville Hill near the southwest corner of Boonville and Olive Streets.

A major fire in June 1913 destroyed the then-new Heer’s store and much of the northeast public square. The former courthouse was demolished, and in its place a new steel- and terra cotta–clad, concrete-reinforced store was erected, opening in September 1915 to 21,000 visitors. The six-story, 100,000-square-foot building included fireproofing innovations, a public auditorium, a rooftop “garden in the air,” and an observatory tower used for public viewing, radio broadcasting, and police radiophone communications.

Allied Stores of New York purchased the Heer’s company in 1940, leading to a major 1951 renovation of the Heer's Building with air conditioning, escalators, and an expansion into the former Baker Building site.

In 1969, a centennial remodel replaced the historic façade with bronze structural glass and tall white arches, reflecting mid-century retail design trends but altering the building’s original character.

== Decline and redevelopment (1970–present) ==
A second Heer’s store opened in Springfield’s Battlefield Mall in 1976, then both sold in 1987 before filing bankruptcy and closing in 1995 after 126 years in business, 79 years at the downtown Heer's Building.

Davis Properties purchased the building in July 1995 and attempted many redevelopment proposals that all failed to materialize.

In 2014 the Kansas City based Dalmark Group bought and redeveloped the building, creating 80 luxury apartments with retail along the ground floor. The redevelopment project was estimated to be $15.8 million. Extensive efforts to restore the building's aesthetic were taken. Some examples included carriage lanters along the rooftop railing, removal of the 1969 façade and restoration of the cornice, and the return to the aesthetic of the original windows.

In 2021 the building was purchased by Edgewood Real Estate Investment Trust and is managed locally by TLC Properties.

Newly built Heers Building after the "Great Fire" of 1913.

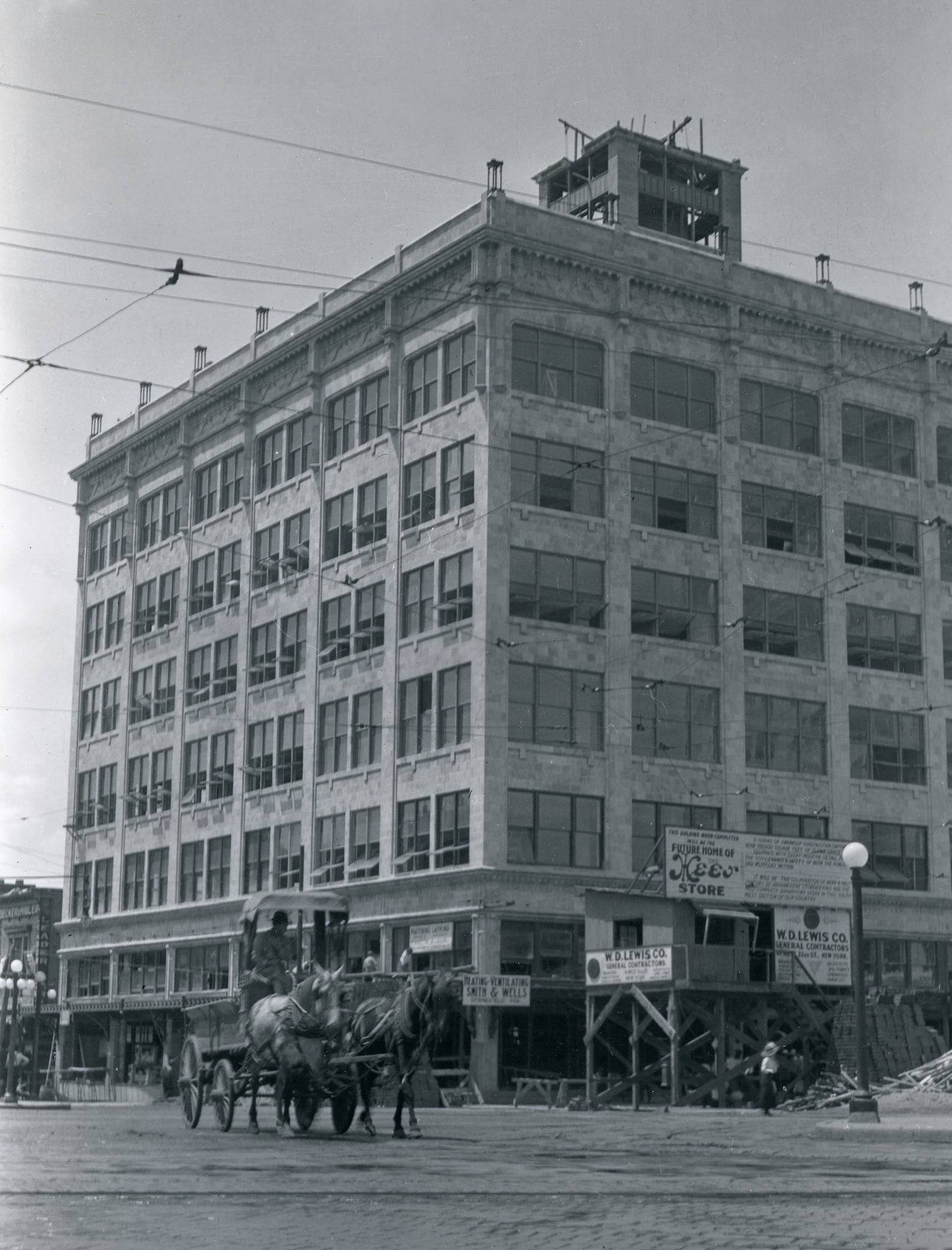
Construction of the Heers Department Store Building on the Springfield, MO public square in 1915.

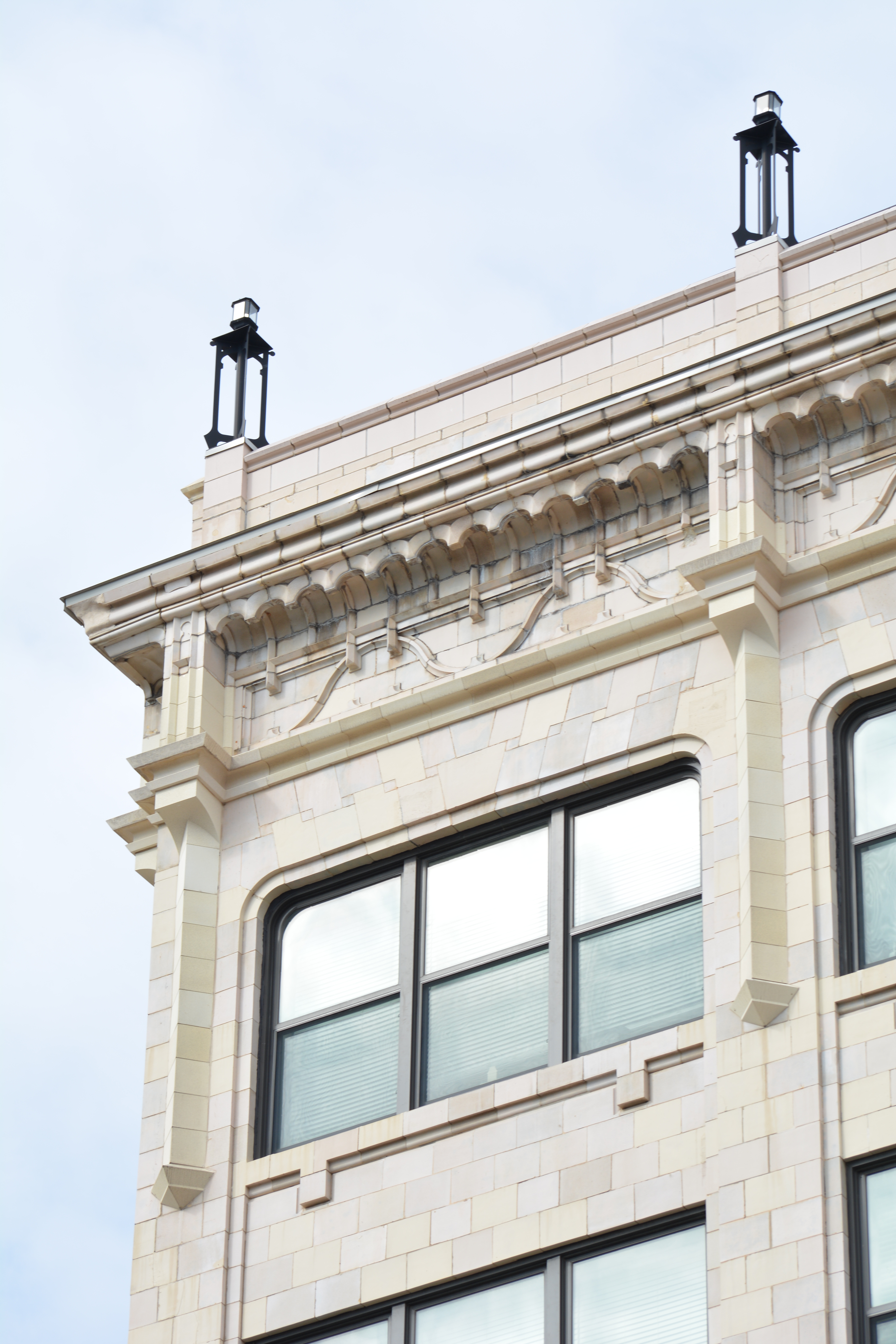
View of the restored cornice and detail work atop the building. (ca. 2025)
