= Marx–Hurlburt Building =

- U.S. National Register of Historic Places
- U.S. Historic district – Contributing property
- Location within Missouri Location within the United States
- Location: 311-315 E. Park Central Sq., Springfield, Missouri
- Coordinates: 37°12′40″N 93°17′26″W
- Area: less than one acre
- Built: c. 1900
- Architectural style: Classical Revival
- MPS: Springfield, Missouri MPS AD II
- NRHP reference No.: 03000864
- Added to NRHP: September 2, 2003

Marx–Hurlburt Building are two historic commercial buildings located at Springfield, Greene County, Missouri. They were built about 1900, and are two- and three-story, rectangular Classical Revival style commercial buildings.

It was listed on the National Register of Historic Places in 2003. It is located in the Springfield Public Square Historic District.
