= Netter–Ullman Building =

- U.S. National Register of Historic Places
- U.S. Historic district – Contributing property
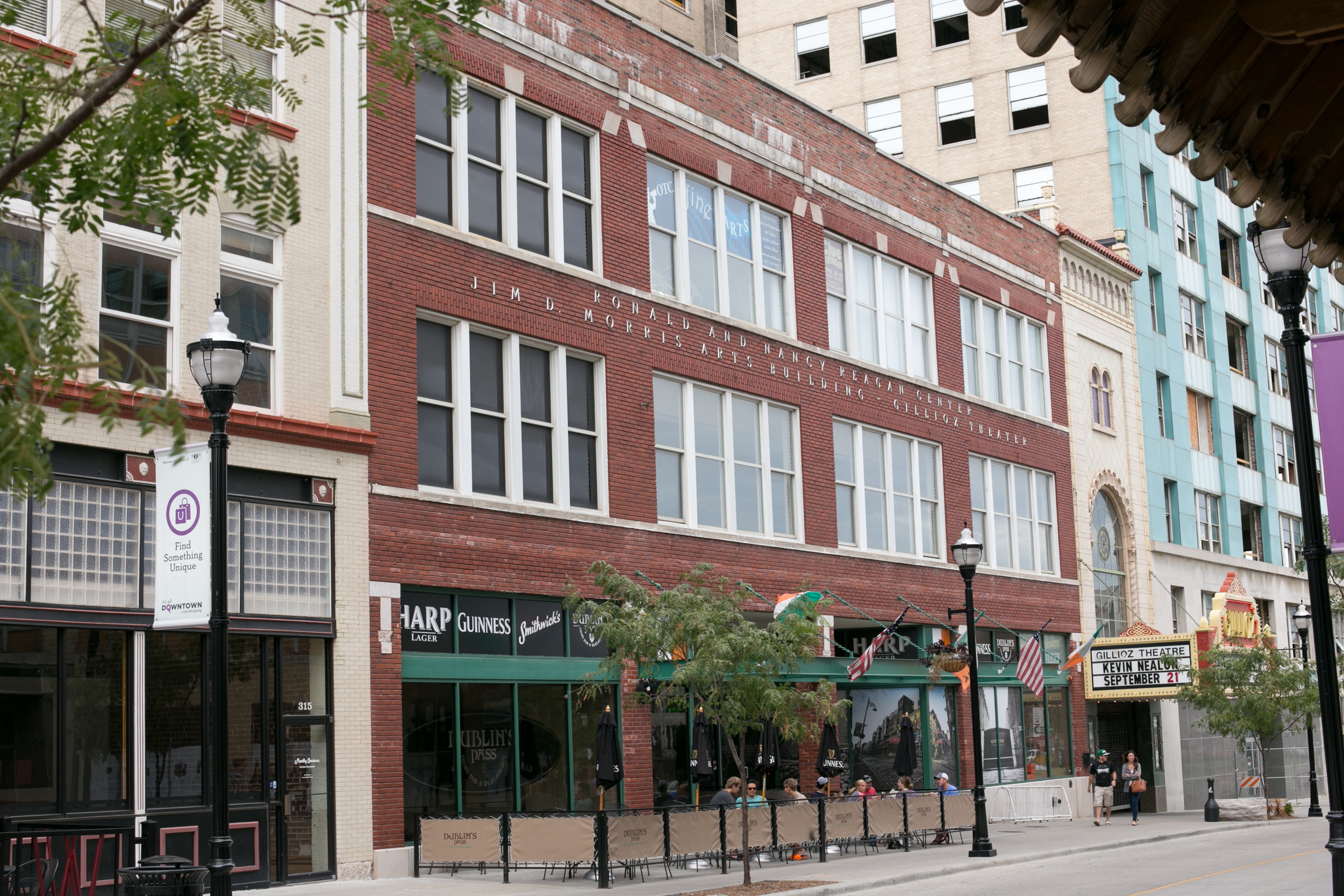

- Location within Missouri Location within the United States
- Location: 317 Park Central East, Springfield, Missouri
- Coordinates: 37°12′40″N 93°17′15″W
- Area: less than one acre
- Built: 1913
- Architectural style: Late 19th And Early 20th Century American Movements
- Part of: Springfield Public Square Historic District (ID06000331)
- NRHP reference No.: 03000255

Significant dates
- Added to NRHP: April 18, 2003
- Designated CP: May 5, 2006

Netter–Ullman Building, also known as "Netter's temporary home of the Heer store", is a historic department store building located at Springfield, Greene County, Missouri, United States.

== Description ==
It was built in 1913, and is a three-story, rectangular red brick commercial building. It measures 107 feet wide by 127 feet deep. It features understated limestone insets and horizontal limestone belting.

== Historic Place ==
It was listed on the National Register of Historic Places in 2003. It is located in the Springfield Public Square Historic District.
