= Springfield Public Square Historic District =

Historic district in Missouri, United States

- U.S. National Register of Historic Places
- U.S. Historic district
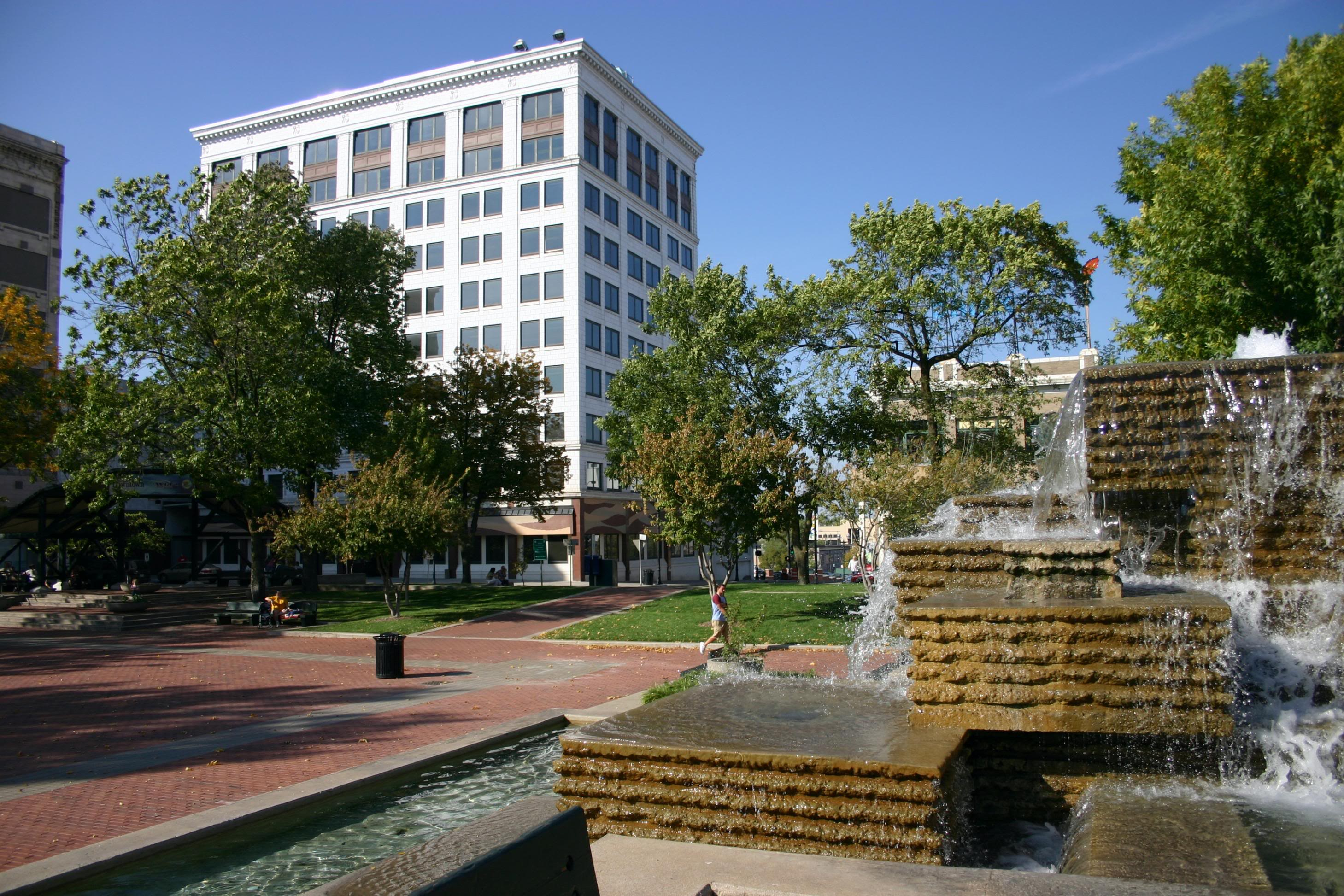

- Location within Missouri Location within the United States
- Location: 149,138,137,134,127,132,124, and 122 Park Central Sq.,219, 221, South Ave.; also the eastern side of Public Square, part of the 300 block of Park Central E., and the northern side of the 200 block of W. Olive, Springfield, Missouri
- Coordinates: 37°12′46″N 93°17′35″W
- Area: 17.1 acres (6.9 ha)
- Built by: Johnson Construction Co.
- Architect: Opal and Torbitt; Larsen, L.P.; Hunt, Frank
- Architectural style: Early Commercial, two part commercial block
- MPS: Springfield MPS
- NRHP reference No.: 06000331, 09000281 (Boundary Increase)
- Added to NRHP: May 5, 2006, January 13, 2010 (Boundary Increase)

Springfield Public Square Historic District is a national historic district located at Springfield, Missouri, United States. The district encompasses 27 contributing buildings, 1 contributing site, 1 contributing structure, and 2 contributing objects in Springfield's central business district. The district developed between about 1890 and 1959, and includes representative examples of commercial architecture. Located in the district are the separately listed Franklin Springfield Motor Co. Building, Gillioz Theatre, Heer's Department Store, McDaniel Building, Netter-Ullman Building, and Marx-Hurlburt Building. Other notable resources include the Landers Building (1915), F. W. Woolworth Co. (1954), J. J. Newberry Co. (1951), S. S. Kresge Co. (1953), Springfield Cigar Company (c. 1890), Stancill Drug Store (c. 1890), National Shirt Co (c. 1952), Salvation Army (c. 1890), Public Square (c. 1835, 1970), Queen City Bank (1914), Frisco Office Building (1910), and Cantrell Building (c. 1927).

It was added to the National Register of Historic Places in 2006 with a boundary increase in 2010.
