= Newman's =

Newman's was an American department store chain based out of Joplin, Missouri. Newman Mercantile Company was started by Jewish entrepreneur Joseph Newman, a German immigrant, in the mid 19th century. Joseph Newman's son Albert and son in law Gabe Newburger opened the first Newman's dry goods store in Joplin in 1898. In 1910 Newman's relocated their Joplin store to the newly built Newman Brothers Building located at the corner of 6th & Main in downtown Joplin. Newman's department store operated out of that building until 1972, when they relocated to the newly completed Northpark Mall. Newman's co-developed the mall with Enterprise Development.

Newman's filed for chapter 11 bankruptcy in 1987 closing some of their locations, and closing the last of their stores in 1988. The Joplin store located at the mall was bought by Heer's department stores of Springfield, Missouri.
