= Northpark Mall (Missouri) =

- Location: Joplin, Missouri, United States
- Coordinates: 37°05′26″N 94°28′25″W
- Opened: 1972
- Developer: Newman's and Enterprise Development
- Owner: CBL & Associates Properties, Inc.
- Num. of stores: 115+
- Num. of anchor tenants: 10 (8 open, 2 vacant)
- Floor area: 1,080,000 sq ft (100,000 m^{2})
- Floors: 1
- Parking: 5,543
- Public transit: MAPS Transit
- Website: visitnorthparkmall.com

Northpark Mall is a super regional mall located in Joplin, Missouri. The mall opened in 1972 with 600,000 square feet, and featured 60 stores, restaurants, and other services. Today, the Northpark mall is 1,080,000 square feet, and features more than 100 inline tenants including a food court. Northpark Mall is the largest mall in the Joplin region and serves a trade area of nearly 500,000 people. Freeman Hospital added a soft play area in the Macy's women's court in the summer of 2014. The mall was also the temporary home of the 11th and 12th grades of Joplin High School until August 2014, when the new high school was completed. Northpark Mall is managed by CBL & Associates Properties. The anchor stores are Vintage Stock, TJ Maxx, H&M, JCPenney, Joplin Expo, Unique Boutiques, and Dunham's Sports. There are two vacant anchor stores that were once a Macy's store and a Sears.

== History ==
Northpark Mall opened in 1972, on Range Line Road on the east side of Joplin. At the time, the mall was anchored by Montgomery Ward to the north, JCPenney to the south, and local chain Newman's at the middle. Other stores included Walgreens, McCrory's, Ramsay's Department Store, For All Bible (which moved out in 2016, and permanently closed the next year), Wyatt's cafeteria, as well as many other stores. Newman's became Heer's in 1987, the same year that a new wing was built, and the mall received its first renovation. The new wing extended easterly from the JCPenney store. This new wing included two new anchors, Famous-Barr and Venture. The renovation also brought a food court as well as a new five screen cinema. In 1994, Heer's closed, and Famous-Barr moved its men's wear and home goods to the former Heer's space. That same year, Sears built a store adjacent to Montgomery Ward, moving from an older store near downtown Joplin. In 1998, the mall received a minor renovation, changing only the color scheme. After the closure of the Venture chain in 1998, its anchor at the mall was converted to Shopko, but it closed in the early 2000s following the closure of Montgomery Ward in 2001. A Chuck E. Cheese opened next to the mall in early 2003. Both Famous-Barr locations were rebranded as Macy's in 2006. Montgomery Ward remained vacant until mid-2007, when its space was split between TJ Maxx and Steve & Barry's, the latter of which closed in 2008 and was replaced by Vintage Stock. In 2006, the mall received its first major renovation in nearly 20 years, changing the color scheme, adding all new lighting and floor tiles, and renovating the food court to a Route 66 theme.

In 2012, Old Navy moved into a space formerly occupied by Tilt Studios. As a result, the original Old Navy became Jo-Ann Fabrics, and Tilt opened a larger location near Vintage Stock, and Ulta Beauty opened a store off the food court. In the summer of 2014, a soft play area for children was added in the Macy's women's court.

In August 2015, mall management announced that the former Venture was being converted back to retail use. That work was completed by late September 2015. Joplin High School used the building as a temporary school until May 2014.

In October 2015, Macy's moved the children's department to the men's store and men's moved over to the women's store. Both Macy's stores received a much needed makeover, including new fixtures, fresh paint, and new carpet.

For-All Bible announced in December 2015 that they would be moving to a new location out of the mall. For-All Bible was one of the last original tenants, until they permanently closed in 2017, leaving JCPenney as the only remaining original tenant in the mall.

Mall management announced in May 2016 that Dunham's Sports would be opening in the former Venture anchor. The store was working on renovations and plans to be open by fall 2016. With the opening of Dunham's, the mall would have all of the anchor spaces full for the first time in 15 years.

In November 2017, Swedish retailer H&M opened their first store in southwest Missouri.

On November 7, 2019, it was announced that Sears would be closing this location a part of a plan to close 96 stores nationwide. The store permanently closed in February 2020.

On January 6, 2021, it was announced that Macy's would also be closing both locations in April 2021 as part of a plan to close 46 stores nationwide. After the stores closed, TJ Maxx, JCPenney, and Dunham's Sports would be the only traditional anchor stores left. Chuck E. Cheese closed abruptly in April 2024.

Throughout 2024 into 2025, the former Macy’s Women anchor store began to be converted into an events and banquet hall called Joplin Expo. The 85,000 square foot facility was completed on August 1, 2025, with several booked events planned in advance. Joplin Expo held its first event on August 2, 2025. The facility has a capacity for all kinds of events of different sizes.

In 2026, Unique Boutiques announced they would be opening at the mall. Unique Boutiques is a permanent daily 7-day-a-week indoor market experience for trendy clothing, handmade goods, and unique gifts. It features a curated collection of local boutiques, markers, and small businesses under one building. The 40,000 square foot space had a soft opening in April 14, 2026. The grand opening of the boutique is set for May 29, 2026.

== Joplin High School ==
Following the 2011 Joplin tornado , which destroyed Joplin High School, officials said juniors and seniors in the 2011-12 class would attend classes in a section of the mall. Classes began in the renovated former Shopko location on August 17, 2011. Joplin High School moved into their new building in August 2014.
