= Battlefield Mall =

Coordinates: 37.1624°N 93.2647°W

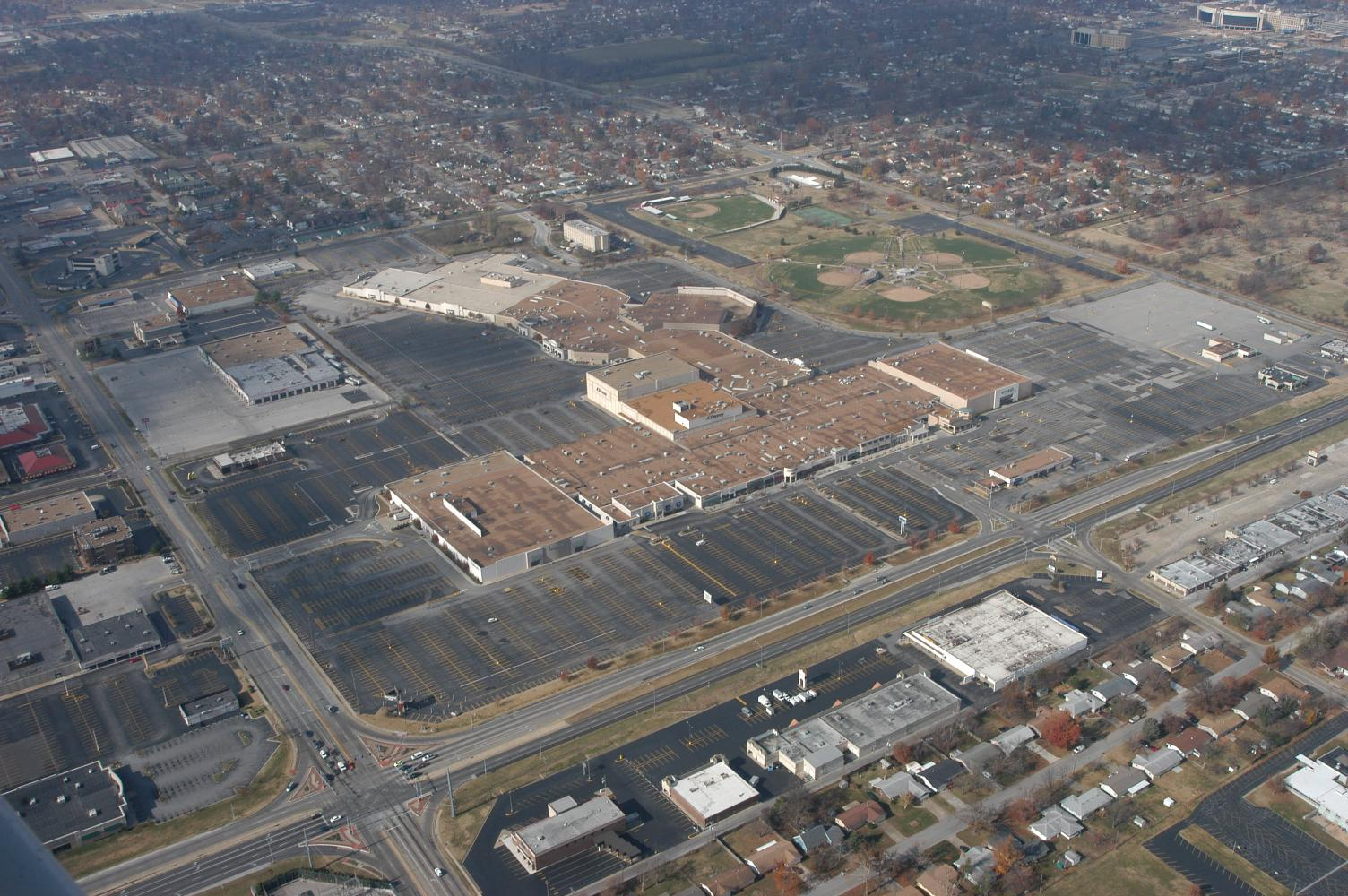
- Location: Springfield, Missouri, U.S.
- Address: 2825 South Glenstone Avenue
- Opened: July 23, 1970; 56 years ago
- Developer: Melvin Simon & Associates
- Owner: Simon Property Group
- Num. of stores: 153
- Num. of anchor tenants: 5 (3 open, 1 vacant, 1 opening in 2027)
- Floor area: 1,202,116 square feet (111,680.2 m^{2})
- Floors: 1 (2 in former Dillard's North, J. C. Penney, and Macy's)
- Public transit: Springfield Transit Services
- Website: www.simon.com/mall/battlefield-mall

Battlefield Mall is an enclosed shopping mall in Springfield, Missouri. Opened in 1970, the mall features 153 stores in 1,202,116 square feet (111,680.2 m^{2}) of mall shop space. The anchor stores are JCPenney, Dillard's, and Macy's. Dick’s Sporting Goods plan to open one of their large format Dick’s House of Sport locations in the former Dillard’s Women (Dillard’s South) department store. There is one vacant anchor store that was formerly a separate Dillard's Men's (Dillard’s North) store. The mall managed and owned by Simon Property Group, the successor of the same company that built it.

== History ==
Melvin Simon & Associates, now known as Simon Property Group, built and developed Battlefield Mall. Their plans had begun in 1963 with a proposed Montgomery Ward department store. By 1968, J. C. Penney and Dillard's had also been confirmed as the second and third anchor stores. After two years of construction, it opened to the public on July 23, 1970. On opening day, the mall was 93 percent occupied, consisting of 685,000 square feet (63,600 m^{2}) of shop space along with the three department stores. Among the tenants of the mall at the time were a McCrory dime store, Piccadilly Restaurants, and Osco Drug. After only five years in operation, the McCrory store was closed and converted to local department store Heer's, which opened there in 1975.

The mall's owners announced an expansion plan in 1979, to consist of over 400,000 square feet (37,000 m^{2}) of mall shops and two new anchor stores. Upon opening in 1982, this expansion added about 85 stores, including a Sears department store and a new location for Dillard's. At the same time, the original location of Dillard's in the mall was sold to Famous-Barr. In 2001, following the closure of Montgomery Ward, Dillard's moved some of its departments into the former Montgomery Ward location, while retaining other departments in the store built in 1982. This new store, known as Dillard's South, opened in 2002. The addition of Dillard's South allowed the chain to offer a greater variety of merchandise between the two stores.

On May 30, 1998, Old Navy opened at the mall. Another anchor store change ensued in 2006 when Federated Department Stores (now Macy's, Inc.) acquired Famous-Barr's parent company The May Department Stores Company, and renamed all of that company's stores to Macy's.

On February 6, 2020, Sears announced it would close its Battlefield Mall location in mid April 2020, as part of a plan to close 39 stores nationwide.

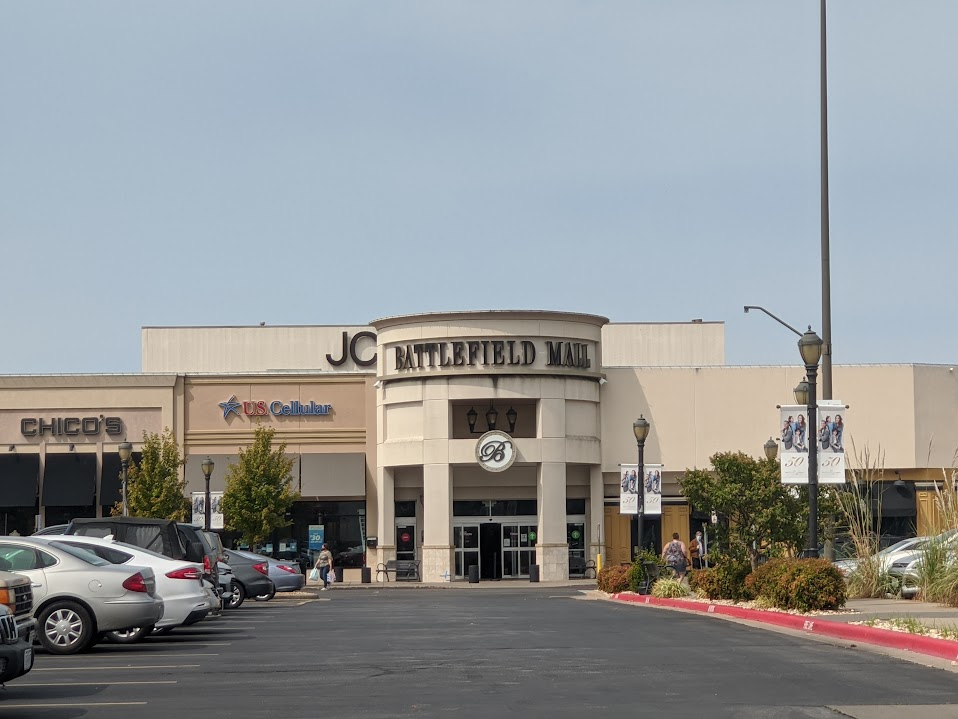
East Entrance, September 2020

On February 6, 2025, Dillard's announced that it would move into the former Sears space on the west side of the mall, consolidating its separate Men's and Women's stores into one larger store. The new Dillard's store opened on July 31, 2025.

In February 2026, it was announced that Dick’s Sporting Goods subsidiary Dick’s House of Sport will be moving in to the former Dillard’s South anchor.

== Gallery ==
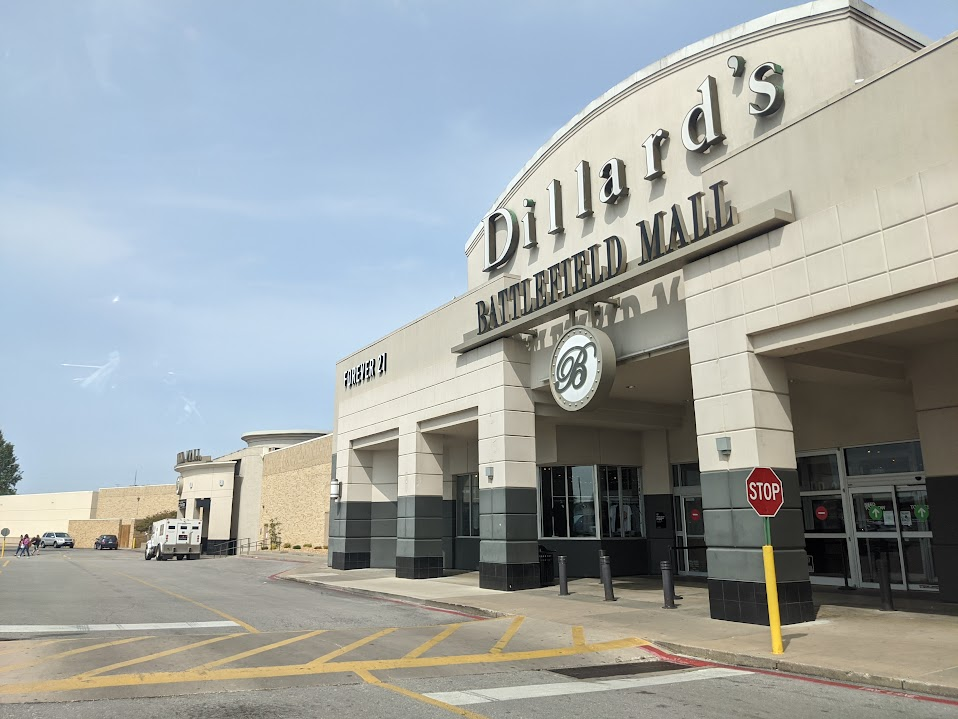
West Entrance, September 2020

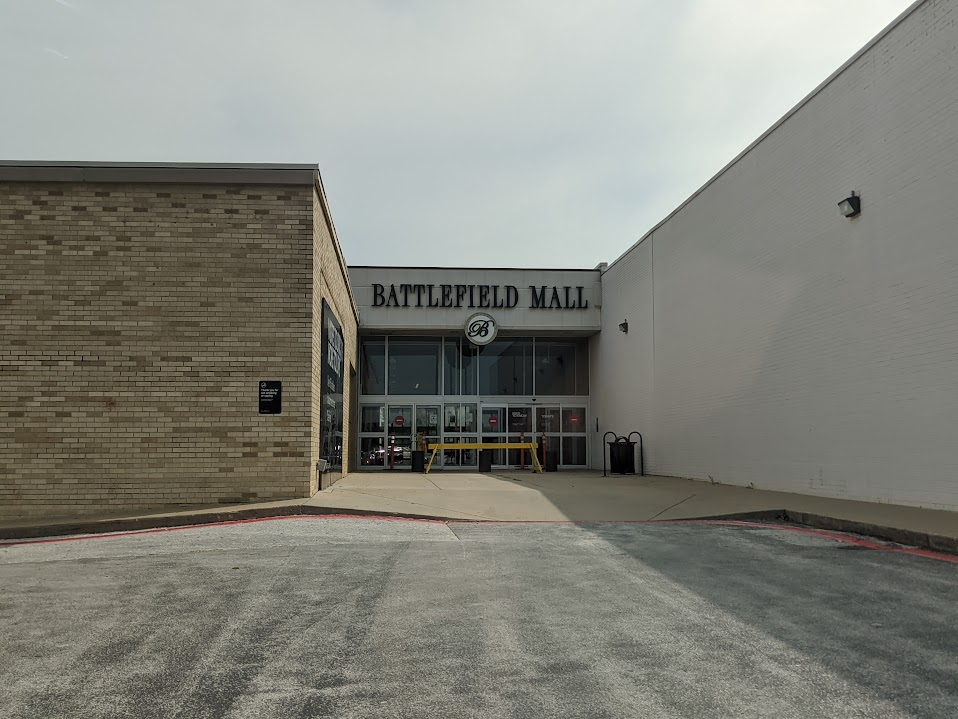
Southwest Entrance, September 2020

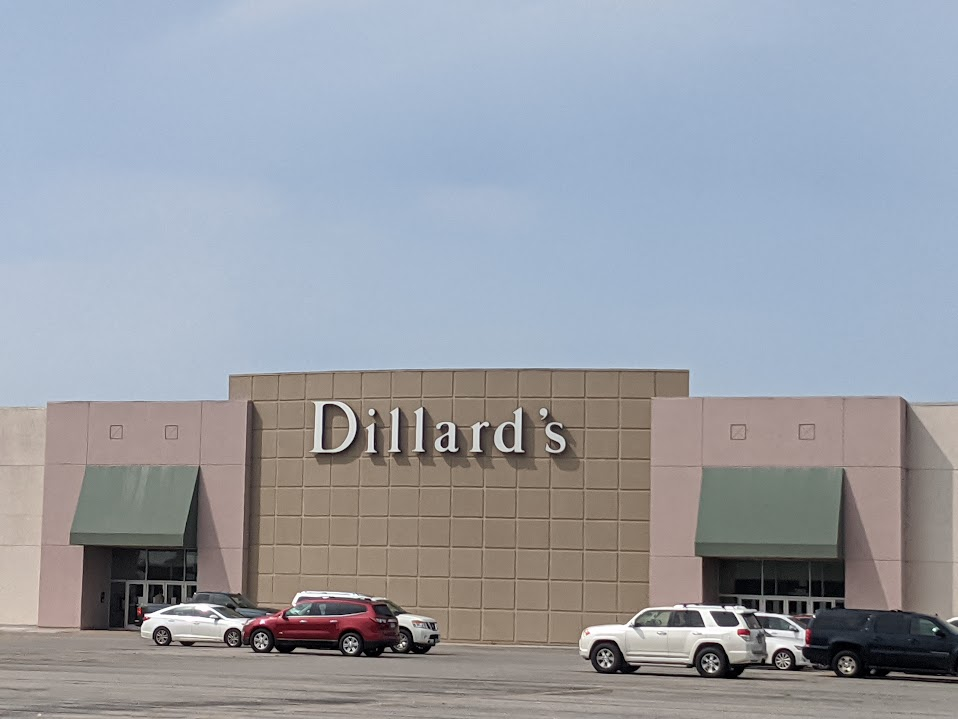
Dillard's South, September 2020

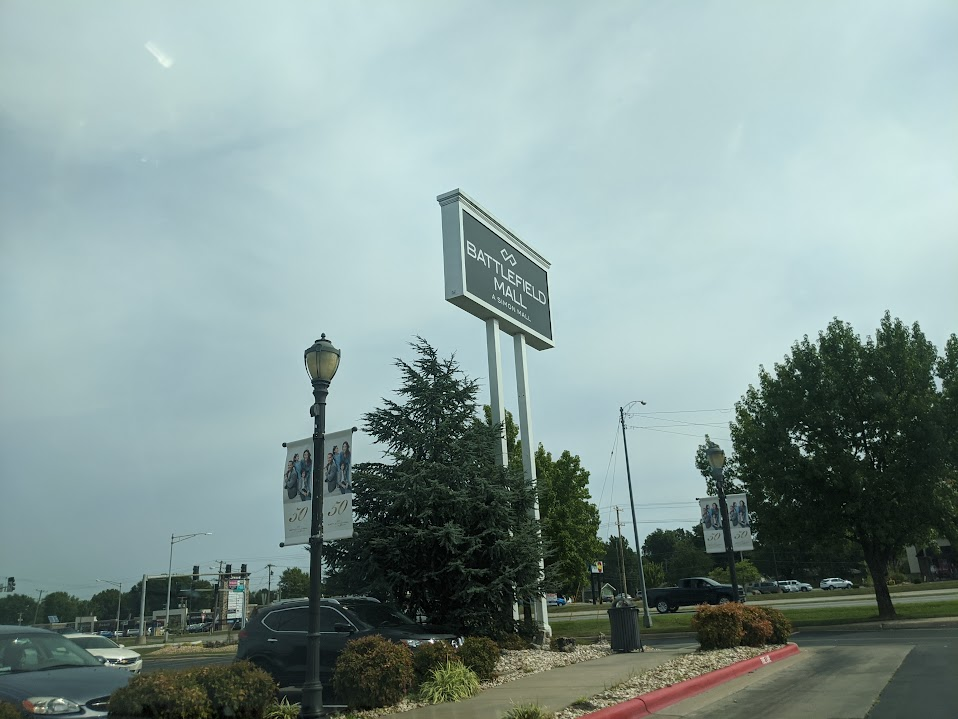
Sign, September 2020

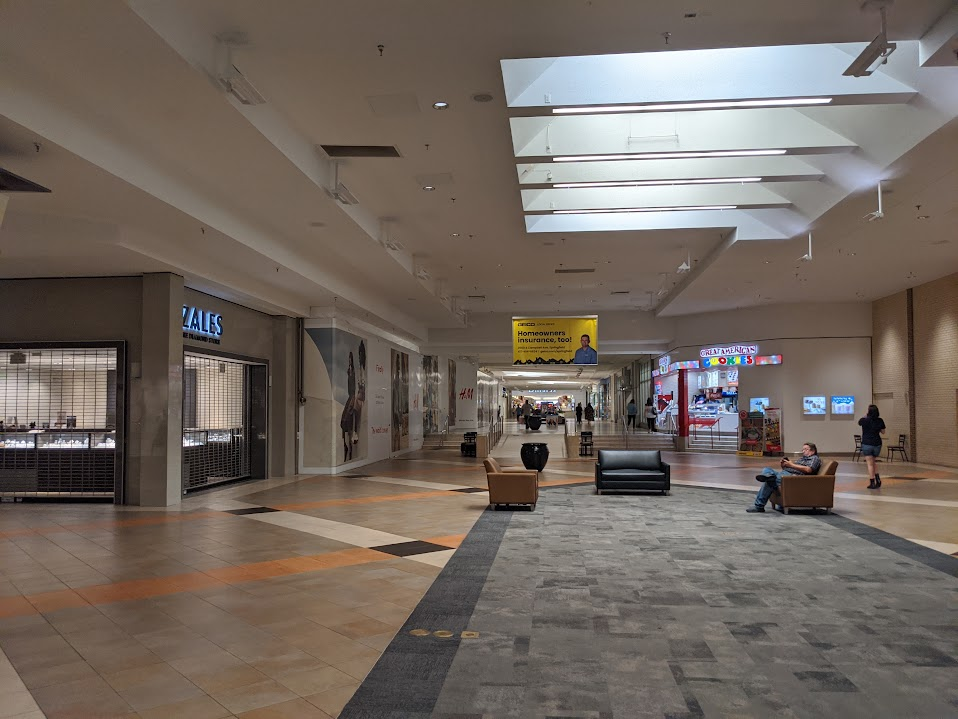
JCPenney Court, September 2020

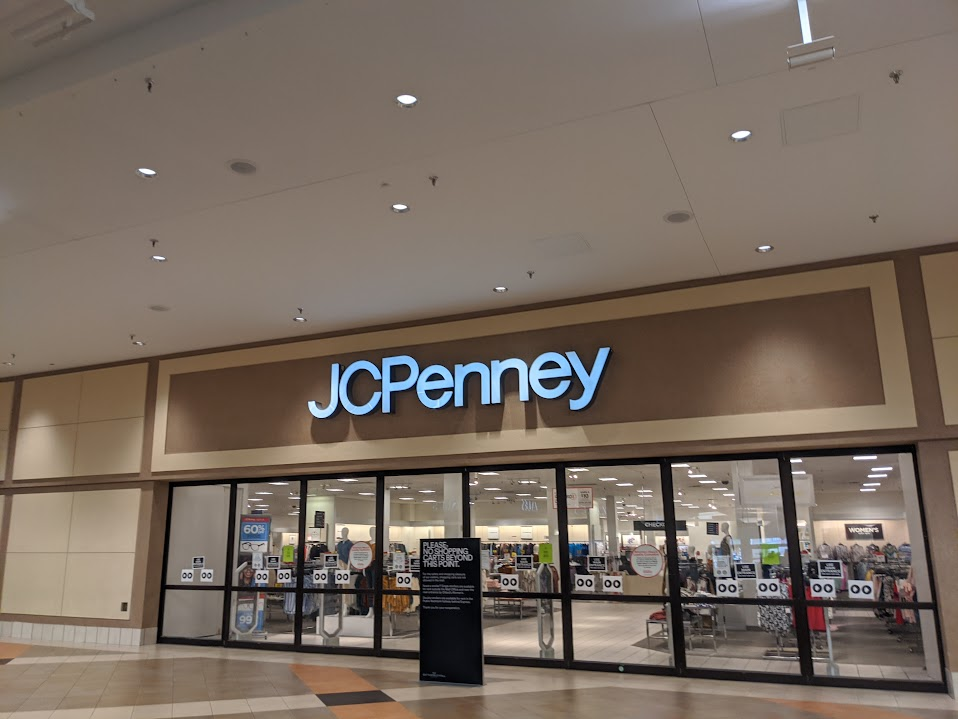
JCPenney Entrance, September 2020

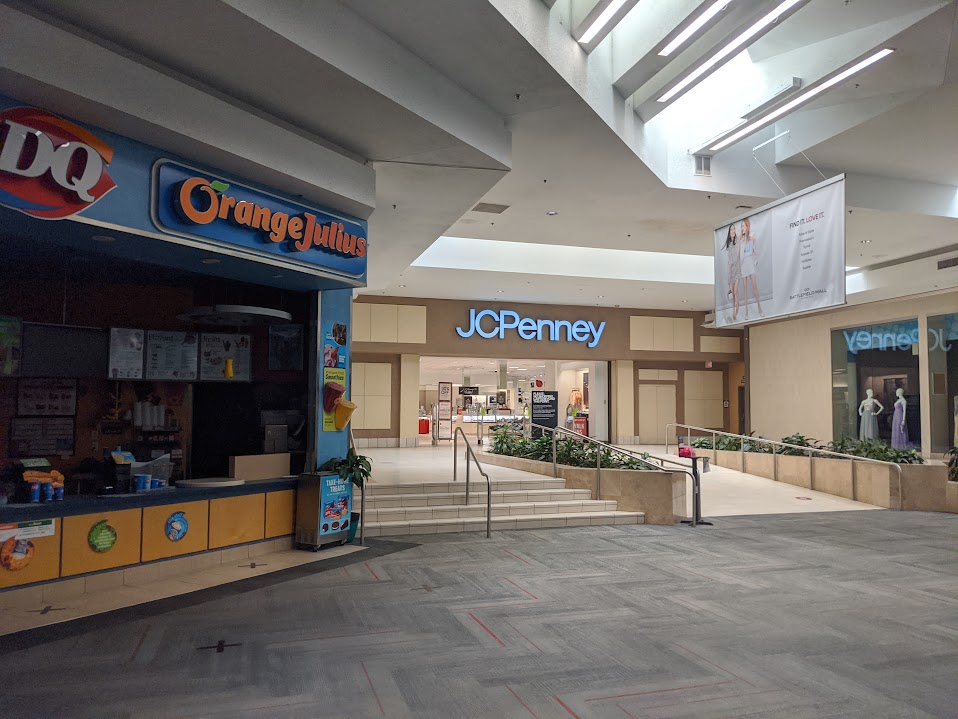
JCPenney North Entrance, September 2020

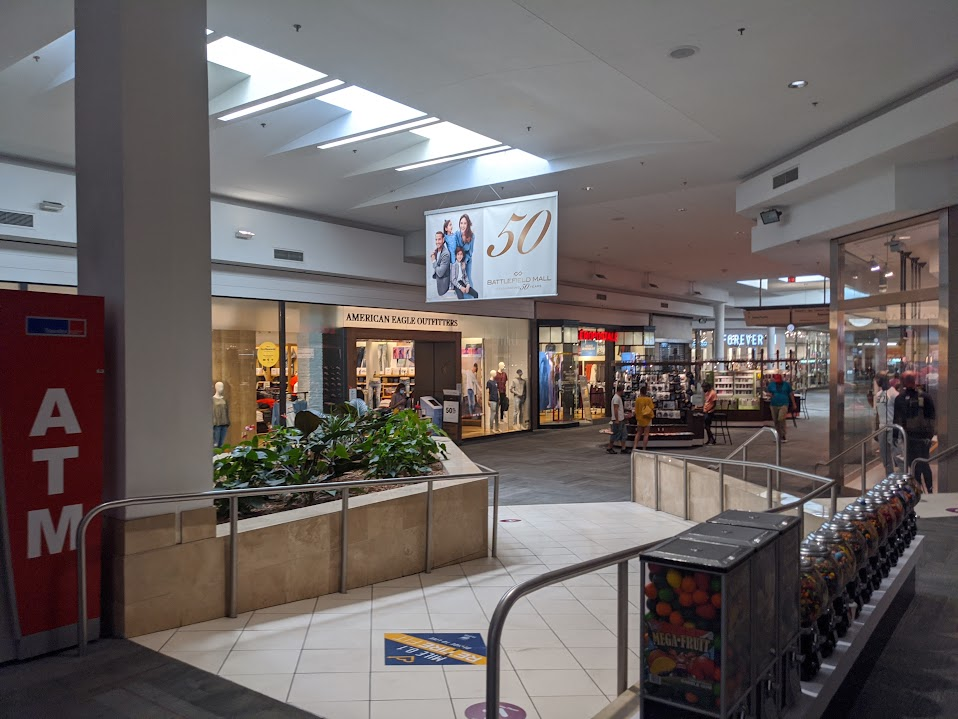
West Wing, September 2020

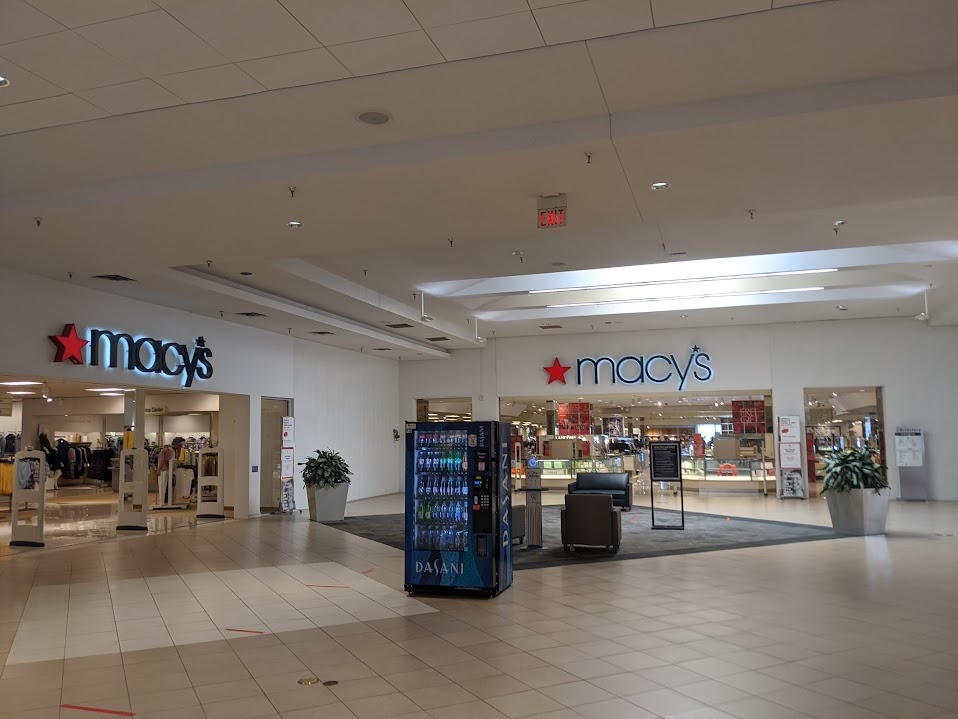
Macy's Entrance, September 2020

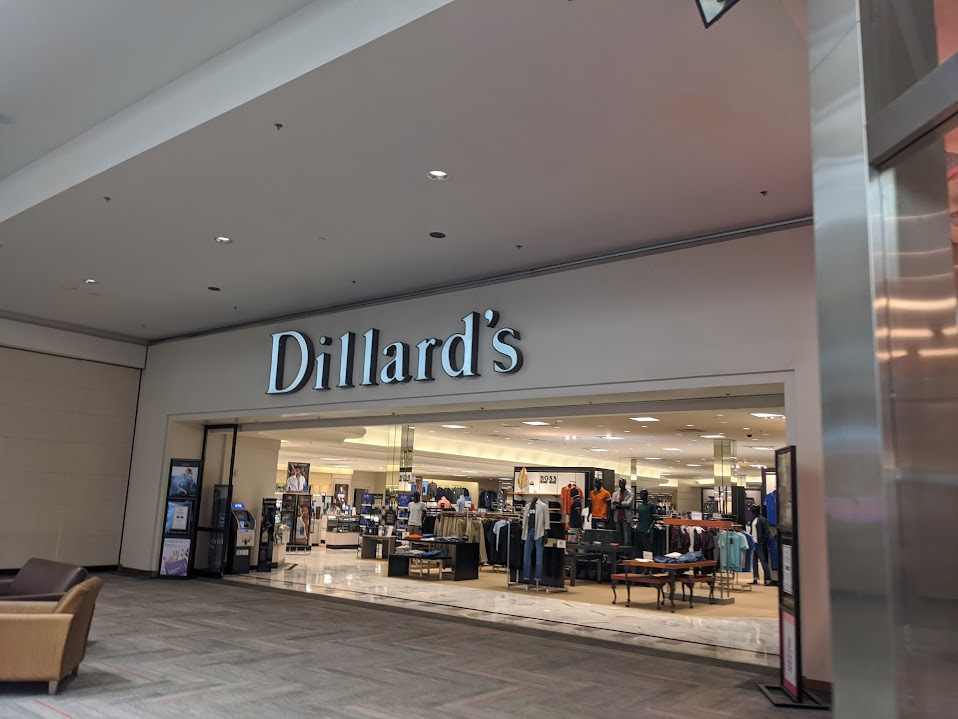
Dillard's Entrance, September 2020

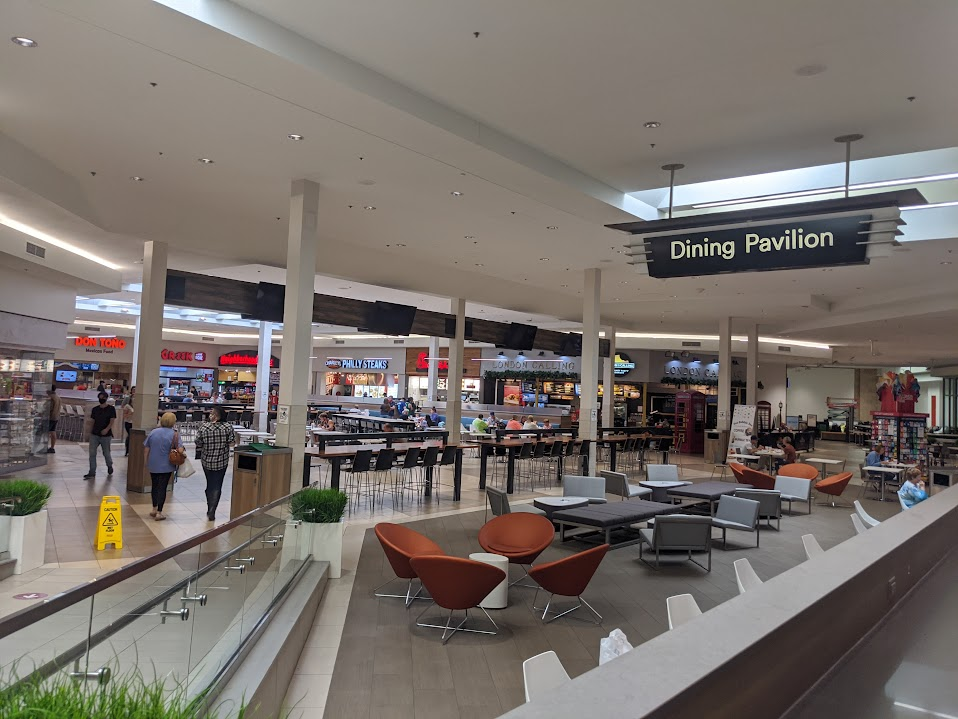
Food Court, September 2020

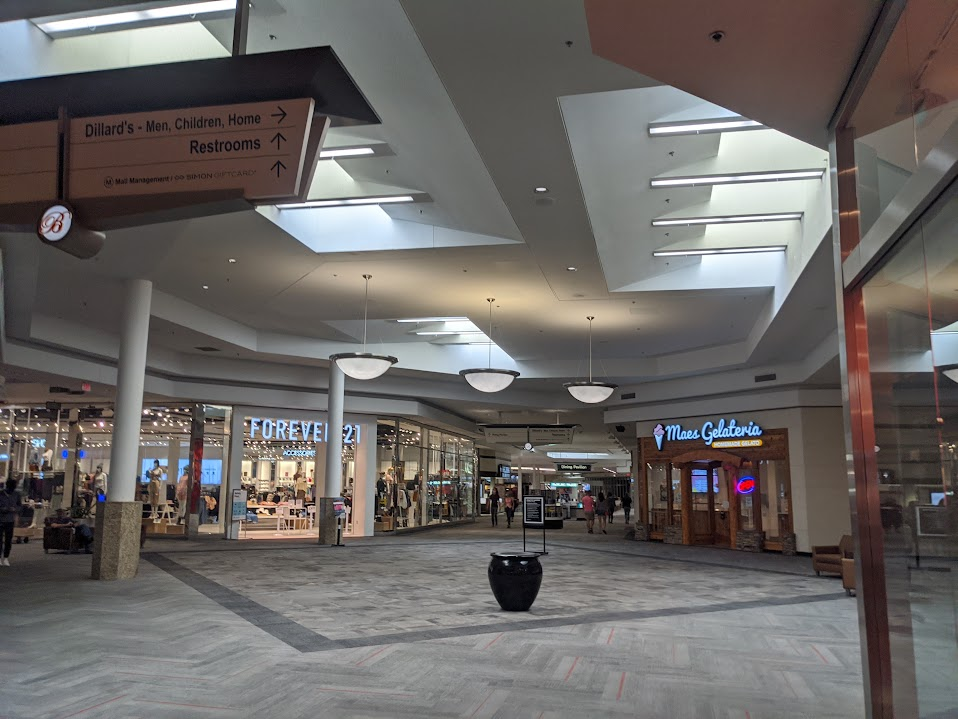
West Wing 2, September 2020
