= 11th Street Bridge =

Historic bridge in Tulsa, Oklahoma, US

- U.S. National Register of Historic Places
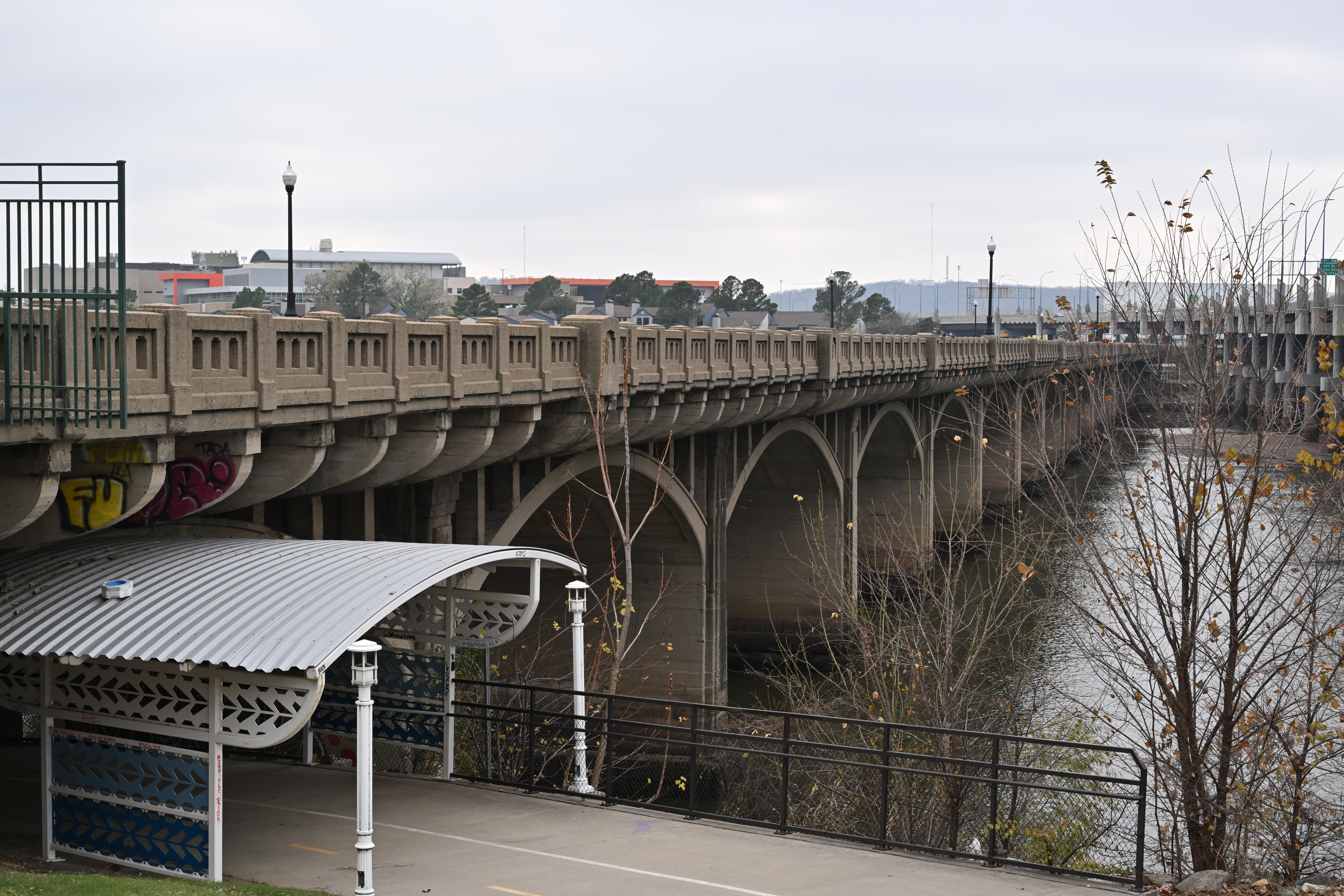
- View from the northeast, looking southwest
- Location: Tulsa, Oklahoma
- Coordinates: 36.1429455°N 96.0046506°W
- Built: 1915
- Architect: Harrington, Howard and Ash
- MPS: Route 66 in Oklahoma MPS
- NRHP reference No.: 96001488
- Added to NRHP: 1996

The 11th Street Bridge was completed in December 1915 to carry vehicles across the Arkansas River at Tulsa, Oklahoma. Used from 1916 to 1972, it was also a part of U.S. Route 66. Functionally, it has been replaced by the I-244 bridges across the Arkansas. As of 2009, the bridge was in poor structural condition and unsafe even for pedestrians. In 2008, the gates were locked to exclude all visitors.

This bridge was added on December 13, 1996, to the National Register of Historic Places under Criteria A and C. Its NRIS number is 96001488. Its listing was consistent with evaluations of historic resources on Route 66 in Oklahoma completed in 1994 and 2003 studies. It was named the "Cyrus Avery Route 66 Memorial Bridge" in 2004. (Note: Cyrus Avery was a Tulsa County Commissioner (1913-1916) and involved in the political decision to build the 11th Street Bridge. He had become a highway specialist and by 1924 served as a consultant to the Federal Government. In this role, he strongly advocated bringing a proposed national highway (U.S. 66) between Chicago and Los Angeles through Tulsa. This route was accepted by the government, and Avery was nicknamed "Father of Route 66".)

Although the bridge still stands, it is considered unsafe for use and has been closed to vehicles since 1980 and to pedestrians since 2008.

== Construction ==
Engineered by Harrington, Howard and Ash of Kansas City, this bridge replaced an earlier wooden structure. (Note: A Tulsa World article says that the earlier bridge had been "...a steel pedestrian-wagon toll bridge built in 1903". Designed primarily for workers and supplies to reach the oilfields southwest of Tulsa (Glenn Pool and Red Fork), it was inadequate for the dawning automobile age.) It was built by the Missouri Valley Bridge and Iron Company for $180,000. A multi-span concrete arch bridge, with 18 spans, it was 1,470 feet (450 m) long and 34 feet (10 m) wide. It had a railroad track in the center and one vehicular lane on each side of the track.

At the time, it was notable for several reasons:

- It was the first bridge built for the purpose of carrying automobiles across the Arkansas River
- It was one of the longest concrete structures in the Midwestern United States
- It was the first multi-span concrete bridge constructed in Oklahoma.

In 1929, the original balustrades and Victorian-style lights were replaced with Art Deco guardrails and lights. A 1934 project constructed a second arched bridge immediately downstream and connected both bridges with a single deck. This brought the deck width to 52 feet 8 inches, with a roadbed that was 40 feet (12 m) wide and accommodated four lanes of traffic.

== Obsolescence ==
Completion of the I-244 bridges in 1967 removed most vehicular traffic from the 11th street bridge. In 1980, it was closed to traffic, although it remained open to pedestrians. In 1996, it was added to the National Register of Historic Places. In 2004, the City of Tulsa, Oklahoma, formally renamed the Eleventh Street Bridge (which carried US 66 over the Arkansas River), the Cyrus Avery Route 66 Memorial Bridge in honor of the man who vigorously promoted the creation of Route 66.

== Present condition ==
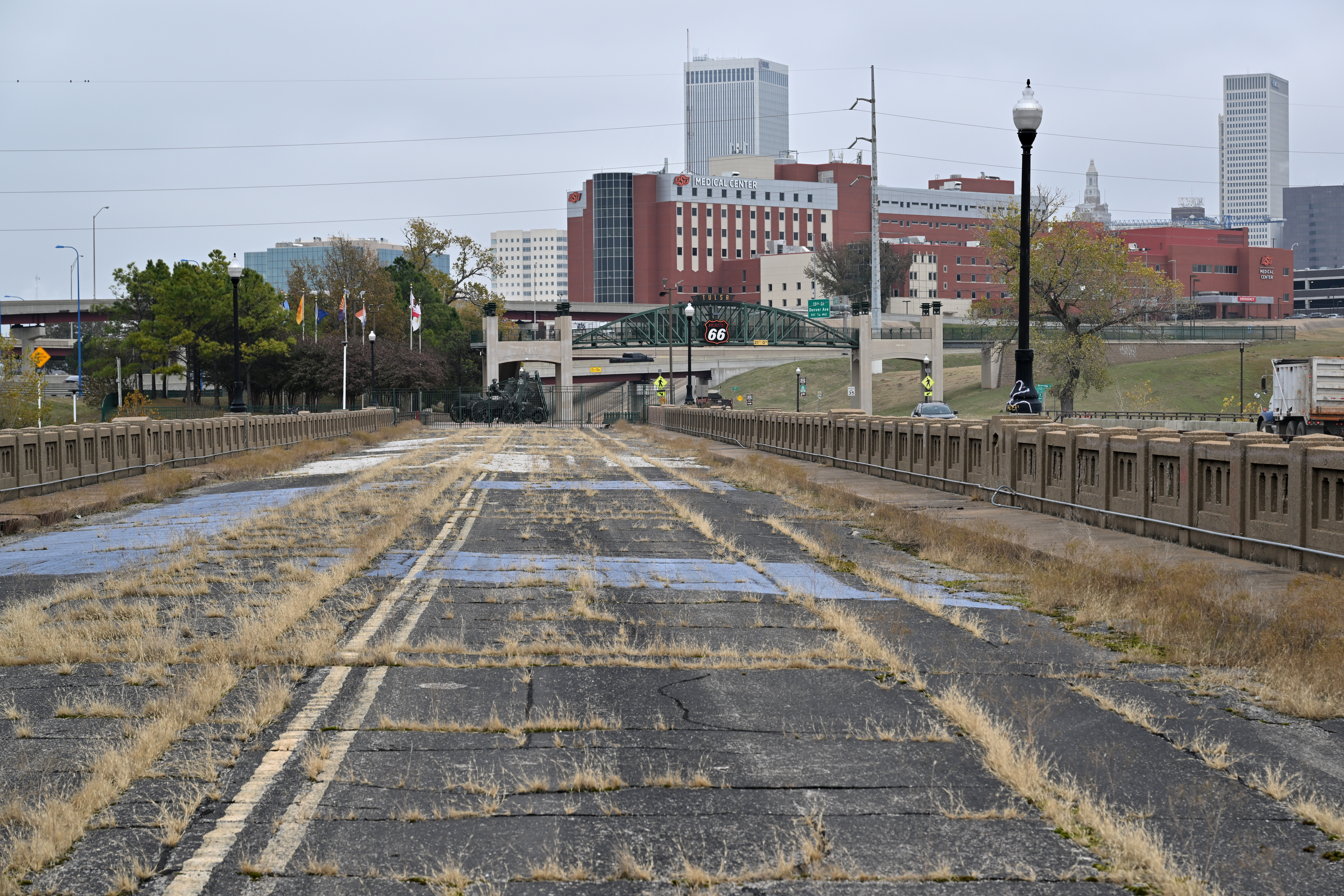
Grass on the 11th St bridge, Tulsa, OK

Time has not been good to the old bridge, and it has been rated as "quite dangerous" and unsafe for pedestrians by the City of Tulsa. There are holes in the deck, the pavement has buckled in many places, and weeds grow in the cracks. The gates were locked in 2008. Although it was considered as the centerpiece of a Route 66 exhibit, engineers estimated that it would cost $15 million just to be made safe for pedestrians. The conclusion was that the historic structure is "... too expensive to repair, too historic to demolish, and too valuable to ignore".

The adjacent I-244 bridges already reached the end of their service lives. The westbound bridge was closed and demolition begun in May 2011. The demolished structure was replaced by a double-deck, multimodal span. The top deck carries vehicles and the lower deck will have a pedestrian way and two railroad tracks (to be added in the future). Extreme care has been used during the demolition to avoid vibrations that might further damage the old 11th Street Bridge. The westbound bridge opened in July 2013 and temporarily carried both east and westbound traffic. The eastbound span of I-244 was then replaced and opened to traffic in September 2014 with overall completion scheduled for the spring of 2015.

== Cyrus Avery Centennial Plaza ==
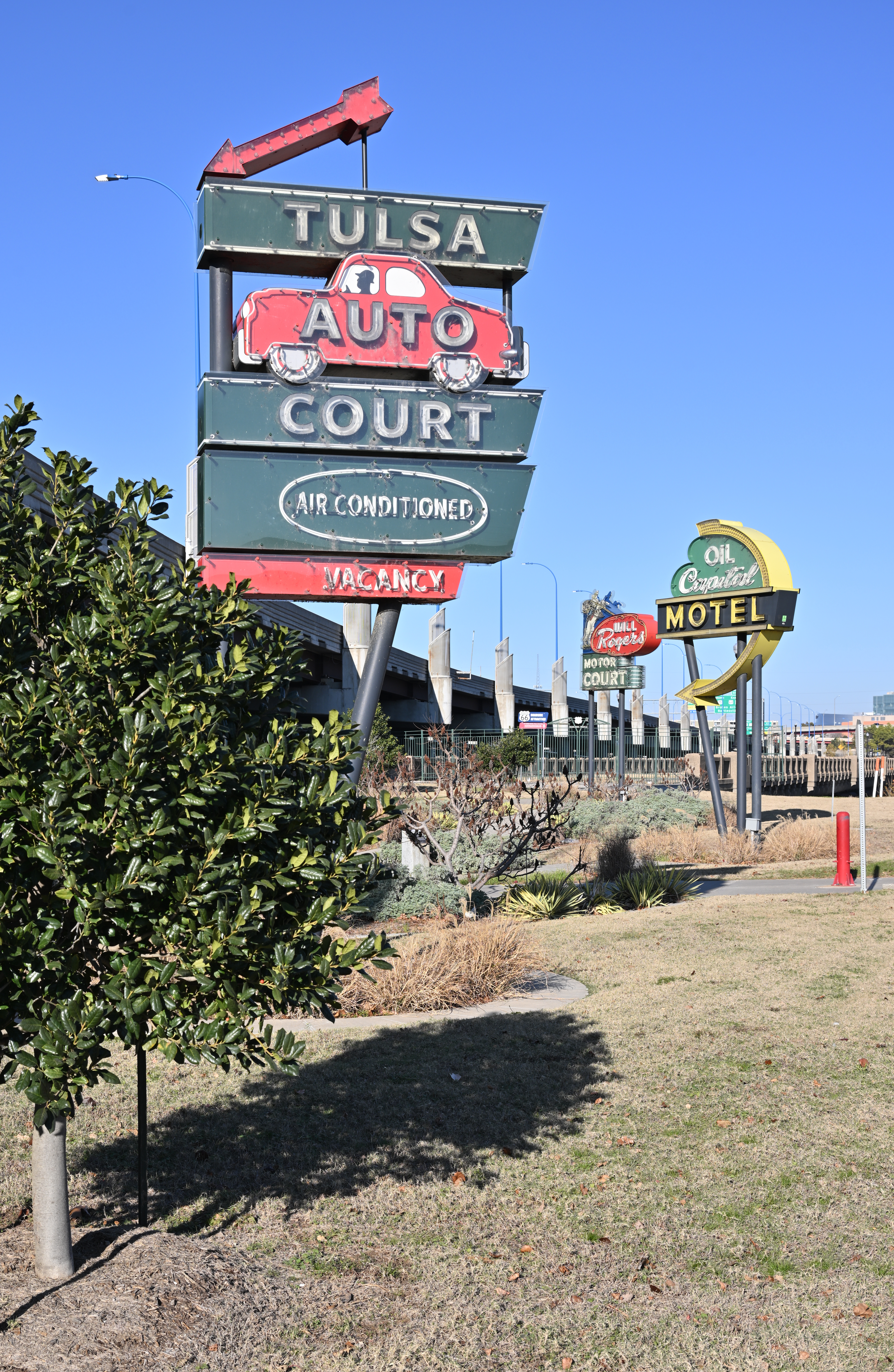
Tulsa Auto Court motel sign, Tulsa, OK

The ability to utilize the existing bridge, rather than having to build another one over the Arkansas, was said to be the major reason U.S. Route 66 was built through Tulsa. In commemoration of the Route and the man who helped bring it about, the Cyrus Avery Centennial Plaza is located adjacent to the east entrance of the historic Bridge in Tulsa, at the intersection of Southwest Boulevard and Riverside Drive. The first phase of the plaza included a display of flags of the eight states which were served by U.S Route 66. It was completed in July 2008 and dedicated on August 7, 2008. A skyway with an observation deck leads pedestrians from the visitors' parking lot across Southwest Boulevard. (Note: The plaza project was funded through the Vision 2025 program.)

The plaza features a bronze sculpture, created by artist Robert Summers titled "East Meets West". The sculpture is 14 feet (4.3 m) long, 18 feet (5.5 m) wide and 14 feet (4.3 m) high. The sculpture depicts the Avery family riding west in a Model T Ford auto meeting an eastbound horse-drawn carriage. It weighs over 20,000 pounds (9,100 kg) and cost about $1.178 million.

In 2020, the Route 66 Avery Plaza Southwest neon sign park opened at the west end of the Bridge. It includes replicas of three neon signs from Tulsa-area motels from the era, the Will Rogers Motor Court, Tulsa Auto Court, and the Oil Capital Motel.

== Proposed museum ==
A museum to educate visitors about the significance of Route 66 has been proposed. It would be built on a hill adjacent to the existing parking lot. No date has been established for this project.
