= Cyrus Avery =

Creator of US Route 66

Cyrus Stevens Avery
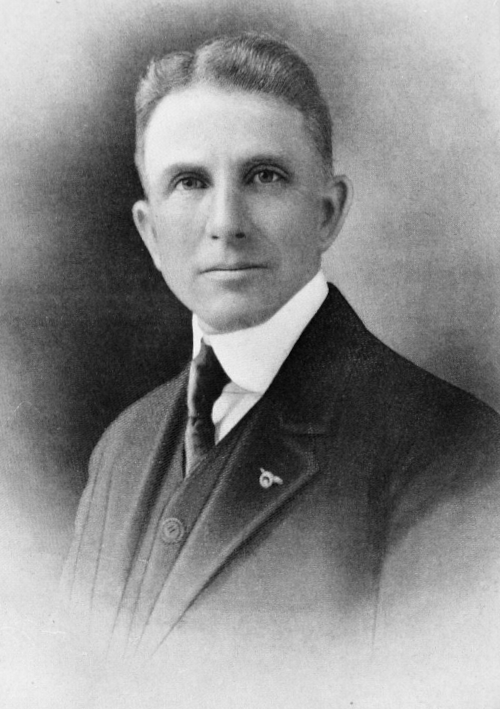
- Born: August 31, 1871; Stevensville, Pennsylvania, US
- Died: July 2, 1963 (aged 91); Los Angeles, California, US
- Resting place: Rose Hill Cemetery, Tulsa; 36.162°N 95.925°W
- Monuments: Avery Drive, Cyrus Avery Route 66 Memorial Bridge and Cyrus Avery Centennial Plaza in Tulsa
- Citizenship: American
- Education: William Jewell College in Liberty, Missouri
- Occupations: Businessperson, oilman, highway commissioner
- Known for: U.S. Route 66 and the U.S. Highway 66 Association
- Spouse: Essie McClelland
- Children: 3

Cyrus Stevens Avery (1871–1963) was an American businessperson, oilman, and highway commissioner. He created the U.S. Route 66 while being a member of the federal board appointed to create the Federal Highway System, then pushed for the establishment of the U.S. Highway 66 Association to pave and promote the highway. As such, he is known as the "Father of Route 66".

== Early life and move to Oklahoma ==
He was born in Stevensville, Pennsylvania, on August 31, 1871. He and his parents, Alexander James Avery and Ruie Stevens Avery moved to Missouri in 1881. In 1890, the family moved to Noel, Missouri, where Cyrus received a certificate to teach in public schools. In 1893, he enrolled in William Jewell College in Liberty, Missouri, where he earned a Bachelor of Arts degree in 1897. He married Essie McClelland after graduation, then moved to Oklahoma City to be an insurance agent. In 1904, he moved to Vinita in Indian Territory, where he expanded into real estate loans and invested in the oil industry, establishing the Avery Oil & Gas Company. In 1907, he moved again to Tulsa. He bought a farm near Tulsa in 1908, where he raised Holstein and Ayrshire cattle, Duroc hogs, Shropshire sheep, and Percheron horses. In the following year, he established a 1,400 acres (570 ha) farm northeast of Tulsa for diversified agriculture. Cyrus had three children with Essie: sons Gordon Avery and Leighton Avery, and daughter Helen Avery Berghell.

== Avery and the creation of a national highway system ==
Shortly after WWI, Avery opened a proto-motel outside Tulsa. Avery soon realized that an interstate system of highways would help his adopted city and state prosper.

=== Good Roads Movement ===
Impressed with Missouri's Good Roads Movement, Avery joined the Oklahoma Good Roads Association. He also served as president of the Albert Pike Highway Association from 1917 to 1927. He was elected chairman of the Tulsa County Commission, serving from 1913 to 1916, and is considered responsible for the construction of the Eleventh Street Bridge, (Note: This bridge is listed on the National Register of Historic Places. It is now closed to both vehicular and pedestrian traffic.) which replaced an older wooden bridge across the Arkansas River. He also began pushing for a statewide improvement of roads. He eventually became involved in the creation of the Ozarks Trails, a system of roads connecting St. Louis and Amarillo, Texas. After working with creating more roads, he was elected president of the Associated Highway Associations of America. In 1923, he was appointed to the Oklahoma State Highway Commission, where he implemented a gasoline tax to fund the highway department.

He became instrumental in pushing for a federal level of good roads. In 1925, the United States Secretary of Agriculture appointed him to the Joint Board of Interstate Highways, which was to designate the new federal highways and mark them.

One of the routes requested by Congress was a road running from Virginia Beach, Virginia to Los Angeles, California. This road would follow what is now U.S. Highway 60 from Virginia Beach to Springfield, Missouri, continue west to Joplin, across southern Kansas, Colorado, Utah, turning south to Las Vegas, Nevada, then further south and west to Los Angeles. Avery successfully argued that to avoid the high peaks of the Rocky Mountains, the road should turn south through Tulsa and Oklahoma City, continue west across the Texas Panhandle, New Mexico, Arizona, and southern California. His suggestion that this highway should go east from Springfield to St. Louis and Chicago, Illinois, as commerce naturally continued in that direction, was also adopted.

After the highways were routed, the group decided not to name the highways (as had been done by many non-profit groups which were currently connecting various state routes into longer multi-state and transcontinental routes), but instead to follow the pattern of numbering the highways, as established in Wisconsin and Missouri. The current east-west routes would be even numbers, and the north-south would be odd. Major routes would be one- or two-digit numbers ending in either "1" or "0" depending on the route. To avoid a "U.S. 0", U.S. Highway 2 was treated as a "0" highway and U.S. Route 101 would be treated as a two-digit highway to expand the number of available routes north-south. Avery, arguing that the Chicago to Los Angeles route would be a major highway, numbered the highway US 60, began production of roadside signs. However, political trouble was brewing.

=== U.S. 60 vs. U.S. 62 ===
The Virginia Beach–Springfield route had been designated as U.S. 62 and actually terminated south of Galloway, Missouri at U.S. Highway 65. Kentucky would be the only state without a "0" highway. They countered Avery's US route by pushing for US 60 to run between Virginia Beach and Los Angeles; the Springfield to Chicago section could be "U.S. 60 North". Avery returned with "U.S. 60 South" for the Springfield–Virginia Beach alignment. Kentucky threatened to walk completely out of the new highway system (individual states could not be forced to participate in it). Finally, Kentucky offered a compromise: connect their highway with Avery's in Springfield and give their highway the number 60. Avery could have his Chicago–Los Angeles highway if he would accept the number 62 which was originally assigned to their road. Avery disliked the number 62, found out 66 was not used, and designated the Chicago–Los Angeles highway as U.S. 66. In 1926, the Federal Highway System was approved by Congress. With this done, Congress also de-certified all the old "association" highways.

=== Avery and the U.S. 66 Association ===
In 1927, Avery pushed for the creation of the U.S. Highway 66 Association to promote paving U.S. 66 and promote travel on the highway. He was elected vice president in 1929, and recruited Lon Scott for to promote the new highway. He got John T. Woodruff, a business connection in Springfield, Missouri, appointed as president. In the 1930s, Avery would attempt to have himself elected president of the organization, but he never succeeded.

== Death ==
Essie Avery died in October 1962. Cyrus Avery died in Los Angeles, California on July 2, 1963, and was buried in Rose Hill Cemetery in Tulsa. Avery Drive, a street in southwest Tulsa, was named for him.

== Honors ==
In 1997, the National Historic Route 66 Federation established a Cyrus Avery Award, which has been presented variously to individuals for outstanding creativity in depicting Route 66, and to organizations for noteworthy preservation projects.

In 2004, the City of Tulsa, Oklahoma renamed the Eleventh Street Bridge (which carried US 66 over the Arkansas River), the Cyrus Avery Route 66 Memorial Bridge in his honor.

In late 2012, artist Robert Summers unveiled East Meets West, a sculpture in Cyrus Avery Centennial Plaza at Southwest Boulevard at Riverside Drive in Tulsa. The detailed 135%-scale bronze depicts Avery stopping his Ford on the 11th Street Bridge as the vehicle frightened two horses pulling a wagon laden with oil barrels.
