= U.S. Highway 66 Association =

Former transportation promotional organization

- U.S. Highway 66 in red
- Successor: Route 66 Association
- Formation: February 4, 1927; 99 years ago
- Founded at: Tulsa, Oklahoma, U.S.
- Dissolved: November 1979; 47 years ago
- Purpose: Promotion of U.S. Highway 66
- Key people: John T. Woodruff, first president Jack Cutberth, executive secretary (1954–1978)
- Formerly called: Main Street of America Association (1970–1979)

The U.S. Highway 66 Association was organized in 1927 to advocate for improvements to U.S. Highway 66 and to promote tourism on the highway. The organization changed its name to the Main Street of America Association in 1970 and disbanded in 1979.

== History ==
The association was formed on February 4, 1927, in Tulsa, Oklahoma, (Note: An Associated Press article in 1976 said the association was formed in 1920; however, that is inconsistent with contemporary newspaper reports and would predate when 66 was chosen as the number for the highway.) with John T. Woodruff of Springfield, Missouri, elected the first president. Woodruff was elected with the support of Cyrus Avery, the "Father of Route 66". The organization was similar to many that existed before the creation of federal highways in 1926, including those that promoted the Lincoln Highway and the National Old Trails Highway.

The association began to advertise the highway in magazines, on billboards, and brochures. The continued push to completely pave the highway and complete an unfinished section (Watson Road in St. Louis) paid off, as the road was fully paved and completed in 1938, including a cut-off across New Mexico that bypassed a loop through Santa Fe.

The U.S. Highway 66 Association curtailed activities when World War II rationing of rubber and fuel disrupted leisure travel. In 1947, the organization was revived. With efforts led by Jack and Gladys Cutberth, Highway 66 was promoted as "the shortest, fastest year-round best across the scenic West" with "800 miles of 4-lane highway". (Note: 800 miles or 1,300 kilometres) Jack Cutberth became executive secretary in May 1954, a role he held until his death in May 1978—he was reportedly the association's only salaried employee. The Cutberths, who lived in Clinton, Oklahoma, traveled the entire length of Highway 66 at least once each year to distribute promotional materials.

In 1955, construction began on the new Interstate Highway System. As these new interstates began to replace longer and longer sections of the old highway, the group changed its name to the Main Street of America Association in 1970 and continued to stand as a voice for the older highway.

The association published its last brochure in 1974; the brochure's cover referenced the new interstate highways that would lead to its demise. The association disbanded in November 1979, as U.S. Route 66 was by then largely concurrent with I-55, I-44, I-40, I-15, and I-10. In 1984, the last section through Williams, Arizona, was bypassed and Route 66 was formally decommissioned in 1985.

The former association is not officially connected with the various Route 66 Associations organized in all eight US Route 66 states that work to preserve and promote the historic highway. The first of these was established in 1987 by Angel Delgadillo and 15 businesspeople in Seligman, Arizona, to obtain "Historic Route 66" signage on the old highway.
