= William T. Grant Foundation =

Social science research organization (1936-)

The William T. Grant Foundation is an American non-profit foundation that funds research in the social sciences, with a particular focus on reducing inequality in youth outcomes and improving the use of research evidence in public policy and practice settings. It also funds career development and mentoring plans for post-doctoral researchers in a wide variety of disciplines through its William T. Grant Scholars Program. The Foundation's Institutional Challenge Grant encourages universities to support long-term research-practice partnerships with youth-serving nonprofit organizations, and its Youth Service Improvement Grants provide funding for nonprofit organizations to strengthen the quality existing programs for young people in New York City.

== History ==
The William T. Grant Foundation was established in 1936, originally as the Grant Foundation, by American businessman and philanthropist William Thomas Grant. In 1938, the Foundation funded its first major research project, the Grant Study at Harvard University, in which some of the subjects were followed for over 75 years. In 1977, it was renamed the William T. Grant Foundation, two years after Grant's W. T. Grant store franchise went bankrupt.

== See also ==
- Evidence-based policy
- Evidence-based practice
