= W. T. Grant =

Defunct American retailer

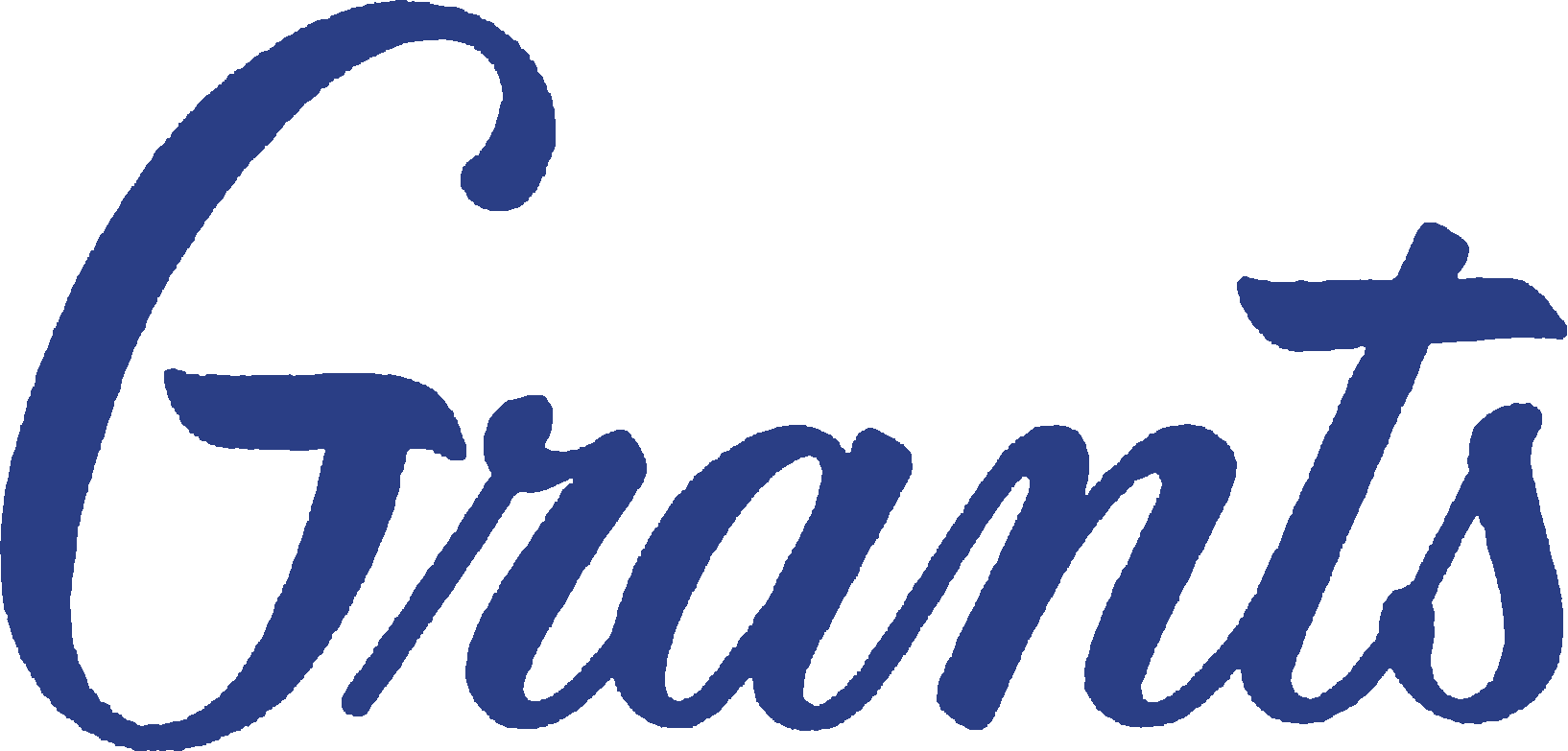

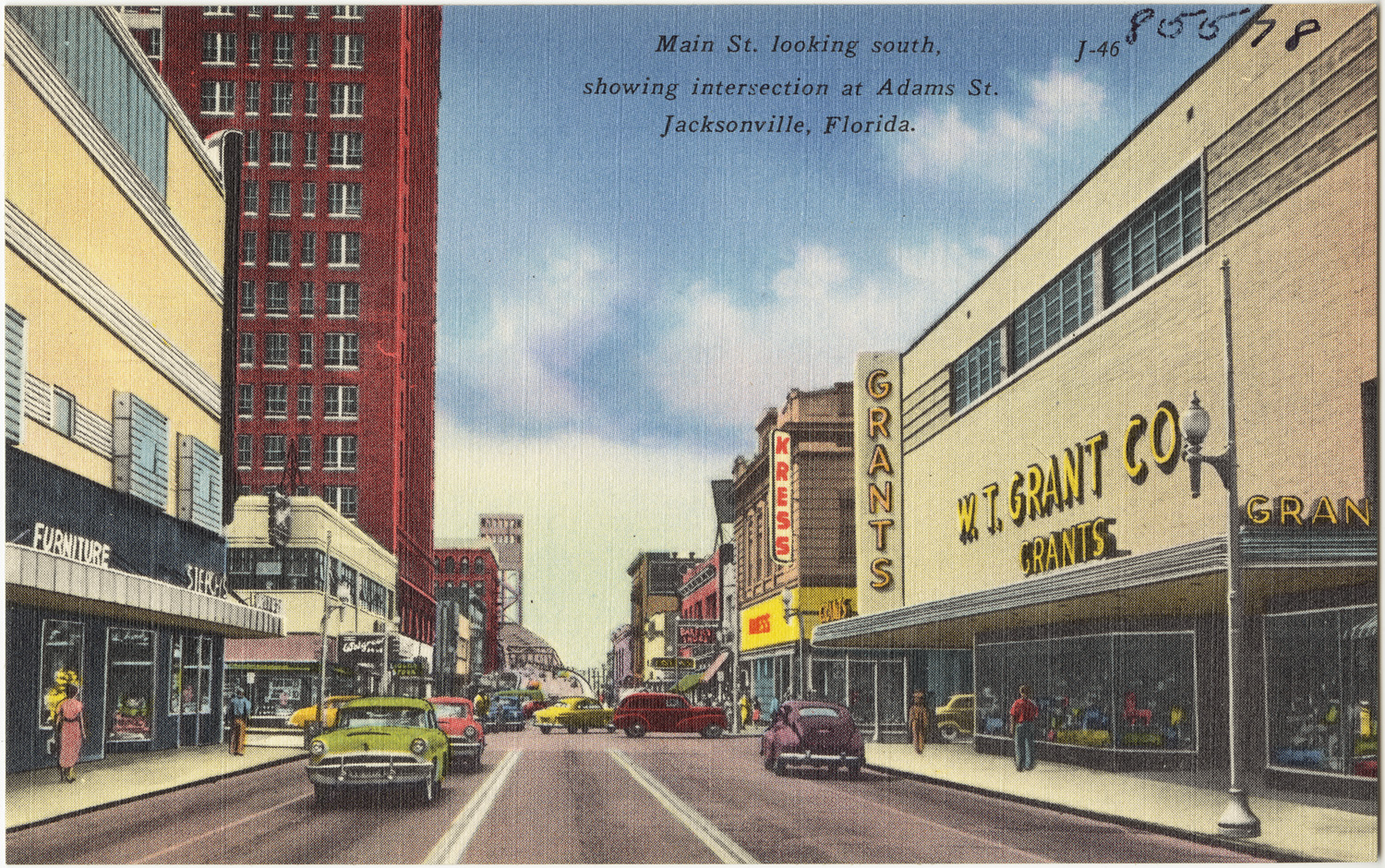
- W.T. Grant store (right) in Jacksonville, Florida.
- Industry: Retail
- Founded: 1906
- Founder: William Thomas Grant
- Defunct: 1976
- Fate: Filed for bankruptcy
- Area served: United States
- Products: General merchandise

W. T. Grant or Grants was a United States–based chain of mass-merchandise stores founded by William Thomas Grant that operated from 1906 until 1976. The stores were generally of the variety store format located in downtowns.

== History ==
In 1906 the first "W. T. Grant Co. 25 Cent Store" (equal to $8.96 today) opened in Lynn, Massachusetts. Modest profit, coupled with a fast turnover of inventory, caused the stores to grow to almost $100 million (~$1.77 billion in 2024) annual sales by 1936, the same year that William Thomas Grant started the Grant Foundation, later renamed as the William T. Grant Foundation. By the time Grant died in 1972 at age 96, his chain of W. T. Grant Stores had grown to almost 1,200. At the company's end, headquarters were atop One Astor Plaza, a prominent building of New York City's skyline in Times Square.

Like many national chain stores and some larger department stores, Grant arranged for a low price record label exclusive to W. T. Grant Stores, Diva Records. Columbia Records produced the label from 1925 through 1930. It consisted of titles also issued on Columbia's general sale Harmony label. Based on the number of copies still in existence, it appears to have been a good selling label. Grant continued to sell records after 1930, but they no longer had their own label.

Classic logo

Grant's store-branded electronics and other goods were named Bradford after Bradford County, Pennsylvania, where William Thomas Grant was born. The in-store restaurants were named Bradford House, and their mascot was a pilgrim named Bucky Bradford. An alternative restaurant format, The Skillet, was used for in-store lunch counters.

The largest W. T. Grant store was located in Vails Gate, New York. It became a Caldor and several other stores, and later a Kmart, which closed in November 2017.

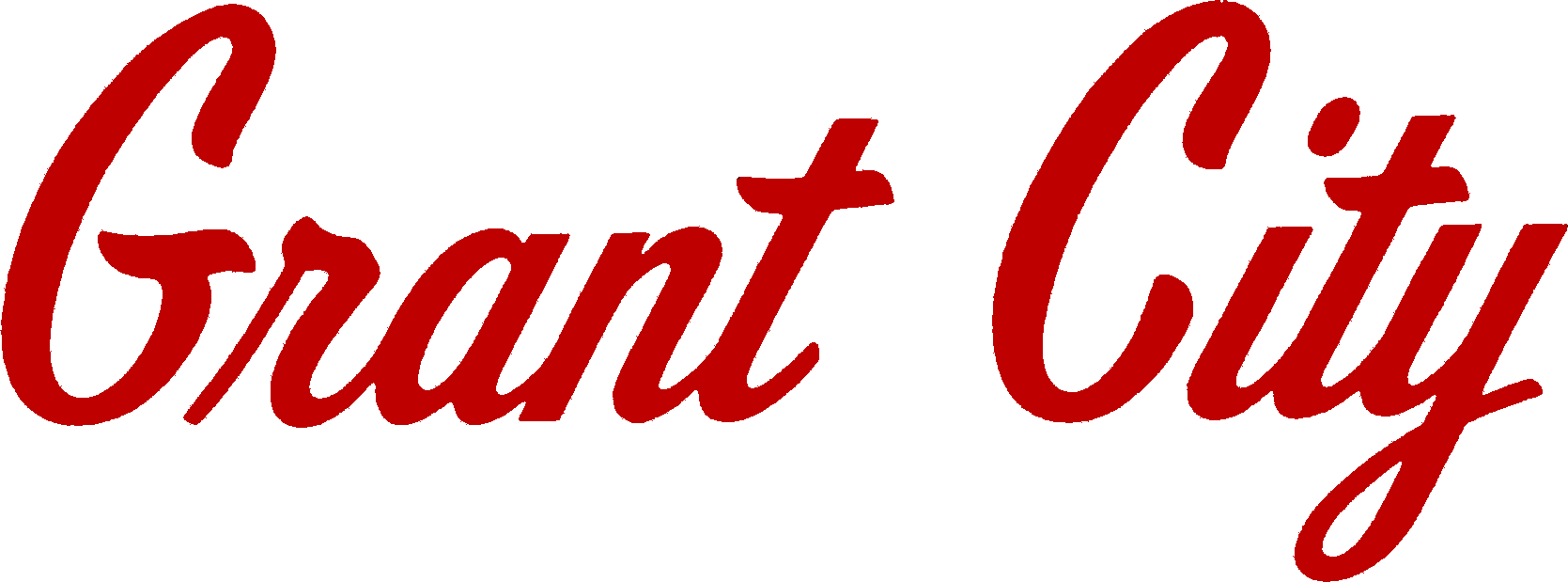
Grant City was Grant's discount store format.

They also tried to convert existing stores to discount stores under the "Diskay" brand.

Canadian retailer Zellers concluded a deal with the W. T. Grant Company. The Grant Company was allowed to purchase 10% of Zellers common shares, and was given options that eventually translated into a 51% effective ownership of Zellers in 1959. In return for this, the "Grant Company [was] making available to Zellers its experience on matters of merchandise, real estate, store development, and general administration". Zellers employees were sent to Grant stores and head office for training and together they made common buying trips to Asia, a practice that benefited both companies. By 1976, the Grant Company withdrew from Zellers.

=== Downfall and closure ===
Grant's stores were slower than the Kresge stores to adapt to the growth of the suburb and the change in shopping habits that this entailed. The attempt to correct this was belated; in the 1960s and early 1970s, the company built many larger stores (later known as Grant City), but unlike Kresge's Kmart they lacked uniform size and layout, so that a shopper familiar with one did not immediately feel "at home" in another. Grants' delay in building out its network of larger stores afforded rivals an opportunity to secure the most desirable building sites, leaving Grants with less preferable locations, often with inadequate selling space. After the company began to lose money, funds were borrowed to pay the quarterly dividend until this became impossible. A final tactic to stay in business involved requiring Grant's clerks and cashiers to offer a Grant's credit card application to customers to boost sales in the stores.

W. T. Grant's bankruptcy in 1976 which was the then-second biggest in US history, was in part due to a failure to adapt to changing times but was probably accelerated by management's refusal until it was too late to eliminate the shareholder dividend. While there is some argument over exactly which combination of decisions caused this, all these decisions were made by an unchecked management layer and the bankruptcy is considered the "beginning of the end" of the idea that US company directors had complete control over their company and no obligation to the company's shareholders to make 'the best' decisions to maintain the company value and survival.

The most apparent cause of the bankruptcy was the company's decision to extend store credit to all customers, with no attempt made to assess the customer's ability to repay. Each of the company's stores had credit managers who authorized the opening of store credit accounts, which resulted in many customers having credit accounts with more than one of the company's stores. In addition, there existed no centralized control or record-keeping of store credit accounts which resulted in noncollectable accounts. The credit was recovered in 1976 by Irwin Jacobs who, with the backing of Carl Pohlad, purchased their consumer accounts receivable account of $276.3 million for $44 million and 5% of first-year sales.

This initiative to extend credit to all customers was made in 1969, during a prosperous period in US history, when Grant was expanding into new areas of the US. W. T. Grant hoped to attract customers from rival Kresge and other department stores. The low number of defaults on small loans at this time meant that the credit arrangements seemed a good idea, but the absence of any credit check, and the low minimum repayment terms were extreme, even for the times. When the economic expansion slowed in 1970/1971 the balance shifted and the credit arrangement became more of a liability than an asset. No decision was made to change or halt this before 1974, by which time the company's collapse was a certainty.
