= Grant Study =

Continuing longitudinal study

The Grant Study
- Type of project: Longitudinal study
- Location: Cambridge, Massachusetts, U.S.
- Founder: William Thomas Grant
- Key people: Robert Waldinger
- Established: 1938
- Funding: William T. Grant Foundation
- Website: www.adultdevelopmentstudy.org/grantandglueckstudy

The Grant Study is an 87-year continuing longitudinal study from the Study of Adult Development at Harvard Medical School, started in 1938. It has followed 268 Harvard-educated men, the majority of whom were members of the undergraduate classes of 1942, 1943 and 1944.

It has run in tandem with the Glueck Study, which included a second cohort of 456 disadvantaged, non-delinquent inner-city youths who grew up in Boston neighborhoods between 1940 and 1945. The Glueck Study was conducted in order to pinpoint predictors of delinquency. The participants were all white males and of American nationality. As of 2024, the men continue to be studied. They were evaluated at least every two years by questionnaires through information from their physicians and by personal interviews. Information was gathered about their mental and physical health, career enjoyment, retirement experience and marital quality. The study later included questionnaires to the descendants of these men. The goal of the study was to identify predictors of healthy aging.

The study, its methodology, and results are described in three books by a principal investigator in the study, George Vaillant. The first book, Adaptation to Life, describes the study up to a time when the men were 47 years of age. The second book, Aging Well, describes a time when the inner-city men were 70 years old and those of the Harvard group were 80. In 2012, Vaillant and Harvard University Press published the third book, Triumphs of Experience, which shared more findings from the Grant Study.

The study is part of The Study of Adult Development, which is now under the direction of Robert J. Waldinger at Massachusetts General Hospital.

The study is unique; partly because of the long-time span of the cohort, and also partly because of the high social status of some of the study participants. Among the most notable Grant Study participants included Ben Bradlee, an editor of The Washington Post, and US President John F. Kennedy.

== Main results ==
George Vaillant, who directed the study for more than three decades, has published a summation of the key insights the study has yielded in the book Triumphs of Experience: The Men of the Harvard Grant Study:

- Alcoholism is a disorder of great destructive power.
  - Alcoholism was the main cause of divorce between the Grant Study men and their wives.
  - It strongly correlates with neurosis and depression that followed the alcohol abuse.
  - Together with associated cigarette smoking, alcoholism was the single greatest contributor to early morbidity and death.
- Financial success depends on warmth of relationships, not on intelligence.
  - Those who scored highest on measurements of "warm relationships" earned an average of $141,000 a year more at their peak salaries (usually between ages 55 and 60).
  - No significant difference in maximum income earned by men with IQs in the 110–115 range compared to men with IQs higher than 150.
- Political mindedness correlates with intimacy: aging liberals have more sex.
  - The most-conservative men ceased sexual relations at an average age of 68.
  - The most-liberal men had active sex lives into their 80s.
- Men with relationship satisfaction were healthier in old age: Those that thrived in their relationships at 50 were more physically healthy at 80 years old.
- The warmth of childhood relationship with mothers matters long into adulthood:
  - Men who had "warm" childhood relationships with their mothers earned an average of $87,000 more a year than men whose mothers were uncaring.
  - Men who had poor childhood relationships with their mothers were much more likely to develop dementia when old.
  - Late in their professional lives, the men's boyhood relationships with their mothers—but not with their fathers—were associated with effectiveness at work.
  - The warmth of childhood relationships with mothers had no significant bearing on "life satisfaction" at 75.
- The warmth of childhood relationship with fathers correlated with:
  - Lower rates of adult anxiety.
  - Greater enjoyment of vacations.
  - Increased "life satisfaction" at age 75.
