= William Thomas Grant =

American businessman

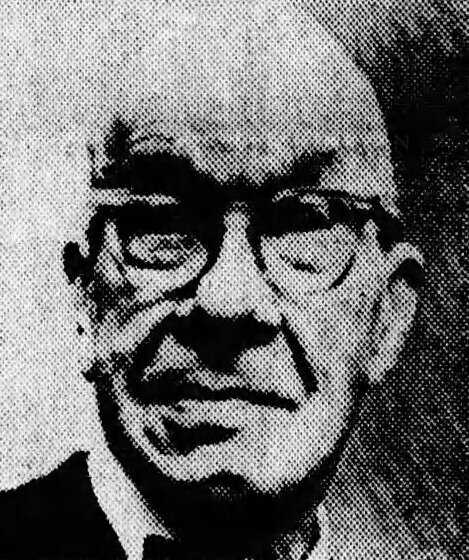
Grant in 1966

William Thomas Grant (1876–1972) was the founder of a chain of U.S. mass-merchandise stores bearing his name, W. T. Grant, and an important American philanthropist.

== Biography ==
Grant was born in Stevensville, Bradford County, Pennsylvania; his family moved to Massachusetts when he was approximately 5 years of age.

At age 7 Grant began his sales career by selling flower seeds. Years later, he wanted to sell people what they needed at prices they could afford, with only a modest profit. In 1906, at 30 years of age he opened his first "W. T. Grant Co. 25 Cent Store" in Lynn, Massachusetts.

His initial capital was $1,000 he had saved from his work as a salesman. This modest profit, coupled with a fast turnover of inventory, caused Grant's business to grow to almost $100 million in annual sales by 1936, the same year that he started the William T. Grant Foundation. The stores were generally of the dime store format located in downtowns.

Among his avocations were philosophy, painting, and local philanthropy. In his later years, Grant was chairman of the board of the W. T. Grant Company and president of the Grant Foundation, and later chairman of the board. He received honorary Doctor of Laws degrees from Bates College in Maine and the University of Miami.

Grant was the founder of the Grant Study, which was a longitudinal study of Adult Development at Harvard Medical School beginning in 1938 that followed 268 Harvard educated men in order to identify predictors of healthy aging. The study found that alcoholism was the leading cause of divorces, correlated strongly with depression and neurosis, and when combined with the negative effects of smoking cigarettes, was determined to be the single greatest contributor to early morbidity and ultimately death. The study also found that warmth in relationships, rather than intelligence, were the best predictor of financial success. Other findings from the study include how political mindedness correlates with physical intimacy, how marital satisfaction correlates with good health and aging, as well as the correlation between parental relationships in childhood and health, success, and life satisfaction.

He retired from both the W. T. Grant Company and the Grant Foundation at age 90, yet still served in an honorary capacity until his death in 1972 in Greenwich, CT at age 96. By that time his nationwide empire of W. T. Grant Co. (Grants) and Grant City stores had grown to almost 1,200, although the company failed in 1975 and was soon liquidated.
