= Robert J. Waldinger =

American psychiatry professor (born 1951)

- Born: 1 March 1951 (age 75); Omaha, Nebraska, U.S.
- Occupations: Psychiatrist, psychoanalyst
- Known for: Harvard Study of Adult Development, Glueck Study, Grant Study, TED Talk, Zen teaching
- Spouse: Jennifer A. Stone
- Children: Daniel C.; David S.
- Parents: David Waldinger (father); Miriam Passman Waldinger (mother)

Academic background
- Education: Harvard University (BA, MD)

Academic work
- Discipline: Psychiatry, psychodynamic therapy
- Institutions: Massachusetts General Hospital; Harvard Medical School

Robert J. Waldinger (born 1951) is an American psychiatrist, psychoanalyst, and Zen priest. He is a part-time professor of psychiatry at Harvard Medical School and directs the Harvard Study of Adult Development, one of the longest-running studies of adult life ever conducted.

== Early life and education ==
Waldinger grew up in Des Moines, Iowa. He graduated summa cum laude from Harvard College in 1973. He completed his M.D. at Harvard Medical School in 1978.

== Career ==
Waldinger directs the Harvard Study of Adult Development. The study is the overall study and consists of two different groups of people: the Harvard undergraduate group, originally called the Grant Study because it was funded by philanthropist W. T. Grant, and the inner-city group, called the Glueck Study because it was started by law professor Sheldon Glueck. Both groups are now under the umbrella of the Harvard Study of Adult Development. The study tracked the lives of 724 men for nearly 80 years and now studies their baby boomer children to understand how childhood experience reaches across decades to affect health and wellbeing in middle age. He has also criticized the study for starting just with white male probands.

Waldinger writes about scientific approaches to healthy human development and is the founding director of the Lifespan Research Foundation, which presents the insights of lifespan research to the general public.

Waldinger is the author of numerous scientific papers as well as two books. He directs a teaching program in psychodynamic psychotherapy at Massachusetts General Hospital in Boston. He has won awards for teaching and research from the American Psychiatric Association, Harvard Medical School, and Massachusetts Psychiatric Society.

Waldinger is also a Zen priest and sensei (transmitted teacher) in both Sōtō and Rinzai lineages, and teaches Zen in New England and internationally. His TED talk on lessons from the longest study of happiness has had over 51 million views and is the fastest spreading talk in the history of TEDx events.

On January 10, 2023, with Marc Schulz, Waldinger released The Good Life: Lessons from the World's Longest Scientific Study of Happiness.

In 2025, Waldinger referenced that the study has found that the quality of people's close relationships is a stronger predictor of long-term health and happiness than wealth, fame, social class, IQ, or genes.
