= Galloway, Springfield, Missouri =

Neighborhood in Missouri, U.S.

Coordinates: 37°08′12″N 93°14′17″W

Galloway is a neighborhood of southeast Springfield, Missouri, United States. Galloway is located in a stream valley approximately one-half mile north of the U.S. Route 60 and U.S. Route 65 interchange and one mile south of Sequiota Park.

== History ==
A post office called Galloway was established in 1883, and remained in operation until 1943. The community has the name of a Union Army officer.

From 1945 and into the 1950s, the combined U.S. 60 - U.S. 65 highways passed through Galloway at the southeast entrance to Springfield.
