= U.S. Route 66 =

Former US Highway between Chicago and Santa Monica

U.S. Route 66
- Will Rogers Memorial Highway
- The final alignments of U.S. Route 66 in red, with older alignments in pink

Route information
- Length: 2,448 mi (3,940 km)
- Existed: November 11, 1926–June 26, 1985
- Tourist routes: Historic Route 66 National Scenic Byway (selected segments)

Major junctions
- West end: Santa Monica, California
- East end: Chicago, Illinois

Location
- Country: United States
- States: California, Arizona, New Mexico, Texas, Oklahoma, Kansas, Missouri, Illinois

Highway system
- United States Numbered Highway System; List; Special; Divided
← US 65	→ US 67

U.S. Route 66 or U.S. Highway 66 (US 66 or Route 66) was one of the original highways in the United States Numbered Highway System. Established on November 11, 1926, with signage erected the following year, the highway ran from Chicago, Illinois, through Missouri, Kansas, Oklahoma, Texas, New Mexico, and Arizona before terminating in Santa Monica, California, covering 2,448 miles (3,940 km).

US 66 became a major route for westward migration, especially during the Dust Bowl of the 1930s, and contributed to the economic development of communities along its path. It later faced decline as traffic was diverted to the Interstate Highway System in the mid-20th century.

The highway was officially removed from the United States Highway System in 1985 after being largely replaced by Interstate highways. Many segments of the former route have since been preserved as Historic Route 66, a National Scenic Byway, and incorporated into state and local road systems.

Route 66 has been widely represented in American popular culture and is often referred to by nicknames such as the Mother Road, a term popularized by John Steinbeck's novel The Grapes of Wrath (1939), as well as the Main Street of America and the Will Rogers Highway. It was also celebrated in song and on television. The road and impact of the Interstate Highway System bypassing small towns along the route was central to the story in Disney and Pixar's 2006 animated film Cars.

== History ==
Lengths (1926 alignment)
	mi	km
California	316	509
Arizona	401	645
New Mexico	487	784
Texas	186	299
Oklahoma	432	695
Kansas	13	21
Missouri	317	510
Illinois	301	484
Total	2,448	3,940

=== Before the U.S. Highway System ===
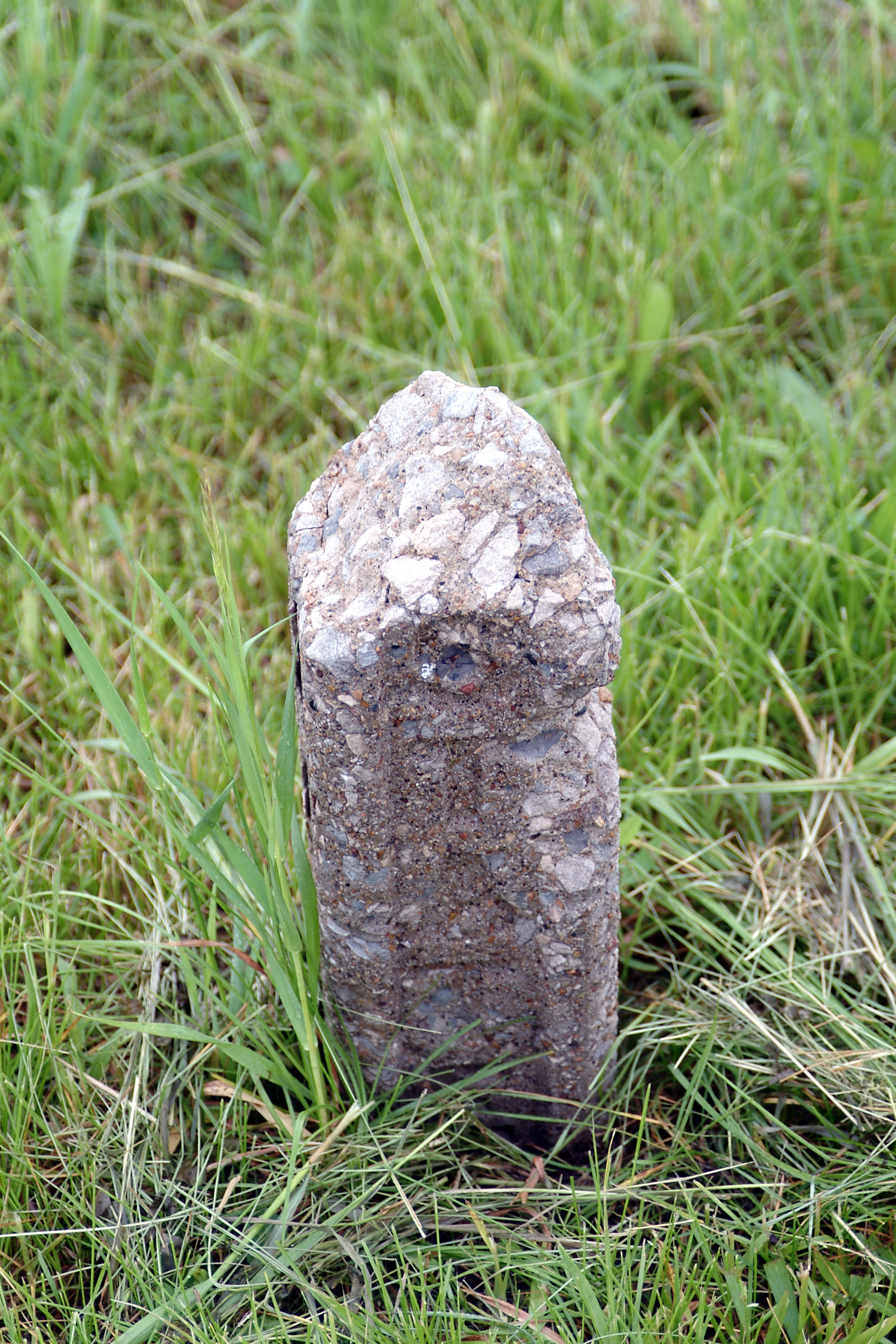
A remnant of an original state right-of-way marker from early construction of US 66

In 1857, Lt. Edward Fitzgerald Beale of the U.S. Army Corps of Topographical Engineers was directed by the United States Department of War to construct a wagon road along the 35th parallel. The route, later known as Beale's Wagon Road, was intended to improve transportation across the southwestern United States and included experiments with the use of camels as pack animals. Portions of this route were later incorporated into alignments of US 66.

Before the creation of a nationwide system of numbered highways, long-distance travel in the United States relied on a network of privately marked auto trails. The route that later became US 66 incorporated segments of several of these trails, including the National Old Trails Road, parts of the Ozark Trails system, and, in the Midwest and South, portions of routes such as the Lone Star Route. These routes were often indirect and inconsistently marked, leading to calls for a standardized national highway system.

Like other early U.S. Highways, Route 66 was assembled from existing local, state, and national road networks rather than built as an entirely new road. Its proposed Chicago–Los Angeles alignment gained support because it connected established regional centers along an existing transcontinental corridor.

Federal involvement in highway development expanded with the Federal Aid Road Act of 1916 and the Federal Aid Highway Act of 1921. In 1925, Congress authorized the creation of a national system of numbered highways, and the American Association of State Highway Officials (AASHO) began developing a uniform plan for route designations. Businessman Cyrus Avery and others advocated for a Chicago–Los Angeles route, which became US 66 when the system was implemented in 1926, calling it the "shortest, best and most scenic route".

=== Birthplace and rise of US 66 ===
The route sign from 1926 to 1948 in Arizona

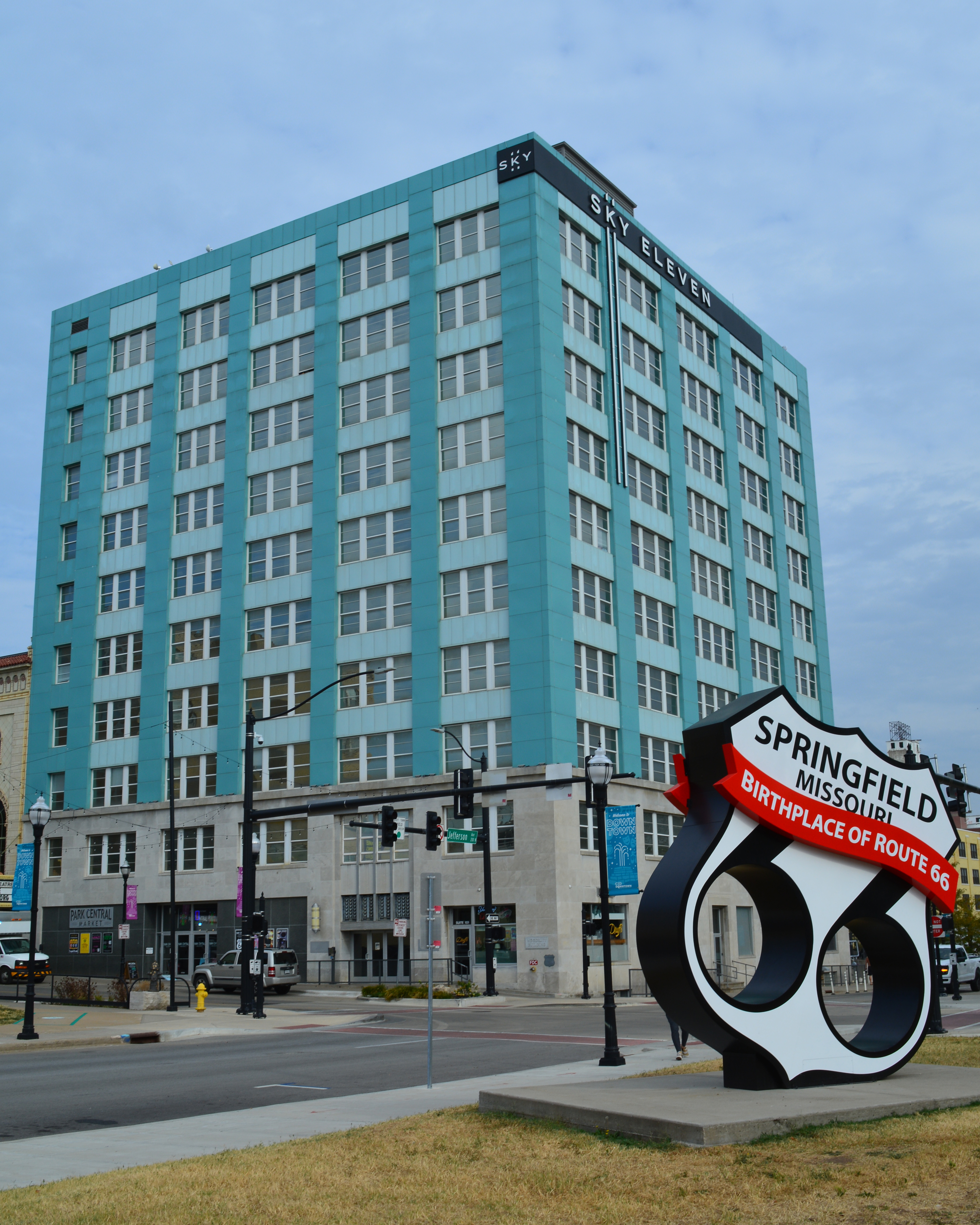
Route 66 marker outside the Woodruff Building in Springfield, Missouri

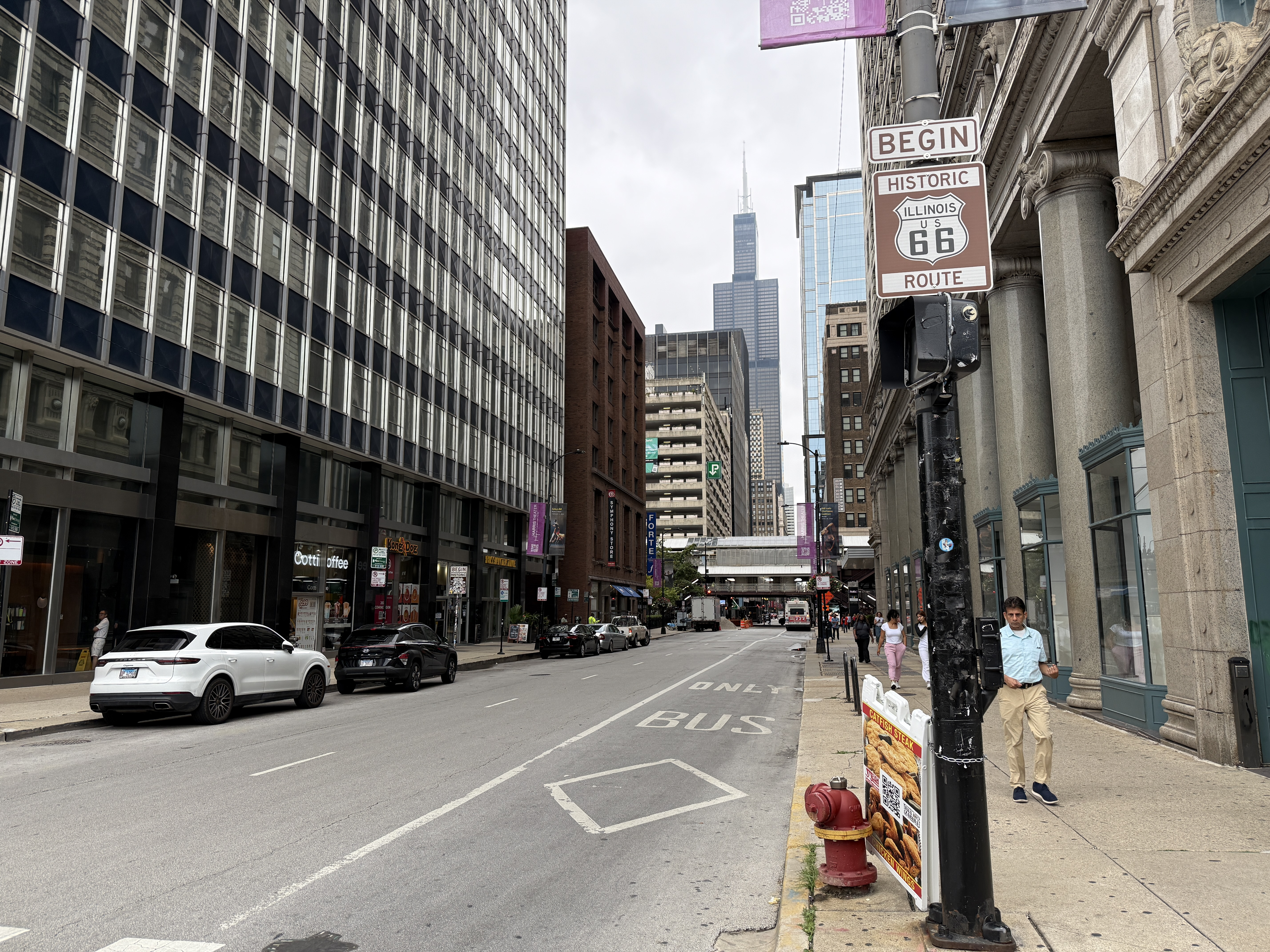
Modern 'historic' signage at Route 66's eastern terminus in Chicago

==== Designation and early development ====
The numerical designation for U.S. Route 66 was assigned in 1926 as part of the initial planning of the United States Numbered Highway System. The route connected Chicago and Los Angeles, linking a series of existing regional roads into a continuous transcontinental highway.

The designation of U.S. Route 66 followed a dispute over numbering within the newly planned highway system. Promoter Cyrus Avery initially sought the designation US 60 for the Chicago–Los Angeles route, but officials in Kentucky successfully argued that US 60 should instead follow an east–west corridor through their state. Alternative proposals included assigning the Chicago–Los Angeles route to US 62 or splitting US 60 into multiple branches. The issue was resolved when Oklahoma highway engineer John M. Page identified 66 as an unassigned number, which Avery accepted as the designation for the route.

Although the route was designated in 1926 and signed in 1927, it remained partly unpaved for several years. By 1938, US 66 became the first U.S. highway to be fully paved, improving long-distance travel across the central and southwestern United States.

==== Promotion and growth ====
The Chain of Rocks Bridge across the Mississippi River was built to carry the growing traffic of US 66 around the city of St. Louis

Following its designation, the U.S. Highway 66 Association was established in 1927 to promote paving, maintenance, and tourism along the route. Led by Cyrus Avery and others, the organization marketed US 66 as a major transcontinental highway and encouraged travel along it.

Promotional efforts included national advertising campaigns and events such as the 1928 "Bunion Derby", a multiday footrace that followed the route from Los Angeles to Chicago before continuing on to New York City, which attracted national attention. The association also promoted travel through print advertising, including a 1932 campaign in the Saturday Evening Post encouraging Americans to travel US 66 to the 1932 Summer Olympics in Los Angeles, which generated widespread public interest in the highway. The organization continued to advocate for businesses and communities along the route until it disbanded in November 1979.

==== Migration and economic impact ====
During the Dust Bowl of the 1930s, US 66 became a major route for westward migration, particularly for people traveling from the southern Great Plains to California in search of work. Many of these migrants—often referred to at the time as "Okies", especially those from Oklahoma—traveled along the highway, a movement later depicted in works such as John Steinbeck's The Grapes of Wrath (1939). Increased traffic along the route contributed to the growth of service industries in communities along the highway, including filling stations, restaurants, and motor courts.

==== Tourism and roadside culture ====
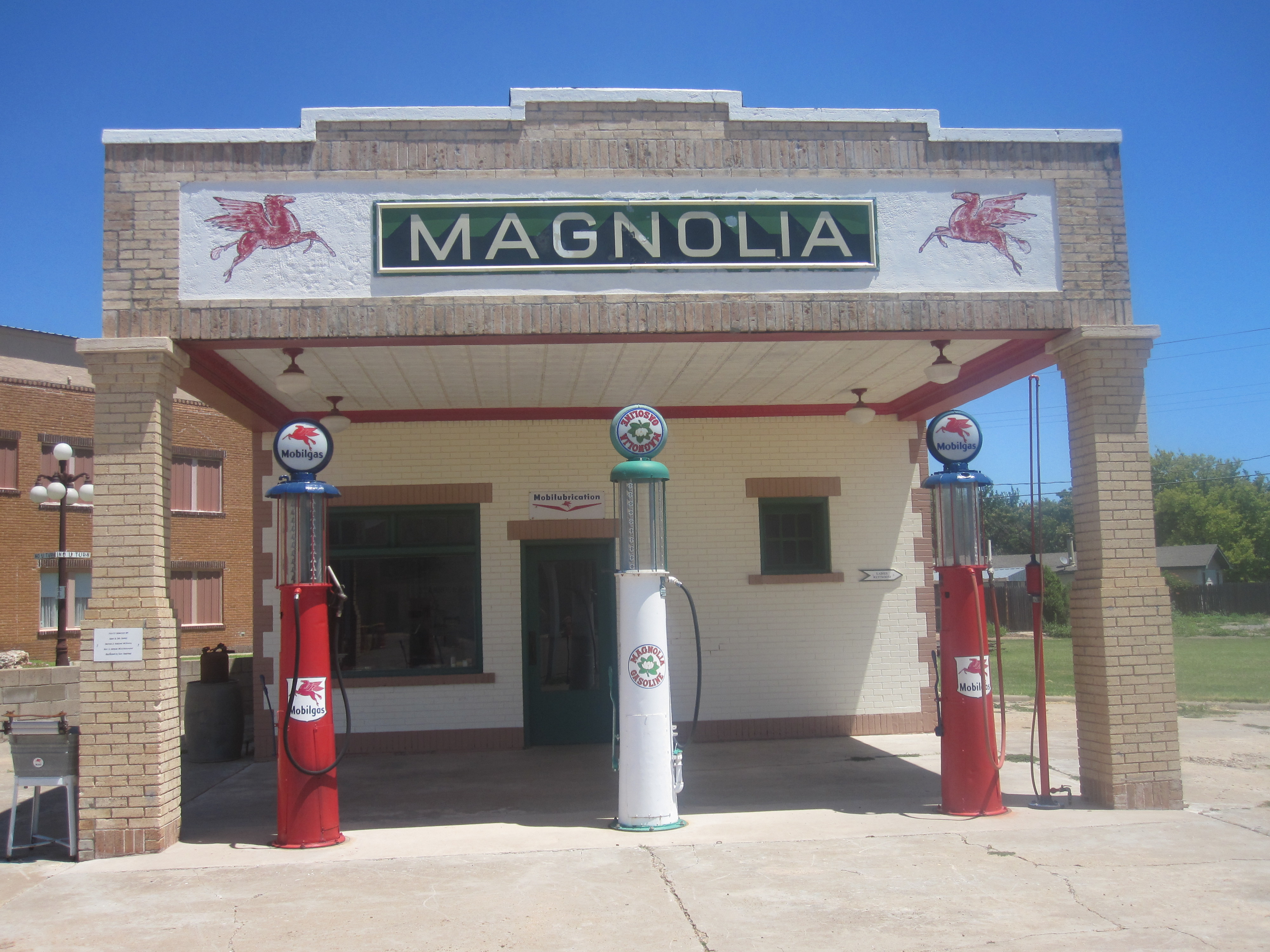
Restored Magnolia gasoline station museum on Route 66 in Shamrock, Texas

By the mid-20th century, U.S. Route 66 had become a major corridor for automobile tourism, particularly for travelers heading to destinations in the American Southwest such as the Grand Canyon and the Painted Desert. Increased traffic contributed to the growth of roadside businesses, including motels, restaurants, and service stations, many of which became characteristic of long-distance travel in the United States.

This growth also led to the development of distinctive roadside architecture and attractions, such as teepee-shaped motels and themed service stations. Notable surviving examples include the U-Drop Inn in Shamrock, Texas, an art deco–style service station and café listed on the National Register of Historic Places.

The expansion of automobile travel along the route also contributed to the early development of the fast-food industry, including drive-through restaurants and regional chains that catered to motorists.

=== Changes in routing ===
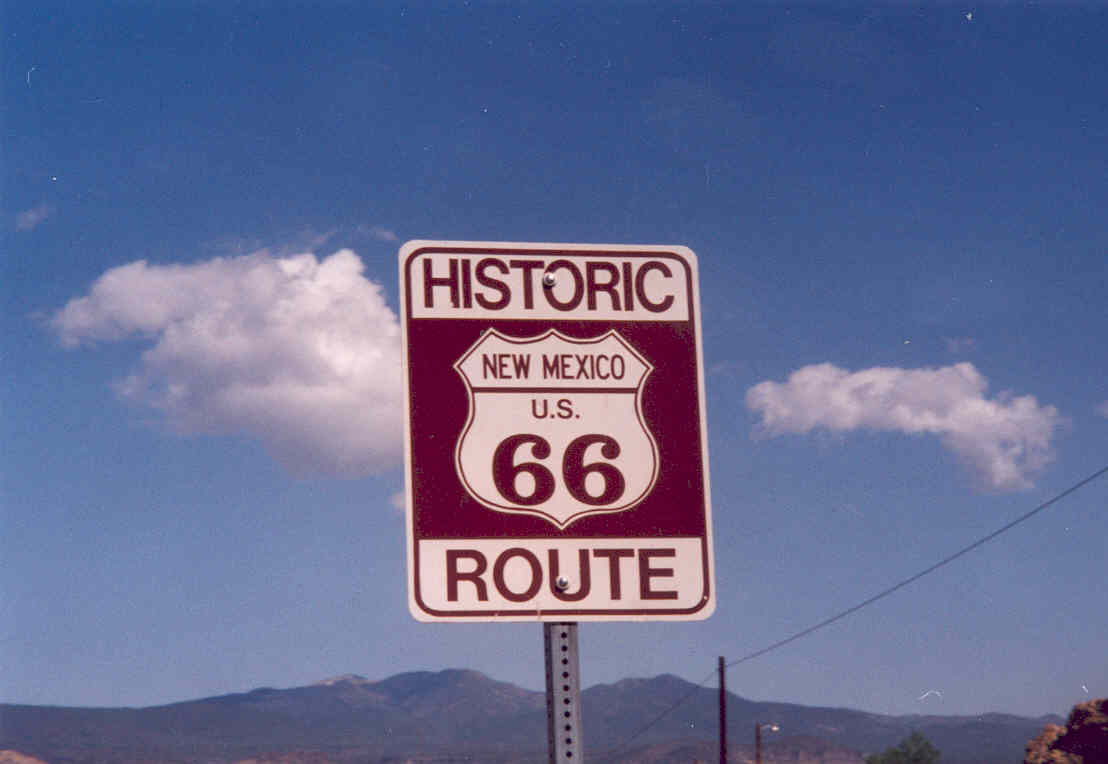
Modern-day sign in New Mexico, along a section of Route 66 designated a National Scenic Byway

When established in 1926, U.S. Route 66 ran from Chicago to Los Angeles with the eastern terminus at Jackson Boulevard and Michigan Avenue in Grant Park in Chicago. The western terminus was in downtown Los Angeles, in the Broadway Theater and Commercial District. The highway was not completely paved until 1938.

As the highway system developed, Route 66 was repeatedly realigned to safer, higher-capacity routes. In Illinois, the route was shifted in 1930 between Springfield and East St. Louis to a more direct alignment that generally corresponds to present-day Interstate 55.

Similar changes occurred elsewhere. In Oklahoma, a straighter alignment completed in 1933 bypassed earlier sections through smaller communities. In New Mexico, a 1937 realignment created a more direct route through Albuquerque, substantially shortening the journey.

In 1936, Route 66 was extended west from Los Angeles to Santa Monica at Lincoln and Olympic Boulevards, where Route 66 met U.S. 101A. The official western end of Route 66 sign can still be found in front of Mel's Drive-In at that intersection. Built in 1959 in the Googie style as the Penguin Coffee shop. The building was restored and reopened in 2018 by the family of Mel Weiss who founded the San Francisco Mel's Drive-In featured in American Graffiti.

The nearby Santa Monica Pier was labeled the route's "symbolic" western end, although it was not the official highway terminus.

In Chicago, the eastern terminus was extended east along Jackson Drive through Grant Park to Lake Shore Drive in 1937, following the relocation of U.S. Route 41 to Lake Shore Drive after completion of the Outer Drive Bridge.

In 1940, the Arroyo Seco Parkway between Los Angeles and Pasadena became an alignment of Route 66, making it one of the earliest freeway sections incorporated into the highway. The California Division of Highways had requested the rerouting of Route 66 onto the new parkway, with the former surface alignment retained as an alternate route.

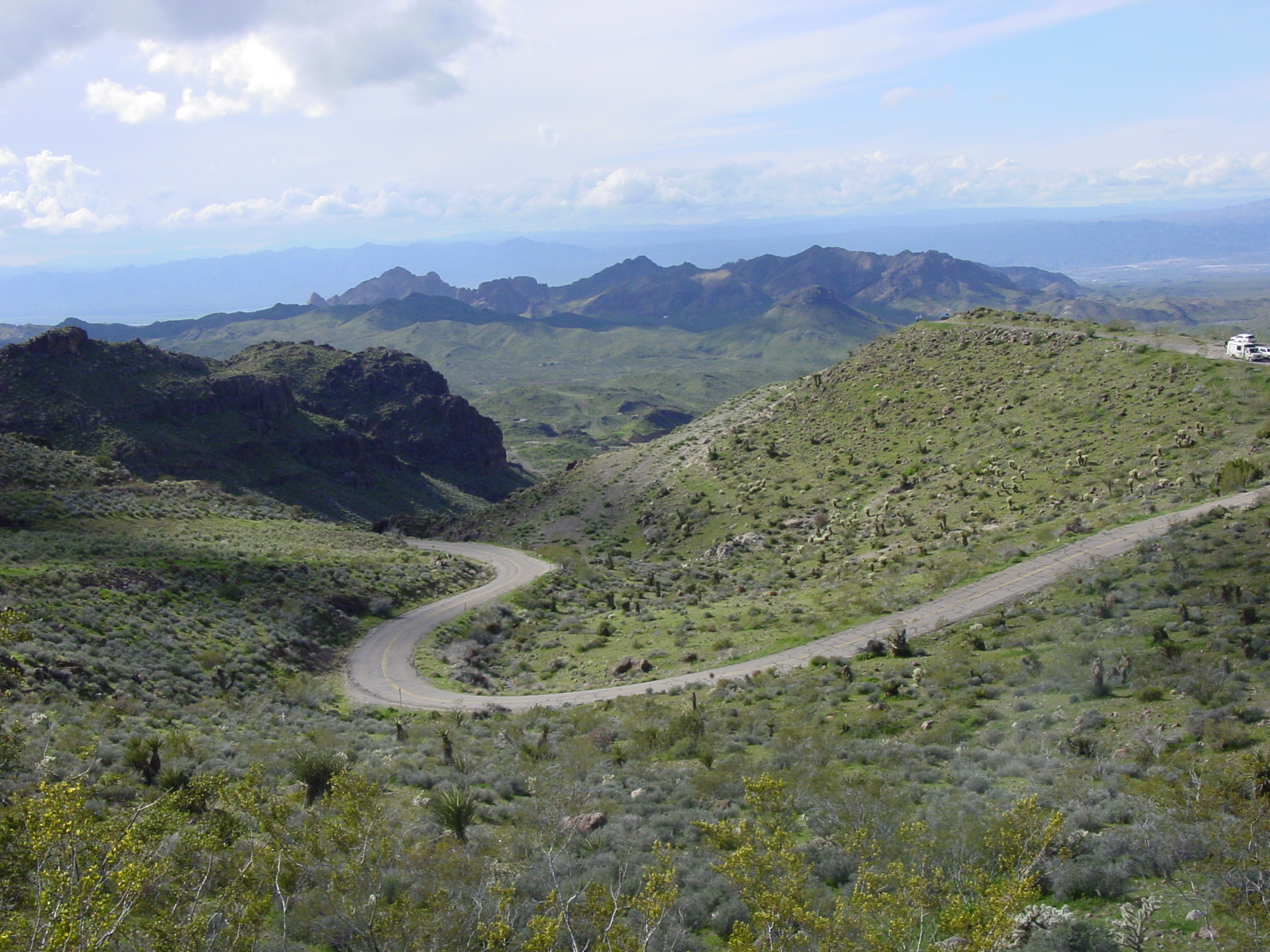
Route 66 just west of the Sitgreaves Pass in Mohave County, Arizona

By the 1950s, many sections of Route 66 had been bypassed by newer, higher-speed alignments. In Arizona, the steep and winding route through the Black Mountains near Oatman was bypassed in 1953 by a more direct highway between Kingman and Needles.

The western terminus subsequently moved east as portions of Route 66 were removed from the U.S. highway system. In 1963, the American Association of State Highway Officials approved California's request to eliminate Route 66 between Santa Monica and the U.S. 95 junction near Needles. The change took effect in stages: signs were initially removed between Santa Monica and Pasadena, leaving Pasadena as the practical western end, while the California Division of Highways continued to show the Pasadena-to-Needles alignment on its maps for several years.

When Interstate 40 was completed through the Bristol Mountains in the early 1970s, Route 66 was finally removed from the remaining Pasadena-to-Needles alignment. Its western terminus moved to the U.S. 95 junction near Needles, effectively at the California-Arizona border.

In 1979, AASHTO approved another truncation, removing Route 66 from the Needles area through most of Arizona and moving the western terminus east to Sanders, Arizona, at the junction with what was then U.S. Route 666. The Arizona Department of Transportation continued to sign portions of the former route west of Sanders for a time, but the U.S. Route 66 designation itself ended at Sanders until the route was fully decommissioned in 1985.

With construction of the Interstate Highway System, Route 66 was progressively bypassed or replaced by Interstate highways. By 1970, Interstate 55 between Chicago and St. Louis and Interstate 44 between St. Louis and Oklahoma City had replaced major portions of the original route. AASHTO accepted the recommendation to eliminate the U.S. 66 designation in 1979, and the remaining sections were removed from the system in 1985.

=== Decline ===
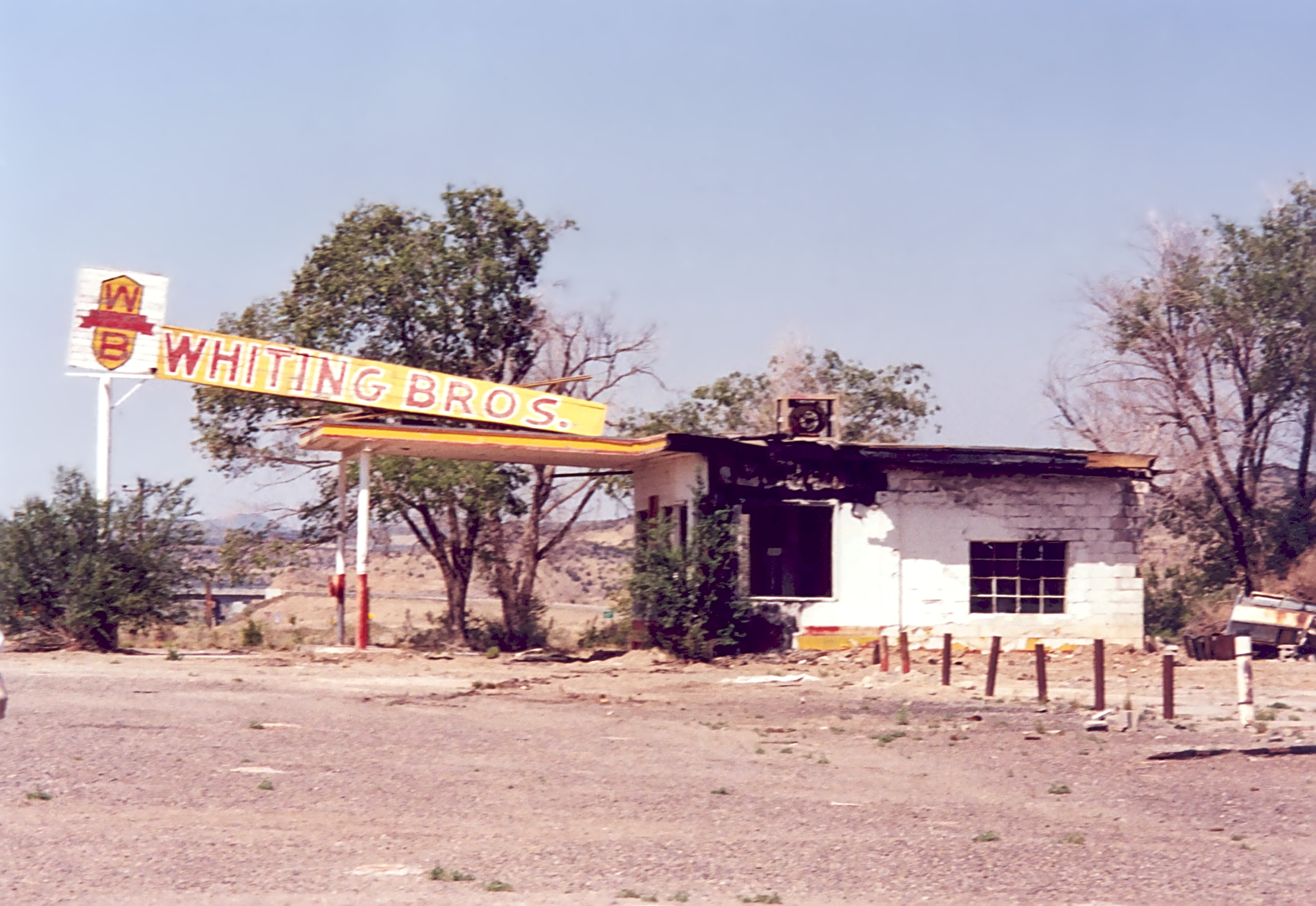
Abandoned Whiting Brothers gas station along former US 66 in San Fidel, New Mexico

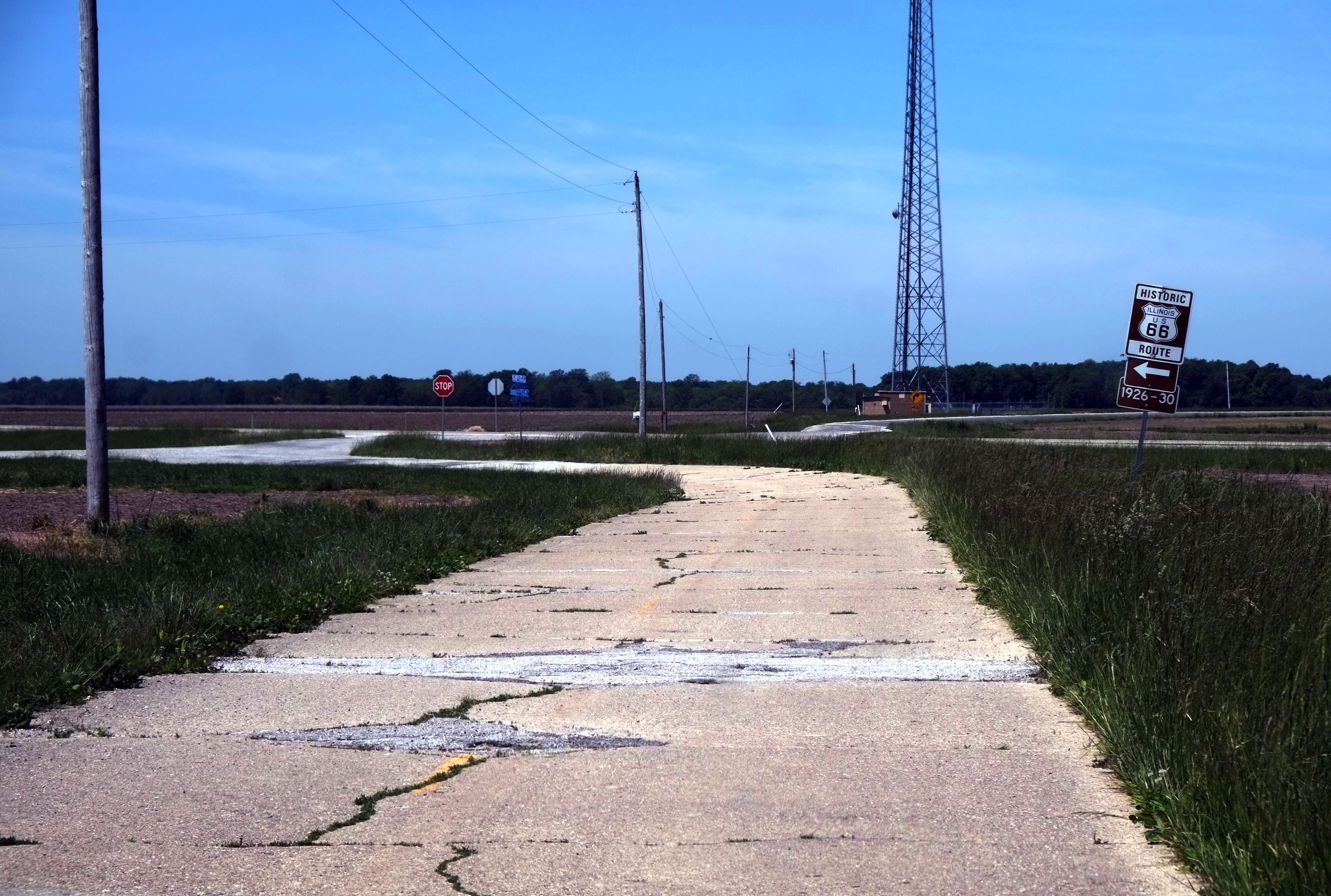
An abandoned early US 66 alignment in Illinois

The decline of U.S. Route 66 began with the passage of the Federal-Aid Highway Act of 1956, which authorized construction of the Interstate Highway System. The new limited-access highways provided faster, more direct routes and gradually replaced older highways such as US 66.

Even before the Interstate era, sections of US 66 had been widened or realigned to accommodate increasing traffic. In states such as Illinois and Missouri, large portions of the highway were expanded to four lanes and included bypasses around towns, many of which were later incorporated into Interstate routes.

In 1953, one of the first major bypasses occurred with the opening of the Turner Turnpike between Tulsa and Oklahoma City, followed by the Will Rogers Turnpike in 1957. These toll roads paralleled US 66 and diverted traffic away from towns along the original route.

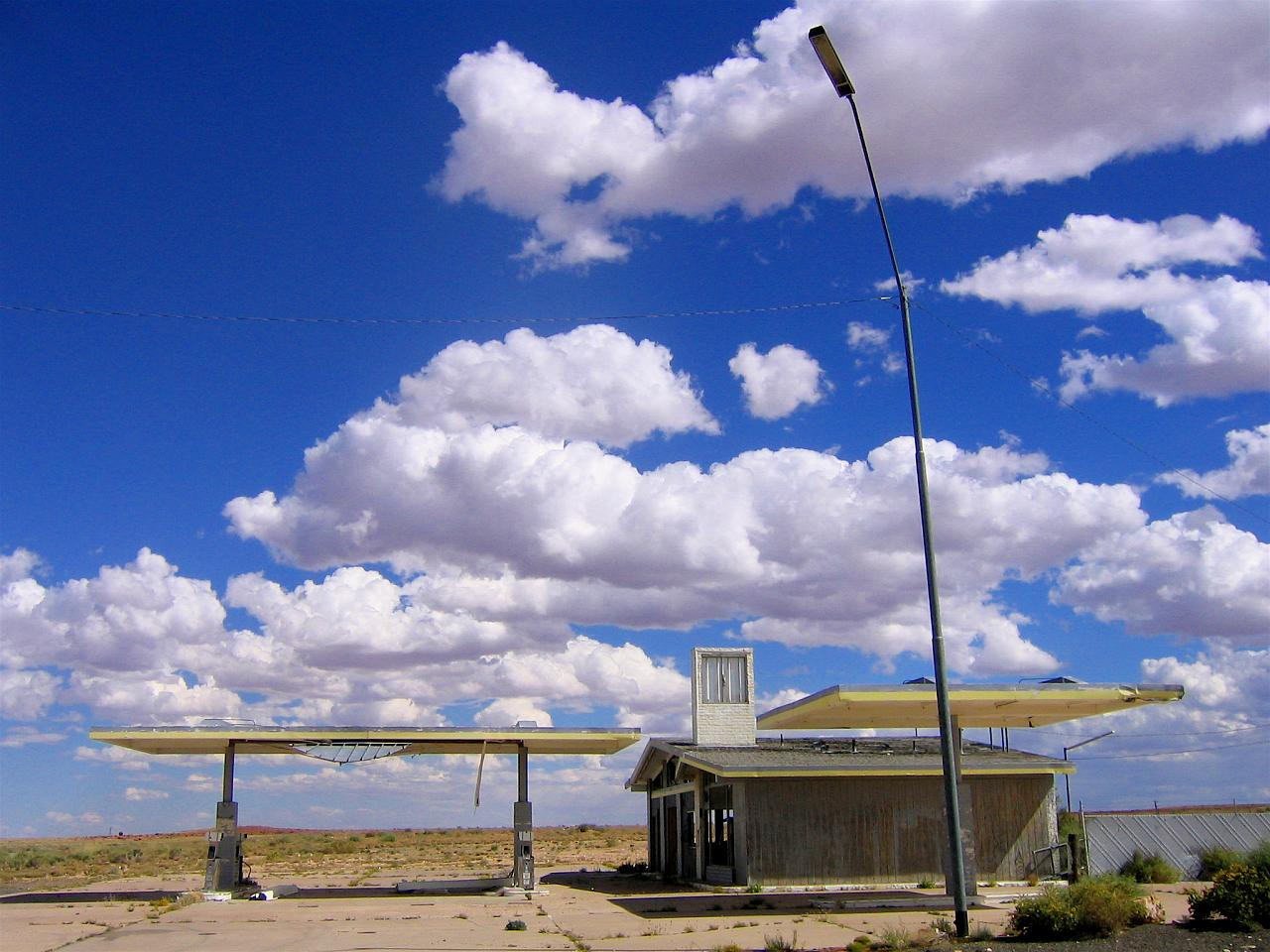
The ghost town of Two Guns, Arizona, once featured a zoo, gift shop, restaurant, campground, gas station and "death cave"

Similar changes occurred across the Southwest. In New Mexico, plans for Interstate 40 encountered resistance from communities concerned about economic impacts, but most towns were eventually bypassed during the 1960s and 1970s. As Interstate construction progressed, traffic increasingly shifted away from US 66.

In several states, local business owners and civic leaders opposed the construction of interstate bypasses, fearing the loss of traffic and revenue. In New Mexico, for example, some communities resisted plans for Interstate 40 to bypass their towns, prompting negotiations over route placement to preserve access to local businesses. Similar concerns were raised elsewhere along US 66 as interstates diverted travelers away from established commercial corridors.

The decline of roadside businesses was accelerated by the 1965 Highway Beautification Act, which restricted roadside advertising along interstate highways, making it more difficult for travelers to locate businesses on older alignments.

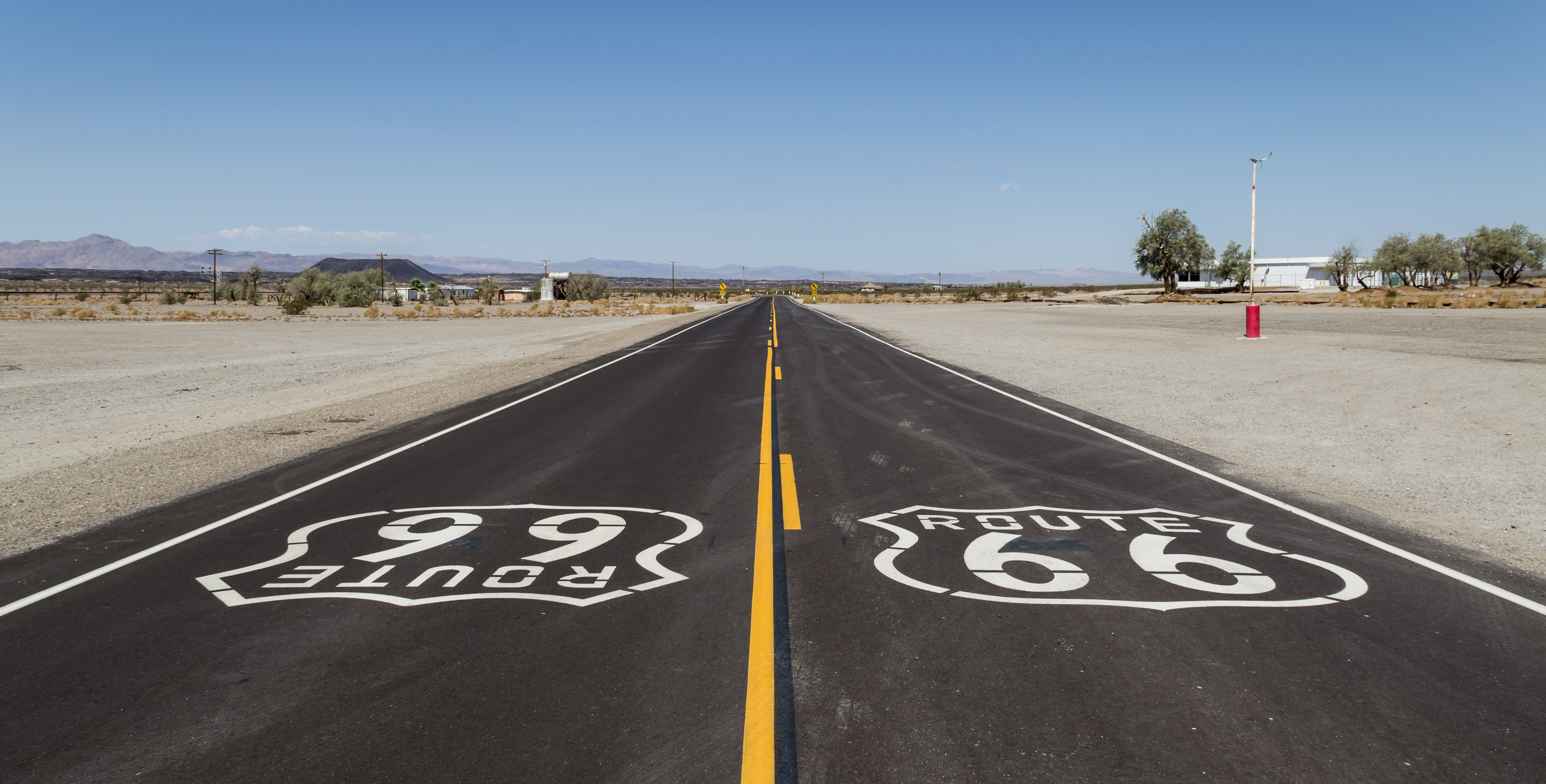
Old Route 66 near Amboy, California

=== Decertification ===
By the late 1970s, most sections of US 66 had been replaced by Interstate highways. The route was gradually decommissioned, and in 1985 the American Association of State Highway and Transportation Officials officially removed US 66 from the United States Highway System.

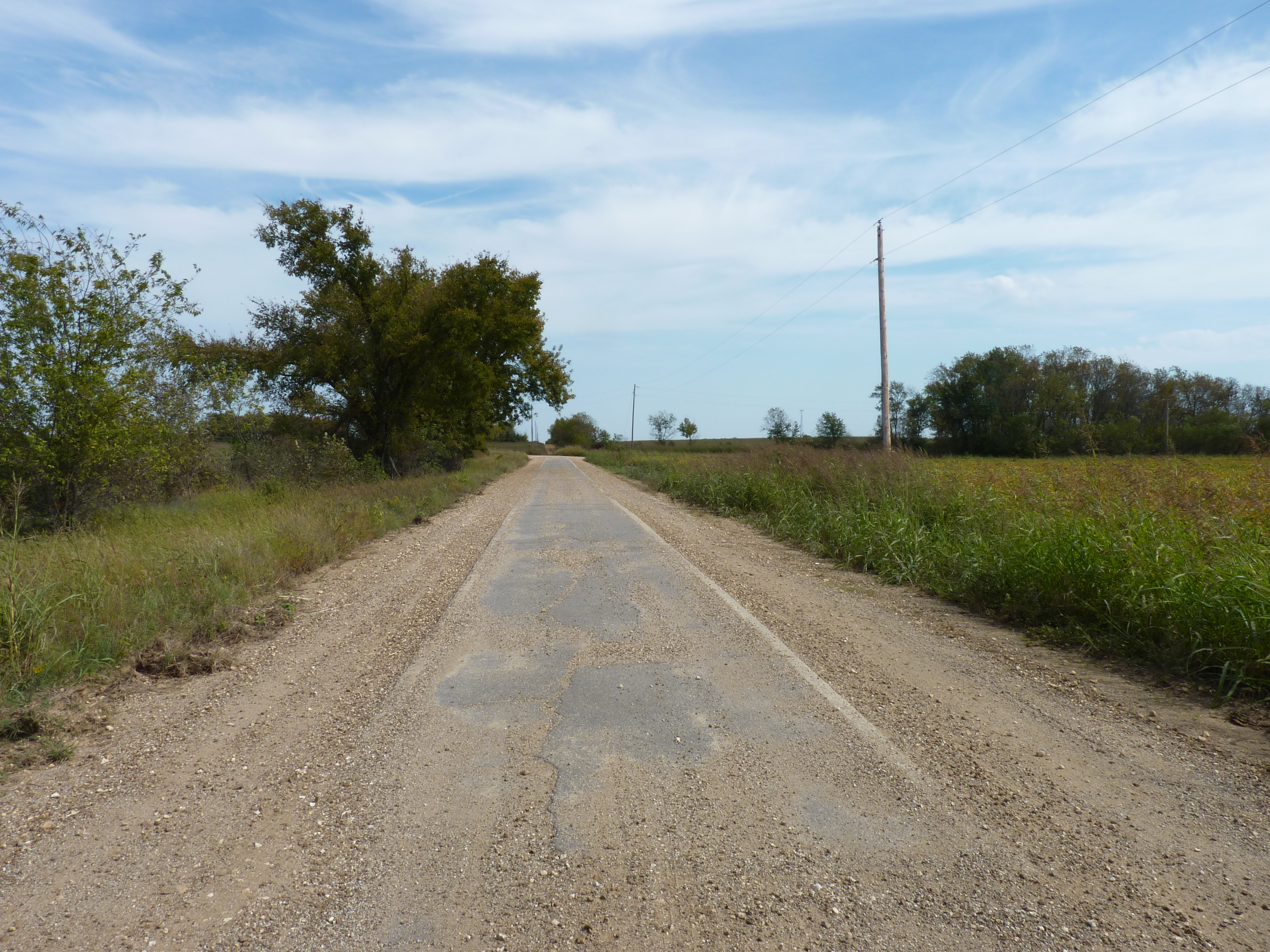
"Sidewalk highway" section of former US 66 near Miami, Oklahoma

Following its decommissioning, segments of former U.S. Route 66 were incorporated into a variety of local, state, and federal road systems. In many urban areas, portions of the route were redesignated as business loops for nearby interstates, while other segments became state highways, local roads, or were abandoned.

Although US 66 no longer exists as an official or continuous route, substantial portions of its original alignment and later realignments remain in use. Some stretches have been preserved in near-original condition, including narrow early alignments known as "sidewalk highways", which consist of a single paved lane with curbs and gravel shoulders.

In several states, portions of the former route retain the "66" designation as part of state highway systems, such as State Highway 66 in Oklahoma and State Route 66 in Arizona. Other segments are marked as "Historic Route 66" and maintained for tourism and preservation purposes. Some municipal roads along the old route have also retained the "66" number.

Preservation efforts by local and national organizations have contributed to the continued visibility of Route 66 as a historic transportation corridor.

=== Revival ===
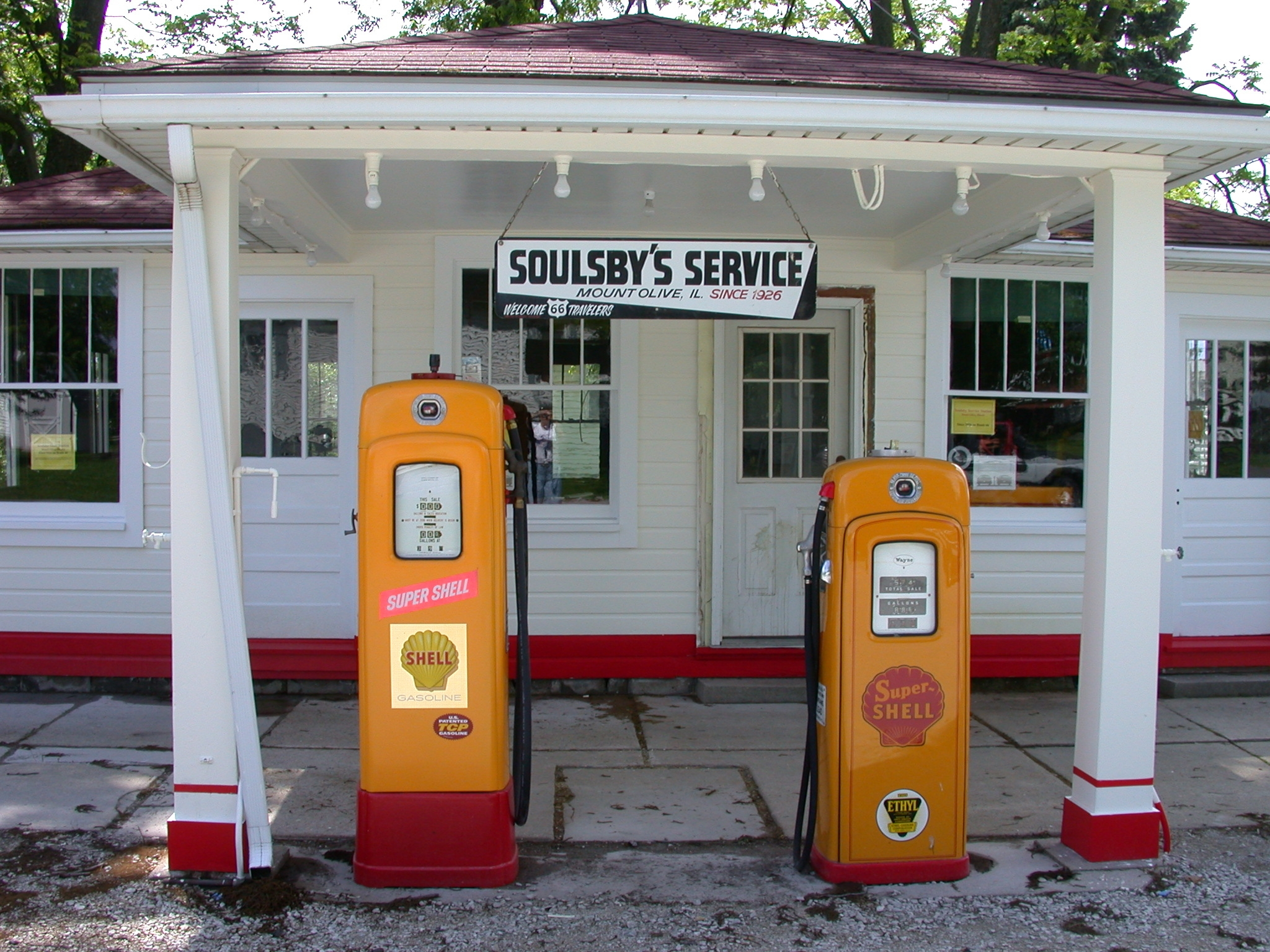
The Soulsby Service Station in Mount Olive, Illinois

==== Early preservation efforts ====
Following the decommissioning of U.S. Route 66, preservation efforts began at the state and local levels. The first Route 66 associations were established in Arizona in 1987 and in Missouri and Illinois shortly thereafter, promoting the preservation and commemoration of the historic highway.

States also began designating surviving segments as "Historic Route 66". In 1990, Missouri declared its portion of the highway a state historic route, a model later followed by other states. Many states and communities now mark the route with highway markers or route shield pavement marking, especially as Route 66 markers are common targets of street sign theft.

==== Federal and national recognition ====
Preservation efforts expanded at the national level in the late 20th century. In 1999, President Bill Clinton signed the National Route 66 Preservation Act, which provided federal support for preserving and restoring historic features along the route.

The National Park Service developed the Route 66 Corridor Preservation Program and a Discover Our Shared Heritage travel itinerary documenting historically significant locations along the route.

In 2008, the World Monuments Fund included Route 66 on its World Monuments Watch, citing threats to historic roadside architecture from development and neglect.

==== Cultural revival and tourism ====
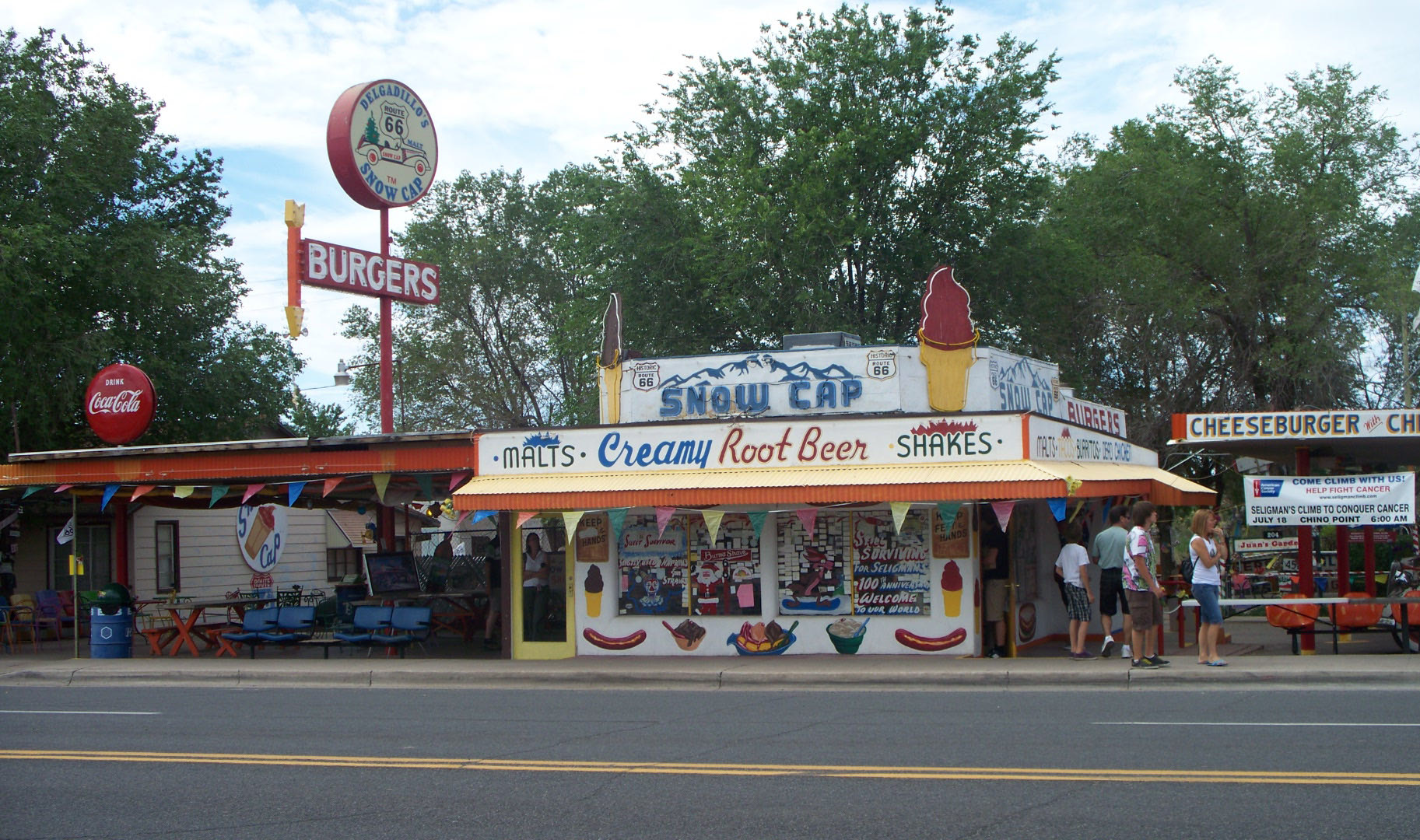
Delgadillo's Snow Cap Drive-In in Seligman, Arizona. The eatery is still a popular tourist stop.

Since the late 20th century, Route 66 has experienced a revival as a heritage tourism destination, attracting both domestic and international travelers. Preservation groups have worked to restore historic motels, gas stations, and neon signage associated with mid-20th-century automobile travel.

Festivals, museums, and local initiatives have contributed to renewed public interest in the route and its cultural significance.

Route 66 is also commemorated in museums and interpretive sites along its former route. Examples include the National Route 66 & Transportation Museum in Elk City, Oklahoma, which covers all eight Route 66 states; the Oklahoma Route 66 Museum in Clinton, Oklahoma, operated by the Oklahoma Historical Society; and the Route 66 Association of Illinois Hall of Fame and Museum in Pontiac, Illinois, which houses Route 66 memorabilia and artifacts. The route is also interpreted by the National Museum of American History in Washington, D.C., in its "America on the Move" exhibition, which highlights the role of highways in American transportation and culture.

==== Modern initiatives ====
Efforts to commemorate and reinterpret Route 66 have continued into the 21st century. Proposals have been made to restore the route as a continuous highway, though these have raised concerns about balancing modernization with historic preservation.

In 2018, the American Association of State Highway and Transportation Officials designated the first sections of U.S. Bicycle Route 66, part of the United States Bicycle Route System, in Kansas and Missouri.

In 2026, the United States Postal Service issued Forever stamps featuring designs from Route 66 to commemorate the route's centennial.

On November 11, 2026, The History Museum on the Square of Springfield, MO buried a time capsule at the historic market site which sits across from the Colonial Hotel, where the idea for the road was first conceived.

== Route description ==
Over the years, U.S. Route 66 received several nicknames. Early in its history it was referred to as "The Great Diagonal Way", reflecting its diagonal alignment across the Midwest. The U.S. Highway 66 Association later promoted it as "The Main Street of America". In John Steinbeck's novel The Grapes of Wrath, the highway was called "The Mother Road", a name that became widely associated with the route.

=== California ===
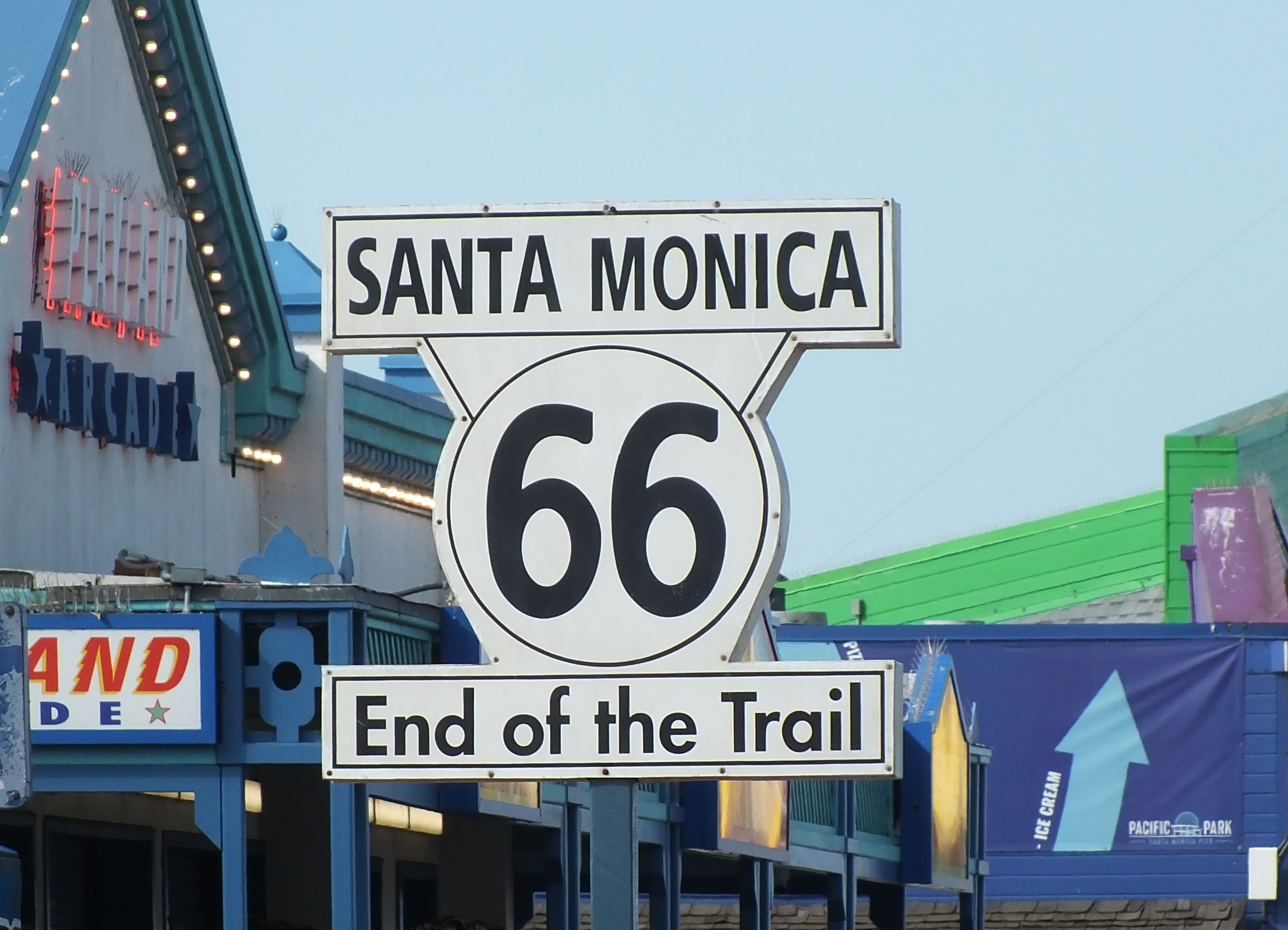
The "symbolic" western end of US 66 is marked with a sign at the Santa Monica Pier. The westernmost and second of four official termini is nine blocks east of this sign.

US 66 ran for approximately 315 miles (507 km) in California, from the Arizona state line to its western terminus in Santa Monica. The highway passed through San Bernardino, Pasadena, and Los Angeles before reaching the Pacific coast at the intersection of Lincoln and Olympic boulevards.

=== Arizona ===
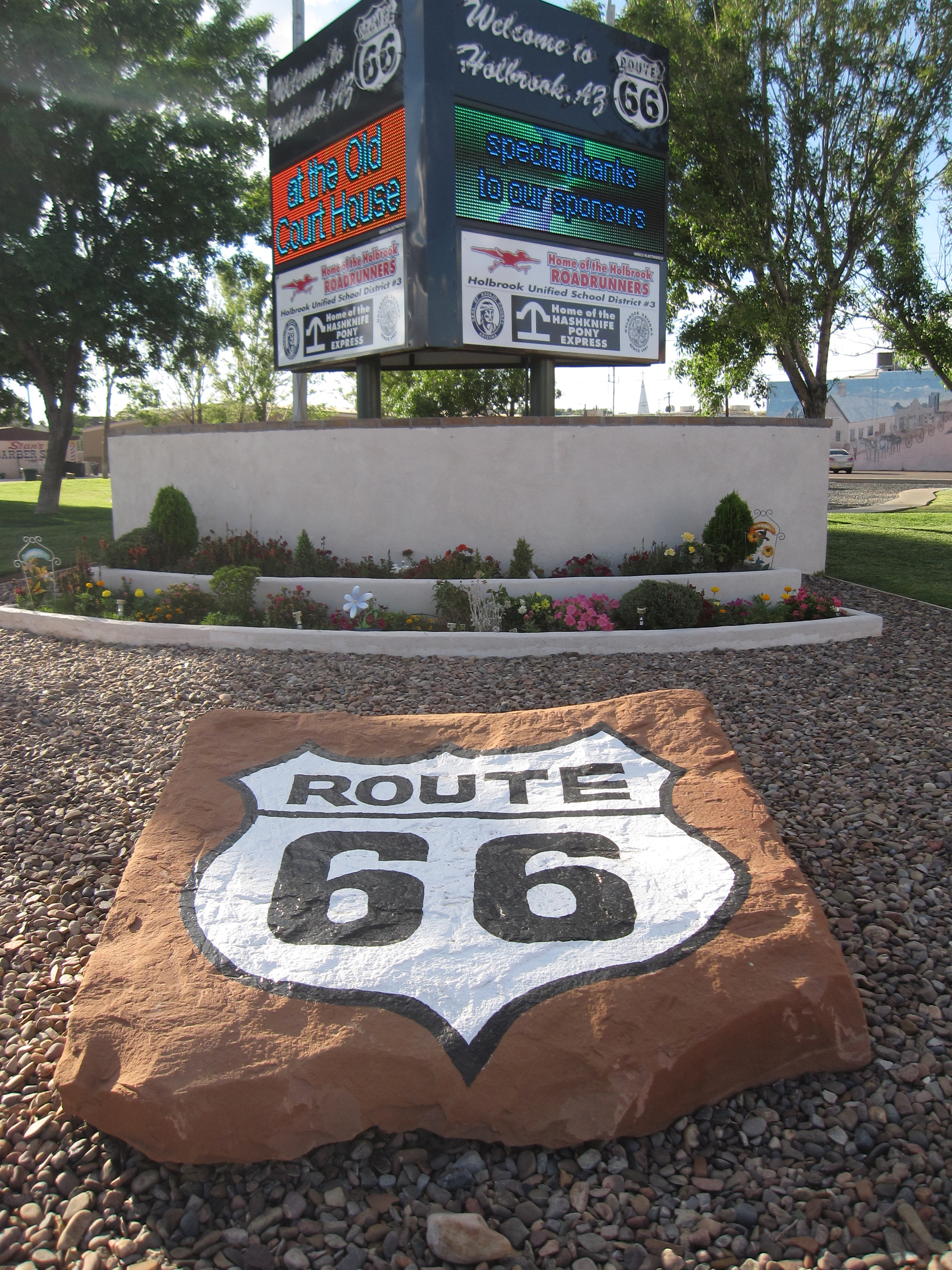
US 66 marker on the corner of Navajo Boulevard and Hopi Drive in Holbrook, Arizona

In Arizona, US 66 covered roughly 401 miles (645 km) and closely paralleled what is now Interstate 40. The route entered near Topock, passed through Kingman, Seligman, and Flagstaff, and continued east toward New Mexico. The town of Williams was the last community on the route to be bypassed by an Interstate highway.

=== New Mexico ===
US 66 covered 380 miles (610 km) in the state and passed through many Indian reservations in the western half of New Mexico. East of those reservations, the highway passed through Albuquerque, Santa Fe, and Tucumcari. As in Arizona, in New Mexico, U.S. 66 paralleled I-40.

=== Texas ===
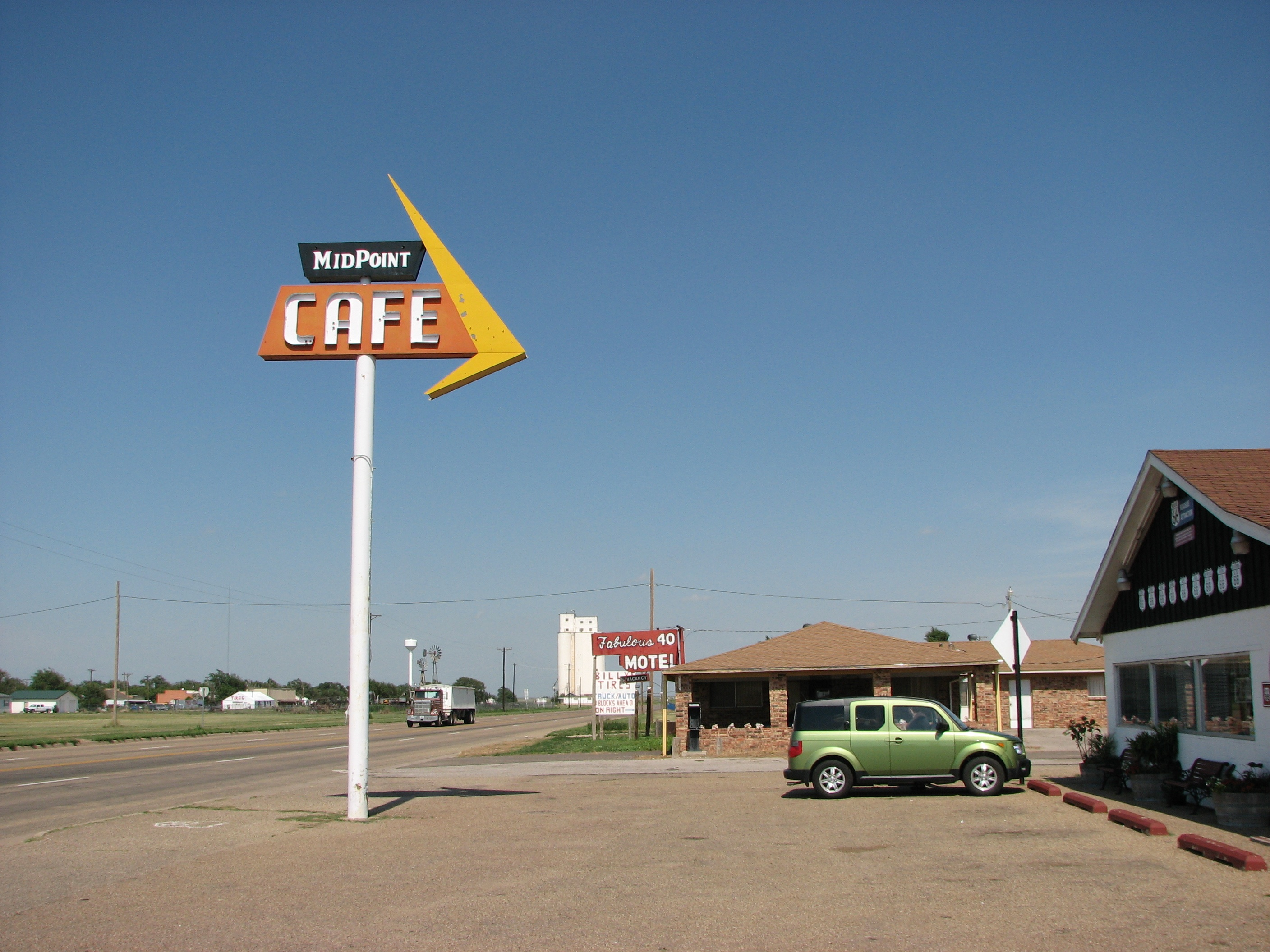
The Midpoint Café in Adrian, Texas, at the midpoint of the route

US 66 covered 178 miles (286 km) in the Texas Panhandle, travelling in an east–west line between Glenrio and Texola. Adrian, in the western Panhandle, was notable as the midpoint of the route. East of there, the highway passed through Amarillo (famous for the Cadillac Ranch), Conway, Groom and Shamrock.

=== Oklahoma ===
U.S. Route 66 ran for approximately 376 miles (605 km) across Oklahoma, generally following a west–east alignment that is now paralleled by Interstate 40 in the western part of the state and by State Highway 66 in the central and northeastern regions. The highway entered the state at Texola and passed through major communities including Elk City, Clinton, Oklahoma City, and Tulsa before continuing toward the Kansas state line.

=== Kansas ===
In Kansas, US 66 covered a short distance of about 13 miles (21 km), passing through Galena, Riverton, and Baxter Springs before entering Missouri.

=== Missouri ===
US 66 covered 292 miles (470 km) in Missouri. Upon entering from Galena, Kansas, the highway passed through Joplin. From there, it passed through Carthage; Springfield, where Red's Giant Hamburg, the world's first drive-thru was located; Lebanon; Waynesville, Devils Elbow; and Rolla before passing through St. Louis.

=== Illinois ===
US 66 covered 301 miles (484 km) in Illinois. It entered Illinois in East St. Louis after crossing the Mississippi River. Near there, it passed by Cahokia Mounds, a UNESCO World Heritage Site. The highway then passed through Hamel, Springfield (passing by the Illinois State Capitol), Bloomington-Normal, Pontiac and Gardner. It then entered the Chicago area, originally through Joliet and later through Plainfield. After passing through the suburbs, U.S. 66 entered Chicago itself on Ogden Avenue, where it terminated at Lake Shore Drive starting in 1938, having originally ended at Michigan Avenue.

== Special routes ==
Several alternate alignments of US 66 occurred because of traffic issues. Business routes (BUS), bypass routes (BYP), alternate routes (ALT) and "optional routes" (OPT) (an early designation for alternate routes) came into being. An Alternate 66 existed in the Los Angeles area. Business routes also existed in San Bernardino, Amarillo, Clinton (OK), Oklahoma City, and Tulsa. Various business, bypass, and alternate routes were located in the Joplin and Springfield (MO) areas and in several locations in Illinois, notably the Joliet Road bypass, which was certified as a result of mining operations by the Vulcan Materials Company causing significant road damage to the original mile stretch.

== In popular culture ==
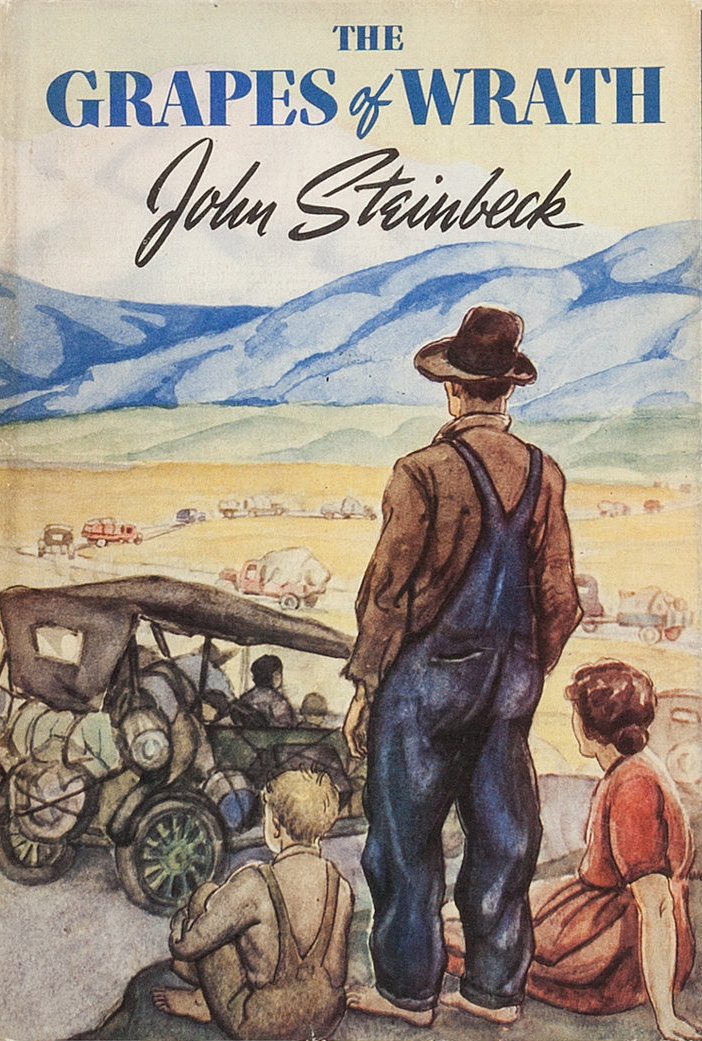
First edition cover of The Grapes of Wrath by John Steinbeck, which popularized the term "Mother Road"

U.S. Route 66 has been widely represented in American popular culture, reflecting its historical role in travel, migration, and the development of automobile culture. The highway was popularized in music by Bobby Troup's 1946 song "(Get Your Kicks on) Route 66", first recorded by Nat King Cole, which became a standard later performed by numerous artists across many genres.

The route also lent its name to the television series Route 66 (1960–1964), which followed two young men traveling across the United States.

In literature, John Steinbeck's novel The Grapes of Wrath (1939) portrays westward migration along US 66 during the Dust Bowl, referring to it as the "Mother Road", a phrase that became closely associated with the highway.

Route 66 has also been depicted in film, including the animated feature Cars (2006), which portrays a fictional town bypassed by an Interstate Highway, reflecting the decline experienced by communities along the route.

In the 21st century, Route 66 has continued to be recognized in popular media. On April 30, 2026, a Google Doodle commemorated the hundredth anniversary of the highway.

== See also ==
- Inland Empire 66ers, named after US 66
- List of landmarks on U.S. Route 66
- List of Route 66 museums
- Phillips 66, a petroleum company named for the route
- Southern Transcon, a railroad line approximately parallel to US 66
