= Plato, Missouri =

- Village
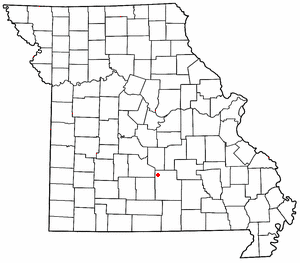
- Coordinates: 37°30′13″N 92°13′30″W
- Country: United States
- State: Missouri
- County: Texas

Area
  - Total: 0.37 sq mi (0.97 km^{2})
  - Land: 0.37 sq mi (0.97 km^{2})
  - Water: 0 sq mi (0.00 km^{2})

Population (2020)
  - Total: 82
  - Density: 218.9/sq mi (84.53/km^{2})
- FIPS code: 29-58088
- GNIS feature ID: 2393231
- Website: www.texascountymissouri.org

Plato is an incorporated village in northwestern Texas County, Missouri, United States. It is located approximately 20 miles northwest of Houston and 10 miles south of Fort Leonard Wood on Route 32. The population was 82 at the 2020 census.

As of the 2010 U.S. census Plato was the mean center of United States population of the distribution of the U.S. population.

== History ==
The community was founded in 1874 and is named after the ancient Greek philosopher Plato.

The Bates-Geers House was listed on the National Register of Historic Places in 1982.

== Geography ==
According to the United States Census Bureau, the village has a total area of 0.38 square miles (0.98 km^{2}), all land.

== Demographics ==
Historical population
Census	Pop.	Note	%±
2010	109		—
2020	82		−24.8%
U.S. Decennial Census

=== 2010 census ===
As of the census of 2010, there were 109 people, 41 households, and 35 families residing in the village. The population density was 286.8 inhabitants per square mile (110.7/km^{2}). There were 48 housing units at an average density of 126.3 per square mile (48.8/km^{2}). The racial makeup of the village was 95.4% White, 1.8% African American, 1.8% Native American, and 0.9% from other races. Hispanic or Latino of any race were 4.6% of the population.

There were 41 households, of which 36.6% had children under the age of 18 living with them, 65.9% were married couples living together, 12.2% had a female householder with no husband present, 7.3% had a male householder with no wife present, and 14.6% were non-families. 14.6% of all households were made up of individuals, and 9.8% had someone living alone who was 65 years of age or older. The average household size was 2.66 and the average family size was 2.83.

The median age in the village was 36.5 years. 28.4% of residents were under the age of 18; 7.4% were between the ages of 18 and 24; 23% were from 25 to 44; 17.4% were from 45 to 64; and 23.9% were 65 years of age or older. The gender makeup of the village was 49.5% male and 50.5% female.

=== Mean center of the United States ===
In March 2011 Plato was declared the 2010 mean center of United States population based on 2010 Census data.

The mean center has been moving southwest through Missouri about 20 to 30 miles per decade since 1980, when it was near DeSoto. In 2000, it was pinpointed as being near Edgar Springs.

== Transportation ==
Waynesville Regional Airport at Forney Field serves the community with air service. Even though it's on Fort Leonard Wood, it is jointly run by the cities of Waynesville and St. Robert and is available for civilian use by private pilots and scheduled commercial passenger service.

- Route 17 is the major north–south route which crosses Interstate 44 at exit 153 at Buckhorn, runs east through Waynesville, turns north to Crocker, and then runs north out of the county to Iberia. South of Interstate 44, Highway 17 hugs the western edge of Fort Leonard Wood, passes near Laquey, and circles south of the post until it runs out of the county and eventually joins Highway 32 in Roby.
- Highway 32 runs west from Route 17 through Plato and continues west through Lynchburg.

== Media ==
The Fort Leonard Wood area has one daily and three weekly print newspapers, as well as an online internet daily newspaper. South of the post, the Houston Herald covers Texas County issues but doesn't regularly cover Plato village or school issues.

KFBD-FM and its AM sister station, KJPW, are the news radio providers in the Pulaski County area, which includes Fort Leonard Wood as well as northern Texas County. These stations compete with the only other station broadcasting from Pulaski County, KFLW Radio, owned by the Lebanon Daily Record and working locally from the St. Robert offices of the Pulaski County Mirror weekly newspaper.

The Daily Guide, commonly known as the Waynesville Daily Guide but based in St. Robert and serving all of Pulaski County, is owned by Gatehouse Media and is the central printing plant for three other Gatehouse newspapers in nearby counties, the daily Camden Lake Sun Leader and Rolla Daily News as well as the weekly St. James Leader-Journal. The Daily Guide covers school sports and the occasional big story in Plato.

The content of the weekly Fort Leonard Wood Guidon is produced under the auspices of Army Public Affairs at Fort Leonard Wood but printed under contract by the Springfield News-Leader, a Gannett-owned newspaper which produces and sells advertisements in the Fort Leonard Wood Guidon. The military contract to produce the Guidon was held by the Lebanon Daily Record until the end of 2002, and before the Lebanon Daily Record had been held by the Waynesville Daily Guide for many years.

== Education ==
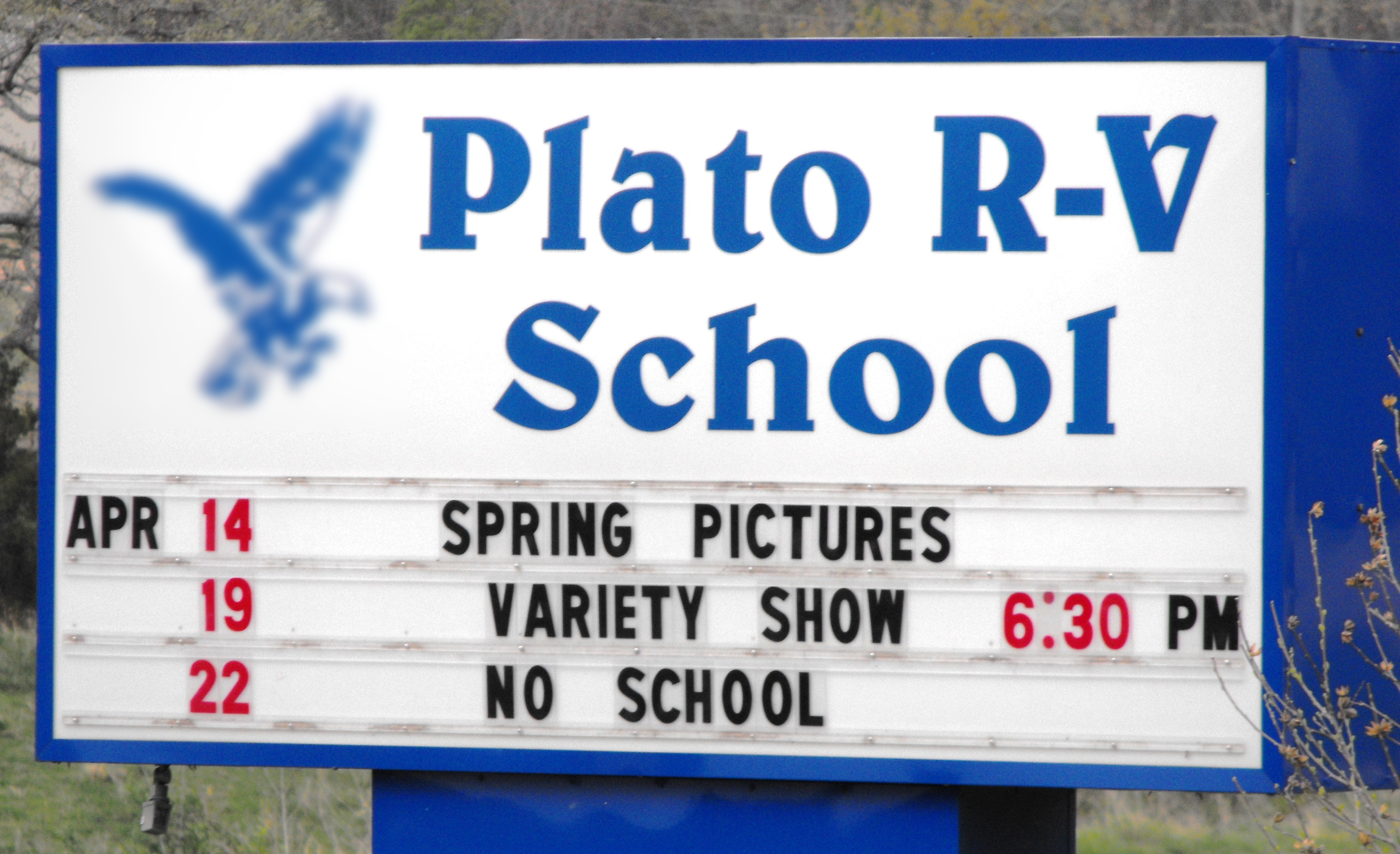
Plato R-V School District

The areas south of Fort Leonard Wood, including the unincorporated Pulaski County communities of Big Piney and Palace, are served by the Plato R-V School District, which is based in the northern Texas County village of Plato but also includes parts of Pulaski, Laclede and Wright counties.

Nearby school districts in Success, Manes and Gasconade, are K-8 districts which don't have a high school. Some students from those districts attend Plato High School after finishing school in their own district.

Fort Leonard Wood is in Pulaski County and a high percentage of military personnel live off post in surrounding communities, especially St. Robert and Waynesville but also the farther-out cities of Richland, Crocker, and Dixon, and the unincorporated communities of Laquey, Swedeborg and Devil's Elbow, all of which have a lower housing cost than nearer housing in St. Robert and Waynesville. Military personnel assigned to training areas on the south end of the post sometimes choose to live in the unincorporated areas of Big Piney and Palace in Pulaski County, or the northern Texas County communities of Plato and Roby.

Seven main school districts are fully or partly within the borders of Pulaski County, not counting two small districts which are mostly within other counties and only have only a few dozen residents within Pulaski County. All seven school districts have a high percentage of Fort Leonard Wood military dependents, and over two-thirds of Waynesville students fall into that category.
