= Bloodland, Missouri =

Extinct hamlet in Missouri, U.S.

Coordinates: 37°41′14″N 92°09′08″W

Bloodland is a former community in southern Pulaski County, Missouri, United States. The community lies within Ft. Leonard Wood. The location is about 3.5 miles west-northwest of the community of Big Piney which sits adjacent to the east boundary of the Fort Leonard Wood and 4.5 miles north of the community of Palace, which is just outside the southern boundary of Fort Leonard Wood.

A post office called Bloodland was established in 1898, and remained in operation until 1941. The community has the name of one Mr. Blood, the original owner of the town site. The town was destroyed to build Ft. Leonard Wood.
