= Helm, Missouri =

Unincorporated community in Missouri, U.S.

Coordinates: 37°59′03″N 92°09′16″W

Helm is an unincorporated community in northeast Pulaski County, in the U.S. state of Missouri. The community is located adjacent to Missouri Route N, just south of Missouri Route 133, between Dixon and Crocker.

The community was named after one Mr. Helm, a land agent.
