= St. John, Pulaski County, Missouri =

Unincorporated community in Missouri, U.S.

Coordinates: 37°53′21″N 92°22′47″W

Saint John is an unincorporated community in western Pulaski County, in the U.S. state of Missouri. The community is located on Missouri Route 133 between Richland to the southwest and Swedeborg to the northeast.

It is unknown why the name "Saint John" was applied to this community.
