= Fort Leonard Wood =

U.S. Army training post in the Missouri Ozarks

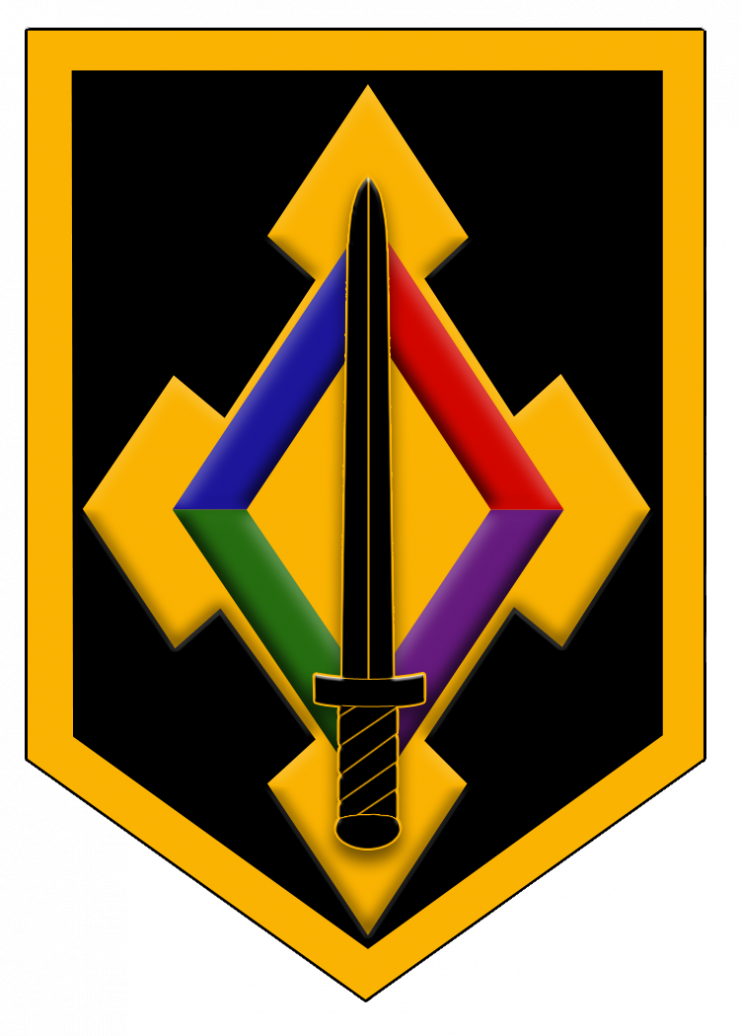
Fort Leonard Wood and The U.S. Army Maneuver Support Center for Excellence (MSCoE)
- eponyms: MG Leonard Wood
- Part of United States Army Transformation and Training Command
- Pulaski County, Missouri, near St. Robert, Missouri
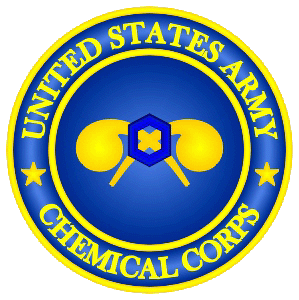
- The schools located on Fort Leonard Wood

Site information
- Type: Army post
- Controlled by: United States Army
- Website: home.army.mil/wood/

Location
- Coordinates: 37°46′21″N 92°06′50″W

Site history
- Built: 1940; 86 years ago
- In use: 1940–present

Garrison information
- Garrison: United States Army Chemical, Biological, Radiological, and Nuclear School; United States Army Engineer School; United States Army Military Police School; United States Army Transportation Corps

Fort Leonard Wood is a U.S. Army training installation located in the Missouri Ozarks. The main gate is located on the southern boundary of the city of St. Robert. The post was created in December 1940 and named in honor of General Leonard Wood (former Chief of Staff) in January 1941. Originally intended to train infantry troops, in 1941 it became an engineer training post with the creation of the Engineer Replacement Training Center. During World War II Italian and German POWs were interned at the fort. In 1984, as part of the Base Realignment and Closure process, most of the U.S. Army Engineer School's operations were consolidated at Fort Leonard Wood. Before that, officer training was conducted at Fort Belvoir, Virginia.

In 1999, again as part of the Base Realignment and Closure process, Fort McClellan, Alabama, was closed, and the U.S. Army Chemical Corps and Military Police Corps schools were transferred to Fort Leonard Wood, which was concurrently redesignated the U.S. Army Maneuver Support Center.

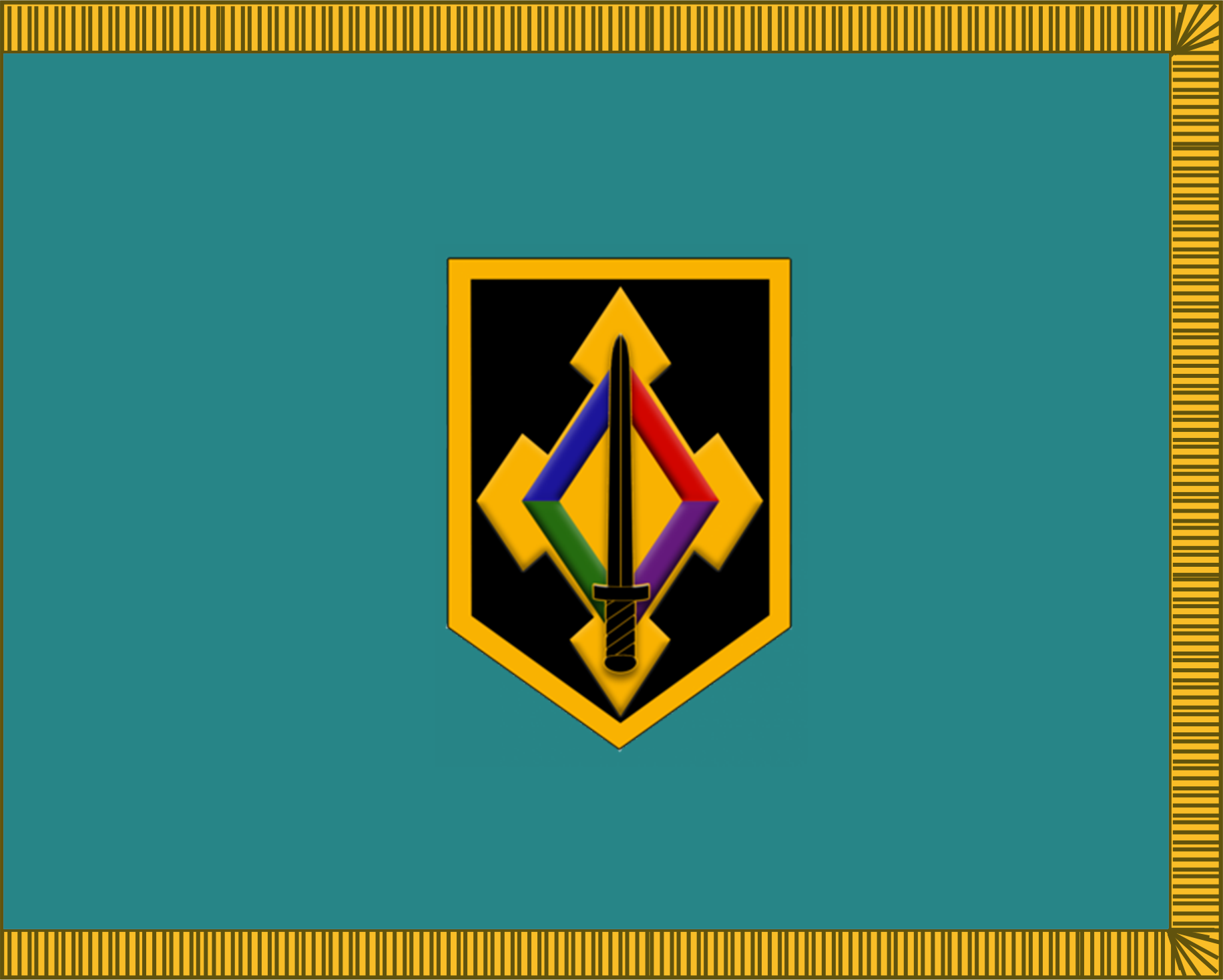
US Army Maneuver Support Center for Excellence Flag

In 2009, the U.S. Army Maneuver Support Center was redesignated the U.S. Army Maneuver Support Center of Excellence (MSCoE); the "center of excellence" designation was placed on almost all U.S. Army training institutions.

The current commanding general is Major General Christopher G. Beck and the command sergeant major is Command Sergeant Major Jorge Arzabala.

== History ==
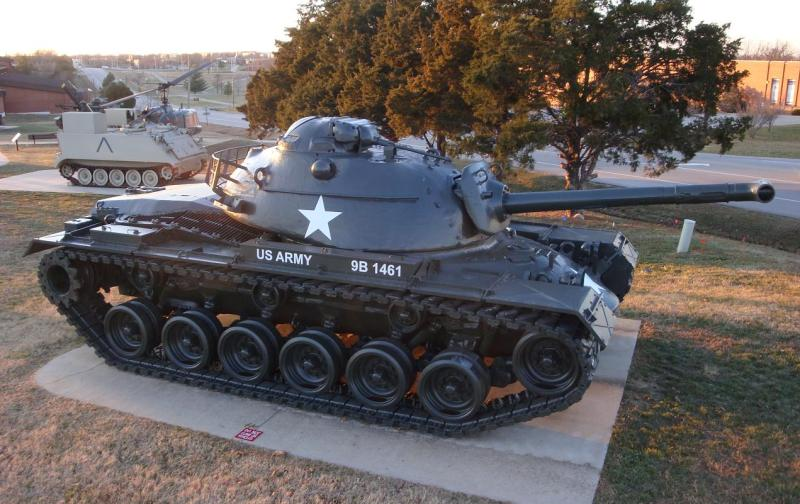
M67A1 Flame Thrower Tank at the U.S. Army Engineer School, Fort Leonard Wood.

Prior to the establishment of the current Fort Leonard Wood, the name was used in 1928 to rename Camp Meade in central Maryland when it was decided that the facility, originally established as a temporary World War I cantonment, would become a permanent military post. However, after a brief time, the change of name was successfully challenged by U.S. legislators from Pennsylvania (where George G. Meade, hero of the Battle of Gettysburg, was from), and the name was changed back to Fort Meade. This left the name "Leonard Wood" unused. In 1939, Congress approved the purchase of a 40,000-acre tract of land near Leon, Iowa, for use as a military reservation, but did not authorize funds to do so at the time. During U.S. precautionary mobilization which began in the summer of 1940, acquisition of the land was approved and U.S. Army Chief of Staff General George C. Marshall approved the construction of a military camp capable of holding 35,000 men on the site, to be named for General Leonard Wood, a former Chief of Staff of the U.S. Army and governor general of Cuba and the Philippines. In the fall, Army officials went to investigate the site prior to the beginning of construction and found that, despite reports to the contrary after World War I, there was a critical shortage of groundwater into which wells could be sunk to produce drinking water. The corps area commander suggested an alternate site immediately adjacent to St. Robert, Missouri.

The installation has historically held a training role under TRADOC (Training and Doctrine Command) rather than a FORSCOM (Forces Command) role, which dates back to its origins in World War II as an engineer replacement training center. During the Gulf War, the 5th Engineer Battalion from the fort saw action in the Middle East.

After the beginning of the U.S. wars in Iraq (2003–2011) and Afghanistan (2001–2021), the 94th Engineer Battalion was restationed from Germany to Fort Leonard Wood, as were the 92nd Military Police Battalion, 193rd Brigade Support Battalion, and 94th Signal Company (part of the 4th Maneuver Enhancement Brigade). The 4th Maneuver Enhancement Brigade was activated at the fort on 2 October 2008 and was inactivated 17 June 2015.

=== 2010 New Year's Eve tornado ===
In the morning hours of 31 December 2010, an EF3 tornado touched down near the post's training and cantonment area (east side of the post). It caused damage to many houses, government buildings, and an old house built during the World War II era. The most damage was in the North Piney Hills Housing Area. There were only minor injuries.

== Geography ==
Fort Leonard Wood is located at 37°44′17″N 92°7′2″W (37.738191, −92.117275).

According to the United States Census Bureau, the post has a total area of 97.6 square miles (252.8 km^{2}), of which 97.2 square miles (251.7 km^{2}) is land and 0.4 square miles (1.1 km^{2}) (0.43%) is water.

== Demographics ==
Historical population
| Census | Pop. | Note | %± |
|---|---|---|---|
| 1970 | 33,799 | | — |
| 1980 | 21,262 | | −37.1% |
| 1990 | 15,863 | | −25.4% |
| 2000 | 13,666 | | −13.8% |
| 2010 | 15,061 | | 10.2% |
| 2020 | 15,959 | | 6.0% |
U.S. Decennial Census

The post is a Census-designated place (CDP), and as of the census of 2000, there were 13,667 people, 2,639 households, and 2,335 families residing in the CDP. The population density was 140.6 people per square mile (54.3 people/km^{2}). There were 3,151 housing units at an average density of 32.4 units per square mile (12.5 units/km^{2}). The racial makeup of the CDP was 64.8% White, 21.6% African American, 1.1% Native American, 2.4% Asian, 0.5% Pacific Islander, 5.0% from other races, and 4.7% from two or more races. Hispanic or Latino of any race were 11.4% of the population.

There were 2,639 households, out of which 71.5% had children under the age of 18 living with them, 80.0% were married couples living together, 5.8% had a female householder with no husband present, and 11.5% were non-families. 7.0% of all households were made up of individuals, and none had someone living alone who was 65 years of age or older. The average household size was 3.32 and the average family size was 3.54.

In the CDP, the population was spread out, with 27.8% under the age of 18, 35.0% from 18 to 24, 35.8% from 25 to 44, 1.3% from 45 to 64, and 0.1% who were 65 years of age or older. The median age was 21 years. For every 100 females, there were 158.3 males. For every 100 females age 18 and over, there were 181.4 males.

The median income for a household in the CDP was $33,891, and the median income for a family was $34,354. Males had a median income of $24,732 versus $20,421 for females. The per capita income for the CDP was $11,652. About 2.7% of families and 4.1% of the population were below the poverty line, including 4.6% of those under age 18 and none of those age 65 or over.

== Initial Entry Training ==
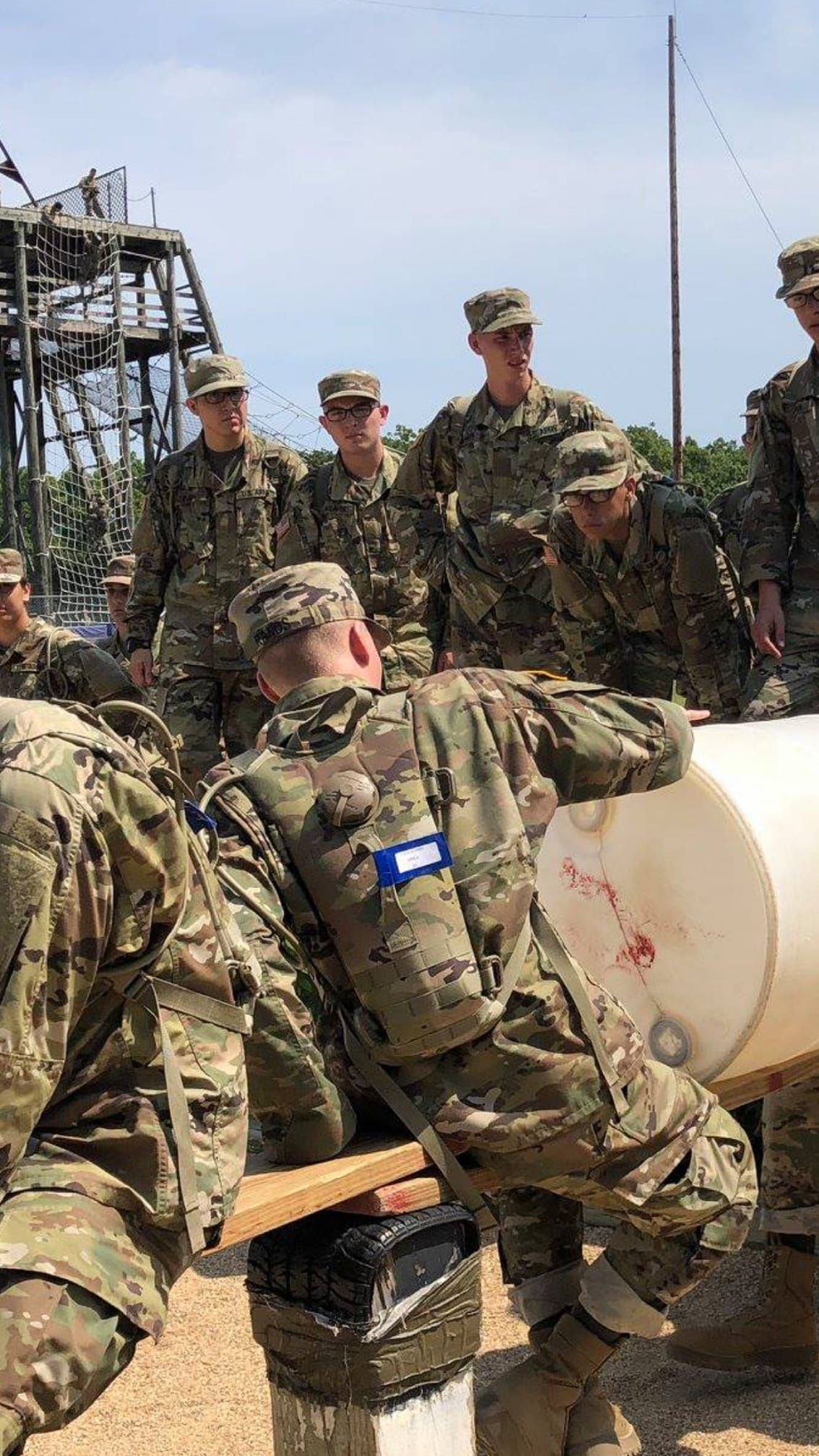
BCT trainees attempt teamwork course at Fort Leonard Wood (June 2018).

The Maneuver Support Center of Excellence offers Basic Combat Training (BCT) for most non-combat arms soldiers, and Advanced Individual Training (AIT) for MOS (Military Occupational Specialty) 88M (motor transport operator) and MOS 74D (Chemical, Biological, Radiological, and Nuclear specialists). It also provides non-combat engineer MOS training, OSUT (One Station Unit Training) for combat engineers and bridging engineers (MOS 12B and 12C), and AIT for military police (31B, 31K & 31E). All training is gender integrated as is Fort Jackson.

Newly commissioned second lieutenants in the CBRN, Engineer, and Military Police branches attend the Basic Officer Leader Course Phase B at the Maneuver Support Center of Excellence.

== Continuing education ==
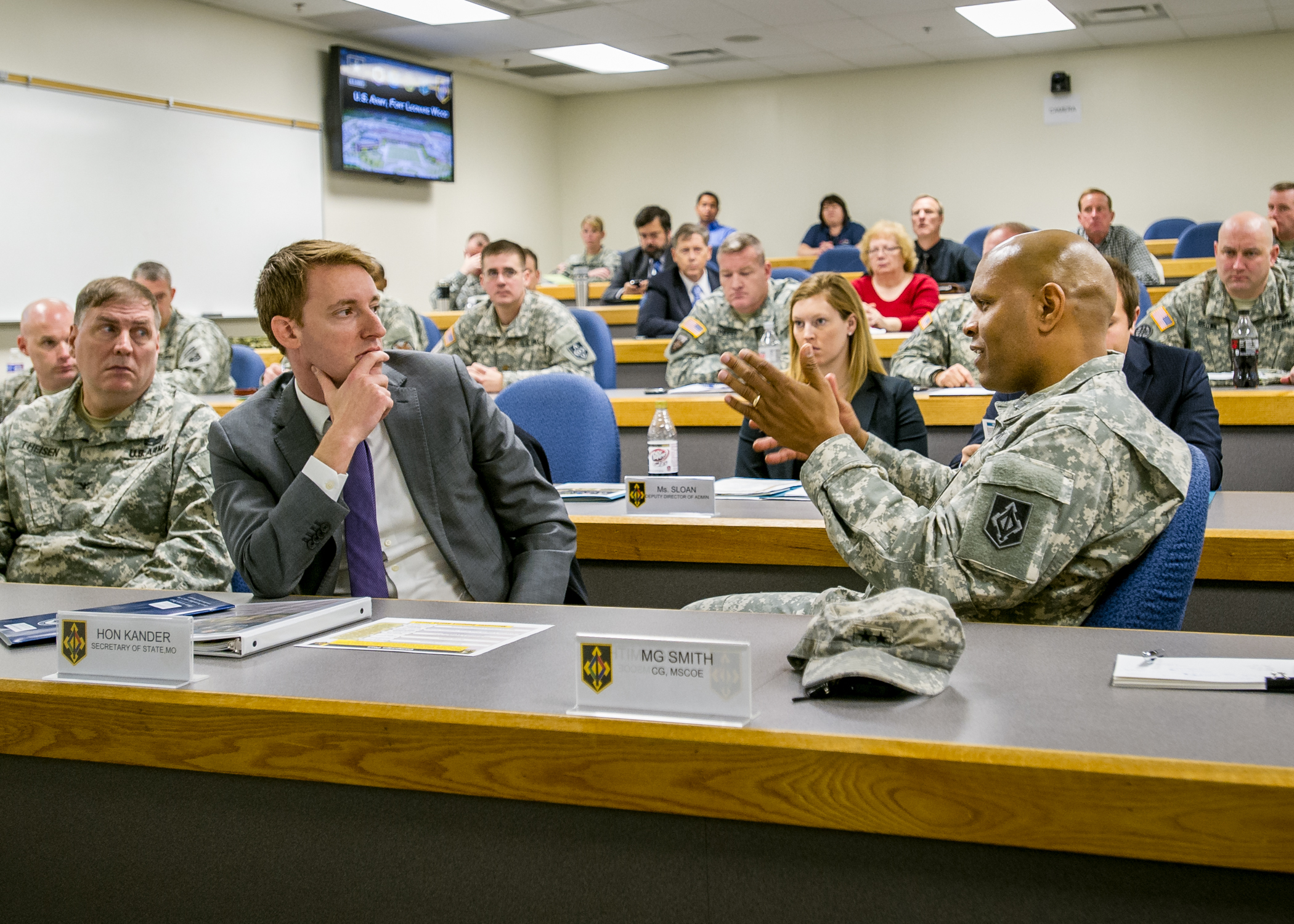
Then Missouri Secretary of State Jason Kander visits Fort Leonard Wood in November 2013. Kander previously worked there as an instructor.

The Maneuver Support Center of Excellence NCO Academy conducts the Senior and Advanced Leader Courses for the Chemical, Engineer, and Military Police branches, the Advanced Leader Course for Ordnance NCOs in MOS 62B, and the Warrior Leader Course for all Army NCO MOSs.

Initial Training for commissioned officers (BOLC) entering the Chemical, Engineer, and Military Police branches are all conducted at Fort Leonard Wood.

The CBRN, Engineer, and Military Police schools provide professional military education and functional courses for soldiers, non-commissioned officers, warrant officers, and commissioned officers, including but not limited to the Captains Career Course and the Battalion and Brigade Pre-Command Courses.

== Transportation ==
Waynesville-St. Robert Regional Airport provides the community with air service. Although it is on Fort Leonard Wood, the airport is jointly run by the cities of Waynesville and St. Robert, and is available for civilian use by private pilots and scheduled commercial passenger service.

The major east–west route is Interstate 44; before its construction, the main highway was U.S. Route 66, which still exists as a scenic route through the area and passes through Devil's Elbow, St. Robert, Waynesville, Buckhorn, and Hazelgreen. Names for U.S. Route 66 vary – at different places, it is called Teardrop Road, Highway Z, Old Route 66, Historic Route 66, and Route 17. State-posted signs mark most of the alignment of the road.

Major north–south routes include:

- Route 133 runs north from Interstate 44, exit 145, approximately two miles east of Hazelgreen to Richland, Swedeborg, Crocker, and about two miles west of Dixon, then north out of the county.
- Route 7 runs north from Interstate 44, exit 150 about three miles west of Buckhorn to Richland, then north out of the county toward the Lake of the Ozarks region.
- Route 17 crosses Interstate 44 at exit 153 at Buckhorn, runs east through Waynesville, turns north to Crocker, and then runs north out of the county to Iberia. South of Interstate 44, Highway 17 hugs the western edge of Fort Leonard Wood, passes near Laquey, and circles south of the post until it runs out of the county and eventually joins Highway 32 in Roby.
- Highway T runs north from Highway 17 at Waynesville to Swedeborg, where it meets and ends at Highway 133 about halfway between Richland and Crocker.
- Route 28 crosses Interstate 44 at exit 163 at the eastern edge of St. Robert, runs north through Dixon, and then runs north out of the county.
- A secondary road parallels Missouri 28, beginning as Highway Y at exit 161 of Interstate 44 in St. Robert, running north to the Gasconade River bridge, where it becomes the county-maintained Cave Road and turning north as Highway O until it meets Highway 28, a few miles south of Dixon.

Major attractions along U.S. Route 66 include the Old Stagecoach Stop in downtown Waynesville, which is now a museum but began as a tavern and boarding house and is the oldest standing structure in the county. It was used as a Civil War hospital for Union troops who were garrisoned above the city in Fort Wayne, which was demolished after the war. The Old Courthouse Museum in downtown Waynesville is near the Old Stagecoach Stop. Three bridges cross the Gasconade River at Devil's Elbow—the modern Interstate 44 bridge, the later U.S. Route 66 alignment on Highway Z that was made possible by the Hooker Cut through a steep hillside, and the original U.S. Route 66 alignment on Teardrop Road that includes a historic bridge that is in the process of renovation. The Elbow Inn is a biker bar that is a frequent stop on the original U.S. Route 66 alignment.

Fort Leonard Wood also has its own post utility railway connecting to the national railway system. The rail system is operated by a contractor, Base Services, Inc., primarily carrying heavy equipment in support of the training center. Consisting of 27 miles of track, 18 of which connect the post with BNSF Railway at Bundy Junction, its operations are conducted from Monday through Friday, 0800 to 1600. The system uses two EMD GP10 locomotives numbered USA 4606 and USA 4607 and one GP40-2 numbered USA 4654. Previous motive power consisted of USA 2002 and USA 2024, EMD SW8 locomotives built in 1951 that had been used by army railway operating battalions in the Korean War. The post also had two GE 80-ton centercab locomotives for on-post switching.

Most of the main line between the post and Bundy Junction has a grade 1.5% grade, and in some places it reaches 3%. The grade is so steep that only 20 cars can be pulled at a time up or down the mainline. The line has four sidings used for storing rail cars. At one time the line had centralized traffic control (CTC) signals, but today the signals and CTC equipment are long gone.

At one time, Fort Leonard Wood featured a busy rail operation. Not only did it receive vehicles and containers by rail, but also boxcars full of goods and equipment, coal for the post power plant, propane for various functions around post, and even diesel fuel for vehicles.

Today all that remains are half a dozen tracks with loading ramps on the ends, located in a warehouse area. In addition, there is a small staging yard next to the warehouses, an engine house and a small wye. The engine house was extended so that both locomotives can fit inside.

== Media ==
Fort Leonard Wood is in Pulaski County and a high percentage of military personnel live off post in surrounding communities, especially St. Robert and Waynesville but also the farther-out cities of Richland, Crocker, and Dixon, and the unincorporated communities of Laquey, Swedeborg and Devil's Elbow, all of which have a lower housing cost than nearer housing in St. Robert and Waynesville. Military personnel assigned to training areas on the south end of the post sometimes choose to live in the unincorporated areas of Big Piney and Palace in Pulaski County, or the northern Texas County communities of Plato and Roby.

The area has one daily and three weekly print newspapers, as well as an online internet daily newspaper. The county also has two internet discussion sites, the Pulaski County Web and Pulaski County Insider.

KFBD-FM and its AM sister station, KJPW, are among the news providers in the Pulaski County area, which includes Fort Leonard Wood, Waynesville, and St. Robert.

KFLW Radio is owned by Ozark Media and is the only locally owned and operated radio station in Pulaski County. KFLW 98.9 The Fort is heavily involved in the local communities it serves and is known for its support of not only Fort Leonard Wood, but military service members in general.

The content of the weekly Fort Leonard Wood Guidon is produced under the auspices of Army Public Affairs at Fort Leonard Wood but printed under contract by the Springfield News-Leader, a Gannett-owned newspaper which produces and sells advertisements in the Fort Leonard Wood Guidon.

The Daily Guide, commonly known as the Waynesville Daily Guide but based in St. Robert and serving the entire county, is owned by Gatehouse Media and is the central printing plant for three other Gatehouse newspapers in nearby counties, the daily Lake Sun, based in Camdenton, and Rolla Daily News as well as the weekly St. James Leader-Journal.

The weekly Pulaski County Mirror is owned by the Lebanon Daily Record, a family owned newspaper in an adjoining county. The paper is a merger of the Richland Mirror and Pulaski County Democrat in St. Robert, which were separate weekly papers owned by the Lebanon Daily Record until their owner merged them in 2009.

The weekly Dixon Pilot is privately owned by a resident of Dixon.

The Pulaski County Breaking News internet newspaper is privately owned by a Former Devils Elbow resident.

The Pulaski County Daily News internet newspaper is privately owned by a St. Robert resident.

The Pulaski County Insider is run by a group of St. Robert and Waynesville residents and maintained and hosted by a Potosi resident.

The Pulaski County Web is run and maintained by a Devil's Elbow resident and former St. Robert businessman.

== Education ==
The Fort Leonard Wood army installation is within the Waynesville R-VI School District. which is by far the largest in the county. Four of the school district's elementary schools are on post, while the remainder of the schools, including Waynesville High School, are off post.

== Preservation ==
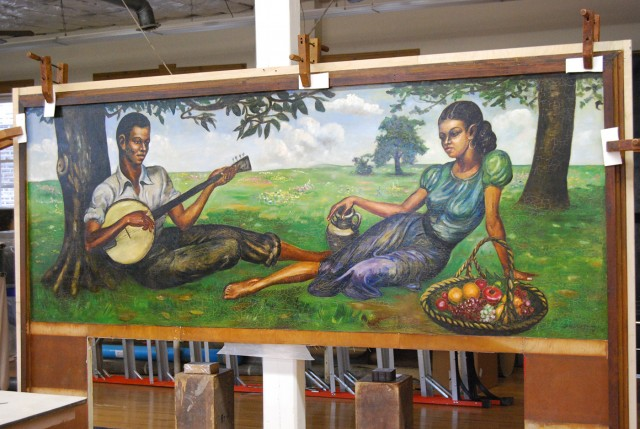
Samuel Countee's c. 1942 mural, Fort Leonard Wood's Countee Hall. Photo from 2017.

In 2019, Fort Leonard Wood's Black Officer's Club was renamed SSG Samuel A. Countee Hall in honor of Staff Sergeant Samuel A. Countee, an artist who painted a mural inside the club. The building and the mural were restored around the same time. In 2021, the National Trust for Historic Preservation recognized this preservation work with its Federal Partnerships in Historic Preservation Award.

== See also ==
- Chemical Corps
- U.S. Army Corps of Engineers
- U.S. Army Military Police Corps
