= Crocker, Missouri =

- City
- Crocker in October 2026

- Location of Crocker, Missouri
- Coordinates: 37°56′52″N 92°16′03″W
- Country: United States
- State: Missouri
- County: Pulaski
- Platted: 1869
- Incorporated: 1872
- Named for: Uriel Crocker

Government
  - Mayor: Jim Patton

Area
  - Total: 1.24 sq mi (3.22 km^{2})
  - Land: 1.24 sq mi (3.22 km^{2})
  - Water: 0 sq mi (0.00 km^{2})
- Elevation: 1,083 ft (330 m)

Population (2020)
  - Total: 929
  - Density: 747.9/sq mi (288.77/km^{2})
- Time zone: UTC-6 (Central (CST))
  - Summer (DST): UTC-5 (CDT)
- ZIP code: 65452
- Area code: 573
- FIPS code: 29-17344
- GNIS feature ID: 2393675

Crocker is a city in Pulaski County, Missouri, United States. The population was 929 at the 2020 census.

== History ==
Crocker was platted in 1869, and named after South Pacific Railroad shareholder Uriel Crocker. Beginning as early as the 1920s, Uriel Crocker was often misidentified as Eurilis J. Crocker. A post office called Crocker has been in operation since 1872.

== Geography ==
Crocker is located on a ridge north of the Gasconade River and east of Tavern Creek. The town is served by Missouri routes 17 and 133.

According to the United States Census Bureau, the city has a total area of 1.24 square miles (3.21 km^{2}), all land.

== Demographics ==
Historical population
Census	Pop.	Note	%±
1920	506		—
1930	522		3.2%
1940	453		−13.2%
1950	712		57.2%
1960	821		15.3%
1970	814		−0.9%
1980	979		20.3%
1990	1,077		10.0%
2000	1,033		−4.1%
2010	1,110		7.5%
2020	929		−16.3%
U.S. Decennial Census

=== 2010 census ===
As of the census of 2010, there were 1,110 people, 433 households, and 278 families residing in the city. The population density was 895.2 inhabitants per square mile (345.6/km^{2}). There were 525 housing units at an average density of 423.4 per square mile (163.5/km^{2}). The racial makeup of the city was 95.9% White, 0.5% African American, 0.8% Native American, 0.1% Asian, 0.5% from other races, and 2.3% from two or more races. Hispanic or Latino of any race were 2.8% of the population.

There were 433 households, of which 39.3% had children under the age of 18 living with them, 45.5% were married couples living together, 11.3% had a female householder with no husband present, 7.4% had a male householder with no wife present, and 35.8% were non-families. 31.6% of all households were made up of individuals, and 13.9% had someone living alone who was 65 years of age or older. The average household size was 2.55 and the average family size was 3.21.

The median age in the city was 33.5 years. 29.9% of residents were under the age of 18; 7.7% were between the ages of 18 and 24; 25.5% were from 25 to 44; 23.1% were from 45 to 64; and 13.6% were 65 years of age or older. The gender makeup of the city was 49.8% male and 50.2% female.

=== 2000 census ===
As of the census of 2000, there were 1,033 people, 425 households, and 277 families residing in the city. The population density was 868.4 inhabitants per square mile (335.3/km^{2}). There were 517 housing units at an average density of 434.6 per square mile (167.8/km^{2}). The racial makeup of the city was 97.29% White, 0.29% African American, 1.36% Native American, 0.39% Pacific Islander, 0.10% from other races, and 0.58% from two or more races. Hispanic or Latino of any race were 0.68% of the population.

There were 425 households, out of which 36.2% had children under the age of 18 living with them, 49.4% were married couples living together, 11.1% had a female householder with no husband present, and 34.8% were non-families. 32.5% of all households were made up of individuals, and 15.8% had someone living alone who was 65 years of age or older. The average household size was 2.41 and the average family size was 3.04.

In the city the population was spread out, with 28.4% under the age of 18, 8.2% from 18 to 24, 29.4% from 25 to 44, 16.9% from 45 to 64, and 17.0% who were 65 years of age or older. The median age was 36 years. For every 100 females there were 89.9 males. For every 100 females age 18 and over, there were 85.5 males.

The median income for a household in the city was $29,583, and the median income for a family was $35,750. Males had a median income of $26,964 versus $16,141 for females. The per capita income for the city was $13,401. About 13.9% of families and 17.5% of the population were below the poverty line, including 22.1% of those under age 18 and 19.2% of those age 65 or over.

== Transportation ==
Waynesville Regional Airport at Forney Field serves the community with air service; although it is on Fort Leonard Wood, it is jointly run by the cities of Waynesville and St. Robert and is available for civilian use by private pilots and scheduled commercial passenger service.

The major east–west route is Interstate 44; before that, the main highway was U.S. Route 66, which still exists as a scenic route through the area and passes through Devil's Elbow, St. Robert, Waynesville, Buckhorn, and Hazelgreen. Names for Route 66 vary - at different places, it is called Teardrop Road, Highway Z, Old Route 66, Historic Route 66, and Highway 17. State-posted signs mark most of the alignment of the road.

Major north–south routes near Crocker include:

- Route 133 runs north from Interstate 44, exit 145, approximately two miles east of Hazelgreen to Richland, Swedeborg, Crocker, and about two miles west of Dixon, then north out of the county.
- Route 17 crosses Interstate 44 at exit 153 at Buckhorn, runs east through Waynesville, turns north to Crocker, and then runs north out of the county to Iberia. South of Interstate 44, Route 17 hugs the western edge of Fort Leonard Wood, passes near Laquey, and circles south of the post until it runs out of the county and eventually joins Highway 32 in Roby.
- Missouri Route T runs north from Route 17 at Waynesville to Swedeborg, where it meets and ends at Highway 133, about halfway between Richland and Crocker.

== Education ==
Crocker R-II School District operates one elementary school and Crocker High School.

Crocker has a public library, a branch of the Pulaski County Library District.
