= Collie Hollow =

Valley in Missouri, United States

Coordinates: 37.8475402°N 92.2690582°W

Collie Hollow is a valley in Pulaski County in the U.S. state of Missouri.

A variant spelling is "Colly Hollow". The valley has the name of Cyrus Colley, a pioneer citizen.
