= Hooker, Missouri =

Ghost town in Missouri, U.S.

Coordinates: 37°51′36″N 92°03′39″W

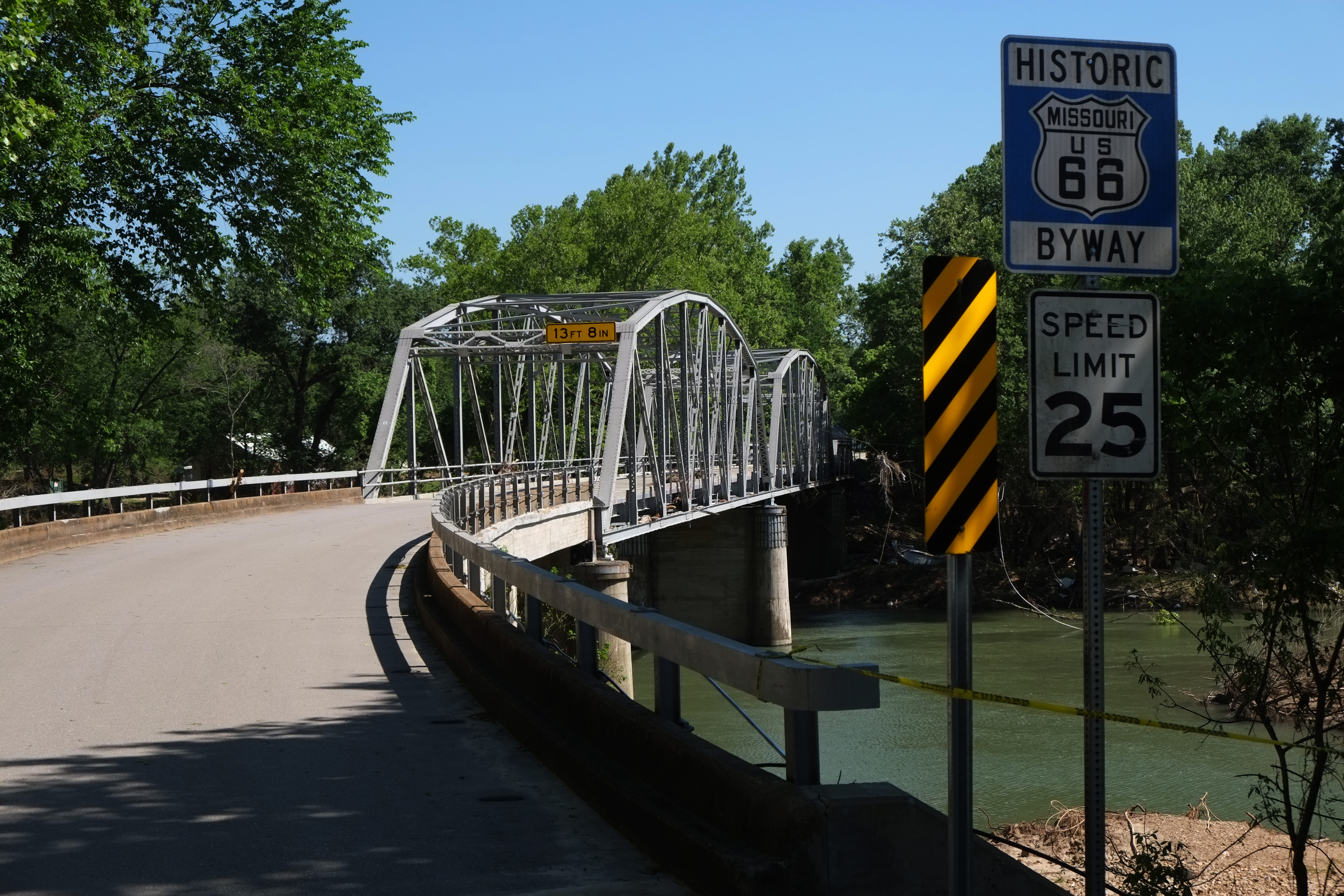
A 1923 bridge near Hooker, Missouri

Hooker is a ghost town in Pulaski County, Missouri, United States, along the former U.S. Route 66 (now Missouri Supplemental Route Z). The GNIS classifies it as a populated place. Built on a new alignment of US 66 (which bypassed the town of Devils Elbow), nothing remains of the town except the Hooker Cemetery, in which many of the former residents and local families are buried.

A post office called Hooker was established in 1900, and remained in operation until 1955. The community was named after one Mr. Hooker, the original owner of the town site.
