= St. John, Missouri (disambiguation) =

St. John, Missouri is a city in St. Louis County, Missouri.

St. John, Missouri may also refer to:

- St. John, Pulaski County, Missouri, an unincorporated community
- St. John, Putnam County, Missouri, an unincorporated community
