= Richland, Missouri =

- City
- Richland in October 2026

- Location of Richland, Missouri
- Coordinates: 37°51′40″N 92°23′58″W
- Country: United States
- State: Missouri
- Counties: Pulaski, Camden, Laclede

Area
  - Total: 2.29 sq mi (5.93 km^{2})
  - Land: 2.27 sq mi (5.87 km^{2})
  - Water: 0.023 sq mi (0.06 km^{2})
- Elevation: 1,099 ft (335 m)

Population (2020)
  - Total: 1,734
  - Density: 764.7/sq mi (295.27/km^{2})
- Time zone: UTC-6 (Central (CST))
  - Summer (DST): UTC-5 (CDT)
- ZIP code: 65556
- Area code: 573
- FIPS code: 29-61562
- GNIS feature ID: 2396365
- Website: richlandmo.info

Richland is a city in Camden, Laclede, and Pulaski counties in the U.S. state of Missouri. As of the 2020 census, Richland had a population of 1,734.

== History ==
Richland was originally called Lyon, and under the latter name was platted in 1869. The present name is after G. W. Rich, a railroad official. A post office called Richland has been in operation since 1869.

The Calloway Manes Homestead was listed on the National Register of Historic Places in 1980.

== Geography ==
Richland is on the western border of Pulaski County and extends into the southeast corner of Camden County and the northeast corner of Laclede County. The town sits on a ridge two miles north of the Gasconade River.

According to the United States Census Bureau, the city has a total area of 2.29 square miles (5.93 km^{2}), of which 2.27 square miles (5.88 km^{2}) is land and 0.02 square miles (0.05 km^{2}) is water.

== Demographics ==
Historical population
Census	Pop.	Note	%±
1880	360		—
1890	553		53.6%
1900	736		33.1%
1910	884		20.1%
1920	955		8.0%
1930	945		−1.0%
1940	985		4.2%
1950	1,133		15.0%
1960	1,662		46.7%
1970	1,783		7.3%
1980	1,922		7.8%
1990	2,029		5.6%
2000	1,805		−11.0%
2010	1,863		3.2%
2020	1,734		−6.9%
U.S. Decennial Census

=== 2020 census ===
As of the 2020 census, Richland had a population of 1,734. The median age was 42.4 years. 23.5% of residents were under the age of 18 and 19.6% of residents were 65 years of age or older. For every 100 females there were 86.9 males, and for every 100 females age 18 and over there were 85.1 males age 18 and over.

0.0% of residents lived in urban areas, while 100.0% lived in rural areas.

There were 729 households in Richland, of which 30.0% had children under the age of 18 living in them. Of all households, 36.5% were married-couple households, 22.1% were households with a male householder and no spouse or partner present, and 34.0% were households with a female householder and no spouse or partner present. About 35.5% of all households were made up of individuals and 15.7% had someone living alone who was 65 years of age or older.

There were 863 housing units, of which 15.5% were vacant. The homeowner vacancy rate was 3.9% and the rental vacancy rate was 12.3%.

Racial composition as of the 2020 census
Race	Number	Percent
White	1,546	89.2%
Black or African American	9	0.5%
American Indian and Alaska Native	10	0.6%
Asian	13	0.7%
Native Hawaiian and Other Pacific Islander	4	0.2%
Some other race	16	0.9%
Two or more races	136	7.8%
Hispanic or Latino (of any race)	60	3.5%

=== 2010 census ===
As of the census of 2010, there were 1,863 people, 804 households, and 482 families living in the city. The population density was 820.7 inhabitants per square mile (316.9/km^{2}). There were 926 housing units at an average density of 407.9 per square mile (157.5/km^{2}). The racial makeup of the city was 94.1% White, 1.1% African American, 0.4% Native American, 0.5% Asian, 0.2% Pacific Islander, 0.6% from other races, and 3.1% from two or more races. Hispanic or Latino of any race were 2.8% of the population.

There were 804 households, of which 30.7% had children under the age of 18 living with them, 38.6% were married couples living together, 16.9% had a female householder with no husband present, 4.5% had a male householder with no wife present, and 40.0% were non-families. 35.3% of all households were made up of individuals, and 16.3% had someone living alone who was 65 years of age or older. The average household size was 2.27 and the average family size was 2.90.

The median age in the city was 39.6 years. 24.5% of residents were under the age of 18; 8.6% were between the ages of 18 and 24; 22.8% were from 25 to 44; 25.6% were from 45 to 64; and 18.5% were 65 years of age or older. The gender makeup of the city was 47.6% male and 52.4% female.

=== 2000 census ===
As of the census of 2000, there were 1,805 people, 806 households, and 490 families living in the city. The population density was 795.7 inhabitants per square mile (307.2/km^{2}). There were 932 housing units at an average density of 410.8 per square mile (158.6/km^{2}). The racial makeup of the city was 96.34% White, 0.17% African American, 0.66% Native American, 0.44% Asian, 0.17% Pacific Islander, 0.55% from other races, and 1.66% from two or more races. Hispanic or Latino of any race were 1.55% of the population.

There were 806 households, out of which 28.5% had children under the age of 18 living with them, 44.3% were married couples living together, 12.9% had a female householder with no husband present, and 39.1% were non-families. 35.6% of all households were made up of individuals, and 17.2% had someone living alone who was 65 years of age or older. The average household size was 2.18 and the average family size was 2.81.

In the city the population was spread out, with 24.0% under the age of 18, 6.9% from 18 to 24, 25.4% from 25 to 44, 22.4% from 45 to 64, and 21.2% who were 65 years of age or older. The median age was 40 years. For every 100 females, there were 82.3 males. For every 100 females age 18 and over, there were 78.5 males.

The median income for a household in the city was $22,821, and the median income for a family was $30,583. Males had a median income of $25,781 versus $18,527 for females. The per capita income for the city was $14,209. About 17.5% of families and 23.5% of the population were below the poverty line, including 34.6% of those under age 18 and 20.9% of those age 65 or over.

== Transportation ==
Waynesville-St. Robert Regional Airport (Forney Field) serves the community with air service. Although it is located within Fort Leonard Wood, it is jointly run by the cities of Waynesville and St. Robert and is available for civilian use by private pilots and scheduled commercial passenger service.

An airfield in Richland's industrial park is available for private pilots but has no scheduled commercial service.

The major east–west route is Interstate 44; before that, the main highway was U.S. Route 66, which still exists as a scenic route through the area and passes through Devil's Elbow, St. Robert, Waynesville, Buckhorn, and Hazelgreen. Names for U.S. Route 66 vary - at different places, it is called Teardrop Road, Highway Z, Old Route 66, Historic Route 66, and Highway 17. State-posted signs mark most of the alignment of the road.

Major north–south routes near Richland include:

- Missouri Route 133 runs north from Interstate 44, exit 145, approximately two miles east of Hazelgreen to Richland, Swedeborg, Crocker, and about two miles west of Dixon, then north out of the county.
- Missouri Route 7 runs north from Interstate 44, exit 150, about three miles west of Buckhorn to Richland, then north out of the county toward the Lake of the Ozarks region.
- Missouri Route T runs north from Missouri Route 17 at Waynesville to Swedeborg, where it meets and ends at Route 133 about halfway between Richland and Crocker.

== Media ==
Pulaski County has one weekly print newspaper, as well as an online internet daily newspaper. The county also has two internet discussion sites, the Pulaski County Web and Pulaski County Insider. The weekly newspaper, the Dixon Pilot, regularly covers the Pulaski County area.

KFBD-FM and its AM sister station, KJPW, are the dominant news radio providers in the Pulaski County area, which includes Fort Leonard Wood, Waynesville, and St. Robert. These stations compete with the only other station broadcasting from Pulaski County, KFLW Radio, owned by the Lebanon Daily Record and working locally from the St. Robert offices of the Pulaski County Mirror weekly newspaper.

Gatehouse Media is the central printing plant for three Gatehouse newspapers in nearby counties, the daily Camden Lake Sun Leader and Rolla Daily News as well as the weekly St. James Leader-Journal.

The content of the weekly Fort Leonard Wood Guidon is produced under the auspices of Army Public Affairs at Fort Leonard Wood, but printed under contract by the Springfield News-Leader, a Gannett-owned newspaper which produces and sells advertisements in the Guidon.

The Pulaski County Daily News internet newspaper is privately owned by a Waynesville resident.

The Pulaski County Insider is run and maintained by a businessman from St. Robert and hosted by a Potosi resident.

== Education ==
The city of Richland and surrounding rural areas are served by the Richland R-IV School District, which extends into rural parts of adjacent counties.

The Richland High School academic team is known statewide for its 13 Class 2A state titles in the last 14 years. The team has currently won seven in a row. This is the most prolific winning record statewide in this particular competition. The team has previously been coached by Roger Stephens since the Richland team was created. Assistant Coach Bob Brown was with the team for eight years until his sudden passing. The 2009 State Championship was won after a game with St. Paul Lutheran, in which the score was 280–275. The 2019-20, & 2020-21 Scholar Bowl Team is Coached by Eldon Haun, and Assisted by James Schwartz.

Richland has a public library, a branch of the Pulaski County Library District.
