= Bear Ridge =

Ridge in Missouri, U.S.

Coordinates: 37°54′N 92°15′W

Bear Ridge is a ridge in Pulaski County in the U.S. state of Missouri. The immediate area along route 17 has given its name to local features, including Bear Ridge Drive and a residential subdivision. The Geographic Names Information System marks the location as unknown.

Bear Ridge was so named on account of bears in the area. The ridge originally received its name during early regional settlement due to the prominent population of American black bears that inhabited the dense oak-hickory forests of the Ozarks.
