= Franks, Missouri =

Unincorporated community in Missouri, U.S.

Coordinates: 37°57′10″N 92°02′13″W

Franks is an unincorporated community in Pulaski County, Missouri, United States.

== History ==
A post office called Franks was in operation from 1889 until 1954. The community has the name of Frank Stanzel, a local tradesman.
