= Shady Grove, Pulaski County, Missouri =

Unincorporated community in Missouri, U.S.

Coordinates: 37°51′31″N 92°16′41″W

Shady Grove is an unincorporated community in Pulaski County, Missouri, United States.

Shady Grove once had a schoolhouse, Shady Grove School.
