= Tavern Township, Pulaski County, Missouri =

Township in Pulaski County, Missouri, U.S.

Coordinates: 37.9661°N 92.2981°W

Tavern Township is an inactive township in Pulaski County, in the U.S. state of Missouri.

Tavern Township takes its name from Tavern Creek.
