= David Day (Missouri politician) =

American politician

Member of the Missouri House of Representatives from the 148th district
- In office 2005 – December 31, 2012

Personal details
- Born: May 5, 1963 (age 63) Waynesville, MO
- Party: Republican
- Spouse: Leasa Day
- Children: Savanna Day
- Occupation: Farmer, Musician, Politician

David A. Day is a Republican former member of Missouri House of Representatives, representing Camden, Laclede, and Pulaski Counties (District 148). Elected to the House in 2004, in 2006 Day was appointed as chairman of the House Veteran's Committee and served in that position until he left office at the end of 2012 due to term limits.

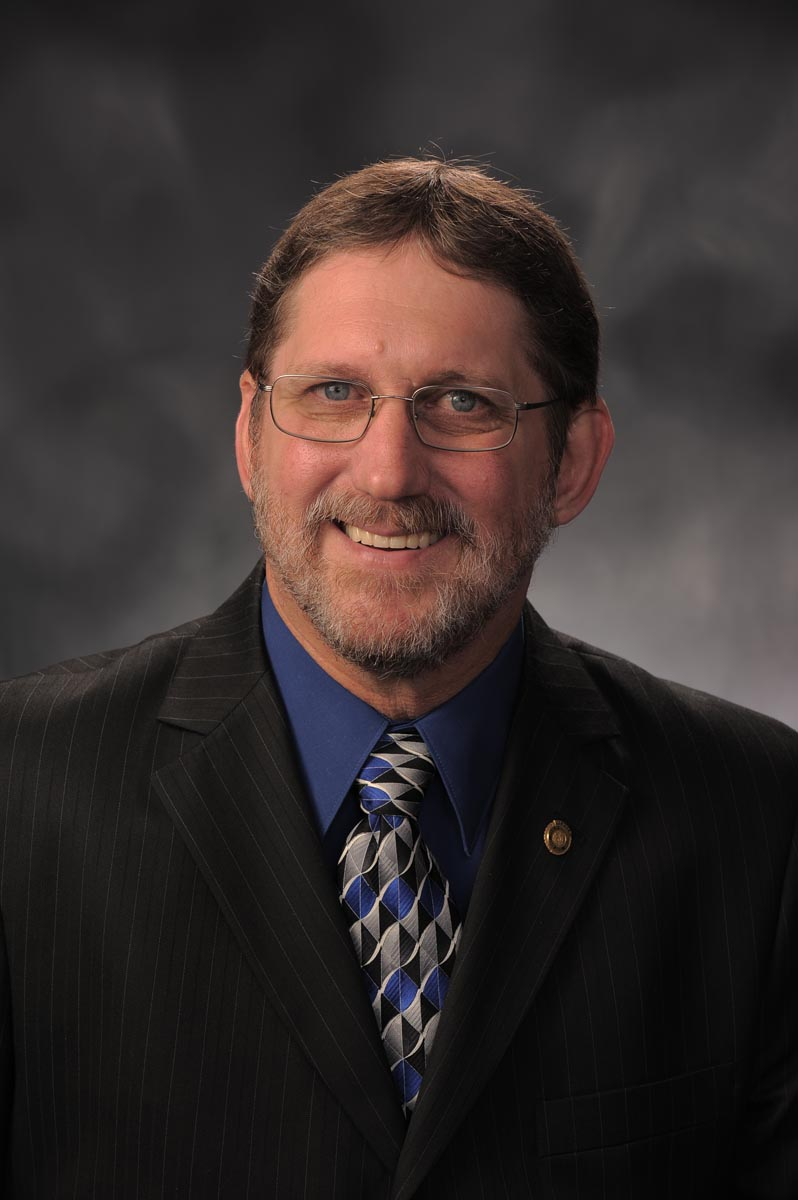
State Rep. David A. Day, 148th Dist. of Missouri

Day is also a member of the Southern Growth Policies Board, a non-partisan think tank that is made up of governors, legislators, business, and academic leaders from 13 states. The group focuses on improving the economy though innovation and technology, globalization and enhancing working environments. Most recently, Representative Day was appointed to the Missouri Sentencing Advisory Commission. The purpose of the commission is to support public safety, fairness and effectiveness in criminal sentencing.

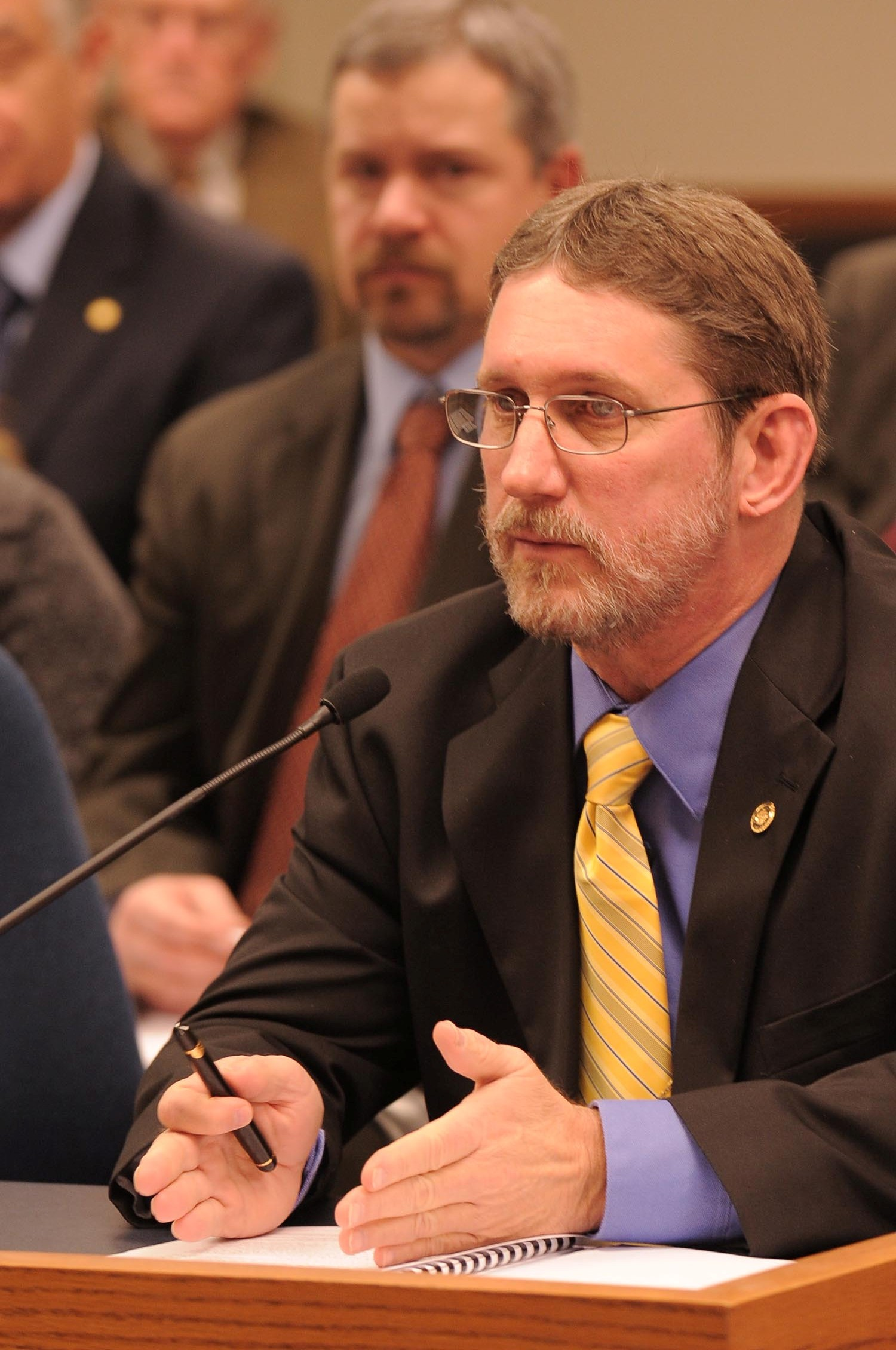
Rep. Day presenting legislation to a House Committee

In addition to his legislative duties, Rep. Day served 13 years on the Missouri Farm Bureau board of directors and is a member of the Pulaski County Farm Bureau, the Pulaski County Landowners Association, Waynesville Masonic Lodge No. 375 AF & AM, the American Legion - Post 298, Missouri Music Assoc. & Hall of Fame, and an active member of the Pisgah Baptist Church in Dixon.

Day has also served as a commissioner for the Missouri Hazardous Waste Management Commission, member of the Governor's Advisory Committee on Chips Mills, member of the Agriculture Advisory Committees for Senators Ashcroft, Talent and Bond and Congressman Skelton; member of the Missouri Department of Conservation's Landowners Stream Advisory Committee; board of directors of the Pulaski Landowners Association and as a member of the Speaker's Agriculture Task Force for former speaker of the Missouri House Catherine Hanaway. Rep. Day is also a past member of the Missouri Military Preparedness and Enhancement Commission.

Day served in the United States Army 1st and 13th Field Artillery from 1981 to 1984 in Fort Stewart, Georgia. Day is a lifelong resident of Pulaski County.

== Awards and recognition ==
2005: Elected vice-president of his freshman legislative class, Voted “Freshman Legislator of the Year” by his fellow legislators, Voted “Best Politician” by citizens of Pulaski County

2006: Received the Friend of Agriculture Award from MO Farm Bureau, Received the 100% for Jobs Award from the MO Chamber of Commerce, Voted “Best Politician” by citizens of Pulaski County (2nd year), Received Appreciation Award from MG Castro of Ft. Leonard Wood, 100% Voting Record with National Federation of Independent Business (NFIB)

2007: Named Legislator of the Year by the Veterans of Foreign War (VFW), Named Legislator of the Year by the American Legion, Certificate of Appreciation from the MO Association of Veteran's Organizations, Received special recognition from the MO Sheriff's Association, Award for support of the University of Missouri, Rolla (UMR), Voted “Best Politician” by citizens of Pulaski County (3rd year)

2008: Named Legislator of the Year by the Veterans of Foreign Wars (VFW), Certificate of Appreciation from the Under Secretary of Defense for passage of HB 1678, 100% Voting Record with National Federation of Independent Business (NFIB)

2009: Legislator Appreciation Award from the Pulaski County DAV, Presented the Colors of the Multi-National Task Force East and a Missouri Flag flown in his honor in Kosovo by BG Larry Kay in appreciation for Rep. Day's support of the military, Voted "Best Politician" by citizens of Pulaski County (4th time)

2010: Named Citizen of the Year by the Dixon Chamber of Commerce, 100% Voting Record with National Federation of Independent Business (NFIB), Received the Friend of Agriculture Award from MO Farm Bureau

2011: Named Legislator of the Year by the Missouri Assoc. of Veterans Organizations (MAVO), Named Legislator of the Year by the Missouri Forest Products Assoc.

2013: Received the Missouri Assoc. of Veterans Organizations (MAVO) Lifetime Achievement Award.

== Personal ==
He currently lives in Dixon, Missouri with his wife, Leasa. They have a daughter, Savanna.
