= Uranus, Missouri =

Tourist attraction in Missouri, US

Coordinates: 37°49′45″N 92°06′19″W

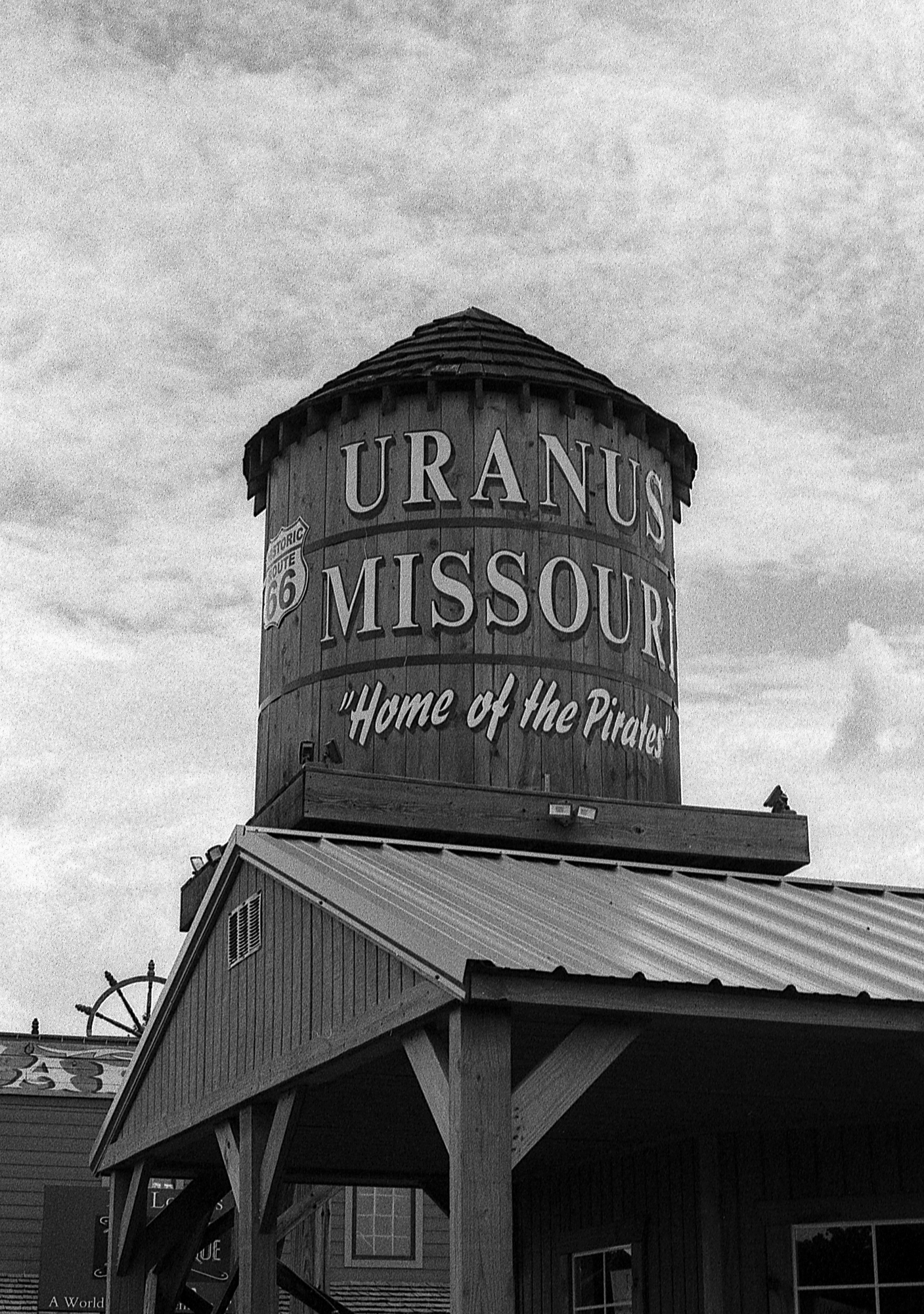
Uranus, Missouri water tower

Uranus is a tourist attraction in an unincorporated part of Pulaski County, Missouri, United States. It is situated on U.S. Route 66. All businesses are owned by Louie Keen, who calls himself the "Mayor of Uranus".

Uranus once held the Guinness World Records title for largest belt buckle.

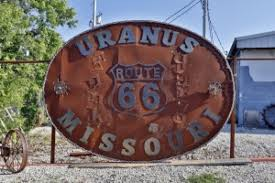
The largest belt buckle in the world
