= Swedeborg, Missouri =

Swedeborg
- Unincorporated community
- Swedeborg in October 2026

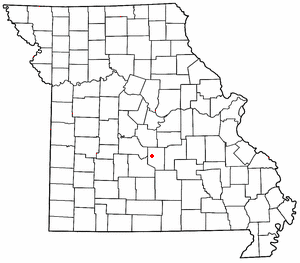
- Coordinates: 37°54′50″N 92°19′55″W
- Country: United States
- State: Missouri
- County: Pulaski
- Elevation: 1,119 ft (341 m)
- GNIS feature ID: 727372

Swedeborg is an unincorporated community in northwestern Pulaski County, Missouri, United States. It is located approximately five miles northeast of Richland on Route 133.

== History ==
Swedeborg was platted in 1878, and named for the fact a large share of the first settlers were Swedish. A post office called Swedeborg has been in operation since 1881.

== Education ==
Swedeborg is best known in Pulaski County for being the home of the Swedeborg R-III School District, which is the county's last remaining K-8 district. Along with Laquey, it is one of only two unincorporated communities in Pulaski County to retain its own school district.

== Transportation ==
Major north-south routes near Swedeborg include:

- Route 133 runs north from Interstate 44, exit 145, approximately two miles east of Hazelgreen to Richland, Swedeborg, Crocker, and about two miles west of Dixon, then north out of the county.
- Route 17 crosses Interstate 44 at exit 153 at Buckhorn, runs east through Waynesville, turns north to Crocker, and then runs north out of the county to Iberia.
- Missouri Highway T runs north from Highway 17 at Waynesville to Swedeborg, where it meets and ends at Highway 133, about halfway between Richland and Crocker.
