= Gascozark, Missouri =

Unincorporated community in Missouri, U.S.

Coordinates: 37°46′03″N 92°24′15″W

Gascozark is an unincorporated community in western Pulaski County, Missouri, United States. The town site is on Missouri Supplemental Route AB (formerly U.S. Highway 66).

The community's name is a portmanteau of the Gasconade River, west of the location and Ozarks, the surrounding area.
