= Palace, Missouri =

Unincorporated community in Missouri, U.S.

Coordinates: 37°37′13″N 92°08′24″W

Palace is an unincorporated community in southern Pulaski County, in the U.S. state of Missouri. The community is located on Missouri Route AW, just southeast of the Fort Leonard Wood boundary. The community of Evening Shade lies approximately three miles south on Route AW in Texas County.

== History ==
A post office called Palace was established in 1909, and remained in operation until 1957. The community was so named on account of its schoolhouse, a fine structure which locals deemed a "palace". The old Palace School is now defunct.
