= Waynesville School District =

School district in Missouri, U.S.

Coordinates: 37°49′09″N 92°13′08″W

The Waynesville R-VI Reorganized School District (also known as the Waynesville R-VI School District) is a school district in the Missouri Ozarks and the largest school district in Pulaski County. The school district current provides education services to the communities of Fort Leonard Wood, St. Robert, and almost all of Waynesville.

== Enrollment ==
5360 students attended the Waynesville R-VI School District during the 2007 - 2008 school year. Of these, 1552 were high school students, 856 were middle school students, and 2962 were elementary students. Additionally, the district employed 445 certified educational faculty members in addition to another 500+ service and support staff.

== Student demographics ==
As of the 2007 Missouri Department of Elementary and Secondary Education demographic report, the racial makeup of the school was 59.00% White, 28.00% Black, 9.00% Hispanic, 3.90% Asian, and 0.70% Indian. Additionally, 47.4% of the district's students qualified for a free or reduced lunch program.

== Educational faculty demographics ==
In 2007, 97.4% of the district teachers held regular teaching certificates, 2.0% held temporary or special assignment certificates, and 0.5% of the staff held substitute, expired, or no certificates. The Missouri DESE states that 99.4% of all the classes in the Waynesville RVI School District are taught by a highly qualified teacher. In comparison, the Missouri average for classes taught by highly qualified teachers is 96.8%. Additionally, 53.90% of all district teachers possess a master's degree or higher, compared with the state average of 50.6%.

The average teacher salary for a regular term is $42,891, compared to the Missouri average of $41,750. When additional extended contract salaries, Career Ladder, and extra duty pay is considered, the average teacher salary in the district is $42,676, compared to the Missouri average of $43,524. The average administrator salary for the district is $87,298, compared to the state average of $77,644.

== Schools populations ==
In total, the Waynesville R-VI School District operates 9 full-time educational facilities. Waynesville High School, the districts high school, contains a student body of 1709 in grades 9–12. The high school also feeds students into the Waynesville Career Center, a trade school for students grades 9–12, with a population of 250. The district's middle-level education for grades 7 and 8 is provided by Waynesville Middle School, population 869, while grade 6 is provided by Waynesville Sixth Grade Center, population 451. Primary level education is completed at one of 6 elementary schools: East Elementary (pop. 844), Freedom Elementary (pop. 1085), Partridge Elementary (pop. 273), Thayer Elementary (pop. 215) or Wood Elementary.(pop. 279).

All students in the Waynesville R-VI School District attend grades 7–8 at Waynesville Middle School and grades 9–12 at Waynesville High School. Additionally, High School students from Waynesville, and the surrounding towns of Crocker, Dixon, Laquey, and Richland, may (optionally) attend Waynesville Career Center (formally known as Waynesville Technical Academy). The WCC is housed in its own building (new in 2010) and offers programs such as Video Production, Certified Nursing Assistant classes, Auto Tech, Auto Body, Graphic Design, Computer Technology, Heating and Air conditioning, Cosmetology, and Marketing which students may attend for up to three hours a day and are given the opportunity to learn and work in a field that they could use as a career after high school. The WCC also houses the JROTC classes for Waynesville High, but these are not part of the WCC curriculum. Students in the Waynesville area attend grades K-5 at East Elementary and students in the Saint Robert area at Freedom Elementary. Students on the Fort Leonard Wood Military Installation attend grades K-5 at one of the elementary schools located on the installation, this is determined by whichever school is closest to where on the base the family lives.

== Accreditation ==
As of 2010, the Waynesville RVI School District was Accredited with Distinction and A+ Accredited by the Missouri Department of Elementary and Secondary Education as well as being accredited by the North Central Association of Colleges and Schools.
