= Big Piney, Missouri =

Unincorporated community in Missouri, U.S.

Coordinates: 37°40′19″N 92°05′53″W

Big Piney is an unincorporated community in Pulaski County, Missouri, United States on the southeastern edge of Fort Leonard Wood and one mile west of a bend in the Big Piney River. The community is on Missouri Route TT four miles northeast of Palace. Licking is seventeen miles to the southeast. Its former K-8 school has closed; students attend the Plato R-V School District.

== History ==
A post office called Big Piney was established in 1881, and remained in operation until 1972. The community takes its name from the Big Piney River.

During the Civil War, companies of the 5th Missouri State Militia garrisoned in Big Piney.

On Thanksgiving, November 25, 1926, an F3 tornado damaged or destroyed every building in Big Piney, killing one person and injuring 30 others.
