= Dixon, Missouri =

- City
- Dixon in October 2026

- Location of Dixon, Missouri
- Coordinates: 37°59′43″N 92°05′44″W
- Country: United States
- State: Missouri
- County: Pulaski
- Founded: 1869
- Named for: Dixon, Illinois

Government
  - Mayor: Mike Null
  - City Clerk: Jessie Fleming
  - City Attorney: Jeff Thomas

Area
  - Total: 1.05 sq mi (2.71 km^{2})
  - Land: 1.05 sq mi (2.71 km^{2})
  - Water: 0 sq mi (0.00 km^{2})
- Elevation: 1,148 ft (350 m)

Population (2020)
  - Total: 1,232
  - Estimate (2023): 1,208
  - Density: 1,179.6/sq mi (455.43/km^{2})
- Demonym: Dixonite
- Time zone: UTC-6 (Central (CST))
  - Summer (DST): UTC-5 (CDT)
- ZIP code: 65459
- Area code: 573
- FIPS code: 29-19630
- GNIS feature ID: 2394539
- Website: dixonmo.gov

Dixon is a city in northern Pulaski County, Missouri, United States. As of the 2020 census, Dixon had a population of 1,232.

== History ==
Dixon was platted in 1869 at the time a railroad was extended through to the neighborhood and a post office bearing the name of the town has been in operation since that time. The community takes its name from Dixon, Illinois, the native home of a share of the railway builders.

== Geography ==
The city is in the northeast corner of Pulaski County and is one mile south of the Pulaski-Maries county line. The headwaters of the north flowing Maries River are located along the northwest edge of the community. Streams along the south and east sides of the city flow into the Gasconade River, which is approximately five miles to the southeast. The community is served by State highways 28 and 133.

According to the United States Census Bureau, the city has a total area of 1.01 square miles (2.62 km^{2}), all land.

== Demographics ==
Historical population
| Census | Pop. | Note | %± |
|---|---|---|---|
| 1890 | 404 | | — |
| 1900 | 500 | | 23.8% |
| 1910 | 715 | | 43.0% |
| 1920 | 810 | | 13.3% |
| 1930 | 721 | | −11.0% |
| 1940 | 741 | | 2.8% |
| 1950 | 988 | | 33.3% |
| 1960 | 1,473 | | 49.1% |
| 1970 | 1,387 | | −5.8% |
| 1980 | 1,402 | | 1.1% |
| 1990 | 1,585 | | 13.1% |
| 2000 | 1,570 | | −0.9% |
| 2010 | 1,549 | | −1.3% |
| 2020 | 1,232 | | −20.5% |
U.S. Decennial Census

=== 2010 census ===
As of the census of 2010, there were 1,549 people, 645 households, and 363 families living in the city. The population density was 1,533.7 inhabitants per square mile (592.2/km^{2}). There were 738 housing units at an average density of 730.7 per square mile (282.1/km^{2}). The racial makeup of the city was 94.5% White, 0.9% African American, 0.3% Native American, 0.6% Asian, 0.9% Pacific Islander, 0.5% from other races, and 2.3% from two or more races. Hispanic or Latino of any race were 4.7% of the population.

There were 645 households, of which 30.9% had children under the age of 18 living with them, 38.9% were married couples living together, 13.2% had a female householder with no husband present, 4.2% had a male householder with no wife present, and 43.7% were non-families. 38.4% of all households were made up of individuals, and 17% had someone living alone who was 65 years of age or older. The average household size was 2.33 and the average family size was 3.10.

The median age in the city was 38.3 years. 25.7% of residents were under the age of 18; 8% were between the ages of 18 and 24; 23.8% were from 25 to 44; 25.2% were from 45 to 64; and 17.2% were 65 years of age or older. The gender makeup of the city was 46.8% male and 53.2% female.

=== 2000 census ===
As of the census of 2000, there were 1,570 people, 667 households, and 414 families living in the city. The population density was 1,545.8 inhabitants per square mile (596.8/km^{2}). There were 751 housing units at an average density of 739.4 per square mile (285.5/km^{2}). The racial makeup of the city was 96.05% White, 0.06% African American, 0.57% Native American, 1.02% Asian, 0.45% Pacific Islander, 1.02% from other races, and 0.83% from two or more races. Hispanic or Latino of any race were 2.04% of the population.

There were 667 households, out of which 32.2% had children under the age of 18 living with them, 44.5% were married couples living together, 14.1% had a female householder with no husband present, and 37.8% were non-families. 33.6% of all households were made up of individuals, and 18.6% had someone living alone who was 65 years of age or older. The average household size was 2.28 and the average family size was 2.91.

In the city the population was spread out, with 25.4% under the age of 18, 8.5% from 18 to 24, 25.5% from 25 to 44, 18.5% from 45 to 64, and 22.2% who were 65 years of age or older. The median age was 38 years. For every 100 females there were 79.0 males. For every 100 females age 18 and over, there were 75.6 males.

The median income for a household in the city was $21,821, and the median income for a family was $28,693. Males had a median income of $21,667 versus $17,115 for females. The per capita income for the city was $12,405. About 21.3% of families and 23.5% of the population were below the poverty line, including 37.6% of those under age 18 and 12.9% of those age 65 or over.

== Transportation ==
Major north–south routes near Dixon include:

- Route 133 runs north from Interstate 44, exit 145, approximately two miles east of Hazelgreen to Richland, Swedeborg, Crocker, and about two miles west of Dixon, then north out of the county.
- Route 28 begins at Interstate 44, exit 163, east of St. Robert, runs north through Dixon, and then runs north out of the county.

== Education ==
Dixon R-I School District operates one elementary school, one middle school, and Dixon High School.

The town has a lending library, the Jessie E. Mccully Memorial Library.

== Notable people ==
- John Brown, former professional basketball player, attended Dixon High School
- David A. Day, Missouri State Representative, resides in Dixon. Day served in the Missouri House of Representatives from 2005 to 2012 and served as Chairman of the House Veterans Committee.
- Bill Hardwick, Missouri State Representative, resides in Dixon and attended Dixon High School. Hardwick is an Iraq War Veteran, attorney, Chairman of the Sustainable Ozarks Partnership.
