= Laquey, Missouri =

Unincorporated community in Missouri, U.S.

Coordinates: 37°46′13″N 92°18′13″W

- unincorporated
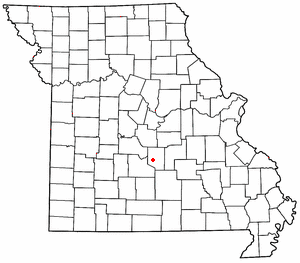
- Interactive map of Laquey, Missouri
- Country: Pulaski
- State: Missouri
- Postal code: 65534
- Area code: 573

Laquey (pronounced "Lake-way") is an unincorporated community in Pulaski County, Missouri, United States.

The community is on Missouri Route P approximately one mile south of I-44. It is about seven miles southwest of Waynesville and five miles west of the northwest corner of Fort Leonard Wood. The Laquey school is approximately one half mile southwest along Missouri Route A.

== History ==
A post office called Laquey has been in operation since 1899. The community was named for an area resident, Joseph John Alexander LaQuey. J.J.A. LaQuey was born in Kentucky in 1800, and settled in the Liberty Township area of Pulaski County. In 1875, J.J.A. was appointed the first Post Master of Bellefonte, in Liberty Township, near current day Laquey. During the Civil War, Company G. of the 8th Missouri State Militia Cavalry based their camp in the area. The nearby Old Wire Road, served as a main route between St. Louis, and Springfield. Company G. of the Missouri State Militia patrolled the road, and escorted wagon trains along the route.
