= St. Robert, Missouri =

City in Pulaski County, Missouri, United States

- City
- City of St. Robert
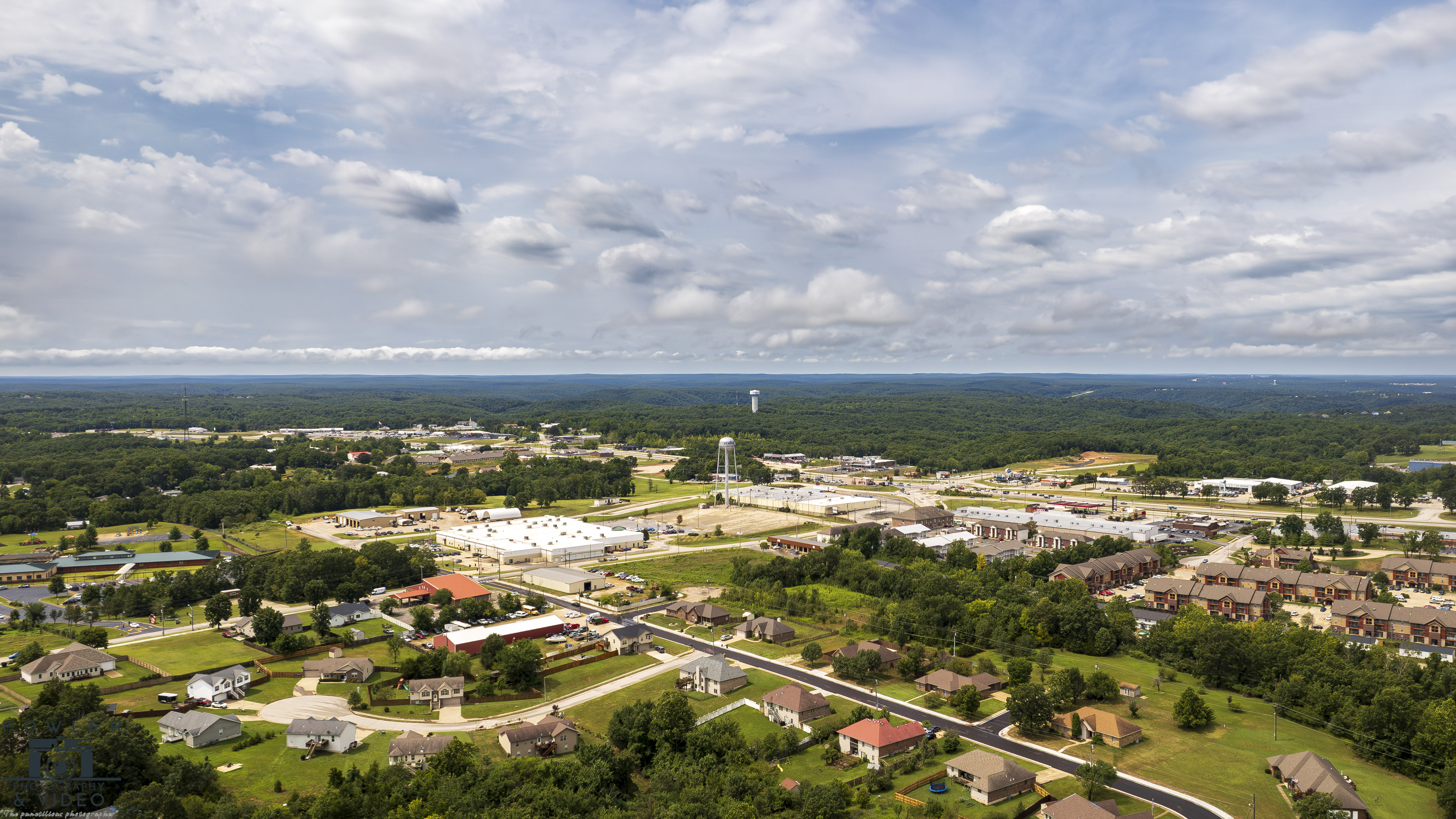

- Location of St. Robert, Missouri
- Coordinates: 37°49′28″N 92°09′11″W
- Country: United States
- State: Missouri
- County: Pulaski

Area
  - Total: 8.42 sq mi (21.82 km^{2})
  - Land: 8.42 sq mi (21.80 km^{2})
  - Water: 0.0077 sq mi (0.02 km^{2})
- Elevation: 1,076 ft (328 m)

Population (2020)
  - Total: 5,192
  - Estimate (2023): 5,457
  - Density: 616.8/sq mi (238.13/km^{2})
- Time zone: UTC-6 (Central (CST))
  - Summer (DST): UTC-5 (CDT)
- FIPS code: 29-65144
- GNIS feature ID: 2396519
- Website: City website

St. Robert or Saint Robert is a city in Pulaski County, Missouri, United States. The population was 5,192 at the 2020 census. It is a gateway community to the United States Army installation at Fort Leonard Wood.

== Geography ==
St. Robert is located at 37°49′28″N 92°8′1″W (37.824550, -92.133499).

According to the United States Census Bureau, the city has a total area of 7.84 square miles (20.31 km^{2}), of which 7.83 square miles (20.28 km^{2}) is land and 0.01 square miles (0.03 km^{2}) is water. Historic Route 66 runs through St. Robert.

== Demographics ==
Historical population
Census	Pop.	Note	%±
1960	860		—
1970	1,465		70.3%
1980	1,735		18.4%
1990	1,730		−0.3%
2000	2,760		59.5%
2010	4,340		57.2%
2020	5,192		19.6%
U.S. Decennial Census

=== 2020 census ===
As of the 2020 census, St. Robert had a population of 5,192. The median age was 30.3 years. 28.3% of residents were under the age of 18 and 7.6% of residents were 65 years of age or older. For every 100 females there were 100.9 males, and for every 100 females age 18 and over there were 96.8 males age 18 and over.

92.2% of residents lived in urban areas, while 7.8% lived in rural areas.

There were 2,141 households in St. Robert, of which 37.0% had children under the age of 18 living in them. Of all households, 43.6% were married-couple households, 24.4% were households with a male householder and no spouse or partner present, and 26.8% were households with a female householder and no spouse or partner present. About 32.8% of all households were made up of individuals and 6.0% had someone living alone who was 65 years of age or older.

There were 2,547 housing units, of which 15.9% were vacant. The homeowner vacancy rate was 3.7% and the rental vacancy rate was 15.1%.

Racial composition as of the 2020 census
Race	Number	Percent
White	2,981	57.4%
Black or African American	939	18.1%
American Indian and Alaska Native	52	1.0%
Asian	311	6.0%
Native Hawaiian and Other Pacific Islander	58	1.1%
Some other race	238	4.6%
Two or more races	613	11.8%
Hispanic or Latino (of any race)	631	12.2%

=== 2010 census ===
As of the census of 2010, there were 4,340 people, 1,827 households, and 1,080 families residing in the city. The population density was 554.3 inhabitants per square mile (214.0/km^{2}). There were 1,992 housing units at an average density of 254.4 per square mile (98.2/km^{2}). The racial makeup of the city was 61.1% White, 22.1% African American, 0.4% Native American, 5.8% Asian, 0.9% Pacific Islander, 3.1% from other races, and 6.7% from two or more races. Hispanic or Latino of any race were 11.0% of the population.

There were 1,827 households, of which 36.1% had children under the age of 18 living with them, 41.9% were married couples living together, 13.1% had a female householder with no husband present, 4.1% had a male householder with no wife present, and 40.9% were non-families. 35.2% of all households were made up of individuals, and 5.3% had someone living alone who was 65 years of age or older. The average household size was 2.36 and the average family size was 3.09.

The median age in the city was 30.1 years. 28% of residents were under the age of 18; 10.4% were between the ages of 18 and 24; 36.9% were from 25 to 44; 18.7% were from 45 to 64; and 6.1% were 65 years of age or older. The gender makeup of the city was 51.1% male and 48.9% female.

=== 2000 census ===
As of the census of 2000, there were 2,760 people, 1,219 households, and 688 families residing in the city. The population density was 383.0 inhabitants per square mile (147.9/km^{2}). There were 1,408 housing units at an average density of 195.4 per square mile (75.4/km^{2}). The racial makeup of the city was 64.64% White, 20.29% African American, 0.58% Native American, 5.43% Asian, 0.40% Pacific Islander, 2.90% from other races, and 5.76% from two or more races. Hispanic or Latino of any race were 6.12% of the population.

There were 1,219 households, out of which 31.3% had children under the age of 18 living with them, 39.7% were married couples living together, 12.1% had a female householder with no husband present, and 43.5% were non-families. 36.5% of all households were made up of individuals, and 6.0% had someone living alone who was 65 years of age or older. The average household size was 2.25 and the average family size was 2.98.

In the city, the population was spread out, with 26.6% under the age of 18, 7.8% from 18 to 24, 37.3% from 25 to 44, 20.0% from 45 to 64, and 8.0% who were 65 years of age or older. The median age was 33 years. For every 100 females, there were 99.7 males. For every 100 females age 18 and over, there were 101.5 males.

The median income for a household in the city was $33,080, and the median income for a family was $37,841. Males had a median income of $29,934 versus $20,625 for females. The per capita income for the city was $17,650. About 11.3% of families and 11.3% of the population were below the poverty line, including 15.0% of those under age 18 and 5.6% of those age 65 or over.

== Transportation ==
Waynesville Regional Airport at Forney Field serves the community with air service; although it is on Fort Leonard Wood, it is jointly run by the cities of Waynesville and St. Robert and is available for civilian use by private pilots and scheduled commercial passenger service.

The major east-west route is Interstate 44; before that, the main highway was U.S. Route 66, which still exists as a scenic route through the area and passes through Devil's Elbow, St. Robert, Waynesville, Buckhorn, and Hazelgreen. Names for U.S. Route 66 vary - at different places, it is called Teardrop Road, Highway Z, Old Route 66, Historic Route 66, and Highway 17. State-posted signs mark most of the alignment of the road.

Major north-south routes near St. Robert include:

- Route 28 which crosses Interstate 44 at exit 163 at the eastern edge of St. Robert, runs north through Dixon, and then runs north out of the county.
- A secondary road parallels Highway 28, beginning as Highway Y at exit 161 of Interstate 44 in St. Robert, running north to the Gasconade River bridge, where it becomes the county-maintained Cave Road and turning north as Highway O until it meets Missouri 28, a few miles south of Dixon.

== Politics ==
=== Local ===
St. Robert has a mayor and eight aldermen, each elected for two-year terms. The city has four wards with two aldermen elected from each ward in staggered terms so one alderman from each ward stands for election each year while the mayor is elected citywide. As with most other Missouri cities, elections are held in April.

Non-elected senior positions include Interim City Administrator Anita Ivey. Municipal Judge Tom Julian was re-elected in April 2009 to the position he had held for many years; the city council subsequently converted the municipal judge position to an appointed rather than an elected position and reappointed Julian to the position. Following Julian's death, Bill Hardwick, an assistant prosecuting attorney working under County Prosecutor Kevin Hillman, a former St. Robert city attorney, was appointed to fill the position. Bill Hardwick vacated position, Ernest W. Tanner now fills this position.

Hillman and former Ward II Alderman Gene Newkirk both left city government following the results of the August 2010 elections. Hillman was elected as the Pulaski County Prosecuting Attorney; Newkirk was elected the Pulaski County Presiding Commissioner.

The following chart reflects the city's elected officials following the April 2014 municipal election in which incumbent Larry Jackson was defeated by challenger Theresa Cook, herself a former alderman who was defeated for re-election several years earlier. Reggie Hall was appointed to fill a vacancy caused by the resignation of Butchy Newkirk and George Lauritson, himself a former mayor, ran unopposed for a seat when Freda Hunnicutt decided not to run for re-election. The positions remained unchanged in the 2013 municipal election from those who had been elected in 2014.

Office	2012-13	2014	2017-2018	2019	2022	2023
Mayor	George Sanders	George Sanders	George Lauritson	George Lauritson	George Lauritson	George Lauritson
Ward I	Larry Jackson	Theresa Cook	Theresa Cook	Theresa Cook	Glen Askeland	Glen Askeland
Ward I	James Phillips	James Phillips	Charles Slider	Susan Davidson	Charles Slider	Susan Davidson
Ward II	Linda Daniels	Linda Daniels	Linda Daniels	Linda Daniels	Linda Daniels	Linda Daniels
Ward II	Sylvia "Butchy" Newkirk	Reggie Hall	Reggie Hall	Reggie Hall	Reggie Hall	Reggie Hall
Ward III	Todd Williams	Todd Williams	Todd Williams	Todd Williams	Todd Williams	Todd Williams
Ward III	Allan Johannsen	Allan Johannsen	Allan Johannsen	Walter Reese	Walter Reese	Walter Reese
Ward IV	Bill Shaw	Bill Shaw	Michael Myers	Michael Myers	Michael Myers	Michael Myers
Ward IV	Freda Hunnicutt	George Lauritson	John Moore	John Moore	John Moore	John Moore

== Media ==
Pulaski County historically had one daily and three weekly print newspapers, as well as an online internet daily newspaper. All but the weekly Dixon Pilot and the online Pulaski County Daily News are now closed. The county also has an internet discussion site, the Pulaski County Insider.

KFBD-FM and its AM sister station, KJPW, are the dominant news radio providers in the Pulaski County area, which includes Fort Leonard Wood, Waynesville, and St. Robert. These stations compete with the only other station broadcasting from Pulaski County, KFLW Radio.

The Daily Guide, commonly known as the Waynesville Daily Guide, but based in St. Robert and serving the entire county, closed in September 2018. It was owned by GateHouse Media and was the central printing plant for three other GateHouse newspapers in nearby counties, the daily Camden Lake Sun Leader and Rolla Daily News as well as the weekly St. James Leader-Journal. The Rolla Daily News and the St. James weekly have since closed as well.

The content of the now-closed weekly Fort Leonard Wood Guidon was previously produced under the auspices of Army Public Affairs at Fort Leonard Wood but printed under contract by the Springfield News-Leader, a Gannett-owned newspaper which produced and sold advertisements in the Fort Leonard Wood Guidon. The military contract to produce the Guidon was held by the Lebanon Daily Record until the end of 2002, and before the Lebanon Daily Record had been held by the Waynesville Daily Guide for many years.

The weekly Pulaski County Mirror closed in February 2017 and had been owned by the Lebanon Daily Record, a family owned newspaper in an adjoining county. The paper is a merger of the Richland Mirror and Pulaski County Democrat in St. Robert, which were separate weekly papers owned by the Lebanon Daily Record until their owner merged them in 2009.

The Pulaski County Daily News internet newspaper is privately owned by a Waynesville resident.

The Pulaski County Insider is run and maintained by a businessman from St. Robert and hosted by a Potosi resident.

The other weekly paper in Pulaski County, the Dixon Pilot, does not routinely cover St. Robert.

== Education ==
St. Robert residents attend the Waynesville R-VI School District.

== See also ==
- List of cities in Missouri
