= Pulaski County, Missouri =

County in Missouri, United States

- County
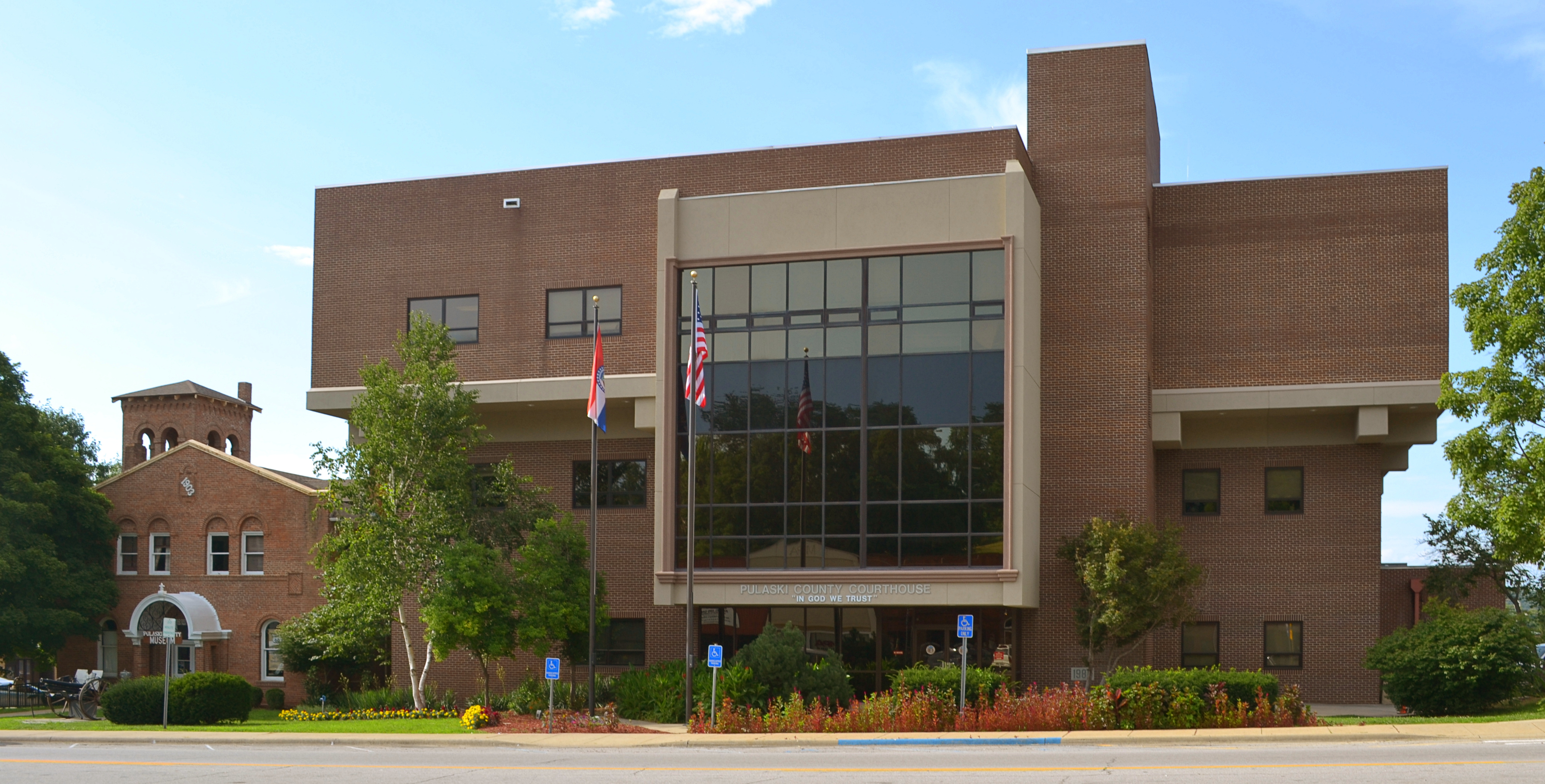
- Old and new Pulaski County courthouses in Waynesville

- Location within the U.S. state of Missouri
- Coordinates: 37°49′N 92°13′W
- Country: United States
- State: Missouri
- Founded: January 19, 1833
- Named for: Kazimierz Pułaski
- Seat: Waynesville
- Largest community: Fort Leonard Wood

Area
  - Total: 551 sq mi (1,430 km^{2})
  - Land: 547 sq mi (1,420 km^{2})
  - Water: 4.4 sq mi (11 km^{2}) 0.8%

Population (2020)
  - Total: 53,955
  - Estimate (2025): 54,442 ▲
  - Density: 98/sq mi (38/km^{2})
- Time zone: UTC−6 (Central)
  - Summer (DST): UTC−5 (CDT)
- Congressional district: 4th
- Website: www.pulaskicountymo.org/home.html

Pulaski County is a county located in the U.S. state of Missouri. As of the 2020 census, the population was 53,955. Its county seat is Waynesville. The county was organized in 1833 and named for Kazimierz Pułaski, a Polish patriot who died fighting in the American Revolution. Pulaski County is the site of Fort Leonard Wood, a U.S. Army training base. It comprises the Fort Leonard Wood, MO Micropolitan Statistical Area which has nearly one-third of the total county population.

== History ==
Pulaski County's earliest settlers were the Quapaw, Missouria and Osage Native Americans. After the Lewis and Clark Expedition of the early 19th century, white settlers came to the area, many from Kentucky, Tennessee and the Carolinas; the earliest pioneers appeared to have settled as early as 1818, and the town of Waynesville was designated the county seat by the Missouri Legislature in 1833. Like the county, Waynesville is also named after an American Revolutionary hero, Mad Anthony Wayne.

== Geography ==
According to the U.S. Census Bureau, the county has a total area of 551 square miles (1,430 km^{2}), of which 547 square miles (1,420 km^{2}) is land and 4.4 square miles (11 km^{2}) (0.8%) is water.

=== Adjacent counties ===
- Miller County (northwest)
- Maries County (northeast)
- Phelps County (east)
- Texas County (south)
- Laclede County (southwest)
- Camden County (west)

=== National protected area ===
- Mark Twain National Forest (part)

== Demographics ==
Historical population
Census	Pop.	Note	%±
1840	6,529		—
1850	3,998		−38.8%
1860	3,835		−4.1%
1870	4,714		22.9%
1880	7,250		53.8%
1890	9,387		29.5%
1900	10,394		10.7%
1910	11,438		10.0%
1920	10,490		−8.3%
1930	10,755		2.5%
1940	10,775		0.2%
1950	10,392		−3.6%
1960	46,567		348.1%
1970	53,781		15.5%
1980	42,011		−21.9%
1990	41,307		−1.7%
2000	41,165		−0.3%
2010	52,274		27.0%
2020	53,955		3.2%
2025 (est.)	54,442	▲	0.9%
U.S. Decennial Census; 1790-1960 1900-1990; 1990-2000 2010

=== 2020 census ===
As of the 2020 census, the county had a population of 53,955, and the median age was 27.3 years. 22.6% of residents were under the age of 18 and 9.2% of residents were 65 years of age or older. For every 100 females there were 134.2 males, and for every 100 females age 18 and over there were 144.4 males age 18 and over.

The racial makeup of the county was 71.5% White, 11.7% Black or African American, 0.8% American Indian and Alaska Native, 3.4% Asian, 0.8% Native Hawaiian and Pacific Islander, 2.6% from some other race, and 9.2% from two or more races; Hispanic or Latino residents of any race comprised 11.3% of the population. The redistricting data table below details the non-Hispanic counts for each race.

58.7% of residents lived in urban areas, while 41.3% lived in rural areas.

There were 16,902 households in the county, of which 36.1% had children under the age of 18 living with them and 23.0% had a female householder with no spouse or partner present. About 27.9% of all households were made up of individuals and 7.8% had someone living alone who was 65 years of age or older.

There were 19,315 housing units, of which 12.5% were vacant. Among occupied housing units, 53.5% were owner-occupied and 46.5% were renter-occupied. The homeowner vacancy rate was 2.8% and the rental vacancy rate was 9.9%.

Pulaski County, Missouri – Racial and ethnic composition Note: the US Census treats Hispanic/Latino as an ethnic category. This table excludes Latinos from the racial categories and assigns them to a separate category. Hispanics/Latinos may be of any race.
Race / Ethnicity (NH = Non-Hispanic)	Pop 1980	Pop 1990	Pop 2000	Pop 2010	Pop 2020	% 1980	% 1990	% 2000	% 2010	% 2020
White alone (NH)	34,459	32,377	31,200	37,863	35,865	82.02%	78.38%	75.79%	72.43%	66.47%
Black or African American alone (NH)	4,579	5,493	4,858	5,680	6,039	10.90%	13.30%	11.80%	10.87%	11.19%
Native American or Alaska Native alone (NH)	306	251	377	352	334	0.73%	0.61%	0.92%	0.67%	0.62%
Asian alone (NH)	851	1,144	920	1,295	1,776	2.03%	2.77%	2.23%	2.48%	3.29%
Native Hawaiian or Pacific Islander alone (NH)	x	x	129	292	402	x	x	0.31%	0.56%	0.75%
Other race alone (NH)	97	89	136	75	220	0.23%	0.22%	0.33%	0.14%	0.41%
Mixed race or Multiracial (NH)	x	x	1,141	2,012	3,240	x	x	2.77%	3.85%	6.01%
Hispanic or Latino (any race)	1,719	1,953	2,404	4,705	6,079	4.09%	4.73%	5.84%	9.00%	11.27%
Total	42,011	41,307	41,165	52,274	53,955	100.00%	100.00%	100.00%	100.00%	100.00%

=== 2000 census ===
As of the 2000 census, there were 41,165 people, 13,433 households, and 9,953 families residing in the county. The population density was 75 people per square mile (29 people/km^{2}). There were 15,408 housing units at an average density of 28 units per square mile (11/km^{2}). The racial makeup of the county was 78.35% White, 11.99% Black or African American, 1.00% Native American, 2.27% Asian, 0.32% Pacific Islander, 2.50% from other races, and 3.57% from two or more races. Approximately 5.84% of the population were Hispanic or Latino of any race.

There were 13,433 households, out of which 42.30% had children under the age of 18 living with them, 60.60% were married couples living together, 9.70% had a female householder with no husband present, and 25.90% were non-families. 21.60% of all households were made up of individuals, and 7.20% had someone living alone who was 65 years of age or older. The average household size was 2.68 and the average family size was 3.13.

In the county, the population was spread out, with 27.50% under the age of 18, 16.60% from 18 to 24, 32.00% from 25 to 44, 15.90% from 45 to 64, and 7.90% who were 65 years of age or older. The median age was 28 years. For every 100 females there were 112.10 males. For every 100 females age 18 and over, there were 115.40 males.

The median income for a household in the county was $34,247, and the median income for a family was $37,786. Males had a median income of $26,553 versus $20,500 for females. The per capita income for the county was $14,586. About 8.00% of families and 10.30% of the population were below the poverty line, including 12.40% of those under age 18 and 12.30% of those age 65 or over.

== Transportation ==
=== Airport ===
Waynesville Regional Airport at Forney Field serves the community with air service; even though it's on Fort Leonard Wood, it is jointly run by the cities of Waynesville and St. Robert and is available for civilian use by private pilots and scheduled commercial passenger service. The City of Richland also has an "Unmanned" Airport that consists of a 3000 ft runway.

=== Major highways ===
- I-44
- Route 7
- Route 17
- Route 28
- Route 133

== Media ==
KFBD-FM and its AM sister station, KJPW, are the dominant news radio providers in the Pulaski County area, which includes Fort Leonard Wood, Waynesville, and St. Robert. These stations compete with the only other station broadcasting from Pulaski County, KFLW Radio, previously owned by the Lebanon Daily Record and working locally from the St. Robert offices of the now-closed Pulaski County Mirror, the weekly newspaper.

- The weekly Dixon Pilot is privately owned by a former Dixon resident who now lives in Rolla.
- The Pulaski County Daily News internet newspaper is privately owned by a Waynesville resident.
- Allen Hilliard Sports internet sports website is privately owned by a St Robert resident.

Pulaski County historically had one daily and three weekly print newspapers, as well as an online internet daily newspaper. All but the weekly Dixon Pilot and the online Pulaski County Daily News are now closed. The county also has an internet discussion site, the Pulaski County Insider.

The Daily Guide, commonly known as the Waynesville Daily Guide, but based in St. Robert and serving the entire county, closed in September 2018. It was owned by GateHouse Media and was the central printing plant for three other GateHouse newspapers in nearby counties, the daily Camden Lake Sun Leader and Rolla Daily News as well as the weekly St. James Leader-Journal. The Rolla Daily News and the St. James weekly have since closed as well.

The content of the now-closed weekly Fort Leonard Wood Guidon was previously produced under the auspices of Army Public Affairs at Fort Leonard Wood but printed under contract by the Springfield News-Leader, a Gannett-owned newspaper which produced and sold advertisements in the Fort Leonard Wood Guidon. The military contract to produce the Guidon was held by the Lebanon Daily Record until the end of 2002, and before the Lebanon Daily Record had been held by the Waynesville Daily Guide for many years.

The weekly Pulaski County Mirror closed in February 2017 and had been owned by the Lebanon Daily Record, a family owned newspaper in an adjoining county. The paper is a merger of the Richland Mirror and Pulaski County Democrat in St. Robert, which were separate weekly papers owned by the Lebanon Daily Record until their owner merged them in 2009.

== Education ==
School districts include:

K-12:

- Crocker R-II School District
- Dixon R-I School District
- Laquey R-V School District
- Newburg R-II School District
- Plato R-V School District
- Richland R-IV School District
- Waynesville R-VI Schools

Elementary only:

- Gasconade C-4 School District
- Phelps County R-III School District
- Swedeborg R-III School District

=== School district details ===
Fort Leonard Wood is in Pulaski County and a high percentage of military personnel live off post in surrounding communities, especially St. Robert and Waynesville but also the farther-out cities of Richland, Crocker, and Dixon, and the unincorporated communities of Laquey, Swedeborg and Devil's Elbow, all of which have a lower housing cost than nearer housing in St. Robert and Waynesville. Military personnel assigned to training areas on the south end of the post sometimes choose to live in the unincorporated areas of Big Piney and Palace in Pulaski County, or the northern Texas County communities of Plato and Roby.

Seven main school districts are fully or partly within the borders of Pulaski County, not counting two small districts which are mostly within other counties and only have only a few dozen residents within Pulaski County. All seven school districts have a high percentage of Fort Leonard Wood military dependents, and over two-thirds of Waynesville students fall into that category.

The cities of Waynesville and St. Robert and the Fort Leonard Wood army installation, along with their surrounding rural areas running east to Devil's Elbow, are served by the Waynesville R-VI School District which is by far the largest in the county.

The cities of Richland, Crocker, and Dixon, along with their surrounding rural areas, are served by the Richland R-IV School District, the Crocker R-II School District and the Dixon R-I School District. The Richland and Dixon districts both extend into rural parts of adjacent counties.

The unincorporated communities of Laquey and Swedeborg are served by the Laquey R-V School District and the Swedeborg R-III School District. Swedeborg is the county's last remaining K-8 district and most of its high school students attend Richland High School though some attend Crocker High School or Waynesville High School; all other districts serve students running from kindergarten through high school.

The areas south of Fort Leonard Wood, including the unincorporated Pulaski County communities of Big Piney and Palace, is served by the Plato R-V School District, which is based in the northern Texas County village of Plato but also includes parts of Pulaski, Laclede and Wright counties.

=== Public schools ===
- Crocker R-II School District – Crocker
  - Crocker Elementary School (PK-06)
  - Crocker High School (07-12)
- Dixon R-I School District – Dixon
  - Dixon Elementary School (PK-05)
  - Dixon Middle School (06-08)
  - Dixon High School (09-12)
- Laquey R-V School District – Laquey
  - Laquey Elementary School (PK-05)
  - Laquey Middle School (06-08)
  - Laquey High School (09-12)
- Swedeborg R-VIII School District – Swedeborg
  - Swedeborg Elementary School (PK-08)
- Richland R-IV School District – Richland
  - Richland Elementary School (K-06)
  - Richland Junior High School (07-08)
  - Richland High School (09-12)
- Waynesville R-VI School District – Waynesville
  - Williams Early Childhood Center (PK) – Ft. Leonard Wood
  - East Elementary School (K-05) - Waynesville
  - Freedom Elementary School (K-05) – St. Robert
  - Partridge Elementary School (K-05) – Ft. Leonard Wood
  - Thayer Elementary School (K-05) – Ft. Leonard Wood
  - Wood Elementary School (K-05) – Ft. Leonard Wood
  - Waynesville Sixth Grade Center (06) — Waynesville
  - Waynesville Middle School (07-08) — Waynesville
  - Waynesville High School (09-12) — Waynesville

=== Private schools ===
- Maranatha Baptist Academy – St. Robert (K4-12) – Baptist
- Westside Christian Academy – Waynesville (K4-12) – Baptist

=== Public libraries ===
- Pulaski County Library

== Communities ==
=== Cities ===
- Crocker
- Dixon
- Richland (small parts in Camden and Laclede counties)
- St. Robert
- Waynesville (county seat)

=== Census-designated place ===
- Fort Leonard Wood

=== Unincorporated places ===
- Big Piney
- Buckhorn
- Cookville
- Devils Elbow
- Franks
- Gascozark
- Hancock
- Hawkeye
- Helm
- Hooker
- Laquey
- Palace
- St. John
- Shady Grove
- Swedeborg
- Uranus

== Notable people ==
- Bill Hardwick, Missouri State Representative, Hardwick is an Iraq War Veteran, attorney, and Chairman of the Sustainable Ozarks Partnership.

== Politics ==
=== Local ===
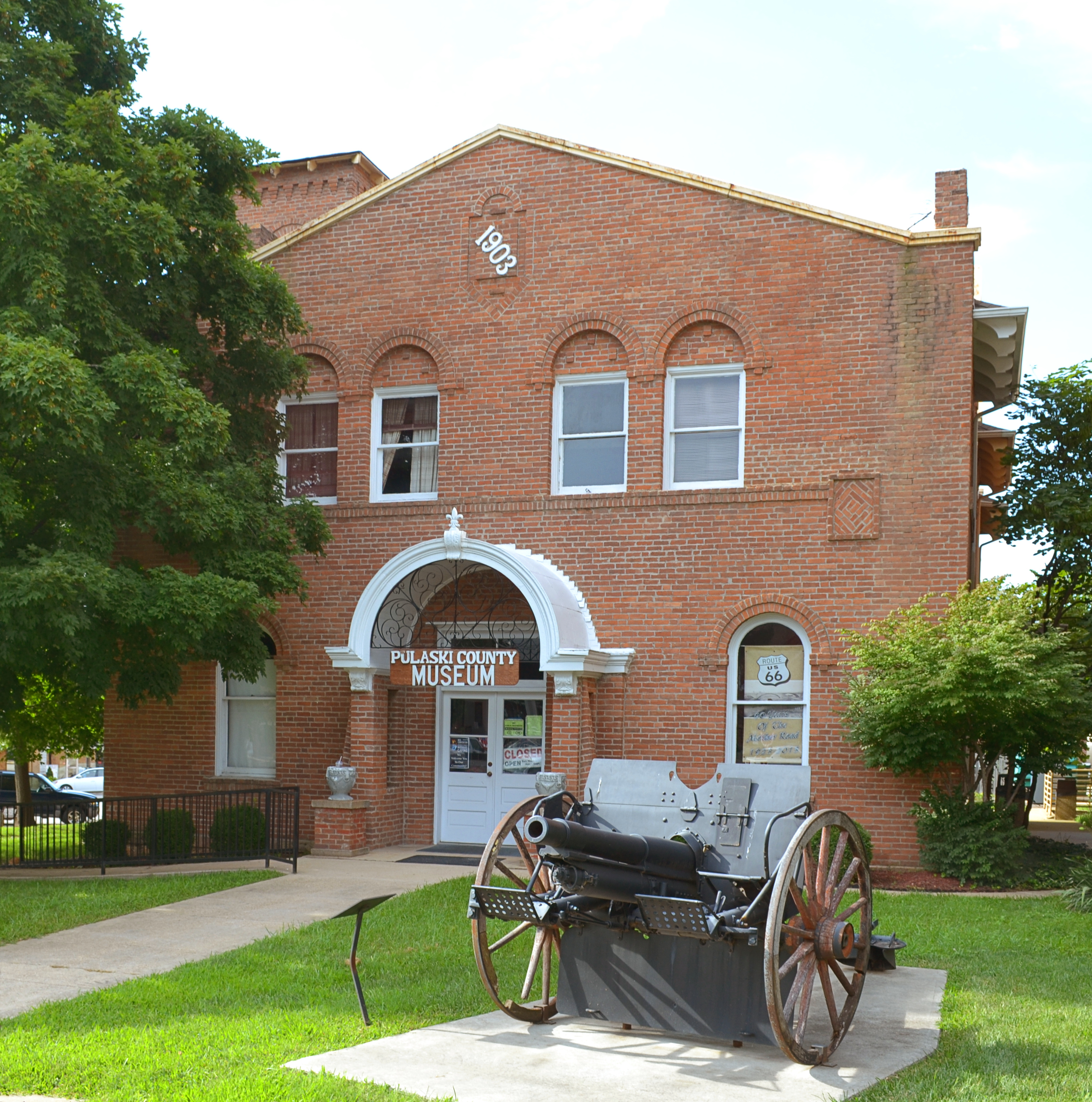
The old Pulaski County Courthouse, which is on the National Register, is now a museum.

Politics at the local level in Pulaski County were traditionally dominated by the Democratic Party, but Republican Party candidates have become increasingly viable in the years since 2002, when the first large-scale victories of Republican candidates began. That's generally attributed to the increasing number of military personnel who retire in the area and switch their voter registration to Pulaski County.

In 2002, Republicans Diana Linnenbringer, Dennis Thornsberry and Barbara Shackelford (now Barbara Thomas) were elected to the offices of county clerk, western district county commissioner, and county treasurer, defeating Democrats in those offices.

The trend continued in 2004 when Republican Bill Farnham defeated the Democratic incumbent, Eastern District County Commissioner Gary Carmack, and Republicans Don Mayhew and Loretta Rouse defeated two long-term Democratic incumbents, County Surveyor John Mackey and County Public Administrator Paula Long Weber. In state offices, Democratic State Rep. Bill Ransdall, who was term-limited and could not run for re-election, was replaced by Republican David Day who defeated the Democratic candidate, Clara Ichord, in what turned out to be a landslide victory for Day.

In 2006, the incumbent Democratic Presiding Commissioner, Tony Crismon, switched parties but was defeated in the Republican primary by Tim Berrier, who was subsequently defeated in the general election by Bill Ransdall. That year also saw a switch in party affiliation in the collector's office, where the longtime Democratic incumbent retired and was replaced by Republican Terri Mitchell, whose husband, Jim Mitchell, had preceded Ransdall in Pulaski County's state house seat. Kyle Bomar of Crocker challenged David Day, Day was reelected to the Missouri House with over 65% of the vote.

The 2008 Democratic victories nationally had minimal effect on Pulaski County party affiliations, with retiring Republican Western District County Commissioner Dennis Thornsberry being replaced by another Republican, Ricky Zweerink; the only party affiliation switch was in the county surveyor's office where Mackey recovered his seat for the Democrats after defeating Mayhew. David Day was unopposed.

Two resignations occurred in 2009; County Treasurer Barbara Thomas resigned and Presiding Commissioner Bill Ransdall accepted an appointment by Gov. Jay Nixon to the Missouri State Tax Commission, which required him to resign county offices and numerous other positions. Nixon appointed Democrat Morris Roam to fill Thomas' Republican seat and appointed Democrat Don McCulloch, the retired Waynesville Police Chief, to fill Ransdall's seat.

In the 2010 elections, Roam chose not to run and was replaced by Republican Sue Rapone, who defeated the Democratic nominee, Ted Helms. Rep. David Day was again unopposed and entered his last term in the Missouri House of Representatives due to term limits. McCulloch was defeated by St. Robert Alderman Gene Newkirk, a Republican. Diana Linnenbringer retired and was replaced by fellow Republican Brent Bassett; no Democrats ran in their party's primary. Incumbent Democratic Circuit Court Clerk Rachelle Beasley was the only member of her party to win re-election for county office; incumbent Republican Collector Terri Mitchell had no opposition in either the primary or the general election. The prosecutor's office did not change parties, but incumbent Deborah Hooper was defeated in the Republican primary in a three-way contest, coming in third behind St. Robert City Attorney Kevin Hillman, the victor, and criminal defense attorney Jeff Thomas. Hillman went on to defeat the Democratic nominee, Wayne Gifford, in the general election.

In the 2012 elections, Democrat John Mackey chose not to run for re-election as county surveyor and was replaced by former surveyor Don Mayhew, a Republican who ran unopposed. Republican Sheriff JB King decided not to run for re-election and his position became the most heavily contested race in the county, with former sheriff JT Roberts losing the Democratic primary to Bill Anderson, who then lost in the general election to Republican candidate Ron Long, who had previously defeated Republican challengers Nick Pappas and Johnny Burgess. Incumbent Republican Ricky Zweerink was re-elected as Western District Commissioner while incumbent Republican Bill Farnham was defeated in a three-way primary race between himself, former county treasurer Barb Shackleford, and victor Lynn Sharp. County Assessor Roger Harrison was re-elected in the November election but died in an accident on his farm before taking office; his deputy, fellow Democrat Kim Skaggs-Henson, was appointed by Gov. Jay Nixon to fill the vacancy.

In the 2014 elections, most county officeholders remained unchanged except for the assessor's position, in which Democrat Kim Skaggs-Henson ran for election to the remainder of the term for which she had been appointed. She was defeated in that race by Republican Dan Whittle.

The Republican Party mostly controls politics at the local level in Pulaski County. Republicans hold all but two of the elected non-judicial positions in the county. Rachelle Beasley was re-elected as the circuit clerk and recorder of deeds. The other Democrat, County Coroner Mikel Hartness, did not face a challenge in his 2012 re-election race. He did not run for re-election in 2016 and was replaced by Republican Gary Carmack.

State Representatives David Day and Steve Lynch were followed by Republican State Representative Bill Hardwick who was elected in 2020.

Pulaski County, Missouri

Elected countywide officials
Assessor	Dan Whittle	Republican
Circuit Clerk	Rachelle Beasley	Democratic
County Clerk	Dave Ernst	Republican
Collector	Terri Mitchell	Republican
Commissioner (presiding)	Gene Newkirk	Republican
Commissioner (district 1)	Charles Bassett	Republican
Commissioner (district 2)	Andy Helms	Republican
Coroner	Roger Graves	Republican
Prosecuting Attorney	Kevin Hillman	Republican
Public Administrator	Loretta Rouse	Republican
Recorder	Rachelle Beasley	Democratic
Sheriff	Jimmy Bench	Republican
Surveyor	Vacant	N/A
Treasurer	Mack Wilkerson	Republican

=== State ===
Past gubernatorial election results
Year	Republican	Democratic	Third Parties
2024	73.17% 11,197	24.05% 3,680	2.79% 426
2020	71.93% 10,261	25.23% 3,599	2.84% 405
2016	67.51% 9,060	28.78% 3,862	3.71% 498
2012	50.90% 6,454	45.97% 5,829	3.12% 396
2008	43.33% 5,627	54.49% 7,075	2.18% 283
2004	65.00% 7,466	33.80% 3,882	1.20% 138
2000	52.78% 5,533	45.19% 4,738	2.03% 213
1996	42.49% 3,855	54.53% 4,947	2.98% 270

Pulaski County is divided between three districts in the Missouri House of Representatives, all of which are held by Republicans.

- District 121 — Don Mayhew (R- Crocker). Consists of Crocker, Dixon, and Richland.
  Missouri House of Representatives — District 121 — Pulaski County (2018)
  Party	Candidate	Votes	%	±%
  Republican	Don Mayhew	3,009	81.02%	
  Democratic	Matt Heltz	699	18.82%	

Missouri House of Representatives — District 121 — Pulaski County (2016)
Party	Candidate	Votes	%	±%
Republican	Keith Frederick	3,879	100.00%	

Missouri House of Representatives — District 121 — Pulaski County (2014)
Party	Candidate	Votes	%	±%
Republican	Keith Frederick	2,144	100.00%	

Missouri House of Representatives — District 121 — Pulaski County (2012)
Party	Candidate	Votes	%	±%
Republican	Keith Frederick	3,681	100.00%	

- District 122 — Steve Lynch (R- Waynesville). Consists of the northern part of Fort Leonard Wood and the communities of St. Robert and Waynesville.
  Missouri House of Representatives — District 122 — Pulaski County (2018)
  Party	Candidate	Votes	%	±%
  Republican	Steve Lynch	5,661	100.00%	

Missouri House of Representatives — District 122 — Pulaski County (2016)
Party	Candidate	Votes	%	±%
Republican	Steve Lynch	7,347	100.00%	

Missouri House of Representatives — District 122 — Pulaski County (2014)
Party	Candidate	Votes	%	±%
Republican	Steve Lynch	3,580	100.00%	

Missouri House of Representatives — District 122 — Pulaski County (2012)
Party	Candidate	Votes	%	±%
Republican	Steve Lynch	6,498	100.00%	

- District 142 — Robert Ross (R- Yukon). Consists of the southern part of Fort Leonard Wood and the unincorporated community of Devils Elbow.

Missouri House of Representatives — District 142 — Pulaski County (2016)
Party	Candidate	Votes	%	±%
Republican	Robert Ross	610	76.15%	−23.85
Democratic	Bobby Johnston, Jr.	191	23.85%	+23.85

Missouri House of Representatives — District 142 — Pulaski County (2014)
Party	Candidate	Votes	%	±%
Republican	Robert Ross	390	100.00%	

Missouri House of Representatives — District 142 — Pulaski County (2012)
Party	Candidate	Votes	%	±%
Republican	Robert Ross	733	100.00%	

All of Pulaski County is a part of Missouri's 16th District in the Missouri Senate and is represented by Dan Brown (R- Rolla).

Missouri Senate — District 16 — Pulaski County (2014)
Party	Candidate	Votes	%	±%
Republican	Dan Brown	5,988	100.00%	

=== Federal ===
U.S. Senate — Missouri — Pulaski County (2016)
Party	Candidate	Votes	%	±%
Republican	Roy Blunt	8,663	64.51%	+18.87
Democratic	Jason Kander	4,065	30.27%	−16.75
Libertarian	Jonathan Dine	354	2.64%	−4.70
Green	Johnathan McFarland	162	1.21%	+1.21
Constitution	Fred Ryman	185	1.38%	+1.38

U.S. Senate — Missouri — Pulaski County (2012)
Party	Candidate	Votes	%	±%
Republican	Todd Akin	6,094	45.64%	
Democratic	Claire McCaskill	6,278	47.02%	
Libertarian	Jonathan Dine	980	7.34%	

All of Pulaski County is included in Missouri's 4th Congressional District and is represented by Vicky Hartzler (R-Harrisonville) in the U.S. House of Representatives.

U.S. House of Representatives — Missouri's 4th Congressional District — Pulaski County (2016)
Party	Candidate	Votes	%	±%
Republican	Vicky Hartzler	9,820	74.10%	−2.46
Democratic	Gordon Christensen	2,796	21.10%	+2.70
Libertarian	Mark Bliss	637	4.80%	−0.24

U.S. House of Representatives — Missouri's 4th Congressional District — Pulaski County (2014)
Party	Candidate	Votes	%	±%
Republican	Vicky Hartzler	5,333	76.56%	+7.94
Democratic	Nate Irvin	1,282	18.40%	−8.85
Libertarian	Herschel L. Young	351	5.04%	+2.01

U.S. House of Representatives — Missouri's 4th Congressional District — Pulaski County (2012)
Party	Candidate	Votes	%	±%
Republican	Vicky Hartzler	9,080	68.62%	
Democratic	Teresa Hensley	3,606	27.25%	
Libertarian	Thomas Holbrook	401	3.03%	
Constitution	Greg Cowan	145	1.10%	

United States presidential election results for Pulaski County, Missouri
Year	Republican		Democratic		Third party(ies)	
Year	No.	%	No.	%	No.	%
1888	662	37.42%	1,048	59.24%	59	3.34%
1892	663	37.50%	1,046	59.16%	59	3.34%
1896	802	36.19%	1,410	63.63%	4	0.18%
1900	728	36.02%	1,282	63.43%	11	0.54%
1904	837	40.95%	1,190	58.22%	17	0.83%
1908	988	40.31%	1,418	57.85%	45	1.84%
1912	631	28.19%	1,268	56.66%	339	15.15%
1916	1,003	41.95%	1,339	56.00%	49	2.05%
1920	1,853	47.88%	1,978	51.11%	39	1.01%
1924	1,578	40.81%	2,127	55.00%	162	4.19%
1928	2,229	53.44%	1,934	46.37%	8	0.19%
1932	1,489	31.24%	3,260	68.40%	17	0.36%
1936	2,177	42.89%	2,886	56.86%	13	0.26%
1940	2,367	46.17%	2,752	53.68%	8	0.16%
1944	2,345	43.43%	3,048	56.44%	7	0.13%
1948	1,644	36.43%	2,858	63.33%	11	0.24%
1952	2,678	46.88%	3,026	52.98%	8	0.14%
1956	2,532	46.31%	2,936	53.69%	0	0.00%
1960	3,285	51.48%	3,096	48.52%	0	0.00%
1964	1,856	35.43%	3,383	64.57%	0	0.00%
1968	2,555	45.82%	2,303	41.30%	718	12.88%
1972	4,243	69.04%	1,903	30.96%	0	0.00%
1976	2,865	39.42%	4,370	60.13%	32	0.44%
1980	3,998	50.79%	3,707	47.10%	166	2.11%
1984	5,330	65.04%	2,865	34.96%	0	0.00%
1988	4,642	57.22%	3,446	42.48%	24	0.30%
1992	3,793	37.98%	4,113	41.18%	2,082	20.85%
1996	4,089	45.04%	3,783	41.67%	1,207	13.29%
2000	6,531	62.02%	3,800	36.08%	200	1.90%
2004	8,618	70.52%	3,551	29.06%	52	0.43%
2008	9,552	63.68%	5,249	34.99%	199	1.33%
2012	9,092	67.00%	4,199	30.94%	280	2.06%
2016	9,876	72.71%	2,922	21.51%	784	5.77%
2020	10,329	71.66%	3,740	25.95%	345	2.39%
2024	11,579	74.47%	3,765	24.21%	205	1.32%

=== Missouri presidential preference primary (2008) ===
Former U.S. Senator Hillary Clinton (D-New York) received more votes, a total of 1,385, than any candidate from either party in Pulaski County during the 2008 presidential primary.

== See also ==
- National Register of Historic Places listings in Pulaski County, Missouri
