= KFLW =

- St. Robert, Missouri; United States
- Broadcast area: Fort Leonard Wood, Missouri; Rolla, Missouri; Waynesville, Missouri
- Frequency: 98.9 MHz
- Branding: 98.9 The Mix

Programming
- Format: Hot adult contemporary

Ownership
- Owner: Benne Broadcasting of the Ozarks, LLC

History
- First air date: March 22, 1994
- Former call signs: KFLD (1991–1994, CP)

Technical information
- Licensing authority: FCC
- Facility ID: 53404
- Class: C3
- ERP: 25,000 watts
- HAAT: 191 meters (627 ft)
- Transmitter coordinates: 37°52′40″N 92°01′06″W

Links
- Public license information: Public file; LMS
- Webcast: Listen live

KFLW is a radio station airing a hot adult contemporary format licensed to St. Robert, Missouri, broadcasting on 98.9 FM. The station serves the areas of Fort Leonard Wood, Missouri, Rolla, Missouri, and Waynesville, Missouri, and is owned by Benne Broadcasting of the Ozarks, LLC.
