= Missouri Route 133 =

State highway in Missouri, U.S.

Route 133
- MO 133 highlighted in red

Route information
- Maintained by MoDOT
- Length: 71.160 mi (114.521 km)

Major junctions
- South end: I-44 west of Waynesville
- North end: US 63 north of Westphalia

Location
- Country: United States
- State: Missouri

Highway system
- Missouri State Highway System; Interstate; US; State; Supplemental
← Route 131	→ Route 134

Route 133 is a highway in central Missouri. Its northern terminus is at U.S. Route 63 near Westphalia; its southern terminus is at Interstate 44 about fourteen miles (23 km) west of Waynesville.

Highway 133 passes through Richland, where the highway intersects with Route 7.

== Major intersections ==
County	Location	mi	km	Destinations	Notes
Pulaski	Gascozark	0.000	0.000	I-44 – Rolla, Springfield	exit 145
Laclede	No major junctions				
Pulaski	Richland	6.532	10.512	Route 7 north (Washington Avenue)	Southern end of Route 7 overlap
Pulaski	Richland	7.670	12.344	Route 7 south to I-44	Northern end of Route 7 overlap
Pulaski	Tavern Township	17.902	28.810	Route 17 south – Waynesville	Southern end of Route 17 overlap
Pulaski	Tavern Township	20.748	33.391	Route 17 north – Iberia	Northern end of Route 17 overlap
Maries	Boone Township	43.504	70.013	Route 42 east – Vienna	Southern end of Route 42 overlap
Maries	Boone Township	43.725	70.369	Route 42 west – Iberia	Northern end of Route 42 overlap
Maries	Boone Township	53.970	86.856	Route 52 west – St. Elizabeth	
Osage	Meta	56.214	90.468	Route B – St. Thomas	
Osage	Jackson Township	58.684	94.443	Route P – Koeltztown	
Osage	Washington Township	71.160	114.521	US 63 – Westphalia, Jefferson City	
1.000 mi = 1.609 km; 1.000 km = 0.621 mi: Concurrency terminus
