= Devils Elbow, Missouri =

Unincorporated community in Missouri, U.S.

- unincorporated community
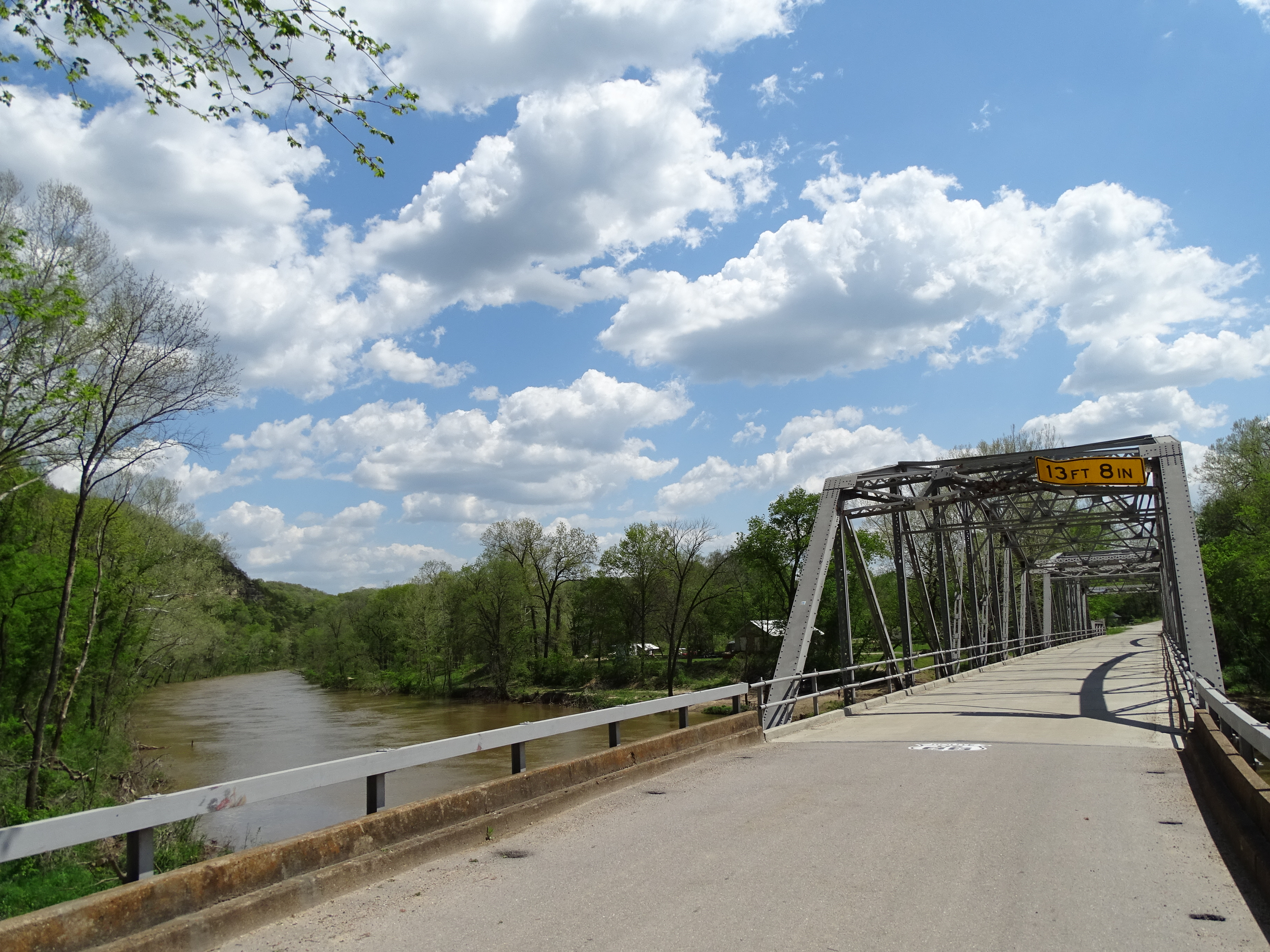
- Devils Elbow Bridge

- Location within Missouri
- Coordinates: 37°50′45″N 92°03′50″W
- Country: United States
- State: Missouri
- County: Pulaski
- Elevation: 748 ft (228 m)
- GNIS feature ID: 749642

Devils Elbow is an unincorporated community in Pulaski County, Missouri, United States on historic U.S. Highway 66. It is situated on the Big Piney River and is named for a tight incised meander in the river known as a "devil of an elbow". The community is approximately five miles (8 km) east of St. Robert.

== History ==
In the 19th and early 20th centuries, lumbermen were busy upstream cutting the short leaf pine or hacking railroad ties from the hardwoods. Rafters floated the planks and ties down the Big Piney to the railroad yard at Arlington on the Gasconade River, but they first had to negotiate the sharp bend in the river where rafts sometimes broke up and ties were lost. The rafters named the bend in the river the Devil's Elbow. The hamlet of Devils Elbow is located on the inside of the bend.

The Devil's Elbow area was a destination for St. Louis sportsmen beginning in the late 19th century. It is on the fine fishing stream of the Big Piney which flows into the Gasconade River a few miles north. The surrounding forest provided good hunting. Before improved highway access, the sportsmen came by train to Dixon, 12 miles north, and then by wagon to the area. Early autoists negotiated State Highway 14, part gravel and part dirt, which ran from St. Louis to Springfield, Missouri.

As part of the improvement of State Highway 14 in 1923, a steel truss bridge was constructed that spanned the Big Piney River across the lower portion of the elbow. In 1926, Highway 14 was renumbered as U. S. Highway 66. A post office named Devil's Elbow was established in 1927 by Walter E. Graham in the office/store of his Graham’s Resort and Camp, located a quarter mile south of the bridge. A few years later, Nelle Munger and Howard Moss built the Munger-Moss Sandwich Shop on the north side of the bridge and Dwight Rench erected the native rock Devil's Elbow Cafe on the south side. Graham and Rench offered rental cabins to the increasing number of tourists on Route 66. During the 1930s, the village became a stopping point on Route 66. Its bluffs were listed by the State Planning Commission as one of the seven beauty spots in Missouri.

The community experienced a population surge during World War II boom associated with the construction and development of Fort Leonard Wood, which is located five miles to the west. Numerous rental cabins and small houses were constructed, along with a two-story market/apartment building. Highway traffic decreased with the completion in late 1945 of the divided four-lane section of Route 66 which bypassed the community to the north. However, U. S. and foreign fans of the Mother Road today still find Devil's Elbow alongside the original 1926 route.

The bridge at Devil's Elbow is iconic in stature. It is one of only two bridges left on Route 66 with a dogleg (curve) and the only one open to traffic. (The other bridge is the Chain of Rocks in St. Louis, which is closed to vehicular traffic.) Concern for the structural integrity of the 588-foot steel truss bridge came to the fore in the new millennium. The last major maintenance was in the 1970s when the cracking and separating of the concrete piers received some attention. Structural steel elements continued to deteriorate from rusting. With the decommissioning of Route 66 in 1985, the highway ceased to be a federal responsibility. It had long lost its state highway status. The maintenance of the historic route and bridge became the responsibility of Pulaski County.

The county commissioners in 2002 affirmed their dedication to saving the bridge. An early estimate for rehabilitation was $2.5 million, which included structural work and removing the lead-based paint prior to repainting. The cost far exceeded the county’s resources and additional funding was sought. Finally, on October 24, 2013, a groundbreaking ceremony was held to commemorate the start of renovations. The $1.3 million cost was a combination of grants from the Federal Highway Administration, Missouri Department of Transportation, National Park Service, Department of Housing and Urban Development, United States Department of Agriculture, and Pulaski County. The reduced cost was partly achieved by encapsulating the lead-based paint rather than removing it. The rehabilitated bridge reopened to traffic on May 22, 2014. The bridge project is a testament to local perseverance, inter-governmental cooperation, and creativity in preserving the cultural environment.

In April 2017, multiple properties in the area were listed as the Devil’s Elbow Historic District, part of the National Park Service’s National Register of Historic Places program. Also listed was Piney Beach, a native rock tourist court located two miles to the northwest of Devils Elbow. The Historic District properties consist of the bridge and historic roadbed, along with five other structures. The scenic views are a bonus.

== Transportation ==
The major east-west route is Interstate 44; before its construction, the main highway was U.S. Route 66, which still exists as a scenic route through the area and passes through Devil's Elbow, St. Robert, Waynesville, Buckhorn, and Hazelgreen. Names for U.S. Route 66 vary - at different places, it is called Teardrop Road, Highway Z, Old Route 66, Historic Route 66, and Highway 17. State-posted signs mark most of the alignment of the road.

The original alignment of Route 66, now known as Teardrop Road, runs through Devil's Elbow and is the site of the historic Devil's Elbow Bridge. A later realignment, Highway Z, runs near Devil's Elbow and bypasses the community.

Three bridges cross the Big Piney River at Devils Elbow—the modern Interstate 44 bridge, the later U.S. Route 66 alignment on Highway Z that was made possible by the Hooker Cut through a steep hillside, and the original U.S. Route 66 alignment on Teardrop Road that includes a historic bridge that's in the process of renovation.
