= List of ghost towns in Missouri =

This is an incomplete list of ghost towns in Missouri.

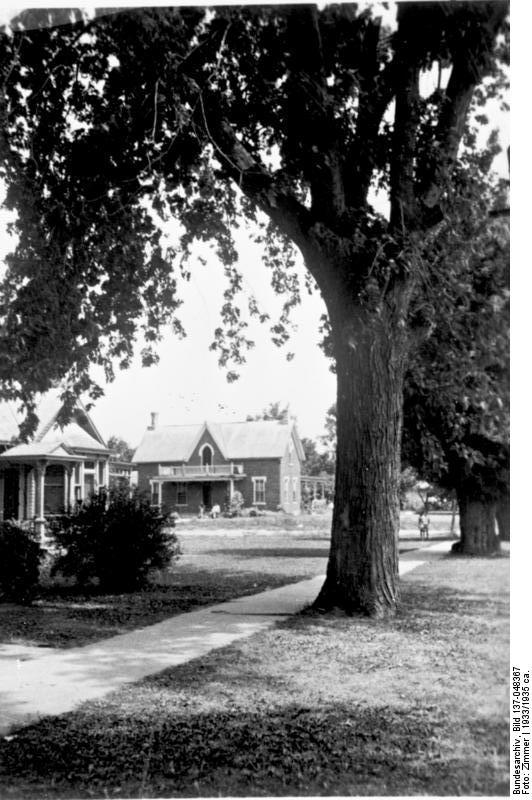
A street in Hamburg, Missouri, 1933

- Ark (Dent County)
- Arlington (Phelps County)
- Bloodland (Pulaski County)
- Cave (Lincoln County)
- Columbia / St. Vrain
- Cookville (Pulaski County)
- Doolittle (Phelps County)
- Far West (Caldwell County)
- Flag Springs (Andrew County)
- Georgia City (Jasper County)
- Hamburg (St. Charles County)
- Holman (Webster County)
- Hopewell (Daviess County)
- Hopewell (Mississippi County)
- Hopewell Furnace (Washington County)
- Howell (St. Charles County)
- Lakeside (Miller County)
- Lakeside Estate (Benton County)
- Lone Tree (Cass County)
- Melva (Taney County)
- Monark Springs (Newton County)
- (Old) Pattonsburg, Missouri ( Daviess County)
- Phenix (Greene County)
- Plew (Lawrence County)
- Possum Trot (Stone County)
- Pulaskifield ( Barry County)
- Radical (Stone County)
- Rueter (Taney County)
- Saint Annie (Laclede County)
- Sampsel (Livingston County)
- San Andres Del Misuri (St. Charles County)
- Siloam Springs (Gentry County)
- Sparta (Buchanan County)
- Spencer (Lawrence County)
- Tea (Gasconade County)
- Times Beach (St. Louis County)
- Toonerville (St. Charles County)
- Xenia (Nodaway County)
- Wakenda (Carroll County)
- Wila (New Madrid County)

Hamburg, Howell, and Toonerville were all located in St. Charles County. All three towns became part of the Weldon Spring Ordnance Works in 1941 for WWII, which later became part of the Weldon Spring Site Remedial Action Project (WSSRAP).
