= List of Superfund sites in Missouri =

This is a list of Superfund sites in Missouri designated under the Comprehensive Environmental Response, Compensation, and Liability Act (CERCLA) environmental law. The CERCLA federal law of 1980 authorized the United States Environmental Protection Agency (EPA) to create a list of polluted locations requiring a long-term response to clean up hazardous material contaminations. These locations are known as Superfund sites, and are placed on the National Priorities List (NPL).

The NPL guides the EPA in "determining which sites warrant further investigation" for environmental remediation. As of May 1, 2010, there were thirty Superfund sites on the National Priorities List in Missouri. One more site has been proposed for entry on the list and five others have been cleaned up and removed from it.

== Superfund sites ==
Proposed for addition to National Priorities List
Deleted from National Priorities List

CERCLIS ID	Name	City	Reason	Proposed	Listed	Construction completed	Partially deleted	Deleted
MO0000958611	Annapolis Lead Mine	Annapolis	Heavy metal contamination at a former lead mine site, including tailings piles. The most prevalent contaminant is lead, although cadmium, arsenic, and zinc were also present. Two nearby streams were also contaminated.	03/08/2004	07/22/2004	09/25/2007	–	9/30/2020
MOD046750253	Armour Road	North Kansas City	The site was used by a series of herbicide businesses, including for manufacturing purposes, between 1948 and 1986. A 1989 inspection detected contamination from arsenic, pentachlorophenol, 2,4-D, and 2,4,5-T. Cleanup activities at the site have included building demolition and removal of contaminated soil. The site has since been redeveloped and now is the location of new businesses.	01/19/1999	05/10/1999	–	–	–
MOD980860522	Bee Cee Manufacturing Plant	Malden	A manufacturing company that produced aluminum parts for doors and storm windows dumped wastewater directly into the soil. The water was contaminated with chromium. Cleanup at the site has included soil removal and ended in 2010.	10/15/1984	06/10/1986	09/10/1999	–	–
MOD981126899	Big River Mine Tailings/St. Joe Minerals	Desloge	Mine tailings containing lead, cadmium, and zinc were deposited through mining activities conducted by St. Joe Minerals. Some of the tailings have contaminated Big River, and the soil and airborne dust are also affected. Cleanup at the site has including stabilizing eroding tailings piles and capping tailings. Complaints were lodged in 2009 against the methods used by the Doe Run Company to remediate part of the site.	02/07/1992	10/14/1992	–	–	–
MON000706143	Compass Plaza Well TCE	Rogersville	Groundwater contamination with trichloroethylene was detected by the Missouri Department of Natural Resources in 2010 near a commercial site known as Compass Plaza. The source of the pollution is not known.	9/16/2011	3/15/2012	–	–	
MOD000829705	Conservation Chemical Company	Kansas City	Groundwater contamination from manufacturing chemicals. The site was initially handled by the Resource Conservation and Recovery Act, but was proposed to be added to the Superfund listing on June 24, 1988, as Conservation Chemical Company was deemed by the EPA to be noncooperative. Contamination of both groundwater and soils includes cyanide, phenolic compounds, volatile organic compounds, dioxins, and polychlorinated biphenyl. Conservation Chemical Company had buried some wastes at the site. Buildings and equipment present have been demolished, and a soil cap has been added.	06/24/1988	10/04/1989	09/23/1991	–	–
MOD980633010	Ellisville Site	Ellisville	Soil was contaminated by dioxins and VOCs from oil, chemical and industrial waste disposal. Airborne dust and groundwater contamination were potential risks.	12/30/1982	09/08/1983	09/30/1997	7/17/2017	–
MOD980631139	Fulbright Landfill	Springfield	Groundwater and waste contained VOCs, other organic compounds, heavy metals and cyanides. Adjacent river sediments were found to be contaminated with chromium and groundwater flows into these rivers. The site is within the rivers' flood plains.	12/30/1982	09/08/1983	06/03/1992	–	–
MOD980631113	Kem-Pest Laboratories	Cape Girardeau	Contamination at a former pesticide plant, including heptachlor, chlordane, aldrin, and endrin were detected in an aquifer. Drainage channel sediments were also found to be contaminated. It was located in the floodplain of the Mississippi River.	01/22/1987	10/04/1989	09/27/1996	–	09/20/2001
MO3213890012	Lake City Army Ammunition Plant	Independence	Groundwater, soil, and surface water are contaminated with VOCs, various explosives, perchlorates, and heavy metals including lead, arsenic, and chromium.	10/15/1984	07/22/1987	–	–	–
MOD980853519	Lee Chemical	Liberty	Ground water, surface water, and soil are contaminated with TCE.	10/15/1984	06/10/1986	03/23/1994	–	–
MOD098633415	Madison County Mines	Fredericktown	Lead and other heavy metal contamination of groundwater, soil and surface water from former mining sites.	04/30/2003	09/29/2003	–	–	–
MOD980741912	Minker/Stout/Romaine Creek	Imperial	A horse arena was sprayed with oil for dust control but the oil was contaminated with dioxins. Seven horses died and more became ill. The arena was excavated in 1972 and the contaminated soil was used as fill for residential properties. Sediments in Romaine Creek are also contaminated.	12/30/1982	09/08/1983	09/30/1997	–	–
MOD980965982	Missouri Electric Works	Cape Girardeau	Air, groundwater and soil contamination by VOCs and PCBs from recycling transformer oil. Some waste oil was also used for dust suppression on local properties.	06/24/1988	02/21/1990	–	9/14/2021	–
MOD981507585	Newton County Mine Tailings Site	Granby	Groundwater and soil contamination by lead and cadmium from mining operations. It is estimated that over 700 drinking water wells are contaminated.	04/30/2003	09/29/2003	04/13/2009	–	–
MOD985798339	Newton County Wells	Joplin	TCE contamination of groundwater and drinking water wells from former ball bearing manufacturing plant.	01/19/1999	07/27/2000	–	–	–
MOD007163108	North-U Drive Well Contamination	Springfield	Several private wells on North-U Drive were found to be contaminated with volatile organic compounds. The affected wells were located near Fulbright Spring, a major public water source. CERCLA funds were used to connect residences in the area to city water and plug affected wells. The site was removed because the contamination was found to have been caused by petroleum, which is outside of the scope of Superfund operations.	10/15/1984	06/10/1986	03/31/1993	–	09/08/1994
MOD981717036	Oak Grove Village Well	Oak Grove Village	TCE contamination of the Oak Grove Village municipal well from an unknown source.	09/13/2001	09/05/2002	–	–	–
MOD980686281	Oronogo-Duenweg Mining Belt	Jasper County	Significant contamination of groundwater, surface water and soil by cadmium, lead and zinc from mining, milling and smelting of metal ores. At least 200 private drinking water wells are contaminated with lead and cadmium. At least 2,300 residential yards are contaminated with lead and at least 300 homes have been built on or near milling waste piles.	06/24/1988	08/30/1990	–	–	–
MO0000958835	Pools Prairie	Neosho	Private drinking water wells contaminated with VOCs including TCE and carbon tetrachloride.	01/19/1999	09/17/1999	–	–	–
MOD980860555	Quality Plating	Sikeston	Groundwater contamination by lead and hexavalent chromium from former electroplating operations.	01/15/1984	06/10/1986	09/28/1999	–	–
MOD981720246	Riverfront	Franklin	Groundwater, surface water, and soil are contaminated with PCE.	07/27/2000	12/01/2000	–	9/14/2021	–
MOD980685838	Shenandoah Stables	Moscow Mills, Missouri	A horse arena sprayed with dioxin-laced oil in 1971 for dust control. A number of animals, including 40 horses, died as a result, and several humans were sickened. The contaminated soil was later dumped elsewhere as fill. Cleanup efforts were officially declared completed in 1997.	12/30/1982	09/08/1983	09/30/1997	–	09/25/2001
MOD980854111	Solid State Circuits, Inc.	Republic	Groundwater is contaminated by VOCs, including TCE, methylene chloride and chloroform. Contaminated soil has been cleaned up.	10/15/1984	06/10/1986	11/18/1993	–	–
MOD980633176	St. Louis Airport/Hazelwood Interim Storage/Futura Coatings Co.	St. Louis	Soil contamination by uranium, thorium and radium and groundwater uranium contamination from uranium ore processing associated with the Manhattan Project and from transportation and dumping of process residues. The site encompasses dozens of locations in North St. Louis County including the length of Cold Water Creek. Wastes with the same origin were also trucked to the West Lake Landfill, listed separately.	05/05/1989	10/04/1989	–	–	–
MON000705443	Southwest Jefferson County Mining	Jefferson County	Extensive lead contamination of soils at at least 594 residential properties and in at least 39 private drinking water wells, from former mining, milling and smelting operations.	04/09/2009	09/23/2009	–	–	–
MON000703541	Sporlan Valve Plant#1	Washington			5/15/2019			
MOD007452154	Syntex Facility, Inc.	Verona	Soil, surface water and groundwater contaminated by dioxins and VOCs and Spring River aquatic life contaminated by dioxins, from chemical manufacture.	12/30/1982	09/08/1983	09/16/1998	–	–
MOD980685226	Times Beach Site	Times Beach	Beginning in the 1970s, the city had its unpaved roads sprayed with oil to keep down dust. The contractor who sprayed the oil mixed it with waste from a company that had manufactured Agent Orange to lower costs, which introduced hexachlorophene and dioxin contaminants. About 265,000 short tons (237,000 long tons) of soil became contaminated, and the entire town was evacuated and demolished. The site is now Route 66 State Park.	03/04/1983	09/08/1983	09/30/1997	–	09/25/2001
MOD980968341	Valley Park TCE	Valley Park	Groundwater contamination by VOCs including PCE and trichloroethane. Municipal and industrial water supplies are affected.	04/10/1985	06/10/1986	09/19/2006	–	–
MON000705803	Vienna Wells	Vienna	Three drinking water wells are contaminated with PCE believed to come from the site of a former hat factory.	03/04/2010	9/29/2010	–	–	–
MON000705842	Washington County Lead District - Furnace Creek	Caledonia			3/10/2011			
MON000705027	Washington County - Old Mines	Old Mines	Surface soil at 290 residential properties and 124 private drinking water wells are contaminated with lead. Occasional elevated levels of barite, arsenic, and cadmium have also been identified at the site.	09/19/2007	03/19/2008	–	–	–
MON000705023	Washington County - Potosi	Potosi	Surface soil at 716 residential properties and 138 private drinking water wells are contaminated with lead. Occasional elevated levels of barite, arsenic, and cadmium have also been identified.	09/19/2007	03/19/2008	–	–	–
MON000705032	Washington County - Richwoods	Richwoods	Surface soil at 65 residential properties and 49 private drinking water wells are contaminated with lead. Occasional elevated levels of barite, arsenic, and cadmium have also been identified.	09/19/2007	03/19/2008	–	–	–
MO5210021288	Weldon Spring Former Army Ordnance Works	St. Charles	TNT, DNT, and lead have been identified in soil at several areas on the site, and TNT was detected in 1987 in surface water downstream of the lagoons.	07/14/1989	02/21/1990	08/24/2005	–	–
MO3210090004	Weldon Spring Quarry/Plant/Pits (USDOE/USARMY)	St. Charles	Wastewater containing sulfonate derivatives contaminated surface water and groundwater. Residues from uranium ore, thorium ore, radium, TNT, and DNT residues.	10/15/1984	07/22/1987	08/22/2005	–	–
MOD079900932	Westlake Landfill	St. Louis	Soils mixed with uranium ore processing residues were used as daily cover in the landfilling operation.	10/26/1989	08/30/1990	–	–	–
MOD000830554	Wheeling Disposal Service Co, Landfill	Amazonia	Hazardous wastes were dumped in a landfill in the early 1980s, including pesticides, cyanide, and asbestos. Testing in 1980, 1982, and 1983 detected trichloroethylene, chloroform, and 1,2-dichloroethane in wells and springs onsite. Both the soil and groundwater in the area were determined to be contaminated. Cleanup at the site included improving the landfill cover and installing a barrier around the site.	01/22/1987	10/04/1989	09/27/1994	–	10/30/2000

== See also ==
- List of Superfund sites in the United States
- TOXMAP
