= Toonerville, Missouri =

Unincorporated community in Missouri, U.S.

Coordinates: 38°41′30″N 90°44′00″W

Toonerville is an unincorporated community in St. Charles County, in the U.S. state of Missouri.

== History ==
Toonerville had its start as a roadside gas station whose owner included the image of a popular comic in his sign. The community was named after Toonerville Folks, a comic strip.

In the 1930s, Weldon Spring was isolated from the greater St. Louis area due to the Missouri River. Three towns: Hamburg, Howell, and Toonerville, were connections to the outside world as the Missouri, Kansas, and Texas Railroads had stops in Hamburg. Southern St. Charles county gained direct access to the St. Louis area because of the completion of the Daniel Boone Bridge in 1937. Locals had intended this project to increase opportunities for the county, however it gave the U.S. Army an area in rural Missouri, to develop weapons for the anticipated WWII.

Before the attacks on Pearl Harbor, the U.S. Army wanted to utilize an isolated spot to develop explosive weapons such as TNT and DNT explosives.

In October 1940, local newspapers had announced that the U.S. Army was going to take 17,000 acres of land through eminent domain and that the townspeople who inhabited these areas had three months to vacate their homes.

Houses, churches, and school buildings were immediately demolished and the town ceased to exist within three months of the order.

The Weldon Springs Ordnance Works, operated by Atlas Power Company, began production in 1941 employing more than 5,000 people and maintained more than 1,000 buildings. It ceased production on August 15, 1945, when the Japanese Surrendered. By that time, the plant had produced more than 700 million tons of TNT.

After selling land to various conservation departments, the United States Atomic Energy Commission retained 2,000 acres to build a uranium ore processing plant in 1955. The Weldon Spring Uranium Feed Mill Plant, operated by Mallinkrodt Chemical Works of St. Louis, produced raw uranium ore into "yellow cake", or concentrated ore that is then shipped to other countries. In 1966, the uranium plant ceased operation. During the Vietnam War, the Army planned to use the land to produce Agent Orange, but this plan was never carried out. The land sat empty for twenty years with contaminated equipment and hazardous chemicals.

The U.S. Department of Energy took over the site in the 1980s and began studying various ways to clean up hazardous and radioactive waste. This started a long and controversial project led by the Department of Energy, state and county governments and thousands of residents, in 1992, to remove contaminated materials from Weldon Spring site to a designated 45-acre area designed to safely contain the hazardous waste for over a thousand years. The official name of this site is the Weldon Spring Site Remedial Action Project (WSSRAP).

== Conservation areas ==
The army started to sell pieces of land after the war. The Missouri Department of Conservation bought 7,000 acres with a donation from August Busch. The University of Missouri bought another 7,000 which was later sold to the Conservation Department. Today, this property is part of the Busch Memorial Conservation Area and the Weldon Spring Conservation Area.

== Tourist attractions ==
After the various efforts to clean up hazardous materials, the land is now used for fishing, hiking, hunting, and bicycling.

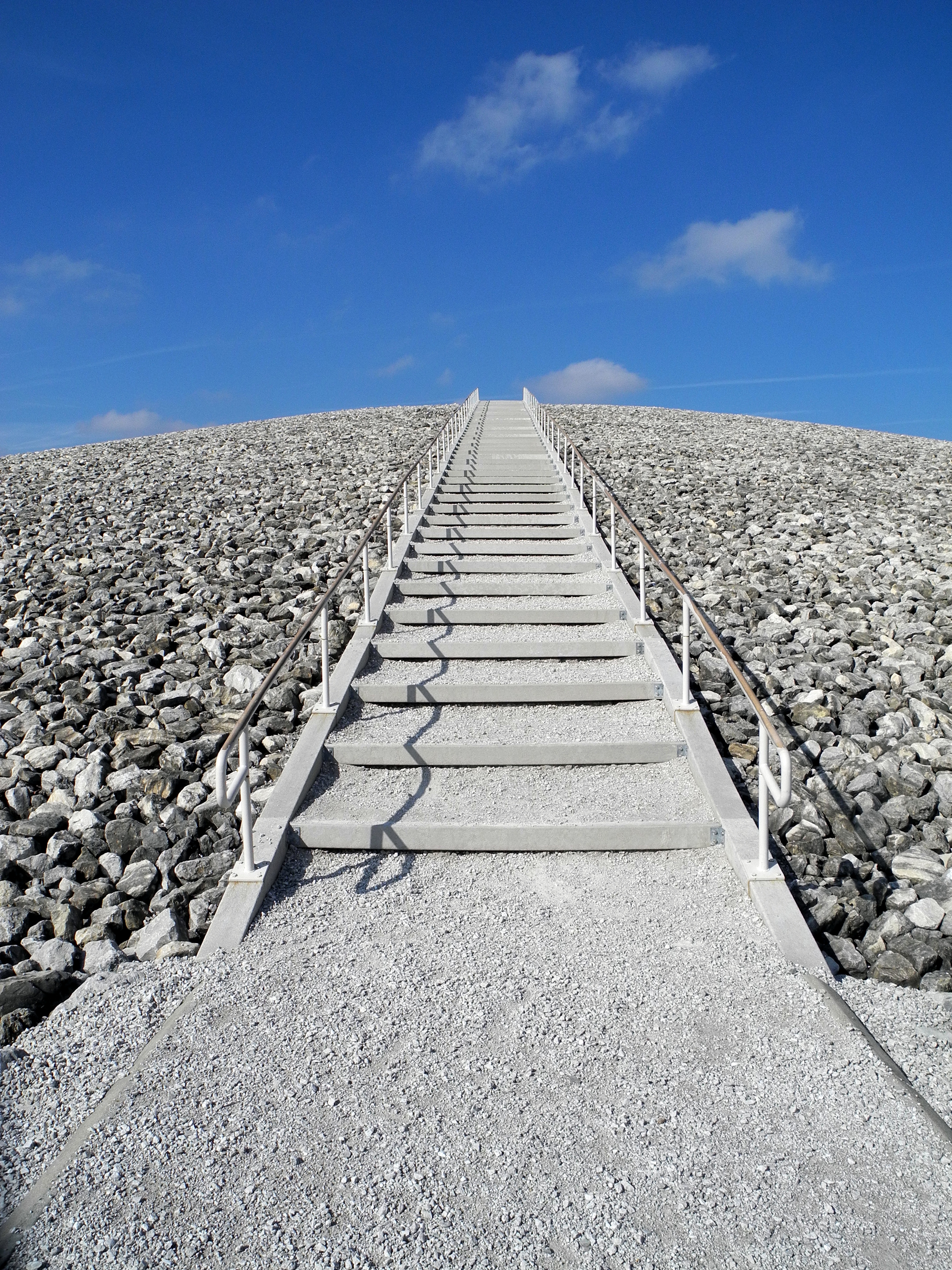
Stairs leading up the massive waste containing structure to the highest peak in St. Charles.

=== The Weldon Spring Site Remedial Action Project (WSSRAP) ===
In 2001, the completion of the gargantuan structure covered roughly 45 acres and stores 1.5 million cubic yards of hazardous waste material. Visitors can take the stairs that lead to its peak, where there is a viewing platform and plaques that provide information on the local area, its history, and the construction of the waste preserving site. Visitors can also see the 9,000-square-foot interpretive center housed in a building at the base of the cell that was once used to check workers for radioactivity. The peak of the Weldon Spring waste cell is the highest point in St. Charles County.

=== Weldon Spring's Lewis and Clark Trails ===
There are two distinctive trails within the Weldon Spring Conservation area south of route 94 and north of the Missouri River. Both trails sync up at a scenic view of the Missouri River.

==== The Lewis Trail ====
The Lewis Trail, the longer of the two at 7.9 miles, covers the length from Route 94 towards the Missouri River and also extends closer to the Missouri Bluffs Golf Club in a loop that heads back north towards 94.

==== The Clark Trail ====
The Clark trail is roughly 5.3 miles long and begins with the same trail as Lewis for two and a half miles until the trails split near the Missouri River.
