= Kurt Bahr =

American businessman and politician

Saint Charles County Director of Elections
- Incumbent
- Assumed office January 2019
- Preceded by: Rich Chrismer

Member of the Missouri House of Representatives from the 102nd district
- In office January 2013 – January 2019
- Succeeded by: Ron Hicks

Member of the Missouri House of Representatives from the 19th district
- In office January 2011 – January 2013
- Succeeded by: John Rizzo

Personal details
- Born: St. Charles, Missouri
- Party: Republican
- Children: 6
- Education: Oklahoma Wesleyan University, Regent University

Kurt Bahr is an American businessman and Republican politician from the state of Missouri. He is currently the St. Charles County director of elections.

In 2001, Bahr earned a bachelor's degree in History and Political Science from Oklahoma Wesleyan University. After serving in the U.S. Air Force from 2001 to 2006, he owned a contracting company from 2006 to 2018. In 2008, Bahr earned a master's degree in Public Policy from Regent University.

Bahr was first elected to the Missouri House of Representatives from Missouri's 19th district in November 2010, and re-elected after that from the state's 102nd district. He represented a portion of Saint Charles County in the Weldon Spring area, straddling U.S. Route 40/61 on both sides of the Weldon Spring Conservation Area. Term limited in 2018, Bahr instead ran for and was elected to the office of St. Charles County Director of Elections. Republican Ron Hicks was elected to succeed him in 2019 as the representative from district 102. In November 2022, Bahr was reelected as director of elections without opposition after winning a six-way primary election in April.

In October 2024, Bahr announced that St. Charles County had exceeded 300,000 registered voters and was among the top one percent of counties in the U.S. at having eligible voters registered to vote.

== Election results ==
St. Charles County Director of Elections (2018)
Party	Candidate	Votes	%	±%
Republican	Kurt Bahr	94,942	57.5%	
Democratic	John Callahan	70,144	42.5%	

Missouri House of Representatives — District 102 — St. Charles County (2016)
Party	Candidate	Votes	%	±%
Republican	Kurt Bahr	16,978	+100.00%	+30.19

Missouri House of Representatives — District 102 — St. Charles County (2014)
Party	Candidate	Votes	%	±%
Republican	Kurt Bahr	6,809	69.81%	+7.08
Democratic	John Callahan	2,944	30.19%	−7.08

Missouri House of Representatives — District 102 — St. Charles County (2012)
Party	Candidate	Votes	%	±%
Republican	Kurt Bahr	11,713	62.73%	
Democratic	John Callahan	6,960	37.27%	

Missouri House of Representatives — District 19 — St. Charles County (2010)
Party	Candidate	Votes	%	±%
Republican	Kurt Bahr	10,474		
Democratic	Matt Simmons	5,185		
