= Howell, Missouri (ghost town) =

Place in St. Charles County, Missouri, United States

Coordinates: 38.694°N 90.766°W

Howell was a small town in St. Charles County, Missouri, United States.

== Description ==
Howell was one of three towns, along with nearby Hamburg and Toonerville, that were evacuated and terminated in 1940–1941 when the area was taken over by the United States Department of the Army for the Weldon Spring Ordnance Works, which manufactured trinitrotoluene (TNT) and dinitrotoluene (DNT) and later processed uranium.
