= Weldon Springs =

Weldon Springs may refer to:

- Weldon Springs (Missouri), a spring in Missouri
- Weldon Springs State Park, a protected area in Illinois

== See also ==
- Weldon Spring, Missouri
