= Ron Hicks =

American politician

Member of the Missouri House of Representatives from the 102nd district
- In office January 2019 – January 2023
- Preceded by: Kurt Bahr
- Succeeded by: Richard West (redistricting)

Member of the Missouri House of Representatives from the 107th district
- In office January 2013 – August 2016
- Preceded by: Linda Black Fischer
- Succeeded by: Nick Schroer

Personal details
- Party: Republican
- Children: 2

Ron Hicks is an American politician from the state of Missouri. A Republican, he represented district 102 in the Missouri House of Representatives from 2019 to 2023. He previously represented district 107 from 2013 to 2016.

== Missouri House of Representatives ==
=== 107th district ===
Hicks was first elected to the Missouri House from the 107th district in November 2012, and re-elected in 2014. He chose not to run for re-election in 2016, and instead ran unsuccessfully for mayor of St. Peters. After moving outside his district in June, Hicks resigned from the House in August 2016.

=== 102nd district ===
Hicks ran in 2018 to represent the 102nd district in the Missouri House. After winning his party's primary election by only four votes, he went on to win the 2018 general election with about a 20 percent margin. Days before the primary, Hicks' campaign distributed flyers that falsely claimed he was the "only candidate endorsed" by the Missouri Right to Life PAC. Members of the Hicks campaign report the false claim was actually an error on the part of the printing company and Hicks was never approached by local media to apologize or tell his side of the story.

Hicks represented a portion of Saint Charles County in the Weldon Spring area, straddling U.S. Route 40/61 on both sides of the Weldon Spring Conservation Area. He succeeded Kurt Bahr who was term limited and instead ran for and won as Director of Elections.

== Election results ==
Missouri House of Representatives — District 102 — St. Charles County (2020)
Party	Candidate	Votes	%	±%
Republican	Ron Hicks	14,080	62.4%	
Democratic	Tracy Grundy	8,492	37.6%	

Missouri House of Representatives — District 102 — St. Charles County (2018)
Party	Candidate	Votes	%	±%
Republican	Ron Hicks	8,596	60.5%	
Democratic	John Foster	5,608	39.5%	

Missouri House of Representatives Primary — District 102 — St. Charles County (2018)
Party	Candidate	Votes	%	±%
Republican	Ron Hicks	2,282	50.04%	
Republican	Bryan Cooper	2,278	49.96%	

Missouri House of Representatives — District 107 — St. Charles County (2014)
Party	Candidate	Votes	%	±%
Republican	Ron Hicks	6,861	99.82%	
Write-in		12	0.18%	

Missouri House of Representatives — District 107 — St. Charles County (2012)
Party	Candidate	Votes	%	±%
Republican	Ron Hicks	9,628	55.58%	
Democratic	Rod Hoffman	7,695	44.42%	
