= Francis Howell High School =

Public secondary school in St. Charles, Missouri, United States

Location
- 7001 Highway 94 South; St. Charles, Missouri 63304; United States; 38°42′08″N 90°42′59″W

Information
- Type: Public high school
- Motto: It's a Great Day to be a Viking!
- Established: 1881; 145 years ago
- School district: Francis Howell School District
- Principal: Dave Wedlock
- Teaching staff: 91.50 (FTE)
- Grades: 9–12
- Enrollment: 1,844 (2023–24)
- Student to teacher ratio: 20.15
- Colors: Blue and gold
- Mascot: Victor the Viking
- Nickname: Vikings
- Yearbook: Howelltonian
- Website: fhhs.fhsdschools.org

Francis Howell High School is a four-year public high school located in unincorporated St. Charles County, Missouri. Approximately 1,800 students from Cottleville, Defiance, New Melle, O'Fallon, Saint Peters, Weldon Spring, and Weldon Spring Heights attend the school. It is part of the Francis Howell School District. The school's mascot is Victor the Viking.

== History ==
The school's origins date to 1881, when Francis Howell Institute opened in Howell's Prairie. The institute was named for Francis Howell, an early settler and promoter of education who helped establish it and left a fund for the school when he died in 1843. Lewis Howell had earlier opened a one-room schoolhouse, Howell's Prairie School, on October 1, 1821. The Howell family subsequently opened additional schools, including Francis Howell Institute.

On September 28, 1915, the Consolidated District Number 2 school board voted to name the new high school building "Francis Howell High School". On February 15, 1916, the new Francis Howell High School was dedicated. The district's history identifies the high school as a continuation of Francis Howell Institute and states that it held its first day of school on September 6, 1915.

The current building is located between Highway 94 South and Highway D. The property was originally purchased in 1949 from the federal government under the jurisdiction of the War Assets Administration. The barracks located on the property were used by the school for several years before being demolished in 1991.

Today, Francis Howell High School is a large suburban high school, reflecting population growth in southern St. Charles County. The school's athletic and academic teams were known as the "Dragoons" beginning in May 1950 and were renamed the "Vikings" in 1962.

Construction on a new academic building began in the summer of 2009 and was completed in 2011. The new building features a cafeteria, media center, and classrooms.

== Athletics ==
The Vikings football team won the Class 5 State Championship in 2022 with a 14–0 record. This was the school's first football state championship.

Francis Howell Hockey Club participates in the Mid-States Club Hockey Association (MSCHA), which is governed by Missouri Hockey, an affiliate of USA Hockey.

== Notable alumni ==
- Brett Norfleet (2023), college football tight end for the Missouri Tigers
- Patrick Schulte (2019), professional soccer goalkeeper for Columbus Crew
- Sutton Smith (2015), professional football player for the Las Vegas Raiders
- Calvin Munson (2013), professional football player for the New England Patriots
- Brett Graves (2011), professional baseball pitcher
- Nate Orf (2008), professional baseball designated hitter
- Adam Long (2004), professional golfer
- Mark Parkinson (1991), former Missouri 105th (formerly known as 16th) district state representative
- Joe Smith (1991), former Missouri 14th district state representative
- Sammie Henson (1989), two-time NCAA national champion, 1998 world champion, and 2000 Olympic freestyle silver medalist
- Matt Dillahunty (1987), atheist activist
- Jeff Hartwig (1985), pole vaulter and American indoor record holder, member of the 1996 and 2008 US Olympic teams
- Dave Weckl (1978), jazz drummer
- Tricia Byrnes, politician
