= Hoffman-Taff =

Missouri based Chemical Company

Hoffman-Taff, Inc
- Company type: Private
- Industry: Chemicals
- Founded: 1946; 79 years ago in Springfield, Missouri, United States
- Defunct: December 1, 1969
- Fate: Acquired by Syntex Agribusiness
- Area served: United States
- Key people: Walter H. Hoffman (President); James E. Rundell (Vice President)
- Products: Agent Orange, Prist, Pantoplex
- Parent: Syntex Agribusiness

Hoffman-Taff was a Missouri chemical company founded in 1946 most well known for its role in the Times Beach Hazmat Incident. During the years it operated the company produced several products, including Agent Orange for the Vietnam War, Prist, a fuel additive for deicing, and Pantoplex, an animal feed fortifier.

In 1969 Syntex Agribusiness bought the company and its assets.

== Verona, Missouri Production Facility ==
The Verona, Missouri production facility was used by the company for multiple products, however, most notably it was the facility used to produce Agent Orange. In addition part of the facility was leased to NEPACCO for the production of Hexachlorophene, the byproduct of which was mishandled by both NEPACCO and the contractor in charge of disposal, contaminating the facility and Times Beach, Missouri.

Hoffman-Taff built and began operating the site in 1949. In 1968 part of the facility was leased to NEPACCO, and in 1969 the facility and Hoffman-Taff was acquired by Syntex. NEPACCO operated at the site until 1972, when Hexachlorophene was banned by the FDA following a number of deaths attributed to the chemical. In 1983 the EPA placed the site on the Superfund National Priorities List.

As of 2019 the facility has been split in two, the part previously operated by NEPACCO is now owned by BCP Ingredients, with the other now owned by Euticals, Inc. BCP continues to manufacture chemicals using the facility.

== See also ==
- NEPACCO
- Times Beach, Missouri
