= Hamburg, Missouri =

Extinct hamlet in Missouri, U.S.

Coordinates: 38°40′11″N 90°43′54″W

Hamburg was a small town in St. Charles County, Missouri, United States. Hamburg was one of three towns, along with nearby Howell and Toonerville, that were evacuated and terminated in 1940–1941 when the area was taken over by the United States Department of the Army for the Weldon Spring Ordnance Works, which manufactured trinitrotoluene (TNT) and dinitrotoluene (DNT) and later processed uranium.

== History ==
Settled in the 1830s by German immigrants John Nahm, William Koenig, George Mades, Daniel Schmidt, Jacob Schneider and Nickolas Roth, Hamburg was a railroad and river access point and town-center for farm families of the area. The town met its demise in 1941 when the U.S. government purchased the entire area including two other nearby farm communities (Howell and Toonerville) for construction of an ordinance plant to support preparations for World War II. The federal government notified residents in late 1940 of its plan for the plant and by mid-1941 everyone was moved out and the area closed off. Some had negotiated purchase prices and received their payment but others ended up in a long court battle that was not settled until after WWII in the U.S. Supreme Court.

Hamburg (not to be confused with New Hamburg in southeast Missouri) was located along the Missouri River, southwest of St. Charles along Highway 94 in St. Charles County. Nearby farm communities were settled in late 18th century by the Howell and Boone (Daniel Boone and son Daniel Morgan Boone) families. Originally the German settlers of the to-be Hamburg built homes near the Missouri River below and along the bluff, but after flooding the majority of the community moved above the bluff overlooking the river, creating an upper and lower Hamburg.

A few people in the area had participated in the California gold rush and returned to Missouri with enough money to buy farms and start their families. Many served in the Civil War, some on either side, though for the most part German-heritage families supported the Union. A number of settlers moved to the Oklahoma territory during the Land Run of 1889.

== Notable residents ==
John E. Schneider, a coverlet weaver, one of the first west of the Mississippi River with coverlets now both in the Saint Louis Art Museum and the Art Institute of Chicago, was born in 1823 and an early respected citizen of Hamburg. Archie Bowman, locally remembered as one of the last U.S. citizens to die in World War I, lived in Hamburg. Ralph Sutton, a well-known traditional jazz stride pianist, was born in Hamburg in 1922. In the early years of his career during the 1930s, he performed in his father's band at the Riverview Park dance hall in Hamburg. The dance hall was specifically built by his father Earl Sutton and Earl's business partner and friend Theodore (Tot) Mades to encourage Ralph's playing.

== See also ==
- List of ghost towns in Missouri
