= August A. Busch Memorial Conservation Area =

Protected land in Missouri, U.S.

- IUCN category IV (habitat/species management area)
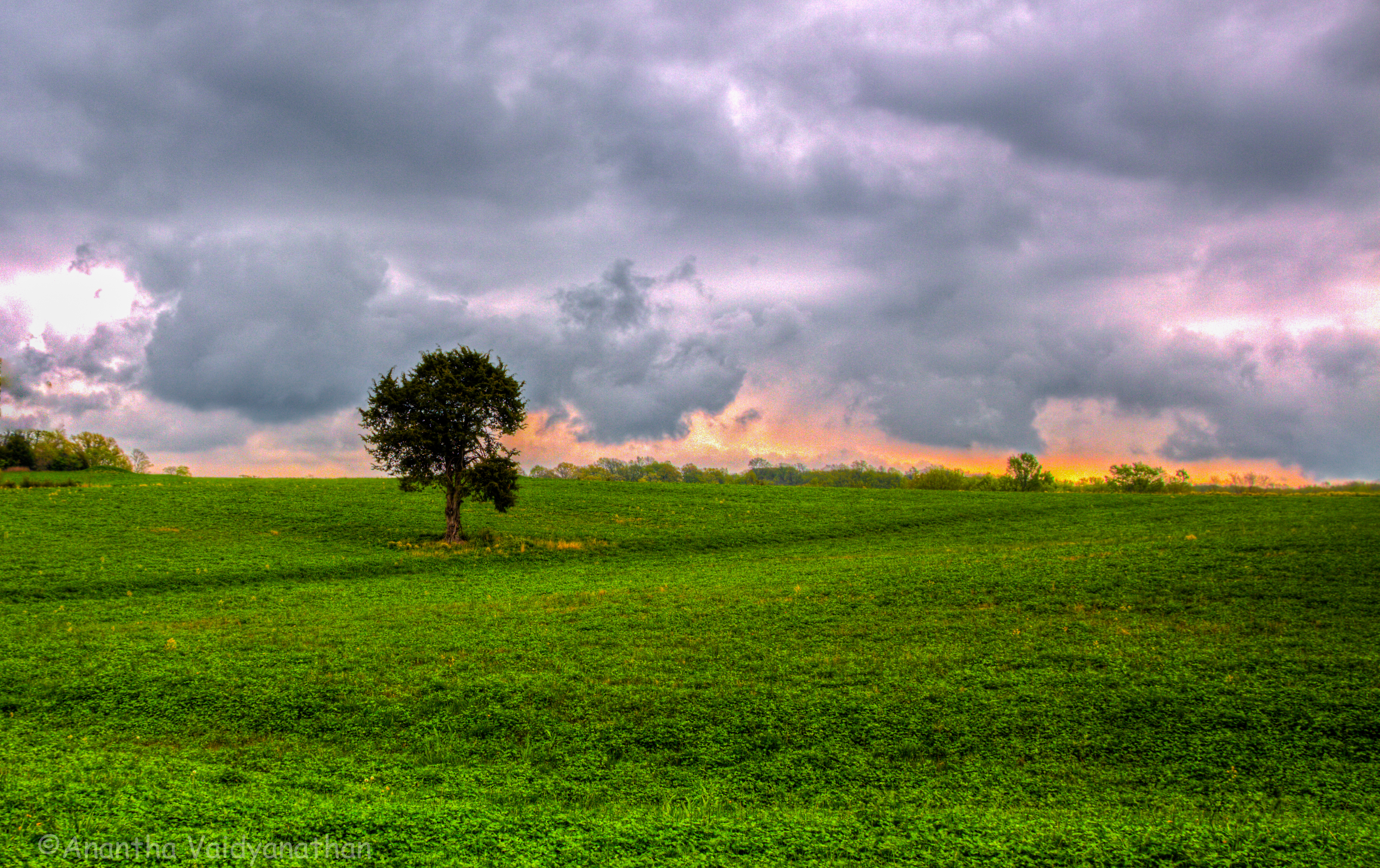
- August A. Busch Memorial Conservation Area, April 2015

- Location within Missouri
- Location: St. Charles County, Missouri, United States
- Nearest city: Weldon Spring, MO
- Coordinates: 38.718333°N 90.755556°W
- Area: 6,987 acres (28.3 km^{2})
- Established: 1947
- Governing body: Missouri Department of Conservation
- Website: Official website

August A. Busch Memorial Conservation Area is a 6,987-acre (28.28 km^{2}) conservation area that is owned and managed by the Missouri Department of Conservation. Located in St. Charles County, Missouri, the land was purchased by the Department of Conservation with help from Alice Busch, the wife of August Anheuser Busch, Sr., in 1947 from the U.S. Government.

== History ==
During the 1940s portions of the area were used by the Weldon Spring Ordnance Works and the Department of the Army for the production of TNT and DNT. There are 100 old bunkers formerly used for the storage of TNT still in the area. The Atomic Energy Commission used the area from 1958 through 1967 for disposal of rubble contaminated by uranium and radium. In 1947 Alice Busch, the wife of August Anheuser Busch, Sr., donated $70,000 towards the cost of purchasing the area to use for conservation purposes as a memorial to her late husband.

Due to its history as a processing facility for DNT and uranium ore, the area is part of a superfund site. It was decontaminated to protect water quality and public health.

== Geography ==
The area has an area of 6,987 acres (28.28 km^{2}), with 2,940 acres (1,190 ha) of forest, 1,000 acres (400 ha) of cropland, 550 acres (220 ha) of lakes and ponds, 80 acres (32 ha) of wetlands, 1,141 acres (462 ha) of old fields, 20 acres (8.1 ha) of roads and parking lots, and 1,200 acres (490 ha) of grasslands, of which 200 acres (81 ha) is restored prairie. There are 32 lakes and ponds open to fishing, 20 fishless ponds, a spring, 8 miles (13 km) of intermittent streams, and 6 mi (9.7 km) of permanent streams.

== Recreation ==
The area provides a wide variety of recreational activities. There is a picnic area, pavilion, visitor center, viewing blind, fishing dock, and boat rentals in the area.

=== Hiking and biking ===
There are several hiking and biking trails in the Conservation Area totaling 7.3 miles (11.7 km). The Busch Hiking and Biking Trail is the area's longest trail at 3.2 miles (5.1 km) and is open to both hiking and biking, as is the 2 mi (3.2 km) long Hamburg Trail. The Fallen Oaks Nature Trail is 0.7 miles (1.1 km) long, has interpretive displays, and is partially handicap accessible. All other trails are less than 0.5 mi (0.80 km) long and open to hiking only.

=== Hunting and fishing ===
Hunting and fishing are permitted in the area given that the appropriate regulations are followed. There are 32 lakes stocked by the Department of Conservation and open to fishing. The lakes are stocked with trout, black bass, catfish, crappie, bluegill, sunfish, and muskellunge. Parts of the area are managed to support dove populations for hunting. According to the Department of Conservation, there are currently no concerns of contamination of the wildlife, from the nearby Superfund site. There is also a shooting range in the area.

=== Handicap accessibility ===
There have been numerous improvements in the park to improve accessibility for wheelchair users. These include ramps, concrete fishing areas, and boardwalks around nature viewing areas.
