= Ark, Missouri =

Extinct hamlet in Missouri, U.S.

Coordinates: 37°40′52″N 91°20′10″W

Ark is a ghost town in Dent County, in the U.S. state of Missouri.

A post office called Ark was established in 1901, and remained in operation until 1915. The community was a shipping point of lumber.

== See also ==
- List of ghost towns in Missouri
