= Calvin Munson =

American football player (born 1994)

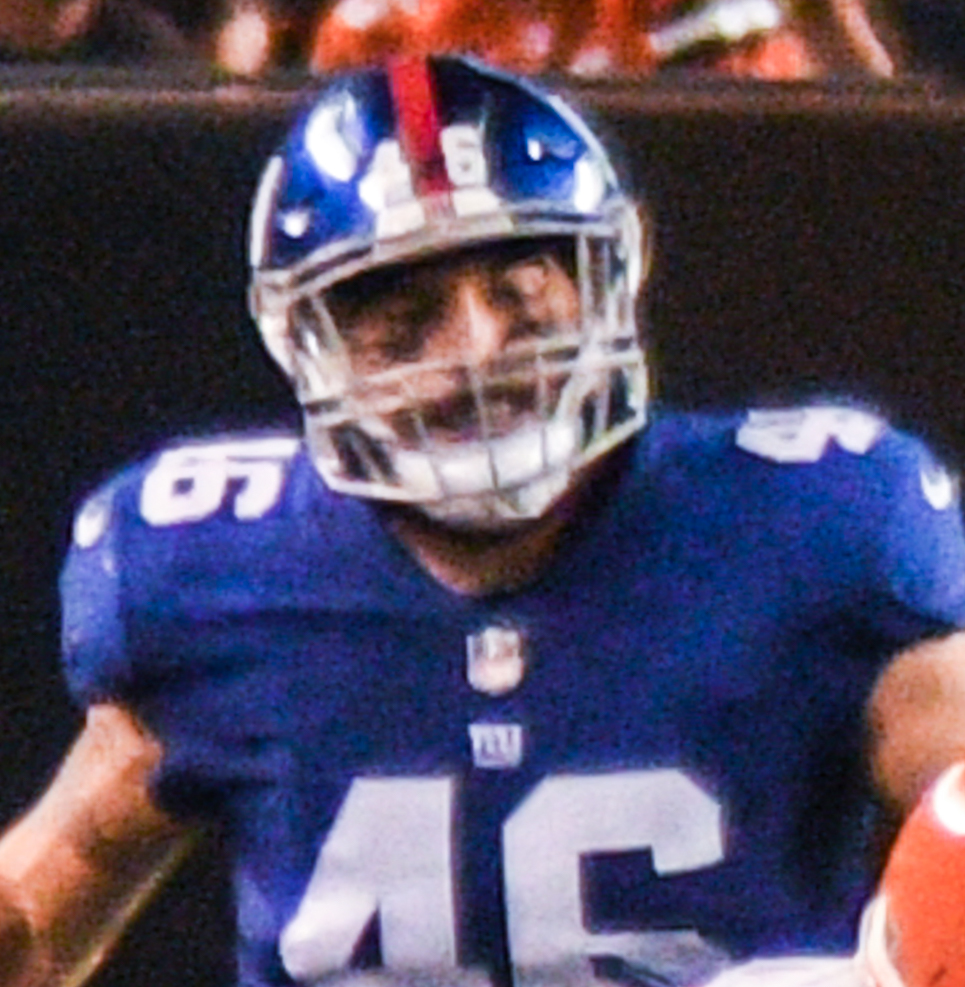
- Munson with the New York Giants in 2017

Profile
- Position: Linebacker

Personal information
- Born: December 27, 1994 (age 31); St. Charles, Missouri, U.S.
- Listed height: 6 ft 1 in (1.85 m)
- Listed weight: 240 lb (109 kg)

Career information
- High school: Francis Howell (St. Charles)
- College: San Diego State (2013–2016)
- NFL draft: 2017: undrafted

Career history
- New York Giants (2017–2018); New England Patriots (2018–2019)*; Miami Dolphins (2019–2021); New England Patriots (2021); Miami Dolphins (2021–2022); New England Patriots (2022–2023); Miami Dolphins (2023); Minnesota Vikings (2024)*
- * Offseason or practice squad member only

Awards and highlights
- Super Bowl champion (LIII); 2× First-team All-Mountain West (2015, 2016)

Career NFL statistics as of 2024
- Total tackles: 89
- Sacks: 2.0
- Forced fumbles: 1
- Stats at Pro Football Reference

Calvin Christopher Munson (born December 27, 1994) is an American professional football linebacker. He played college football for the San Diego State Aztecs, and was signed by the New York Giants as an undrafted free agent in 2017.

== Early life ==
Munson attended Francis Howell High School in St. Charles. There he won First-team All-State, First-team All-District linebacker, and Missouri Defensive Player of the Year. He also played baseball during his time with the Vikings being selected by the St. Louis Cardinals in the 31st round 2013 Major League Baseball draft. He was selected to the ABCA/Rawlings High School All-America Baseball Second Team.

== College career ==
Munson did not sign with the Cardinals, instead attending San Diego State University in order to pursue football. There he was twice selected for the First-team All-Mountain West Conference and was two time San Diego State Aztecs football Outstanding Defensive Player of the Year

=== Statistics ===
Season	GP	Defense				
Season	GP	Cmb	TfL	Sck	Int	FF
2013	3	5	0.0	0.0	0	0
2014	13	82	9.5	3.0	4	2
2015	14	98	15.0	10.5	2	1
2016	14	116	11.0	4.5	1	0
Career	44	301	35.5	18.0	7	3

== Professional career ==
Pre-draft measurables
Height	Weight	Arm length	Hand span	40-yard dash	10-yard split	20-yard split	20-yard shuttle	Three-cone drill	Vertical jump	Broad jump	Bench press
6 ft 0 5/8 in (1.84 m)	241 lb (109 kg)	31 in (0.79 m)	9 1/2 in (0.24 m)	4.79 s	1.68 s	2.72 s	4.39 s	7.20 s	31.5 in (0.80 m)	9 ft 9 in (2.97 m)	25 reps
All values from Pro Day

=== New York Giants ===
Munson signed with the New York Giants as an undrafted free agent following the 2017 NFL draft. He made the Giants 53-man roster, and made his first career start at middle linebacker in Week 2 in place of an injured B. J. Goodson.

On September 1, 2018, Munson was waived by the Giants and was signed to the practice squad the next day. He was released on September 13, 2018.

=== New England Patriots (first stint) ===
On October 8, 2018, Munson was signed to the New England Patriots' practice squad. Munson won Super Bowl LIII when the Patriots defeated the Los Angeles Rams 13–3. He signed a reserve/future contract with the Patriots on February 5, 2019.

On August 31, 2019, Munson was released during final roster cuts. He was signed to the practice squad the next day.

=== Miami Dolphins (first stint) ===
On December 18, 2019, Munson was signed by the Miami Dolphins off the Patriots practice squad.

Munson was placed on the active/non-football injury list by the Dolphins at the start of training camp on July 28, 2020. He was activated on August 9, 2020.

Munson was given an exclusive-rights free agent tender by the Dolphins on March 8, 2021. He signed the one-year contract on April 14. He was waived on August 31, 2021, and re-signed to the practice squad the next day.

=== New England Patriots (second stint) ===
On October 27, 2021, Munson was signed by the Patriots off the Dolphins practice squad. He was waived on December 14.

=== Miami Dolphins (second stint) ===
On December 15, 2021, Munson was claimed off waivers by the Dolphins.

On August 29, 2022, Munson was placed on injured reserve. He was released on October 10.

=== New England Patriots (third stint) ===
On October 12, 2022, Munson was signed to the Patriots practice squad. He signed a reserve/future contract on January 10, 2023.

On August 29, 2023, Munson was waived by the Patriots and re-signed to the practice squad.

=== Miami Dolphins (third stint) ===
On December 9, 2023, Munson was signed by the Dolphins off the Patriots practice squad.

=== Minnesota Vikings ===
On October 21, 2024, Munson was signed to the Minnesota Vikings practice squad.
