= Wila, Missouri =

Extinct hamlet in Missouri, U.S.

Coordinates: 36.616725°N 89.783417°W

Wila is an extinct town in New Madrid County, in the U.S. state of Missouri.

A post office called Wila was established in 1894, and remained in operation until 1898. A variant name was "Wiley". The community derives its name from Wiley Webb, the son of a local merchant.

== See also ==
- List of ghost towns in Missouri
