= Brett Norfleet =

American football player (born 2004)

- Norfleet in 2026

No. 87 – Missouri Tigers
- Position: Tight end
- Class: Senior

Personal information
- Born: June 5, 2004 (age 22)
- Listed height: 6 ft 6 in (1.98 m)
- Listed weight: 255 lb (116 kg)

Career information
- High school: Francis Howell (St. Charles, Missouri)
- College: Missouri (2023–present)

Awards and highlights
- SEC All-Freshman Team (2023)
- Stats at ESPN

Brett Norfleet (born June 5, 2004) is an American college football tight end for the Missouri Tigers.

== Early life ==
Norfleet attended Francis Howell High School, where he played both football and baseball. As a junior, he hauled in 26 receptions for 416 yards and five touchdowns, while also having three sacks. Coming out of high school, Norfleet was rated as a four-star recruit and committed to play college football and baseball for the Missouri Tigers over offers from schools such as Alabama, Arizona State, Arkansas, Auburn, Colorado, Florida State, Iowa State, Kansas, Kansas State, Kentucky, Miami, Michigan, Michigan State, Minnesota, Ohio State, Purdue, Tennessee, Virginia Tech, Washington, West Virginia and USC.

== College career ==
In the 2023 season finale, Norfleet had three receptions for 32 yards and two touchdowns in a win over rival Arkansas. He finished the season with 18 receptions for 198 yards and three touchdowns, earning SEC all-freshman honors. After the season, Norfleet fully committed to playing football and decided not to play baseball for Missouri.
