= Barbara Sutton Curtis =

American jazz pianist (1930–2019)

- Barbara Sutton Curtis, from a 1991 newspaper.
- Born: September 16, 1930; Howell, Missouri
- Died: October 30, 2019 (aged 89); Ukiah, California
- Occupation: Jazz pianist

Barbara Sutton Curtis (September 16, 1930 – October 30, 2019) was an American jazz pianist.

== Early life ==
Barbara Sutton was born in Howell, Missouri, the daughter of Earl Sutton and Edna Sutton. Her older brother Ralph Sutton was also a jazz pianist in the Harlem stride piano style, and with his help she started performing in her teens. She graduated from Lindenwood College in St. Charles, Missouri, in 1952.

== Career ==
Barbara Sutton began playing professionally in St. Louis while she was still in college. In 1959 she played duets with her brother in New York City. The Suttons were both considered important interpreters of the works of Fats Waller, and recovered some lost compositions by Waller. A reviewer praised her "solid left hand" on her 1997 solo album Old Fashioned Love (recorded in Canada in 1987 and 1993). She said of playing jazz, "When the hearts of the musicians are together, it's a real high. There's nothing like it."

She moved to California with her husband in the 1960s. In 1969, Curtis moved to Ukiah, California, where she continued performing for many years, leading the Barbara Curtis Quintet. She also taught piano at Mendocino Community College. She toured with her brother in Germany in 1987, with a Fats Waller tribute show. In 1991 she performed with her brother in Switzerland. Another album of her performances, Solos & Duets, was released in 1993. They recorded another album together in St. Louis in 2000, about a year before Ralph died. Barbara and Hal Curtis were honored with a lifetime achievement award in 2005.

Barbara Sutton Curtis was regularly featured on programs of American jazz festivals, including the 1977 Inverness Music Festival, the 1988 DuMaurier Downtown Jazz Festival in Toronto, the 1991 Mid America Jazz Festival in St. Louis, the Peninsula Jazz Party in Menlo Park, California, the Sacramento Traditional Jazz Festival, the Fats Waller Memorial Jazz Festival, and the Santa Rosa Dixieland Jazz Festival.

== Recordings ==
- Long Overdue with the Barbara Curtis Quartet (1984)
- Solos and Duets (Sackville Records 1993)
- Old Fashioned Love (Sackville Records 1997)
- Home Again (Gaslight Records 2001), with Ralph Sutton

== Personal life ==
Barbara Sutton married drummer and schoolteacher Harold "Hal" Curtis in 1952. They had a daughter, Terry, and a son, Scott. She died in 2019, aged 89 years, in Ukiah. Unpublished recordings of her concerts were donated to the Mendocino County Historical Society.
