= Weldon Spring Ordnance Works =

Government-owner facility in Missouri, US

Coordinates: 38°41′45″N 90°44′48″W

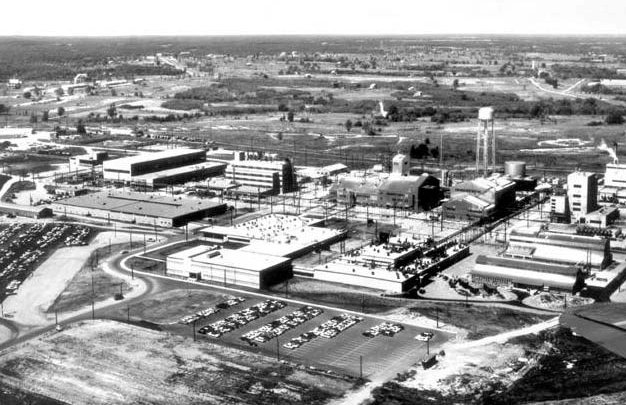
Weldon Spring Chemical Plant

Weldon Spring Ordnance Works (WSOW) was a 17,323-acre (70.10 km^{2}) U.S. Government-owned, contractor-operated (GOCO) facility in St. Charles County, Missouri, 55 km west of St. Louis. The site was originally operated by the Atlas Powder Company during World War II from 1941 to 1945 to produce explosives. The Atomic Energy Commission acquired part of the property in 1955, and Mallinckrodt, Inc. processed uranium ore from 1957 to 1966 under contract. The site has been divided into several parcels, and ownership has transferred over the years. Two portions of the original WSOW property are now Superfund sites that require substantial cleanup efforts. The environmental remediation of the WSOW site is currently designated as a major project of the Defense Environmental Restoration Program of the United States Department of Defense. Part of the original property is still used by the Army Reserve as the Weldon Spring Training Area.

== Weldon Spring Ordnance Works ==
The site was purchased in 1940, totaling 17,232 acres (6,974 ha) of largely rural land. The towns of Hamburg, Howell, and Toonerville and around 700 citizens of the area were displaced beginning in 1940 and ending the following year. From 1941 to 1945, the Atlas Powder Company manufactured trinitrotoluene (TNT) and dinitrotoluene (DNT) at the site. Four TNT and two DNT production lines were situated on what was to be the Chemical Plant. These operations resulted in nitroaromatic contamination of soil, sediments, and some off-site springs. After World War II, over 15,000 acres (61 km^{2}) were transferred to the State of Missouri, including the 6,987-acre (28.28 km^{2}) August A. Busch Memorial Conservation Area. Additional land was transferred to the University of Missouri, St. Charles County, and the Francis Howell School District. Much of the land that was transferred to the University of Missouri has become the 8,398-acre (33.99 km^{2}) Weldon Spring Conservation Area.

== Weldon Spring Chemical Plant ==
Following a considerable amount of environmental remediation of the facility by the U.S. Army and the Atlas Powder Company, 205 acres (83 ha) of the former ordnance works were transferred to the United States Atomic Energy Commission (AEC) in 1955 for construction of the Weldon Spring Uranium Feed Materials Plant, now referred to as the Weldon Spring Chemical Plant. Mallinckrodt, Inc. operated the plant from 1957 to 1966 under a contract with the AEC. An additional 14.88 acres (6.02 ha) were transferred to the AEC in 1964. The plant converted processed uranium ore concentrates to uranium tetrafluoride, uranium trioxide, intermediate compounds, and uranium metal. A small amount of thorium was also processed. Wastes generated during these operations were stored in four raffinate pits located on the plant property. Uranium processing operations resulted in radiological contamination of the area.

Uranium processing operations ceased in 1966, and on December 31, 1967, the AEC returned the facility to the Army for use as a defoliant production plant. The defoliant project was canceled before any process equipment was installed, and the Army transferred 50.65 acres (20.50 ha) of land encompassing the raffinate pits back to the AEC while retaining the Chemical Plant. The AEC, and subsequently the United States Department of Energy (DOE), managed the site, including the Army-owned Chemical Plant, under caretaker status from 1968 through 1985. In 1984, the Army repaired several of the buildings at the Chemical Plant, decontaminated some of the floors, walls, and ceilings, and isolated some equipment. In 1985, the Army transferred full custody of the Chemical Plant to the United States Department of Energy (DOE), at which time the DOE designated control and decontamination of the Chemical Plant, raffinate pits, and Quarry as a major project. The DOE legacy management web site has additional documentation on the status of the site.

== Weldon Spring Quarry ==
The Weldon Spring Quarry was mined for limestone aggregate used in construction of the ordnance works. The Army also used the quarry for burning wastes from explosives manufacturing and disposal of TNT-contaminated rubble during operation of the ordnance works. These activities resulted in contamination of the soil and groundwater at the quarry.

In 1958, the Army transferred the Weldon Spring Quarry to the Atomic Energy Commission, who used it from 1959 to 1966 as a disposal area for uranium, thorium, and radium residues from the Chemical Plant (both drummed and uncontained) and for disposal of contaminated building rubble, process equipment, and soils from demolition of a uranium processing facility in St. Louis. Radiological contamination occurred in the same locations as the nitroaromatic contamination.

== Weldon Spring Training Area ==
By 1959, with the majority of the site already transferred out of government hands, 1,655 acres (6.70 km^{2}) was redeveloped as for the U.S. Army Reserve as the Weldon Spring Training Area.

== Superfund sites ==
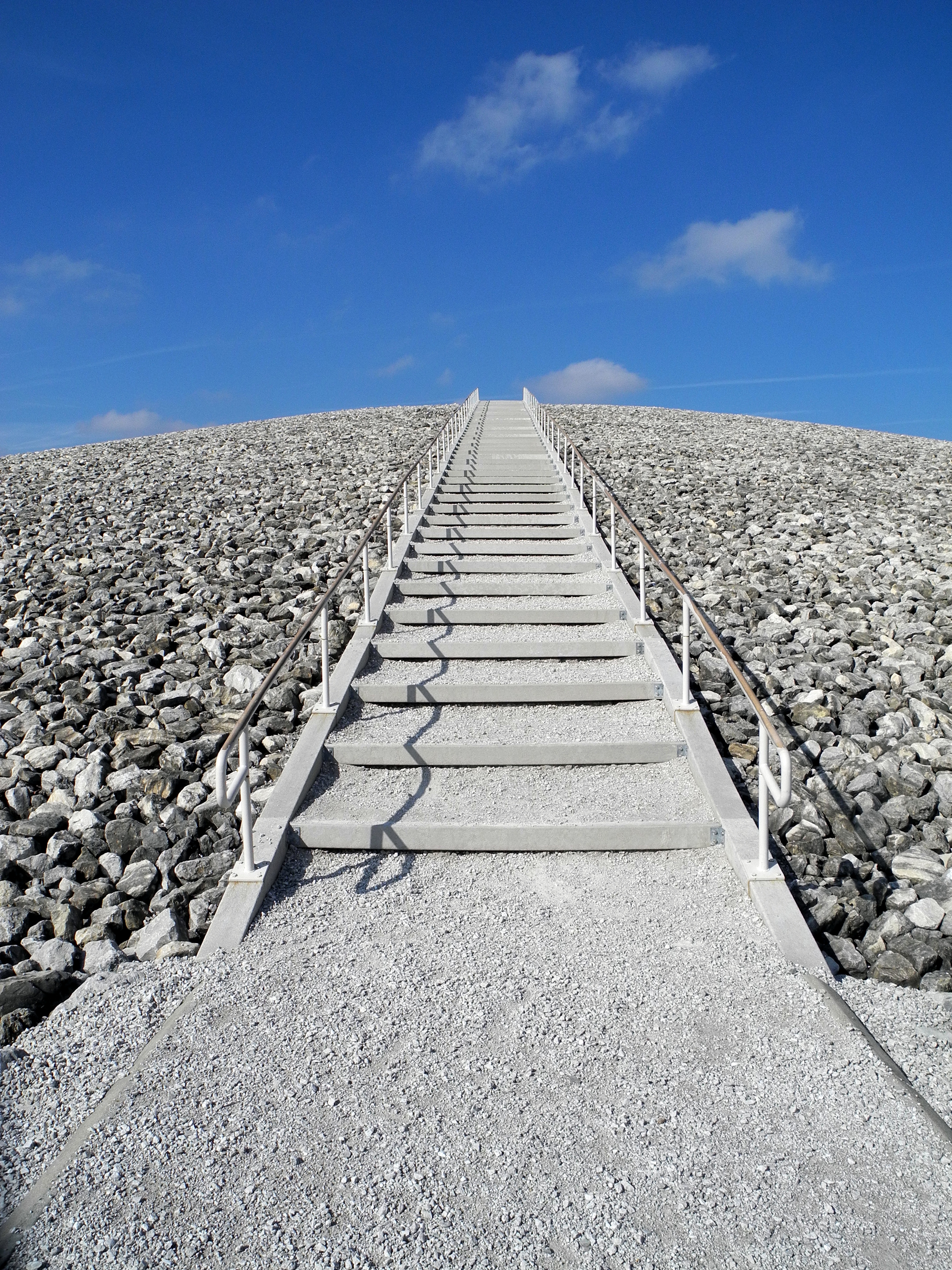
The stairway to an observation platform atop the 75-foot-tall (23 m) permanent disposal cell at the Weldon Spring cleanup site is open to the public.

=== Weldon Spring Quarry/Plant/Pits (USDOE/Army) site ===
On October 15, 1984, the United States Environmental Protection Agency proposed listing the portions of the Weldon Spring area contaminated with radioactive waste on the National Priorities List. The site was finally listed on July 22, 1987. The Weldon Spring Quarry/Plant/Pits (USDOE/Army) site covers 230 acres (0.93 km^{2}) and is located between the Missouri and Mississippi Rivers. The site includes the 51-acre (0.21 km^{2}) disposal area, the 169-acre (0.68 km^{2}) abandoned Uranium Feed Materials Plant, various smaller properties, and the 9-acre (0.036 km^{2}) former limestone quarry located 4 miles from the plant. Primary contaminants of concern at the Chemical Plant and surrounding soil include uranium, thorium, radium, and their radioactive decay products. The quarry contains materials contaminated with TNT and DNT residues, as well as uranium, thorium, and radium residues and contaminated materials and equipment. The quarry is located .75 miles (1.21 km) from the St. Charles County well field, which is used as a drinking water source for approximately 70,000 people.

=== Weldon Spring Former Army Ordnance Works site ===
On July 14, 1989, the United States Environmental Protection Agency proposed adding the Weldon Spring Ordnance Works to the National Priorities List. The site was officially listed on February 21, 1990. Contaminated areas are spread throughout the site, with the greatest concentration in the Training Area. Areas of concern include seven unlined lagoons where TNT wastewater was stored, TNT production lines, two DNT production lines, drainage ditches below TNT production lines, and eight areas where explosive wastes were burned. The primary contaminants of concern at the site are TNT, DNT, and lead. These contaminants have been identified in soil at several areas on the site, and TNT was detected in 1987 in surface water downstream of the lagoons.

Portions of the August A. Busch Memorial Conservation Area are within the Weldon Spring Former Army Ordnance Works site.

== See also ==
- List of Superfund sites in Missouri
