= NEPACCO =

Chemical company involved in the Times Beach Hazmat Incident

North Eastern Pharmaceutical & Chemical Co., Inc
- Company type: Private
- Industry: Chemicals
- Founded: November 4, 1966; 59 years ago in Delaware, United States
- Defunct: August 22, 1976
- Fate: Shutdown for failure to maintain an agent for service of process
- Headquarters: Stamford, United States
- Area served: United States
- Key people: Edwin Michaels (President); John W. Lee (Vice President)
- Products: Hexachlorophene

NEPACCO, or the "North Eastern Pharmaceuticals and Chemicals Co" was a pharmaceutical and chemical company founded in 1966 in Stamford, Connecticut, best known for its role in the Times Beach Hazmat Incident.

NEPACCO's main product was hexachlorophene, which it began producing after leasing a Verona, Missouri based chemical production facility from Hoffman-Taff in 1969. As a byproduct of this process, dioxin, most well known for its use in Agent Orange during the Vietnam War, was created. Although the dioxin was initially held on site, it was eventually improperly disposed of in a trench in the facility, and by a local waste handler, Russell Bliss.

Following the ban of Hexachlorophene in 1972, NEPACCO halted production on the site. By 1974, the company had liquidated all its assets, and was shut down by the Delaware Secretary of State in 1976.

Edwin Michaels and John W. Lee, the President and Vice President of NEPACCO, and Ronald Mills, shift Supervisor, were personally liable for their actions in the Times Beach dioxin case.
