= Cookville, Missouri =

Unincorporated community in Missouri, U.S.

Coordinates: 37°38′56″N 92°12′36″W

Cookville is an extinct town in southwestern Pulaski County, in the U.S. state of Missouri. The GNIS classifies it as a populated place. The town site is along Roubidoux Creek within the southern part of Fort Leonard Wood. The community of Greenview is located two miles to the west on Missouri Route 17 along the western boundary of the military reservation and adjacent to the Pulaski-Laclede county line.

A post office called Cookville was established in 1878, and remained in operation until 1941. The community has the name of W. J. Cook, a local merchant.

== See also ==
- List of ghost towns in Missouri
