= Holman, Missouri =

Extinct hamlet in Missouri, U.S.

Coordinates: 37°16′23″N 93°03′12″W

Holman is an extinct town in Webster County, in the U.S. state of Missouri. The GNIS classifies it as a populated place. The site is located on Missouri Supplemental Route OO, approximately fifteen miles (24 km) northeast of Springfield.

A post office called Holman was established in 1903, and remained in operation until 1911. The community once had Holman Schoolhouse, now defunct. The school had the name of the Holman family of settlers.

== See also ==
- List of ghost towns in Missouri
