= Weldon Spring Heights, Missouri =

- Village
- Location of Weldon Spring Heights, Missouri
- Coordinates: 38°42′19″N 90°41′10″W
- Country: United States
- State: Missouri
- County: St. Charles

Area
  - Total: 0.097 sq mi (0.25 km^{2})
  - Land: 0.097 sq mi (0.25 km^{2})
  - Water: 0 sq mi (0.00 km^{2})
- Elevation: 617 ft (188 m)

Population (2020)
  - Total: 93
  - Density: 966.6/sq mi (373.21/km^{2})
- Time zone: UTC-6 (Central (CST))
  - Summer (DST): UTC-5 (CDT)
- FIPS code: 29-78334
- GNIS feature ID: 0756884

Weldon Spring Heights is a small village in St. Charles County, Missouri, United States, approximately 30 miles west of St. Louis. According to the 2020 census, the population was 93.

== Geography ==
Weldon Spring Heights is located approximately 30 miles west of St. Louis and accessible via Missouri State Route 94.

The United States Census Bureau reports the village has a total area of 0.09 square miles (0.23 km^{2}) all of which is land.

== History ==
Homes in the current Town of Weldon Spring Heights were built in 1941-1943 as executive housing for senior employees of the Atlas Powder Company and U.S. Army officers that worked at the Weldon Spring Ordnance Works (WSOW). A total of 30 homes were built, six being Type 1 and 24 being Type 2. Following World War II in 1945, the homes settled into disrepair since the government was no longer operating the Ordnance Works but still owned the property. In 1949, the land was sold to Kansas City lawyer Joseph Koralchik, who established The Town of Weldon Spring Heights on 20 December 1949.

== Demographics ==
Historical population
Census	Pop.	Note	%±
1970	172		—
1980	144		−16.3%
1990	82		−43.1%
2000	79		−3.7%
2010	91		15.2%
2020	93		2.2%
U.S. Decennial Census

=== 2010 census ===
As per the census of 2010, the village had a population of 91, consisting of 35 households and 33 families. The population density was 1,011.1 inhabitants per square mile (390.4/km^{2}), with 36 housing units averaging a density of 400.0 per square mile (154.4/km^{2}). The racial makeup of the village was predominantly White at 89.0%, with 9.9% from other races, and 1.1% identifying with two or more races. Hispanic or Latino of any race accounted for 9.9% of the population.

In 2010, 22.9% of households had children under 18, 80.0% were married couples living together, 5.7% had a female householder with no husband present, 8.6% had a male householder with no wife present, and 5.7% were non-families. Individuals made up 2.9% of all households, with an equal percentage having a resident who was 65 or older living alone. The average household size was 2.60, with the average family size being 2.64.

The median age in the village was 55.5 years, with 15.4% of residents under 18; 7.7% between 18 and 24; 3.3% between 25 and 44; 40.7% between 45 and 64; and 33% aged 65 or older. The gender makeup of the village was 54.9% male and 45.1% female.

=== 2000 census ===
The census of 2000 reported 79 residents, consisting of 32 households, and 27 families in the town. The population density was 880.5 inhabitants per square mile (340.0/km^{2}). There were 32 housing units at an average density of 356.7 per square mile (137.7/km^{2}). The racial makeup of the town was 100.00% White. Hispanic or Latino of any race were 2.53% of the population.

In 2000, 21.9% of households had children under the age of 18 living with them, 75.0% were married couples living together, 6.3% had a female householder with no husband present, and 15.6% were non-families. Individual residents made up 12.5% of all households, with 9.4% of households consisting of someone living alone who was 65 years of age or older. The average household size was 2.47 and the average family size was 2.67. The population was spread out, with 20.3% under the age of 18, 3.8% from 18 to 24, 20.3% from 25 to 44, 34.2% from 45 to 64, and 21.5% who were 65 years of age or older. The median age was 46 years. For every 100 females, there were 107.9 males. For every 100 females age 18 and over, there were 103.2 males.

The median income for a household in the town was $60,625, with a median income of $78,644 for a family. Males had a median income of $38,750 versus $43,750 for females. The per capita income for the town was $25,627. No families and 4.9% of the population lived below the poverty line, including no one under eighteen, and 8.0% of those over 64.

== Education ==
It is in the Francis Howell R-III School District.
