= Times Beach, Missouri =

Times Beach
- Ghost town
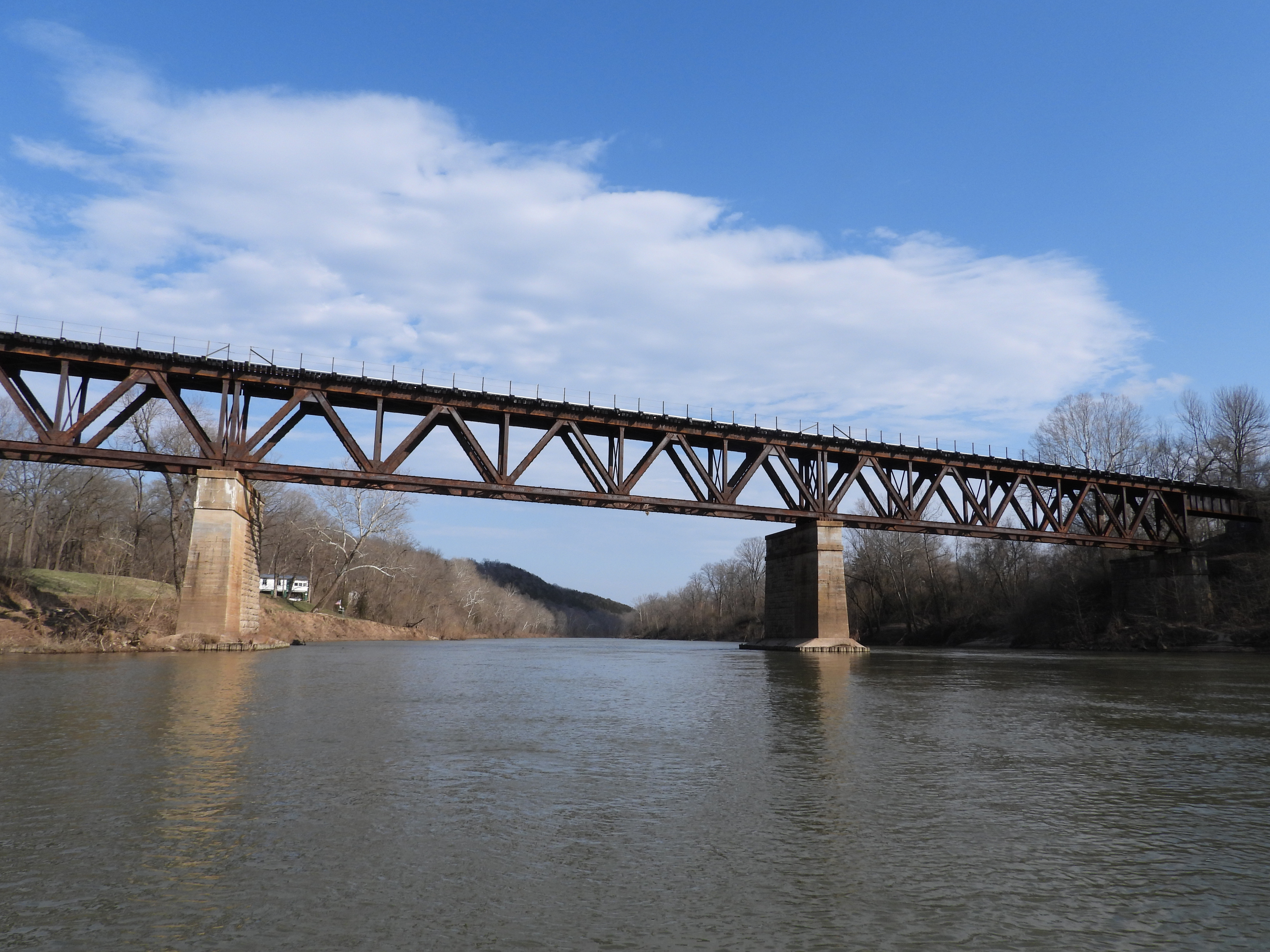
- Times Beach Bridge in 2022

- Location in Missouri Times Beach (the United States)
- Coordinates: 38°30′31″N 90°36′09″W
- Country: United States
- State: Missouri
- County: St. Louis
- Founded: 1925
- Dis-incorporated: 1985
- Elevation: 436 ft (133 m)
- Postal code: 63025

Times Beach is a ghost town in St. Louis County, Missouri, United States, 17 miles (27 km) southwest of St. Louis and 2 miles (3 km) east of Eureka. Once home to more than two thousand people, the town was completely evacuated in early 1983 due to TCDD (a type of dioxin) contamination, formerly the largest civilian exposure to the compound in the history of the United States.

In 1985, the State of Missouri officially disincorporated the city of Times Beach. The site of Times Beach now houses a 419-acre (170 ha) state park which opened in 1999. The park commemorates U.S. Route 66 (US 66), as well as the history of the Times Beach area. The famous US 66 that stretched from Chicago, Illinois, to Santa Monica, California passed through the community on its southern end. In 2001, the EPA removed Times Beach from its Superfund list.

== History ==
Historical population
Census	Pop.	Note	%±
1960	986		—
1970	1,265		28.3%
1980	2,041		61.3%
Missouri Census Data Center

Times Beach was founded in 1925 on the flood plain of the Meramec River, southwest of the river, as a promotion by the now-defunct St. Louis Star-Times newspaper. A six-month newspaper subscription, costing US$67.50 (equivalent to $1,239 in 2025), included a 20-by-100-foot (6.1 by 30.5 m) lot on a tract of former farmland.

In its early years, the town was primarily a summer resort, but the Great Depression combined with gasoline rationing during World War II reduced the feasibility of summer homes. The town became a community of mostly low-income housing, and a small population (1,240) lived in Times Beach by 1970. In the years immediately before its evacuation, Times Beach had become a lower-middle-class town.

Times Beach was prone to flooding throughout its history, and its first buildings were built on stilts. It experienced a devastating flood in December 1982. This happened just as the Environmental Protection Agency (EPA) confirmed that dioxin had contaminated the soil, which led to the town's evacuation by 1985 and complete demolition by 1992. The town was disincorporated by executive order of the Missouri governor, John Ashcroft, on April 2, 1985.

== Dioxin contamination ==
=== Events leading up to the crisis ===
==== NEPACCO chemical waste disposal ====
During the late 1960s, the Northeastern Pharmaceutical and Chemical Company, Inc. (NEPACCO) began operating out of a facility located near Verona, in southwestern Missouri. This facility was owned by Hoffman-Taff, a company that produced the Agent Orange herbicide for use during the Vietnam War. By the time NEPACCO ceased its operations in 1972, Hoffman-Taff had been taken over by Syntex Agribusiness.

From 1970 to 1972, NEPACCO was primarily involved in the production of hexachlorophene (3), an antibacterial agent used in soap, toothpaste, and common household disinfectants, from 2,4,5-trichlorophenol (1) and formaldehyde (2).

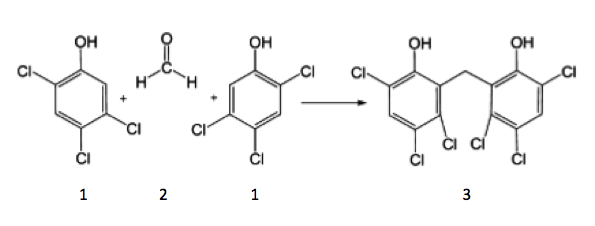

2,4,5-trichlorophenol is synthesized from 1,2,4,5-tetrachlorobenzene by the nucleophilic aromatic substitution reaction with sodium hydroxide (NaOH). Unfortunately, instantaneous dimerization of the resulting phenol produces trace amounts of 2,3,7,8-tetrachlorodibenzo-p-dioxin (TCDD), an extremely toxic compound known to have both acute and chronic adverse effects.

Beginning the process of production with 2,4,5-trichlorophenol that contained 3–5 parts per million (ppm) of dioxin, NEPACCO was able to reduce the concentration of dioxin in hexachlorophene to 0.1 ppm. The result of this purification process led to the storage and accumulation of heavily concentrated dioxin still bottoms, or thick, oily residues, in a storage tank located near the facility in Verona. When NEPACCO first began operations, the still bottoms were sent to a waste facility in Louisiana for incineration. Although incineration was the best method to destroy dioxins at the time, it was also very expensive. Looking for less costly alternatives, NEPACCO contracted the services of the Independent Petrochemical Corporation (IPC).

Between February and October 1971, waste oil hauler Russell Bliss collected six truckloads (nearly 18,500 US gallons (70,000 L; 15,400 imp gal)) of chemical waste heavily contaminated with dioxin. Bliss took most of the still bottoms to his storage facility near Frontenac, Missouri, where the contaminated NEPACCO waste was unloaded and mixed into tanks containing used motor oils. Subsequently, some of the contaminated oil was sold to MT Richards, a fuel company in Illinois, and to the Midwest Oil Refining Company in Overland, Missouri.

==== First cases of contamination ====
In addition to his waste oil business, Bliss owned a horse arena and farm, where he sprayed waste oils to control nuisance dust. One application controlled the dust for several months. Those who visited Bliss' property were impressed by how well the technique worked. It was not long before people began to hire him for his dust-suppressant services.

On May 26, 1971, the owners of Shenandoah Stable, located near Moscow Mills, Missouri, Judy Piatt and Frank Hampel, paid Bliss $150 to spray the floor of their indoor arena. The waste oil sprayed, which totaled a volume of 2,000 gallons, was uncharacteristically thick, and left a pungent, burning odor. Within a few days of the spraying, birds began to drop dead from the rafters of the barns, and horses began to develop sores and lose their hair. Piatt and Hampel blamed these occurrences on Bliss, who denied responsibility, claiming that the material he sprayed was nothing more than old motor oil.

Acting on their suspicions, Piatt and Hampel removed the top six inches of soil from the entire arena and disposed of it in a landfill. Despite the removal of another 12 inches of soil a few months later, horses that came to the arena became ill. After several months, 62 horses died or became so emaciated that they had to be euthanized. Hampel, Piatt, and Piatt's two young daughters also became ill, developing headaches, nosebleeds, abdominal pain, and diarrhea.

A month after the spraying at Shenandoah, Bliss was hired to spray the arena at Timberline Stables, near Jefferson City, Missouri. Twelve horses died, and children exposed to the arena were diagnosed with chloracne, a skin condition associated with dioxin poisoning. Suspecting that Bliss' oil was the source of their problems, the owners of Timberline removed the top layer of soil from their property.

A third arena, at Bubbling Springs Ranch, near St. Louis, was also sprayed around the same time as Timberline and faced similar problems. As at Shenandoah and Timberline, the owners decided to remove the top layer of soil from their arena. Vernon Stout, a road-grading contractor, completed the removal in March 1973. Instead of bringing the soil to a landfill, Stout unloaded the soil onto one of his properties and at the nearby home of Harold Minker.

==== CDC investigations ====
The unexplained deaths and illnesses at Shenandoah immediately caught the attention of the Centers for Disease Control and Prevention (CDC). In August 1971, the CDC completed an inspection of Shenandoah Stable, and collected human and animal blood samples, as well as soil samples. Although initial results revealed that the soil at Shenandoah Stable contained PCBs and chlorinated insecticides, the CDC was unable to identify a specific chemical culprit. It was not until 1973 that tests revealed the presence of trichlorophenol. When trace amounts of the crude trichlorophenol contaminant were administered to the inner surfaces of rabbit ears, blisters developed, which was a characteristic result of trichlorophenol poisoning. The unexpected death of some of the affected rabbits, however, led the CDC to run more complex tests.

On July 30, 1974, the CDC found that, in addition to 5,000 ppm of trichlorophenol and 1,590 ppm of PCBs, the soil samples collected from Shenandoah contained over 30 ppm of dioxin. Although little was known about the effects of dioxin on humans, the lethality of small doses in animals was alarming. As a result, the CDC immediately set out to locate other possible sites of contamination. When confronted by the CDC, Bliss stated that he did not know where the dioxin could have come from.

Because dioxin was a by-product of only a handful of chemicals, trichlorophenol being the most common, the CDC narrowed their search to companies in Missouri using or producing trichlorophenol. NEPACCO was the only company on the search list that had come into contact with Bliss.

NEPACCO went out of business in 1972, after the Food and Drug Administration (FDA) had issued a ban that limited the use of hexachlorophene. The ban was motivated by the death of thirty-two infants in France who were exposed to high levels of hexachlorophene in baby powder. During an inspection of the old NEPACCO facility in Verona, which was now entirely owned by Syntex Agribusiness, the CDC discovered an old tank filled with 4,300 gallons of NEPACCO still bottoms at a dioxin concentration of more than 340 ppm. Due to a lack of incinerators in proximity to the Verona plant, the proper disposal of the leftover still bottoms would not be completed until 1979.

With further investigation of contaminated locations, the CDC advised residents of the Minker and Stout properties to minimize contact with the soil. Soil samples had revealed a dioxin concentration of 0.85 ppm at Minker's property, and a concentration of 0.44 ppm at Stout's property. In a 1975 confidential report to the Environmental Protection Agency (EPA), the CDC also further advised the removal and burial of contaminated soil from both properties. In the same document, however, the CDC reported that the half-life of dioxin was one year. Based on this estimate, which was later found to be incorrect, Missouri officials decided to forgo the recommended cleanup. Today, the half-life of dioxin is estimated to be seven to eleven years.

==== Involvement of the EPA ====
The EPA did not become heavily involved with the Missouri dioxin contaminations until 1979 when a former NEPACCO employee reported the burial of toxic waste on a farm located about seven miles from Verona. NEPACCO had paid James Denney, the owner of the farm, $150 for the use of his property. Under the investigations of the EPA, a total of 90 drums, all of which were corroded and leaky, were unearthed. Eleven of these drums contained still bottoms with dioxin concentrations as high as 2,000 ppm.

In May and June 1982, the EPA decided to revisit the Shenandoah, Timberline, and Bubbling Springs stables, as well as the Minker and Stout properties. New soil samples revealed that concentrations of dioxin had not decreased since the last test results obtained by the CDC several years earlier. Although eleven years had passed since the spraying, areas in the Shenandoah arena still contained as much as 1.8 ppm of dioxin. Regional EPA officials advised owners of the contaminated stables to temporarily close and urged the national EPA office to begin cleanup operations at each of the contaminated locations. These cleanup requests were delayed when Rita Lavelle, an assistant administrator at EPA headquarters in Washington, announced that the EPA would be collecting and testing an additional 600 soil samples in order to better understand the extent of contamination.

The EPA's handling of the events in Missouri caught national attention in late 1982 when the Environmental Defense Fund, a public interest group, published a leaked EPA document that listed a total of 14 confirmed and 41 possibly contaminated sites in the state of Missouri. The town of Times Beach was one of the locations listed. The Environmental Defense Fund also claimed that the EPA had decided to lower dioxin cleanup protocol standards. Although the CDC advised for cleanups in locations where dioxin levels were as low as 0.001 ppm, the Environmental Defense Fund report suggested that new EPA protocols would only necessitate clean up in locations where dioxin concentrations were above 0.1 ppm, which is 100 times the CDC recommended threshold.

=== Crisis at Times Beach ===
==== Double disaster ====
In 1972, Times Beach hired Bliss to oil its 23 miles of dirt roads (due to lack of funding, Times Beach was unable to pave its roads). For $2,400, Bliss sprayed approximately 160,000 gallons of waste oil in Times Beach over a period of four years. The release of the leaked EPA document in 1982 was the first time that Times Beach had learned of its contamination. Residents felt betrayed and publicly criticized the EPA for not informing them of the toxic hazards around their homes. The uproar became the subject of national media attention.

With pressure from the public, the EPA soon began an investigation of Times Beach. Soil sampling was fortuitously completed on December 3, 1982, a day before Times Beach suffered its worst flood in history when the Meramec River breached its banks and rose over 14 feet above flood stage. The residents of Times Beach were evacuated, and by the time the waters began to recede, the EPA had concluded its analysis. Results revealed dioxin concentrations as high as 0.3 ppm along the town's entire network of roads.

==== Buyout and cleanup efforts ====
On December 23, 1982, the CDC publicly recommended that Times Beach not be re-inhabited. Officials were uncertain about the health effects of extensive dioxin exposure and even more uncertain of how to rid an entire town of dioxin. Because the town was situated on a flood plain, officials were further concerned that subsequent flooding would spread the contamination beyond control.

Discussions of a federal buyout commenced on January 7, 1983, when President Ronald Reagan created the Times Beach Dioxin Task Force, which consisted of representatives from the EPA, CDC, Federal Emergency Management Agency (FEMA), and Army Corps of Engineers. During a press conference on February 22, 1983, the EPA announced that the federal government would pay $33.0 million of the estimated $36.7 million cost to buy out the 800 residential properties and 30 businesses of Times Beach. The remaining $3.7 million would be the responsibility of the state.

By 1985, Times Beach's entire population of well over 2,000 residents had been relocated, and Governor John Ashcroft had issued an executive order for the town's dis-incorporation.

After evacuation, Times Beach was the logical choice for the placement of a new incinerator. The construction of the incinerator began in June 1995. Once built, it burned more than 265,000 tons of dioxin-contaminated materials from across the state. The cleanup of Missouri was completed in 1997 and had cost close to $200 million.

=== Legal action and responsibility ===
In response to the events that transpired in Missouri during the 1970s, a number of laws were passed to regulate the generation and disposal of potentially hazardous products. In 1976, Congress passed the Toxic Substances Control Act (TSCA), which required the testing of chemicals that could pose an unreasonable risk to the environment. In 1976, Congress also passed the Resource Conservation and Recovery Act (RCRA), which regulated the transportation and disposal of hazardous waste. In 1980, the passage of the Comprehensive Environmental Response, Compensation, and Liability Act (CERCLA) established a multibillion-dollar Superfund to investigate and clean up old, abandoned hazardous waste sites.

The passage of CERCLA also defined the liability of a company and ensured that parties responsible for the release of toxic substances are held liable in the case of environmental damage or harm. In 1983, the federal government sued NEPACCO and its officers, Edwin Michaels and John W. Lee, in United States v. Northeastern Pharmaceutical and Chemical Co.. Under the provisions of CERCLA, NEPACCO was forced to repay the federal government for its cleanup efforts at the farm of James Denney, the site where NEPACCO had buried ninety drums of its chemical waste over a decade earlier.

Because the RCRA was not implemented until 1976, Bliss was not legally required to keep records of the chemical wastes he had collected from NEPACCO. During investigations surrounding the dioxin contamination in Missouri, Bliss maintained that he had no knowledge of the presence of dioxin in the chemical waste he collected from NEPACCO. Still, Bliss was the object of many legal pursuits. Over 14,000 citizens' suits were filed against NEPACCO and its officers, Syntex Agribusiness, IPC, and Bliss. Among these were the cases of Piatt and Hample, who in 1976 settled their suit against Bliss for $10,000 and against IPC for $100,000. In 1981, Piatt and Hample also settled for $65,000 from NEPACCO. IPC paid $1 million to each of Piatt's daughters in 1983.

=== Consequences of the contamination ===
Although the decision for relocation in 1982 was made in the best interests and safety of the Times Beach residents, the evacuation was not an easy transition. Eight hundred families had to leave their lives completely behind. Initially, parents worried about what to do and where to go for financial assistance. As they began to settle into their new lives, their logistical and financial worries were soon replaced by the fear that their children would be afflicted by sudden chronic illnesses. The psychological trauma caused by relocation was immeasurable.

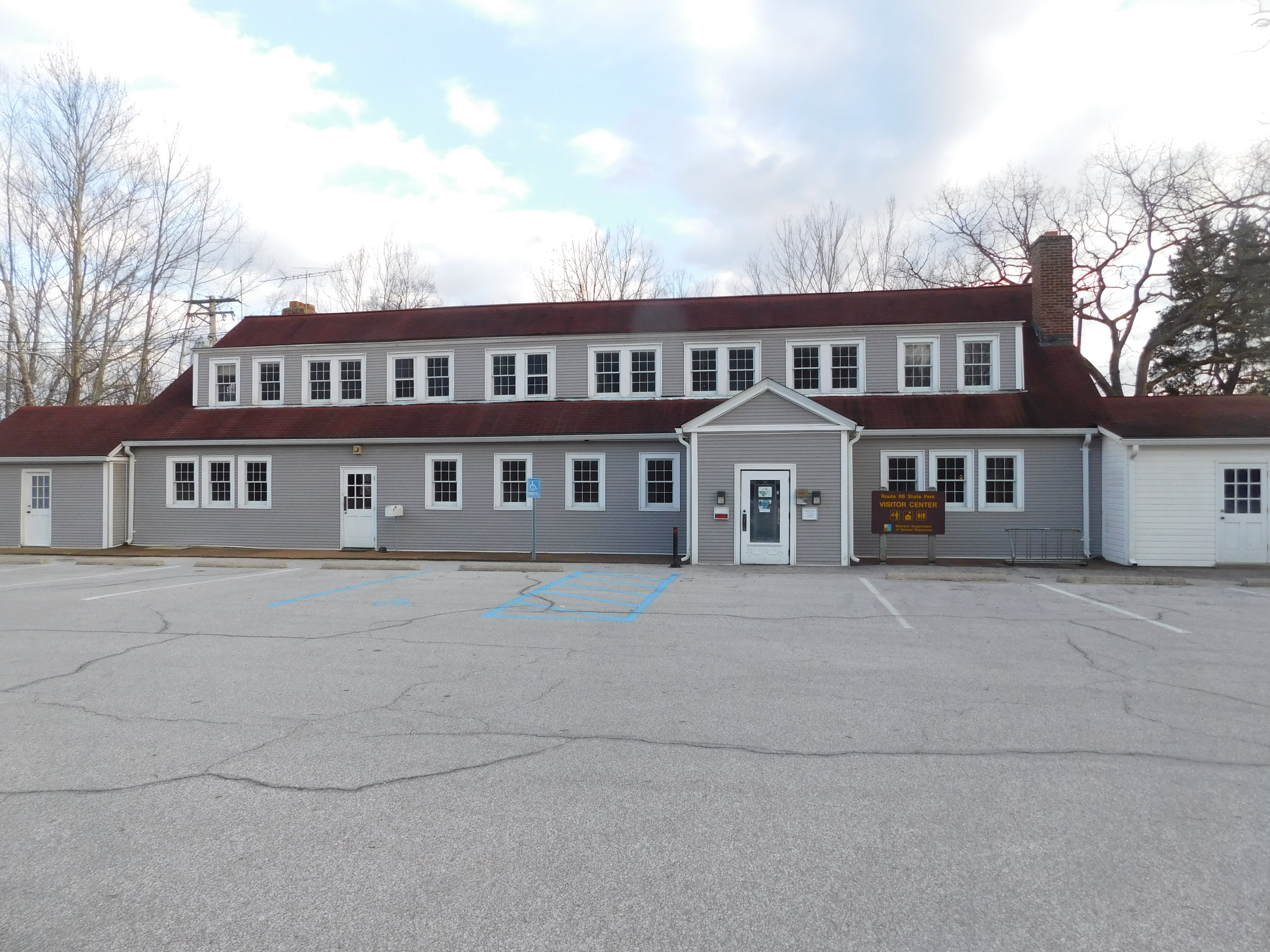
The former roadhouse, now the Route 66 State Park Visitor Center in January 2017

The land that was once Times Beach is now Route 66 State Park. One building from the town still exists: the park's visitor center was once a roadhouse from Times Beach's glory days and was the EPA's headquarters for the area. There is a large grass mound beneath which is the debris of the demolished buildings of the former town. The EPA revisited and tested the soil at the Route 66 State Park in June 2012. On November 19, 2012, it was reported that "Soil samples from Route 66 State Park show no significant health risks for park visitors or workers".

=== Controversy ===
Several months after the evacuation, the American Medical Association (AMA) publicly criticized the news media for spreading unscientific information about dioxin and the health hazards associated with it. The AMA stated that there was no evidence of adverse consequences from low-level dioxin exposure. Subsequent studies of potentially exposed people from Times Beach and some other contaminated locations in Missouri have revealed no adverse health outcomes that can be directly linked to dioxin. In a study conducted by the CDC and the Missouri Division of Health, no cases of chloracne (a common symptom of acute dioxin poisoning) were observed in Times Beach residents, nor any increased prevalence of any other disease.

By May 1991, Vernon Houk, the director of the CDC's Center for Environmental Health, had come to the same conclusion as the AMA. Although he had made the official recommendation to permanently relocate Times Beach residents in 1982, by 1991, he no longer believed that evacuation had been necessary. Houk's remarks were delivered at Syntex-sponsored conference, themselves facing dioxin-related legal action from former Times Beach residents.

== See also ==
- Bhopal disaster
- Centralia, Pennsylvania
- Love Canal
- National Priorities List
- Picher, Oklahoma
- Pripyat
- Seveso disaster
- Hafodyrynys
- Wittenoom, Western Australia
