= Weldon Springs (Missouri) =

Spring in Missouri, U.S.

Coordinates: 38.71319°N 90.68759°W

Weldon Spring is a spring in the city of Weldon Spring, in the U.S. state of Missouri.

Weldon Spring has the name of John and Joseph Weldon, pioneer citizens.
