= Francis Howell School District =

School district in Missouri, U.S.

The Francis Howell R-III School District, also known as the Francis Howell School District (FHSD), is a school district in Missouri, headquartered in O'Fallon in the St. Louis metropolitan area.

The district includes sections of St. Charles County, including all of New Melle, Weldon Spring, and Weldon Spring Heights. It also includes most of Cottleville, and portions of Dardenne Prairie, O'Fallon, St. Charles, St. Peters, and the Defiance census-designated place.

== History ==
Its first predecessor started operations in 1830. Through mergers, it became the Consolidated School District No. 2 of St. Charles County in 1913, and the Francis Howell Reorganized School District #3 in 1951. Population growth in the 1970s and 1980s, and continued into the 1990s. In the last five years student enrollment growth has shown a slight decline from year to year. While annual fluctuations in growth rates are likely, enrollment projections indicate that student population during the next five years will continue its slow and gradual decline. Enrollment is expected to level off at approximately 17,000 students. The District currently provides education to approximately 18,000 students preschool through twelfth grade, and an additional 8,000 students in its early childhood education programs.

The District encompasses approximately 150 square miles (390 km^{2}) in the southeast corner of St. Charles County and is one of the largest school districts in the State of Missouri. The cities within the District's boundaries including St. Peters, Cottleville, Weldon Spring, Harvester, southern portions of St. Charles City, and eastern portions of O’Fallon. The District's educational facilities include ten elementary, five middle and three high schools; three early childhood centers, and two alternative education schools.

The District was featured on the 2015 Jul 31 episode of This American Life. In 2013, the Missouri Supreme Court upheld a law that allowed students attending unaccredited school districts to transfer to other schools. A lawful decision was made that students from the neighboring Normandy School District would be able to attend schools within the Francis Howell School District. This led to Francis Howell district parents voicing concerns against the transfer of students even though they would pay out-of-district tuition. The town hall meeting went on for over two hours with almost 3,000 people in attendance. One parent stated : “I deserve to not have to worry about my children getting stabbed, or taking a drug, or getting robbed." Many of these parents were later criticized by some as a result of these remarks. Other parents drew similarities between their current controversy and that of desegregation busing during the Civil Rights Movement.

In 2014, the Francis Howell School District decided to no longer take out-of-district tuition and the Missouri State Board of Education to reconstitute the Normandy District as the Normandy Schools Collaborative and eliminate its “unaccredited” status.

As part of the George Floyd protests, protests were held in the district area, asking the district to use a resolution which suppoted Anti-Racism. The school board enacted this resolution in August of that year. In 2022 new elections were held, and the result was that the majority of the school board was aligned with conservatism. In 2023 the new board passed a policy that would rescinded any past non-binding resolution that was not adopted by the majority of the sitting board, formally ending a half dozen known resolutions from the past decade including the Anti-Racism Resolution. In December 2023, the board then voted 5–2 to disallow a 3rd party curriculum format that did not match those generally established and utilized within the District, affecting elective classes on Black Literature and Black History. All five voting in favor were elected in April with the financial backing of a conservative political action committee called Francis Howell Families.

The district previously had classes on African-American history in its schools. In 2023 the board of trustees voted to end a 3rd party curriculum format that did not match those generally established and utilized within the District, affecting those classes. Numerous Board of Trustee members that voted against the 3rd party format, publicly voiced their support for the classes to continue during the board meeting, should the District determine a way to accomplish that task. There was criticism of the removal from area residents, including parents and guardians, as well as students. After a week of discussions among the District Leadership, the board president and District Superintendent announced that the district would keep the existing classes, which were revamped into the generally established format of the District, utilized by all other courses in those departments.

Steven Blair and Carolie Owens would defeat the Francis Howell Families-backed Adriana Kuhn and Sam Young with a five percentage point margin in the 2024 school board elections.

In August 2024, the board passed resolutions to ban books containing sexual references, alcohol or drug use, profanity, or violence, institute a process which allows any district resident to remove books, a policy that restricts teachers from speaking about gender or sexuality, and a policy that prohibits “values judgments on human sexuality.”

== Schools ==
=== Elementary schools and locations ===
- Becky David Elementary School (St. Peters)
- Castilo Elementary School (St. Peters)
- Central Elementary School (St. Peters)
- Fairmount Elementary School (St. Peters)
- Henderson Elementary School (St. Peters)
- Daniel Boone Elementary School (New Melle)
- Harvest Ridge Elementary School (St. Charles)
- Independence Elementary School (Weldon Spring)
- John Weldon Elementary School (Dardenne Prairie)
- Warren Elementary School (Cottleville)
- Westwood Trail Academy (Alternative School, Weldon Spring)

=== Middle schools and locations ===
- Barnwell Middle School (St. Peters)
- Hollenbeck Middle School (St. Peters)
- Bryan Middle School (Weldon Spring)
- Francis Howell Middle School (Weldon Spring)
- Saeger Middle School (Cottleville)
- Westwood Trail Academy (Alternative School, Weldon Spring)

=== High schools and locations ===
- Francis Howell High School (Weldon Spring)
- Francis Howell Central High School (Cottleville)
- Francis Howell North High School (St. Peters)
- Francis Howell Union High School (Alternative School, Weldon Spring)
- Westwood Trail Academy (Alternative School, Weldon Spring)

== Further media ==
- "Black history expert weighs in on Francis Howell School District's removal of Black electives". KSDK. December 23, 2023 – via YouTube.
