= Old Pattonsburg, Missouri =

Ghost town in Missouri, U.S.

Coordinates: 40°02′48″N 94°08′09″W

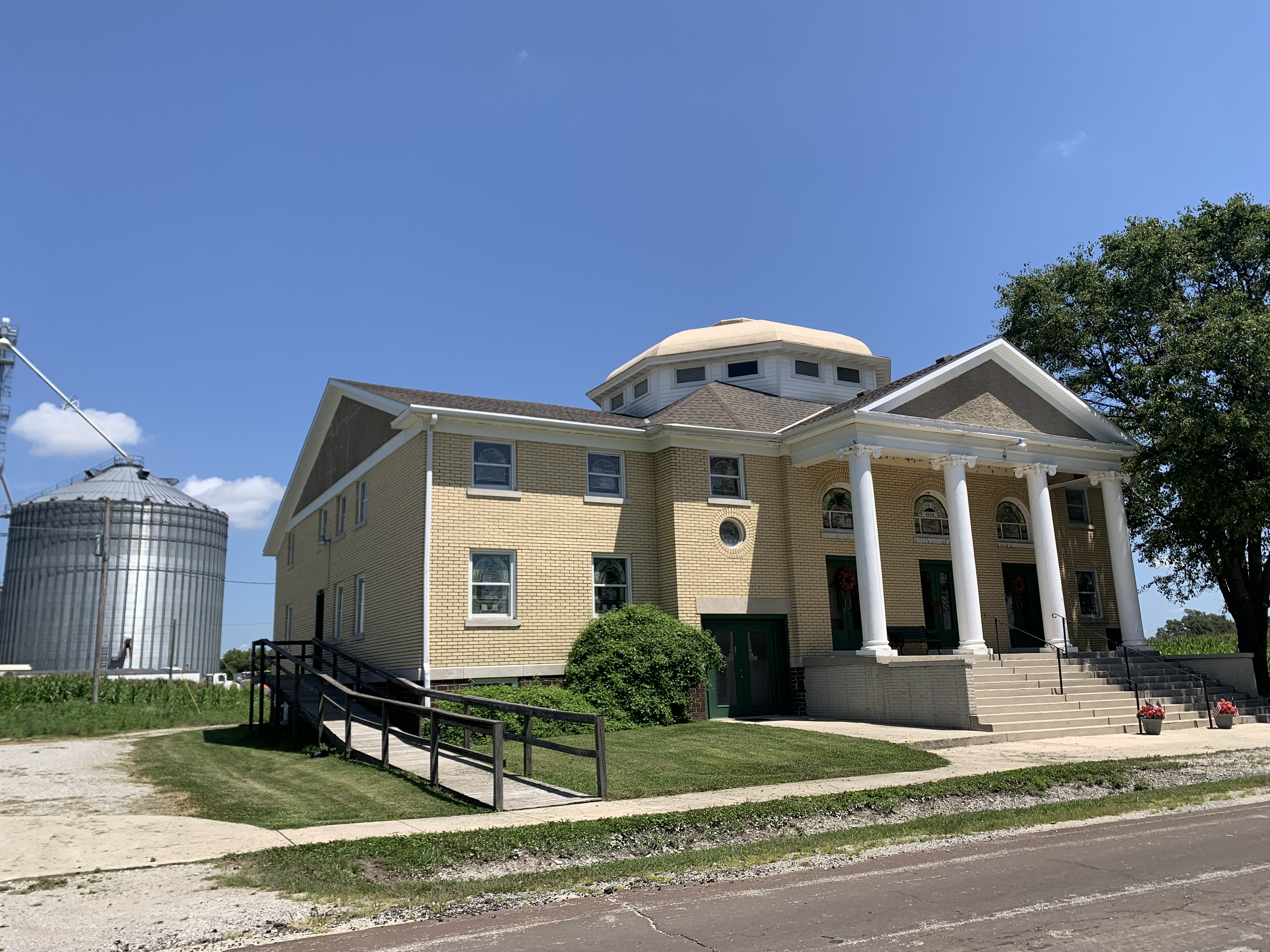
Christian Church in Old Pattonsburg

Old Pattonsburg is a ghost town in Daviess County, in the U.S. state of Missouri.

Old Pattonsburg was the original location of the nearby city of Pattonsburg, Missouri. "New" Pattonsburg was moved to its current site after the Flood of 1993 from the Grand River devastated the original town.
