= Georgia City, Missouri =

- Town (now defunct)
- Location of Jasper County in the state of Missouri

- Missouri's location in the U.S.
- Country: United States
- State: Missouri
- Counties: Jasper
- Town: 1868 - 1930
- GNIS Feature ID: 746053

Georgia City is the name of a former town in Jasper County, Missouri, United States, approximately 15 miles north of Joplin.

== History ==
Georgia City was founded in January 1868 by John C. Guinn. Named after his native state, Georgia, it had a population of 200 in March 1869. James Clayton Cox was also one of the founders. A post office was established at Georgia City in 1870, and remained in operation until 1904.

The town site was located in Sections 4 and 5 of Township 29 N, Range 33 W, where present-day Oak Road dead-ends at County Road 270, approximately four miles east of Asbury, 37°16′26″N 94°32′36″W.

By 1883, the population had declined to 50, and by 1912 the town had essentially disappeared,. In February 1930, it officially ceased to exist when the county court granted a petition presented by Lottie Guinn Young, daughter of the founder, asking that the streets and alleys of the platted village be vacated and the land formally returned to farm acreage. Now all that remains is the Georgia City Cemetery at 37°17′22″N 94°32′31″W.

== Maps ==
Some historical maps survive:

- 1876 Plat Map, An Illustrated Historical Atlas Map of Jasper County, Mo. published by Brink, McDonough and Company, 1876, page 41
- 1884 USGS Topographical Map, Joplin Sheet
- 1895 Asbury and Georgia City, Jasper County, Missouri
