= Route 66 State Park =

Public recreation area in Missouri, US

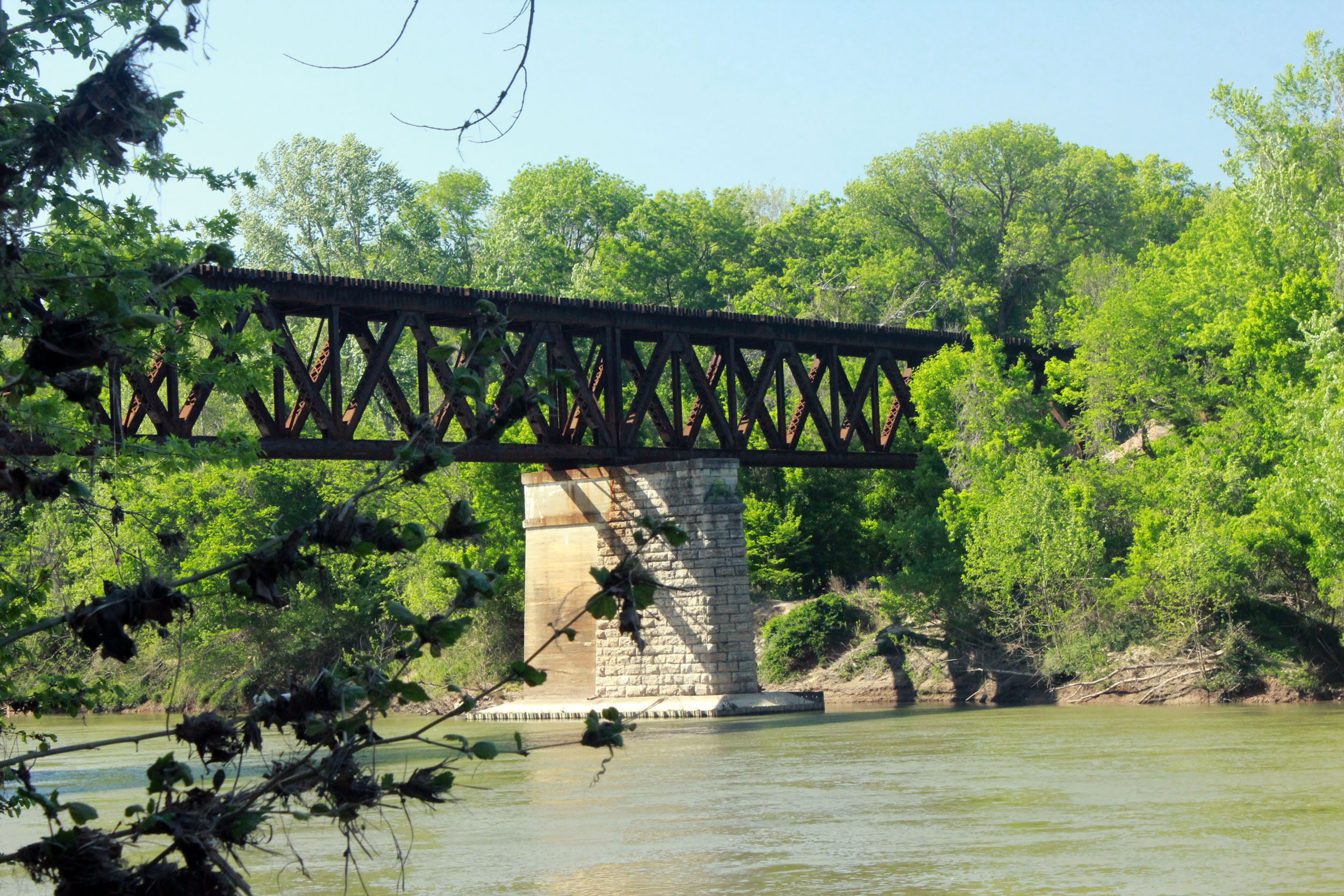
- The closed Route 66 bridge on the Meramec River

- Location within Missouri Location within the United States
- Location: St. Louis County, Missouri, United States
- Coordinates: 38°30′31″N 90°36′09″W
- Area: 424.02 acres (171.59 ha)
- Elevation: 436 ft (133 m)
- Established: 1997
- Administrator: Missouri Department of Natural Resources
- Visitors: 271,112 (in 2023)
- Website: Official website

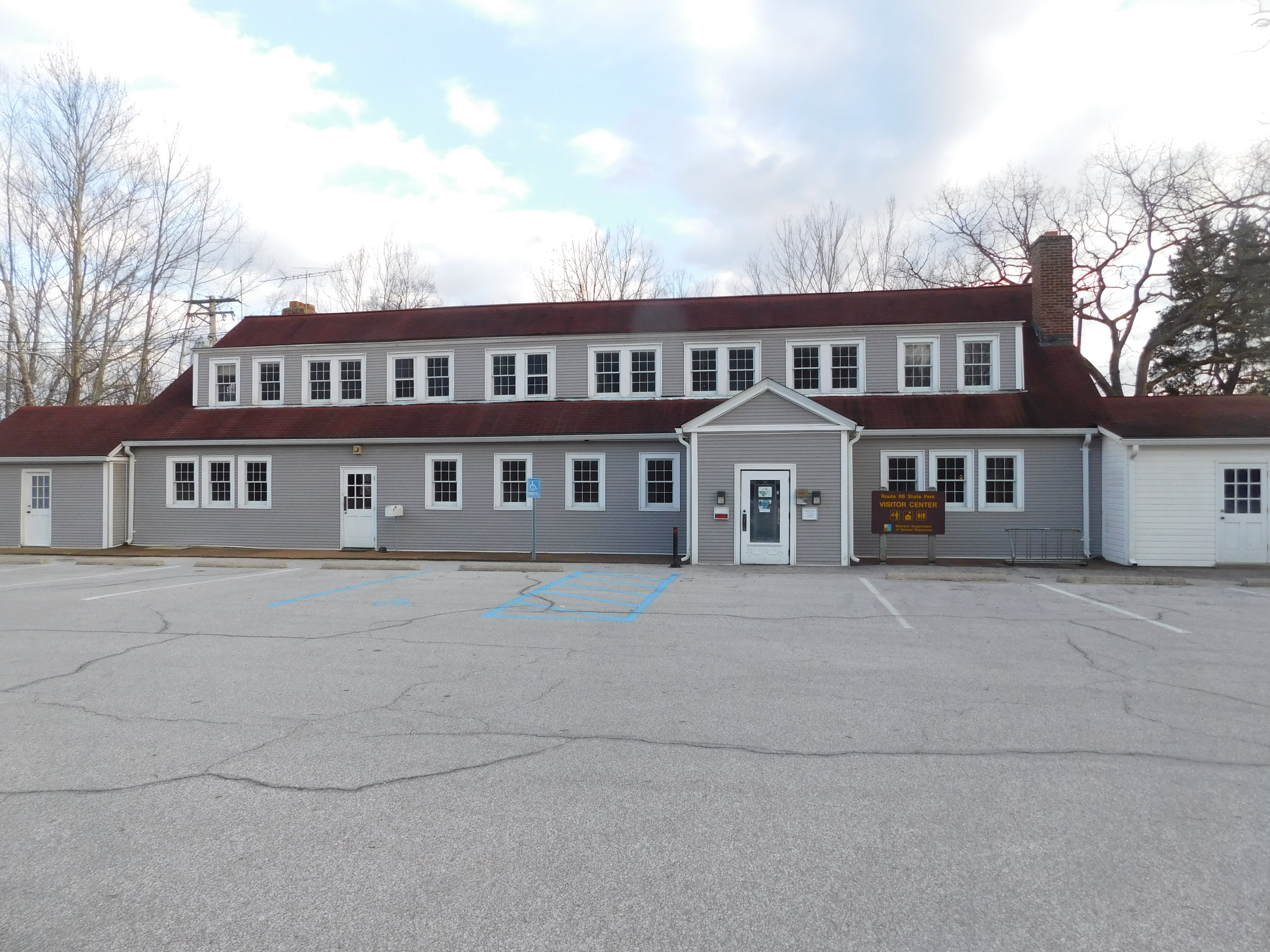
Former roadhouse, the park's cutoff visitor center

Route 66 State Park is a public recreation area located on the Meramec River at the site of the former town of Times Beach, Missouri. The state park encompasses 424 acres (172 ha) one mile (1.6 km) east of Eureka. The park offers hiking, cycling, and equestrian trails, picnicking areas, and a boat ramp.

== History ==
Times Beach was bought, dismantled, and decontaminated by the United States Environmental Protection Agency following the discovery of widespread dioxin contamination in the 1980s. Fields of wild grass and brush now grow where the homes of evacuated residents formerly stood. Deserted streets line the park and hint at what once was a community in west Saint Louis County.

== Activities and amenities ==
The park has a boat ramp providing access to the river as well as a picnic area and trails for hiking, cycling, and equestrian use. The visitor center exhibits photos and memorabilia of structures along Route 66 in the Saint Louis area which have been torn down and replaced by modern shopping centers and strip malls. Displays include the first historic Route 66 marker, originally erected on the highway in Springfield, Missouri, as well as an interpretation of the ecological disaster and 20-year cleanup of the area.

=== Route 66 bridge ===
The visitor center, located in the old Bridgehead Inn on the east side of the Meramec River, was joined to the park on the west side by the old Route 66 bridge, which has been closed due to safety concerns. The park itself is accessible only from east-bound Interstate 44 at exit 265. The visitor center is accessed from either direction at exit 266 and is cut off from the park it serves. A plan to restore the bridge to usability is projected to be completed in 2026.
