= Radical, Missouri =

Extinct hamlet in Missouri, U.S.

Coordinates: 36°37′22″N 93°25′09″W

Radical is an extinct town in Stone County, in the U.S. state of Missouri. The GNIS classifies it as a populated place.

A post office called Radical was established in 1878, and remained in operation until 1944. The community was named for the fact a large share of the first settlers were Radical Republicans in politics.
