= Howell, Missouri =

Unincorporated community in Missouri, U.S.

Coordinates: 38°44′35″N 90°36′39″W

Howell is an unincorporated community in St. Charles County, in the U.S. state of Missouri. Much of the community has been annexed by St. Peters.

== History ==
A post office called Howell was established in 1900, and remained in operation until 1917. The community has the name of Francis Howell, a local educator. Jazz pianists Ralph Sutton and Barbara Sutton Curtis were from Howell.
