= Weldon Spring Conservation Area =

Protected land in Missouri, U.S.

- IUCN category IV (habitat/species management area)
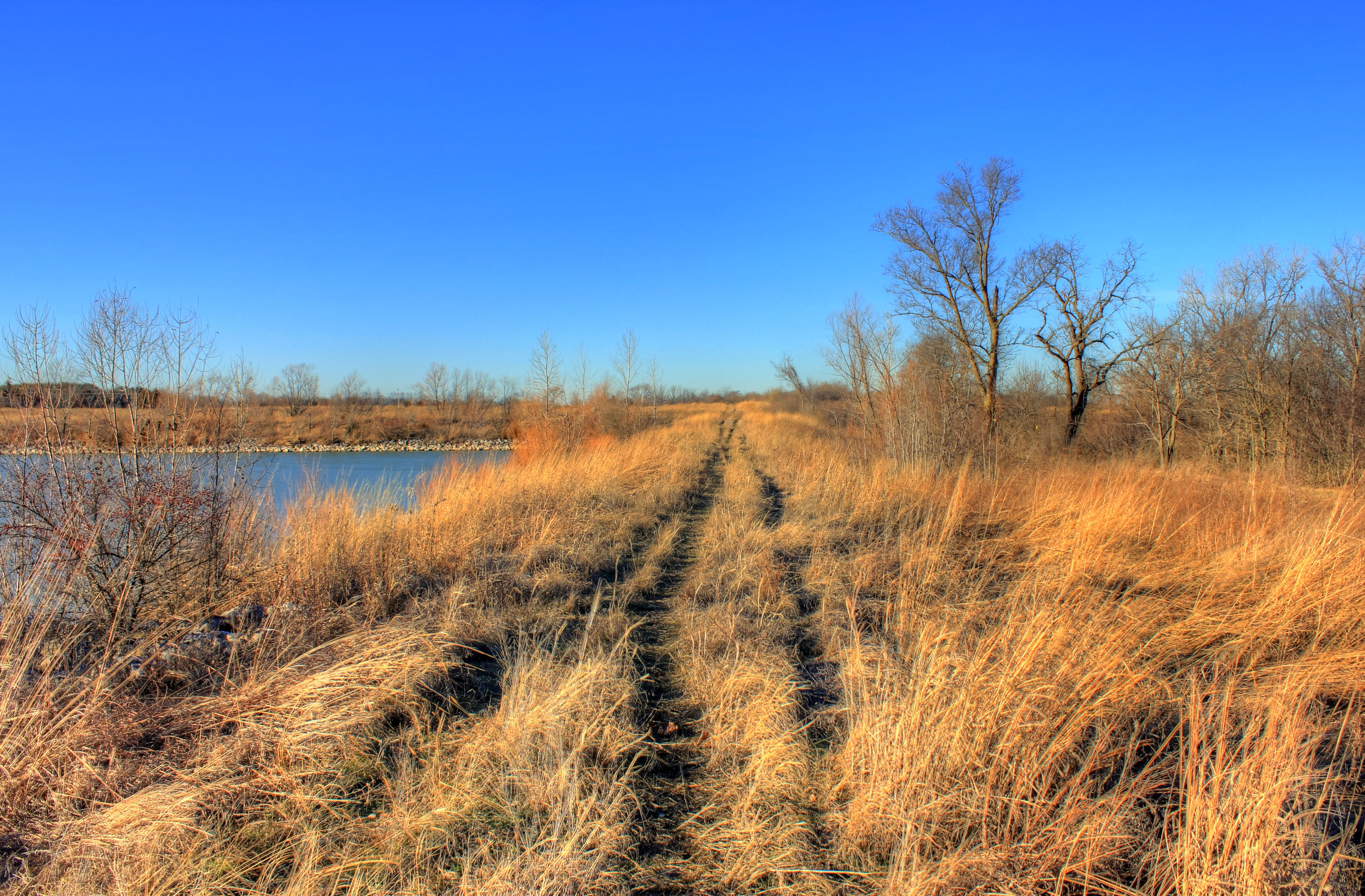
- A hiking trail near the lake

- Location within Missouri
- Location: St. Charles County, Missouri, USA
- Nearest city: Weldon Spring, MO
- Coordinates: 38.675°N 90.769444°W
- Area: 8,398.09 acres (34.0 km^{2})
- Established: 1978
- Governing body: Missouri Department of Conservation
- Website: Official website

The Weldon Spring Conservation Area, is a 8,398-acre (33.99 km^{2}) conservation area that is owned and managed by the Missouri Department of Conservation and located in St. Charles County, Missouri. The area borders the Missouri River, and the Katy Trail runs through the area but is not considered part of the conservation area.

== History ==
The area was named for John Weldon, who immigrated to the area in 1796 and acquired a 425-acre (1.72 km^{2}) Spanish Land Grant. During WWII The U.S. Government acquired nearly 17,000 acres (6,900 ha) in the area to build a munitions plant. Portions of the Conservation Area were used by the Weldon Spring Ordnance Works, and old bunkers formerly used for the storage of TNT still dot the area. The area is part of a superfund site, and has been decontaminated. TNT and uranium processing were done on this site.

All of the land except the munitions plant was given to the University of Missouri in 1948 for use as an agricultural experiment station. The Department of Conservation originally purchased 7,230 acres (2,930 ha) from the University of Missouri to establish the conservation area in 1978.

== Geography ==
The area currently has 8,398.09 acres (3,398.59 ha), which includes 6,752.5 acres (2,732.6 ha) of forest and woodland, 744 acres (301 ha) of cropland, 500 acres (200 ha) of sparsely vegetation sand flats, 300 acres (120 ha) of grassland, 66 acres (27 ha) of lakes and ponds, 20 acres (8.1 ha) of glades, and 16 acres (6.5 ha) of wetlands. The area has numerous limestone cliffs overlooking the Missouri River. The floods of 1993 and 1995 deposited sand on almost 1,000 acres (400 ha) of agricultural fields, which now provides valuable wildlife habitat.

== Recreation ==
The area provides a wide variety of recreational activities.

=== Hunting and fishing ===
There are several small lakes and streams as well as the Missouri river that provide fishing opportunities in the conservation area. Hunting is permitted during special managed hunts as long as regulations are followed.

=== Hiking and biking ===
There are 29.5 miles (47.5 km) of trails in the conservation area. This does not include the Katy Trail, which is part of the state park system. Two of the trails, the Lewis and Clark trails, are open to hiking only, while the Lost Valley and Hamburg trails are open to both hiking and biking.

- Lewis Trail - 8.2 miles (13.2 km) - hiking only
- Clark Trail - 5.3 miles (8.5 km) - hiking only
- Lost Valley Trail - 10.0 miles (16.1 km) - multi-use
- Hamburg Trail - 6.0 miles (9.7 km) - multi-use
