= Dinitrotoluene =

Dinitrotoluenes could refer to one of the following compounds:

- 2,3-Dinitrotoluene
- 2,4-Dinitrotoluene
- 2,5-Dinitrotoluene
- 2,6-Dinitrotoluene
- 3,4-Dinitrotoluene
- 3,5-Dinitrotoluene
