= Verona, Missouri =

- City
- Location of Verona, Missouri
- Coordinates: 36°57′47″N 93°47′44″W
- Country: United States
- State: Missouri
- County: Lawrence
- Founded: 1857
- Incorporated: 1916

Government
  - Mayor: Amy Spears

Area
  - Total: 0.87 sq mi (2.25 km^{2})
  - Land: 0.87 sq mi (2.25 km^{2})
  - Water: 0.0039 sq mi (0.01 km^{2})
- Elevation: 1,280 ft (390 m)

Population (2020)
  - Total: 507
  - Density: 584.0/sq mi (225.47/km^{2})
- Time zone: UTC-6 (Central (CST))
  - Summer (DST): UTC-5 (CDT)
- ZIP code: 65769
- Area code: 417
- FIPS code: 29-75886
- GNIS feature ID: 0728175

Verona is a city in Lawrence County, Missouri, United States. The population was 619 at the 2010 census, later estimated to be 826 as of July 1, 2020.

== History ==
A post office called Verona has been in operation since 1857. The town site was platted in 1868. The community was named after Verona, Italy. The city was incorporated in 1916.

== Geography ==
Verona is located at 36°57′47″N 93°47′44″W (36.963034, -93.795626).

According to the United States Census Bureau, the city has a total area of 0.87 square miles (2.25 km^{2}), all land.

== Demographics ==
Historical population
Census	Pop.	Note	%±
1870	240		—
1880	479		99.6%
1910	446		—
1920	438		−1.8%
1930	390		−11.0%
1940	405		3.8%
1950	396		−2.2%
1960	401		1.3%
1970	515		28.4%
1980	592		15.0%
1990	546		−7.8%
2000	714		30.8%
2010	619		−13.3%
2020	507		−18.1%
U.S. Decennial Census

=== 2010 census ===
As of the census of 2010, there were 619 people, 206 households, and 146 families living in the city. The population density was 711.5 inhabitants per square mile (274.7/km^{2}). There were 239 housing units at an average density of 274.7 per square mile (106.1/km^{2}). The racial makeup of the city was 68.2% White, 1.5% Native American, 0.2% Pacific Islander, 27.9% from other races, and 2.3% from two or more races. Hispanic or Latino of any race were 45.7% of the population.

There were 206 households, of which 45.6% had children under the age of 18 living with them, 53.9% were married couples living together, 11.7% had a female householder with no husband present, 5.3% had a male householder with no wife present, and 29.1% were non-families. 26.7% of all households were made up of individuals, and 15% had someone living alone who was 65 years of age or older. The average household size was 3.00 and the average family size was 3.68.

The median age in the city was 30.7 years. 33.8% of residents were under the age of 18; 7.8% were between the ages of 18 and 24; 27.1% were from 25 to 44; 19.6% were from 45 to 64; and 12% were 65 years of age or older. The gender makeup of the city was 50.4% male and 49.6% female.

=== 2000 census ===
As of the census of 2000, there were 714 people, 238 households, and 170 families living in the town. The population density was 820.3 inhabitants per square mile (316.7/km^{2}). There were 252 housing units at an average density of 289.5 per square mile (111.8/km^{2}). The racial makeup of the town was 79.41% White, 1.54% African American, 0.70% Native American, 0.28% Asian, 16.39% from other races, and 1.68% from two or more races. Hispanic or Latino of any race were 30.95% of the population.

There were 238 households, out of which 35.7% had children under the age of 18 living with them, 54.2% were married couples living together, 10.9% had a female householder with no husband present, and 28.2% were non-families. 23.1% of all households were made up of individuals, and 13.4% had someone living alone who was 65 years of age or older. The average household size was 3.00 and the average family size was 3.52.

In the town the population was spread out, with 31.1% under the age of 18, 10.2% from 18 to 24, 27.3% from 25 to 44, 21.6% from 45 to 64, and 9.8% who were 65 years of age or older. The median age was 31 years. For every 100 females, there were 96.2 males. For every 100 females age 18 and over, there were 96.0 males.

The median income for a household in the town was $27,813, and the median income for a family was $30,156. Males had a median income of $21,250 versus $16,442 for females. The per capita income for the town was $11,750. About 19.4% of families and 26.4% of the population were below the poverty line, including 36.6% of those under age 18 and 12.2% of those age 65 or over.

== Education ==
The Verona R-VII school district operates one elementary school, and the Verona High School.

== See also ==
- NEPACCO
