= 2,4-Dinitrotoluene =

Organic chemical compound

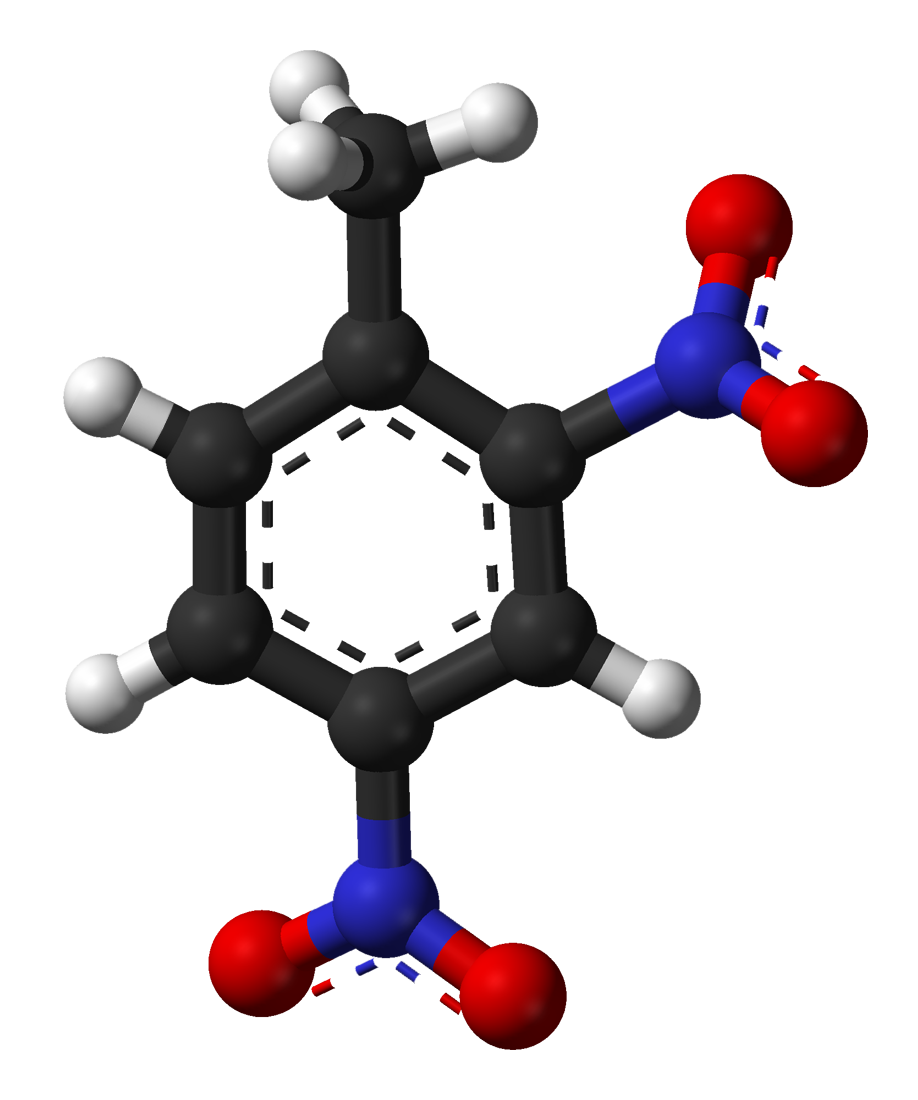

Names
- Preferred IUPAC name 1-Methyl-2,4-dinitrobenzene
- Other names Dinitrotoluol, Methyldinitrobenzene

Identifiers
CAS Number	121-14-2
3D model (JSmol)	Interactive image
ChEBI	CHEBI:920
ChEMBL	ChEMBL259865
ChemSpider	8150
ECHA InfoCard	100.004.046
KEGG	C11006
PubChem CID	8461
UNII	6741D310ED
UN number	Molten: 1600; Solid or liquid: 2038
CompTox Dashboard (EPA)	DTXSID0020529
- InChI: InChI=1S/C7H6N2O4/c1-5-2-3-6(8(10)11)4-7(5)9(12)13/h2-4H,1H3 Key: RMBFBMJGBANMMK-UHFFFAOYSA-N; InChI=1/C7H6N2O4/c1-5-2-3-6(8(10)11)4-7(5)9(12)13/h2-4H,1H3 Key: RMBFBMJGBANMMK-UHFFFAOYAC
- SMILES: Cc1ccc(cc1[N+](=O)[O-])[N+](=O)[O-]

Properties
Chemical formula	C_{7}H_{6}N_{2}O_{4}
Molar mass	182.134 g/mol
Appearance	Pale yellow to orange crystalline solid
Density	1.52 g/cm^{3}
Melting point	70 °C (158 °F; 343 K)
Boiling point	Decomposes at 250–300 °C
Vapor pressure	1.47·10^{−4} mm Hg at 22 °C

Hazards
- Occupational safety and health (OHS/OSH)
Main hazards	carcinogen, combustible (though difficult to ignite)
NFPA 704 (fire diamond)	3 1 3
Flash point	207 °C; 404 °F; 480 K
- Lethal dose or concentration (LD, LC)
LD_{50} (median dose)	1,954 mg/kg (oral, mouse)
LD_{Lo} (lowest published)	27 mg/kg (cat, oral)
- NIOSH (US health exposure limits)
PEL (Permissible)	TWA 1.5 mg/m^{3} [skin]
REL (Recommended)	Ca TWA 1.5 mg/m^{3} [skin]
IDLH (Immediate danger)	Ca [50 mg/m^{3}]

Explosive data
Shock sensitivity	Insensitive
Friction sensitivity	Very low
- Except where otherwise noted, data are given for materials in their standard state (at 25 °C [77 °F], 100 kPa). verify (what is ?) Infobox references

2,4-Dinitrotoluene (DNT) or dinitro is an organic compound with the formula C_{7}H_{6}N_{2}O_{4}. This pale yellow crystalline solid is well known as a precursor to trinitrotoluene (TNT) but is mainly produced as a precursor to toluene diisocyanate.

== Isomers of dinitrotoluene ==
The most common of the six positional isomers possible for dinitrotoluene is 2,4-dinitrotoluene. The nitration of toluene gives sequentially mononitrotoluene, DNT, and finally TNT. 2,4-DNT is the principal product from dinitration, the other main product being about 30% 1,3-DN2-T. The nitration of 4-nitrotoluene gives 2,4-DNT.

== Applications ==
Most DNT is used in the production of toluene diisocyanate, which is used to produce flexible polyurethane foams. DNT is hydrogenated to produce 2,4-toluenediamine, which in turn is phosgenated to give toluene diisocyanate. In this way, about 1.4 billion kilograms are produced annually, as of the years 1999–2000. Other uses include the explosives industry. It is not used by itself as an explosive, but some of the production is converted to TNT.

Dinitrotoluene is frequently used as a plasticizer, deterrent coating, and burn rate modifier in propellants (e.g., smokeless gunpowders). As it is carcinogenic and toxic, modern formulations tend to avoid its use. In this application it is often used together with dibutyl phthalate.

== Toxicity ==
Dinitrotoluenes are highly toxic with a threshold limit value (TLV) of 1.5 mg/m^{3}. It converts hemoglobin into methemoglobin.

2,4-Dinitrotoluene is also a listed hazardous waste under 40 CFR 261.24. Its United States Environmental Protection Agency (EPA) Hazardous Waste Number is D030. The maximum concentration that may be contained to not have toxic characteristics is 0.13 mg/L.
