= Weldon Spring, Missouri =

- City
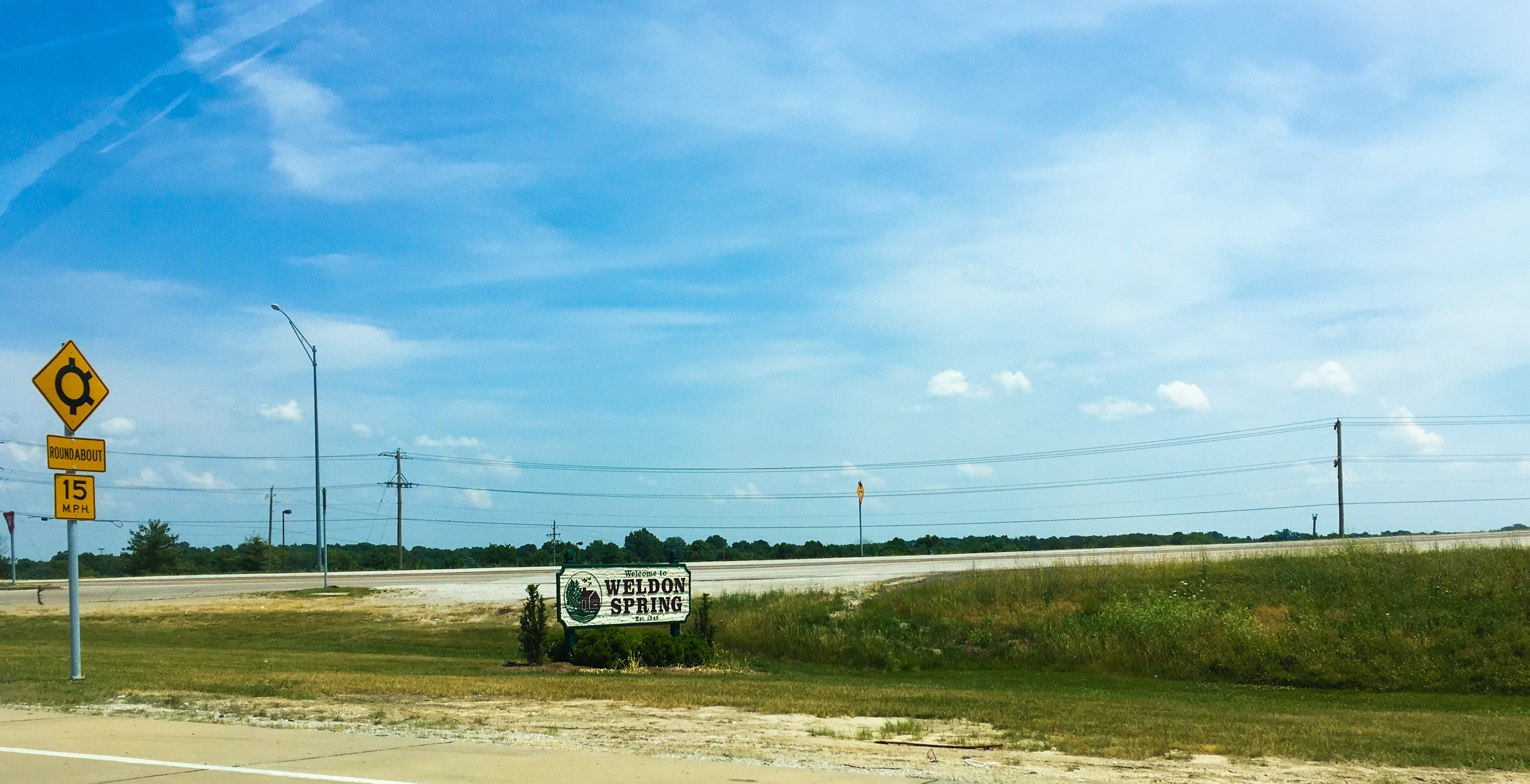
- Welcome sign to Weldon Spring, Missouri in June 2018

- Location of Weldon Spring, Missouri
- Coordinates: 38°43′0″N 90°38′57″W
- Country: United States
- State: Missouri
- County: St. Charles

Area
  - Total: 7.78 sq mi (20.14 km^{2})
  - Land: 7.65 sq mi (19.81 km^{2})
  - Water: 0.13 sq mi (0.33 km^{2})
- Elevation: 541 ft (165 m)

Population (2020)
  - Total: 5,326
  - Density: 696.5/sq mi (268.91/km^{2})
- Time zone: UTC-6 (Central (CST))
  - Summer (DST): UTC-5 (CDT)
- FIPS code: 29-78314
- GNIS feature ID: 0756882
- Website: weldonspring.gov

Weldon Spring is a city in St. Charles County, Missouri, United States. The population was 5,326 at the 2020 census.

== History ==
Weldon Spring was platted in 1864. The community took its name from a spring of the same name near the original town site. A post office called Weldon Spring was established in 1875, and remained in operation until 1957.

In 1941, the United States Army purchased 17,000 acres of land in the surrounding area. The Weldon Spring Ordnance Works built the largest explosives factory in the United States on the site. It was built to produce TNT and DNT for Allied forces during World War II. It closed on August 15, 1945, days after the end of the war. Most of the land was then sold.

A proposal appeared in 1945 suggesting the placement of United Nations Headquarters in the area.

In 1955, the United States Atomic Energy Commission built a uranium ore processing plant on the 2,000 remaining acres. Weldon Spring Uranium Feed Mill Plant produced yellow cake uranium ore. In 1966, the plant closed and remained abandoned for 20 years. The site was contaminated with over 1.5 million cubic yards of asbestos, radioactive uranium and contaminated rubble. The U.S. Department of Energy began a decontamination of the site in the late 1980s and completed it in 2001, with a 45-acre rubble mountain over the site.

== Geography ==
Weldon Spring is located 27 miles west-northwest of St. Louis.

According to the United States Census Bureau, the city has a total area of 7.64 square miles (19.79 km^{2}), of which 7.51 square miles (19.45 km^{2}) is land and 0.13 square miles (0.34 km^{2}) is water.

=== Climate ===
Climate data for Weldon Spring, Missouri (1991–2020 normals, extremes 1957–present)
Month	Jan	Feb	Mar	Apr	May	Jun	Jul	Aug	Sep	Oct	Nov	Dec	Year
Record high °F (°C)	76 (24)	85 (29)	93 (34)	94 (34)	93 (34)	106 (41)	107 (42)	109 (43)	102 (39)	95 (35)	85 (29)	78 (26)	109 (43)
Mean maximum °F (°C)	66.1 (18.9)	71.0 (21.7)	78.9 (26.1)	86.8 (30.4)	88.9 (31.6)	92.8 (33.8)	96.1 (35.6)	97.0 (36.1)	92.3 (33.5)	85.9 (29.9)	75.8 (24.3)	67.2 (19.6)	98.5 (36.9)
Mean daily maximum °F (°C)	39.3 (4.1)	44.8 (7.1)	55.2 (12.9)	67.0 (19.4)	75.7 (24.3)	83.7 (28.7)	87.5 (30.8)	86.7 (30.4)	79.8 (26.6)	68.3 (20.2)	55.4 (13.0)	44.0 (6.7)	65.6 (18.7)
Daily mean °F (°C)	30.3 (−0.9)	34.6 (1.4)	44.2 (6.8)	55.4 (13.0)	65.0 (18.3)	73.5 (23.1)	77.4 (25.2)	76.0 (24.4)	68.4 (20.2)	56.9 (13.8)	45.2 (7.3)	35.0 (1.7)	55.2 (12.9)
Mean daily minimum °F (°C)	21.2 (−6.0)	24.4 (−4.2)	33.3 (0.7)	43.8 (6.6)	54.2 (12.3)	63.3 (17.4)	67.3 (19.6)	65.4 (18.6)	57.0 (13.9)	45.6 (7.6)	34.9 (1.6)	25.9 (−3.4)	44.7 (7.1)
Mean minimum °F (°C)	2.1 (−16.6)	7.4 (−13.7)	15.9 (−8.9)	29.7 (−1.3)	39.5 (4.2)	51.1 (10.6)	57.1 (13.9)	55.6 (13.1)	43.4 (6.3)	30.5 (−0.8)	19.1 (−7.2)	9.1 (−12.7)	−1.6 (−18.7)
Record low °F (°C)	−23 (−31)	−14 (−26)	−11 (−24)	18 (−8)	26 (−3)	39 (4)	43 (6)	36 (2)	22 (−6)	19 (−7)	0 (−18)	−28 (−33)	−28 (−33)
Average precipitation inches (mm)	2.61 (66)	2.43 (62)	3.74 (95)	4.70 (119)	5.09 (129)	4.72 (120)	3.92 (100)	3.58 (91)	3.50 (89)	3.37 (86)	3.69 (94)	3.07 (78)	44.42 (1,128)
Average snowfall inches (cm)	4.1 (10)	3.7 (9.4)	1.7 (4.3)	0.2 (0.51)	0.0 (0.0)	0.0 (0.0)	0.0 (0.0)	0.0 (0.0)	0.0 (0.0)	0.0 (0.0)	0.8 (2.0)	3.0 (7.6)	13.5 (34)
Average precipitation days (≥ 0.01 in)	7.7	8.2	10.0	10.2	12.6	9.9	7.9	8.1	7.0	8.5	8.4	8.1	106.6
Average snowy days (≥ 0.1 in)	3.2	3.6	1.7	0.1	0.0	0.0	0.0	0.0	0.0	0.0	0.8	2.7	12.1
Source: NOAA

== Demographics ==
Historical population
Census	Pop.	Note	%±
1880	43		—
1990	1,470		—
2000	5,270		258.5%
2010	5,443		3.3%
2020	5,326		−2.1%
U.S. Decennial Census

=== 2020 census ===
As of the 2020 census, Weldon Spring had a population of 5,326. The median age was 53.1 years. 18.0% of residents were under the age of 18 and 27.3% of residents were 65 years of age or older. For every 100 females there were 95.2 males, and for every 100 females age 18 and over there were 93.6 males age 18 and over.

90.2% of residents lived in urban areas, while 9.8% lived in rural areas.

There were 2,087 households in Weldon Spring, of which 25.3% had children under the age of 18 living in them. Of all households, 70.5% were married-couple households, 9.3% were households with a male householder and no spouse or partner present, and 17.6% were households with a female householder and no spouse or partner present. About 20.5% of all households were made up of individuals and 15.3% had someone living alone who was 65 years of age or older.

There were 2,310 housing units, of which 9.7% were vacant. The homeowner vacancy rate was 0.4% and the rental vacancy rate was 42.2%.

Racial composition as of the 2020 census
Race	Number	Percent
White	4,927	92.5%
Black or African American	82	1.5%
American Indian and Alaska Native	4	0.1%
Asian	95	1.8%
Native Hawaiian and Other Pacific Islander	0	0.0%
Some other race	12	0.2%
Two or more races	206	3.9%
Hispanic or Latino (of any race)	80	1.5%

=== 2010 census ===
According to 2010 census, there were 5,443 people, 2,050 households, and 1,580 families residing in the city. The population density was 724.8 inhabitants per square mile (279.8/km^{2}). There were 2,151 housing units at an average density of 286.4 per square mile (110.6/km^{2}). The racial makeup of the city was 95.5% White, 1.4% African American, 0.1% Native American, 1.9% Asian, 0.3% from other races, and 0.8% from two or more races. Hispanic or Latino of any race were 1.0% of the population.

There were 2,050 households, of which 30.8% had children under the age of 18 living with them, 70.9% were married couples living together, 4.0% had a female householder with no husband present, 2.1% had a male householder with no wife present, and 22.9% were non-families. 20.5% of all households were made up of individuals, and 13.3% had someone living alone who was 65 years of age or older. The average household size was 2.59 and the average family size was 3.01.

The median age in the city was 48.7 years. 22.5% of residents were under the age of 18; 6.1% were between the ages of 18 and 24; 14.8% were from 25 to 44; 36.7% were from 45 to 64; and 20.1% were 65 years of age or older. The gender makeup of the city was 47.6% male and 52.4% female.

=== 2000 census ===
As of the census of 2000, there were 5,270 people, 1,880 households, and 1,462 families residing in the city. The population density was 666.0 inhabitants per square mile (257.1/km^{2}). There were 1,926 housing units at an average density of 243.4 per square mile (94.0/km^{2}). The racial makeup of the city was 96.00% White, 1.82% African American, 0.15% Native American, 1.08% Asian, 0.04% Pacific Islander, 0.30% from other races, and 0.61% from two or more races. Hispanic or Latino of any race were 1.10% of the population.

There were 1,880 households, out of which 35.7% had children under the age of 18 living with them, 73.1% were married couples living together, 3.4% had a female householder with no husband present, and 22.2% were non-families. 20.1% of all households were made up of individuals, and 11.9% had someone living alone who was 65 years of age or older. The average household size was 2.66 and the average family size was 3.09.

In the city the population was spread out, with 26.6% under the age of 18, 4.2% from 18 to 24, 24.1% from 25 to 44, 29.0% from 45 to 64, and 16.2% who were 65 years of age or older. The median age was 42 years. For every 100 females there were 89.4 males. For every 100 females age 18 and over, there were 85.3 males.

The median income for a household in the city was $87,998, and the median income for a family was $102,516. Males had a median income of $66,522 versus $40,339 for females. The per capita income for the city was $40,810. About 2.6% of families and 4.4% of the population were below the poverty line, including 2.7% of those under age 18 and 12.5% of those age 65 or over.

== Education ==
All of Weldon Spring belongs to the Francis Howell School District, and the municipality houses two public schools. The Independence Elementary School and Mary Emily Bryan Middle School are located in the city. The only private/parochial school within city limits is the Messiah Lutheran School. Other area options include: Catholic Parish Schools such as St. Joseph's of Cottleville; also, many parents choose to educate their children in Catholic primary schools (Academy of the Sacred Heart, Visitation Academy, Priory, and St. Peters School are the biggest ones) and Catholic secondary education (Cor Jesu Academy, Nerinx Hall, Ursuline Academy, Visitation Academy, Villa Duchesne and Oak Hill School, Incarnate Word Academy, Chaminade Academy, Christian Brothers College (CBC) High School, De Smet Jesuit High School, St. Louis University High School (SLUH), and Duchesne Academy are the most popular).
