= Amoco =

American fuel station chain owned by BP

Amoco Corporation

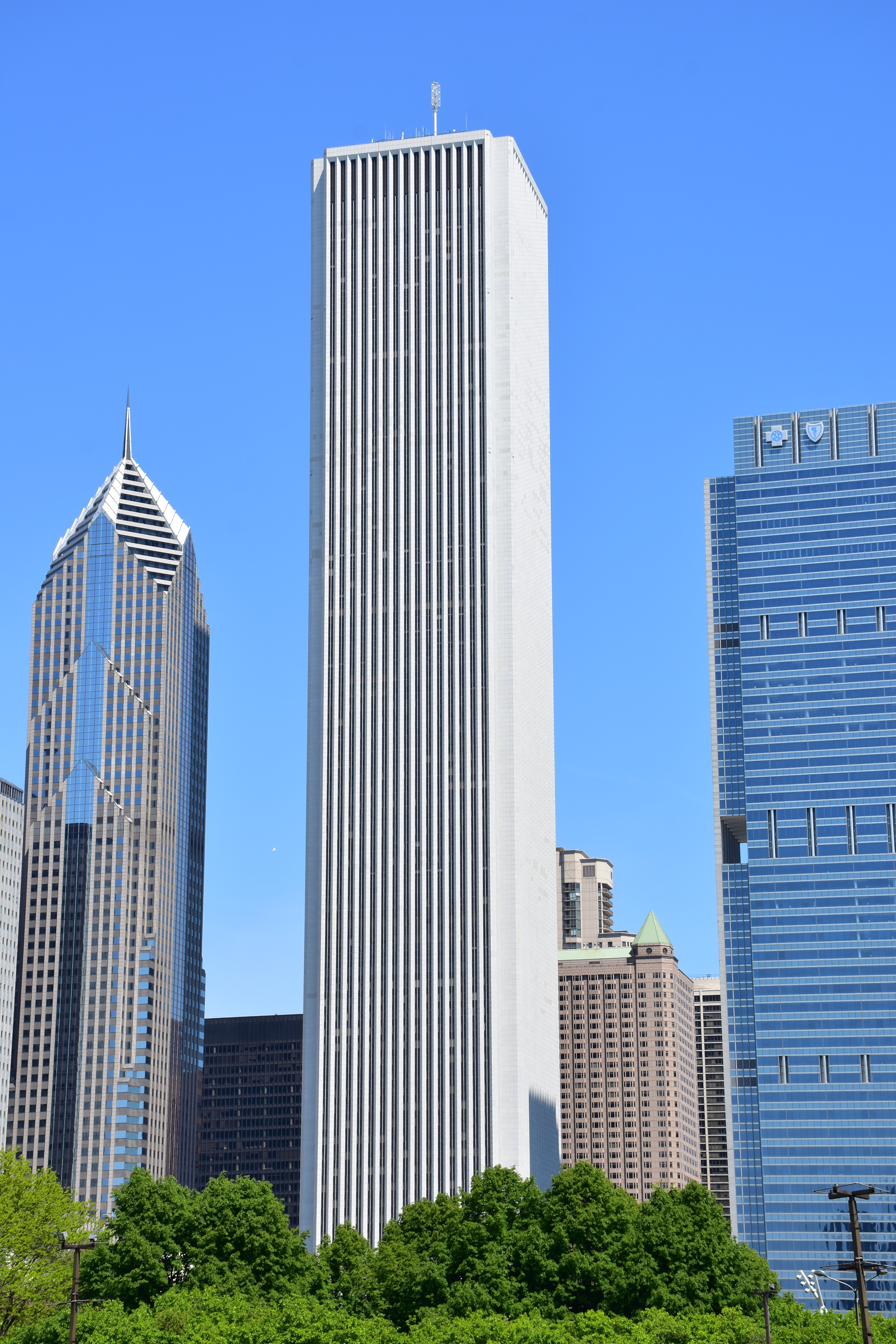
- The Amoco Building (now the Aon Center) housed the Amoco headquarters in Chicago
- Trade name: Amoco; Standard; and American
- Formerly: Standard Oil Company of Indiana (1911–1985); Amoco Corporation (1985–1998)
- Type: Public
- Traded as: NYSE: AN (1985–1998) S&P 500 component (until 1998)
- Industry: Fuel
- Predecessor: Standard Oil
- Founded: 1889, as part of the Standard Oil Trust
- Founder: John D. Rockefeller
- Defunct: December 31, 1998 (Corporation); 2002 (Fuel Brand)
- Fate: Merged with British Petroleum, becoming BP Amoco, and resurfaced as a station brand in 2017 selling BP fuel.
- Successor: BP Amoco
- Headquarters: Amoco Building, Chicago
- Website: Archived official website at the Wayback Machine (archived February 12, 1998)

Amoco (/ˈæməkoʊ/ AM-ə-koh) is a brand of fuel stations operating in the United States and owned by multinational conglomerate BP since 1998. The Amoco Corporation was an American chemical and oil company, founded by Standard Oil Company in 1889 around a refinery in Whiting, Indiana, and was officially the Standard Oil Company of Indiana until 1985. In 1911, it became an independent corporation as part of the break-up of the Standard Oil trust. Incorporated in Indiana, it was headquartered in Chicago.

In 1925, Standard Oil of Indiana absorbed the American Oil Company, founded in Baltimore in 1910, and incorporated in 1922, by Louis Blaustein and his son Jacob. The combined corporation operated or licensed gas stations under both the Standard name and the American or Amoco name (the latter from American Oil Company) and its logo using these names became a red, white and blue oval with a torch in the center. By the mid-twentieth century it was ranked the largest oil company in the United States. In 1985, it changed its corporate name to Amoco.

The firm's innovations included two essential parts of the modern industry, the gasoline tanker truck and the drive-through filling station. Its "Amoco Super-Premium" lead-free gasoline was marketed decades before environmental concerns led to the eventual phasing out of leaded gasoline throughout the United States. Amoco's headquarters were located in the Amoco Building (initially called the Standard Oil Building, and nicknamed "Big Stan", now the Aon Center) overlooking Grant Park in Chicago.

Amoco merged with British Petroleum in December 1998 to form BP Amoco, which was renamed BP in 2001. The Amoco name was branded at the gas pump for the highest 93 octane blends. The Deepwater Horizon oil spill of 2010 tarnished the BP brand in the US, resulting in the re-consideration of US branding. In October 2017, BP announced re-introduction of the Amoco branded stations to selected US markets. As of 2026, there were 1000 Amoco stations primarily in the eastern, midwestern and southern United States.

== History ==
=== Standard Oil of Indiana ===
Standard Oil of Indiana was formed in 1889 by John D. Rockefeller as part of the Standard Oil Trust. The company's operations centered around the Whiting Refinery situated on Lake Michigan, and first operational in 1890. In 1910, with the increased usage of the automobile, Indiana Standard decided to specialize in providing gasoline to consumers. In 1911, the year it became independent from the Standard Oil trust, the company sold 88% of the gasoline and kerosene sold in the Midwest. In 1912, it opened its first gas service station in Minneapolis, Minnesota.

When the Standard Oil Trust was broken up in 1911, Indiana Standard was assigned marketing territory covering most of the Midwestern United States, including Indiana, Michigan, Illinois, Wisconsin, Minnesota, North Dakota, South Dakota, Iowa, Kansas, and Missouri. It had the exclusive rights to use the Standard name in the region. Soon after, Indiana Standard scientist William Burton pioneered a new way to process crude oil, called thermal cracking, which allowed the industry to produce more oil. The company licensed the process to 14 companies between 1914 and 1919, including former parent company Standard Oil of New Jersey. The company opened its Casper refinery in 1914.

In 1918, Indiana Standard named Colonel Robert W. Stewart as its first chairman. Under Stewart, it began investing in other oil companies outside its Standard marketing territory, beginning with the purchase of the Dixie Oil Company of Louisiana in 1919 and a one-third interest in Midwest Refining in 1920. By June 1921, Standard Oil owned 85% of Midwest's stock.

By 1922, the company also had facilities in Sugar Creek, Missouri; Wood River, Illinois; and Greybull, and Laramie in Wyoming. The Casper facility was the largest volume gasoline refinery in the world by this time, turning 1.35 million barrels of crude oil per month into 615,000 barrels of gasoline. In the 1920s and 1930s, Indiana Standard opened up dozens more refining and oil-drilling facilities. Combined with a new oil-refining process, Indiana Standard created its exploration and production business, Stanolind, in 1931. In the following years, a period of intense exploration and search for oil-rich fields ensued; the company drilled over 1,000 wells in 1937 alone.

=== Purchase of American Oil Company ===
After working for Standard Oil, Blaustein eventually saved enough capital to found his own oil company with his son in 1910. They called it the American Oil Company (AMOCO). Blaustein incorporated his business in 1922.

In 1923, the Blausteins sold a half interest in American Oil to the Pan American Petroleum and Transport Company in exchange for a guaranteed supply of oil. Before this deal, Amoco was forced to depend on Standard Oil of New Jersey, a competitor, for its supplies. Standard Oil of Indiana acquired Pan American in 1925, beginning John D. Rockefeller's association with the Amoco name.

In the wake of the infamous Teapot Dome scandal, it was discovered that Harry Sinclair, Robert Stewart, Albert Fall, and others, had been laundering money through a shell company called Continental Trading Company and using the funds to buy more than $3 million in liberty bonds during World War I. Though Stewart was never charged with a crime, John D. Rockefeller Jr. demanded his resignation. After a lengthy proxy fight between the two, Stewart was eventually ousted in March 1929.

=== Pipelines and oil transport ===
In 1921–22, Indiana Standard bought a half interest in the Sinclair Pipe Line Company, a subsidiary of Sinclair Oil Corporation for $16,390,000, which owned a network of crude oil pipelines in the midwestern United States from Ranger, Texas, passing by Tulsa, Oklahoma, and Kansas City, Missouri, to East Chicago, Indiana (or in other words: to the Whiting, Indiana, refinery of Standard Oil). In 1925 Indiana Standard made a $36.7 million stake in the Pan American Petroleum and Transport Company gave the company interest in the American Oil Company, which marketed half of PAT's oil in the United States. Indiana Standard raised its stake in PAT to 81 percent by 1929. The two companies officially merged in 1954.

In 1930, Standard completed its acquisition of Sinclair Pipeline and also acquired the remaining half of Sinclair Crude Oil Purchasing Company. The two companies were renamed to Stanolind Pipeline Company and Stanolind Crude Oil Purchasing Company. The pipeline company headquarters were located in the Philcade building in Tulsa, Oklahoma. In 1950, all of the corporation's pipeline activities were merged into a single entity, which was named Service Pipeline Company. By 1964, the company operated 14,500 miles of pipelines located in the central part of the country. It gathered crude oil from 34,300 wells and carried it to 59 refineries, delivering 900,000 to 950,000 barrels a day.

=== Lead-free gasoline ===
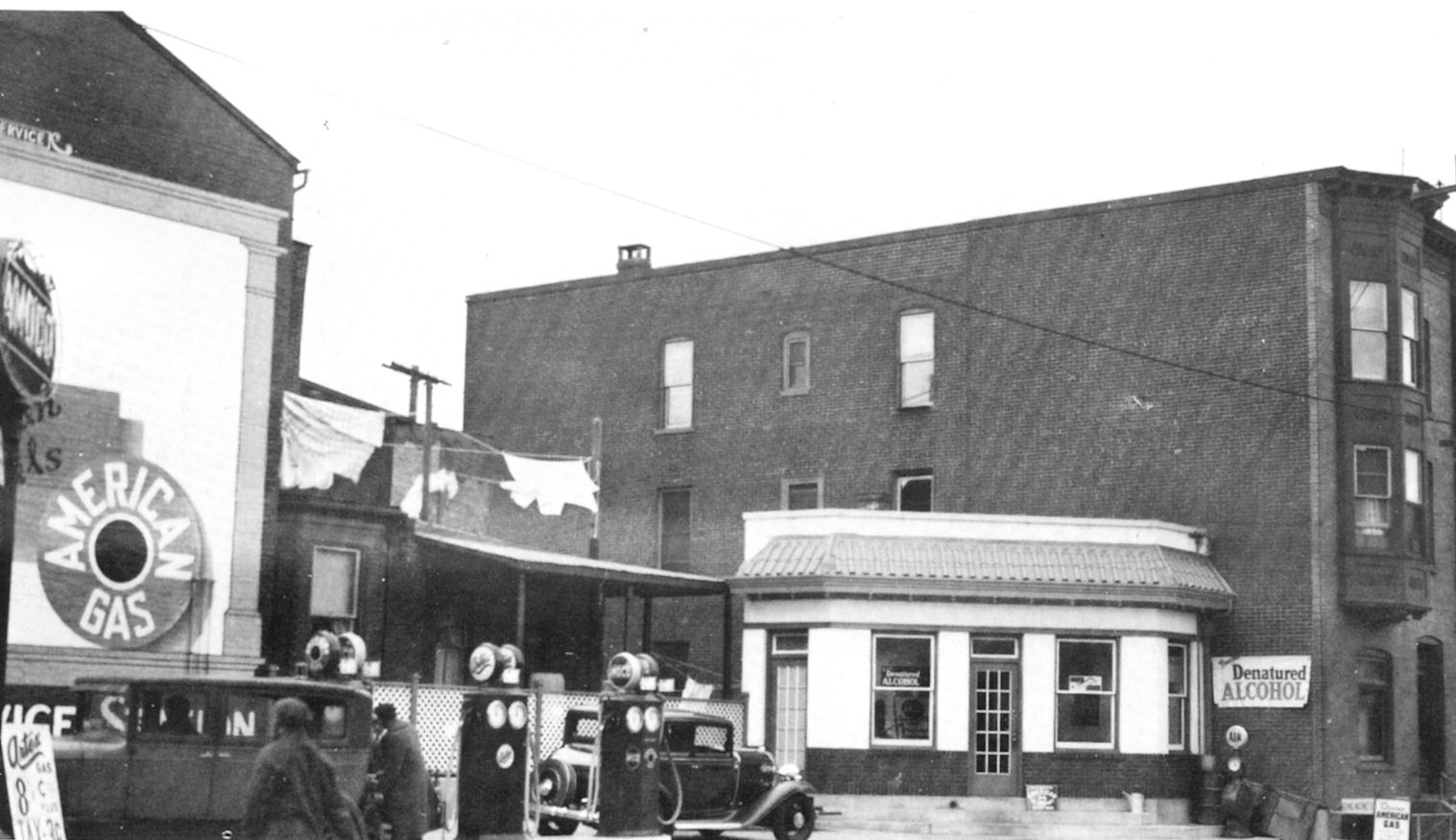
Amoco gas station in Pennsylvania, 1935

While most oil companies were switching to leaded gasolines en masse during the mid-to-late 1920s, American Oil chose to continue marketing its premium-grade "Amoco-Gas" (later Amoco Super-Premium) as a lead-free gasoline by using aromatics rather than tetraethyllead to increase octane levels. This was decades before the environmental movement of the early 1970s that led to more stringent auto-emission controls, which ultimately mandated the universal phase out of leaded gasoline.

The "Amoco" lead-free gasoline was sold at American's stations in the eastern and southern U.S. alongside American Regular gasoline, which was a leaded fuel. By 1970, lead-free Amoco was introduced in the Indiana Standard marketing area in 1970. The Red Crown Regular and White Crown Premium (later Gold Crown Super Premium) gasolines marketed by parent company Standard Oil (Indiana) in its prime marketing area in the Midwest before 1961, also contained lead. By 1978, Amoco had phased out premium lead gas.

In November 1986, amid pressures from the EPA to cut down on the usage of lead in gasoline, Amoco became the first major oil company to say it would quit all retail sales of leaded gasoline. In its place, Amoco began selling a mid-grade 89 octane unleaded gasoline (the same number as its leaded regular gasoline), along with its unleaded regular and unleaded premium offerings.

=== World War II ===
World War II followed this period of exploration; Indiana Standard participated in the war effort, discovering new means of refinement and even a way of producing TNT more quickly and easily. In addition, Indiana Standard significantly contributed to the aviation and land gasoline needed for the Allied armies. Also, during the war Indiana Standard created its chemical division, formed from the merger of the Pan American Chemicals Company and the Indoil Chemical Company.

=== Post-war ===
In the late 1940s, after World War II, Indiana Standard returned to focusing on domestic oil refinement and advancement. In 1947, Indiana Standard was the first company to drill off-shore, in the Gulf of Mexico, and in 1948, Stanolind Oil invented Hydrafrac, a hydraulic well fracturing process that increased oil production worldwide. Initially the Hydrafrac process was licensed exclusively to Halliburton.

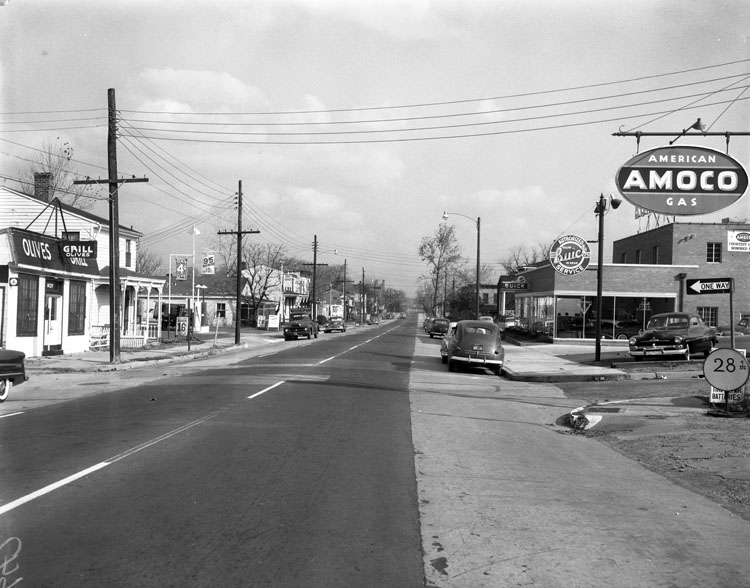
Amoco station in Richmond, 1954

By the early 1950s, Standard Oil of Indiana was ranked as the second-largest American oil company with annual gross sales of $1.5 billion. It had 12 refineries in the United States, marketed its products in 41 states, owned 12,000 miles (19,000 km) of crude oil pipelines, 10,000 miles (16,000 km) of trunk lines, and 1,700 miles (2,700 km) of product pipelines.

In October 1954, Standard Indiana opened its Mandan refinery in North Dakota under its American Oil Company subsidiary.

=== Business expansion ===
In the late 1950s and early 1960s, Indiana Standard began to diversify its assets. It again led the way with scientific and technological discoveries. Indiana Standard discovered PTA, a chemical for polyester fiber production. In 1968, following that discovery, Indiana Standard acquired the Avisun Corporation and Patchogue-Plymouth, forming the Amoco Fabrics and Fibers Company. By 1992, the company was trying to sell off its yarn factories in Alabama and Georgia.

The company's Amoco Foam Products subsidiary made polystyrene cups, plates, carrying trays and other products. The division was sold to Tenneco in June 1996.

=== Amoco ===
In 1956, the Pan-Am stations in the southeastern U.S. were rebranded as Amoco stations. In 1961, Indiana Standard reorganized its marketing giving its American Oil Company unit responsibility for its retail operations nationwide under the Standard name inside the Indiana Standard marketing area (Colorado, Illinois, Indiana, Iowa, Kansas, Michigan, Minnesota, Missouri, Montana, Nebraska, North Dakota, Oklahoma, South Dakota, Wisconsin, and Wyoming) and under the American name outside that region. Both brands shared the same redesigned torch and oval logo for easy identification nationwide. The Utoco (Utah Oil Company) name used in Indiana Standard's southwestern region was replaced by the American name. The Amoco name continued to be used outside the U.S. and as a brand on certain American Oil products.

Soon after, the company began to expand. With an exploration office in Canada, Indiana Standard was now an international gas company. Indiana Standard created several new plants and claimed various new oil fields in this time period, as the company prospered in the post-war boom.

By 1971, all the divisions of Indiana Standard bore the Amoco name including American Oil which was renamed Amoco Oil with American stations renamed Amoco stations. By 1975, Amoco began phasing in the Amoco name in the old Indiana Standard sales territory. Standard Oil Company (Indiana) was officially renamed Amoco Corporation in 1985. Facilities, like the one in Casper, were renamed using the new branding.

Phillips Petroleum's assets in the General American Oil Company, acquired in 1983, were later taken over by Amoco.

Carlin's Amoco Station was built at Roanoke, Virginia, around 1947; it was listed on the National Register of Historic Places in 2012.

=== Global expansion ===
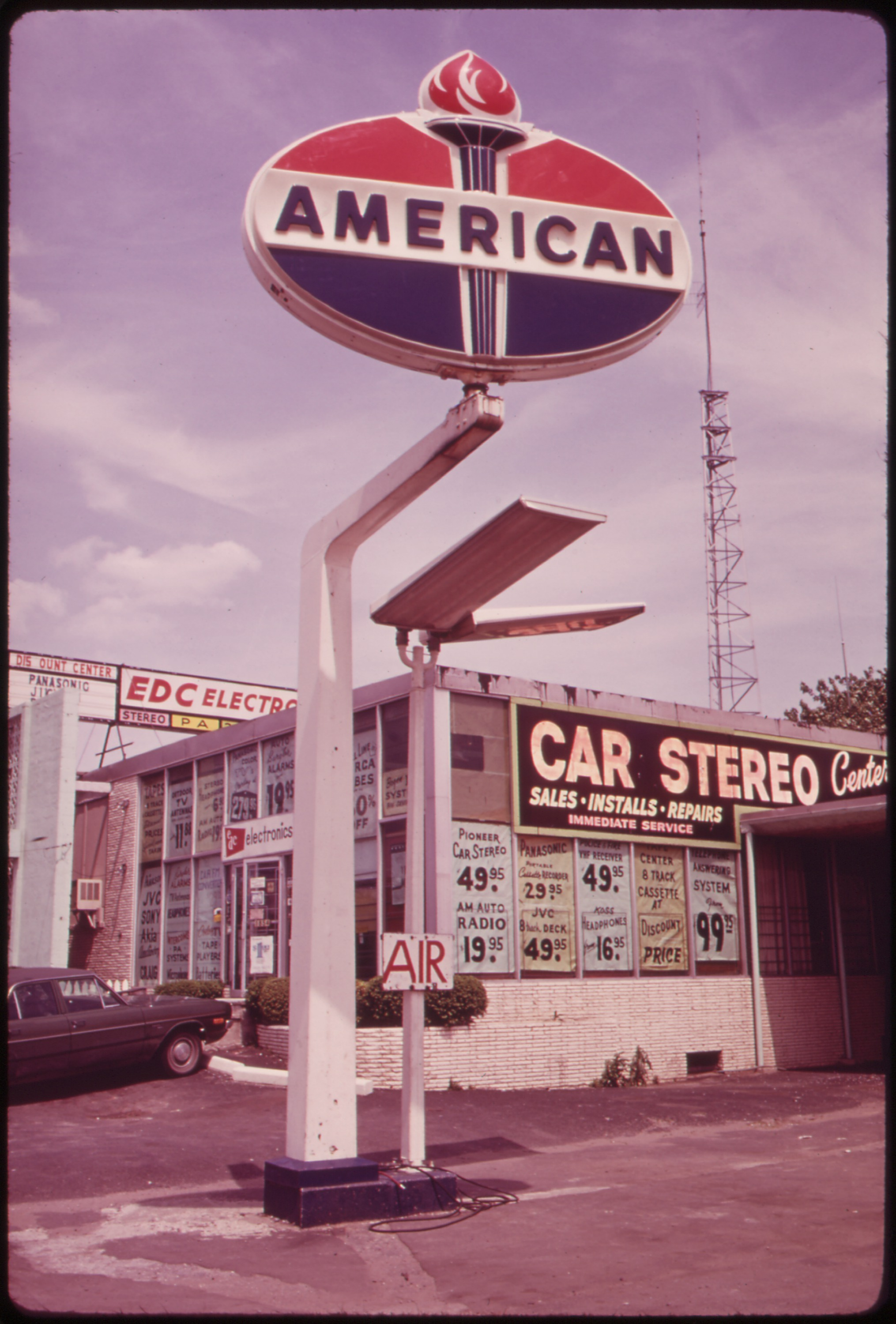
American station on Hylan Boulevard, NY City, 1973

Standard of Indiana established operations in Venezuela during the 1920s under dictator Juan Vicente Gomez. However, by 1932, during the worst of the Great Depression, the company sold its interests to Standard Oil of New Jersey.

In 1958, Indiana again went overseas by signing a deal with Iran to develop oil interests in the Middle Eastern country, this marked the company's first expansion into the Middle East. However, during the 1978 Iranian Revolution, Indiana faced significant challenges as political unrest escalated. The company swiftly shut down its Iranian operations and evacuated all American employees after they received death threats. This marked Amoco's complete withdrawal from Iran.

In the following decades, Amoco expanded globally, creating plants, oil wells, or markets in over 30 countries, including Italy, Australia (acquired by BP in 1984), Britain, Belgium, Brazil, Argentina, South Korea, Taiwan, Pakistan, Norway, Venezuela, Russia, China, Trinidad and Tobago, Egypt, West Germany. In addition, the company also acquired a division of Tenneco Oil Company and Dome Petroleum Limited becoming one of the world's largest oil companies.

In April 1981, reorganized Amoco Production, Amoco Oil, Amoco Chemicals, and Amoco Minerals—its four main units—into worldwide operating concerns. The Amoco International Oil Company was also merged into Amoco Production, with its refining and marketing operations transferred to Amoco Oil and its marine transportation operations made part of Indiana Standard's supply and technology department.

In July 1988, Amoco acquired Dome Petroleum, a Canadian company. By 1989, Amoco was the fifth-largest gasoline seller in the United States with more than 14,000 stations in 30 states.

In 1994 Amoco was involved in a consortium with nine other companies that signed an agreement with the government of Azerbaijan for exclusive rights to develop oil fields in the Caspian Sea. Also in 1994 Amoco combined with competitors Shell Oil and Exxon to construct a $1 billion offshore oil platform in the Gulf of Mexico, the deepest in the world at the time.

=== Merger with BP ===
By the end of the 1990s, worldwide oil prices had slumped to their lowest point in over a decade. Amoco, the fourth largest US oil producer at the time, reported a 50% fall in earnings in second quarter of 1998. Analysts believed Amoco was hurt by its lack of international refining. On August 11, 1998, Amoco announced it would merge with BP in the world's largest industrial merger.

Though billed as a merger of equals, BP held control of the new entity. Shareholder control was split 60/40 in favor of BP shareholders. The new company was also based in London, where BP was based, with BP chief executive Sir John Browne running the company. BP chairman Peter Sutherland and Amoco chairman Larry Fuller served as co-chairs. The consolidated company would also cut 6,000 jobs worldwide.

The new company made efforts to further consolidate by announcing the acquisition of Atlantic Richfield Company (ARCO) for $26.8 billion in April 1999. However, it wasn't until BP Amoco agreed to divest ARCO's Alaska holdings that the FTC approved the deal a year later. The company then cut 2,000 jobs.

In August 1999, BP Amoco sold its western Canadian oil properties for $1.1 billion, to Canadian Natural Resources ($690 million) and Penn West Petroleum ($410 million). In September 2001, BP Amoco sold its refineries in Salt Lake City and Mandan, North Dakota to Tesoro Petroleum.

Originally, the plan was for all US BP service stations to be converted to Amoco while all overseas Amoco service stations were to be converted to BP. But by 2000, BP announced that all Amoco service stations would either be closed or renamed to BP service stations, including the remaining stations still bearing the "Standard" name. The final Amoco branded stations opened in 2002. The first Amoco station to become a BP was a newly built station with a BP Connect convenience store and Wild Bean Cafe at the Northeast Corner of Meridian Street and Meridian School Road in Indianapolis on January 9, 2001. The peak of the conversions were between 2002 and 2004. The last Amoco stations were in Lake Villa, Illinois in August 2008, Jersey City, New Jersey in the Spring of 2009, and one on Germantown Pike in Whitemarsh Township, Pennsylvania which changed to BP in 2013. BP also chose to rename its gasolines with the Amoco name, changing its midgrade and premium offerings to the Silver and Ultimate brandings that Amoco used. By 2008, the "Amoco Fuels" name had been mostly discontinued in favor of "BP Gasoline with Invigorate". The Amoco name, however, lives on as BP continues to sell Silver and Ultimate under the BP name.

In addition, a few BP stations continued operation under the Amoco name. Most were either converted to BP, demolished and replaced with BP-style stations, abandoned, or switched to competitor brands. On April 1, 2010, in Mississippi, Chevron purchased some BP gas stations, which had been Amoco, to convert them to the Texaco brand.

In the aftermath of the Deepwater Horizon oil spill in the Gulf of Mexico, there were reports in the press that BP was reconsidering rebranding itself as Amoco in the US. Some independently owned BP stations, including former Amoco stations, switched to a different brand due to the public relations fallout as a result of the oil spill.

== Corporate image ==
=== Logos ===
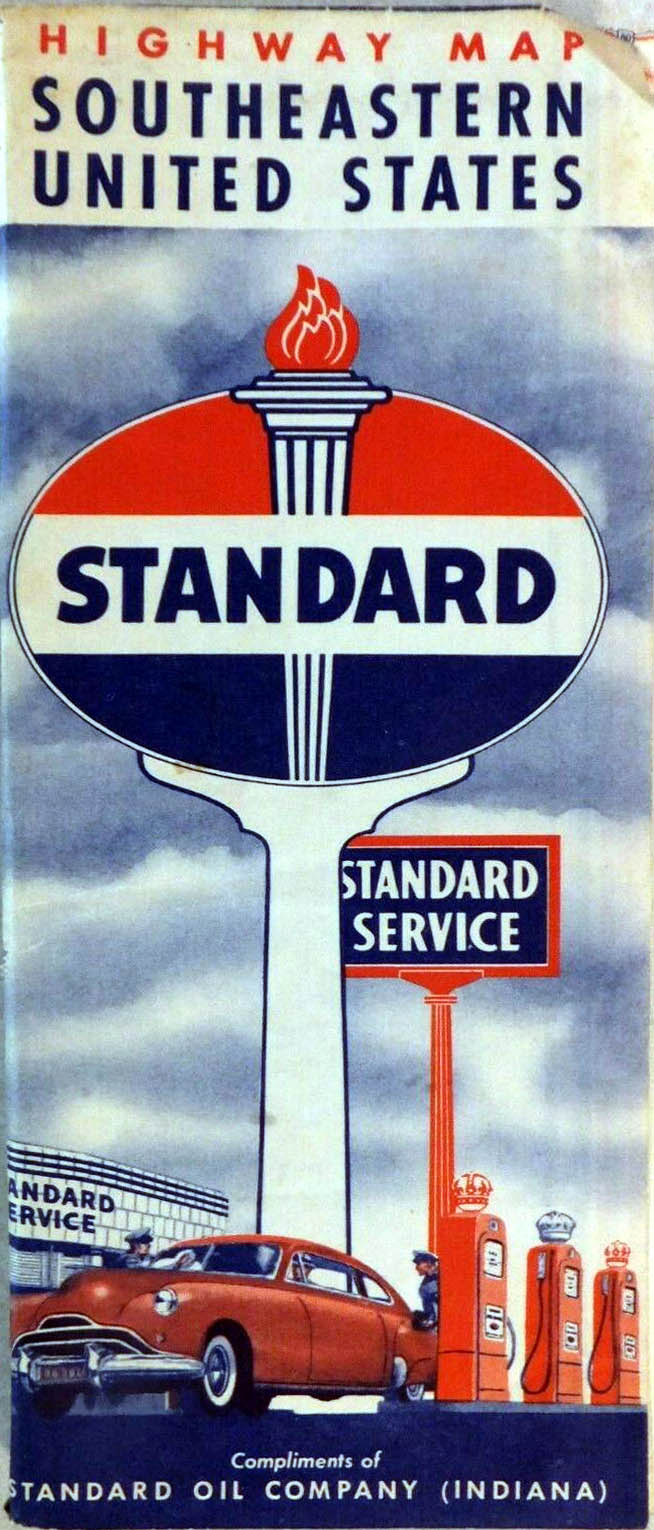
The first "torch & oval" logo used 1947–1960, here on a highway map

The first Indiana Standard logo was unveiled in 1926, after a competition. The logo featured a circle, representing strength, stability, and dependability, with the words "Standard Oil Company (Indiana)" in red. The inner circle represents the cycle of service to customers. The word Service was written in the inside of the circles. In addition, the logo also had a torch with a flame, symbolizing progress. This logo appeared on gas station buildings. The roadside sign was a blue rectangle saying "STANDARD SERVICE" in white block letters.

Concurrently, American Oil introduced in 1932 a logo which was the first to bear the name "Amoco". It featured an ellipse divided into three sections horizontally; the top and bottom were red, and the middle had a black background with white lettering. This logo was used in the northeastern U.S.

A new logo was developed by Indiana Standard and introduced in 1946. It combined the Standard torch with the Amoco oval. The oval colors were, from top to bottom, red, white, and blue. The new logo was called the "Torch and Oval (T&O)". In parts of the country where the company could not use the name "Standard", the logo read "Utoco" (Utah Oil Company) or "Pan-Am". When the "Pan-Am" name was replaced by "Amoco", it marked the first time the torch and oval was used with the Amoco name. The red and black logo continued to be used in the northeast and maps distributed by Amoco in the late 1950s through 1960 showed both logos.

1961–1970 Standard logo. Logo bore the "AMERICAN" name outside the Indiana Standard marketing area

In 1961, the torch and oval was redesigned with a flatter oval and a more contemporary torch design with the logo bearing the Standard or American name in the U.S. and the Amoco name outside the U.S.

The next updated logo, in 1971, enhanced the previous one. It featured a blue bottom and a sleeker-looking torch. In addition, the word "Standard" became italicized and thicker. This was used by Midwestern station owners who had the option of using the Amoco name (more familiar in the East and South) or using the more familiar Standard name. Owners used it until they were converted to BP or another franchise. In the 1970s, both the Standard and Amoco brand icons were used on products (such as Amoco Roadmaps, Amoco Motorclub, and the Amaco Credit Card).

The final logo of the original Amoco, used until 2002

The final Amoco logo of the company simply changed the name on the logo to "Amoco". The logo featured the familiar torch and divided ellipse. A horizontal logo was also used, with the italicized word "Amoco" featuring trailing red, white, and blue horizontal stripes, taken from the divided ellipse of the Amoco logo. This logo was used primarily on pumps and service station canopies.

After the rebrand, for a time the Amoco brand was retained as a sub-brand to the main BP helios logo, mainly in the form of the horizontal logo (used on signage as a smaller element beneath the price displays); the black background was replaced with green, to symbolize the new parent company.

Although a few Amoco stations still use their former logo, most have since been converted to the BP livery. In St. Louis, Missouri, the largest Amoco sign in the world, both before and after the company's demise, still stands. It stands at the intersection of Clayton Road, Skinker Boulevard, McCausland Avenue, and Interstate 64 (near the southwest corner of Forest Park, home of the St. Louis Zoo, the Saint Louis Art Museum and other prominent attractions). It is visible up to two miles away on the interstate. Most surviving Amoco stations are kept so BP can continue holding the trademarks for Amoco and Standard.

In May 2008, United States BP stations mostly discontinued use of the "Amoco Fuels" logo as BP introduced its new brand of fuel, "BP Gasoline with Invigorate". BP still uses the Silver and Amoco Ultimate brands for its midgrade and premium gasolines. For the 2017 revival (see below), the Amoco logo got a new, modernized refresh to its "torch and oval" image.

=== Sponsorship ===
In 1968–1972, (as American Oil Company) the company sponsored the American Freeway Patrol (AFP) in the metropolitan San Diego area as part of an expansion of service stations into Southern California. The American Freeway Patrol cruised the freeways and assisted disabled motorists free of charge, and provided helicopter traffic reports for local radio stations which was groundbreaking at the time. Don Langford, with KFWB (AM) Los Angeles, joined the American Freeway Patrol, San Diego, as traffic reporter on KOGO-AM-FM, KSON (AM), KITT (FM) San Diego, and KMLO (AM) Vista.

In 1976, Amoco (under the "Standard" name) sponsored the Barney Oldfield Speedway attraction at Marriott's Great America theme park in Gurnee, Illinois. Although the sponsorship deal ended when Marriott sold the park to Six Flags in 1985, the Standard logo can still be seen on all of the Barney Oldfield Speedway (now Great America Raceway) cars.

In 1988, legendary racer Mario Andretti drove the Amoco Ultimate Lola/Chevrolet for Newman/Haas Racing in the Indianapolis 500 and throughout the season in the CART IndyCar World Series. Andretti provided great publicity for Amoco by winning races at Phoenix and Cleveland that year, part of his 52 career IndyCar wins. Andretti also appeared in Amoco television commercials that aired in local race markets as part of the IndyCar sponsorship campaign.

Dave Blaney drove a #93 Pontiac Grand Prix/Dodge Intrepid under Amoco sponsorship in the NASCAR Winston Cup Series and NASCAR Busch Series from 1997 until the brand's demise in 2001.

== Incidents ==
On August 27, 1955, the Whiting refinery suffered a devastating fire when a processing tower exploded. The fire lasted eight days, consumed 45 acres of storage tanks, and damaged nearby homes and businesses. In all, two people were killed, another 40 were injured, and 1,500 were evacuated. By the following year, the facility was repaired and the company had purchased much of the surrounding area in order to expand.

In November 1978, abnormally high temperatures were detected in fuel tanks in the basement of an Amoco gas station in Centralia, Pennsylvania, owned by then-mayor John Coddington. The source was determined to be the town's ongoing mine fire. To prevent risk of the fuel igniting, the gasoline in the tanks was drained. The gas station was shuttered in December 1979, and demolished on November 9, 1981.

On March 16, 1978, the very large crude carrier Amoco Cadiz ran ashore just north of Landunvez, Finistère, Brittany, France, causing one of the largest oil spills in history. Amoco was ordered by a federal judge Charles Norgle in a 1990 ruling to pay $120 million in damages and restitution to France.

On October 21, 1980, an explosion at an Amoco plant in New Castle, Delaware, killed six people, caused $46 million in property damage, and eventually led to the loss of 300 jobs.

In the 1980s and 1990s, six former Amoco chemical engineers at the firm's Naperville, Illinois, research campus developed a deadly form of brain cancer. Researchers who conducted a three-year study of the cancer cluster determined that the cancer cases were workplace-related, but they could not identify the source of the workers' ailments. In June 2010, BP demolished Building 503, where the employees had worked. According to a company spokesperson, the building was "underused", and "required upgrades the company deemed too expensive". Heirs of one of the cancer-stricken workers won a $2.75 million suit against BP Amoco in 2000.

== Brand relaunch ==
Amoco (brand)

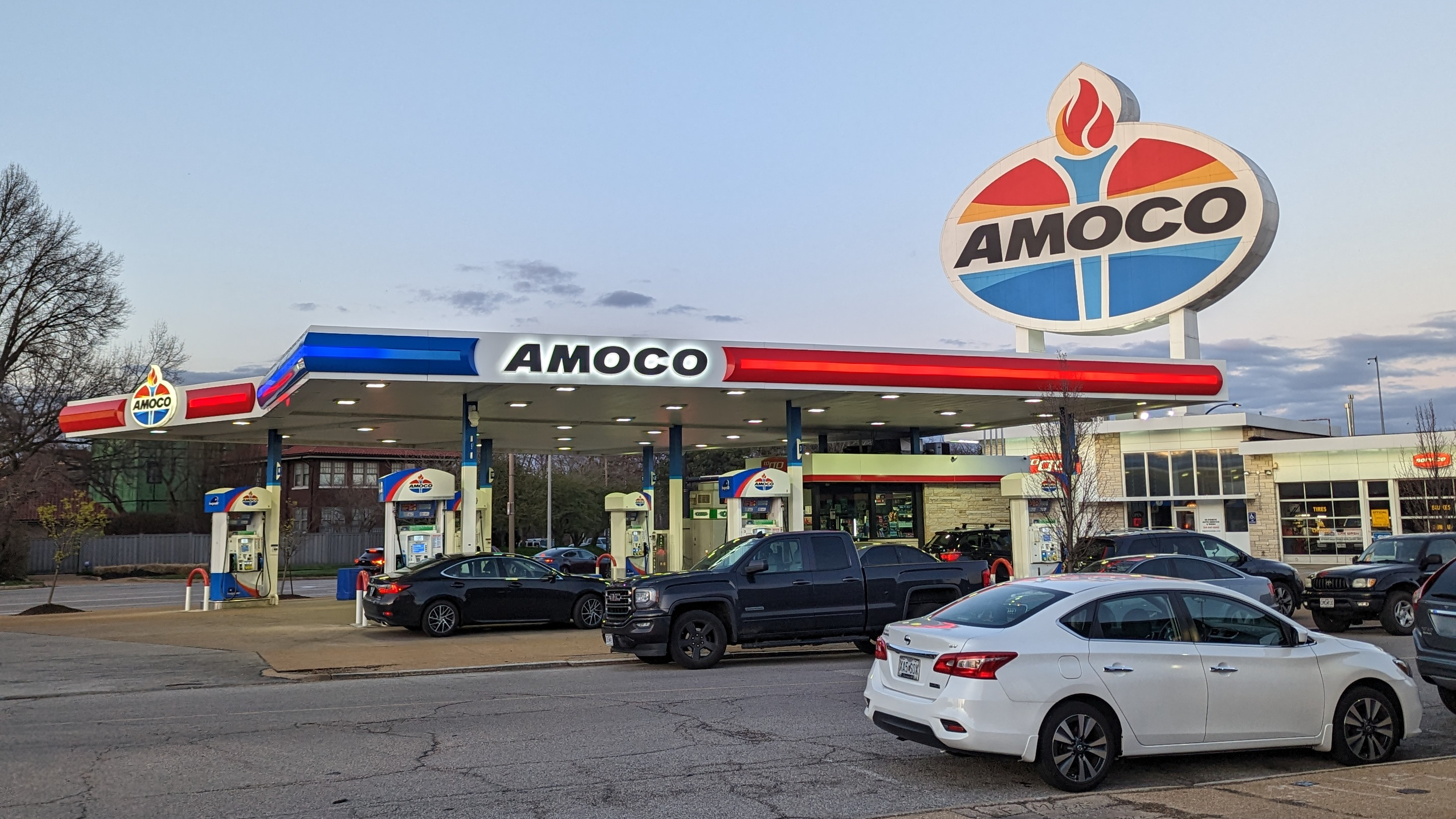
- Amoco gas station in St. Louis, 2023
- Product type: Service stations
- Current owner: BP
- Country: United States
- Introduced: October 10, 2017; 9 years ago
- Markets: mainly eastern half of the United States

It was announced on October 10, 2017, that BP would bring the Amoco name back, after an absence of almost a decade. BP had said the first station would relaunch in 2017. Its intention for relaunching the name was to capture more of the U.S. fuel industry.

As such, aside from the aforementioned St. Louis station with the large Amoco sign as well as a few other isolated instances, most newer Amoco stations were converted from competitor brands as opposed to BP.

As three of BP's Big Oil competitors already sold gasoline under multiple brands that were once competitors (ExxonMobil with Exxon & Mobil, Chevron with its namesake brand & Texaco, and Phillips 66 with its namesake brand, Conoco, & 76), this left Shell Oil Company as the only Big Oil company to sell gasoline under one brand.

Several Gulf stations were rechristened as Amoco stations on Long Island, New York, starting in November 2017.

The Amoco brand returned to the Pittsburgh market in fall 2020, when locally based Coen Markets announced a marketing deal with BP to sell Amoco-branded gasoline at all of its fuel-offering locations. As most of Coen's stores were already selling BP gasoline (with a small handful having been Amoco stations before BP), this marked the largest switchover from BP to Amoco since the brand's reintroduction, though a few Coen stations were also selling Exxon, Sunoco, and Citgo prior to the deal. While the deal didn't affect BP as a whole, as BP lost several stations in the market to Marathon Petroleum years before, it essentially relegated the BP brand to 7-Eleven stations in the market as well as a few independent operators.

Following the acquisition of TravelCenters of America in May 2023, BP began converting all pumps to either BP or Amoco branding. In February 2024, there were 675 Amoco gas stations in the United States. In May 2025, Amoco has 900 stations across the United States.

== Leadership ==
=== President ===
1. William P. Cowan, 1911–1918
2. Lauren J. Drake, 1918
3. William Merriam Burton, 1919–1927
4. Edward George Seubert, 1927–1945
5. Alonzo William Peake, 1945–1955
6. Frank Oscar Prior, 1955–1958
7. John Eldred Swearingen Jr., 1958–1965
8. Dr. Robert Charles Gunness, 1965–1974
9. George Vincent Myers, 1974–1978
10. Richard Martin Morrow, 1978–1983
11. Harry Laurance Fuller, 1983–1995
12. William G. Lowrie, 1996–1998

=== Chairman of the Board ===
1. Col. Robert Wright Stewart, 1918–1929
2. Robert Erastus Wilson, 1945–1958
3. Frank Oscar Prior, 1958–1960
4. John Eldred Swearingen Jr., 1965–1983
5. Richard Martin Morrow, 1983–1991
6. Harry Laurance Fuller, 1991–1998

== See also ==
- ARCO
- Exxon
