= Missouri Route 17 =

State highway in Missouri, U.S.

Route 17

Route information
- Maintained by MoDOT
- Length: 185 mi (298 km)
- Existed: 1922–present

Major junctions
- North end: US 54 in Eugene
- US 63 in West Plains; US 160 in West Plains; US 60 in Mountain View; US 63 in Houston; I-44 in Buckhorn
- South end: AR 395 at the Arkansas state line in Lanton

Location
- Country: United States
- State: Missouri

Highway system
- Missouri State Highway System; Interstate; US; State; Supplemental
← Route 16	→ Route 18

Route 17 is a highway in central and southern Missouri. Its northern terminus is at U.S. Route 54 in Eugene, located six miles (10 km) northeast of Eldon; its southern terminus is at the Arkansas state line where it continues into Arkansas as Highway 395. Between Waynesville and east of Laquey, part of the road was historic U.S. Route 66. South of Interstate 44, Route 17 enters the Mark Twain National Forest and passes through the western edge of Fort Leonard Wood.

Originally, Route 17 terminated at Mountain View.

== Major intersections ==
County	Location	mi	km	Destinations	Notes
Howell				AR 395 south	Arkansas state line
Howell	Lanton			Route 142 – Bakersfield, Thayer	
Howell	West Plains			US 63 south (Jan Howard Expressway) – Koshkonong, West Plains	south end of US 63 overlap
Howell	West Plains			US 160 west (Preacher Roe Boulevard) – Norfork Lake, Gainesville, Bull Shoals Lake	south end of US 160 overlap
Howell	West Plains			US 63 north (Jan Howard Expressway) / Route CC west (Gibson Avenue) – Pomona, Hammond Camp	north end of US 63 overlap
Howell	West Plains			US 63 Bus. (Porter Wagoner Boulevard)	
Howell				US 160 east – Alton	north end of US 160 overlap
Howell	Mountain View			US 60 west	south end of US 60 overlap
Howell				US 60 east – Birch Tree	north end of US 60 overlap
Texas	Summersville			Route 106 east / Route 88 – Alley Spring, Eminence	Southern overlap of route 88.
Texas				Route 137 south – Willow Springs	south end of Route 137 overlap
Texas	Yukon			Route 137 north – Raymondville	north end of Route 137 overlap
Texas	Houston			US 63 south (Sam Houston Boulevard) – Cabool	south end of US 63 overlap
Texas	Houston			US 63 north – Licking	north end of US 63 overlap
Texas				Route 38 west / Route 88 – Hartville, Barnes P.F. Conservation Area	eastern terminus of route 38, northern overlap of route 88.
Texas	Success			Route 32 east – Licking	south end of Route 32 overlap
Texas	Roby			Route 32 west – Plato	north end of Route 32 overlap
Laclede	No major junctions				
Pulaski				Route AB west / Historic US 66 west to I-44 – Hazelgreen	south end of Historic US 66 overlap
Pulaski	Buckhorn			I-44 – Springfield, Rolla	I-44 exit 153
Pulaski	Waynesville			I-44 BL west to I-44	south end of I-44 Bus. overlap
Pulaski	Waynesville			I-44 BL east / Historic US 66 east – Fort Leonard Wood	north end of I-44 Bus. / Historic US 66 overlap
Pulaski	Crocker			Route 133 south – Richland	south end of Route 133 overlap
Pulaski	Crocker			Route 133 north – Hancock, Dixon	north end of Route 133 overlap
Miller	Iberia			Route 42 – Brumley, Vienna	
Miller				Route 52 east – St. Elizabeth	south end of Route 52 overlap
Miller	Tuscumbia			Route 52 west to US 54 – Eldon	north end of Route 52 overlap
Miller				Route H – Mary's Home	
Cole	Eugene			US 54 – Eldon, Jefferson City	Interchange
1.000 mi = 1.609 km; 1.000 km = 0.621 mi
