= Business routes of Interstate 44 =

Interstate 44 Business

Location
- Country: United States
- State: Missouri

Highway system
- Interstate Highway System; Main; Auxiliary; Suffixed; Business; Future; Missouri State Highway System; Interstate; US; State; Supplemental
← I-44	→ Route 44

Nine business routes of Interstate 44 (I-44) exist, all of them within the state of Missouri.

== Joplin business loop ==
Interstate 44 Business
- Location: Newton and Jasper counties

Interstate 44 Business (I-44 Bus.) in Joplin runs north from I-44 along Main Street until it reaches Route 66 (7th Street), where it turns east. It then runs through Duquesne and Duenweg. I-44 Bus. has a diamond interchange with Route 249 between Duquesne and Duenweg.

I-44 Bus. is concurrent with other highways for its entire length. From the highway's western terminus to downtown Joplin it is concurrent with Route 43. In downtown Joplin, the highway then turns east onto 7th Street and runs concurrent with Route 66 until I-44/I-49/US 71 near Scotland. It follows the old alignment of US 71.

Major intersections

County	Location	mi	km	Destinations	Notes
Newton	Joplin	0.0	0.0	I-44 / Route 43 south – Tulsa, OK, Springfield; Route 86 (Glendale Boulevard) / 50th Street – Racine	Western terminus; west end of Route 43 overlap; road continues as Route 86; access to Mercy Hospital Joplin via 50th Street; I-44 exit 6
Jasper	Joplin	3.4	5.5	Route 43 north (Main Street) / Route 66 west / Historic US 66 west (7th Street)	East end of Route 43 overlap; west end of Route 66/Historic US 66 overlap
Jasper	Joplin	5.4	8.7	I-49 BL / Historic US 66 east (Range Line Road)	East end of Historic US 66 overlap
Jasper	Duenweg	8.2	13.2	Route 249 to I-44 / I-49 – Carterville	Diamond interchange
Jasper	Scotland	11.0	17.7	I-44 east / I-49 north / US 71 north – Springfield, Kansas City Route 66 ends	Eastern terminus; I-44 exit 15
1.000 mi = 1.609 km; 1.000 km = 0.621 mi: Concurrency terminus

== Sarcoxie business loop ==
Interstate 44 Business
- Location: Sarcoxie

Interstate 44 Business (I-44 Bus.) through Sarcoxie begins running south from I-44 concurrent with Route 37. It then splits off at Blackberry Street, which becomes High Street upon entering Sarcoxie. After leaving the town, I-44 Bus. angles northeast and ends at I-44. This road is part of former U.S. Route 166 (US 166), which preceded I-44 through the area.

== Mount Vernon business loop ==
Interstate 44 Business
- Location: Mount Vernon

Interstate 44 Business (I-44 Bus.) in Mount Vernon runs along Mount Vernon Road. The east half of the highway is concurrent with Route 39. I-44 Bus. runs largely along the former route of US 166.

== Springfield business loop ==
Interstate 44 Business
- Location: Springfield

Interstate 44 Business (I-44 Bus.) in Springfield begins at the eastern terminus of Route 266 and runs east along Chestnut Expressway, intersecting US 160 and Route 13. It then runs along the north edge of downtown Springfield. I-44 Bus. turns north at Glenstone Avenue, concurrent with U.S. Route 65 Business (US 65 Bus.). It then ends where Glenstone meets I-44. Major intersections

The entire route is in Springfield, Greene County.

mi	km	Destinations	Notes
		Route 266 west	Continuation beyond I-44
		I-44 – Joplin, Rolla	Western terminus; I-44 exit 72
		US 160 (Northwest Bypass)	
		Route 13	
		US 65 Bus. (Glenstone Avenue/Chestnut Expressway)	I-44 Business turns north; 65 Bus to the south and east
		Route 744	
		I-44 – Joplin, Rolla	Eastern terminus; I-44 exit 80
		Glenstone Ave	Continuation beyond I-44
1.000 mi = 1.609 km; 1.000 km = 0.621 mi: Concurrency terminus; Incomplete access; Route transition

== Lebanon business loop ==
Interstate 44 Business
- Location: Lebanon

Interstate 44 Business (I-44 Bus.) in Lebanon began at the westernmost Lebanon exit and ended at the easternmost exit. The route followed former US 66 for its entire length. I-44 Bus. followed Springfield Road, then curved off and became Elm Street. At Jefferson Street, it finally junctioned with Route 5, Route 32, and Route 64. The designation was removed in 2021.

Major intersections

The entire route was in Lebanon, Laclede County.

mi	km	Destinations	Notes
		Elm Street	Continuation beyond I-44
		I-44 – Springfield, Rolla	Western terminus; I-44 exit 127
		Springfield Road	
		Route 32 west (Jackson Avenue)	Western end of Route 32 concurrency
		Route 32 east / Route 5 / Route 64 (Jefferson Avenue)	Eastern end of Route 32 concurrency
		Washington Avenue	
		Millcreek Road / Booton Avenue	
		I-44 – Springfield, Rolla	Eastern terminus; I-44 exit 130
		Route MM east (Millcreek Road) to Cowan Drive	Continuation beyond I-44
1.000 mi = 1.609 km; 1.000 km = 0.621 mi: Concurrency terminus; Incomplete access; Route transition

== Waynesville–St. Robert business loop ==
Interstate 44 Business
- Location: Waynesville–St. Robert

Interstate 44 Business (I-44 Bus.) in the Waynesville–St. Robert area begins on the westside of Waynesville at exit 156. The road briefly heads north on Ichord Avenue, then heads east on a concurrency with Route 17. The road, at this point, also becomes Historic Route 66. I-44 Bus. continues east, past the Pulaski County Courthouse in the old part of the city (where Route 17 turns off north). The route then climbs a steep hill and rounds a curve underneath a rock overhang painted like a frog. I-44 Bus. continues into St. Robert, and the lanes split with a Roadside Park between them. It passes on through St. Robert, ending at exit 161, which is also the exit for the Fort Leonard Wood I-44 business spur.

Major intersections

The entire route is in Pulaski County.

Location	mi	km	Destinations	Notes
Waynesville	0.00	0.00	Route H – Ft. Leonard Wood	Continuation south beyond I-44
Waynesville	0.00	0.00	I-44 – Rolla, Springfield	Western terminus; I-44 exit 156
Waynesville	0.6	0.97	Route 17 south (Incident By-Pass Route west) – Buckhorn	South end of Route 17 concurrency; former US 66 west
Waynesville	2.4	3.9	Route 17 north – Crocker	North end of Route 17 concurrency
St. Robert	4.3	6.9	I-44 – Rolla, Springfield	I-44 exit 159
St. Robert	5.7	9.2	I-44 BS south – Ft. Leonard Wood	Northern terminus of I-44 Bus.
St. Robert	5.8	9.3	I-44 – Springfield, Rolla	Eastern terminus; I-44 exit 161
St. Robert	5.8	9.3	Route Y	Continuation north beyond I-44
1.000 mi = 1.609 km; 1.000 km = 0.621 mi: Concurrency terminus

== Fort Leonard Wood business spur ==
Interstate 44 Business
- Location: St. Robert–Fort Leonard Wood

Interstate 44 Business (I-44 Bus.) is a short route connecting the Waynesville–St. Robert I-44 business loop with the main north gate of Fort Leonard Wood. The highway is lined with businesses and is also called Missouri Avenue, whose name continues into Fort Leonard Wood. It is an old alignment of Route 17.

Major intersections

The entire route is in St. Robert, Pulaski County.

mi	km	Destinations	Notes
0.0	0.0	Ft. Leonard Wood entrance gate	Southern terminus
2.1	3.4	Route Z / I-44 BL to I-44 / Route Y	Northern terminus; Missouri Avenue continues north as I-44 Bus. east
1.000 mi = 1.609 km; 1.000 km = 0.621 mi

== Rolla business loop ==
Interstate 44 Business
- Location: Rolla

Interstate 44 Business (I-44 Bus.) in Rolla begins at the westernmost Rolla exit and ends at the easternmost exit. The route follows former US 66 its entire length. The road is Kingshighway to Bishop Avenue, where the road joins northbound US 63, with which it is concurrent to I-44. Near the Missouri University of Science and Technology is a model of Stonehenge.

== Pacific business loop ==
Interstate 44 Business
- Location: Pacific
- Existed: 1979–present

Interstate 44 Business (I-44 Bus.) is a former routing of US 66 through downtown Pacific. This portion of road was designated a business loop of I-44 after the Interstate was built to bypass the town. US 50 was then rerouted onto I-44, making this portion a business loop after US 66 was removed from the area in 1979. After I-44 Bus.'s western terminus, the road continues solely as Historic Route 66 until an intersection with Route 100.
