= Arkansas Highway 395 =

State highway in Arkansas, United States

Highway 395

Route information
- Maintained by AHTD

Southern segment
- Length: 3.00 mi (4.83 km)
- South end: Byron Road south of Salem
- North end: US 62 / US 412 in Salem

Northern segment
- Length: 10.43 mi (16.79 km)
- South end: AR 9 in Salem
- North end: Route 17 northeast of Moko

Location
- Country: United States
- State: Arkansas
- Counties: Fulton

Highway system
- Arkansas Highway System; Interstate; US; State; Business; Spurs; Suffixed; Scenic; Heritage
← AR 394	→ AR 396

Arkansas Highway 395 (AR 395) is a state highway made up of two sections, both of which are in Fulton County. The southern segment is a 3-mile-long (4.8 km) spur route that begins southwest of Salem and ends at U.S. Route 62 (US 62) / US 412 in Salem. The northern segment begins on the northeastern side of Salem at Highway 9 and travels north and east to the Missouri state line, where it becomes Missouri Route 17.

== Southern segment ==
Highway 395 begins at a begin/end state maintenance sign southwest of Salem; the highway continues southwest as Byron Road. From its beginning, the route heads to the northeast towards Salem, along the winding Byron Road. On the southwestern side of Salem, the highway ends at U.S. 62 / U.S. 412.

Major intersections

The entire highway is in Fulton County.

Location	mi	km	Destinations	Notes
	0.00	0.00	Byron Road	End state maintenance
Salem	3.00	4.83	US 62 / US 412	
1.000 mi = 1.609 km; 1.000 km = 0.621 mi

== Northern segment ==
Highway 395 reemerges on the northeast side of Salem near the Fulton County Hospital at an intersection with Highway 9. From Salem it heads north, roughly parallel to the south fork of the Spring River. It passes through a mix of grassland and forest, with a few houses dotted along the way. At the small community of Moko, Highway 395 briefly turns to the east before curving back to the north. At the Missouri state line, the designation ends, but the highway continues as Missouri Route 17.

Major intersections

The entire highway is in Fulton County.

Location	mi (Note: Mileposts along this segment are inventoried from north to south.)	km	Destinations	Notes
Salem	10.43	16.79	AR 9	
	0.00	0.00	Route 17	
1.000 mi = 1.609 km; 1.000 km = 0.621 mi
