= Scotland, Missouri =

Unincorporated community in Missouri, U.S.

- Unincorporated community
- Interactive map of Scotland, Missouri
- Coordinates: 37°04′59″N 94°22′38″W
- Country: United States
- State: Missouri
- County: Jasper

Scotland is an unincorporated community in Jasper County, Missouri, United States. It is located slightly northwest of the junction of Missouri Route 66 and Interstate 44/US 71.

Scotland, named by Allen Scott (1812 – 1881) a farmer and minister who laid off the town in 1873 on land that had been his family farm. The original plat comprised sixty lots. Lots 1 to 48 inclusive were 50 by 120 feet (15 m × 37 m), and 49 to 60 were 50 by 180 feet (15 m × 55 m).Specifically the plat would be described as follows: situated on the southeast quarter of the southwest quarter of section 1, in township 27 north, range 32 west of fifth principal meridian. Scotland's palmiest days were during the lead excitement there a few years later. At its height, there was one hotel, a mill, a store or two, and a store and post office run by Mr. Patrick (Allen's son in law).

A post office called Scotland was established in 1873, and remained in operation until 1908. The community may derive its name from Benjamin Scott, a local minister who was the son of Allen Scott.
