= Missouri Route 755 =

Former proposed highway in Missouri

Route 755
- Proposed Route 755 corridor highlighted in red

Route information
- Length: 4 mi (6.4 km)

Major junctions
- South end: I-44 / I-55 in St. Louis
- I-64 / US 40 in St. Louis
- North end: I-70 in St. Louis

Location
- Country: United States
- State: Missouri

Highway system
- Missouri State Highway System; Interstate; US; State; Supplemental

Route 755 was a proposed state highway entirely in the city limits of St. Louis, Missouri, that was never built due to local objections. Its northern terminus was to be at an interchange with Interstate 70 (I-70) in the northeastern part of the city and its southern terminus was at an interchange with I-44/I-55. It would have had an interchange with I-64/U.S. Route 40 along the way. The road was proposed as a freeway bypassing the downtown area of St. Louis and would have provided the currently missing connections of northbound I-44/I-55 to westbound I-64 and eastbound I-64 to westbound I-44/I-55 or westbound I-70. It also was to be signed Interstate 755 (I-755).

Route 755 was partially built, in the form of large flyover ramps between I-44/I-55 and I-64/US 40, which lead to local streets. These large interchanges have excess right of way, as well as unused pavement segments. Truman Parkway and long exits to Lafayette Avenue and 20th, Chestnut, Market, and Pine Streets were all that was built of the once proposed and since canceled Route 755. The ramps from I-64 were closed in February 2020 and removed that winter to make way for a new soccer stadium.
