= Jacob Blaustein =

American businessman and diplomat (1892–1970)

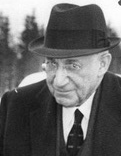
- Blaustein in 1965

U.S. Delegate to the United Nations
- In office September 30, 1955 – January 20, 1969
- President: Dwight D. Eisenhower; John F. Kennedy; Lyndon B. Johnson

Consultative Delegate to the United Nations Conference on International Organization
- In office March 20, 1945 – June 26, 1945
- President: Franklin Delano Roosevelt; Harry S. Truman

Personal details
- Born: September 30, 1892 Baltimore, Maryland, U.S.
- Died: November 15, 1970 (aged 78) Baltimore, Maryland, U.S.
- Party: Democratic
- Spouse: Hilda Katz (m. 1925)
- Children: 3
- Education: Lehigh University (attended)
- Occupation: Business executive, diplomat, philanthropist
- Known for: Founding American Oil Company, U.S. delegate to the United Nations

Jacob Blaustein (September 30, 1892 – November 15, 1970) was an American entrepreneur, philanthropist, and diplomat who founded the American Oil Company with his father Louis Blaustein. Blaustein was an ardent supporter of human rights, the rights of Jewish people, and an advocate for multilateralism through the United Nations, serving as a United States delegate to the UN under five U.S. presidents.

== Early life ==
Jacob Blaustein was born on September 30, 1892, in Baltimore, Maryland, the son of Louis and Henrietta Blaustein.

As a child, he helped his father deliver kerosene on a 270-gallon horse-drawn tank wagon. During childhood, he attended religious school at Baltimore's Temple Oheb Shalom.

Blaustein attended Baltimore Polytechnic Institute and took mechanical drawing classes at the Maryland Institute College of Art. He briefly attended Lehigh University to study chemistry but left school to help his father in business.

== Business career ==
=== Oil industry ===
In 1910 when he was 18 years old, Blaustein and his father started the American Oil Company (AMOCO) in Baltimore, which was formally incorporated in 1922. At the time of incorporation, Blaustein held a 25% equity stake in the company to his father's 75%. One of their first employees was Joseph Harry Biden (1893–1941), paternal grandfather of President Joe Biden.

In 1924, the Pan American Petroleum and Transport Company purchased a 50% interest in the company for $5 million in exchange for a guaranteed supply of oil. In 1925, Standard Oil of Indiana acquired Pan American, beginning John D. Rockefeller's association with the AMOCO name.

In 1927, AMOCO gas fueled Charles Lindbergh's transatlantic flight which was the first non-stop flight from New York to Paris. Under Jacob and his father's leadership, AMOCO pioneered the concepts of the drive-in gas station, the first metered gasoline pump, and the original anti-knock gasoline which allowed the development of the high-compression engine.

Blaustein remained in his leadership role as president and board chairman of AMOCO until his death in 1970, when he was succeeded in the role by his son Dr. Morton Blaustein.

=== Other business interests ===
In 1931, Blaustein established the American Trading And Production Corporation (ATAPCO) which was formed to consolidate and diversify the family's business activities and investments. These additional building holdings included manufacturing companies, tankers and oil wells, real estate holdings, Crown Central Petroleum, and the controlling shares of the Union Trust Company of Baltimore. By the 1950s, Blaustein was included on the Fortune and Forbes Lists of Wealthiest Americans.

Blaustein played a central role in the revitalization of downtown Baltimore through the development of the Blaustein Building in the 1960s.

== Public service ==
=== World War II ===
During World War II, Blaustein was president and chairman of the Overseas News Agency and Jewish Telegraphic Agency which reported on antisemitic and other minority crimes taking place around the world. During the war, Blaustein was also the acting chairman of the marketing committee of the U.S. Petroleum Administration for War, and a member of its committees on supplies, distribution, and joint use of facilities. Blaustein was a key member of the National Petroleum Council which served as a trusted advisor to the federal government on petroleum and gas matters of international significance during the war.

Blaustein traveled on a post-war mission to Germany in 1946 at the invitation of Commanding General of the United States Forces in the European Theater Joseph T. McNarney, he made a survey of Displaced Persons Camps.

=== Holocaust reparations ===
After World War II, Blaustein advocated for reparations for the surviving victims of the Holocaust and helped to negotiate a $10 billion victim reparation plan with the Government of West Germany and Chancellor Konrad Adenauer. Blaustein led the American Jewish Committee's (AJC) Delegation to the Paris Peace Conference where he advocated for the strengthening of human rights clauses in the treaties and the inclusion of guarantees to aid victims of persecution through reparations.

Blaustein served as Senior Vice President of the Conference on Jewish Material Claims against Germany which was opened in New York City in order to help with individual claims. The organization functioned for a period of 15 years from 1951 to 1966. Through negotiations, a total sum of $845 million direct and indirect compensations was disbursed. In 1956, Blaustein testified regarding the organization's progress to the United States Senate Committee on Appropriations.

In 1960, Blaustein negotiated with the manufacturers of Krupp armaments to award compensatory damages for each slave laborer employed in their factories during the war.

=== United Nations ===
Blaustein was an influential leader within the United Nations from its inception through the rest of his life. In March 1945, just one month before his death, President Franklin D. Roosevelt met with Blaustein and appointed him to represent the United States as a consultant delegate at the founding meetings and San Francisco Conference of the United Nations in San Francisco. While he was at the San Francisco Conference, Blaustein helped to convince Soviet Foreign Minister Vyacheslav Molotov to accept the human rights articles of the UN Charter.

Blaustein was an active advocate for the civil and religious rights of Jewish Americans and promoted tolerance among religious groups. Blaustein participated in a number of peacekeeping missions and negotiations on behalf of the United States government. Blaustein was an astute and trusted dealmaker and undertook diplomatic missions to Germany, Israel, North Africa, Morocco, Turkey, Greece, Poland, and South America on behalf of the United States.

In 1955, President Dwight D. Eisenhower appointed Blaustein as a regular member of the United States delegation to the United Nations. During this period, Blaustein became close friends with Secretary-General of the United Nations Dag Hammarskjöld, and he accompanied him on a number of diplomatic missions. Blaustein served as a conduit between Hammarskjöld and Israel during Egypt's blockade of Israeli passage through the Suez Canal in the 1950s. After Hammarskjöld's death from a plane crash in 1961, Blaustein commissioned the sculpture Single Form to be installed at the UN Headquarters in his honor. Blaustein was an active early board member of the United Nations Association of the United States of America and worked closely with Eleanor Roosevelt, earning her praise in a 1958 My Day column.

Blaustein long advocated for the creation of the position of UN High Commissioner for Human Rights, a role that was created by the United Nations in 1993, over 23 years after his death and 30 years after he publicly called for the position in a December 1963 speech.

=== Israel-U.S. relations ===
Blaustein was active in the creation of the nation of Israel, the 1947 partition of Palestine through the United Nations, and for American recognition of the new state. He served as president of the American Jewish Committee (AJC) from 1949 to 1954.

During his time as leader of the AJC, the organization took the position that fighting prejudice towards Jews in the United States could best be achieved by working to advance equality of all Americans. Blaustein commissioned social science research into the causes of and solutions to address prejudice in the United States, and forged alliances with other associations including the United Negro College Fund, National Association for the Advancement of Colored People, Catholic Association for International Peace, and the General Federation of Women's Clubs.

The AJC's social science research was cited in the 1954 Brown v. Board of Education decision of the U.S. Supreme Court that outlawed school segregation.

Blaustein and Israeli Prime Minister David Ben-Gurion negotiated an understanding to govern the relaetions between Israel and the American Jewish community. They agreed that American Jews would lobby and raise money for Israel without meddling in Israeli politics and policies, while Israel would recognize the allegiance of American Jews to the United States and would not meddle in the internal affairs of diaspora communities. While individuals who wished to immigrate to Israel would be welcomed, those remaining in the United States would not be disparaged as "exiles", and American and Israeli Jews would not speak on behalf of each other. Abba Eban wrote that Blaustein was considered a "foremost interpreter of the concept of American-Israel friendship."

Blaustein played an influential role in Israel's admission to the United Nations, U.S. Export-Import Bank loans to Israel, and economic grants-in-aid for Israel from the United States. After completing his term as AJC president, Blaustein was appointed as an honorary president from 1954 until his death in 1970.

=== Federal service ===
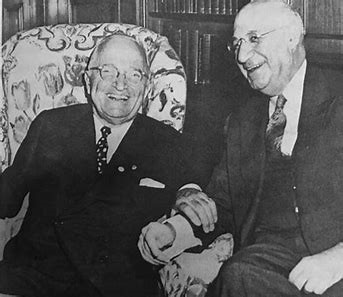
Blaustein with President Truman, c. 1950s

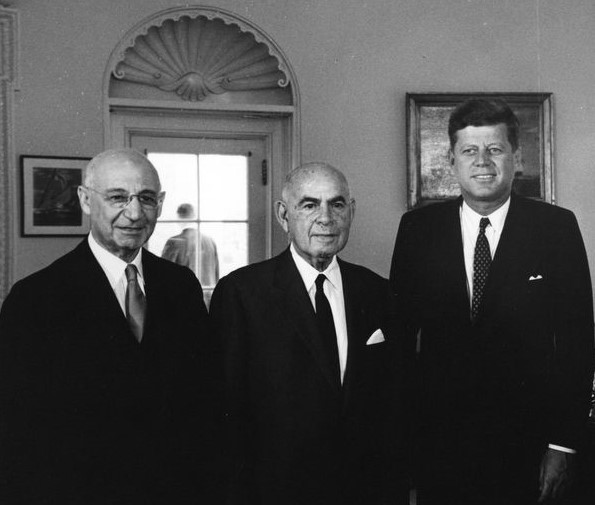
Blaustein meeting with President Kennedy and former senator Herbert Lehman in the Oval Office, c. 1962

Blaustein served as an informal and trusted advisor to a number of US presidents, including Franklin D. Roosevelt, Harry Truman, John F. Kennedy, and Lyndon B. Johnson. Blaustein also brief representatives in the United States Department of State after his foreign trips, and developed a close working relationship with United States Ambassador to the United Nations Henry Cabot Lodge Jr.

President Truman appointed Blaustein to serve on his National Advisory Board on Mobilization Policy during the Korean War, which met in the Cabinet Room of the White House. President Truman became a close personal friend of Blaustein, often asking him to report directly to him after his foreign trips and advise him on international and domestic issues. In the fall of 1945, President Truman made a personal visit to the Blaustein's Baltimore farm and estate, Alto Dale.

In 1948, when President Truman was debating whether to seek election as president, he called in six people to advise him, with Mr. Blaustein among the selected advisors. Blaustein's long association with Truman continued when he served as a trustee of the Harry S. Truman Presidential Library and Museum.

During the presidency of Dwight D. Eisenhower, Blaustein served as a member of the United States delegation to the UN. He continued in the role during the Kennedy Administration and Johnson Administration.

President Kennedy appointed Blaustein to the board of governors of United Service Organizations and to the Federal Advisory Committee on International Business, met with him on multiple occasions to seek his advice on foreign and domestic policy matters, Middle East refugee crises, and invited him to multiple state dinners.

Blaustein was a representative to the July 1963 White House Conference on Community Development.

After the Assassination of John F. Kennedy in November 1963, Blaustein was re-appointed to his federal posts by the new president Lyndon B. Johnson. Johnson also appointed Blaustein to serve as a member of the President's Commission on Marine Science, Engineering and Resources, and as a trustee of the Eleanor Roosevelt Memorial Foundation in 1964.

Blaustein and his wife dined with President Richard Nixon at the White House in September 1969.

== Personal life ==
In 1925, Blaustein married Hilda Katz. They had three children, Morton, Barbara, and Elizabeth.

Blaustein enjoyed listening to classical music and was a noted collector of a variety of paintings by Vincent van Gogh, Paul Gauguin, André Derain, Camille Pissarro, and Maurice Utrillo. He enjoyed gardening and raising orchids and was described in Forbes as "slender and soft spoken."

Blaustein was an active member and donor to the Democratic Party but maintained close working relationships with U.S. leaders from both parties.

Blaustein served as a board member of a number of organizations including the Dag Hammarskjöld Foundation, Hebrew University of Jerusalem, Weizmann Institute of Science, Atlantic Council, the Signet Banking Corporation, and the Associated Jewish Charities and Welfare Fund.

== Philanthropy ==
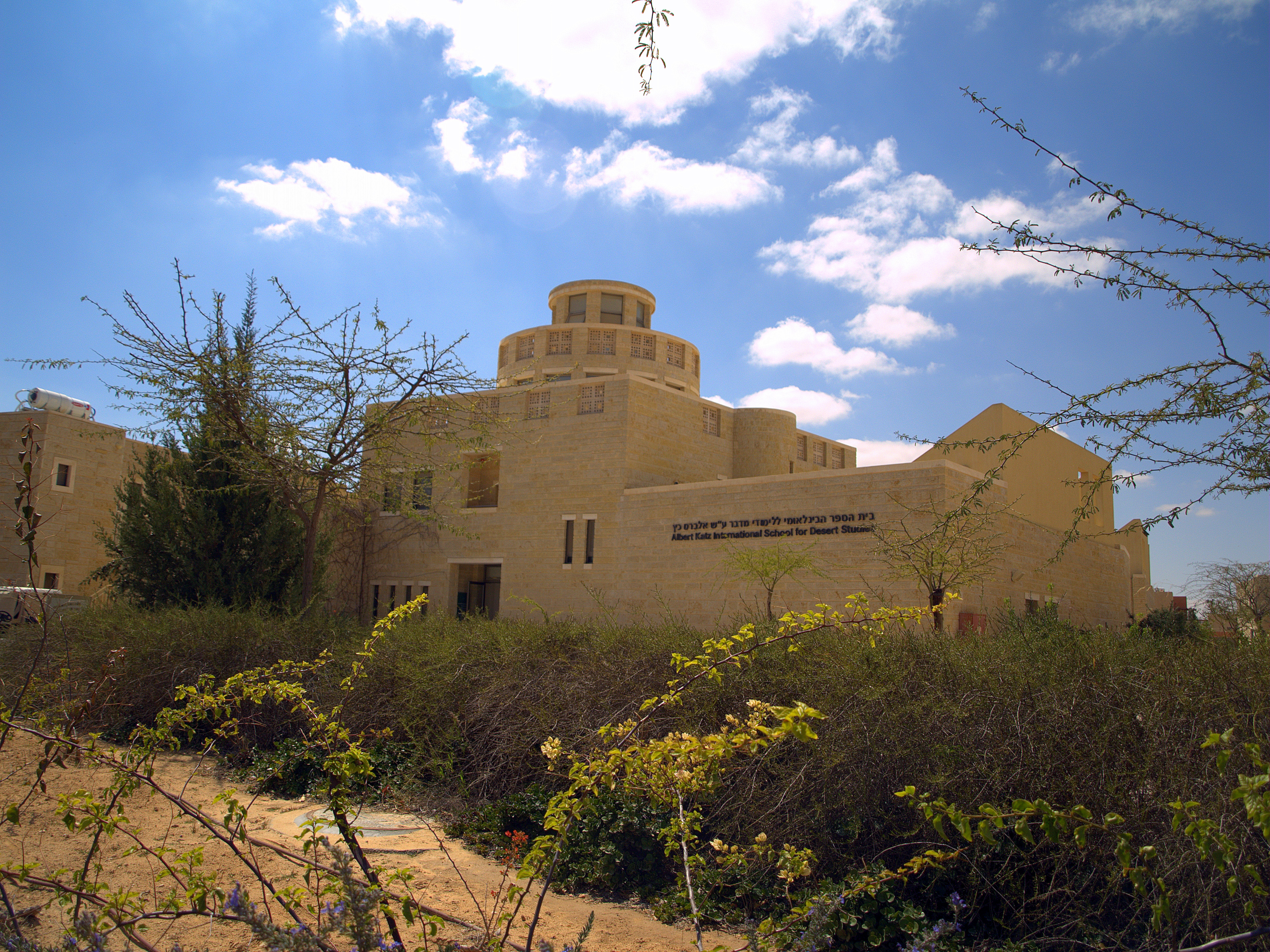
Campus at Jacob Blaustein Institutes for Desert Research, Midreshet Ben-Gurion, Israel

In 1957, the Jacob & Hilda Blaustein Family Foundation was established to disburse much of Blaustein's wealth through a variety of charitable, educational, and civic causes, in addition to supporting Israeli democracy, international human rights initiatives, and American Jewish education. The foundation serves as a benefactor of the Jacob Blaustein Institutes for Desert Research and Center for Scientific Cooperation at the Ben-Gurion University of the Negev in Israel.

In the Baltimore area, the foundation has supported programs within Baltimore City Public Schools, the Baltimore Symphony Orchestra, and the Wilmer Ophthalmological Institute at Johns Hopkins University School of Medicine.

== Death ==
Blaustein died on November 15, 1970, at the age of 78 at his home in Baltimore, Maryland.

== Honors and legacy ==
Blaustein was a recipient of numerous awards and honors, both during his life and posthumously. In 1951, Blaustein received the Richard Gottheil Medal from the Zeta Beta Tau fraternity and was a Knight of Malta. Blaustein was awarded an honorary Doctor of Humane Letters from Lehigh University in 1956 and received additional honorary degrees from Wilberforce University and Morgan State College.

On September 15, 1968, Blaustein was on the cover of Forbes Magazine with a featured article about him. Blaustein was a recipient of honors and awards from the Albert Einstein College of Medicine, University of Maryland, Hebrew University of Jerusalem, and New York Board of Rabbis.

In 1971, the American Jewish Committee established the Jacob Blaustein Institute for the Advancement of Human Rights which works to fight religious intolerance, end discrimination, and advocate for the rights of the Jewish community and other marginalized groups around the world.

In 1999, Blaustein was named a "Marylander of the Century" by the Baltimore Sun.

In a 2015 speech commemorating the 70th anniversary of the UN Charter, Speaker of the U.S. House of Representatives Nancy Pelosi delivered remarks where she recalled meeting then-Senator John F. Kennedy at a dinner honoring Blaustein in the 1950s.

Artworks owned by Blaustein are now on display in the permanent collections of the Smithsonian Institution, Walters Art Museum, and Baltimore Museum of Art.
