= Arkansas Highway 396 =

State highway in Arkansas, United States

Highway 396

Route information
- Maintained by ArDOT
- Length: 2.6 mi (4.2 km)
- Existed: April 25, 1973–November 30, 2016

Major junctions
- West end: Ursey Road
- East end: US 65 near Burlington

Location
- Country: United States
- State: Arkansas
- Counties: Boone

Highway system
- Arkansas Highway System; Interstate; US; State; Business; Spurs; Suffixed; Scenic; Heritage
← AR 395	→ AR 397

Highway 396 (AR 396 or Hwy. 396) is a former state highway near Burlington in Boone County. Between its designation as a state highway in 1973 and its decommissioning to the county road system in 2016, it was maintained by the Arkansas Department of Transportation (ArDOT).

== Route description ==
The ArDOT maintained Highway 396 like all other parts of the state highway system. As a part of these responsibilities, the Department tracks the volume of traffic using its roads in surveys using a metric called average annual daily traffic (AADT). ArDOT estimates the traffic level for a segment of roadway for any average day of the year in these surveys. AADT was estimated at 180 vehicles per day at the eastern terminus in 2016. For reference, roads under 400 VPD are classified as very low volume local road by the American Association of State Highway and Transportation Officials (AASHTO).

No segment of Highway 396 was part of the National Highway System (NHS), a network of roads important to the nation's economy, defense, and mobility.

Highway 396 ran in the Ozark Mountains, beginning at a junction with US Highway 65 (US 65) north of Burlington, an unincorporated community in northern Boone County 7 miles (11 km) south of the Missouri state line. Highway 396 ran west from this junction 2.6 miles (4.2 km) through a rural area of undulating hills to an intersection with Flint Hill School Road, where state maintenance ended. The roadway continued west under county maintenance as Ursey Road.

== History ==
In 1973, the Arkansas General Assembly passed Act 9 of 1973. The act directed county judges and legislators to designate up to 12 miles (19 km) of county roads as state highways in each county. Pursuant to the act, the Arkansas State Highway Commission designated a county road in Boone County as Highway 396 on April 25, 1973.

The highway was returned to local maintenance in November 2016. The Highway Commission utilized a policy that allows returning state highways to local control to offset the costs of non-reimbursable utility relocation where small water utilities do not have the necessary funds to relocate their lines along important highway projects. Boone County assumed maintenance of Highway 396 following verification that the Valley Springs Water Association and the Western Grove Water Association would not be able to afford relocation of their water mains along US 65, which was widened under the Connecting Arkansas Program.

== Major intersections ==
The entire route is in Boone County.

Location	mi	km	Destinations	Notes
	0.0	0.0	US 65	Eastern terminus (Note: Although Arkansas highways normally run from south to north and from west to east, the order creating this highway says "beginning at the junction of U. S. 65 north of Burlington, thence running westerly")
	2.6	4.2	End state maintenance, roadway continues as Ursey Road	Western terminus
1.000 mi = 1.609 km; 1.000 km = 0.621 mi
