= Missouri Route 249 =

State highway in Missouri, U.S.

Route 249

Route information
- Maintained by MoDOT
- Length: 6.162 mi (9.917 km)
- Existed: 2002–present

Major junctions
- South end: I-44 / I-49 / US 71 in Joplin
- I-44 BL / Route 66 in Duenweg
- North end: I-49 BL / Route 171 in Carterville

Location
- Country: United States
- State: Missouri
- Counties: Jasper

Highway system
- Missouri State Highway System; Interstate; US; State; Supplemental
← Route 248	→ Route 254

Route 249 is a 6.16-mile-long (9.91 km) freeway in the southwestern part of the U.S. state of Missouri. It runs from I-44/I-49 in Joplin north to I-49 BL/Route 171 in Carterville.

== Route description ==
Route 249 begins at an interchange with I-44, I-49, and US 71 east of Joplin in Jasper County, where the road continues south as I-49/US 71. The route heads north as a four-lane freeway through agricultural areas with some nearby development, coming to an interchange with Route 66/I-44 Bus. west of Duenweg. The freeway continues north to the next interchange at Newman Road. Route 249 curves northwest and comes to the exit for Route VV (Zora Street). The route curves north and ends at an interchange with I-49 Bus./Route 171 near Carterville.

== History ==
After an agreement between EPA and the state of Missouri, the Missouri Highway and Transportation Department built the Route 249 highway bypass through four miles (6.4 km) of contaminated land on the site in 2001. The project adaptively reused mine wastes as fill material. Cleanup of the Superfund site began in 2007, and the Route 249 bypass opened to the public in 2008.

== Exit list ==
The entire route is in Jasper County. All exits are unnumbered.

Location	mi	km	Destinations	Notes
Joplin	0.000	0.000	I-49 south / US 71 south – Neosho, Fort Smith	Southern terminus; exit 39B on I-49
Joplin	0.329– 0.348	0.529– 0.560	I-44 / I-49 north / US 71 north – Springfield, Kansas City, Tulsa	Southbound exit and northbound entrance; exit 11B on I-44
Duenweg	1.845	2.969	I-44 BL / Route 66 (7th Street)	
	2.836	4.564	Newman Road	
Joplin	3.937	6.336	Route VV (Zora Street)	
Carterville	6.162	9.917	I-49 BL / Route 171 to I-49 (US 71) – Webb City, Carthage, Kansas City	Northern terminus
1.000 mi = 1.609 km; 1.000 km = 0.621 mi: Incomplete access
