= Eugene, Missouri =

Unincorporated community in Missouri, U.S.

- Unincorporated community
- Location within the state of Missouri
- Coordinates: 38°21′17″N 92°24′11″W
- Country: United States
- State: Missouri
- County: Cole

Area
  - Total: 0.34 sq mi (0.87 km^{2})
  - Land: 0.34 sq mi (0.87 km^{2})
  - Water: 0 sq mi (0.00 km^{2})
- Elevation: 827 ft (252 m)

Population (2020)
  - Total: 140
  - Density: 419/sq mi (161.6/km^{2})
- Time zone: UTC-6 (Central (CST))
  - Summer (DST): UTC-5 (CDT)
- Zip Code: 65032
- Area code: 573
- FIPS code: 29-22798
- GNIS feature ID: 2790921

Eugene is an unincorporated community in extreme southwestern Cole County, Missouri, United States. As of the 2020 census, the population is 140. It is located 10 miles (16 km) east of Eldon on Route 17, approximately 3 miles (5 km) south of U.S. Route 54.

Eugene was founded in 1904, and named after Eugene Simpson, the original owner of the town site. A post office called Eugene has been in operation since 1904.

== Demographics ==
Historical population
Census	Pop.	Note	%±
2020	140		—
U.S. Decennial Census

== Education ==
It is in the Cole County R-V School District. Cole County R-V School District's facility is located in Eugene and has a K-12 enrollment of approximately 620 students.
