= Lanton, Missouri =

Unincorporated community in Missouri, U.S.

Coordinates: 36°31′02″N 91°48′06″W

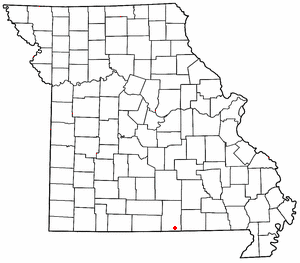

Lanton is an Unincorporated community in southern Howell County, Missouri, United States. It is located on Missouri Route 17 between Missouri Route 142 and the Arkansas line approximately one mile to the south.

A post office called Lanton was established in 1881, and remained in operation until 1977. The community's name is an amalgamation of Lancaster and Sutton, the surnames of two early settlers.

The Lanton Fire Department boasts the lowest ISO rating in the region of most rural fire departments, and operates out of two stations, one in Lanton proper, the other halfway to West Plains.
