= Missouri Route 66 =

State highway in Missouri, U.S.

Route 66
- Route 66 highlighted in red

Route information
- Maintained by MoDOT
- Length: 14.239 mi (22.915 km)
- Existed: 1985–present

Major junctions
- West end: K-66 at the Kansas state line near Galena, KS
- I-44 BL / I-49 BL / Route 43 in Joplin; Route 249 east of Duquesne
- East end: I-44 / I-44 BL / I-49 / US 71 east of Duenweg

Location
- Country: United States
- State: Missouri
- County: Jasper

Highway system
- Missouri State Highway System; Interstate; US; State; Supplemental
← US 66	→ US 67

Route 66 is a fourteen-mile long road in Jasper County, Missouri.

== Route description ==
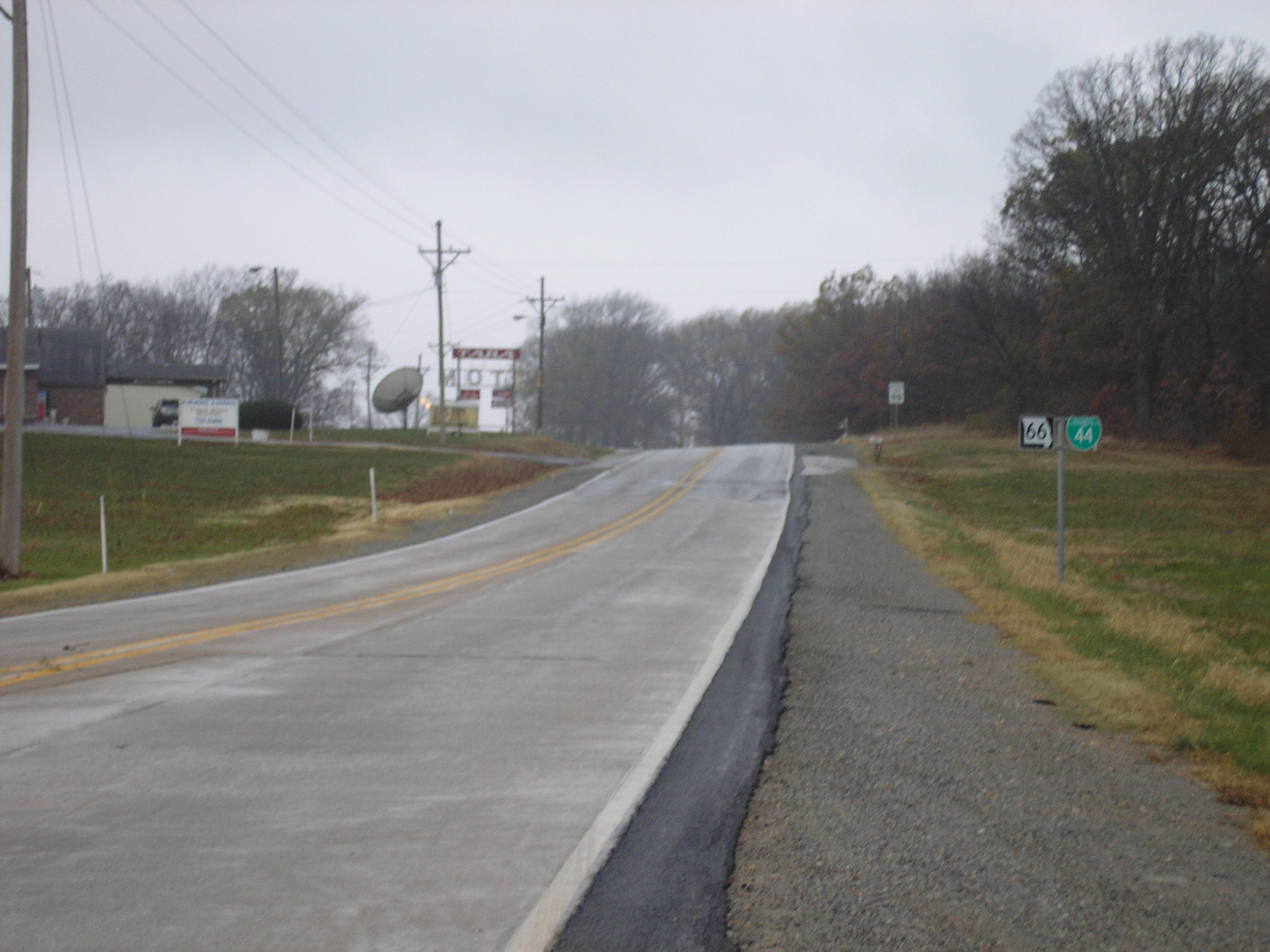
Route 66 concurrent with Interstate 44 Business at their eastern terminus near Duenweg

Route 66 begins at the Kansas state line in Jasper County, where it continues west into that state as K-66. From the state line, the route heads northeast on West 7th Street, a four-lane divided highway also marked as "Historic Route 66". The road intersects Old Route 66, at which point it curves to the east. Route 66 passes through wooded areas with some development, passing through Central City. Farther east, the median becomes a center left-turn lane as the highway passes businesses. The route crosses into Joplin and intersects the southern terminus of Route P. Route 66 continues as a four-lane undivided road through commercial areas, running to the north of a Missouri and Northern Arkansas Railroad line for a time. The road passes a mix of homes and businesses before it heads into downtown Joplin and intersects I-44 Bus./Route 43.

At this point, I-44 Bus. turns east to form a concurrency with Route 66. The two routes continue east on East 7th Street, passing through more of the downtown before coming to a bridge over the Missouri and Northern Arkansas Railroad and Kansas City Southern's Heavener Subdivision. The road gains a center left-turn lane and passes through residential and commercial areas, crossing the Missouri and Northern Arkansas Railroad. I-44 Bus./Route 66 head into an area of businesses and become a divided highway as they cross I-49 Bus. The roadway continues into Duquesne where it passes homes along with some commercial establishments as a five-lane road with a center left-turn lane. The routes leave Duquesne and pass through a mix of rural areas and development. I-44 Bus./Route 66 reach an interchange with the Route 249 freeway. Past this interchange, the road continues into Duenweg, where it narrows to two lanes and passes homes and businesses in the northern part of town. East of Duenweg, the two routes pass through a mix of fields and woods, intersecting the southern terminus of Route AA. I-44 Bus./Route 66 pass through Scotland before merging into eastbound I-44/northbound I-49/US 71 at a partial interchange.

== History ==
Although all of Route 66 once served as US 66, only five of the six westernmost miles are marked as "Historic Route 66" being that the historic alignment comes in from the north (westbound) on Main Street in Joplin. The very westernmost mile of Historic Route 66 turns off Route 66 on a county road known as "Route 66 Boulevard"and enters Kansas at a different location than the current state highway.

== Major intersections ==
The entire route is in Jasper County.

Location	mi	km	Destinations	Notes
Central City	0.000	0.000	K-66 west (7th Street) – Galena	Continuation into Kansas
Joplin	3.958	6.370	Route P north (Schifferdecker Avenue)	
Joplin	5.925	9.535	I-44 BL west / Route 43 (Main Street)	Western end of I-44 Bus. concurrency
Joplin	7.928	12.759	I-49 BL (Range Line Road)	
Duenweg	10.802– 10.818	17.384– 17.410	Route 249 – Carterville	Interchange
Duenweg	12.718	20.468	Route AA north (CR 180)	
Scotland	14.239	22.915	I-44 BL ends / I-44 east / I-49 / US 71 north – Springfield, Kansas City	Eastern terminus; eastern end of I-44 Bus. concurrency; I-44 exit 15
1.000 mi = 1.609 km; 1.000 km = 0.621 mi: Concurrency terminus

== See also ==
- U.S. Route 66 in Missouri
