= Missouri Route 88 =

Former state highway in Missouri, U.S.

Route 88
- Route 88 highlighted in gray

Route information
- Length: 6.847 mi (11.019 km)
- Existed: c. 1960s–c. 1978–79

Major junctions
- West end: US 60 / US 160 in Springfield
- East end: I-44 BL / US 65 Bus. in Springfield

Location
- Country: United States
- State: Missouri
- Counties: Greene

Highway system
- Missouri State Highway System; Interstate; US; State; Supplemental
← Route 87	→ Route 89

Route 88 was a 6.8-mile-long (10.9 km) state highway located entirely within the city limits of Springfield. Its western terminus was at Sunshine Street (formerly US 60/US 160, now designated as Route 413). Its eastern terminus was at Glenstone Avenue (Business Loop 44 and also formerly designated as US 65 Business). It was a collection of older highways (mainly business routes) which were still under state maintenance.

== Route description ==
From the intersection of Sunshine Street and Scenic Avenue, it went north on Scenic to Scenic's northern terminus at Chestnut Expressway, east on Chestnut Expressway, then north on Kansas Expressway, then briefly east on Division Street and then followed Commercial Street to Glenstone.

== Major intersections ==
The entire route is in Springfield, Greene County.

mi	km	Destinations	Notes
0.000	0.000	US 60 / US 160 (Sunshine Street)	
2.066	3.325	I-44 BL west / Route 13 south (Chestnut Expressway)	Southern end of Loop 44 overlap; southern end of Route 13 overlap
3.154	5.076	I-44 BL east (Chestnut Expressway)	Northern end of Loop 44 overlap
3.985	6.413	Route 13 north (Kansas Expressway)	Northern end of Route 13 overlap
6.847	11.019	I-44 BL / US 65 Bus. (Glenstone Avenue)	
1.000 mi = 1.609 km; 1.000 km = 0.621 mi: Concurrency terminus
