= Louis Blaustein =

American businessman and philanthropist

- Born: January 16, 1869; Lithuania
- Died: 1937 (aged 67–68)
- Occupation: businessman
- Known for: Founder of American Oil Company (AMOCO)
- Children: 5, including Jacob Blaustein

Louis Blaustein (January 16, 1869 in Pikeliai, Lithuania – July 27, 1937 in Atlantic City, New Jersey) was an American businessman and philanthropist who founded the American Oil Company (AMOCO).

== Biography ==
Blaustein was born in Lithuania (then part of the Russian Empire) to a Lithuanian Jewish family, and immigrated to the United States in 1883 at the age of fourteen. He worked as a peddler in Pennsylvania before moving to Baltimore, where he and his son Jacob delivered kerosene on a horse-drawn wagon. He then took a job with the Standard Oil Company where he eventually saved enough capital to found his own oil company with his son Jacob in 1910, the American Oil Company (AMOCO), and incorporated it in 1922. In 1924, the Pan American Petroleum and Transport Company purchased a 50% interest in the company for $5 million in exchange for a guaranteed supply of oil. Before this deal, AMOCO was forced to depend on Standard Oil of New Jersey, a competitor, for its supplies. In 1925, Standard Oil of Indiana acquired Pan American, beginning John D. Rockefeller's association with the AMOCO name.

AMOCO pioneered the concepts of the drive-in gas station, the first metered gasoline pump (which showed the quantity and total price of fuel received), and the original anti-knock gasoline which allowed the development of the high-compression engine. AMOCO would expand vertically, owning refineries, steamship terminals and truck fleets in addition to its vast network of service stations.

== Philanthropy ==
Blaustein was a prominent philanthropist, donating most of his money anonymously. The Louis & Henrietta Blaustein Family Foundation was dissolved in 2001 and replaced by the Jacob & Hilda Blaustein Family Foundation, the Alvin & Fanny B. Thalheimer Foundation, and the Henry & Ruth Blaustein Rosenberg Family Foundation.

== Personal life ==
He was married to Henrietta Gittelsohn (1871–1965) with whom he had five children, of which three survived to adulthood: Jacob Blaustein (1892–1970), Fanny Blaustein Thalheimer (1895–1957) and Ruth Blaustein Rosenberg (1899–1992). The Blaustein family continues on in three businesses: American Trading and Production Corporation (ATAPCO), Lord Baltimore Capital Corporation, and Rosemore, Inc.
