= Carlin's Amoco Station =

- U.S. National Register of Historic Places
- Virginia Landmarks Register
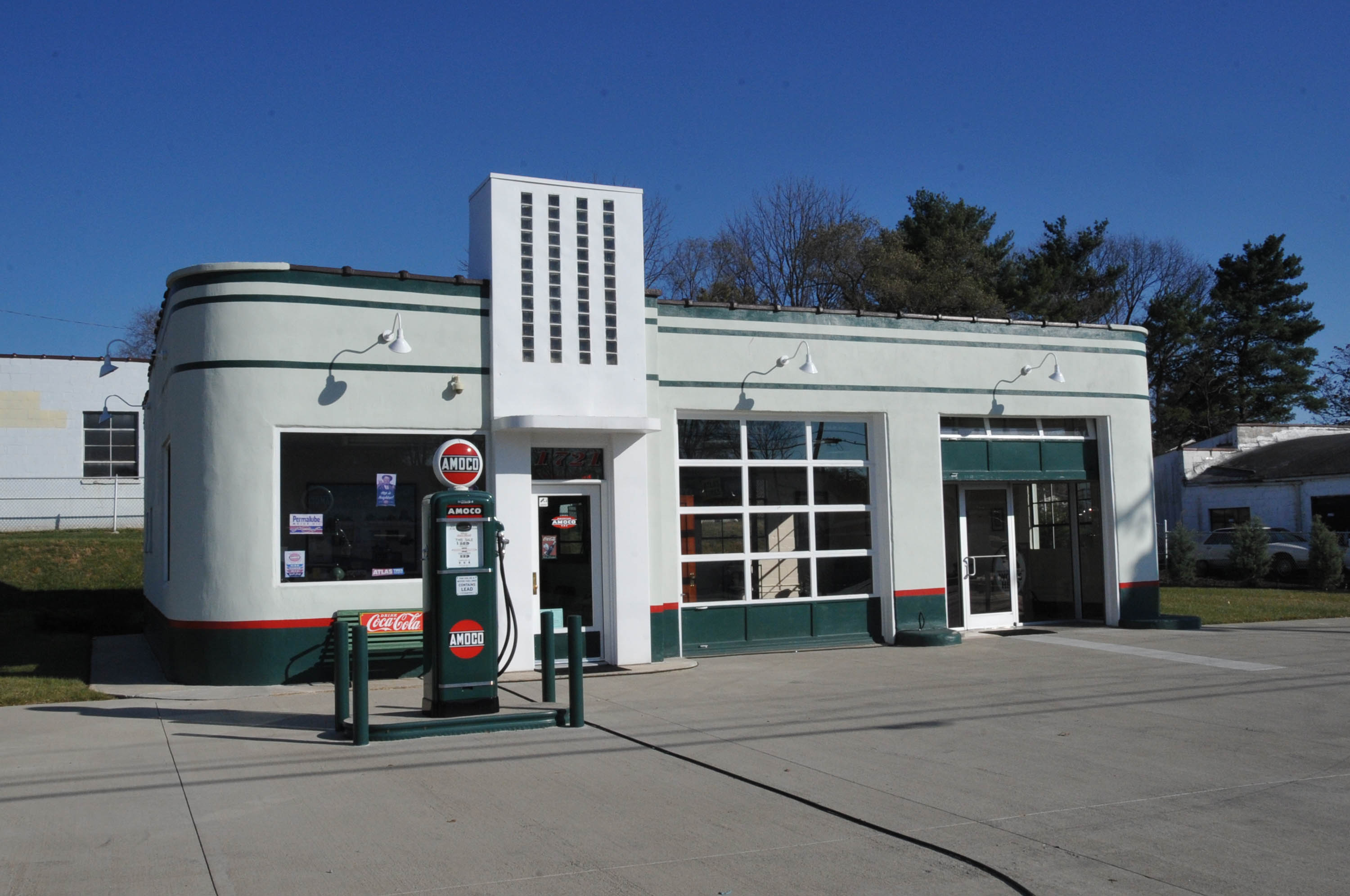

- Location within Virginia Location within the United States
- Location: 1721 Williamson Rd. NE, Roanoke, Virginia
- Coordinates: 37°17′17″N 79°56′01″W
- Area: 0.6 acres (0.24 ha)
- Built: 1947, 1953
- Architect: Terp, George W.
- Architectural style: Streamline Moderne
- NRHP reference No.: 12000968
- VLR No.: 128-6389

Significant dates
- Added to NRHP: November 20, 2012
- Designated VLR: September 20, 2012

Carlin's Amoco Station is a historic Amoco service station located at Roanoke, Virginia. It was built about 1947, and remodeled about 1953 in the Streamline Moderne style. The one-story gas station is constructed of concrete block covered with stucco and sits on a concrete slab foundation. Also on the property is an associated repair shop constructed about 1947.

Built on Williamson Road in Roanoke, the gas station was a scene of viewing muscle car drag racing and cruising by local teenagers in the post-war years between 1947 and 1962.

The building was listed on the National Register of Historic Places in 2012.
