= Interstate 44 in Missouri =

Highway in Missouri

Interstate 44
- I-44 highlighted in red

Route information
- Maintained by MoDOT
- Length: 293.183 mi (471.832 km)
- Existed: 1956–present
- NHS: Entire route

Major junctions
- West end: I-44 Toll / Will Rogers Turnpike at the Oklahoma state line in Joplin
- US 166 / US 400 in Joplin; I-49 / US 71 / Route 249 in Joplin; US 65 / US 160 / Route 13 in Springfield; Route 5 / Route 32 / Route 64 in Lebanon; Route 7 north of Laquey; US 63 in Rolla; US 50 near Union; I-270 in Sunset Hills; US 50 / US 61 / US 67 in Kirkwood; I-55 / I-64 / US 40 in St. Louis
- East end: I-70 in St. Louis

Location
- Country: United States
- State: Missouri
- Counties: Newton, Jasper, Lawrence, Greene, Webster, Laclede, Pulaski, Phelps, Crawford, Franklin, St. Louis, City of St. Louis

Highway system
- Interstate Highway System; Main; Auxiliary; Suffixed; Business; Future; Missouri State Highway System; Interstate; US; State; Supplemental
← Route 43	→ I-44 BL

Interstate 44 (I-44) in the US state of Missouri runs northeast from the Oklahoma state line near Joplin to I-70 in Downtown St. Louis. It runs for about 293 miles (472 km) in the state, and is the longest Interstate Highway in the state.

== Route description ==
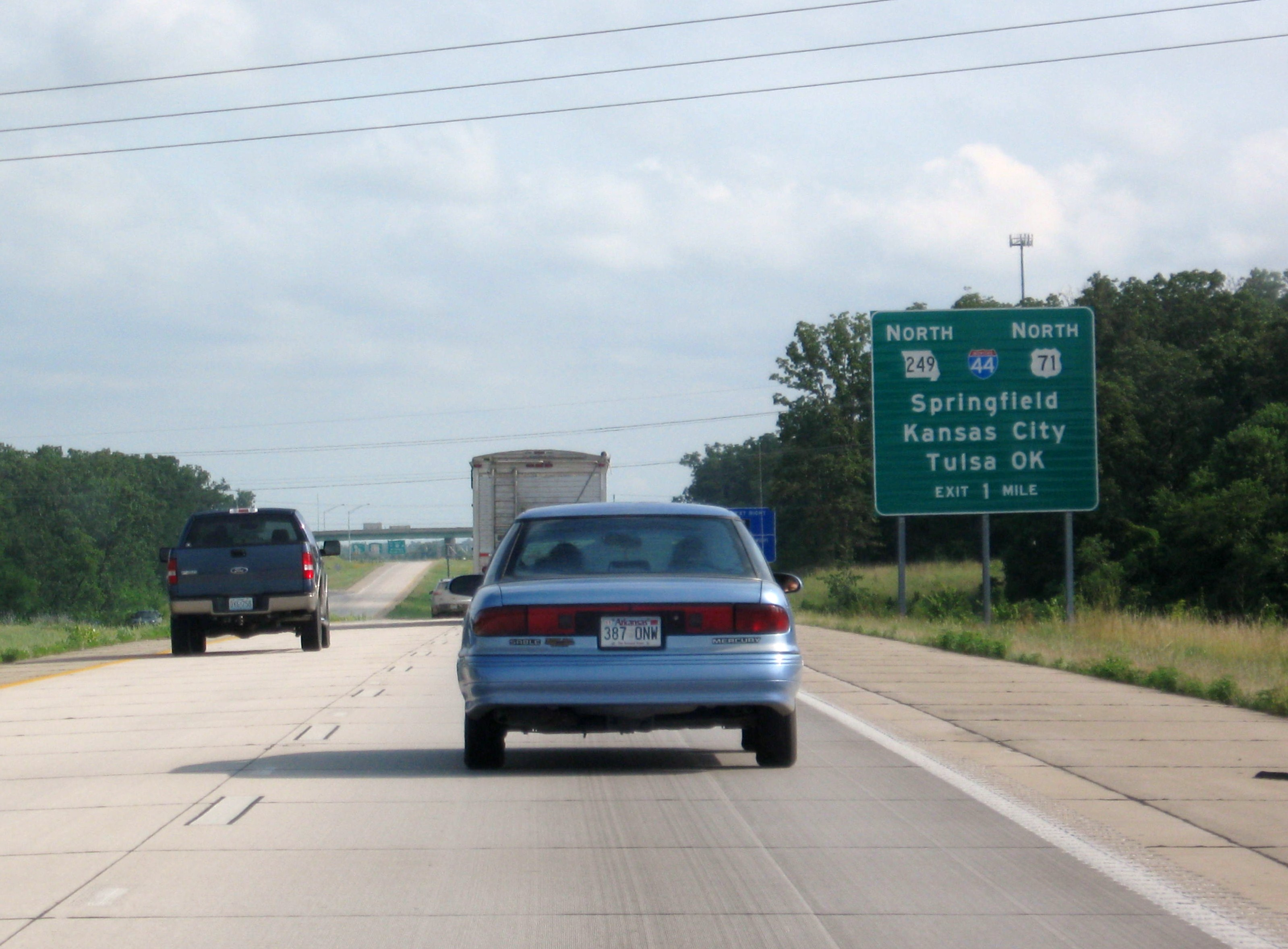
I-44 approached by US 71 (now part of I-49) just south of Joplin

I-44 enters Missouri in Newton County at the eastern terminus of the Will Rogers Turnpike, 200 yards (180 m) south of the Kansas state line. The first interchange in Missouri is the eastern terminus of both U.S. Route 166 (US 166) and US 400. This highway next goes through southern Joplin and then begins to run concurrently with I-49/US 71 at exit 11 just after entering Jasper County. The freeway turns to a more eastern heading (the old route of US 166), and then I-49/US 71 splits off to the north at exit 18.

I-44 next enters Lawrence County. Near Mount Vernon, the highway curves to the northeast. The section of highway to Halltown is a completely new highway, not supplanting any previous highways. At Halltown, the road curves back to due east, beginning to follow the general pathway of old US 66, which it does all the way to downtown St. Louis. I-44 then goes around the western and northern sides of Springfield, serving as the western terminus of the James River Freeway, as well as crossing both Route 13 and US 65. The Interstate Highway continues northeast, bypassing Lebanon.

In Pulaski County, I-44 enters the Mark Twain National Forest and then leaves it to provide access to Waynesville, St. Robert, and Fort Leonard Wood before reentering the national forest. The freeway leaves the forest in Phelps County west of Rolla. I-44 then goes through Rolla, where it meets US 63. It continues its northeastern course, passing near St. James, Cuba, Bourbon, Sullivan, and Saint Clair. At this point, it roughly parallels the Meramec River.

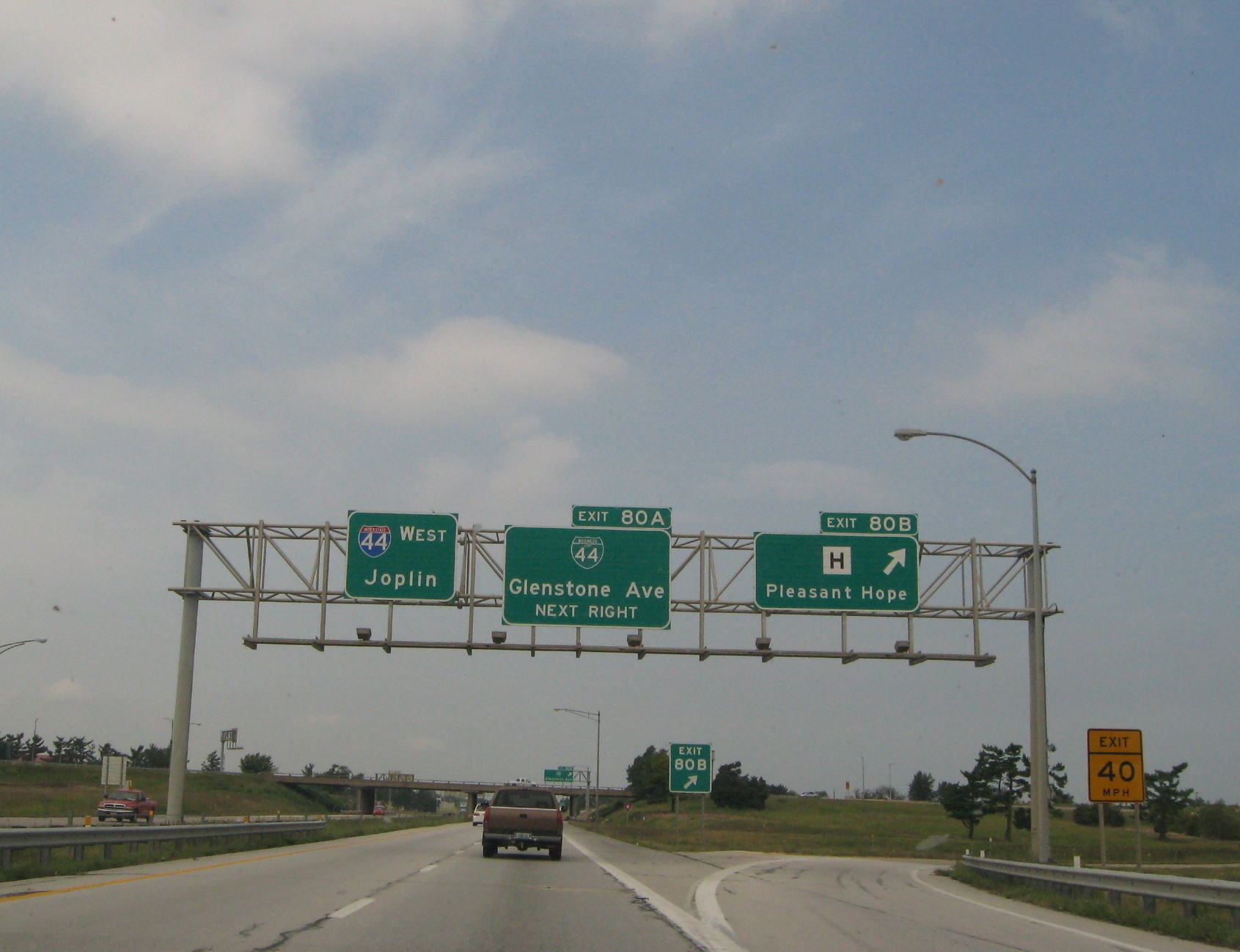
I-44 west in Springfield

I-44 next goes north of Pacific before moving into St. Louis County. I-44 then bisects Eureka before serving as the southern boundary of Route 66 State Park (the former site of Times Beach, known for its dioxin contamination and its eventual demolition and Superfund cleanup). I-44 then runs across unincorporated land before entering Fenton and meeting an interchange with I-270 in Sunset Hills. I-44 then goes through Crestwood, Kirkwood, Oakland, Webster Groves, and Shrewsbury before entering the city of St. Louis. I-44 runs on a due east course through St. Louis until it meets I-55 south of downtown. The two highways run concurrently for about two miles (3.2 km) until I-55 turns east at an interchange with I-64 to cross the Mississippi River on the Poplar Street Bridge. I-44 then continues north through Downtown St. Louis on the former route of I-70 to its junction with that highway at the Stan Musial Veterans Memorial Bridge; drivers wishing to access eastbound I-70 must cross the Poplar Street Bridge via I-55 and I-64.

== History ==
I-44 follows the general route of, and completely replaced, historic US 66 from Halltown (exit 58, the junction with a cutoff section of US 66 since renumbered as Route 96) to downtown St. Louis. From rural Joplin at exit 15 to Mount Vernon at exit 49, it largely follows a decommissioned section of US 166.

Originally, the eastern terminus of I-44 was at the I-55, I-64, I-70, and US 40 interchange by the Poplar Street Bridge. This was changed when the Stan Musial Veterans Memorial Bridge opened on February 9, 2014, rerouting I-70 over the river along a more northern alignment. I-44 now takes the old I-70 alignment through the below-grade section of roadway in St. Louis, extending the Interstate for about 1.5 miles (2.4 km) to its new eastern terminus at a directional interchange with I-70 near Cass Avenue; the eastbound lanes of I-44 join the westbound lanes of I-70, and the westbound lanes of I-44 branch off the eastbound lanes of I-70.

== Future ==
Missouri Department of Transportation (MoDot) has proposed to improve I-44 across Missouri such as an additional lane and some curve realignment. This study is known as Forward I-44.

== Exit list ==
County	Location	mi	km	Exit	Destinations	Notes
Newton	Joplin	0.000	0.000		I-44 Toll west (Will Rogers Turnpike) – Tulsa	Continuation into Oklahoma
Newton	Joplin	0.348	0.560	1	US 166 west / US 400 west (Downstream Boulevard) – Baxter Springs	Eastern terminus of US 166/US 400
Newton	Joplin	3.987	6.416	4	Route 43 south – Seneca	Western terminus of Route 43 concurrency
Newton	Joplin	6.618	10.651	6	I-44 BL east / Route 43 north / Route 86 east – Racine, Joplin	Eastern terminus of Route 43 concurrency; access to Shoal Creek Conservation Education Center, Freeman Hospital, and Mercy Hospital
Newton	Joplin	8.817	14.190	8	I-49 BL (Range Line Road)	Diverging diamond interchange; access to Missouri Southern State University
Jasper	Joplin	11.677– 11.880	18.792– 19.119	11	I-49 south / US 71 south / Route 249 north – Neosho, Fort Smith, Joplin	Signed as exits 11A (south) and 11B (north) eastbound; western terminus of I-49/US 71 concurrency
Jasper	Duenweg	13.190	21.227	13	Prigmor Road (CR 190) – Joplin	Opened November 2015
Jasper		15.483	24.917	15	I-44 BL west / Route 66 west – Duenweg	Westbound exit and eastbound entrance
Jasper	Fidelity	18.481	29.742	18	I-49 north / US 71 north / Route 59 south – Carthage, Kansas City, Diamond	Signed as exits 18A (south) and 18B (north); eastern terminus of I-49/US 71 concurrency; access to George Washington Carver National Monument and Neosho National Fish Hatchery
Jasper		22.497	36.205	22	CR 100	
Jasper		26.507	42.659	26	I-44 BL east / Route 37 – Sarcoxie, Reeds	
Jasper		29.929	48.166	29	I-44 BL west / Route U – Sarcoxie, La Russell	
Lawrence		33.517	53.940	33	To Route 97 south (CR 1010)	
Lawrence		38.498	61.957	38	Route 97 – Pierce City, Stotts City	
Lawrence		44.298	71.291	44	I-44 BL east / Route H – Mount Vernon, Monett	Access to the Missouri Veterans Home
Lawrence	Mount Vernon	46.930	75.527	46	I-44 BL west / Route 39 / Route 265 – Mount Vernon, Aurora	Access to Table Rock Lake
Lawrence		49.725	80.025	49	Route 174 – Chesapeake, Mount Vernon	
Lawrence		58.133	93.556	57	Route 96 west – Avilla	Westbound exit and eastbound entrance; former US 66 west
Lawrence		58.796	94.623	58	Route O / Route Z – Halltown	
Lawrence		61.964	99.721	61	Route K / Route PP	
Greene		67.011	107.844	67	Route N / Route T – Republic, Bois D'Arc	
Greene		68.958	110.977	69	Route 360 east (James River Freeway) to US 60	
Greene		70.166	112.921	70	Route B / Route MM	
Greene		72.472	116.632	72	I-44 BL / Route 266 (Chestnut Expressway)	Former US 66; access to Missouri State University, Drury University, Ozarks Technical Community College, Springfield-Branson National Airport, Downtown Springfield, Battlefield Mall, and Bass Pro Shops
Greene	Springfield	75.480	121.473	75	US 160 (West Bypass) – Willard	Access to Bois D'Arc Conservation Area and Andy Dalton Shooting Range
Greene	Springfield	77.713	125.067	77	Route 13 (Kansas Expressway) – Bolivar	First diverging diamond interchange in North America, existing interchange converted in 2009; access to Fantastic Caverns, Ozark Empire Fairgrounds, and Dickerson Park Zoo
Greene	Springfield	80.372	129.346	80	I-44 BL / Route H (Glenstone Avenue) – Pleasant Hope	Access to Evangel University
Greene	Springfield	82.465	132.715	82	US 65 – Branson, Sedalia	Signed as exits 82A (south) and 82B (north); access to Table Rock Lake, Bull Shoals Lake, the Missouri Sports Hall of Fame, Missouri State University, Drury University, and Ozarks Technical Community College
Greene	Springfield	84.734	136.366	84	Route 744 (Mulroy Road / Beaver Road)	
Greene	Strafford	88.917	143.098	88	Route 125 – Strafford, Fair Grove	Future dogbone interchange
Webster		96.021	154.531	96	Route B – Northview	
Webster	Marshfield	100.938	162.444	100	Route W / Route 38 – Marshfield	
Webster		103.000	165.762	103	Route CC	dumbbell interchange
Webster		107.553	173.090	107	Sampson Road / Sparkle Brook Road	
Laclede	Conway	113.230	182.226	113	Route J / Route Y – Conway	
Laclede	Phillipsburg	118.027	189.946	118	Route A / Route C – Phillipsburg	Former US 66
Laclede		123.011	197.967	123	County Road	
Laclede	Lebanon	127.207	204.720	127	Route W (Elm Street) / Evergreen Pkwy	Former US 66
Laclede	Lebanon	129.057	207.697	129	Route 5 / Route 32 / Route 64 (Jefferson Avenue) – Hartville	Access to the Lake of the Ozarks, Bennett Spring State Park, and Pomme de Terre Lake
Laclede	Lebanon	130.160	209.472	130	Route MM (Elm Street)	Access to Mercy Hospital
Laclede		135.239	217.646	135	Route F – Sleeper	Former US 66
Laclede		139.999	225.307	140	Route N / Route T – Stoutland	
Pulaski		145.711	234.499	145	Route 133 / Route AB – Richland	
Pulaski		150.630	242.415	150	Route 7 / Route P – Richland, Laquey	
Pulaski		153.411	246.891	153	Route 17 – Buckhorn	
Pulaski	Waynesville	156.396	251.695	156	Route H / I-44 BL – Waynesville, Fort Leonard Wood	Access to the Missouri Veterans Cemetery
Pulaski	St. Robert	159.832	257.225	159	I-44 BL – St. Robert, Waynesville	Former US 66
Pulaski	St. Robert	161.160	259.362	161	I-44 BL / Route Y – St. Robert, Fort Leonard Wood	Access to Waynesville-St. Robert Regional Airport and U.S. Army Museums at Fort Leonard Wood
Pulaski		163.836	263.668	163	Route 28 – Dixon	
Phelps		169.086	272.118	169	Route J	
Phelps		172.574	277.731	172	Route D – Jerome, Dixon	No westbound entrance
Phelps		176.531	284.099	176	Sugar Tree Road	
Phelps	Doolittle	179.447	288.792	179	Route C / Route T – Newburg, Doolittle	
Phelps	Rolla	184.579	297.051	184	I-44 BL east (Kingshighway) / Route 72 east to US 63 south – Rolla, Salem	Western terminus of Route 72; former US 66 east; access to Phelps Health Medical Group
Phelps	Rolla	185.651	298.776	185	Route E – Rolla	Access to Missouri University of Science and Technology and Phelps Health Medical Group
Phelps	Rolla	186.642	300.371	186	I-44 BL west / US 63 east (Bishop Avenue) / Route 72 – Rolla, Jefferson City	Former US 66
Phelps	Rolla	189.744	305.363	189	Route V (Hy Point Industrial Park Drive)	
Phelps	St. James	195.613	314.809	195	Route 8 (Jefferson Street) / Route 68 – St. James	Former US 66; access to Ozark National Scenic Riverways and Meramac Spring Park
Crawford		203.388	327.321	203	Route F / Route ZZ	
Crawford	Cuba	208.284	335.201	208	Route 19 – Cuba, Owensville	
Crawford		210.782	339.221	210	Route UU	
Crawford		214.250	344.802	214	Route H – Leasburg	Access to Onondaga Cave State Park
Crawford	Bourbon	218.492	351.629	218	Route C / Route J / Route N – Bourbon	
Franklin	Sullivan	224.286	360.953	225	Route 185 north / Route D – Sullivan	Access to Missouri Baptist Sullivan Hospital
Franklin		225.831	363.440	226	Route 185 south / Route AF – Sullivan, Potosi	Access to Meramec State Park
Franklin		230.240	370.535	230	Route W / Route JJ – Stanton	Access to Meramec Caverns
Franklin	St. Clair	238.816	384.337	239	Route 30 / Route AB / Route WW – St. Clair	
Franklin	St. Clair	240.309	386.740	240	Route 47 – St. Clair, Union	
Franklin		242.189	389.765	242	Route AH	
Franklin		247.088	397.650	247	US 50 west / Route O / Route AT – Union, Jefferson City	Western terminus of US 50 concurrency; access to Robertsville State Park and East Central College
Franklin	Villa Ridge	251.485	404.726	251	Route 100 west – Washington	Former US 66; access to Mercy Hospital
Franklin	Gray Summit	253.289	407.629	253	I-44 BL / Route 100 east – Gray Summit	Former US 66; access to Shaw Nature Reserve and Purina Farms
Franklin	Pacific	256.555	412.885	256	I-44 BL – Pacific	Signed as exit 257 westbound
St. Louis	Eureka	261.505	420.852	261	I-44 BL west / Six Flags Road	Access to Six Flags St. Louis
St. Louis	Eureka	264.459	425.606	264	Route 109 – Eureka	Access to Babler State Park and Don Robinson State Park
St. Louis	Eureka	265.262	426.898	265	Williams Road	Eastbound exit and entrance; access to Route 66 State Park
St. Louis		266.557	428.982	266	Lewis Road	Access to Route 66 State Park Visitor Center
St. Louis		268.788	432.572	269	Beaumont Antire Road	Access to Jay Henges Shooting Range
St. Louis	Valley Park	272.385	438.361	272	Route 141 – Fenton, Valley Park	Access to SSM Health St. Clare Hospital
St. Louis	Fenton	273.844	440.709	274A	Bowles Avenue	Signed as exit 274 westbound
St. Louis	Fenton	274.664	442.029	274B	Mraz Lane	Eastbound exit and westbound entrance
St. Louis	Fenton	275.630	443.583	275	North Highway Drive / Soccer Park Road	Westbound exit and eastbound entrance
St. Louis	Sunset Hills	275.872– 276.932	443.973– 445.679	276	I-270 – Memphis, Chicago	Access to St. Louis Lambert International Airport
St. Louis	Sunset Hills	276.132– 276.844	444.391– 445.537	277A	Route 366 east (Watson Road)	Eastbound exit and westbound entrance; former US 66
St. Louis	Sunset Hills–Kirkwood city line	277.619	446.784	277B	US 50 east / US 61 / US 67 (Lindbergh Boulevard)	Eastern terminus of US 50 concurrency; access to Historic Downtown Kirkwood, The Magic House, and Laumeier Sculpture Park
St. Louis	Kirkwood–Crestwood city line	278.634	448.418	278	Big Bend Road	
St. Louis	Oakland–Webster Groves line	279.736	450.191	279	Berry Road	Westbound exit and eastbound entrance
St. Louis	Webster Groves	280.739	451.806	280	Elm Avenue	Access to Historic Downtown Webster Groves and Webster University
St. Louis	Webster Groves–Shrewsbury line	282.300	454.318	282	Murdoch Avenue / Laclede Station Road	Eastbound exit and westbound entrance
St. Louis	Shrewsbury	282.485	454.616	283	Shrewsbury Avenue	Westbound exit and eastbound entrance
City of St. Louis		284.175	457.335	284A	Jamieson Avenue	Eastbound exit and westbound entrance
City of St. Louis		284.432	457.749	284B	Arsenal Street	Westbound exit and eastbound entrance
City of St. Louis		284.800	458.341	285	Southwest Avenue	Westbound exit and eastbound entrance
City of St. Louis		285.602	459.632	286	Hampton Avenue	Access to Forest Park, Saint Louis Art Museum, Missouri History Museum, and the Saint Louis Zoo
City of St. Louis		286.779	461.526	287A	Kingshighway Boulevard	Eastbound exit and westbound entrance; access to Tower Grove Park and Washington University Medical Center
City of St. Louis		287.127	462.086	287B	Vandeventer Avenue	Also signed westbound for Kingshighway Boulevard; access to Missouri Botanical Garden
City of St. Louis		288.254	463.900	288	Grand Boulevard	Access to Saint Louis University, Saint Louis University Hospital, SSM Health Cardinal Glennon Children's Hospital, John Cochran Veterans Hospital, and Missouri School for the Blind
City of St. Louis		289.265	465.527	289	Jefferson Avenue	Access to Enterprise Center and Union Station
City of St. Louis		289.595– 290.274	466.058– 467.151	290B	I-55 south – Memphis	Western terminus of concurrency with I-55; eastbound exit and westbound entrance; former eastern terminus of I-44
City of St. Louis		290.123	466.908	290A	Route 30 (12th Street / Gravois Avenue)	Westbound exit and eastbound entrance
City of St. Louis		290.296	467.186	290B	Lafayette Avenue	Eastbound exit and westbound entrance; former Route 755
City of St. Louis		290.591	467.661	290C	Park Avenue / 7th Street	
City of St. Louis		291.167– 291.528	468.588– 469.169	291A	I-55 north / I-64 / US 40 east to I-70 east – Illinois	Eastern terminus of concurrency with I-55; westbound exit and eastbound entrance
City of St. Louis		291.267	468.749	291B	Walnut Street	Eastbound exit and westbound entrance
City of St. Louis		291.369	468.913	292	Lumiere Place Boulevard / Washington Avenue / Eads Bridge	Eastbound exit and westbound entrance; access to the Gateway Arch
City of St. Louis		292.146	470.163	292A	Convention Plaza / Martin L. King Bridge – Illinois	Westbound exit and eastbound entrance; access to IL 3, I-55, I-70, and I-64
City of St. Louis					I-70 Express Lanes	Westbound entrance only
City of St. Louis		292.605	470.902	292B	Broadway	Westbound exit and eastbound entrance
City of St. Louis		292.919	471.407	293	Madison Street / St. Louis Avenue	Eastbound exit only; access to Municipal River Terminal
City of St. Louis		293.183	471.832		I-70 west – Kansas City	Eastern terminus
1.000 mi = 1.609 km; 1.000 km = 0.621 mi: Concurrency terminus; HOV only; Incomplete access; Tolled

== Business loops ==
All of I-44's business routes are in Missouri. Most of these business loops were the former US 66. Missouri also has the unusual occurrence of a business loop and business spur from the same Interstate intersecting (the Waynesville–St. Robert loop and the Ft. Leonard Wood spur).

Interstate 44
Previous state: Oklahoma	Missouri	Next state: Terminus
