= Buckhorn, Pulaski County, Missouri =

Unincorporated community in Pulaski County, Missouri, United States

Coordinates: 37°46′59″N 92°16′10″W

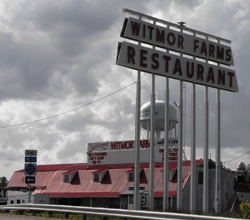
Witmor Farms Restaurant

Buckhorn is an unincorporated community in Pulaski County, Missouri, United States.

== Description ==
The community is located along Missouri Route 17 just south of its junction with Interstate 44. It is also on historic U.S. Route 66. The community is within the Mark Twain National Forest and the northwest corner of Fort Leonard Wood is three miles (4.8 km) to the east. Waynesville is six miles (9.7 km) to the northeast along Route 44 and Laquey is two miles (3.2 km) to the southwest off of Route 17.

== History ==
The community was so named on account of the image of a buckhorn on a local tavern sign.

The Decker Cave Archeological Site was listed on the National Register of Historic Places in 1971.
