= Interstate 64 in Missouri =

Highway in the U.S. state of Missouri

Interstate 64
- U.S. Route 40
- I-64 highlighted in red

Route information
- Maintained by MoDOT
- Length: 40.817 mi (65.689 km)
- Existed: 1987–present
- NHS: Entire route

Major junctions
- West end: I-70 / US 40 / US 61 in Wentzville
- Route 364 in Lake St. Louis; I-270 in Town and Country; US 61 / US 67 in Frontenac; I-170 in Richmond Heights; I-44 / I-55 in St. Louis
- East end: I-55 / I-64 / US 40 at the Illinois state line in St. Louis

Location
- Country: United States
- State: Missouri
- Counties: St. Charles, St. Louis, City of St. Louis

Highway system
- Interstate Highway System; Main; Auxiliary; Suffixed; Business; Future; Missouri State Highway System; Interstate; US; State; Supplemental
| ← US 63 | → Route 64 |

Interstate 64 (I-64) passes through the Greater St. Louis area in the US state of Missouri. The entire route is concurrent with U.S. Route 40 (US 40). Because the road was a main thoroughfare in the St. Louis area before the development of the Interstate Highway System, it is not uncommon for locals to refer to the stretch of highway as "Highway 40" rather than "I-64". On December 6, 2009, the portion of the highway running through the city of St. Louis was named the Jack Buck Memorial Highway in honor of the late sportscaster.

== Route description ==
I-64 begins at an interchange with I-70, US 40, and US 61 in St. Charles County and heads south. Previously, the freeway was a divided highway signed only as US 40 with at-grade intersections, which were slowly converted to limited-access exits. The final intersection at Callahan Road was removed on October 14, 2009. The next major exit is for Route N and the western terminus of Route 364. Route 364 was completed and opened on November 2, 2014. From here, I-64 continues past interchanges with Route DD/Winghaven Boulevard, Route 94, and Research Park Circle and then crosses the Missouri River via the Daniel Boone Bridge and enters St. Louis County.

The freeway travels through the congested Chesterfield Valley, where it gains a fourth lane and then meets I-270 at a flyover interchange built in the early 1990s in the city of Town and Country. Continuing east, I-64 remains four lanes and travels through the affluent areas of Frontenac and Ladue. The next major interchange is I-170 in the city of Richmond Heights. This stretch, located between Ballas Road and I-170, was closed in 2008 for a complete reconstruction, at which point substandard exits were upgraded and the fourth lane was added. The interchange with I-170 was also overhauled, creating a full interchange with highspeed ramps in all directions. The reconstructed expressway opened to traffic on the morning of December 15, 2008.

East of the interchange with I-170, I-64 drops a lane and stays at three throughlanes to Clayton Road. Through here, the expressway passes through older neighborhoods and enters into the city of St. Louis. After readding a fourth lane, the freeway skirts the southern edge of Forest Park. In this area, one finds both the Saint Louis Science Center and Saint Louis Zoo. Kingshighway marks the end of the completely reconstructed eastern half, where again outdated exits were updated and shoulders widened. The eastern half was closed from December 15, 2008, to December 7, 2009. I-64's speed limit drops from 60 to 55 mph (97 to 89 km/h) east of Kingshighway and drops a lane at Vandeventer Avenue (the opposite of the westbound lanes). Passing by Saint Louis University, the freeway becomes double-decked for the first time (eastbound lanes at a lower level; westbound lanes at an upper one), gaining back a fourth lane east of Compton Avenue. Another lane drop occurs at the Chestnut and 20th Street exit, where the canceled Route 755 was to interchange. The freeway passes just south of the Enterprise Center and again becomes double-decked in the same arrangement, passing within 50 feet (15 m) of the New Busch Stadium. The route becomes two lanes as it approaches the Mississippi River and the Poplar Street Bridge, where it is intersects I-55 and I-44 at an incomplete interchange; it was also at this interchange that I-70 joined I-55 and I-64 to cross the Poplar Street Bridge, but its former downtown route is now an extension of I-44. Eastbound I-64 cannot directly access either one of the other routes, but westbound I-64, however, can directly access both. I-64 continues into Illinois concurrent with I-55; until 2014, it also ran concurrent with I-70, which has since been rerouted onto the Stan Musial Veterans Memorial Bridge further upstream.

== History ==
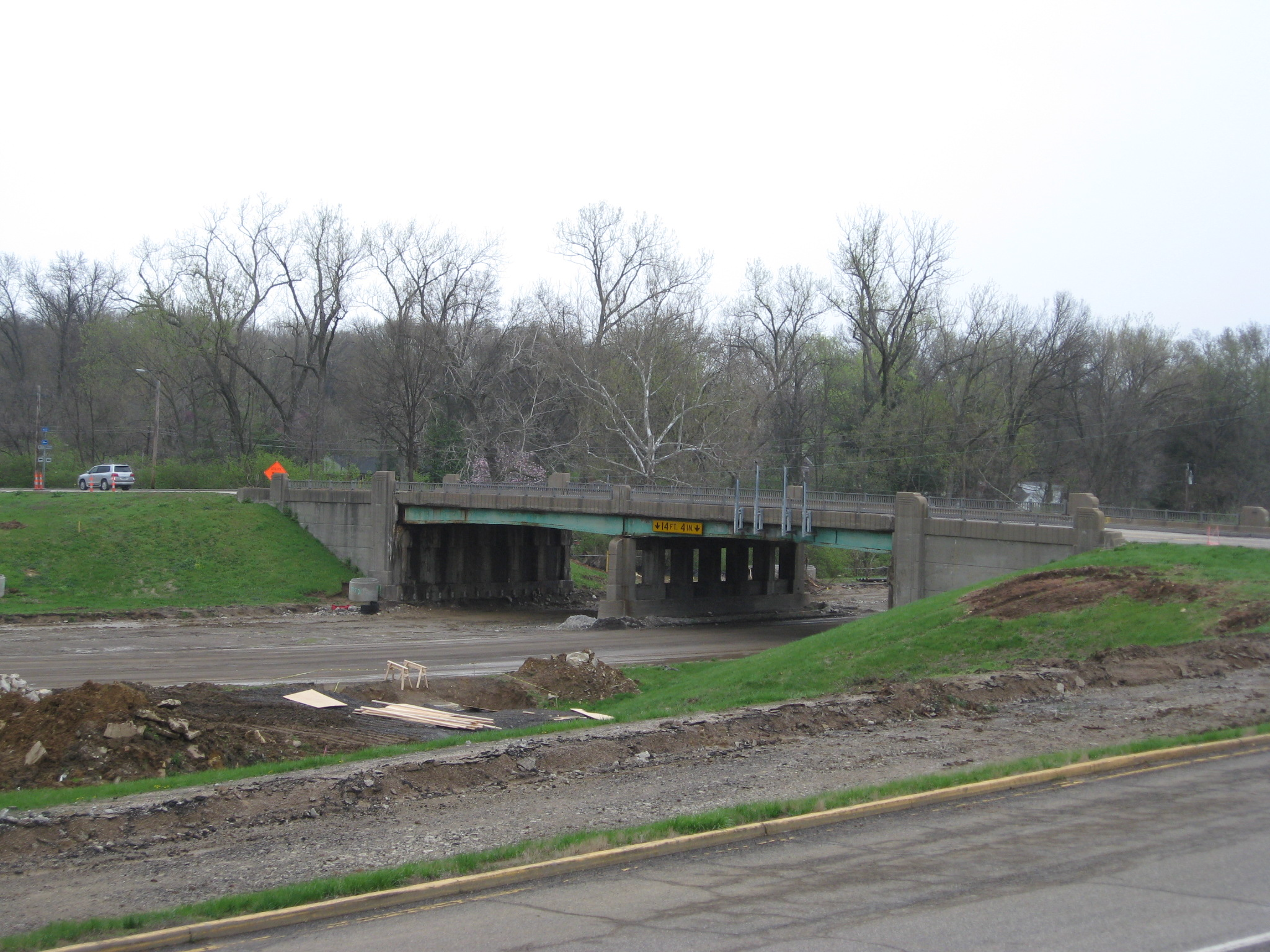
In 2008, I-64/US 40 was closed in this area for a complete reconstruction between 2008 and 2009. Shown is the Spoede Road overpass above I-64. This overpass was demolished in June 2008.

=== Initial construction ===
Before the Interstate Highway System, US 40 was a main thoroughfare through St. Louis and Kansas City. From each state line, there were signs saying "Future I-55/I-64 Corridor" and "Future I-70 Corridor".

=== Reconstruction ===
The Missouri Department of Transportation (MoDOT) rebuilt the stretch of I-64 from Spoede Road to Kingshighway Boulevard between 2008 and 2009. The project included new concrete pavement on the highway; approximately 25 rebuilt bridges; and several reconfigured interchanges, including a new freeway-to-freeway interchange at I-170.

The section between Spoede Road and I-170 was closed for reconstruction on January 2, 2008, and opened to traffic on December 15, 2008. The section between I-170 and Kingshighway Boulevard was closed on December 15, 2008, and reopened to traffic on December 7, 2009. The project was completed with a dedication and opening day ceremony on Sunday, December 6. In 2020, exits 39 and 38B were closed and demolished to make way for the CityPark, a new soccer-specific stadium for St. Louis City SC on the site. The ramps were the remnants of a 3.3-mile-long (5.3 km) north–south distributor highway that was never built.

== Exit list ==
| County | Location | mi | km | Exit | Destinations | Notes |
|---|---|---|---|---|---|---|
| St. Charles | Wentzville | 0.000– 0.305 | 0.000– 0.491 | 1 | US 61 north / Avenue of the Saints – Hannibal I-70 / US 40 west – Kansas City, St. Louis | Western terminus; signed as exits 1A (I-70/US 40 west) and 1B (I-70 east); exit 210 on I-70; western end of concurrency with US 40/US 61/AOTS; cloverleaf interchange |
| St. Charles | Lake St. Louis | 1.433 | 2.306 | 1C | Prospect Road | |
| St. Charles | Lake St. Louis | 3.038 | 4.889 | 2 | Lake Saint Louis Boulevard | |
| St. Charles | Lake St. Louis | 3.926 | 6.318 | 4A | Route N | Exits 1A-B on SR 364; cloverleaf interchange |
| St. Charles | Lake St. Louis | 4.326 | 6.962 | 4B | Route 364 east | Exits 1A-B on SR 364; cloverleaf interchange |
| St. Charles | O'Fallon | 6.275 | 10.099 | 6 | Route DD (Winghaven Boulevard) | |
| St. Charles | O'Fallon | 9.995 | 16.085 | 9 | Route K – O'Fallon | |
| St. Charles | Weldon Spring | 10.726 | 17.262 | 10 | Route 94 – St. Charles | Eastbound exit is via exit 9 |
| St. Charles | Weldon Spring | 11.928 | 19.196 | 11 | Research Park Circle | No westbound entrance |
| Missouri River | | 13.186 | 21.221 | Daniel Boone Bridge | | |
| St. Louis | Chesterfield | 13.757– 14.043 | 22.140– 22.600 | 14 | Chesterfield Airport Road | Eastbound exit and westbound entrance |
| St. Louis | Chesterfield | 14.651 | 23.578 | 14 | Spirit of Saint Louis Boulevard | Westbound exit and eastbound entrance |
| St. Louis | Chesterfield | 14.917– 16.204 | 24.007– 26.078 | 16 | Long Road / Chesterfield Airport Road | Westbound exit and eastbound entrance |
| St. Louis | Chesterfield | 17.150 | 27.600 | 17 | Boone's Crossing | |
| St. Louis | Chesterfield | 19.221 | 30.933 | 19A | Chesterfield Parkway West | |
| St. Louis | Chesterfield | 19.848 | 31.942 | 19B | Route 340 (Olive Boulevard / Clarkson Road) | |
| St. Louis | Chesterfield | 20.50 | 32.99 | 20 | Chesterfield Parkway East | Westbound exit and eastbound entrance |
| St. Louis | Chesterfield | 20.316 | 32.695 | 21 | Timberlake Manor Parkway | |
| St. Louis | Town and Country | 22.553 | 36.296 | 22 | Route 141 (Woods Mill Road) | |
| St. Louis | Town and Country | 23.231 | 37.387 | 23 | Maryville Centre Drive | No eastbound exit |
| St. Louis | Town and Country | 24.186 | 38.924 | 24 | Mason Road | |
| St. Louis | Town and Country | 25.886 | 41.659 | 25 | I-270 north – Chicago I-270 south – Memphis | Exit 12 on I-270 north, exits 12A-B on I-270 south |
| St. Louis | Town and Country | 26.207 | 42.176 | 26 | Route JJ (Ballas Road) | Access to Mercy Hospital, Missouri Baptist Medical Center, and Covenant Seminary |
| St. Louis | Frontenac | 27.745 | 44.651 | 27 | Spoede Road | |
| St. Louis | Frontenac | 28.267 | 45.491 | 28A | US 61 south / US 67 / Lewis and Clark Trail west / Historic US 66 (Lindbergh Boulevard); Avenue of the Saints ends | Eastern end of concurrency with US 61; western end of concurrency with LCT; national southern terminus of the Avenue of the Saints |
| St. Louis | Ladue | 28.862 | 46.449 | 28B | Clayton Road | Westbound exit and eastbound entrance |
| St. Louis | Ladue | 30.735 | 49.463 | 30 | McKnight Road | |
| St. Louis | Richmond Heights | 31.770– 32.249 | 51.129– 51.900 | 31B-A | I-170 north / Brentwood Boulevard / Hanley Road | Signed separately as exits 31B (Hanley/Brentwood) and 31A (I-170) westbound; exits 1A-B-C on I-170; southern terminus of I-170; access to St. Louis Lambert International Airport |
| St. Louis | Richmond Heights | | | 32 | Laclede Station Road | Former westbound exit and eastbound entrance; removed 2007 |
| St. Louis | Richmond Heights | 33.071 | 53.223 | 33A | Big Bend Boulevard | |
| St. Louis | Richmond Heights | 33.462 | 53.852 | 33B | Bellevue Avenue | Eastbound exit; westbound entrance via collector road connected to exit 33A |
| City of St. Louis | | 33.807 | 54.407 | 33C | McCausland Avenue | |
| City of St. Louis | | 34.042 | 54.785 | 34A | Clayton Road / Skinker Boulevard | Westbound exit and eastbound entrance |
| City of St. Louis | | 34.949 | 56.245 | 34B | Hampton Avenue / Oakland Avenue | Oakland Ave. not signed westbound; access to Forest Park and the Saint Louis Zoo |
| City of St. Louis | | 36.111 | 58.115 | 36A | Kingshighway Boulevard | Access to Barnes-Jewish Hospital, St. Louis Children's Hospital, Forest Park, the Missouri Botanical Garden, Ranken Technical College, the St. Louis Science Center, and St. Louis Community College |
| City of St. Louis | | 36.722– 36.800 | 59.098– 59.224 | 36B | Tower Grove Avenue / Boyle Avenue | Tower Grove Ave. not signed westbound |
| City of St. Louis | | 37.361 | 60.127 | 36C | Vandeventer Avenue | Eastbound exit and westbound entrance; access to the Missouri Botanical Garden |
| City of St. Louis | | 37.750 | 60.753 | 37A | Market Street / Bernard Street | Eastbound exit and westbound entrance |
| City of St. Louis | | 37.825 | 60.873 | 37B | Grand Boulevard | Eastbound exit and westbound entrance; access to Saint Louis University Hospital |
| City of St. Louis | | 38.000– 38.262 | 61.155– 61.577 | 38A | Forest Park Avenue / Grand Boulevard | Westbound exit and eastbound entrance; access to Forest Park, Chaifetz Arena and Washington University |
| City of St. Louis | | | | 38B | Market Street (3000 West) | Westbound exit and eastbound entrance; exit removed in 2020 due to the construction of CityPark |
| City of St. Louis | | 38.793 | 62.431 | 38A | Jefferson Avenue | Westbound access via exit 38B |
| City of St. Louis | | | | 38B | Chestnut Street at 20th Street | Eastbound exit and westbound entrance; former Missouri State Route 755; exit removed in 2020 due to the construction of CityPark |
| City of St. Louis | | 39.124 | 62.964 | 38B | 22nd Street | Access to CityPark and St. Louis Union Station |
| City of St. Louis | | | | 39 | Market Street at 21st Street | Westbound exit and eastbound entrance; former Missouri State Route 755; exit removed in 2020 due to the construction of CityPark |
| City of St. Louis | | 39.646 | 63.804 | 39A | 14th Street | Eastbound exit and westbound entrance; access to the Enterprise Center and the Stifel Theatre; entrance ramp includes direct ramp from Clark Avenue |
| City of St. Louis | | 39.806 | 64.062 | 39B | 11th Street | Eastbound exit only; access to Busch Stadium |
| City of St. Louis | | 39.806 | 64.062 | 39B | 10th Street / Clark Avenue | Westbound entrance only |
| City of St. Louis | | 40.011 | 64.391 | 40 | 6th Street | No westbound exit; last Missouri exit eastbound |
| City of St. Louis | | 40.140 | 64.599 | 40A | 9th Street / Tucker Boulevard | Westbound exit only; access to Busch Stadium |
| City of St. Louis | | 40.369 | 64.968 | 40C | I-44 west / I-55 south – Tulsa, Memphis | Closed; consolidated with exit 40B; was westbound exit and eastbound entrance |
| City of St. Louis | | 40.407 | 65.029 | 40B | I-44 east to I-70 west / Walnut Street – Kansas City I-44 west / I-55 south – Tulsa, Memphis | Western end of concurrency with I-55; westbound exit and eastbound entrance; access to St. Louis Lambert International Airport |
| Mississippi River | | 40.817 | 65.689 | Poplar Street Bridge | | |
| Mississippi River | | 40.817 | 65.689 | | I-55 north / I-64 east / US 40 east / Lewis and Clark Trail east to I-70 east – Illinois | Continuation into Illinois |
1.000 mi = 1.609 km; 1.000 km = 0.621 mi: Closed/former; Concurrency terminus; Incomplete access

== See also ==
Interstate 64
| Previous state: Terminus | Missouri | Next state: Illinois |
