= Steed =

Steed may refer to:

== People with the name ==
- Steed Malbranque (born 1980), French footballer
- Edward Steed (born 1987), British cartoonist
- Joel Steed (born 1969), American football player
- Maggie Steed (born 1946), British actress
- Michael Steed (born 1940), British political scientist
- Thomas W. Steed (1904–1973), American air force commander
- Thomas Joseph Steed (1826–1910), Mormon pioneer
- Tom Steed (1904–1983), American politician
- Trent Steed (born 1977), Australian swimmer
- Wickham Steed (1871–1956), British journalist and historian

== Arts, entertainment, and media ==
=== Fictional characters ===
- Emma Steed, fictional character in the Marvel Comics universe
- John Steed, fictional character in the television series The Avengers
- The Steed family, the fictional main protagonists of The Work and the Glory

=== Other uses in arts, entertainment, and media ===
- Steed Records, American record label
- "The Steeds of Time", in the God of War II video game

== Other uses ==
- Steed, a unicorn like animal on British seal
- Steed, the Yorkshire tennis partnership of Stephen Iveson and Edward Harrison
- Steed, an animal such as a horse trained for riding
- 13715 Steed, main-belt asteroid
- Great Wall Steed, Chinese pickup truck
- Send tape echo echo delay, an audio recording effect
- USS W. L. Steed (ID-3449), United States Navy tanker ship
- The Steed, a 2019 film

== See also ==
- Stead (disambiguation)
- Steede (disambiguation)
