= STED =

STED may refer to:

- STED microscopy (stimulated emission depletion)
- STED sewer (septic tank effluent drainage)
- Septic tank effluent rainage system, a type of Sanitary sewer

== See also ==
- Stead (disambiguation)
