= Avesta (locality) =

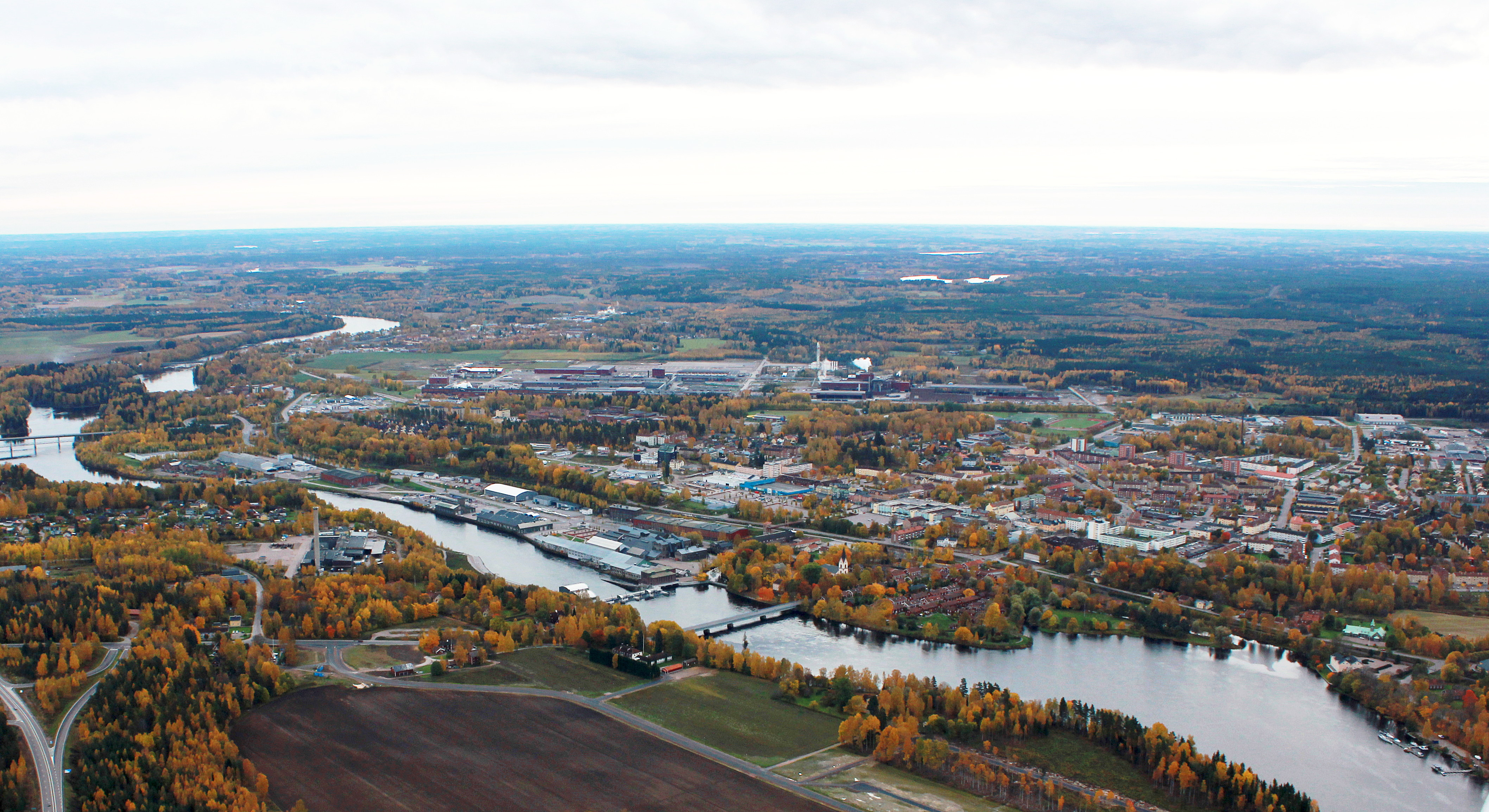
- Avesta in October 2010

- Location within Dalarna Location within Sweden
- Coordinates: 60°08′44″N 16°10′06″E
- Country: Sweden
- Province: Dalarna
- County: Dalarna County
- Municipality: Avesta Municipality

Area
  - Total: 13.91 km^{2} (5.37 sq mi)
- Elevation: 89 m (292 ft)

Population (31 December 2015)
  - Total: 11,949
  - Density: 1,109/km^{2} (2,870/sq mi)
- Time zone: UTC+1 (CET)
  - Summer (DST): UTC+2 (CEST)
- Postal code: 774 xx
- Area code: (+46) 226
- Climate: Dfb
- Website: Official website

Avesta (Swedish: [ˈɑ̂ːvɛsta]) is a locality and the seat of Avesta Municipality in Dalarna County, Sweden, with 11,949 inhabitants in 2015.

The name of Avesta is first found in 1303 as "Aghastadhum". The Swedish Aghe is of similar origin as the word å, meaning stream, in this case the Avestafors, a tributary of the river Dalälven. The Swedish Stadhum was the dative plural of a word of similar origin as the English word stead, or farm. The present name of the town is identical with that of the ancient Persian language and scriptures, but there is no apparent linguistic connection between them.

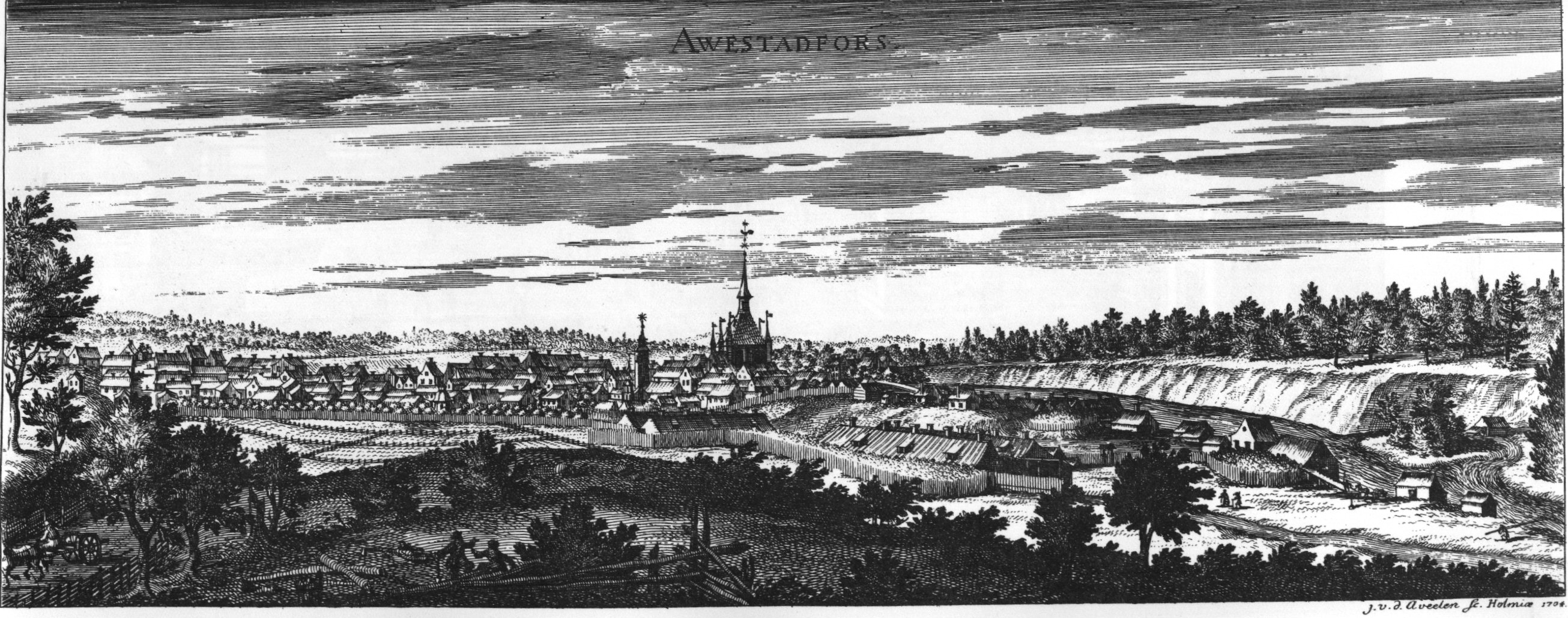
The Avestadfors settlement, c. 1700, in Suecia antiqua et hodierna

== History ==
In the Scandinavian Middle Ages there was a blast furnace at the location. In 1636 the construction of a giant copper mine was initiated near the Avesta fors.

The town Avesta received partial privileges in 1641 as a town under the city of Falun, and in 1644 a copper mint was built. However, the privileges were withdrawn in 1688 due to complaints of competition from its neighbour, mainly Falun. Copper coins were continued to be minted until 1831, and the copper works was in function until 1869.

Full city rights were regranted in 1919. The designated coat of arms depict the signs for copper and iron.

== Geography ==
The town is located by the Dalecarlia River (Dalälven).

The railway junction Krylbo is situated in Avesta.

== Climate ==
Avesta has a humid continental climate with sizeable seasonal differences although much less than would be expected for an interior climate north of 60°N. Being situated at the foot of the higher areas to its west, summer temperatures are warm because of the relatively low elevation of around 100 metres (330 ft) above sea level. Precipitation is quite high by standards of Sweden's areas closer to the Baltic Sea, which renders the possibility of heavy snowfall in winter.

Climate data for Avesta (2002–2020 averages; extremes since 1977)
Month	Jan	Feb	Mar	Apr	May	Jun	Jul	Aug	Sep	Oct	Nov	Dec	Year
Record high °C (°F)	9.9 (49.8)	12.4 (54.3)	19.0 (66.2)	27.3 (81.1)	28.9 (84.0)	31.7 (89.1)	33.5 (92.3)	34.1 (93.4)	26.5 (79.7)	19.1 (66.4)	14.7 (58.5)	12.4 (54.3)	34.1 (93.4)
Mean maximum °C (°F)	5.9 (42.6)	7.8 (46.0)	13.8 (56.8)	19.5 (67.1)	24.9 (76.8)	27.9 (82.2)	29.4 (84.9)	28.1 (82.6)	22.2 (72.0)	15.6 (60.1)	10.4 (50.7)	7.0 (44.6)	30.4 (86.7)
Mean daily maximum °C (°F)	−0.8 (30.6)	0.4 (32.7)	5.0 (41.0)	11.6 (52.9)	17.0 (62.6)	21.0 (69.8)	23.3 (73.9)	21.6 (70.9)	16.5 (61.7)	9.1 (48.4)	4.0 (39.2)	0.9 (33.6)	10.8 (51.4)
Daily mean °C (°F)	−3.5 (25.7)	−2.4 (27.7)	0.8 (33.4)	6.1 (43.0)	11.2 (52.2)	15.4 (59.7)	17.8 (64.0)	16.5 (61.7)	12.0 (53.6)	5.8 (42.4)	1.7 (35.1)	−1.6 (29.1)	6.7 (44.0)
Mean daily minimum °C (°F)	−6.1 (21.0)	−5.6 (21.9)	−3.5 (25.7)	0.5 (32.9)	5.3 (41.5)	9.7 (49.5)	12.3 (54.1)	11.4 (52.5)	7.5 (45.5)	2.5 (36.5)	−0.6 (30.9)	−4.1 (24.6)	2.4 (36.4)
Mean minimum °C (°F)	−16.6 (2.1)	−15.8 (3.6)	−12.9 (8.8)	−5.9 (21.4)	−1.5 (29.3)	3.5 (38.3)	7.3 (45.1)	5.2 (41.4)	0.4 (32.7)	−5.2 (22.6)	−9.0 (15.8)	−13.8 (7.2)	−19.6 (−3.3)
Record low °C (°F)	−27.6 (−17.7)	−27.7 (−17.9)	−23.3 (−9.9)	−18.0 (−0.4)	−6.1 (21.0)	0.0 (32.0)	4.2 (39.6)	1.5 (34.7)	−5.2 (22.6)	−9.9 (14.2)	−15.6 (3.9)	−27.3 (−17.1)	−27.7 (−17.9)
Average precipitation mm (inches)	51.6 (2.03)	38.5 (1.52)	34.3 (1.35)	29.9 (1.18)	51.0 (2.01)	70.1 (2.76)	74.4 (2.93)	82.5 (3.25)	44.3 (1.74)	63.7 (2.51)	58.6 (2.31)	52.7 (2.07)	651.6 (25.66)
Average extreme snow depth cm (inches)	27 (11)	32 (13)	29 (11)	9 (3.5)	0 (0)	0 (0)	0 (0)	0 (0)	0 (0)	0 (0)	9 (3.5)	18 (7.1)	39 (15)
Source 1: SMHI Open Data
Source 2: SMHI Open Data

== Sightseeing ==
- The city of Avesta has the world's largest Dalecarlian horse. The horse statue is made of concrete.
- Koppardalen Verket is a popular attraction in Avesta. It is a former ironworks that began operations in 1874. It is now a museum and hosts art exhibits.
- Metropoolen is an indoor swimming pool and adventure area in Avesta. It includes a 78-meter-long water slide.
- Avesta Visentpark (Avesta Bison Park) has about 25 European bison. The park has a cafe, a historic home from the 1930s, and a children's playhouse.

== Notable people ==
- Retired NHL defenceman Nicklas Lidström
- Swedish footballer Lina Hurtig
- PWHL defencewoman Maja Nylén Persson
- Tony Rickardsson
- Armand Duplantis, whose mother Helena is from Avesta

=== Bands ===
- Scar Symmetry
