= Kindred =

Kindred or The Kindred may refer to:

== Arts and entertainment ==
=== Film and television ===
- Kindred (film), a 2020 British horror film
- The Kindred (1987 film), an American horror film
- The Kindred (2021 film), a British horror film
- Kindred (TV series), 2022, based on the Butler novel
- Kindred: The Embraced, a 1996 American TV series
- "Kindred" (Heroes), an episode of the science fiction TV series
- "Kindred", an episode of Star Wars Rebels
- "The Kindred", an episode in Stargate Atlantis season 4

=== Literature ===
- Kindred (novel), by Octavia E. Butler, 1979
- Kindred: Neanderthal Life, Love, Death and Art, a 2020 book by Rebecca Wragg Sykes
- Predator: Kindred, a Predator comic

=== Music ===
- Kindred (Jacky Terrasson and Stefon Harris album), 2001
- Kindred (Passion Pit album), 2015
- Kindred, a 2011 album by Farpoint
- Kindred (EP), by Burial, 2012
- The Kindred (band), a Canadian progressive rock sextet
- Kindred the Family Soul, an American neo soul duo
- "Kindred" (song), by A Perfect Circle, 2024

=== Other uses in arts and entertainment ===
- Kindred (Marvel Comics), the name of several fictional characters
- The Kindred, an Amish-like community in The X-Files' episode "Gender Bender"
- Police Quest III: The Kindred, a 1991 video game

== Businesses ==
- Kindred (company), a home exchange company
- Kindred Group, an online gambling operator
- Kindred Healthcare, an American company

== People ==
- Dave Kindred (born 1941), American sportswriter
- Flash Flanagan (born Christopher Kindred, 1974), American professional wrestler
- John J. Kindred (1864–1937), U.S. Representative from New York
- Lisa Kindred (1940–2019), American folk and blues singer
- Nyree Kindred (born 1980), Welsh swimmer
- Parker Kindred, American drummer
- Sascha Kindred (born 1977), British swimmer
- Kindred McLeary (1901–1949), American architect, artist, and educator
- Kindred Jenkins Morris (1819–1884), American Democratic politician

== Places ==
- Kindred, North Dakota, United States
- Kindred, Tasmania, aAustralia

== Other uses ==
- Kindred, a barley cultivar
- Kindred, a group in the new religious movement Heathenry

== See also ==
- Kindred Spirits (disambiguation)
