= Steede =

Steede is a surname common in Bermuda. Notable people with the name include:

- Albert Steede (born 1968), Bermudian cricketer
- Kwame Steede (born 1980), Bermudian footballer
- London Steede-Jackson (born 1994), Bermudian footballer
- Ottis Steede (born 1974), Bermudian footballer
- Ronan Steede (born 1991/1992), Irish Gaelic footballer
- Ryan Steede (born 1975), Bermudian cricketer
- Tumaini Steede (1990–2012), Bermudian footballer
