= The "Mexican Problem" =

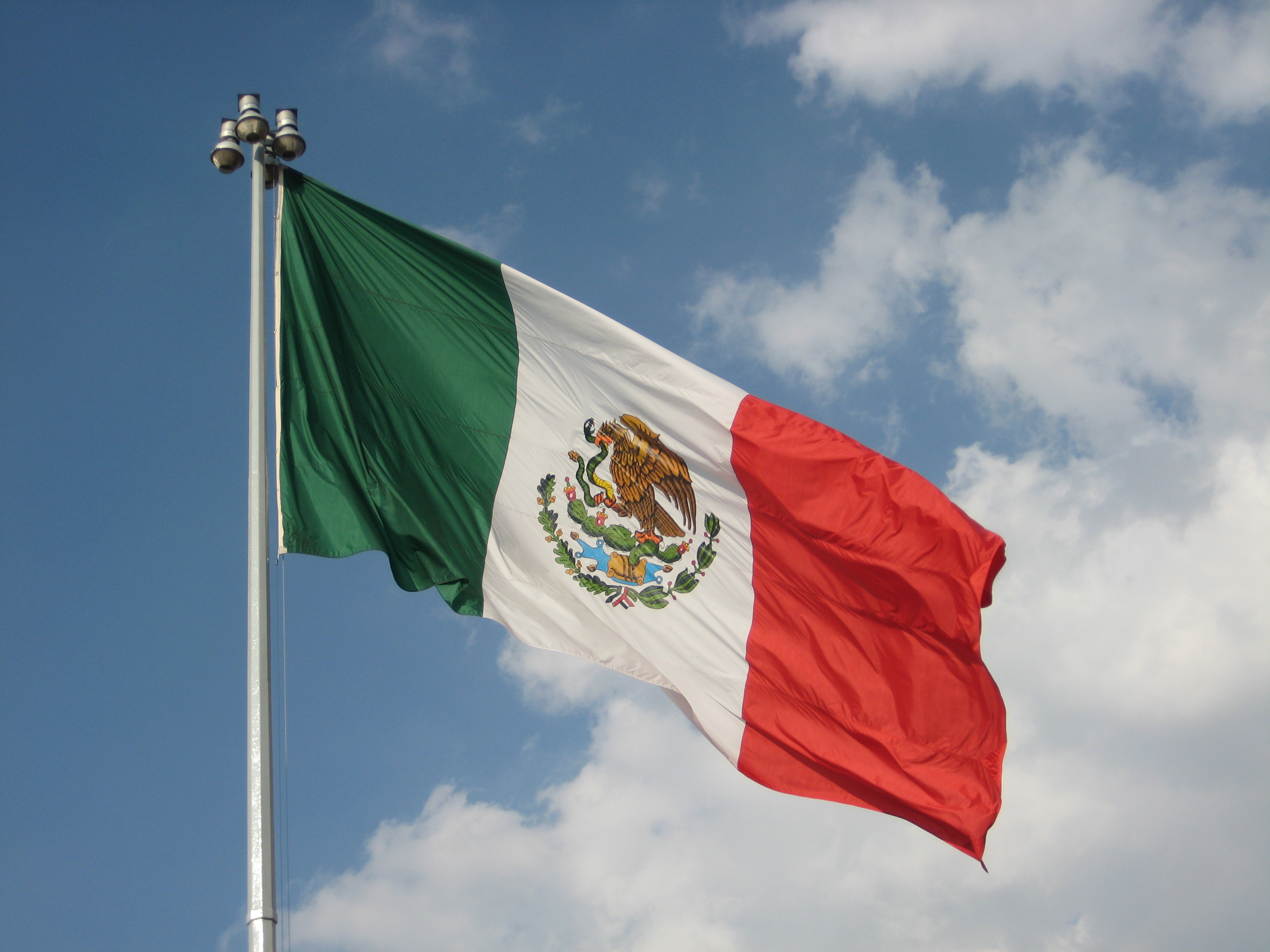
Flag of Mexico.

The "Mexican Problem" is a concept that originally developed somewhere in the late 19th century, early 20th century due to different influential American perspectives, that became derogatory, about how to define a person from Mexico. The perspective that was created about the Mexican citizen and Latinos perceived as Mexican living in the United States was formed due to many sources, a significant portion of those contributions being literary: even from professional or religious opinions.

One such scholar Emory Bogardus wrote a book called Essentials of Americanization directed towards principals in California. The book was meant to educate on the "Mexican Problem" but it was discovered later that much of what was discussed in the literary work caused segregation to become a greater issue in schools rather than truly seeking to understand how to help children from the Mexican culture. Views of Americanization such as these are what influenced the way Mexicans were treated as members of the US jurisdiction, and consequently what rights and positions they were given in a capitalistic society.

Perspectives were influenced from literature such as that written by George Winton directed towards Christian missionaries whose goal was to preach the gospel towards Mexicans. It was stated that Mexican culture and race were most closely related to being Oriental or Asiatic. They were also characterized as being a lower class associated with the rural lifestyle. They were stereotyped to have older cultural customs that were archaic and needed help catching up to the present or to become "Americanized". The "Mexican Problem" was targeted largely around immigrants from Mexico and became more prevalent when there was an influx of migrants coming over the border in search of greater economic stability and safer conditions after the Mexican Revolution.

There were different cultures associated with a Mexican citizen, one of the most prevalent being an indigenous heritage. Because they had "Indian blood" many immigrants were associated largely with perceptions about cultural aspects or stereotypes of the Native American people in the United States at the time. Mexicans were thought to be a people that were not hard-working or lazy and due to their association with indigenous culture that was perceived as lesser they were thought to also be "lawless and violent".

From an Anglo-American perspective, Mexicans were unable to become Americanized because they possessed many contributing factors that went directly opposite to that perceived American expectation. They were racialized very early on, making it difficult to move up to higher standards of living and to earn greater respect among their Anglo-American counterparts in society during the 20th century. Many Mexicans, due to marginalization did not have a desire to adopt Anglo-American culture and instead in order to combat Americanization leaned more towards nationalism and placed greater weight on their own culture.

== The Mexican Revolution ==
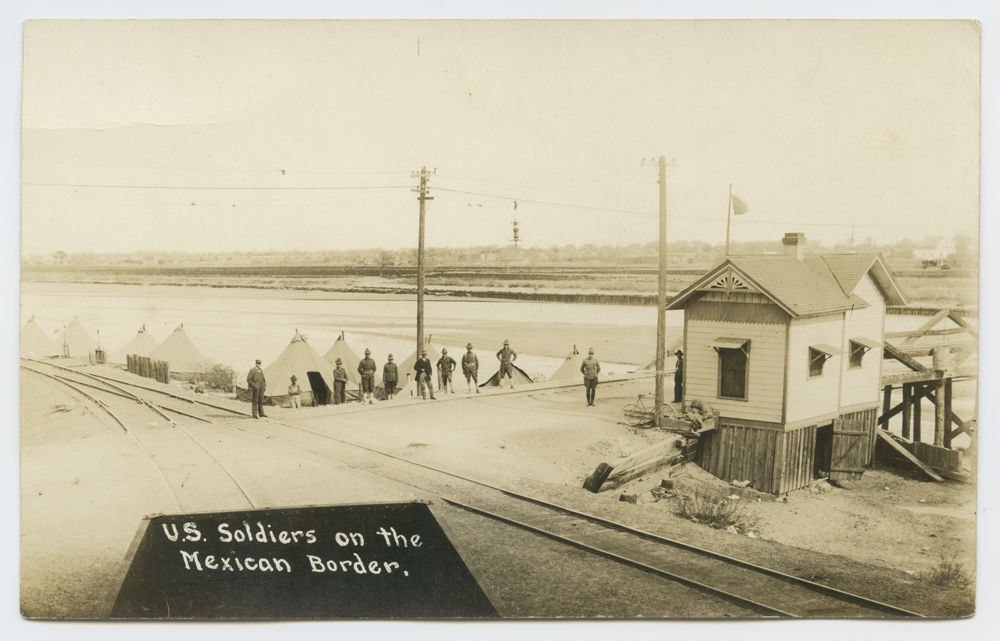
U.S. Soldiers on the Mexican Border.

In the years leading up to the Mexican Revolution there was a trend of foreign companies moving into Mexican cities in order to profit off of the natural resources that were found in different parts of the country. One of the large economical factions that influenced the social and political climate during the late 19th century, were foreign investors. There were companies including one stemming from the United States that employed Mexicans along with a range of racially diverse American workers. An especially prominent location of natural resources were the oil reserves discovered in Tampico, where some of these US businesses were stationed. A conflict of interest was that Mexicans were receiving lower wages than the other workers and because of this spoke out against their mistreatment. The US companies' defense was that their Mexican counterparts did not speak English and could not communicate well with their higher ups. Prior to the significant immigration that took place after the Mexican Revolution there was negative sentiment from Mexican citizens that the US already believed they were superior to Spanish speakers because of their imperialistic tendencies in other Latin American countries as well as Mexico. Because of these criticisms when the revolution started there were many protests against foreign companies.

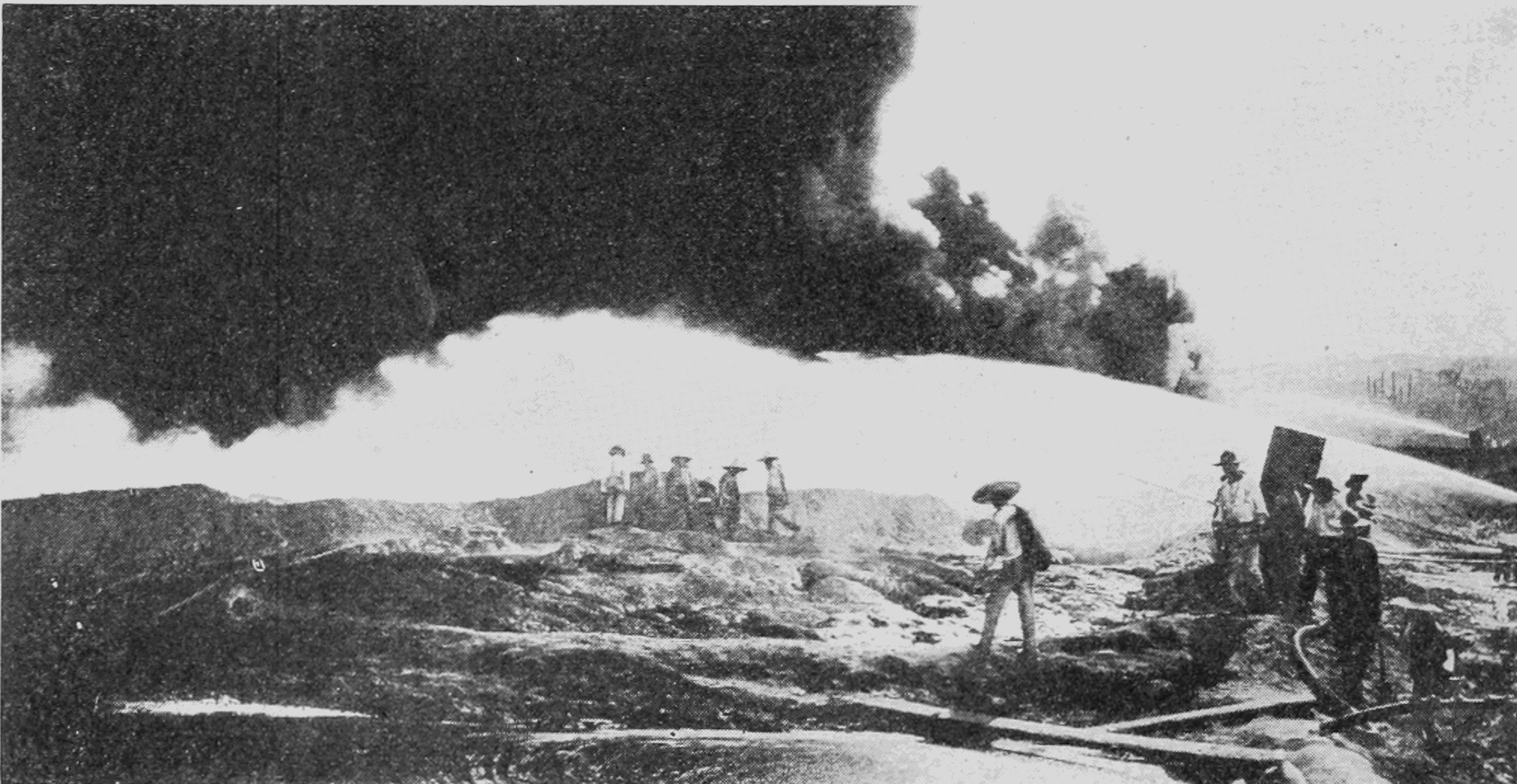
Oil workers.

Before and during the revolution one of the oil companies that contributed to US imperialism within Mexico was the Pan American Petroleum and Transport, owned by Edward Doheny. Doheny wanted to fund a study on the Mexican people that would be potentially neutral. This, however, was not the case as he was a supporter of US hegemony. Some of his values were evidenced in the treatment of the Mexican workers in his own company locations with segregation and division. The study was found to actually be designed to influence the US citizens to intercede in Mexico at the time and was not a passive look at the Mexican people. It was proven to have connections to instilling ideals of Americanization within the American people and to teach the concept of characterizing Mexicans as helpless, who would need aid in becoming like the United States.

=== Migration to the United States ===
Although not a new population to immigrate to the US as some would be led to assume, the Mexican population greatly increased within the United States when comparing the decades leading up to the Mexican Revolution and the decades afterward from 1880–1940. There was an increase from 200,000 to 600,000 Mexican immigrants during the years of 1910–1930. Many people left Mexico after the war because they wanted to avoid the calamity and devastating effects of the revolution while also seeking safety for themselves and loved ones. As the Mexican immigrant population became greater across the US borders, the focus on immigrants also became more fixed. Throughout the process, people's negative perspectives developed into a more generalized approach. It was stated in essence that immigrants from Mexico would need to catch up biologically and socially from an US individual's perspective of the "Mexican Problem."

One of the main focuses of US Border Control in the years leading up to and the start of the Mexican Revolution was controlling dealings of morality and what traffic and business they defined as immoral. Attitudes started to lean towards judging which immigrants were acceptable to be allowed into the country based on moral perspectives such as if they were involved in "sexual commerce" or if they might be a burden to the country in some form or another, relying upon federal financial reserves. This oftentimes was something that would keep people from being allowed to enter the country if they were considered a liability, and often constituted criminalization tactics which further added to the "Mexican Problem."

=== Segregation in Schools ===
During the 1920–1930's or during the time period after the Mexican Revolution there were quite a few immigrants who moved to the United States and proceeded to work in the agricultural sector. This number increased from about 121,000–368,000 in those 10 years in California. California was known for its oranges and over the course of time, as immigrants increasingly began to work more in this location, the local government became more reliant on them to harvest their produce.

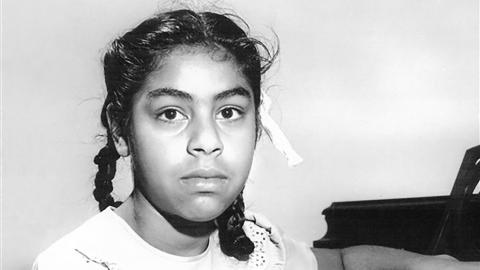
Sylvia Medez, the daughter of Gonzalo Mendez.

Orange county was an area that especially displayed segregational practices in many parts of life including and especially in locations where Mexicans and white Americans would mix within the town center interactions and business processes. Segregation was also reflected in the local schools and became more prevalent as time went on. There were eventually two schools created that were segregated: the Roosevelt school where white children attended and had more opportunities for learning, and the Lincoln school when the Mexican children attended and learned occupations uncoincidentally focused on life-skills. They were separated because of their inability to speak English and partly due to their skin color they were deemed as inferior and less able to learn. They were guided on an educational calendar that matched the agricultural flow of the crops and as the government officials had desired many did end up leaving to join their parents in the fields.

This agricultural affiliation with the school schedule was directly in conjunction with the local government's focus on segregation or thinking that the Mexican children were meant for this type of labor, just like their parents. Mexican children were believed by Californian faculty to be inferior to white children inherently because of their national origin but also intellectually in the IQ tests they had them take, which were prejudicial. The children were separated to play at different times than the white children at recess. The layout of the community was also coordinated so that Mexican families were in the center and white families around the outside. This idea of white Californians believing Mexican children to inherently fall behind the other children in intellect and capacity to learn was part of what defined the "Mexican Problem".

One of the most influential court cases that was a product of this segregated system of various Californian school districts even before Brown vs Board of Education was Mendez, et al. v. Westminster. Many Japanese were placed under incarceration camps at the time during the war, and so an opportunity opened up to accept the house leasing from the Munemitsu family for Mendez and his family. When Gonzalo Mendez attempted to enroll his children in the Seventeenth Street School they were denied because of their Spanish last name without further consideration. Although their cousins with the last name Vidaurri were accepted because their name did not sound as Mexican. This was appalling to Mendez because it violated their rights and his children even spoke English (a more common excuse for Mexican children to be separated). Eventually Gonzalo Mendez, William Guzman, Frank Palomino, Thomas Estrada, and Lorenzo Ramirez were able to sue multiple of the California districts for violating their children's rights, to which they prevailed, and the Westminster district agreed to become desegregated.

== Labor exploitation ==
There were some very racialized views that were targeted towards Mexican immigrants during the beginning to mid 1900's and one immigrant was quoted, noting how they were considered "uncivilized...'colored people.'" There is evidence to suggest they were exploited in both of the two sovereign powers and so found a real resentment towards American imperialization in Mexico and in turn did not want to become American citizens so as not to be seen betraying their Mexican identity and supporting these ideals of homogeny. There were important groups formed during this period of complex civil rights that supported the worker or communistic values to go against this idea of a class system that so many immigrants found very challenging in the United States and also in their own country.

=== Bracero Program ===
During World War II the United States had a labor program that consisted of contracted workers between the US government and Mexico to make up for the labor shortage during WWII, especially in the agricultural sector, when a majority of their work force had joined the military and were absent. This work often consisted of complicated issues, as there was wage exploitation, less than ideal living conditions and food options. Despite not have sufficient wages some would use their hard-earned funds to help their family out, which usually wasn't enough to support their own necessities.

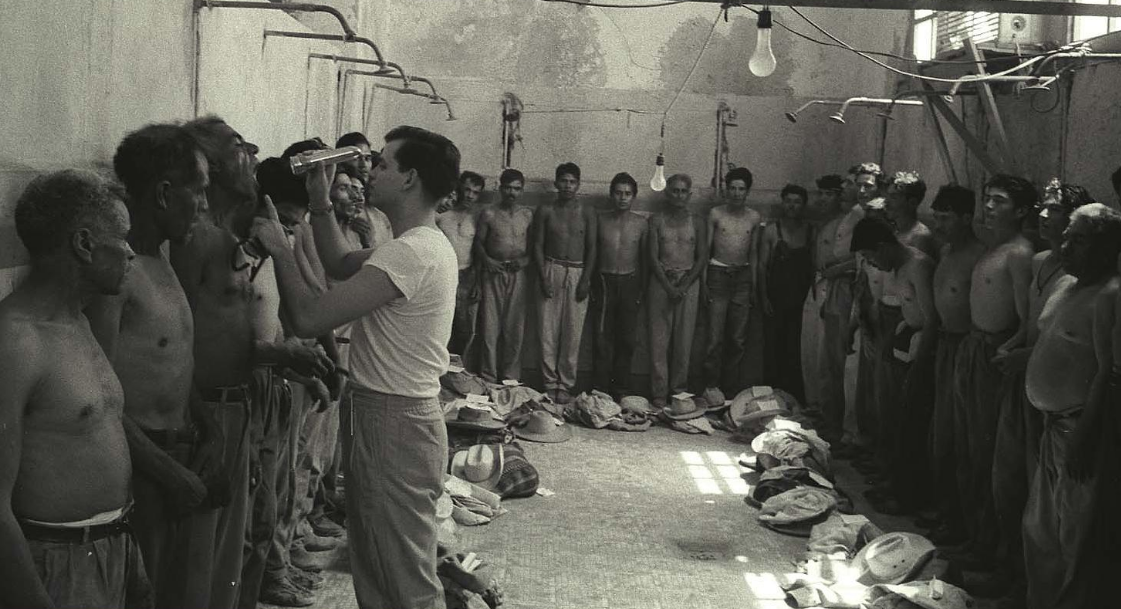
An official examines a bracero's teeth and mouth with a flashlight Monterrey Processing Center, Mexico

Despite President Roosevelt's Executive order to prohibit discrimination "because of race, creed, color, or national origin..." the work environments during the Bracero Program for many Mexican workers were inhumane and damaging to their physical health. Many were treated as less than what was promised them in their contract under the US government. They also were exposed to marginalized treatment from people that did not want them there and many Braceros were subject to racism. While the US needed substitute labor because of the low male population, the same conclusion was reached in Mexico as many men were involved in the program and so women had to join together while the men were absent.

One such example of worker exploitation was brought to light at the latter end of 1962 being recorded in a news publication. A woman named Elizabeth Longenbohn worked for the owners of a farm in El Centro of California. She claimed in a legal document that Mr. and Mrs. Englund had told her to record the hours as more than what they were actually employed for, and to alter the wage numbers as well. This could make it so that the Englund's wouldn't have to compensate the Braceros with as high of a wage in the long run. They also supported this reasoning with the claim that other farmers in the area were doing the same. Later, this case was taken to the Department of Labor in Washington D.C. and an investigation was launched towards the Englund's farm and inspections of other farms in the area.

The Braceros were placed into a system that was organized to largely benefit the business owners which on a case by case basis, whether purposefully or inadvertently subjected them to speech that dehumanized them. Although Braceros were necessary during the war to make up the labor shortage, they continued to be necessary afterwards as business owners would rely on them, and even categorize Mexican workers based on who worked most effectively. This caused Mexican laborers to be subject to a class system which labeled them as being less or more and would create a story and associated definition tied to Mexican agricultural workers.

The employer varying Braceros were often given wages under catered circumstances to that business and in one example in Oregon were given 14–16 cents per box picked. The pears had to be in good condition in order for a Bracero worker to obtain a higher wage. Despite there being exploitative practices in many areas, one of the states that actually boasted fairly just working conditions and treatment was Oregon. States such as Idaho were banned from continuing to hire Braceros because of the general rejection and largely prejudicial attitudes against Braceros. Some Oregonian citizens categorized Braceros as being agreeable for the work done in the fields and work done outside because of their perceived fitting biological traits including emphasis on darker skin and nationality. These stereotypes added to the definition of Mexican citizens being inferior which added to the prevailing biases among Americans found in the "Mexican Problem".

=== Operation Wetback "Los Mojados" ===
The United States has proven to go through eras of an increased need for immigrants and then a decreased need repeatedly depending on economic or social factors. They would often run hand in hand, but not all claims were always concretely founded, and some are riddled with bias or influenced significantly by the media. One consequential process that took place began with the "Wetbacks", (an offensive term used to describe the immigrants coming over the river to cross the border) impacted the way Mexican or Chicano citizens are viewed today. During the build up to this operation there had been an influx of more undocumented workers from Mexico even as the Bracero Program was becoming less convenient but still on the rise itself. People began coming over to work in increased numbers, which lead to more attention placed on what an undocumented worker was and how they were different from the Bracero. In 1955 an order called "Operation Wetback" was put in place to deport as many Mexican workers as possible that were not contracted. The news press at the time published many stories about a "wetback problem" as the economy was at a dipping point and there were many Mexican uncontracted laborers. There was a panic, and people began to worry about how to solucionize this issue. They did not want their jobs and admittedly there country to be taken over. Border Patrol was also worried about the press they were getting, that they were not completing their job well, so they came up with a plan to remove undocumented workers.

This was a complicated matter as the hirers of undocumented workers were largely the cause of the issue. More undocumented workers were hired and were coming over because it led to easier exploitation in work and less money spent on the part of the employers. This caused the government to want to take action. This also led the government to place more emphasis on the Bracero Program so there would be less exploitation. Both the Bracero Program and the number of undocumented workers were at their peak at this time.

The verbiage that was used at the time to describe the Mexican immigrants that were being taken and sent back to Mexico included words to evoke the feeling that these people were encroaching on American space and ultimately a threat. This caused Border Patrol to use tactics to deport immigrants that could be related to that of capturing an animal sometimes transported aggressively and taken in groups. The way in which the operation was carried out in many instances manifested the poignant attitudes that were aimed and vilified towards many migrant workers. There were 875,318 persons apprehended in 1953 and 1,075,168 apprehended in 1954 alone. This was where the switch happened and the "Mexican Problem" was less about Americanizing Mexican immigrants but rather geared towards getting them out of the country because of their association with the unknown, and fear tactics used to convince people they were a negative contribution to the country.

== Legacy of the "Mexican Problem" ==
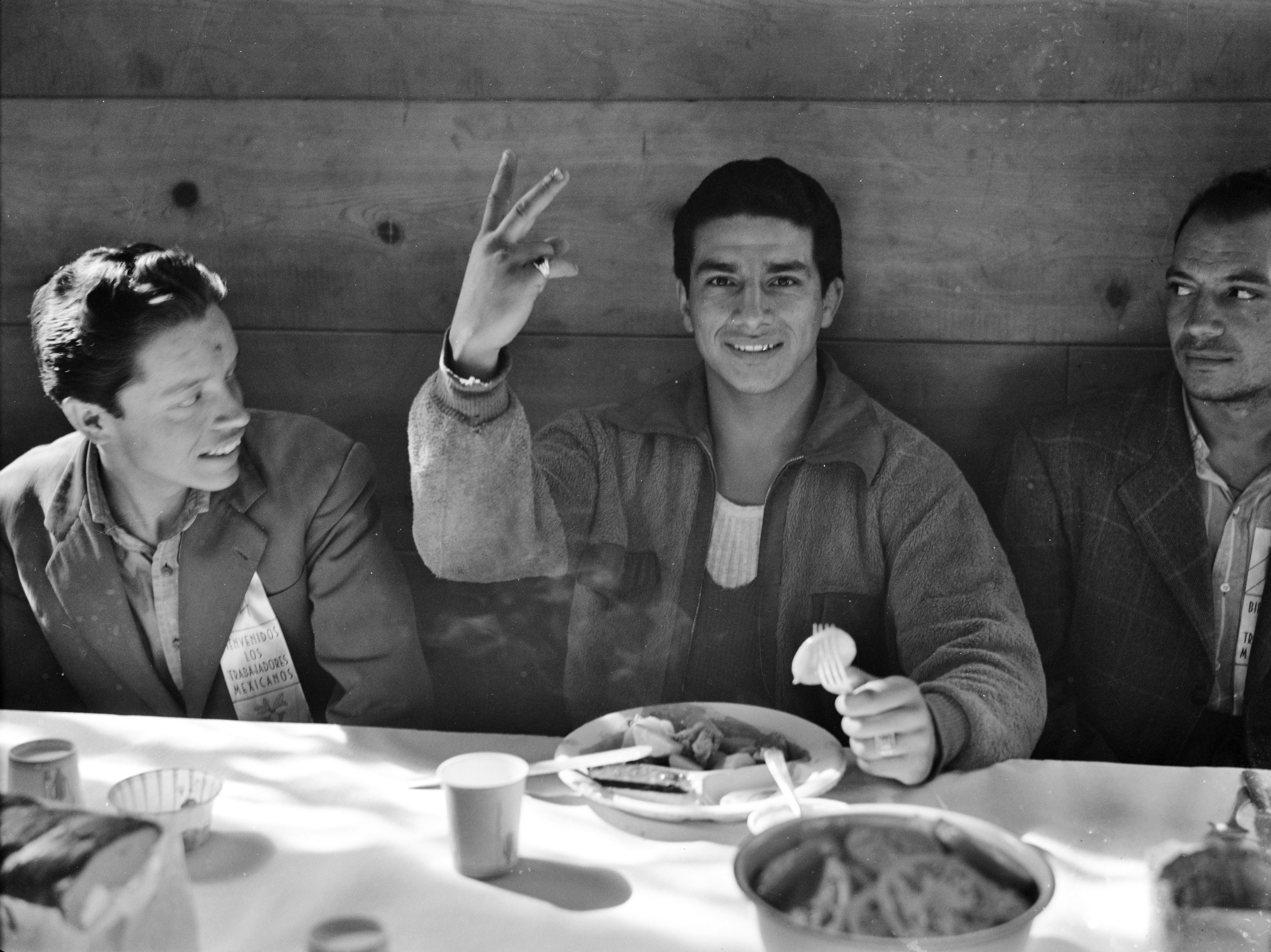
Mexican beet workers eating lunch. Stockton, California, May 1943

There is usually a pattern employed of using labels in order to categorize people, especially in a class system where there are some groups seen as lower and some groups seen as higher. Mexicans have been referred to as "Braceros", "Wetbacks" and more recently in a document written in the 1980's: "illegal alien". The document discusses how some recurring social views have been shared by large groups of the population due in part to the media that consequently places many citizens in the perspective that generally, Mexican immigrants are a social danger to the US population. They were perceived and in some opinions continue to be seen as a risk to the economy with the reasoning that they are taking valuable resources that should be used for citizens. It is also said that Mexican immigrants working in the US are taking American jobs. This interesting pattern of immigrants being desirable and then being undesirable are both fueled by the same social and economic motives that are not always the case by were held as expectations sometimes equated with fact.

Even after the Bracero Program there continued to be an increase in undocumented workers because of the economic demand of the US labor force especially in the agricultural sector. As the trend continued, so did the treatments that came when immigrant contracted workers were first introduced to the United States Labor Market in large groups during WWII. They continued to be put on uneven playing ground as social circumstances and attitudes stayed biased against them.

Eventually in the 1990's NAFTA was put into action in order to better Mexico's financial situation so as to leave less desirability for immigration. Then the Illegal Immigration Reform and Immigrant Responsibility Act (IIRIRA) was put into action seeking to tighten the border and increase funding for border patrol, trying to decrease illegal migration. However, neither was very effective in their goal to dispel Mexican immigrants as numbers continued to increase.

When Vicente Fox and George W. Bush were the presidents in office at the time in Mexico and the United States intentional action was taken to make some agreements in regard to appreciate the impact immigrants have on the US economy, the benefits of free commerce and working together financially, and helping workers that were in the US without legal status to have a means to continue to be in the US through changes to immigration. Multiple steps were going to be implemented in securing the border but also helping those already in the US to obtain easier access to resources and to what they needed.

However these decisions were interrupted on 9/11 when the twin towers were attacked, and security measures were focused towards the border. This also engendered fear once again towards immigrants and the association of foreign violence with the attacks. To remedy the situation and attempt to solucionize public relations, President Bush proposed the Fair and Secure Immigration Reform legislation which would use worker programs and create a way for undocumented to workers to continue to live in the country.

One of the greatest issues we've seen in the process of employing immigrants has been conflicting attitudes towards immigrant workers in the country and their right to be there. A couple of interesting points considered by Carey McWilliams tell us that the way immigrants have been employed has been significantly through a prejudicial lens. Immigrants are employed in mass numbers into jobs that others do not want to perform and are compensated less than what might be given an Anglo-American citizens.

Many immigrants are given living quarters that are not ideal for the regular person to sufficiently meet their needs and in the past have been segregated living separately in colonias and also in the exposure to everyday public places of commerce where they would go to buy things. Immigrants are often mass employed and because they are paid so cheaply make it difficult for local farmers to compete, which in turn has caused the responsibility for some of the effects of immigration and agriculture which has been a large source of the creation of the "Mexican Problem" to fall upon the shoulders of employers who manage the way these workers are employed.

Although the Mendez et al. v Westminster case caused big leaps and bounds for Mexican Americans in the United States at this time and moving forward, there still remains a large gap between Mexican Americans and other races in the United States today in the education department. Because their race is "stigmatized" as not being white or black and being more associated with "indigenous" origins as well as repeated tradition in the lower working sector of the job market, a good portion of this group continues to remain with less education and representation.

Today, there is an organization called the WHD or Wage and Hour Division in the US government which is meant to help immigrants legal or not to receive the compensation and benefits that they deserve ensuring that there are not exploitative work practices happening. Although this department is meant to ensure there is a check on businesses and malpractice in these organizations, many go unchecked. In addition, many are not reported especially in repeat offenders such as California where immigrants that do not have a legal immigration status are forced to stay silent about being underpaid or the mistreatment in the workplace environment. The work environment, especially in agriculture, still remains one of the biggest causes of wage and working condition exploitation in the United States.
