= Pan American Petroleum and Transport Company =

American oil company

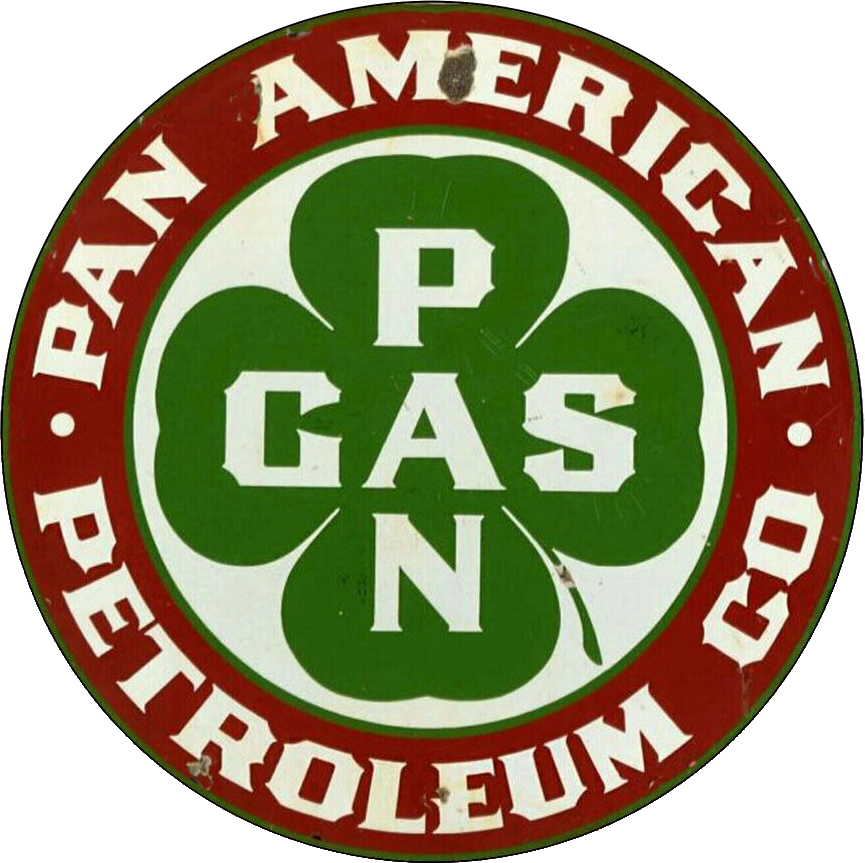
- One of the gas station logos
- Industry: Oil exploration, production and marketing
- Founded: 1916
- Founder: Edward L. Doheny
- Defunct: 1954
- Area served: United States, Mexico, Venezuela
- Products: Petroleum

The Pan American Petroleum and Transport Company (PAT) was an oil company founded in 1916 by the American oil tycoon Edward L. Doheny after he had made a huge oil strike in Mexico. Pan American profited from fuel demand during World War I, and from the subsequent growth in use of automobiles. For several years Pan American was the largest American oil company, with production assets in the United States, Mexico and Venezuela and marketing operations in the United States, Mexico, the United Kingdom and Brazil. In 1924 Pan American was involved in the Teapot Dome scandal over irregularities in the award of a U.S. government oil concession. Standard Oil of Indiana obtained a majority stake in 1925. The company sold its foreign properties to Standard Oil of New Jersey in 1932. What was left of Pan American, was merged with Standard Oil of Indiana in 1954, later renamed to Amoco after the American Oil Company, a Pan American subsidiary.

== Origins ==
Oil production in Mexico
	Barrels
<1901	0
1901	10,345
1902	40,200
1903	75,375
1904	125,625
1905	251,250
1906	502,500
1907	1,005,000
1908	3,932,900
1909	2,713,500
1910	3,634,080
1911	12,552,798
1912	16,558,215

Edward L. Doheny was a prospector who became wealthy in the 1880s from silver mines in the Black Range of New Mexico.

In 1892 he moved with his family to Los Angeles, where he sank a mine and found oil at the corner of Patton Street and West State Street. This began an oil boom in Los Angeles. Doheny overextended himself and his company went bankrupt in August 1896.

The setback was temporary, and a long-term contract with the Atchison, Topeka and Santa Fe Railway gave him the opportunity to develop and expand a growing number of oil properties.

In 1900 he visited Mexico with his associate Charles A. Canfield and Almon Porter Maginnis of the Santa Fe railroad, saw the oil potential of the country near Tampico and began acquiring property.

Doheny found heavy oil in El Ebano in 1901, which he exported to the United States for use in paving. He formed the Mexican Petroleum Company and funded it with $6 million of his own money.

In 1905 he bought properties near Tuxpan, and formed the Huasteca Petroleum Company to hold them. In 1910, his wells in the Juan Casiano Basin in the Faja de Oro field started to produce good quality oil. The Casiano No. 7 gusher spewed out 60,000 barrels a day, and by 1918 had delivered over 85 million barrels of oil. In 1911 Doheny signed a contract to supply Standard Oil. In October 1910, Doheny signed a deal with the Waters-Pierce Oil Co. (part of the Standard Oil trust) for delivery of 2,500,000 barrels of the new plentiful supply.

Doheny's Mexican Petroleum Company made a major strike in February 1916 with the Cerro Azul No. 4 in Cerro Azul. When the well struck it shot a stream of oil 598 feet (182 m) into the air. It was world's largest oil gusher, flowing 260,000 barrels per day. Over the next fourteen years the well produced over 57 million barrels. The Mexican Petroleum Company eventually acquired ownership or leasehold rights to 1,500,000 acres (610,000 ha) of land.

== Expansion ==
Oil production in
	Mexico	Venezuela
1913	25,696,291	0
1914	26,235,403	0
1915	32,910,508	0
1916	39,817,402	0
1917	55,292,770	120,000
1918	63,828,000	333,000
1919	87,073,000	425,000
1920	157,069,000	457,000
1921	193,398,000	1,433,000
1922	182,278,000	2,201,000
1923	149,585,000	4,201,000
1924	139,678,000	9,042,000
1925	115,515,000	19,687,000

The Pan American Petroleum and Transport Company was incorporated by Doheny in Delaware in 1916 as the holding company for his Mexican Petroleum Company, Huasteca Petroleum Company and California oil properties. What was initially a 51% controlling interest in Mexican Petroleum increased over time. After the minority shareholders of Mexican Petroleum were offered to exchange their shares for class B nonvoting stock of the parent company, Pan-American at the end of 1922 owned 96% of the shares of Mexican Petroleum.

World War I drove up demand for oil-fueled transport, and Doheny responded by expanding pumps, tanks and loading sites in Tampico. By July 1917 Pan American had a fleet of 31 tankers. The company paid $1.1 million in dividends in 1917 and $3.1 million in dividends on its common stock in 1918. 1918 revenues were $17 million and net profits were almost $7 million.

In 1918 the Carib Syndicate, a concern owned by Americans, bought the Barco oil concession in Colombia. They sold 75% of their interest to the Colombian Petroleum Company the next year, a subsidiary of Pan American. Doheny was also interested in plans to develop the oil industry in Venezuela, and in building a pipeline from Colombia to Venezuela to make it more economical to export the Barco oil production from the west coast of Lake Maracaibo. In 1921 Pan American was the largest oil company in the United States, ahead of Sinclair Consolidated Oil Corporation and the Standard Oil Company of Indiana. Automobile production was booming and oil prices were high. The Mexican Petroleum Company was the largest in Mexico, and Mexico was the largest oil producer in the world.

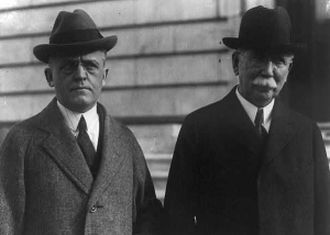
Edward L. Doheny right poses with his lawyer Frank J. Hogan in this 1924 photo

In 1922 Albert B. Fall, U.S. Secretary of the Interior, leased the oil field at Elk Hills, California, to the Pan American Petroleum & Transport Company. Around the same time, the Teapot Dome Field in Wyoming was leased to Sinclair Consolidated Oil Corporation. Both oilfields were part of the US Navy's petroleum reserves. Neither lease was subject to competitive bidding. In 1924 rumors about corruption in the deals escalated into the Teapot Dome scandal.

On 24 January 1924 Doheny testified before the U.S. Senate Committee on Public Lands and Surveys, and admitted that he had loaned Fall $100,000 in cash with no security some months before the oilfield leasing arrangement was made. Doheny said the loan was a personal one. Pan American had been the lowest bidder for a contract to build and fill crude oil storage facilities at Pearl Harbor, and had offered to undertake this contract in exchange for the oilfield lease, being paid in oil and then paying royalties to the government for oil extracted in excess of costs. Eventually the Supreme Court nullified both leases. It was not until 1930 that Doheny was cleared of all charges.

In 1923 Louis Blaustein and his son Jacob Blaustein sold a half interest in their American Oil Company to Pan American in exchange for a guaranteed supply of oil. Before this deal, American Oil had depended on Standard Oil of New Jersey, a competitor, for its supplies. At the end of 1923 Pan American had a net worth of $173 million, with net earnings that year of over $20 million. The company paid dividends of $20.4 million that year.

== Standard Oil of Indiana subsidiary ==
Oil production in
	Mexico	Venezuela
1926	90,421,000	36,911,000
1927	64,121,000	63,134,000
1928	50,151,000	105,749,000
1929	44,688,000	137,472,000
1930	39,530,000	136,669,000
1931	33,039,000	116,613,000
1932	32,805,000	116,541,000

On 1 April 1925, the California assets of Pan American Petroleum and Transport were transferred to a new holding company, the Pan American Western Petroleum Company, in which Doheny retained control. He sold a majority of shares in the remainder of the Venezuelan facilities of the Pan American Petroleum and Transport Company and his Mexican Petroleum Company to Pan American Eastern Petroleum, a new subsidiary of Standard Oil of Indiana. This included the Mexican holdings, Atlantic and Gulf Coasts holdings in the United States, refineries, pipelines and 31 tankers. Standard of Indiana increased its stake over time and by 1931 owned 95% of both classes (voting and non-voting) of common stock of PAT.

At the end of 1925 Pan American Western gained control of Lago Petroleum Corporation from C. Ledyard Blair's Blair & Co.. The transaction was to be the subject of a stockholder action in 1933, alleging that there had been a conspiracy by the bankers, who were represented on the Pan American board, to make excessive profits. In 1926 Venezuelan Eastern Petroleum Corporation was organized as a subsidiary of Pan American Eastern with the purpose of buying and developing Venezuelan oil properties.

On March 14, 1925 the Turkish Petroleum Company was granted a concession in Iraq, in which no petroleum industry existed at the time. 25% of the stock belonged to an American group of 6 oil companies, among them the Mexican Petroleum Company. In 1926 Pan American Petroleum & Transport replaced Mexican Petroleum. The famous Kirkuk field was discovered in 1927, but in 1931 Pan American sold its 16 2/3% interest in the American group to the Standard Oil of New Jersey which increased Jersey's share to 41 2/3%, before any commercial production in the concession got underway. In other words, a prelude to the 1932 sale of Pan American's foreign properties to Standard of NJ. The Kirkuk-Haifa oil pipeline was completed in 1934 to an initial capacity of 85,000bpd and remained so until 1948. PAT's share of 16.6% of 23.75% would have provided the company with 3,350bpd at an Eastern Mediterranean port, far away from any existing company-owned refinery capacity and would have made it a minor part of a company that was in the initial stages of an effort to control almost the whole Middle East through its various affiliates.

In June 1930, PanAm bought for ca. $5 million the assets of the Tide Water Oil Export Corp., subsidiary of Tidewater Oil and a distributor of refined products primarily in Brazil and Argentina.

In 1932 Standard Oil of New Jersey offered $50 million in cash and $98 million in Jersey shares for all foreign assets of Pan American Petroleum as part of a deal arranged with Standard of Indiana which then sold its entire stake of 96% in these subsidiary assets. With this acquisition, Standard Oil of New Jersey became Mexico's largest oil producer. The deal also included large oil concessions in Venezuela and Pan-American's UK subsidiary Cleveland Petroleum Products.

However, a few years later the Mexican properties were nationalized. President Lázaro Cárdenas expropriated all foreign oil concessions on 18 March 1938 and placed them under the government-controlled Pemex, paying compensation to the former owners.

In the 1940s, the case of Blaustein v. Pan American Petroleum & Oil Transport Co. was heard by the Supreme Court to determine whether the directors of Pan American had been in breach of their fiduciary duty. The directors were all officers of directors of Standard Oil of Indiana, which held almost 80% of Pan American's shares, and it was charged that they had deprived Pan American of profitable opportunities to drill and refine oil. The majority finding, setting an important precedent, was that it should be assumed that they had acted in good faith and without personal gains to themselves.

Effective August 17, 1954, Pan American merged with Standard of Indiana, the latter's board of directors increased by one seat to 16, to which Jacob Blaustein was appointed. At the time of the merger 78% of the stock of Pan American was owned by Standard Oil of Indiana. Substantially all of the assets were transferred to the American Oil Company (the former PanAm subsidiary, and now a directly and wholly owned subsidiary of Standard OIl of Indiana). Most important minority shareholders in the late PanAm corporation were the Blausteins, who received 0.777 Indiana shares for each of their PanAm shares (which amounted to ca. 22% of 4,702,945 common stock, the only class of stock outstanding for PanAm). The plan was to issue 777,716 new Indiana shares on top of the then current number of 15,386,519 (+5.1%). The Blaustein interests thus became one of the big shareholders of Standard.

To form the American Oil Company, Amoco. Amoco was in turn acquired by BP in 1998.

== Production ==
Map of Mexican leases and pipelines belonging to Pam American subsidiaries:

=== Ebano ===
The company's first operation at Ebano was characterized by the Oil Investors' Journal as being very guarded and secretive in a 1907 report. The company's stock was not offered to the general public. The company owned a contiguous 1 million acres and was headquartered at the town of Ebano. It was believed to have drilled constantly for some years, but kept the wells shut in except for some two or three, until an outlet could be found. The heavy oil produced was especially adapted to be used as fuel oil, and the company supplied some 4,000bpd of unrefined crude oil to the Mexican railroads for use on their locomotives. There was a refinery in operation at Ebano, which produced asphalt that paved roads inside Mexico, for example in Guadalajara and Mexico City.

=== Casiano ===
A 70 mile pipeline was laid, to some degree in anticipation, before the big gushers in the field were struck (Casiano No. 6 on July 10, 1910; Casiano No. 7 on September 11, 1910 - with a combined capacity of 70,000bpd which could be pinched off to 25,000bpd but no less if escape of oil into the countryside was to be prevented). The pipeline running up to Tampico was completed September 17, 1910 (capable of delivering 25,000bpd which was initially soaked up by Waters-Pierce), but a stretch had been used since April 1910 to transport oil to river barges. Storage tanks were quickly built, by 1914 over 8 million barrels of steel storage tanks and 2 million barrels of concrete reservoirs were completed. Contracts amounting to 30,000bpd were closed with Mexico and foreign clients. All requirements could be met from No. 7 well alone and producing wells at Cerro Azul, and Casiano No. 6 was shut in. Casiano No. 7 was flowing at a customary rate of about 21,500bpd and by June 1914 had produced a total of 31 million barrels. By June 1914 there were now 3 parallel 8-inch pipelines between the field and Tampico and together with oil arriving from Cerro Azul in the south, the total amount sent downstream to Tampico was 70,000bpd. There was a port and tank farm at San Geronimo (21.52397°N 97.6111°W) and a 35 mile railway line from the port passing through Casiano and terminating at Cerro Azul. The pipeline was parallel to the railway to the port and then followed the coast line northwards towards Tampico. The pipeline system in March 1915 included two parallel 22 mile 8-inch lines to Cerro Azul and also a lateral 18 mile line to Tres Hermanos.

=== Smackover ===
On January 3, 1923 PAT acquired 5 parcels including the 20,000bpd Clark-Mallat well in the light oil section of the Smackover field in Arkansas, bringing the total to 750 acres, all in the light oil section. Smackover was discovered in 1922 and caused a small oil boom in the area.

=== In General ===
In August 1925, shortly after the Indiana takeover, PAT was working under a policy of conservation of Mexican resources, concentrating more on production inside the United States. PAT was running 30,000bpd out of Smackover to the Destrehan refinery, 80,000 through the Tampico refinery and 30,000 through California refineries.

== Refining ==
In August 1917 the Destrehan refinery was completed to a capacity of 10,000bpd but at the time of opening expected to reach 20,000bpd within 4 months. At the time of the April 1925 merger it stood at 30,000bpd.

== Shipping ==
The first shipment from Mexico was carried on the tanker Snowflake, chartered in October 1911.

Tankers owned
Name	Tonnage	Builder	Launched	Commissioned	Ref
Herbert G. Wylie	6,620	(United Kingdom) Armstrong, Whitworth & Co		1912	
Edward L. Doheny	9,970	(United Kingdom)		1913	
Norman Bridge	6,885	(United Kingdom)		1913	
J. Oswald Boyd	2,770	(United Kingdom)		1913	
Charles E. Harwood	5,100	(United Kingdom)		1913	
C. A. Canfield	9,850	(United Kingdom) Armstrong, Whitworth & Co	11 March 1913	26 April 1913	
George E. Paddleford	7,500	(United States) Harlan & Hollingsworth	18 April 1916	12 July 1916	
J. M. Danziger	10,000	(United States) Wm. Cramp & Sons	28 June 1916	17 August 1916	
George G. Henry	10,475	(United States) Union Iron Works	9 April 1917	7 June 1917	
Harold Walker	10,000	Wm. Cramp & Sons	3 May 1917	9 June 1917	
E. L. Doheny Jr.	12,350	(United States) New York Shipbuilding	24 April 1917	18 June 1917	
William Green	10,000	Wm. Cramp & Sons	16 June 1917	14 July 1917	
Frederic R. Kellog	10,000	(United States) Moore & Scott Iron Works	19 May 1917	8 August 1917	
Frederic Ewing (Note: Launched for the USSB as Wilhelm Jebsen)	10,350	Union Iron Works	21 July 1917		
S. M. Spalding	10,475	Union Iron Works	17 December 1917	7 March 1918	
Paul H. Harwood	10,475	Union Iron Works	10 February 1918		
George W. Barnes	9,100	(United States) Fore River	16 May 1918	9 June 1918	
W. L. Steed	9,100	Fore River	2 September 1918	1918	
E. L. Doheny III.	12,775	New York Shipbuilding	17 August 1918	1918	
Dean Emery (Note: Launched as Sun Shine)	10,600	(United States) Sun Shipbuilding	4 October 1919	1919	
I. C. White	10,600	Sun Shipbuilding	14 July 1920	1920	
Elisha Walker	10,600	Sun Shipbuilding	25 August 1920	1920	
William H. Doheny	10,206	Union Iron Works	20 August 1920	1920	
Franklin K. Lane	10,206	Union Iron Works	31 August 1920	1920	
Crampton Anderson	10,206	Union Iron Works (Alameda)	30 November 1920	1921	
Cerro Ebano	12,940	Sun Shipbuilding	19 February 1921	1921	
Cerro Azul	12,940	Sun Shipbuilding	26 February 1921	1921	
Gulf of Mexico barges
Mexoil	2,400	(United States)	14 February 1918		
Panoil	2,400	(United States)	8 June 1918		
Fueloil	2,400	(United States)			
Crudoil	2,400	(United States)			

Tankers: names, owners, fates (Note: Data from Lloyd's Register)
Name	Owner	Fate
until 1932 owned by: Pan American Petroleum & Transport Pan American Foreign Corp^{1932} (Note: except George E. Paddleford)
Herbert G. Wylie	Standard Oil of Venezuela^{1934}	sunk after explosion January 12, 1939 in Caripito, Venezuela
Edward L. Doheny	Standard NJ^{1935} War Shipping Admin.^{1944}	
Norman Bridge; Esso Caracas^{1939}	Standard NJ^{1935} Lago Petroleum^{1939}	
Charles E. Harwood		broken up 1934
C. A. Canfield	Standard NJ^{1935} War Shipping Admin^{1943}	
George E. Paddleford; Oscar D. Bennet^{1921} Henry M. Dawes^{1932}	Sabine Transportation Co.^{1932}	
J. M. Danziger	Sabine Towing Co.^{1935}	
Harold Walker; W. C. Fairbanks^{1935}	Pure Oil Co.^{1935}	
William Green	Sabine Transportation Co.^{1935}	
Frederic R. Kellogg	Standard NJ^{1935} War Shipping Admin^{1944}	
S. M. Spalding	Standard NJ^{1935}	broken up 1938
Paul H. Harwood	Standard NJ^{1935}	
George W. Barnes	Standard NJ^{1935} War Shipping Admin^{1944}	
E. L. Doheny III; F. H. Wickett; E. G. Seubert^{1932}	Standard NJ^{1935}	torpedoed February 22, 1944
W. L. Steed	Standard NJ^{1935}	torpedoed February 2, 1942 off the coast of New Jersey.
William H. Doheny; E. J. Bullock^{1930}	Standard NJ^{1935}	exploded October 6, 1938 in the Caribbean
Franklin K. Lane	Standard NJ^{1935}	torpedoed June 9, 1942
Cerro Ebano; Esso Dover^{1940}	Standard NJ^{1935}	
Cerro Azul; Esso Providence^{1940}	Standard NJ^{1935}	
Crampton Anderson; Allan Jackson^{1931}	Standard NJ^{1935}	torpedoed January 18, 1942
Dean Emery	Standard NJ^{1935} Panama Transport Co.^{1939}	
I. C. White	Standard NJ^{1935} Panama Transport Co.^{1939}	
Elisha Walker	Standard NJ^{1935} Panama Transport Co.^{1939}	
Wilhelm Jebsen; Frederic Ewing^{1920} C. J. Barkdull^{1931}	Standard NJ^{1935} Panama Transport Co.^{1939}	torpedoed January 10, 1942
George G. Henry; USS Victoria (AO-46)^{1942}	Standard NJ^{1935} Panama Transport Co.^{1940}	

House flag used by Pan-Ame tankers

Tankers chartered
Name	Tonnage	Timeframe
Snowflake (Note: Handled first overseas shipment from Mexico for the company)	1,726	October 1911 for 1 year
Russian Prince	5,800	April 1912 for 2 years
Mantilla	8,400	ca. 1922
Meline	10,360	ca. 1922
Mendocino	10,360	ca. 1922
Mirlo	10,100	ca. 1922
Montana	10.360	ca. 1922
Nora	14,308	ca. 1922

- Steel tug Oscar D. Bennett: wrecked January 1920
- Steel tug Mexpet (1915)
- Wooden tug Pan-Am (1925; A.C. Brown S.B. Co. Tottenville, NY)

=== British-Mexican Petroleum Company ===
The company was formed in April 1915 as a 50-50 joint venture between the Mexican Petroleum Company (Delaware) and a group of business interests representing manufacturing plants, railways, a marine internal combustion engine maker and shipping lines all eager to switch from coal to oil. World War I prevented progress and on July 15, 1919 a new company was incorporated under the same name, 50% of the £2m common stock owned by Mexican Petroleum. A contract was signed for delivery of 1,000,000 tons (ca. 7,500,000 barrels) or more annually of Mexican oil projected to last for 20 years. The British counterparty now included Lord Pirrie and William Weir. The British 50% of the stock was held by the British Union Oil Co., behind which stood the White Star Line, Cunard Steamship Company and the Royal Mail and others and so the principle business consisted of the trade of fuel oil for ships.

When PAT lost a contract to supply the Cunard Steamship Company with fuel oil in British ports, it sold all of its holdings in British-Mexican Petroleum in the beginning of 1924 at a substantial loss. In April 1924 British-Mexican acquired a large position in the Lago Petroleum Corporation (presumably to make up for the loss of their Mexican supply). It bought 400,000 shares of Lago Petroleum to inject cash into the operation and the Lago Oil and Transport Company was established on May 27, 1924 in which British-Mexican held the entire $2.5m of preferred stock and 51% of the common stock leaving 49% to Lago Petroleum. In the April 1925 Indiana takeover (in which the British interests were again involved) PAT was again united with British-Mexican when it acquired 100% of the stock and the British interests financially participated in the syndicate that acquired a controlling interest in PAT. Then in August 1925 PAT sold (finally) all outstanding stock to the Anglo-American Oil Company, excluding the following American properties in which British-Mexican had some partial holdings in and which were transferred to PAT:

- Southern Crude Oil Purchasing Co
- Southern Pipe Line Co (Smackover properties)
- Lago Petroleum Co
- Lago Oil & Transport Co

Anglo-American Oil had been segregated from Standard Oil in 1911 and in 1925 was marketing most of the oil of the Standard Oil of New Jersey in the United Kingdom. In other words, the sale of British-Mexican was a prelude to the 1932 sale of PAT's foreign properties to Standard Oil of NJ in that it was (1) the sale of a foreign investment, (2) connected to Standard Oil and (3) the loss of a foreign outlet for oil, the lack of which became the primary reason for the later sale of the foreign production assets.

See also this summary: History in short

Tankers owned by the British-Mexican Petroleum Co.
Name	Tonnage	Launched
Inveritchen		13 July 1920
Inverarder	8,685	
Inverleith	10,300	26 August 1920
Inverampton		9 September 1920
Inverurie	10,300	9 June 1921
Invergoil		21 September 1922
Inveravon		18 January 1923
Invergordon		20 January 1923
Invergarry		15 November 1923
Inverglass		30 September 1924
Redline No. 1		13 October 1924
Inverpool		6 April 1925

Tankers: names, owners, fates
Name	Owner	Fate
Inverampton
War Hagara; Inverarder		torpedoed February 24, 1942 (Atlantic Convoy ON 67)
Inveravon
Invergarry; Mount Dirfys^{1937} Stad Maastricht^{1939}	Kulukundis Shipping Co^{1937} Halcyon-Lijn N.V.^{1939}	torpedoed September 23, 1940
Inverglass
Invergordon; Mount Helmos^{1937}	Kulukundis Shipping Co^{1937}	
Inveritchen	Anglo-American Oil^{1938}	
Inverleith; Sunstone^{1938} Castelverde^{1939}		
Inverpool	Anglo-American Oil^{1938}	
Inverurie
Invergoil
Invertest
Invertyne

Tankers chartered by British-Mexican from Andrew Weir & Co
Name	Tonnage
Caloric	10,270
Gymeric	9,500
Oyleric	9,530
Wyneric	6,930

== Distribution ==
The company since its early days was supplying the Mexican railroads with fuel. Some 4000bpd in 1907 and 10,000bpd in 1913.

The Mexican Petroleum Corporation, incorporated May 17, 1915 to manage the retail business of the Mexican Petroleum Co. Ltd. (Delaware) owned the refineries, storage tanks and distribution stations in the United States.

Bulk distribution facilities
City	Dist (Note: Sea route distance from Tampico in nautical miles (832nm to Straits of Florida junction))	Acres	Commissioned
United States
Destrehan		1,012	August 1917
Tampa	921	17.5	
Jacksonville	1,361	15	
Carteret (Note: 40.59218°N 74.21255°W)	2,029	334	
Providence		62	first shipment July 29, 1917 (Note: E.L. Doheny sailed from Tampico on 19 July)
Boston	2,272	23	
Portland		27	
Passaic
Norfolk	1,829		
Galveston	473		
Fall River
Los Angeles
New Orleans	711		
Franklin
Curtis Bay	1,947		via American Oil 1923 (50%)
South America
Cristobal	1,528		
Montevideo
Buenos Aires
Para
Pernambuco
Bahia
Rio de Janeiro
Santos
United Kingdom
Avonmouth
Ellesmere Port
Glasgow
Liverpool
Southampton
South Shields
Thameshaven

Up until 1924, Pan-American only sold crude naphta and gasoline wholesale to Standard Oil companies (200 million gallons in 1923) but then in 1924 began operating its own filling stations. At the time of the Indiana merger in April 1925 there were 68 stations in Maine, New Hampshire, Vermont, Massachusetts, Rhode Island, Connecticut, New York, New Jersey, Delaware, Maryland, Washington D.C., Virginia, West Virginia, North Carolina, South Carolina, Mississippi, Georgia, Florida, Louisiana, Alabama and Tennessee. A portion of that network came from the 50% share taken in American Oil Co. in November 1923, American Oil, concentrated in the state of Maryland, became sole distributor for Pan American products in a number of eastern states.

== Organization and Finance ==
=== Subsidiaries ===
Main reference for the list below (in parentheses are state where incorporated, date of incorporation and authorized capital as of 1927)

Mexican Petroleum Co. of California (California, 20 December 1900, $10,000,000) - produces, refines and markets oil

Tuxpam Petroleum Co. (Maine, 26 June 1906, $1,000,000) - owns Mexican oil lands

Tamiahua Petroleum Co. (Maine, 3 October 1906, $1,000,000) - owns Mexican oil lands

Huasteca Petroleum Co (Maine, 12 February 1907, $15,000,000) - produces, refines and markets oil

Mexican Petroleum Co, Ltd (Delaware 17 February 1907, $60,000,000) - a holding company

Caloric Company (New York, 4 October 1911, $2,000,000) - operates marketing stations in Brazil

Mexican Petroleum Corp (Maine, 17 May 1915, $10,000,000) - markets oil in Gulf and Atlantic coast stations

Mexican Petroleum Corp of Louisiana (Louisiana, 8 February 1918, $1,594,600) - refines and markets oil

Pan American Petroleum Corp (Delaware, 5 November 1923, $100,000) - operates bulk and service stations in Georgia, Alabama, Mississippi, Florida, Louisiana

Southern Pipe Line Co. (Delaware, 27 June 1924, $200,000) - company owns $100,000 of the capital stock

Southern Crude Oil Purchasing Co. (Delaware, 29 August 1924, $200,000)

Lago Oil & Transport Co. (Delaware, 10 November 1925, 5,500,000 shares no par) - produces and markets petroleum

Pan American Petroleum Corp of Tennessee (Delaware, 19 March 1926, $2,000,000) - operates bulk and service stations in Tennessee

=== Transactions ===
Pan American Eastern Petroleum Corp: was incorporated on March 26, 1925 in Delaware with an authorized capital of 250,000 par $100 preferred and 1,000,000 no-par common stock by a syndicate of (1) Blair & Co (Chase banking group), (2) Lord Inverforth (managing director of British-Mexican Petroleum with connections in British oil and shipping industries) and (3) Standard Oil of Indiana. Acquired 501,000 out of 1,001,556 of the class A voting shares of PAT from the Petroleum Securities Co. (representing E. L. Doheny and family holdings, who retained substantial interest in PAT and became second largest shareholder behind Pan American Eastern). At the same time, PAT acquired the stock of the British-Mexican Petroleum Co., Ltd. The transaction did not involve the exchange of stock of the Pan American Eastern to Doheny. A plan was announced to split California properties into the Pan American Western Petroleum Corp. to be implemented in the near future. There was no overlap between Standard Oil of Indiana and Pan American distribution inside the United States. Standard Oil of Indiana subsequently increased its position in Pan American Eastern. On September 9, 1927 Indiana authorized stock was increased from $250m to $375m. There were also issued 37,500 shares ($25 par) to buy at a ratio of 4 to 1 one batch of 150,000 shares of PAEastern. Standard of Indiana then also undertook to acquire minority stock of the underlying Pan American Petroleum & Transport Co. After an offer for the exchange of 7 Indiana shares for each 6 shares of PAT stock ended on November 30, 1929, Indiana was in possession of ca. 70% of the 3,442,608 A and B shares of PAT. Since around the same time, PAT was in the process of exchanging 1 share of its own stock for each 2 shares of Lago Oil & Transport, Indiana's offer was renewed a few more times to absorb these new PAT shares: Indiana held 83% (93% class A and 79% class B) prior to the renewal lasting from July 1 to August 15, 1930 and held 92% when it announced to continue the exchange at the same 7:6 rate between October 1 and November 15, 1930.

Pan American Western Petroleum Co.: Incorporated in Delaware on May 7, 1925, acquired from PAT 100% of the stock of the Pan American Petroleum Co. (Calif.) for $23,293,125, $11,250,000 were in the form of 15-year notes and the rest in cash raised from the sale of 500,000 Pan American Western shares, 100,000 class A voting shares acquired at $23.50 by the Petroleum Securities Co. (Doheny family) and 400,000 class B nonvoting shares at $23.50 sold principally to existing PAT shareholders who were offered the right to subscribe to a share for each 7 shares of PAT they held and with Petroleum Securities obtaining all those class B shares that could not be sold otherwise. The California company continued as the operating subsidiary of Pan American Western. The Richfield Oil Corporation acquired all outstanding class A and a substantial block of class B shares from Doheny's Petroleum Securities Co. in a June 20, 1928 deal in which Richfield also announced the intention to buy the balance of shares in the future in exchange for Richfield stock. Also purchased were all of the physical assets of Pacific Petroleum Products Co. The result was a withdrawal of Doheny interests from all refining and marketing on the West Coast. Petroleum Securities Co. entered into a 10-year contract to sell their entire 20,000bpd crude production to Richfield (who produced 40,000bpd). Richfield on Nov 11, 1928 extended the offer to buy PAWestern B shares indefinitely. The Pacific Western Oil Corporation at the end of 1928 then acquired essentially all the oil producing properties of Petroleum Securities Company.

Pan American Foreign Corp. (Delaware): was incorporated on March 9, 1932 with an authorized capital of 1,100,000 class A and 3,000,000 class B. PAT received in exchange for its foreign assets all newly created outstanding shares of ForeignCorp, the number of shares exactly equal to the number of shares of the parent company. The shares were distributed to PAT shareholders one ForeignCorp share for each PAT share. Standard Oil of Indiana held 96% of the common stock of PAT and so received 96% of the stock of ForeignCorp, which it agreed to sell in bulk to Standard Oil of New Jersey. Jersey offered $50m in cash and an estimated $96m in stock for 100% of ForeignCorp shares, based on the book value of the ForeignCorp assets on April 30, 1932 and the book value of Jersey shares on December 31, 1931. Standard of Indiana's 96%, or 971,897 "A" and 2,301,400 "B" ForeignCorp shares, amounted to $47,910,106 in cash and 1,778,973 Jersey shares, both of which were paid in 5 annual installments, the last due May 5, 1936. Jersey bought its own shares for the first 4 installments on the open market and issued new shares for the last installment. The Pan American Foreign Corp. was dissolved at the end of 1936 to avoid double taxation under the Revenue Act of 1936. Lloyd's register listed Pan American Foreign Corp. as owners of the transferred tankers in 1932 and Standard of New Jersey as owners in 1935.

== Documentation ==
Annual Reports
191x			3	4	5	6	7
192x	0	2			5	6	

== In popular culture ==
The novel Oil! by Upton Sinclair published in 1927 is loosely based on Doheney's life and the story of Pan American. Oil! was in turn the inspiration for the 2007 film There Will Be Blood.

A photo by Walker Evans in Let Us Now Praise Famous Men of a post office in Sprott, AL shows a Pan-Am pump.

== The Mexican Petroleum Industry ==
1915 AIME map:

Detail map of Tepetate, Juan Casiano, Chinampa, Naranjos (1920):

Summary of Drilling and Production of the Ebano-Panuco Oil Fields (Note: as of December 31, 1947)
Field	Disc Year	Wells Drilled		x 1000 barrels		
Field	Disc Year	Dry	Producers	Capacity	Produced	Proven Reserve
Ebano-Chapacao	1901	400	248	139,097	139,128	2,969
Altamira	1907	158	20	6,676	4,552	2,124
Topila	1908	164	153	32,152	31,619	535
Corcovado	1909	211	86	20,523	19,664	859
Panuco	1910	735	564	344,668	319,495	25,173
El Barco-Caracol	1911	123	104	12,527	11,216	1,311
Cacalilao	1922	867	444	276,940	264,784	12,156
Limon	1922	54	45	7,085	6,178	907
Other Fields		55				
Total		2,765	1,664	839,660	793,636	46,032

Summary of Drilling and Production of the Golden Lane Fields
Field	Disc Year	Wells Drilled		x 1000 barrels		
Field	Disc Year	Dry	Producers	Capacity	Produced	Proven Reserve
San Diego-Chiconcillo	1907	67	21	10,310	9,401	909
Tepetate-N-Chinampa	1909	30	38	147,559	144,619	2,940
Potrero-Horcones	1910	7	15	107,967	107,191	776
Tierra-Amarilla	1911	10	13	1,319	1,258	61
Alazan	1912	18	7	11,140	9,033	2,107
S-Chinampa-N-Amatlan	1913	28	75	210,051	206,687	3,364
Toteco-Cerro Azul	1913	71	74	317,585	310,265	7,320
Alamo-San Isidro (Note: San Isidro was located southeast of Alamo-Jardin leases)	1913	83	85	64,942	63,656	1,286
S-Amatlan	1920	88	98	108,360	104,077	4,283
Zacamixtle	1920	20	30	15,638	14,933	645
Cerro Viejo	1921	27	23	18,735	18,579	156
Tierra Blanca-Chapopote	1921	40	59	91,311	88,701	2,610
Juan Felipe-Moralillo	1922	6	7	2,339	2,209	130
Total		503	545	1,107,256	1,080,669	26,587

Pipeline capacity (Dec 1920) (Apr 1923)
	Bpd Total 12/1920	L	D	Bpd	From	To	Pumps	Since
Northern Fields to Coast
La Corona Oil Co	30,000							
East Coast Oil Co	20,000							
Mexican Petr. Co	4,000							
Total	54,000							
Southern Fields to Coast
Huasteca Petr. Co	115,000	81	8 (Note: The source says 10 inch which is presumed to be an error)		Cerro Azul	Tampico	Cerro Azul; Casiano; San Geronimo; La Laja; Horcanitas; Garrapatas	
Huasteca Petr. Co	115,000	81	8		Cerro Azul	Tampico	Cerro Azul; Casiano; San Geronimo; La Laja; Horcanitas; Garrapatas	
Huasteca Petr. Co	115,000	81	8		Cerro Azul	Tampico	Cerro Azul; Casiano; San Geronimo; La Laja; Horcanitas; Garrapatas	1 Oct 1920
Huasteca Petr. Co	115,000	65	8		Casiano	Tampico	Cerro Azul; Casiano; San Geronimo; La Laja; Horcanitas; Garrapatas	
Huasteca Petr. Co	115,000	2.5	8		Tankville	Tampico		
Mexican Eagle Oil	100,000	70	8		Los Naranjos	Tampico	Los Naranjos; San Gregorio; San Luciano; Buston; Santo Tomas; Chijol; San Diego	
Mexican Eagle Oil	100,000	70	8		Los Naranjos	Tampico	Los Naranjos; San Gregorio; San Luciano; Buston; Santo Tomas; Chijol; San Diego	
Mexican Eagle Oil	100,000	30	8		Potrero	Tuxpan	Potrero	1911
Mexican Eagle Oil	100,000	30	8		Potrero	Tuxpan	Potrero	
Mexican Eagle Oil	100,000	20	8		Los Naranjos	Potrero	Los Naranjos	1919
Mexican Eagle Oil	100,000	20	8		Los Naranjos	Potrero	Los Naranjos	early 1920
Mexican Eagle Oil	100,000		8		Zacamixtle	Los Naranjos		5 Dec 1920
Mexican Eagle Oil	100,000		6		Potrero	Tanhujo		(old)
Mexican Eagle Oil	100,000		6		Potrero	Tanhujo		(old)
Mexican Eagle Oil	100,000	54	6		Furbero	Tuxpan	Furbero; El Calichal; Cazones; Tuxpan	1910
Transcontinental Petr. Co	84,000	20	8		Chinampa	Mata Redonda		
Transcontinental Petr. Co	84,000	20	8		Chinampa	Mata Redonda		
Transcontinental Petr. Co	84,000	20	8		Chinampa	Mata Redonda		
Transcontinental Petr. Co	84,000	20	8		Chinampa	Mata Redonda		24 Nov 1920
Cortez Oil Corp	58,000	22	10	30,000	Tepetate	Port Lobos	Tepetate (Note: Passes through Saladero)	Aug 1918
Cortez Oil Corp	58,000		10	21,000	Saladero (Note: Loop of existing line)	Port Lobos		
Cortez Oil Corp	58,000	22	6	7,000	Tepetate	Port Lobos	Tepetate	
Mexican Gulf Oil Co	50,500	62	8	15,600	Tepetate	Tampico	Tepetate; Horcanitas; Tampico	5 May 1918
Mexican Gulf Oil Co	50,500	62	10	35,000	Tepetate	Tampico	Tepetate; Horcanitas; Tampico	fall 1920
Island Oil & Transport Co	50,000		8		Tepetate	Port Lobos		1918
Island Oil & Transport Co	50,000	18	8		Tepetate	Port Lobos		May 1920
Cias del Agwi	50,000	22	10	36,000	Amatlan	Tecomate (Note: Agwi terminal south of Mata Redonda)		9 Apr 1920
Cias del Agwi	50,000		10	14,000	San Sebastian	Tecomate		1 Nov 1920
Texas Co	29,000	20	10	29,000	Tepetate	Agua Dulce	Tepetate	Nov 1918
Penn-Mex Fuel Co	25,000		8	25,000	Alamo	Tuxpan	Alamo; Zapotal	
Total	561,500							

River barge capacity from Northern Fields to Coast (Dec 1920)
	Barrels/Day	Sterwheelers	Tugs	Steel Barges	Wood Barges
Tampico Navigation Co	35,000				
Freeport & Mexican Fuel Oil Co	23,000	2	1	0	10 x 6,000
Texas Co	20,500				
Transcontinental Petr. Co	19,000	2	3	0	37 x 5,500-6,000
Mexican Gulf Oil Co	16,000	0	3	2 x 10,000; 5 x 5,000	4 x 5,500
Interior Navigation Co	15,000	1	1	0	4 x 10,000
National Petr. Corp	10,000	2	0	1 x 10,000	4 x 10,000
Terminal Union Co	8,000	1	0	0	2 x 8,000
National Oil Co	7,000	0	0	0	6 x 10,000
New England Fuel Oil Co	6,000	towed by others		0	2 x 6,000
Huasteca Petr. Co (Note: Oil purchased from other companies)	5,000	1	1	2 x 10,000	
Cia Mexicana de Combustibles	800	towed by others		0	1 x 2,100
Total	165,300				

The first export of Mexican crude oil sailed on or around May 26, 1911, 32,000bbl aboard the Standard Oil Co. steamer Captain Lucas from Tampico, the oil provided by the Huasteca Petroleum Company.

In addition to the ports of Tampico and Tuxpan, there were 7 oil loading terminals constructed on the land separating Tamiahua Lagoon from the Gulf of Mexico, all between the Tanguijo Reef (21.13953°N 97.27216°W) and Isla Lobos (21.46993°N 97.22639°W), from south to north:

Port Lobos oil terminals
Name	Company	Location	From	Until
Tecomate	Agwi	21.15668°N 97.39753°W		
Mata Redonda	Transcontinental	21.17545°N 97.40500°W	Apr 1920	(Note: Transcontinental closed on August 1, 1922 and Tide Mex Oil kept part of the facilities going a little longer.)
Chorrera	Mexican Seaboard Oil	21.20076°N 97.41299°W		Aug 1925
Palo Blanco	Island Oil & Transport	21.24283°N 97.42278°W	June 1918	
Guayavalillo
San Nicolas	Cortez Oil Corp		4 Aug 1918	
Agua Dulce	Texaco	21.49317°N 97.34333°W	1918	

Port Lobos was closed when Mexican Seaboard Oil Co. as the last of the 7 suspended operations at its Chorreras terminal on August 1, 1925.

Shipments of Mexican Oil By Company
Company	08/1915	08/1916	08/1917	08/1918	08/1919	08/1920	08/1922
via Tampico
Huasteca Petr. Co.	542,278	415,417	1,166,512	1,328,090	1,141,920	2,609,899	3,510,780
Transcontinental Petr. Co. (Note: subsidiary of Standard Oil of NJ)	97,000					1,369,260	222,177
Standard Oil of NJ		513,416	379,193	485,703	686,578		
Mexican Eagle Oil Co.	260,000	129,560	133,109	339,805	424,264	725,454	1,435,791
Tampico Co. (Note: Texaco subsidiary. 08/1915 and 08/1916 attributed to the Tampico Co., all else to the Texas Co.); Texas Co.	265,353	133,629	88,038	177,866	55,732	536,054	264,946
Mexican Gulf Oil Co.	63,807	100,000	107,351	258,099	558,558	1,031,463	955,225
East Coast Oil Co. (Note: Excluding Freeport Sulphur shipments)	192,867	123,900	207,671	207,538	392,004	203,852	167,395
Freeport Sulphur Transportation Co (Note: All shipments attributed to East Coast Oil Co. by the Oil & Gas Journal on a Freeport owned ship to Freeport, Texas)	0	0	106,889	124,212	155,035	198,405	229,185
Freeport & Mexican Fuel Oil Corp	20,000	137,306	278,753	448,769	346,092	784,736	699,285
Pierce Oil Corp	19,000	42,000	41,159	118,860	45,644	123,333	85,431
La Corona Petr. Co. Cia Mex. Holandesa La Corona (Note: 08/1922 attributed to this company)	32,000	30,000			111,853	458,525	1,546,954
Interocean Oil Co			70,710	23,624	45,644	35,779	51,870
National Oil Co.						171,337	
National Petr. Corp				56,014	61,254	168,329	258,999
New England Fuel Oil Co.					11,118	134,574	174,741
Swiftsure Oil Co.							334,387
Continental Mexican Petr. Co.							339,038
U.S. Mex. Oil Corp							163,143
Cochrane, Harper & Co					110,082	94,822	
Cia. Terminal Union						68,811	
Talvez Oil Co					25,947	12,898	
Panuco-Boston Oil Co							49,387
Penn-Mex Fuel Co.					19,981		
via Port Lobos (Note: Southwest of Isla de Lobos, where the shore follows a northeasterly path. Host to the following oil loading stations: Tecomate, Mata Redonda, Chorrera, Palo Blanco, Guayabalillo, Port Lobos (San Nicolas), Agua Dulce The terminal and refinery of Texaco at Agua Dulce was 6 miles south of a well drilled on Idolo Island.)
Island Oil & Transport Co.				241,000	522,901	1,392,622	236,395
Cortez Oil Corp				308,000	1,021,887	691,262	162,970
Texaco					488,002	522,624	384,107
Transcontinental Petr. Co. (Note: Mata Redonda terminal. just south of Tamiahua.)						939,881	317,948
Cia Refinadora del Agwi						1,062,728	515,093
International Petro. Co.							1,057,345
Huasteca Petro. Co.						373,658	
via Tuxpan
Mexican Eagle Oil Co.	826,214	778,374	1,066,552	421,053	683,936	680,484	363,437
Penn-Mex Fuel Co.	448,108	388,227	330,321	443,508	992,291	892,557	73,752
Total	2,845,627	2,791,829	3,975,334	5,011,762	7,907,237	14,837,865	13,590,781

Penn-Mex Fuel Co.: incorporated in Delaware ca. July 1912 with $10 million capital. The company had under lease some 160,000 acres. In early 1913 It became a subsidiary of South Penn Oil Company (segregated from Standard Oil in 1911). On May 22, 1913 Alamo No. 1 (1,000bpd) was completed and on October 28, 1913 Alamo No. 2 (20,000bpd), located near the Tuxpan river. No adequate storage was available, but the well could be shut in without leakage. The company completed in December 1914 two 26 mile pipelines from their El Alamo field to Tuxpan, a 4-inch water line and an 8-inch oil line. At that time a 13.5 mile railroad was built from the Tuxpan river bank near Zapotal to El Alamo in place of a prior mule haulage way (and far from the shortest route to reach the river from Alamo it ran approximately parallel to it). Zapotal (20.8562°N 97.48884°W was also the site of the permanent intermediate pumping station that was put in operation in the latter part of 1916 some time after the Alamo station at the line's ingress point. As shown on the map: The first of 4 sea loading lines was ready at the end of February 1915, establishing one loading berth 6,660ft from the beach. The first shipment of 64,600bbl, consigned to Standard of NJ, departed on the C. A. Canfield (a Doheny boat) on March 26, 1915 after loading for 36 hours since 10:41am on the 25th. The terminal was on the south bank of the Tuxpan river where it flows into the Gulf and was named Alvarez by the company. The site also hosted the company general offices and was opposite to the older Mexican Eagle Oil terminal on the north bank. Eventually there were at least 28 wells at Alamo. ... In June 1927 Penn-Mex settled their lawsuit out of court and restarted operations. At that point there were 3 holes at Paso Real drilled to cap rock. Profits reported were: $1,965,701 (1928), $283,510 (1929). In September 1932 the firm's capital stock was reduced from $10 million ($25 par) to $400,000 ($1 par). In October 1932 the Consolidated Oil Corp offered slightly more than $1 per share and a further time-limited royalty on oil produced. South Penn Oil sold all 220,000 of the 400,000 outstanding shares it held in bulk. The operation was to be combined with Consolidated Oil's existing operation in Mexico. The sale happened in response to the 1932 U.S. oil import tariffs, distribution was to be directed to Central and South America. In 1928 the stock had traded at a high of $84, when after being the only company in 1927 to make gains (of almost 400%) in an industry that declined by 31.3%, Penn-Mex was predicted to continue growing even further in 1928, and they did: production went up to 4,256,267 (1928) from 2,399,356 (1927). In 1941, Penn-Mex accepted $300,000 compensation for the 1938 expropriation of its assets. The 50c par stock stopped trading on the New York Curb exchange on July 15, 1942 and the Penn-Mex Fuel Co. was liquidated at the end of 1942.

East Coast Oil Co. - an affiliate of the Southern Pacific Railroad Company, worked for about one year in 1911/1912 (since 1909) a lease 9 miles north of Tuxpan, drilled 3 holes with one reaching 4,000ft, but suspended their efforts there and moved to their other leases in the Panuco district near Tampico. There they drilled the first two wells of the district about 1.5 miles from the town of Panuco. No. 1 was completed August 4, 1910 at 2,700ft with a flow of 150bpd, No. 2 on March 17, 1911 at 1,800ft flowing at 400bpd (12° gravity). An 8-inch line was laid to the Panuco River for onward shipment by river barge to Tampico. At the end of 1911, the company had 2 producers at Panuco, 2 at Topila and at Topila had just completed the first 2x37,500bbl tanks and a 1.5 mile 8-inch line from the field to the Panuco river. This was in addition to 5 earthen reservoirs previously built at Topila, where the No. 2 well had a pinched-off minimum flow of 2,500bpd (i.e. leakage could not be prevented) down from the initial 5,000bpd when oil was struck on March 24, 1911. On October 1, 1911 Texaco began shipping East Coast Co. oil to Texas, a service for which they received 50% of the production. The company laid at the end of 1912 40 miles of 8-inch pipe from near Panuco through Topila to its tank farm on the Torres tract, 10 miles west of Tampico, with the stretch from Topila to Torres consisting of two pipes. For pipeline details see: The 5,150 ton tanker Topila was built by Newport News Shipbuilding for $600k and finished trials in August 1913. The tanker Torres was launched at the Newport News Shipnuilding yard on May 12, 1917. The keel of the 16,340dwt tanker Tamiahua was laid February 28, 1921 at the Moore Shipbuilding Company yard where it was launched July 2, 1921. In 1929 Southern Pacific sold the 3 tankers to the Richfield Oil Company: Tamiahua (130,000bbl), Topila (55,000bbl), Torres (55,000bbl).

Island Oil & Transport Co. - As the conclusion of a legal dispute, on April 20, 1920 the Metropolitan Petroleum Corp. of Virginia agreed to settle all its debts and exchange its property for 525,000 shares of Island Corp. stock and representation on the board, after which Metropolitan Petroleum was dissolved. The company was put into receivership on March 20, 1922 when its capital structure could not weather the burden of the widespread appearance of salt water in Mexican oil wells.

Texas Company - was represented by R. E. Brooks interests, the Tampico Company and the Panuco Transportation Company.

Pierce Oil Corporation - incorporated in Virginia on June 21, 1913 as the successor of the Waters-Pierce Oil Company and (since April 30, 1918) the Pierce-Fordyce Oil Association. On May 7, 1924 received for all its assets 1,103,679 shares of Pierce Petroleum, which also assumed all liabilities but not Pierce Oil preferred stock. These assets were: (a) 5 refineries totaling 48,000bpd

- Fort Worth - built in the first half of 1912
- Texas City purchased by Pierce-Fordyce as a 3,000bpd plant in 1911 for $172,000 and with some $500,000 at the same time enlarged to 5,000bpd
- Sand Springs with a capacity of 8,000bpd completed January 1914
- Tampico - built before 1908 to refine crude imported from the United States. In May 1911, at the beginning of the Mexican oil boom, it was running at capacity (5,000bpd) and enlargements were underway.
- Veracruz

(b) 25,360 acres of oil lands leased and some owned in OK, TX, AR, Tampico, (c) 3 tankers (Mexicano, Pennant, Solarina), 1,600 tank cars, (d) 1,150 distribution stations, (e) a 35 mile 6-inch pipe line owned in fee from Cushing Field to Sand Springs, a 100 mile 8-inch pipe line (completed in 1917) from Healdton field (OK) to Fort Worth. An offer to Pierce Oil shareholders to exchange their stock for Pierce Petroleum stock was cancelled for all applicants when not enough signed up for it.

Pierce Petroleum Corp. - incorporated in Delaware on April 25, 1924. Of the 2,500,000 shares authorized, 1,103,679 were issued and exchanged for all properties of Pierce Oil; the remaining 1,396,321 were issued (underwritten by Lehman Bros, Goldman Sachs and Hornblower & Weeks), offered to Pierce Oil stockholders at $7 per share and used to settle obligations including claims arising out the settlement with International & Great Northern Railroad. The company was dissolved in June 1930. In exchange for all assets, the Sinclair Consolidated Oil Corp. assumed all liabilities: (a) bonds (<= $460,000), (b) (gave cash to redeem at $102 and interest) 10,500 shares of preferred stock, (c) federal income tax (<=$500,000). Owners of Pierce Petr. Co. common stock received 645,834 shares of Sinclair stock. The Pierce Oil Co. whose only asset were 1,103,419.5 shares of Pierce Petr. Co. stock received ca. 285,000 Sinclair shares. Sinclair issued 700,000 new shares for this deal.
Waters-Pierce Oil Co. - successor in 1877 to H. C. Pierce & Co then named Waters, Pierce & Co, was a co-defendant in Standard Oil Co. of New Jersey v. United States with Standard Oil of New Jersey owning $274,700 of the $400,000 par capital of the company, the shares were subsequently distributed proportionally to the stockholders of Standard of New Jersey. On October 20, 1910 W-P closed the heretofore biggest deal in Mexican crude with Doheny's Mexican Petroleum Co.: delivery of 2,500,000 barrels of southern field (min 14° gravity) at 82.5 cents a barrel. On July 25, 1913 the Pierce Oil Corp acquired all assets of the Waters-Pierce Oil Co. in exchange for (1) $5m in cash, (2) the entire newly issued $10.5m outstanding common stock of Pierce Oil Corp, (3) retirement of $1,250,000 Waters-Pierce debt and (4) retirement of $1,400,000 Pierce-Fordyce Oil Association debt. Each $100 stock of Waters-Pierce (total $400,000 outstanding) thus received $1,250 cash and $2,625 Pierce Oil stock. Pierce Oil Corp issued $8m in 10-year notes to facilitate the cash payment and debt retirement.
Mexican Fuel [Oil] Co. - was the production subsidiary of Pierce Oil in Mexico, active in the Topila field. The company struck its first ever gusher (Tamboyche No. 3, est. 20,000bpd) on September 13, 1918. Other Topila wells were named Santa Fe, of which there were at least 9, El Cerito on the Herrera property, of which there were at least 3.

Pierce Oil common stock (Note: 1918 1019 1920 1921 1922 1923 1924 1925 1926 1927 1928)
		Jan	Feb	Mar	Apr	May	Jun	Jul	Aug	Sep	Oct	Nov	Dec
1918	High								17 1/2	17 3/4	19 1/8	18 1/2	17
1918	Low								16 1/2	14 7/8	16 1/4	15 5/8	15 3/4
1919	High	19 3/8	18 1/4	19 3/8	26 3/4	28 5/8	27	25 1/4	23 1/2	22 7/8	22 3/4	21 5/8	20 5/8
1919	Low	16	18 3/8	17	18 1/4	24 3/4	20 7/8	22 1/4	20	21	20 1/2	18	17
1920	High	23 1/4	19	19 1/4	20 1/2	18 1/2	16 5/8	16 3/8	13	15 7/8	15 1/4	15 1/4	12 1/2
1920	Low	18 1/2	15 7/8	17 1/4	16	15	15 1/2	11 1/2	11	12 5/8	12 1/2	11 1/2	9
1921	High	11 7/8	11	11 1/8	11 1/2	11	10	8 3/4	7 7/8	7 5/8	7 1/2	14 1/8	13 5/8
1921	Low	10 1/4	10 1/4	10	9 3/4	9	7 1/4	6 1/2	5 1/4	6 1/4	6 1/2	6 3/4	10 5/8
1922	High	12	9 3/4	9 3/8	10 7/8	11 1/4	10 1/2	8 3/4	7 7/8	7 3/4	7 3/4	5 7/8	4 5/8
1922	Low	9	7	7	8 3/4	9 1/4	7 5/8	7 1/2	7	6	5 3/8	4 1/8	3 7/8
1923	High	4 5/8	6	5 1/8	4 3/4	4 1/4	3 3/4	3 1/8	2 3/4	2 5/8	2	2 7/8	3
1923	Low	4	4	4 1/4	4	3	2	1 1/2	2 3/8	1 7/8	1 1/2	1 1/2	2
1924	High	4 1/2	3 5/8	3 1/4	2 1/8	2 1/2	2	2	2 7/8	1 7/8	1 7/8	1 7/8	1 7/8
1924	Low	2 1/4	3	2 1/8	1 1/2	1 1/2	1 1/2	1 5/8	1 3/4	1 5/8	1 5/8	1 5/8	1 1/2
1925	High	2 1/2	3 1/2	2 7/8	2 1/4	2 1/2	2 1/2	2 1/8	2	1 7/8	1 7/8	1 3/4	1 3/4
1925	Low	1 3/4	2 1/2	2	1 3/4	1 3/4	1 7/8	1 3/4	1 1/2	1 1/2	1 1/2	1 1/4	1 1/4
