= Kindred Spirits =

Kindred Spirit(s) may refer to:

== Arts and entertainment ==
=== Film and television ===
- Kindred Spirits (1984 film), an Australian film
- Kindred Spirits (2019 film), an American horror mystery thriller
- A Kindred Spirit, a Hong Kong TV drama series
- Kindred Spirits (TV series), an American paranormal/reality series
- "Kindred Spirits", an episode of Danny Phantom, 2006
- "Kindred Spirits", a episode of The Incredible Hulk 1978 TV series

=== Literature ===
- Kindred Spirits (novel), in the Dragonlance fictional universe, 1991
- Kindred Spirits on the Roof, a 2012 adult yuri visual novel

=== Music ===
- Kindred Spirit (band), a duo consisting of Debbi Peterson and Siobhan Maher
- Kindred Spirits, a 2012 album by Clan of Xymox
- Kindred Spirits, a 2020 album by Larkin Poe
- Kindred Spirit, a 1966 album whose tapes were stolen from by Lisa Kindred
- Kindred Spirits (Waylander album), 2012
- Kindred Spirits (Zoe Rahman album), 2012
- "Kindred Spirits", a song by Liquid Tension Experiment from the 1998 album Liquid Tension Experiment
- Kindred Spirits: A Tribute to the Songs of Johnny Cash, 2002

=== Visual arts ===
- Kindred Spirits (painting), by Asher Brown Durand
- Kindred Spirits (sculpture), an outdoor sculpture in Bailick Park, Midleton, Ireland

== Other uses ==
- Kindred Spirit, a cultivar of the Quercus × warei hybrid oak tree
