= Thomas Joseph Steed =

American politician

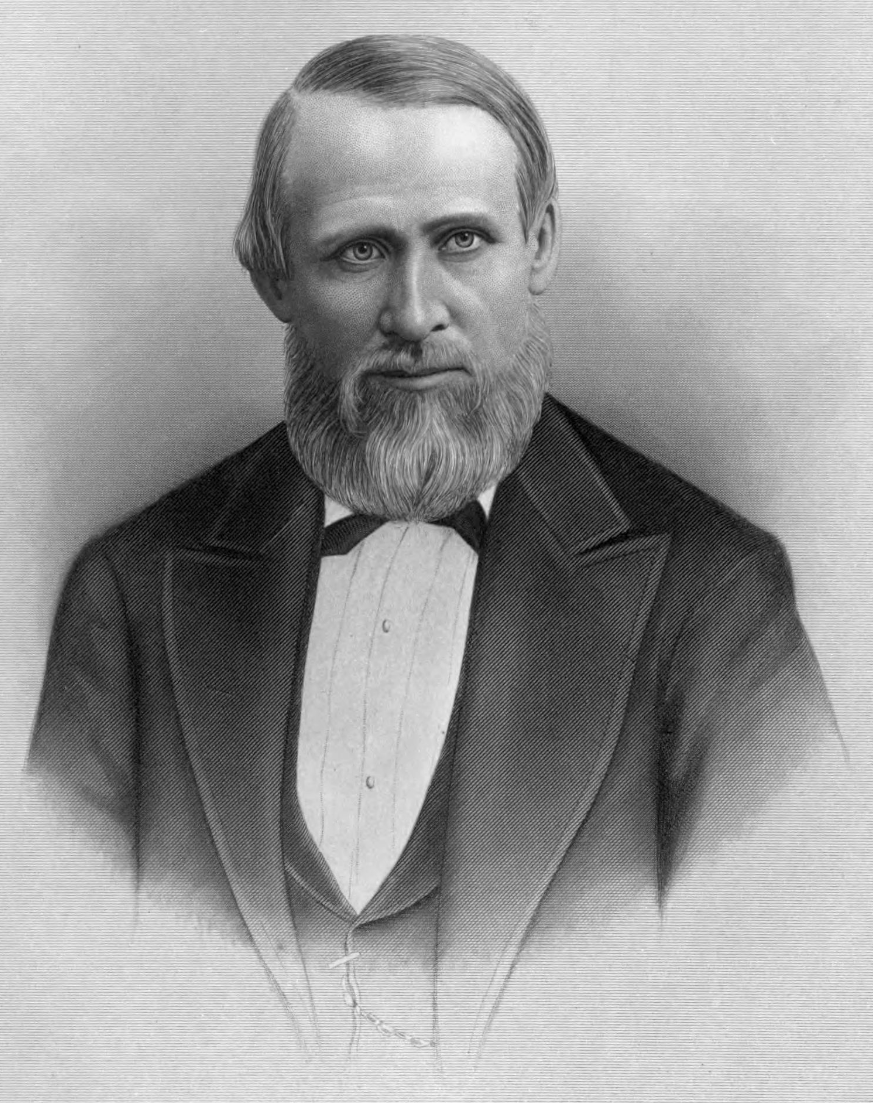

Personal details
- Born: 13 December 1826; Great Malvern, Worcestershire, England
- Died: 26 June 1910 (aged 83); Salt Lake City, Utah, U.S.
- Resting place: Farmington City Cemetery
- Spouse(s): 4
- Children: 10
- Parents: Thomas Steed and Charlotte Niblett
- Signature

Thomas Joseph Steed (13 December 1826 – 26 June 1910) was an early Mormon pioneer in the Church of Jesus Christ of Latter-day Saints. He was a polygamist, and author, with his diary being published posthumously in 1925.

His descendants include a number of people that later formed the Fundamentalist Church of Jesus Christ of Latter-Day Saints, including Warren Steed Jeffs, Rachel Jeffs, Heleman Jeffs, Lyle Jeffs and Elissa Wall.

== Biography ==
Thomas Joseph Steed was born in Great Malvern, Worcestershire on December 13, 1826.

He died at LDS Hospital in Salt Lake City on June 26, 1910, following surgery for a hernia.

== Bibliography ==
- Steed, Thomas (1925). The Life of Thomas Steed from His Own Diary 1826-1910.
