= SS W. L. Steed =

American oil tanker launched in 1918

Coordinates: 38°25′50.21″N 74°46′04.61″W

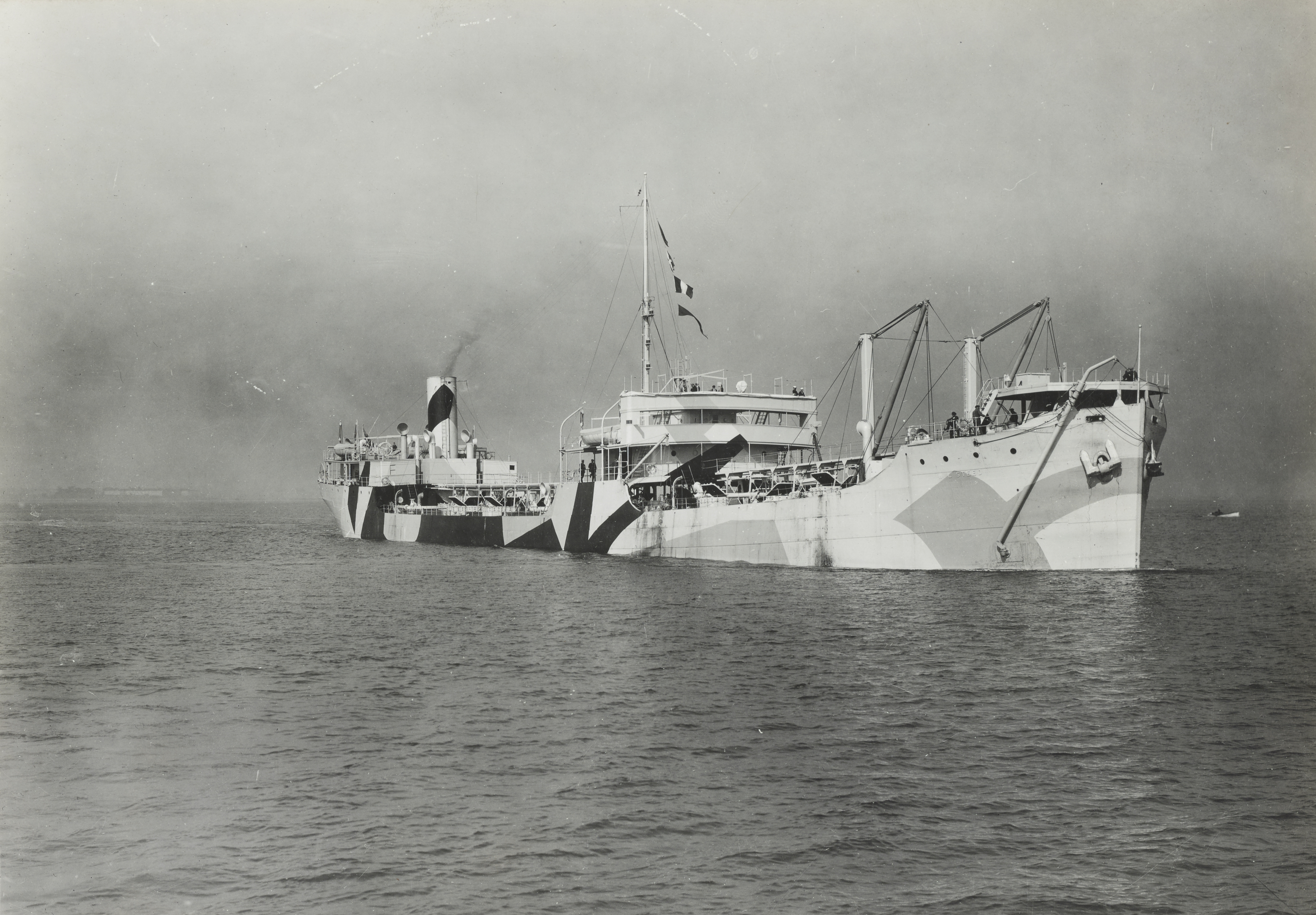
- SS W. L. Steed in 1918

History

United States
- Name: W. L. Steed
- Namesake: William L. Steed
- Owner: USSB (1918–1920); Pan American Petroleum & Transport Co. (1920–1932); Standard Oil Company of New Jersey (1932–1942)
- Operator: Mexican Petroleum Co. (1920–1932); Pan American Foreign Co. (1932–1935); Standard Oil Company of New Jersey (1935–1942)
- Builder: Bethlehem Shipbuilding Corp., Quincy
- Cost: US$1,060,108.61
- Yard number: 269
- Laid down: 9 November 1917
- Launched: 2 September 1918
- Completed: 9 September 1918
- Commissioned: 18 September 1918
- Maiden voyage: 28 September 1918
- Home port: Boston (1918–1920); Los Angeles (1920–1932); Wilmington (1932–1942)
- Identification: US Official Number: 216877; Call sign LMTG (1918–1933); Call sign WSEE (1934–1942)
- Fate: Sunk, 2 February 1942

History

United States
- Name: USS W. L. Steed
- Operator: U.S. Navy (1918–1919)
- Acquired: 10 August 1918
- Commissioned: 18 September 1918
- Decommissioned: 26 March 1919
- Fate: Returned to owners 26 March 1919

General characteristics
- Type: Design 1045 Tankship
- Tonnage: 6,182 GRT; 3,799 NRT; 9,030 DWT
- Displacement: 13,665 tons (normal)
- Length: 416 ft 8 in (127.00 m)
- Beam: 56 ft 1 in (17.09 m)
- Draft: 25 ft 6 in (7.77 m) (mean)
- Depth: 31 ft 1 in (9.47 m)
- Installed power: 525 Nhp, 2,600 ihp
- Propulsion: Bethlehem Shipbuilding Co. 3-cylinder triple expansion
- Speed: 10 1/2 knots (12.1 mph; 19.4 km/h)
- Armament: During WWI; 1 × 6 in (152 mm) naval gun; 1 × 3 in (76 mm) naval gun

W. L. Steed was a steam tanker built in 1917–1918 by Bethlehem Shipbuilding Corporation of Quincy for Pan American Petroleum and Transport Company, with intention of transporting oil and petroleum products between Mexican and Gulf ports and the Northeast of the United States. The ship was briefly requisitioned by the US Government during World War I but returned to commercial service in early 1919. The ship was named after William L. Steed, superintendent of the Mexican Petroleum Company of California.

== Design and construction ==
Early in 1917 Pan American Petroleum & Transport Co. decided to add two more tankers of approximately 9,000 deadweight to its existing fleet, expanding their oil carrying business. A contract for these vessels was awarded to the Bethlehem Shipbuilding Corp. On August 3, 1917, the future tanker along with her sister-ship George W. Barnes were requisitioned by the Emergency Fleet Corporation (EFC) for war purposes. Due to the fact that Bethlehem Shipbuilding Corp. was awarded US government contract to build several steel tankers designated as Design 1045 ships, it was decided to use the same blueprint to construct these vessels as well. The ship was laid down at the Fore River shipyard in Quincy (yard number 269) on 9 November 1917, and launched on 2 September 1918, with Mrs. Paul H. Harwood, wife of vice-president of Pan American Petroleum & Transport Company, serving as the sponsor. During the launch the vessel struck the ledge on the opposite side of the river and had several plates bent in around her starboard side #4 hold, which, however, did not prevent her speedy completion. The vessel construction was completed on September 9, which set a new record with less than nine days passing between the launching and delivery. After successfully finishing sea trials on September 10, she was placed in a drydock to repair the damage sustained during the launching, and was not officially accepted by USSB until September 18.

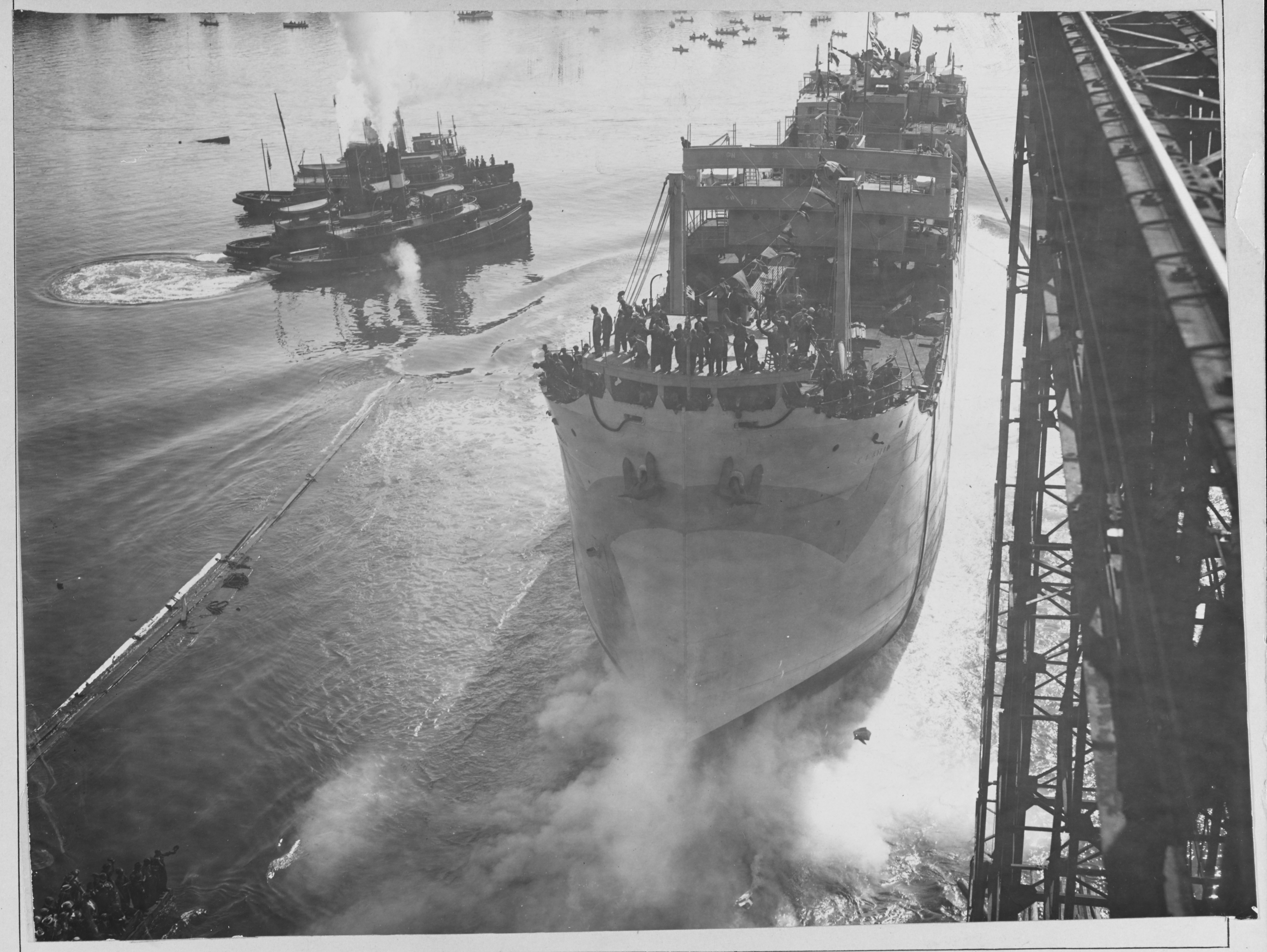
The launch of SS W. L. Steed on September 2, 1918.

The ship was built on the Isherwood principle of longitudinal framing providing extra strength to the body of the vessel, and had two main decks. The vessel was later equipped with wireless of De Forest type. The tanker had a cargo pump room located amidships, and had cargo tanks constructed throughout the vessel with a total capacity to carry 3,200,000 US gallons of oil.

As built, the ship was 416 feet 8 inches (127.00 m) long (between perpendiculars) and 56 feet 1 inch (17.09 m) abeam, and had a depth of 31 feet 1 inch (9.47 m). W. L. Steed was originally assessed at 6,450 GRT and 4,620 NRT and had deadweight of approximately 9,030. The vessel had a steel hull, and a single 525 Nhp (2,600 ihp) vertical triple expansion steam engine, with cylinders of 26 1/2-inch (67 cm), 44-inch (110 cm) and 74-inch (190 cm) diameter with a 51-inch (130 cm) stroke, that drove a single screw propeller and moved the ship at up to 10 1/2 knots (12.1 mph; 19.4 km/h). The steam for the engine was supplied by three single-ended Scotch boilers fitted for oil fuel.

== Operational history ==
=== U.S. Navy service, World War I ===
W. L. Steed was inspected by the U.S. Navy in the 3rd Naval District for possible World War I Navy service on 10 August 1918 while the ship was nearing the end of construction. Upon completion and delivery on 18 September 1918 the ship was formally taken over by the Navy, assigned the naval registry Identification Number (Id. No.) 3449 and was commissioned on the same day as USS W. L. Steed and transferred to the Naval Overseas Transportation Service.

W. L. Steed departed Boston on 28 September 1918 for her first trip under Navy control and proceeded first to Philadelphia to load a cargo of fuel oil. She then continued on to New York and then Sydney to finish loading before sailing on 23 October for Devonport. Once under way, the tanker developed problems with her steering gear and had to turn back. After finalizing temporary repairs at St. John's W. L. Steed sailed again on 10 November but had to turn around next day when the Armistice with Germany that ended the war was signed. After arriving in New York on 13 November, she entered the drydock for repairs that lasted through the end of the month.

The tanker finally managed to deliver her cargo to Le Havre in France in December 1918, however, on her very next trip from New Orleans in February 1919 she again ran into problems with her machinery and had to be put into New York on 18 February 1919. Upon completion of repairs the tanker was decommissioned on 26 March 1919 and returned to USSB on the same day.

=== Commercial service ===
Soon after release from the Navy service, W. L. Steed was allocated to McAllister Bros. while still remaining under USSB control. The tanker entered oil carrying service between Mexican ports of Tampico, Tuxpan and Puerto Lobos and the US ports in the Northeast in June 1919 and remained in it through early spring 1920. On March 25, 1920, the tanker was sold by USSB to Pan American Petroleum and Transport Co. for US$749,861.34 and was put under control of its subsidiary, Mexican Petroleum Co. Following the transfer the ship arrived at Galveston on April 9 to undergo repairs and maintenance, but instead was sent back to Tampico to load another cargo of oil to be delivered to New York.

During one of these trips, on May 25, 1920, W. L. Steed was leaving the Huasteca Dock on the Pánuco River fully loaded with petroleum products. While maneuvering in the river in an attempt to make a U-turn, the steamer damaged her rudder and as a result came into collision with tank barge Portsmouth being towed by steam tug Hulver up river for loading. The damage to the barge was limited to her rigging, and the tanker suffered only minor damage to her railings and stern flagpole. After undergoing temporary repairs at Tampico, the vessel sailed to New York where she entered a drydock in July for permanent repairs. The vessel continued transporting oil from Mexico to various Gulf ports, such as Galveston, Port Eads and New Orleans as well as petroleum products from the Gulf to the Northeast ports of New York, Baltimore and Philadelphia through early part of 1925.

Following a continuing decline in Mexican oilfields production, W. L. Steed was reassigned to the California to East coast route. The tanker transited through the Panama Canal for the first time on her new route on March 14, 1925, and returned on April 7 carrying 9,000 tons of gasoline from San Pedro to New Orleans. The vessel largely continued carrying gasoline from West coast refineries to various East coast ports through 1929 with occasional trips to Tampico.

On March 26, 1925 a syndicate including Standard Oil of Indiana acquired a controlling interest in Pan American Petroleum & Transport. Standard of Indiana soon bought out the other members of the syndicate and by 1930 had absorbed over 90% of the outstanding common stock of Pan American.

In 1932, Standard of Indiana sold Pan American's foreign properties (the core of which were oil production assets in Mexico and Venezuela and the tanker fleet) to the Standard Oil of New Jersey in the form of a new subsidiary (Pan American Foreign Corp), which was merged into Jersey Standard in 1936. During these transitional times, W. L. Steed was employed on new route carrying oil from Aruba to the ports on the Gulf and East coast of United States and continued serving it for almost two years.

On December 18, 1930, steamer Papoose was towed by four tugs for Todd's shipyards at Brooklyn. When this flotilla was near Downey's Shipyard, W. L. Steed with the tug Mexpet approached from the opposite direction and were then in the vicinity of Shooters Island. Both vessels were on their respective sides of the channel and were about to pass each other safely. When about fifteen to sixteen hundred feet apart, W. L. Steed suddenly altered her course attempting to cross the bow of Papoose. The engines of the three tugs alongside Papoose were reversed, and her anchor was dropped, but W. L. Steed did not stop or reverse engines, increasing her speed instead, attempting to swing around the bow of Papoose. W. L. Steed parted the towing hawser between Papoose and the tug, and then struck her starboard bow causing damage to both vessels.

In April 1932 Standard Oil of Indiana agreed to divest their newly acquired foreign assets of Pan American and sold them to Standard Oil of New Jersey. Following the acquisition, all foreign holdings and all ships acquired with them were incorporated as Pan American Foreign Company. Under new ownership W. L. Steed did not have an assigned route, but rather was used to transport oil and petroleum products from three different locations. One of them involved transporting oil from Venezuelan ports of Caripito, Guaira and Las Piedras to United States ports of Boston, New York and Baltimore. The tanker also carried gasoline and fuel oil from Gulf coast refineries of Baton Rouge, Port Eads and Baytown to a variety of ports along United States eastern seaboard. Finally, the ship continued making occasional trips to and from Aruba.

After over twenty years of nearly continuous operation, the tanker required an overhaul to her engines and arrived at Bayonne on 30 June 1939 to await her turn to be put in a drydock for repairs. She remained docked there through August 1939 and eventually proceeded to Mariner's Harbor to go through the needed maintenance work at the Bethlehem Steel Company's yard. All work with the exception of boiler replacement was finalized by the end of September, and W. L. Steed departed New York on 4 October 1939 bound for Aransas Pass.

During 1940 and 1941, W. L. Steed was primarily employed in coastwise trade transporting petroleum products from the Gulf ports to East coast, although the vessel made occasional journeys to foreign destinations such as Aruba and Cartagena among others. Overall, she made 17 voyages in 1940 and 22 trips in 1941, carrying overall bulk oil cargoes of 1,053,261 barrels (~1.437×10^{5} t) and 1,396,278 barrels (~1.905×10^{5} t), respectively. From July 4 to October 18, 1940, the tanker was tied up in Patuxent River to undergo further repairs, and in October 1941 she had finally had her old boilers removed and had a set of new ones built by Babcock & Wilcox installed.

=== Sinking ===
W. L. Steed departed on 14 January 1942 for her last voyage from Norfolk bound for Cartagena. The tanker was under command of captain Harold G. McAvenia and had a crew of 38 men. After a largely uneventful journey, the ship reached her destination a week later and after loading a cargo of 65,396 barrels (~8,922 t) of oil, departed on 23 January 1942 for her return trip. Her return voyage was also mostly uneventful until early afternoon of January 30, 1942, when a lookout spotted what he thought was a small fishing craft but soon decided to be a submarine. The tanker radioed for help, and a U.S. Navy patrol plane showed up about an hour later but by then the submarine went away. By midnight of January 31 the weather worsened with the winds and heavy seas getting progressively stronger. W. L. Steed continued through rough weather on her northerly course to her destination.

On February 2 it started snowing and visibility had shrunk to about 2 nautical miles (3.7 km). At approximately 12:45 when W. L. Steed was about 80 to 90 nautical miles (150 to 170 km) east of the mouth of Delaware River, German submarine U-103 under the command of Werner Winter fired one bow torpedo at the tanker. The vessel was struck on her starboard side, forward of the bridge and around No.3 tank setting the cargo of oil on fire. The engines were stopped and the captain ordered the crew to abandon ship. Four lifeboats were launched and the whole crew of nine officers and twenty nine seamen left the ship in orderly fashion. By this time, the submarine surfaced a few hundred yards from the tanker. Due to rough seas, the waves had extinguished the flames and captain Winter ordered to man the deck gun. W. L. Steed was hit 17 times after 83 shots were fired, which set the tanker afire again. Not willing to remain surfaced, the submarine launched two more torpedoes at the vessel delivering coup de grâce. One torpedo missed but the second one hit the ship causing explosion, shooting burning oil about 500 feet up in the air. W. L. Steed settled by the bow and shortly sank, while the submarine departed the scene in the southwesterly direction.

The U-boat's departure left the four boats alone in the frigid waters. While the lifeboats were well stocked with water and provisions, they lacked warm clothing or blankets. As W. L. Steed had been abandoned in a haste, most men entered the lifeboats in whatever clothing they were wearing at the time of the attack. The boats soon drifted apart and, one by one, the ill-clad sailors began dying from hypothermia.

All but two men in lifeboat No.2 died one by one until the morning of February 6 when the survivors spotted a vessel passing close by and were able to attract her attention. Both seamen were taken aboard British steamer SS Hartlepool and were landed at Halifax on February 9 where one of the survivors died the next day.

Lifeboat No.3 fell behind other boats from the beginning and the men in it decided to wait out the storm in their present location. They anchored the boat and as it got darker fired a few flares. After spotting a flare in the distance, they starting rowing in that direction but a huge wave went over them washing most of their oars, sails and rudder as well as other equipment overboard. The crew spent the night frantically pouring water from the lifeboat using any available means, as the storm grew stronger. The next morning one of the men died, and by noon another one died, and the last three survivors made a fire in the lifeboat in an attempt to stay warm. In the morning of February 4 they were spotted and taken on board by Canadian armed merchant cruiser Alcantara and landed at Halifax on February 7.

On 12 February 1942 British steamer SS Raby Castle on her passage to Cape Town came across lifeboat No. 4 containing four men, with only one of them being alive. The survivor was taken on board the ship but died from exposure three days later and was buried at sea. Lifeboat No. 1 which carried the captain and three other members of the crew was found empty on February 19 by steamer SS Poza Rica northwest of Cape Hatteras.
