= Tumaini Steede =

Bermudian footballer

Personal information
- Date of birth: 28 April 1990
- Place of birth: Bermuda
- Date of death: 11 July 2012 (aged 22)
- Place of death: Paget, Bermuda
- Position: Striker

Senior career*
Years	Team	Apps	(Gls)
2008–2012	Devonshire Cougars		

International career
2009	Bermuda U20	3	(0)
2008	Bermuda	2	(0)
- * Club domestic league appearances and goals

Tumaini Steede (28 April 1990 – 11 July 2012) was a Bermudian footballer who played as a striker.

== Career ==
Steede played club football for Devonshire Cougars. In 2011 he won the Bermuda Football Association Young Player of the Year award.

He earned two senior caps for the Bermuda national team, representing them at the 2007 Island Games. He also made 3 appearances for Bermuda under-20s during 2009 CONCACAF U-20 Championship qualifying.

== Death ==
Steede was involved in a motorcycle collision on 2 July 2012, and died from his injuries on 11 July 2012.
