= Stead =

Stead (pronounced 'sted' as in "instead") is an English surname, and may refer to:

== Surnames ==
- Barry Stead (1939–1980), English cricketer
- Bill Stead (1887–1939), English footballer
- C. K. Stead (born 1932), New Zealand writer and critic
- Callum Stead (born 1999), English footballer
- Charles Stead (1839–1916), Australian Methodist minister
- Christina Stead (1902–1983), Australian writer
- Dave Stead (born 1966), British drummer
- David Stead (cricketer) (born 1947), New Zealand cricketer
- David George Stead (1877–1957), Australian marine biologist, conservationist and writer
- Edgar Stead (1881–1949), New Zealand ornithologist, horticulturist and marksman
- Edwin Stead (1701–1735), Kent cricket patron and team captain
- Eugene A. Stead (1908–2005), American physician
- Gary Stead (born 1972), New Zealand cricketer and cricket coach
- George Christopher Stead (1913–2008), Cambridge professor of philosophy and Christian doctrine
- George Gatonby Stead (1841–1908), New Zealand grain merchant, racehorse owner and breeder, businessman
- Isabelle Stead (born 1979), British film producer, director and philanthropist
- J. H. Stead (c.1826–1886), English stage comedian and singer
- Jon Stead (born 1983), English footballer
- Martin Stead (born 1958), Canadian cricketer
- Matthew Stead (1840–1882), English architect
- Ralph Stead (1917–2000), British corporate chairman
- Robert J. C. Stead (1880–1959), Canadian journalist and author
- Ron Stead (1936–2011), Canadian baseball pitcher
- William Force Stead (1884–1967), American diplomat, poet, academic and clergyman
- William H. Stead (1858–1918), American politician and lawyer
- William Thomas Stead (1849–1912), British journalist
- Zita Stead (1904–1986), British medical illustrator

== Places ==
- Reno Stead Airport near Reno, Nevada, United States
- A location in Burley civil parish, West Yorkshire, England; see List of United Kingdom locations

== See also ==
- Bedstead
- Homestead (disambiguation)
- Kindred (disambiguation)
- Steed (disambiguation)
