= Maries River =

Stream in the US state of Missouri

The Maries River is a tributary of the Osage River in Pulaski, Maries, and Osage counties in the U.S. state of Missouri.

The headwaters of the Maries arise just to the north and west of Dixon in northern Pulaski County (37°59′54″N 92°07′05″W). The stream flows generally north into Maries County passing the communities of Brinktown and Venus. It passes under Missouri Route 42 west of Vienna and on into Osage County to the east of Argyle and Koeltztown. The stream enters a series of entrenched meanders and flows under U. S. Route 63 just southeast of Westphalia. It flows under U. S. Route 50 west of Loose Creek and turns west to its confluence with the Osage River just to the north of the Route 50 - Route 63 junction (38°29′39″N 92°00′26″W). At Westphalia, the river has an average annual discharge of 216 cubic feet per second.

The name Maries most likely is a corruption of the French marais, meaning "swamp".

== See also ==
- List of rivers of Missouri
