= Gascondy, Missouri =

Ghost town in Missouri, United States

Coordinates: 38°17′58″N 91°51′34″W

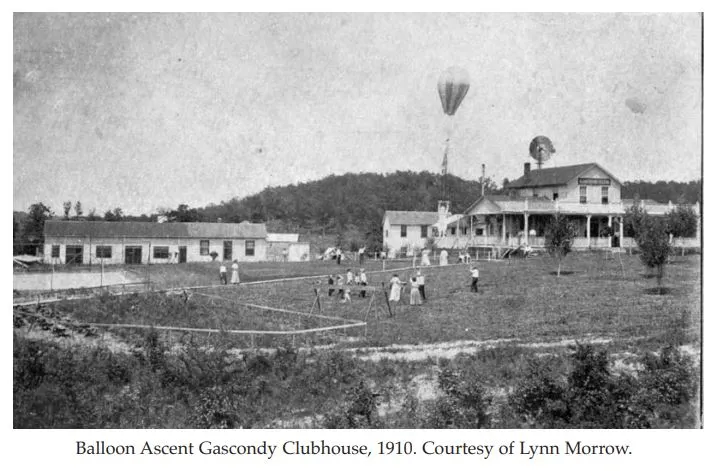
Gascondy Resort in 1910

Gascondy is an extinct town in southern Osage County, in the U.S. state of Missouri. The GNIS classifies it as a populated place.

The townsite was on the east side of the Gasconade floodplain along the railroad line between Freeburg to the west and Belle in northern Maries County to the east.

A post office called Gascondy was established in 1907, and remained in operation until 1942. The community most likely derives its name from the Gasconade River.
