= Buck Elk Creek =

River in the United States of America

Coordinates: 38°19′59″N 91°49′54″W

Buck Elk Creek is a stream in southern Osage County in the U.S. state of Missouri. It is a tributary of the Gasconade River.

The stream headwaters arise at just one mile north of Belle in adjoining Maries County and just west of Missouri Route 89 at an elevation of about 1,000 ft (300 m). The stream flows generally northwest to its confluence with the Gasconade at at an elevation of 577 ft (176 m).

Buck Elk Creek was so named due to the presence of elk in the area.

== See also ==
- List of rivers of Missouri
