= Lois, Missouri =

Unincorporated community in Missouri, U.S.

Coordinates: 38°08′53″N 91°45′21″W

Lois is an unincorporated community in eastern Maries County, in the U.S. state of Missouri.

The community is at the intersection of county roads 452 and 453 approximately one-half mile southeast of Missouri Route 28. Vichy is about two miles south on US Route 63 and Lanes Prairie is three miles north on Route 28. Spring Creek Gap Conservation Area is one mile to the west.

== History ==
A post office called Lois was established in 1889, and remained in operation until 1912. The community has the name of Lois Cordsmeyer, a young citizen.
