= Lanes Prairie, Missouri =

Unincorporated community in Missouri, U.S.

Coordinates: 38°11′10″N 91°43′45″W

Lanes Prairie is an unincorporated community in eastern Maries County, in the U.S. state of Missouri.

The community is just east of Missouri Route 28 on county road 419. Belle is approximately seven miles north on route 28 and Vienna is twelve miles west via Missouri routes Z and 42.

== History ==
A post office called Lane's Prairie was established in 1851. The community has the name of Charles Lane, a pioneer citizen.
