= Bend, Missouri =

Unincorporated community in Missouri, U.S.

Coordinates: 38°11′40″N 91°50′48″W

Bend is an unincorporated community in northeastern Maries County, in the U.S. state of Missouri.

The community is on Missouri Route Z just east of Missouri Route 42 and approximately five miles east of Vienna. The community of Paydown is about three miles to the northeast along Route 42. The Gasconade River flows past just over one mile south of the site.

== History ==
A post office called Bend was established in 1900, and remained in operation until 1917. The community derives its name from nearby Sinful Bend, a meander on the Gasconade River known for its rough characters.
