= Missouri Route 42 =

State highway in Missouri, U.S.

Route 42

Route information
- Maintained by MoDOT
- Length: 60.394 mi (97.195 km)

Major junctions
- West end: US 54 in Osage Beach
- US 63 in Vienna
- East end: Route 28 in Belle

Location
- Country: United States
- State: Missouri

Highway system
- Missouri State Highway System; Interstate; US; State; Supplemental
← Route 41	→ Route 43

Route 42 is a highway in central Missouri. Its eastern terminus is at Route 28 south of Belle; its western terminus is at US 54 in Osage Beach.

== Route description ==
Route 42 begins at the interchange of US 54 in Osage Beach, at a concurrency with Osage Beach Parkway. It intersects the terminus of Route 134 which allows access to the Lake of the Ozarks State Park. It passes through Brumley and Iberia where it intersects with Route 17 in Iberia. Route 42 has a brief concurrency with Route 133. Route 42 passes through Vienna where it intersects with US 63. Route 42 ends at Route 28 south of Belle.

== Major intersections ==
County	Location	mi	km	Destinations	Notes
Camden	Osage Beach	0.000	0.000	US 54 – Camdenton, Jefferson City	Interchange
Miller	Glaze Township	4.001	6.439	Route 134	Access to Lake of the Ozarks State Park
Miller	Iberia	21.600	34.762	Route 17 – Tuscumbia, Crocker	
Maries	Boone Township	33.701	54.237	Route 133 north – Meta	Western end of Route 133 overlap
Maries	Boone Township	33.922	54.592	Route 133 south – Hancock	Eastern end of Route 133 overlap
Maries	Vienna	44.303	71.299	US 63 – Freeburg, Vichy	
Maries	Belle	60.394	97.195	Route 28 to US 63 – Belle	
1.000 mi = 1.609 km; 1.000 km = 0.621 mi
