= Shawnee Creek (Baileys Creek tributary) =

Stream in the U.S. state of Missouri

Shawnee Creek is a stream in Osage and Gasconade counties of central Missouri. It is a tributary of Baileys Creek.

The stream headwaters are at 38°37′36″N 91°44′39″W and the confluence with Baileys Creek is at 38°41′02″N 91°37′56″W. The stream source is just east of Missouri Route 89 and it flows north to northeast passing under Missouri Route FF and entering the Missouri River valley midway between Chamois on the west and Morrison on the east. The stream turns east and flows along the south edge of the Missouri Valley. It crosses under Missouri Route 100 northeast of Morrison and enters Baileys Creek just after entering Gasconade County.

Shawnee Creek was named after Shawnee Indians in the area.

== See also ==
- List of rivers of Missouri
