= Argyle, Missouri =

- Town
- Village of Argyle
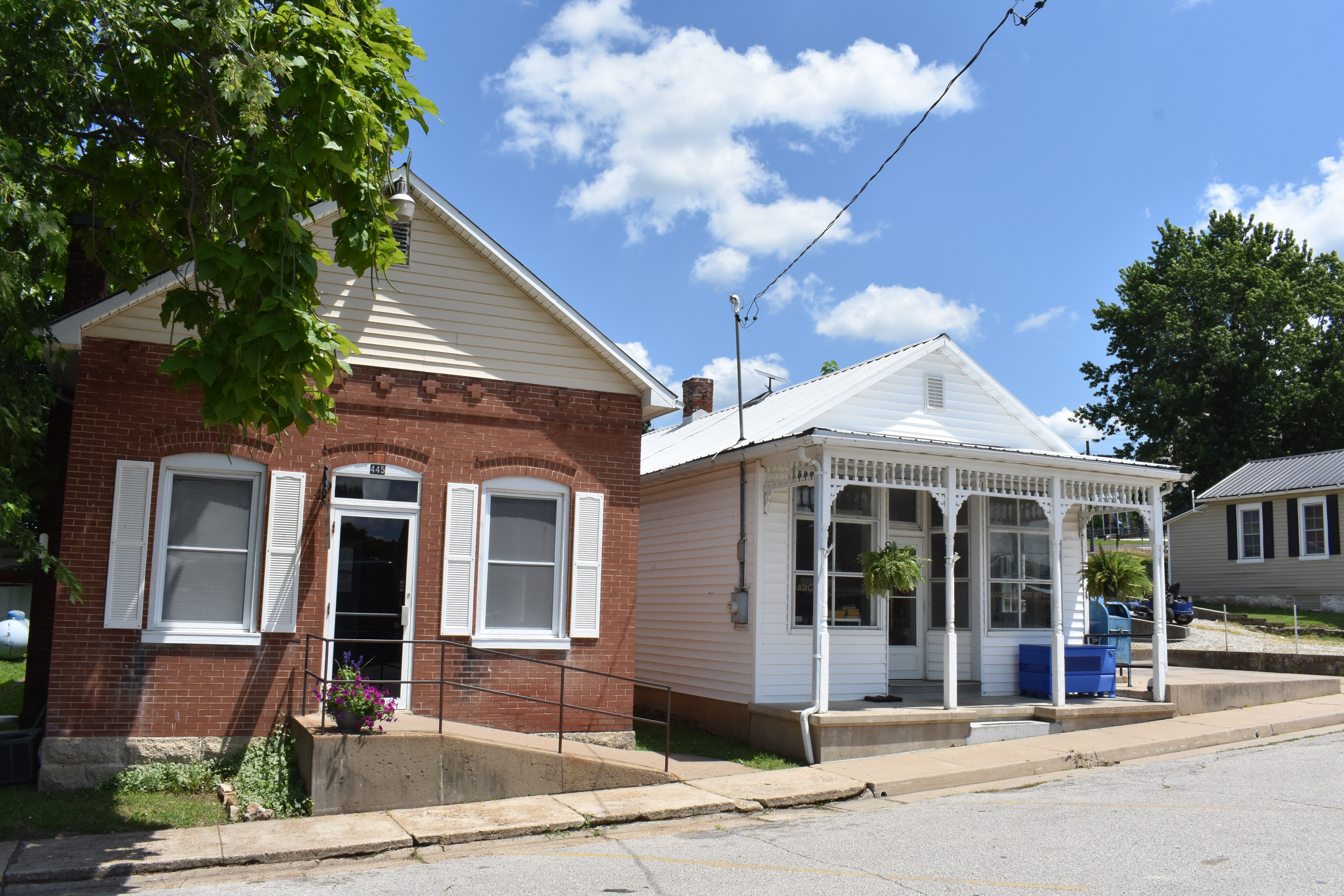
- Argyle in June 2026

- Location in Osage County and the state of Missouri
- Coordinates: 38°17′43″N 92°01′32″W
- Country: United States
- State: Missouri
- Counties: Osage, Maries
- Incorporated: 1904
- Named for: Argyll, Scotland

Area
  - Total: 0.40 sq mi (1.04 km^{2})
  - Land: 0.40 sq mi (1.04 km^{2})
  - Water: 0 sq mi (0.00 km^{2})
- Elevation: 745 ft (227 m)

Population (2020)
  - Total: 145
  - Density: 358/sq mi (138.1/km^{2})
- Time zone: UTC-6 (Central (CST))
  - Summer (DST): UTC-5 (CDT)
- ZIP code: 65001
- Area code: 573
- FIPS code: 29-01828
- GNIS feature ID: 2397437

Argyle (/ˈɑːrɡaɪl/ AR-ghyle) is a town in Osage and Maries counties in the U.S. state of Missouri. The population was 144 at the 2020 census.

The Osage County part of Argyle is part of the Jefferson City Metropolitan Area.

== History ==
A post office called Argyle has been in operation since 1904. Argyle was named after the region of Argyll, in Scotland. A variant name was "Campbell's Switch".

== Geography ==
Argyle is located in southern Osage County, within one-half mile of the Osage-Maries county line. A small area extends south of the county line into Maries County along Missouri routes T and AA. Argyle is on the north side of Loose Creek, approximately 1.5 miles (2.4 km) west of the Maries River. It is on Missouri Route T, and Koeltztown lies about 2 miles (3 km) to the north. Vienna is about 9 miles (14 km) to the southeast in Maries County, and Jefferson City, the state capital, is 29 miles (47 km) to the northwest.

According to the U.S. Census Bureau, the village has a total area of 0.40 square miles (1.04 km^{2}), all land, except for Loose Creek. Via the Maries River, Argyle is part of the Osage River watershed leading north to the Missouri River.

== Demographics ==
Historical population
Census	Pop.	Note	%±
1910	176		—
1920	239		35.8%
1930	213		−10.9%
1940	209		−1.9%
1950	162		−22.5%
1960	99		−38.9%
1970	262		164.6%
1980	216		−17.6%
1990	178		−17.6%
2000	164		−7.9%
2010	162		−1.2%
2020	144		−11.1%
U.S. Decennial Census

=== 2010 census ===
As of the census of 2010, there were 162 people, 75 households, and 42 families living in the village. The population density was 405.0 inhabitants per square mile (156.4/km^{2}). There were 81 housing units at an average density of 202.5 per square mile (78.2/km^{2}). The racial makeup of the village was 100.0% White. Hispanic or Latino of any race were 0.6% of the population.

There were 75 households, of which 18.7% had children under the age of 18 living with them, 49.3% were married couples living together, 1.3% had a female householder with no husband present, 5.3% had a male householder with no wife present, and 44.0% were non-families. 38.7% of all households were made up of individuals, and 18.6% had someone living alone who was 65 years of age or older. The average household size was 2.16 and the average family size was 2.93.

The median age in the village was 42 years. 22.2% of residents were under the age of 18; 9.4% were between the ages of 18 and 24; 20.4% were from 25 to 44; 22.8% were from 45 to 64; and 25.3% were 65 years of age or older. The gender makeup of the village was 49.4% male and 50.6% female.

=== 2000 census ===
As of the census of 2000, there were 164 people, 65 households, and 46 families living in the town. The population density was 409.2 inhabitants per square mile (158.0/km^{2}). There were 77 housing units at an average density of 192.1 per square mile (74.2/km^{2}). The racial makeup of the town was 100.00% White.

There were 65 households, out of which 35.4% had children under the age of 18 living with them, 56.9% were married couples living together, 10.8% had a female householder with no husband present, and 27.7% were non-families. 27.7% of all households were made up of individuals, and 15.4% had someone living alone who was 65 years of age or older. The average household size was 2.52 and the average family size was 3.09.

In the town the population was spread out, with 27.4% under the age of 18, 9.1% from 18 to 24, 26.8% from 25 to 44, 15.2% from 45 to 64, and 21.3% who were 65 years of age or older. The median age was 36 years. For every 100 females, there were 78.3 males. For every 100 females age 18 and over, there were 85.9 males.

The median income for a household in the town was $23,750, and the median income for a family was $29,688. Males had a median income of $26,406 versus $22,813 for females. The per capita income for the town was $12,274. About 12.2% of families and 15.7% of the population were below the poverty line, including none of those under the age of eighteen and 17.6% of those 65 or over.

== Education ==
The majority of the municipality, in Osage County, is in the Osage County R-III School District.

The portion in Maries County is in the Maries County R-I School District.

== Notable person ==
- Wilbur L. Creech, U.S. Air Force general
