= Pointers Creek =

Stream in the American state of Missouri

Pointers Creek is a stream in Osage County, Missouri.

The stream headwaters are at 38°27′44″N 91°48′26″W and the confluence with the Gasconade River is at 38°25′26″N 91°44′31″W. The source area for the stream lie just south of U.S. Route 50 and southwest of Potts. The stream flows about four miles to the southeast to enter the Gasconade.

Pointers Creek has the name of the local Pointer family.

== See also ==
- List of rivers of Missouri
