= Baileys Creek =

Stream in Missouri, U.S.

Baileys Creek is a stream in Osage and Gasconade counties of central Missouri. The stream flows to the northeast and has a confluence with the Missouri River, three miles northwest of Gasconade.

The stream source is at 38°33′52″N 91°45′36″W and its confluence is at 38°41′27″N 91°36′42″W. The stream headwaters are just east of Missouri Route 89 and north of Mint Hill. The stream flows to the southeast for the first three miles and then turns to the northeast. The stream meanders northeast roughly parallel to Missouri Route N until entering the Missouri River Valley just east of Morrison where it flows under Missouri Route 100.

Baileys Creek has the name of the local Bailey family. Variant names have been Deer Creek and Shawnee Creek.

== See also ==
- List of rivers of Missouri
