= Maries County Jail and Sheriff's House =

- U.S. National Register of Historic Places
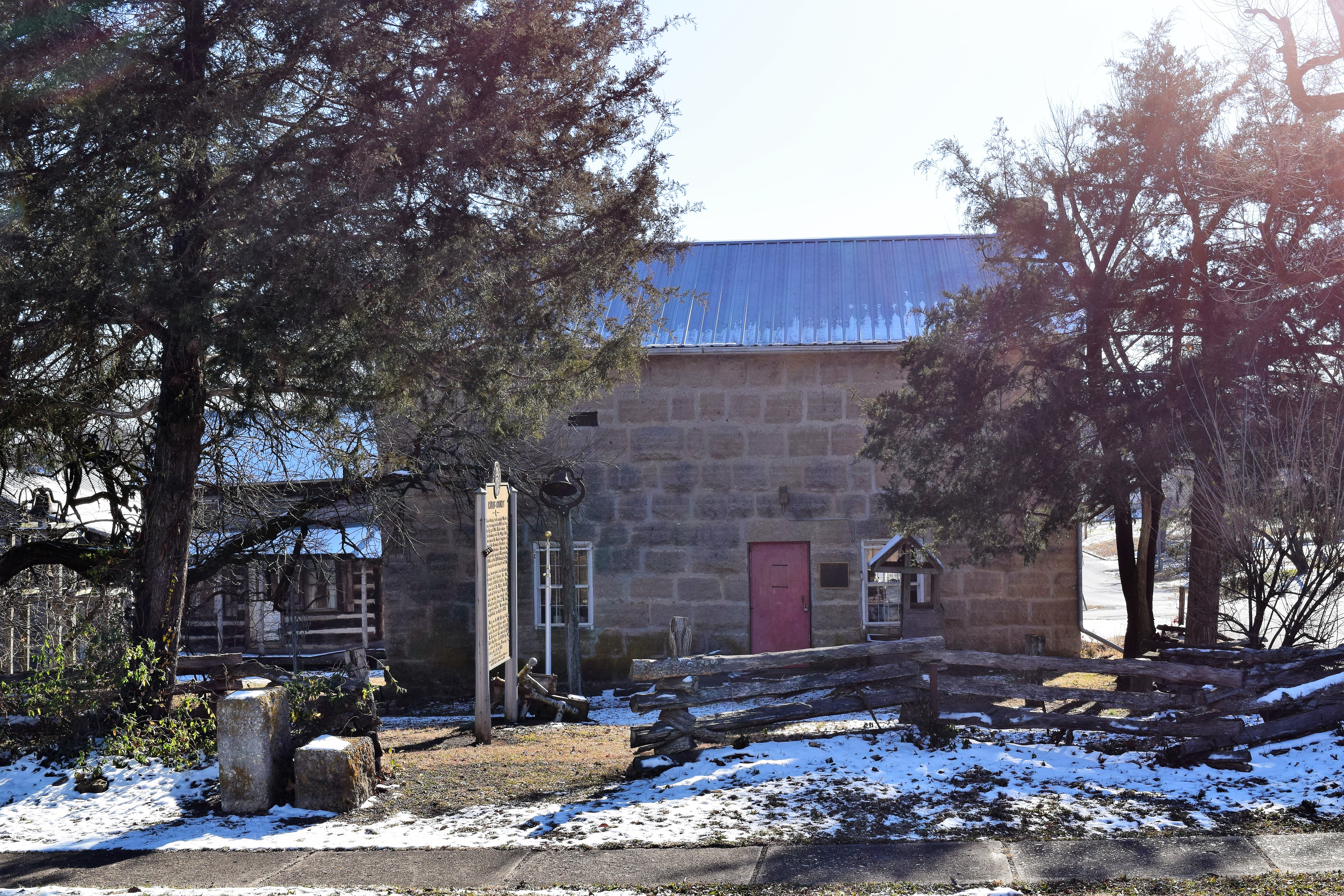

- Location within Missouri Location within the United States
- Location: Jct. of Fifth and Mill Sts., Vienna, Missouri
- Coordinates: 38°11′11″N 91°56′46″W
- Area: Less than one acre
- Built: 1856-1858
- Architect: Barnhart
- Architectural style: Mid 19th Century Jail
- NRHP reference No.: 02000101
- Added to NRHP: March 1, 2002

Maries County Jail and Sheriff's House, also known as the Old Jail Museum, is a historic jail and sheriff's residence located in Vienna, Maries County, Missouri. It was built between 1856 and 1858, and is a two-story rectangular building, constructed of rough-cut native limestone ashlar blocks. It was moved to its present location in 1959, where it is now used as a museum.

It was added to the National Register of Historic Places in 2002.
