= Stickney, Missouri =

Unincorporated community in Missouri, U.S.

Coordinates: 38°04′03″N 91°56′08″W

Stickney is an unincorporated community in southern Maries County, in the U.S. state of Missouri. The community is on Missouri Route E, two miles east of Hayden. The location is just west of the confluence of Dry Creek and Montague Creek and two miles west of the confluence of Dry Creek with the Gasconade River. The community is about eight miles south of Vienna.

== History ==
A post office called Stickney was established in 1903, and remained in operation until 1951. The community has the name of the local Stickney family.
