= Hayden, Missouri =

Unincorporated community in Missouri, U.S.

Coordinates: 38°04′30″N 91°58′37″W

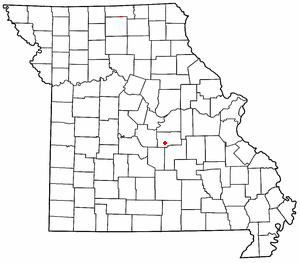

Hayden is an unincorporated community in southern Maries County, Missouri, United States. The community is located on Missouri Route E between Big Bend and Stickney. It is eight miles south of Vienna and approximately sixteen miles northwest of Rolla.

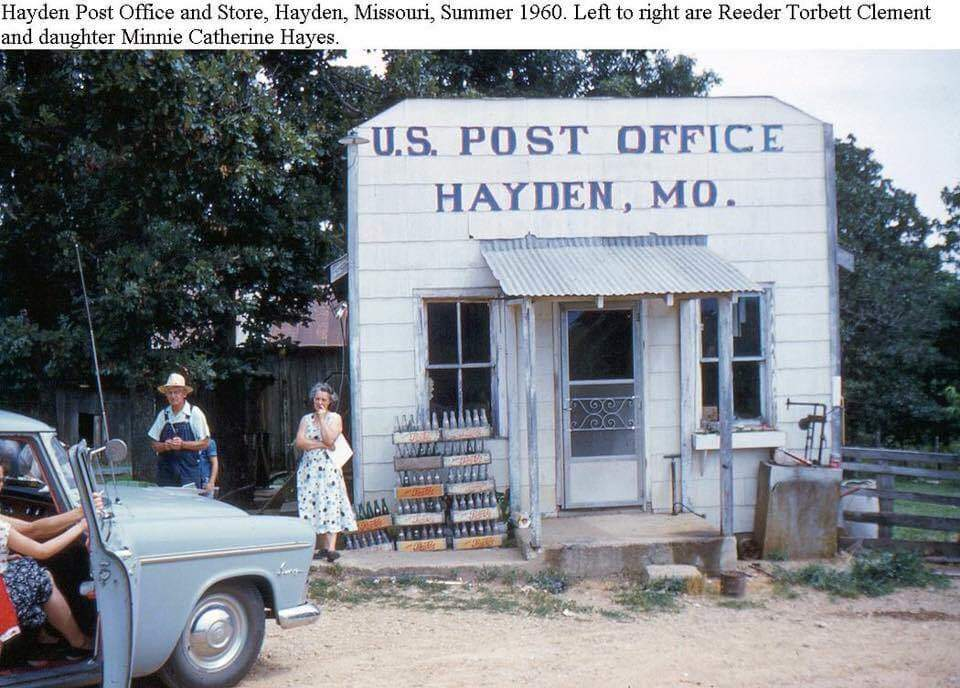
Hayden Post Office 1960

A post office called Hayden was established in 1890, and remained in operation until 1972. Hayden Copeland, an early postmaster, gave the community his first name.
