= Paydown, Missouri =

Unincorporated community in Missouri, U.S.

Coordinates: 38°13′44″N 91°48′14″W

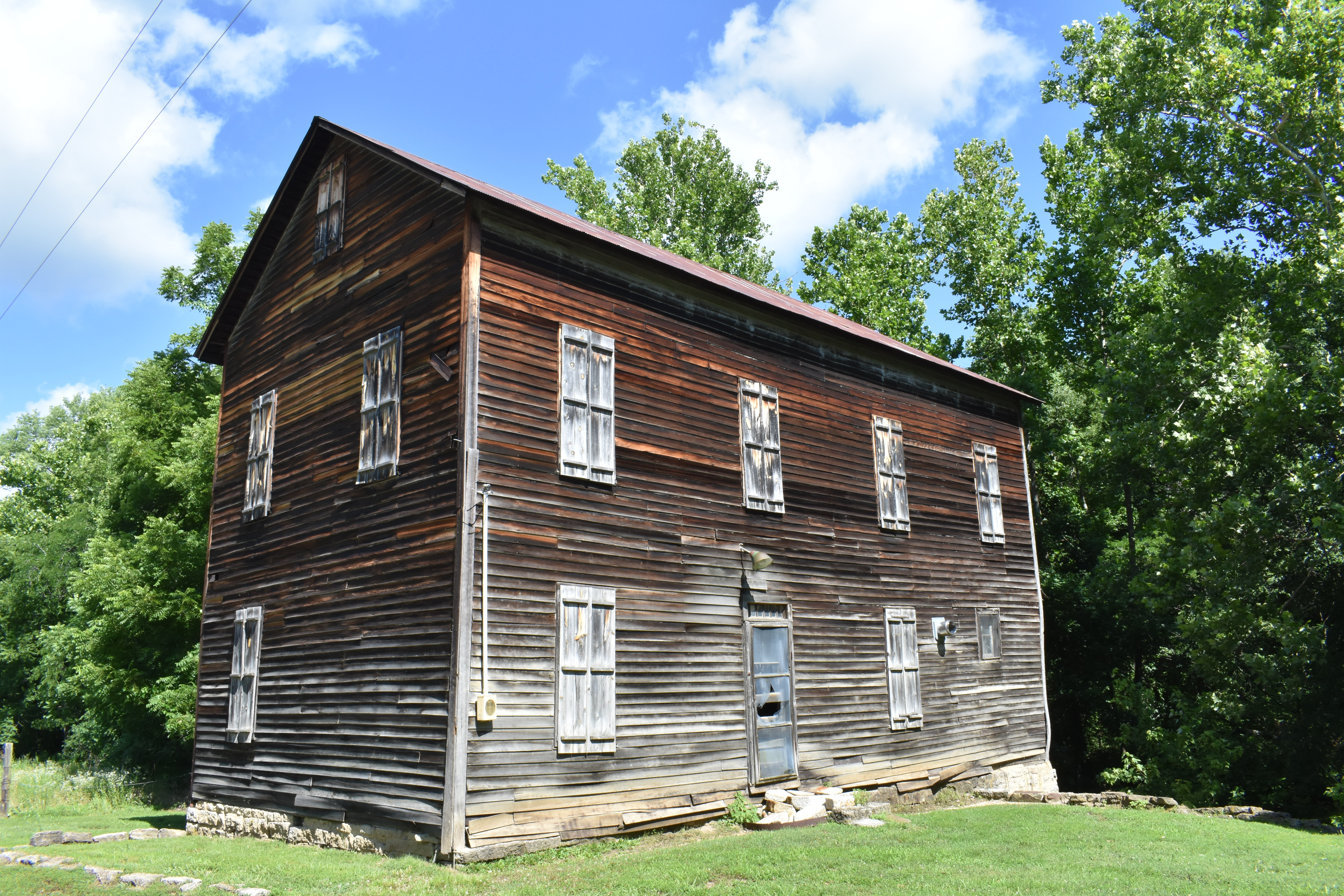
The old Paydown Grist Mill building, 7 miles outside Belle, Missouri. June 2026

Paydown is an unincorporated community in northeastern Maries County, Missouri, United States.

The community is located along Missouri Route N approximately 2.5 miles northeast of Bend and five miles southwest of Belle. The Gasconade River flows past one-half mile west of the community.

== History ==
Paydown got its start circa 1830 when a large gristmill was built there. According to tradition, the proprietor of the mill required all customers to "pay down" promptly, hence the name. A post office called Pay Down was in operation from 1856 until 1932.
