= Highgate (disambiguation) =

Highgate is a suburban area of north London, spanning the boroughs of Haringey, Camden and Islington.

Highgate or High Gate may also refer to:

== Australia ==
- Highgate, South Australia, a suburb of Adelaide
- Highgate, Western Australia, a suburb in Perth
- Highgate Hill, Queensland, a suburb in Brisbane

== Jamaica ==
- Highgate, Jamaica, a market town

== South Africa ==
- Highgate Village, a village (section) of Dainfern, Johannesburg

== United Kingdom ==
- Highgate (Camden ward), London
- Highgate (Haringey ward), London
- Highgate, Birmingham, an area to the south of Birmingham city centre, England
- Highgate, Hawkhurst, Kent, England
- Highgate, South Yorkshire, a local name for an area to the west of Goldthorpe, near Barnsley
- Highgate tube station, a London Underground station on the Northern Line, in Haringey
- Highgate, Walsall, situated 10 miles north of Birmingham, England

== United States ==
- High Gate, Missouri
- Highgate, Vermont
- High Gate, a historic house in West Virginia

== See also ==
- Highgate Park, a park in Highgate, Birmingham
- Highgate Park, the final name of the former Julia Farr Centre in Adelaide, South Australia
- Highgate School, an independent school in Highgate, London, England
