= Feuersville, Missouri =

Ghost town in Missouri, United States

Coordinates: 38.3936561°N 91.6748880°W

Feuersville is an extinct town in Osage County, in the U.S. state of Missouri.

A post office called Feuersville was established in 1879, and remained in operation until 1916. The community has the name of the local Feuers family.
