= Shawnee Creek =

Shawnee Creek may refer to:

- Shawnee Creek (Apple Creek), a stream in Missouri
- Shawnee Creek (Baileys Creek), a stream in Missouri
- Shawnee Creek (Texas), a stream in Texas
