= Babbtown, Missouri =

- Unincorporated community
- Location within Missouri Location within the United States
- Coordinates: 38°20′20″N 92°08′19″W
- Country: United States
- State: Missouri
- County: Osage
- Elevation: 912 ft (278 m)
- Time zone: UTC-6 (Central (CST))
  - Summer (DST): UTC-5 (CDT)
- ZIP Code: 65058
- Area code: 573
- GNIS feature ID: 740648

Babbtown is an unincorporated community in southwest Osage County, in the U.S. state of Missouri. The community is on route P, just east of Missouri Route 133. Meta is approximately 2.5 miles to the southwest. The headwaters of Little Maries Creek arise just southwest of the community.

== History ==
A post office called Babbtown was established in 1878, and remained in operation until 1906. The community has the name of one Mr. Babb, an early settler.
