= Lisletown, Missouri =

Ghost town in Missouri, United States

Coordinates: 38.4933723°N 92.0060117°W

Lisletown is an extinct town in Osage County, in the U.S. state of Missouri.

Variant names were "Lisle" and "Mariosa Delta". A post office called Lisle was established in 1842, and remained in operation until 1860. The community was named after Benjamin Lisle, a first settler. As of 2016, Mari Osa Delta Campground occupies the site.
