= Crook, Missouri =

Unincorporated community in Missouri, United States

Coordinates: 38°33′02″N 91°46′40″W

Crook is an unincorporated community in Osage County, in the U.S. state of Missouri.

== History ==
A post office called Crook was established in 1903, and remained in operation until 1920. The community was derisively named Crook (meaning "thief") on account of the business practices of a local merchant.
