= Missouri Route 28 =

State highway in Missouri, U.S.

Route 28

Route information
- Maintained by MoDOT
- Length: 70 mi (110 km)
- Existed: 1922–present

Major junctions
- West end: I-44 / Route Z near St. Robert
- US 63 from Vienna to Vichy
- East end: US 50 in Rosebud

Location
- Country: United States
- State: Missouri

Highway system
- Missouri State Highway System; Interstate; US; State; Supplemental
← Route 27	→ I-29

Route 28 is a highway in central Missouri. Its eastern terminus is at U.S. Route 50 in eastern Gasconade County; its western terminus is at Interstate 44 east of St. Robert. It is a medium length highway in the upper Ozarks in central Missouri generally northwest of Rolla.

== History ==
Route 28 was one of the original state highways and it has changed very little. Its termini are currently the same as they were in 1922.

== Route description ==
Missouri Route 28 begins at a junction with I-44 and Route Z east of St. Robert in Pulaski County. The highway heads easterly, passing through rolling terrain before reaching Dixon, where it intersects Route C, which provides access to Route 133 west of town. Continuing eastward, Route 28 enters Maries County, where it meets US 63 near Vienna. The highway runs concurrent with US 63 for a short distance, where it crosses the Gasconade River on the Roy Bassett Memorial Bridge, before separating and heading northeasterly toward Vichy.

Further along, Route 28 crosses the Dry Fork Creek, where a newly constructed bridge replaced an older structure that had been in service since 1929. The highway continues through rural landscapes, passing through the unincorporated community of Belle before reaching a junction with Route 89, which leads north toward Linn. Route 28 then passes through the far southeast corner of Osage County, before entering Gasconade County, where it reaches Owensville. Within Owensville, the highway intersects Route 19, forming a brief concurrency before separating again east of town. Leaving Owensville, Route 28 continues easterly through agricultural terrain, passing through the unincorporated community of Drake before reaching its eastern terminus at US 50 in Rosebud.

== Major intersections ==
County	Location	mi	km	Destinations	Notes
Pulaski	St. Robert			Route Z / Historic US 66	
Pulaski	St. Robert			I-44 – Springfield, Fort Leonard Wood, Rolla	I-44 exit 163
Pulaski	Dixon			Route C west to Route 133	
Maries				US 63 north – Vienna, Westphalia, Jefferson City	west end of US 63 overlap
Maries				US 63 south – Vichy, Rolla	east end of US 63 overlap
Maries				Route 42 west – Vienna	
Maries	Belle			Route 89 north – Linn, Chamois	
Osage	No major junctions				
Gasconade	Owensville			Route 19 south – Cuba	west end of Route 19 overlap
Gasconade				Route 19 north – Drake	east end of Route 19 overlap
Gasconade	Rosebud			US 50 – Jefferson City, St. Louis, Drake, Gerald	
1.000 mi = 1.609 km; 1.000 km = 0.621 mi
