= Freedom, Missouri =

Unincorporated community in Missouri, United States

Coordinates: 38°27′49″N 91°41′27″W

Freedom is an unincorporated community in Osage County, in the U.S. state of Missouri. The village lies on Missouri Route N, approximately one mile north of U.S. Route 50 and two miles north of the Gasconade River.

== History ==
A post office called Freedom was established in 1889, and remained in operation until 1957. The community was named after the American concept of freedom.
