= Brinktown, Missouri =

Unincorporated community in Maries County, Missouri, United States

Coordinates: 38°07′36″N 92°05′05″W

Brinktown is an unincorporated community in Maries County, Missouri, United States. It is located approximately eight miles southwest of Vienna on Route 133.

A variant name was Viessman. A post office called Viessmann was established in 1890, and the name was changed to Brinktown in 1903. According to tradition, one Mrs. Brink offered to contribute to the town's church in exchange for the renaming rights.
