= Missouri Route 134 =

State highway in Missouri, U.S.

Route 134
- MO 134 highlighted in red

Route information
- Maintained by MoDOT
- Length: 5.071 mi (8.161 km)

Major junctions
- South end: Lake of the Ozarks State Park
- North end: Route 42 near Osage Beach

Location
- Country: United States
- State: Missouri

Highway system
- Missouri State Highway System; Interstate; US; State; Supplemental
← Route 133	→ Route 135

Route 134 is a short highway in the Lake of the Ozarks area of Missouri. Its southern terminus is in Lake of the Ozarks State Park; its northern terminus is at Route 42 near Osage Beach.

== Major intersections ==
County	Location	mi	km	Destinations	Notes
Camden	Lake of the Ozarks State Park	0.00	0.00	Park entrance	
Miller	No major junctions				
Camden	No major junctions				
Miller	Glaze Township	5.071	8.161	Route 42 – Osage Beach, Brumley	
1.000 mi = 1.609 km; 1.000 km = 0.621 mi
