= Hope, Missouri =

Unincorporated community in Missouri, United States

Coordinates: 38°31′42″N 91°40′17″W

Hope is an unincorporated community in Osage County, in the U.S. state of Missouri.

== History ==
A post office called Hope was established in 1897, and remained in operation until 1974. The community most likely was named for the attitude of hope.
