= Boone Township, Maries County, Missouri =

Inactive township in the US state of Missouri

Coordinates: 38.2367°N 92.1083°W

Boone Township is an inactive township in Maries County, in the U.S. state of Missouri.

Boone Township has the name of Nathaniel Boone, a pioneer citizen.
