= Deer, Missouri =

Unincorporated community in Missouri, United States

Coordinates: 38°37′19″N 91°47′49″W

Deer is an unincorporated community in Osage County, in the U.S. state of Missouri.

== History ==
A post office called Deer was established in 1901, and remained in operation until 1932. The community most likely was so named on account of deer in the area.
