= Sudheimer, Missouri =

Unincorporated community in Missouri, U.S.

Coordinates: 38°07′59″N 92°10′44″W

Sudheimer is an unincorporated community in Maries County, in the U.S. state of Missouri.

== History ==
A post office called Sudheimer was established in 1905, and remained in operation until 1936. The community has the name of the local Sudheimer family.
