= Summerfield, Missouri =

Unincorporated community in Missouri, U.S.

Coordinates: 38°17′01″N 91°48′18″W

Summerfield is an unincorporated community in Maries County, in the U.S. state of Missouri.

== History ==
A post office called Summerfield was established in 1903, and remained in operation until 1957. The name is commendatory.
