= Safe, Missouri =

Unincorporated community in the U.S. state of Missouri

Coordinates: 38°05′18″N 91°39′08″W

Safe is an unincorporated community in southeastern Maries County, in the U.S. state of Missouri. The community is located on Missouri Route H on a hill just west of and above the Bourbeuse River. The community is approximately six miles north-northeast of St. James.

== History ==
A post office called Safe was established in 1886, and remained in operation until 1958. According to one tradition, the community was named for the generosity of the proprietor of a local gristmill who allowed safekeeping of customer's grain. Another tradition maintains the name is an acronym of the surnames of four first settlers, namely Shinkle, Aufderheide, Copeland, Fann, and Essman.
