= Cooper Hill, Missouri =

Unincorporated community in Missouri, United States

Coordinates: 38°25′38″N 91°39′42″W

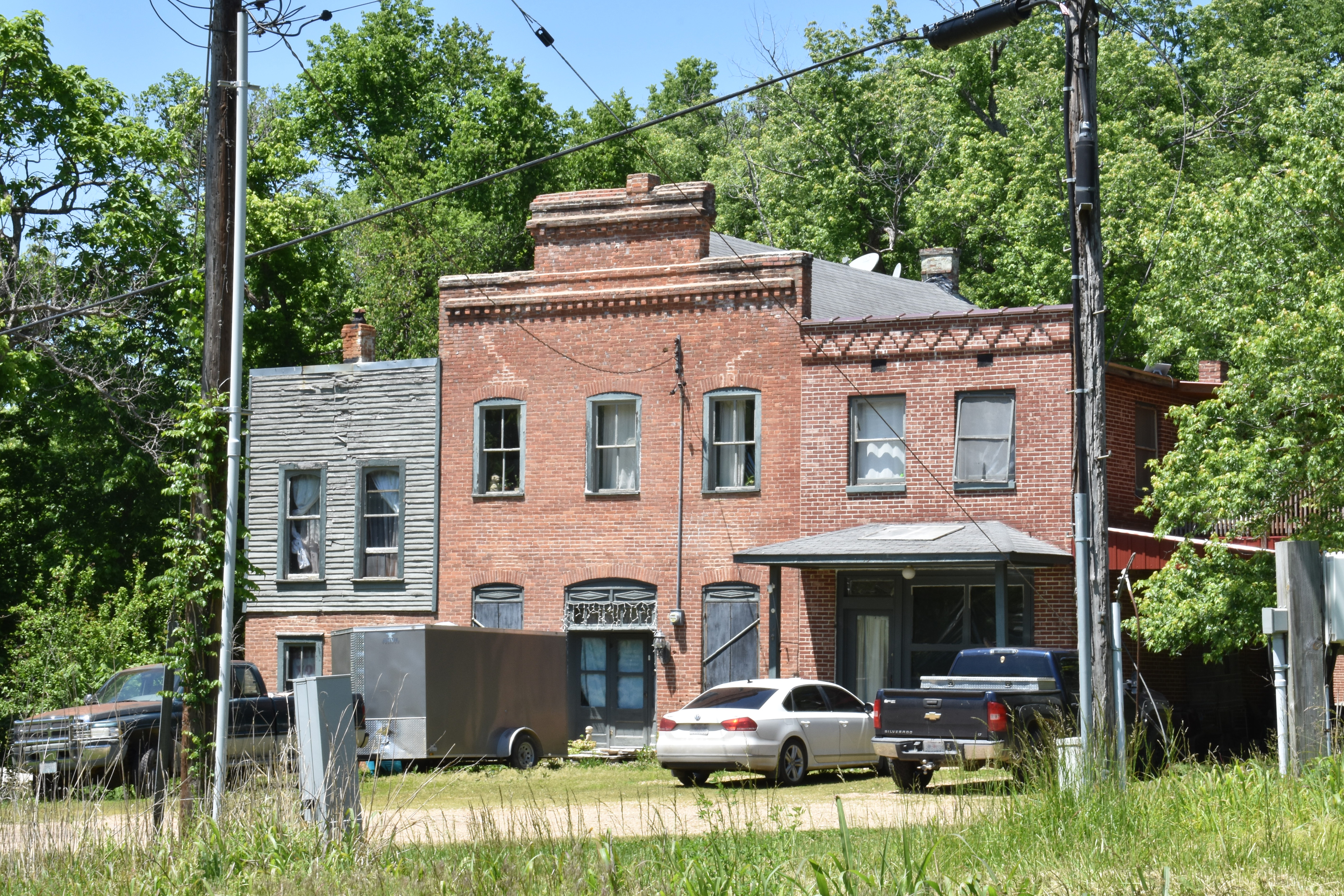
The Langenberg Grocery store and former post office building in Cooper Hill.

Cooper Hill is an unincorporated community in Osage County, in the U.S. state of Missouri.

== History ==
A post office called Cooper's Hill was established in 1860, the name was changed to Cooper Hill in 1893, and the post office closed in 1957. The community has the name of J. M. Cooper, an early settler.
