= Folk, Missouri =

Unincorporated community in Missouri, United States

Folk
- unincorporated community
- Location within Missouri
- Coordinates: 38°25′18.83″N 92°5′49.4″W
- Country: United States
- State: Missouri
- County: Osage
- Established: 1905

Folk is an unincorporated community in northwestern Osage County, Missouri, United States. It is located approximately ten miles southeast of Jefferson City.

It is on county road 505 one-quarter mile west of Route 133 and approximately five miles west of Westphalia. The Osage River flows past one mile west of the site.

A post office called Folk was established in 1905, and remained in operation until 1964. The community was named for former governor Joseph W. Folk.
