= Judge, Missouri =

Unincorporated community in Missouri, United States

Coordinates: 38°25′14″N 91°46′51″W

Judge is an unincorporated community in Osage County, in the U.S. state of Missouri.

== History ==
A post office called Judge was established in 1914, and remained in operation until 1922. The community was named for the fact A. J. Branson, a local judge, was the original owner of the town site.
