= Koenig, Missouri =

Unincorporated community in Missouri, United States

Coordinates: 38°21′22″N 91°46′06″W

Koenig is an unincorporated community in Osage County, in the U.S. state of Missouri.

== History ==
A post office called Koenig was established in 1892, and remained in operation until 1920. The community was named after early postmaster Henry G. King (King is "Koenig" in German).
