= Freeburg Tunnel =

Tunnel in Missouri, U.S.

- Interactive map of Freeburg Tunnel

Overview
- Location: Beneath the city of Freeburg, Missouri
- Coordinates: 38.3169°N 91.9233°W
- System: Formerly the Rock Island railroad

Operation
- Work began: 1901
- Opened: 1903
- Closed: 1980

Technical
- Length: 700 ft (210 m)
- No. of tracks: Single

The Freeburg Tunnel is a railway tunnel in Missouri. Construction on what was then the St. Louis, Kansas City and Colorado Railroad began in 1901. It was completed in 1903 by the Chicago, Rock Island and Pacific Railroad, and abandoned in 1980. The tunnel is one of four on the Kansas City–St. Louis Missouri line.

On June 7, 1917, westbound Rock Island passenger train number 23 collided head-on with a freight train at the tunnel, killing the engineer of No. 23, and injuring several others.

In 1963 the floor of the tunnel was lowered by 8 to 10 inches (200 to 250 mm) to allow it to accommodate autoracks. This work was completed in early July 1963.

The tunnel is owned by Ameren, who was working in 2016 with the State of Missouri to convert the line to a rail trail connected on the west end to Rock Island Trail State Park.
