= Lindell, Missouri =

Unincorporated community in Missouri, U.S.

Coordinates: 38°10′15″N 91°47′31″W

Lindell is an unincorporated community in Maries County, in the U.S. state of Missouri.

== History ==
A post office called Lindell was established in 1884, and remained in operation until 1919. The community took its name from the Lindell Dry Goods Company, a company with which an early settler had business contacts.
