= High Gate, Missouri =

Unincorporated community in Missouri

Coordinates: 38°09′28″N 91°40′30″W

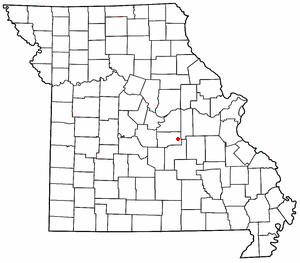

High Gate is an unincorporated community in eastern Maries County, Missouri, United States. It is at the intersection of routes H and U approximately fourteen miles east of Vienna and 1.5 miles from the Maries-Gasconade county line.

A post office called High Gate was established in 1877, and remained in operation until 1971. The community was named after Highgate, London, the native home of an early settler.
