= Aud, Missouri =

- Unincorporated community
- Location within Missouri Location within the United States
- Coordinates: 38°34′49″N 91°43′15″W
- Country: United States
- State: Missouri
- County: Osage
- Elevation: 660 ft (200 m)
- Time zone: UTC-6 (Central (CST))
  - Summer (DST): UTC-5 (CDT)
- ZIP Code: 65024
- Area code: 573
- GNIS feature ID: 740644

Aud is an unincorporated community in Osage County, in the U.S. state of Missouri.

== History ==
A post office called Aud was established in 1889, and remained in operation until 1954. The community has the name of Joseph Aud, the original owner of the town site.
