= Crawford Township, Osage County, Missouri =

Inactive township in the US state of Missouri

Coordinates: 38.4849858°N 91.7612048°W

Crawford Township is an inactive township in Osage County, in the U.S. state of Missouri.

Crawford Township was erected in 1841.
