= Van Cleve, Missouri =

Unincorporated community in Missouri, U.S.

Coordinates: 38°14′06″N 92°09′27″W

Van Cleve is an unincorporated community in Maries County, in the U.S. state of Missouri. The original Van Cleve was located on Road 222 and was platted as a town-later the post office and town's name moved 1/4 mile past Carnes Branch off of hwy 133

== History ==
A post office called Vancleve was established in 1880, and remained in operation until 1930. The community was named after a local politician.
