= Light, Missouri =

Unincorporated community in Missouri, U.S.

Coordinates: 38.0605983°N 91.7337704°W

Light is an unincorporated community in Maries County, in the U.S. state of Missouri.

== History ==
A post office called Light was established in 1894, and remained in operation until 1923. Klabe Light, an early postmaster, gave the community his last name.
