= Tavern, Missouri =

Unincorporated community in Missouri, U.S.

Coordinates: 38°09′45″N 92°07′47″W

Tavern is an unincorporated community in Maries County, in the U.S. state of Missouri.

== History ==
A post office called Tavern was established in 1879, and remained in operation until 1933. A variant name was "Humphreys". Besides the post office, the community had Humphrey's country store.
