= Byron, Missouri =

Unincorporated community in Missouri, United States

Coordinates: 38°20′07″N 91°42′39″W

Byron is an unincorporated community in Osage County, in the U.S. state of Missouri.

== History ==
A post office called Byron was established in 1864, and remained in operation until 1920. The community was named after Lord Byron, according to local history.
