= Missouri Route 89 =

State highway in Missouri, U.S.

Route 89
- MO 89; mainline in red, spur route in blue

Route information
- Maintained by MoDOT
- Length: 38.737 mi (62.341 km)

Major junctions
- South end: Route 28 in Belle
- US 50 in Linn
- North end: Route 100 in Chamois

Location
- Country: United States
- State: Missouri

Highway system
- Missouri State Highway System; Interstate; US; State; Supplemental
← Route 88	→ Route 90

Route 89 is a highway in central Missouri. Its northern terminus is at Route 100 in Chamois; its southern terminus is at Route 28 in Belle. A short spur of Highway 89 connects with east U.S. Route 50 east of Linn.

== Route description ==
Route 89 starts at an intersection with Route 100. Shortly after, it intersects with Route K. Then as it goes south, it intersects with Route FF. Then it intersects with Route HH. Further south it intersects with Route J. Then it branches off a spur route of Route 89. Further south, it intersects with US 50. US 50 is shared with Route 89 until an intersection in Linn. Then it continues south and then it intersects with Route E. Several miles south it intersects with Route D. Then it intersects with Route Y outside of Belle. Shortly after, it crosses over into Maries County and ends at an intersection with Route 28 in Belle.

== History ==
Route 89 had originally been part of Route 12B, a branch of Route 12, one of the original 1922 state highways.

== Major intersections ==
County	Location	mi	km	Destinations	Notes
Maries	Belle	0.000	0.000	Route 28	
Maries	Belle	0.190	0.306	Route M (Third Street)	
Osage	Jefferson Township	1.195	1.923	Route Y	
Osage	Jefferson Township	4.736	7.622	Route D	
Osage	Crawford Township	10.605	17.067	Route E	
Osage	Linn	17.259	27.776	US 50 west (Main Street)	South end of US 50 overlap
Osage	Crawford Township	18.683	30.067	Route CC	
Osage	Crawford Township	20.604	33.159	US 50 east	North end of US 50 overlap
Osage	Crawford Township	22.385	36.025	Route 89 Spur to US 50	
Osage	Crawford Township	25.087	40.374	Route J	
Osage	Crawford Township	27.285	43.911	Route HH	
Osage	Benton Township	35.377	56.934	Route FF	
Osage	Chamois	38.431	61.849	Route K (3rd Street)	
Osage	Chamois	38.737	62.341	Route 100 (Missouri Avenue)	
1.000 mi = 1.609 km; 1.000 km = 0.621 mi: Concurrency terminus

== Route 89 Spur ==
Route 89 Spur
- Route 89Y
- Location: Osage County
- Length: 1.627 mi (2.618 km)

Route 89 Spur/Route 89Y is a 1.6-mile-long (2.6 km) highway that forms the eastern leg of a Y intersection between Route 89 and US 50 in Osage County. Southbound Route 89 travelers wishing to connect to eastbound US 50 can save nearly two miles (3.2 km) of travel by utilizing Route 89 Spur rather than making a direct connection between the two highways at Potts.
