= Mint Hill, Missouri =

- Unincorporated community
- Location within Missouri Location within the United States
- Coordinates: 38°32′57″N 91°44′50″W
- Country: United States
- State: Missouri
- County: Osage
- Elevation: 928 ft (283 m)
- Time zone: UTC-6 (Central (CST))
  - Summer (DST): UTC-5 (CDT)
- ZIP Code: 65051
- Area code: 573
- GNIS feature ID: 741075

Mint Hill is an unincorporated community in Osage County, in the U.S. state of Missouri.

== History ==
A post office called Mint Hill was in operation from 1870 until 1954. The community was named for the wild mint near the elevated town site.
