= Venus, Missouri =

Unincorporated community in Missouri, U.S.

Coordinates: 38°10′49″N 92°02′03″W

Venus is an unincorporated community in Maries County, in the U.S. state of Missouri.

== History ==
A post office called Venus was established in 1912, and remained in operation until 1932. The community has the name of Venus Riley, a young citizen.
