= Potts, Missouri =

Unincorporated community in Missouri, United States

Coordinates: 38°28′27″N 91°47′02″W

Potts is an unincorporated community in Osage County, in the U.S. state of Missouri. Potts is located on U.S. Route 50 between Linn to the west and Mount Sterling to the east, in Gasconade County.

== History ==
A post office called Potts was established in 1905, and remained in operation until 1920. The community has the name of the local Potts family.
