= Koeltztown, Missouri =

Unincorporated community in Missouri, United States

Coordinates: 38°19′29″N 92°02′32″W

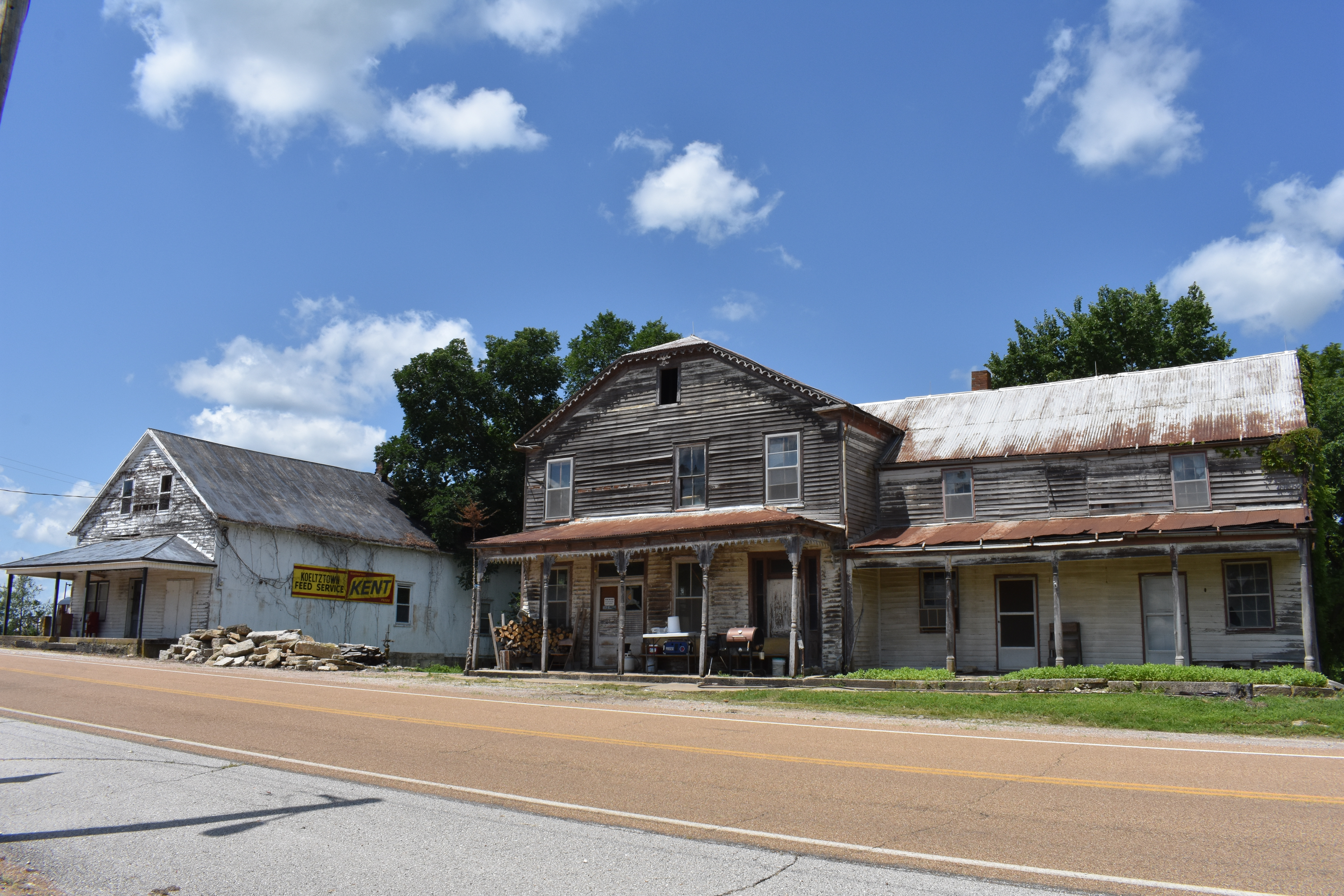
Koeltztown, Missouri in June 2026.

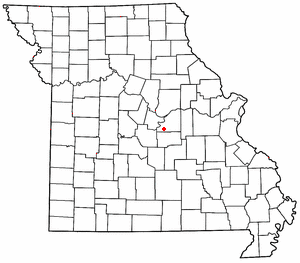

Koeltztown (KELTS'-town) is an unincorporated community in southern Osage County, Missouri, United States. It is located approximately seventeen miles southeast of Jefferson City and is one of the oldest settlements in Osage County. Founded in 1858, the community was named after its first postmaster, August Koeltze. While not Catholic, Koeltz donated land for a Catholic parish to encourage enough settlers to the area to establish a town around St. Boniface Catholic Church. A post office called Koeltztown has been in operation since 1862.

During the American Civil War, a few raiders passed through, but there were no major battles in the area. Most European settlers were German immigrants, who arrived in greatest number from the mid- to late-19th century.
