= Vichy, Missouri =

Unincorporated community in Missouri, U.S.

Coordinates: 38°06′41″N 91°45′38″W

Vichy in October 2026

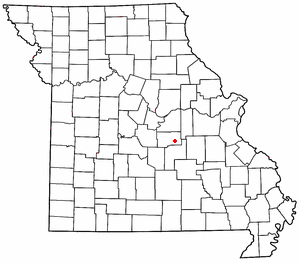

Vichy (/ˈvʌʃi/ VUSH-ee) is an unincorporated community in southern Maries County, Missouri, United States. It is located on U.S. Route 63, approximately 10 miles north of Rolla. The community was founded in 1880 and is named after Vichy, France. A post office called Vichy has been in operation since 1880. The Rolla National Airport, a former U.S. Army airfield owned and operated by the City of Rolla, with two 5,500 ft (1,700 m) asphalt runways, is located nearby. The ZIP Code for Vichy is 65580.

== Climate ==
According to the Köppen Climate Classification system, Vichy has a humid subtropical climate, abbreviated "Cfa" on climate maps. The hottest temperature recorded in Vichy was 113 °F (45.0 °C) on July 18, 1954, while the coldest temperature recorded was −29 °F (−33.9 °C) on February 12, 1899.

Climate data for Vichy, Missouri (Rolla National Airport), 1991–2020 normals, extremes 1897–present
Month	Jan	Feb	Mar	Apr	May	Jun	Jul	Aug	Sep	Oct	Nov	Dec	Year
Record high °F (°C)	76 (24)	82 (28)	91 (33)	94 (34)	98 (37)	106 (41)	113 (45)	107 (42)	105 (41)	95 (35)	85 (29)	77 (25)	113 (45)
Mean maximum °F (°C)	65.1 (18.4)	70.4 (21.3)	78.4 (25.8)	84.3 (29.1)	87.5 (30.8)	91.9 (33.3)	97.2 (36.2)	97.2 (36.2)	91.3 (32.9)	84.3 (29.1)	74.6 (23.7)	66.4 (19.1)	98.9 (37.2)
Mean daily maximum °F (°C)	40.8 (4.9)	45.9 (7.7)	56.3 (13.5)	67.0 (19.4)	74.9 (23.8)	83.1 (28.4)	87.9 (31.1)	87.0 (30.6)	79.1 (26.2)	67.8 (19.9)	54.9 (12.7)	44.3 (6.8)	65.7 (18.7)
Daily mean °F (°C)	31.6 (−0.2)	36.1 (2.3)	45.6 (7.6)	55.8 (13.2)	64.7 (18.2)	73.1 (22.8)	77.4 (25.2)	76.3 (24.6)	68.3 (20.2)	57.1 (13.9)	45.1 (7.3)	35.4 (1.9)	55.5 (13.1)
Mean daily minimum °F (°C)	22.4 (−5.3)	26.3 (−3.2)	34.9 (1.6)	44.6 (7.0)	54.4 (12.4)	63.2 (17.3)	67.0 (19.4)	65.6 (18.7)	57.5 (14.2)	46.4 (8.0)	35.2 (1.8)	26.6 (−3.0)	45.3 (7.4)
Mean minimum °F (°C)	0.6 (−17.4)	6.0 (−14.4)	14.5 (−9.7)	28.1 (−2.2)	38.1 (3.4)	50.7 (10.4)	56.5 (13.6)	54.9 (12.7)	42.0 (5.6)	28.8 (−1.8)	17.6 (−8.0)	7.5 (−13.6)	−2.7 (−19.3)
Record low °F (°C)	−16 (−27)	−29 (−34)	−7 (−22)	17 (−8)	25 (−4)	39 (4)	46 (8)	45 (7)	31 (−1)	20 (−7)	3 (−16)	−25 (−32)	−29 (−34)
Average precipitation inches (mm)	2.22 (56)	2.06 (52)	3.40 (86)	4.71 (120)	5.35 (136)	4.46 (113)	4.43 (113)	3.66 (93)	3.81 (97)	3.21 (82)	3.45 (88)	2.31 (59)	43.07 (1,095)
Average precipitation days (≥ 0.01 in)	8.0	7.9	11.0	11.4	12.8	10.5	9.1	8.7	8.0	8.7	8.0	7.2	111.3
Source 1: NOAA
Source 2: National Weather Service
