= Meta, Missouri =

- City
- City of Meta
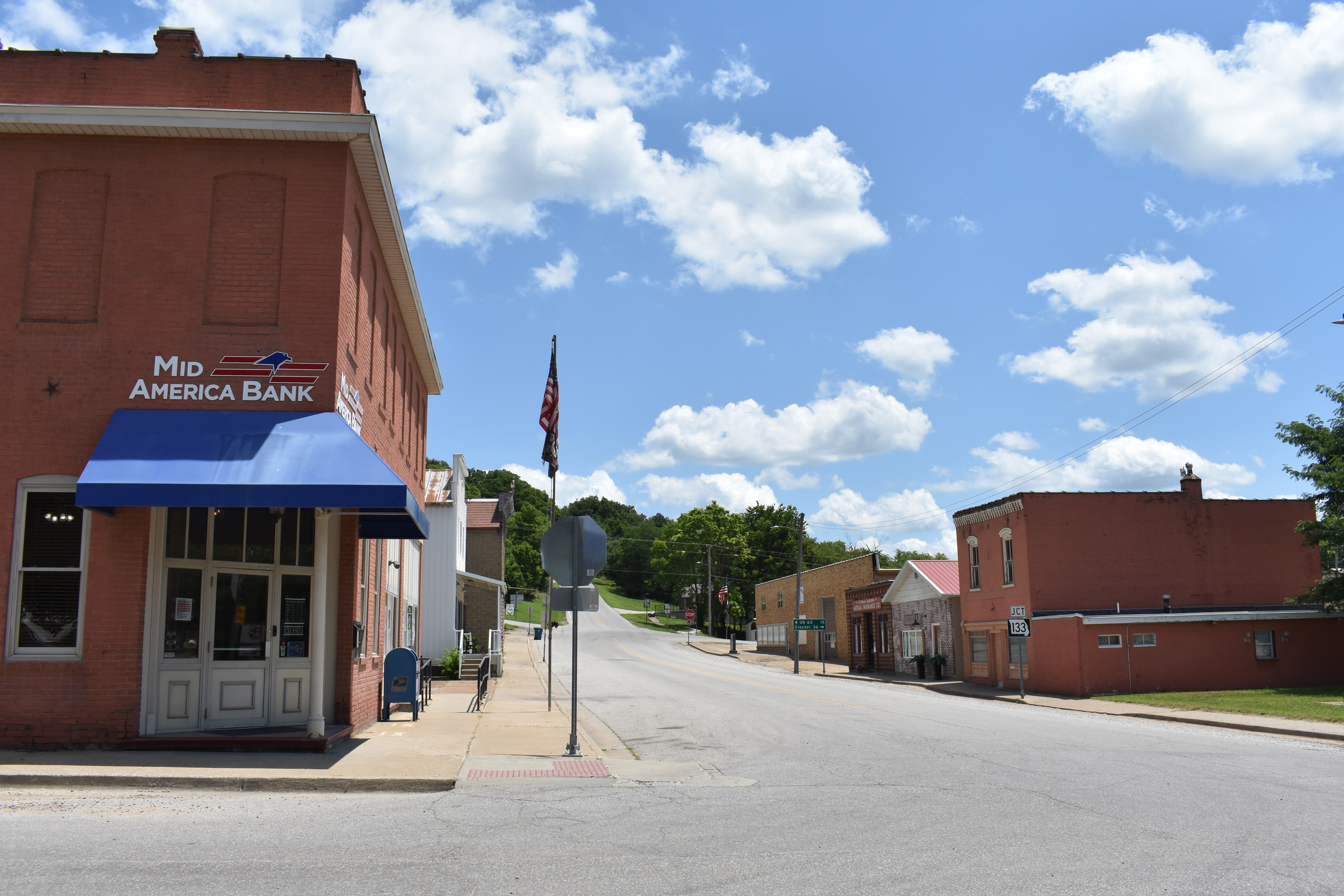
- Meta in June 2026

- Location of Meta, Missouri
- Coordinates: 38°18′44″N 92°09′56″W
- Country: United States
- State: Missouri
- County: Osage
- Founded: 1902
- Named for: Meta Schreifer

Government
  - Mayor: Emily Sommerer
  - City Clerk: Deidra Buechter

Area
  - Total: 0.34 sq mi (0.89 km^{2})
  - Land: 0.34 sq mi (0.89 km^{2})
  - Water: 0 sq mi (0.00 km^{2})
- Elevation: 637 ft (194 m)

Population (2020)
  - Total: 180
  - Density: 521.0/sq mi (201.15/km^{2})
- Time zone: UTC-6 (Central (CST))
  - Summer (DST): UTC-5 (CDT)
- ZIP code: 65058
- Area code: 573
- FIPS code: 29-47594
- GNIS feature ID: 2395105
- Website: cityofmetamo.com

Meta (/ˈmiːtə/ MEE-tə) is a city in Osage County, Missouri, United States. The population was 180 at the 2020 census. It is part of the Jefferson City, Missouri Metropolitan Statistical Area and is also the world headquarters of Diamond Pet Foods.

== Geography ==
Meta is located in the southwestern corner of Osage County at the intersection of Missouri routes 133 and B, on the north bank of Sugar Creek, approximately 3.5 miles southeast of that stream's confluence with the Osage River.

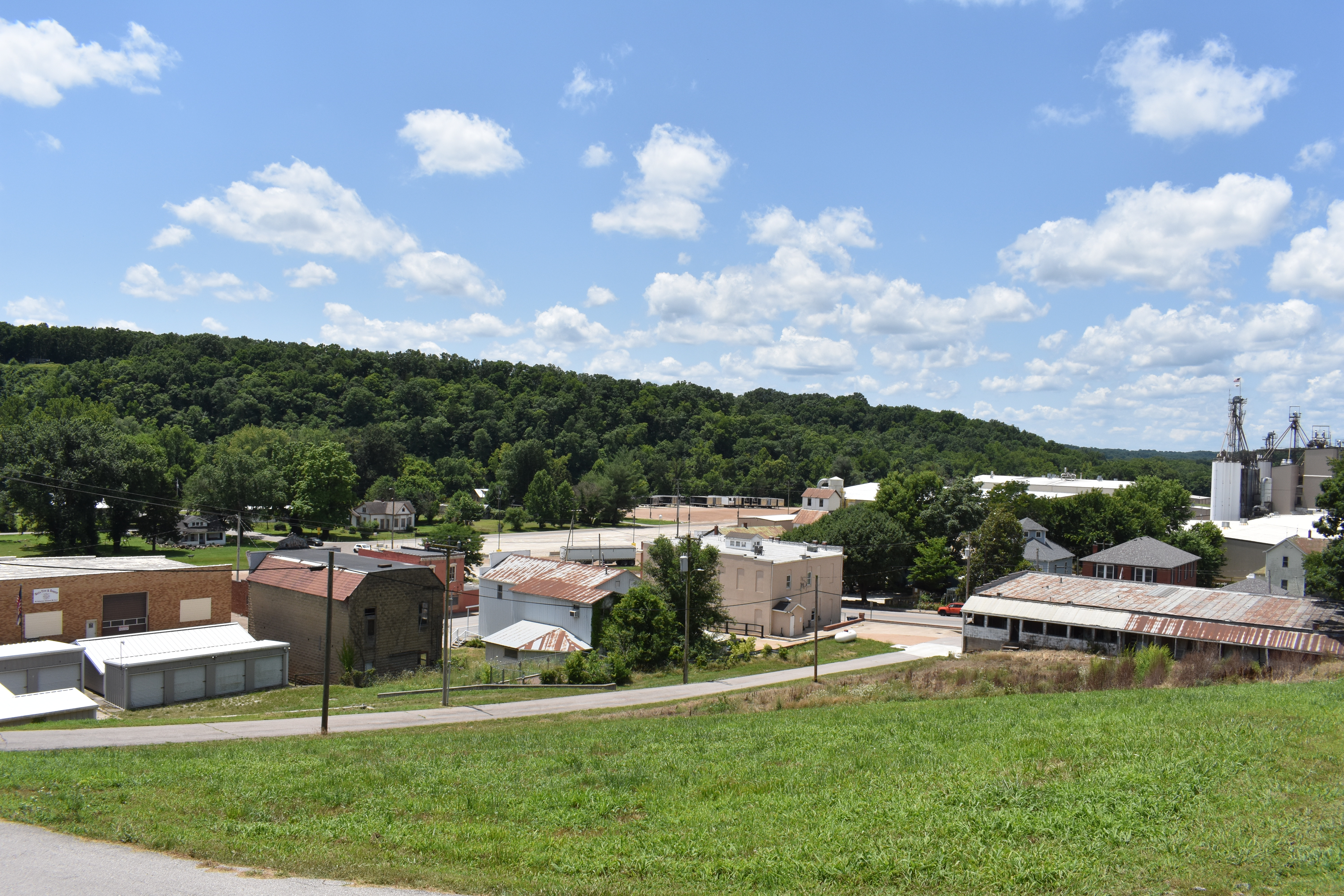
Meta, Missouri seen from above, at the intersection of 4th and Locust.

According to the United States Census Bureau, the city has a total area of 0.35 square miles (0.91 km^{2}), all land.

== Demographics ==
Historical population
Census	Pop.	Note	%±
1910	399		—
1920	426		6.8%
1930	422		−0.9%
1940	381		−9.7%
1950	353		−7.3%
1960	360		2.0%
1970	387		7.5%
1980	336		−13.2%
1990	249		−25.9%
2000	249		0.0%
2010	229		−8.0%
2020	180		−21.4%
U.S. Decennial Census

=== 2010 census ===
As of the census of 2010, there were 229 people, 96 households, and 57 families living in the city. The population density was 654.3 inhabitants per square mile (252.6/km^{2}). There were 115 housing units at an average density of 328.6 per square mile (126.9/km^{2}). The racial makeup of the city was 97.8% White and 2.2% from two or more races. Hispanic or Latino of any race were 0.4% of the population.

There were 96 households, of which 32.3% had children under the age of 18 living with them, 44.8% were married couples living together, 10.4% had a female householder with no husband present, 4.2% had a male householder with no wife present, and 40.6% were non-families. 36.5% of all households were made up of individuals, and 12.5% had someone living alone who was 65 years of age or older. The average household size was 2.34 and the average family size was 3.07.

The median age in the city was 35.5 years. 24.9% of residents were under the age of 18; 10.4% were between the ages of 18 and 24; 25.4% were from 25 to 44; 27.1% were from 45 to 64; and 12.2% were 65 years of age or older. The gender makeup of the city was 52.8% male and 47.2% female.

=== 2000 census ===
As of the census of 2000, there were 249 people, 106 households, and 59 families living in the city. The population density was 742.7 inhabitants per square mile (286.8/km^{2}). There were 130 housing units at an average density of 387.8 per square mile (149.7/km^{2}). The racial makeup of the city was 97.99% White, 1.20% Native American, and 0.80% from two or more races. Hispanic or Latino of any race were 1.20% of the population.

There were 106 households, out of which 30.2% had children under the age of 18 living with them, 50.9% were married couples living together, 3.8% had a female householder with no husband present, and 43.4% were non-families. 41.5% of all households were made up of individuals, and 25.5% had someone living alone who was 65 years of age or older. The average household size was 2.35 and the average family size was 3.32.

In the city, the population was spread out, with 27.7% under the age of 18, 6.8% from 18 to 24, 30.1% from 25 to 44, 17.3% from 45 to 64, and 18.1% who were 65 years of age or older. The median age was 37 years. For every 100 females, there were 102.4 males. For every 100 females age 18 and over, there were 100.0 males.

As of 2000 the median income for a household was $35,208, and the median income for a family was $43,750. Males had a median income of $26,875 versus $24,063 for females. The per capita income for the city was $13,902. About 9.1% of families and 16.7% of the population were below the poverty line, including 25.7% of those under the age of eighteen and 9.3% of those 65 or over.

== History ==
A post office called Meta has been in operation since 1903. The community was named after Meta Schreifer, the sister of a railroad official.

== Education ==
It is in the Osage County R-III School District.
