= Maries County, Missouri =

County in Missouri, United States

- County
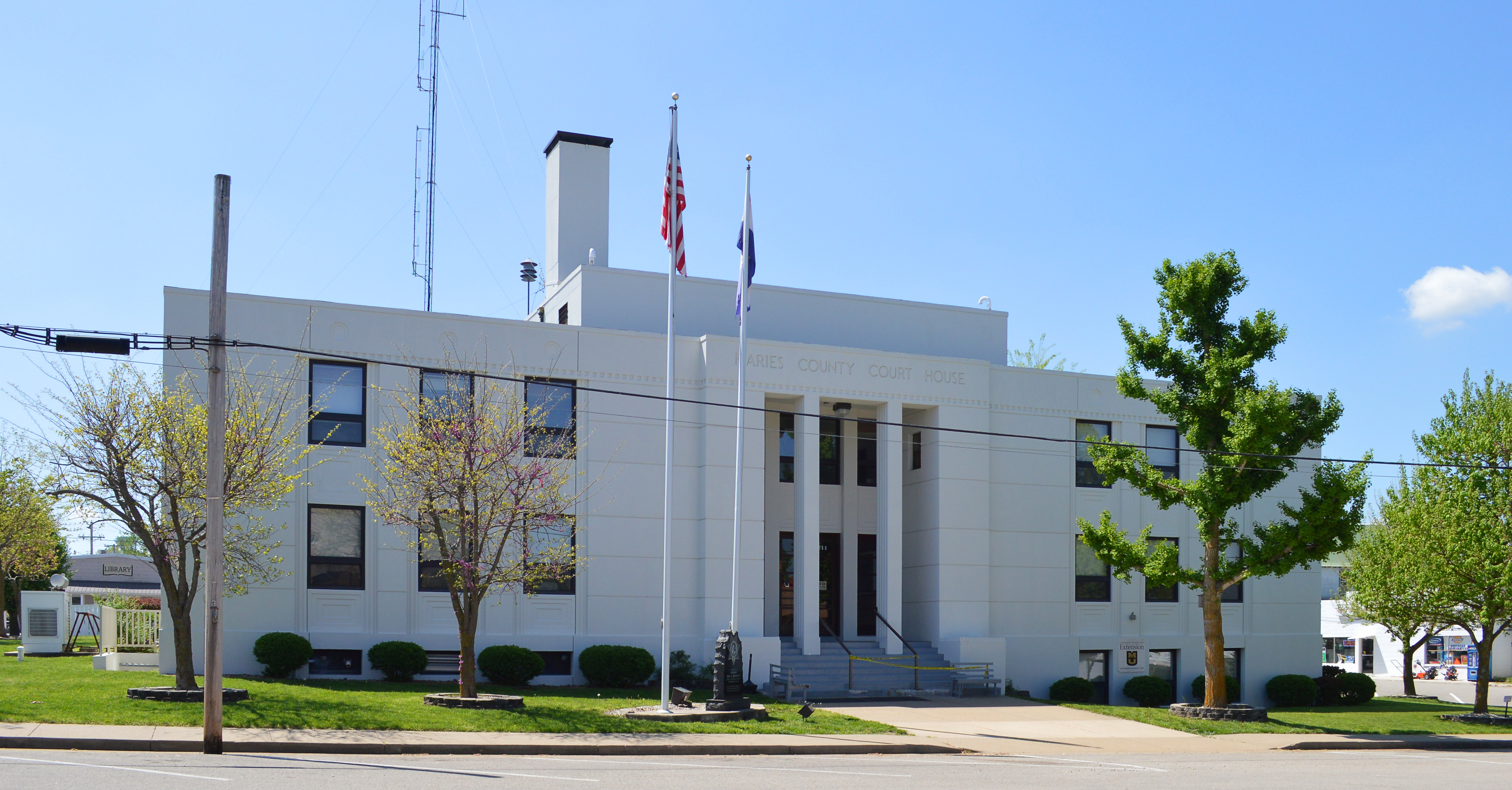
- Maries County Courthouse

- Location within the U.S. state of Missouri
- Coordinates: 38°11′N 91°55′W
- Country: United States
- State: Missouri
- Founded: March 2, 1855
- Named for: The Maries River and Little Maries River
- Seat: Vienna
- Largest city: Belle

Area
  - Total: 530 sq mi (1,400 km^{2})
  - Land: 527 sq mi (1,360 km^{2})
  - Water: 2.9 sq mi (7.5 km^{2}) 0.6%

Population (2020)
  - Total: 8,432
  - Estimate (2025): 8,397 ▼
  - Density: 16.0/sq mi (6.18/km^{2})
- Time zone: UTC−6 (Central)
  - Summer (DST): UTC−5 (CDT)
- Congressional district: 3rd
- Website: www.mariescountymo.gov

Maries County (/ˈmɛərɪz/ MAIR-iz) is a county located in the U.S. state of Missouri. As of the 2020 census, its population was 8,432. Its county seat is Vienna. The county was organized March 2, 1855, and named for the Maries River and Little Maries River. The word "Maries" is derived from the French word marais, which means "marsh, lake, or pond".

== Geography ==
According to the U.S. Census Bureau, the county has a total area of 530 square miles (1,400 km^{2}), of which 527 square miles (1,360 km^{2}) is land and 2.9 square miles (7.5 km^{2}) (0.6%) is water.

=== Adjacent counties ===
- Osage County (north)
- Gasconade County (northeast)
- Phelps County (southeast)
- Pulaski County (southwest)
- Miller County (west)

=== Major highways ===
- U.S. Route 63
- Route 28
- Route 42
- Route 52
- Route 68
- Route 133

== Demographics ==
Historical population
Census	Pop.	Note	%±
1860	4,901		—
1870	5,916		20.7%
1880	7,304		23.5%
1890	8,600		17.7%
1900	9,616		11.8%
1910	10,088		4.9%
1920	9,500		−5.8%
1930	8,368		−11.9%
1940	8,638		3.2%
1950	7,423		−14.1%
1960	7,282		−1.9%
1970	6,851		−5.9%
1980	7,551		10.2%
1990	7,976		5.6%
2000	8,903		11.6%
2010	9,176		3.1%
2020	8,432		−8.1%
2025 (est.)	8,397	▼	−0.4%
U.S. Decennial Census; 1790-1960 1900-1990; 1990-2000 2010-2015

=== 2020 census ===
As of the 2020 census, the county had a population of 8,432. The median age was 45.2 years, 21.7% of residents were under the age of 18, and 21.3% of residents were 65 years of age or older. For every 100 females there were 103.1 males, and for every 100 females age 18 and over there were 100.8 males age 18 and over.

The racial makeup of the county was 93.0% White, 0.3% Black or African American, 0.5% American Indian and Alaska Native, 0.1% Asian, 0.0% Native Hawaiian and Pacific Islander, 0.5% from some other race, and 5.6% from two or more races. Hispanic or Latino residents of any race comprised 1.6% of the population.

Maries County, Missouri – Racial and ethnic composition Note: the US Census treats Hispanic/Latino as an ethnic category. This table excludes Latinos from the racial categories and assigns them to a separate category. Hispanics/Latinos may be of any race.
Race / Ethnicity (NH = Non-Hispanic)	Pop 1980	Pop 1990	Pop 2000	Pop 2010	Pop 2020	% 1980	% 1990	% 2000	% 2010	% 2020
White alone (NH)	7,478	7,879	8,609	8,912	7,796	99.03%	98.78%	96.70%	97.12%	92.46%
Black or African American alone (NH)	3	27	29	24	23	0.04%	0.34%	0.33%	0.26%	0.27%
Native American or Alaska Native alone (NH)	17	19	47	52	42	0.23%	0.24%	0.53%	0.57%	0.50%
Asian alone (NH)	11	10	10	5	7	0.15%	0.13%	0.11%	0.05%	0.08%
Native Hawaiian or Pacific Islander alone (NH)	x	x	0	1	0	x	x	0.00%	0.01%	0.00%
Other race alone (NH)	7	1	4	6	16	0.09%	0.01%	0.04%	0.07%	0.19%
Mixed race or Multiracial (NH)	x	x	101	101	414	x	x	1.13%	1.10%	4.91%
Hispanic or Latino (any race)	35	40	103	75	134	0.46%	0.50%	1.16%	0.82%	1.59%
Total	7,551	7,976	8,903	9,176	8,432	100.00%	100.00%	100.00%	100.00%	100.00%

0.0% of residents lived in urban areas, while 100.0% lived in rural areas.

There were 3,477 households in the county, of which 27.5% had children under the age of 18 living with them and 20.7% had a female householder with no spouse or partner present. About 27.6% of all households were made up of individuals and 12.6% had someone living alone who was 65 years of age or older.

There were 4,263 housing units, of which 18.4% were vacant. Among occupied housing units, 78.6% were owner-occupied and 21.4% were renter-occupied. The homeowner vacancy rate was 1.9% and the rental vacancy rate was 9.2%.

=== 2000 census ===
As of the 2000 census, there were 8,903 people, 3,519 households, and 2,502 families residing in the county. The population density was 17 people per square mile (6.6 people/km^{2}). There were 4,149 housing units at an average density of 8 units per square mile (3.1/km^{2}).

The racial makeup of the county was 97.43% White, 0.33% Black or African American, 0.55% Native American, 0.11% Asian, 0.35% from other races, and 1.24% from two or more races. Approximately 1.16% of the population were Hispanic or Latino of any race.

There were 3,519 households, out of which 31.60% had children under the age of 18 living with them, 59.00% were married couples living together, 7.70% had a female householder with no husband present, and 28.90% were non-families. 25.70% of all households were made up of individuals, and 12.30% had someone living alone who was 65 years of age or older. The average household size was 2.51 and the average family size was 3.00.

In the county, the population was spread out, with 26.00% under the age of 18, 7.30% from 18 to 24, 26.50% from 25 to 44, 24.50% from 45 to 64, and 15.60% who were 65 years of age or older. The median age was 38 years. For every 100 females there were 101.20 males. For every 100 females age 18 and over, there were 97.90 males.

The median income for a household in the county was $31,925, and the median income for a family was $39,187. Males had a median income of $28,524 versus $20,705 for females. The per capita income for the county was $15,662. About 10.10% of families and 13.10% of the population were below the poverty line, including 17.30% of those under age 18 and 13.20% of those age 65 or over.

== Education ==
School districts include (including ones which operate their schools and/or administrative buildings in other counties):

- Maries County R-I School District
- Maries County R-II School District
- Dixon R-I School District
- Rolla 31 School District
- St. Elizabeth R-IV School District
- St. James R-I School District

=== Public schools ===
- Maries County R-I School District – Vienna
  - Vienna Elementary School (PK-06)
  - Vienna High School (07-12)
- Maries County R-II School District – Belle
  - Belle Elementary School (PK-05)
  - Maries County Middle School (06-08)
  - Belle High School (09-12)

=== Private schools ===
- Visitation Inter-Parish School – Vienna (K-08) – Roman Catholic

=== Public libraries ===
- Heartland Regional Library System

== Politics ==
=== Local ===
Once predominantly controlled by the Democratic Party, the local politics in Maries County have become more mixed over the last several years. Democrats currently hold six elected positions while Republicans hold five seats.

Maries County, Missouri

Elected countywide officials
Assessor	Dana Simmons	Democratic
Circuit Clerk	Mark Buschmann	Democratic
County Clerk	Rhonda Rodgers	Democratic
Collector	Jayne Helton Williams	Democratic
Commissioner (presiding)	Victor Stratman	Republican
Commissioner (district 1)	Douglas Drewel	Republican
Commissioner (district 2)	Patrick Kleffner	Independent
Coroner	David H. Martin	Democratic
Prosecuting Attorney	Richard Skouby	Republican
Public Administrator	Amanda Sandbothe	Democratic
Recorder	Mark Buschmann	Democratic
Sheriff	Mark Morgan	Republican
Treasurer	Angie Stricklan	Republican

=== State ===
Past Gubernatorial Elections Results
Year	Republican	Democratic	Third Parties
2024	84.12% 4,010	14.33% 683	1.55% 74
2020	81.20% 3,875	17.08% 815	1.72% 82
2016	62.67% 2,827	33.47% 1,510	3.86% 174
2012	51.51% 2,337	45.58% 2,068	2.91% 132
2008	47.49% 2,157	50.77% 2,306	1.94% 79
2004	60.99% 2,688	37.78% 1,665	1.23% 54
2000	49.11% 1,897	47.53% 1,836	3.36% 130
1996	39.62% 1,451	57.66% 2,115	2.62% 96

All of Maries County is a part of Missouri's 143rd District in the Missouri House of Representatives. (R-Meta).

Missouri House of Representatives — District 62 — Maries County (2016)
Party	Candidate	Votes	%	±%
Republican	Tom Hurst	4,043	100.00%	

Missouri House of Representatives — District 62 — Maries County (2014)
Party	Candidate	Votes	%	±%
Republican	Tom Hurst	2,424	100.00%	+38.05

Missouri House of Representatives — District 62 — Maries County (2012)
Party	Candidate	Votes	%	±%
Republican	Tom Hurst	2,784	61.95%	
Democratic	Greg Stratman	1,710	38.05%	

All of Maries County is a part of Missouri's 6th District in the Missouri Senate and is currently represented by Mike Kehoe (R-Jefferson City).

Missouri Senate — District 6 — Maries County (2014)
Party	Candidate	Votes	%	±%
Republican	Mike Kehoe	2,201	81.13%	
Democratic	Mollie Kristen Freebairn	512	18.87%	

=== Federal ===
U.S. Senate — Missouri — Maries County (2016)
Party	Candidate	Votes	%	±%
Republican	Roy Blunt	2,978	66.27%	+14.99
Democratic	Jason Kander	1,339	29.80%	−11.67
Libertarian	Jonathan Dine	76	1.69%	−5.56
Green	Johnathan McFarland	37	0.82%	+0.82
Constitution	Fred Ryman	64	1.42%	+1.42

U.S. Senate — Missouri — Maries County (2012)
Party	Candidate	Votes	%	±%
Republican	Todd Akin	2,312	51.28%	
Democratic	Claire McCaskill	1,870	41.47%	
Libertarian	Jonathan Dine	327	7.25%	

All of Maries County is included in Missouri's 3rd Congressional District and is currently represented by Blaine Luetkemeyer (R-St. Elizabeth) in the U.S. House of Representatives.

U.S. House of Representatives — Missouri’s 3rd Congressional District — Maries County (2016)
Party	Candidate	Votes	%	±%
Republican	Blaine Luetkemeyer	3,490	78.32%	+3.41
Democratic	Kevin Miller	825	18.51%	−3.60
Libertarian	Dan Hogan	90	2.02%	−0.92
Constitution	Doanita Simmons	51	1.15%	+1.15

U.S. House of Representatives — Missouri's 3rd Congressional District — Maries County (2014)
Party	Candidate	Votes	%	±%
Republican	Blaine Luetkemeyer	2,036	74.91%	+2.12
Democratic	Courtney Denton	601	22.11%	−2.48
Libertarian	Steven Hedrick	80	2.94%	+0.32
Write-In	Harold Davis	1	0.04%	+0.04

U.S. House of Representatives — Missouri's 3rd Congressional District — Maries County (2012)
Party	Candidate	Votes	%	±%
Republican	Blaine Luetkemeyer	3,253	72.79%	
Democratic	Eric C. Mayer	1,099	24.59%	
Libertarian	Steven Wilson	117	2.62%	

==== Political culture ====
United States presidential election results for Maries County, Missouri
Year	Republican		Democratic		Third party(ies)	
Year	No.	%	No.	%	No.	%
1888	539	32.93%	1,055	64.45%	43	2.63%
1892	469	29.00%	1,119	69.20%	29	1.79%
1896	546	28.20%	1,385	71.54%	5	0.26%
1900	544	29.84%	1,273	69.83%	6	0.33%
1904	599	33.08%	1,184	65.38%	28	1.55%
1908	703	34.66%	1,309	64.55%	16	0.79%
1912	448	25.91%	1,096	63.39%	185	10.70%
1916	725	34.96%	1,319	63.60%	30	1.45%
1920	1,445	45.87%	1,677	53.24%	28	0.89%
1924	1,004	33.00%	1,913	62.89%	125	4.11%
1928	1,415	43.79%	1,808	55.96%	8	0.25%
1932	745	21.16%	2,758	78.33%	18	0.51%
1936	1,306	34.92%	2,414	64.55%	20	0.53%
1940	1,749	45.59%	2,078	54.17%	9	0.23%
1944	1,519	45.13%	1,824	54.19%	23	0.68%
1948	894	31.41%	1,948	68.45%	4	0.14%
1952	1,501	45.62%	1,783	54.19%	6	0.18%
1956	1,392	42.48%	1,885	57.52%	0	0.00%
1960	1,684	49.53%	1,716	50.47%	0	0.00%
1964	1,183	36.44%	2,063	63.56%	0	0.00%
1968	1,438	47.52%	1,185	39.16%	403	13.32%
1972	2,082	63.07%	1,219	36.93%	0	0.00%
1976	1,485	45.08%	1,796	54.52%	13	0.39%
1980	1,985	52.39%	1,732	45.71%	72	1.90%
1984	2,267	62.02%	1,388	37.98%	0	0.00%
1988	1,919	55.14%	1,552	44.60%	9	0.26%
1992	1,356	33.77%	1,732	43.14%	927	23.09%
1996	1,560	42.90%	1,540	42.35%	536	14.74%
2000	2,216	57.50%	1,554	40.32%	84	2.18%
2004	2,825	63.86%	1,563	35.33%	36	0.81%
2008	2,853	62.58%	1,599	35.07%	107	2.35%
2012	3,165	69.74%	1,299	28.62%	74	1.63%
2016	3,561	79.13%	794	17.64%	145	3.22%
2020	3,892	81.58%	814	17.06%	65	1.36%
2024	3,987	83.31%	755	15.78%	44	0.92%

=== Missouri presidential preference primary (2008) ===
Former U.S. Senator Hillary Clinton (D-New York) received more votes, a total of 844, than any candidate from either party in Maries County during the 2008 presidential primary.

== Communities ==
=== Cities and towns ===
- Argyle (also in Osage County)
- Belle (a small portion extends into Osage County)
- Vienna (county seat)

=== Unincorporated communities ===
- Bend
- Brinktown
- Hayden
- High Gate
- Lanes Prairie
- Light
- Lindell
- Lois
- Paydown
- Safe
- Stickney
- Sudheimer
- Summerfield
- Tavern
- Van Cleve
- Venus
- Vichy

== See also ==
- National Register of Historic Places listings in Maries County, Missouri
