= Belle, Missouri =

City in Maries and Osage counties in Missouri, United States

- City
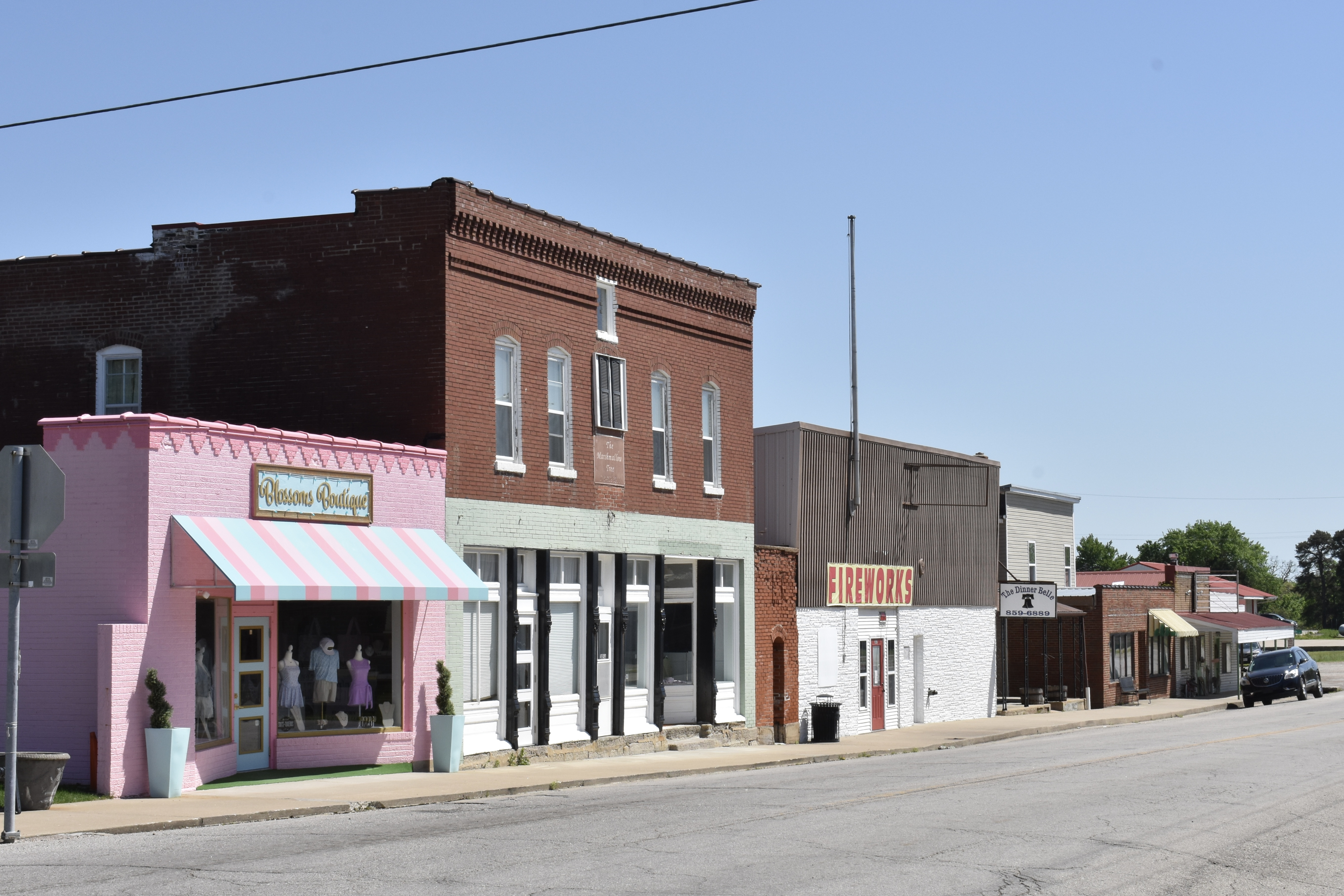
- Downtown Belle

- Location in Maries County and the state of Missouri
- Coordinates: 38°17′05″N 91°43′19″W
- Country: United States
- State: Missouri
- Counties: Maries, Osage
- Incorporated: 1895

Government
  - Mayor: Chris Heitman

Area
  - Total: 1.34 sq mi (3.46 km^{2})
  - Land: 1.34 sq mi (3.46 km^{2})
  - Water: 0 sq mi (0.00 km^{2})
- Elevation: 1,024 ft (312 m)

Population (2020)
  - Total: 1,381
  - Density: 1,034.6/sq mi (399.48/km^{2})
- Time zone: UTC-6 (Central (CST))
  - Summer (DST): UTC-5 (CDT)
- ZIP code: 65013
- Area code: 573
- FIPS code: 29-04150
- GNIS feature ID: 2394112
- Website: cityofbellemo.org

Belle is a city in northeast Maries County and extending north into southeast Osage County in Missouri, United States. The population was 1,381 at the 2020 census, down from 1,545 in 2010.

The Osage County portion of Belle is part of the Jefferson City, Missouri Metropolitan Statistical Area.

== History ==
A post office called Belle has been in operation since 1895.Belle, Missouri was named after Belle Wallace, an early local resident. Local history records note that when the railroad arrived and local merchants met to name the town, they chose to name it after her because she was the only unmarried girl living in the area at that time.The Namesake: Belle Wallace was born near Dixon, Missouri in 1886 and moved to the local prairie area with her family.The Decision: Town founders and merchants chose her name during a community meeting around the time the railroad depot was established. Belle was a depot on the Chicago, Rock Island and Pacific Railroad, commonly known as the Rock Island.

== Geography ==
Belle is located in northeastern Maries County and southeastern Osage County at the intersection of Missouri routes 28 and 89. Vienna, the Belle county seat, is 17 miles (27 km) to the southwest along routes 28 and 42. Bland in Gasconade County is 5 miles (8 km) to the east-northeast along Route 28, while Linn is 18 miles (29 km) to the northwest along Route 89. Belle is 93 miles (150 km) west-southwest of St. Louis.

According to the U.S. Census Bureau, Belle has a total area of 1.34 square miles (3.47 km^{2}), of which 0.001 square miles (0.6 acres), or 0.07%, are water. The city sits on high ground which drains northwest toward the Gasconade River, a tributary of the Missouri River, and southeast toward the Dry Fork, a tributary of the Bourbeuse River and part of the Meramec River watershed.

== Demographics ==
Historical population
Census	Pop.	Note	%±
1910	383		—
1920	437		14.1%
1930	630		44.2%
1940	621		−1.4%
1950	906		45.9%
1960	1,016		12.1%
1970	1,133		11.5%
1980	1,233		8.8%
1990	1,218		−1.2%
2000	1,344		10.3%
2010	1,545		15.0%
2020	1,381		−10.6%
U.S. Decennial Census

=== 2010 census ===
As of the census of 2010, there were 1,545 people, 659 households, and 408 families living in the city. The population density was 1,153.0 inhabitants per square mile (445.2/km^{2}). There were 734 housing units at an average density of 547.8 per square mile (211.5/km^{2}). The racial makeup of the city was 97.5% White, 0.2% African American, 0.1% Native American, 0.6% from other races, and 1.6% from two or more races. Hispanic or Latino of any race were 1.4% of the population.

There were 659 households, of which 33.1% had children under the age of 18 living with them, 41.0% were married couples living together, 15.2% had a female householder with no husband present, 5.8% had a male householder with no wife present, and 38.1% were non-families. 33.1% of all households were made up of individuals, and 17% had someone living alone who was 65 years of age or older. The average household size was 2.34 and the average family size was 2.91.

The median age in the city was 36.2 years. 26.7% of residents were under the age of 18; 8.6% were between the ages of 18 and 24; 24.4% were from 25 to 44; 24.5% were from 45 to 64; and 15.7% were 65 years of age or older. The gender makeup of the city was 48.6% male and 51.4% female.

=== 2000 census ===
As of the census of 2000, there were 1,344 people, 595 households, and 357 families living in the city. The population density was 1,062.1 inhabitants per square mile (410.1/km^{2}). There were 652 housing units at an average density of 515.2 per square mile (198.9/km^{2}). The racial makeup of the city was 97.10% White, 0.07% African American, 0.52% Native American, 0.60% from other races, and 1.71% from two or more races. Hispanic or Latino of any race were 1.12% of the population.

There were 595 households, out of which 29.9% had children under the age of 18 living with them, 41.3% were married couples living together, 13.6% had a female householder with no husband present, and 40.0% were non-families. 36.0% of all households were made up of individuals, and 19.5% had someone living alone who was 65 years of age or older. The average household size was 2.23 and the average family size was 2.83.

In the city, the population was spread out, with 26.0% under the age of 18, 10.2% from 18 to 24, 24.9% from 25 to 44, 20.2% from 45 to 64, and 18.8% who were 65 years of age or older. The median age was 36 years. For every 100 females, there were 82.9 males. For every 100 females age 18 and over, there were 74.6 males.

The median income for a household in the city was $24,091, and the median income for a family was $35,982. Males had a median income of $27,917 versus $17,857 for females. The per capita income for the city was $17,785. About 14.7% of families and 19.3% of the population were below the poverty line, including 31.3% of those under age 18 and 15.2% of those age 65 or over.

== Education ==
The portions of Belle in both counties are all in the Maries County R-II School District,. which operates Belle Elementary and High School in the community.

Belle has a public library, a branch of the Heartland Regional Library System.

== See also ==
- List of cities in Missouri
