= Osage County, Missouri =

County in Missouri, United States

- County
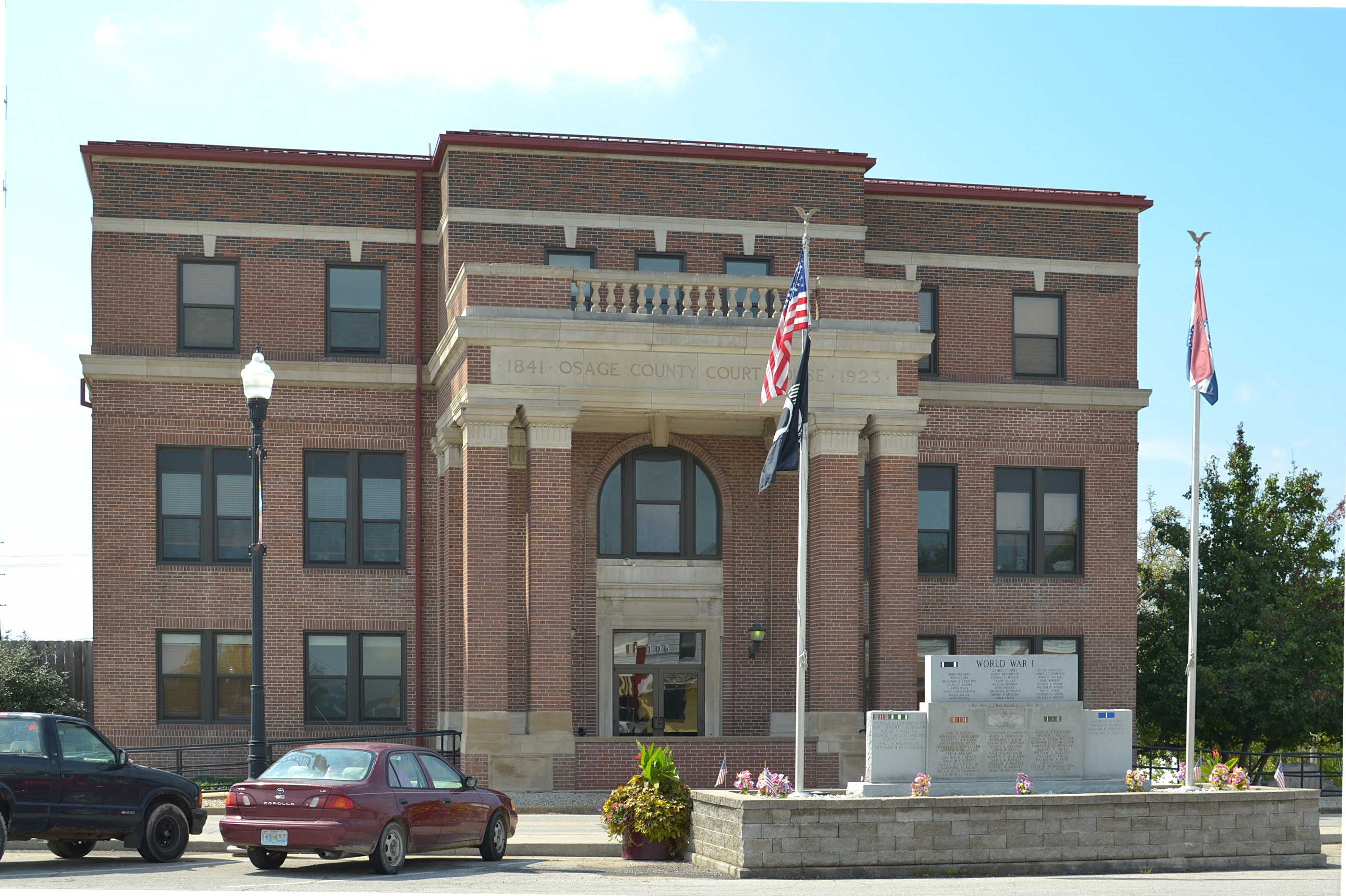
- The Osage County Courthouse in Linn

- Location within the U.S. state of Missouri
- Coordinates: 38°28′N 91°52′W
- Country: United States
- State: Missouri
- Founded: January 29, 1841
- Named for: Osage River
- Seat: Linn
- Largest city: Linn

Area
  - Total: 611 sq mi (1,580 km^{2})
  - Land: 604 sq mi (1,560 km^{2})
  - Water: 6.1 sq mi (16 km^{2}) 1.0%

Population (2020)
  - Total: 13,274
  - Estimate (2025): 13,611 ▲
  - Density: 22.0/sq mi (8.49/km^{2})
- Time zone: UTC−6 (Central)
  - Summer (DST): UTC−5 (CDT)
- Congressional district: 3rd
- Website: osagecountygov.com

Osage County (/ˈoʊseɪdʒ/ OH-sayj) is a county in the central part of the U.S. state of Missouri. As of the 2020 census, the population was 13,274. Its county seat is Linn. The county was organized January 29, 1841, and named from the Osage River.

Osage County is part of the Jefferson City, Missouri Metropolitan Area. Its geography and the founding of Westphalia Vineyards links it to the Missouri Rhineland, extending along the Missouri River valley to the western edges of the St. Louis Metropolitan Area.

According to data from the 2010 census, Osage County is the whitest county in Missouri, with 98.85 percent of residents being white.

== Geography ==
According to the U.S. Census Bureau, the county has a total area of 610 square miles (1,600 km^{2}), of which 604 square miles (1,560 km^{2}) is land and 6.1 square miles (16 km^{2}) (1.0%) is water.

=== Adjacent counties ===
- Callaway County (north)
- Gasconade County (east)
- Maries County (south)
- Miller County (southwest)
- Cole County (west)
- Montgomery County (northeast)

=== Major highways ===
- U.S. Route 50
- U.S. Route 63
- Route 28
- Route 89
- Route 100
- Route 133

== Demographics ==
Historical population
Census	Pop.	Note	%±
1850	6,704		—
1860	7,879		17.5%
1870	10,793		37.0%
1880	11,824		9.6%
1890	13,080		10.6%
1900	14,096		7.8%
1910	14,283		1.3%
1920	13,559		−5.1%
1930	12,462		−8.1%
1940	12,375		−0.7%
1950	11,301		−8.7%
1960	10,867		−3.8%
1970	10,994		1.2%
1980	12,014		9.3%
1990	12,018		0.0%
2000	13,062		8.7%
2010	13,878		6.2%
2020	13,274		−4.4%
2025 (est.)	13,611	▲	2.5%
U.S. Decennial Census; 1790-1960 1900-1990; 1990-2000 2010-2015

=== 2020 census ===
As of the 2020 census, the county had a population of 13,274, the median age was 41.3 years, 22.8% of residents were under the age of 18, and 18.6% were 65 years of age or older; there were 105.2 males for every 100 females and 106.9 males for every 100 females age 18 and over.

0.0% of residents lived in urban areas, while 100.0% lived in rural areas.

There were 5,349 households in the county, of which 29.2% had children under the age of 18 living with them and 17.9% had a female householder with no spouse or partner present; about 27.3% of all households were made up of individuals and 11.6% had someone living alone who was 65 years of age or older.

There were 6,492 housing units, of which 17.6% were vacant; among occupied units, 80.5% were owner-occupied and 19.5% were renter-occupied, with homeowner and rental vacancy rates of 1.3% and 15.7%, respectively.

The racial makeup of the county was 96.0% White, 0.2% Black or African American, 0.2% American Indian and Alaska Native, 0.0% Asian, 0.1% Native Hawaiian and Pacific Islander, 0.2% some other race, and 3.3% from two or more races; Hispanic or Latino residents of any race comprised 0.9% of the population. The table below provides the counts and percentages for these groups.

=== 2020 census ===
Osage County, Missouri – Racial and ethnic composition Note: the US Census treats Hispanic/Latino as an ethnic category. This table excludes Latinos from the racial categories and assigns them to a separate category. Hispanics/Latinos may be of any race.
Race / Ethnicity (NH = Non-Hispanic)	Pop 1980	Pop 1990	Pop 2000	Pop 2010	Pop 2020	% 1980	% 1990	% 2000	% 2010	% 2020
White alone (NH)	11,920	11,901	12,828	13,654	12,688	99.22%	99.03%	98.21%	98.39%	95.59%
Black or African American alone (NH)	2	38	16	28	24	0.02%	0.32%	0.12%	0.20%	0.18%
Native American or Alaska Native alone (NH)	15	20	31	29	28	0.12%	0.17%	0.24%	0.21%	0.21%
Asian alone (NH)	5	2	10	14	3	0.04%	0.02%	0.08%	0.10%	0.02%
Native Hawaiian or Pacific Islander alone (NH)	x	x	3	4	10	x	x	0.02%	0.03%	0.08%
Other race alone (NH)	2	1	1	1	10	0.02%	0.01%	0.01%	0.01%	0.08%
Mixed race or Multiracial (NH)	x	x	96	64	386	x	x	0.73%	0.46%	2.91%
Hispanic or Latino (any race)	70	56	77	84	125	0.58%	0.47%	0.59%	0.61%	0.94%
Total	12,014	12,018	13,062	13,878	13,274	100.00%	100.00%	100.00%	100.00%	100.00%

=== 2000 census ===
As of the 2000 census, there were 13,062 people, 4,922 households, and 3,578 families residing in the county. The population density was 22 people per square mile (8.5 people/km^{2}). There were 5,904 housing units at an average density of 10 units per square mile (3.9/km^{2}). The racial makeup of the county was 98.64% White, 0.16% Black or African American, 0.24% Native American, 0.08% Asian, 0.02% Pacific Islander, 0.07% from other races, and 0.80% from two or more races. Approximately 0.59% of the population were Hispanic or Latino of any race.

There were 4,922 households, out of which 34.90% had children under the age of 18 living with them, 61.70% were married couples living together, 6.70% had a female householder with no husband present, and 27.30% were non-families. 23.80% of all households were made up of individuals, and 10.80% had someone living alone who was 65 years of age or older. The average household size was 2.61 and the average family size was 3.10.

In the county, the population was spread out, with 26.30% under the age of 18, 9.50% from 18 to 24, 27.70% from 25 to 44, 21.70% from 45 to 64, and 14.70% who were 65 years of age or older. The median age was 36 years. For every 100 females, there were 103.00 males. For every 100 females age 18 and over, there were 102.50 males.

The median income for a household in the county was $39,565, and the median income for a family was $46,503. Males had a median income of $29,538 versus $22,353 for females. The per capita income for the county was $17,245. About 5.90% of families and 8.30% of the population were below the poverty line, including 9.00% of those under age 18 and 10.40% of those age 65 or over.

== Education ==
School districts with any amount of territory in the county, no matter how slight, include:

- Osage County R-I School District
- Osage County R-II School District
- Osage County R-III School District
- Maries County R-II School District
- Gasconade County R-II School District

=== Public schools ===
- Osage County R-I School District – Chamois
  - Osage County R-I Elementary School (PK-06)
  - Chamois High School (07-12)
- Osage County R-II School District – Linn
  - Osage County R-II Elementary School (PK-06)
  - Linn High School (07-12)
- Osage County R-III School District – Westphalia
  - Fatima Elementary School (PK-06)
  - Fatima High School (07-12)

=== Private schools ===
- St. Joseph Catholic School – Westphalia (K-09) – Roman Catholic
- Immaculate Conception School – Loose Creek (K-09) – Roman Catholic
- St. George School – Linn (K-09) – Roman Catholic
- Sacred Heart School – Rich Fountain (K-09) – Roman Catholic
- Holy Family School – Freeburg (K-09) – Roman Catholic
- St. Mary's School – Bonnots Mill (K-09) – Roman Catholic

=== Post-secondary ===
- State Technical College of Missouri - Linn, Missouri

=== Public libraries ===
- Osage County Library

== Communities ==
=== Cities and Towns ===
- Argyle (a portion of the city extends into Maries County)
- Belle (mostly in Maries County)
- Bland (mostly in Gasconade County)
- Chamois
- Freeburg
- Linn (county seat)
- Meta
- Westphalia

=== Unincorporated communities ===
- Aud
- Babbtown
- Bonnots Mill
- Byron
- Cooper Hill
- Crook
- Deer
- Folk
- Frankenstein
- Freedom
- Hope
- Judge
- Koeltztown
- Koenig
- Loose Creek
- Luystown
- Mint Hill
- Potts
- Rich Fountain
- Saint Aubert

== Politics ==
=== Local ===
The Republican Party mostly controls politics at the local level in Osage County. Republicans currently hold over half of the elected positions in the county.

Osage County, Missouri

Elected countywide officials
Assessor	Tina Kammerich	Republican
Circuit Clerk	Beth Billington	Democratic
County Clerk	Nicci Kammerich	Republican
Collector	Denise Nolte	Republican
Commissioner (presiding)	Darryl Griffin	Republican
Commissioner (district 1)	John Trenshaw	Republican
Commissioner (district 2)	Larry Kliethermes	Republican
Coroner	A.J. Probst	Republican
Prosecuting Attorney	Amanda L. Grellner	Republican
Public Administrator	Paul G. Stratman	Republican
Recorder	Cindy Hoffman	Democratic
Sheriff	Michael Bonham	Republican
Surveyor	Timothy Hamburg	Democratic
Treasurer	Valerie Prater	Republican

=== State ===
Past Gubernatorial Elections Results
Year	Republican	Democratic	Third Parties
2024	87.74% 6,777	10.58% 817	1.68% 130
2020	86.43% 6,512	12.30% 927	1.26% 95
2016	64.64% 4,579	32.76% 2,321	2.60% 184
2012	58.37% 4,016	39.42% 2,712	2.21% 152
2008	59.51% 4,212	39.45% 2,792	1.04% 74
2004	68.67% 4,586	30.61% 2,044	0.71% 48
2000	55.78% 3,450	42.78% 2,646	1.44% 89
1996	38.80% 2,151	59.33% 3,289	1.88% 104

Osage County is split between two of the districts that elect members of the Missouri House of Representatives, and both are represented by Republicans.

- District 61 — Aaron Griesheimer). Consists of the northern half of the county.

Missouri House of Representatives — District 61 — Osage County (2018)
Party	Candidate	Votes	%	±%
Republican	Aaron D. Griesheimer	1,909	81.54%	+5.00
Democratic	Pamela A. Menefee	431	18.41%	−5.00

Missouri House of Representatives — District 61 — Osage County (2016)
Party	Candidate	Votes	%	±%
Republican	Justin Alferman	2,147	74.63%	−1.48
Democratic	Tom Smith	593	20.61%	+1.48

Missouri House of Representatives — District 61 — Osage County (2012)
Party	Candidate	Votes	%	±%
Republican	Dave Schatz	1,965	74.80%	
Democratic	Michael Sage	662	25.20%	

- District 62 — Tom Hurst (R- Meta). Consists of Linn and the southern half of the county.

Missouri House of Representatives — District 62 — Osage County (2016)
Party	Candidate	Votes	%	±%
Republican	Tom Hurst	3,906	100.00%	

Missouri House of Representatives — District 62 — Osage County (2014)
Party	Candidate	Votes	%	±%
Republican	Tom Hurst	2,195	100.00%	+32.51

Missouri House of Representatives — District 62 — Osage County (2012)
Party	Candidate	Votes	%	±%
Republican	Tom Hurst	2,755	67.49%	
Democratic	Greg Stratman	1,327	32.51%	

All of Osage County is a part of Missouri's 6th District in the Missouri Senate and is currently represented by Mike Kehoe (R-Jefferson City).

Missouri Senate — District 6 — Osage County (2014)
Party	Candidate	Votes	%	±%
Republican	Mike Kehoe	3,541	85.63%	
Democratic	Mollie Kristen Fairbairn	594	14.37%	

=== Federal ===
U.S. Senate — Missouri — Osage County (2018)
Party	Candidate	Votes	%	±%
Republican	Josh Hawley	4,626	76.04%	+9.30
Democratic	Claire McCaskill	1,255	20.63%	−5.75
Libertarian	Japeth Campbell	44	0.72%	+0.72
Green	Jo Crain	28	0.46%	+0.46
Independent	Craig O'Dear	80	1.31%	+1.31

U.S. Senate — Missouri — Osage County (2012)
Party	Candidate	Votes	%	±%
Republican	Todd Akin	3,986	58.49%	
Democratic	Claire McCaskill	2,359	34.61%	
Libertarian	Jonathan Dine	470	6.90%	

All of Osage County is included in Missouri's 3rd Congressional District and is currently represented by Blaine Luetkemeyer (R-St. Elizabeth) in the U.S. House of Representatives.

U.S. House of Representatives — Missouri’s 3rd Congressional District — Osage County (2016)
Party	Candidate	Votes	%	±%
Republican	Blaine Luetkemeyer	5,956	84.89%	+2.02
Democratic	Kevin Miller	889	12.67%	−1.71
Libertarian	Dan Hogan	122	1.74%	−0.94
Constitution	Doanita Simmons	49	0.70%	+0.70

U.S. House of Representatives — Missouri's 3rd Congressional District — Osage County (2014)
Party	Candidate	Votes	%	±%
Republican	Blaine Luetkemeyer	3,435	82.87%	−0.58
Democratic	Courtney Denton	596	14.38%	−0.13
Libertarian	Steven Hedrick	111	2.68%	+0.64
Write-In	Harold Davis	3	0.07%	+0.07

U.S. House of Representatives — Missouri's 3rd Congressional District — Osage County (2012)
Party	Candidate	Votes	%	±%
Republican	Blaine Luetkemeyer	5,694	83.45%	
Democratic	Eric C. Meyer	990	14.51%	
Libertarian	Steven Wilson	139	2.04%	

==== Political culture ====
United States presidential election results for Osage County, Missouri
Year	Republican		Democratic		Third party(ies)	
Year	No.	%	No.	%	No.	%
1888	1,446	54.04%	1,190	44.47%	40	1.49%
1892	1,378	51.23%	1,266	47.06%	46	1.71%
1896	1,700	53.26%	1,456	45.61%	36	1.13%
1900	1,731	54.28%	1,396	43.78%	62	1.94%
1904	1,699	52.70%	1,451	45.01%	74	2.30%
1908	1,820	55.24%	1,439	43.67%	36	1.09%
1912	981	33.56%	1,394	47.69%	548	18.75%
1916	1,769	55.56%	1,383	43.44%	32	1.01%
1920	3,699	76.17%	1,118	23.02%	39	0.80%
1924	2,496	51.98%	1,986	41.36%	320	6.66%
1928	2,474	44.40%	3,092	55.49%	6	0.11%
1932	1,798	33.38%	3,567	66.21%	22	0.41%
1936	2,836	48.08%	2,995	50.77%	68	1.15%
1940	3,743	61.50%	2,332	38.32%	11	0.18%
1944	3,284	60.68%	2,121	39.19%	7	0.13%
1948	2,488	48.12%	2,672	51.68%	10	0.19%
1952	3,404	60.73%	2,191	39.09%	10	0.18%
1956	3,077	55.72%	2,445	44.28%	0	0.00%
1960	2,678	48.01%	2,900	51.99%	0	0.00%
1964	2,712	50.98%	2,608	49.02%	0	0.00%
1968	3,107	61.63%	1,540	30.55%	394	7.82%
1972	4,266	74.18%	1,485	25.82%	0	0.00%
1976	3,224	61.19%	2,015	38.24%	30	0.57%
1980	3,679	63.19%	2,045	35.13%	98	1.68%
1984	4,381	76.54%	1,343	23.46%	0	0.00%
1988	3,885	68.58%	1,771	31.26%	9	0.16%
1992	2,784	45.84%	1,860	30.63%	1,429	23.53%
1996	2,890	51.90%	2,045	36.73%	633	11.37%
2000	4,154	67.24%	1,938	31.37%	86	1.39%
2004	4,975	74.58%	1,673	25.08%	23	0.34%
2008	5,062	71.51%	1,907	26.94%	110	1.55%
2012	5,329	77.02%	1,473	21.29%	117	1.69%
2016	5,856	82.60%	998	14.08%	236	3.33%
2020	6,425	85.22%	1,037	13.76%	77	1.02%
2024	6,657	86.15%	1,009	13.06%	61	0.79%

=== Missouri presidential preference primary (2016) ===
Donald J. Trump received more votes, a total of 1,316, than any candidate from either party in Osage County during the 2016 presidential primary.

== See also ==
- National Register of Historic Places listings in Osage County, Missouri
