= Vienna, Missouri =

City in Missouri, U.S.

- City
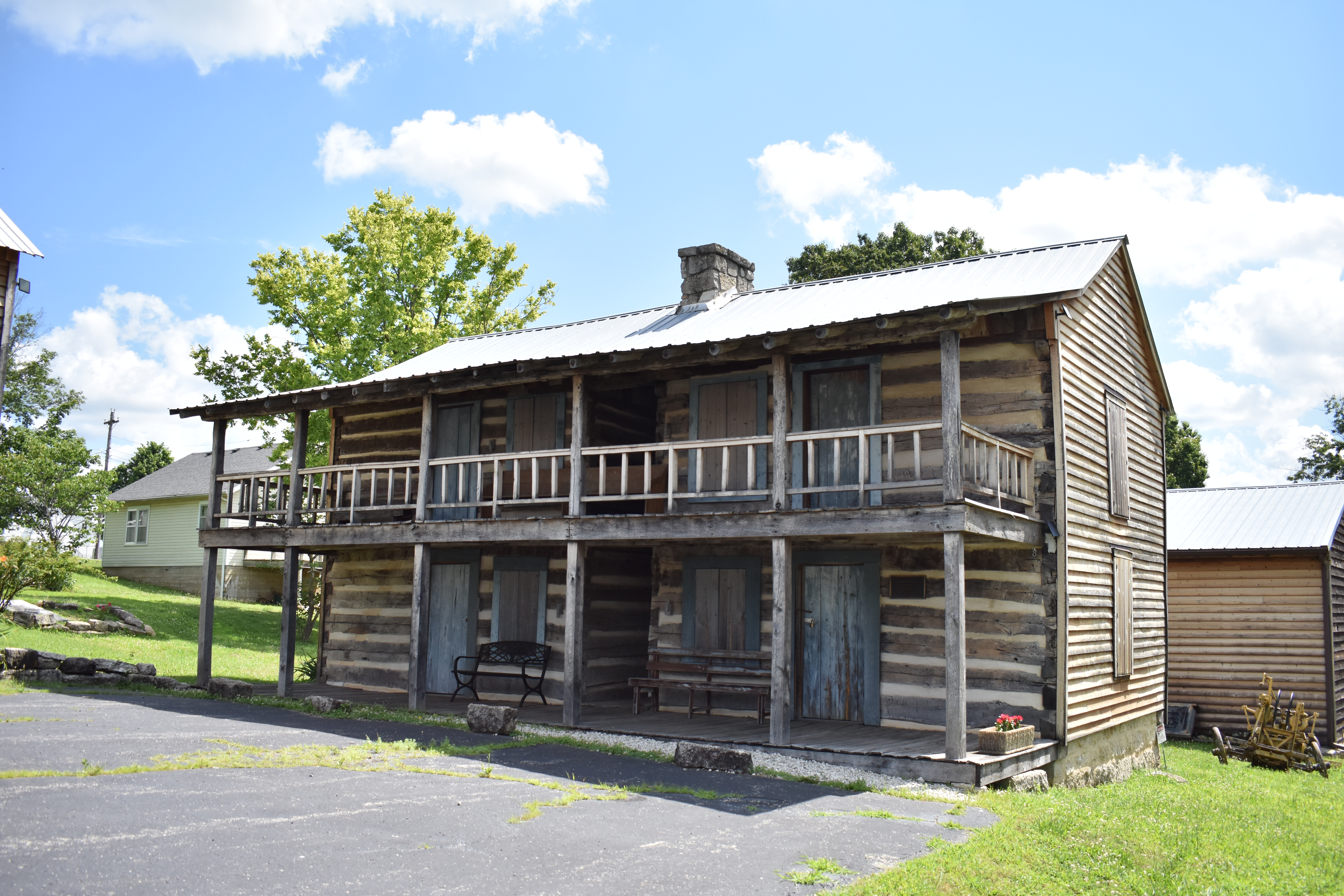
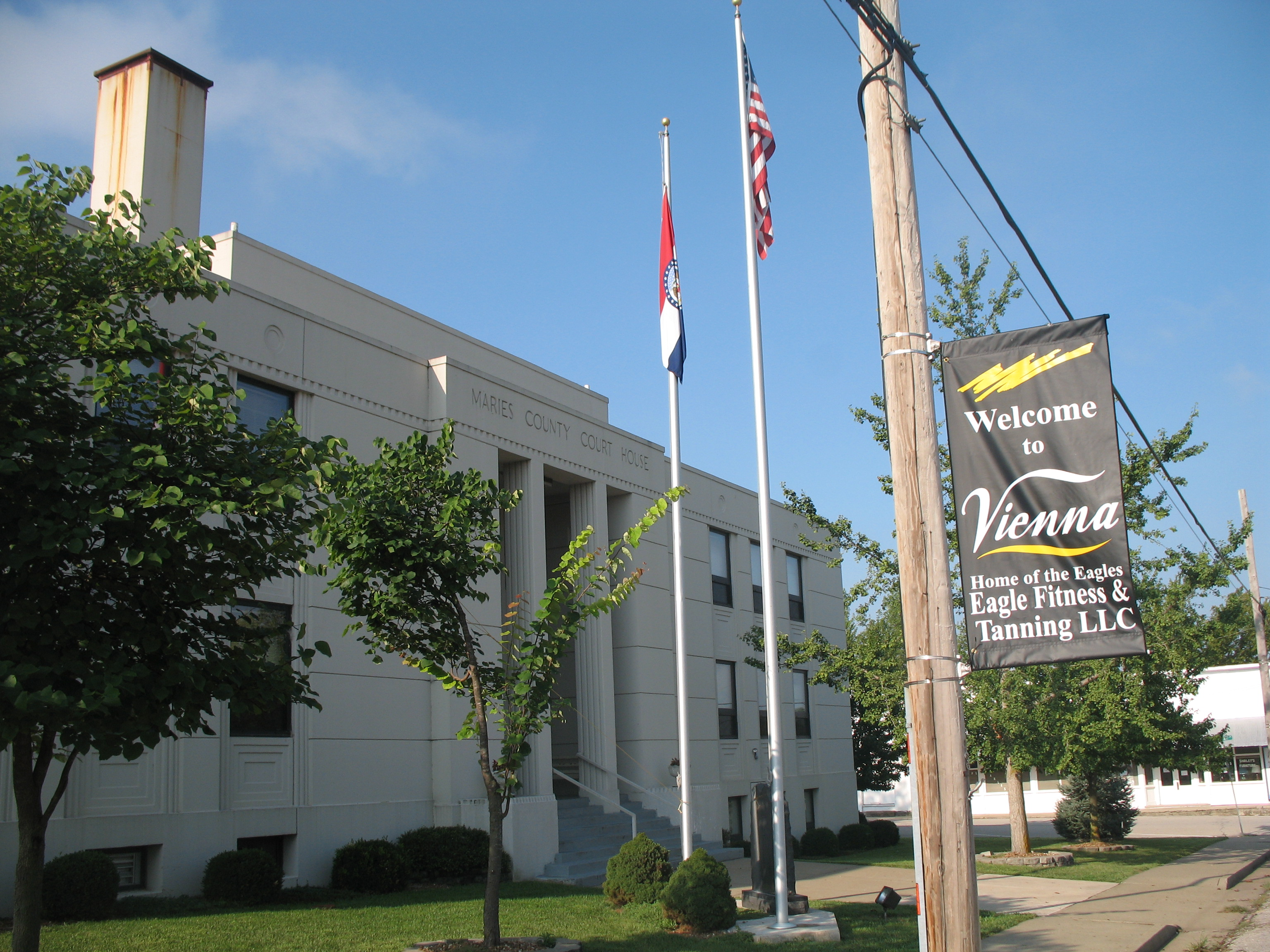
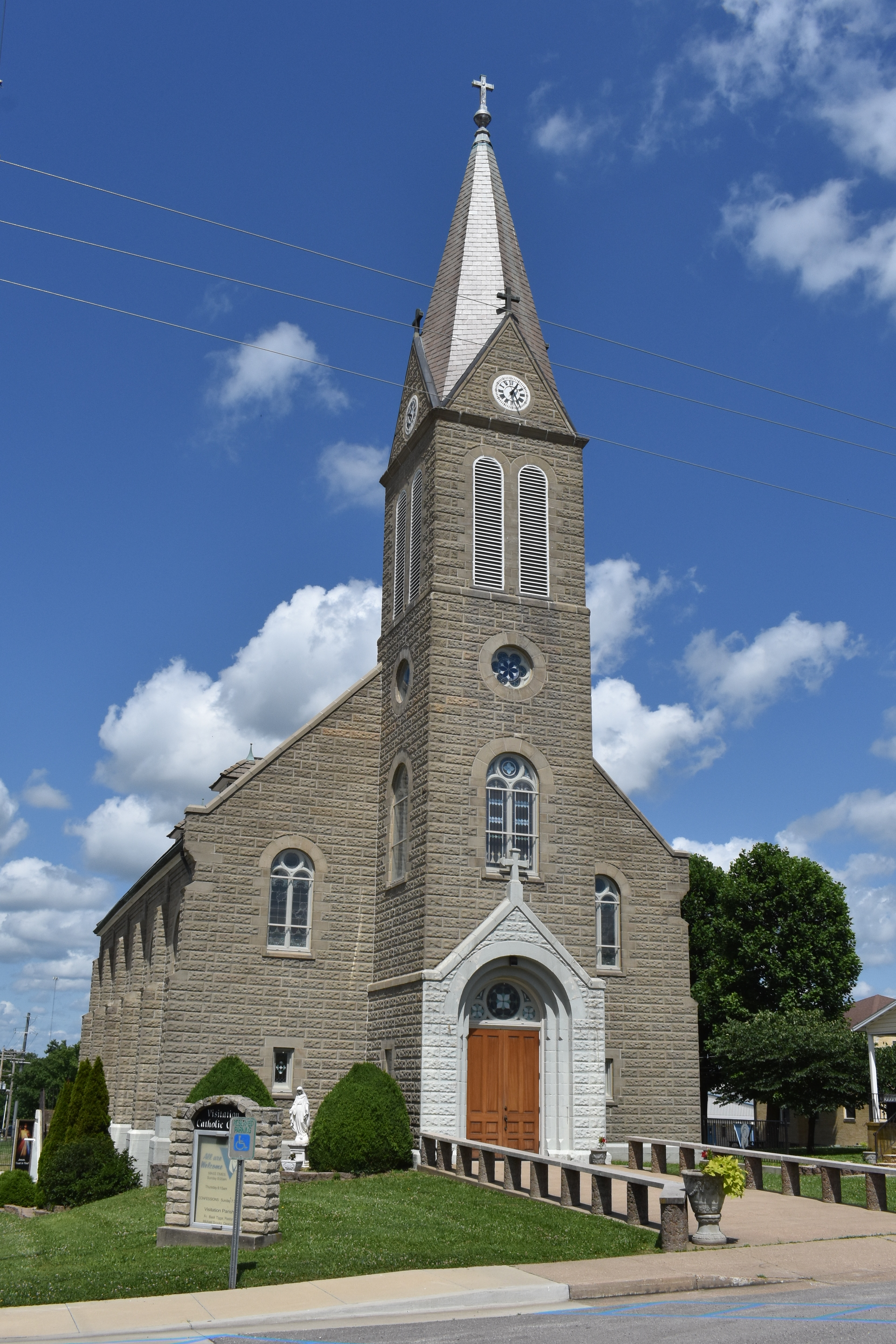
- Latham House Maries County Courthouse Visitation Catholic Church

- Location in Maries County and the state of Missouri
- Coordinates: 38°11′15″N 91°57′00″W
- Country: United States
- State: Missouri
- County: Maries
- Incorporated: 1856
- Named for: Vienna, Austria

Government
  - Mayor: Tyler "TC" James

Area
  - Total: 1.07 sq mi (2.77 km^{2})
  - Land: 1.07 sq mi (2.77 km^{2})
  - Water: 0 sq mi (0.00 km^{2})
- Elevation: 843 ft (257 m)

Population (2020)
  - Total: 581
  - Density: 544.2/sq mi (210.11/km^{2})
- Time zone: UTC-6 (Central (CST))
  - Summer (DST): UTC-5 (CDT)
- ZIP Code: 65582
- Area code: 573
- FIPS code: 29-76102
- GNIS feature ID: 2397138

Vienna (/vaɪˈɛnə/ vy-EN-ə) is a city in and the county seat of Maries County, Missouri, United States. Its population was 581 at the 2020 census.

== History ==
Vienna became the county seat in 1855. It was likely named after Vienna, Austria, although, according to folklore, the town was named after Vie Anna, the deceased daughter of a county judge. A post office called Vienna has been in operation since 1856.

The Maries County Jail and Sheriff's House was added to the National Register of Historic Places in 2002.

== Demographics ==
Historical population
Census	Pop.	Note	%±
1930	348		—
1940	433		24.4%
1950	471		8.8%
1960	536		13.8%
1970	505		−5.8%
1980	514		1.8%
1990	611		18.9%
2000	628		2.8%
2010	610		−2.9%
2020	581		−4.8%
U.S. Decennial Census

=== 2010 census ===
As of the census of 2010, there were 610 people, 264 households, and 134 families living in the city. The population density was 575.5 inhabitants per square mile (222.2/km^{2}). There were 341 housing units at an average density of 321.7 per square mile (124.2/km^{2}). The racial makeup of the city was 98.4% White, 0.2% African American, 0.7% Native American, and 0.8% from two or more races. Hispanic or Latino of any race were 0.5% of the population.

There were 264 households, of which 23.5% had children under the age of 18 living with them, 37.9% were married couples living together, 8.0% had a female householder with no husband present, 4.9% had a male householder with no wife present, and 49.2% were non-families. 47.0% of all households were made up of individuals, and 31.1% had someone living alone who was 65 years of age or older. The average household size was 2.06 and the average family size was 2.88.

The median age in the city was 47.3 years. 20.8% of residents were under the age of 18; 7.7% were between the ages of 18 and 24; 18.9% were from 25 to 44; 23.9% were from 45 to 64; and 28.9% were 65 years of age or older. The gender makeup of the city was 47.5% male and 52.5% female.

=== 2000 census ===
As of the census of 2000, there were 628 people, 257 households, and 139 families living in the city. The population density was 594.0 inhabitants per square mile (229.3/km^{2}). There were 297 housing units at an average density of 280.9 per square mile (108.5/km^{2}). The racial makeup of the city was 98.73% White, 0.48% Native American, 0.16% Asian, and 0.64% from two or more races.

There were 257 households, out of which 24.1% had children under the age of 18 living with them, 38.5% were married couples living together, 9.7% had a female householder with no husband present, and 45.9% were non-families. 44.4% of all households were made up of individuals, and 27.6% had someone living alone who was 65 years of age or older. The average household size was 2.11 and the average family size was 2.94.

In the city, the population was spread out, with 20.1% under the age of 18, 9.9% from 18 to 24, 21.8% from 25 to 44, 17.5% from 45 to 64, and 30.7% who were 65 years of age or older. The median age was 43 years. For every 100 females, there were 79.4 males. For every 100 females age 18 and over, there were 72.5 males.

The median income for a household in the city was $23,456, and the median income for a family was $36,250. Males had a median income of $24,722 versus $20,000 for females. The per capita income for the city was $13,682. About 4.4% of families and 8.1% of the population were below the poverty line, including 2.2% of those under age 18 and 10.4% of those age 65 or over.

== Geography ==
Vienna is located in central Maries County at the intersection of US Route 63 and Missouri Route 42. The city lies between the Gasconade River two miles to the east and the Maries River about two miles to the west. Rolla is 25 miles (40 km) to the southeast via US 63.

According to the U.S. Census Bureau, Vienna has a total area of 1.07 square miles (2.77 km^{2}), of which 0.001 square miles (0.6 acres), or 0.09%, are water. The east half of the city drains to the Gasconade River, a north-flowing tributary of the Missouri River, while the west half drains to Fly Creek, a north-flowing tributary of the Maries River and part of the Osage River watershed leading north to the Missouri.

=== Climate ===
Climate data for Vienna, Missouri (2 mi WNW), (1991-2020)
Month	Jan	Feb	Mar	Apr	May	Jun	Jul	Aug	Sep	Oct	Nov	Dec	Year
Mean daily maximum °F (°C)	43.6 (6.4)	48.8 (9.3)	59.3 (15.2)	70.1 (21.2)	78.2 (25.7)	86.1 (30.1)	90.7 (32.6)	89.9 (32.2)	82.2 (27.9)	71.2 (21.8)	58.2 (14.6)	47.8 (8.8)	68.8 (20.5)
Daily mean °F (°C)	33.9 (1.1)	38.5 (3.6)	47.5 (8.6)	57.8 (14.3)	66.8 (19.3)	75.3 (24.1)	79.6 (26.4)	78.1 (25.6)	69.8 (21.0)	58.6 (14.8)	47.4 (8.6)	37.7 (3.2)	57.6 (14.2)
Mean daily minimum °F (°C)	24.2 (−4.3)	28.2 (−2.1)	35.6 (2.0)	45.6 (7.6)	55.4 (13.0)	64.5 (18.1)	68.6 (20.3)	66.4 (19.1)	57.5 (14.2)	46.0 (7.8)	36.5 (2.5)	27.7 (−2.4)	46.4 (8.0)
Average precipitation inches (mm)	2.47 (63)	2.24 (57)	3.57 (91)	4.67 (119)	4.87 (124)	5.17 (131)	4.61 (117)	3.81 (97)	4.01 (102)	2.92 (74)	3.57 (91)	3.02 (77)	44.93 (1,143)
Average snowfall inches (cm)	4.8 (12)	3.1 (7.9)	1.6 (4.1)	0.2 (0.51)	0.0 (0.0)	0.0 (0.0)	0.0 (0.0)	0.0 (0.0)	0.0 (0.0)	0.0 (0.0)	0.9 (2.3)	3.6 (9.1)	14.2 (35.91)
Average extreme snow depth inches (cm)	3 (7.6)	3 (7.6)	2 (5.1)	0 (0)	0 (0)	0 (0)	0 (0)	0 (0)	0 (0)	0 (0)	1 (2.5)	2 (5.1)	3 (7.6)
Average precipitation days (≥ 0.01 in)	7.4	6.5	9.0	10.2	10.6	9.0	8.4	7.0	7.2	7.6	8.0	7.8	98.7
Average snowy days (≥ 0.1 in)	2	2	1	0	0	0	0	0	0	0	0	2	7
Source: NOAA, (snow 1980-2011)

== Education ==
Maries County R-I School District, which covers the municipality, operates one elementary school in the community and Vienna High School.

Vienna has a public library, a branch of the Heartland Regional Library System.

== See also ==
- List of cities in Missouri
