= Charles Schlottach =

American politician

Charles Schlottach (born October 12, 1955, in Washington, Missouri) is a former Missouri State Representative. He is a Republican and was elected in 2002, 2004, 2006, and 2008. He represented District 111 (parts of Crawford, Franklin, Gasconade counties including the areas of New Haven, Rosebud, Gerald, and Sullivan).

Schlottach and his family own and operate the White Mule Winery and Bed and Breakfast near Owensville, Missouri.
