= Crider =

Crider may refer to:

== Places ==
- Crider, Kentucky
- Crider, Missouri
- Crider Creek, a stream in Osage and Gasconade counties of central Missouri
- Criders, Virginia, Criders is an unincorporated community located in Rockingham County, in the U.S. state of Virginia. It is located in George Washington National Forest, west of Bergton near the state border with West Virginia

== People ==
- Bill Crider (1941–2018), American author
- Cori Crider, attorney and activist
- Curtis Crider (1930–2012), American stock car racing driver
- Frank Crider (1907–1962), American football player and coach
- Harry Crider (born 1999), American football player
- Jerry Crider (1941–2008), baseball pitcher
- John Crider (born 1933), politician and lawyer
- Michael Crider, Republican member of the Indiana Senate
- Michèle Crider (born 1959), operatic soprano
- Norman Crider (1938–2009), baton-twirling champion and shop proprietor

== Other uses ==
- Honda Crider, an automobile
- Crider (soil), the state soil of Kentucky
