= Third Creek =

Stream in the U.S. state of Missouri

Third Creek is a stream in Gasconade and Osage counties of central Missouri. It is a tributary of the Gasconade River.

The stream headwaters are in Gasconade County at 38°21′47″N 91°29′33″W and the confluence with the Gasconade is in Osage County at 38°25′54″N 91°40′02″W. The stream source is just west of Missouri Route 19 north of Owensville. The stream flows northwest past Old Woollam and, after passing under Missouri Routes P and A, it gains the flow of its southern tributary Crider Creek, and enters Osage County about 1.5 mile before it joins the Gasconade at Cooper Hill.

Third Creek was named for the fact it is the third in order of tributaries on the Gasconade River from the nearby Missouri River.

== See also ==
- List of rivers of Missouri
