= Christian Keller =

Christian Keller may refer to:

- Christian Keller (swimmer) (born 1972), German Olympic swimmer
- Christian Keller (sports administrator) (born 1976), German academic and sports administrator
- Christian Keller (footballer) (born 1980), Danish footballer
- Christian Keller (physician) (born 1858), Danish physician

== See also ==
- Christian and Anna Keller Farmstead, a historic home and farm in Franklin County, Missouri
