= Gerald, Missouri =

- City
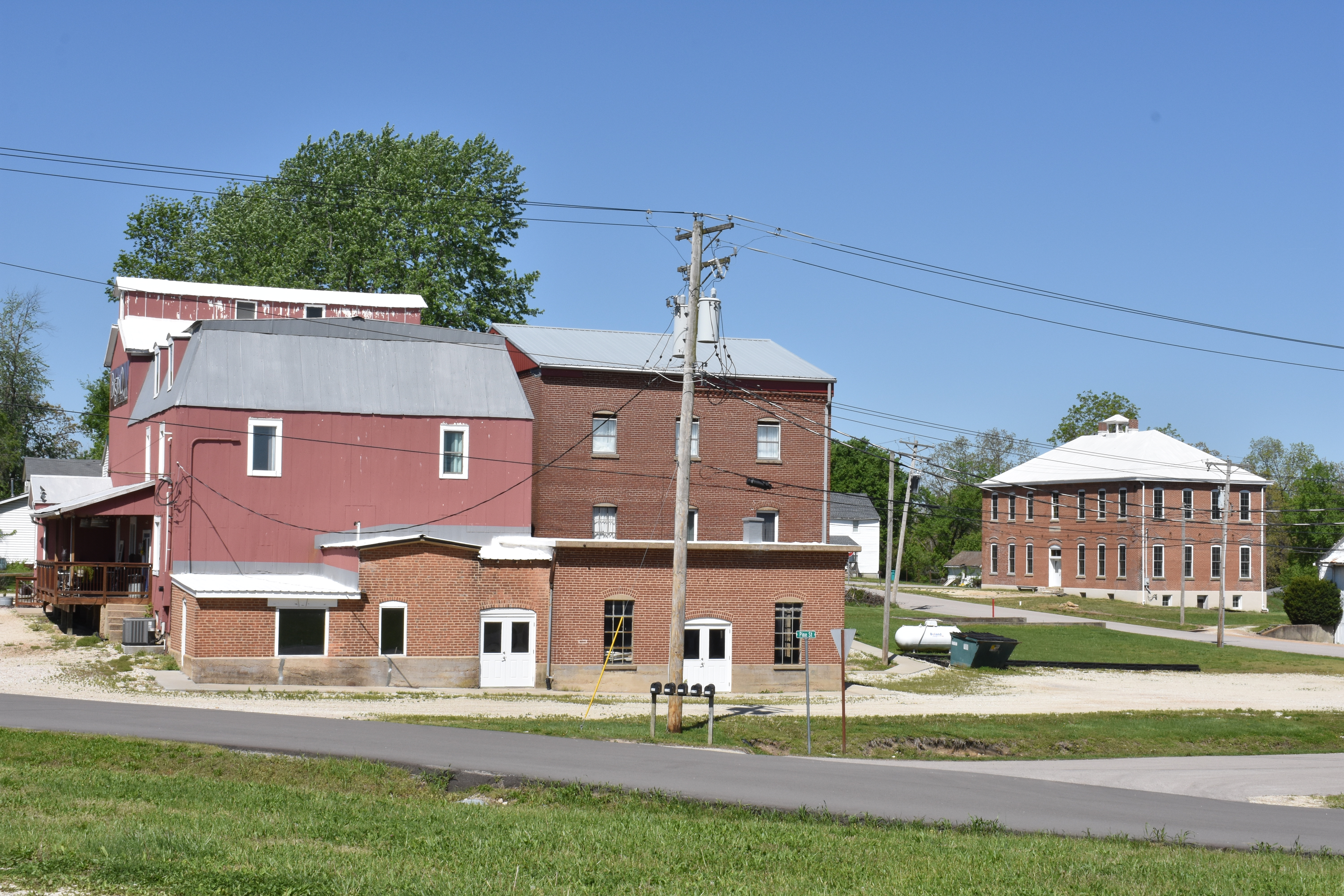
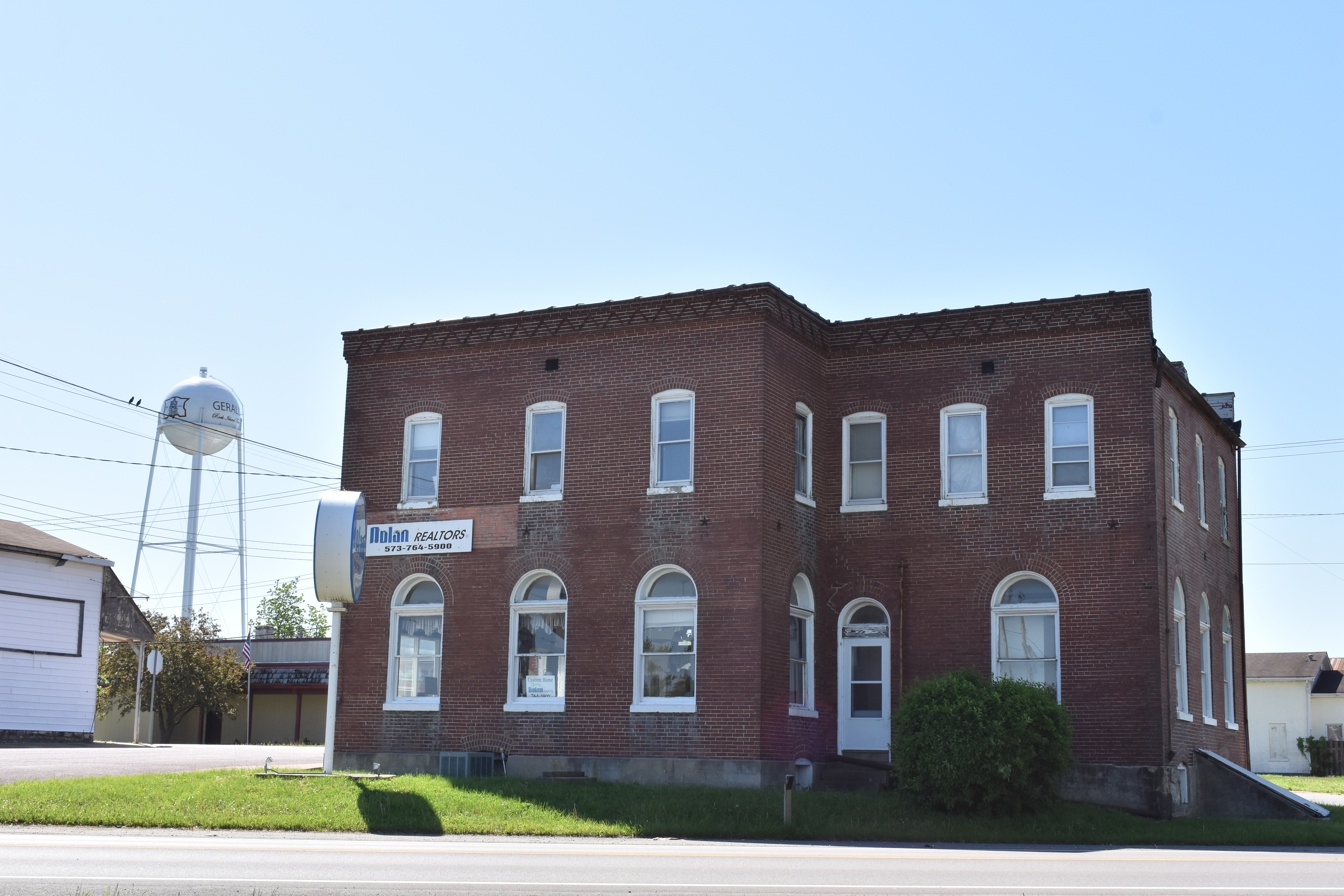
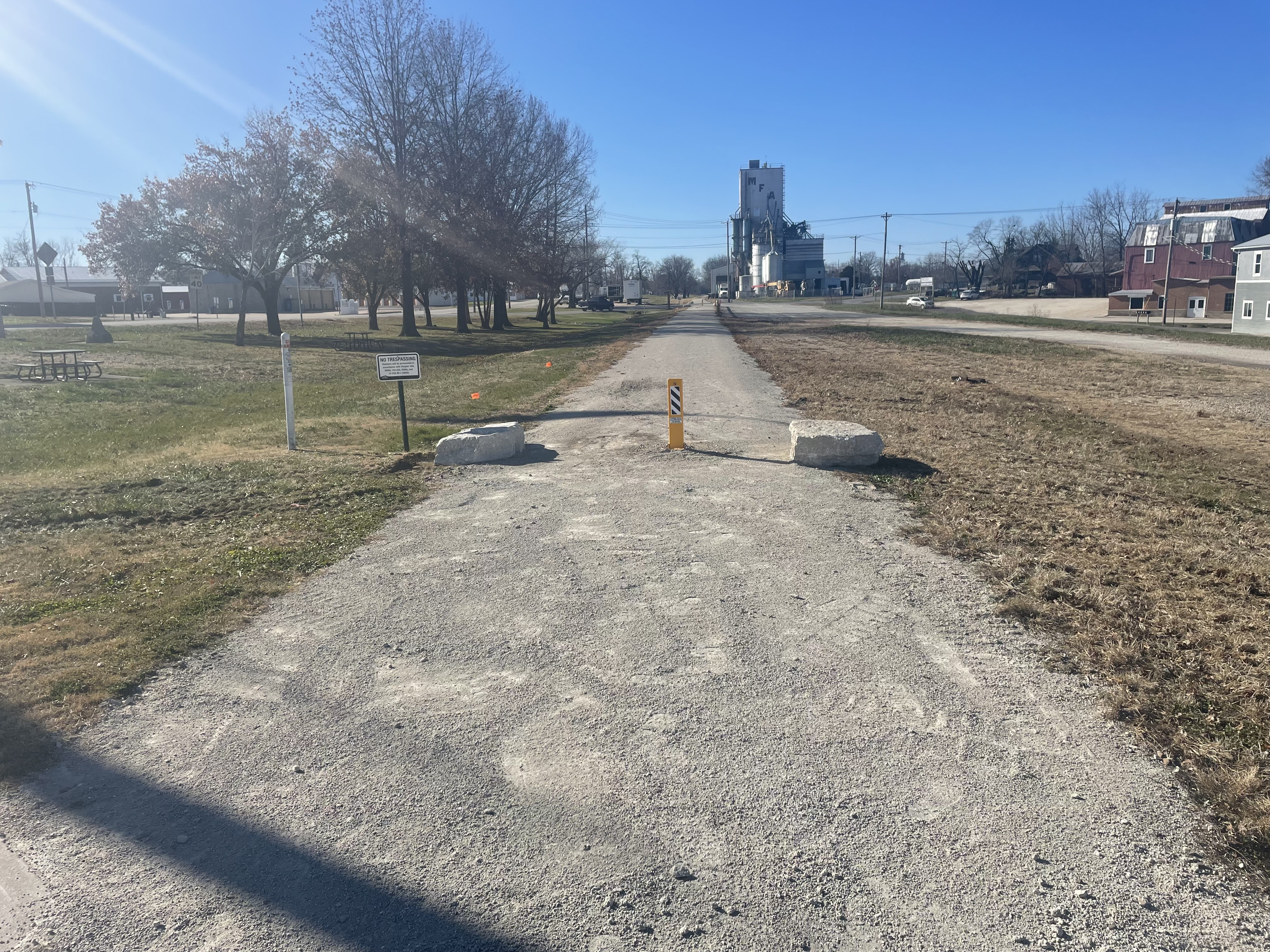
- Gerald Roller Mill & Old School 339 S Main St, built 1910 Rock Island Trail State Park in Gerald

- Location of Gerald, Missouri
- Coordinates: 38°23′57″N 91°19′50″W
- Country: United States
- State: Missouri
- County: Franklin

Government
  - Mayor: Corey Novotney

Area
  - Total: 1.49 sq mi (3.85 km^{2})
  - Land: 1.48 sq mi (3.83 km^{2})
  - Water: 0.0077 sq mi (0.02 km^{2})
- Elevation: 906 ft (276 m)

Population (2020)
  - Total: 1,361
  - Density: 921.0/sq mi (355.61/km^{2})
- Time zone: UTC-6 (Central (CST))
  - Summer (DST): UTC-5 (CDT)
- ZIP code: 63037
- Area code: 573
- FIPS code: 29-26866
- GNIS feature ID: 2394884
- Website: geraldmo.com

Gerald is a city in western Franklin County, Missouri, United States. The population was 1,361 at the 2020 census.

== History ==
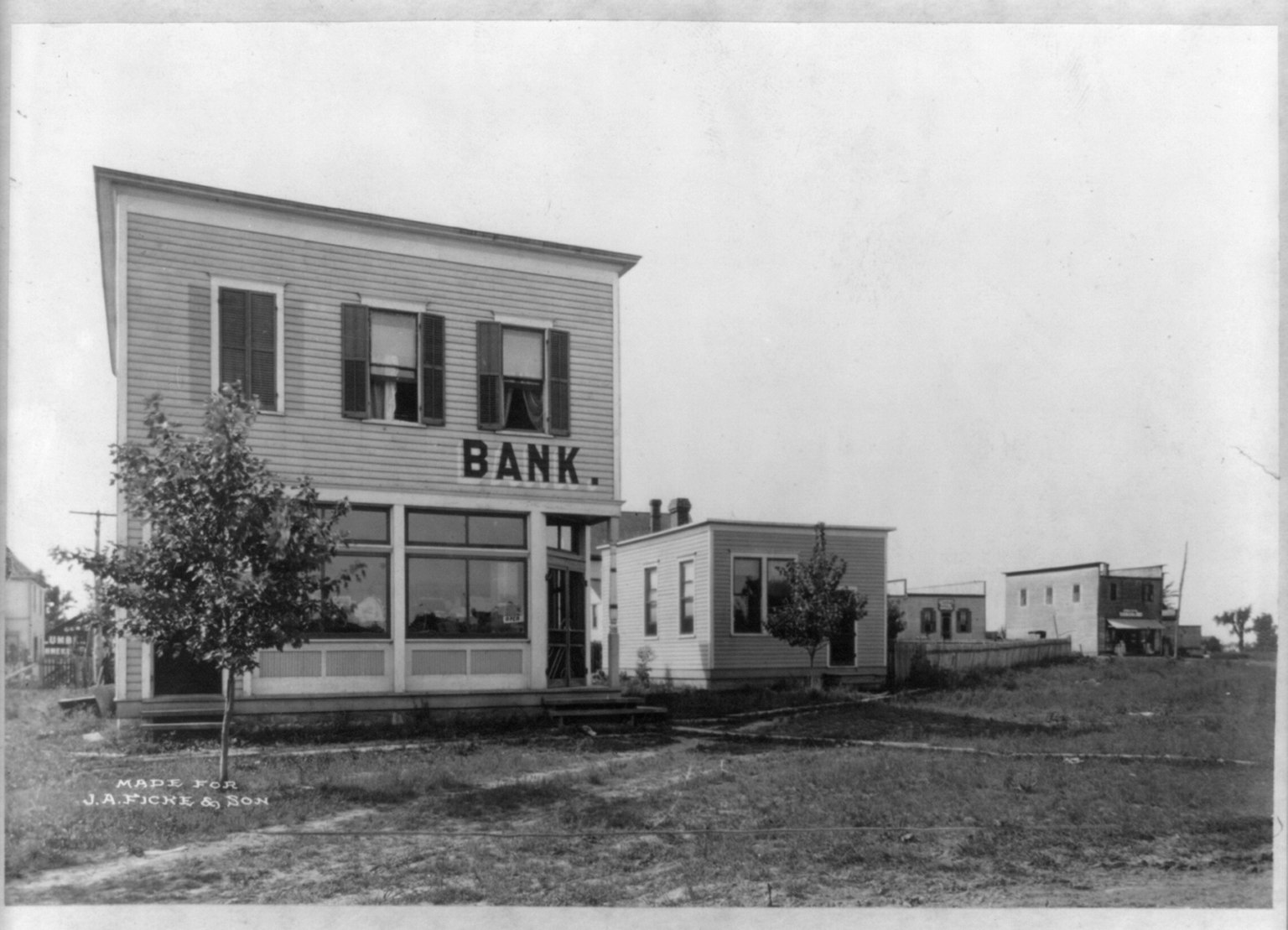
Bank of Gerald, 1913

Gerald was platted in 1901 along a railroad line. The community was named after the local Fitzgerald family. A post office called Gerald has been in operation since 1901.

The Christian and Anna Keller Farmstead and Old Gerald School are listed on the National Register of Historic Places.

== Geography ==
Gerald is located along US Route 50 approximately two miles east of the Franklin - Gasconade county line. Rosebud lies four miles to the west and Leslie five miles east along Route 50.

According to the United States Census Bureau, the city has a total area of 1.49 square miles (3.86 km^{2}), of which 1.48 square miles (3.83 km^{2}) is land and 0.01 square miles (0.03 km^{2}) is water.

== Demographics ==
Historical population
Census	Pop.	Note	%±
1910	225		—
1920	246		9.3%
1930	344		39.8%
1940	371		7.8%
1950	429		15.6%
1960	474		10.5%
1970	762		60.8%
1980	921		20.9%
1990	888		−3.6%
2000	1,171		31.9%
2010	1,345		14.9%
2020	1,361		1.2%
U.S. Decennial Census

=== 2010 census ===
As of the census of 2010, there were 1,345 people, 527 households, and 356 families living in the city. The population density was 908.8 inhabitants per square mile (350.9/km^{2}). There were 603 housing units at an average density of 407.4 per square mile (157.3/km^{2}). The racial makeup of the city was 97.5% White, 0.2% African American, 0.8% Native American, 0.5% Asian, 0.1% from other races, and 0.8% from two or more races. Hispanic or Latino of any race were 0.4% of the population.

There were 527 households, of which 34.0% had children under the age of 18 living with them, 45.5% were married couples living together, 15.4% had a female householder with no husband present, 6.6% had a male householder with no wife present, and 32.4% were non-families. 26.4% of all households were made up of individuals, and 10.6% had someone living alone who was 65 years of age or older. The average household size was 2.50 and the average family size was 2.97.

The median age in the city was 36.6 years. 24.5% of residents were under the age of 18; 9.9% were between the ages of 18 and 24; 26.5% were from 25 to 44; 24.1% were from 45 to 64; and 14.9% were 65 years of age or older. The gender makeup of the city was 48.2% male and 51.8% female.

=== 2000 census ===
As of the census of 2000, there were 1,171 people, 474 households, and 327 families living in the city. The population density was 835.0 inhabitants per square mile (322.4/km^{2}). There were 510 housing units at an average density of 363.6 per square mile (140.4/km^{2}). The racial makeup of the city was 98.21% White, 0.09% African American, 0.17% Native American, 0.43% Asian, 0.09% from other races, and 1.02% from two or more races. Hispanic or Latino of any race were 0.94% of the population.

There were 474 households, out of which 34.0% had children under the age of 18 living with them, 54.4% were married couples living together, 9.1% had a female householder with no husband present, and 31.0% were non-families. 25.7% of all households were made up of individuals, and 11.4% had someone living alone who was 65 years of age or older. The average household size was 2.47 and the average family size was 2.97.

In the city the population was spread out, with 26.8% under the age of 18, 7.8% from 18 to 24, 29.9% from 25 to 44, 20.5% from 45 to 64, and 15.0% who were 65 years of age or older. The median age was 36 years. For every 100 females, there were 95.2 males. For every 100 females age 18 and over, there were 93.9 males.

The median income for a household in the city was $29,095, and the median income for a family was $35,000. Males had a median income of $28,194 versus $21,971 for females. The per capita income for the city was $14,095. About 6.0% of families and 10.6% of the population were below the poverty line, including 7.9% of those under age 18 and 11.5% of those age 65 or over.

== Education ==
It is in the Gasconade County R-II School District.

Gerald has a lending library, the Gerald Area Library.

== Drug Enforcement Administration incident ==
The City of Gerald came into national spotlight in 2008 when it was revealed that Bill A. Jakob, a purported federal agent working for several months with Gerald police to curtail the meth abuse including participating in home raids without a warrant to arrest alleged drug dealers, was actually "an unemployed former trucking company owner, a former security guard, a former wedding minister and a former small-town cop from 23 miles down the road." Jakob came to Gerald in January 2008 and misrepresented himself as an agent of the United States Drug Enforcement Administration to the Gerald police chief. On some other occasions, he claimed to be a United States Marshal or an agent from the United States Department of Justice Multi-Jurisdictional Task Force.

Linda Trest, a staff writer for the Gasconade County Republican acting on reports of concerned citizens, uncovered the truth about Jakob, which ended the scam. After the national press coverage that included The New York Times, The National Inquirer, and The Post-Dispatch, Jacob was interviewed by Katie Couric on 60 Minutes.

In September 2009 Jakob pleaded guilty to impersonating a federal agent. In December 2009 he was sentenced to serve 5 years in prison.
