= Bland, Missouri =

- City
- City of Bland
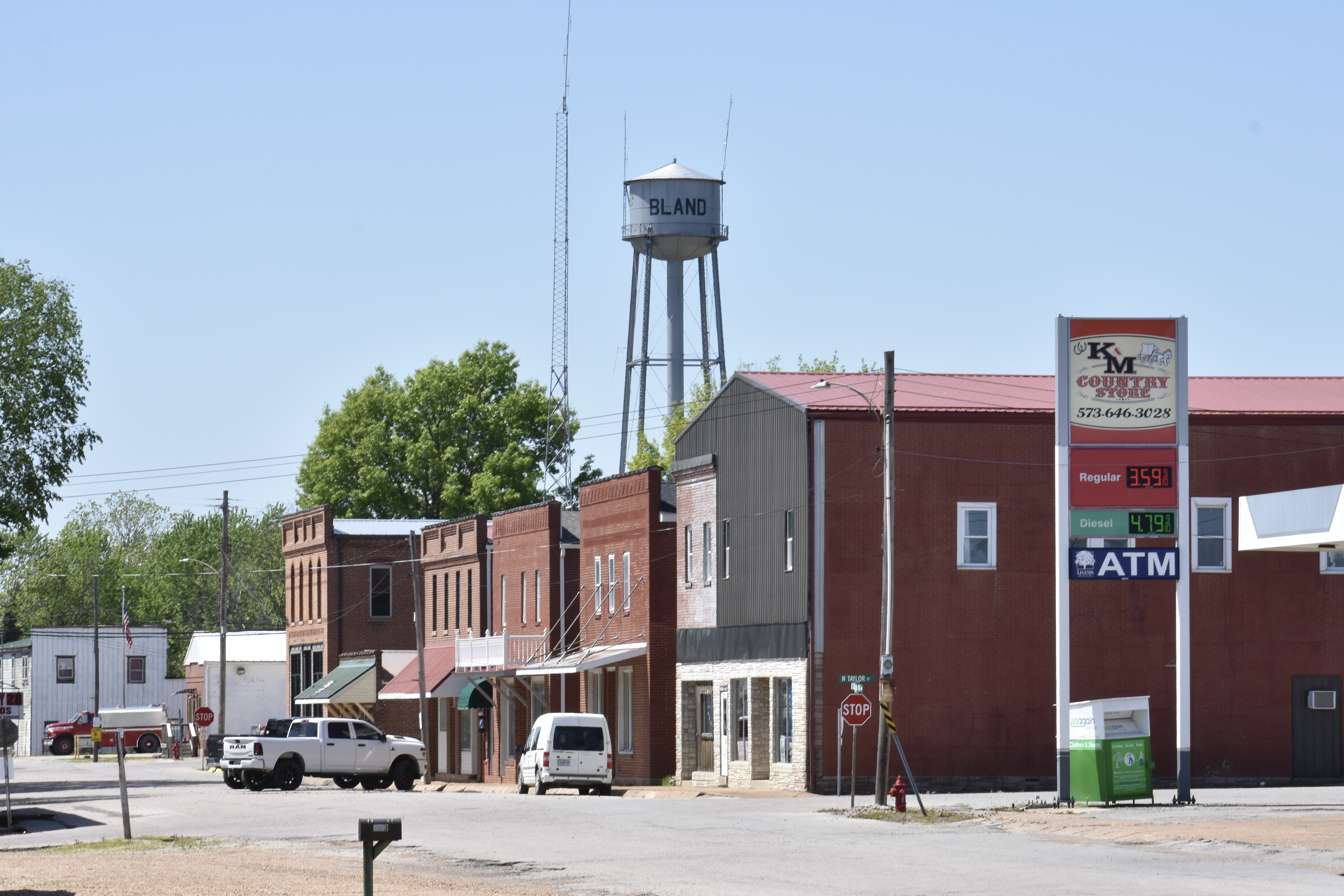
- Downtown Bland

- Location of Bland, Missouri
- Coordinates: 38°18′02″N 91°37′59″W
- Country: United States
- State: Missouri
- Counties: Gasconade, Osage
- Incorporated: 1877
- Named for: U.S. Congressman Richard P. Bland

Area
  - Total: 0.64 sq mi (1.67 km^{2})
  - Land: 0.64 sq mi (1.67 km^{2})
  - Water: 0 sq mi (0.00 km^{2})
- Elevation: 997 ft (304 m)

Population (2020)
  - Total: 506
  - Density: 784.3/sq mi (302.82/km^{2})
- Time zone: UTC-6 (Central (CST))
  - Summer (DST): UTC-5 (CDT)
- ZIP codes: 65014, 65062
- Area code: 573
- FIPS code: 29-06256
- GNIS feature ID: 2394190

Bland is a city in Gasconade and Osage counties in the U.S. state of Missouri. The population was 506 at the 2020 census.

The Osage County portion of Bland is part of the Jefferson City, Missouri Metropolitan Statistical Area.

== Geography ==
According to the United States Census Bureau, the city has a total land area of 0.65 square miles (1.68 km^{2}), all land.

== History ==
A post office called Bland has been in operation since 1877. The town is named in honor of U.S. Congressman Richard Parks Bland, a United States Representative from various districts in south central Missouri. Bland was a practicing attorney in Rolla in neighboring Phelps County.

In 2020, the independent short film SCP: Overlord was filmed in Bland. The film takes place in the SCP Foundation universe. The film was directed by Stephen Hancock of Altavision. The film also starred Noah Bryan. The movie would go on to win 5 awards at the Tampa Bay Underground Film Festival, including Best Short Film and Best Sci-Fi/Fantasy Film. It would also go on to win Best Short Film at Sunscreen Film Festival.

== Demographics ==
Historical population
| Census | Pop. | Note | %± |
|---|---|---|---|
| 1910 | 359 | | — |
| 1920 | 470 | | 30.9% |
| 1930 | 577 | | 22.8% |
| 1940 | 565 | | −2.1% |
| 1950 | 596 | | 5.5% |
| 1960 | 654 | | 9.7% |
| 1970 | 621 | | −5.0% |
| 1980 | 662 | | 6.6% |
| 1990 | 651 | | −1.7% |
| 2000 | 565 | | −13.2% |
| 2010 | 539 | | −4.6% |
| 2020 | 506 | | −6.1% |
U.S. Decennial Census

=== 2010 census ===
As of the census of 2010, there were 539 people, 230 households, and 142 families living in the city. The population density was 829.2 inhabitants per square mile (320.2/km^{2}). There were 292 housing units at an average density of 449.2 per square mile (173.4/km^{2}). The racial makeup of the city was 97.6% White, 0.6% Native American, 0.6% Asian, 0.2% from other races, and 1.1% from two or more races. Hispanic or Latino of any race were 0.6% of the population.

There were 230 households, of which 29.1% had children under the age of 18 living with them, 41.7% were married couples living together, 15.2% had a female householder with no husband present, 4.8% had a male householder with no wife present, and 38.3% were non-families. 33.0% of all households were made up of individuals, and 13.5% had someone living alone who was 65 years of age or older. The average household size was 2.34 and the average family size was 2.96.

The median age in the city was 41.9 years. 23.6% of residents were under the age of 18; 8.4% were between the ages of 18 and 24; 20.7% were from 25 to 44; 30.6% were from 45 to 64; and 16.7% were 65 years of age or older. The gender makeup of the city was 51.8% male and 48.2% female.

=== 2000 census ===
As of the census of 2000, there were 565 people, 247 households, and 142 families living in the city. The population density was 880.6 inhabitants per square mile (340.0/km^{2}). There were 299 housing units at an average density of 466.0 per square mile (179.9/km^{2}). The racial makeup of the city was 97.88% White, 0.18% African American, 0.18% from other races, and 1.77% from two or more races.

There were 247 households, out of which 29.1% had children under the age of 18 living with them, 44.9% were married couples living together, 10.9% had a female householder with no husband present, and 42.5% were non-families. 37.2% of all households were made up of individuals, and 21.5% had someone living alone who was 65 years of age or older. The average household size was 2.26 and the average family size was 2.94.

In the city the population was spread out, with 24.1% under the age of 18, 8.0% from 18 to 24, 28.7% from 25 to 44, 22.3% from 45 to 64, and 17.0% who were 65 years of age or older. The median age was 39 years. For every 100 females, there were 92.2 males. For every 100 females age 18 and over, there were 94.1 males.

The median income for a household in the city was $26,667, and the median income for a family was $34,659. Males had a median income of $24,286 versus $18,977 for females. The per capita income for the city was $13,102. About 5.3% of families and 11.5% of the population were below the poverty line, including 12.8% of those under age 18 and 21.8% of those age 65 or over.

== City services ==
With a membership of about 20 volunteer firefighters, the Bland Fire Protection District operates firehouses in Bland and neighboring Redbird.

== Education ==
It is in the Maries County R-II School District.

== Notable residents ==
- Ray Steiner, basketball player
