= Alexander Wehrle =

German sports administrator (born 1975)

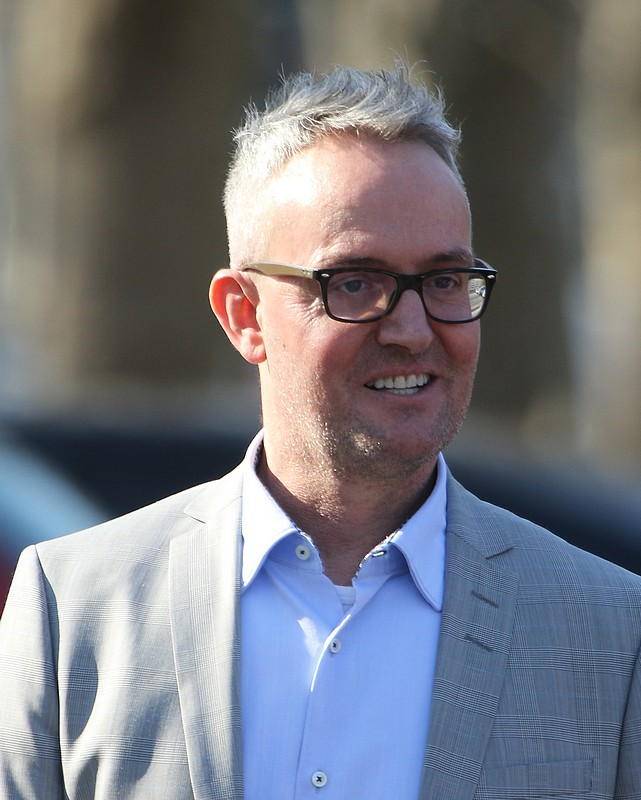
- Wehrle in 2022
- Born: 11 February 1975 (age 50); Bietigheim-Bissingen, Baden-Württemberg, West Germany
- Education: University of Konstanz; University of Limerick
- Occupation: Sports administrator
- Employer(s): VfB Stuttgart; 1. FC Köln
- Organization: Deutsche Fußball Liga

Alexander Wehrle ([ˌalɛˈksandɐ veːɐ̯lə]; born 11 February 1975) is a German sports administrator who has served as the chairman of Bundesliga club VfB Stuttgart since 2022. From 2013 to 2022, he worked as the managing director of 1. FC Köln. Wehrle is part of the executive committee of the Deutsche Fußball Liga.

== Early life and education ==
Alexander Wehrle was born in 1975 in Bietigheim-Bissingen, a town in the German state of Baden-Württemberg. In his youth, he played as a right winger at the local football club TV Möglingen and was considered for a move to the academy of VfB Stuttgart. However, his parents decided against the move because they wanted their son to focus on his studies. Wehrle went on to study administrative science, management, and public policy at the University of Konstanz and the University of Limerick.

== Career in football ==
From 2003 to 2013, Wehrle worked as an advisor to the board of VfB Stuttgart. In 2013, he was appointed managing director at 1. FC Köln who at the time played in Germany's 2. Bundesliga. His tenure at the club was a successful one; it involved the transfer of the French forward Anthony Modeste to Chinese Super League club Tianjin Tianhai F.C. for a reported fee of around €30 million. Modeste later re-joined the club on a free transfer. Since 2019, Wehrle has served on the executive committee of the Deutsche Fußball Liga.

On 22 December 2021, it was announced that Wehrle would leave his position at Köln in April 2022 to succeed Thomas Hitzlsperger as the chairman of the board of VfB Stuttgart. Although Wehrle had been under contract until 2023, his release from the club was made possible after Köln hired Philipp Türoff and Christian Keller as managing directors. He took up his position at Stuttgart on 21 March 2022.

== Bibliography ==
- Fischer, Christoph (22 December 2021). "Alexander Wehrle wird Vorstandsvorsitzender beim VfB Stuttgart". Reutlinger Generalanzeiger (in German).
- Holbein, Johannes (22 December 2021). "Alexander Wehrle – Vergangenheit und Zukunft beim VfB Stuttgart". swr.de (in German).
- Lußem, Frank (22 December 2021). "Ein Mann, den man eigentlich nicht gehen lassen darf". kicker.de (in German).
- Urbina, Carlos (20 March 2022). "Alexander Wehrle bezieht sein neues Büro". Stuttgarter Nachrichten (in German).
