= Redbird, Missouri =

Unincorporated community in Missouri, United States

Coordinates: 38°10′54″N 91°34′14″W

Redbird is an unincorporated community in southern Gasconade County, Missouri, United States. The community lies on Price Creek, a small tributary of the Bourbeuse River and approximately one half mile southwest of the Bourbeuse. Owensville lies about eleven miles to the north-northeast and St. James lies about twelve miles to the south-southwest.

== History ==
Redbird (or Red Bird) was so named by its first postmaster, because he thought it would be an easy name to spell and remember.
