= Little Berger, Missouri =

Unincorporated community in Missouri, United States

Coordinates: 38°37′17″N 91°23′40″W

Little Berger is an unincorporated community in Gasconade County, in the U.S. state of Missouri.

== History ==
A post office called Little Berger was established in 1872, and remained in operation until 1901. The community takes its name from nearby Little Berger Creek.
