= Fredericksburg, Missouri =

Unincorporated community in Missouri, United States

Coordinates: 38°36′27″N 91°38′30″W

Fredericksburg is an unincorporated community in Gasconade County, in the U.S. state of Missouri.

== History ==
A post office called Fredericksburg (Fredericksburgh) was established prior September 30, 1865, by George Hopkins, an emigrant from Heyshott, Sussex, England. At the time it was listed as being in Fredericksburgh, Gasconade County, Missouri. It remained in operation until 1922. The community derives its name from the Fredericks family, pioneer citizens.
