= Swiss, Missouri =

Unincorporated community in Missouri, U.S.

Coordinates: 38°33′46″N 91°28′17″W

Swiss is an unincorporated community in Gasconade County, Missouri, United States. It lies at an elevation of 906 feet (276 m), along Missouri Highway 19 roughly 12 miles south of Hermann. The village was originally founded by immigrants from Switzerland, hence its name.
