= List of Kentucky state symbols =

Iconography of the Commonwealth of Kentucky

Location of the Commonwealth of Kentucky in the United States of America

The Commonwealth of Kentucky has 29 official state emblems, as well as other designated places and events. The majority are determined by acts of the Kentucky General Assembly and recorded in Title I, Chapter 2 of the Kentucky Revised Statutes. The state's nickname – "The Bluegrass State" – is traditional, but has never been passed into law by the General Assembly. It does, however, appear on the state's license plates. Despite the nickname's popularity, the General Assembly has not designated bluegrass (or any other grass) as the official state grass.

The first symbol was the Seal of Kentucky, which was made official in 1792. The original seal also contained the future state motto. It served as the state's only emblem for over 130 years until the adoption of the state bird in 1926. Enacted by law in 2026, the newest symbols of Kentucky are the state amphibian, the eastern hellbender, the state dog, the Treeing Walker Coonhound, the state nongame mammal, the eastern spotted skunk, and the state mushroom, the indigo milkcap.

== Insignia ==
Type	Symbol	Description	Year	Image	Source
Flag	The Flag of Kentucky	Kentucky's flag has a navy blue field with the Seal of Kentucky in the middle.	1928	Kentucky flag	
Latin motto	Deo gratiam habeamus	"Let us be grateful to God"	2002	—	
Motto	United we stand, divided we fall		1942	—	
Nickname	The Bluegrass State	The bluegrass that grows in the state's pasture land	Traditional	—	
Seal	The Seal of Kentucky	Kentucky's seal depicts two men embracing, the state motto and two sprigs of goldenrod.	1792	Kentucky State Seal	
Slogan	Kentucky Unbridled Spirit	The slogan alludes to Kentucky's reputation in horse racing and horse farms, as well as its production of whiskey.	2004	—	

== Species ==
Type	Symbol	Description	Year	Image	Source
Amphibian	Eastern hellbender Cryptobranchus alleganiensis	The eastern hellbender is native to the eastern United States, including Kentucky, and is of the greatest conservation concern.	2026	Hellbender	
Bird	Cardinal; Cardinalis cardinalis	The male cardinal is bright red and the female is brown and dull red. They live in Kentucky year-round.	1926	Cardinal	
Butterfly	Viceroy butterfly Limenitis archippus	Viceroys are a Müllerian mimic to the monarchs which birds avoid eating because they are toxic and distasteful. The butterfly is usually found all over the state, except in mountainous areas, from April until November.	1990	Viceroy butterfly	
Dog	Treeing Walker Coonhound	The Treeing Walker Coonhound breed was developed by two breeders from Madison County in the 19th century through selective breeding of foxhounds.	2026	Treeing Walker Coonhound	
Fish	Kentucky spotted bass Micropterus punctulatus	Similar to the largemouth bass, a common sporting fish that usually weighs up to 5 pounds (2.3 kg).	2005		
Flower	Goldenrod; Solidago gigantea	The goldenrod has a yellow flower that blooms in late summer and early fall. It is also the state flower of Nebraska.	1926	Goldenrod	
Fruit	Blackberry; Rubus allegheniensis	This soft fruit is used to make jams, seedless jellies and wine.	2004		
Horse	Thoroughbred; Equus caballus	A horse breed best known for its use in horse racing. Over 30% of all U.S. thoroughbred births happen in Kentucky, more than any other state.	1996		
Insect	Honey bee Apis mellifera	Official state insect of seventeen states, including Kentucky.	2010		
Nongame mammal	Eastern spotted skunk Spilogale putorius	The eastern spotted skunk is native to much of the central and southern United States, including Kentucky, and is considered of high conservation concern.	2026	Eastern spotted skunk	
Mushroom	Indigo milkcap Lactarius indigo	The indigo milkcap is a distinctive edible wild mushroom that is bright blue, recalling Kentucky's fame as the Bluegrass State. It makes ectomycorrhizal connections with the root tips of certain trees, trading key nutrients for sugars from the trees.	2026	A blue milkcap mushroom (*Lactarius indigo*) is pictured flipped upside-down, with its gills up, in a Kentucky forest.	
Tree	Tulip poplar Liriodendron tulipifera	The tulip tree is also called the yellow poplar. It has a distinctive leaf shape and yellow, bell-shaped flowers.	1994	Tulip poplar tree	
Wild animal game species	Eastern gray squirrel Sciurus carolinensis	Predominantly gray fur but it can have a reddish, black or white color. It has a white underside and a large bushy tail.	1968	Eastern grey squirrell	

== Geology ==
Type	Symbol	Description	Year	Image	Source
Fossil	Brachiopod	Brachiopods are the most collected fossil in Kentucky. They resemble clams, but their top and bottom shell are not identical, and they do not burrow into the sand.	1986	Abyssal Brachiopod	
Gemstone	Freshwater pearl	The pearl is formed in several species of freshwater mussels. Originally found all over Kentucky, increased pollution, over-harvesting and damming of rivers have severely depleted the population of freshwater mussels.	1986	Pearl	
Mineral	Coal	Kentucky is the third leading state in coal production.	1998	Coal	
Rock	Kentucky agate	Agate, a form of quartz, has varying shades of color arranged in layers of red, black, yellow, and gray.	2000		
Soil	Crider Soil Series	The Crider soils make up about 500,000 acres (2,000 km^{2}) in Kentucky. Most areas are used for crops or pasture for corn, small grain, soybeans, tobacco, and hay.	1990		

== Cultural ==
Type	Symbol	Description	Year	Image	Source
Beverage	Milk		2005	A glass of milk	
Soft Drink	Ale-8-One	Kentucky House Bill 205 of the 2013 Regular Session signed by Governor (Acts Chapter 85) designated this regional, and historical citrus soda as a state symbol, the official soft drink of the Commonwealth of Kentucky.	2013		
Bluegrass song	"Blue Moon of Kentucky" by Bill Monroe	Kentucky native Bill Monroe wrote this song in 1947 and performed it soon thereafter. Elvis Presley sang the song when he auditioned for the Grand Ole Opry and later recorded it for his first single for Sun Records.	1988		
Dance	Clogging	Clogging in the southern U.S. has its roots from early settlers. English clogging, Irish jigs, African-American buck dance and Cherokee dance.	2006	Couple of women dancing	
Gun	The Kentucky Long Rifle		2013	Kentucky Long Rifle	
Language	English	Over 95% of the state's residents are able to speak English.	1984	—	
Locomotive	Louisville & Nashville 152	The oldest surviving 4-6-2 "Pacific", built in 1905. It is preserved at the Kentucky Railway Museum.	2000		
Music	Bluegrass music	But it wasn't called bluegrass back then. It was just called old time mountain hillbilly music. When they started doing the bluegrass festivals in 1965, everybody got together and wanted to know what to call the show, y'know. It was decided that since Bill was the oldest man, and was from the Bluegrass state of Kentucky and he had the Blue Grass Boys, it would be called 'bluegrass.' — Don Harrison,	2007	Women playing the banjo, guitar, bass and violin	
Musical instrument	Appalachian dulcimer	A stringed instrument that appeared in the south in the early 19th century	2001	Five stringed instruments	
Silverware pattern	Old Kentucky Blue Grass-The Georgetown Pattern		1996	—	
Song	"My Old Kentucky Home"	The song describes life on a Kentucky plantation.	1928		
Sports car	Chevrolet Corvette	Since 1981, the Chevrolet Corvette has been manufactured in Bowling Green.	2010		
