= Ray Steiner =

American basketball player

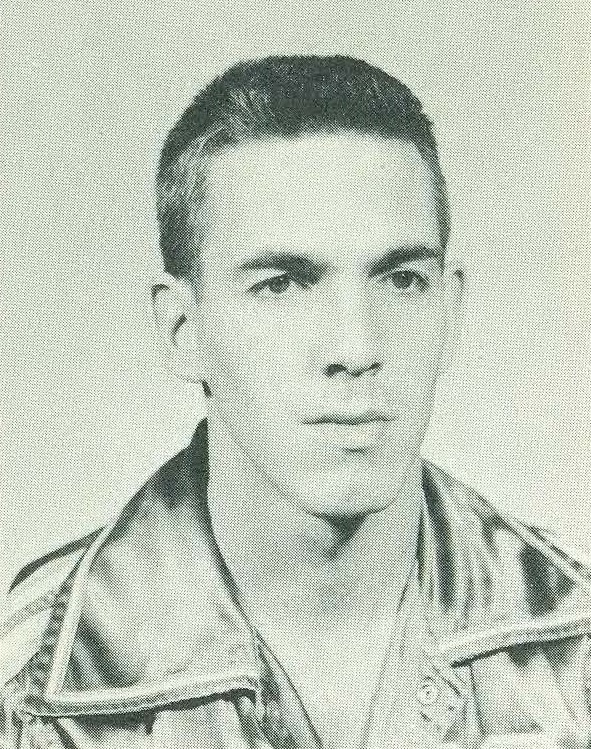
- Steiner with the Phillips 66ers, c. 1956

Personal information
- Born: Bland, Missouri, U.S.
- Listed height: 5 ft 11 in (1.80 m)
- Listed weight: 175 lb (79 kg)

Career information
- High school: Bland (Bland, Missouri)
- College: Moberly Area CC (1949–1950); Saint Louis (1950–1952)
- NBA draft: 1952: – round, –
- Drafted by: Rochester Royals
- Position: Point guard

Career highlights
- Third-team All-American – AP, UPI (1952); First-team All-MVC (1952)
- Stats at Basketball Reference

Ray G. Steiner is a retired American basketball player, best known for his All-American college career at Saint Louis University.

Stenier, a 5-foot-11-inch (1.80 m) point guard from Bland, Missouri, started at the University of Missouri, then transferred to Moberly Area Community College in the 1949–50 season, leading the Greyhounds to the 1950 junior college state title. From there, Steiner transferred to Saint Louis for his final two seasons of eligibility.

After placing on the All-Missouri Valley Conference (MVC) second team as a junior, Steiner stepped up his game in his senior season. He drew acclaim in the regular season as he sparked the Billikens to a 61–60 win over top-ranked Kentucky in the Sugar Bowl Classic. He led SLU to the school's first NCAA tournament berth and at the conclusion of the season was named unanimously to the All-MVC first team and placed on the AP and UPI third All-America teams.

Following his graduation from SLU, Steiner was drafted by the Rochester Royals in the 1952 NBA draft. Instead he chose to play for the Phillips 66ers in the Amateur Athletic Union. After his playing days were over, he remained with Phillips Petroleum Company.
