= Cleavesville, Missouri =

Unincorporated community in Missouri, United States

Coordinates: 38°16′22″N 91°36′07″W

Cleavesville is an unincorporated community in Gasconade County, in the U.S. state of Missouri.

== History ==
A post office called Cleavesville was established in 1854, and remained in operation until 1908. The community derives its name from Cleveland Luster, an early merchant.
