= Crider Creek =

River in Missouri, United States of America

Crider Creek is a stream in Osage and Gasconade counties of central Missouri.

The stream headwaters in southeast Osage County are at 38°18′26″N 91°41′35″W and the confluence with Third Creek in southwest Gasconade County is at 38°24′52″N 91°38′40″W.

Crider Creek has the name of the local Crider family.

== See also ==
- List of rivers of Missouri
