= Old Gerald School =

- U.S. National Register of Historic Places
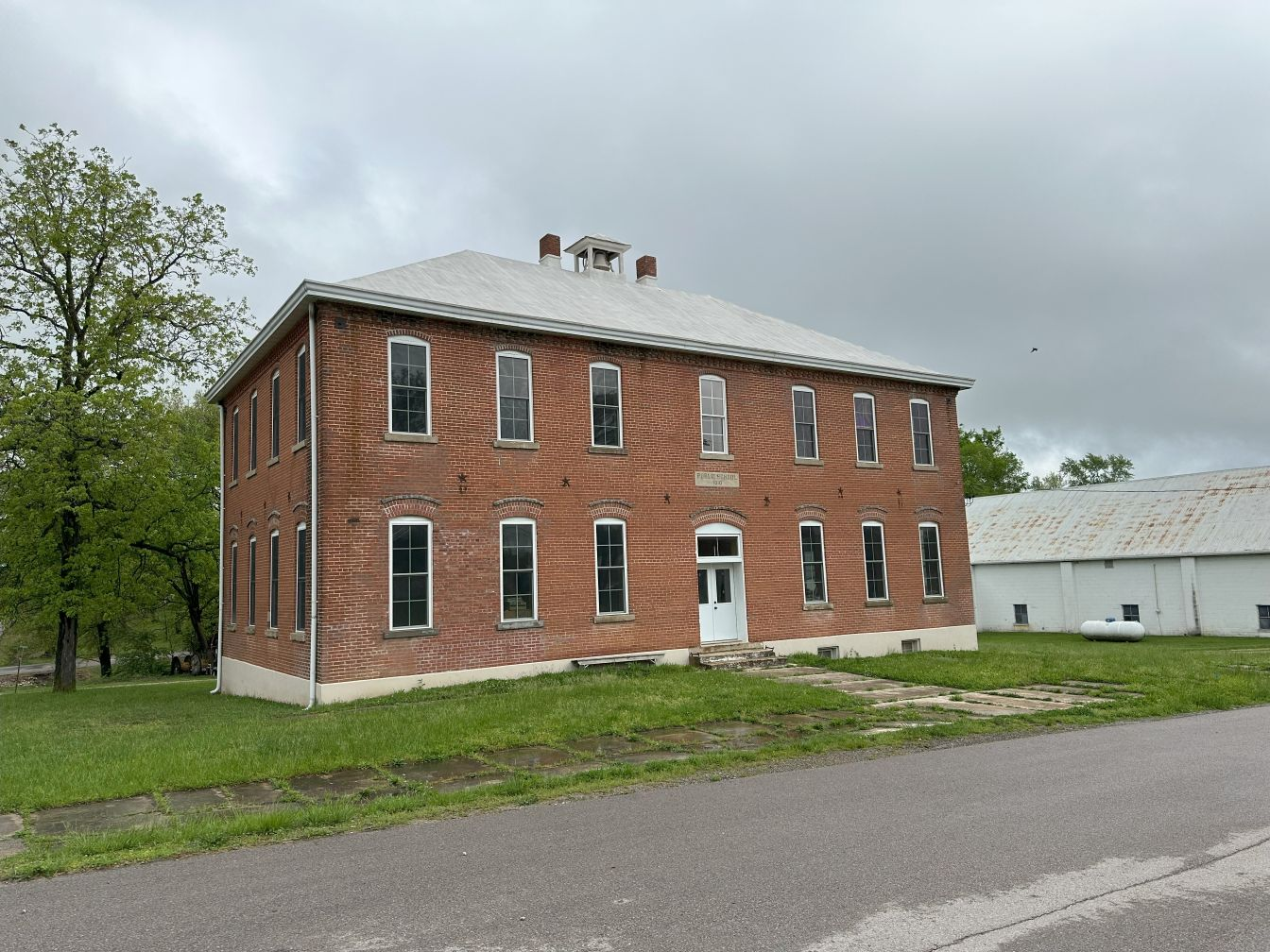

- Location within Missouri Location within the United States
- Location: 111 W. 3rd St., Gerald, Missouri
- Coordinates: 38°24′07″N 91°19′57″W
- Area: Less than 1 acre (0.40 ha)
- Built: 1910, 1948
- Architectural style: Georgian Revival
- NRHP reference No.: 14000375
- Added to NRHP: June 27, 2014

Old Gerald School is a historic school building located at Gerald, Franklin County, Missouri. It was built in 1910, and is a two-story, rectangular brick building with Georgian Revival style design influences. It sits on a concrete foundation, has a hipped roof, and measures 66 feet by 36 feet. A kitchen was added in 1948. The school closed in 1951.

It was listed on the National Register of Historic Places in 2014.
