= Bay, Missouri =

Unincorporated community in Missouri, United States

Coordinates: 38°30′30″N 91°33′31″W

Bay is an unincorporated community in Gasconade County, in the U.S. state of Missouri.

== History ==
A post office called Bay was established in 1860, and remained in operation until 1963. It is not known to the State Historical Society of Missouri why the name "Bay" was applied to this community.

== Notable people ==
- Nathaniel Rateliff, folk singer and songwriter
