= John Crider =

American politician and lawyer

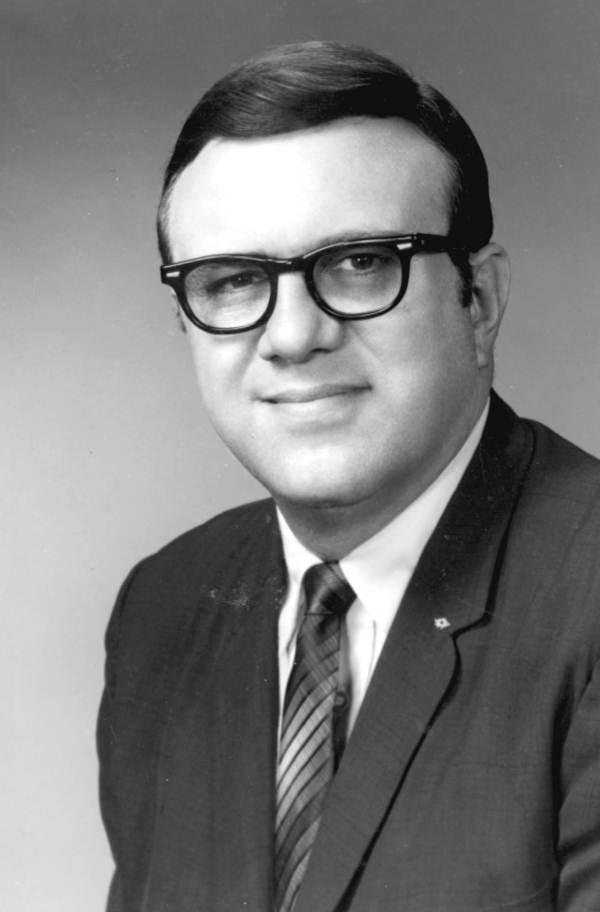

Member of the Florida House of Representatives from the 22nd district
- In office 1966–1970

Personal details
- Born: January 17, 1933 Wichita, Kansas, U.S.
- Died: October 20, 2005 (aged 72) Waynesville, North Carolina, U.S.
- Party: Democratic
- Education: University of Florida
- Occupation: Attorney

Raymond John Crider Jr. (January 17, 1933 – October 20, 2005) was a politician and lawyer in the American state of Florida. He served in the Florida House of Representatives from 1966 to 1970, representing the 22nd district.

== Life ==
Crider was born in Wichita, Kansas. He graduated from the University of Florida in 1955 and in his later years moved from Jacksonville to Crystal River, where he started his own law firm specializing in General Civil Practice.

He was a member of the Legal Aid Society of Jacksonville from 1961 to 1964, period through which he also acted as attorney for the Florida State Beverage Department.

== House of Representatives ==
In 1966 he was elected into the Florida House of Representatives where he served until 1970. While in office, he was part of the Appropriations Committee.

Following his departure from the House of Representatives, Crider gave his services to several distinguished entities such as The Florida Bar, as well as Citrus County and American Bar Associations where he further practiced Government Law.

== Award ==
In 2001, Crider was awarded the Rick B. Quinn Distinguished Citizen Award for his part in creating the Jim LaGrone Park, his two terms as chamber president and his work with then-U.S. Rep. Karen Thurman garnering over $750,000 to build a bike path along Fort Island Trail. He received the Special Recognition national award for Cystic Fibrosis research.

== Death ==
Crider died on October 20, 2005, at the age of 70.
