= Christian and Anna Keller Farmstead =

Historic house in Missouri, United States

- U.S. National Register of Historic Places
- Location within Missouri Location within the United States
- Location: 936 Kohl Country La., near Gerald, Missouri
- Coordinates: 38°25′46.5″N 91°19′15.4″W
- Area: 77 acres (31 ha)
- Built: 1855-1860
- Built by: Keller, Christian
- Architectural style: Mid 19th Century Revival, German bankhouse
- NRHP reference No.: 08000867
- Added to NRHP: August 6, 2009

Christian and Anna Keller Farmstead, also known as the Mel and Ruth Kohl Farmstead , is a historic home and farm located near Gerald, Franklin County, Missouri. The farmhouse was built by German immigrants between about 1855 and 1860, and is a 1 1/2-story banked brick dwelling. Also on the property are the contributing small, two-story, gabled roof barn with a shed-roofed extension and cistern.

It was listed on the National Register of Historic Places in 2009.
