= Christian Keller (sports administrator) =

German sports administrator (born 1976)

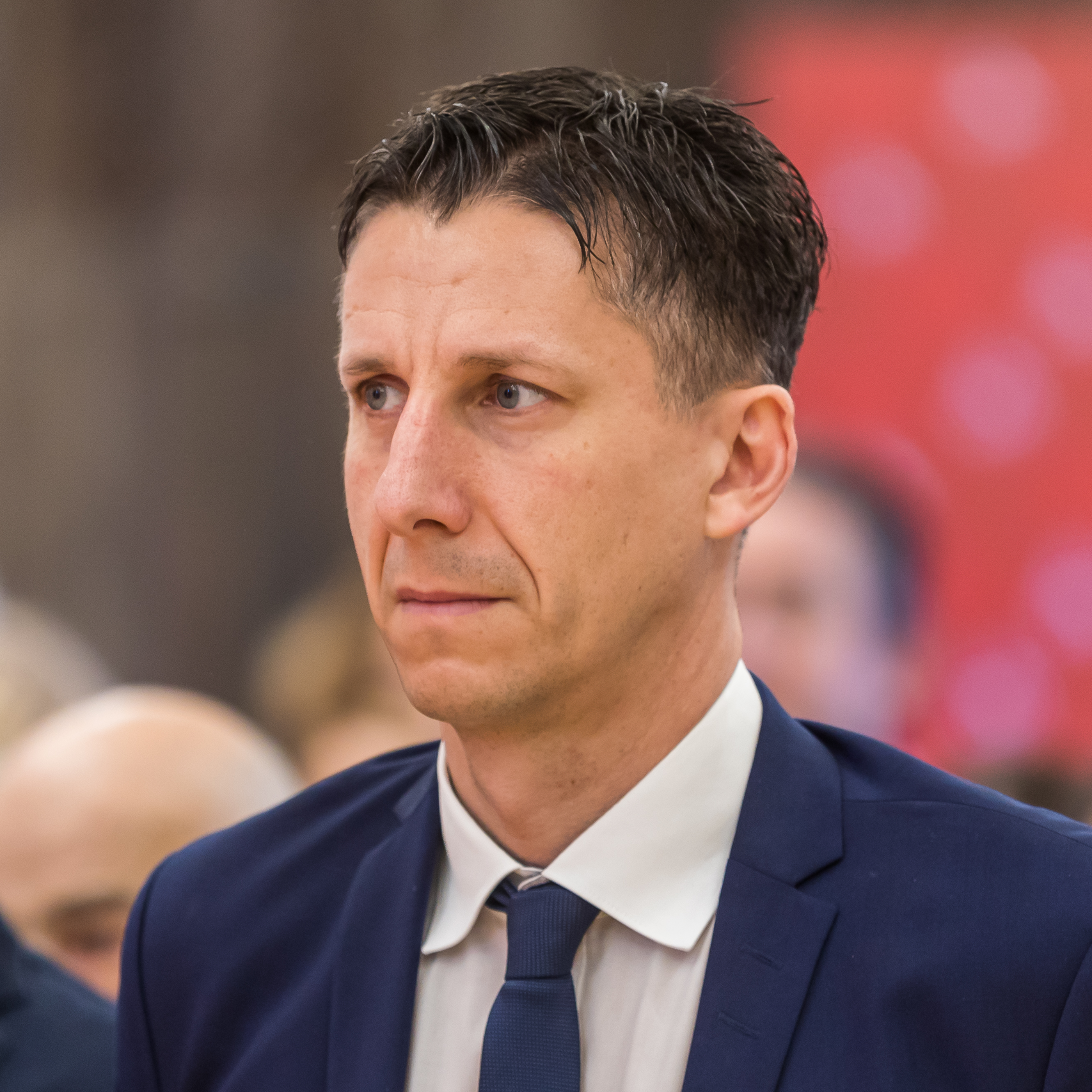
- Keller in 2023
- Born: 26 November 1976 (age 49); Donaueschingen, Baden-Württemberg, West Germany
- Education: Reutlingen University; University of Tübingen
- Occupation: Sports administrator
- Employers: SRH University Heidelberg; SSV Jahn Regensburg; 1. FC Köln
- Board member of: Deutsche Fußball Liga

Christian Keller (born 26 November 1976) is a German academic and sports administrator who currently serves as the managing director at 1. FC Köln. He earned a doctorate from the University of Tübingen, and subsequently taught sport management at SRH University Heidelberg while also advising professional football clubs. From 2013 to 2021, he worked as the managing director of SSV Jahn Regensburg. In March 2023, he was elected to the governing board of Deutsche Fußball Liga, the organising body of Germany's professional football leagues.

== Early life and academic career ==
Christian Keller was born on 26 November 1976 in Donaueschingen in the German state of Baden-Württemberg. He studied international trade at Reutlingen University, graduating with a dissertation about publicly listed football clubs. In 2008, after obtaining a degree in business development from the same institution, he acquired a doctoral degree from the University of Tübingen on financial management of football clubs under the supervision of the sports scientist Helmut Digel. He then taught sport management at SRH University Heidelberg.

== Management career ==
In parallel to his academic career, Keller began working as a consultant to professional football clubs. In 2013, he was appointed managing director at SSV Jahn Regensburg. During his tenure, the club achieved promotion from the fourth-tier Regionalliga Bayern to the fully-professional 3. Liga, and later to 2. Bundesliga, the second tier of the German football league system. He stepped down from his role at Regensburg in October 2021. The club had been facing insolvency at the time of Keller's appointment but was debt-free when he departed. On 1 April 2022, he was appointed managing director at Bundesliga club 1. FC Köln, a position that had been vacant since the dismissal of Horst Heldt in May of the previous year.

In March 2023, Keller was nominated by a group of clubs including Köln and FC Augsburg to succeed Fredi Bobic on the governing board of Deutsche Fußball Liga (DFL), the organising body of Germany's professional football leagues. Standing against Werder Bremen's Klaus Filbry, he was elected with 18 votes to 16. While Filbry was supported by two thirds of Bundesliga clubs, Keller won thanks to the votes of most 2. Bundesliga teams. Before the election, Keller had voiced scepticism about a potential sale of DFL media rights to an investor.

== Bibliography ==
- Ebert, Michael (3 March 2023). "Die Wahl von Keller besitzt Spaltpotenzial". kicker (in German).
- Carspecken, Tobias (5 April 2022). "Die Kölner Wunschlösung legt los". Kölnische Rundschau (in German).
- "Christian Keller kommt zum FC". 1. FC Köln (in German). 23 November 2021.
- Otto, Gerd; Otto, Wolfgang (2014). Servus, Jahnstadion! Eine Regensburger Institution nimmt Abschied' (in German). Regensburg: Forum Verlag. ISBN 978-3-9816128-2-0.
- "Trotz Traumnoten stets bescheiden". Südkurier (in German). 18 October 2008.
- "Christian Keller ist schon Professor". Südkurier (in German). 25 August 2010.
