= Norman Crider =

Norman Crider (August 29, 1938, in Lordsburg, New Mexico – August 19, 2009, in Indianapolis) was a baton-twirling champion and proprietor of the Ballet Shop near Lincoln Center in New York. He also owned a gallery-bookshop on Madison Avenue where in 1977 he held an acclaimed exhibition on prima ballerina Anna Pavlova.

In 1957 Crider performed with batons in an ice show at the Conrad Hilton Hotel in Chicago, at which time he began to study ballet. Two years later he developed a nightclub act combining ballet and baton-twirling which he took to Europe. He taught twirling to French and Italian schoolchildren for the next eight years and was awarded the Order of Cultural Merit and Philanthropy by the French government.

Besides the Ballet Shop, Crider founded the Antiques Center of America, on the East Side of Manhattan, and owned shops in the Trump Tower and La Boutique Fantasque at Rockefeller Center. After the Ballet Shop closed in 1996, he opened a shop in Winter Park, Florida, which was located next to The Morse Museum of American Art, before moving to Indianapolis.

== Obituaries ==
- NY Times by Anna Kisselgoff, September 10, 2009
- Ballet Talk
- El Defensor Chieftain
  - part one by Valerie Kimble, September 16th, 2009
  - part two, September 16th, 2009

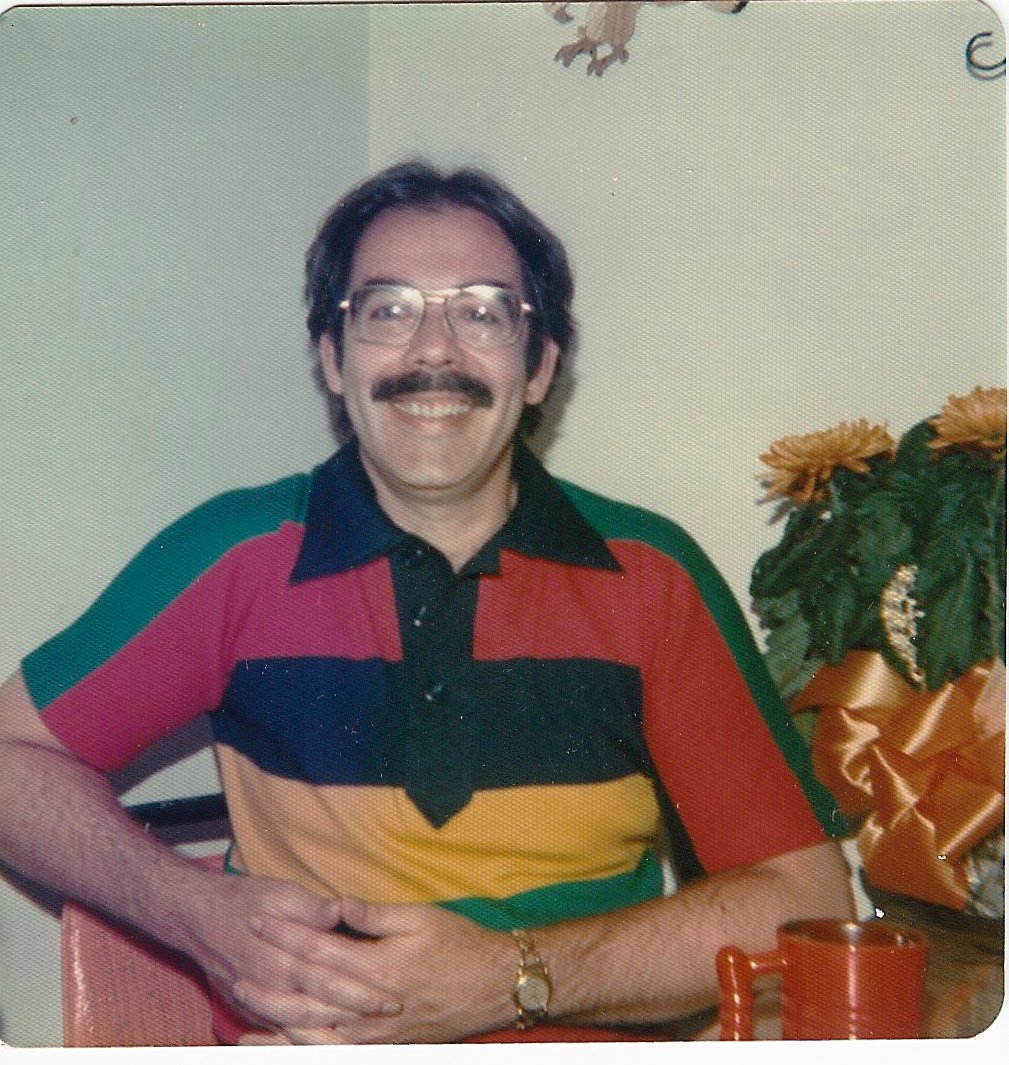
Norman Crider in 1977

Norman Crider

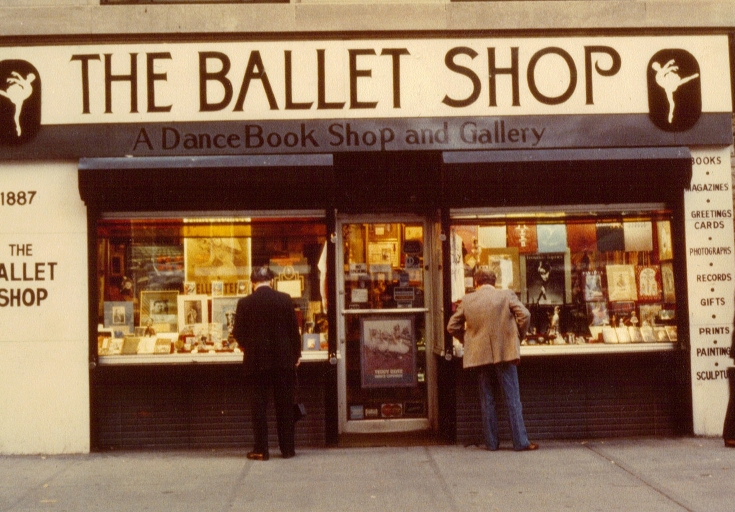
balletshop
