= SRH University Heidelberg =

Private university in Heidelberg, Germany

SRH Heidelberg
- SRH Hochschule Heidelberg
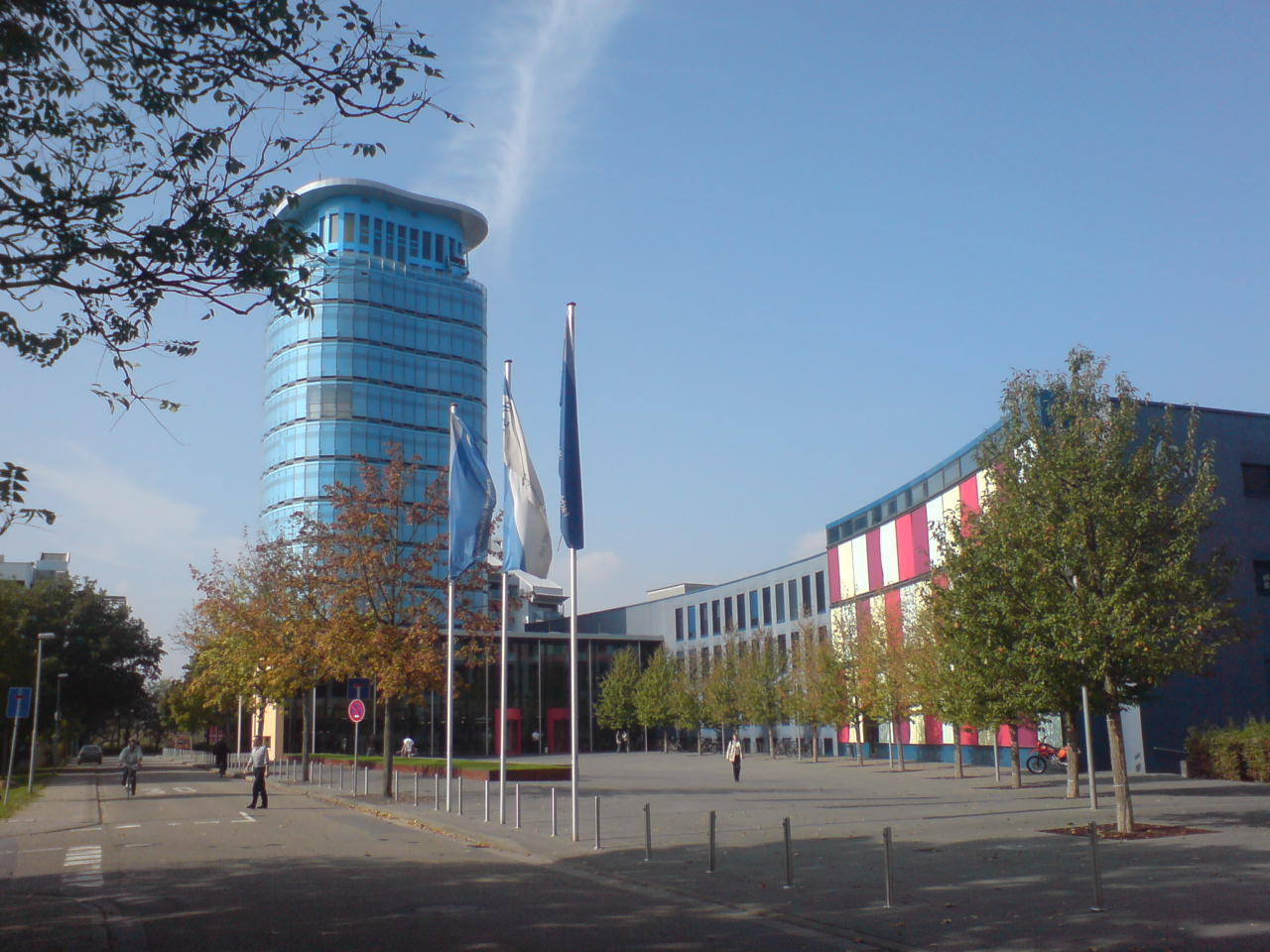
- Former name: Stiftung Rehabilitation Heidelberg
- Type: Private
- Established: 1969
- Students: 3,600
- Location: Heidelberg, Baden-Württemberg, Germany; 49.413°N 8.654°E
- Website: www.hochschule-heidelberg.de/en

The SRH University of Applied Sciences Heidelberg is a state-recognized private university in Heidelberg, Germany.

It was established in its current form in 2024 through the merger of five previously independent SRH universities within the SRH group. The university offers bachelor’s, master’s and MBA programmes in fields including business, engineering, health sciences, psychology, social sciences and design.

SRH University operates across 18 campuses in Germany, with its main administrative seat in Heidelberg.

== History ==
SRH University Heidelberg was established on October 1, 1969, originally functioning as an institution dedicated to the professional rehabilitation of individuals with disabilities within the higher education sector. In 1991, the university expanded its admissions to include private students, leading to a diversification of its academic programs and student body.

In 2004, the institution received accreditation from the German Science Council (Wissenschaftsrat). The same year marked the relocation of the university to the newly constructed Science Tower on its Heidelberg campus. In 2007, the university was renamed SRH Hochschule Heidelberg, reflecting its integration into the SRH Holding network. A subsequent re-accreditation by the Science Council occurred in 2009.

The university introduced the CORE (Competence Oriented Research and Education) study model in 2012, emphasizing competence-based learning. By 2012, the student population exceeded 3,000. In 2017, SRH University Heidelberg incorporated the SRH Hochschule für Wirtschaft und Medien Calw as a satellite campus, which remained operational until its closure in 2021.

As of 2026, SRH University enrolled approximately 9,500 students.

== Study ==
SRH University Heidelberg offers undergraduate and graduate degree programs in a range of academic fields and taught in both German and English. The programs are structured to combine academic instruction with applied components.

=== Undergraduate Programs ===
Bachelor's degree programs are offered in the following subject areas:

- Computer Science
- Business Administration
- Engineering
- Architecture
- Social Work
- Psychology
- Therapy Sciences

The standard duration of bachelor's programs is six to seven semesters, including the completion of a thesis project.

=== Graduate Programs ===
Master's degree programs are available in disciplines including:

- Applied Computer Science
- Big Data and Business Analytics
- International Business and Engineering
- Music Therapy
- Dance Movement Therapy
- International Management and Leadership

Master's programs typically require three to four semesters of study and conclude with a master's thesis.

=== Study Model ===
SRH University Heidelberg implements the CORE (Competence Oriented Research and Education) model. This approach emphasizes competency-based learning and includes regular assessment intervals, practical application, and individualized study planning.

== Research ==
SRH University Heidelberg conducts applied research across several disciplines, including health sciences, social sciences, engineering, and business. Research activities are organized within individual faculties and research groups and are integrated with the university's academic programs.

The university supports research projects with an emphasis on practical application and interdisciplinary collaboration. External cooperation with industry and public institutions is part of the research profile. Doctoral research is supported through the university's Graduate Centre, which provides organizational and academic assistance to doctoral candidates.
