= Crider (soil) =

Profile of Crider soil
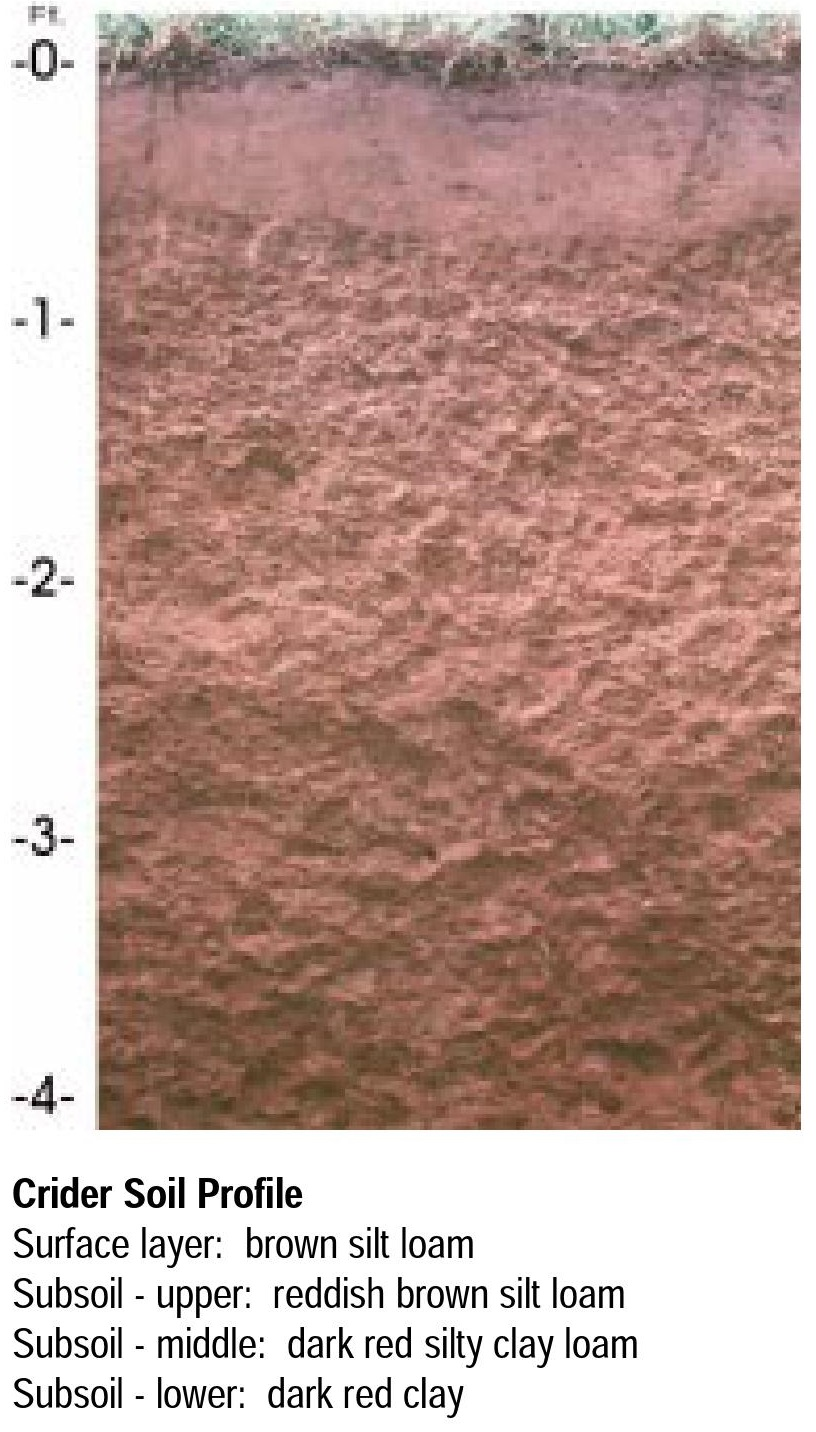

Crider is a soil series and the state soil of Kentucky.

== Description ==
The Natural Resources Conservation Service describes Crider as a soil series with "very deep, well drained, moderately permeable soils on uplands. They formed in a mantle of loess and the underlying limestone residuum." It is known to be present in Kentucky, Indiana, Illinois, Missouri, Ohio, and Tennessee. The soil is considered a highly productive agricultural soil, such that much of Kentucky's land with Crider soil is used for farming.

== State soil ==
In 1990, Crider was named the state soil of Kentucky. It is present in 35 counties in the state, most extensively in the Pennyroyal Plateau.

== See also ==
- List of U.S. state soils
- List of Kentucky state symbols
