= New Woollam, Missouri =

Unincorporated community in Missouri, United States

Coordinates: 38°22′37″N 91°34′23″W

New Woollam is an unincorporated community in Gasconade County, in the U.S. state of Missouri.

== History ==
A community called Woollam has existed at two nearby locations, hence the names New Woollam and Old Woollam. A post office called Woollam was established in 1853, and remained in operation until 1932. The community most likely was named after a local merchant.
