= Rosebud, Missouri =

- City
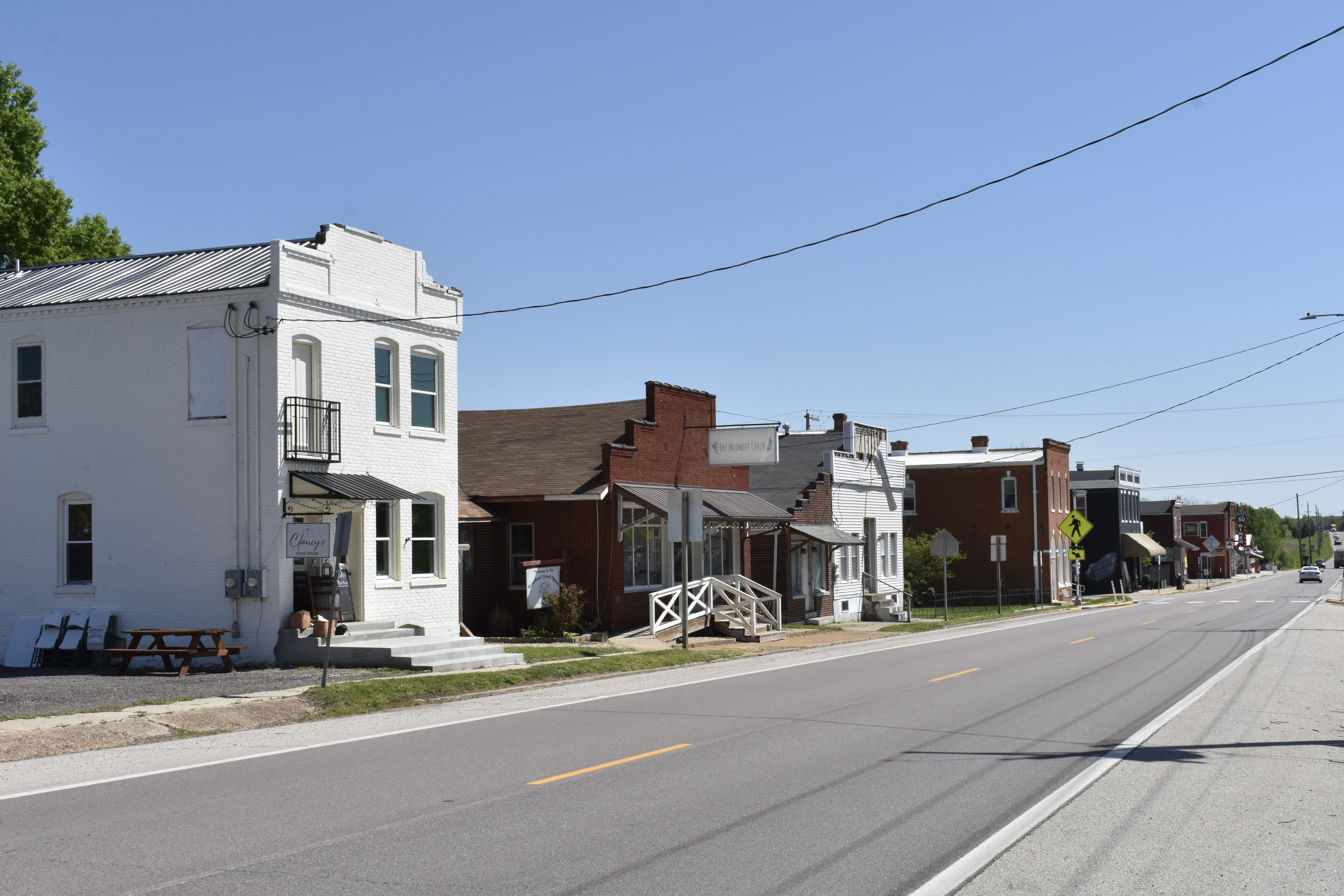
- Rosebud as seen from U.S. Route 50

- Location of Rosebud, Missouri
- Coordinates: 38°23′06″N 91°24′09″W
- Country: United States
- State: Missouri
- County: Gasconade

Government
  - Type: Mayor / Council
  - Mayor: Shannon Grus

Area
  - Total: 0.87 sq mi (2.26 km^{2})
  - Land: 0.87 sq mi (2.26 km^{2})
  - Water: 0.0039 sq mi (0.01 km^{2})
- Elevation: 869 ft (265 m)

Population (2020)
  - Total: 390
  - Density: 447.9/sq mi (172.94/km^{2})
- Time zone: UTC-6 (Central (CST))
  - Summer (DST): UTC-5 (CDT)
- ZIP code: 63091
- Area code: 573
- FIPS code: 29-63110
- GNIS feature ID: 2396431

Rosebud is a city in Gasconade County, Missouri, United States. The population was 390 at the 2020 census.

== Geography ==
According to the United States Census Bureau, the city has a total area of 0.87 square miles (2.25 km^{2}), all land.

=== Climate ===
According to the Köppen Climate Classification system, Rosebud has a humid subtropical climate, abbreviated "Cfa" on climate maps. The hottest temperature recorded in Rosebud was 107 °F (41.7 °C) on August 30, 1984, while the coldest temperature recorded was −26 °F (−32.2 °C) on January 7, 2014.

Climate data for Rosebud, Missouri, 1991–2020 normals, extremes 1980–present
Month	Jan	Feb	Mar	Apr	May	Jun	Jul	Aug	Sep	Oct	Nov	Dec	Year
Record high °F (°C)	74 (23)	82 (28)	91 (33)	94 (34)	96 (36)	106 (41)	105 (41)	107 (42)	101 (38)	94 (34)	84 (29)	77 (25)	107 (42)
Mean maximum °F (°C)	65.2 (18.4)	70.5 (21.4)	78.0 (25.6)	84.3 (29.1)	87.0 (30.6)	91.7 (33.2)	96.5 (35.8)	96.9 (36.1)	91.5 (33.1)	85.1 (29.5)	76.0 (24.4)	66.5 (19.2)	96.9 (36.1)
Mean daily maximum °F (°C)	39.8 (4.3)	45.0 (7.2)	55.0 (12.8)	66.3 (19.1)	74.6 (23.7)	82.8 (28.2)	87.4 (30.8)	86.6 (30.3)	79.3 (26.3)	68.1 (20.1)	55.0 (12.8)	43.9 (6.6)	65.3 (18.5)
Daily mean °F (°C)	28.9 (−1.7)	33.0 (0.6)	42.4 (5.8)	52.9 (11.6)	62.4 (16.9)	71.1 (21.7)	75.5 (24.2)	73.9 (23.3)	65.8 (18.8)	54.5 (12.5)	42.7 (5.9)	33.1 (0.6)	53.0 (11.7)
Mean daily minimum °F (°C)	18.0 (−7.8)	21.1 (−6.1)	29.9 (−1.2)	39.6 (4.2)	50.2 (10.1)	59.5 (15.3)	63.5 (17.5)	61.3 (16.3)	52.3 (11.3)	41.0 (5.0)	30.5 (−0.8)	22.3 (−5.4)	40.8 (4.9)
Mean minimum °F (°C)	−2.2 (−19.0)	3.1 (−16.1)	11.8 (−11.2)	25.8 (−3.4)	34.6 (1.4)	47.6 (8.7)	53.9 (12.2)	51.0 (10.6)	37.3 (2.9)	25.9 (−3.4)	15.8 (−9.0)	4.8 (−15.1)	−5.4 (−20.8)
Record low °F (°C)	−26 (−32)	−16 (−27)	−4 (−20)	17 (−8)	20 (−7)	40 (4)	48 (9)	36 (2)	27 (−3)	17 (−8)	1 (−17)	−23 (−31)	−26 (−32)
Average precipitation inches (mm)	2.69 (68)	2.40 (61)	3.67 (93)	4.84 (123)	5.58 (142)	4.48 (114)	3.94 (100)	3.94 (100)	4.01 (102)	3.37 (86)	3.58 (91)	2.69 (68)	45.19 (1,148)
Average snowfall inches (cm)	4.2 (11)	3.5 (8.9)	1.7 (4.3)	0.0 (0.0)	0.0 (0.0)	0.0 (0.0)	0.0 (0.0)	0.0 (0.0)	0.0 (0.0)	0.0 (0.0)	1.5 (3.8)	3.3 (8.4)	14.2 (36.4)
Average extreme snow depth inches (cm)	3.8 (9.7)	2.8 (7.1)	2.5 (6.4)	0.0 (0.0)	0.0 (0.0)	0.0 (0.0)	0.0 (0.0)	0.0 (0.0)	0.0 (0.0)	0.0 (0.0)	0.7 (1.8)	3.6 (9.1)	5.0 (13)
Average precipitation days (≥ 0.01 in)	8.1	8.3	11.2	11.5	12.7	10.7	8.8	8.2	8.0	8.8	8.5	8.8	113.6
Average snowy days (≥ 0.1 in)	3.4	2.6	1.0	0.0	0.0	0.0	0.0	0.0	0.0	0.0	0.8	2.6	10.4
Source 1: NOAA
Source 2: National Weather Service

== Demographics ==
Historical population
Census	Pop.	Note	%±
1930	162		—
1940	193		19.1%
1950	254		31.6%
1960	288		13.4%
1970	305		5.9%
1980	326		6.9%
1990	380		16.6%
2000	364		−4.2%
2010	409		12.4%
2020	390		−4.6%
U.S. Decennial Census

=== 2010 census ===
As of the census of 2010, there were 409 people, 179 households, and 107 families living in the city. The population density was 470.1 inhabitants per square mile (181.5/km^{2}). There were 197 housing units at an average density of 226.4 per square mile (87.4/km^{2}). The racial makeup of the city was 97.1% White, 0.2% Native American, 1.0% Asian, 0.2% Pacific Islander, 0.5% from other races, and 1.0% from two or more races. Hispanic or Latino of any race were 1.7% of the population.

There were 179 households 26.8% had children under the age of 18 living with them, 47.5% were married couples living together, 10.1% had a female householder with no husband present, 2.2% had a male householder with no wife present, and 40.2% were non-families. 34.1% of all households were made up of individuals, and 15.1% had someone living alone who was 65 years of age or older. The average household size was 2.28 and the average family size was 2.88.

The median age in the city was 43.2 years. 22.7% of residents were under the age of 18; 5.9% were between the ages of 18 and 24; 24.7% were from 25 to 44; 27.4% were from 45 to 64; and 19.3% were 65 years of age or older. The gender makeup of the city was 47.4% male and 52.6% female.

=== 2000 census ===
As of the census of 2000, there were 364 people, 155 households, and 103 families living in the city. The population density was 1,119.4 inhabitants per square mile (432.2/km^{2}). There were 165 housing units at an average density of 507.4 per square mile (195.9/km^{2}). The racial makeup of the city was 97.53% White, 0.27% African American, and 2.20% from two or more races.

There were 155 households, out of which 31.6% had children under the age of 18 living with them, 55.5% were married couples living together, 8.4% had a female householder with no husband present, and 33.5% were non-families. 32.3% of all households were made up of individuals, and 17.4% had someone living alone who was 65 years of age or older. The average household size was 2.35 and the average family size was 2.88.

In the city the population was spread out, with 25.8% under the age of 18, 9.6% from 18 to 24, 27.7% from 25 to 44, 17.9% from 45 to 64, and 19.0% who were 65 years of age or older. The median age was 36 years. For every 100 females, there were 91.6 males. For every 100 females age 18 and over, there were 90.1 males.

The median income for a household in the city was $29,688, and the median income for a family was $33,750. Males had a median income of $24,766 versus $17,857 for females. The per capita income for the city was $18,513. About 13.5% of families and 23.3% of the population were below the poverty line, including 30.2% of those under age 18 and 16.4% of those age 65 or over.

== Education ==
It is in the Gasconade County R-II School District.
