= Owensville, Missouri =

- City
- City of Owensville
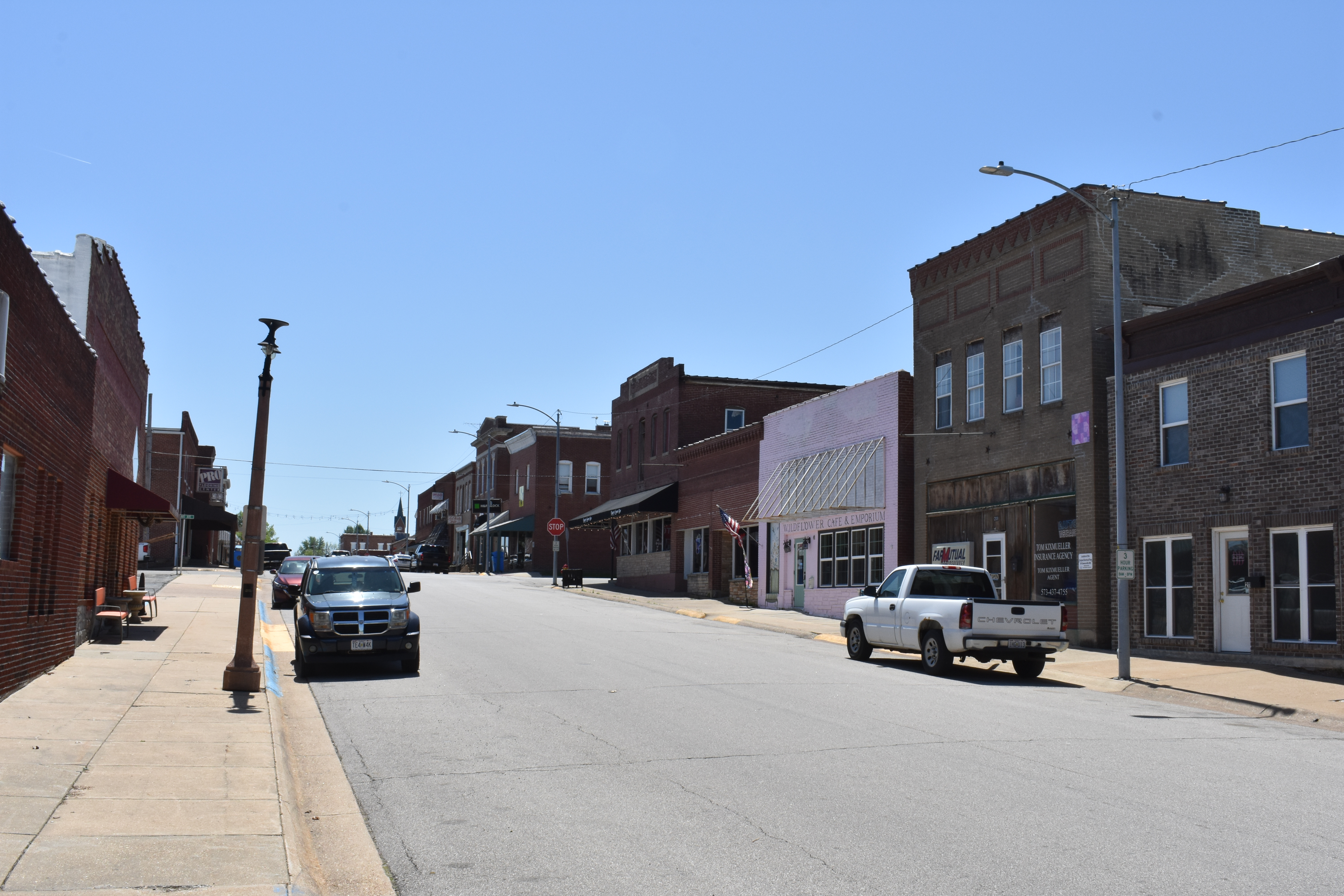
- Owensville as seen on First Street

- Location of Owensville, Missouri
- Coordinates: 38°20′48″N 91°30′0″W
- Country: United States
- State: Missouri
- County: Gasconade

Government
  - Mayor: Kevin McFadden
  - City Administrator: Randy Blaske
  - City Clerk: Peggy Farrell
  - Deputy City Clerk: Kara Meyer
  - City Collector: Rhonda Cruse

Area
  - Total: 2.60 sq mi (6.73 km^{2})
  - Land: 2.60 sq mi (6.73 km^{2})
  - Water: 0.0039 sq mi (0.01 km^{2})
- Elevation: 925 ft (282 m)

Population (2020)
  - Total: 2,757
  - Estimate (2023): 2,758
  - Density: 1,061.7/sq mi (409.93/km^{2})
- Time zone: UTC-6 (Central (CST))
  - Summer (DST): UTC-5 (CDT)
- ZIP code: 65066
- Area code: 573
- FIPS code: 29-55640
- GNIS feature ID: 2396115
- Website: www.cityofowensville.com

Owensville is a city in Gasconade County, Missouri, United States. The population was 2,757 at the 2020 census.

== History ==
Owensville was named after late merchant Frank Owens. According to local legend Owens and blacksmith Edward Luster decided on the name while playing horseshoes in 1846. According to one account Luster won the contest but thought Owensville sounded better than Lusterville. Another account said Owens won the contest. The first post office was in 1856 and the town was formally platted in 1886 with the arrival of the Chicago, Rock Island and Pacific Railroad.

== Geography ==
According to the United States Census Bureau, the city has a total area of 2.64 square miles (6.84 km^{2}), all land.

The city is approximately 70.8 miles (13 km) southwest of St. Louis, 55.5 miles (8.0 km) southeast of Jefferson City and 22.3 miles (4.8 km) north of Cuba.

Missouri Highways 28 and 19 serve Owensville. In addition, the city is 22 miles (35 km) north of Interstate 44.

== Demographics ==
Historical population
| Census | Pop. | Note | %± |
|---|---|---|---|
| 1910 | 677 | | — |
| 1920 | 777 | | 14.8% |
| 1930 | 1,424 | | 83.3% |
| 1940 | 1,439 | | 1.1% |
| 1950 | 1,946 | | 35.2% |
| 1960 | 2,379 | | 22.3% |
| 1970 | 2,416 | | 1.6% |
| 1980 | 2,241 | | −7.2% |
| 1990 | 2,325 | | 3.7% |
| 2000 | 2,500 | | 7.5% |
| 2010 | 2,676 | | 7.0% |
| 2020 | 2,757 | | 3.0% |
U.S. Decennial Census

=== 2020 census ===
As of the 2020 census, Owensville had a population of 2,757. The median age was 40.9 years. 23.7% of residents were under the age of 18 and 23.7% of residents were 65 years of age or older. For every 100 females there were 87.7 males, and for every 100 females age 18 and over there were 81.1 males age 18 and over.

0.0% of residents lived in urban areas, while 100.0% lived in rural areas.

There were 1,110 households in Owensville, of which 30.0% had children under the age of 18 living in them. Of all households, 37.7% were married-couple households, 19.1% were households with a male householder and no spouse or partner present, and 34.7% were households with a female householder and no spouse or partner present. About 36.0% of all households were made up of individuals and 19.8% had someone living alone who was 65 years of age or older.

There were 1,271 housing units, of which 12.7% were vacant. The homeowner vacancy rate was 4.1% and the rental vacancy rate was 7.9%.

Racial composition as of the 2020 census
| Race | Number | Percent |
|---|---|---|
| White | 2,527 | 91.7% |
| Black or African American | 7 | 0.3% |
| American Indian and Alaska Native | 9 | 0.3% |
| Asian | 15 | 0.5% |
| Native Hawaiian and Other Pacific Islander | 7 | 0.3% |
| Some other race | 15 | 0.5% |
| Two or more races | 177 | 6.4% |
| Hispanic or Latino (of any race) | 52 | 1.9% |

=== 2010 census ===
As of the census of 2010, there were 2,676 people, 1,081 households, and 680 families living in the city. The population density was 1,013.6 inhabitants per square mile (391.4/km^{2}). There were 1,280 housing units at an average density of 484.8 per square mile (187.2/km^{2}). The racial makeup of the city was 97.9% White, 0.2% African American, 0.2% Native American, 0.4% Asian, 0.1% from other races, and 1.1% from two or more races. Hispanic or Latino of any race were 1.1% of the population.

There were 1,081 households, of which 31.5% had children under the age of 18 living with them, 44.1% were married couples living together, 14.2% had a female householder with no husband present, 4.6% had a male householder with no wife present, and 37.1% were non-families. 33.0% of all households were made up of individuals, and 16.5% had someone living alone who was 65 years of age or older. The average household size was 2.33 and the average family size was 2.90.

The median age in the city was 41.2 years. 23.1% of residents were under the age of 18; 8.7% were between the ages of 18 and 24; 22.3% were from 25 to 44; 23.2% were from 45 to 64; and 22.6% were 65 years of age or older. The gender makeup of the city was 45.1% male and 54.9% female.

=== 2000 census ===
As of the census of 2000, there were 2,500 people, 1,059 households, and 655 families living in the city. The population density was 1,237.5 inhabitants per square mile (477.8/km^{2}). There were 1,202 housing units at an average density of 595.0 per square mile (229.7/km^{2}). The racial makeup of the city was 98.44% White, 0.08% African American, 0.24% Native American, 0.16% Asian, 0.08% from other races, and 1.00% from two or more races. Hispanic or Latino of any race were 0.36% of the population.

There were 1,059 households, out of which 30.5% had children under the age of 18 living with them, 47.8% were married couples living together, 11.0% had a female householder with no husband present, and 38.1% were non-families. 34.0% of all households were made up of individuals, and 21.1% had someone living alone who was 65 years of age or older. The average household size was 2.30 and the average family size was 2.97.

In the city, the population was spread out, with 25.8% under the age of 18, 7.8% from 18 to 24, 25.7% from 25 to 44, 18.4% from 45 to 64, and 22.3% who were 65 years of age or older. The median age was 39 years. For every 100 females, there were 82.9 males. For every 100 females age 18 and over, there were 79.3 males.

The median income for a household in the city was $26,913, and the median income for a family was $33,109. Males had a median income of $30,162 versus $20,068 for females. The per capita income for the city was $15,208. About 11.0% of families and 15.6% of the population were below the poverty line, including 19.4% of those under age 18 and 13.6% of those age 65 or over.

== Education ==
Public education in Owensville is administered by Gasconade County R-II School District, which operates one elementary school, one middle school, one Owensville High School.

Owensville has a public library, a branch of the Scenic Regional Library system.

== Government ==
Owensville is a fourth-class municipality incorporated under Missouri law. Owensville's government is organized under a Mayor and a four-member City Council. The council is elected from two wards on an alternating basis. The mayor is elected at-large for a two-year term. Other municipal officials include the City Administrator, City Attorney, City Judge, City Collector, City Clerk, City Marshal, and the administrative heads of the City departments.

== Town Life ==
Owensville features a main street filled with many small businesses. The town has two parks, the bigger of the two features a large trail. Slightly out of town lines is the White mule winery which uses locally grown grapes for their wine. When looking for things to do in Owensville, Missouri the Walmart shows up at number 8.

== Friendship city ==
Owensville is a friendship city with:

- Altena, Germany
