= Gasconade County, Missouri =

County in Missouri, United States

- County
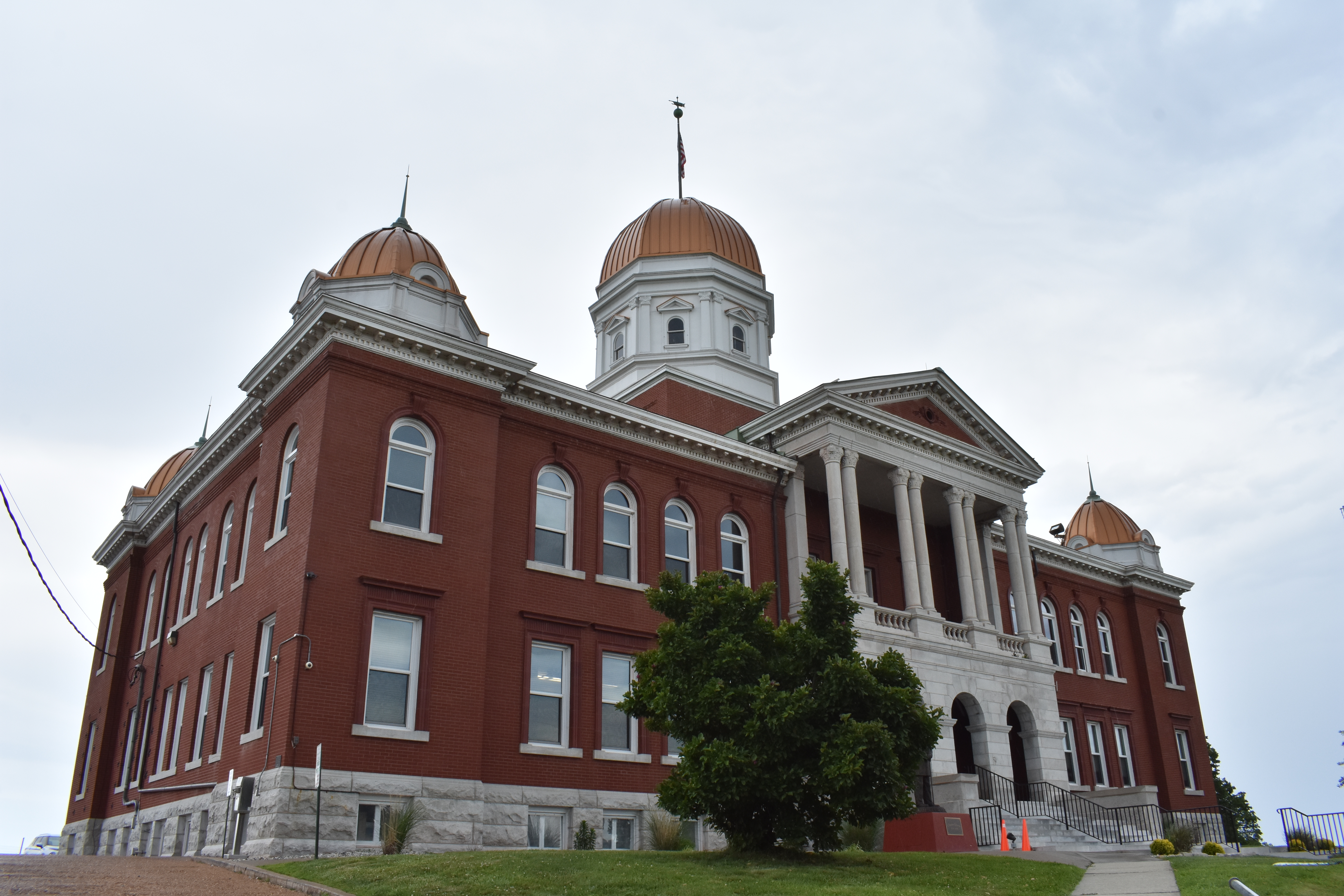
- The Gasconade County Courthouse in Hermann

- Location within the U.S. state of Missouri
- Coordinates: 38°26′N 91°31′W
- Country: United States
- State: Missouri
- Founded: November 25, 1820
- Named for: Gasconade River
- Seat: Hermann
- Largest city: Owensville

Area
  - Total: 524 sq mi (1,360 km^{2})
  - Land: 518 sq mi (1,340 km^{2})
  - Water: 6.6 sq mi (17 km^{2}) 1.3%

Population (2020)
  - Total: 14,794
  - Estimate (2025): 14,784 ▼
  - Density: 28.6/sq mi (11.0/km^{2})
- Time zone: UTC−6 (Central)
  - Summer (DST): UTC−5 (CDT)
- Area code: 573
- Congressional district: 3rd
- Website: gasconadecounty.org

Gasconade County is a county located in the east-central portion of the U.S. state of Missouri. As of the 2020 census, the population was 14,794. The county was organized on 25 November 1820 and the county seat has been Hermann since 1842. The county was named after the Gasconade River.

The county is located on the south side of the Missouri River, which once served as the chief route of transportation in the state. It is located in the area known as the Missouri Rhineland. Because of its distinctive conditions, the Hermann area was designated an American Viticultural Area (AVA) in 1983. The southern part of the county is within the larger Ozark Highlands AVA, established in 1987.

== Etymology ==
Gasconade County (and the Gasconade River) received its name from French-speaking settlers. They came from the Gascony region in southwestern France during French colonial rule of New France (Louisiana Territory).

Per a 1916 Missouri Historical Review article, "The name is from 'Gascon', an inhabitant of Gascony,' a unique, marginal maritime province in the southwest of France with Basque cultural roots.

== Geography ==
According to the U.S. Census Bureau the county has a total area of 524 square miles (1,360 km^{2}), of which 6.6 square miles (17 km^{2}) (1.3%) is covered by water.

=== Adjacent counties ===
- Montgomery County (north)
- Warren County (northeast)
- Franklin County (east)
- Crawford County (southeast)
- Phelps County (south)
- Maries County (southwest)
- Osage County (west)
- Callaway County (northwest)

=== Major highways ===
- US 50
- Route 19
- Route 28
- Route 100

== Demographics ==
Historical population
Census	Pop.	Note	%±
1830	1,545		—
1840	5,330		245.0%
1850	4,996		−6.3%
1860	8,727		74.7%
1870	10,093		15.7%
1880	11,153		10.5%
1890	11,706		5.0%
1900	12,298		5.1%
1910	12,847		4.5%
1920	12,381		−3.6%
1930	12,172		−1.7%
1940	12,414		2.0%
1950	12,342		−0.6%
1960	12,195		−1.2%
1970	11,878		−2.6%
1980	13,181		11.0%
1990	14,006		6.3%
2000	15,342		9.5%
2010	15,222		−0.8%
2020	14,794		−2.8%
2025 (est.)	14,784	▼	−0.1%
U.S. Decennial Census; 1790-1960 1900-1990; 1990-2000 2010-2015

=== 2020 census ===
As of the 2020 census, the county had a population of 14,794. The median age was 46.7 years, 21.0% of residents were under the age of 18, and 23.6% of residents were 65 years of age or older. For every 100 females there were 101.1 males, and for every 100 females age 18 and over there were 97.3 males. About 0.0% of residents lived in urban areas, while 100.0% lived in rural areas.

The racial makeup of the county was 93.0% White, 0.2% Black or African American, 0.3% American Indian and Alaska Native, 0.3% Asian, 0.1% Native Hawaiian and Pacific Islander, 0.4% from some other race, and 5.8% from two or more races. Hispanic or Latino residents of any race comprised 1.3% of the population.

There were 6,111 households in the county, of which 26.7% had children under the age of 18 living with them and 22.5% had a female householder with no spouse or partner present. About 29.6% of all households were made up of individuals and 16.0% had someone living alone who was 65 years of age or older. There were 7,577 housing units, of which 19.3% were vacant. Among occupied housing units, 77.5% were owner-occupied and 22.5% were renter-occupied. The homeowner vacancy rate was 2.2% and the rental vacancy rate was 8.8%.

Gasconade County, Missouri – Racial and ethnic composition Note: the US Census treats Hispanic/Latino as an ethnic category. This table excludes Latinos from the racial categories and assigns them to a separate category. Hispanics/Latinos may be of any race.
Race / Ethnicity (NH = Non-Hispanic)	Pop 1980	Pop 1990	Pop 2000	Pop 2010	Pop 2020	% 1980	% 1990	% 2000	% 2010	% 2020
White alone (NH)	13,079	13,924	15,101	14,801	13,705	99.23%	99.41%	98.43%	97.23%	92.64%
Black or African American alone (NH)	6	10	17	26	18	0.05%	0.07%	0.11%	0.17%	0.12%
Native American or Alaska Native alone (NH)	9	20	27	26	25	0.07%	0.14%	0.18%	0.17%	0.17%
Asian alone (NH)	24	17	24	53	51	0.18%	0.12%	0.16%	0.35%	0.34%
Native Hawaiian or Pacific Islander alone (NH)	x	x	1	6	9	x	x	0.01%	0.04%	0.06%
Other race alone (NH)	16	0	3	6	24	0.12%	0.00%	0.02%	0.04%	0.16%
Mixed race or Multiracial (NH)	x	x	105	152	773	x	x	0.68%	1.00%	5.23%
Hispanic or Latino (any race)	47	35	64	152	189	0.36%	0.25%	0.42%	1.00%	1.28%
Total	13,181	14,006	15,342	15,222	14,794	100.00%	100.00%	100.00%	100.00%	100.00%

=== 2000 census ===
As of the census of 2000, 15,342 people, 6,171 households, and 4,288 families resided in the county. The population density was 30 people per square mile (12 people/km^{2}). The 7,813 housing units had an average density of 15 units per square mile (5.8/km^{2}). The racial makeup of the county was 98.69% White, 0.12% African American, 0.18% Native American, 0.16% Asian, 0.15% from other races, and 0.70% from two or more races. About 0.42% of the population were Hispanic or Latino of any race.

Of the 6,171 households, 31.0% had children under 18 living with them, 58.0% were married couples living together, 7.6% had a female householder with no husband present, and 30.5% were not families. About 27.0% of all households were made up of individuals, and 14.6% had someone living alone who was 65 or older. The average household size was 2.44, and the average family size was 2.95.

In the county, the age distribution was 24.8% under 18, 6.9% from 18 to 24, 25.9% from 25 to 44, 23.7% from 45 to 64, and 18.8% who were 65 or older. The median age was 40 years. For every 100 females, there were 94.60 males. For every 100 females 18 and over, there were 92.9 males.

The median income for a household in the county was $35,047, and for a family was $41,518. Males had a median income of $29,659 versus $20,728 for females. The per capita income for the county was $17,319. About 7.00% of families and 9.50% of the population were below the poverty line, including 11.20% of those under age 18 and 10.00% of those 65 or over.

== Politics ==
=== Local ===
The Republican Party in Gasconade County holds all of the elected positions.

Gasconade County, Missouri

Elected countywide officials
Assessor	Paul Schulte	Republican
Circuit Clerk	Pamela R. Greunke	Republican
County Clerk	Lesa Lietzow	Republican
Collector	Shawn Schlottach	Republican
Commissioner (presiding)	Tim Schulte	Republican
Commissioner (district 1)	James Holland	Republican
Commissioner (district 2)	Jerry D. Lairmore	Republican
Coroner	Jeffrey Arnold	Republican
Prosecuting Attorney	Mary Weston	Republican
Public Administrator	Kelly Brehe-Thomas	Republican
Recorder	Pamela R. Greunke	Republican
Sheriff	Scott Eiler	Republican
Surveyor	Vincent Klott	Republican
Treasurer	Michael C. Feagan	Republican

=== State ===
Past Gubernatorial Elections Results
Year	Republican	Democratic	Third Parties
2024	80.38% 6,354	17.87% 1,413	1.74% 138
2020	78.68% 6,192	19.53% 1,537	1.79% 141
2016	63.04% 4,681	32.35% 2,402	4.61% 342
2012	53.18% 3,775	44.55% 3,162	2.27% 161
2008	55.78% 4,307	42.90% 3,313	1.32% 102
2004	65.36% 4,696	33.57% 2,412	1.07% 77
2000	61.83% 4,091	35.31% 2,336	2.86% 189
1996	50.99% 3,042	46.36% 2,766	2.65% 158

Gasconade County is entirely contained within district 61 in the Missouri House of Representatives.

- District 61 — Bruce Sassmann (R-Bland). Consists of the counties of Gasconade, Montgomery, and Osage.

Missouri House of Representatives — District 61 — Gasconade County (2016)
Party	Candidate	Votes	%	±%
Republican	Justin Alferman	2,531	80.20%	+4.86
Democratic	Tom Smith	625	19.80%	−4.86

Missouri House of Representatives — District 61 — Gasconade County (2014)
Party	Candidate	Votes	%	±%
Republican	Justin Alferman	1,341	75.34%	+6.58
Democratic	Tom Smith	439	24.66%	−6.58

=== State Senate ===
Gasconade County is a part of Missouri's 6th District in the Missouri Senate and is currently represented by Mike Bernskoetter (R-Jefferson City).

Missouri Senate — District 6 — Gasconade County (2014)
Party	Candidate	Votes	%	±%
Republican	Mike Kehoe	3,105	78.49%	
Democratic	Mollie Freebairn	851	21.51%	

=== Federal ===
U.S. Senate — Missouri — Gasconade County (2016)
Party	Candidate	Votes	%	±%
Republican	Roy Blunt	4,743	63.92%	+12.62
Democratic	Jason Kander	2,319	31.25%	−10.43
Libertarian	Jonathan Dine	176	2.37%	−4.65
Green	Johnathan McFarland	90	1.21%	+1.21
Constitution	Fred Ryman	92	1.24%	+1.24

U.S. Senate — Missouri — Gasconade County (2012)
Party	Candidate	Votes	%	±%
Republican	Todd Akin	3,603	51.30%	
Democratic	Claire McCaskill	2,927	41.68%	
Libertarian	Jonathan Dine	493	7.02%	

Gasconade County is included in Missouri's 3rd Congressional District and is represented by Blaine Luetkemeyer (R-St. Elizabeth) in the U.S. House of Representatives.

U.S. House of Representatives — Missouri's 3rd Congressional District — Gasconade County (2016)
Party	Candidate	Votes	%	±%
Republican	Blaine Luetkemeyer	5,770	78.61%	+1.36
Democratic	Kevin Miller	1,344	18.31%	−1.31
Libertarian	Dan Hogan	155	2.11%	−1.02
Constitution	Doanita Simmons	71	0.97%	+0.97

U.S. House of Representatives — Missouri's 3rd Congressional District — Gasconade County (2014)
Party	Candidate	Votes	%	±%
Republican	Blaine Luetkemeyer	3,083	77.25%	+1.83
Democratic	Courtney Denton	783	19.62%	−2.81
Libertarian	Steven Hedrick	125	3.13%	+0.98

U.S. House of Representatives — Missouri's 3rd Congressional District — Gasconade County (2012)
Party	Candidate	Votes	%	±%
Republican	Blaine Luetkemeyer	5,272	75.42%	
Democratic	Eric Mayer	1,568	22.43%	
Libertarian	Steven Wilson	150	2.15%	

==== Political culture ====
United States presidential election results for Gasconade County, Missouri
Year	Republican		Democratic		Third party(ies)	
Year	No.	%	No.	%	No.	%
1888	1,735	75.14%	556	24.08%	18	0.78%
1892	1,625	72.74%	602	26.95%	7	0.31%
1896	2,185	80.10%	515	18.88%	28	1.03%
1900	2,015	76.91%	575	21.95%	30	1.15%
1904	2,045	80.20%	469	18.39%	36	1.41%
1908	2,220	80.35%	509	18.42%	34	1.23%
1912	1,539	58.94%	518	19.84%	554	21.22%
1916	2,513	82.20%	510	16.68%	34	1.11%
1920	4,481	90.02%	454	9.12%	43	0.86%
1924	3,306	75.88%	577	13.24%	474	10.88%
1928	4,171	79.57%	1,058	20.18%	13	0.25%
1932	2,571	55.77%	1,998	43.34%	41	0.89%
1936	4,202	73.51%	1,492	26.10%	22	0.38%
1940	5,333	82.03%	1,163	17.89%	5	0.08%
1944	5,007	83.27%	994	16.53%	12	0.20%
1948	4,268	77.81%	1,204	21.95%	13	0.24%
1952	5,339	80.49%	1,285	19.37%	9	0.14%
1956	5,080	78.97%	1,353	21.03%	0	0.00%
1960	4,854	74.62%	1,651	25.38%	0	0.00%
1964	3,672	63.33%	2,126	36.67%	0	0.00%
1968	4,400	74.64%	1,131	19.19%	364	6.17%
1972	4,944	80.13%	1,226	19.87%	0	0.00%
1976	3,925	69.08%	1,702	29.95%	55	0.97%
1980	4,481	72.24%	1,550	24.99%	172	2.77%
1984	4,678	80.54%	1,130	19.46%	0	0.00%
1988	4,216	72.01%	1,621	27.69%	18	0.31%
1992	2,690	42.47%	1,952	30.82%	1,692	26.71%
1996	2,997	50.19%	2,104	35.24%	870	14.57%
2000	4,190	63.21%	2,257	34.05%	182	2.75%
2004	4,753	66.28%	2,355	32.84%	63	0.88%
2008	4,763	61.29%	2,899	37.31%	109	1.40%
2012	4,895	68.62%	2,099	29.42%	140	1.96%
2016	5,670	76.10%	1,520	20.40%	261	3.50%
2020	6,222	78.53%	1,601	20.21%	100	1.26%
2024	6,370	79.65%	1,555	19.44%	72	0.90%

At the presidential level, Gasconade County is one of the most reliably Republican strongholds in Missouri. The Republican presidential nominee has won Gasconade County in every presidential election since Abraham Lincoln was first elected in 1860, giving the county the longest active Republican voting streak for presidential elections in the United States. In fact, no Democrat has even managed to break 40% of the vote in the county since Franklin D. Roosevelt in 1932.

Like most rural areas throughout Northeast Missouri, voters in Gasconade County generally adhere to socially and culturally conservative principles, which tend to influence their Republican leanings. In 2004, Missourians voted on a constitutional amendment to define marriage as the union between a man and a woman—it overwhelmingly passed Gasconade County with 76.48% of the vote. The initiative passed the state with 71% of support from voters as Missouri became the first state to ban same-sex marriage. In 2006, Missourians voted on a constitutional amendment to fund and legalize embryonic stem cell research in the state—it failed in Gasconade County with 58.61% voting against the measure. The initiative narrowly passed the state with 51% of support from voters as Missouri became one of the first states in the nation to approve embryonic stem cell research. Despite Gasconade County's longstanding tradition of supporting socially conservative platforms, voters in the county have a penchant for advancing populist causes like increasing the minimum wage. In 2006, Missourians voted on a proposition (Proposition B) to increase the minimum wage in the state to $6.50 an hour—it passed Gasconade County with 74.74% of the vote. The proposition strongly passed every single county in Missouri with 78.99% voting in favor. (During the same election, voters in five other states also strongly approved increases in the minimum wage.)

=== Missouri presidential preference primary (2008) ===
Former U.S. Senator Hillary Rodham Clinton (D-New York) received more votes, a total of 848, than any candidate from either party in Gasconade County during the 2008 Missouri Presidential Preference Primary.

== Education ==
K-12 school districts with any amount of territory in the county, no matter how slight, include:

- Gasconade County R-I School District
- Gasconade County R-II School District
- Crawford County R-2 School District
- Maries County R-II School District
- Osage County R-I School District
- Osage County R-II School District
- St. James R-I School District

There is one elementary school district with a piece of the county: Strain-Japan R-XVI School District.

=== Public schools ===
- Gasconade County R-I School District - Hermann
  - Hermann Elementary School (K-03)
  - Hermann Middle School (04–08)
  - Hermann High School (09–12)
- Gasconade County R-II School District - Owensville
  - Owensville Elementary School (K-05)
  - Owensville Middle School (06–08)
  - Owensville High School (09–12)

=== Private schools ===
- St. George School – Hermann (PS-08) – Roman Catholic
- Immanuel Lutheran School – Rosebud (PK-08) – Lutheran

=== Public libraries ===
- Hermann Branch Library
- Owensville Branch Library

== Communities ==
=== Cities and towns ===
- Bland (partly in Osage County)
- Gasconade
- Hermann (county seat)
- Morrison
- Owensville (largest city)
- Rosebud

=== Unincorporated communities ===
- Bay
- Bem
- Cleavesville
- Drake
- Fredericksburg
- Little Berger
- Mount Sterling
- New Woollam
- Redbird
- Swiss

== See also ==
- National Register of Historic Places listings in Gasconade County, Missouri
