= National Register of Historic Places listings in Gasconade County, Missouri =

Location of Gasconade County in Missouri

This is a list of the National Register of Historic Places listings in Gasconade County, Missouri.

This is intended to be a complete list of the properties and districts on the National Register of Historic Places in Gasconade County, Missouri, United States. Latitude and longitude coordinates are provided for many National Register properties and districts; these locations may be seen together in a map.

There are 10 properties and districts listed on the National Register in the county.

This National Park Service list is complete through NPS recent listings posted September 26, 2025.

== Current listings ==
	Name on the Register	Image	Date listed	Location	City or town	Description
1	Hermann High School		January 29, 2025 (#100011397)	808 Washington Street; 38°42′03″N 91°26′36″W	Hermann	This is a former school building, not the current high school.
2	Hermann Historic District	Hermann Historic District	February 1, 1972 (#72000712)	Roughly bounded by E. Wharf, Mozart, E. 5th, and Gellert Sts.; also 214 and 304 Franklin, 301-501 Gellert, and 2202 Route 100; also roughly bounded by Wharf, 1st, Mozart, 5th, Schiller, 4th, Gutenberg, and Reserve Sts. 38°42′19″N 91°26′04″W	Hermann	Second and third sets of boundaries represent boundary increases of November 29, 2006 and October 30, 2009 respectively
3	Kotthoff-Weeks Farm Complex		March 28, 1983 (#83000988)	Off Route J 38°38′04″N 91°31′50″W	Hermann	
4	Old Stone Hill Historic District	Old Stone Hill Historic District	May 21, 1969 (#69000102)	Bounded roughly by W. 12th, Goethe and Jefferson Sts., and Iron Rd. 38°41′48″N 91°26′45″W	Hermann	See Stone Hill Winery
5	Peenie Petroglyph Archeological Site		July 29, 1969 (#69000101)	Address Restricted	Bem	
6	William Poeschel House		June 21, 1990 (#90000982)	W. 10th St. approximately 2 miles (3.2 km) west of the Hermann city limits 38°41′43″N 91°28′11″W	Hermann	
7	The Rotunda	The Rotunda	November 2, 1995 (#95001180)	City Park, Washington St. 38°41′57″N 91°26′32″W	Hermann	
8	Ruskaup House	Ruskaup House	March 29, 1983 (#83000989)	West of Drake on U.S. Route 50; 38°29′05″N 91°31′53″W	Drake	
9	Shobe-Morrison House		February 10, 1983 (#83000990)	West of Morrison off Route 100; 38°40′24″N 91°38′16″W	Morrison	
10	Vallet-Danuser House		September 23, 1982 (#82003136)	East of Hermann on Route 100; 38°42′16″N 91°24′54″W	Hermann	

== See also ==
- List of National Historic Landmarks in Missouri
- National Register of Historic Places listings in Missouri
