= Stephanie Graff =

American breast medical oncologist

- Born: Missouri, USA
- Spouse: Jason

Academic background
- Education: MD, University of Missouri–Kansas City School of Medicine

Stephanie Lynn Schutt Graff is an American breast medical oncologist. She is the Director of Breast Oncology at the Lifespan Cancer Institute and an assistant professor of medicine at Alpert Medical School. Previously she was the Director of both the Breast Program and Clinical Research at Sarah Cannon Research Institute at HCA Midwest Health at Sarah Cannon Research Institute and associate director of the Breast Cancer Research Program at Sarah Cannon Research Institute.

== Career ==
Graff was born and raised in Hermann, Missouri. After graduating from high school, she enrolled in a 6-year medical program at the University of Missouri–Kansas City School of Medicine and completed a breast oncology sub-fellowship from the University of Kansas Medical Center. Upon completing her residency and fellowship, she accepted a position at the Midwest Cancer Care at the Menorah Medical Center and at Research Medical Center.

As the Director of the Breast Program at Sarah Cannon Research Institute and associate director of the Breast Cancer Research Program, Graff led the BE AWARE & Breast Cancer Prevention clinics as well as the High-Risk Women's Program both at Sarah Cannon HCA Midwest Health and for the Sarah Cannon Cancer Network. In July 2019, Graff was selected to sit on the American Society of Clinical Oncology's (ASCO) 2019 – 2020 Leadership Development Program. She was also the co-recipient of the 2019 APEX Awards for ASCO Connection Blog Posts for "exceptional work in all aspects of communications and publishing, including graphic design, editorial content, and the ability to achieve overall communications excellence." She was specifically honored for her post "Everything I Needed to Know, I Learned in a Cancer Clinic," which featured 10 lessons that "resonate in both life and oncology practice". During the COVID-19 pandemic, Graff was appointed a Medical Advisor for the Dr. Susan Love Foundation for Breast Cancer Research team.

In 2021, Graff accepted a position as the Director of Breast Oncology at Lifespan Cancer Institute at Brown University in Providence, Rhode Island. At the Legorreta Cancer Center at Brown University, Graff is part of the strategy to become an NCI-designated Cancer Center. In addition to robust work as a breast cancer researcher and clinical trialist, Graff has also published research in equity and social media. She is an Associate Editor of Cancer Medicine and on the editorial board for the American Journal of Clinical Oncology.

== Personal life ==
Graff and her husband Jason have three children together.
