= Rapke =

Rapke is a surname. Notable people with the surname include:

- Jack Rapke (fl. 1974), American film producer
- Jeremy Rapke (fl. 2007–2011), Australian lawyer
- Julia Rapke (1886–1959), Australian-Jewish women's rights activist

== See also ==
- Radke
