= Bradtke =

Bradtke is a surname. Notable people with the surname include:

- Mark Bradtke (born 1969), Australian basketball player
- Nicole Bradtke (born 1969), Australian tennis player, wife of Mark

== See also ==
- Radtke
