= Menorah Medical Center =

Coordinates: 38°54′38″N 94°39′07″W

- HCA Midwest Division

Geography
- Location: 5721 W. 119th Street, Overland Park, Kansas, United States

Organization
- Network: HCA Midwest Division

Services
- Emergency department: Yes
- Beds: 155

Helipads
- Helipad: FAA LID: SN35

Links
- Website: hcamidwest.com/locations/menorah-medical-center/
- Lists: Hospitals in Kansas

Menorah Medical Center is an acute care hospital located in Overland Park, Kansas at 5721 West 119th Street. It is part of the HCA Midwest Division.

== History ==
The Jewish Memorial Hospital Association was established in 1926 by the Jewish community of the Kansas City area with the goal of establishing a Jewish community hospital with a kosher kitchen in Kansas City, Missouri. On September 7, 1931, the association opened Menorah Hospital (also known as Jewish Memorial Hospital) as a 158-bed hospital at 4949 Rockhill Road, across from the campus of the University of Missouri-Kansas City. The hospital changed its name to Menorah Medical Center in 1951 and merged with Health Midwest in 1993–1994. In 1996, the hospital moved to Overland Park, having purchased the land there in 1989. The Stowers Institute acquired the hospital's former Kansas City site. In 2003, the hospital was acquired by HCA Healthcare as part of their purchase of Health Midwest.

== Facilities ==
The campus includes a medical office building and outpatient clinics. Facilities and medical services include an emergency department, intensive care unit, inpatient rehabilitation, robotic surgery, and bariatric surgery services. The hospital also has a labor and delivery unit and a Level II neonatal intensive care unit (NICU).

Oncology services are provided through the Sarah Cannon Cancer Institute, which offers diagnostic imaging, and radiation treatment (including CyberKnife radiosurgery).
