= McKittrick, Missouri =

City in Montgomery County, Missouri, United States

- City
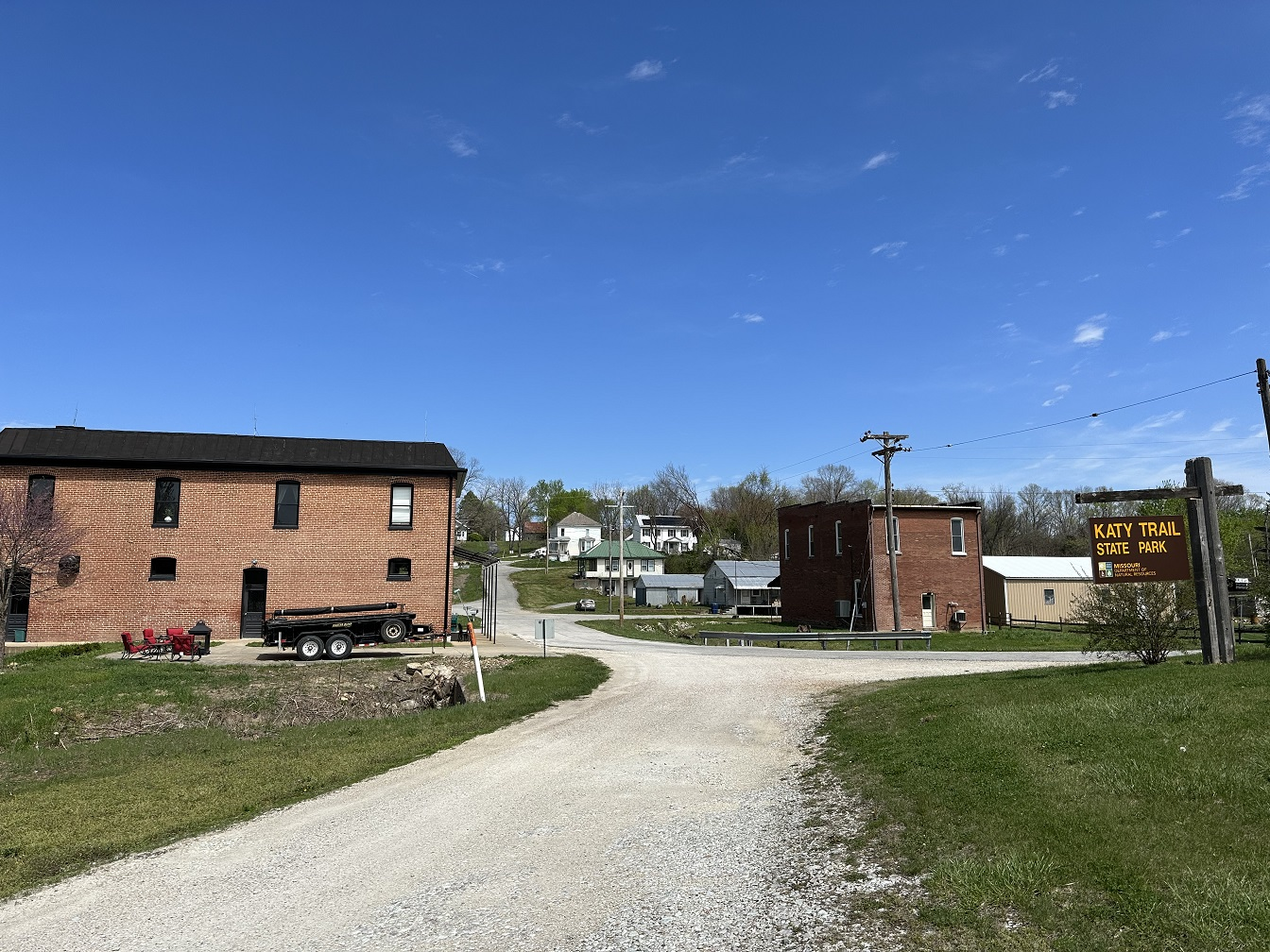
- McKittrick in 2024

- Location in Montgomery County and the state of Missouri
- Coordinates: 38°44′19″N 91°26′39″W
- Country: United States
- State: Missouri
- County: Montgomery

Area
  - Total: 0.49 sq mi (1.26 km^{2})
  - Land: 0.49 sq mi (1.26 km^{2})
  - Water: 0 sq mi (0.00 km^{2})
- Elevation: 558 ft (170 m)

Population (2020)
  - Total: 77
  - Density: 157.8/sq mi (60.92/km^{2})
- Time zone: UTC-6 (Central (CST))
  - Summer (DST): UTC-5 (CDT)
- ZIP Code: 65041
- FIPS code: 29-45200
- GNIS feature ID: 2396745

McKittrick is a city in Montgomery County, Missouri, United States. The population was 77 at the 2020 census.

== History ==
McKittrick was laid out in 1895 when the railroad was extended to that point. A post office called McKittrick was established in 1894, and remained in operation until 1967.

The McKittrick Farmers Mercantile was listed on the National Register of Historic Places in 2010.

== Geography ==
McKittrick is in southeastern Montgomery County. Missouri Route 19 passes through the west side of the city limits, leading south 2 miles (3 km) across the Missouri River to the larger city of Hermann, with which it shares a ZIP Code. Route 19 also leads north 15 miles (24 km) to New Florence.

According to the U.S. Census Bureau, the city has a total area of 0.49 square miles (1.27 km^{2}), all land. The Loutre River, a tributary of the Missouri River, forms the western border of the city.

== Demographics ==
Historical population
Census	Pop.	Note	%±
1910	127		—
1920	111		−12.6%
1930	151		36.0%
1940	124		−17.9%
1950	100		−19.4%
1960	97		−3.0%
1970	101		4.1%
1980	87		−13.9%
1990	66		−24.1%
2000	72		9.1%
2010	61		−15.3%
2020	77		26.2%
U.S. Decennial Census

=== 2010 census ===
As of the census of 2010, there were 61 people, 28 households, and 18 families living in the city. The population density was 677.8 inhabitants per square mile (261.7/km^{2}). There were 36 housing units at an average density of 400.0 per square mile (154.4/km^{2}). The racial makeup of the city was 100.0% White.

There were 28 households, of which 17.9% had children under the age of 18 living with them, 50.0% were married couples living together, 3.6% had a female householder with no husband present, 10.7% had a male householder with no wife present, and 35.7% were non-families. 32.1% of all households were made up of individuals, and 14.3% had someone living alone who was 65 years of age or older. The average household size was 2.18 and the average family size was 2.67.

The median age in the city was 44.5 years. 19.7% of residents were under the age of 18; 11.5% were between the ages of 18 and 24; 19.6% were from 25 to 44; 22.9% were from 45 to 64; and 26.2% were 65 years of age or older. The gender makeup of the city was 45.9% male and 54.1% female.

=== 2000 census ===
At the 2000 census, there were 72 people, 27 households and 20 families living in the town. The population density was 440.7 inhabitants per square mile (170.2/km^{2}). There were 32 housing units at an average density of 195.8 per square mile (75.6/km^{2}). The racial makeup of the town was 97.22% White and 2.78% Asian.

There were 27 households, of which 29.6% had children under the age of 18 living with them, 55.6% were married couples living together, 11.1% had a female householder with no husband present, and 25.9% were non-families. 22.2% of all households were made up of individuals, and 7.4% had someone living alone who was 65 years of age or older. The average household size was 2.67 and the average family size was 3.10.

Age distribution was 19.4% under the age of 18, 15.3% from 18 to 24, 26.4% from 25 to 44, 23.6% from 45 to 64, and 15.3% who were 65 years of age or older. The median age was 41 years. For every 100 females there were 89.5 males. For every 100 females age 18 and over, there were 100.0 males.

The median household income was $37,750, and the median family income was $38,750. Males had a median income of $18,750 versus $19,167 for females. The per capita income for the town was $17,105. None of the population and none of the families were below the poverty line.

== Education ==
It is in the Gasconade County R-I School District.

== See also ==
- List of cities in Missouri
