= McKittrick Farmers Mercantile =

- U.S. National Register of Historic Places
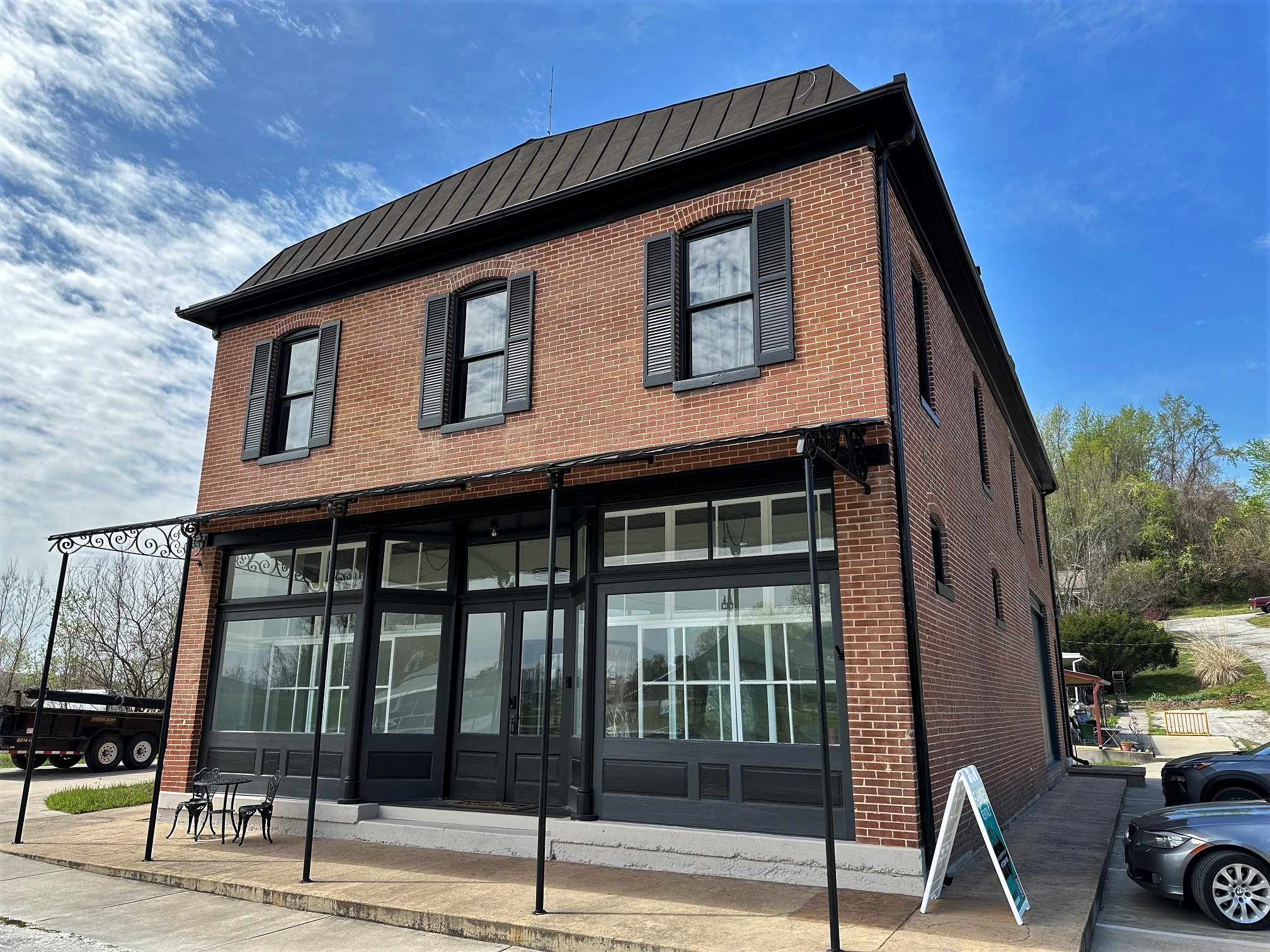
- McKittrick Farmers Mercantile in 2024

- Location within Missouri Location within the United States
- Location: 500 Washington St. McKittrick, Missouri
- Coordinates: 38°43′58″N 91°26′39″W
- Area: less than one acre
- Built: c. 1897
- Architectural style: Early Commercial, Two-part commercial block
- NRHP reference No.: 10000313
- Added to NRHP: June 7, 2010

McKittrick Farmers Mercantile is a historic commercial building located at McKittrick, Montgomery County, Missouri. It was built about 1897, and is a two-story, brick building on a concrete foundation. The McKittrick Farmers Mercantile was locally significant in the areas of commerce, entertainment, and recreation. It was the commercial and entertainment center as part of the Missouri Kansas and Texas Railroad line of the 1890s.

It served the trade needs of the local farming community housing a general store and post office on the first floor. The second floor with its stage and large assembly area hosted theatrical performances, church gatherings, and community town hall meetings and events.

It was listed on the National Register of Historic Places on June 7, 2010. The National Register of Historic Places; Notification of Pending Nominations and Related Actions was published on May 10, 2010.

The building is situated on the corner of Main and Washington Streets. (Now 500 Walnut Street). The brick building is one of only two commercial brick structures in the town.

Nearly all elements of the building are original. The storefront windows and display areas retain their original interior sliding wood sash with glass panels.

Next door (south) is now the gravel parking lot, trailhead, and way station for the KATY trail hike and bike path.

Today, this landmark is The Mercantile on the Katy Trail, a boutique hotel with four loft-style guest suites.
