= Hermanner Volksblatt =

- Type: Weekly newspaper
- Founder(s): Jacob Graf
- Publisher: Jacob Graf (1856–1870); Frau Graf & Co. (1870–1873); Charles Eberhardt (1873); Frau Graf & Co. (1873–1876); C. Graf & Co. (1876–1882); Graf Bros. (1882–1905); Graf Printing Co. (1905–1928)
- Founded: c. 1856
- Language: German
- Ceased publication: April 18, 1928
- City: Hermann, Missouri
- Country: United States
- ISSN: 2374-9954

The Hermanner Volksblatt (German for 'Hermann People's Paper') was a weekly German newspaper published in Hermann, Missouri from around 1856 until 1928. In the early 1870s, the paper briefly changed publishers and was known as the Gasconade Zeitung (German for 'Gasconade News') and the Hermanner Volksblatt und Gasconade Zeitung, before returning to its original name where it remained until April 18, 1928.

The Hermanner Volksblatt is remembered as one of the few German-American newspapers that remained popular during World War I, doing so by adopting a pro-American political stance.

The paper was established when Jacob Graf purchased the Hermanner Wochenblatt (German for 'Hermann Weekly')), which had run from 1845. Both papers had been abolitionist. During the Civil War, the newspaper works were hidden from the searching forces of Confederate Generals Price and Marmaduke by burying the equipment. When Jacob Graf died in 1870, his wife Christine took over publication for a time, but sold it to Charles Eberhardt in 1872. Graf repurchased the paper in 1875. In 1882, her sons, Julius and Theodore Graf formed Graf Brothers to publish the family's newspapers. They formally incorporated as Graf Printing Co. in July 1905, which company held the paper until it ceased publication in 1928 due to waning interest. The company had continued operating the paper at a loss for the last ten years of its existence, reportedly for sentimental reasons.

Circulation was between 500 and 1,000 in 1879, between 750 and 1,000 in 1887, and over 1,000 in 1900 which continued into the early 1920s.
