= Radtke =

Radtke is a German surname. Notable people with the surname include:

- Bernhard Radtke (born 1949), East German weightlifter
- Charles Radtke (born 1964), American furniture maker
- Dennis Radtke (born 1979), German politician
- Dinah Radtke (born 1947), German activist
- Helga Radtke (born 1962), German long and triple jumper
- Jack Radtke (1913–2006), American baseball player
- Jan Radtke (1872–1958), Polish politician
- Katarzyna Radtke (born 1969), Polish racewalker
- Kathleen Radtke (born 1985), German footballer
- Kristen Radtke (born 1987), American writer and illustrator
- Peter Radtke (1943–2020), German actor and playwright
- Randall J. Radtke (born 1951), American politician

== See also ==
- Radke
