= The Rotunda (Hermann, Missouri) =

- U.S. National Register of Historic Places
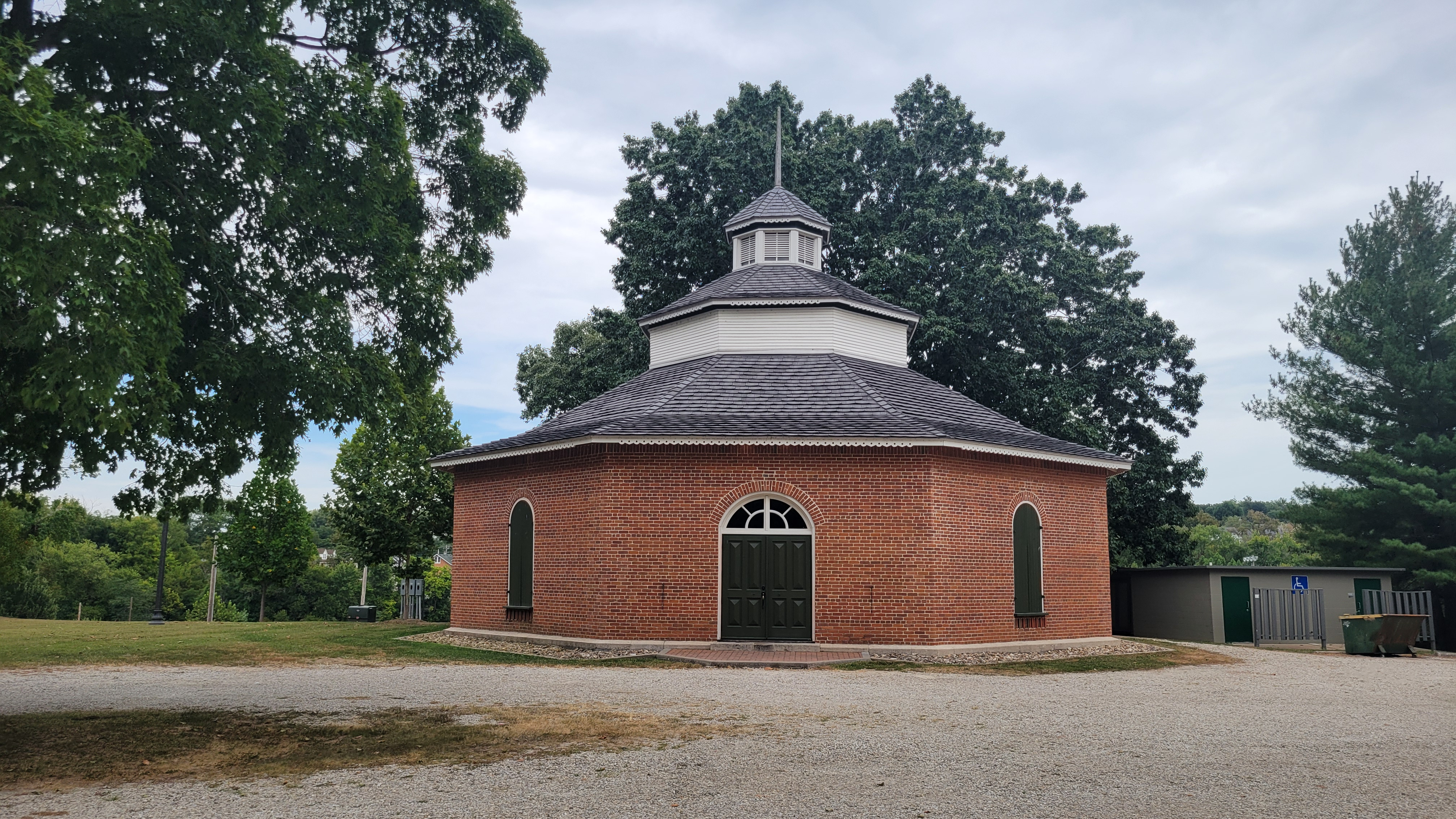
- The Rotunda in 2025

- Location within Missouri Location within the United States
- Location: City Park, Washington St. Hermann, Missouri
- Coordinates: 38°41′57″N 91°26′32″W
- Area: less than one acre
- Built: c. 1864
- Architectural style: Octagon Mode
- NRHP reference No.: 95001180
- Added to NRHP: November 2, 1995

The Rotunda is a historic building located at Hermann, Gasconade County, Missouri. It was built about 1864, and is an octagonal, red brick building. It was built as an exhibition hall for the Gasconade County Agricultural Association and is currently used occasionally for community purposes.

It was listed on the National Register of Historic Places in 1995.
