= Radke =

Radke is a German surname and may refer to:

- Alfred Radke (1934–2023), German sports shooter
- Bill Radke, American radio talk show host, web video host, author, comedian and columnist
- Brad Radke (born 1972), American Major League Baseball pitcher
- Doug Radke, pastor of the Hermannsburg Lutheran church, Australia, that led the Hermannsburg Choir on tour in 1967
- Hubert Radke (born 1980), Polish professional basketball player
- Johannes Radke (1853–1938), German architect
- Laura Radke (born 1999), German footballer
- Lina Radke (1903–1983), German runner
- Olga Radke, musician, wife of Doug Radke, writer of a book about the Hermannsburg Choir tour
- Ronnie Radke (born 1983), American musician, songwriter & producer, frontman for Falling in Reverse
- Roy Radke (born 1996), American ice hockey player
- Ted Radke (born 1958), Australian politician
- Trina Radke (born 1970), American competition swimmer

== See also ==
- Radtke
