= Shobe-Morrison House =

Historic house in Missouri, United States

- U.S. National Register of Historic Places
- Location within Missouri Location within the United States
- Location: West of Morrison off Route 100, near Morrison, Missouri
- Coordinates: 38°40′24″N 91°38′16″W
- Area: less than one acre
- Built: 1828-1830, 1840
- Built by: Taylor, Thomas; Shobe, Robert
- Architectural style: Federal
- NRHP reference No.: 83000990
- Added to NRHP: February 10, 1983

Shobe-Morrison House is a historic home located near Morrison, Gasconade County, Missouri. The original section was built between about 1828 and 1830, with an addition made about 1840. It is a two-story, log I-house with a weatherboard exterior and Federal style woodwork. Also on the property is the contributing old slave quarters.

It was listed on the National Register of Historic Places in 1983.
