= Bem, Missouri =

Unincorporated community in Missouri, United States

Coordinates: 38°15′57″N 91°28′12″W

Bem is an unincorporated community in Gasconade County, in the U.S. state of Missouri.

== History ==
A post office called Bem was established in 1856 and remained in operation until 1934. It is unknown to the State Historical Society of Missouri why the name of "Bem" was applied to this community.

The Peenie Petroglyph Archeological Site was listed on the National Register of Historic Places in 1969.
