= Hermann Historic District =

Historic district in Missouri, USA

- U.S. National Register of Historic Places
- U.S. Historic district
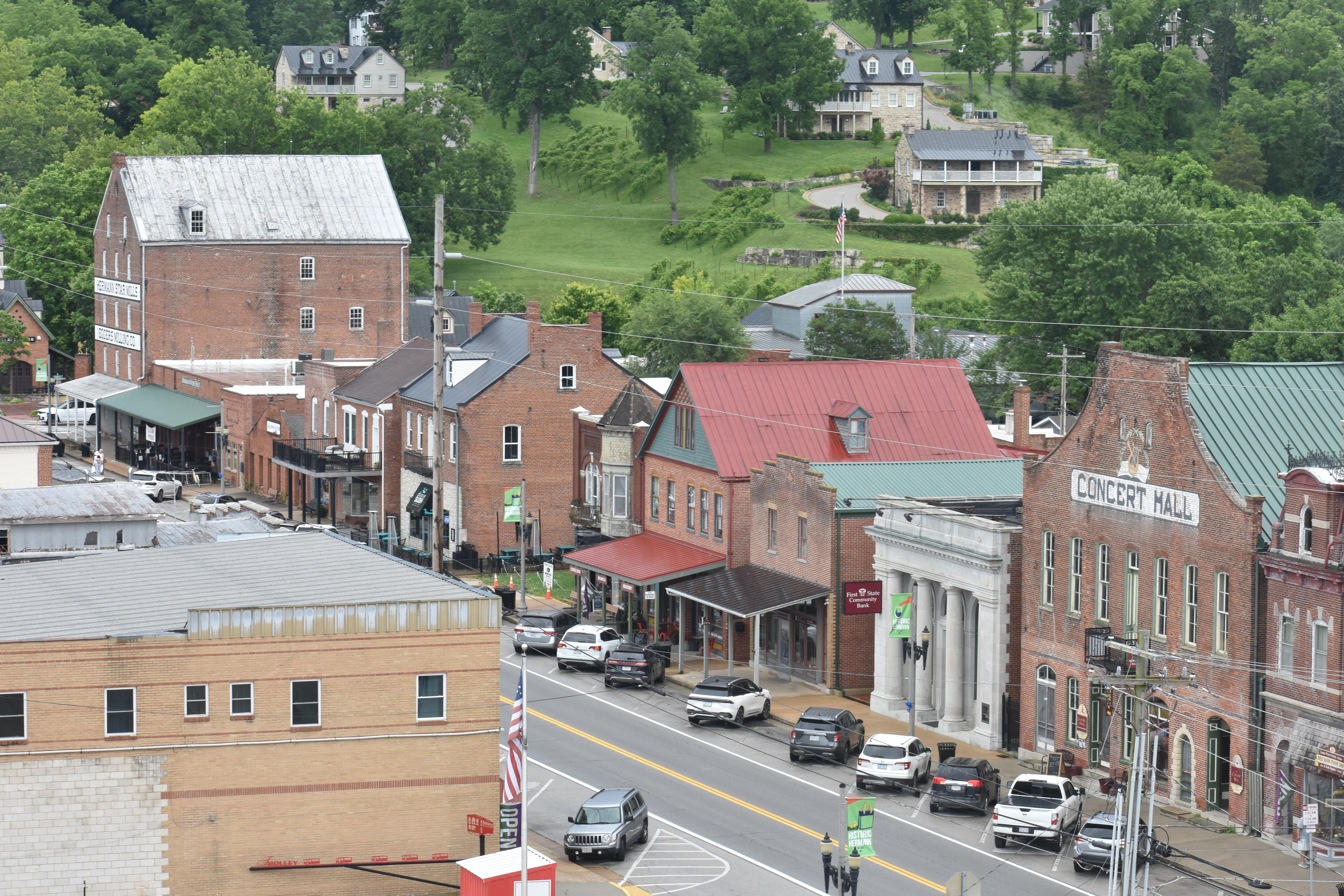
- Hermann Historic District in 2026

- Location within Missouri Location within the United States
- Location: Roughly bounded by E. Wharf, Mozart, E. 5th, and Gellert Sts., Hermann, Missouri
- Coordinates: 38°42′19″N 91°26′4″W
- Area: 215.8 acres (87.3 ha)
- Built: 1838
- Architectural style: Classical Revival, Greek Revival (original); Greek Revival, Missouri German (increase)
- NRHP reference No.: 72000712 and 06001089
- Added to NRHP: February 1, 1972 (original); November 29, 2006 (increase)

Hermann Historic District is a national historic district located at Hermann, Gasconade County, Missouri. The district encompasses 360 contributing buildings, 4 contributing structures, and 3 contributing objects in the central business district and surrounding residential sections of Hermann. The district developed between about 1838 and 1910, and includes representative examples of Greek Revival and Classical Revival style architecture. Notable buildings include the Eitzen House (1855), Potnmer-Gentner House (1848), Hermann City Hall (1906), Strehly House (1845), Concert Hall (1877), The German School (1871), and Gasconade County Courthouse (1896).

It was listed on the National Register of Historic Places in 1972, with a boundary increase in 2006.

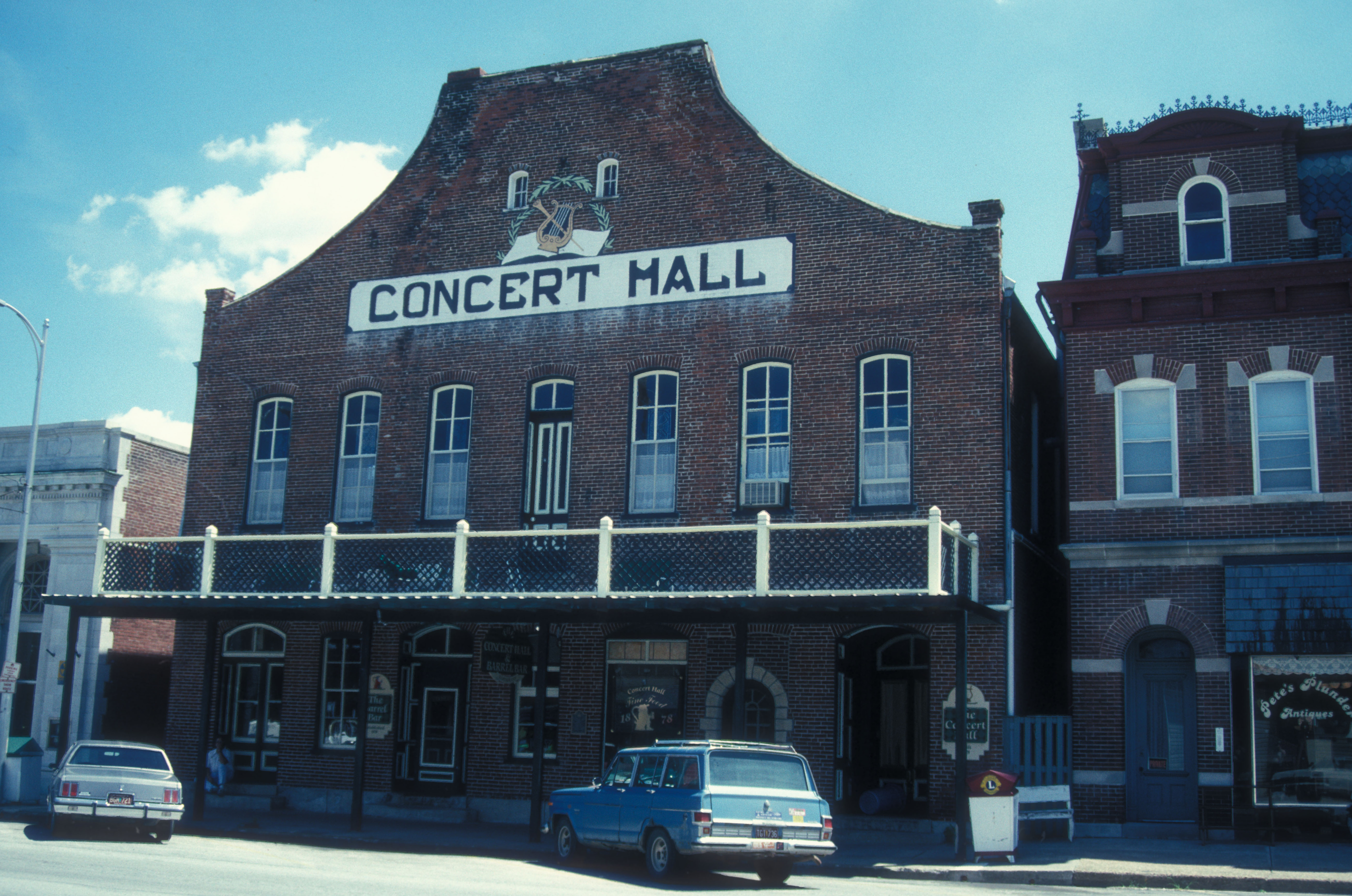
Hermann's Concert Hall
