= Ruskaup House =

Historic house in Missouri, United States

- U.S. National Register of Historic Places
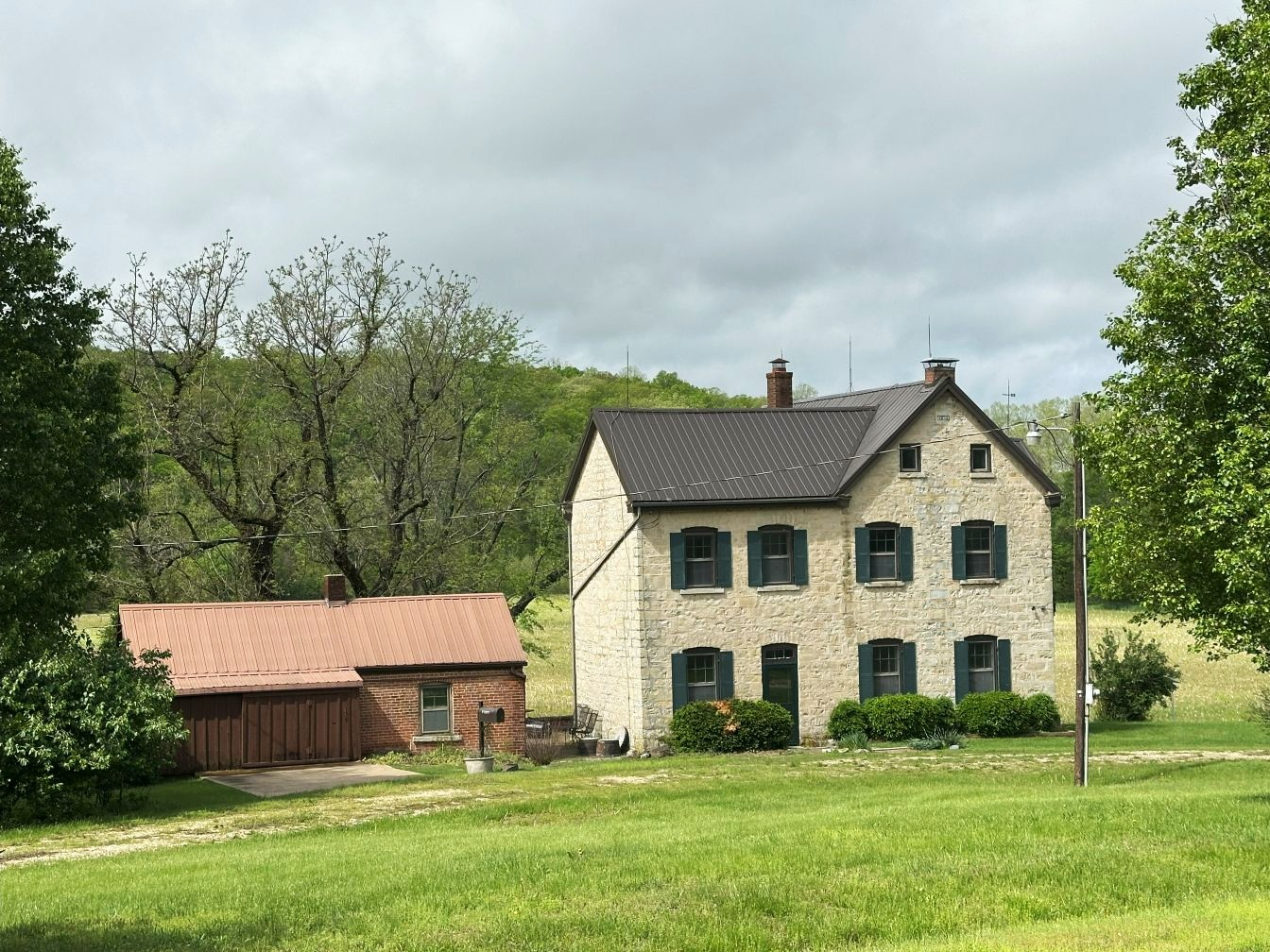

- Location within Missouri Location within the United States
- Location: West of Drake on U.S. Route 50, near Drake, Missouri
- Coordinates: 38°29′5″N 91°31′53″W
- Area: 8.4 acres (3.4 ha)
- Built: c. 1845-1850, 1860-1864, c. 1880
- NRHP reference No.: 83000989
- Added to NRHP: March 29, 1983

Ruskaup House, also known as the Ruskaup-Niewoehner House, is a historic home located near Drake, Gasconade County, Missouri. The original section was built between about 1845 and 1850, with an addition made in 1860–1864, and summer kitchen about 1880. The vernacular German farmhouse is constructed of rubble stone. Also on the property are the contributing rubble stone smokehouse, a log single pen cabin, and two log barns.

It was listed on the National Register of Historic Places in 1983.
