= Drake, Missouri =

Unincorporated community in Missouri, United States

Coordinates: 38°28′06″N 91°27′53″W

Drake is an unincorporated community in Gasconade County, in the U.S. state of Missouri.

== History ==
A post office called Drake was established in 1868, and remained in operation until 1936. The community has the name of Charles D. Drake (1811–1892), United States Senator.

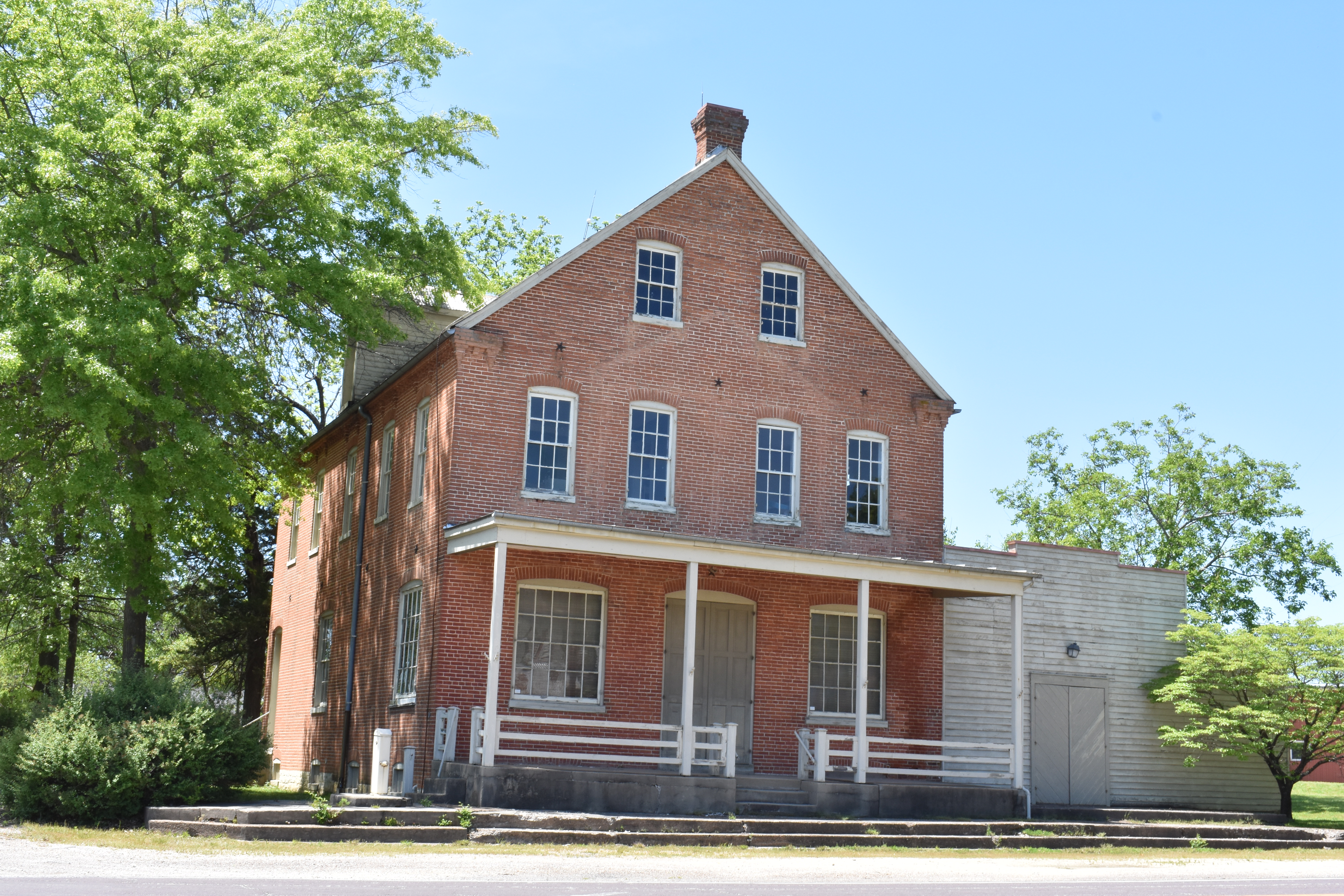
A building in Drake

The Ruskaup House was listed on the National Register of Historic Places in 1983.
