= Vallet-Danuser House =

Historic house in Missouri, United States

- U.S. National Register of Historic Places
- Location within Missouri Location within the United States
- Location: East of Hermann on Route 100, near Hermann, Missouri
- Coordinates: 38°42′16″N 91°24′54″W
- Area: 7.8 acres (3.2 ha)
- Built: c. 1855, c. 1865
- Architectural style: Missouri German
- NRHP reference No.: 82003136
- Added to NRHP: September 23, 1982

Vallet-Danuser House is a historic home located near Hermann, Gasconade County, Missouri. The rear ell was built about 1855 and main section about 1865. It is a two-story, ell-shaped, red brick I-house. It features a subterranean vaulted wine cellar. Also on the property are the contributing tenant house, smokehouse and barn.

It was listed on the National Register of Historic Places in 1982.
