= Morrison, Missouri =

- City
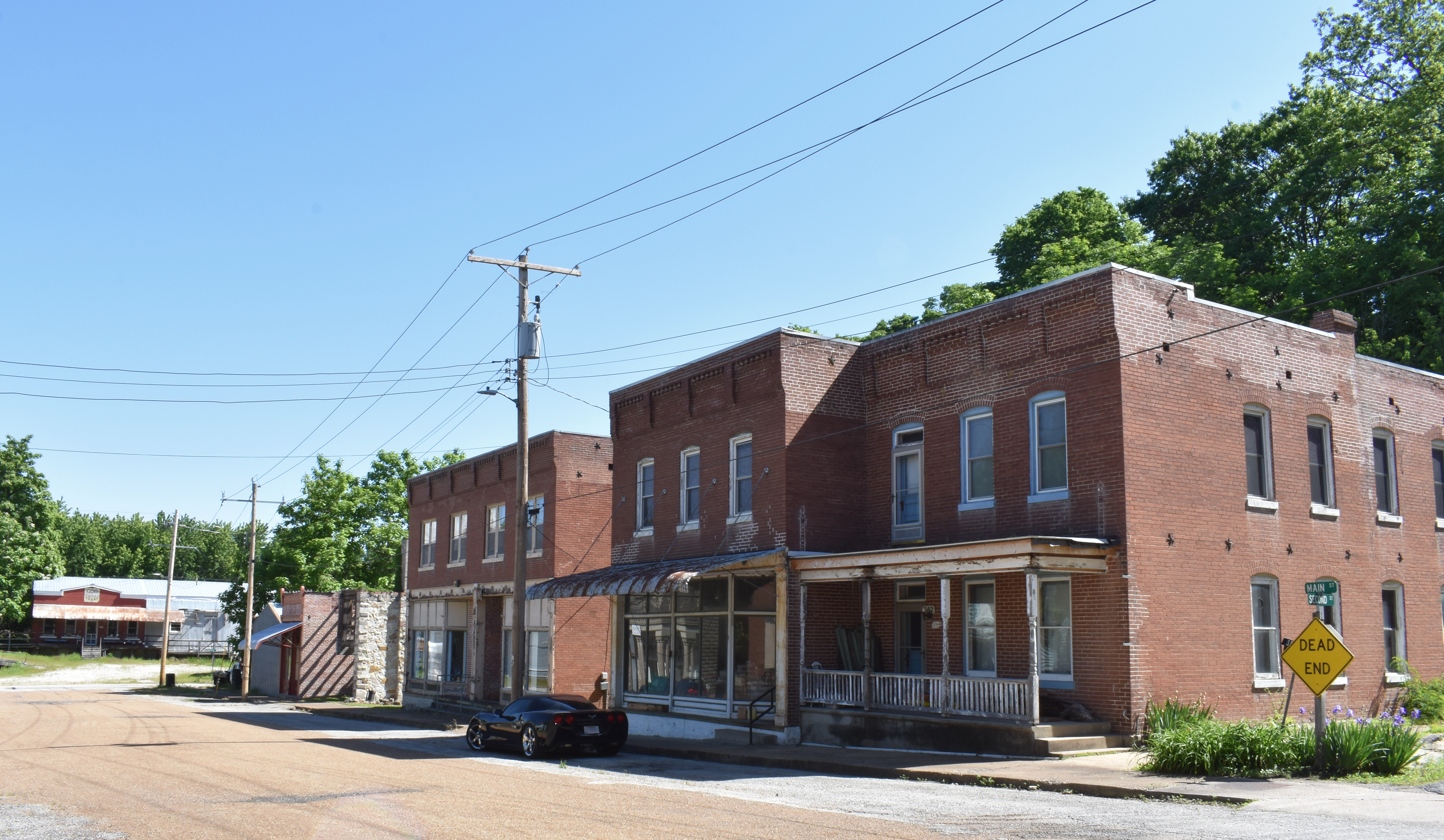
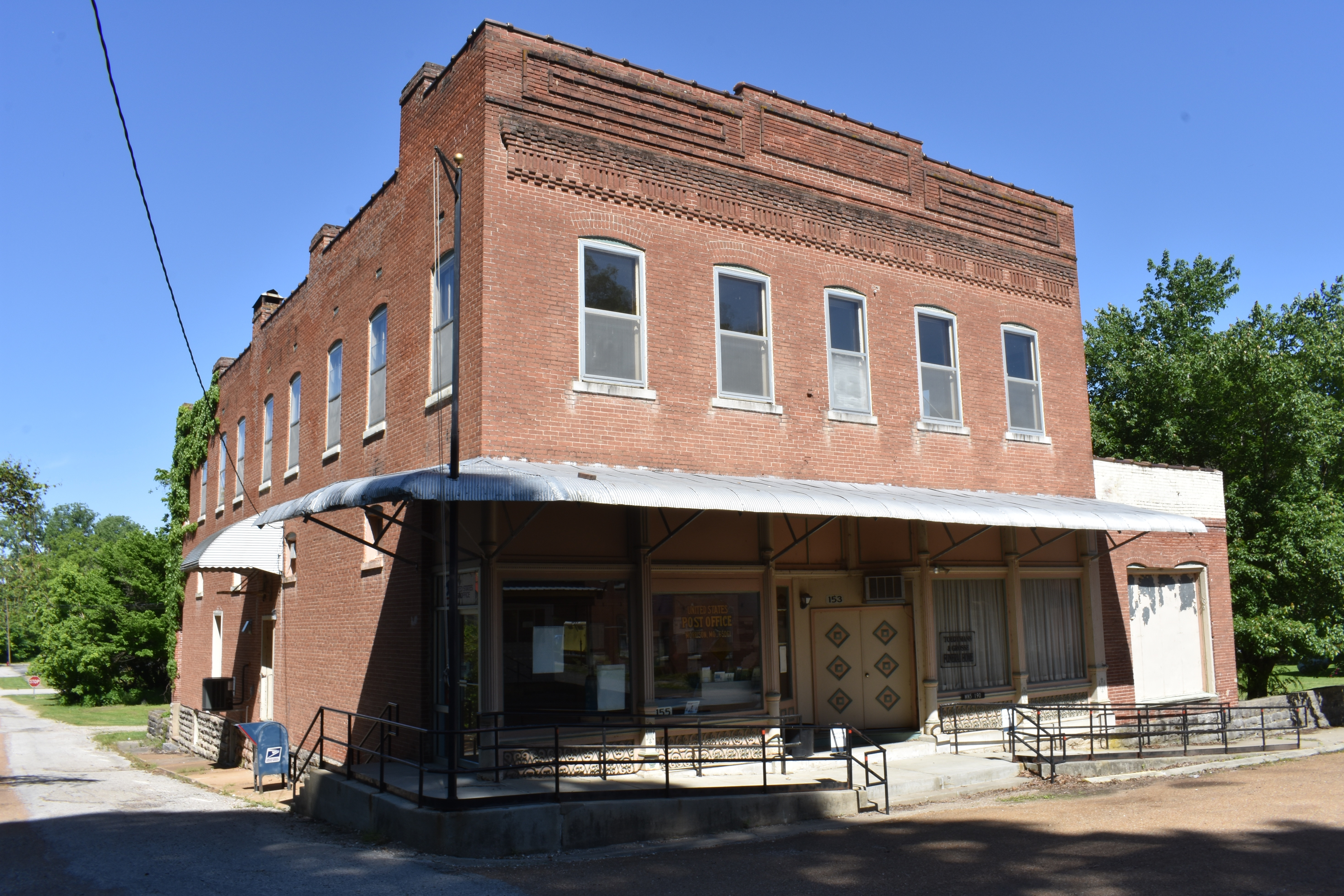
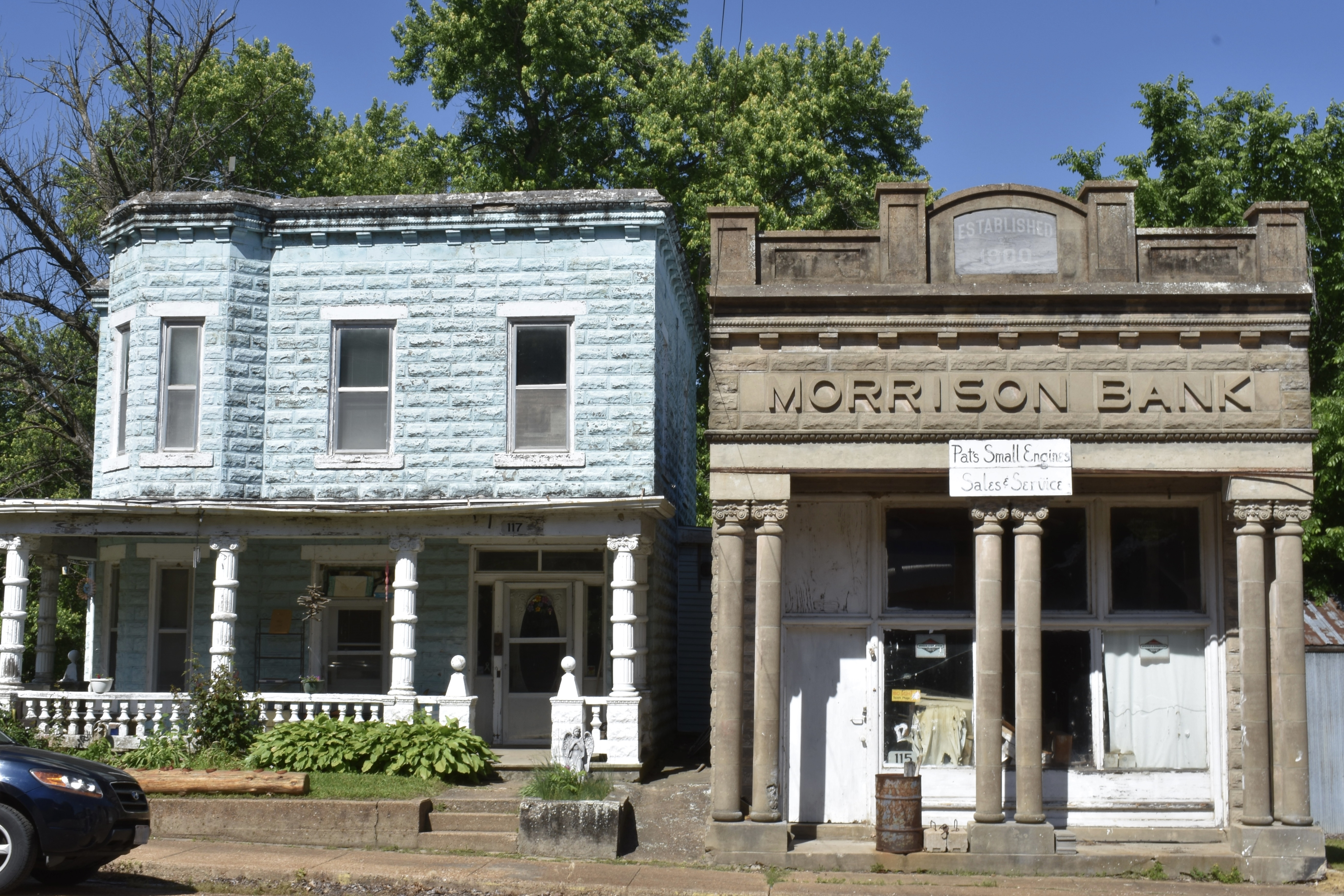
- Downtown Morrison Morrison Post Office Morrison, Missouri's Bank building, built in 1900

- Location of Morrison, Missouri
- Coordinates: 38°40′18″N 91°38′0″W
- Country: United States
- State: Missouri
- County: Gasconade

Area
  - Total: 0.46 sq mi (1.18 km^{2})
  - Land: 0.45 sq mi (1.17 km^{2})
  - Water: 0 sq mi (0.00 km^{2})
- Elevation: 627 ft (191 m)

Population (2020)
  - Total: 93
  - Density: 205.2/sq mi (79.22/km^{2})
- Time zone: UTC-6 (Central (CST))
  - Summer (DST): UTC-5 (CDT)
- ZIP codes: 65036, 65061
- Area code: 573
- FIPS code: 29-50060
- GNIS feature ID: 2395411
- Website: www.cityofmorrison.com

Morrison is a city in Gasconade County, Missouri, United States. The first permanent settlement in the town was made by Robert Shobe circa 1828. The population was 93 at the 2020 census.

== History ==
A post office called Morrison has been in operation since 1860. The community has the name of Alfred William Morrison, a legislator who is believed to have once lived in the area.

The Shobe-Morrison House was listed on the National Register of Historic Places in 1983.

== Geography ==
According to the United States Census Bureau, the city has a total area of 0.45 square miles (1.17 km^{2}), all land.

== Demographics ==
Historical population
Census	Pop.	Note	%±
1880	118		—
1900	276		—
1910	257		−6.9%
1920	336		30.7%
1930	359		6.8%
1940	271		−24.5%
1950	291		7.4%
1960	232		−20.3%
1970	234		0.9%
1980	169		−27.8%
1990	160		−5.3%
2000	123		−23.1%
2010	139		13.0%
2020	93		−33.1%
U.S. Decennial Census

=== 2010 census ===
At the 2010 census there were 139 people in 52 households, including 34 families, in the city. The population density was 308.9 inhabitants per square mile (119.3/km^{2}). There were 72 housing units at an average density of 160.0 per square mile (61.8/km^{2}). The racial makup of the city was 100.0% White. Hispanic or Latino of any race were 1.4%.

Of the 52 households 34.6% had children under the age of 18 living with them, 59.6% were married couples living together, 3.8% had a female householder with no husband present, 1.9% had a male householder with no wife present, and 34.6% were non-families. 25.0% of households were one person and 9.6% were one person aged 65 or older. The average household size was 2.67 and the average family size was 3.29.

The median age was 39.5 years. 29.5% of residents were under the age of 18; 4.4% were between the ages of 18 and 24; 22.3% were from 25 to 44; 31% were from 45 to 64; and 12.9% were 65 or older. The gender makeup of the city was 51.8% male and 48.2% female.

=== 2000 census ===
At the 2000 census there were 123 people in 52 households, including 34 families, in the city. The population density was 271.2 inhabitants per square mile (104.7/km^{2}). There were 63 housing units at an average density of 138.9 per square mile (53.6/km^{2}). The racial makup of the city was 99.19% White, and 0.81% from two or more races. Hispanic or Latino of any race were 2.44%.

Of the 52 households 36.5% had children under the age of 18 living with them, 50.0% were married couples living together, 11.5% had a female householder with no husband present, and 32.7% were non-families. 28.8% of households were one person and 19.2% were one person aged 65 or older. The average household size was 2.37 and the average family size was 2.83.

The age distribution was 27.6% under the age of 18, 4.9% from 18 to 24, 30.9% from 25 to 44, 15.4% from 45 to 64, and 21.1% 65 or older. The median age was 36 years. For every 100 females, there were 98.4 males. For every 100 females age 18 and over, there were 97.8 males.

The median household income was $31,607 and the median family income was $33,750. Males had a median income of $26,875 versus $20,714 for females. The per capita income for the city was $14,194. There were 2.8% of families and 7.1% of the population living below the poverty line, including 9.4% of under eighteens and none of those over 64.

== Education ==
It is in the Osage County R-I School District.
