= Hermann, Missouri =

Hermann
- City
- City of Hermann
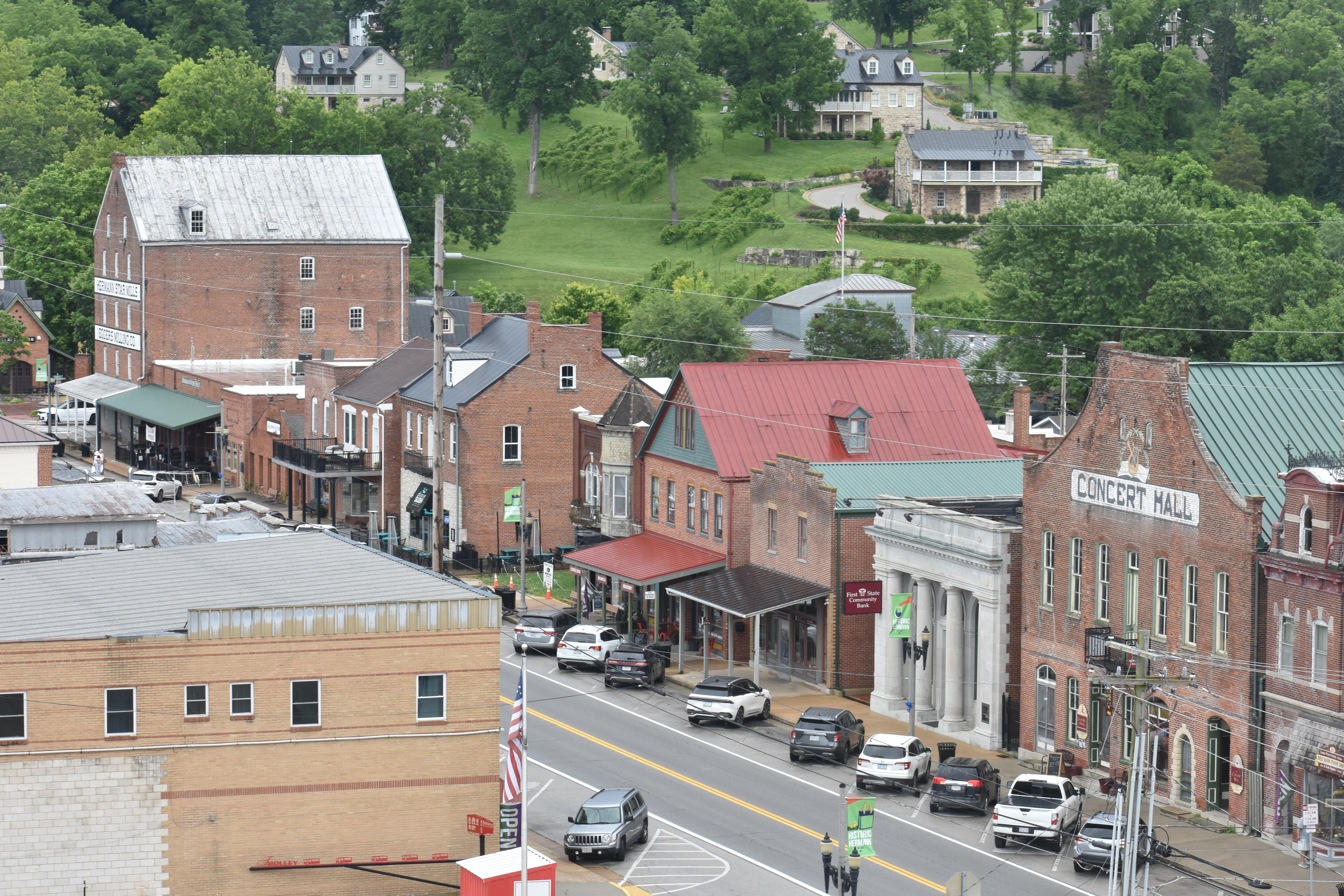
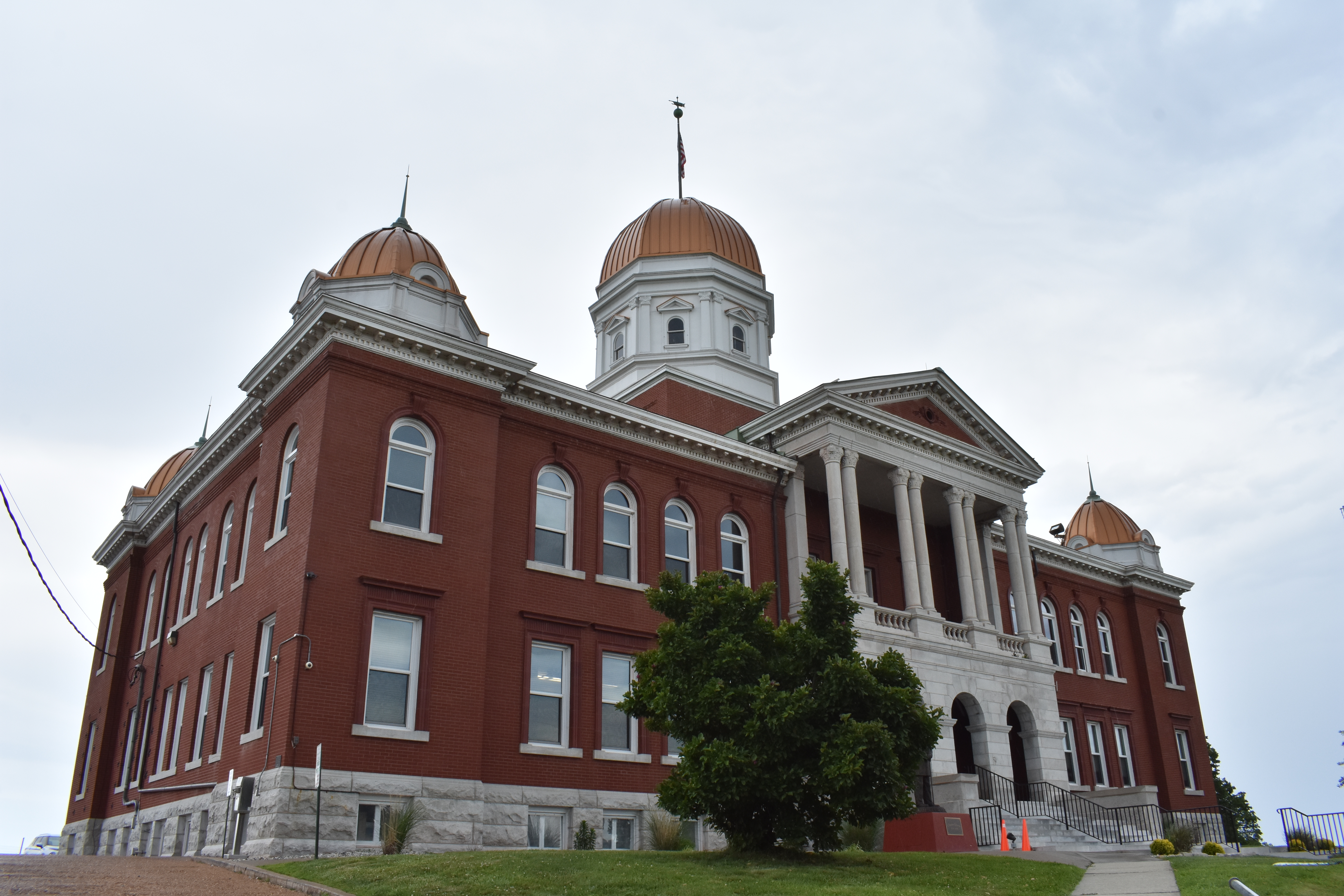
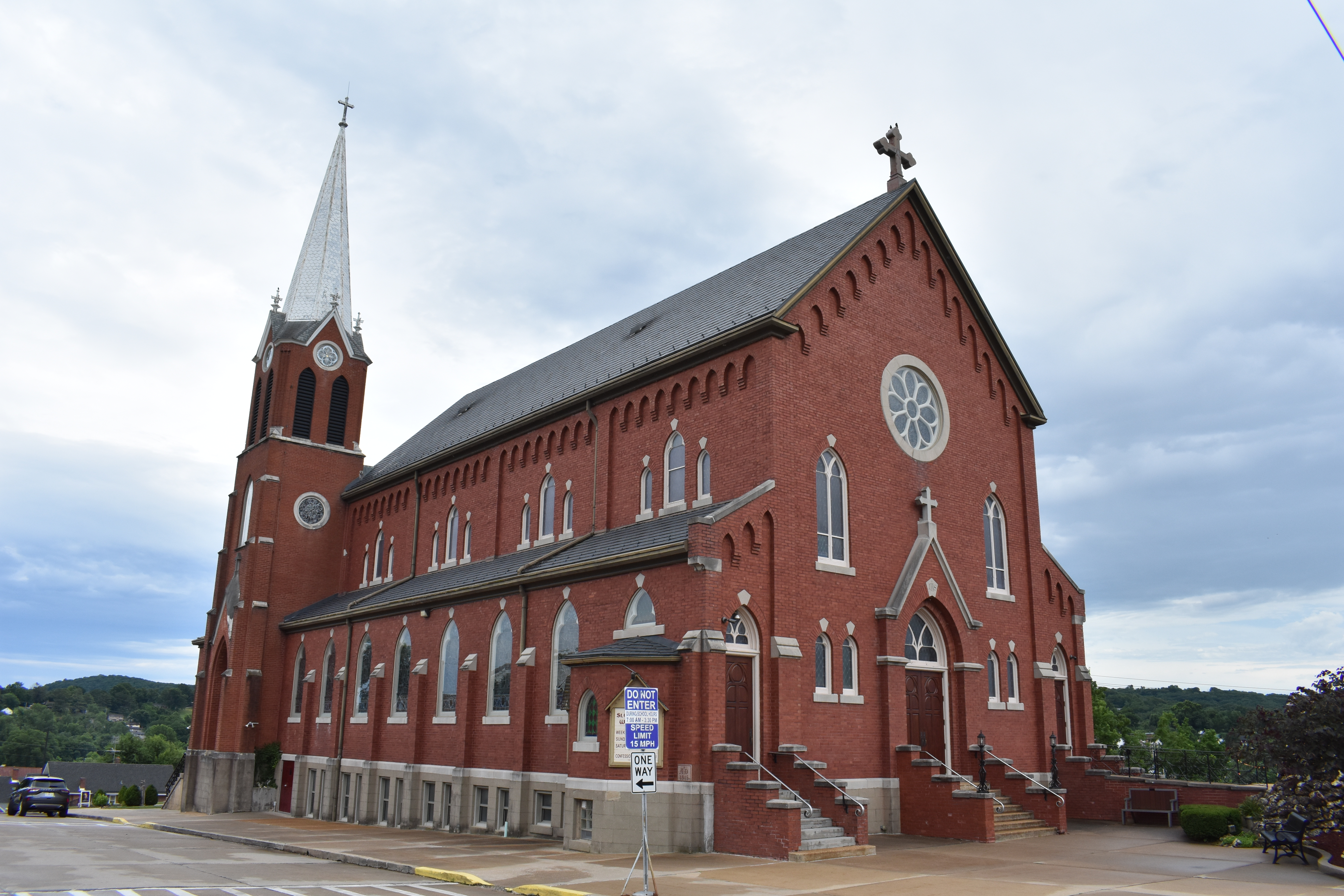
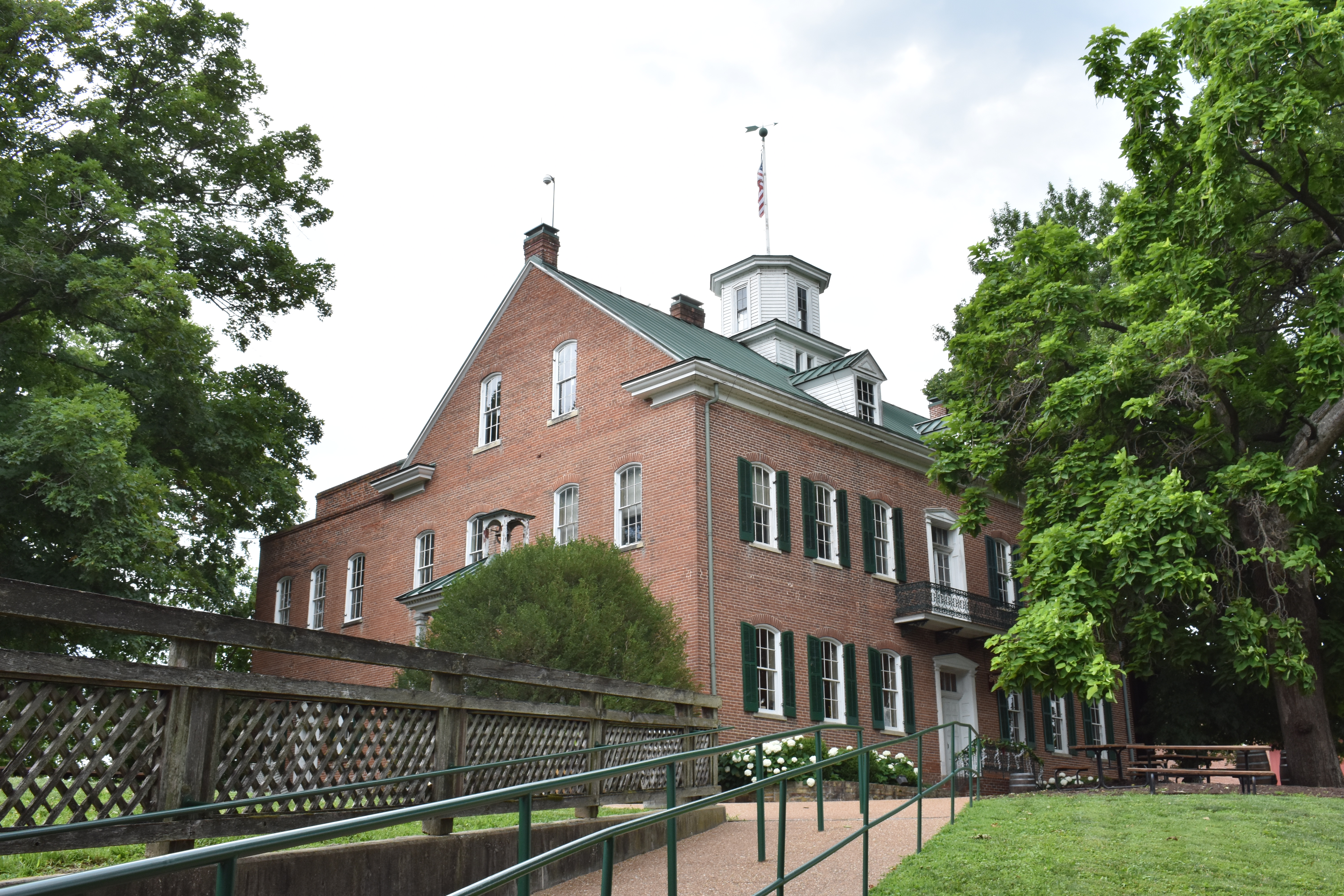
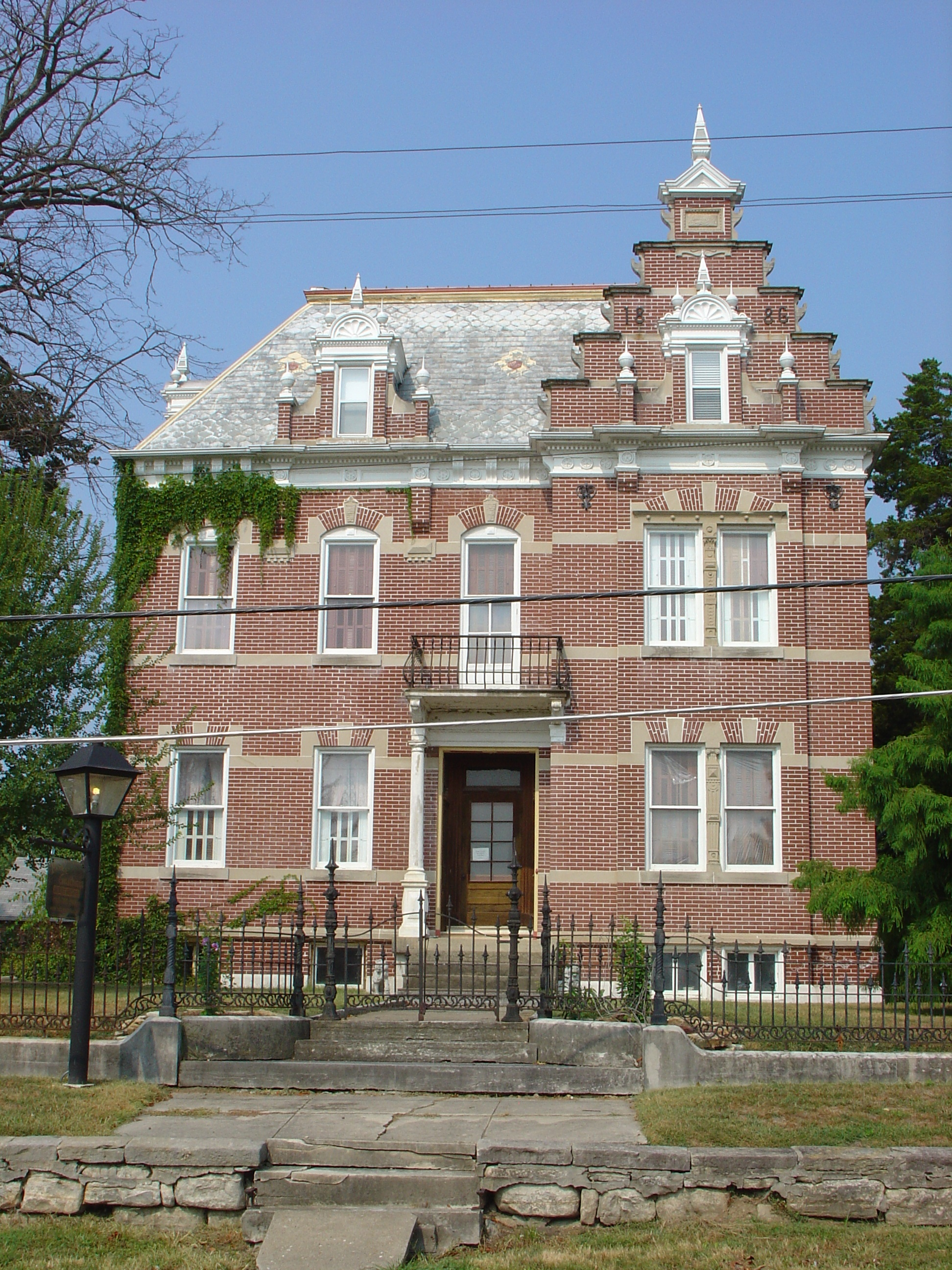
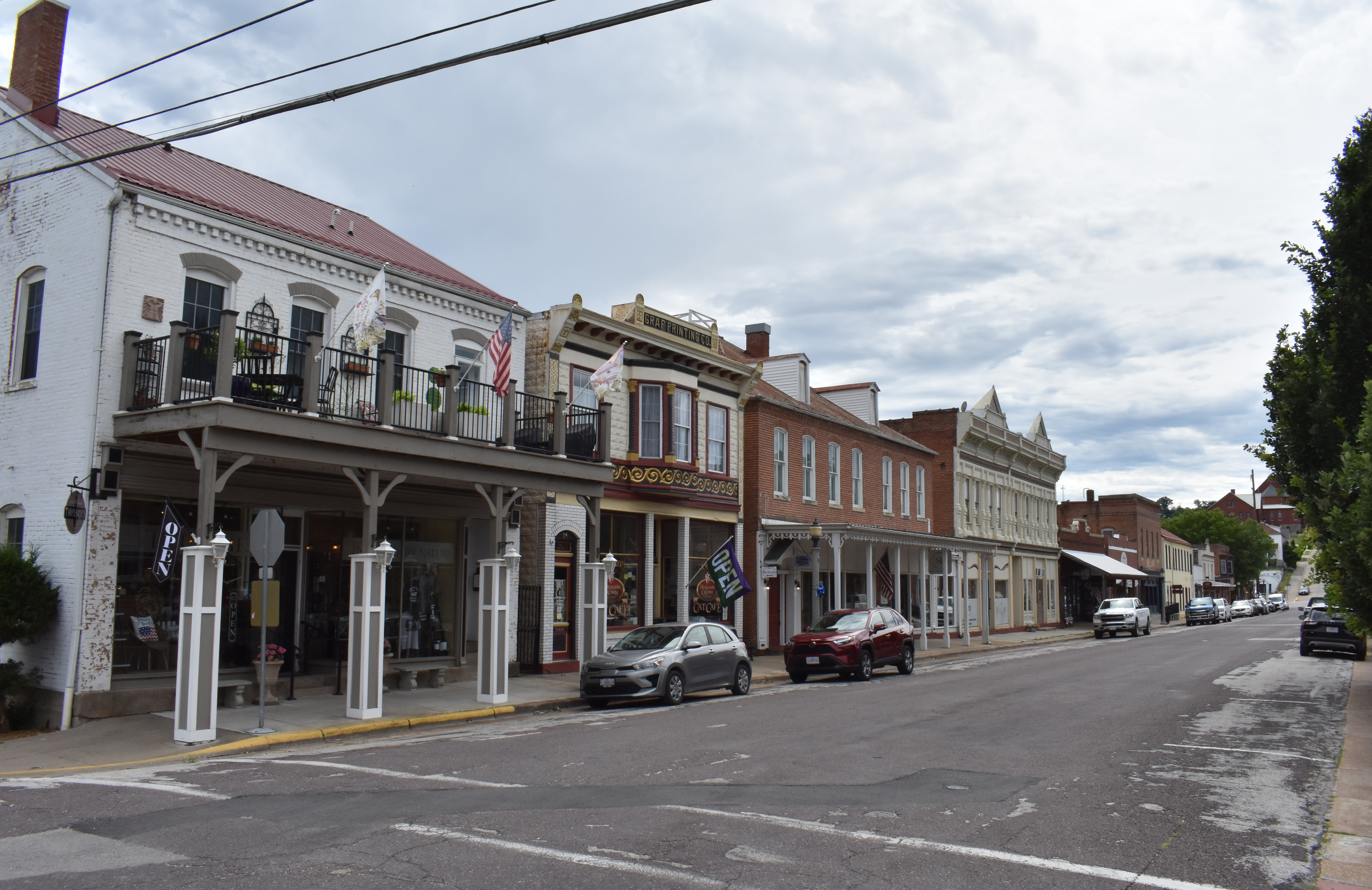
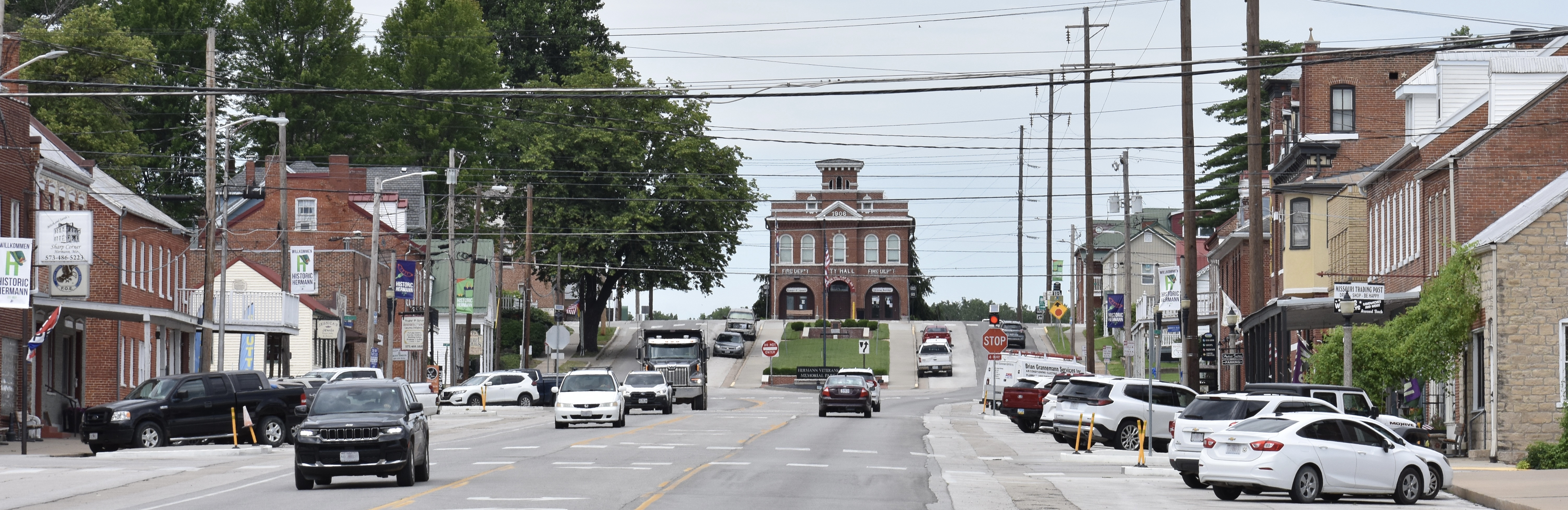
- First Street Gasconade County Courthouse St George Catholic Church Stone Hill Winery Herzog Mansion Fourth Street Market Street

- Flag
- Nickname: Deutschheim
- Location of Hermann, Missouri
- Coordinates: 38°41′57″N 91°26′21″W
- Country: United States
- State: Missouri
- County: Gasconade
- Established: 1837
- Named for: Hermann der Cherusker

Government
  - Type: Mayor/Alderman/Administrator
  - Mayor: Bruce Cox
  - Administrator: Patricia Heaney

Area
  - Total: 2.71 sq mi (7.01 km^{2})
  - Land: 2.53 sq mi (6.54 km^{2})
  - Water: 0.18 sq mi (0.47 km^{2})
- Elevation: 528 ft (161 m)

Population (2020)
  - Total: 2,185
  - Estimate (2023): 2,200
  - Density: 864.7/sq mi (333.85/km^{2})
- Time zone: UTC-6 (Central (CST))
  - Summer (DST): UTC-5 (CDT)
- ZIP code: 65041
- Area code: 573
- FIPS code: 29-31762
- Website: www.hermannmo.com www.visithermann.com

Hermann is a city in and the county seat of Gasconade County, Missouri, United States. It has been the county seat since 1842. It is near the center of the Missouri Rhineland and south of the Missouri River. The population was 2,185 at the 2020 census.

Described as a Rhineland village, the city is the commercial center of the Hermann American Viticultural Area, whose seven wineries produce about one-third of the state's wine. Designated in 1983, it is one of the first federally recognized American Viticultural Areas. The designation recognized the renaissance of an area of vineyards and wineries established by Rhinelanders during the mid-19th century. Shut down by Prohibition, it began to revive in the 1960s.

Hermann holds a Maifest during the third weekend in May and an Oktoberfest the first four weekends in October. Hermann also calls itself the sausage-making capital of Missouri.

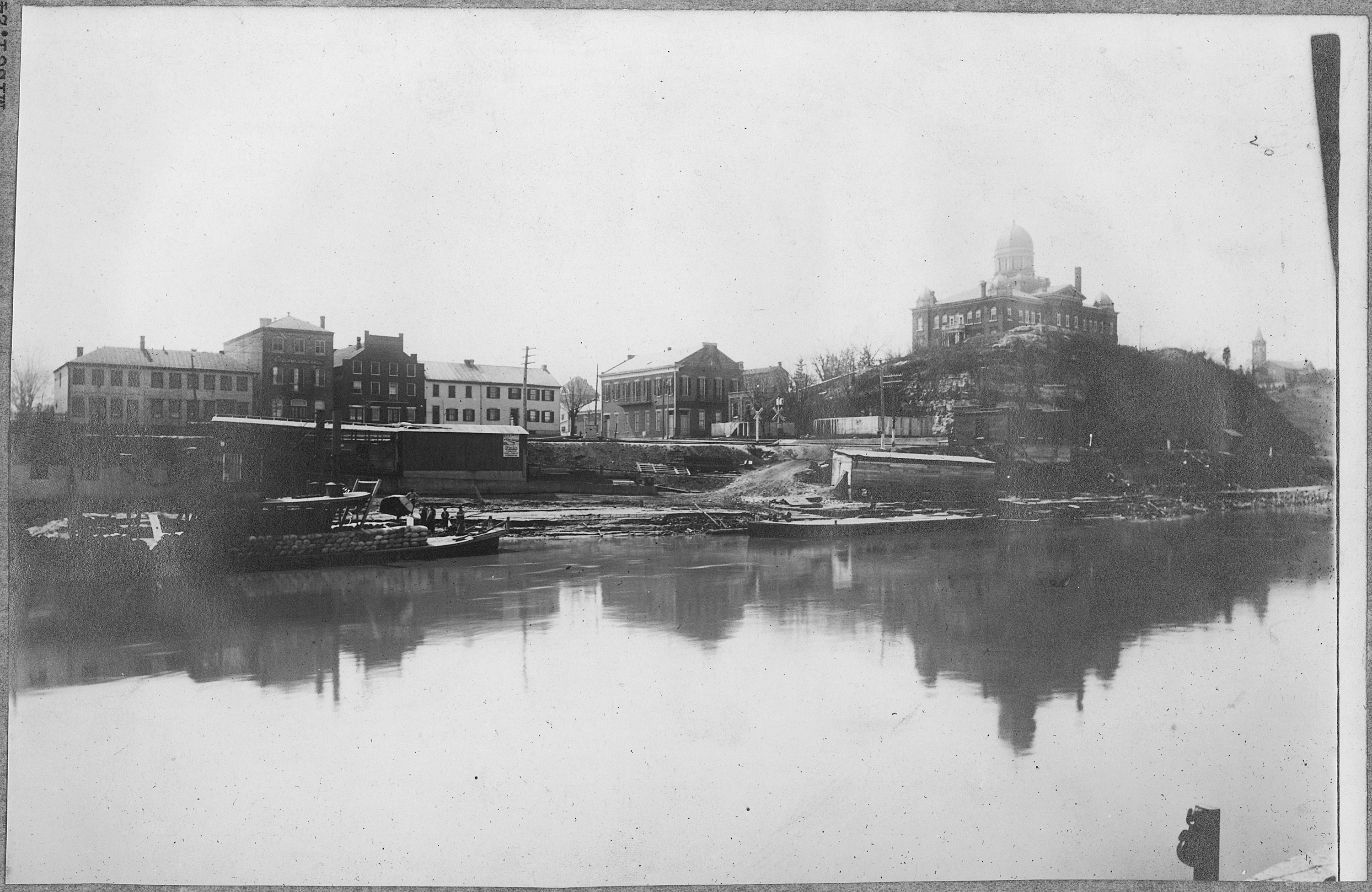
Boat landing, showing boat unloading at elevator and freight house, circa 1920

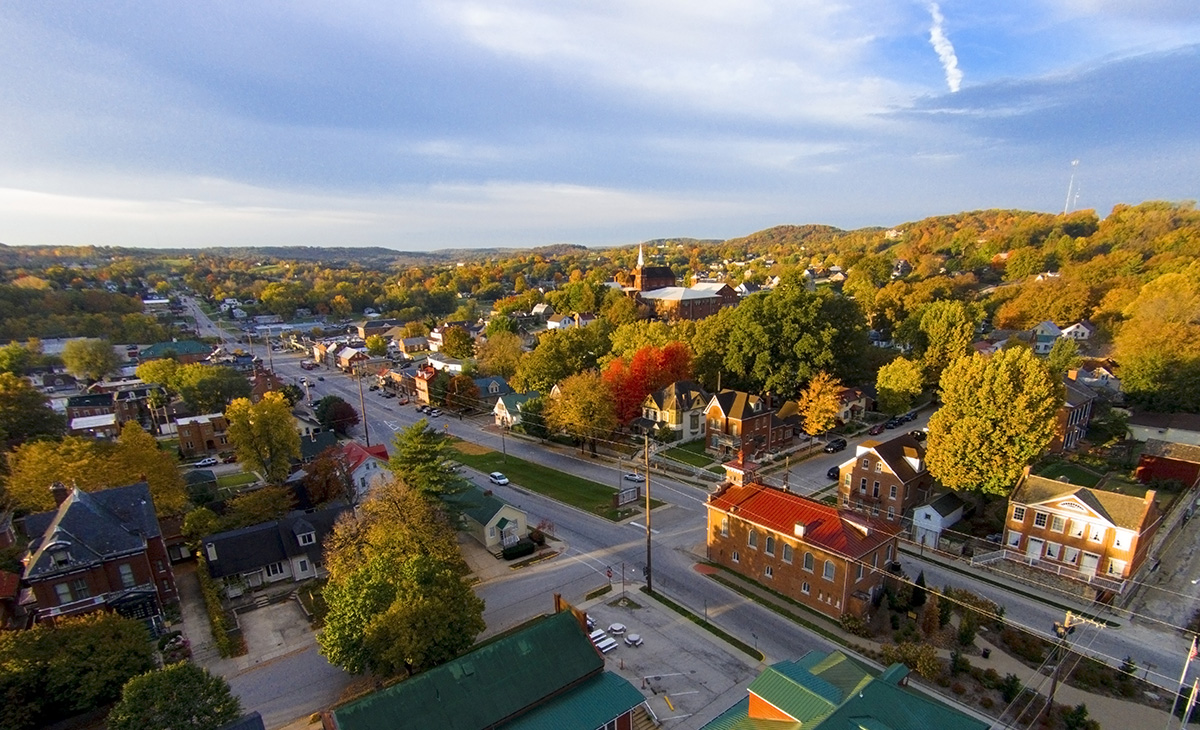
Aerial View of Hermann

== History ==
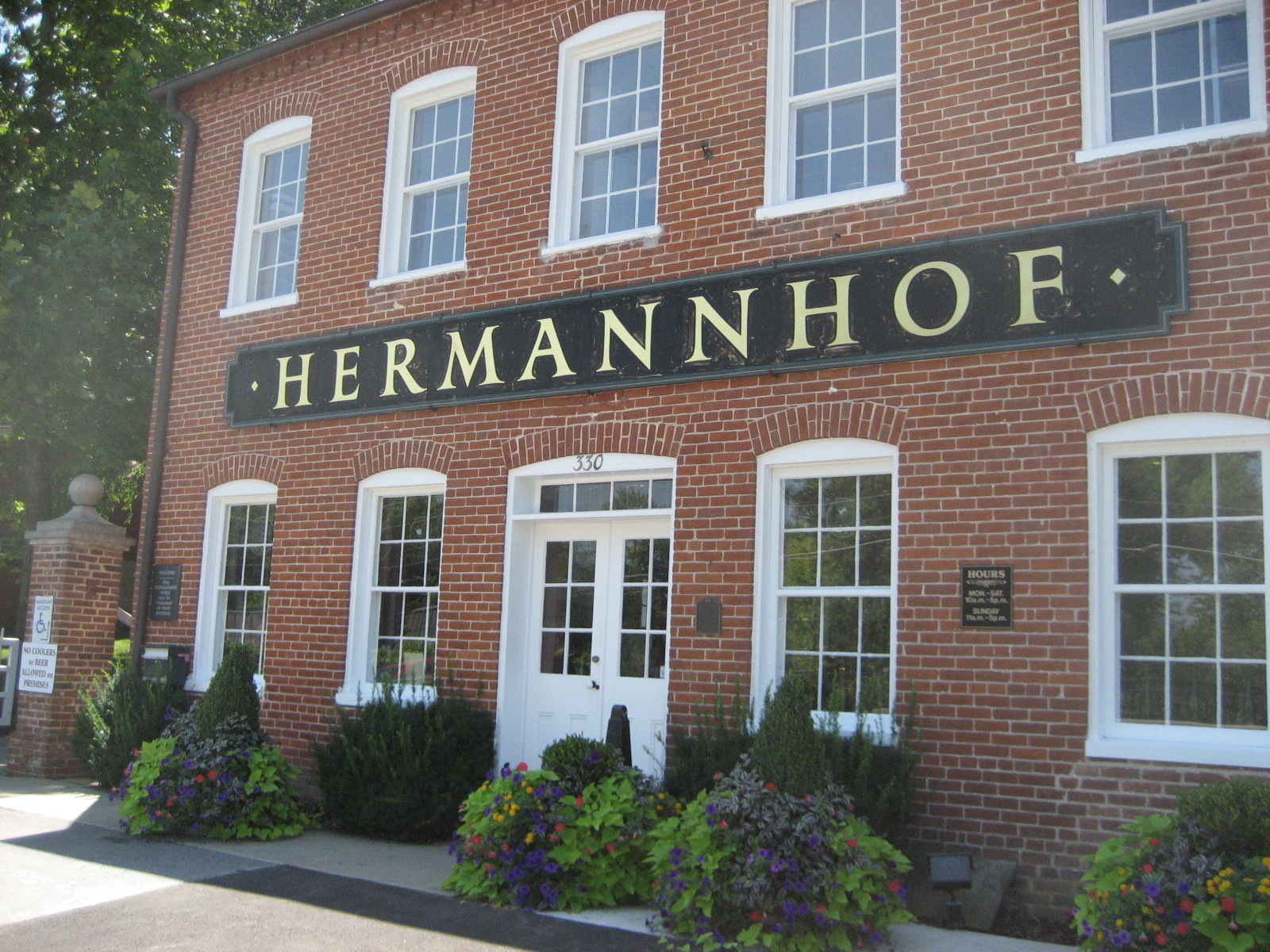
The Hermannhof Winery

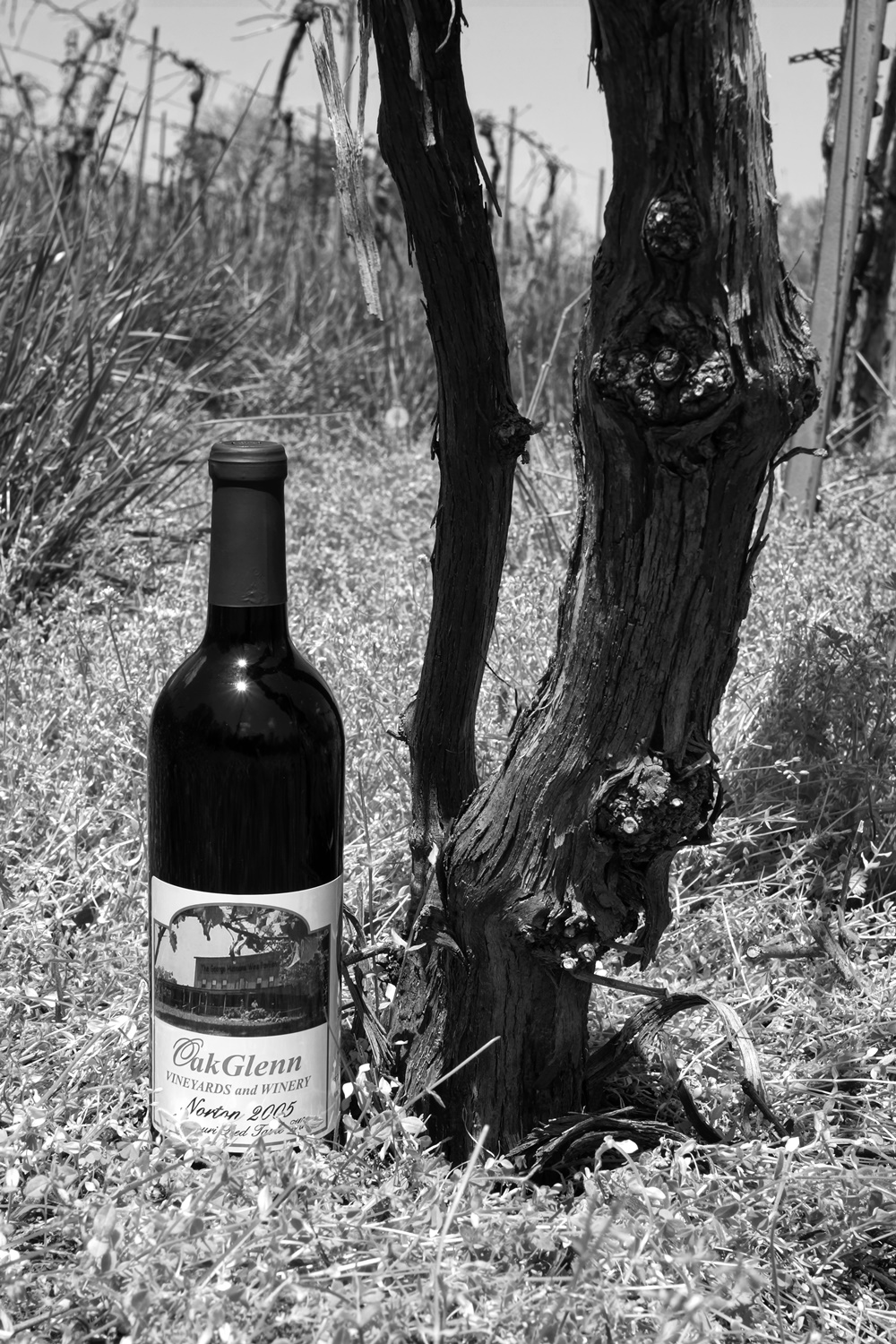
A bottle of Norton wine sits next to what is believed to be a 170-year-old Norton/Cynthiana grapevine cultivated by American wine legend George Husmann. The vines, which still produce grapes, are now part of OakGlenn Winery's vineyard.

The city was founded by the Deutsche Ansiedlungs-Gesellschaft zu Philadelphia (German Settlement Society of Philadelphia) in 1837. It was promoted by Gottfried Duden, who wrote about the area in his Bericht über eine Reise nach den westlichen Staaten Nord Amerikas (Report of a Journey to the Western States of Northern America). In November 1837, an early group of settlers was led by George Bayer, who bought the land on the behalf of the society. George was waylaid in Pittsburgh, though, due to illness and arrived in Hermann in the spring of 1838 leading another group of families. The town was platted after the society sold shares in the 11,300 acres (4,600 ha) of Gasconade River valley land it had purchased.

The society had almost utopian goals of a "heart of German America" where it could perpetuate traditional German culture and establish a self-supporting colony built around farming, commerce, and industry. The town is named after Hermann der Cherusker, a Germanic leader who defeated the Romans in the Battle of the Teutoburg Forest in 9 CE. In 2009, Hermann celebrated the 2000th anniversary of the battle, in which the Germanic warrior Hermann defeated three Roman legions.

A bronze statue of the city's namesake was dedicated in the Hermann Park.

Hermann was the nearest town to the Gasconade Bridge train disaster, November 1, 1855. The Leimer Hotel in Hermann was used as a temporary hospital to treat the wounded.

In the 1960s, people began to rebuild the wine industry in the Hermann area. Today, the vineyards and wineries contribute to the agricultural and heritage tourism economies, with winery tours and wine tastings. Stone Hill Winery, the largest winemaking business in the state, and Hermannhof Winery are in the town; 2 miles (3.2 km) south of town off Missouri Highway 100 West is Adam Puchta Winery, the oldest continuously family-owned winery in the nation, under direct family ownership since 1855. Bias Vineyards is less than 8 miles (13 km) east near Berger on Missouri Highway 100. Also included in the Hermann AVA are Oakglenn Vineyards and Winery, 2.5 miles (4.0 km) east of Hermann; Bommarito Estate Almond Tree Winery; and Röbbler Vineyards and Winery near New Haven.

The Katy Trail, a 225-mile (362 km)-long bike path, passes through McKittrick, a town on the northern side of the Missouri River across from Hermann.

The Hermann Historic District, Kotthoff-Weeks Farm Complex, Old Stone Hill Historic District, William Poeschel House, The Rotunda, and Vallet-Danuser House are listed on the National Register of Historic Places.

The Concert Hall and Barrel Tavern on East 1st Street and was built in 1878. It is touted as the oldest continuously operating tavern west of the Mississippi. The first floor was originally a saloon and the upper level is a large hall that hosted lectures, dances, concerts, and plays. The Tavern is currently open for lunch and dinner.

== Demographics ==
Historical population
Census	Pop.	Note	%±
1850	943		—
1860	1,103		17.0%
1870	1,335		21.0%
1880	1,314		−1.6%
1890	1,410		7.3%
1900	1,575		11.7%
1910	1,592		1.1%
1920	1,701		6.8%
1930	2,063		21.3%
1940	2,308		11.9%
1950	2,523		9.3%
1960	2,536		0.5%
1970	2,658		4.8%
1980	2,695		1.4%
1990	2,754		2.2%
2000	2,674		−2.9%
2010	2,431		−9.1%
2020	2,185		−10.1%
U.S. Decennial Census

=== 2020 census ===
As of the 2020 census, Hermann had a population of 2,185. The median age was 49.6 years. 18.3% of residents were under the age of 18 and 28.7% of residents were 65 years of age or older. For every 100 females there were 88.5 males, and for every 100 females age 18 and over there were 86.1 males age 18 and over.

0.0% of residents lived in urban areas, while 100.0% lived in rural areas.

There were 973 households in Hermann, of which 23.7% had children under the age of 18 living in them. Of all households, 41.6% were married-couple households, 19.1% were households with a male householder and no spouse or partner present, and 32.6% were households with a female householder and no spouse or partner present. About 37.8% of all households were made up of individuals and 23.5% had someone living alone who was 65 years of age or older.

There were 1,139 housing units, of which 14.6% were vacant. The homeowner vacancy rate was 2.6% and the rental vacancy rate was 13.4%.

Racial composition as of the 2020 census
Race	Number	Percent
White	2,042	93.5%
Black or African American	8	0.4%
American Indian and Alaska Native	3	0.1%
Asian	9	0.4%
Native Hawaiian and Other Pacific Islander	4	0.2%
Some other race	18	0.8%
Two or more races	101	4.6%
Hispanic or Latino (of any race)	31	1.4%

=== 2010 census ===
As of the census of 2010, 2,431 people, 1,047 households, and 614 families resided in the city. The population density was 960.9 inhabitants per square mile (371.0/km^{2}). The 1,291 housing units had an average density of 510.3 per square mile (197.0/km^{2}). The racial makeup of the city was 97.0% White, 0.6% African American, 0.1% Native American, 0.4% Asian, 0.5% from other races, and 1.4% from two or more races. Hispanics or Latinos of any race were 1.6% of the population.

Of the 1,047 households, 25.8% had children under 18 living with them, 45.3% were married couples living together, 9.3% had a female householder with no husband present, 4.1% had a male householder with no wife present, and 41.4% were not families. About 37.2% of all households were made up of individuals, and 20.8% had someone living alone who was 65 or older. The average household size was 2.23, and the average family size was 2.93.

The median age in the city was 44.9 years; 21.5% of residents were under 18; 6.8% were 18 to 24; 21.8% were 25 to 44; 25.4% were 45 to 64; and 24.4% were 65 or older. The gender makeup of the city was 47.4% male and 52.6% female.

=== 2000 census ===
As of the census of 2000, 2,674 people, 1,149 households, and 698 families were residing in the city. The population density was 1,161.5 inhabitants per square mile (448.5/km^{2}). The 1,285 housing units had an average density of 558.2 per square mile (215.5/km^{2}). The racial makeup of the city was 98.80% White, 0.22% African American, 0.07% Native American, 0.07% Asian, 0.30% from other races, and 0.52% from two or more races. Hispanics or Latinos of any race were 0.60% of the population.

Of the 1,149 households, 27.6% had children under 18 living with them, 48.4% were married couples living together, 9.1% had a female householder with no husband present, and 39.2% were not families. Around 36.7% of all households were made up of individuals, and 22.5% had someone living alone who was 65 or older. The average household size was 2.20, and the average family size was 2.87.

In the city, the age distribution was 22.4% under 18, 6.4% from 18 to 24, 23.4% from 25 to 44, 21.0% from 45 to 64, and 26.9% who were 65 or older. The median age was 43 years. For every 100 females, there were 83.5 males. For every 100 females 18 and over, there were 80.4 males.

The median income for a household in the city was $35,634, and for a family was $44,621. Males had a median income of $27,426 versus $20,372 for females. The per capita income for the city was $19,428. About 5.0% of families and 6.7% of the population were below the poverty line, including 7.5% of those under age 18 and 6.9% of those age 65 or over.

== Education ==
Public education in Hermann is administered by Gasconade County R-I School District, which operates one elementary school, one middle school, and Hermann High School.

Hermann has a lending library, a branch of the Scenic Regional Library system.

Hermann High School holds the state record for the most girls high-school volleyball championships in Missouri.

== Notable people ==
- Brock Olivo, former Missouri Tigers and Detroit Lions football player
- Ken Boyer, former St. Louis Cardinals third baseman and manager
- Stephanie Graff, medical oncologist
- Richard Honeck, arsonist and murderer, was paroled after serving 64 years.
- Joe Hoerner, former Major League Baseball pitcher
- Charles Radtke, furniture designer
- Nathaniel Rateliff, singer and songwriter, founder of Nathaniel Rateliff and the NightSweats
- Paul Clark, contemporary Christian musician
- Daeden Hopkins, current Missouri Tigers football player

== See also ==
- Deutschheim State Historic Site
- Loutre River
- Hermanner Volksblatt
