= Peenie Petroglyph Archeological Site =

- U.S. National Register of Historic Places
- Nearest city: Bem, Missouri
- Area: less than one acre
- NRHP reference No.: 69000101
- Added to NRHP: July 29, 1969

Peenie Petroglyph Archeological Site, also known as the Missouri Archeological Survey Number 23GA21 , is a historic archaeological site located near Bem, Gasconade County, Missouri. The site was documented during 1958, and includes petroglyphs identified as a crescent, star/supernova and rabbit tracks.

It was listed on the National Register of Historic Places in 1969.
