= Charles Radtke =

American studio furniture maker

Charles Radtke born in 1964, is a studio furniture maker working in Cedarburg, Wisconsin. His focus is design, rarely if ever repeating an object. His work is found primarily in private collections, with the exception of his Sarcophagus #1 residing in permanent collection in the Renwick Gallery of the Smithsonian Art Museum in Washington, DC and in the Museum of Fine Arts in Boston. The piece that is part of the collection in Boston, is on display at Milwaukee Art Museum, April 19, 2019 – August 25, 2019 as part of his exhibition: Charles Radtke: Contained.

Born and raised in Hermann, Missouri, he is the youngest of 10 children. His mother was a teacher, and his father a butcher/merchant. Charley committed to the vocation of woodworking in his twenties after finishing his computer science degree and working for AT&T for three years.

While in college and while working for AT&T, he worked with the Franciscan Friars in Oak Brook, Illinois, in their furniture shop. There he learned the basics of furniture construction, making what he describes as "heavy-handed furniture in a Gothic style." Radtke joined a liturgical art group called Seraph, (seraph is the highest power of angel) where he designed pieces for several prominent churches in Chicago, Indianapolis, and Mundelein, Il.

He honed his skills while in Washington, DC, then setting up his own studios in Colorado, and southern Illinois, using each stop to master his design vernacular and illuminate his own unique woodworking aesthetic.

In July 1994, Radtke, his wife Chris and daughter Chloe moved to Cedarburg, Wisconsin, where he built his current studio.

His work is most often described as contemporary, focused mainly on cabinets but also includes tables, chairs and pedestals. He is most well known for his attention to detail, his use of hand, rather than machine, work (dovetailing, planing, carving and finishing) and his preference for native American hardwoods. Influences that are apparent are Emile-Jacques Ruhlmann, Carl Malmsten, Charles Rennie MacIntosh, and Wharton Esherick.

Rather than doing multiples of the same design, Radtke prefers to work in series, taking a design concept allowing the different woods and slightly different viewpoints to help the execution of the piece evolve. Radtke's Sarcophagus #1 was purchased in 1999 with funds from a private collector, for permanent collection in the Smithsonian Art Museum's Renwick Gallery. This cabinet is the first in the Sarcophagus Series that stretches 5 deep as of the end of 2009. His other Series work includes Inner Light (9 pieces), Music Cabinet (2 pieces), Weave (1 piece), Twins (1 piece), and Leaf Series (3).
