= Kotthoff-Weeks Farm Complex =

- U.S. National Register of Historic Places
- Location within Missouri Location within the United States
- Nearest city: Hermann, Missouri
- Area: 1 acre (0.40 ha)
- Built: c. 1850-1861
- Architectural style: Fachwerkhau
- NRHP reference No.: 83000988
- Added to NRHP: March 28, 1983

Kotthoff-Weeks Farm Complex is a historic home and farm located near Hermann, Gasconade County, Missouri. The farmhouse and barn were built between about 1850 and 1861, and are of heavy timber frame and stone buildings in the Fachwerk form. The house measures approximately 58 feet by 26 feet and features a stone chimney and fireplace. Also on the property is the contributing log smokehouse (c. 1842).

It was listed on the National Register of Historic Places in 1983. The buildings and land they sit on are privately owned and not open to the public.
