= American Journal of Clinical Oncology =

- Discipline: Oncology
- Language: English
- Edited by: David E. Wazer

Publication details
- Former name: Cancer Clinical Trials
- History: 1982–present
- Publisher: Lippincott Williams & Wilkins (United States)
- Frequency: Bimonthly
- Impact factor: 1.6 (2023)

Standard abbreviations
- ISO 4: Am. J. Clin. Oncol.

Indexing
- CODEN: AJCODI
- ISSN: 0277-3732 (print); 1537-453X (web)
- OCLC no.: 7580250

Links
- Journal homepage; Online access; Online archive

Cancer Clinical Trials
- Discipline: Oncology
- Language: English

Publication details
- History: Spring 1978 - Winter 1981 (Volumes 1 - 4)
- Publisher: Masson (France)
- Frequency: Quarterly

Standard abbreviations
- ISO 4: Cancer Clin. Trials

Indexing
- CODEN: CCTRDH
- ISSN: 0190-1206
- OCLC no.: 4124752

Links
- Online archive

The American Journal of Clinical Oncology is a bimonthly, peer-reviewed, scientific, oncology journal, published by Lippincott Williams & Wilkins. The editor in chief is David E. Wazer (Tufts University). The journal was formerly entitled Cancer Clinical Trials.

== Aims and scope ==
The focus of this journal is loco-regional management of cancer. Topical coverage include subjects related to the management of cancer for cancer surgeons, radiation oncologists, medical oncologists, gynecological oncologists, and pediatric oncologists.

== Abstracting and indexing ==
The following services abstract and index the journal:

- Science Citation Index Expanded
- Current Contents/Clinical Medicine
- BIOSIS Previews

According to the Journal Citation Reports, the journal has a 2014 impact factor of 3.062, ranking it 93rd out of 211 journals in the category "Oncology".
