= William Poeschel House =

Historic house in Missouri, United States

- U.S. National Register of Historic Places
- Location within Missouri Location within the United States
- Location: W. 10th St. approximately 2 miles (3.2 km) west of the Hermann city limits, near Hermann, Missouri
- Coordinates: 38°41′43″N 91°28′11″W
- Area: 94.9 acres (38.4 ha)
- Built: 1869
- Architectural style: Missouri German
- NRHP reference No.: 90000982
- Added to NRHP: June 21, 1990

William Poeschel House, also known as the Poeschel-Harrison House, is a historic home located near Hermann, Gasconade County, Missouri. It was built about 1869, and is a two-story, ell-shaped, red brick dwelling. It features a two-story, gable-roofed portico, and a two-story porch that spans the east side of the rear ell.

It was listed on the National Register of Historic Places in 1990.
