= Sarah Cannon Research Institute =

Research institute in the United States

- Company type: Subsidiary
- Industry: Health care
- Headquarters: Nashville, United States
- Area served: United States, United Kingdom
- Parent: Hospital Corporation of America
- Website: https://sarahcannon.com/

Sarah Cannon Research Institute (SCRI) is a research organization focusing on therapies for patients which include drugs that are in development. With corporate headquarters in Nashville, Tennessee, United States, it conducts community-based clinical trials in oncology, cardiology, gastroenterology, and other therapeutic areas. The current CEO is Dee Anna Smith.

SCRI accrued more than 2,500 patients to cancer trials in 2009, including more than 500 to Phase I investigational studies. Non-oncology trials accounted for nearly 1,500 additional patients for a total of almost 4,000.

Its drug development program has conducted 400+ "first-in-human" trials. SCRI has been involved in the testing and development of about 10 drugs that have been approved since 1999.

SCRI employs over 350 people and was No. 4 on NashvillePost magazine's 2010 list of the Best Employers in Middle Tennessee. In 2009 and 2010, SCRI was awarded a spot on Modern Healthcare's list of the 100 Best Places to Work in Healthcare.

== History ==
SCRI was formed in 2004 through a joint venture between Tennessee Oncology and HCA. The institute is named after the American comedian Sarah Cannon, more widely known by her stage name Minnie Pearl. Before helping form SCRI, Tennessee Oncology had conducted research on behalf of the Minnie Pearl Research Network since 1993.

SCRI started a cardiovascular initiative in 2008. Currently, there are three strategic sites for cardiovascular research: Redmond Regional Medical Center in Rome, Georgia, Centennial Heart in Nashville, Tennessee, and Osceola Regional Medical Center in Kissimmee, Florida.

The Global Services division was created in 2010 to provide project management, clinical monitoring, data management, biostatistics, safety, medical writing, quality assurance and data safety monitoring boards on a global platform.

== Headquarters ==
SCRI's headquarters are in Nashville, Tennessee, United States. Its multi-specialty division is based in Memphis, Tennessee. Sarah Cannon Research UK is headquartered in London, England.

=== Other locations ===
SCRI works with 57 sites in 24 states and the United Kingdom. This includes six oncology strategic sites and 11 multi-specialty strategic sites.

Oncology strategic sites include:

- Tennessee Oncology, Nashville, Tennessee
- Florida Cancer Specialists, Fort Myers, Florida
- Oncology Hematology Care, Cincinnati, Ohio
- Chattanooga Oncology and Hematology Associates, Chattanooga, Tennessee
- South Carolina Oncology Associates, Columbia, South Carolina
- Virginia Cancer Institute, Richmond, Virginia
- Hope Women's Cancer Center, Asheville, North Carolina
- Sarah Cannon Cancer Center, Asheville, North Carolina

Multi-specialty strategic sites include:

- Memphis Gastroenterology Group, Memphis, Tennessee
- Gastrointestinal Associates, Jackson, Mississippi
- The Frist Clinic – Nashville Gastroenterology, Nashville, Tennessee
- Digestive Health Specialists, Tupelo, Mississippi
- Centennial Heart, Nashville, Tennessee
- Redmond Regional Hospital Harbin Clinic, Rome, Georgia
- SCRI Research Center, Germantown, Tennessee
- The Jackson Clinic, Jackson, Tennessee
- Gynecology & Obstetrics, Memphis, Tennessee
- The Women's Clinic, Ft. Collins, Colorado
- Dermatology East, Germantown, Tennessee
