= Cedar Creek =

Cedar Creek may refer to:

== Australia ==
- Cedar Creek (New South Wales), a tributary of the Hunter River catchment, New South Wales
- Cedar Creek, New South Wales, a town in the City of Cessnock
- Cedar Creek, New South Wales (Tweed), a village in Tweed Shire
- Cedar Creek, Queensland (Moreton Bay Region), a suburb in the Moreton Bay Region, Queensland
- Cedar Creek, Queensland (Logan & Gold Coast), a suburb split by the Logan City and Gold Coast City boundaries, Queensland
- Cedar Creek, former name of Ravenshoe, Queensland

== United States ==
=== Alabama ===
- Cedar Creek Reservoir (Alabama)

=== Arizona ===
- Cedar Creek, Arizona, a census-designated place in Gila County

=== Arkansas ===
- Cedar Creek, Arkansas, an unincorporated community

=== California ===
- Cedar Creek (Pacheco Creek), a tributary of Pacheco Creek in Santa Clara County
- Cedar Creek (South Fork Eel River), a tributary of the South Fork Eel River in Mendocino County
- Cedar Creek (South Fork Pit River), a tributary of the Pit River in Lassen County
- Cedar Creek, the fictional setting of the 1995 film Outbreak.

=== Connecticut ===
- Cedar Creek (Connecticut), lake-like tidal creek in Fairfield County

=== Delaware ===
- Cedar Creek, Delaware
- Cedar Creek Hundred, an unincorporated subdivision of Sussex County, Delaware

=== Georgia ===
- Cedar Creek (Georgia), a stream in Floyd and Polk counties
- Cedar Creek, the former name for Vickery Creek, a tributary of the Chattahoochee River

=== Indiana ===
- Cedar Creek (Indiana), a tributary of the St. Joseph River in the Lake Erie watershed
- Cedar Creek Canyon (Indiana)

=== Iowa ===
- Cedar Creek (Skunk River tributary), a tributary of the Skunk River

=== Kansas ===
- Cedar Creek (Kansas)

=== Kentucky ===
- Cedar Creek (Dix River)
- Cedar Creek Lake (Kentucky)

=== Michigan ===
- Cedar Creek (Michigan)

=== Minnesota ===
- Cedar Creek (Mississippi River), a stream in Winona County
- Cedar Creek Ecosystem Science Reserve, a long-term biodiversity research preserve

=== Missouri ===
- Cedar Creek, Missouri, an unincorporated community
- Cedar Creek (Big River tributary)
- Cedar Creek (Current River tributary)
- Cedar Creek (Des Moines River tributary)
- Cedar Creek (Henry County, Missouri)
- Cedar Creek (Bull Shoals Lake tributary)
- Cedar Creek (Loose Creek tributary)
- Cedar Creek (Missouri River tributary)
- Cedar Creek (Sac River tributary)
- Cedar Creek (Salt Creek tributary)
- Cedar Creek (Shoal Creek tributary)

=== Nebraska ===
- Cedar Creek, Nebraska, a city
- Cedar Creek (Platte River tributary), a stream in Nebraska

=== New Jersey ===
- Cedar Creek (Barnegat Bay), a tributary of Barnegat Bay in Ocean County
- Cedar Creek (Delaware Bay), an estuary of Delaware Bay in Cumberland County
- Cedar Creek High School (New Jersey), a high school in Egg Harbor City, New Jersey

=== New York ===
- Cedar Creek Park (Seaford), a Nassau County, Long Island park located on Merrick Road east of Wantagh Avenue

=== North Carolina ===
- Cedar Creek (Deep River tributary, Chatham), a stream in Chatham County, North Carolina
- Cedar Creek (Cape Fear River tributary), a stream in Harnett County, North Carolina
- Cedar Creek (Uwharrie River tributary), a stream in Montgomery County, North Carolina
- Cedar Creek (Deep River tributary, Moore), a stream in Moore County, North Carolina

=== North Dakota ===
- Cedar Creek (North Dakota), a tributary of the Cannonball River

=== Ohio ===
- Cedar Creek Mine Ride, roller coaster

=== Oklahoma ===
- Cedar Creek Golf Course at Beavers Bend

=== Pennsylvania ===
- Cedar Creek (Youghiogheny River tributary), a stream in Westmoreland County

=== Texas ===
- Cedar Creek (Trinity River tributary)
- Cedar Creek Reservoir (Texas)
- Cedar Creek (Johnson County, Texas)
- Cedar Creek, Texas, an unincorporated community in Bastrop County

=== Utah ===
- Cedar Creek, Utah, a ghost town

=== Virginia ===
- Cedar Creek (James River), a tributary of the James River
- Cedar Creek (North Fork Shenandoah River), a tributary of the North Fork Shenandoah River
- Battle of Cedar Creek, American Civil War
  - Cedar Creek and Belle Grove National Historical Park, a site commemorating the battle

=== West Virginia ===
- Cedar Creek (West Virginia), a tributary of the Little Kanawha River
- Cedar Creek State Park

=== Wisconsin ===
- Cedar Creek, Wisconsin, an unincorporated community
- Cedar Creek (Wisconsin), a tributary of the Milwaukee River

== See also ==
- Cedar Creek Township (disambiguation)
- Cedar Branch
- Cedar Brook (disambiguation)
- Cedar Fork (disambiguation)
- Cedar River (disambiguation)
- Cedar Run (disambiguation)
