= Cedar Creek Township, Michigan =

Cedar Creek Township is the name of some places in the U.S. state of Michigan:

- Cedar Creek Township, Muskegon County, Michigan
- Cedar Creek Township, Wexford County, Michigan

== See also ==
- Cedar Creek, Barry County, Michigan, an unincorporated community in Hope Township
- Cedar Creek (Michigan), any of several streams
- Cedar Creek Township (disambiguation)
