= Rising Sun Inn, Millfield =

Rising Sun Inn
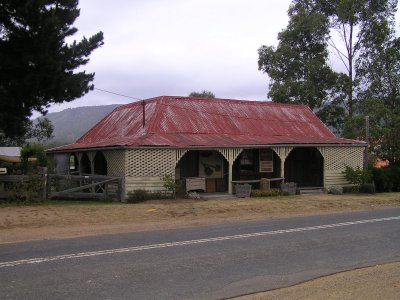

- Location within New South Wales Location within Australia
- 32.8893°S 151.2531°E
- Location: 95–97 Wollombi Road, Millfield, City of Cessnock, New South Wales, Australia

History
- Built: 1832–1838

New South Wales Heritage Register
- Official name: Rising Sun Inn (former)
- Type: state heritage (built)
- Designated: 2 April 1999
- Reference no.: 529
- Type: Inn/Tavern
- Category: Commercial
- Builders: Unknown

Rising Sun Inn is a heritage-listed former post office, inn, general store and residence and now museum, craft shop and art gallery at 95–97 Wollombi Road, Millfield, City of Cessnock, New South Wales, Australia. It was built from 1832 to 1838. It was added to the New South Wales State Heritage Register on 2 April 1999.

== History ==
On 24 May 1826, about 300 convicts in groups of 50 to 60 were used to construct the Great North Road from Castle Hill via Wiseman's Ferry to Maitland. During this time many Inns were established along the route. Pat Dowlan's Inn was recorded as early as 1832 in the postal directory. Of about 12 inns between Wollombi and Millfield, at least 5 were within 1.3 miles of Millfield.

Millfield began as a cluster of buildings on the Great North Road and was named for the large flour mill of which only a few posts remain, but it is better known today for its sawmills.

The Rising Sun Inn was built c. 1838 on land granted to William Smith in 1828. The earliest licence No. 214 was given to John McDougall on 27 June 1838. John McDougall was famed for his floggings of convicts whilst overseer of the Great Northern Road.

It is believed several convicts sought revenge on the former overseer by staging bushranger-style attacks on the Inn. The second publican was Thomas Pendergast, another colourful character. In December 1840 McDougall was visiting Pendergast at the inn, where they were held up by Edward (Jew Boy) Davis and his gang of bushrangers. Pendergast was robbed of 13 pounds and McDougall given a dozen strokes with a bullock whip in revenge for his treatment of convicts as overseer.

The Maitland Mercury (28 April 1857 and 30 April 1857) claimed the inn was destroyed by fire. Others claim the report is incorrect, that it was the house next door, owned by another publican, which was destroyed. If the inn was destroyed it was quickly rebuilt, since again the Maitland Mercury referred to a theft from The Rising Sun Inn on 11 June 1857.

The building remained an Inn until about 1866, when Charles Beany bought it and used it as a general store. In March of the same year the postal service was transferred to the inn. From about 1895 to 1980 it was a residence owned by some of the early pioneering families in the district.

The building was rundown and due to be demolished prior to its restoration which began in 1980. It was necessary to replace all windows and doors, water and power and to level the floor, which in part had sunk 18 inches. The western wall was at some stage covered with weatherboards which have recently been removed. Internal walls in this section have been removed and the ceiling posts repositioned. Some floor boards in the original section have been replaced using boards from elsewhere in the building.

The Rising Sun Inn is now used as a museum, gallery and craft shop.

== Description ==
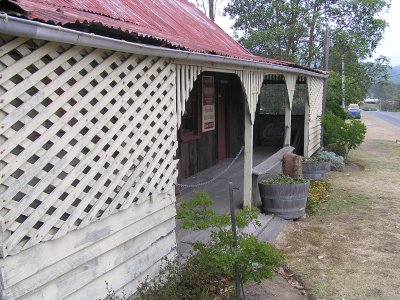
Verandah

The Rising Sun Inn is a simple vernacular cottage, constructed of vertical ironbark slab walls and doubled gabled roof. A verandah to front and sides on timber posts. A two room eastern addition has been extended to two rooms plus passage. The kitchen, with large brick double fireplace once a sperare building, is now joined to the main building.

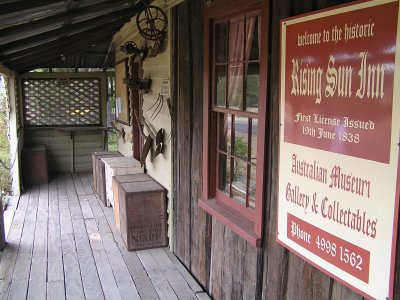
Verandah

The original hardwood slab building is said to date from 1832 and the late 19th century weatherboard additions to the rear and eastern side.

The building as had various alterations and extensions during its history. The original portion in the north west corner has original vertical slab walls and an original half round log bearer. The western wall was at some stage covered with weatherboards which have recently been removed. Internal walls in this section have been removed and the ceiling posts repositioned. Some floor boards in the original section have been replaced using boards from elsewhere in the building. The two room eastern addition was later extended to become two rooms plus passage between. The kitchen was a separate building, now joined to the main building. It has a large brick double fireplace, originally rendered.

A laundry and bathroom of vertical slab construction was added c. 1980s by the present owner. High pitched iron roof. Original shingles and battens, if any, no longer exist.

The building was being restored at the time of its heritage listing.

== Heritage listing ==
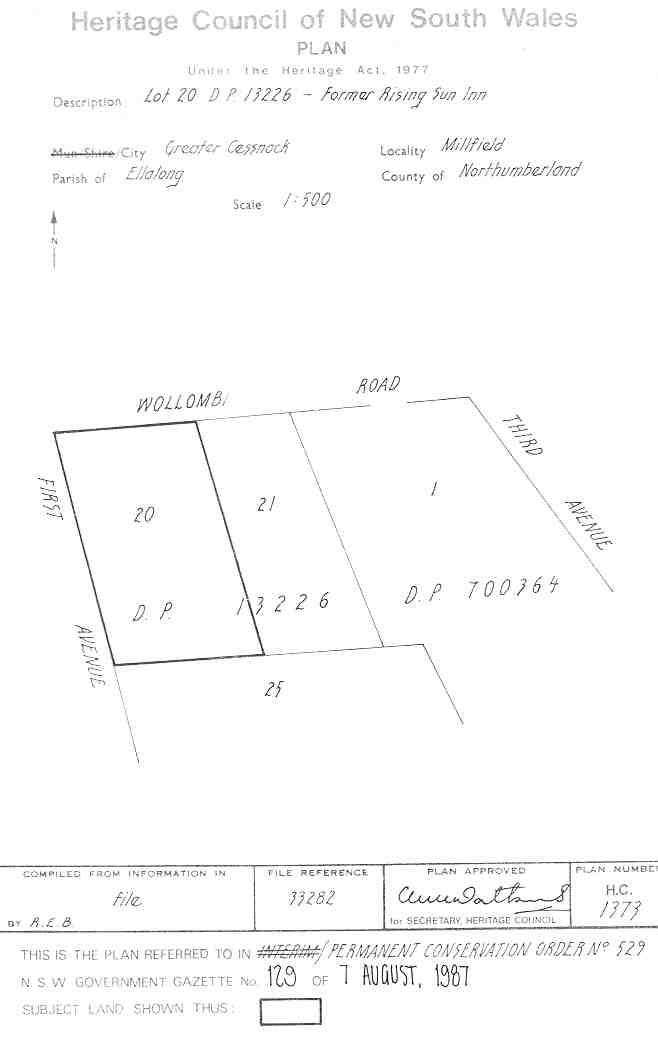
Heritage boundaries

A rare example of a vernacular slab built inn, part of which dates from the early nineteenth century, which served travellers on the Great North Road from Wollombi to Maitland. It provides evidence of the importance of the Great North Road and to the opening up of the Hunter Valley. The house dates from c. 1838 and retains fabric from that date, and from all of its later additions reflecting its varied history as an inn, general store, post office and residence. It has associations with pioneering families in the Wollombi-Maitland area and many of its licensees also held licences for other Inns in the region. It has significant scenic value, being sited on the main road at the top of a rise leading down to Wollombi Brook. One of the most important early buildings in the City of Cessnock.

Rising Sun Inn was listed on the New South Wales State Heritage Register on 2 April 1999 having satisfied the following criteria.

The place is important in demonstrating the course, or pattern, of cultural or natural history in New South Wales.

A rare example of a vernacular slab built Inn, part of which dates from the early nineteenth century, on the Great North Road from Wollombi to Maitland. It provides evidence of the importance of the Great North Road and to the opening up of the Hunter Valley. The house dated from c. 1838 and its later additions reflect its varied history as an Inn, general store, post office and residence. It has associations with pioneering families in the Wollombi-Maitland area and many of its licencees also held licences for other Inns in the region.

The place has strong or special association with a particular community or cultural group in New South Wales for social, cultural or spiritual reasons.

It has significant scenic value, being sited on the main road at the top of a rise leading down to Wollombi Brook.

The place possesses uncommon, rare or endangered aspects of the cultural or natural history of New South Wales.

A rare example of a vernacular slab built Inn.
