= Red Cedar River =

Red Cedar River may refer to the following streams in the United States:

- Red Cedar River (Michigan), a tributary of the Grand River
- Red Cedar River (Wisconsin), a tributary of the Chippewa River
- Cedar River (Iowa River tributary), also known as Red Cedar River, in Minnesota and Iowa

== See also ==
- Cedar River (disambiguation)
- Red Cedar (disambiguation)
