= Cedar Creek (Loose Creek tributary) =

Stream in the U.S. state of Missouri

Cedar Creek is a stream in Osage County in the U.S. state of Missouri. It is a tributary of Loose Creek.

The stream headwaters arise one mile southeast of Linn along the south side of US Route 50 adjacent to the Thurman L. Willett fieldhouse. The stream flows east passing under Route 50 west of Potts then turns north and northwest passing under Missouri Route 100 south of Luystown. The stream meanders to the west passing south of Frankenstein to its confluence with Loose Creek.

The source area is at 38°27′49″N 91°48′54″W at an elevation of 940 feet and the confluence is at 38°33′54″N 91°55′22″W at an elevation of 545 feet.

Cedar Creek was so named on account of cedar timber near its course.

== See also ==
- List of rivers of Missouri
