= Cedar Creek, Michigan =

Cedar Creek may refer to the following places in the U.S. state of Michigan:

- Cedar Creek Township, Muskegon County, Michigan
- Cedar Creek Township, Wexford County, Michigan
- Cedar Creek (Michigan), any of several streams throughout the state
- Cedar Creek, Barry County, Michigan, an unincorporated community in Hope Township
