= Cedar Creek Township, Indiana =

Cedar Creek Township is the name of two townships in the U.S. state of Indiana:

- Cedar Creek Township, Allen County, Indiana
- Cedar Creek Township, Lake County, Indiana

== See also ==
- Cedar Creek Township (disambiguation)
