= Cedar River (Michigan) =

Cedar River is the name of three rivers in the U.S. state of Michigan:

- Cedar River (Antrim County, Michigan), rising in Chestonia Township and flowing mostly west into the Intermediate River in Bellaire
- Cedar River (Gladwin County, Michigan), rising in northeast Clare County and northwest Gladwin County and flowing into the Tobacco River in Beaverton
- Cedar River (Menominee County, Michigan), in the northern part of Menominee County, flowing mostly south and east into the Bay of Green Bay at the town of Cedar River

== See also ==
- Cedar River, Michigan, a community in Cedarville Township, Menominee County
- Red Cedar River (Michigan), tributary of the Grand River
- Little Cedar River (Menominee River), in Menominee County
- Little Cedar River (Tobacco River), in Gladwin County
- Cedar Creek (Michigan)
- Cedar River (disambiguation)
