= Cedarbrook =

Cedarbrook may refer to:

- Cedarbrook, California
- Cedarbrook, Pennsylvania
- Cedarbrook, Philadelphia, Pennsylvania

== See also ==
- Cedar Brook (disambiguation)
