= Little Cedar River =

Little Cedar River may refer to:

- Little Cedar River (Dodge County, Minnesota), a tributary of the Cedar River entirety in Dodge County
- Little Cedar River (Iowa and Minnesota), a tributary of the Cedar River rising in Mower County, Minnesota
- Little Cedar River (Menominee River tributary), in Menominee County, Michigan
- Little Cedar River (Tobacco River tributary), in Gladwin County, Michigan

== See also ==
- Cedar River (disambiguation)
