= Congewai Creek =

Coordinates: 32°52′S 151°12′E

Congewai Creek North Arm of Wollombi Brook, Coongewai Creek, Coongeewa Creek
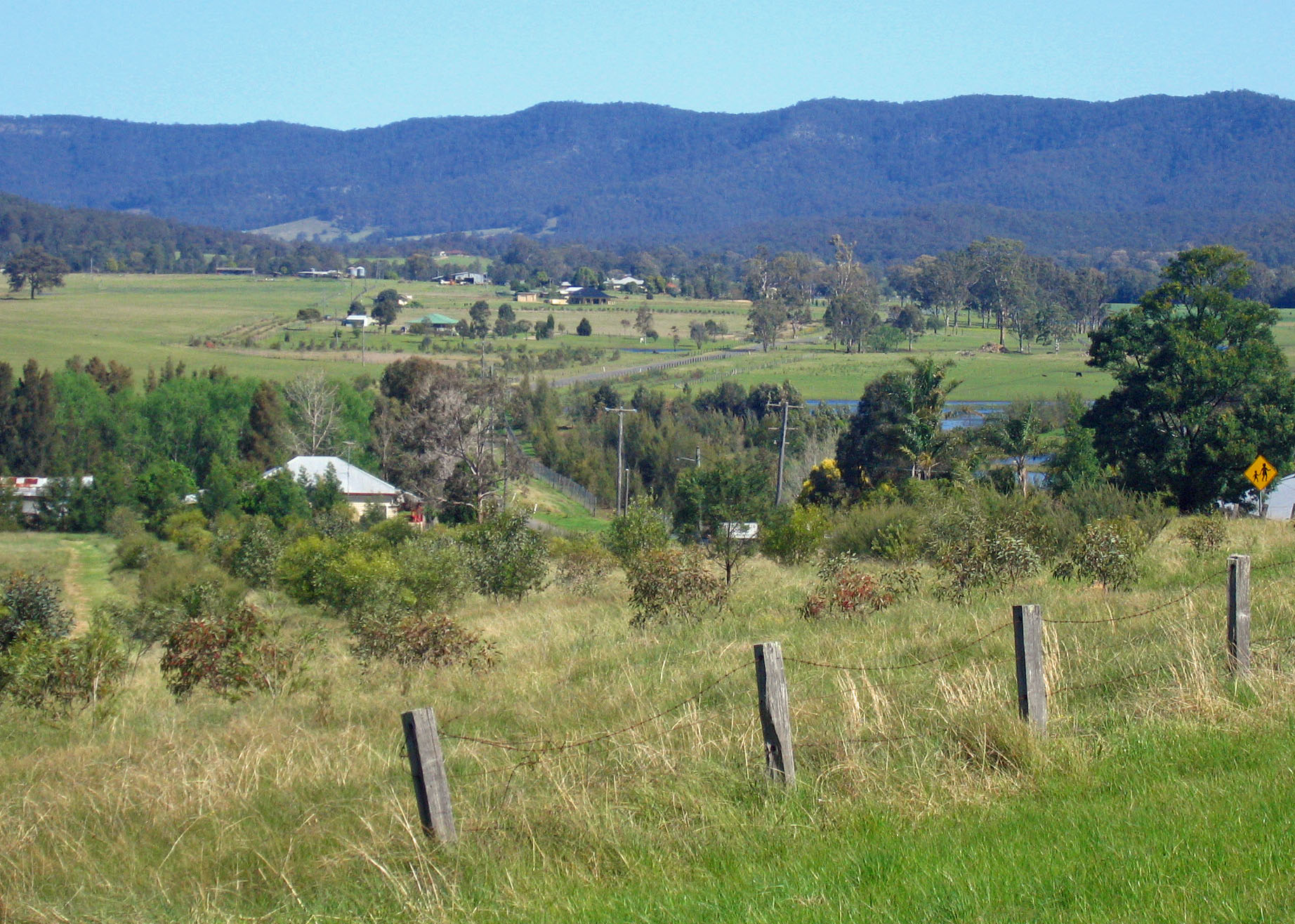
- View down Congewai Creek valley

Location
- Country: Australia
- State: New South Wales
- Region: Sydney Basin (IBRA), Upper Hunter
- Local government area: Cessnock

Physical characteristics
- Source: Myall Range
  - location: Watagans National Park
  - elevation: 199 m (653 ft)
- Mouth: confluence with Wollombi Brook
  - location: near Wollombi
  - elevation: 93 m (305 ft)
- Length: 45 km (28 mi)

Basin features
- River system: Hunter River catchment
- National park: Watagans NP

Congewai Creek, a watercourse of the Hunter River catchment, is located in the Hunter district of New South Wales, Australia.

== Course ==
The Congewai Creek rises below Myall Range, about 3 kilometres (1.9 mi) southeast of Quorrobolong trig station within the Watagans National Park. The river flows generally west by south, then north by west, then northwest by north, then west by north, then west southwest, and then south, joined by four tributaries including the Cedar Creek, before reaching its confluence with the Wollombi Brook near Wollombi. The river descends 106 metres (348 ft) over its 45 kilometres (28 mi) course.

== See also ==
- List of rivers of Australia
- List of rivers of New South Wales (A-K)
- Rivers of New South Wales
