= Cedar Creek, Nebraska =

Village in Nebraska, US

- Village
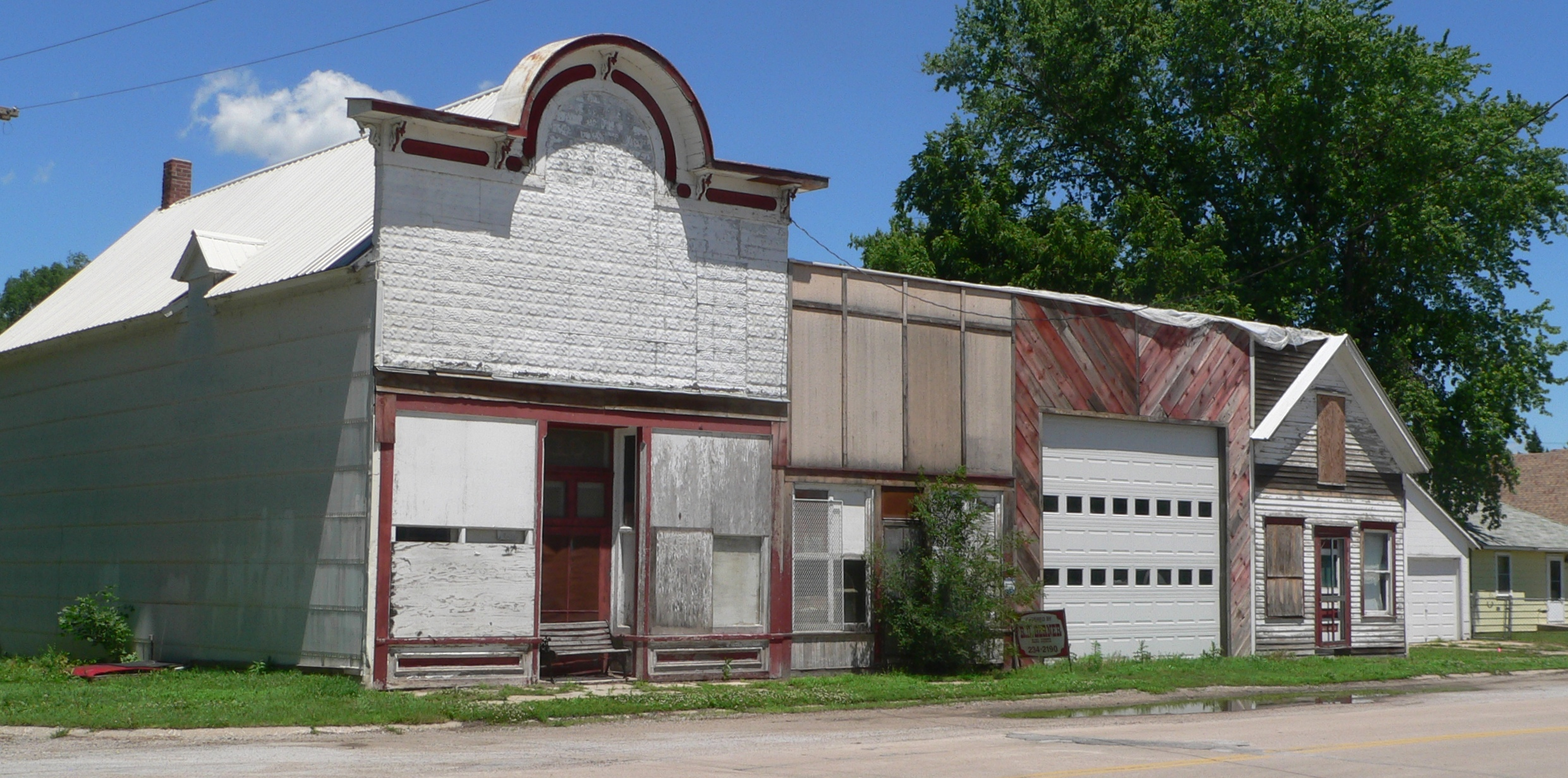
- Downtown Cedar Creek: B Street
- Motto: "The Land Of Lakes"
- Location of Cedar Creek, Nebraska
- Coordinates: 41°02′42″N 96°06′06″W
- Country: United States
- State: Nebraska
- County: Cass

Area
  - Total: 1.09 sq mi (2.82 km^{2})
  - Land: 0.57 sq mi (1.48 km^{2})
  - Water: 0.52 sq mi (1.34 km^{2})
- Elevation: 1,007 ft (307 m)

Population (2020)
  - Total: 465
  - Density: 815.0/sq mi (314.67/km^{2})
- Time zone: UTC-6 (Central (CST))
  - Summer (DST): UTC-5 (CDT)
- ZIP code: 68016
- Area code: 402
- FIPS code: 31-08185
- GNIS feature ID: 2397580
- Website: cedarcreeknebraska.com

Cedar Creek is a village in Cass County, Nebraska, United States. The population was 465 at the 2020 census.

== History ==
Cedar Creek was founded in 1865, and grew slowly until the railroad was built through the settlement in 1870. The town took its name from Cedar Creek, which flows past the town site.

== Geography ==
According to the United States Census Bureau, the village has a total area of 1.09 square miles (2.82 km^{2}), of which 0.57 square miles (1.48 km^{2}) is land and 0.52 square miles (1.35 km^{2}) is water.

== Demographics ==
Historical population
Census	Pop.	Note	%±
1970	119		—
1980	311		161.3%
1990	334		7.4%
2000	396		18.6%
2010	390		−1.5%
2020	465		19.2%
U.S. Decennial Census

=== 2010 census ===
As of the census of 2010, there were 390 people, 170 households, and 125 families living in the village. The population density was 684.2 inhabitants per square mile (264.2/km^{2}). There were 312 housing units at an average density of 547.4 per square mile (211.4/km^{2}). The racial makeup of the village was 99.5% White and 0.5% from two or more races. Hispanic or Latino of any race were 0.8% of the population.

There were 170 households, of which 25.9% had children under the age of 18 living with them, 63.5% were married couples living together, 7.6% had a female householder with no husband present, 2.4% had a male householder with no wife present, and 26.5% were non-families. 23.5% of all households were made up of individuals, and 11.1% had someone living alone who was 65 years of age or older. The average household size was 2.29 and the average family size was 2.68.

The median age in the village was 50.3 years. 20.3% of residents were under the age of 18; 4.1% were between the ages of 18 and 24; 19.7% were from 25 to 44; 30.8% were from 45 to 64; and 25.1% were 65 years of age or older. The gender makeup of the village was 48.7% male and 51.3% female.

=== 2000 census ===
As of the census of 2000, there were 396 people, 168 households, and 133 families living in the village. The population density was 566.1 inhabitants per square mile (218.6/km^{2}). There were 292 housing units at an average density of 417.5 per square mile (161.2/km^{2}). The racial makeup of the village was 98.74% White, 0.25% from other races, and 1.01% from two or more races.

There were 168 households, out of which 21.4% had children under the age of 18 living with them, 67.9% were married couples living together, 9.5% had a female householder with no husband present, and 20.8% were non-families. 16.7% of all households were made up of individuals, and 8.9% had someone living alone who was 65 years of age or older. The average household size was 2.36 and the average family size was 2.63.

In the village, the population was spread out, with 18.2% under the age of 18, 4.3% from 18 to 24, 23.0% from 25 to 44, 31.8% from 45 to 64, and 22.7% who were 65 years of age or older. The median age was 49 years. For every 100 females, there were 87.7 males. For every 100 females age 18 and over, there were 89.5 males.

As of 2000 the median income for a household in the village was $44,479, and the median income for a family was $54,063. Males had a median income of $33,750 versus $25,000 for females. The per capita income for the village was $22,030. About 5.7% of families and 5.9% of the population were below the poverty line, including 4.2% of those under age 18 and 5.1% of those age 65 or over.
