= Cedar Creek, New South Wales =

Cedar Creek Cessnock, New South Wales
- Coordinates: 32°50′16″S 151°08′08″E
- Population: 33 (2016 census)
- Postcode(s): 2325
- Time zone: AEST (UTC+10)
  - Summer (DST): AEDT (UTC+11)
- Location: 29 km (18 mi) W of Cessnock; 77 km (48 mi) W of Newcastle; 151 km (94 mi) NW of Sydney
- LGA(s): Cessnock
- Region: Hunter
- State electorate(s): Cessnock
- Federal division(s): Hunter

Cedar Creek is a small rural locality 29 kilometres (18 mi) west of Cessnock in the Hunter Region of New South Wales, Australia. In 2016 the population was 33 people and the median age was 44.

Some holiday accommodation is situated in the area for visitors to nearby vineyards.

The Cedar Creek, a perennial stream of the Hunter River catchment runs through the locality.
