= Loose Creek =

Stream in the US state of Missouri

Loose Creek is a stream in Osage County, Missouri in the United States.

The stream headwaters are at 38°28′18″N 91°53′09″W and the confluence with the Missouri River is at 38°37′09″N 91°54′31″W. The stream source area is along the northwest side of Pea Ridge southwest of Linn. The stream flows west-northwest parallel and south of U.S. Route 50 until turning sharply north and passing under Route 50 just east of the community of Loose Creek. The stream meanders northward passing under Missouri Route W and about midway between Bonnets Mill and Frankenstein. The stream flows under Route C and then veers sharply west to enter the Missouri Floodplain due east of Tebbetts on the north side of the river.

Loose Creek is a corruption of L'Ours Creek, so named for a French pioneer who settled on the creek.

== See also ==
- List of rivers of Missouri
