= Loose Creek, Missouri =

Unincorporated community in Missouri, U.S.

Coordinates: 38°30′29″N 91°57′27″W

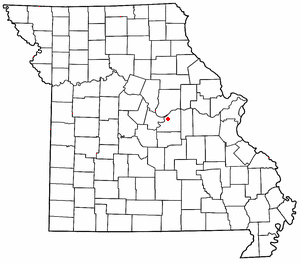

Loose Creek is an unincorporated community in Osage County, Missouri, United States. It is located north of U.S. Route 50, approximately eight miles east of Missouri's capital of Jefferson City. The ZIP Code for Loose Creek is 65054.

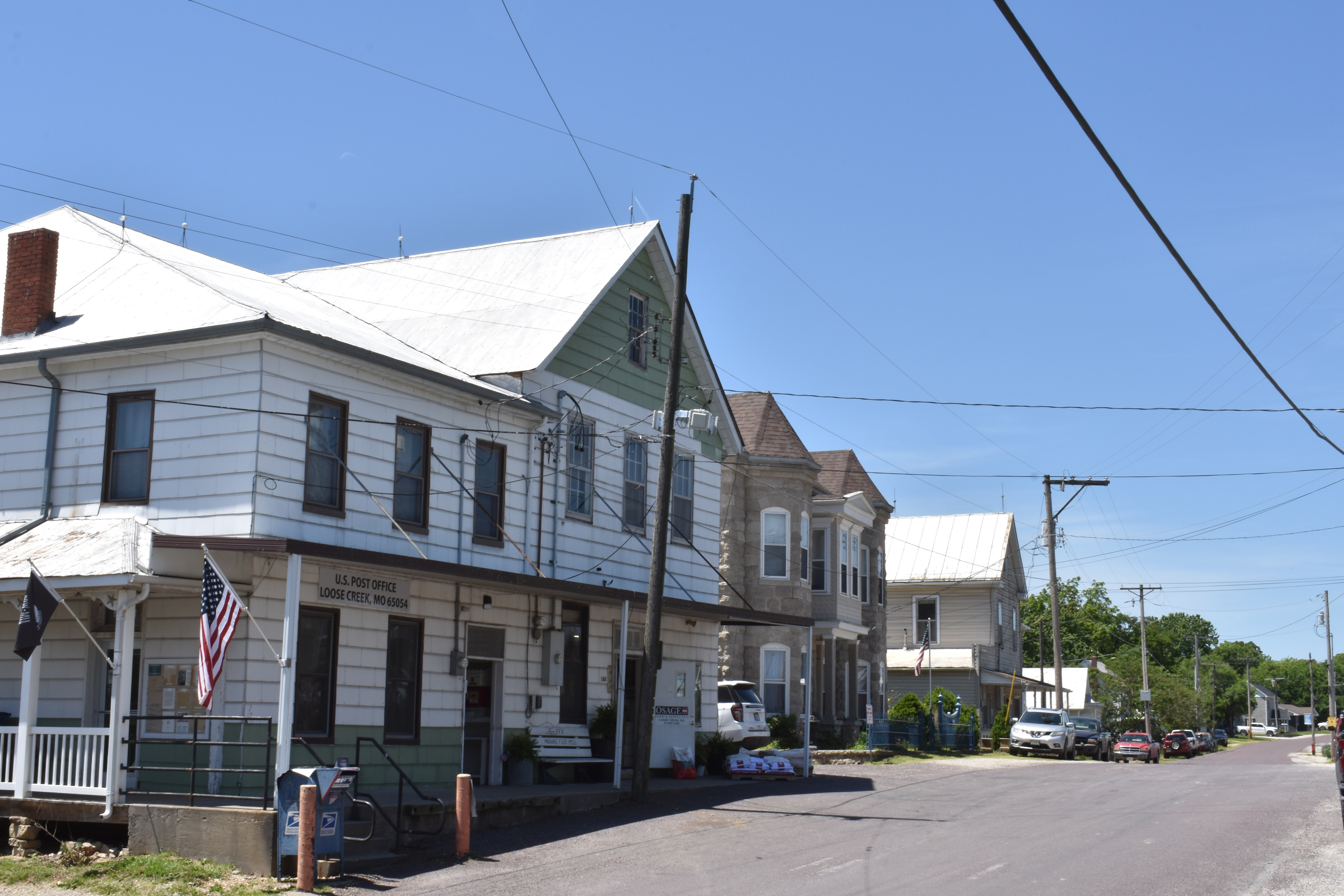
Loose Creek, Missouri's post office and surrounding buildings

A post office in Loose Creek has been in operation since 1849. The community took its name from nearby Loose Creek. The town site was platted in 1870.
