= Cedar Fork =

Cedar Fork may refer to:

- Cedar Fork (Boeuf Creek), a stream in Missouri
- Cedar Fork, Virginia, an unincorporated community
