= St John the Evangelist Church, Wollombi =

St John the Evangelist Church
- St John the Evangelist Anglican Church
- St. John's Wollombi
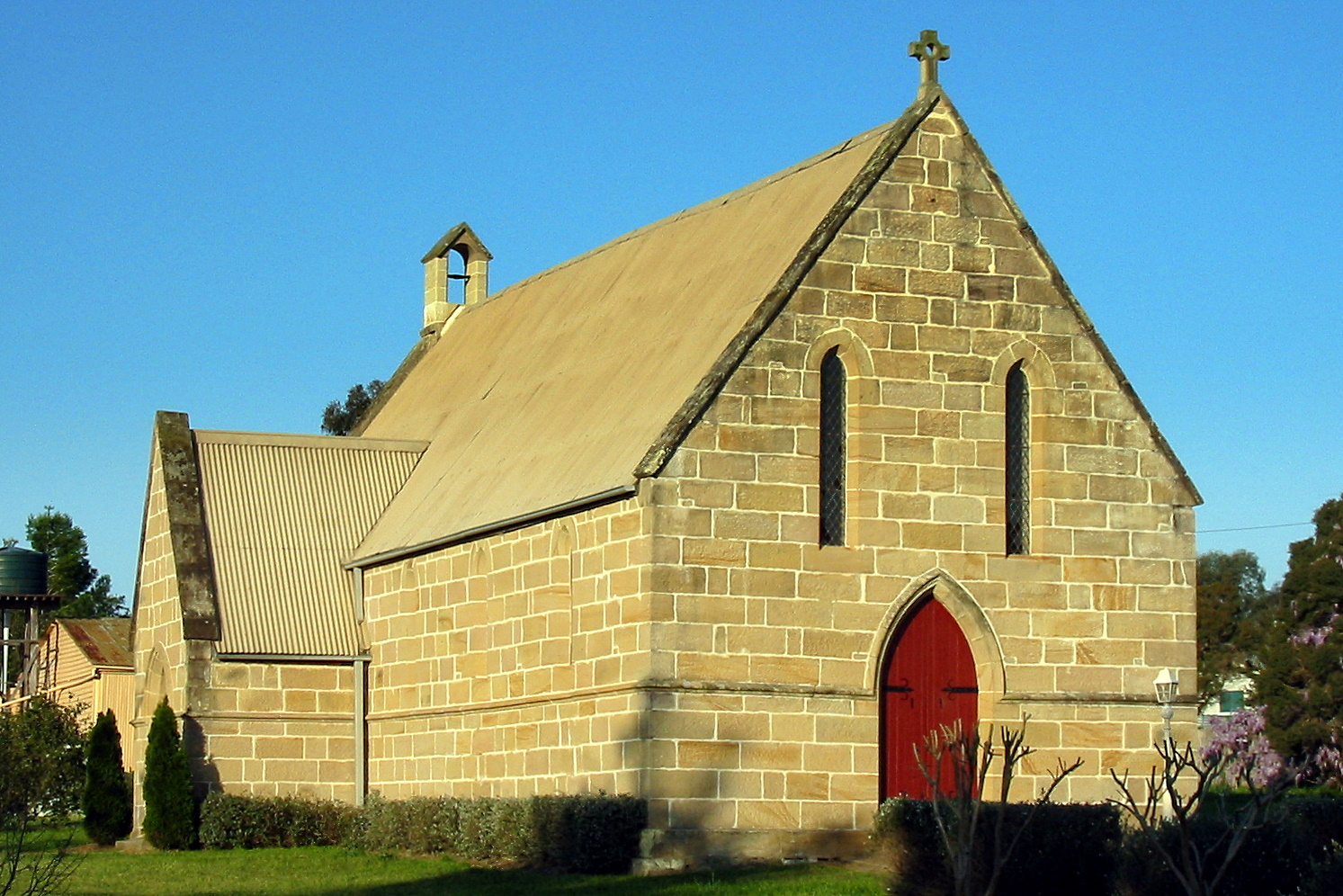
- St John's Wollombi, pictured in 2007

- Location in New South Wales
- 32°56′15″S 151°08′26″E
- Location: 2985 Paynes Crossing Road, Wollombi, City of Cessnock, New South Wales
- Country: Australia
- Denomination: Anglican Church of Australia
- Website: parishofthewollombivalley.org/stjohns.html

History
- Status: Church
- Founded: July 1846
- Founder: Most Rev. William Tyrrell
- Consecrated: 15 February 1849

Architecture
- Functional status: Active
- Architect: Edmund Blacket
- Architectural type: Church
- Style: Old Colonial Gothic Picturesque
- Years built: 1846–1864

Specifications
- Capacity: 160 worshipers
- Materials: Hawkesbury sandstone

Administration
- Diocese: Newcastle
- Parish: Wollombi Valley

New South Wales Heritage Database (Local Government Register)
- Official name: St John The Evangelist Anglican Church
- Type: New South Wales Heritage Database entry
- Reference no.: 1340099
- Site type: Church
- Category: Religion

St John the Evangelist Church is a heritage-listed Anglican church at 2985 Paynes Crossing Road, Wollombi, City of Cessnock, New South Wales, Australia. It was designed by Edmund Blacket and built from 1846 to 1864.

== History ==
In May 1845, district residents met to plan for the construction of a protestant episcopalian church. By 1846, the architect had been selected, the site granted by the government and tenders called for the stone and woodwork. The church was designed by Edmund Blacket who had arrived in the colony in 1842. This was one of his early buildings. The foundation stone was laid in July 1846, and the church consecrated on 15 February 1849, by the Bishop of Newcastle, the Rt Rev. William Tyrrell. The nave was lengthened by 6.1 metres (20 ft) between 1862 and 1864. The extensions were designed and supervised by Blacket.

Anglican Diocese 1920 photo states "Erected 1847 - ..added 1864 - seat 160".

== Description ==
St John the Evangelist Church is a simple village church completed in the Old Colonial Gothic Picturesque style; in a rectangular plan with projecting porch; vestry and chancel lit by single lancet windows. The gable is ornamented by a small belfry at one end and stone cross at the other. Built of local sandstone of a variegated golden colour. The church has a simple pitched iron roof with internal fittings and pews of the finest cedar. The church is approached through a characteristic picket fence under a fine wrought iron lantern.

See also Anglican Diocese 1920 Plans on "Images" page.

=== Condition ===
As at 3 August 2002, the church was in original condition. The building remains predominantly intact (inclusive of modifications like the nave extension, organ and repairs). Its integrity is very high given its state of conservation, completeness of context and original building.

=== Modifications and dates ===
- 1864 - Nave lengthened.

== Significance ==
As at 3 September 2013, this church was very well conserved and picturesque in the valley landscape. It is historically significant because it demonstrates the prosperity and expectation of the time. It is also historically significant because it is an example of Edmund Blacket's early work in NSW. It is aesthetically significant because of its design, setting and the use of local stone. It is socially significant because of its demonstrated value both spiritually and socially to parishes of the 1840s to this day. It is significant for research purposes because it is an early Blacket church and because of its 1949 flood marker. Its intactness and high integrity makes it at least of high local significance and possibly of state significance.

The place is important in demonstrating the course, or pattern, of cultural or natural history in New South Wales.

The item is historically significant because of the period in which it was built when the importance and future prosperity of Wollombi was linked to the Great North Road and Governance of the district.

The place has a strong or special association with a person, or group of persons, of importance of cultural or natural history of New South Wales's history.

This item is historically significant by its association with architect Edmund Blacket and the fact the church is one of his early commission in NSW.

The place is important in demonstrating aesthetic characteristics and/or a high degree of creative or technical achievement in New South Wales.

The item is aesthetically significant because of its design, use of local materials and landscape context.

The place is ihas strong or special association with a particular community or cultural group in New South Wales for social, cultural or spiritual reasons.

The item is socially significant because it demonstrates its value to its parishioners of yesterday and today for spiritual and social support and reflects the ?? And expectations of the community in the 1840s.

The place has potential to yield information that will contribute to an understanding of the cultural or natural history of New South Wales.

The item provides the opportunity for research because it is an early work of Edmund Blacket and because it is a depth marker of the 1949 flood level (which has been used in assessing development applications before Council).

The place is important in demonstrating the principal characteristics of a class of cultural or natural places/environments in New South Wales.

The item is representative of Blackets early work and representative of local parishes churches in early 19th Century townships.

== See also ==
- Australian non-residential architectural styles
- List of Anglican churches in New South Wales
