= Frankenstein, Missouri =

Unincorporated community in Missouri, United States

Coordinates: 38°34′27″N 91°52′57″W

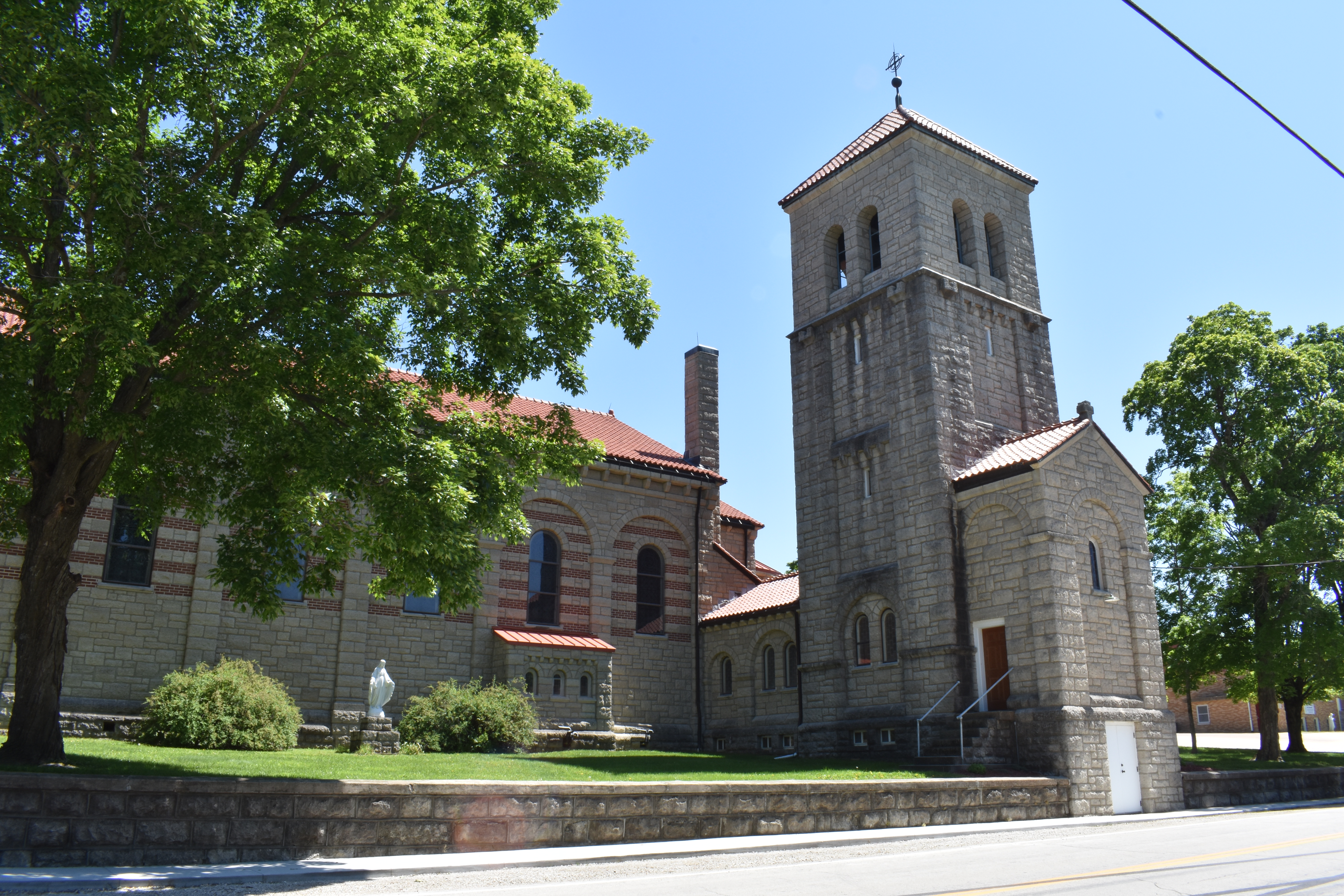
Our Lady Help of Christians in Frankenstein.

Frankenstein is an unincorporated community in northwestern Osage County, Missouri, United States. It is located approximately 20 km (12 mi) east of Jefferson City. Frankenstein is located on Missouri Route C, about midway between Luystown to the east and Bonnots Mill to the west. Cedar Creek flows past, about one mile south of the site.

A post office called Frankenstein was established in 1893, and remained in operation until 1921. The community most likely derives its name from Godfried Franken (another source says Gottfried Franken), a pioneer citizen said to have donated land to the town in 1890. The donated tract became known as Franken Hill; and, since "Stein" can mean "rock," the town name may have been a fancy way of honoring Mr. Franken for his donated stein (hill).
