= Cedar Creek (Bourbon County, Kansas) =

Stream in the US state of Kansas

Coordinates: 37°49′04″N 94°47′32″W

Cedar Creek is a stream in Bourbon County, Kansas, in the United States. It is a tributary of the Marmaton River.

Cedar Creek was named from the groves of red cedar in the area.

== See also ==
- List of rivers of Kansas
