= Millfield, New South Wales =

Millfield
- Town
- Coordinates: 32°52′54″S 151°16′04″E
- Country: Australia
- State: New South Wales
- City: Cessnock
- LGA: City of Cessnock
- Location: 12 km (7.5 mi) SW of Cessnock
- Established: 1830s

Government
  - State electorate: Cessnock
  - Federal division: Hunter

Population
  - Total: 1,282 (2021 census)
- Postcode: 2325
- County: Northumberland County

Millfield is a town in the City of Cessnock municipality of New South Wales. Millfield is located in the County of Northumberland.

It had a population of 1,282 as of the 2021 census.

Millfield contains a general store and the historic Rising Sun Inn, which now operates as a museum.

Millfield Public School opened in 1868. The school had an enrolment of 62 students in 2015. A second school in Millfield, Crawfordville Public School, operated from 1929 to 1970.

Millfield Post Office opened in 1854.

Saint Luke's Anglican Church was built in 1880. It was flagged for potential closure and sale in June 2018 as part of a diocese plan to raise funds for redress of survivors of child sexual abuse, with services to be consolidated with Saint John's Church in Cessnock. The church had absorbed the congregation of Saint Thomas's at Ellalong when that church closed in 2014.

Millfield Cemetery, located in Hayes Road, is managed by the Cessnock City Council.

In the vicinity are a number of coal mines on the South Maitland coalfields, extracting from the Greta coal measures. These include Stanford Merthyr No. 2 at Paxton (operating since 1922), and on the road north-east towards Pelton, the Millfield Greta Colliery (operating since 1924) and then the Greta Main/Maitland Main Colliery (operating since 1921). The Millfield Greta mine encountered an issue in 1930 when the coal seam went out of aligning, which takes time and expense to undertake the engineering work so to continue following the seam. By mid-1931, the mine employed more miners, with a total of 24 pairs of miners, and total workers at 70. In 1942 there were 160 mineworkers employed, and the mine was producing 600 tons a day. In 1953, colliery management terminated over 100 miners as a result of falling production of gas coal.

In the mid-1950s, the Millfield Sports Club would hold a sports meeting followed by a dance.

A new 100-lot residential development, the Rosehill Estate, was released for sale in May 2017. The development was controversial: the original plan for 700 houses did not go ahead, and 500 residents signed a petition against the revised plan on the grounds of overdevelopment of the historic village; however, the rezoning was approved in 2014, with a subsequent council rescission motion lost by one vote. A further 222-block development is proposed off Mount View Road. This has also been the source of controversy, as residents have protested that it could almost double the population of the village.

== Heritage listings ==
Millfield has a number of heritage-listed sites, including:

- 95–97 Wollombi Road: Rising Sun Inn
- 15–29 Bennett Street, Crawfordville School
