= Cedar Creek (New South Wales) =

Coordinates: 32°52′S 151°12′E

Location
- Country: Australia
- State: New South Wales
- Region: Sydney Basin (IBRA), Upper Hunter
- Local government area: Mid-Coast Council

Physical characteristics
- Source: Pokolbin State Forest
  - location: near Mount View
- Mouth: confluence with Congewai Creek
  - location: west of Cessnock
- Length: 38 km (24 mi)

Basin features
- River system: Hunter River catchment

Cedar Creek, a perennial stream of the Hunter River catchment, is located in the Hunter district of New South Wales, Australia.

== Course ==
The Cedar Creek rises in Pokolbin State Forest about 2 kilometres (1.2 mi) north of Mount View, west of Cessnock, and flows generally south, then west, and then south-southeast and south, before reaching its confluence with the Congewai Creek adjacent to the Wollombi-Cessnock Road, over its 16 kilometres (9.9 mi) course.

== See also ==
- List of rivers of Australia
- List of rivers of New South Wales (A-K)
- Rivers of New South Wales
