= Red Cedar =

Red Cedar may refer to:

== Trees ==
- Toona ciliata, a tree in the mahogany family native to Asia and Australia
- Toona sureni, a tree in the mahogany family native from South Asia to Papua New Guinea
- Juniperus virginiana, an eastern North American juniper
- Juniperus procera, an East African juniper
- Thuja plicata, a western North American tree in the cypress family

== Places ==
Canada

- Red Cedar Lake (Ontario), a lake in the Temagami region

United States

- Red Cedar, Wisconsin, a town in Dunn County
- Red Cedar (community), Wisconsin, an unincorporated community in Dunn County
- Red Cedar Lake (Wisconsin)
- Red Cedar River (Michigan), a tributary of the Grand River
- Red Cedar River (Wisconsin), a tributary of the Chippewa River
- Cedar River (Iowa River), also known as Red Cedar River, in Minnesota and Iowa

== Other uses ==
- The Red Cedar, an unrecognized humanitarian protection emblem proposed by Lebanon
