= Cedar Run =

Cedar Run may refer to the following:

- Cedar Run (Missouri), a tributary of the Big River
- Cedar Run, Pennsylvania, an unincorporated community in Lycoming County
- Cedar Run (Pennsylvania), a tributary of Pine Creek
- Cedar Run (Occoquan River), in Virginia, a tributary of the Occoquan River
- Cedar Run, New Jersey, an unincorporated community in Ocean County
- Cedar Run, Michigan, an unincorporated community in Michigan
