= Cedar River =

Cedar River may refer to:

== Canada ==
- Cedar River (Ontario), a tributary of the English River

== United States ==
- Cedar River (Iowa River tributary), in Minnesota and Iowa, a tributary of the Iowa River
- Cedar River (Antrim County, Michigan)
- Cedar River (Gladwin County, Michigan)
- Cedar River (Menominee County, Michigan)
- Cedar River (New York), a tributary of the Hudson River
- Cedar River (Washington), a tributary of Lake Washington
- Cedar River (Willapa Bay), Washington
- Cedar Creek (North Dakota), also known as Cedar River

== See also ==
- Cedar (disambiguation)
- Cedar Creek (disambiguation)
- Little Cedar River (disambiguation)
- Red Cedar River (disambiguation)
