= Cedar Brook (disambiguation) =

Cedar Brook may refer to the following in the U.S. state of New Jersey:

- Cedar Brook, a tributary of Cranbury Brook in Middlesex County
- Cedar Brook, New Jersey, an unincorporated area in Camden County
- Cedar Brook Park, New Jersey

== See also ==
- Cedarbrook (disambiguation)
