= Cedar Creek (Salt Creek tributary) =

Stream in Ralls County, Missouri, U.S.

Coordinates: 39.6055986°N 91.5721007°W

Cedar Creek is a stream in Ralls County in the U.S. state of Missouri. It is a tributary of the Salt River.

Cedar Creek was so named on account of cedar trees near its course.

== See also ==
- List of rivers of Missouri
