= Cedar Creek (Mississippi River tributary) =

Stream in Winona County, Minnesota, U.S.

Coordinates: 44°00′35″N 91°29′43″W

Cedar Creek is a stream in Winona County, in the U.S. state of Minnesota. It is a tributary of the Mississippi River.

Cedar Creek was named for the red cedar trees near the stream.

== See also ==
- List of rivers of Minnesota
