= Cedar Creek (Shoal Creek tributary) =

Stream in the U.S. state of Missouri

Coordinates: 36°58′06″N 94°25′06″W

Cedar Creek is a stream in Newton County in the U.S. state of Missouri. It is a tributary of Shoal Creek.

The stream headwaters arise at at an elevation of 1150 feet and two miles west of the community of Fredville. The stream flows generally north-northwest for about two miles passing about one mile east of Spurgeon before turning to the northeast. It continues to its confluence with Shoal Creek about one half mile southeast of Tipton Ford after passing under U.S. Route 71. The confluence is at at an elevation of 938 feet.

Cedar Creek was so named due to the cedar timber near its banks.

== See also ==
- List of rivers of Missouri
