= Cedar Creek (Henry County, Missouri) =

Stream in the American state of Missouri

Coordinates: 38.2675241°N 93.5899311°W

Cedar Creek is a stream in Henry County in the U.S. state of Missouri.

Cedar Creek was so named on account of cedar timber lining its course.

== See also ==
- List of rivers of Missouri
