= Cedar Branch =

Stream in Gasconade County, Missouri, U.S.

Coordinates: 38.4067125°N 91.5990526°W

Cedar Branch is a stream in Gasconade County in the U.S. state of Missouri. It is a tributary of Third Creek.

Cedar Branch (historically called "Cedar Fork") was named for the cedar timber lining its course.

== See also ==
- List of rivers of Missouri
