= Wollombi =

- Town
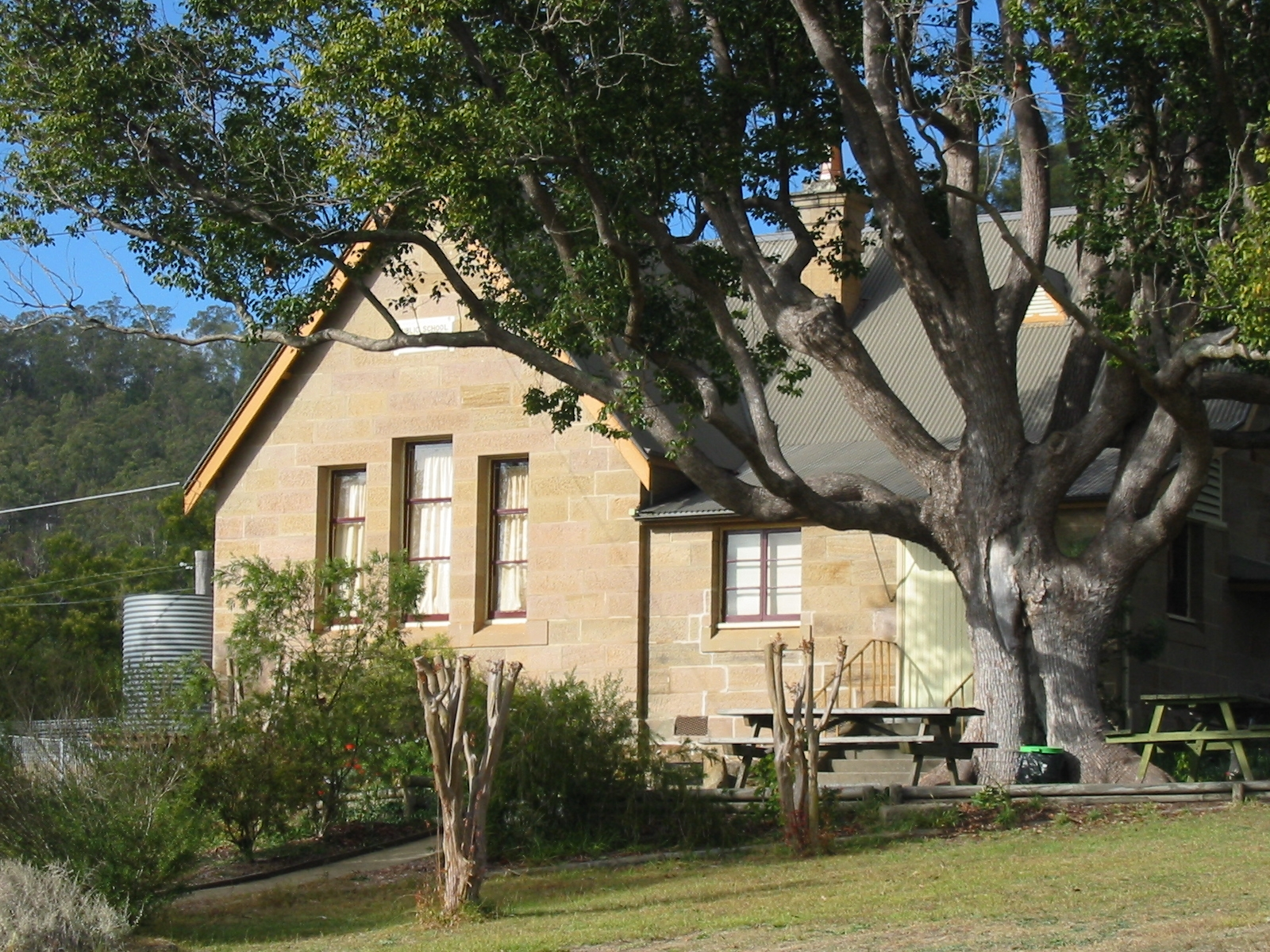
- Wollombi Public School

- Coordinates: 32°55′54″S 151°08′04″E
- Country: Australia
- State: New South Wales
- Region: Hunter
- City: Cessnock
- LGA: Cessnock City Council
- Location: 128 km (80 mi) N of Sydney; 80 km (50 mi) W of Newcastle; 29 km (18 mi) SW of Cessnock

Government
  - State electorate: Cessnock
  - Federal division: Hunter
- Elevation: 80 m (260 ft)

Population
  - Total: 301 (2021 census)
- Time zone: UTC+10 (AEST)
  - Summer (DST): UTC+11 (AEDT)
- Postcode: 2325
- County: Northumberland
- Parish: Corrabare
- Mean max temp: 30.2 °C (86.4 °F)
- Mean min temp: 4.2 °C (39.6 °F)
- Annual rainfall: 747.9 mm (29.44 in)

Wollombi (/wɒlʌmˈbaɪ/ wo-lum-BYE) is a small village in the Hunter Region of New South Wales, Australia. It is within the Cessnock City Council LGA, situated 29 kilometres (18 mi) southwest of Cessnock and 128 km (80 mi) north of Sydney. To the south is the village of Laguna, to the east, the village of Millfield and to the north, the village of Broke. At the 2021 census, Wollombi had a population of 301.

The valley is bordered to the west by the World Heritage listed Yengo National Park (and Yengo State Forest) and the main road, the convict-built Great North Road (GNR) forms one of the major legs of the Greater Blue Mountains Drive. To the east lie Watagans National Park along with Corrabare and Olney State Forests.

Wollombi's modest modern size is offset by its 19th-century sandstone buildings and timber slab constructed cottages and sheds in a narrow valley junction containing Wollombi Brook and Congewai Creek. Narone and Yango Creeks also join these waterways near the village.

The area is home to an abundance of native birds, reptiles and other animals including kangaroos, wallabies, wallaroos and wombats and is surrounded by imposing tree-lined mountains.

== History ==
=== Indigenous history ===
The traditional custodians of the locality are believed to be the Darkinjung people, though the Awabakal and Wonnarua nations are also mentioned.

The town's name is an Aboriginal term said to mean 'meeting place of the waters' or simply 'meeting place' ("Derived from Awabakal Aboriginal term for 'meeting of waters', but this cannot be linguistically verified. (Appleton; 1992). Also: meeting of the waters. (McCarthy; 1963)."). It was apparently pronounced 'Wu-lum-bee', though today it is pronounced Wo (as in wok) - lum (as in thumb) - bi (as in buy).

There is a vast number of historic Aboriginal sites in the surrounding countryside which is thought to have been used as a ceremonial meeting place as people from hundreds of kilometres visited the area and made their way to Mount Yengo - a place of great significance throughout the ancient nations of eastern Australia.

There are rock engravings, sharpening grooves, hand stencils, tribal markings and other images in caves and outcrops, frequent evidence of camping sites along the Brook and its tributary creeks, and two major mapping sites containing many engravings.

=== European history ===
The establishment, development and significance of the township of Wollombi was directly connected with the construction and importance of the Great Northern Road in the early 19th century. The Howes Valley Rd (Putty Road) was completed in 1823, but travel along it was thought to be too difficult to be a success commercially.

Major Thomas Mitchell - Surveyor-General - formulated the idea of an inland route to open up transport to regions in northern NSW. Heneage Finch, who later settled in Laguna, surveyed the route for the Great Northern Road via Castle Hill, Wisemans Ferry, St Albans, Laguna and Wollombi.

At Wollombi, the road diverged toward Singleton and Muswellbrook to the north, and Cessnock and Maitland to the north east.

Hundreds of convicts began building the road from Castle Hill to Wollombi. One group was headquartered at Castle Hill where over 380 men were organised in seven road parties. They began work on the section of road south of the Hawkesbury. A second group, of 119 men, worked from Newcastle in two road parties, one between Newcastle and Wallis Plains (Maitland) and the other between Wallis Plains and Wollombi.

Road construction commenced in 1826 and was completed in 1831. Remnants such as stone culverts, bridges and retaining walls remain, particularly in the area between Wisemans Ferry and Wollombi, and are catalogued and cared for by The Convict Trail Project.

During the years before the GNR was commenced, only a few large land grants (1,000–2,000 acres (405–809 ha)) were allocated along Cockfighter's Creek or the lower Wollombi Brook, to John Blaxland and - Rodd at Fordwich, Heneage Finch at Laguna and Thomas Crawford at Congewai. Richard Wiseman received 640 acres (259 ha) near Wollombi. After 1830 the holdings in the Wollombi Valley were about 100 acres (40 ha).

Surveyor GB White surveyed the village reserve at Wollombi into sections and allotments in 1833.

A horseman who travelled from Sydney to Patrick's Plains in 1827 along the line of road in progress took three days for the journey – the first day to Wiseman's Ferry - 49 miles (79 km). The second day to 'the head of the Wollombi' (about 12 mi (19 km) south of the future Wollombi village reserve) - 40 mi (64 km), and the third day to Patrick's Plains - 36 mi (58 km), made a total of 125 mi (201 km).

The settlement developed as a centre for the farming community and for travellers on the Great North Road. Then, on 12 June 1831, the steamship 'Sophie Jane' sailed from Sydney to the port of Morpeth on the Hunter River in eleven and a half hours. With the speed and carrying capacity of the ship far surpassing that of road transport to the Hunter region, the commercial significance of the Great Northern Road immediately diminished.

By the early 1840s, the inns operating at intervals along the Great North Road and its branch toward Maitland were (Solomon) Wiseman's at the Ferry, (Richard) Wiseman's Inn at the head of the Wollombi Valley (from 1827), Traveller's Test at Laguna (1835), Governor Gipps at Wollombi (1840), Rising Sun at Millfield (1840s) and the Cock Inn on Cockfighter Creek (c1840s).

The foundation stone of gothic style Saint Michael's Catholic Church was laid near the Congewai Creek crossing (Cunneens Bridge) in 1840 but the church was moved to its present location following severe damage in the 1893 flood. St John's Anglican Church was built in 1849. The Wollombi Telegraph Office opened in 1860, the former Police station and Courthouse (now Endeavour Museum) was built c1866, the stone School building c1881 (the original school opened in 1852) and the timber General Store is well over a century old.

By 1850 the village had an Anglican and Catholic Church, a flour mill, a village cemetery and its own District Council. By 1851 the population was recorded as 105. By 1862 there were 1655 people living in the district with 233 in the village itself and by 1867 there were 1800 people in the area.

The 1860s were the years of greatest development. The production figures for 1867 were 26,856 bushels of wheat, 23,042 bushels of maize, 398 of barley, 680 of oats, 88 tons of potatoes, 7,502 lbs of tobacco and 180 gallons of wine. The livestock numbers in the valley were as follows: 5,853 head of cattle, 3,543 sheep and 1,449 pigs.

Rust devastated the area in the 1870s causing wheat crop failures. This undermined the economic base of the region and along with overfarming of the land causing a loss of productivity and severe floods removing topsoil, the district entered a period of decline which continues to the present time.

By 1911 the population of the village had reached a high of 406 but it had declined to 151 in 1961. In the 2021 census, the population of Wollombi was 301, consisting of 153 male and 148 female residents. The median age is 55.

Wollombi Public School was closed at the end of 2014, despite a long-running campaign by parents to keep the school operating.

== Saint Michael the Archangel ==
It is a Gothic-style Catholic church made out of sandstone opened on 30 September 1840. It is located between the Old Post Office and the Forge. Australia's first Catholic bishop and the first Archbishop of Sydney Rev John Bede Polding rode into Wollombi on horseback to lay the first foundation stone. Polding bought the stone for 5 pounds near Cunnenn's Bridge on the Wollombi Brook with mass beginning in 1843.

It was heavily damaged by flooding in 1893. The new foundation stone was laid by Reverend James Murray on 22 October 1893. The 1840 foundation began the church western wall. The cost of the removal and reconstruction was 850 pounds. The 1893 restoration was completed by architect Frederick Menekens.

The church was damaged by the Newcastle Earthquake In 1991 the church was put off auction which the community bought back for $120,000 with pews purchased for $3,400 returned to the community. Australian Catholic Historical Society gifted the Friends of St Michaels was gifted a portrait of John Bede Polding in 1992. On 3 October 1999 Rev Michael Malone reopended the church to mass. The friends of St Michaels was formed as the official of the church with appointed trustees. Government -assisted grants enabled the Friends of St Michael to begin renovations. In 2005 local artist Margaret Ella was commissioned to design and craft a series of windows based on Creation as described in the Book of Genesis. Australian Catholic University commissioned a book about the church by Alison Plummer was published in 2019.

== Heritage listings ==
Wollombi has a number of heritage-listed sites, including:

- Great North Road (Mount Manning to Wollombi Section)
- St John the Evangelist Church
- Wollombi Endeavour Museum (former court house)
- Wollombi Tavern

== Gallery ==
Images of Wollombi
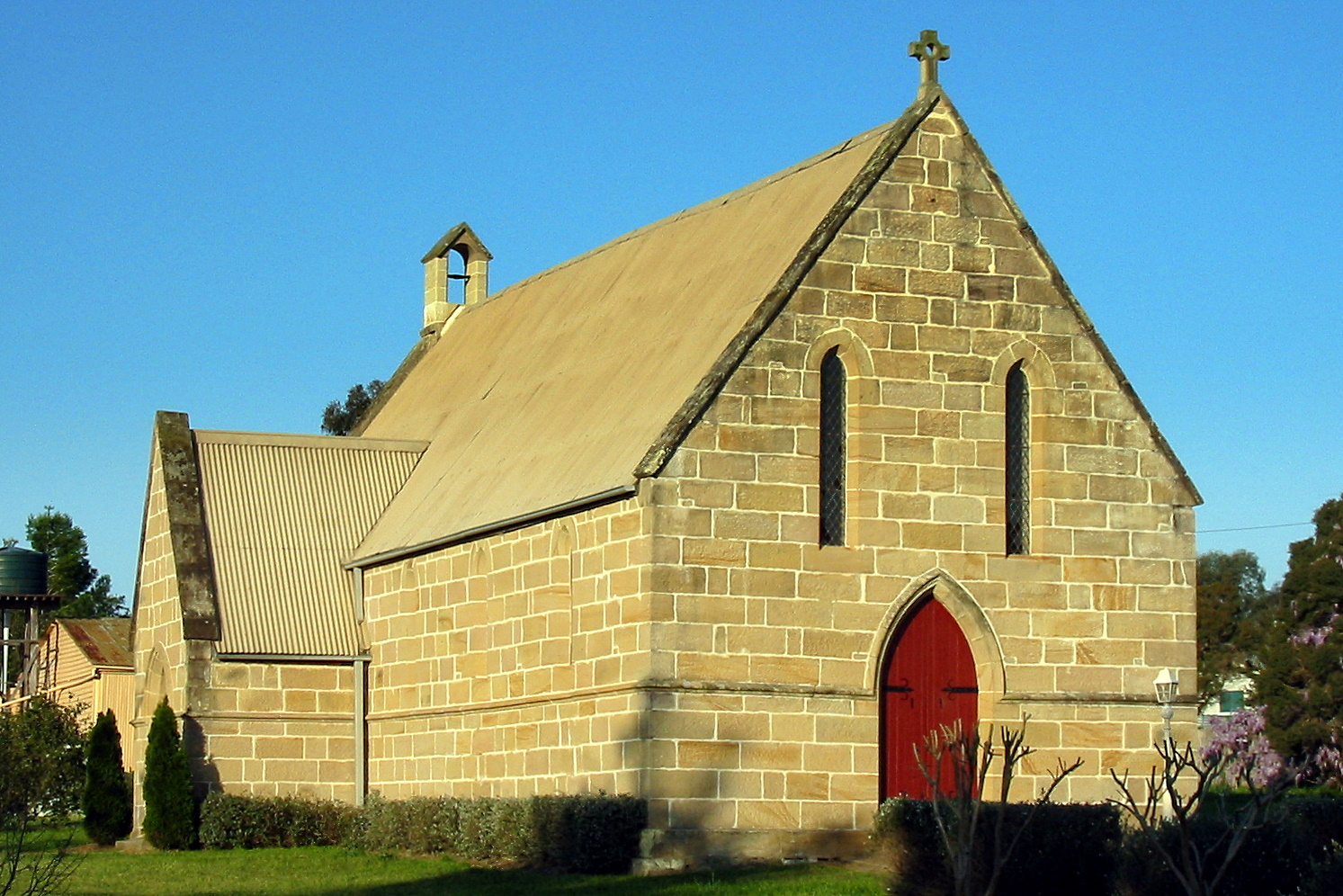
St John the Evangelist Church

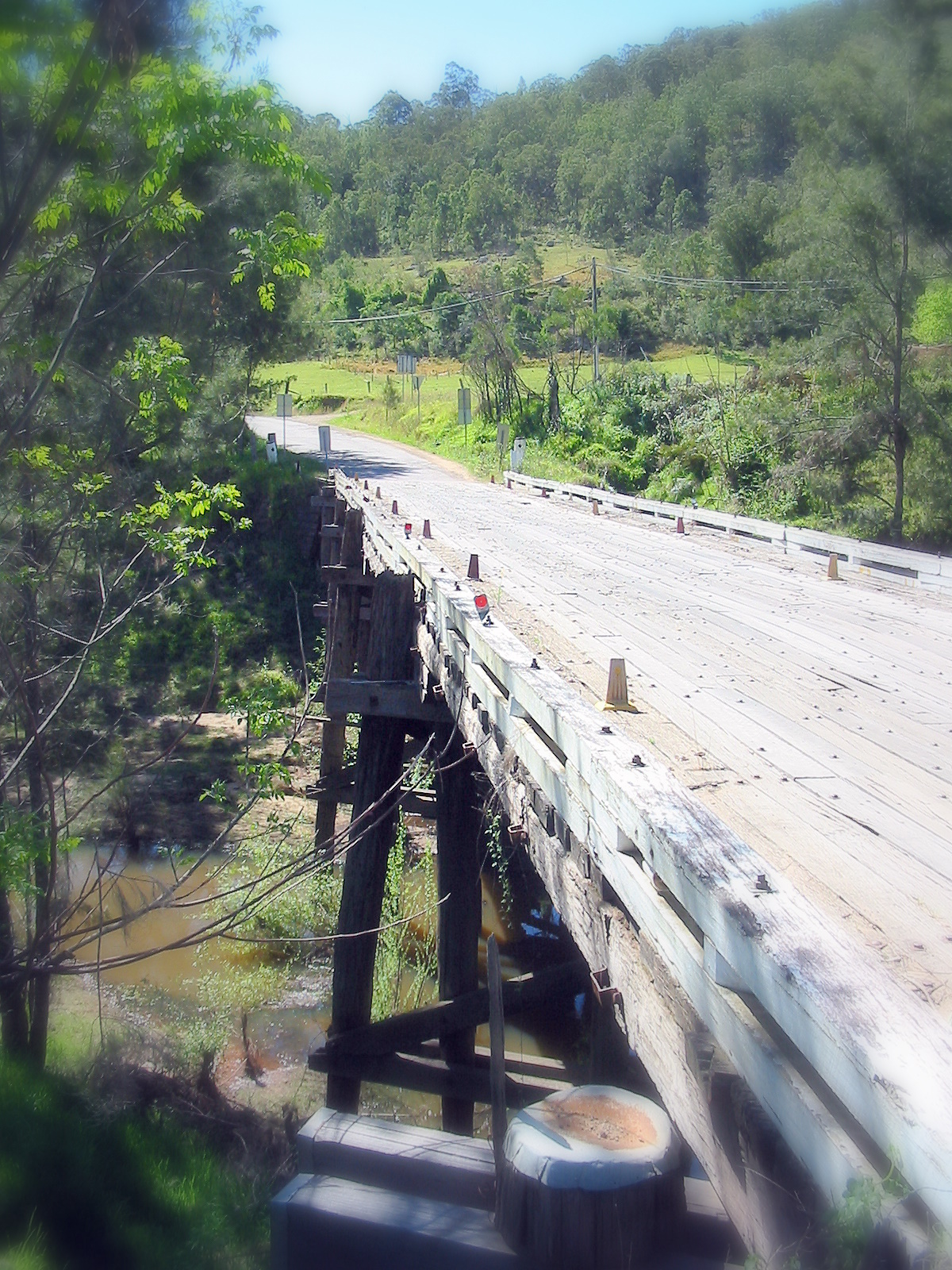
Cunneens Bridge

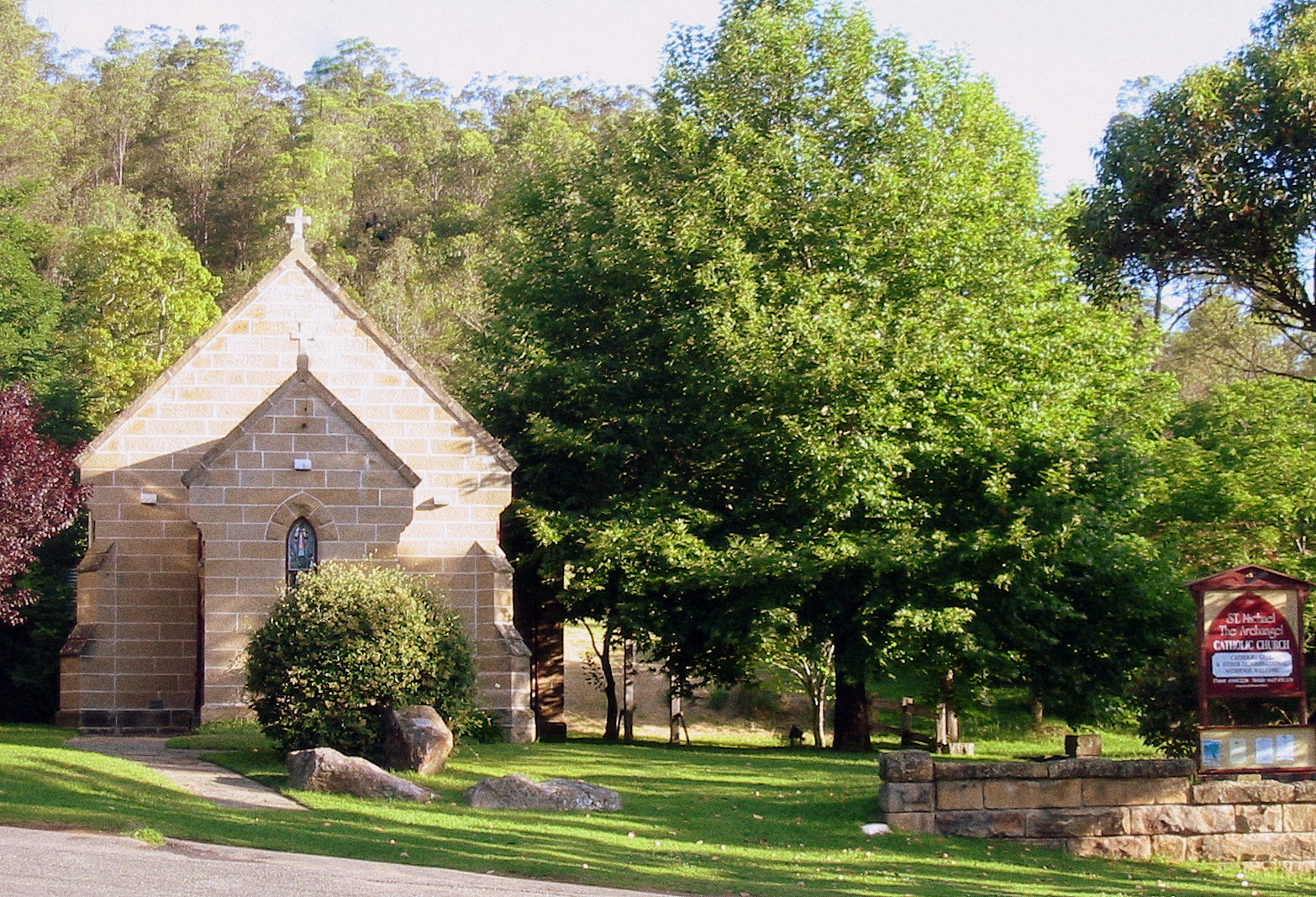
Saint Michael's Church

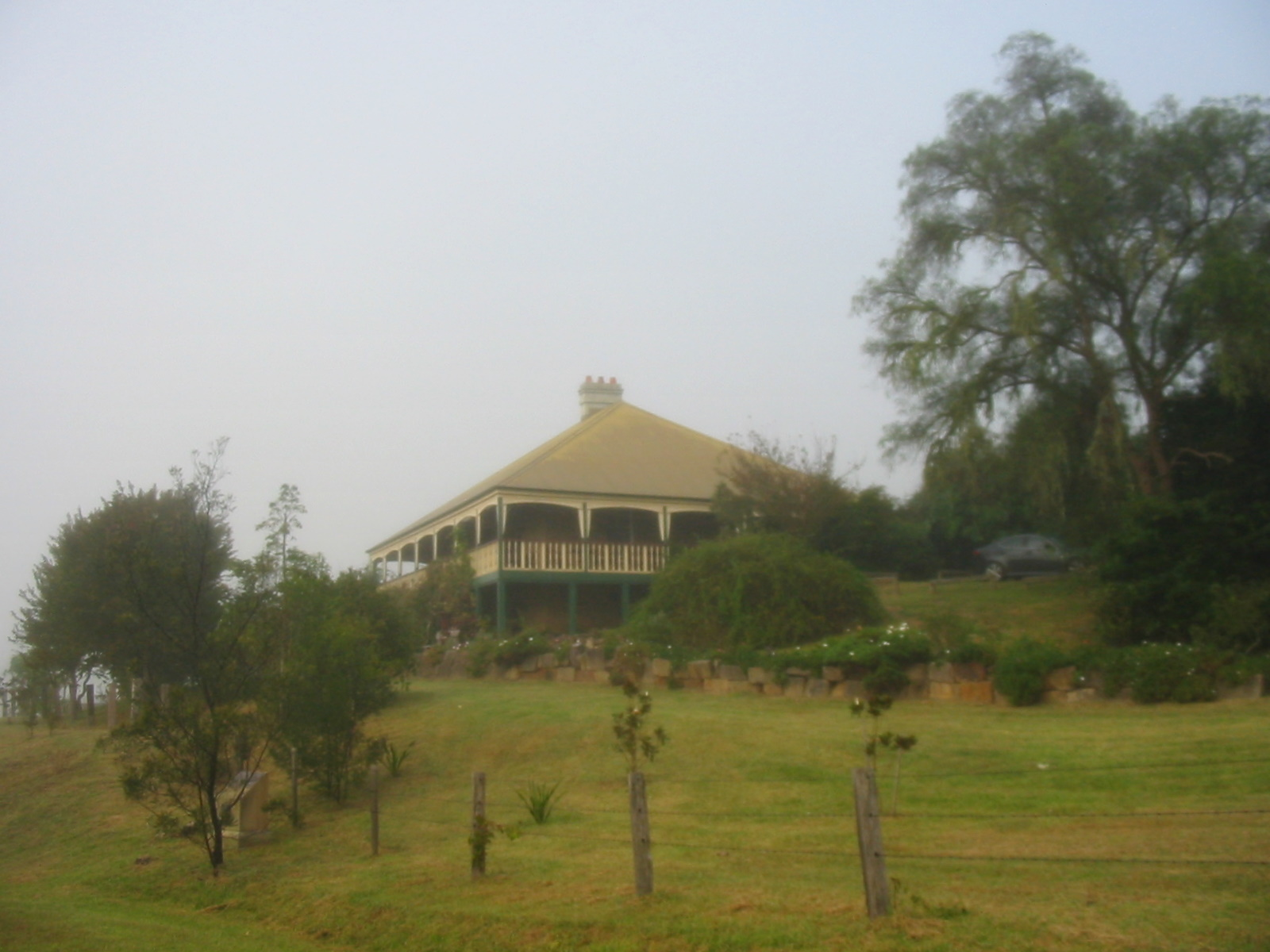
Mulla Villa

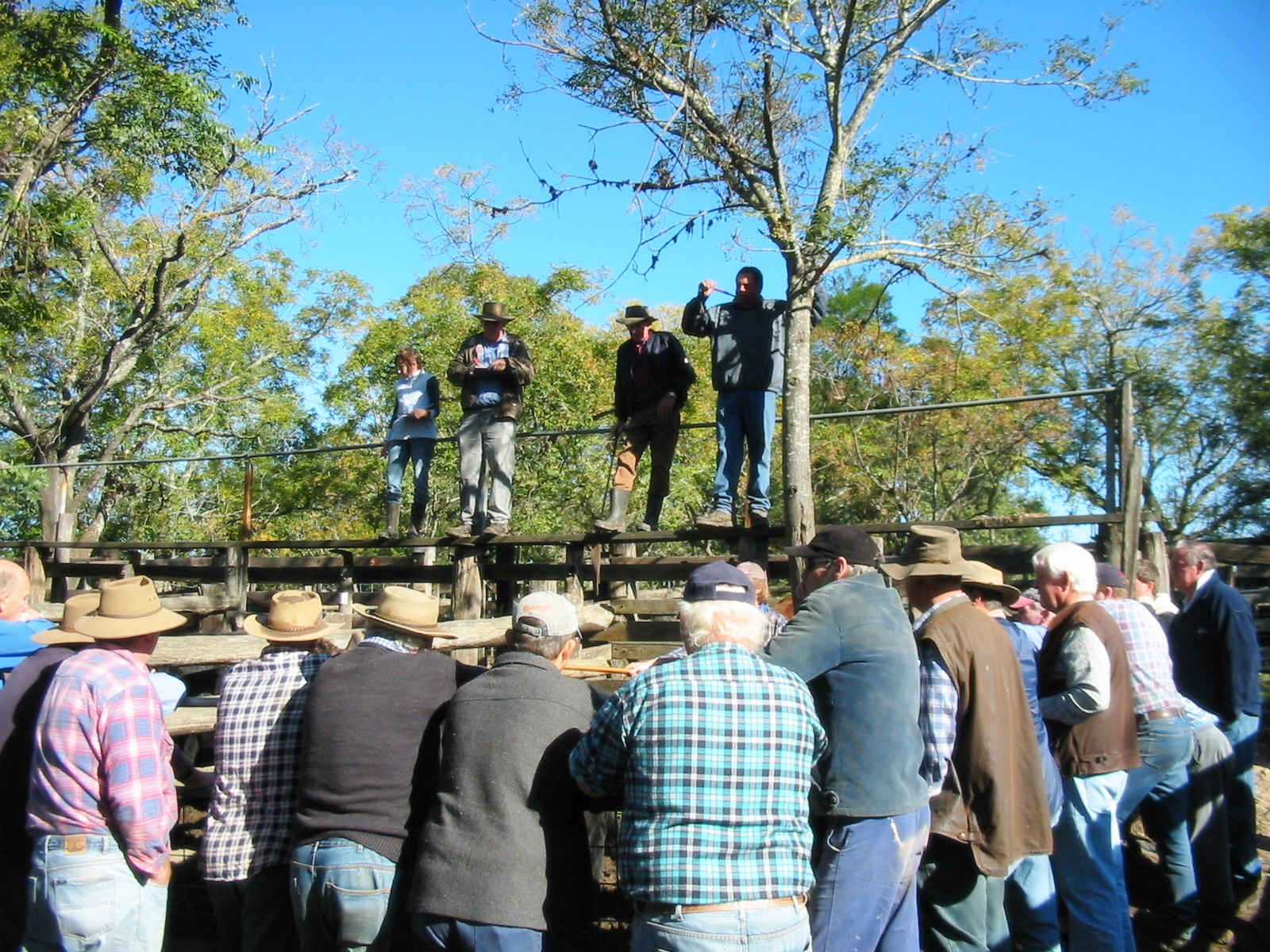
Wollombi Cattle Sales

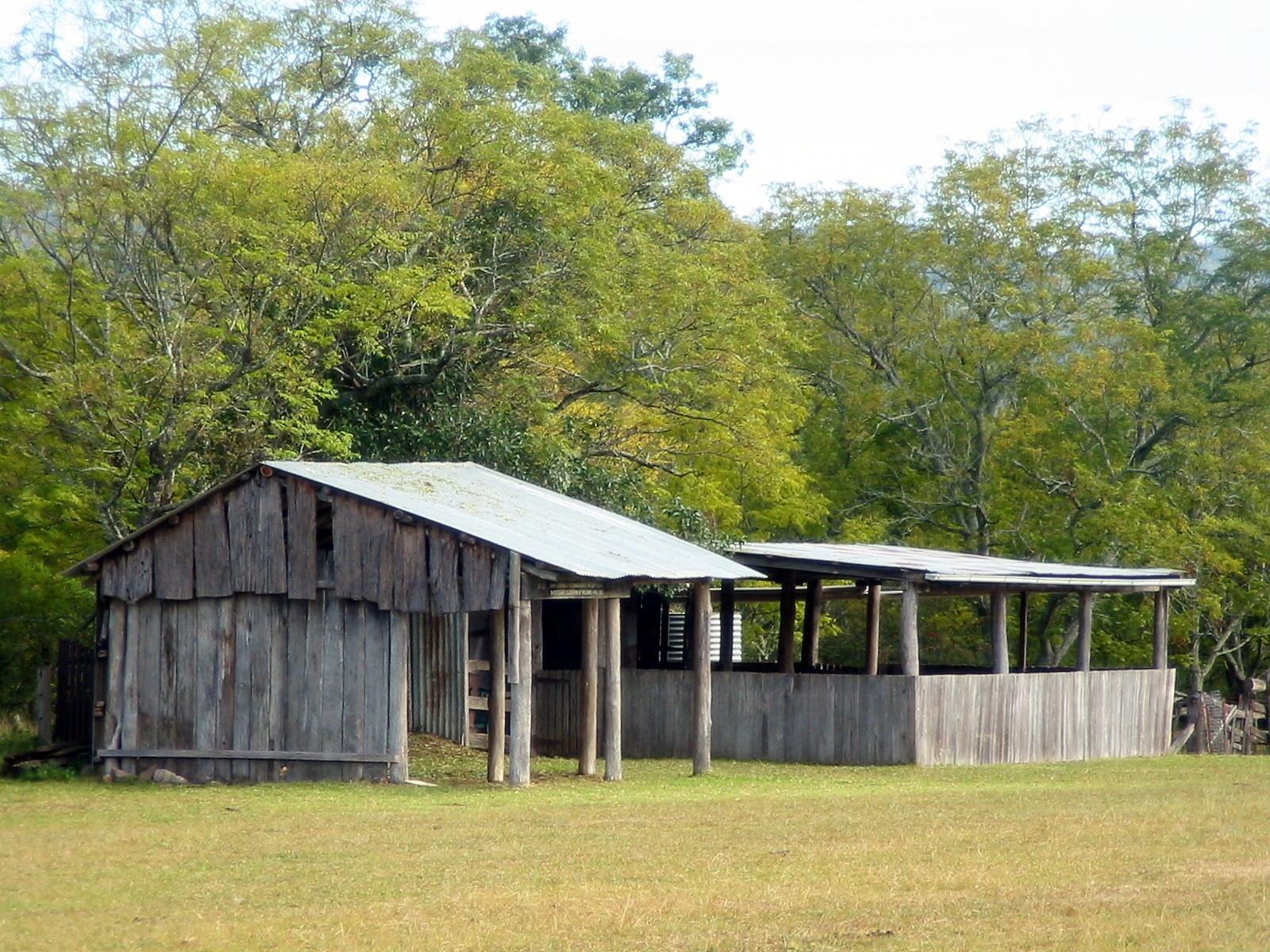
Wollombi Sale Yards

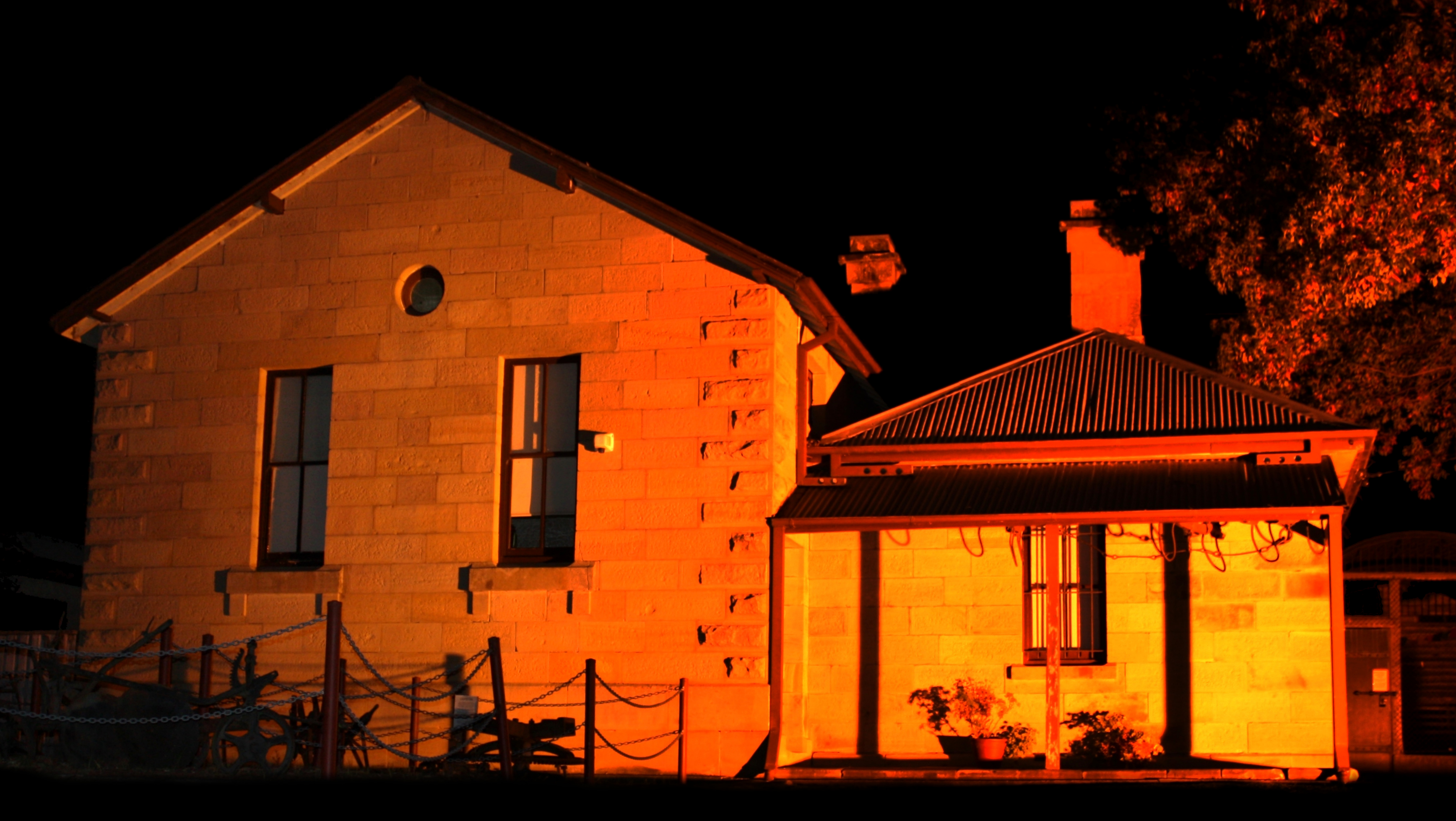
Wollombi Endeavour Museum (formerly Courthouse) at night

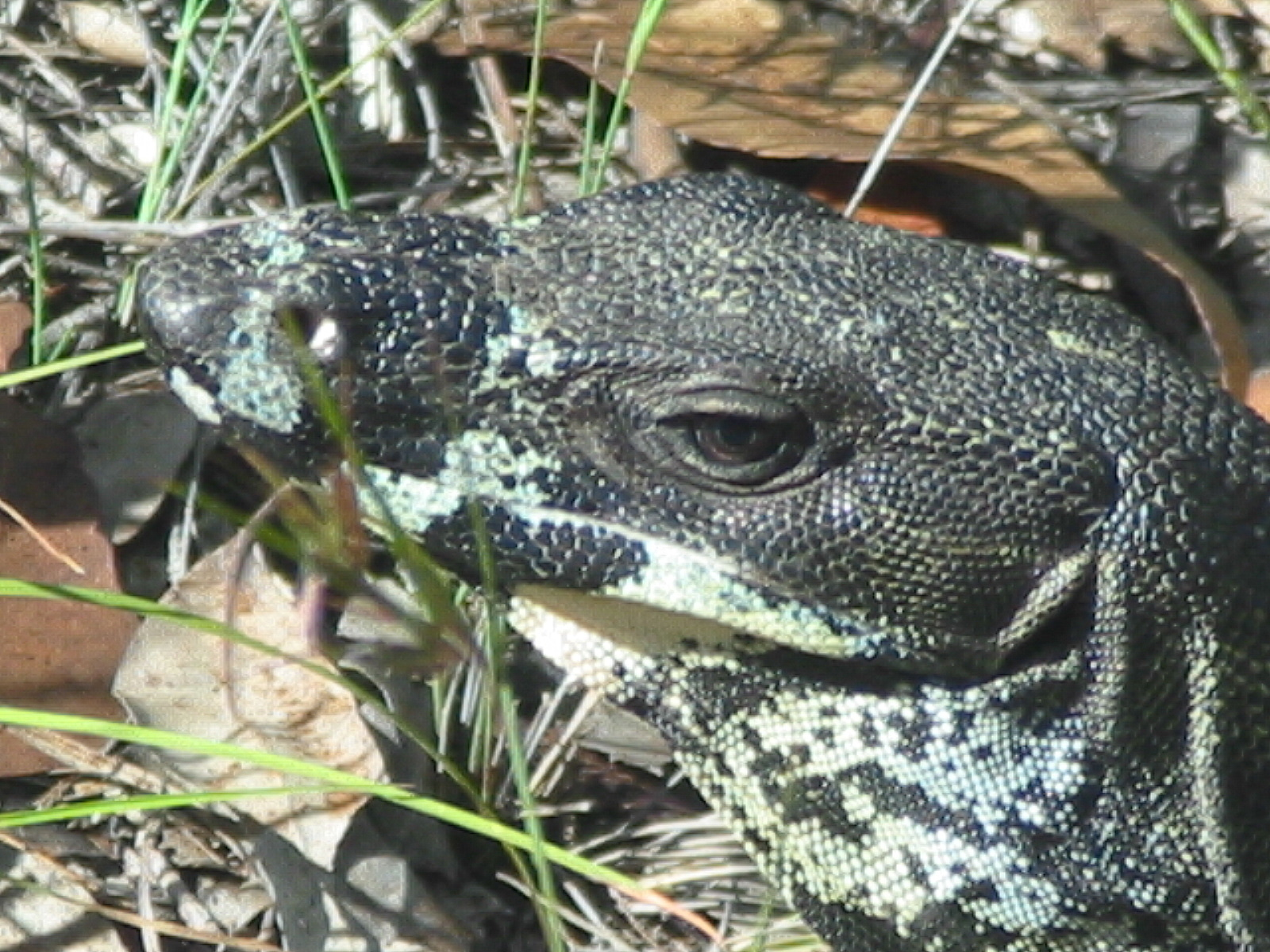
Lace Monitor (Goanna) - Varanus varius

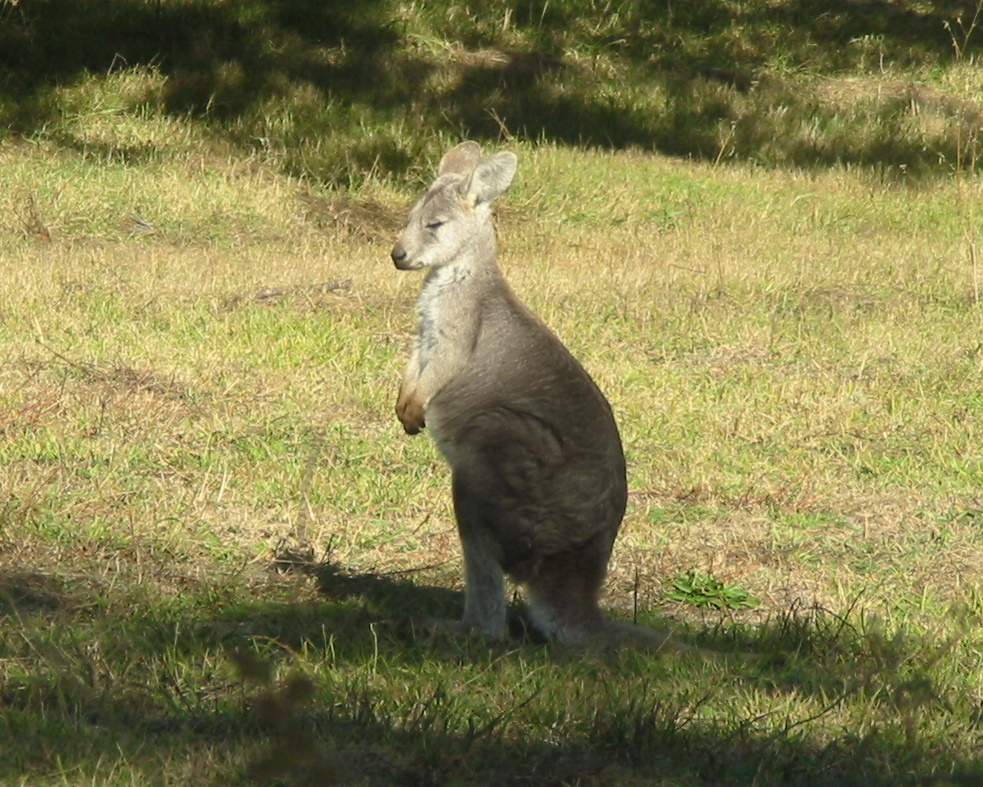
Wallaroo joey

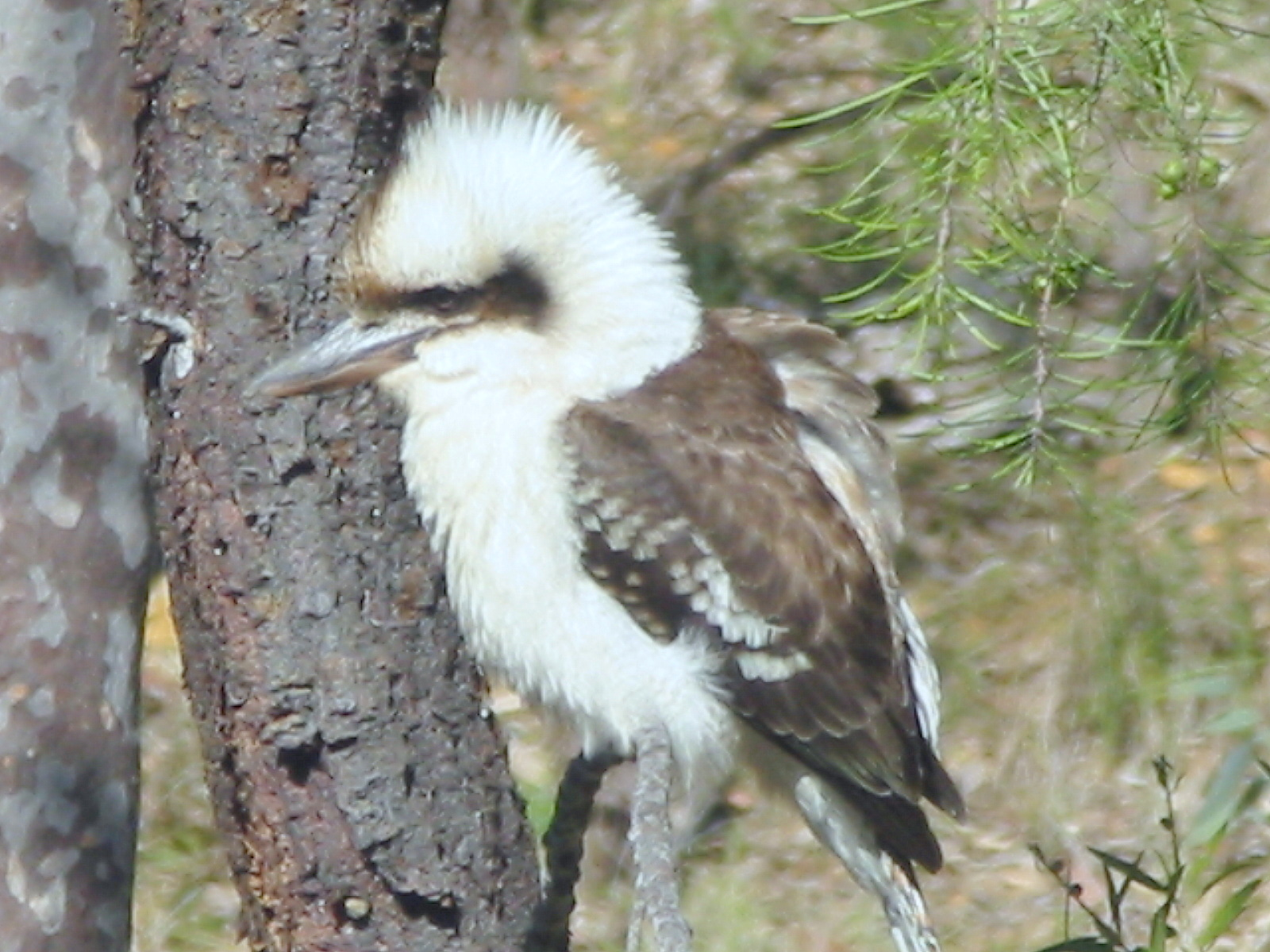
Kookaburra - Dacelo novaeguineae
