= Cedar Creek Township, Wayne County, Missouri =

Township in Wayne County, Missouri, U.S.

Coordinates: 37.2822°N 90.3992°W

Cedar Creek Township is an inactive township in Wayne County, in the U.S. state of Missouri.

Cedar Creek Township took its name from a creek of the same name within its borders.
