= Cedar Creek (Current River tributary) =

Stream in the American state of Missouri

Coordinates: 36.7503336°N 90.9204036°W

Cedar Creek is a stream in Ripley County in the U.S. state of Missouri. It is a tributary of the Current River.

Cedar Creek was so named on account of cedar timber in the area.

== See also ==
- List of rivers of Missouri
