= Cedar Fork, Virginia =

Unincorporated community in Virginia, United States

Coordinates: 37°57′42″N 77°32′53″W

Cedar Fork is an unincorporated community in Caroline County, in the U.S. state of Virginia.
