= Cedar Creek (Georgia) =

Stream in Floyd and Polk County, Georgia, U.S.

Coordinates: 34°26′17″N 85°17′48″W

Cedar Creek is a stream in Floyd County and Polk County, Georgia.

Cedar Creek was named for groves of cedar trees lining its banks.
