= Cedar Creek Township =

Cedar Creek Township may refer to:

== Arkansas ==
- Cedar Creek Township, Crawford County, Arkansas, in Crawford County, Arkansas

== Indiana ==
- Cedar Creek Township, Allen County, Indiana
- Cedar Creek Township, Lake County, Indiana

== Michigan ==
- Cedar Creek Township, Muskegon County, Michigan
- Cedar Creek Township, Wexford County, Michigan

== Missouri ==
- Cedar Creek Township, Wayne County, Missouri

== North Carolina ==
- Cedar Creek Township, Cumberland County, North Carolina, in Cumberland County, North Carolina

== North Dakota ==
- Cedar Creek Township, Slope County, North Dakota, in Slope County, North Dakota
