= Cedar Creek (Platte River tributary) =

Stream in Nebraska, USA

Coordinates: 41°02′24″N 96°06′54″W

Cedar Creek is a stream in the U.S. state of Nebraska. It is a tributary to the Platte River.

Cedar Creek was named for the cedar timber lining its banks.
