= Luystown, Missouri =

Unincorporated community in Missouri, United States

Coordinates: 38°33′29″N 91°50′03″W

Luystown is an unincorporated community in Osage County, in the U.S. state of Missouri.

== History ==
A post office called Luystown was established in 1881, and remained in operation until 1921. The community has the name of Andrew Luys, an early settler. A published obituary for Julia Mibord-Childers, dated October 23, 1941 noted that she was the granddaughter of Mr. Luys and that he deeded property to the town, where at the time the school house stood. It also stated that his family was prominent and had a notable part in the history of Osage County.
