= Cedar Creek (Michigan) =

Cedar Creek may refer to several small streams in the U.S. state of Michigan:

- In Arenac County:
  - The Cedar Creek Drain rises in north central Mason Township on the boundary with Iosco County and flows southeasterly into the Au Gres River in Turner Township.
    - Source:
    - Mouth:
- In Barry County:
  - The Cedar Creek rises in southeast Hope Township as the outflow of Big Cedar Lake and flows northerly into the Thornapple River in Hastings Township
    - Source:
    - Mouth:
  - The North Branch Cedar Creek rises as the outflow of a series of small ponds in northeastern Baltimore Township and flows easterly into the Cedar Creek about a mile before its outflow into the Thornapple River.
    - Source:
    - Mouth:
- In Cheboygan County:
  - The Cedar Creek is a short tributary of the Cedar River, rising in northwestern Mentor Township. It flows northerly into Pickerel Lake in southeastern Emmet County, Michigan.
    - Source:
    - Mouth:
  - The Cedar Point Creek is a short stream rising in northeastern Burt Township and flowing southerly into White Goose Bay on Burt Lake.
    - Source:
    - Mouth:
- In Gogebic County:
  - The Cedar Creek is a short stream rising in Watersmeet Township and flowing mostly north and east into the Imp Creek.
    - Source:
    - Mouth:
- In Iron County:
  - The Cedar Creek is a short stream flowing mostly northerly within Bates Township into the Olson Creek, which flows into the Chicagon Slough, and then to the Paint River.
    - Source:
    - Mouth:
- In Isabella County:
  - The Cedar Creek is a short stream flowing mostly northerly with Deerfield Township into the Chippewa River.
    - Source:
    - Mouth:
- In Kent County:
  - The Cedar Creek rises in central Nelson Township northeast of the city of Cedar Springs. It flows southwesterly then mostly south into the Rogue River in Algoma Township
    - Source:
    - Mouth:
  - The Little Cedar Creek rises in northwestern Courtland Township and flows west and south into the Cedar Creek in Algoma Township
    - Source:
    - Mouth:
- In Keweenaw County:
  - The Cedar Creek is a very short stream within Eagle Harbor Township. It flows mostly west and north into Eagle Harbor of Lake Superior.
    - Source:
    - Mouth:

== Notes ==
44°09′43″N 83°51′52″W 44°07′14″N 83°42′21″W 42°30′54″N 085°20′34″W 42°36′49″N 85°13′42″W 42°35′07″N 85°17′24″W 42°35′44″N 85°15′15″W 45°21′56″N 084°42′46″W 45°23′21″N 84°43′30″W 45°32′01″N 084°38′37″W 45°31′12″N 84°38′18″W 46°12′26″N 89°07′24″W 46°14′03″N 089°04′15″W 46°07′56″N 088°30′21″W 46°08′53″N 88°29′34″W 43°31′44″N 084°53′31″W 43°34′15″N 084°54′18″W 43°14′17″N 085°31′00″W 43°08′54″N 085°35′52″W 43°12′08″N 085°32′55″W 43°10′35″N 085°36′40″W 47°26′44″N 088°07′05″W 47°27′20″N 088°09′00″W
