= National Register of Historic Places listings in Osage County, Missouri =

Location of Osage County in Missouri

This is a list of the National Register of Historic Places listings in Osage County, Missouri.

This is intended to be a complete list of the properties and districts on the National Register of Historic Places in Osage County, Missouri, United States. Latitude and longitude coordinates are provided for many National Register properties and districts; these locations may be seen together in a map.

There are 9 properties and districts listed on the National Register in the county.

This National Park Service list is complete through NPS recent listings posted March 14, 2025.

== Current listings ==
	Name on the Register	Image	Date listed	Location	City or town	Description
1	Bonnots Mill Historic District		January 21, 1993 (#92001738)	Roughly Old Mill Rd., Riverside Dr., Highwater Rd., Iris Ave., Wildwood Ln., Hwy. A and Main, Short and Church Hill Sts. 38°34′38″N 91°57′47″W	Bonnots Mill	
2	Chamois Public School		June 26, 2003 (#03000295)	402 S. Main St. 38°40′23″N 91°46′06″W	Chamois	
3	Dauphine Hotel	Dauphine Hotel	November 14, 1980 (#80002386)	Off Route A 38°34′44″N 91°57′51″W	Bonnots Mill	
4	Huber's Ferry Farmstead Historic District	Huber's Ferry Farmstead Historic District	January 15, 1999 (#98001609)	Junction of U.S. Routes 50 and 63; 38°29′27″N 92°00′23″W	Jefferson City	
5	Osage County Poorhouse	Osage County Poorhouse	February 13, 1998 (#98000038)	Route 621, 0.5 miles (0.80 km) south of Linn; 38°28′45″N 91°51′18″W	Linn	
6	Sacred Heart Catholic Church and Parsonage		September 9, 1982 (#82003155)	Route U 38°23′49″N 91°52′53″W	Rich Fountain	
7	St. Joseph Church	St. Joseph Church	April 11, 1972 (#72000726)	Main St. 38°26′28″N 91°59′45″W	Westphalia	
8	Alvah Washington Townley Farmstead Historic District		August 5, 1999 (#99000937)	304 S. Market St. 38°40′25″N 91°46′10″W	Chamois	
9	Dr. Enoch T. and Amy Zewicki House	Dr. Enoch T. and Amy Zewicki House	February 27, 2002 (#02000121)	402 E. Main St. 38°29′06″N 91°51′02″W	Linn	

== See also ==
- List of National Historic Landmarks in Missouri
- National Register of Historic Places listings in Missouri
