= Dooling Creek =

Stream in the US state of Missouri

Dooling Creek is a stream in Osage County of central Missouri. It is a tributary of the Missouri River.

The stream headwaters are at 38°37′57″N 91°46′46″W at an elevation of about 720 feet (220 m) and it flows north and northeast passing west and north of Chamois before reaching its confluence with the Missouri at 38°40′58″N 91°45′35″W at an elevation of 522 feet (159 m).

Variant names were "Doolings Creek" and "Doolins Creek". The creek derives its name from the local Doolin family.

== See also ==
- List of rivers of Missouri
