= Chamois, Missouri =

City in Osage County, Missouri, United States

- City
- City of Chamois
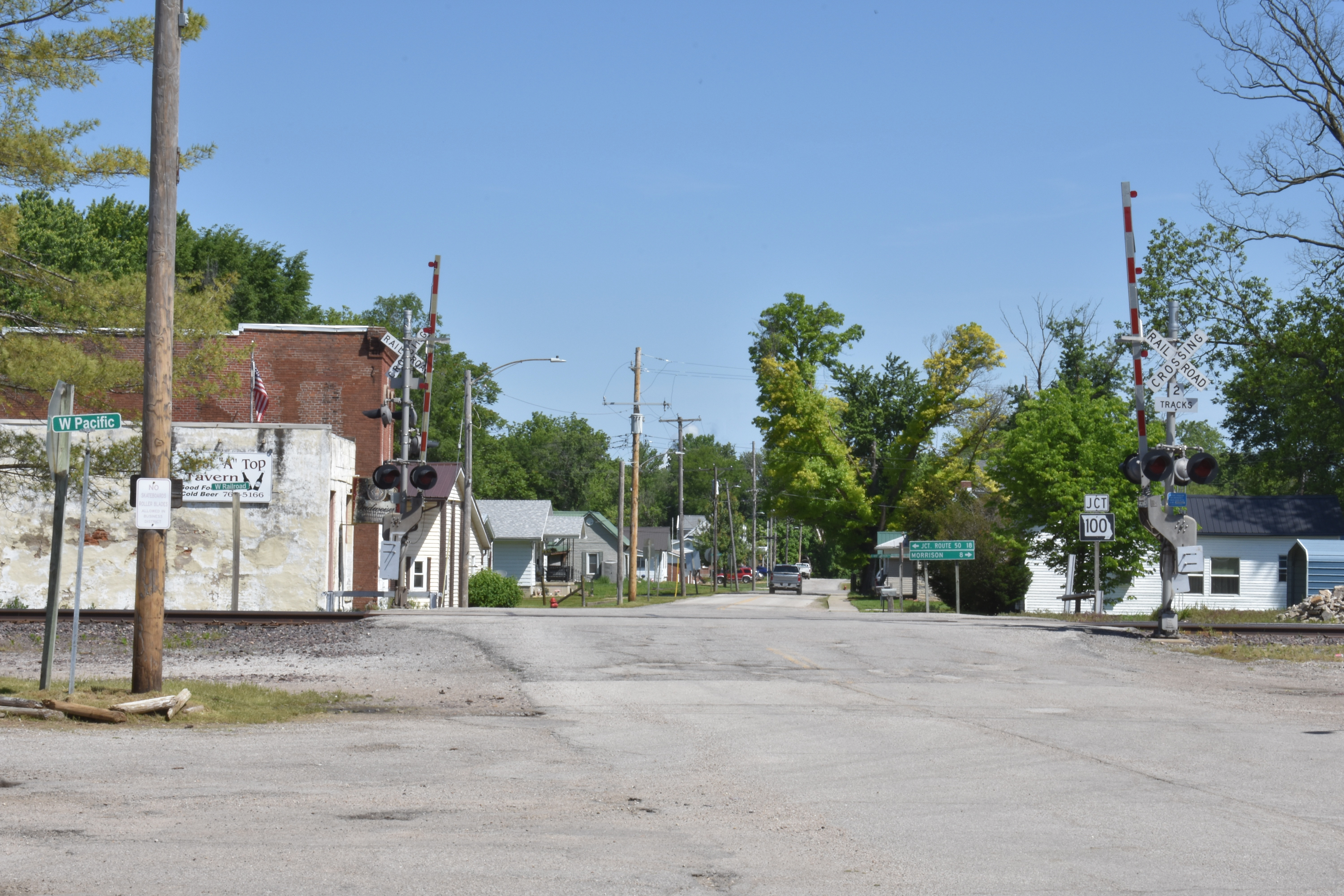
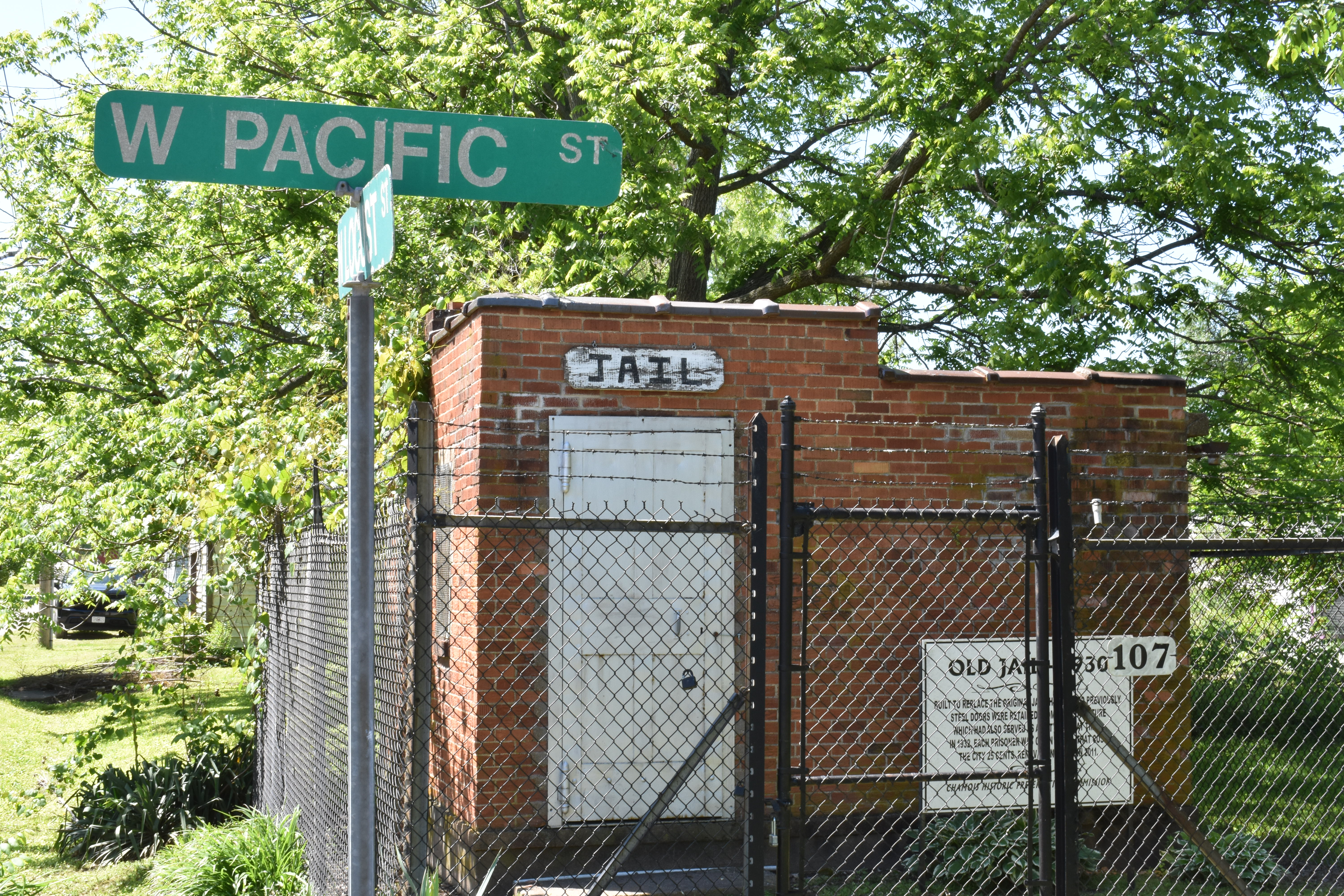
- Chamois Railroad Crossing Old Chamois Jail
- Nickname: Chammy Town
- Location of Chamois, Missouri
- Coordinates: 38°40′35″N 91°46′12″W
- Country: United States
- State: Missouri
- County: Osage
- Founded: 1856

Area
  - Total: 0.39 sq mi (1.02 km^{2})
  - Land: 0.37 sq mi (0.96 km^{2})
  - Water: 0.023 sq mi (0.06 km^{2})
- Elevation: 535 ft (163 m)

Population (2020)
  - Total: 377
  - Density: 1,017.7/sq mi (392.93/km^{2})
- Time zone: UTC-6 (Central (CST))
  - Summer (DST): UTC-5 (CDT)
- ZIP code: 65024
- Area code: 573
- FIPS code: 29-13060
- GNIS feature ID: 2393795
- Website: cityofchamois.org

Chamois (/ʃəˈmɔɪ/ shə-MOY) is a city in Osage County, Missouri, United States. The population was 377 at the 2020 census. It is part of the Jefferson City, Missouri Metropolitan Statistical Area.

== History ==
Chamois was platted in 1856, and named after the chamois, a European animal. A post office called Chamois has been in operation since 1856. Besides the post office, the community had a depot on the Missouri Pacific Railroad.

The Chamois Public School and Alvah Washington Townley Farmstead Historic District are listed on the National Register of Historic Places.

== Geography ==
The city lies above the south bank of the Missouri River valley. Dooling Creek flows past the west and north sides of the city. Missouri Route 89 passes through the town and intersects Missouri Route 100 in the north part of the town, within the Missouri River valley.

According to the United States Census Bureau, the city has a total area of 0.40 square miles (1.04 km^{2}), of which 0.37 square miles (0.96 km^{2}) is land and 0.03 square miles (0.08 km^{2}) is water.

== Demographics ==
Historical population
Census	Pop.	Note	%±
1880	562		—
1890	769		36.8%
1900	726		−5.6%
1910	649		−10.6%
1920	700		7.9%
1930	675		−3.6%
1940	771		14.2%
1950	621		−19.5%
1960	658		6.0%
1970	615		−6.5%
1980	546		−11.2%
1990	449		−17.8%
2000	456		1.6%
2010	396		−13.2%
2020	377		−4.8%
U.S. Decennial Census

=== 2010 census ===
As of the census of 2010, there were 396 people, 168 households, and 97 families living in the city. The population density was 1,070.3 inhabitants per square mile (413.2/km^{2}). There were 230 housing units at an average density of 621.6 per square mile (240.0/km^{2}). The racial makeup of the city was 99.2% White, 0.3% Native American, 0.3% from other races, and 0.3% from two or more races. Hispanic or Latino of any race were 1.0% of the population.

There were 168 households, of which 32.1% had children under the age of 18 living with them, 38.7% were married couples living together, 10.7% had a female householder with no husband present, 8.3% had a male householder with no wife present, and 42.3% were non-families. 38.1% of all households were made up of individuals, and 20.9% had someone living alone who was 65 years of age or older. The average household size was 2.36 and the average family size was 3.04.

The median age in the city was 35.7 years. 27.5% of residents were under the age of 18; 7.4% were between the ages of 18 and 24; 26.3% were from 25 to 44; 22.5% were from 45 to 64; and 16.4% were 65 years of age or older. The gender makeup of the city was 48.0% male and 52.0% female.

=== 2000 census ===
As of the census of 2000, there were 456 people, 194 households, and 112 families living in the city. The population density was 1,268.3 inhabitants per square mile (489.7/km^{2}). There were 230 housing units at an average density of 639.7 per square mile (247.0/km^{2}). The racial makeup of the city was 97.81% White, 0.22% Native American, and 1.97% from two or more races. Hispanic or Latino of any race were 0.44% of the population.

There were 194 households, out of which 28.4% had children under the age of 18 living with them, 50.0% were married couples living together, 7.2% had a female householder with no husband present, and 41.8% were non-families. 39.2% of all households were made up of individuals, and 25.8% had someone living alone who was 65 years of age or older. The average household size was 2.35 and the average family size was 3.16.

In the city the population was spread out, with 27.6% under the age of 18, 9.0% from 18 to 24, 22.6% from 25 to 44, 19.1% from 45 to 64, and 21.7% who were 65 years of age or older. The median age was 35 years. For every 100 females, there were 83.1 males. For every 100 females age 18 and over, there were 77.4 males.

The median income for a household in the city was $26,563, and the median income for a family was $32,813. Males had a median income of $26,719 versus $20,568 for females. The per capita income for the city was $12,226. About 11.5% of families and 17.9% of the population were below the poverty line, including 20.5% of those under age 18 and 11.8% of those age 65 or over.

== Education ==
It is in the Osage County R-I School District.

== See also ==
- List of cities in Missouri
