= Dauphine Hotel =

- U.S. National Register of Historic Places
- U.S. Historic district – Contributing property
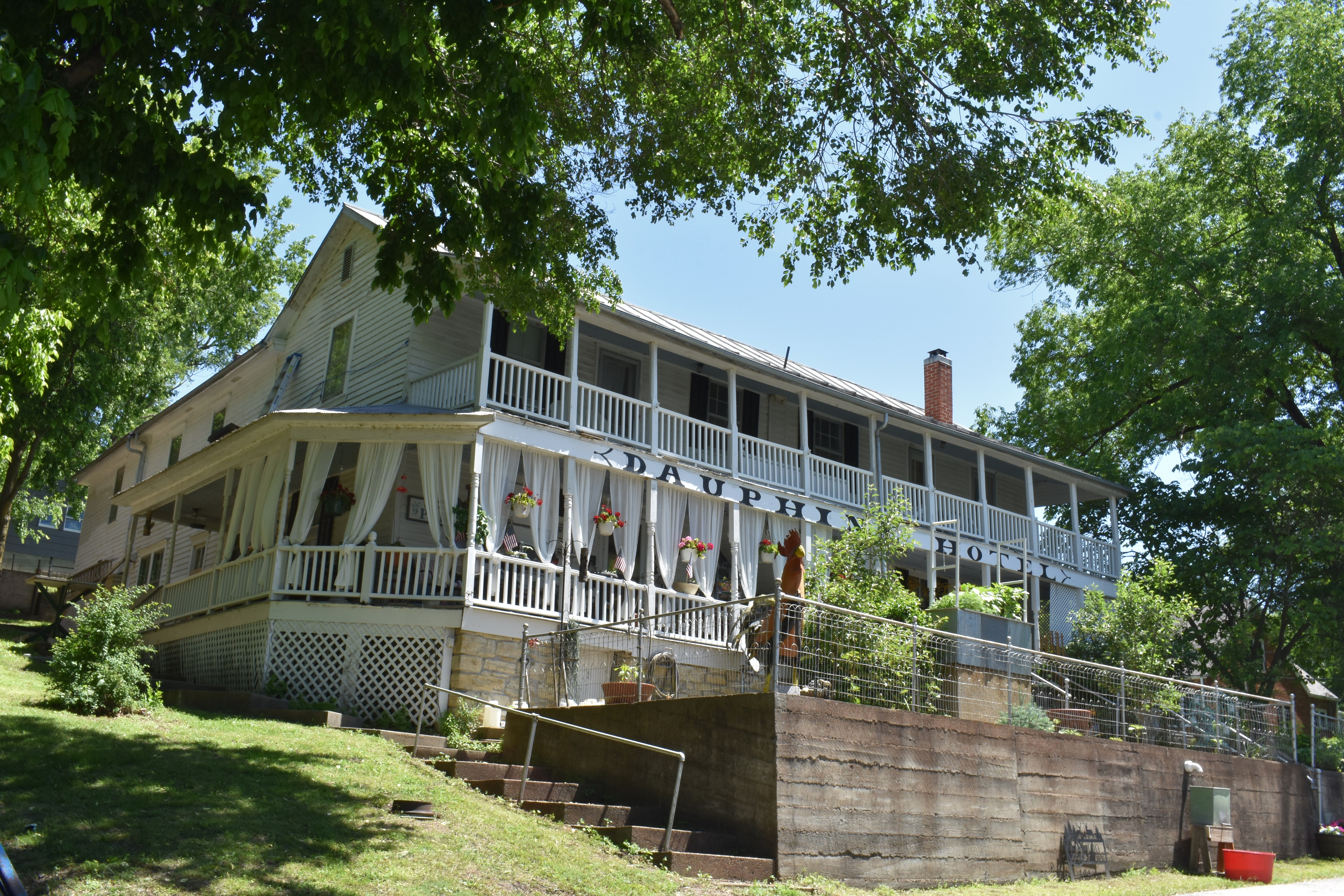
- Dauphine Hotel

- Location within Missouri Location within the United States
- Location: Off MO A, Bonnot's Mill, Missouri
- Coordinates: 38°34′44″N 91°57′51″W
- Area: less than one acre
- Built: c. 1840, 1879
- NRHP reference No.: 80002386
- Added to NRHP: November 14, 1980

The Dauphine Hotel is a historic hotel building located at Bonnots Mill, Osage County, Missouri. It was built about 1840 and expanded in 1879, and is a two-story, frame and brick building with a modified "U"-plan. The main block is six bays long and a two-story gallery spans its entire front.

It was listed on the National Register of Historic Places in 1980. It is located in the Bonnots Mill Historic District.
