= St. Joseph Church (Westphalia, Missouri) =

Historic church in Missouri, United States

- U.S. National Register of Historic Places
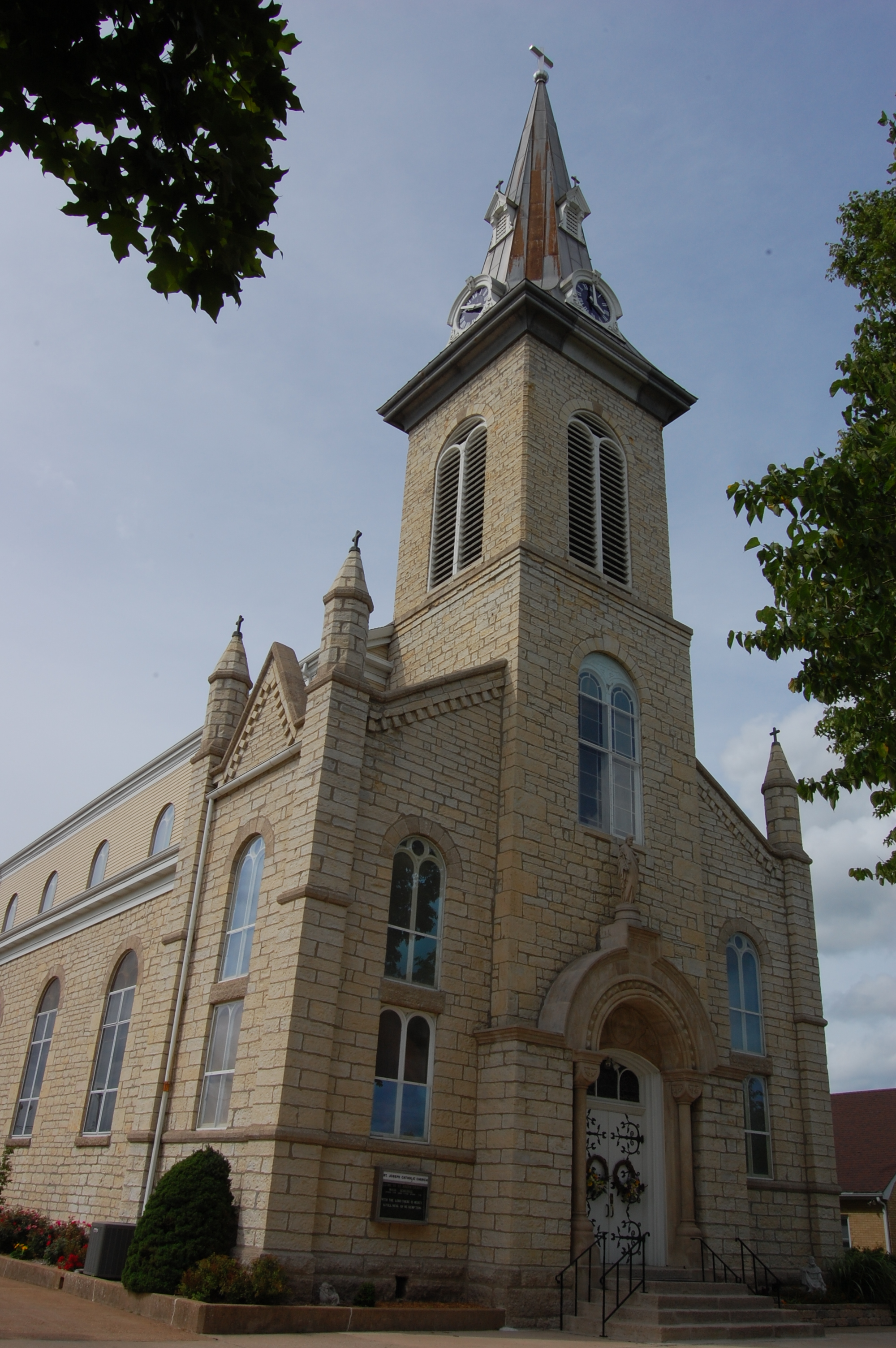
- St. Joseph Church

- Location within Missouri Location within the United States
- Location: Main St., Westphalia, Missouri
- Coordinates: 38°26′28″N 91°59′45″W
- Area: 9.9 acres (4.0 ha)
- Built: 1848
- Architectural style: Gothic-Romanesque
- NRHP reference No.: 72000726
- Added to NRHP: April 11, 1972

St. Joseph Church is a historic Roman Catholic church located on Main Street in Westphalia, Osage County, Missouri. The Gothic-Romanesque building was constructed in 1848. Architectural features include limestone and cottonstone construction, a frame clerestory, and an octagonal apse. A central belfry steeple was added in 1883. The entire structure was remodeled and enlarged in 1905.

The church functioned as the headquarters for the Jesuit Central Missouri Mission from 1838 to 1883 and has been a parish church ever since.

It was added to the National Register of Historic Places in 1972.
