= Alvah Washington Townley Farmstead Historic District =

- U.S. National Register of Historic Places
- U.S. Historic district
- Location within Missouri Location within the United States
- Location: 304 S. Market St., Chamois, Missouri
- Coordinates: 38°40′25″N 91°46′10″W
- Area: less than one acre
- Built: 1856
- Architectural style: Greek Revival, I-house
- NRHP reference No.: 99000937
- Added to NRHP: August 5, 1999

Alvah Washington Townley Farmstead Historic District, also known as Osage County Museum, is a historic farm and national historic district located at Chamois, Osage County, Missouri. It encompasses five contributing buildings. They are the two-story, frame I-house (c. 1856) with modest Greek Revival styling; a smokehouse (c. 1875); multipurpose barn (c. 1872); wood and machine shed (c. 1874); and a combination poultry house, outhouse, and storage shed (c. 1870). The property was deeded it to the Osage County Historical Society, who operate it as a museum.

It was listed on the National Register of Historic Places in 2003.
