= Rich Fountain, Missouri =

Unincorporated community in Missouri, United States

Coordinates: 38°23′45″N 91°52′48″W

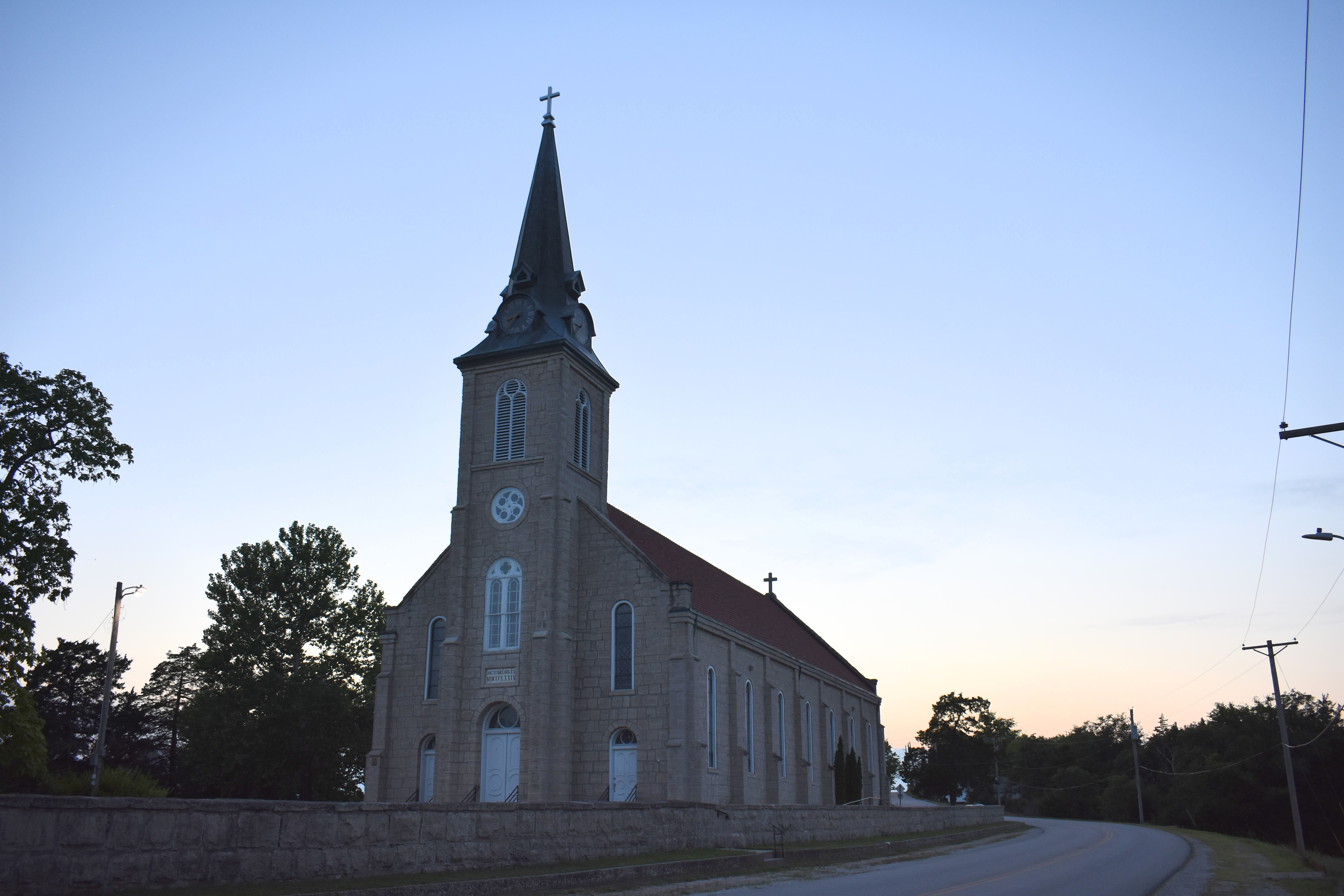
Sacred Heart Catholic Church

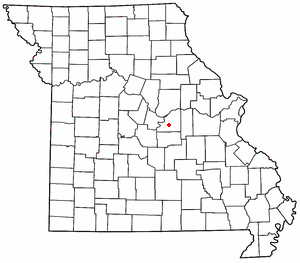

Rich Fountain is an unincorporated community in Osage County, Missouri, United States. It is located approximately three miles east of U.S. Route 63 and is fifteen miles southeast of Jefferson City.

== History ==
Rich Fountain had its start in May 1838, when John T. Struempf built a gristmill there. The community was named for a spring near the original town site. A post office called Rich Fountain was established in 1854, and remained in operation until 1972.

The Sacred Heart Catholic Church and Parsonage was listed on the National Register of Historic Places in 1982.
