= Bonnots Mill, Missouri =

- Unincorporated community
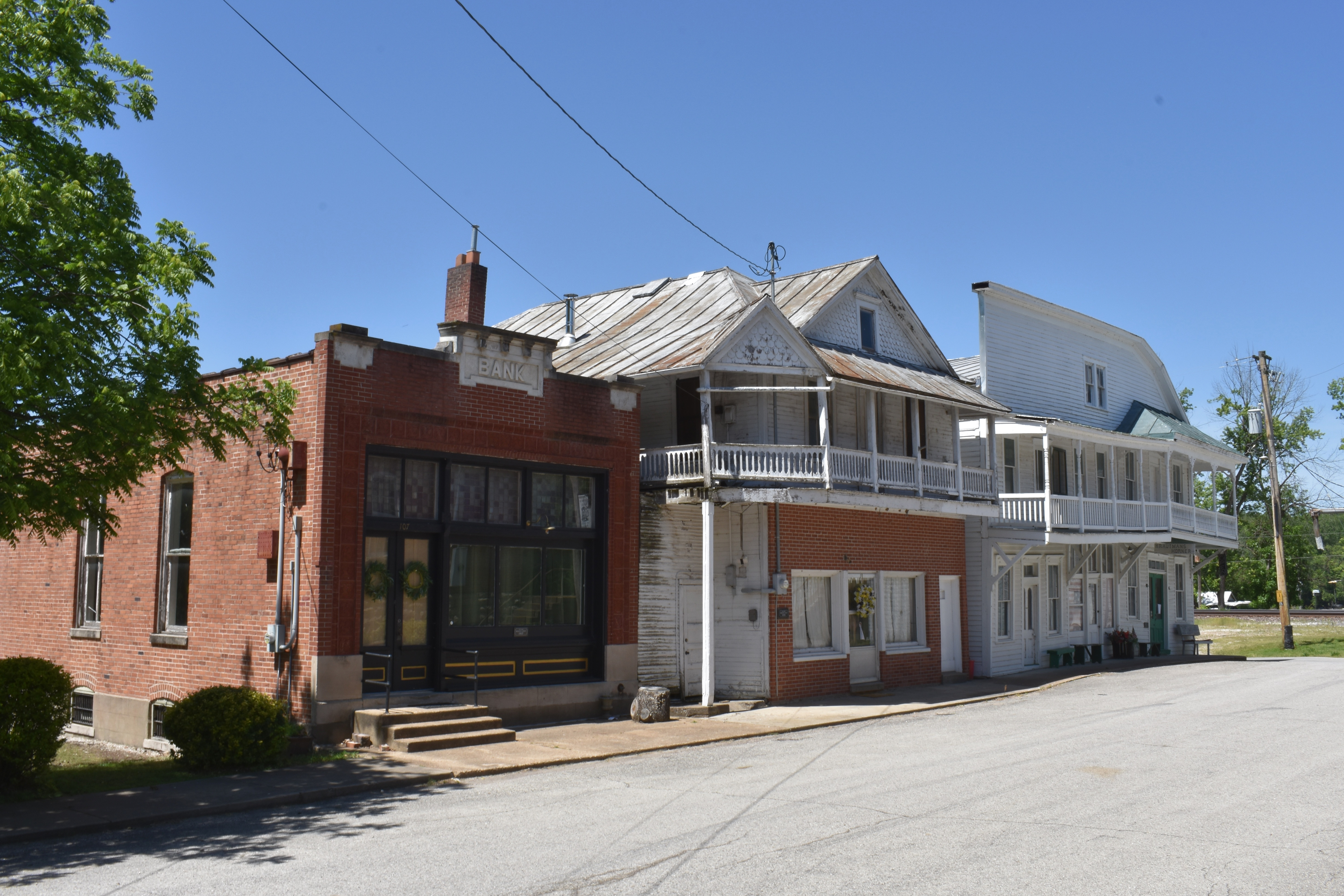
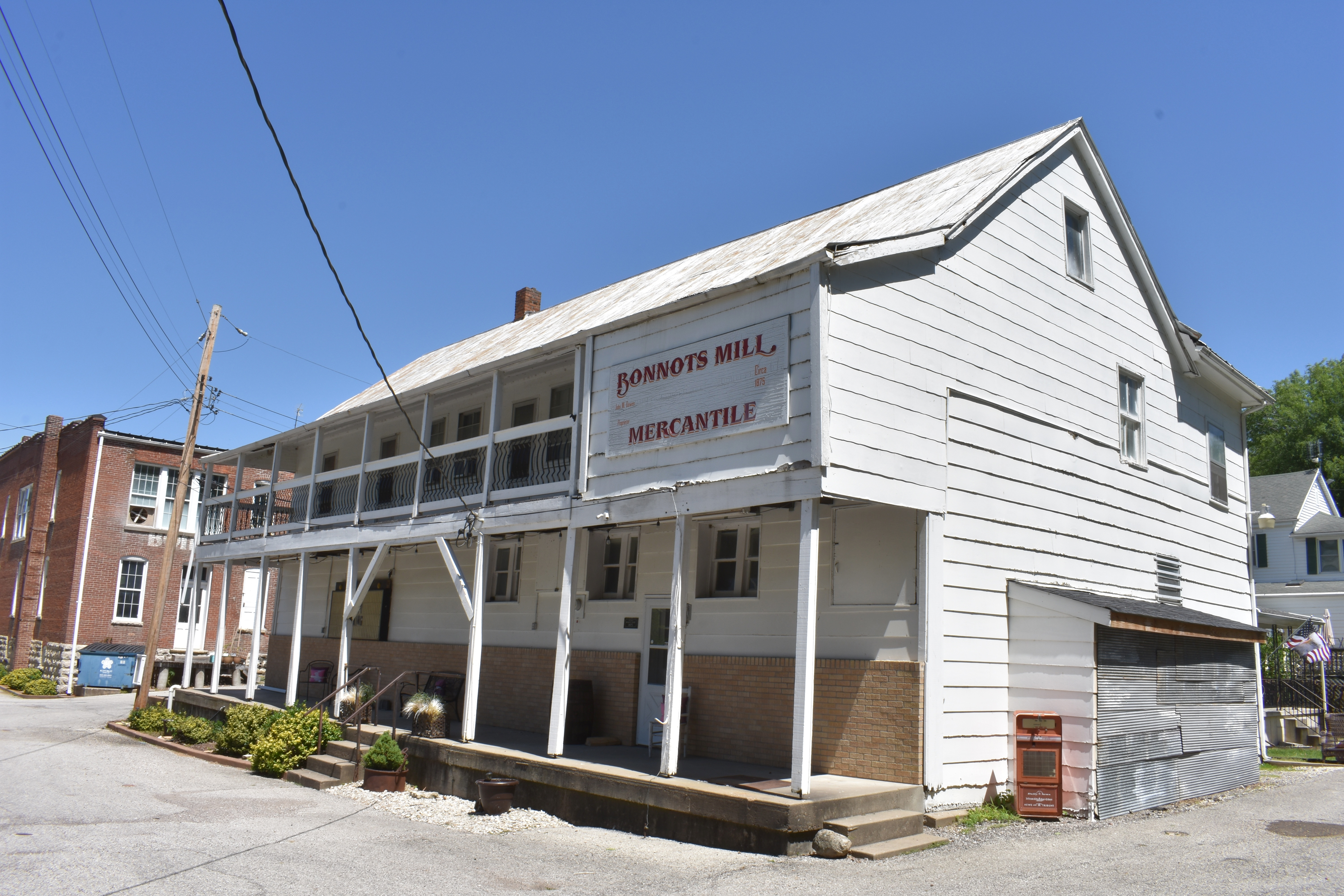
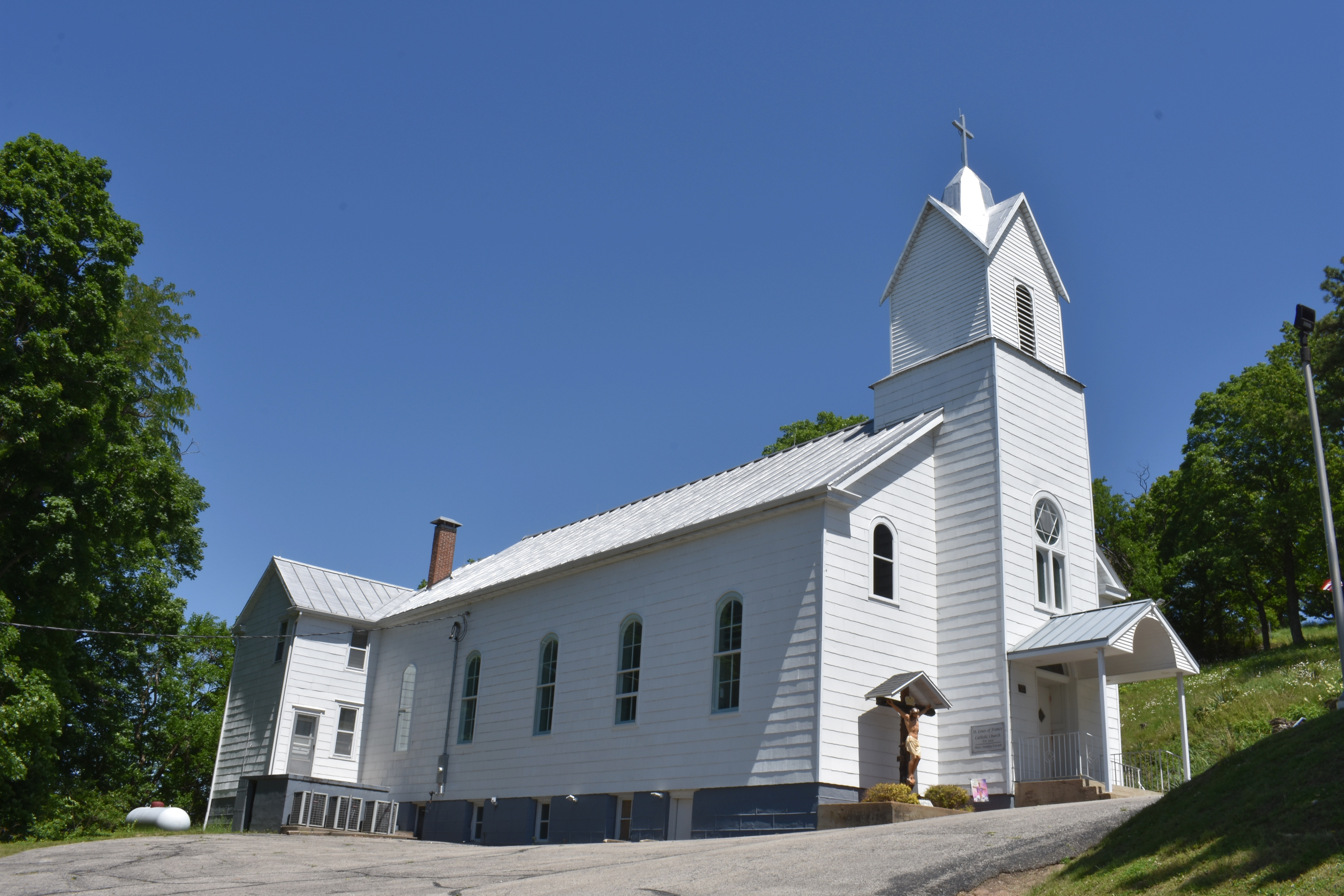
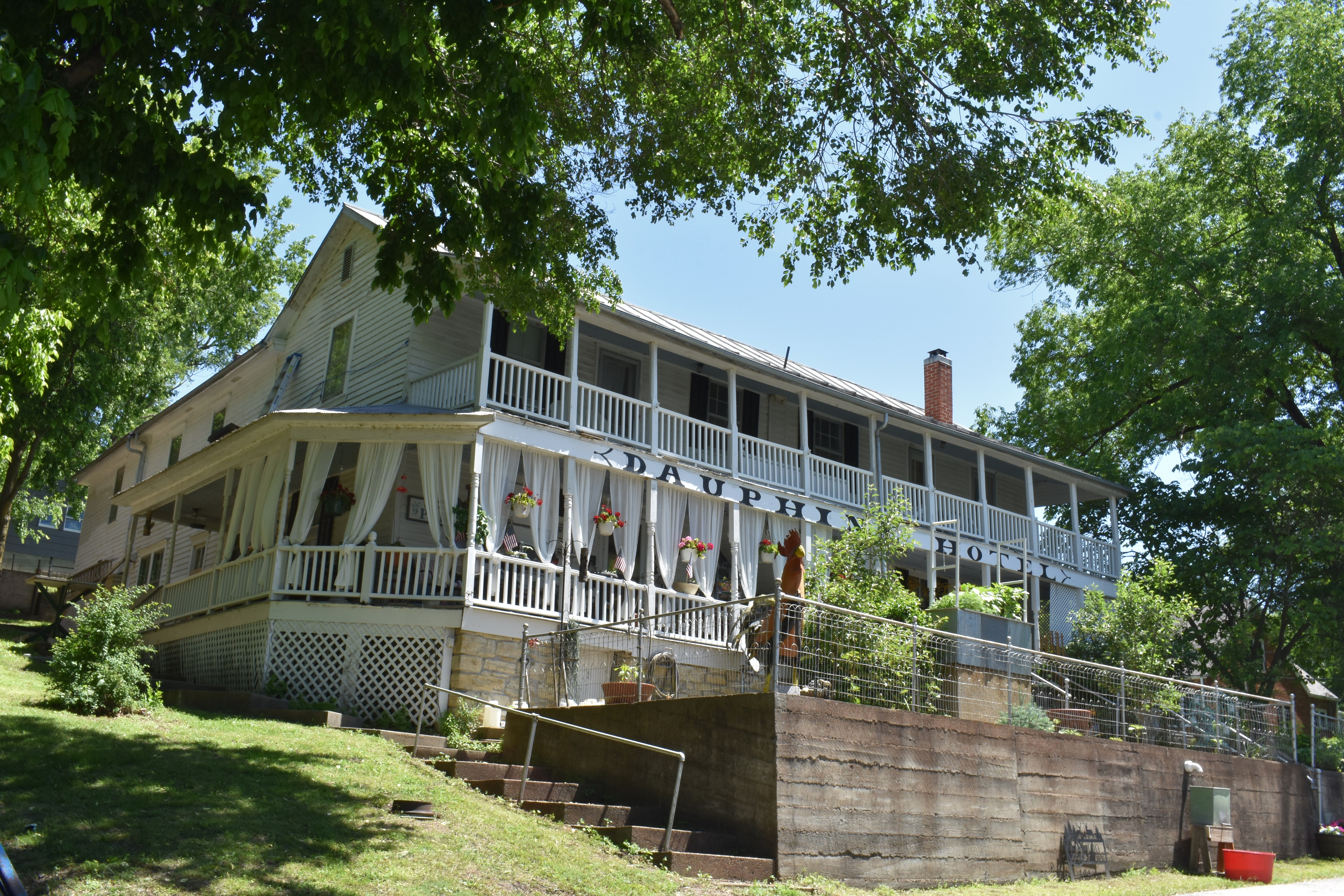
- Historic buildings on Main Street Bonnots Mill Mercantile St. Louis of France Dauphine Hotel

- Location within Missouri Location within the United States
- Coordinates: 38°34′41″N 91°57′57″W
- Country: United States
- State: Missouri
- County: Osage
- Elevation: 538 ft (164 m)
- Time zone: UTC-6 (Central (CST))
  - Summer (DST): UTC-5 (CDT)
- ZIP Code: 65016
- Area code: 573
- GNIS feature ID: 729282

Bonnots Mill is an unincorporated community in northern Osage County, Missouri, United States. It is located approximately ten miles east of Jefferson City on the Osage River, near its confluence with the Missouri River. The community of Osage City is about four miles to the west-southwest on the Osage and the community of Tebbetts lies across the Missouri River valley to the north. It has also been known as Dauphine, Bonnets Mills, Bonnots, or Bonnotts Mill.

The community was founded in 1852 by a colony of Missouri French and was named for Felix Bonnot, the owner of a local mill.

The Bonnots Mill Historic District and Dauphine Hotel are listed on the National Register of Historic Places.
