= Chamois Public School =

Historic school building in Missouri, US

- U.S. National Register of Historic Places
- Location within Missouri Location within the United States
- Location: 402 S. Main St., Chamois, Missouri
- Coordinates: 38°40′23″N 91°46′6″W
- Area: 7.4 acres (3.0 ha)
- Built: 1876, 1896
- NRHP reference No.: 03000295
- Added to NRHP: June 26, 2003

Chamois Public School, also known as American Legion Post 506, is a historic school building located at Chamois, Osage County, Missouri. It was built in 1876, and expanded in 1896. It is a two-story, L-shaped, red brick building with a three-story clock tower with a pyramidal top. It has segmental and rounded arched window openings. The American Legion purchased the building in 1947.

It was listed on the National Register of Historic Places in 2003.
