= Huber's Ferry Farmstead Historic District =

Historic district in Missouri, United States

- U.S. National Register of Historic Places
- U.S. Historic district
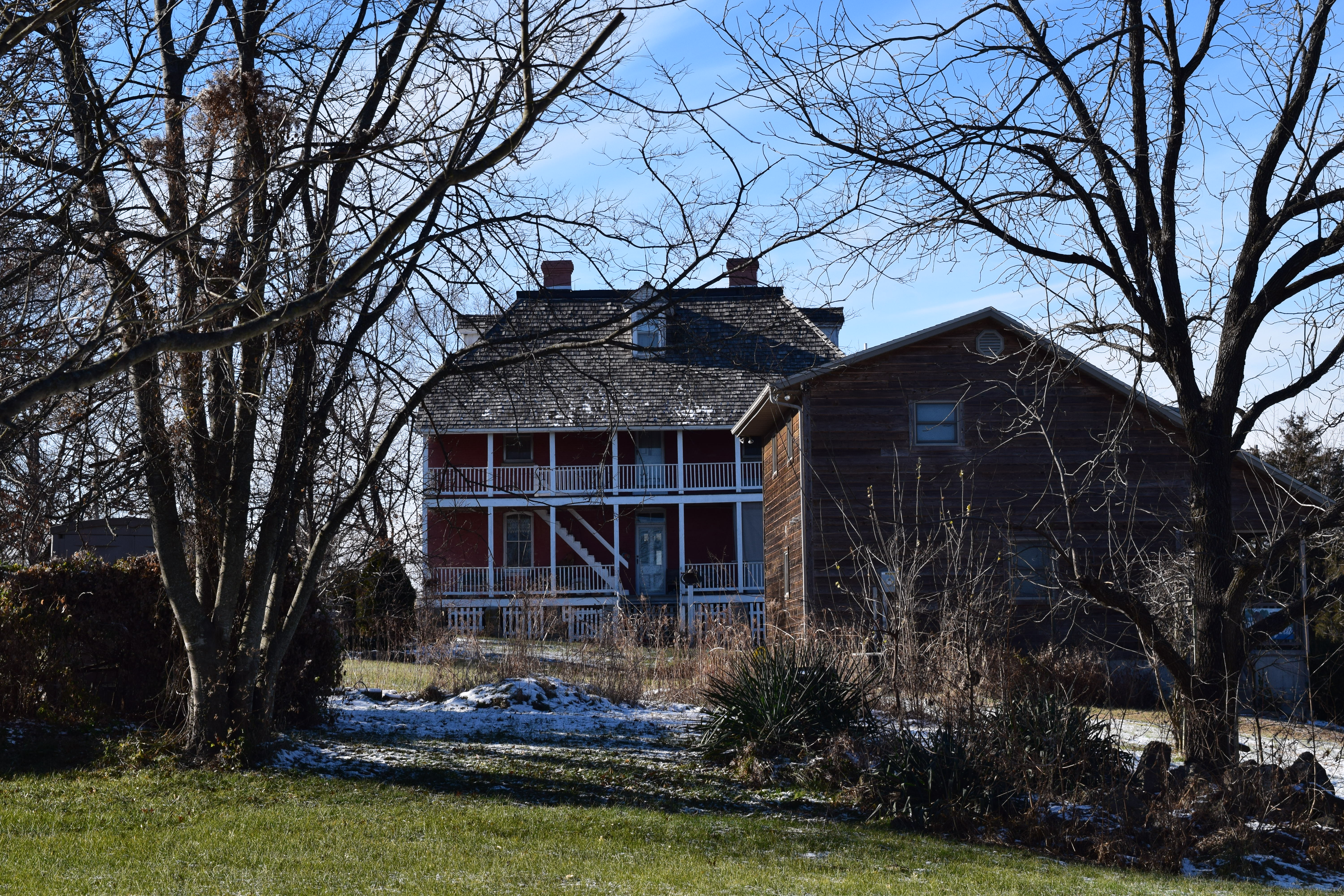

- Location within Missouri Location within the United States
- Location: jct. US 50 and US 63, near Jefferson City, Missouri
- Coordinates: 38°40′25″N 91°46′10″W
- Area: 3 acres (1.2 ha)
- Built: 1881, 1894
- Built by: Fork, Anton
- Architectural style: Missouri-German
- NRHP reference No.: 98001609
- Added to NRHP: January 15, 1999

Huber's Ferry Farmstead Historic District, also known as William L. Huber Farmstead , is a historic farm and national historic district located near Jefferson City in Osage County, Missouri. It encompasses two contributing buildings and one contributing structure associated with a late-19th century farmstead. They are the 2 1/2-story, five bay brick farmhouse (1881); a single story log structure, and a massive frame bank barn (1894). The house has a hipped roof and features a central two-story porch sheltering doors on each floor.

It was listed on the National Register of Historic Places in 1999.
