= Westphalia, Missouri =

City in Osage County, Missouri, United States

- City
- City of Westphalia
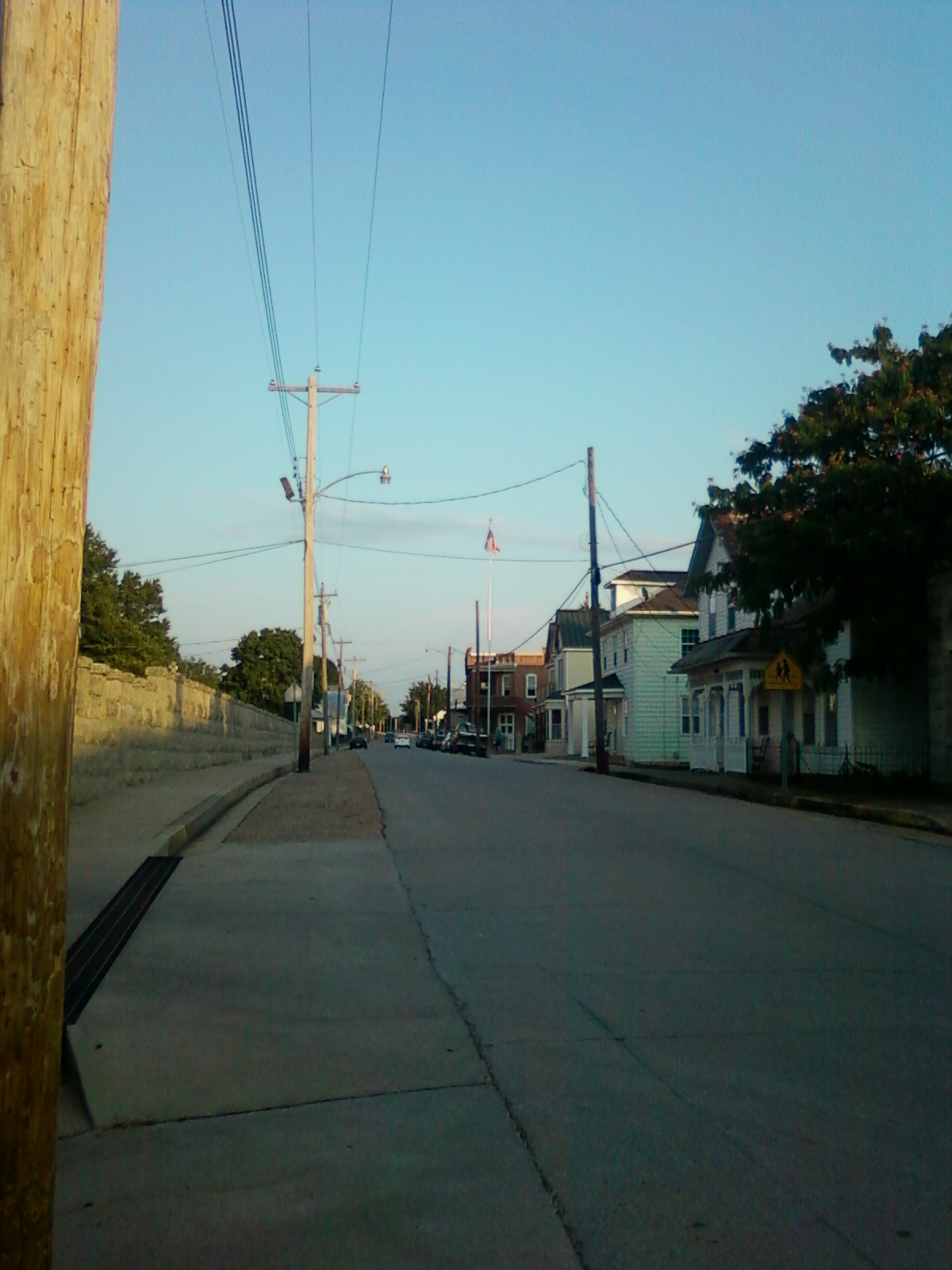
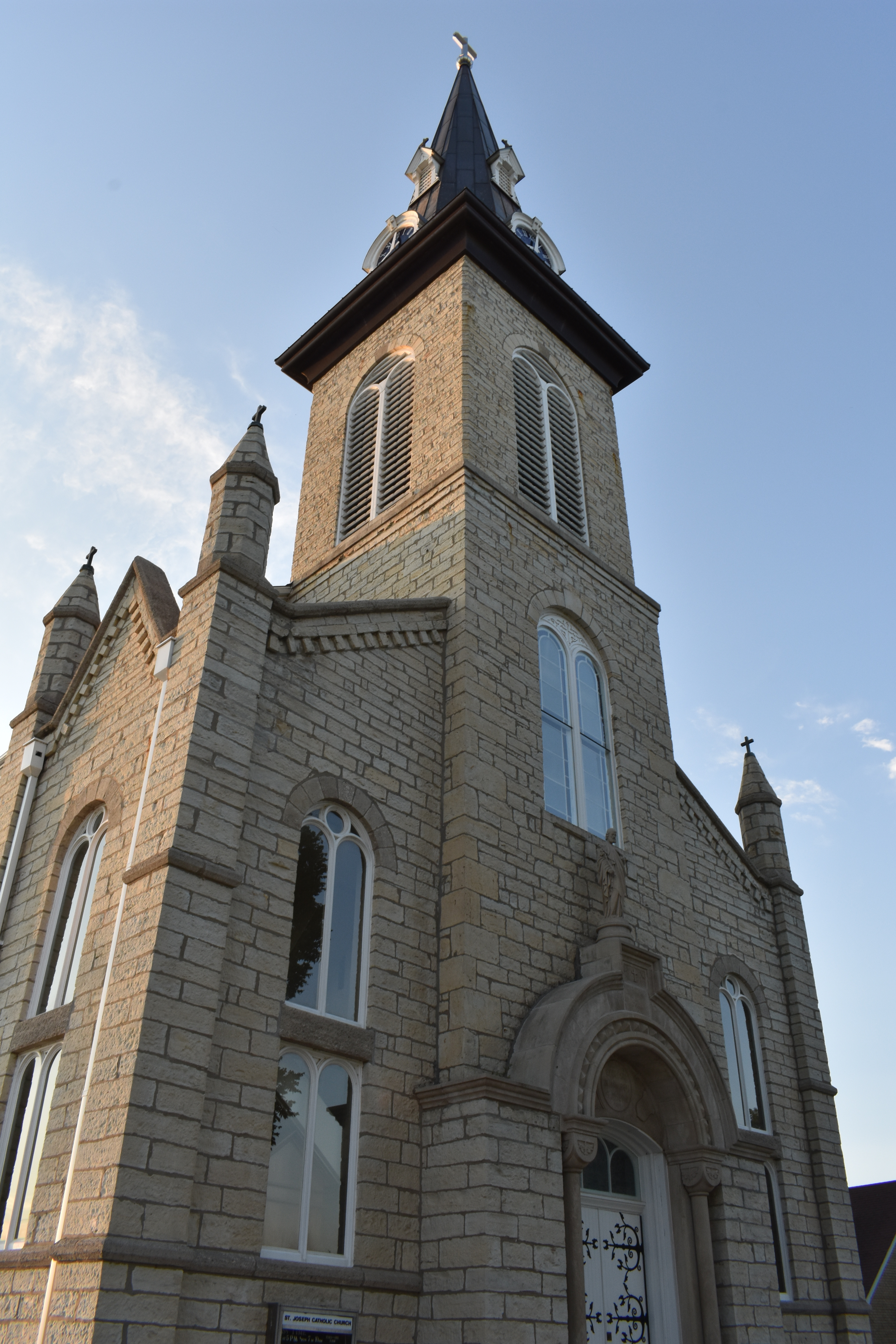
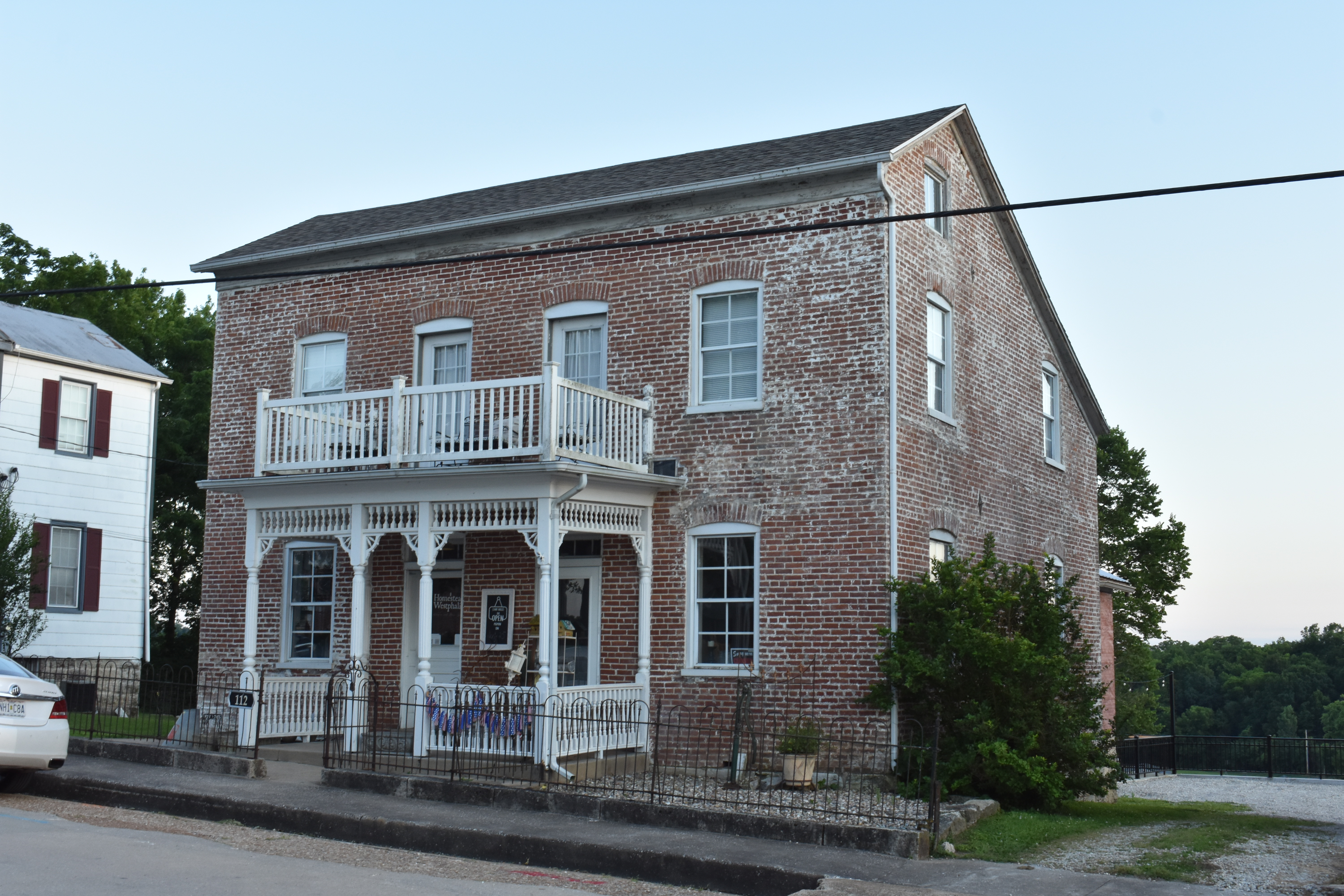
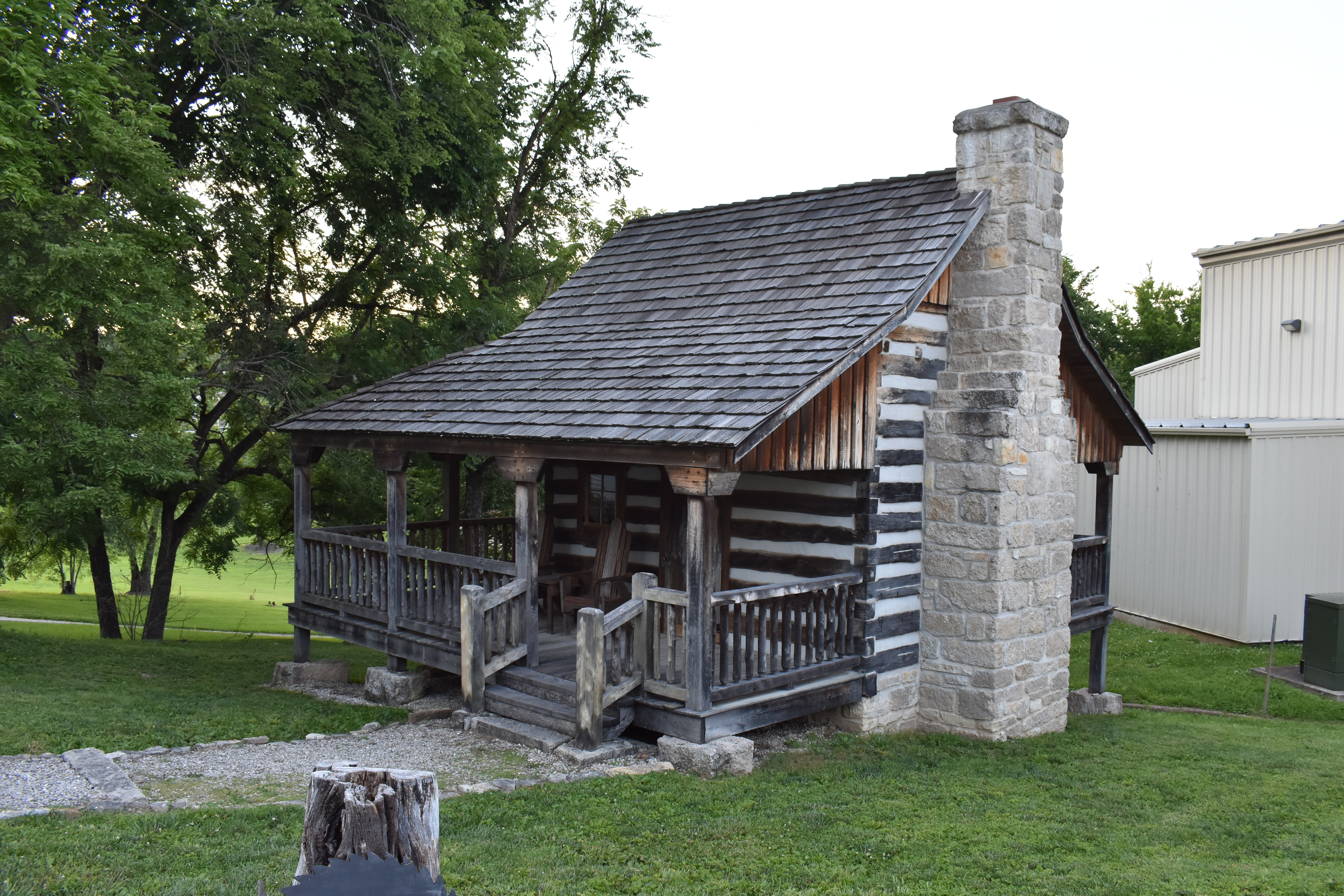
- Main Street St Joseph Catholic Church House in Westphalia Cabin in Westphalia
- Nickname: "The Pearl of Osage County"
- Location of Westphalia, Missouri
- Coordinates: 38°26′29″N 91°59′55″W
- Country: United States
- State: Missouri
- County: Osage
- Founded: 1835
- Incorporated: 1848
- Named for: Westphalia, Germany

Area
  - Total: 0.37 sq mi (0.97 km^{2})
  - Land: 0.37 sq mi (0.97 km^{2})
  - Water: 0 sq mi (0.00 km^{2})
- Elevation: 620 ft (190 m)

Population (2020)
  - Total: 378
  - Density: 1,013.9/sq mi (391.46/km^{2})
- Time zone: UTC-6 (Central (CST))
  - Summer (DST): UTC-5 (CDT)
- ZIP code: 65085
- Area code: 573
- FIPS code: 29-78910
- GNIS feature ID: 2397284
- U.S. Routes: U.S. Route 63 in Missouri
- Website: www.cityofwestphaliamo.com

Westphalia is a city in Osage County, Missouri, United States. The population was 378 at the 2020 census. It is part of the Jefferson City, Missouri Metropolitan Statistical Area.

Westphalia is heavily influenced by the German heritage of the majority of its inhabitants. Many of the early settlers of the area came from the Westphalia region of Germany, hence the name. Many buildings are influenced by nineteenth-century German architecture, and streets are labeled in both English and German. The center of population of Missouri is located in Westphalia.

== History ==
Westphalia was platted in 1835, and named after Westphalia, in Germany, the native home of a large share of the first settlers. A post office called Westphalia has been in operation since 1848.

St. Joseph Church was listed on the National Register of Historic Places in 1972.

== Geography ==
Westphalia is located on US Route 63 approximately 12 miles southeast of Jefferson City. The Maries River flows past the south and east sides of the site and the Osage River is two miles to the northwest.

According to the United States Census Bureau, the city has a total area of 0.53 square miles (1.37 km^{2}), all land.

== Demographics ==
Historical population
| Census | Pop. | Note | %± |
|---|---|---|---|
| 1910 | 321 | | — |
| 1920 | 234 | | −27.1% |
| 1930 | 432 | | 84.6% |
| 1940 | 374 | | −13.4% |
| 1950 | 319 | | −14.7% |
| 1960 | 316 | | −0.9% |
| 1970 | 332 | | 5.1% |
| 1980 | 285 | | −14.2% |
| 1990 | 287 | | 0.7% |
| 2000 | 320 | | 11.5% |
| 2010 | 389 | | 21.6% |
| 2020 | 378 | | −2.8% |
U.S. Decennial Census

=== 2010 census ===
As of the census of 2010, there were 389 people, 166 households, and 80 families living in the city. The population density was 734.0 inhabitants per square mile (283.4/km^{2}). There were 184 housing units at an average density of 347.2 per square mile (134.1/km^{2}). The racial makeup of the city was 97.7% White, 0.5% Asian, and 1.8% from two or more races. Hispanic or Latino of any race were 0.8% of the population.

There were 166 households, of which 19.9% had children under the age of 18 living with them, 39.8% were married couples living together, 7.8% had a female householder with no husband present, 0.6% had a male householder with no wife present, and 51.8% were non-families. 47.0% of all households were made up of individuals, and 22.9% had someone living alone who was 65 years of age or older. The average household size was 1.97 and the average family size was 2.90.

The median age in the city was 51.3 years. 16.5% of residents were under the age of 18; 8.1% were between the ages of 18 and 24; 14.4% were from 25 to 44; 23.1% were from 45 to 64; and 37.8% were 65 years of age or older. The gender makeup of the city was 44.5% male and 55.5% female.

=== 2000 census ===
As of the census of 2000, there were 320 people, 137 households, and 84 families living in the city. The population density was 631.9 inhabitants per square mile (244.0/km^{2}). There were 152 housing units at an average density of 300.1 per square mile (115.9/km^{2}). The racial makeup of the city was 97.81% White, 0.31% African American, and 1.88% from two or more races. Hispanic or Latino of any race were 0.62% of the population.

There were 137 households, out of which 30.7% had children under the age of 18 living with them, 47.4% were married couples living together, 12.4% had a female householder with no husband present, and 38.0% were non-families. 35.0% of all households were made up of individuals, and 18.2% had someone living alone who was 65 years of age or older. The average household size was 2.34 and the average family size was 3.02.

In the city, the population was spread out, with 25.9% under the age of 18, 7.5% from 18 to 24, 25.6% from 25 to 44, 18.4% from 45 to 64, and 22.5% who were 65 years of age or older. The median age was 39 years. For every 100 females, there were 93.9 males. For every 100 females age 18 and over, there were 82.3 males.

The median income for a household in the city was $35,833, and the median income for a family was $47,500. Males had a median income of $35,568 versus $22,500 for females. The per capita income for the city was $18,496. About 1.3% of families and 6.2% of the population were below the poverty line, including none of those under age 18 and 27.1% of those age 65 or over.

== Education ==
It is in the Osage County R-III School District.

== Notable person ==
- Joe Crede, former MLB third baseman for the Chicago White Sox and Minnesota Twins, and 2008 All Star, grew up in Westphalia.

== See also ==
- List of cities in Missouri
