= Bonnots Mill Historic District =

Historic district in Missouri, United States

- U.S. National Register of Historic Places
- U.S. Historic district
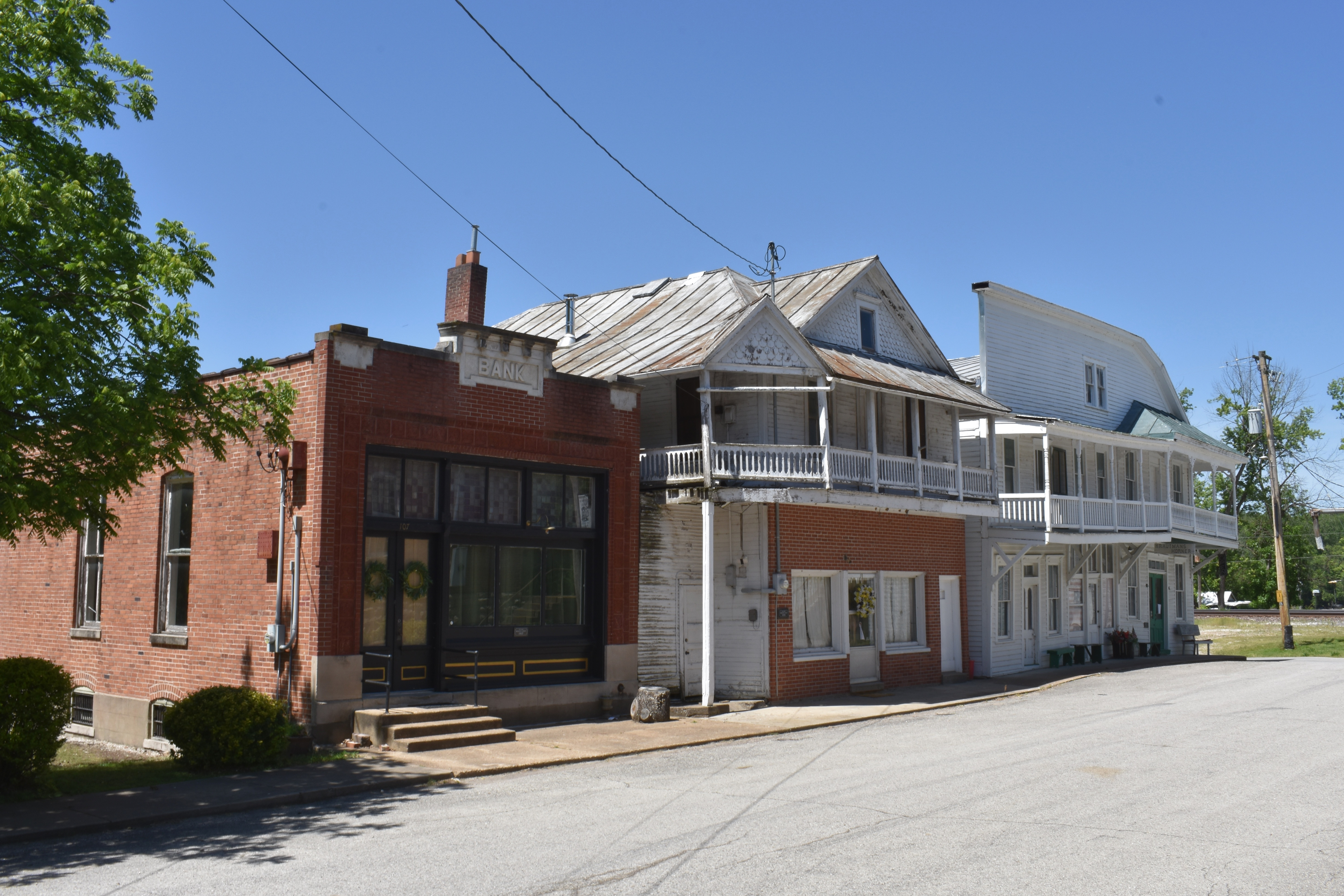
- Historic Buildings on Main Street

- Location within Missouri Location within the United States
- Location: Roughly Old Mill Rd., Riverside Dr., Highwater Rd., Iris Ave., Wildwood Ln., Hwy. A and Main, Short and Church Hill Sts., Bonnots Mill, Missouri
- Coordinates: 38°34′38″N 91°57′47″W
- Area: 48.5 acres (19.6 ha)
- Architectural style: Bungalow/craftsman, I-house
- NRHP reference No.: 92001738
- Added to NRHP: January 21, 1993

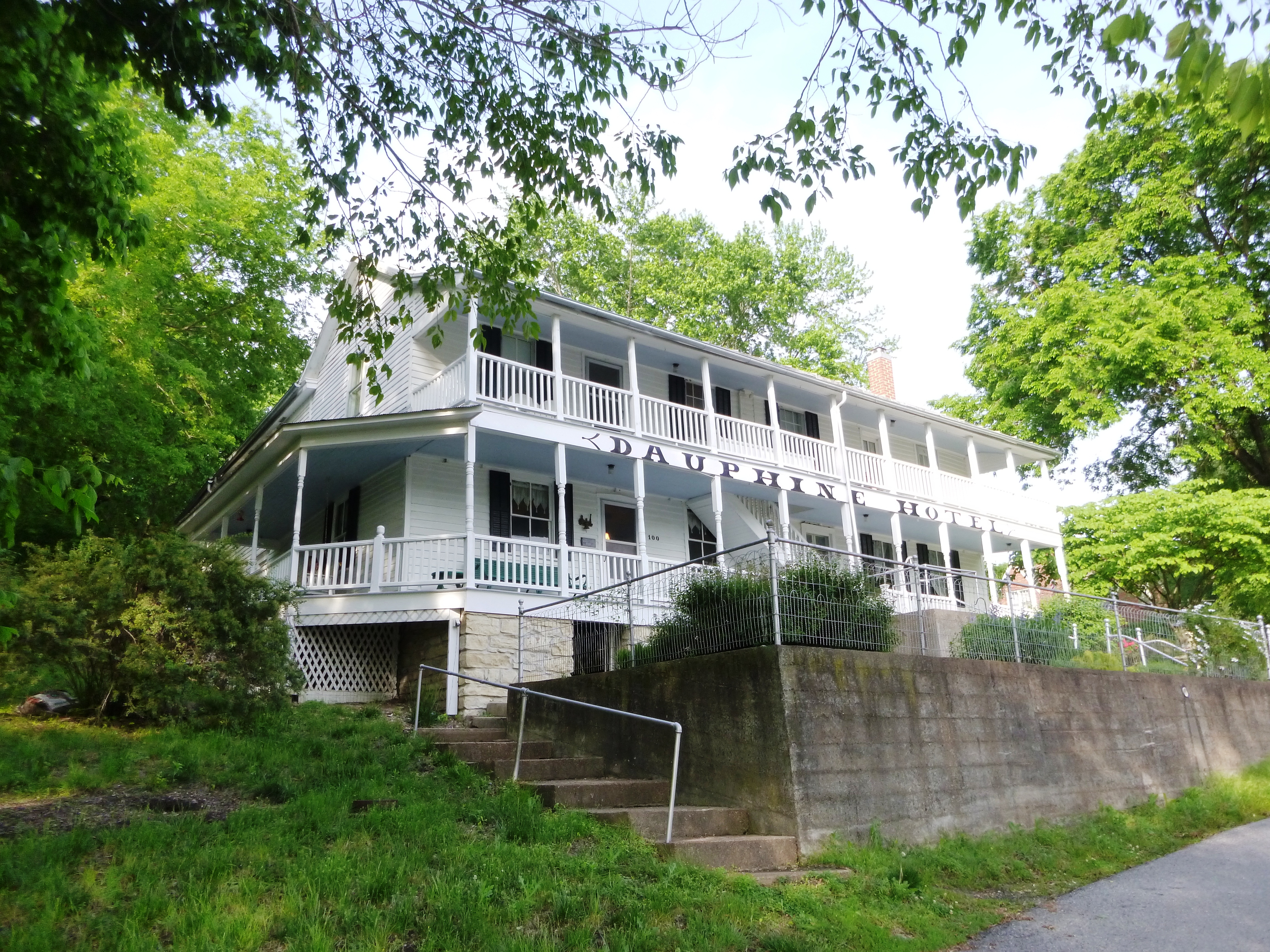
The Dauphine Hotel is an example of the style of architecture featured in the District.

Bonnots Mill Historic District is a national historic district located at Bonnots Mill, Osage County, Missouri. It encompasses 98 contributing buildings in the central business district and surrounding residential sections of Bonnots Mill. The district developed between about 1840 and 1942, and includes representative examples of Bungalow / American Craftsman and I-house architecture. Located in the district is the separately listed Dauphine Hotel. Other notable buildings include the Bonnots Mill School (1889), Henry Dieckriede House (c. 1885), Bonnots Mill United Methodist Church (1915), Bank of Bonnots Mill (1907), Bonnet's Mill Hotel / Krautman's Store (c. 1870), Meyer-Morfeld Milling Company (c. 1890), United States Post Office (c. 1910), St. Louis Parish Church and Rectory (1907), and St. Louis Parish School (c. 1916).

It was listed on the National Register of Historic Places in 1993.
