= Sacred Heart Catholic Church and Parsonage (Rich Fountain, Missouri) =

Historic church in Missouri, United States

- U.S. National Register of Historic Places
- Location within Missouri Location within the United States
- Location: Route U, Rich Fountain, Missouri
- Coordinates: 38°23′49″N 91°52′53″W
- Area: 2.7 acres (1.1 ha)
- Built: 1879, 1881
- Built by: Mr. Gosse
- Architectural style: Vernacular Gothic-German
- NRHP reference No.: 82003155
- Added to NRHP: September 9, 1982

Sacred Heart Catholic Church and Parsonage is a historic Roman Catholic church located on Route U in Rich Fountain in Osage County, Missouri. The church was built in 1879, and is a one-story, rectangular building constructed of cut- and squared buff-limestone rubble blocks. It measures approximately 45 feet by 140 feet and has a gabled, red tile roof installed in 1925. The church displays vernacular Gothic Revival and Romanesque Revival design elements. It features a bell and clock tower with its slate-shingled cone steeple, gabled vent dormers and Vendramini windows at cardinal points. The associated parsonage was built in 1881, and is a limestone rubble block building with segmental arched windows.

It was listed on the National Register of Historic Places in 1982.
