= National Register of Historic Places listings in Texas County, Missouri =

Location of Texas County in Missouri

This is a list of the National Register of Historic Places listings in Texas County, Missouri.

This is intended to be a complete list of the properties and districts on the National Register of Historic Places in Texas County, Missouri, United States. Latitude and longitude coordinates are provided for many National Register properties and districts; these locations may be seen together in a map.

There are 5 properties and districts listed on the National Register in the county.

This National Park Service list is complete through NPS recent listings posted March 14, 2025.

== Current listings ==
	Name on the Register	Image	Date listed	Location	City or town	Description
1	Bates-Geers House	Bates-Geers House	September 23, 1982 (#82003159)	East of Plata on Slabtown Rd. 37°32′54″N 92°06′42″W	Plato	
2	Arthur W. and Chloe B. Cole House		December 10, 1998 (#98001500)	5803 Rocky Branch Rd. 37°15′42″N 92°01′58″W	Houston	
3	Houston High School		February 12, 2009 (#09000016)	423 W. Pine; 37°19′43″N 91°57′35″W	Houston	
4	Houston Ranger Station Historic District		August 4, 2003 (#03000713)	104 Route 63, S. 37°19′17″N 91°57′22″W	Houston	
5	White Rock Bluffs Archeological Pictograph Site		May 21, 1969 (#69000126)	Address Restricted	Bucyrus	

== See also ==
- List of National Historic Landmarks in Missouri
- National Register of Historic Places listings in Missouri
