= U.S. Route 63 in Missouri =

Section of U.S. Highway in Missouri, United States

U.S. Route 63
- US 63 highlighted in red

Route information
- Maintained by MoDOT
- Length: 337.748 mi (543.553 km)
- Existed: 1926–present

Major junctions
- South end: US 63 at the Arkansas state line in Thayer
- US 160 in West Plains; US 60 from Willow Springs to southeast of Cabool; I-44 in Rolla; US 50 in Westphalia; US 50 / US 54 in Jefferson City; US 24 in Moberly; US 36 / Route 110 (CKC) in Macon; US 136 from south-southeast of Glenwood to Lancaster
- North end: US 63 at the Iowa state line near Lancaster

Location
- Country: United States
- State: Missouri
- Counties: Oregon, Howell, Texas, Phelps, Maries, Osage, Cole, Callaway, Boone, Randolph, Macon, Adair, Schuyler

Highway system
- United States Numbered Highway System; List; Special; Divided; Missouri State Highway System; Interstate; US; State; Supplemental
← US 62	→ I-64

U.S. Route 63 (US 63) is the portion of a north-south highway that runs through the U.S. state of Missouri from the Arkansas state line near Thayer to the Iowa state line near Lancaster.

== Route description ==
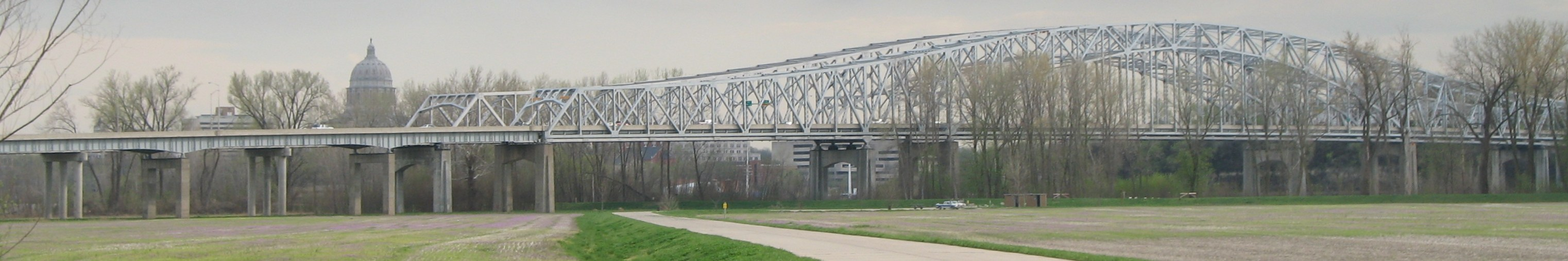
Senator Roy Blunt Bridge

The highway passes south-to-north through Missouri, from Arkansas to Iowa, serving cities such as Rolla, Jefferson City, Columbia, Moberly, Macon, and Kirksville. Notable routes that are intersected include U.S. Route 160 and U.S. Route 60 in Howell County, Interstate 44 at Rolla, U.S. Route 50 (which it shares a concurrency with into Jefferson City south of the Missouri River until it reaches the junction with U.S. 54), US Route 54 (which it overlaps in Jefferson City from the junction with U.S. Route 50 and crosses the Missouri River with on the Senator Roy Blunt Bridge), U.S. Route 24 at Moberly, U.S. Route 36 at Macon, and U.S. Route 136 at Lancaster.

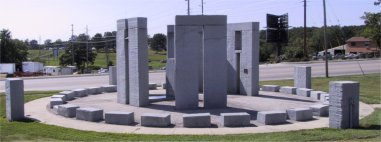
Stonehenge next to U.S. Route 63

The road enters the state (passing the Oregon County line) at Thayer. Immediately after leaving Thayer, U.S. 63 intersects Route 19, then continues into Howell County on a two-lane highway with alternating passing lanes, then the highway enters West Plains. The highway then widens to a four-lane divided highway, bypassing West Plains to the south and west, intersecting U.S. Route 160 then continues on a divided highway to Willow Springs. The route then joins US Route 60, and the two highways run concurrently northwest to Cabool.

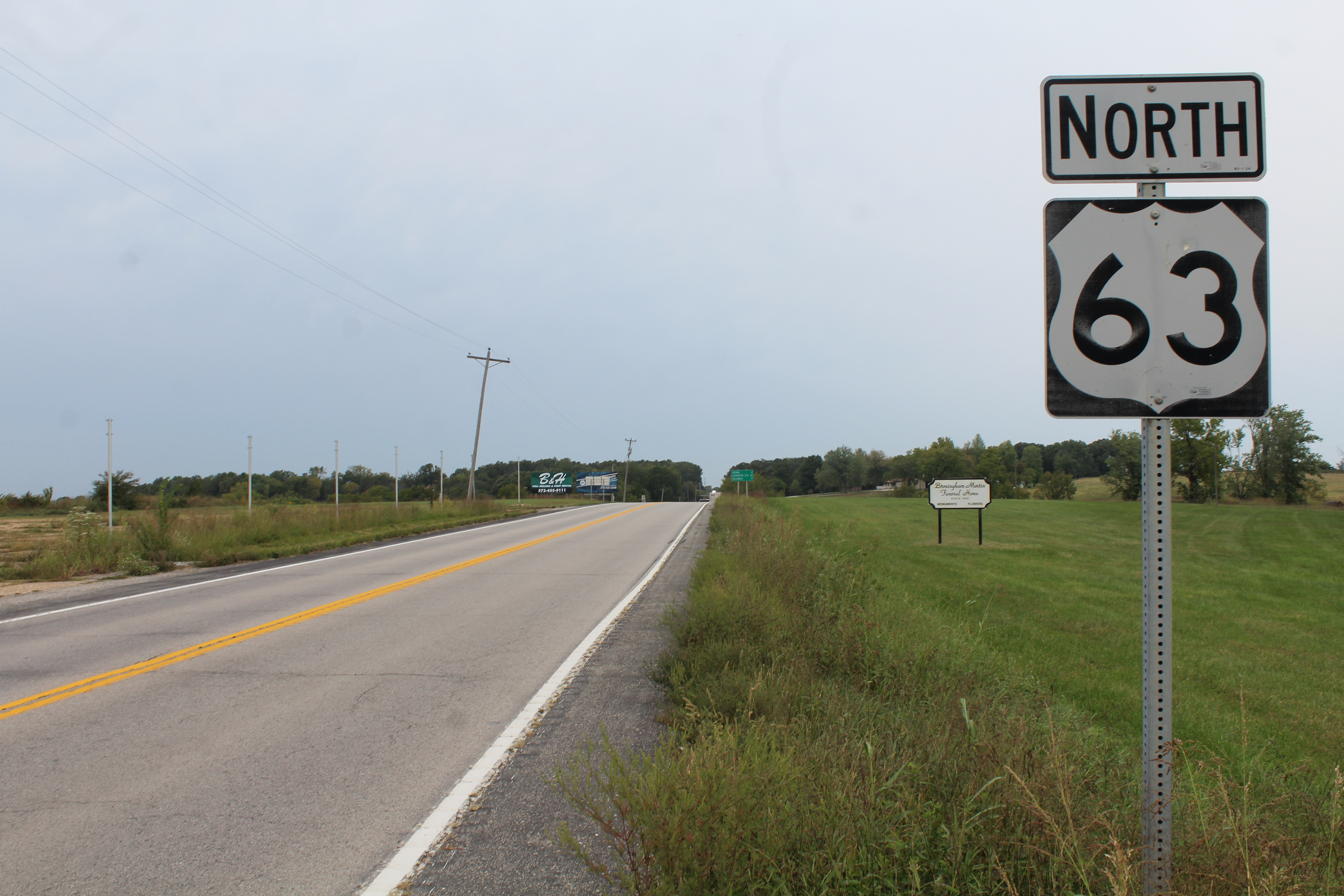
US 63 south of Vienna

North of Cabool, the highway returns to two-lane status (with alternating passing lanes), passing through Houston and intersecting Route 32 in Licking. The highway then enters Phelps County and passes through Rolla, the home of Missouri University of Science and Technology, and becomes locally known as Bishop Avenue. In Rolla, Route 63 intersects Route 72, and later, Business Loop 44. The Business Loop runs concurrently with Route 63 past the University's campus to Interstate 44, where the Business Loop ends. As it leaves Rolla, the highway quickly narrows to two lanes. US 63 between Rolla and US 50 is being studied for improvements. It crosses into Maries County toward Vienna, intersecting Highway 42. After entering Osage County, Route 63 passes through Freeburg and Westphalia. A few miles north of Westphalia, Highway 63 widens to a four-lane divided highway, and almost immediately intersects US Route 50, and the two highways head west toward Jefferson City, the state capital. After passing through downtown on the Whitton Expressway, the route leaves Route 50, joining the eastbound direction of US Route 54 to cross the Missouri River into Callaway County.

After crossing the river, Route 63 exits Route 54, and heads north on a four-lane divided highway. About five miles north of US 54, the highway enters Boone County, then after five miles more, leaves the Ozark Plateau and enters the Columbia metropolitan area. Highway 63 passes through the eastern edge of Ashland then passes along the eastern edge of Columbia, but gains freeway status for about 10 miles (16 km) through town. In the north part of town, US 63 intersects Interstate 70. There is no direct connection between US 63 and I-70; access to and from the Interstate is via an at-grade connector road, which intersects I-70 at a simple Diamond interchange. The route then leaves Columbia, returning to expressway status, and intersects Route 22 near Clark, right on the Boone-Randolph county line. After passing by Clark proper, U.S. 63 gains a Business Route, which passes through the otherwise-bypassed town of Renick, then passes through the city of Moberly. Mainline Route 63, meanwhile, upgrades to a freeway for about four miles as it passes through Moberly, intersecting US Route 24 at an interchange on the northern end of town.

Heading north, U.S. 63 leaves the Columbia metropolitan area and enters Macon County just north of Jacksonville, and heads toward the city of Macon. Through town, the highway narrows to a two-lane city street, with a center left-turn lane. Near the northern edge of town, US 63 intersects US Route 36, which is part of the Chicago-Kansas City Expressway. Leaving Macon, the highway re-gains expressway status, and passes by La Plata before crossing into Adair County. South of Kirksville, the route interchanges with a Business Route, which passes through the city proper, while mainline Route 63 narrows to two lanes and enters a newly-constructed bypass to the east of town. While on the bypass, the highway intersects Route 6 and Missouri Route 11, and the two east-west state routes form a three-mile long Wrong-way concurrency with each other following US 63. Leaving the Kirksville bypass, US 63 returns to a two-lane surface highway, and enters Schuyler County. Near Lancaster, the highway intersects US Route 136, which briefly overlaps with Route 63 into Lancaster itself. There, Route 136 turns east, while Route 63 continues north into Iowa, exiting Missouri about five miles north of Lancaster.

== History ==
U.S. 63 in Missouri was Route 7 from 1922 to 1926.

== Junction list ==
All exits are unnumbered.

County	Location	mi	km	Destinations	Notes
Oregon		0.000	0.000	US 63 south – Mammoth Spring	Continuation into Arkansas
Oregon	Thayer	1.202	1.934	Route 142 / US 63 Bus. – Lanton	Southern terminus of Route 142 concurrency. Access to Grand Gulf State Park.
Oregon	Thayer	1.823	2.934	Route 142 east – Doniphan	Northern terminus of Route 142 concurrency
Oregon	Thayer	3.229	5.197	Route 19 / US 63 Bus. – Alton, Thayer	Access to Grand Gulf State Park and Business District.
Oregon		4.514	7.265	Route OO	
Oregon	Koshkonong	10.301	16.578	Route F	Access to Cover Prairie Conservation Area
Oregon		11.064	17.806	Route Z	Access to Warm Fork Conservation Area
Oregon		11.586	18.646	Route M – Rover	
Howell		22.173	35.684	Route PP	Access to Cover Prairie Conservation Area
Howell	West Plains	24.432	39.319	Route ZZ	
Howell	West Plains	24.910	40.089	US 63 Bus. (Bill Virdon Blvd.) – West Plains	
Howell	West Plains	25.994	41.833	Route 17 – Lanton	Southern terminus of Route 17 concurrency
Howell	West Plains	27.219	43.805	US 160 west – Gainesville	Southern terminus of US 160 concurrency. Access to Bull Shoals Lake and Norfork Lake.
Howell	West Plains	27.880	44.869	Route K – Pottersville	
Howell	West Plains	29.048	46.748	US 160 / Route 17 / Route CC – Hammond Camp	Northern terminus of US 160 / Route 17 concurrency. Access to Ozarks Medical Center.
Howell	West Plains	29.850	48.039	US 63 Bus. – West Plains	Interchange
Howell	West Plains	33.154	53.356	Route 14 – Ava	
Howell	Pomona	38.360	61.734	Route N / Route P	Access to West Plains Regional Airport
Howell		42.380	68.204	Route UU – Burnham	
Howell	Willow Springs	45.514	73.248	US 60 east – Mountain View, Poplar Bluff	Interchange; southern end of freeway; southern terminus of US 60 concurrency
Howell	Willow Springs	46.433	74.727	US 60 Bus. / US 63 Bus. – Willow Springs	
Howell	Willow Springs	48.508	78.066	Route 76 west / Route 137 north – Willow Springs	
Howell	Willow Springs	50.739	81.657	US 60 Bus. / US 63 Bus. – Willow Springs	Interchange; northern end of freeway. Access to Missouri State Highway Patrol Troop G Headquarters.
Texas	Cabool	59.410	95.611	US 60 west – Mountain Grove, Springfield	Northern terminus of US 60 concurrency; southern terminus of US 60 Bus. concurrency
Texas	Cabool	60.953	98.094	US 60 Bus.	Northern terminus of US 60 Bus. concurrency. Access to Business District.
Texas		62.107	99.952	Route PP	
Texas		66.078	106.342	Route H – Elk Creek	
Texas	Simmons	69.933	112.546	Route Z	
Texas		71.152	114.508	Route UU – Solo	
Texas	Houston	76.940	123.823	Route 17 – Summersville	Southern terminus of Route 17 concurrency; access to Texas County Memorial Hospital and Ozark National Scenic Riverways.
Texas	Houston	77.141	124.146	Route 17 – Success, Fort Leonard Wood	Northern terminus of Route 17 concurrency
Texas	Houston	77.888	125.349	Route B / Route F – Raymondville	
Texas		80.557	129.644	Route E	
Texas		88.093	141.772	Route P to Route 137 / Route BB	
Texas	Licking	91.392	147.081	Route 32 to Route 137 – Success, Salem	Access to South Central Correctional Center
Texas	Sherrill	97.289	156.571	Route CC – Sherrill, Maples	Access to White River Trace Conservation Area
Phelps		100.465	161.683	Route K – Beulah	
Phelps	Edgar Springs	105.142	169.210	Route H – Lenox, Salem	
Phelps	Edgar Springs	105.969	170.541	Route M / Route FF – Flat, Edgar Springs	
Phelps		117.948	189.819	Route W	
Phelps	Rolla	124.465	200.307	Route 72 (Ridgeway Road) – Salem	
Phelps	Rolla	124.860	200.943	I-44 BL (Kingshighway)	Southern terminus of BL I-44 concurrency
Phelps	Rolla	125.093	201.318	Route BB (10th Street) – Saint James	
Phelps	Rolla	125.345	201.723	Route E (University Drive) to I-44 – Gasconade River	Access to Missouri University of Science and Technology
Phelps	Rolla	126.161	203.036	I-44 – Springfield, Saint Louis	I-44 exit 186; Eastern terminus of BL I-44
Maries		134.218	216.003	Route P to Route 68	
Maries	Vichy	137.315	220.987	Route 68 – Saint James	
Maries	Vichy	138.081	222.220	Route FF	
Maries	Vichy	138.587	223.034	Route 28 – Belle	Southern terminus of Route 28 concurrency. Access to Rolla National Airport
Maries		142.879	229.941	Route A	
Maries		147.596	237.533	Route 28 – Dixon, Fort Leonard Wood	Northern terminus of Route 28 concurrency
Maries		147.975	238.143	Route 28 Spur to Route 28 west – Dixon, Fort Leonard Wood	
Maries	Vienna	150.246	241.797	Route 42 – Iberia, Belle, Lake of the Ozarks	
Maries	Vienna	151.122	243.207	Route AA – Argyle	
Osage	Freeburg	160.516	258.325	Route P – Koeltztown	
Osage		166.109	267.327	Route E – Rich Fountain	
Osage		168.790	271.641	Route T – Koeltztown	
Osage	Westphalia	172.454	277.538	Route 133 – Meta	
Osage		175.420– 175.625	282.311– 282.641	US 50 east – Saint Louis	Southern terminus of US 50 concurrency
Cole	Schubert	178.755	287.678	Route M / Route J – Taos, Osage City	Access to Clark's Hill/Norton State Historic Site
Cole	Jefferson City	180.576	290.609	Militia Drive	Access to the Missouri National Guard Armory and the Missouri Military Museum
Cole	Jefferson City	183.088	294.652	McCarty Street	
Cole	Jefferson City	184.721	297.280	Eastland Drive	
Cole	Jefferson City	185.875	299.137	Clark Avenue	Access to Missouri State Highway Patrol General Headquarters
Cole	Jefferson City	186.367	299.929	Lafayette Street	Access to Lincoln University
Cole	Jefferson City	187.388	301.572	US 50 Bus. west (Missouri Boulevard) to US 54 west – Lake of the Ozarks	At-grade intersection; eastern end of freeway; eastern terminus of US 50 Bus.
Cole	Jefferson City	187.476– 187.749	301.713– 302.153	US 54 west / US 50 west – Eldon, Lake of the Ozarks, Sedalia	Northern terminus of US 50 concurrency; southern terminus of US 54 concurrency
Missouri River		187.952– 188.081	302.479– 302.687	Senator Roy Blunt Bridge	
Callaway	Jefferson City	188.713	303.704	Route W	Access to Jefferson City Memorial Airport
Callaway	Jefferson City	189.176– 189.493	304.449– 304.959	US 54 east / Route 94 – Fulton, Mokane, Jefferson City	Northern terminus of US 54 concurrency
Boone		200.701	322.997	Route A – Hartsburg	
Boone	Ashland	203.706	327.833	Route M / Route Y – Ashland, Guthrie	Interchange
Boone	Elkhurst	207.716	334.286	Route 163 / Route H	Interchange; access to Columbia Regional Airport and Rock Bridge Memorial State Park
Boone	Columbia	212.874	342.587	Discovery Parkway	Interchange; southern end of freeway; access to Missouri Department of Conservation Central Regional Office and Resource Science Center
Boone	Columbia	214.168	344.670	Route AC (Grindstone Parkway) / East New Haven Road	
Boone	Columbia	215.486	346.791	Route 740 (Stadium Boulevard)	Access to the University of Missouri, University Hospital, and Harry S. Truman Memorial Veterans' Hospital
Boone	Columbia	216.486	348.400	Route WW / Broadway Street	Access to Downtown Columbia, Boone Hospital Center, University of Missouri Women's and Children's Hospital, and Little Dixie Lake Conservation Area
Boone	Columbia	217.022– 218.352	349.263– 351.403	To I-70 / US 40 / Route PP – Kansas City, Saint Louis	
Boone	Columbia	218.836	352.182	Vandiver Drive / Bass Pro Drive	
Boone	Columbia	219.745	353.645	Route B – Hallsville, Centralia	
Boone	Columbia	220.214	354.400	Brown School Road / Oakland Gravel Road	
Boone	Columbia	221.958	357.207	Prathersville Road	
Boone	Prathersville	223.245	359.278	Route 763 south – Columbia	Interchange; northern end of freeway; southbound exit and northbound entrance
Boone		229.814	369.850	Route 124 east – Hallsville	Southern terminus of Route 124 concurrency
Boone		230.645	371.187	Route 124 west – Harrisburg	Northern terminus of Route 124 concurrency
Boone		235.038	378.257	Route NN	
Boone		237.090	381.559	Route CC – Sturgeon	
Boone–Randolph county line	Sturgeon	238.559	383.923	Route 22 / Route F – Centralia, Sturgeon	Interchange
Randolph	Clark	241.224	388.212	Route B / Route P – Higbee, Clark	
Randolph		246.386	396.520	US 63 Bus. / Route NN – Renick, Moberly	
Randolph	Moberly	250.225	402.698	Route M – Moberly, Middle Grove	Interchange
Randolph	Moberly	251.825	405.273	Route EE (Rollins Street)	Interchange; access to Moberly Regional Medical Center, Downtown Moberly, and Moberly Area Community College
Randolph	Moberly	253.861	408.550	US 24 – Moberly	Interchange; access to Moberly Regional Medical Center
Randolph	Moberly	254.863	410.162	US 63 Bus. (Morley Street)	Interchange; access to Omar N. Bradley Airport - MBY
Randolph	Cairo	258.674	416.295	Route K / Route Z	
Randolph	Jacksonville	264.109	425.042	Route J – Duncans Bridge	
Macon	Excello	267.828	431.027	Route T / Route Y – College Mound	
Macon	Macon	273.817	440.666	Route PP	Access to Macon-Fowler International Airport
Macon	Macon	275.902	444.021	US 36 Bus.	Access to Samaritan Hospital
Macon	Macon	276.045– 276.057	444.251– 444.271	Future I-72 / US 36 / Route 110 (CKC) – Saint Joseph, Hannibal	Interchange
Macon		279.643	450.042	Route DD – Ten Mile	
Macon	Atlanta	285.319	459.176	Route M – Economy	
Macon		287.842	463.237	Route J – Elmer	
Macon		292.375	470.532	Route NN	
Macon	La Plata	295.028	474.802	Route 156 – South Gifford, Novelty	
Adair		298.319	480.098	Route E – Wilson	
Adair	Millard	302.056	486.112	Route KK	Access to Kirksville Regional Airport
Adair	Kirksville	304.438– 304.933	489.945– 490.742	US 63 Bus. north (South Baltimore Street)	Interchange; northbound exit and southbound entrance
Adair	Kirksville	307.140	494.294	Route 6 / Route 11 – Edina, Brookfield	Southern terminus of Route 6 / Route 11 concurrency
Adair	Kirksville	309.136	497.506	Route 6 / Route 11 – Milan, Baring	Northern terminus of Route 6 / Route 11 concurrency
Adair	Kirksville	312.432	502.811	US 63 Bus. south (North Baltimore Street)	Interchange
Adair		314.788	506.602	Route T – Sperry	
Adair		318.981	513.350	Route A – Downing	
Schuyler	Greentop	320.179	515.278	Route K	
Schuyler	Queen City	324.035	521.484	Route E / Route W – Worthington	
Schuyler	Queen City	325.112	523.217	Route O	
Schuyler		327.583	527.194	Route P / Route U – Lancaster	
Schuyler		330.468	531.837	US 136 – Unionville	Southern terminus of US 136 concurrency
Schuyler	Lancaster	332.587	535.247	US 136 / Route 202 – Glenwood, Keokuk	Northern terminus of US 136 concurrency
Schuyler		337.748	543.553	US 63 north – Bloomfield	Continuation into Iowa
1.000 mi = 1.609 km; 1.000 km = 0.621 mi: Concurrency terminus; Incomplete access

U.S. Route 63
Previous state: Arkansas	Missouri	Next state: Iowa
