= Arthur Creek =

Stream in Missouri, U.S.

Arthur Creek is a stream in the Texas County, Missouri. It is a tributary of the Big Piney River. The stream headwaters arise west of Missouri Route 137 between Yukon and Raymondville. It flows northwest under U. S. Route 63 northeast of Houston and on to its confluence with the Big Piney southwest of Prescott.

The stream source is at 37°18′31″N 91°52′41″W and the confluence is at 37°25′47″N 91°56′48″W.

Arthur Creek has the name of George H. Arthur, a pioneer citizen.

== See also ==
- List of rivers of Missouri
