= Pierce Township, Texas County, Missouri =

Township in the U.S. state of Missouri

Coordinates: 37.0928°N 91.8428°W

Pierce Township is a township in Texas County, in the U.S. state of Missouri.

Pierce Township was first called "Jack's Fork Township", and under the latter name was established in 1852, and named after the creek of the same name within its borders. The present name, adopted in 1854, honors J. W. Pierce, a pioneer citizen. The unincorporated communities of Clear Springs, Guild, Hattie, Louisa and Malone are or were located within Pierce Township.
