= Grogan, Missouri =

Extinct town in Missouri, U.S.

Coordinates: 37°09′17″N 91°53′11″W

Grogan is an extinct town in southern Texas County, in the U.S. state of Missouri. The GNIS classifies it as a populated place.

The community is on a hillside above the North Prong of Jacks Fork River. The town is approximately eleven miles east-northeast of Cabool and eleven miles south-southeast of Houston.

A post office called Grogan was established in 1897, and remained in operation until 1954. The community has the name of J. E. Grogan (John Emerson Grogan), the original owner of the town site.
