= Earl Sponsler =

American politician

Member of the U.S. House of Representatives from Missouri's 126th, 151st district

Missouri House of Representatives

Personal details
- Born: 1913 farm near Bado, Missouri
- Died: 2005 (aged 91–92) Cabool, Missouri
- Resting place: Bado Cemetery in Texas County, Missouri
- Party: Democratic
- Spouse: Lois Vivian Flowers 1934-1992, Stella Boyer 1993-2005
- Children: 2 (son and daughter)
- Occupation: livestock farmer

Earl Lee Sponsler (April 13, 1913 - March 12, 2005) was a Democratic politician who served in the Missouri House of Representatives around the 1960s. He was born in Texas County, Missouri, and was educated in Texas County rural schools, Mountain Grove High School, and Southwest Missouri State University. On July 8, 1934, he married Lois Flowers in Houston, Missouri. After his first wife died in 1992, he married Stella Boyer, the widow of his younger brother, in 1993.
