= Alice, Missouri =

Unincorporated community in Missouri, U.S.

Coordinates: 37°17′54″N 92°11′20″W

Alice is an unincorporated community in southwest Texas County, in the U.S. state of Missouri.

The community was located on a high ridge above and north of West Piney Creek on Missouri Route 38, approximately one mile east of Bendavis and 1.5 miles west of Fairview. The Alice school was just east of the community.

== History ==
A post office called Alice was established in 1886, and remained in operation until 1927. The community has the name of Alice Embree, a pioneer citizen.

In 1925, Alice had 32 inhabitants.
