= Mahan, Missouri =

Unincorporated community in Missouri, U.S.

Coordinates: 37°24′13″N 91°49′38″W

Mahan is an unincorporated community in Texas County, in the U.S. state of Missouri. The community was located on Missouri Route 137 and Missouri Route V, approximately one mile south of Oscar and four miles north of Raymondville. It is at an elevation of 1,309 ft (399 m). The Mahan Cemetery lies about one mile east on Route V.

== History ==
A post office called Mahan was established in 1903, and remained in operation until 1912. An early postmaster gave the community the name of her husband, Sam Mahan.
