= Gravel Point, Missouri =

Extinct town in the American state of Missouri

Coordinates: 37°13′29″N 92°10′05″W

Gravel Point is an extinct town in southwestern Texas County, in the U.S. state of Missouri. The community and Gravel Point School is on Gravel Point Road and adjacent to a small tributary of West Piney Creek. It was approximately eight miles north-northwest of Cabool.

A post office called Gravel Point was established in 1871, the name was changed to Gravelpoint in 1895, and the post office closed in 1905. The community was so named on account of gravel deposits near the original town site.
