= Varvol, Missouri =

Unincorporated community in Missouri, U.S.

Coordinates: 37°05′50″N 91°57′40″W

Varvol is an unincorporated community in southern Texas County, in the U.S. state of Missouri. The community is on the South Prong of Jacks Fork at the intersection of Missouri Route HH and Varvel Road. The community of Sargent is approximately 3.5 miles to the west on Varvel Road and Willow Springs in adjacent Howell County is about seven miles south on route HH and Missouri Route 137. Varvel School was about three miles east along the north bank of the river.

== History ==
A variant name was "Varvel". A post office called Varvel was established in 1891, and remained in operation until 1909. The community has the name of the Varvol family, proprietors of a local country store.
