= West Piney Creek =

Stream in the U.S. state of Missouri

West Piney Creek also known as the Little Piney River is a stream in Texas County in the Ozarks of south central Missouri. It is a tributary to the Big Piney River.

The stream headwaters arise at 37°11′12″N 92°10′22″W at an elevation of 1460 feet approximately four miles northwest of Cabool. The stream flows generally to the northeast past the communities of Bado and Clara to its confluence with the Big Piney River two miles west of Houston at 37°19′38″N 92°00′22″W and an elevation of 997 feet. The confluence is within the Piney River Narrows State Natural Area.

The stream was named "West Piney" due to the fact that it enters the west side of the Big Piney.
