= Upton Township, Texas County, Missouri =

Township in the US state of Missouri

Coordinates: 37.4061°N 92.1669°W

Upton Township is a township in Texas County, in the U.S. state of Missouri.

Upton Township was erected in 1852, taking its name from Osias Upton, who at the time was active local politics. The unincorporated communities of Upton and Success are located in the township.
