= Samoa, Missouri =

Unincorporated community in Missouri, U.S.

Coordinates: 37°16′28″N 91°54′46″W

Samoa is an unincorporated community in Texas County, in the U.S. state of Missouri.

The community was located approximately three miles west of Yukon near Missouri Route 17, on the north bank of Indian Creek. The Ozark Church and cemetery lie just southeast of the location. Houston is about four miles to the northwest.

== History ==
A post office called Samoa was established in 1890, and remained in operation until 1909. The community was named after the island nation of Samoa.
