= Kimble, Missouri =

Unincorporated community in Missouri, U.S.

Coordinates: 37°34′37″N 91°50′29″W

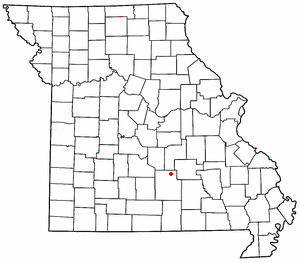

Kimble is an unincorporated community in northeastern Texas County, Missouri, United States. It is located just east of U.S. Route 63, approximately six miles north of Licking.

A post office called Kimble was established in 1897, and remained in operation until 1967. The community has the name of C. H. Kimble, a local merchant.
