= Sherrill, Missouri =

Unincorporated community in Missouri, U.S.

Coordinates: 37°35′19″N 91°52′35″W

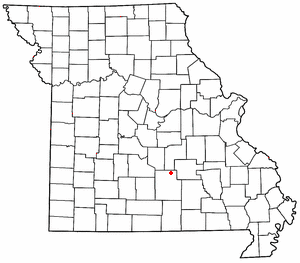

Sherrill is an unincorporated community in northern Texas County, Missouri, United States. It is located approximately six miles north of Licking and is located just west of U.S. Route 63. Sherrill Creek flows past the north side of the community. The community of Beulah lies about 2.5 miles northwest on Sherrill Creek in Phelps County.

A post office called Sherrill was established in 1873, and remained in operation until 1969. The community takes its name from Sherrill Township.
