= Ellsworth, Missouri =

Unincorporated community in Missouri, U.S.

Coordinates: 37°27′11″N 92°00′42″W

Ellsworth is an unincorporated community in the Township Of Lynch in Texas County, in the U.S. state of Missouri.

== History ==
A post office called Ellsworth was established in 1846, and remained in service until 1876. The town community is named in honour of Mr. Ellsworth, a local merchant who often visited the town.

== Neighbouring towns ==
The closest towns to Ellsworth are Licking, Missouri, which is 9.1 miles away, Houston, Missouri, which is 9.3 miles away and Plato, Missouri, which is 12.2 miles away.
