= Indian Creek (Big Piney River tributary) =

Stream in the US state of Missouri

Location
- Country: United States
- State: Missouri
- Region: Texas County

Physical characteristics
- Source
  - location: Texas County, Missouri
  - coordinates: 37°17′02″N 91°53′18″W
- Mouth
  - location: Texas County, Missouri
  - coordinates: 37°18′34″N 91°59′52″W
  - elevation: 311 m (1,020 ft)

Indian Creek is a stream in Texas County, Missouri. It is a tributary of the Big Piney River.

The stream source is south of Missouri Route 17 west of Yukon. It flows west-northwest passing under U. S. Route 63 south of Houston and enters the Big Piney southwest of Houston.

Indian Creek took its name from an old Shawnee Indian settlement near its course.

== See also ==
- List of rivers of Missouri
