= Venable, Missouri =

Unincorporated community in Missouri, U.S.

Coordinates: 37°24′22″N 91°59′40″W

Venable is an unincorporated community in northwest Texas County, in the U.S. state of Missouri.

The community is on a ridge at the east end of Missouri Route AA and Ellis Prairie is approximately 2.5 miles west on Route AA. The old Venable School was about three-quarters of a mile to the north-northeast. It is about six miles north-northwest of Houston. The Big Piney River is about two miles to the east.

== History ==
A post office called Venable was established in 1891, and remained in operation until 1920. The community has the name of P. S. Venable, an early citizen.
