= Big Creek, Missouri =

Unincorporated community in Missouri, U.S.

Coordinates: 37°14′08″N 91°50′40″W

Big Creek is an unincorporated community in Texas County, in the U.S. state of Missouri. The community was located along Big Creek, approximately 2.5 miles south of Yukon and one-half mile east of Missouri Route 137. The Big Creek school was south of the creek and the Big Creek church was about one-half mile north along a county road.

== History ==
A post office called Big Creek was established in 1867, and remained in operation until 1909. The community takes its name from nearby Big Creek.
