= Oscar, Missouri =

Unincorporated community in Missouri, U.S.

Oscar
- Unincorporated community
- Location within the state of Missouri
- Coordinates: 37°24′51″N 91°49′50″W
- Country: United States
- State: Missouri
- County: Texas
- Elevation: 1,270 ft (390 m)
- Time zone: UTC-6 (Central (CST))
  - Summer (DST): UTC-5 (CDT)
- ZIP Code: 65542

Oscar is an unincorporated community within Jackson Township in Texas County, in the U.S. state of Missouri. The community is located on Missouri Route 137, approximately 5.5 miles south of Licking.

== History ==
A post office called Oscar was established in 1880, and remained in operation until 1915. The community has the name of Oscar Bradford, the son of an early settler.
