= Huggins, Missouri =

Unincorporated community in Missouri, U.S.

Huggins
- Unincorporated community
- Etymology: F. M. Huggins
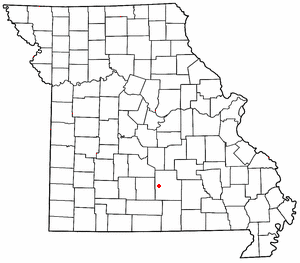
- Coordinates: 37°19′12″N 92°11′55″W
- Country: USA
- State: Missouri
- County: Texas

Huggins is an unincorporated community in western Texas County, Missouri, United States, approximately thirteen miles west of Houston. It is located on Route M, about two miles north of Route 38, near Bendavis.

== History ==
A post office called Huggins has been in operation since 1885. Francis M. Huggins, an early postmaster, gave the community his last name.
