= Louisa, Missouri =

Settlement in Missouri, United States

Coordinates: 37°08′10″N 91°54′37″W

Louisa is an extinct town in southern Texas County, in the U.S. state of Missouri. The community was located along the South Prong of Jacks Fork Creek, southeast of Grogan.

A post office called Louisa was established in 1905 and remained in operation until 1923. An early postmaster gave the community the name of his wife, Louisa Embree.
