= Pleasant Ridge, Texas County, Missouri =

Unincorporated community in Missouri, U.S.

Coordinates: 37°21′49″N 92°10′12″W

Pleasant Ridge is an unincorporated community in Texas County, Missouri, United States. The community is located on Pleasant Ridge Road, approximately three-quarters of a mile southwest of Upton and about ten miles west of Houston.

== History ==
A post office called Pleasant Ridge was established in 1877, the name was changed to Pleasantridge in 1894, and the post office closed in 1909. The community was so named on account of the "pleasant" setting of the original town site.
