= Eunice, Missouri =

Unincorporated community in Missouri, U.S.

Coordinates: 37°14′42″N 91°46′47″W

Eunice is an unincorporated community in southeastern Texas County, Missouri, United States. It is located approximately ten miles southeast of Houston on Route 17 midway between the communities of Yukon and Midvale.

A post office called Eunice has been in operation since 1890. An early postmaster gave the community the name of his wife, Eunice Cooper.
