= Bald Ridge Creek =

Location
- Country: United States
- State: Missouri
- Region: Texas and Phelps counties

Physical characteristics
- Source
  - location: Texas County, Missouri
  - coordinates: 37°32′54″N 92°06′57″W
- Mouth
  - location: Pulaski County, Missouri
  - coordinates: 37°39′26″N 92°04′15″W
  - elevation: 250 m (820 ft)

Bald Ridge Creek (also spelled Baldridge Creek) is a stream in northwest Texas County and southeast Pulaski County in the Ozarks of southern Missouri. It is a tributary of the Big Piney River. The headwaters of the stream arise to the southeast of Evening Shade and northeast of Missouri Route 17. The confluence with the Big Piney River is in Pulaski County southeast of the community of Big Piney and west of the community of Duke in Phelps County.

Bald Ridge Creek has the name of the local Baldridge family, original owners of the site.

== See also ==
- List of rivers of Missouri
