= Sponsler =

Sponsler may refer to:

- Claire Sponsler (1954-2016), American academic and writer
- Earl Sponsler (1913-2005), American politician from Missouri
- Karen Sponsler-Porter, producer of 2000s American children's TV series Nanna's Cottage
