= Raymondville =

Raymondville is the name of two towns in the United States:

- Raymondville, Missouri
- Raymondville, Texas
