= Guild, Missouri =

Unincorporated community in Missouri, U.S.

Coordinates: 37°04′12″N 91°48′07″W

Guild is an unincorporated community in southeast Texas County, in the U.S. state of Missouri. The community was located on a ridge just west of Stillhouse Branch and approximately 1/2 mile (0.80 kilometers) south of the South Prong Jacks Fork. The community of Hattie was about 1 1/2 miles (2.4 km) to the northeast on the South Prong. Access is via Missouri Route NN from Howell County and Mt. Olive Road. The former Mt. Olive School was located to the east across Stillhouse Branch.

== History ==
A post office called Guild was established in 1908, and remained in operation until 1932. It is unknown why the name "Guild" was applied to this community.
