= Fowler, Missouri =

Unincorporated community in Missouri, U.S.

Coordinates: 37°14′00″N 92°13′00″W

Fowler is an unincorporated community in southwest Texas County, in the U.S. state of Missouri.

The community is on Missouri Route MM, four miles south of Bendavis and seven miles north-northeast of Mountain Grove.

== History ==
A post office called Fowler was established in 1889, and remained in operation until 1923. The community has the name of Cecil Aresite Fowler, a local storekeeper.
