= Lenox, Missouri =

Unincorporated community in Missouri, U.S.

Lenox
- Unincorporated community
- Location within Missouri
- Coordinates: 37°39′11″N 91°45′41″W
- Country: United States
- State: Missouri
- County: Dent County
- Time zone: UTC-6 (Central (CST))
  - Summer (DST): UTC-5 (CDT)

Lenox is an unincorporated community in western Dent County, Missouri, United States. The community is located approximately twelve miles west of Salem at the intersection of routes H and C. Edgar Springs is approximately four miles to the northwest in adjacent Phelps County and the community of Maples is 4.5 miles to the south in Texas County.

A post office called Lenox was established in 1884, and remained in operation until 1998. The community has the name of the local Lenox family, pioneer citizens.
