= White Rock Bluffs Archeological Pictograph Site =

- U.S. National Register of Historic Places
- Nearest city: Bucyrus, Missouri
- Area: less than one acre
- NRHP reference No.: 69000126
- Added to NRHP: May 21, 1969

The White Rock Bluffs Archeological Pictograph Site in Texas County, Missouri is an archeological site with pictographs which is listed on the National Register of Historic Places. Its exact location has not been disclosed, though it is around 2 miles south of Bucyrus.

The pictographs are painted on sandstone. They include at least four depictions of figures, one is a warrior/hunter holding a dart or spear in a threatening position.
