= Sargent Township, Texas County, Missouri =

Township in the US state of Missouri

Coordinates: 37.0819°N 91.9992°W

Sargent Township is a township in Texas County, in the U.S. state of Missouri.

Erected in 1917, Sargent Township takes its name from the community of Sargent.
