= Samoa (disambiguation) =

Samoa (formerly Western Samoa) is a country in the South Pacific.

Samoa may also refer to:

- Samoan Islands, an archipelago comprising all of Samoa and most of American Samoa
- American Samoa, US Pacific Territory
- Samoans
- Samoan language
- Samoa, California
- Samoa, Missouri
- Samoa (ship), a Liberty ship built in 1943, see de:Samoa (Schiff, 1943)
- Samoas, a variety of Girl Scout cookie
- Samoa (orca)
- Samoa (harvestman), a genus of harvestmen
- Andra Samoa, American Samoan environmentalist
- Cocoa Samoa (1945–2007), American Samoan wrestler

== See also ==
- Sam Moa (born 1986), former professional rugby league footballer
