= Mitchells Corner =

Mitchells Corner or Mitchell's Corners may refer to:

- Mitchells Corner, Missouri
- Mitchell's Corners, Ontario
