= Ellis Prairie, Missouri =

Unincorporated community in Missouri, U.S.

Coordinates: 37°24′48″N 92°02′23″W

Ellis Prairie is an Unincorporated community in Texas County, Missouri, United States. It is located on Missouri Route AA, 7.5 miles northwest of Houston and 2.5 miles east of Mitchells Corner and Missouri Route 17.

A post office called Ellis Prairie was established in 1879, and remained in operation until 1979. The community has the name of Washington Asa Ellis, who settled on a nearby prairie.
