= Fairview, Texas County, Missouri =

Unincorporated community in Texas County, Missouri, United States

Coordinates: 37°17′54″N 92°09′50″W

Fairview is an unincorporated community in Morris Township, Texas County, Missouri, United States,, about 13 miles (21 km) northeast of Mountain Grove along Missouri Route 38.
