= Beulah, Missouri =

Unincorporated community in Missouri, U.S.

Coordinates: 37°37′26″N 91°55′01″W

Beulah is an unincorporated community in northern Texas county and southern Phelps County, Missouri, United States. It is located at the edge of the Mark Twain National Forest, approximately nine miles north of Licking in adjacent Texas County. The community is on both sides of Missouri Route K, three miles west of U.S. Route 63.

== History ==
A post office called Beulah was established in 1886, and remained in operation until 1995. An early postmaster gave the community the name of his daughter.
