= Vada, Missouri =

Unincorporated community in Missouri, U.S.

Coordinates: 37°28′18″N 92°03′04″W

Vada is an unincorporated community in northern Texas County, in the U.S. state of Missouri. The community is located on Missouri Route 32, approximately three miles northeast of Success.

== History ==
A post office called Vada was established in 1917, and remained in operation until 1929. An early postmaster named the community after his daughter, Nevada "Vada" Jackson.
