= Ladd, Missouri =

Human settlement in Missouri, United States

Coordinates: 37°35′11″N 92°06′44″W

Ladd is an unincorporated community in northwestern Texas County, in the U.S. state of Missouri.

The community was located in Long Hollow, approximately 1.25 miles south of the Texas-Pulaski county line and about 1.75 miles northeast of Evening Shade. The Long Hollow church and cemetery are located about one-half mile south in Long Hollow and the historic Long Hollow school was located near the community site.

== History ==
A post office called Ladd was established in 1892, and remained in operation until 1922. The community has the name of Ladd Davis, the son of an early settler.
