= Stultz, Missouri =

Unincorporated community in Missouri, U.S.

Coordinates: 37°10′36″N 91°57′26″W

Stultz is an unincorporated community in southern Texas County, in the U.S. state of Missouri. The community is located on a tributary of Elk Creek, approximately 2.3 miles east-southeast of the community of Elk Creek.

== History ==
A post office called Stultz was established in 1887, and remained in operation until 1941. The community has the name of Lamech Stultz, a pioneer citizen.
