= Piney Township, Texas County, Missouri =

Township in the American state of Missouri

Coordinates: 37.3219°N 91.9731°W

Piney Township is a township in Texas County, in the U.S. state of Missouri.

Piney Township was erected in 1845, taking its name from the Big Piney River.
