= Arthur W. and Chloe B. Cole House =

Historic house in Missouri, United States

- U.S. National Register of Historic Places
- Location within Missouri Location within the United States
- Location: 5803 Rocky Branch Rd., Houston, Missouri
- Coordinates: 37°15′42″N 92°1′58″W
- Built: 1901
- Architect: Arthur Cole; Jeff Downing
- Architectural style: Octagon Mode
- NRHP reference No.: 98001500
- Added to NRHP: December 10, 1998

The Arthur W. and Chloe B. Cole House (also known as The Octagon House and Cole's Castle) is an historic octagonal house located at 5803 Rocky Branch Road near Houston, Texas County, Missouri. Construction began in 1898 and was completed in 1901. Its walls are of poured concrete.

It was listed on the National Register of Historic Places on December 10, 1998.
