= Clinton Township, Texas County, Missouri =

Township in the US state of Missouri

Coordinates: 37.1294°N 92.2047°W

Clinton Township is a township in Texas County, in the U.S. state of Missouri.

Clinton Township was erected in 1848, taking its name from DeWitt Clinton.
