= Nile, Missouri =

Unincorporated community in Missouri, U.S.

Coordinates: 37°21′36″N 91°39′58″W

Nile is an unincorporated community in eastern Texas County, in the U.S. state of Missouri. The community is situated on the floodplain of Big Creek, approximately one mile west of the Texas-Shannon county line. The old Nile Schoolhouse was about one mile east (upstream) and on the opposite side of the river across a stream ford.

== History ==
A post office called Nile was established in 1891, and remained in operation until 1914. The community once contained Nile Schoolhouse. The riverside community's name most likely is an allusion to the Nile, in Egypt.
