= Dent, Missouri =

Unincorporated community in Missouri, U.S.

Coordinates: 37°33′12″N 91°58′26″W

Dent is an unincorporated community in Texas County, in the U.S. state of Missouri.

== History ==
A post office called Dent was established in 1900, and remained in operation until 1933. The community has the name of the local Dent family.
