= Boone Township, Texas County, Missouri =

Inactive township in the US state of Missouri

Coordinates: 37.5583°N 92.0003°W

Boone Township is a township in Texas County, in the U.S. state of Missouri.

Boone Township was erected in 1845, taking its name from frontiersman Daniel Boone.
