= Sargent, Texas County, Missouri =

Unincorporated community in Missouri, U.S.

Coordinates: 37°05′12″N 92°01′38″W

Sargent is an unincorporated community in southern Texas County, in the U.S. state of Missouri. The community is adjacent to the Burlington Northern Railroad, approximately four miles southeast of Cabool. The Texas County-Howell county line is about two miles south of the location. Potter Creek flows past the east side of the community.

== History ==
A post office called Sargent was established in 1884, and remained in operation until 1931. The community has the name of one Mr. Sargent, a railroad employee.
