= Prescott, Missouri =

Unincorporated community in Missouri, U.S.

Coordinates: 37°26′13″N 91°55′18″W

Prescott is an unincorporated community in northern Texas County, in the U.S. state of Missouri. The community lies approximately 4.5 miles southwest of Licking and the Big Piney River flows about 1.5 miles to the west of the location. The Prescott Church and cemetery lie one-half mile south.

== History ==
A post office called Prescott was established in 1898, and remained in operation until 1953. Valentine Prescott, an early postmaster, gave the community his last name.
