= Simmons, Missouri =

Unincorporated community in Missouri, U.S.

Coordinates: 37°13′50″N 92°00′56″W

Simmons is a community in Texas County, in the U.S. state of Missouri. The community is located at the intersection of US Route 63 and Missouri Route Z, approximately seven miles south of Houston. The Big Piney River flows past the east side of the community.

== History ==
A post office called Simmons was established in 1892, and remained in operation until 1958. D. L. Simmons, an early postmaster, gave the community his last name.
