= Roubidoux Township, Texas County, Missouri =

Township in the US state of Missouri

Coordinates: 37.5353°N 92.1658°W

Roubidoux Township is a township in Texas County, in the U.S. state of Missouri.

Roubidoux Township was erected in 1845, taking its name from Roubidoux Creek.
