= Lynch Township, Texas County, Missouri =

Township in Texas County, Missouri, U.S.

Coordinates: 37.4494°N 91.9953°W

Lynch Township is a township in Texas County, in the U.S. state of Missouri.

Lynch Township was erected in 1854, taking its name from John Lynch, a pioneer citizen.
