= Clear Springs, Missouri =

Unincorporated community in Missouri, U.S.

Coordinates: 37°06′30″N 91°51′02″W

Clear Springs is an unincorporated community in southern Texas County, in the U.S. state of Missouri. The community is located on Missouri Route Y, one mile east of Missouri Route 137. The spring is on the South Prong Jacks Fork, 1.5 miles south of the community site.

== History ==
A post office called Clear Springs was established in 1880, and remained in operation until 1953. The community took its name from a spring of the same name near the original town site.
