= Lundy, Missouri =

Unincorporated community in Missouri, U.S.

Coordinates: 37°16′59″N 92°03′35″W

Lundy is an unincorporated community in Texas County, in the U.S. state of Missouri.

== History ==
A post office called Lundy was established in 1891, and remained in operation until 1919. The community has the name of John Lundy, the proprietor of a local mill.
