= Raymondville, Missouri =

Village in Texas County, Missouri, United States

- Village
- Location of Raymondville, Missouri
- Coordinates: 37°20′23″N 91°50′03″W
- Country: United States
- State: Missouri
- County: Texas

Area
  - Total: 2.95 sq mi (7.65 km^{2})
  - Land: 2.95 sq mi (7.65 km^{2})
  - Water: 0 sq mi (0.00 km^{2})
- Elevation: 1,312 ft (400 m)

Population (2020)
  - Total: 345
  - Density: 117/sq mi (45.1/km^{2})
- Time zone: UTC-6 (Central (CST))
  - Summer (DST): UTC-5 (CDT)
- ZIP code: 65555
- Area code: 417
- FIPS code: 29-60734
- GNIS feature ID: 2396870
- Website: www.gotrain.org/raymondville

Raymondville is a village in Texas County, Missouri, United States. The population was 345 at the 2020 census.

== History ==
A post office called Raymondville has been in operation since 1871. The community was named after Raymond, Maine, the native home of a first settler.

== Geography ==
Raymondville is located in the Ozarks of southern Missouri. The town is in central Texas County on Missouri routes 137 and B, approximately six miles east of Houston. Yukon is about five miles south and Licking is about ten miles north on route 137.

According to the United States Census Bureau, the village has a total area of 2.95 square miles (7.64 km^{2}), all land.

== Demographics ==
Historical population
Census	Pop.	Note	%±
1950	175		—
1960	202		15.4%
1970	284		40.6%
1980	388		36.6%
1990	425		9.5%
2000	442		4.0%
2010	363		−17.9%
2020	345		−5.0%
U.S. Decennial Census

=== 2010 census ===
As of the census of 2010, there were 363 people, 157 households, and 96 families living in the village. The population density was 123.1 inhabitants per square mile (47.5/km^{2}). There were 189 housing units at an average density of 64.1 units per square mile (24.7 units/km^{2}). The racial makeup of the village was 96.7% White, 0.3% African American, 0.3% Asian, 0.3% from other races, and 2.5% from two or more races. Hispanic or Latino of any race were 0.8% of the population.

There were 157 households, of which 28.7% had children under the age of 18 living with them, 45.9% were married couples living together, 12.1% had a female householder with no husband present, 3.2% had a male householder with no wife present, and 38.9% were non-families. 33.1% of all households were made up of individuals, and 15.3% had someone living alone who was 65 years of age or older. The average household size was 2.31 and the average family size was 2.95.

The median age in the village was 41.7 years. 24% of residents were under the age of 18; 7.1% were between the ages of 18 and 24; 21% were from 25 to 44; 30.3% were from 45 to 64; and 17.6% were 65 years of age or older. The gender makeup of the village was 49.0% male and 51.0% female.

=== 2000 census ===
As of the census of 2000, there were 442 people, 173 households, and 115 families living in the town. The population density was 150.0 inhabitants per square mile (57.9/km^{2}). There were 189 housing units at an average density of 64.1 units per square mile (24.7 units/km^{2}). The racial makeup of the town was 96.61% White, 0.45% African American, 0.45% Native American, 0.68% Asian, and 1.81% from two or more races. Hispanic or Latino of any race were 0.45% of the population.

There were 173 households, out of which 34.7% had children under the age of 18 living with them, 46.8% were married couples living together, 10.4% had a female householder with no husband present, and 33.5% were non-families. 30.6% of all households were made up of individuals, and 16.2% had someone living alone who was 65 years of age or older. The average household size was 2.49 and the average family size was 3.06.

In the town the population was spread out, with 27.8% under the age of 18, 7.0% from 18 to 24, 24.4% from 25 to 44, 24.4% from 45 to 64, and 16.3% who were 65 years of age or older. The median age was 39 years. For every 100 females, there were 97.3 males. For every 100 females age 18 and over, there were 87.6 males.

The median income for a household in the town was $16,806, and the median income for a family was $21,667. Males had a median income of $22,500 versus $14,063 for females. The per capita income for the town was $10,500. About 30.0% of families and 30.2% of the population were below the poverty line, including 40.0% of those under age 18 and 27.3% of those age 65 or over.

== See also ==
- List of cities in Missouri
