= Sherrill Township, Texas County, Missouri =

Township in the U.S. state of Missouri

Coordinates: 37.5197°N 91.8383°W

Sherrill Township is a township in Texas County, in the U.S. state of Missouri.

Sherrill Township was erected in 1848, taking its name from Joel and John Sherrill, pioneer citizens. The hamlet of Sherrill is in the township.
