= Bado, Missouri =

Unincorporated community in Missouri, U.S.

Coordinates: 37°16′09″N 92°07′25″W

Bado is an unincorporated community in southwest Texas County, in the U.S. state of Missouri. Bado is located on Missouri Route M, along the banks of Little Piney Creek. The community is approximately nine miles west-southwest of Houston and nine miles north of Cabool. The store, post office, a rock house and White House are still standing.

== History ==
A post office called Bado was established in 1883, and remained in operation until 1953. According to tradition, the community arose during a "bad" era, hence the name.
