= Burdine Township, Texas County, Missouri =

Township in the US state of Missouri

Coordinates: 37.1189°N 92.0800°W

Burdine Township is a township in Texas County, in the U.S. state of Missouri.

Burdine Township was erected in 1858, taking its name from Reuben Burdine, a pioneer citizen.
