= Clara, Missouri =

Unincorporated community in Missouri, U.S.

Coordinates: 37°17′59″N 92°01′17″W

Clara is an Unincorporated community in central Texas County, Missouri, United States. The community is located on a hilltop, approximately one-half mile northwest of the Big Piney River. It is about three miles southwest of Houston on Missouri Route Z.

A post office called Clara was established in 1901, and remained in operation until 1975. An early postmaster gave the community the name of his wife, Clara Lynch.
