= Mitchells Corner, Missouri =

Unincorporated community in Missouri, U.S.

Coordinates: 37°24′32″N 92°04′20″W

Mitchells Corner is an unincorporated community in Texas County, in the U.S. state of Missouri. The community is approximately eight miles northwest of Houston on Missouri Route 17. Success is about two miles north on Route 17.

A variant name was "Mitchells Store". The community has the name of T. N. Mitchell, the proprietor of a country store.
