= Current Township, Texas County, Missouri =

Township in the American state of Missouri

Coordinates: 37.2939°N 91.7058°W

Current Township is a township in Texas and Dent counties, in the U.S. state of Missouri.

Current Township was erected in 1852, taking its name from the Current River.
