= Roby, Missouri =

Unincorporated community in Texas County, Missouri, United States

Coordinates: 37°30′56″N 92°08′21″W

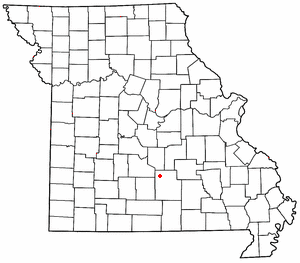

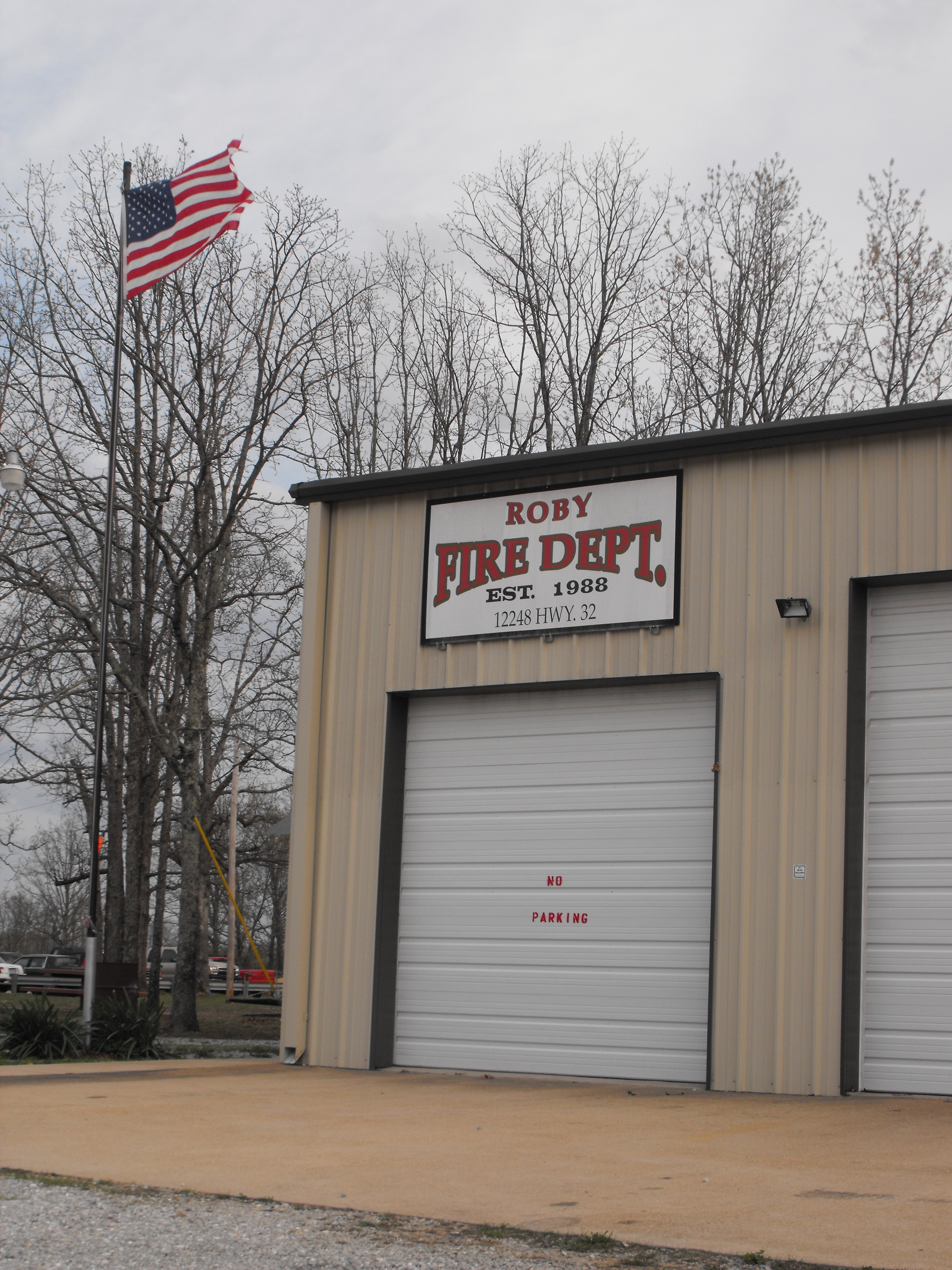
Roby Fire Station

Roby is an unincorporated community in northwestern Texas County, Missouri, United States.

== Description ==
The community is located approximately sixteen miles (26 km) northwest of Houston and ten miles (16 km) south of Fort Leonard Wood at the northern junction of Routes 17 and Route 32. Roby is home to the "Mark Twain National Forest" campgrounds.

A post office called Roby has been in operation since 1883. The community has the name of Cyrus H. Roby, who kept a store in the area.
