= Houston Ranger Station Historic District =

Historic district in Missouri, United States

- U.S. National Register of Historic Places
- U.S. Historic district
- Location within Missouri Location within the United States
- Location: 104 MO 63S, Houston, Missouri
- Coordinates: 37°19′17″N 91°57′22″W
- Area: 3.3 acres (1.3 ha)
- Built: 1936-1937
- Built by: Civilian Conservation Corps
- Architectural style: Colonial Revival
- MPS: Mark Twain National Forest MPS
- NRHP reference No.: 03000713
- Added to NRHP: August 4, 2003

Houston Ranger Station Historic District is a national historic district located in Mark Twain National Forest near Houston, Texas County, Missouri. The district encompasses five frame and limestone buildings constructed by the Lynchburg Camp of the Civilian Conservation Corps (CCC) during 1936 and 1937. They are the 1 1/2-story Colonial Revival style ranger's office, 1 1/2-story Colonial Revival style dwelling, garage, warehouse and oil house.

It was listed on the National Register of Historic Places in 2003.
