= Upton, Missouri =

Unincorporated community in Missouri, U.S.

Coordinates: 37°22′05″N 92°09′40″W

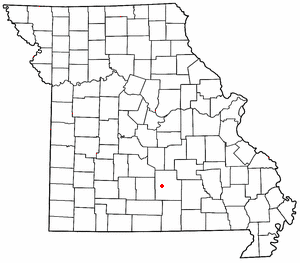

Upton is an Unincorporated community in western Texas County, Missouri, United States. The community is located on a ridge top (elevation 1430 ft.) approximately one mile east of the West Fork Roubidoux Creek. It is located about ten miles west of Houston on Missouri Route FF.

A post office called Upton was established in 1907, and remained in operation until 1975. The community has the name of Osias Upton, a pioneer citizen. However, Brigham was considered for Joseph Brigham, another pioneer of the community.
