= Morris Township, Texas County, Missouri =

Township in the US state of Missouri

Coordinates: 37.2781°N 92.1658°W

Morris Township is a township in Texas County, in the U.S. state of Missouri.

Morris Township was erected in 1852, taking its name from Macajah Morris, a pioneer citizen.
