= Hattie, Missouri =

Extinct hamlet in Missouri, U.S.

Coordinates: 37°04′47″N 91°46′25″W

Hattie is an extinct town in southeast Texas County, in the U.S. state of Missouri. The GNIS classifies it as a populated place. The community is on the South Prong Jacks Fork, south of Missouri Route Y, and two miles north of the county line.

A post office called Hattie was established in 1891, and remained in operation until 1957. The community has the name of Hattie Cross, the wife of an early settler, John P Cross who acquired the land through the U.S. Homestead Act with his father William Cross. Upon John P's death in 1930, his wife, Gladys Cross (Parker/Fehr) assumed the role as post mistress for Hattie and continued to serve as post mistress for the outlying area around the homestead through two more marriages (Parker/Fehr). Both she and her husband John P. Cross operated the post office from their small bedroom on the Hattie homestead. The homestead survived until the late 60's when Gladys passed. Her children, relocated throughout Iowa and Kansas City.
