= Elk Creek, Missouri =

- Unincorporated community
- Location within the state of Missouri
- Coordinates: 37°11′20″N 91°59′50″W
- Country: United States
- State: Missouri
- Time zone: UTC-6 (Central (CST))
  - Summer (DST): UTC-5 (CDT)

Elk Creek is an unincorporated community in Texas County, Missouri, United States. It is located approximately nine miles south of Houston.

A post office called Elk Creek has been in operation since 1860. The community was so named on account of the elk once abundant in the area.
