= Houston High School (Houston, Missouri) =

Public school in Missouri, United States

Location
- 423 West Pine Street; Houston, (Texas County), Missouri 65483; United States

Information
- Type: Public high school
- Principal: Amanda Munson
- Teaching staff: 30.91 (FTE)
- Enrollment: 359 (2024-2025)
- Student to teacher ratio: 11.61
- Colors: Red and black
- Nickname: Tigers

- Houston High School
- U.S. National Register of Historic Places
- Location within Missouri Location within the United States
- Location: 423 W. Pine, Houston, Missouri
- Coordinates: 37°19′43″N 91°57′35″W
- Area: less than one acre
- Built: 1921
- Architectural style: Late 19th And 20th Century Revivals
- NRHP reference No.: 09000016
- Added to NRHP: February 12, 2009

Houston High School is a public high school serving Houston, Texas County, Missouri. It is operated by the Houston R-I School District. The high school building is a registered historic site.

== History ==
Houston High School was built in 1921, as a two-story, brick building on a raised basement. It sits on a concrete foundation and has native stone architectural details. The property was listed on the National Register of Historic Places in 2009.

== Notable people ==
- Mack Gladden (1909–1985), American football player and coach
