= Evening Shade, Missouri =

Unincorporated community in Missouri, United States

Coordinates: 37°34′32″N 92°08′30″W

Evening Shade is an unincorporated community in northwest Texas County, in the U.S. state of Missouri.

The community is located on Missouri Route AW, approximately four miles north of Roby. The community of Old Evening Shade is about two miles to the northwest.

== History ==
A post office called Eveningshade was established in 1900, and remained in operation until 1957. The community was descriptively named.
