= Maples, Missouri =

Unincorporated community in Missouri, U.S.

Coordinates: 37°35′03″N 91°47′01″W

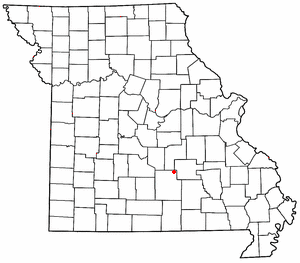

Maples is an unincorporated community in northeastern Texas County, Missouri, United States. It is located approximately seven miles northeast of Licking on Missouri Route C.

== History ==
A post office called Maples was established in 1891, and remained in operation until 1967. J. J. Maples, an early postmaster, gave the community his last name.
