= Bucyrus, Missouri =

Unincorporated community in Missouri, U.S.

Coordinates: 37°20′39″N 92°01′01″W

Bucyrus is an unincorporated community in central Texas County, Missouri, United States. It is located on Route 17, approximately three miles northwest of Houston. The ZIP Code for Bucyrus is 65444.

An early variant name was "Odd". A post office called Bucyrus has been in operation since 1898. The present name is after the city of Bucyrus, Ohio, the native home of a first settler.
