= Ozark Township, Texas County, Missouri =

Township in the U.S. state of Missouri

Coordinates: 37.2094°N 91.8081°W

Ozark Township is a township in Texas County, in the U.S. state of Missouri. It was erected in 1860, taking its name from the Ozarks range.
