= Jacksonville, Missouri =

- Village
- Location of Jacksonville, Missouri
- Coordinates: 39°35′16″N 92°28′22″W
- Country: United States
- State: Missouri
- County: Randolph

Area
  - Total: 0.11 sq mi (0.29 km^{2})
  - Land: 0.11 sq mi (0.29 km^{2})
  - Water: 0 sq mi (0.00 km^{2})
- Elevation: 863 ft (263 m)

Population (2020)
  - Total: 122
  - Density: 1,107.3/sq mi (427.55/km^{2})
- Time zone: UTC-6 (Central (CST))
  - Summer (DST): UTC-5 (CDT)
- ZIP code: 65260
- Area code: 660
- FIPS code: 29-36224
- GNIS feature ID: 2398289

Jacksonville is a village in Randolph County, Missouri, United States. As of the 2020 census, Jacksonville had a population of 122.

== History ==
A post office called Jacksonville has been in operation since 1837. The community takes its name from Jackson Township.

== Geography ==
According to the United States Census Bureau, the village has a total area of 0.11 square miles (0.28 km^{2}), all land.

== Demographics ==
Historical population
Census	Pop.	Note	%±
1880	163		—
1890	166		1.8%
1900	195		17.5%
1910	200		2.6%
1920	275		37.5%
1930	177		−35.6%
1940	181		2.3%
1950	177		−2.2%
1960	153		−13.6%
1970	142		−7.2%
1980	130		−8.5%
1990	115		−11.5%
2000	163		41.7%
2010	151		−7.4%
2020	122		−19.2%
U.S. Decennial Census

=== 2010 census ===
As of the 2010 census, there were 151 people, 56 households, and 41 families living in the village. The population density was 1,372.7 inhabitants per square mile (530.0/km^{2}). There were 65 housing units at an average density of 590.9 per square mile (228.1/km^{2}). The racial makeup of the village was 98.0% White, 0.7% African American, and 1.3% from two or more races. Hispanic or Latino of any race were 2.0% of the population.

There were 56 households, of which 50.0% had children under the age of 18 living with them, 55.4% were married couples living together, 10.7% had a female householder with no husband present, 7.1% had a male householder with no wife present, and 26.8% were non-families. 25.0% of all households were made up of individuals, and 7.2% had someone living alone who was 65 years of age or older. The average household size was 2.70 and the average family size was 3.17.

The median age in the village was 32.8 years. 27.2% of residents were under the age of 18; 8.5% were between the ages of 18 and 24; 27.2% were from 25 to 44; 25.1% were from 45 to 64; and 11.9% were 65 years of age or older. The gender makeup of the village was 47.0% male and 53.0% female.

=== 2000 census ===
As of the 2000 census, there were 162 people, 57 households, and 44 families living in the village. The population density was 1,439.7 inhabitants per square mile (555.9/km^{2}). There were 59 housing units at an average density of 521.1 per square mile (201.2/km^{2}). The racial makeup of the village was 98.77% White and 1.23% Asian.

There were 57 households, out of which 35.1% had children under the age of 18 living with them, 61.4% were married couples living together, 12.3% had a female householder with no husband present, and 22.8% were non-families. 19.3% of all households were made up of individuals, and 14.0% had someone living alone who was 65 years of age or older. The average household size was 2.86 and the average family size was 3.23.

In the village, the population was spread out, with 32.5% under the age of 18, 7.4% from 18 to 24, 32.5% from 25 to 44, 16.0% from 45 to 64, and 11.7% who were 65 years of age or older. The median age was 32 years. For every 100 females, there were 123.3 males. For every 100 females age 18 and over, there were 96.4 males.

The median income for a household in the village was $24,500, and the median income for a family was $34,063. Males had a median income of $32,292 versus $19,583 for females. The per capita income for the village was $10,626. About 2.3% of families and 7.6% of the population were below the poverty line, including 1.6% of those under the age of eighteen and 42.9% of those 65 or over.
