= Jackson Township, Texas County, Missouri =

Township in Texas County, Missouri, U.S.

Coordinates: 37.3675°N 91.7669°W

Jackson Township is a township in Texas County, in the U.S. state of Missouri.

Jackson Township was erected in 1845, taking its name from Jackson D. Trusty, a politically active early citizen.
