= Bendavis, Missouri =

Unincorporated community in Texas County, Missouri, United States

Coordinates: 37°17′54″N 92°12′27″W

Bendavis is an unincorporated community in western Texas County, Missouri, United States. It is located approximately thirteen miles west of Houston on Route 38.

== Description ==
A post office called Bendavis was established in 1907, and remained in operation until 1992. The community is named after the Ben Davis variety of apple.
