= Willow Springs, Missouri =

- City
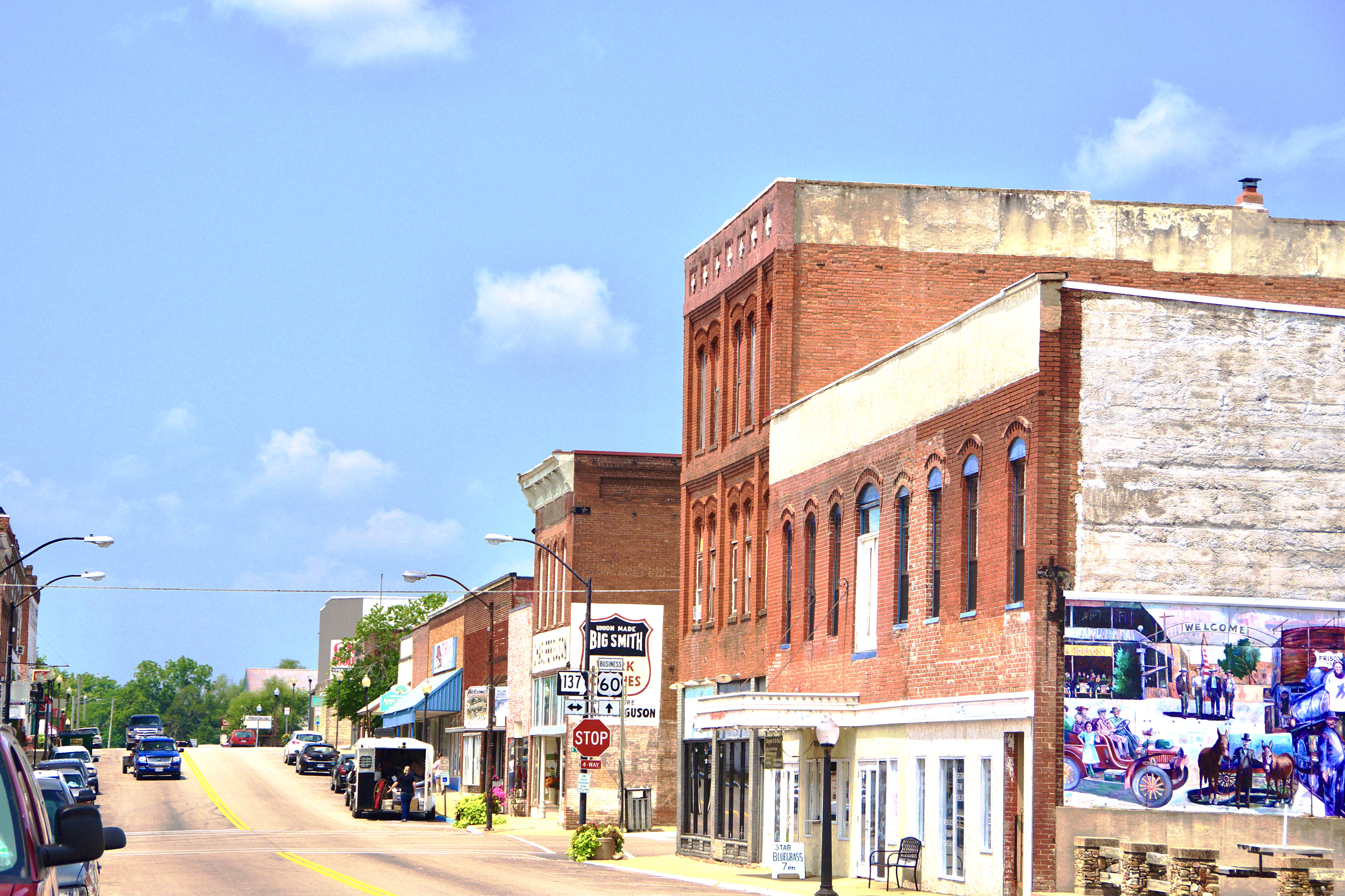
- Main Street

- Location of Willow Springs, Missouri
- Coordinates: 36°59′15″N 91°57′46″W
- Country: United States
- State: Missouri
- County: Howell

Area
  - Total: 3.77 sq mi (9.77 km^{2})
  - Land: 3.76 sq mi (9.73 km^{2})
  - Water: 0.015 sq mi (0.04 km^{2})
- Elevation: 1,227 ft (374 m)

Population (2020)
  - Total: 2,164
  - Density: 575.8/sq mi (222.31/km^{2})
- Time zone: UTC-6 (Central (CST))
  - Summer (DST): UTC-5 (CDT)
- ZIP code: 65793
- Area code: 417
- FIPS code: 29-80098
- GNIS feature ID: 2397325
- Website: willowspringsmo.com

Willow Springs is a city in Howell County, Missouri in the Ozark Mountains of the United States. The population was 2,164 at the 2020 census.

== History ==
Willow Springs was named from its position at the site of a spring, surrounded by willows.

== Geography ==
According to the United States Census Bureau, the city has a total area of 3.55 square miles (9.19 km^{2}), of which 3.53 square miles (9.14 km^{2}) is land and 0.02 square miles (0.05 km^{2}) is water. The community is located on Route 137, east of concurrent U.S. Routes 60 and 63.

== Demographics ==
Historical population
Census	Pop.	Note	%±
1890	1,535		—
1900	1,078		−29.8%
1910	1,401		30.0%
1920	1,441		2.9%
1930	1,430		−0.8%
1940	1,530		7.0%
1950	1,914		25.1%
1960	1,913		−0.1%
1970	2,045		6.9%
1980	2,215		8.3%
1990	2,038		−8.0%
2000	2,147		5.3%
2010	2,184		1.7%
2020	2,164		−0.9%
U.S. Decennial Census

=== 2020 census ===
As of the 2020 census, Willow Springs had a population of 2,164. The median age was 39.6 years. 25.1% of residents were under the age of 18 and 21.6% of residents were 65 years of age or older. For every 100 females there were 88.8 males, and for every 100 females age 18 and over there were 79.4 males age 18 and over. Of residents living in urban areas 0 percent of residents lived in urban areas, while 100% lived in rural areas.

There were 920 households in Willow Springs, of which 31.3% had children under the age of 18 living in them. Of all households, 37.6% were married-couple households, 18.2% were households with a male householder and no spouse or partner present, and 35.8% were households with a female householder and no spouse or partner present. About 36.6% of all households were made up of individuals and 18.3% had someone living alone who was 65 years of age or older. There were 1,059 housing units, of which 13.1% were vacant. The homeowner vacancy rate was 7.3% and the rental vacancy rate was 5.6%.

Racial composition as of the 2020 census
Race	Number	Percent
White	1,920	88.7%
Black or African American	9	0.4%
American Indian and Alaska Native	11	0.5%
Asian	14	0.6%
Native Hawaiian and Other Pacific Islander	4	0.2%
Some other race	17	0.8%
Two or more races	189	8.7%
Hispanic or Latino (of any race)	83	3.8%

=== 2010 census ===
As of the census of 2010, there were 2,184 people, 925 households, and 564 families living in the city. The population density was 618.7 inhabitants per square mile (238.9/km^{2}). There were 1,082 housing units at an average density of 306.5 per square mile (118.3/km^{2}). The racial makeup of the city was 96.11% White, 0.14% Black or African American, 0.41% Native American, 0.73% Asian, 0.46% from other races, and 2.15% from two or more races. Hispanic or Latino of any race were 2.06% of the population.

There were 925 households, of which 31.5% had children under the age of 18 living with them, 42.3% were married couples living together, 13.7% had a female householder with no husband present, 5.0% had a male householder with no wife present, and 39.0% were non-families. 35.1% of all households were made up of individuals, and 18.3% had someone living alone who was 65 years of age or older. The average household size was 2.36 and the average family size was 2.94. The median age in the city was 38.6 years. 26.6% of residents were under the age of 18; 8.1% were between the ages of 18 and 24; 23.2% were from 25 to 44; 21.1% were from 45 to 64; and 21.1% were 65 years of age or older. The gender makeup of the city was 47.1% male and 52.9% female.

=== 2000 census ===
As of the census of 2000, there were 2,147 people, 913 households, and 545 families living in the city. The population density was 654.9 inhabitants per square mile (252.9/km^{2}). There were 1,033 housing units at an average density of 315.1 per square mile (121.7/km^{2}). The racial makeup of the city was 97.02% White, 0.37% African American, 0.84% Native American, 0.28% Asian, and 1.49% from two or more races. Hispanic or Latino of any race were 1.07% of the population.

There were 913 households, out of which 27.6% had children under the age of 18 living with them, 46.8% were married couples living together, 10.5% had a female householder with no husband present, and 40.3% were non-families. 36.0% of all households were made up of individuals, and 22.3% had someone living alone who was 65 years of age or older. The average household size was 2.21 and the average family size was 2.89. In the city the population was spread out, with 23.5% under the age of 18, 7.7% from 18 to 24, 22.6% from 25 to 44, 19.2% from 45 to 64, and 27.0% who were 65 years of age or older. The median age was 42 years. For every 100 females, there were 82.6 males. For every 100 females age 18 and over, there were 73.3 males.

The median income for a household in the city was $19,894, and the median income for a family was $25,917. Males had a median income of $22,357 versus $16,316 for females. The per capita income for the city was $13,681. About 20.8% of families and 26.0% of the population were below the poverty line, including 41.4% of those under age 18 and 17.0% of those age 65 or over.

== Education ==
Public education in Willow Springs is administered by Willow Springs R-IV School District. The city has a lending library, the Willow Springs Public Library.

== Notable people ==
- Steve Cropper, guitarist/songwriter/producer and member of Booker T. & the M.G.'s (which backed artists including Otis Redding and Sam & Dave) additionally he was a member of The Blues Brothers; born on a farm near Willow Springs in 1941
- Bob Ferguson was a RCA record producer and songwriter, known for his song "On the Wings of a Dove" which was recorded first by Ferlin Husky in the early 1960s Later, he produced records for Chet Atkins, Dolly Parton, Waylon Jennings, and many others. He was born in Willow Springs in 1927.
- Rowe Findley, National Geographic writer and editor, was born in Willow Springs and grew up there
- Hannah Harper, an American Idol Season 24 fan favorite for singing a poignant song especially relating to young mothers called "String Cheese". She won the competition for America's Idol of 2026.
