= Success, Missouri =

Success
- Unincorporated community
- Location within Missouri
- Coordinates: 37°26′37″N 92°05′16″W
- Country: United States
- State: Missouri
- County: Texas County
- Elevation: 1,404 ft (428 m)
- Time zone: UTC-5 (Central (CST))
  - Summer (DST): UTC-4 (CDT)

Success is an unincorporated community in Texas County, Missouri, United States. It is located approximately twelve miles northwest of Houston at the southern intersection of Routes 17 and 32.

== History ==
The first settlement at Success was made in 1880. The nearby original town site is today officially known as "Old Success" and is located about one mile to the north. A post office called Success has been in operation since 1880. Founders of the community most likely named it "Success" in order to promote a mineral spa established there.

== Education ==
The Success R-VI School District has a K-8 enrollment. The students attend Houston, Plato and Licking for high school.
