= Missouri Route 137 =

State highway in Missouri, U.S.

Route 137
- MO 137 highlighted in red

Route information
- Maintained by MoDOT
- Length: 43.071 mi (69.316 km)

Major junctions
- South end: US 60 / US 63 / Route 76 in Willow Springs
- North end: Route 32 in Licking

Location
- Country: United States
- State: Missouri

Highway system
- Missouri State Highway System; Interstate; US; State; Supplemental
← US 136	→ Route 138

Route 137 is a highway in southern Missouri. Its northern terminus is at Route 32 in Licking; its southern terminus is at U.S. Route 60/U.S. Route 63/Route 76 in Willow Springs.

== History ==
The road that is Route 137 first appeared on state maps in 1933 as Route J. However, in that year it was only a short spur from U.S 60 & 63, only going as far as the Texas/Howell County line. Route J was extended to Route 17 in Yukon the following year. Route J was upgraded to Route 137 in 1937. In 1964, Route 137 was extended to Licking, taking over a section of U.S Route 63 (U.S 63 was subsequently routed on to a new road to the west). The former section of U.S 63 between Houston and Raymondville still remains part of the state system as Route B (Route T from 1964 to 1975).

== Major intersections ==
County	Location	mi	km	Destinations	Notes
Howell	Willow Springs	0.000	0.000	US 60 / US 63 – Cabool, West Plains Route 76 west	Roadway continues as Route 76
Texas	Ozark Township	24.757	39.843	Route 17 south – Summersville	Southern end of Route 17 overlap
Texas	Yukon	25.476	41.000	Route 17 north – Houston	Northern end of Route 17 overlap
Texas	Licking	43.071	69.316	Route 32	
1.000 mi = 1.609 km; 1.000 km = 0.621 mi: Concurrency terminus
