= Jacks Fork =

River in the United States of America

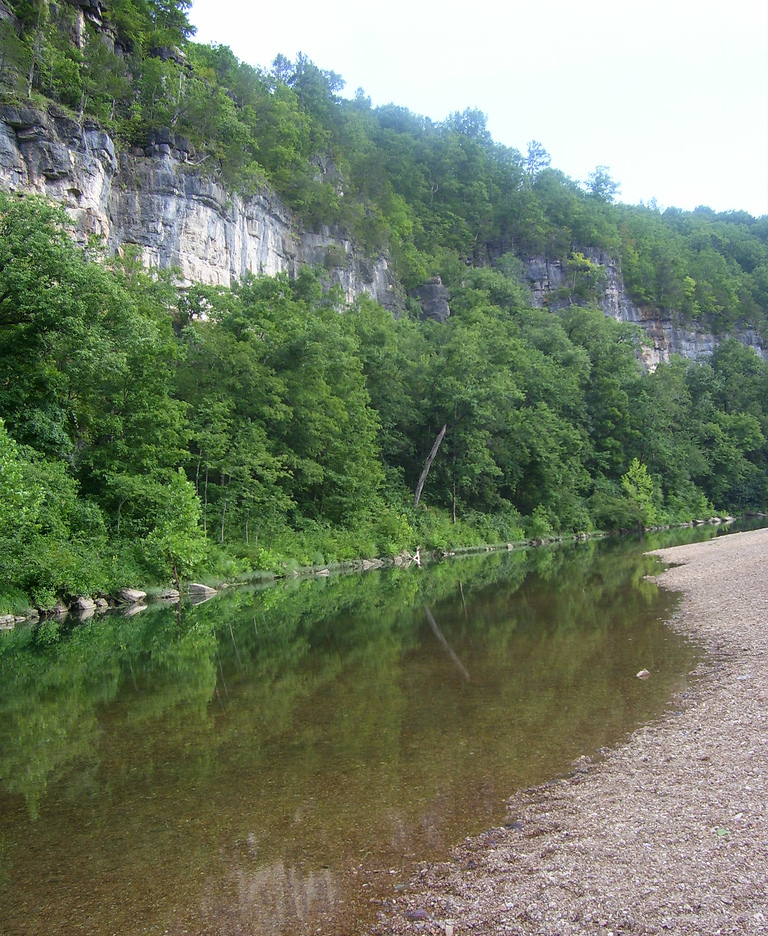
A line of bluffs along the Jacks Fork

Jacks Fork is one of two rivers in Missouri that are part of the Ozark National Scenic Riverways system.

Starting in Texas County, Missouri, this spring-fed river flows 46.4 miles (74.7 km) in a general east to northeasterly direction through the heart of the geological area known as the Lower Ozark Natural Division. It is the major tributary of the Current River, ending at its confluence near Eminence, Missouri. At this location, its mean annual discharge is 478 cubic feet per second.

The first 25 miles (40 km) from the Prongs to Bay Creek is deep valley and in the springtime provides Class II water. Due to lack of access, it is the most primitive of the rivers in the region. From Alley Spring to its confluence with the Current River it is a Class I River and is floatable year round with warm water.

The Jacks Fork provides some of the most natural conditions in the region with many caves and natural springs. It is a popular recreation destination for canoeists and kayakers and is generally considered a Class I-II difficulty river.

Jacks Fork has the name of John Jacks, a local Indian pioneer citizen.

== Location ==
Mouth
Confluence with the Current River, Shannon County, Missouri: 37°11′24″N 91°16′38″W
Source
Confluence of the North Prong and South Prong, Texas County, Missouri: 37°04′34″N 91°43′57″W
