= Yukon, Missouri =

Unincorporated community in Missouri, U.S.

Coordinates: 37°16′23″N 91°50′54″W

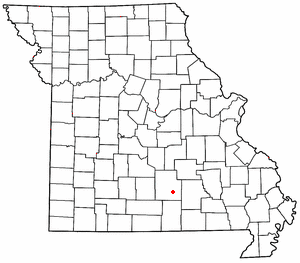
Location of Yukon in Texas County.

Yukon (/juːˈkɒn/) is an unincorporated community in eastern Texas County, Missouri, United States. It is located at the junction of Route 17 and Route 137, approximately nine miles east of Houston.

A post office called Yukon was established in 1899, and remained in operation until 1998. The community was named after the contemporaneous gold rush in Yukon, Canada.
