= Cabool, Missouri =

City in Texas County, Missouri, United States

- City
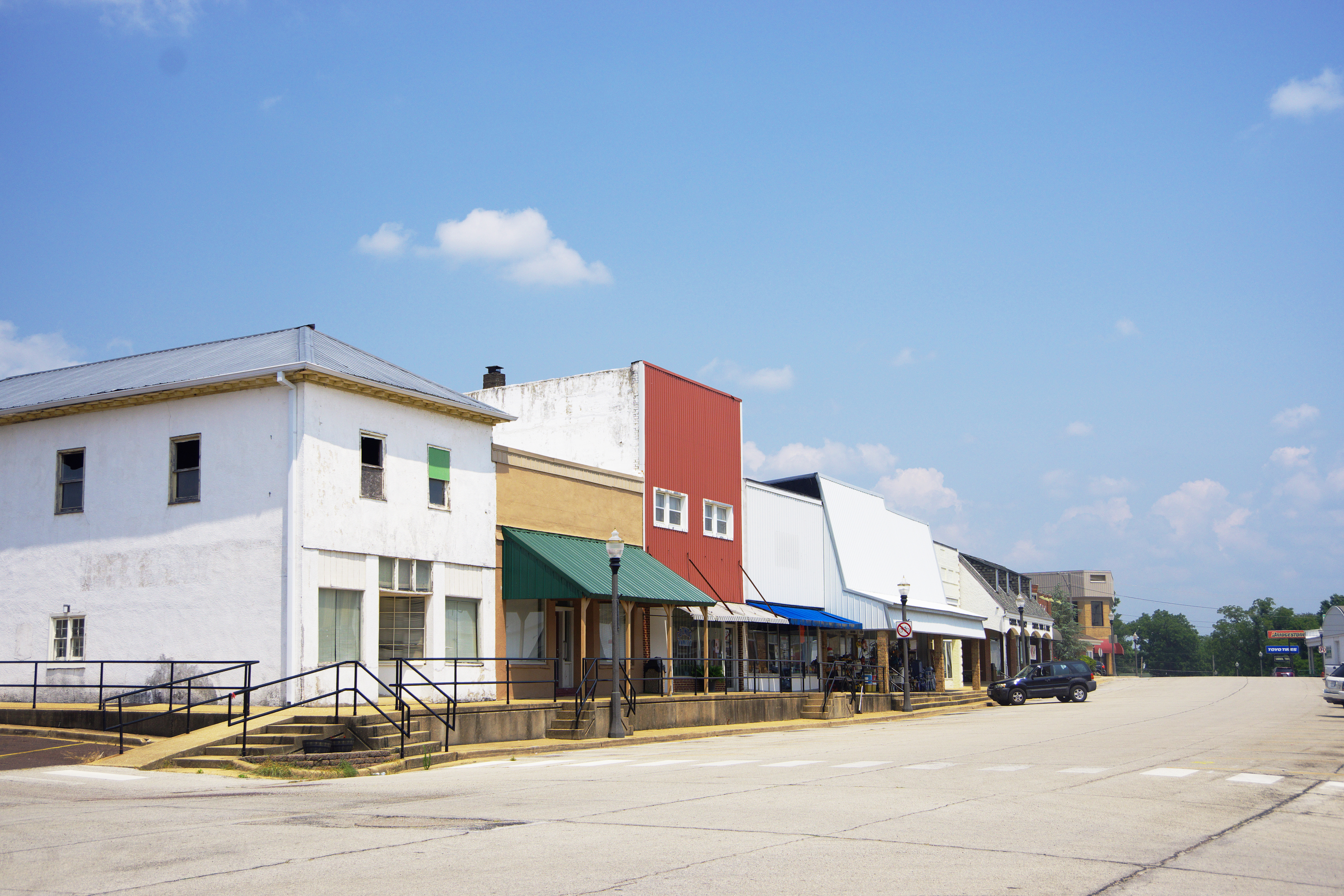
- Main Street, August 2021
- Nickname: "Kabul"
- Motto: "The Gateway to the Ozarks"
- Interactive map of Cabool, Missouri
- Coordinates: 37°07′32″N 92°06′08″W
- Country: United States
- State: Missouri
- County: Texas

Area
  - Total: 3.96 sq mi (10.26 km^{2})
  - Land: 3.90 sq mi (10.10 km^{2})
  - Water: 0.062 sq mi (0.16 km^{2})
- Elevation: 1,345 ft (410 m)

Population (2020)
  - Total: 1,946
  - Density: 498.9/sq mi (192.64/km^{2})
- Time zone: UTC-6 (Central (CST))
  - Summer (DST): UTC-5 (CDT)
- ZIP code: 65689
- Area code: 417
- FIPS code: 29-10288
- GNIS feature ID: 2393489
- Website: www.caboolmo.org

Cabool is a city in Texas County, Missouri, United States. The population was 1,946 at the 2020 census.

== Etymology ==
The city was named after Kabul, Afghanistan, using an older English spelling of the name, in 1882. The British Army had just withdrawn from Kabul at the end of the Second Anglo-Afghan War the year before. As local legend goes, one of the construction engineers who built the railroad through Cabool also worked on railroad construction in Afghanistan and thought this area of southern Texas County looked similar to the region of Kabul, Afghanistan. Prior to being called Cabool, the community was known as Cedar Bluff. It remains the only "Cabool" in the United States of America.

Old legends claim that Cabool was named after the Indian chief who lived there, whose name was "Chief Kabul" (pronounced Kay-Bull). The story continues with the narrative that Chief Kabul and his sweetheart jumped ( into the "onyx pool" ) together to their deaths off Cedar Bluff at Cabool, as their parents disapproved of their relationship. This legend was depicted in the 1903 poem Legend of Cabool, written by Tug Wilson and Ben Durnell. The yearbook at Cabool R-IV Schools is still known as the "Kabul", named for Chief Kabul.

== Geography ==
Cabool is in the Ozarks of southern Missouri. The city is located in southern Texas County at the intersection of US Routes 60 and 63 and Missouri Route 181. Mountain Grove is eight miles west, Houston is approximately fifteen miles northeast and Willow Springs is about fifteen miles to the southeast, in Howell County.

According to the United States Census Bureau, the city has a total area of 3.90 square miles (10.10 km^{2}), of which 3.84 square miles (9.95 km^{2}) is land and 0.06 square miles (0.16 km^{2}) is water.

== Demographics ==
Historical population
Census	Pop.	Note	%±
1890	359		—
1900	471		31.2%
1910	789		67.5%
1920	905		14.7%
1930	908		0.3%
1940	1,069		17.7%
1950	1,245		16.5%
1960	1,284		3.1%
1970	1,848		43.9%
1980	2,090		13.1%
1990	2,006		−4.0%
2000	2,168		8.1%
2010	2,147		−1.0%
2020	1,946		−9.4%
U.S. Decennial Census

Historically, Texas County has consistently voted for the Democratic Party in elections; however, more recently Texas County has voted mostly for Republicans.

In 2000, Cabool was the largest city in the largest geographic county (Texas County) in Missouri. The school district is the home of the "Bulldogs". Cabool High School is a historic native rock structure with the oldest buildings being constructed in 1932. At least one of the buildings on the high school campus was a project of the federal Works Projects Administration (WPA).

=== 2020 census ===
As of the 2020 census, Cabool had a population of 1,946. The median age was 42.7 years. 24.7% of residents were under the age of 18 and 22.7% of residents were 65 years of age or older. For every 100 females there were 88.4 males, and for every 100 females age 18 and over there were 83.2 males age 18 and over.

0.0% of residents lived in urban areas, while 100.0% lived in rural areas.

There were 822 households in Cabool, of which 25.1% had children under the age of 18 living in them. Of all households, 37.5% were married-couple households, 19.3% were households with a male householder and no spouse or partner present, and 36.9% were households with a female householder and no spouse or partner present. About 39.7% of all households were made up of individuals and 21.4% had someone living alone who was 65 years of age or older.

There were 991 housing units, of which 17.1% were vacant. The homeowner vacancy rate was 4.5% and the rental vacancy rate was 21.8%.

Racial composition as of the 2020 census
Race	Number	Percent
White	1,794	92.2%
Black or African American	5	0.3%
American Indian and Alaska Native	14	0.7%
Asian	7	0.4%
Native Hawaiian and Other Pacific Islander	0	0.0%
Some other race	12	0.6%
Two or more races	114	5.9%
Hispanic or Latino (of any race)	52	2.7%

=== 2010 census ===
As of the census of 2010, there were 2,146 people, 918 households, and 515 families living in the city. The population density was 558.9 inhabitants per square mile (215.8/km^{2}). There were 1,054 housing units at an average density of 274.5 per square mile (106.0/km^{2}). The racial makeup of the city was 96.4% White, 0.4% African American, 0.5% Native American, 0.6% Asian, 0.1% from other races, and 2.1% from two or more races. Hispanic or Latino of any race were 2.6% of the population.

There were 918 households, of which 31.3% had children under the age of 18 living with them, 39.8% were married couples living together, 12.7% had a female householder with no husband present, 3.6% had a male householder with no wife present, and 43.9% were non-families. 39.9% of all households were made up of individuals, and 22.9% had someone living alone who was 65 years of age or older. The average household size was 2.24 and the average family size was 3.02.

The median age in the city was 39.6 years. 26.9% of residents were under the age of 18; 7.7% were between the ages of 18 and 24; 21.2% were from 25 to 44; 22.3% were from 45 to 64; and 21.9% were 65 years of age or older. The gender makeup of the city was 47.6% male and 52.4% female.

=== 2000 census ===
As of the census of 2000, there were 2,168 people, 883 households, and 544 families living in the city. The population density was 583.7 inhabitants per square mile (225.4/km^{2}). There were 1,013 housing units at an average density of 272.7 per square mile (105.3/km^{2}). The racial makeup of the city was 95.85% White, 0.23% African American, 0.83% Native American, 0.83% Asian, 0.09% Pacific Islander, 0.23% from other races, and 1.94% from two or more races. Hispanic or Latino of any race were 1.01% of the population.

There were 883 households, out of which 31.9% had children under the age of 18 living with them, 45.0% were married couples living together, 14.2% had a female householder with no husband present, and 38.3% were non-families. 34.5% of all households were made up of individuals, and 19.9% had someone living alone who was 65 years of age or older. The average household size was 2.29 and the average family size was 2.94.

In the city, the population was spread out, with 27.2% under the age of 18, 6.5% from 18 to 24, 23.7% from 25 to 44, 18.8% from 45 to 64, and 23.9% who were 65 years of age or older. The median age was 40 years. For every 100 females there were 81.9 males. For every 100 females age 18 and over, there were 71.3 males.

The median income for a household in the city was $21,887, and the median income for a family was $29,154. Males had a median income of $26,625 versus $16,500 for females. The per capita income for the city was $13,069. About 45.0% of families and 22.4% of the population were below the poverty line, including 28.5% of those under age 18 and 18.8% of those age 65 or over.

== Education ==
Cabool R-IV School District operates one elementary school, one middle school, and Cabool High School.

Cabool has a public library, a branch of the Texas County Library.

== Notable person ==
- Willard Edwin "Fred" House (October 3, 1890 - November 16, 1923), Major League Baseball pitcher who played for the Detroit Tigers in 1913.

== See also ==
- List of cities in Missouri
