= Licking, Missouri =

City in Texas County, Missouri, United States

- City
- Location in Texas County and the state of Missouri.
- Coordinates: 37°29′57″N 91°51′42″W
- Country: United States
- State: Missouri
- County: Texas

Area
  - Total: 2.14 sq mi (5.55 km^{2})
  - Land: 2.13 sq mi (5.52 km^{2})
  - Water: 0.012 sq mi (0.03 km^{2})
- Elevation: 1,257 ft (383 m)

Population (2020)
  - Total: 2,851
  - Density: 1,338.0/sq mi (516.59/km^{2})
- Time zone: UTC-6 (Central (CST))
  - Summer (DST): UTC-5 (CDT)
- ZIP code: 65542
- Area code: 573
- FIPS code: 29-42464
- GNIS feature ID: 2395703
- Website: www.lickingmo.org

Licking is a city located in Texas County, Missouri, United States. As of the 2020 census, Licking had a population of 2,851. It is the most populous city in Texas County.

== History ==
The community was named for a mineral lick near the original town site. An early variant name was "Buffalo Lick". Licking experienced growth after the South Central Correctional Center opened in June 2000, which doubled the population from the 2000 Census to the 2010 Census. Also, a small Amish community moved from Berne, Indiana to Licking starting in 2009.

== Demographics ==
Historical population
Census	Pop.	Note	%±
1880	163		—
1900	193		—
1910	351		81.9%
1920	411		17.1%
1930	435		5.8%
1940	598		37.5%
1950	733		22.6%
1960	954		30.2%
1970	1,002		5.0%
1980	1,272		26.9%
1990	1,328		4.4%
2000	1,471		10.8%
2010	3,124		112.4%
2020	2,851		−8.7%
U.S. Decennial Census

=== 2020 census ===
As of the 2020 census, Licking had a population of 2,851. The median age was 39.2 years. 12.1% of residents were under the age of 18 and 14.2% of residents were 65 years of age or older. For every 100 females there were 281.1 males, and for every 100 females age 18 and over there were 332.8 males age 18 and over.

0.0% of residents lived in urban areas, while 100.0% lived in rural areas.

There were 595 households in Licking, of which 29.4% had children under the age of 18 living in them. Of all households, 36.5% were married-couple households, 20.7% were households with a male householder and no spouse or partner present, and 37.1% were households with a female householder and no spouse or partner present. About 40.0% of all households were made up of individuals and 22.4% had someone living alone who was 65 years of age or older.

There were 697 housing units, of which 14.6% were vacant. The homeowner vacancy rate was 6.1% and the rental vacancy rate was 6.3%.

Racial composition as of the 2020 census
Race	Number	Percent
White	2,056	72.1%
Black or African American	689	24.2%
American Indian and Alaska Native	21	0.7%
Asian	2	0.1%
Native Hawaiian and Other Pacific Islander	0	0.0%
Some other race	12	0.4%
Two or more races	71	2.5%
Hispanic or Latino (of any race)	70	2.5%

=== 2010 census ===
As of the census of 2010, there were 3,124 people, 634 households, and 397 families living in the city. The population density was 1,466.7 inhabitants per square mile (566.3/km^{2}). There were 742 housing units at an average density of 348.4 per square mile (134.5/km^{2}). The racial makeup of the city was 73.1% White, 25.6% African American, 0.6% Native American, 0.2% Asian, 0.1% from other races, and 0.4% from two or more races. Hispanic or Latino of any race were 2.2% of the population.

There were 634 households, of which 31.2% had children under the age of 18 living with them, 45.1% were married couples living together, 13.4% had a female householder with no husband present, 4.1% had a male householder with no wife present, and 37.4% were non-families. 34.2% of all households were made up of individuals, and 18% had someone living alone who was 65 years of age or older. The average household size was 2.33 and the average family size was 2.97.

The median age in the city was 35 years. 12.9% of residents were under the age of 18; 16.2% were between the ages of 18 and 24; 36.8% were from 25 to 44; 23.2% were from 45 to 64; and 10.8% were 65 years of age or older. The gender makeup of the city was 73.3% male and 26.7% female.

=== 2000 census ===
The 2000 census found that there were 1,471 people, 647 households, and 390 families living in the city. The population density was 847.8 inhabitants per square mile (327.3/km^{2}). There were 744 housing units at an average density of 428.8 per square mile (165.6/km^{2}). The demographics of the city were 97.35% White, 1.70% Hispanic, 1.09% Native American, 0.07% Asian, and 0.34% from other races as stated by census.

There were 647 households within the city. 26.6% had children under the age of 18 living with them, 42.8% were married couples living together, single-mother households account for 13.6%, and 39.7% were non-families. Single-person households make up 37.1%. Citizens over the age of 65 years make up 23.5% of households. The average household size was 2.19, and the average family size was 2.85.

Census found that 22.7% of the city population were children. Adult population represented: 8.8% from 18 to 24, 22.4% from 25 to 44, 20.1% from 45 to 64, and 26.0% who were 65 years of age or older. The average median age was 41 years.

At the time of the 2000 census, Texas County was one of the poorer counties in the state. The median income for a household in the city was $17,576, and the median income for a family was $25,625. Males had a median income of $24,643 versus $17,153 for females. The per capita income for the city was $12,802. About 20.1% of families and 25.5% of the population were below the poverty line, including 33.4% of those under age 18 and 23.4% of those age 65 or over.

== Geography ==
Licking is located in north central Texas County in the Ozarks of southern Missouri. The city is located at the intersection of U.S. Route 63 and Missouri Route 32.

According to the United States Census Bureau, the city has a total area of 2.14 square miles (5.54 km^{2}), of which 2.13 square miles (5.52 km^{2}) is land and 0.01 square miles (0.03 km^{2}) is water.

=== Climate ===
Climate data for Licking 4N, Missouri (1991–2020 normals, extremes 1936–present)
Month	Jan	Feb	Mar	Apr	May	Jun	Jul	Aug	Sep	Oct	Nov	Dec	Year
Record high °F (°C)	78 (26)	85 (29)	95 (35)	92 (33)	96 (36)	106 (41)	114 (46)	106 (41)	104 (40)	93 (34)	84 (29)	78 (26)	114 (46)
Mean maximum °F (°C)	65.7 (18.7)	70.3 (21.3)	77.6 (25.3)	83.9 (28.8)	87.9 (31.1)	92.1 (33.4)	96.9 (36.1)	97.0 (36.1)	91.2 (32.9)	83.8 (28.8)	74.4 (23.6)	66.3 (19.1)	99.0 (37.2)
Mean daily maximum °F (°C)	41.9 (5.5)	47.0 (8.3)	56.4 (13.6)	67.4 (19.7)	75.5 (24.2)	83.4 (28.6)	88.0 (31.1)	87.3 (30.7)	79.7 (26.5)	68.6 (20.3)	55.6 (13.1)	45.2 (7.3)	66.3 (19.1)
Daily mean °F (°C)	31.7 (−0.2)	36.1 (2.3)	45.0 (7.2)	55.3 (12.9)	64.5 (18.1)	72.9 (22.7)	77.3 (25.2)	76.0 (24.4)	68.0 (20.0)	56.5 (13.6)	45.0 (7.2)	35.5 (1.9)	55.3 (12.9)
Mean daily minimum °F (°C)	21.4 (−5.9)	25.2 (−3.8)	33.7 (0.9)	43.3 (6.3)	53.4 (11.9)	62.4 (16.9)	66.6 (19.2)	64.7 (18.2)	56.2 (13.4)	44.4 (6.9)	34.3 (1.3)	25.7 (−3.5)	44.3 (6.8)
Mean minimum °F (°C)	0.1 (−17.7)	4.8 (−15.1)	12.9 (−10.6)	26.8 (−2.9)	36.3 (2.4)	48.9 (9.4)	55.1 (12.8)	52.2 (11.2)	39.7 (4.3)	26.8 (−2.9)	16.8 (−8.4)	6.8 (−14.0)	−4.8 (−20.4)
Record low °F (°C)	−24 (−31)	−19 (−28)	−17 (−27)	16 (−9)	25 (−4)	36 (2)	41 (5)	38 (3)	28 (−2)	11 (−12)	−1 (−18)	−19 (−28)	−24 (−31)
Average precipitation inches (mm)	2.81 (71)	2.71 (69)	4.12 (105)	4.80 (122)	5.54 (141)	4.54 (115)	3.48 (88)	4.04 (103)	4.20 (107)	3.34 (85)	4.09 (104)	2.87 (73)	46.54 (1,182)
Average snowfall inches (cm)	3.5 (8.9)	1.7 (4.3)	2.0 (5.1)	0.0 (0.0)	0.0 (0.0)	0.0 (0.0)	0.0 (0.0)	0.0 (0.0)	0.0 (0.0)	0.0 (0.0)	0.2 (0.51)	3.6 (9.1)	11.0 (28)
Average precipitation days (≥ 0.01 in)	7.8	7.3	10.3	10.7	12.5	9.5	8.2	8.3	7.7	8.3	9.2	8.0	107.8
Average snowy days (≥ 0.1 in)	1.8	1.2	0.5	0.1	0.0	0.0	0.0	0.0	0.0	0.0	0.3	1.5	5.4
Source: NOAA

== Education ==
Licking R-VIII School District, which covers the municipality, operates one elementary school and Licking High School.

Licking has a public library, a branch of the Texas County Library.

== Notable people ==
- Miyoshi Umeki (1929–2007), actress

== See also ==
- List of cities in Missouri
