= Texas County, Missouri =

County in Missouri, United States

- County
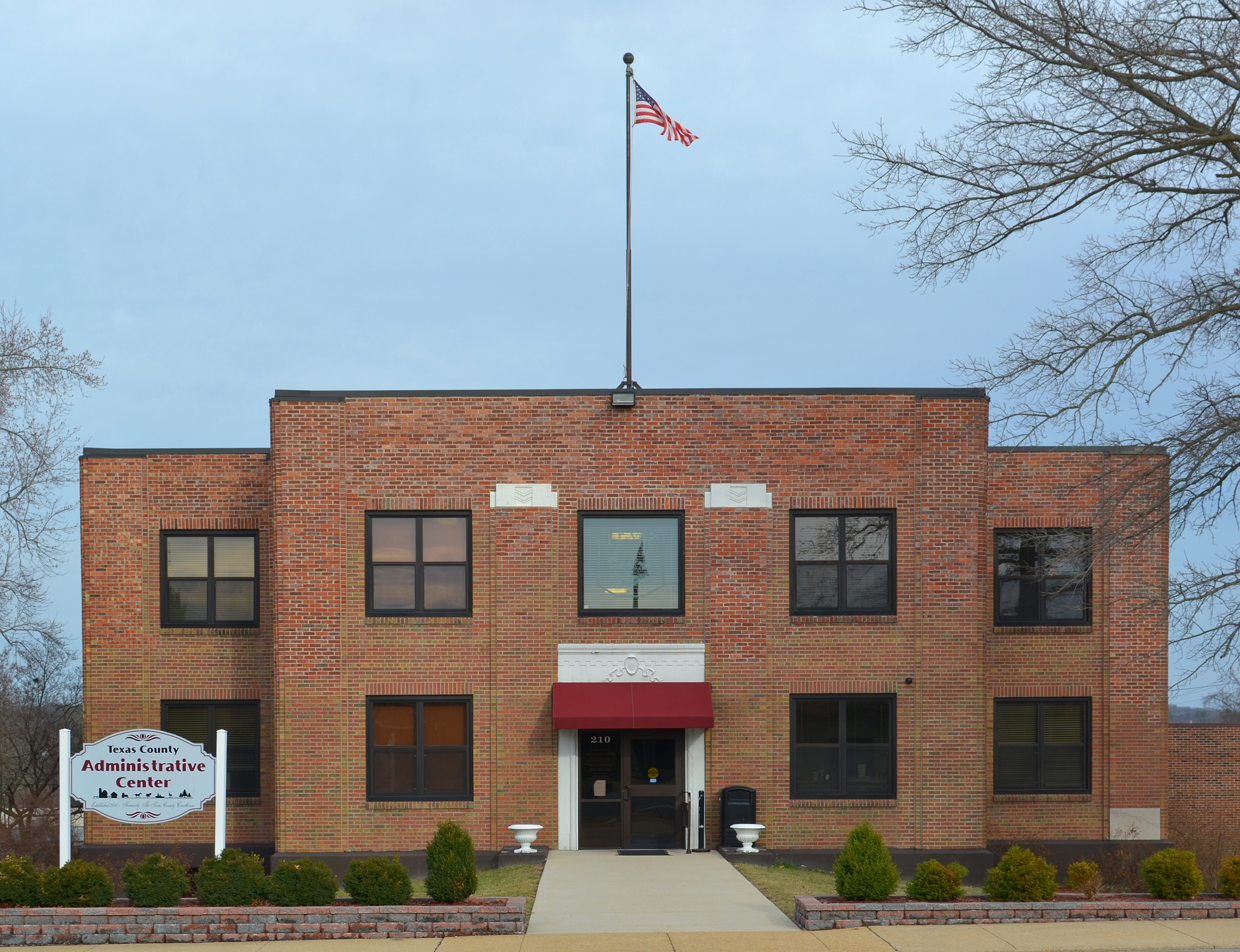
- Texas County Administrative Center

- Location within the U.S. state of Missouri
- Coordinates: 37°19′N 91°58′W
- Country: United States
- State: Missouri
- Founded: February 14, 1845
- Named for: Republic of Texas
- Seat: Houston
- Largest city: Licking

Area
  - Total: 1,179 sq mi (3,050 km^{2})
  - Land: 1,177 sq mi (3,050 km^{2})
  - Water: 2.0 sq mi (5.2 km^{2}) 0.2%

Population (2020)
  - Total: 24,487
  - Estimate (2025): 25,994 ▲
  - Density: 20.80/sq mi (8.033/km^{2})
- Time zone: UTC−6 (Central)
  - Summer (DST): UTC−5 (CDT)
- Congressional district: 8th
- Website: www.texascountymissouri.gov

Texas County is a county located in the southern portion of the U.S. state of Missouri. As of the 2020 census, the population was 24,487. Its county seat is Houston. The county was organized in 1843 as Ashley County. Its name was changed in 1845 to Texas County, after the Republic of Texas. The 2010 U.S. Census indicates that the county was the center of population for the United States.

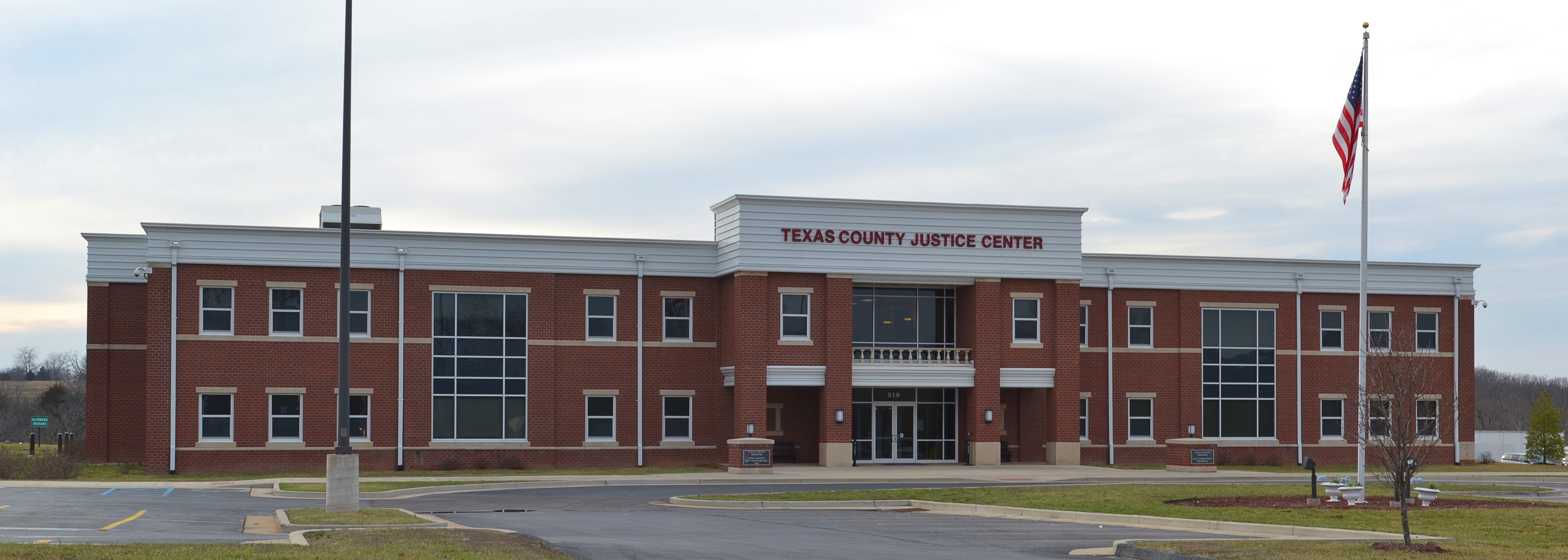
The Texas County Justice Center was completed in 2008.

== History ==
Texas County was created in 1843 and named for William H. Ashley, the first lieutenant governor of Missouri. It was later organized on February 14, 1845, when it was also renamed for the Republic of Texas.

A seat of justice for the county was laid out in 1846 near the center of the county on Brushy Creek and named Houston for the first president of the Texas Republic. The historic Texas County Courthouse, built in 1932, was the county's sixth and now serves as the county administrative center. It was remodeled in 1977 and again in 2007. A new justice center was completed in 2008.

Rugged hills, springs, creeks, rivers and caves abound in Texas County. There have been many Native American mounds found in the county. Their paintings remain upon various bluffs over ancient campsites. The area was part of the 1808 Osage Native American land cession.

Pioneers came to Texas County in the 1820s from Virginia, Kentucky, Tennessee and the Carolinas and set up sawmills along the Big Piney River. Pioneers made a nice income rafting the timber down the Piney River toward St. Louis. Some 48,000 acres (190 km^{2}) in the north and northwest part of the county is now part of the Mark Twain National Forest. Several acres in the southeast part of the county are part of the Ozark National Scenic Riverways Park. Small family farms are still a major part of the landscape of the county. The population of the first Federal Census of Texas County in 1850 was 2,312 citizens.

The American Civil War period was a time of turmoil in Texas County. The courthouse was occupied during the war by the Union Army as headquarters. Houston was an important point on the route from federal headquarters in Springfield to headquarters in Rolla. Some skirmishes were fought here. Confederate soldiers stormed the town, burning every building.

On February 26, 2015, a gunman shot and killed seven people in several locations across the town of Tyrone. The suspect was later found dead of a self-inflicted gunshot wound. It was the worst mass murder in Texas County's history. Prior to the mass shooting, the county had an average of one homicide per year.

== Geography ==
According to the U.S. Census Bureau, the county has a total area of 1,179 square miles (3,050 km^{2}), of which 1,177 square miles (3,050 km^{2}) is land and 2.0 square miles (5.2 km^{2}) (0.2%) is water. It is the largest county in Missouri by area.

=== Adjacent counties ===
- Pulaski County (north)
- Phelps County (north)
- Dent County (northeast)
- Shannon County (east)
- Howell County (south)
- Douglas County (southwest)
- Wright County (west)
- Laclede County (northwest)

=== Major highways ===
- U.S. Route 60
- U.S. Route 63
- Route 17
- Route 32
- Route 38
- Route 137

=== National protected areas ===
- Mark Twain National Forest (part)
- Ozark National Scenic Riverways (part)

== Demographics ==
Historical population
Census	Pop.	Note	%±
1850	2,812		—
1860	6,067		115.8%
1870	9,618		58.5%
1880	12,206		26.9%
1890	19,406		59.0%
1900	22,192		14.4%
1910	21,458		−3.3%
1920	20,548		−4.2%
1930	18,580		−9.6%
1940	19,813		6.6%
1950	18,992		−4.1%
1960	17,758		−6.5%
1970	18,320		3.2%
1980	21,070		15.0%
1990	21,476		1.9%
2000	23,003		7.1%
2010	26,008		13.1%
2020	24,487		−5.8%
2025 (est.)	25,994	▲	6.2%
U.S. Decennial Census; 1790-1960 1900-1990; 1990-2000 2010-2015

=== 2020 census ===
As of the 2020 census, the county had a population of 24,487. The median age was 43.5 years. 21.8% of residents were under the age of 18 and 21.4% of residents were 65 years of age or older. For every 100 females there were 109.4 males, and for every 100 females age 18 and over there were 110.4 males age 18 and over.

The racial makeup of the county was 90.8% White, 3.2% Black or African American, 0.6% American Indian and Alaska Native, 0.3% Asian, 0.0% Native Hawaiian and Pacific Islander, 0.6% from some other race, and 4.4% from two or more races. Hispanic or Latino residents of any race comprised 2.1% of the population.

0.6% of residents lived in urban areas, while 99.4% lived in rural areas.

There were 9,360 households in the county, of which 27.2% had children under the age of 18 living with them and 25.1% had a female householder with no spouse or partner present. About 28.8% of all households were made up of individuals and 15.1% had someone living alone who was 65 years of age or older.

There were 11,004 housing units, of which 14.9% were vacant. Among occupied housing units, 73.9% were owner-occupied and 26.1% were renter-occupied. The homeowner vacancy rate was 3.0% and the rental vacancy rate was 11.6%.

=== Racial and ethnic composition ===
Texas County, Missouri – Racial and ethnic composition Note: the US Census treats Hispanic/Latino as an ethnic category. This table excludes Latinos from the racial categories and assigns them to a separate category. Hispanics/Latinos may be of any race.
Race / Ethnicity (NH = Non-Hispanic)	Pop 1980	Pop 1990	Pop 2000	Pop 2010	Pop 2020	% 1980	% 1990	% 2000	% 2010	% 2020
White alone (NH)	20,880	21,203	22,034	24,010	21,992	99.10%	98.73%	95.79%	92.32%	89.81%
Black or African American alone (NH)	7	16	47	871	780	0.03%	0.07%	0.20%	3.35%	3.19%
Native American or Alaska Native alone (NH)	45	82	208	167	142	0.21%	0.38%	0.90%	0.64%	0.58%
Asian alone (NH)	31	59	78	80	65	0.15%	0.27%	0.34%	0.31%	0.27%
Native Hawaiian or Pacific Islander alone (NH)	x	x	4	7	6	x	x	0.02%	0.03%	0.02%
Other race alone (NH)	9	3	7	11	46	0.04%	0.01%	0.03%	0.04%	0.19%
Mixed race or Multiracial (NH)	x	x	404	437	941	x	x	1.76%	1.68%	3.84%
Hispanic or Latino (any race)	98	113	221	425	515	0.47%	0.53%	0.96%	1.63%	2.10%
Total	21,070	21,476	23,003	26,008	24,487	100.00%	100.00%	100.00%	100.00%	100.00%

=== 2000 census ===
As of the census of 2000, there were 23,003 people, 9,378 households, and 6,647 families residing in the county. The population density was 21 people per square mile (8.1 people/km^{2}). There were 9,378 housing units at an average density of 9 units per square mile (3.5/km^{2}). The racial makeup of the county was 96.47% White, 0.21% Black or African American, 0.96% Native American, 0.34% Asian, 0.01% Pacific Islander, 0.19% from other races, and 1.81% from two or more races. Approximately 0.96% of the population were Hispanic or Latino of any race.

There were 9,378 households, out of which 30.80% had children under the age of 18 living with them, 58.10% were married couples living together, 8.90% had a female householder with no husband present, and 29.10% were non-families. 26.00% of all households were made up of individuals, and 13.20% had someone living alone who was 65 years of age or older. The average household size was 2.42 and the average family size was 2.89.

Age spread: 24.90% under the age of 18, 7.10% from 18 to 24, 24.90% from 25 to 44, 25.30% from 45 to 64, and 17.80% who were 65 years of age or older. The median age was 40 years. For every 100 females there were 93.50 males. For every 100 females age 18 and over, there were 90.10 males.

The median income for a household in the county was $29,260, and the median income for a family was $34,503. Males had a median income of $25,071 versus $17,126 for females. The per capita income for the county was $16,568. About 16.50% of families and 21.40% of the population were below the poverty line, including 29.10% of those under age 18 and 17.20% of those age 65 or over.

=== Religion ===
According to the Association of Religion Data Archives County Membership Report (2000), Texas County is a part of the Bible Belt with evangelical Protestantism being the majority religion. The most predominant denominations among residents in Texas County who adhere to a religion are Southern Baptists (77.46%), Christian Churches & Churches of Christ (20.65%), and National Association of Free Will Baptists (12.92%).

== Politics ==
=== Local ===
Texas County, Missouri

Elected countywide officials
Assessor	Debbie James	Republican
Circuit Clerk	Erin Smith	Republican
County Clerk	Peggy Seyler	Republican
Commissioner (presiding)	Scott Long	Republican
Commissioner (district 1)	John Casey	Republican
Commissioner (district 2)	Robert Ross	Republican
Coroner	Brent Honeycutt	Republican
Prosecuting Attorney	Parke Stevens	Republican
Public Administrator	Tina Garrett	Republican
Recorder	Lindsay Koch	Republican
Sheriff	Scott Lindsey	Republican
Surveyor	Chuck Manier	Republican
Treasurer/Collector	Tammy Cantrell	Democratic

The Republican Party mostly controls politics at the local level in Texas County. Republicans hold all but one of the elected positions in the county.

=== State ===
All of Texas County is in the 142nd district in the Missouri House of Representatives, which is currently represented by Robert Ross (R-Yukon).

Missouri House of Representatives — District 142 — Texas County (2016)
Party	Candidate	Votes	%	±%
Republican	Robert Ross	8,786	82.27%	−17.73
Democratic	Bobby Johnston, Jr.	1,894	17.73%	+17.73

Missouri House of Representatives — District 142 — Texas County (2014)
Party	Candidate	Votes	%	±%
Republican	Robert Ross	4,541	100.00%	

Missouri House of Representatives — District 142 — Texas County (2012)
Party	Candidate	Votes	%	±%
Republican	Robert Ross	9,145	100.00%	

All of Texas County is a part of Missouri's 33rd District in the Missouri Senate and is currently represented by Mike Cunningham (R-Rogersville).

Missouri Senate — District 33 — Texas County (2016)
Party	Candidate	Votes	%	±%
Republican	Mike Cunningham	9,605	100.00%	

Missouri Senate — District 33 — Texas County (2012)
Party	Candidate	Votes	%	±%
Republican	Mike Cunningham	8,997	100.00%	

Past Gubernatorial Elections Results
Year	Republican	Democratic	Third Parties
2024	83.20% 9,491	14.78% 1,686	2.02% 231
2020	81.94% 9,239	15.92% 1,795	2.15% 242
2016	69.86% 7,659	26.61% 2,918	3.53% 387
2012	54.06% 5,831	42.97% 4,635	2.98% 321
2008	43.40% 4,688	54.14% 5,848	2.46% 265
2004	60.32% 6,644	37.92% 4,177	1.76% 193
2000	50.73% 5,030	47.49% 4,709	1.78% 176
1996	48.50% 4,558	48.19% 4,528	3.31% 311
1992	45.96% 4,544	54.04% 5,343	0.00% 0
1988	65.59% 5,644	33.47% 2,880	0.94% 81
1984	63.38% 5,866	36.62% 3,390	0.00% 0
1980	52.96% 4,932	46.91% 4,369	0.13% 12
1976	47.71% 3,804	52.21% 4,163	0.09% 7

=== Federal ===
U.S. Senate — Missouri — Texas County (2016)
Party	Candidate	Votes	%	±%
Republican	Roy Blunt	7,619	69.68%	+19.77
Democratic	Jason Kander	2,829	25.87%	−16.60
Libertarian	Jonathan Dine	262	2.40%	−5.22
Green	Johnathan McFarland	96	0.88%	+0.88
Constitution	Fred Ryman	129	1.18%	+1.18

U.S. Senate — Missouri — Texas County (2012)
Party	Candidate	Votes	%	±%
Republican	Todd Akin	5,340	49.91%	
Democratic	Claire McCaskill	4,544	42.47%	
Libertarian	Jonathan Dine	816	7.62%	

Texas County is included in Missouri's 8th Congressional District and is currently represented by Jason T. Smith (R-Salem) in the U.S. House of Representatives. Smith won a special election on Tuesday, June 4, 2013, to finish out the remaining term of U.S. Representative Jo Ann Emerson (R-Cape Girardeau). Emerson announced her resignation a month after being reelected with over 70 percent of the vote in the district. She resigned to become CEO of the National Rural Electric Cooperative.

U.S. House of Representatives — Missouri's 8th Congressional District — Texas County (2016)
Party	Candidate	Votes	%	±%
Republican	Jason T. Smith	8,826	81.68%	+7.92
Democratic	Dave Cowell	1,696	15.70%	−3.27
Libertarian	Jonathan Shell	283	2.62%	+0.77

U.S. House of Representatives — Missouri's 8th Congressional District — Texas County (2014)
Party	Candidate	Votes	%	±%
Republican	Jason T. Smith	3,877	73.76%	+2.45
Democratic	Barbara Stocker	997	18.97%	−3.10
Libertarian	Rick Vandeven	97	1.85%	−0.10
Constitution	Doug Enyart	89	1.69%	−2.98
Independent	Terry Hampton	196	3.73%	+3.73

U.S. House of Representatives — Missouri's 8th Congressional District — Special Election — Texas County (2013)
Party	Candidate	Votes	%	±%
Republican	Jason T. Smith	1,648	71.31%	−4.74
Democratic	Steven Hodges	510	22.07%	+2.79
Libertarian	Bill Slantz	45	1.95%	−2.72
Constitution	Doug Enyart	108	4.67%	+4.67

U.S. House of Representatives — Missouri's 8th Congressional District — Texas County (2012)
Party	Candidate	Votes	%	±%
Republican	Jo Ann Emerson	8,080	76.05%	
Democratic	Jack Rushin	2,048	19.28%	
Libertarian	Rick Vandeven	496	4.67%	

==== Political culture ====
United States presidential election results for Texas County, Missouri
Year	Republican		Democratic		Third party(ies)	
Year	No.	%	No.	%	No.	%
1888	1,161	35.13%	1,797	54.37%	347	10.50%
1892	1,294	36.48%	1,878	52.95%	375	10.57%
1896	1,785	39.86%	2,672	59.67%	21	0.47%
1900	1,713	43.02%	2,218	55.70%	51	1.28%
1904	1,801	44.77%	2,118	52.65%	104	2.59%
1908	1,954	44.61%	2,328	53.15%	98	2.24%
1912	1,232	30.58%	2,067	51.30%	730	18.12%
1916	1,809	42.92%	2,291	54.35%	115	2.73%
1920	3,552	53.94%	2,965	45.03%	68	1.03%
1924	2,787	43.55%	3,421	53.45%	192	3.00%
1928	4,050	56.78%	3,067	43.00%	16	0.22%
1932	2,621	34.15%	4,996	65.09%	58	0.76%
1936	4,132	46.51%	4,718	53.11%	34	0.38%
1940	4,730	51.20%	4,497	48.67%	12	0.13%
1944	3,916	49.33%	4,011	50.53%	11	0.14%
1948	3,320	41.53%	4,664	58.34%	10	0.13%
1952	4,824	52.29%	4,372	47.39%	29	0.31%
1956	4,352	49.13%	4,506	50.87%	0	0.00%
1960	5,258	59.32%	3,606	40.68%	0	0.00%
1964	2,902	37.03%	4,934	62.97%	0	0.00%
1968	4,022	49.53%	3,117	38.39%	981	12.08%
1972	5,104	65.09%	2,737	34.91%	0	0.00%
1976	3,338	41.63%	4,638	57.84%	42	0.52%
1980	4,879	52.41%	4,261	45.77%	169	1.82%
1984	5,591	60.42%	3,662	39.58%	0	0.00%
1988	4,584	53.91%	3,887	45.71%	32	0.38%
1992	3,470	34.70%	4,597	45.97%	1,934	19.34%
1996	4,065	43.06%	3,897	41.28%	1,478	15.66%
2000	6,136	61.78%	3,486	35.10%	310	3.12%
2004	7,234	65.66%	3,664	33.25%	120	1.09%
2008	7,215	66.49%	3,410	31.43%	226	2.08%
2012	7,618	70.77%	2,871	26.67%	275	2.55%
2016	8,875	81.01%	1,728	15.77%	353	3.22%
2020	9,478	83.76%	1,716	15.17%	121	1.07%
2024	9,855	85.51%	1,589	13.79%	81	0.70%

At the presidential level, Texas County is Republican-leaning. George W. Bush carried Texas County by two-to-one margins in 2000 and 2004. Bill Clinton was the last Democratic presidential nominee to carry Texas County, in 1992, and like many of the rural counties throughout Missouri, Texas County strongly favored John McCain over Barack Obama in 2008.

Like most rural areas throughout Southeast Missouri, voters in Texas County generally adhere to socially and culturally conservative principles which tend to influence their Republican leanings. In 2004, Missourians voted on a constitutional amendment to define marriage as the union between a man and a woman—it overwhelmingly passed Texas County with 85.63 percent of the vote. The initiative passed the state with 71 percent of support from voters as Missouri became the first state to ban same-sex marriage. In 2006, Missourians voted on a constitutional amendment to fund and legalize embryonic stem cell research in the state—it failed in Texas County with 61.13 percent voting against the measure. The initiative narrowly passed the state with 51 percent of support from voters as Missouri became one of the first states in the nation to approve embryonic stem cell research. Despite Texas County's longstanding tradition of supporting socially conservative platforms, voters in the county have a penchant for advancing populist causes like increasing the minimum wage. In 2006, Missourians voted on a proposition (Proposition B) to increase the minimum wage in the state to $6.50 an hour—it passed Texas County with 72.03 percent of the vote. The proposition strongly passed every single county in Missouri with 78.99 percent voting in favor as the minimum wage was increased to $6.50 an hour in the state. During the same election, voters in five other states also strongly approved increases in the minimum wage.

== Education ==
Of adults 25 years of age and older in Texas County, 71.4% possesses a high school diploma or higher while 10.8% hold a bachelor's degree or higher as their highest educational attainment.

K-12 school districts in the county, including those based in other counties with portions of this county, include:

- Cabool R-IV School District
- Houston R-I School District
- Licking R-VIII School District
- Mountain Grove R-III School District
- Mountain View-Birch Tree R-III School District
- Plato R-V School District
- Summersville R-II School District
- Willow Springs R-IV School District

There are also two elementary school districts: Raymondville R-VII School District and Success R-VI School District.

=== Public schools ===
- Cabool R-IV School District – Cabool
  - Cabool Elementary School (PK–4)
  - Cabool Middle School (5–8)
  - Cabool High School (9–12)
- Houston R-I School District – Houston
  - Houston Elementary School (PK–5)
  - Houston Middle School (6–8)
  - Houston High School (9–12)
- Licking R-VIII School District – Licking
  - Licking Elementary School (PK–6)
  - Licking High School (7–12)
- Plato R-V School District – Plato
  - Plato Elementary School (PK–5)
  - Plato High School (6–12)
- Raymondville R-VII School District – Raymondville
  - Raymondville Elementary School (PK–8)
- Success R-VI School District – Success
  - Success Elementary School (K–8)
- Summersville R-II School District – Summersville
  - Summersville Elementary School (K–6)
  - Summersville High School (7–12)

=== Private schools ===
- Wellspring Christian School – Houston – (5–8) – Non-denominational Christian

=== Alternative and vocational schools ===
- Exceptional Child Cooperative – Houston – (K–12) – Special Education
- Gentry Residential Treatment Facility – Cabool (6–12) – Alternative

=== Public libraries ===
- Texas County Library

== Communities ==
=== Cities ===
- Cabool
- Houston (county seat)
- Licking
- Mountain Grove (partly in Wright County)
- Summersville (partly in Shannon County)

=== Villages ===
- Plato
- Raymondville

=== Unincorporated communities ===
- Alice
- Arroll
- Ashley Creek
- Bado
- Bendavis
- Big Creek
- Bucyrus
- Clara
- Clear Springs
- Dent
- Dunn
- Dykes
- Elk Creek
- Ellis Prairie
- Ellsworth
- Eunice
- Evening Shade
- Fowler
- Guild
- Hartshorn
- Huggins
- Kimble
- Kinderpost
- Ladd
- Lundy
- Mahan
- Maples
- Mitchells Corner
- Nile
- Oscar
- Pleasant Ridge
- Prescott
- Roby
- Samoa
- Sargent
- Sherrill
- Simmons
- Solo
- Stultz
- Success
- Tyrone
- Upton
- Vada
- Varvol
- Venable
- Yukon

=== Townships ===
The original townships have been used for census purposes.

- Boone
- Burdine
- Carroll
- Cass
- Clinton
- Current
- Date
- Jackson
- Lynch
- Morris
- Ozark
- Pierce
- Piney
- Roubidoux
- Sargent
- Sherrill
- Upton

== Notable people ==
- Kenneth Lay, founder, CEO and chairman of Enron Corporation
- Claire McCaskill, US Senator from Missouri
- Emmett Kelly, circus performer
- Orville Tuttle, professional American football player

== See also ==
- National Register of Historic Places listings in Texas County, Missouri
