= Houston, Missouri =

City in Missouri, U.S.

- City
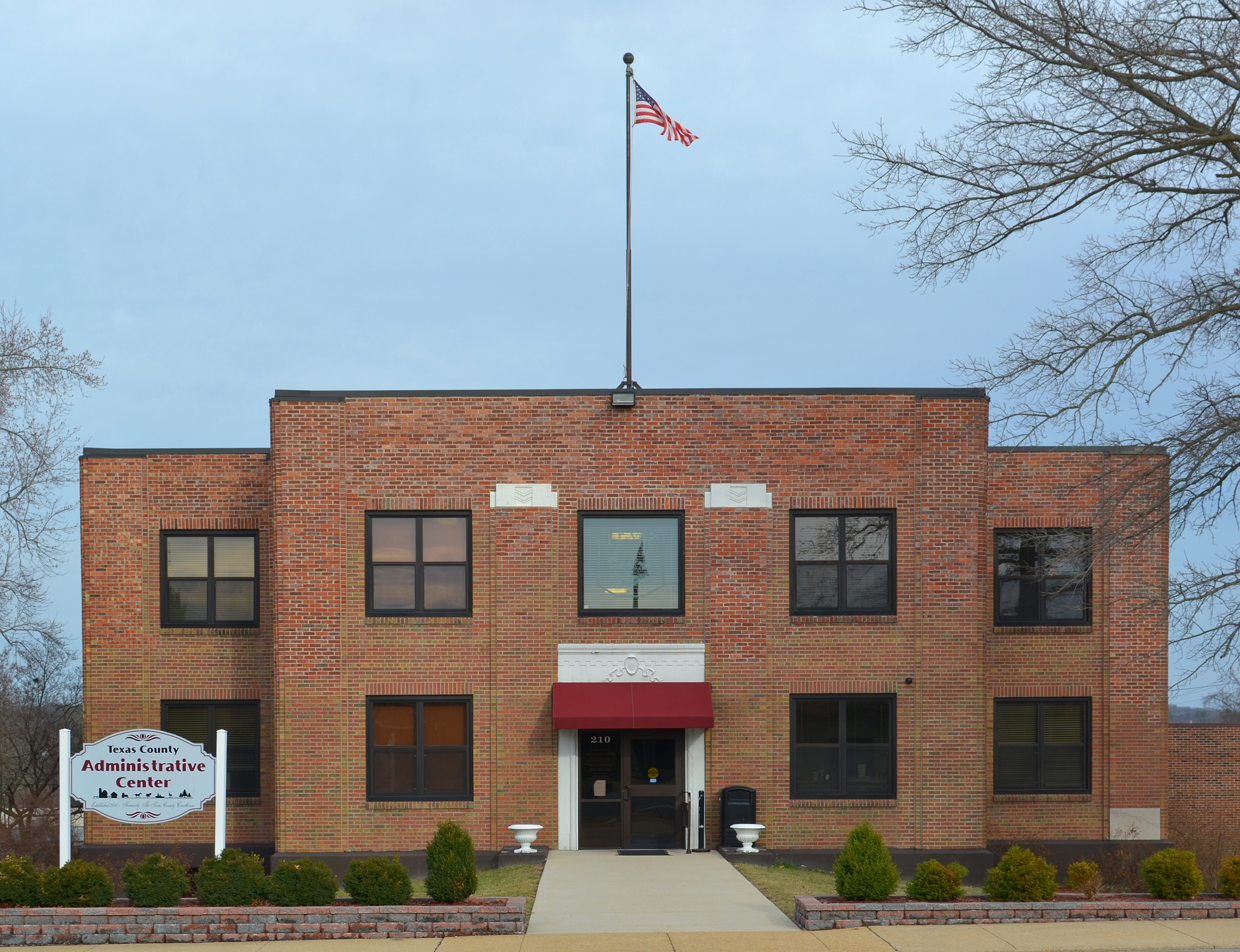
- Texas County Administrative Center

- Location of Houston, Missouri
- Coordinates: 37°19′34″N 91°57′22″W
- Country: United States
- State: Missouri
- County: Texas

Government
  - Mayor: Sam Kelley

Area
  - Total: 3.64 sq mi (9.44 km^{2})
  - Land: 3.64 sq mi (9.43 km^{2})
  - Water: 0.0039 sq mi (0.01 km^{2})
- Elevation: 1,201 ft (366 m)

Population (2020)
  - Total: 2,079
  - Density: 570.7/sq mi (220.36/km^{2})
- Time zone: UTC-6 (Central (CST))
  - Summer (DST): UTC-5 (CDT)
- ZIP code: 65483
- Area code: 417
- FIPS code: 29-33238
- GNIS feature ID: 2394426
- Website: houstonmo.org

Houston is a city in and the county seat of Texas County, Missouri, United States. The population was 2,079 at the 2020 census.

== History ==
Houston was founded in 1857 and was named after Sam Houston.

During the Civil War, Houston was sometimes defended by units of the 5th Missouri State Militia.

The Arthur W. and Chloe B. Cole House, Houston High School, and Houston Ranger Station Historic District are listed on the National Register of Historic Places.

== Demographics ==
Historical population
Census	Pop.	Note	%±
1880	191		—
1890	355		85.9%
1900	514		44.8%
1910	644		25.3%
1920	772		19.9%
1930	690		−10.6%
1940	820		18.8%
1950	1,277		55.7%
1960	1,660		30.0%
1970	2,178		31.2%
1980	2,157		−1.0%
1990	2,118		−1.8%
2000	1,992		−5.9%
2010	2,081		4.5%
2020	2,079		−0.1%
U.S. Decennial Census

=== 2020 census ===
As of the 2020 census, Houston had a population of 2,079. The median age was 41.1 years. 21.6% of residents were under the age of 18 and 22.8% of residents were 65 years of age or older. For every 100 females there were 84.3 males, and for every 100 females age 18 and over there were 80.6 males age 18 and over.

0.0% of residents lived in urban areas, while 100.0% lived in rural areas.

There were 907 households in Houston, of which 26.0% had children under the age of 18 living in them. Of all households, 33.4% were married-couple households, 20.5% were households with a male householder and no spouse or partner present, and 39.8% were households with a female householder and no spouse or partner present. About 41.0% of all households were made up of individuals and 19.2% had someone living alone who was 65 years of age or older.

There were 1,055 housing units, of which 14.0% were vacant. The homeowner vacancy rate was 6.0% and the rental vacancy rate was 10.8%.

Racial composition as of the 2020 census
Race	Number	Percent
White	1,911	91.9%
Black or African American	11	0.5%
American Indian and Alaska Native	16	0.8%
Asian	16	0.8%
Native Hawaiian and Other Pacific Islander	0	0.0%
Some other race	31	1.5%
Two or more races	94	4.5%
Hispanic or Latino (of any race)	81	3.9%

=== 2010 census ===
As of the census of 2010, there were 2,081 people, 935 households, and 513 families living in the city. The population density was 571.7 inhabitants per square mile (220.7/km^{2}). There were 1,060 housing units at an average density of 291.2 per square mile (112.4/km^{2}). The racial makeup of the city was 96.3% White, 0.2% African American, 0.6% Native American, 0.4% Asian, 0.5% from other races, and 1.9% from two or more races. Hispanic or Latino of any race were 1.2% of the population.

There were 935 households, of which 28.4% had children under the age of 18 living with them, 37.4% were married couples living together, 13.6% had a female householder with no husband present, 3.9% had a male householder with no wife present, and 45.1% were non-families. 41.0% of all households were made up of individuals, and 21.2% had someone living alone who was 65 years of age or older. The average household size was 2.08 and the average family size was 2.78.

The median age in the city was 41.9 years. 21.7% of residents were under the age of 18; 8.4% were between the ages of 18 and 24; 22.3% were from 25 to 44; 22.7% were from 45 to 64; and 24.7% were 65 years of age or older. The gender makeup of the city was 44.0% male and 56.0% female.

=== 2000 census ===
As of the census of 2000, there were 1,992 people, 904 households, and 536 families living in the city. The population density was 559.8 inhabitants per square mile (216.1/km^{2}). There were 1,042 housing units at an average density of 292.8 per square mile (113.1/km^{2}). The racial makeup of the city was 96.13% White, 0.20% African American, 0.80% Native American, 0.30% Asian, 0.35% from other races, and 2.21% from two or more races. Hispanic or Latino of any race were 1.46% of the population.

There were 904 households, out of which 25.3% had children under the age of 18 living with them, 43.6% were married couples living together, 12.3% had a female householder with no husband present, and 40.6% were non-families. 37.7% of all households were made up of individuals, and 22.6% had someone living alone who was 65 years of age or older. The average household size was 2.07 and the average family size was 2.67.

In the city, the population was spread out, with 20.7% under the age of 18, 7.4% from 18 to 24, 22.2% from 25 to 44, 22.3% from 45 to 64, and 27.4% who were 65 years of age or older. The median age was 45 years. For every 100 females, there were 73.7 males. For every 100 females age 18 and over, there were 69.1 males.

The median income for a household in the city was $20,886, and the median income for a family was $28,798. Males had a median income of $26,371 versus $17,500 for females. The per capita income for the city was $14,977. About 20.6% of families and 26.2% of the population were below the poverty line, including 34.9% of those under age 18 and 19.8% of those age 65 or over.

== Geography ==
Houston is located in the Missouri Ozarks in central Texas County, at the intersection of U.S. Route 63 and Missouri Route 17. Cabool is approximately 15 miles to the southwest and Licking about 12 miles to the northeast on route 63.

According to the United States Census Bureau, the city has a total area of 3.64 square miles (9.43 km^{2}), all land. Houston is the second-largest city in Texas County, behind Cabool. It is located south of Rolla.

=== Climate ===
Climate data for Houston, Missouri (1991–2020 normals, extremes 1893–present)
Month	Jan	Feb	Mar	Apr	May	Jun	Jul	Aug	Sep	Oct	Nov	Dec	Year
Record high °F (°C)	76 (24)	85 (29)	88 (31)	92 (33)	97 (36)	105 (41)	111 (44)	107 (42)	106 (41)	95 (35)	90 (32)	77 (25)	111 (44)
Mean daily maximum °F (°C)	42.5 (5.8)	47.5 (8.6)	56.8 (13.8)	67.5 (19.7)	75.3 (24.1)	82.6 (28.1)	87.1 (30.6)	86.2 (30.1)	79.1 (26.2)	68.5 (20.3)	56.1 (13.4)	45.7 (7.6)	66.2 (19.0)
Daily mean °F (°C)	33.4 (0.8)	37.6 (3.1)	46.1 (7.8)	56.4 (13.6)	64.8 (18.2)	72.9 (22.7)	76.9 (24.9)	75.6 (24.2)	68.0 (20.0)	56.8 (13.8)	46.0 (7.8)	36.7 (2.6)	55.9 (13.3)
Mean daily minimum °F (°C)	24.3 (−4.3)	27.8 (−2.3)	35.5 (1.9)	45.3 (7.4)	54.2 (12.3)	63.2 (17.3)	66.7 (19.3)	65.0 (18.3)	56.8 (13.8)	45.1 (7.3)	35.9 (2.2)	27.6 (−2.4)	45.6 (7.6)
Record low °F (°C)	−34 (−37)	−31 (−35)	−9 (−23)	15 (−9)	26 (−3)	35 (2)	42 (6)	38 (3)	23 (−5)	11 (−12)	0 (−18)	−15 (−26)	−34 (−37)
Average precipitation inches (mm)	2.74 (70)	2.51 (64)	3.79 (96)	5.03 (128)	5.43 (138)	4.22 (107)	3.76 (96)	4.27 (108)	4.17 (106)	3.53 (90)	4.39 (112)	2.95 (75)	46.79 (1,188)
Average snowfall inches (cm)	1.6 (4.1)	0.6 (1.5)	0.5 (1.3)	0.0 (0.0)	0.0 (0.0)	0.0 (0.0)	0.0 (0.0)	0.0 (0.0)	0.0 (0.0)	0.0 (0.0)	0.3 (0.76)	0.7 (1.8)	3.7 (9.4)
Average precipitation days (≥ 0.01 in)	7.0	7.5	8.9	9.6	11.4	8.6	7.4	7.4	6.6	7.3	8.4	7.0	97.1
Average snowy days (≥ 0.1 in)	1.5	0.9	0.2	0.0	0.0	0.0	0.0	0.0	0.0	0.0	0.2	1.0	3.8
Source: NOAA

== Education ==
Houston R-I School District operates one elementary school, one middle school, and Houston High School.

Houston has a public library, a branch of the Texas County Library.

== Emmett Kelly ==
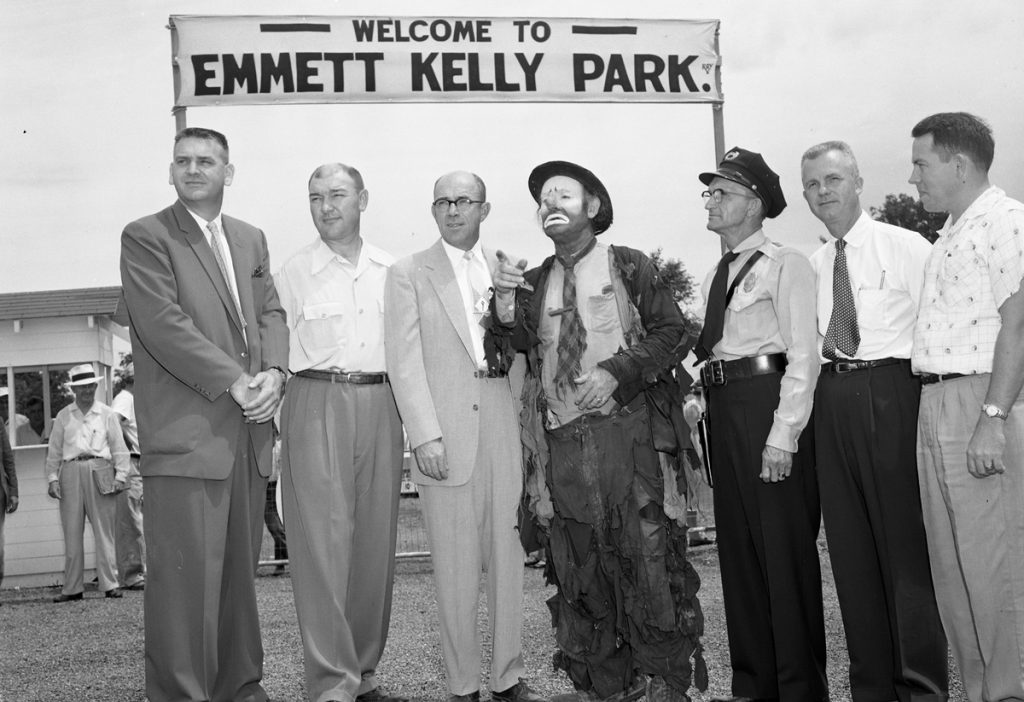
Emmett Kelly (center) with Houston City leaders, Aug 9, 1956.

Houston's most famous resident was Emmett Kelly, who became an internationally known clown. Kelly was born December 9, 1898, and as a young child he and his family moved to a farm in Houston from his birthplace of Sedan, Kansas. Kelly attended his first circus performances in the summer of 1909 when both the Mighty Haag and M.L. Clark and Son's circuses appeared in the area.

In 1917, Kelly moved to Kansas City, as an aspiring newspaper cartoonist. It was there that he created the cartoon character of a tramp who later became known around the world as "Weary Willie". While living in Kansas City, Kelly began working for carnivals and circuses and trained as a trapeze artist.

In August 1920, Kelly returned to his adopted hometown of Houston, Missouri where he appeared as a "cartoonist and comedy specialist" at the town's annual "Old Settlers Reunion".

After a successful career as a trapeze artist with the John Robinson Circus, Kelly was hired in 1932 by the Hagenbeck-Wallace circus as a clown. It was there that he first began performing as "Weary Willie," a sad-faced character who would become known around the world. After performing with the Cole Bros. Circus and Ringling Bros. and Barnum & Bailey Kelly took the character to Hollywood where he appeared in numerous films and on network television programs and advertisements.

=== Honors ===
On August 9, 1956, the Kelly family visited Houston when the town renamed the open area where the "Old Settlers Reunion" had taken place "Emmett Kelly Park" in his honor. Nineteen years later Kelly returned to Houston for a final time when Governor Kit Bond recognized Houston's former resident by declaring October 9, 1975, as "Emmett Kelly Day" in Missouri. Since 1988, the annual "Emmett Kelly Clown Festival" has attracted clowns from across the region, including Kelly's grandson, Joey Kelly, who returned to perform as a special guest in 2007. Although the festival ended its original 21-year run in May 2008, it returned in April 2022 with Kelly's daughter Stasia.

Kelly was inducted into the Circus Ring of Fame in Sarasota, Florida, in 1988 and International Circus Hall of Fame in Peru, Indiana, in 1994. On May 1, 1996, a bust of Kelly was dedicated in the "Hall of Famous Missourians" at the state capitol in Jefferson City, Missouri.

== See also ==
- List of cities in Missouri
