= Dove Creek (Missouri) =

Stream in the American state of Missouri

Location
- Country: United States
- State: Missouri
- Region: Wright County

Physical characteristics
- Source
  - coordinates: 37°12′25″N 92°17′45″W
- Mouth
  - coordinates: 37°18′13″N 92°23′27″W
  - elevation: 1,073 ft (327 m)

Dove Creek is a stream in the Wright County, Missouri. It is a tributary of Whetstone Creek.

The headwaters arise about five miles north of Mountain Grove just west of Missouri Route 95. The stream flows NNW roughly parallel to Route 95 past Dawson and turns west just east of Rayborn then flows under Missouri Route 38 just west of Rayborn. It continues west parallel to Route 38 to its confluence with Whetstone Creek about one half mile south of the confluence of Whetstone Creek with the Gasconade River.

Dove Creek was so named due to the presence of doves near its course.

== See also ==
- List of rivers of Missouri
