= List of United States tornadoes in April 2018 =

This page documents all tornadoes confirmed by various weather forecast offices of the National Weather Service in the United States in April 2018. Tornado counts are considered preliminary until final publication in the database of the National Centers for Environmental Information.

== United States yearly total ==
Confirmed tornadoes by Enhanced Fujita rating
EFU	EF0	EF1	EF2	EF3	EF4	EF5	Total
15	619	399	76	12	0	0	1,121

== April ==
Confirmed tornadoes by Enhanced Fujita rating
EFU	EF0	EF1	EF2	EF3	EF4	EF5	Total
1	43	70	14	1	0	0	129

=== April 3 event ===
List of confirmed tornadoes – Tuesday, April 3, 2018 (Note: All dates are based on the local time zone where the tornado touched down; however, all times are in Coordinated Universal Time for consistency.)
EF#	Location	County / Parish	State	Start Coord.	Time (UTC)	Path length	Max width
EF1	Beavercreek Township to SW of Clifton	Greene	OH	39.7473°N 83.971°W	20:45–20:50	8.75 mi (14.08 km)	200 yd (180 m)
EF1	This rain-wrapped tornado passed north of Xenia. The first point of damage was at a farm, where a house sustained roof damage, two barns were significantly damaged, and several trees were snapped or uprooted. Numerous other homes saw partial roof removal and damage to their windows, chimneys, fences, or exteriors. Additional barns were damaged or destroyed, a large camper was rolled, and five sheep were killed at a sheep farm. A silo collapsed as well.						
EF1	WNW of Selma to W of South Charleston	Clark	OH	39.7948°N 83.7592°W	20:56–20:59	4.3 mi (6.9 km)	150 yd (140 m)
EF1	One barn was destroyed while a second sustained damage to exterior walls. One building had a significant portion of its roof lifted off and blown into a nearby field. Multiple other buildings were damaged, including a two-story home that had its shutters removed.						
EF0	SW of London	Madison	OH	39.8588°N 83.4949°W	21:14–21:15	0.2 mi (0.32 km)	50 yd (46 m)
EF0	Several barns sustained complete roof removal and the collapse of their exterior walls.						
EF2	SE of Vandalia to NW of Mason	Fayette, Effingham	IL	38.8877°N 88.9976°W	21:20–21:41	18.2 mi (29.3 km)	100 yd (91 m)
EF2	Near Vandalia, this strong tornado ripped the roof and east-facing exterior wall off of a two-story home, and completely destroyed a nearby well-built garage. A one-story home in this area lost much of its roof, and a small cottage-type home was left with only a few walls standing. A mobile home and two barns were completely destroyed with the debris scattered hundreds of yards. Three silos were destroyed, two of which were thrown a full mile. Greenhouses and several other barns were damaged, and a camping trailer was overturned. Near Mason, a house had windows blown out and two trailers were overturned. Several barns, outbuildings, grain bins, and a garage were damaged or destroyed before the tornado dissipated. Many large trees were snapped and twisted along the path, and power poles were snapped.						
EF1	Grove City	Franklin	OH	39.8588°N 83.0829°W	21:37–21:41	2.63 mi (4.23 km)	75 yd (69 m)
EF1	Eight wooden utility poles were snapped at the base and numerous trees were damaged in Grove City. Multiple townhouses had partial removal of roofing, garage doors pushed in, chimneys blown off, and some damage to exterior walls. Many other homes sustained minor roof and siding damage, and a detached garage was completely destroyed.						
EF0	S of Thornville	Perry	OH	39.8452°N 82.4391°W	22:14–22:17	1.25 mi (2.01 km)	50 yd (46 m)
EF0	Three pull-behind campers were tossed, a single-wide trailer was shifted off its foundation, and another trailer sustained roof damage, with debris blown through its windows. An outbuilding had its roof ripped off. Several trees were snapped or uprooted.						
EF1	Carterville to E of Whiteash	Williamson	IL	37.7616°N 89.0737°W	22:17–22:33	9.98 mi (16.06 km)	125 yd (114 m)
EF1	One to two dozen homes sustained damage, mainly to their roofs and siding. A business in the town of Energy sustained destruction of its roof structure and had its windows blown out, while a nearby business also sustained roof and window damage. Several barns, sheds, and outbuildings sustained roof damage. Hundreds of trees were damaged, and several power poles were snapped.						
EF0	ENE of Covington	Fountain	IN	40.1525°N 87.3217°W	22:30–22:33	2.36 mi (3.80 km)	75 yd (69 m)
EF0	A few large tree branches were downed and a large trash dumpster was blown over.						
EF1	NNE of Pittsburg	Williamson	IL	37.7845°N 88.85°W	22:39–22:42	1.93 mi (3.11 km)	150 yd (140 m)
EF1	At least six homes sustained shingle loss, and one had its windows blown out. A couple of barns had partial roof loss, a fence was blown over, and dozens of trees were snapped.						
EF2	SW of Galatia to NE of Raleigh	Williamson, Saline	IL	37.8071°N 88.7347°W	22:47–23:07	12.35 mi (19.88 km)	350 yd (320 m)
EF2	Two frame homes had their roofs torn off, one of which sustained partial exterior wall collapse. A mobile home was completely destroyed, and another mobile home was overturned and severely damaged. Over a dozen more homes sustained damage, including to their shingles and siding. Dozens of barns, grain bins, and other outbuildings were heavily damaged or destroyed, and hundreds of trees were snapped or uprooted, some of which landed on structures and vehicles.						
EF0	SE of Penermon	Stoddard	MO	36.7302°N 89.8065°W	22:58–23:04	4.49 mi (7.23 km)	100 yd (91 m)
EF0	A house had the top part of its chimney broken off, sustained partial loss of metal roof covering, and had several windows broken. Another residence lost a few of its shingles. Two barns had portions of their metal roofing and walls blown off, a garage sustained loss of shingles and had a large entry door blown in, and several trees were snapped. Several wooden power poles were partially blown over.						
EF1	SSE of Arbyrd	Dunklin	MO	36.0022°N 90.2311°W	23:06–23:15	6.7 mi (10.8 km)	200 yd (180 m)
EF1	Storage buildings, trees, power poles, and center pivot irrigation systems were damaged. A few residences sustained roof or shingle damage.						
EF0	SW of Buck Creek	Tippecanoe	IN	40.46°N 86.7893°W	23:11–23:12	0.64 mi (1.03 km)	40 yd (37 m)
EF0	A barn's skylights were blown out, an outbuilding had a wall collapsed and half of its roof removed, and tree branches were downed, including one that broke a garage window. The top horizontal portion of a power pole was broken.						
EF1	NW of Matthews	New Madrid	MO	36.7691°N 89.6413°W	23:14–23:17	2.55 mi (4.10 km)	125 yd (114 m)
EF1	A large farm implement building was completely destroyed, and four barns or garages sustained damage. A grain bin was blown in on one side, farm implements were overturned or tossed, and several trees were broken. A home had the roof of its rear porch ripped off, a window broken, and large sections of shingles removed.						
EF1	N of Metropolis	Massac	IL	37.1759°N 88.7551°W	23:29–23:43	10.59 mi (17.04 km)	75 yd (69 m)
EF1	Numerous buildings sustained shingle damage, and several tree limbs were snapped. A grain bin was destroyed, and most of the metal roof was blown off a barn.						
EF1	NE of New Haven	White	IL	37.9512°N 88.0651°W	23:38–23:42	2.25 mi (3.62 km)	225 yd (206 m)
EF1	Farm irrigation piping and other equipment was tossed and damaged. An irrigation center pivot system and a semi-tank trailer were overturned. Three barns lost metal roofing, and dozens of trees were snapped or uprooted.						
EF1	NW of Leitchfield	Grayson	KY	37.5201°N 86.3349°W	23:52–23:53	0.5 mi (0.80 km)	100 yd (91 m)
EF1	Multiple large metal outbuildings were damaged or destroyed, and minor roof damage occurred along the tornado's path. Trees were snapped or uprooted.						
EF2	N of Burna	Livingston	KY	37.2461°N 88.392°W	23:54–00:00	4.32 mi (6.95 km)	300 yd (270 m)
EF2	Dozens of trees were snapped or uprooted, one of which fell on and killed a horse. A well-built two-story home was twisted off of its basement foundation. All basement walls were cracked, part of the roof was lifted, and part of an exterior wall was ripped off, with furniture sucked out of the house and scattered into the yard. Four vehicles were destroyed, including one that was rolled 50 ft (17 yd). A few outbuildings were destroyed as well.						
EF1	NW of Clinton	Hickman	KY	36.7086°N 89.0355°W	00:09–00:10	0.32 mi (0.51 km)	100 yd (91 m)
EF1	A roof was lifted off a barn, a house had its metal roof peeled back, and trees were snapped or uprooted. One rotten tree fell on a mobile home, destroying the structure.						
EF1	NE of Clinton	Hickman	KY	36.7416°N 88.9192°W	00:17–00:18	0.32 mi (0.51 km)	75 yd (69 m)
EF1	A chicken barn had all of its walls blown out.						
EF1	N of Wingo	Graves	KY	36.6945°N 88.7265°W	00:36–00:38	0.82 mi (1.32 km)	75 yd (69 m)
EF1	Some trees were damaged or uprooted, tin from a barn roof was lofted into a nearby field, and an unoccupied mobile home was slid about 4 ft (1.3 yd) off its foundation, with its walls destroyed but remainder of the structure intact.						
EF1	WSW of Danville	Boyle	KY	37.633°N 84.8798°W	01:34–01:35	0.5 mi (0.80 km)	100 yd (91 m)
EF1	Numerous barns were damaged or destroyed. Fencing was destroyed, a grain silo was damaged, and an antique horse sled was moved about 10 ft (3.3 yd). One home had its roof blown off, while a second suffered significant roof, gutter, and siding damage. A hoop barn near the second house was severely damaged, and some trees were snapped or uprooted.						

=== April 6 event ===
List of confirmed tornadoes – Friday, April 6, 2018
EF#	Location	County / Parish	State	Start Coord.	Time (UTC)	Path length	Max width
EF0	WNW of Tallulah	Madison	LA	32.473°N 91.3297°W	23:05–23:07	1.14 mi (1.83 km)	25 yd (23 m)
EF0	A brief tornado was videoed over open fields; no damage was found.						
EF0	SSE of Richwood	Richland	LA	32.3146°N 91.98°W	23:40–23:53	7.85 mi (12.63 km)	50 yd (46 m)
EF0	Numerous large tree limbs were broken.						
EF2	W of Armistead to ESE of Coushatta	DeSoto, Red River	LA	32.0137°N 93.4824°W	00:31–01:02	10.13 mi (16.30 km)	1,800 yd (1,600 m)
EF2	Numerous trees were snapped or uprooted and many utility poles were snapped by this strong wedge tornado. Several metal buildings, outbuildings, and a farm irrigation systems were heavily damaged or destroyed. A large metal-framed carport and barn were destroyed at a home, and a gas station canopy was blown away.						
EFU	W of Oakalla	Burnet	TX	30.98°N 98.02°W	00:51–00:54	0.59 mi (0.95 km)	50 yd (46 m)
EFU	A trained storm spotter reported a tornado. No damage occurred.						
EF0	NW of Pelahatchie	Rankin	MS	32.3694°N 89.8975°W	01:03–01:08	2.65 mi (4.26 km)	25 yd (23 m)
EF0	Several large tree branches were snapped and power lines were downed.						
EF1	S of Delta	Warren	MS	32.2203°N 90.9637°W	01:12–01:22	2.82 mi (4.54 km)	75 yd (69 m)
EF1	Multiple trees or tree limbs were snapped.						
EF1	SE of Natchez	Natchitoches	LA	32.6073°N 92.9872°W	02:14–02:18	0.72 mi (1.16 km)	50 yd (46 m)
EF1	This tornado caused shingle damage to a home, slid a pick-up truck backward 10 ft (3.3 yd), and flipped an SUV onto its roof. The historic Jones-Roque house suffered partial removal of its metal roof. Numerous pecan trees were snapped or uprooted, and a wooden electrical pole was snapped.						
EF1	S of Pattison	Clairborne	MS	31.8491°N 90.8805°W	02:27–02:29	1.17 mi (1.88 km)	360 yd (330 m)
EF1	Trees were snapped or uprooted.						
EF1	SE of Port Gibson	Claiborne	MS	31.8392°N 90.8241°W	02:32–02:40	5.82 mi (9.37 km)	880 yd (800 m)
EF1	Widespread tree damage occurred. Many power lines were broken or snapped, some homes had their tin roofs peeled back or were damaged by fallen trees, and an 18-wheeler tractor trailer was overturned.						
EF1	WSW of Hazlehurst	Copiah	MS	31.8262°N 90.7006°W	02:46–02:49	2.37 mi (3.81 km)	700 yd (640 m)
EF1	Many trees and large limbs were snapped or uprooted.						
EF1	E of New Hebron	Jefferson Davis	MS	31.7399°N 89.9365°W	04:01–04:09	4.66 mi (7.50 km)	350 yd (320 m)
EF1	Numerous trees were snapped or uprooted.						
EF1	SW of Mount Olive	Jefferson Davis, Covington	MS	31.7233°N 89.7583°W	04:18–04:23	2.9 mi (4.7 km)	440 yd (400 m)
EF1	Many trees were snapped or uprooted, a small tractor trailer was overturned, and a home suffered minor shingle damage.						
EF1	N of Collins	Covington	MS	31.7066°N 89.582°W	04:33–04:37	1.74 mi (2.80 km)	125 yd (114 m)
EF1	A home sustained minor shingle damage, and numerous trees were snapped or uprooted.						

=== April 7 event ===
List of confirmed tornadoes – Saturday, April 7, 2018
EF#	Location	County / Parish	State	Start Coord.	Time (UTC)	Path length	Max width
EF1	SW of DeRidder	Beauregard	LA	30.8495°N 93.4594°W	06:17–06:30	7.94 mi (12.78 km)	1,000 yd (910 m)
EF1	This large tornado downed many trees and power lines. Some fallen trees caused damage to homes and barns.						
EF1	SE of DeRidder	Beauregard	LA	30.7830°N 93.2684°W	06:36–06:37	1.21 mi (1.95 km)	600 yd (550 m)
EF1	Trees were snapped or uprooted.						
EF1	SE of DeRidder	Beauregard	LA	30.7674°N 93.1762°W	06:44–06:55	8.92 mi (14.36 km)	1,200 yd (1,100 m)
EF1	Several homes were damaged by tornadic winds or fallen trees. A mobile home also lost most of its roof as result of this large tornado.						
EF0	WSW of Oberlin	Allen	LA	30.5919°N 92.8357°W	07:14–07:15	0.45 mi (0.72 km)	100 yd (91 m)
EF0	Several trees were downed and a small shed was damaged.						
EF1	E of Paulina	St. James	LA	30.0307°N 90.7584°W	10:18–10:20	1.25 mi (2.01 km)	50 yd (46 m)
EF1	A metal building was destroyed, numerous trees were snapped or uprooted, and metal roof covering was ripped from a home. Further along the path, a second home lost the entirety of its roof.						
EF0	ESE of Dublin	Laurens	GA	32.4958°N 82.7102°W	22:18–22:19	0.73 mi (1.17 km)	50 yd (46 m)
EF0	Several trees were snapped and uprooted.						
EF0	E of Taber	Bingham	ID	43.32°N 112.5703°W	00:30–00:38	0.5 mi (0.80 km)	10 yd (9.1 m)
EF0	Brief tornado near U.S. Route 26 tossed tree limbs and tumbleweeds into the air.						

=== April 10 event ===
List of confirmed tornadoes – Tuesday, April 10, 2018
EF#	Location	County / Parish	State	Start Coord.	Time (UTC)	Path length	Max width
EF0	Fort Lauderdale	Broward	FL	26.1284°N 80.1344°W	19:34–19:58	3.47 mi (5.58 km)	60 yd (55 m)
EF0	A weak tornado touched down in downtown Fort Lauderdale, toppling construction fencing and barriers. Several streets were littered with tree debris, and trash cans were thrown. It crossed Port Everglades as a waterspout before continuing into the Atlantic Ocean and dissipating.						
EF0	Fort Lauderdale–Hollywood International Airport	Broward	FL	26.080°N 80.160°W	20:25–20:36	3.21 mi (5.17 km)	40 yd (37 m)
EF0	A second tornado touched down at the Fort Lauderdale at the Hollywood International Airport, damaging carports and storage containers at the FedEx facility on the airfield. A jet bridge on the northern side of the airport terminal sustained minor damage before the tornado passed through the southern end of Port Everglades, where multiple cargo containers were overturned and portable toilets were tossed. The tornado crossed into the Atlantic Ocean before dissipating.						

=== April 13 event ===
List of confirmed tornadoes – Friday, April 13, 2018
EF#	Location	County / Parish	State	Start Coord.	Time (UTC)	Path length	Max width	Summary
EF2	NNE of Rudy to Mountainburg	Crawford	AR	35.5490°N 94.2621°W	21:04–21:19	11.7 mi (18.8 km)	1,000 yd (910 m)	A multiple-vortex wedge tornado touched down near Rudy and moved north-northeast before tracking into Mountainburg, where significant damage to structures occurred. Along its path, several homes were severely damaged, numerous outbuildings were completely destroyed, power poles were downed, and many trees were snapped or uprooted. Several cars were rolled off Arkansas Highway 282 and Interstate 49. Four people were injured.
EF1	E of Lavaca	Sebastian, Franklin	AR	35.3300°N 94.1006°W	22:46–22:54	5.6 mi (9.0 km)	400 yd (370 m)	Trees were uprooted, power poles were snapped, and a mobile home was damaged.
EF1	N of Calhoun	Ouachita	LA	32.5294°N 92.3642°W	23:34–23:38	1.72 mi (2.77 km)	600 yd (550 m)	Numerous trees and power lines were snapped or uprooted. Several houses and barn suffered severe damage, and a mobile home was flipped.
EF1	E of Downsville	Union	LA	32.5839°N 92.3258°W	23:43–23:49	3.94 mi (6.34 km)	950 yd (870 m)	Many trees were snapped or uprooted.
EF1	NW of Ozone	Johnson	AR	35.6662°N 93.4634°W	23:48–23:54	4.96 mi (7.98 km)	250 yd (230 m)	Numerous trees were snapped or uprooted in the Ozark–St. Francis National Forest. A power pole was snapped as well.
EF1	WNW of Sterlington	Union	LA	32.7131°N 92.2190°W	00:04–00:06	0.38 mi (0.61 km)	200 yd (180 m)	A brief tornado snapped or uprooted trees.
EF2	W of Umpire	Howard	AR	34.2555°N 94.067°W	00:10–00:20	2.2 mi (3.5 km)	350 yd (320 m)	Many trees were snapped or uprooted by this large multiple-vortex tornado. A metal barn was destroyed, while a second had portions of its tin roof peeled back. Two large chicken houses suffered significant roof damage, and numerous power poles were snapped.
EF2	Macomb to NNE of Norwood	Wright	MO	37.0944°N 92.4922°W	00:13–00:23	9 mi (14 km)	100 yd (91 m)	This tornado touched down in Macomb before moving to the northeast and reaching high-end EF2 strength. A one-story home was destroyed, losing its roof and some exterior walls. Numerous trees were snapped or uprooted, and outbuildings were damaged.
EF2	WNW of Clarks	Caldwell	LA	32.0150°N 92.2693°W	00:33–00:43	4.11 mi (6.61 km)	340 yd (310 m)	A strong tornado moved through the Catahoula National Wildlife Refuge, snapping and uprooting numerous trees. Several outbuildings and campsites were severely damaged by falling trees, and power poles were snapped.
EF1	W of Dawson	Wright	MO	37.2543°N 92.3271°W	00:35–00:40	5 mi (8.0 km)	75 yd (69 m)	Trees and outbuildings were damaged.
EF0	W of Pencil Bluff	Montgomery	AR	34.6296°N 93.8257°W	00:51–00:52	0.65 mi (1.05 km)	100 yd (91 m)	Trees were uprooted.
EF1	SW of Success	Texas	MO	37.3844°N 92.1495°W	01:00–01:02	1.44 mi (2.32 km)	50 yd (46 m)	A roof, a carport, and outbuilding were damaged, and trees were snapped.
EF1	WNW of Licking	Texas	MO	37.5234°N 91.9248°W	01:20–01:25	5.54 mi (8.92 km)	50 yd (46 m)	Numerous trees were snapped or uprooted. A house and a vacant mobile home were damaged.
EF1	W of Gamaliel	Baxter	AR	36.4193°N 92.2605°W	01:45–01:46	0.5 mi (0.80 km)	150 yd (140 m)	A church, a garage, and outbuildings sustained damage. Several trees were snapped or uprooted.
EF0	W of Rayville	Richland	LA	32.4512°N 91.8276°W	02:00–02:06	3.19 mi (5.13 km)	400 yd (370 m)	Several large tree branches were broken.
EF0	SW of Oppelo	Conway	AR	35.0808°N 92.8024°W	02:13–02:14	0.16 mi (0.26 km)	100 yd (91 m)	Several trees were snapped or uprooted.
EF1	WNW of Pioneer	Morehouse, West Carroll	LA	32.7593°N 91.607°W	02:46–02:50	1.9 mi (3.1 km)	200 yd (180 m)	An unoccupied building had portions of its metal roof ripped off, and multiple trees were uprooted or had their branches snapped.
EF0	SE of El Paso	White	AR	35.0921°N 92.0340°W	03:13–03:14	0.09 mi (0.14 km)	80 yd (73 m)	Some trees were snapped or uprooted, and an outbuilding lost its metal roof.
EF1	SE of Diana	Gregg, Harrison	TX	32.6345°N 94.7436°W	04:04–04:13	4.35 mi (7.00 km)	580 yd (530 m)	Several trees were snapped or uprooted, one of which landed on a shed. The roof was lifted off a hay storage shed.
EF0	SSW of Waskom to SE of Greenwood	Harrison, Caddo	TX, LA	32.3869°N 94.1053°W	04:50–05:04	10.47 mi (16.85 km)	100 yd (91 m)	In Texas, tree limbs were snapped and the roof was blown off a small barn. In Louisiana, the tornado downed power lines and snapped or uprooted trees before dissipating.

=== April 14 event ===
List of confirmed tornadoes – Saturday, April 14, 2018
EF#	Location	County / Parish	State	Start Coord.	Time (UTC)	Path length	Max width	Summary
EF1	SW of Shreveport to N of Princeton	Caddo, Bossier	LA	32.4521°N 93.8531°W	05:10–05:41	22.54 mi (36.27 km)	1,100 yd (1,000 m)	1 death – This large tornado touched down southwest of Shreveport and moved directly into the city, inflicting roof damage to three hotels and damaging a few billboard signs. It snapped or uprooted numerous trees in and around the downtown area before crossing into Bossier City. There, a shopping center sustained collapse of an east-facing wall, and several mobile homes were damaged by falling trees. In the Red Chute area, a tree fell onto a travel trailer and killed a two-year-old child inside. Extensive tree damage occurred further along the path before the tornado dissipated.
EF0	Sarepta	Bossier, Webster	LA	32.8586°N 93.5162°W	05:42–05:48	5.11 mi (8.22 km)	300 yd (270 m)	Many trees were snapped or uprooted along the path, including in Sarepta.
EF1	NW of Shongaloo	Webster	LA	32.9417°N 93.3165°W	05:58–06:04	2.93 mi (4.72 km)	500 yd (460 m)	Considerable tree damage was observed.
EF1	NW of Homer	Claiborne	LA	32.8095°N 93.1295°W	06:11–06:19	6.85 mi (11.02 km)	1,000 yd (910 m)	Numerous trees were snapped or uprooted by this large tornado.
EF2	E of Bryceland	Bienville	LA	32.4459°N 92.9053°W	06:47–06:53	5.38 mi (8.66 km)	210 yd (190 m)	A house had most of its roof torn off, two barns were completely destroyed, and numerous trees were snapped or uprooted.
EF1	SE of El Dorado	Union	AR	33.1095°N 92.6548°W	06:51–07:00	7.13 mi (11.47 km)	800 yd (730 m)	The roofs of several houses were damaged, a travel trailer was rolled and destroyed, and a number of mobile homes suffered roof damage as well. Many trees were snapped or uprooted.
EF1	S of Grambling to Ruston	Lincoln	LA	32.4827°N 92.7249°W	07:00–07:08	6.45 mi (10.38 km)	470 yd (430 m)	Numerous trees were snapped or uprooted. Many homes had their metal roofs peeled away or were damaged by fallen trees.
EF1	E of El Dorado	Union	AR	33.1878°N 92.5317°W	07:03–07:09	5.11 mi (8.22 km)	1,200 yd (1,100 m)	This large tornado downed many trees, with some trees landing on structures and causing damage. The roofs of a number of homes, mobile homes, and barns were damaged.
EF1	Choudrant	Lincoln	LA	32.5336°N 92.5386°W	07:14–07:21	4.6 mi (7.4 km)	865 yd (791 m)	Trees were snapped or uprooted in and around Choudrant.
EF1	SE of Downsville	Lincoln, Ouachita, Union	LA	32.5754°N 92.4159°W	07:24–07:34	7.31 mi (11.76 km)	1,545 yd (1,413 m)	A large tornado snapped or uprooted many trees, including a 100-year-old tree that landed on a home.
EF1	S of Crossett	Ashley	AR	33.017°N 92.0066°W	07:42–07:47	2.72 mi (4.38 km)	600 yd (550 m)	Many large trees were snapped or uprooted, some of which landed on homes and caused significant damage. Several other houses sustained shingle damage as well.
EF1	E of Crossett	Ashley	AR	33.1205°N 91.8961°W	07:53–07:58	4.05 mi (6.52 km)	300 yd (270 m)	A significant number of trees were snapped or uprooted, and a few small sheds were damaged.
EF1	E of Mer Rouge	Morehouse	LA	32.7693°N 91.7307°W	08:21–08:25	3.18 mi (5.12 km)	200 yd (180 m)	A small shed was blown across a road, another shed was destroyed, and a third shed was damaged. A mobile home sustained damage to its roof and skirting, and a farm outbuilding had its front facade pushed in and had substantial loss of roof panels. Trees were snapped or uprooted, and a fence was toppled.
EF2	NNE of Portland	Ashley, Chicot	AR	33.267°N 91.5019°W	08:22–08:34	8.88 mi (14.29 km)	700 yd (640 m)	A silo had its top ripped off and structure bent, and power poles were snapped. A travel trailer was destroyed, a house lost most of its roof, and a couple of businesses sustained mostly minor damage. Several other homes and mobile homes sustained less severe damage, and numerous trees were snapped or uprooted along the path.
EF0	WNW of Forest	West Carroll	LA	32.8095°N 91.5677°W	08:33–08:36	2.38 mi (3.83 km)	200 yd (180 m)	A barn sustained roof damage, multiple trees were damaged, and a storage shed was destroyed. Another small storage shed was turned on its side and pushed over against a mobile home.
EF0	WNW of Pioneer	West Carroll	LA	32.8616°N 91.5219°W	08:36–08:42	4.42 mi (7.11 km)	200 yd (180 m)	Multiple trees were snapped or uprooted. A mobile home sustained roof damage.
EF1	SE of Abbeville	Lafayette	MS	34.4462°N 89.4618°W	09:48–09:49	0.8 mi (1.3 km)	150 yd (140 m)	Three small outbuildings were destroyed. The roofs of several homes and farm buildings were damaged. Several trees were uprooted.
EF0	ENE of Oxford	Lafayette	MS	34.3862°N 89.4628°W	09:49–09:50	0.5 mi (0.80 km)	40 yd (37 m)	Several trees were uprooted, and minor roof damage to homes occurred.
EF1	SW of Grand Prairie	St. Landry	LA	30.6423°N 92.1904°W	11:03–11:05	1.25 mi (2.01 km)	580 yd (530 m)	One home had its roof destroyed while several others suffered minor damage. Multiple trees were snapped.
EF2	N of Carencro	Lafayette	LA	30.3459°N 92.048°W	11:37–11:40	4.13 mi (6.65 km)	650 yd (590 m)	Numerous homes and businesses were damaged, a large advertising billboard was toppled, and multiple trees were downed. A metal outbuilding and an RV were rolled.
EF1	N of Flowood	Rankin	MS	32.3341°N 90.1065°W	12:44–12:55	6.21 mi (9.99 km)	50 yd (46 m)	A tornado caused scattered damage near the Jackson–Medgar Wiley Evers International Airport, mainly to the roofs of homes. Trees were snapped and uprooted as well.
EF0	ENE of Oak Hills Place	East Baton Rouge	LA	30.3893°N 91.0616°W	13:13–13:15	1.5 mi (2.4 km)	50 yd (46 m)	The doors of several metal buildings were bent or blown in; minor roof damage occurred as well. Several trees were downed.
EF0	N of Greensburg	St. Helena	LA	30.9703°N 90.7013°W	13:20–13:21	0.08 mi (0.13 km)	20 yd (18 m)	Two large trees were uprooted while a third was twisted and snapped.
EF0	NW of Arcola	St. Helena, Tangipahoa	LA	30.7988°N 90.613°W	13:35–13:40	6.15 mi (9.90 km)	120 yd (110 m)	Large trees were uprooted, some shingles were ripped from a house, and small canopies and trampolines were mangled.
EF0	E of Arcola	Tangipahoa	LA	30.7811°N 90.5375°W	13:38–13:40	3.6 mi (5.8 km)	25 yd (23 m)	Small trees sustained minor damage.
EF0	S of Bayou Vista	St. Mary	LA	29.6816°N 91.2742°W	14:13–14:14	0.3 mi (0.48 km)	40 yd (37 m)	A hotel had a section of its roof uplifted, and multiple windows were broken.
EF1	SW of Noxapater	Winston	MS	32.9569°N 89.1021°W	14:23–14:25	0.81 mi (1.30 km)	150 yd (140 m)	Some tin was ripped from a large shed, several trees were snapped or uprooted, and part of the roof was ripped from a home.
EF1	ESE of Columbia	Lamar	MS	31.1644°N 89.6325°W	15:07–15:15	6.08 mi (9.78 km)	200 yd (180 m)	Trees were snapped along the path.
EF0	SE of Starkville	Oktibbeha	MS	33.3303°N 88.7621°W	15:08–15:10	2.17 mi (3.49 km)	200 yd (180 m)	A metal awning was damaged and some boats were tossed at a marina. A couple of trees were downed, including one that fell on a house.
EF2	Meridian	Lauderdale	MS	32.3558°N 88.7321°W	15:43–15:53	8.49 mi (13.66 km)	780 yd (710 m)	This damaging tornado developed along the leading edge of a squall line and moved directly through Meridian. A two-story apartment building had its roof torn off, power poles were snapped, and a building at Magnolia Middle School had a large portion of its roof removed. A one-story home had its roof torn off and sustained collapse of its front exterior wall, and other homes and structures in town sustained roof and facade damage. Numerous trees were snapped or uprooted, some of which landed on homes. Two people were injured.
EF0	Carriere	Pearl River	MS	30.6207°N 89.6539°W	16:30–16:31	0.19 mi (0.31 km)	25 yd (23 m)	A piece of a gas station awning in town was ripped off and thrown, striking a vehicle. Several tree limbs were broken, and a bank building had an awning ripped off and flung into nearby treetops.
EF0	Long Beach	Harrison	MS	30.3436°N 89.1427°W	19:09–19:10	0.61 mi (0.98 km)	75 yd (69 m)	A small multiple-vortex tornado began over the Gulf of Mexico as a waterspout before moving ashore at Long Beach. A shed had its roof blown off and two tall-masted sail boats were toppled over at a harbor.
EF1	NW of Vancleave	Jackson	MS	30.65°N 88.76°W	23:18–23:28	1.91 mi (3.07 km)	50 yd (46 m)	Trees were snapped and a shed was destroyed.
EF1	St. Martin	Jackson	MS	30.4419°N 88.8597°W	23:19–23:22	1.36 mi (2.19 km)	75 yd (69 m)	A shopping center sustained considerable roof, window, and exterior wall damage. Vehicles were flipped and piled atop each other in the parking lot, while a restaurant and power lines sustained damage as well.
EF1	NNW of Wade	Jackson	MS	30.68°N 88.58°W	23:39–23:40	0.27 mi (0.43 km)	25 yd (23 m)	Several trees were snapped.

=== April 15 event ===
List of confirmed tornadoes – Sunday, April 15, 2018
EF#	Location	County / Parish	State	Start Coord.	Time (UTC)	Path length	Max width	Summary
EF0	NW of Mexico Beach	Bay	FL	30.0087°N 85.5206°W	11:09–11:13	1.13 mi (1.82 km)	60 yd (55 m)	A brief tornado touched down on the eastern portion of Tyndall Air Force Base, damaging pine trees and utility lines.
EF1	Eastern Ausmac	Decatur	GA	30.9838°N 84.6355°W	12:55–12:56	0.46 mi (0.74 km)	31 yd (28 m)	A brief tornado snapped multiple trees in the eastern part of Ausmac.
EF2	E of Gilbert	Lexington	SC	33.9101°N 81.3645°W	18:03–18:07	2.98 mi (4.80 km)	200 yd (180 m)	Numerous large trees were snapped, twisted, or uprooted, and power poles were snapped. Vehicles, two campers, and a group of seven chicken houses were severely damaged.
EF0	Northeastern Lexington	Lexington	SC	34.011°N 81.2106°W	18:15–18:16	0.43 mi (0.69 km)	100 yd (91 m)	This brief tornado touched down in a residential area of Lexington. Numerous trees were snapped and uprooted, some of which fell on homes and vehicles.
EF1	Southern Irmo	Lexington	SC	34.0364°N 81.1798°W	18:16–18:18	2.33 mi (3.75 km)	150 yd (140 m)	Numerous trees were snapped and uprooted in the southern part of Irmo, some of which fell on homes and vehicles.
EF1	NNE of Ridgeway	Fairfield	SC	34.4152°N 80.9199°W	18:46–18:50	4.18 mi (6.73 km)	100 yd (91 m)	Numerous trees were snapped or uprooted, several of which fell on homes.
EF0	SW of Lake Wylie	York	SC	35.0851°N 81.116°W	18:58–19:00	1.07 mi (1.72 km)	75 yd (69 m)	Several homes sustained roof, siding, and window damage. A number of trees were downed, and a plastic fence was destroyed.
EF0	ENE of Gulfport	Pinellas	FL	27.7567°N 82.6931°W	19:12–19:13	0.2 mi (0.32 km)	20 yd (18 m)	One tree was toppled and a second was toppled, falling onto a home.
EF1	NE of New Castle	Craig	VA	37.535°N 80.054°W	21:03–21:04	0.5 mi (0.80 km)	150 yd (140 m)	Six homes suffered extensive removal of shingles, exterior vinyl siding, and trimming. Several outbuildings and garages were severely damaged or destroyed. Three cars and a large double-axle trailer were displaced, including a truck that was flipped and landed on another vehicle. Two dogs were displaced or lofted over 100 yd (91 m) when their pens were destroyed; neither were seriously injured. Approximately 50 trees were snapped or uprooted.
EF2	Eastern Greensboro to NNE of Ruffin	Guilford, Rockingham	NC	36.0468°N 79.7597°W	21:07–21:46	32.75 mi (52.71 km)	500 yd (460 m)	This high-end EF2 tornado first touched down on the north side of Interstate 40 in Greensboro, heavily damaging numerous homes and trees. It continued into the Hampton neighborhood, reaching peak intensity near Hampton Elementary School, where a large portion of the roof was ripped off and three nearby portable classroom buildings were blown away and completely destroyed. Major damage occurred in adjacent neighborhoods, with homes pushed off their foundations or sustaining significant roof and exterior wall loss. Power poles were snapped, while many businesses, vehicles, apartment buildings, and churches sustained severe damage as well. The tornado continued into Rockingham County, where at least 20 homes, barns, and outbuildings were significantly damaged near McLeansville, Reidsville, and in Ruffin, where an event center was also damaged, before the tornado dissipated. Countless trees were snapped or uprooted, and at least 9 people were injured along the path. There was also an indirect fatality and $67.2 million in damage.
EF1	W of Pelham, NC to SW of Dry Fork, VA	Caswell (NC), Pittsylvania (VA)	NC, VA	36.509°N 79.510°W	21:51–22:10	16.4 mi (26.4 km)	175 yd (160 m)	In North Carolina, this rain-wrapped tornado damaged several outbuildings. The tornado continued northeast into Virginia, snapping or uprooting many trees in the western part of Danville. Several homes sustained minor roof and structural damage, power lines were downed, and several outbuildings were destroyed. A farm near the end of the path sustained the most intense damage, where a large barn was destroyed at high-end EF1 intensity.
EF1	NW of Moneta	Bedford	VA	37.251°N 79.654°W	22:10–22:11	0.7 mi (1.1 km)	100 yd (91 m)	A home sustained significant damage to its roof, and was pushed slightly off of its cinder block foundation. A nearby barn and outbuilding also sustained extensive damage. Approximately 50 trees were snapped or uprooted.
EF1	Coventry Township	Summit	OH	41.0131°N 81.5541°W	22:16–22:17	0.12 mi (0.19 km)	25 yd (23 m)	This small tornado was embedded in a squall line. Signs and a light pole were damaged at a Burger King, and two cars were flipped and spun around in the parking lot of a Wendy's. Several tree limbs were also snapped off of a tree.
EF1	ESE of Rustburg	Campbell	VA	37.2478°N 79.0121°W	22:56–22:59	1.7 mi (2.7 km)	400 yd (370 m)	Several trees were snapped or uprooted, a roof was blown off a garage, and a manufactured home was pushed off its foundation. A large shed had its metal roof peeled off as well.
EF3	Timberlake to Lynchburg to WNW of Amherst	Campbell, City of Lynchburg, Bedford, Amherst	VA	37.3264°N 79.241°W	23:00–23:25	20.4 mi (32.8 km)	600 yd (550 m)	This strong rain-wrapped tornado touched down in Timberlake, where businesses sustained heavy structural damage, cars and a semi-truck trailer were flipped, and roof damage occurred. In Lynchburg, the tornado destroyed one mobile home and damaged others at a mobile home park, damaged the roofs of several homes and businesses, and snapped or uprooted many trees The tornado briefly entered and exited Bedford County. In Amherst County, the community of Elon sustained EF3 damage, with dozens of frame homes damaged or destroyed in the area. Several of the homes were swept away with only the subflooring left behind, though these homes were very poorly anchored. A motor home was also lofted 30 ft (9.1 m) and overturned. Additional trees were snapped or uprooted before the tornado dissipated. Twelve people were injured. Damage totaled $20 million.
EF0	WNW of Lowesville	Amherst	VA	37.724°N 79.123°W	23:38–23:41	1.5 mi (2.4 km)	75 yd (69 m)	Trees were uprooted.
EF1	Plantation Key to Tavernier	Monroe	FL	24.9879°N 80.5511°W	01:12–01:20	1.11 mi (1.79 km)	60 yd (55 m)	A waterspout began over Florida Bay and moved ashore at Plantation Key, downing large tree limbs, ripping a driveway gate from its mounts, and pushing a boat and car. One home lost its entire gutter and downspout system, and numerous loose items such as trash cans and outside furniture were tossed. The tornado reached peak intensity as it struck a church, where large trees were uprooted and tiles were ripped from the roof. It moved back over the ocean before making a second landfall in Tavernier, where fences were damaged and tree limbs were downed.
EF1	NNW of Wendell	Wake	NC	35.8392°N 79.4082°W	02:35–02:36	0.74 mi (1.19 km)	100 yd (91 m)	A few homes suffered damage to their shingles and siding. Numerous trees were snapped or uprooted, one of which inflicted severe damage to a home upon falling. An outbuilding was also destroyed.

=== April 22 event ===
List of confirmed tornadoes – Sunday, April 22, 2018
EF#	Location	County / Parish	State	Start Coord.	Time (UTC)	Path length	Max width
EF1	Galliano	Lafourche	LA	29.465°N 90.3226°W	14:47–14:48	0.95 mi (1.53 km)	30 yd (27 m)
EF1	A business housed in a double-wide mobile home had its roof ripped off. A Sonic Drive-In lost fascia from its car stalls and two vehicles in the parking lot were turned; a small car was tossed 15 ft (4.6 m) into a field as well. Several large tree limbs were snapped. A carport was ripped from a home, and the house itself had its metal roof covering peeled back. Another residence suffered shingle damage. A few power poles were damaged as well.						
EF0	W of Molino	Escambia	FL	30.7319°N 87.3892°W	18:02–18:03	0.13 mi (0.21 km)	25 yd (23 m)
EF0	One house suffered shingle damage and a broken window, a mobile home was shifted off its foundation, and several small trees were uprooted. Many large tree branches were snapped as well.						
EF0	Fort Rucker	Dale	AL	31.3306°N 85.7093°W	18:11–18:16	1.18 mi (1.90 km)	100 yd (91 m)
EF0	Large tree limbs and small trees were broken or uprooted. Power lines and a wooden dugout structure at a baseball field were damaged.						
EF1	NW of Luverne to SE of Honoravilla	Crenshaw	AL	31.7537°N 86.4005°W	18:43–18:49	6.39 mi (10.28 km)	130 yd (120 m)
EF1	One manufactured home was destroyed while a second suffered moderate damage. A shed was destroyed, a metal roof was ripped from a barn and tossed, and numerous trees were snapped or uprooted; fallen trees damaged a vehicle and a house. In November 2023, this tornado was reanalyzed and had its path length extended from 3.63 mi (5.84 km) to 6.39 mi (10.28 km).						
EF1	SSE of Highland Home	Crenshaw	AL	31.9085°N 86.3063°W	19:11–19:15	2.19 mi (3.52 km)	175 yd (160 m)
EF1	Large trees were snapped and uprooted, and several homes sustained damage to their roofs and siding.						
EF0	NE of Lapine	Montgomery	AL	31.9880°N 86.2595°W	19:25–19:30	2.56 mi (4.12 km)	250 yd (230 m)
EF0	Several trees were snapped or uprooted.						
EF0	W of Gulf Shores	Baldwin	AL	30.2376°N 87.7571°W	20:05–20:06	0.16 mi (0.26 km)	25 yd (23 m)
EF0	A waterspout moved ashore, producing roof and siding damage to two homes; several windows were also blown out.						
EF0	S of Foley	Baldwin	AL	30.3607°N 87.6872°W	20:25–20:28	1.59 mi (2.56 km)	100 yd (91 m)
EF0	Five RVs were overturned at the Anchors Aweigh RV Resort; three occupants were injured. A convenience story canopy and a nearby Lowe's sustained minor damage. Minor tree damage was noted as well.						
EF0	NNE of Elberta	Baldwin	AL	30.4483°N 87.5808°W	20:38–20:41	1.04 mi (1.67 km)	100 yd (91 m)
EF0	A few homes suffered shingle damage and some trees were uprooted.						
EF1	Okaloosa Island to Fort Walton Beach	Okaloosa	FL	30.3963°N 86.623°W	21:13–21:18	1.24 mi (2.00 km)	50 yd (46 m)
EF1	A waterspout moved ashore at Okaloosa Island, inflicting severe damage to a home and removing much of its roof. After entering Fort Walton Beach, it broke the windows at a school and a church, damaged the roofs of several units at an apartment complex, and damaged trees and homes. Two people were injured.						

=== April 23 event ===
List of confirmed tornadoes – Monday, April 23, 2018
EF#	Location	County / Parish	State	Start Coord.	Time (UTC)	Path length	Max width
EF0	SW of Ruskin	Hillsborough	FL	27.7005°N 82.459°W	02:03–02:07	0.96 mi (1.54 km)	40 yd (37 m)
EF0	A mobile home sustained roof damage and had its carport collapsed, fencing was damaged, and light weight debris was thrown several hundred feet. A shed and a large construction dumpster were pushed several feet, and numerous tree limbs were snapped.						

=== April 27 event ===
List of confirmed tornadoes – Friday, April 27, 2018
EF#	Location	County / Parish	State	Start Coord.	Time (UTC)	Path length	Max width
EF0	S of Parkland	Broward	FL	26.298°N 80.267°W	18:37–18:43	1.98 mi (3.19 km)	40 yd (37 m)
EF0	A tornado with a discontinuous path damaged mainly trees and vegetation. A street sign was also damaged.						

== See also ==
- Tornadoes of 2018
- List of United States tornadoes from January to March 2018
- List of United States tornadoes in May 2018
