= Talmage, Missouri =

Unincorporated community in Missouri, U.S.

Coordinates: 37°15′28″N 92°24′47″W

Talmage is an unincorporated community in Wright County, in the U.S. state of Missouri. The community was located just west of Missouri Route E, approximately five miles due east of Hartville and two miles north of the community of Owens. It is on a ridge between Clark and Whetstone creeks at an elevation of 1266 feet.

== History ==
A post office called Talmage was established in 1903, and remained in operation until 1912. The community has the name of the local Talmage family.
