= Beaver Creek (Gasconade River tributary) =

Stream in Missouri, U.S.

Location
- Country: United States
- State: Missouri
- Region: Wright and Texas counties

Physical characteristics
- Source
  - location: Texas County
  - coordinates: 37°07′50″N 92°12′20″W
  - elevation: 1,490 ft (450 m)
- Mouth
  - location: Wright County
  - coordinates: 37°26′31″N 92°23′54″W
  - elevation: 1,014 ft (309 m)

Beaver Creek is a stream in southwestern Texas and eastern Wright counties in the Ozarks of southern Missouri. It is a tributary of the Gasconade River.

The stream headwaters arise on the south edge of the Salem Plateau and just north of the White River Escarpment in southwestern Texas County about three miles east of Mountain Grove. The stream source is at an elevation of 1490 feet just west of Lead Hill. The stream flows to the northwest crossing under US Route 60 and enters Wright County about four miles from the source. The stream continues to the northwest passing under Missouri Route 38 about one mile southwest of the community of Graff. The stream continues to the north-northwest roughly parallel to Missouri Route 95 past the community of Manes. The stream crosses under Route 95 southwest of Mingsville then turns west passing under Missouri Route AF to enter the Gasconade about two miles south of the Wright-Laclede county line.
