= Lead Hill (summit) =

Peak in the Ozarks of Missouri, U.S.

Coordinates: 37°06′04″N 92°38′15″W

Lead Hill is a peak in southwestern Wright County in the Ozarks of southern Missouri. The peak has an elevation of 1,744 feet (532 m).

Lead Hill lies just to the east of the community of Cedar Gap and about 3 miles (4.8 km) west of Mansfield. Lead Hill is an erosional remnant marking the boundary between the Springfield Plateau to the northwest, the Salem Plateau to the northeast and the rugged White River Hills region of the Ozarks to the south. The hill is on the drainage divide between the Gasconade River to the north (Missouri River watershed) and Bryant Creek to the south (White River watershed). The BNSF Railroad line passes just south of the peak.

In the 1870s a lead mine was located on the mountain.
