= Clark Creek (Gasconade River tributary) =

River in Missouri, United States of America

Location
- Country: United States
- State: Missouri
- Region: Wright County

Physical characteristics
- Source
  - coordinates: 37°06′55″N 92°27′22″W
- Mouth
  - coordinates: 37°16′36″N 92°25′32″W
  - elevation: 1,096 ft (334 m)

Clark Creek is a north flowing stream in the Wright County, Missouri. It is a tributary of the Gasconade River. The headwaters form just west of Norwood and pass under U. S. Route 60. The stream passes under Missouri Route 38 about eleven miles north of Norwood and five miles east of Hartville just upstream of its confluence with the Gasconade.

Clark Creek has the name of a pioneer hunter and trapper who lived on the banks of the creek.

== See also ==
- List of rivers of Missouri
