= Whetstone Creek (Gasconade River tributary) =

Stream in Wright County, Missouri, United States

Location
- Country: United States
- State: Missouri
- Region: Wright County

Physical characteristics
- Source
  - coordinates: 37°06′04″N 92°16′21″W
- Mouth
  - coordinates: 37°18′42″N 92°23′30″W
  - elevation: 1,066 ft (325 m)

Whetstone Creek is a north flowing stream in Wright County, Missouri, United States, that is a tributary of the Gasconade River.

== Description ==
The stream's headwaters are just south of Mountain Grove and cross under U. S. Route 60 just west of that city. The stream meanders north crossing under Route N and continuing roughly parallel with Route E past Owens and under Missouri Route 38 east of Rayborn to its confluence with the Gasconade River.

Whetstone Creek was named for the fact whetstones were sourced from its banks.

== See also ==
- List of rivers of Missouri
