= Summit Conference (conference) =

High school athletic conference in southwest Missouri, United States

- Association: MSHSAA
- No. of teams: 8
- Region: Southwest Missouri

The Summit Conference is a high school athletic conference comprising small to mid-size high schools located in southwest Missouri. The conference members are located in Laclede, Ozark, Webster, Wright and Christian county

== Members ==
School	Nickname	Colors	City	County	9–12 Enrollment (2024)	Primary MSHSAA Classification	Type
Conway	Bears		Conway	Laclede	266	Class 3	Public
Fordland	Eagles		Fordland	Webster	186	Class 2	Public
Gainesville	Bulldogs		Gainesville	Ozark	211	Class 2	Public
Hartville	Eagles		Hartville	Wright	210	Class 2	Public
Mansfield	Lions		Mansfield	Wright	227	Class 2	Public
Norwood	Pirates		Norwood	Wright	137	Class 1	Public
Sparta	Trojans		Sparta	Christian	247	Class 2	Public
Seymour	Tigers		Seymour	Webster	240	Class 2	Public
