= Hyde Creek =

Stream in the American state of Missouri

Hyde Creek is a stream in Webster and Wright counties of southern Missouri. The stream headwaters are in western Wright County northwest of Hartville and south of Grovespring. The stream flows northwest to its confluence with Cantrell Creek in Webster County due west of Grovespring and east of Niangua.

The stream source is at 37°19′12″N 92°36′48″W and the confluence is at 37°24′21″N 92°43′58″W.

Hyde Creek has the name of the local Hyde family who settled in the area before the American Civil War.

== See also ==
- List of rivers of Missouri
