= New Grove, Missouri =

Extinct hamlet in Missouri, U.S.

Coordinates: 37°14′41″N 92°39′49″W

New Grove is an extinct town in western Wright County, in the Ozarks of southern Missouri, United States. The GNIS classifies it as a populated place.

The community is located on the north bank of the Woods Fork of the Gasconade River along Missouri Route F, approximately 2.5 miles south of Missouri Route 38.

A post office called New Grove was established in 1905, and remained in operation until 1915. The community once had New Grove Schoolhouse, now defunct.
