= Duncan, Missouri =

Unincorporated community in Missouri, U.S.

Coordinates: 37°16′54″N 92°41′31″W

Duncan is an unincorporated community in Webster and Wright counties, in the U.S. state of Missouri.

Duncan is located along Missouri Route 38 on the Webster - Wright county line and about midway between Marshfield to the west and Hartville to the east. It is at the headquarters of Cantrell Creek which flows to the northwest.

== History ==
A post office called Duncan was established on the Webster County side in 1871, where it remained in operation until 1923. The community has the name of the local Duncan family.
