= Hillhouse Hollow =

Stream valley in Missouri, U.S.

Hillhouse Hollow is a stream valley in northeastern Wright County in the Ozarks of southern Missouri.

The source area for the intermittent stream in the valley is at 37°21′49″N 92°28′25″W and the confluence with the Gasconade River is at 37°25′21″N 92°24′10″W. The stream source area is just east of Missouri Route Z and it flows northeast past the community of St. George and passing under Missouri Route H to its confluence with the Gasconade adjacent to Missouri Route T.

Hillhouse Hollow (or Hill House Hollow) was so named due to the "hill houses" located above it in pioneer days.
