= Umpire, Missouri =

Unincorporated community in Missouri, U.S.

Coordinates: 37°10′47″N 92°36′22″W

Umpire is an unincorporated community in southwestern Wright County, in the U.S. state of Missouri.

The community is located on the north side of the Gasconade River, approximately five miles north of Mansfield.

== History ==
A post office called Umpire was established in 1884, and remained in operation until 1910. It is unknown why the name "Umpire" was applied to this community.
