= Odin, Missouri =

Unincorporated community in Missouri, U.S.

Coordinates: 37.268°N 92.618°W

Odin is an unincorporated community in Wright County, in the U.S. state of Missouri. The community is located on Missouri Route 38, approximately five miles west of Hartville. It is located at the confluence of Bowman Creek and the Woods Fork of the Gasconade River.

== History ==
A post office called Odin was established In 1882, and remained in operation until 1915. The community's name most likely is a transfer from Odin, Illinois.
