= Astoria, Missouri =

Unincorporated community in Missouri, U.S.

Coordinates: 37°22′47″N 92°17′20″W

Astoria is an unincorporated community in northeastern Wright County, in the Ozarks of southern Missouri. The community is located at an elevation of 1227 feet above Beaver Creek adjacent to the Mark Twain National Forest. Manes is approximately four miles west, on Missouri Route 95.

== History ==
A post office called Astoria was established in 1844, and remained in operation until 1937. The community's name most likely is a transfer from Astoria, New York.

In 1925, Astoria had 15 inhabitants.
