= St. George, Wright County, Missouri =

Unincorporated community in Missouri, U.S.

Coordinates: 37°22′51″N 92°26′32″W

St. George is an unincorporated community in central Wright County, in the U.S. state of Missouri. The community is located on St. George Road, just southwest of Missouri Route H and four miles west of Manes. The site is in Hillhouse Hollow, a tributary of the Gasconade River.

== History ==
A post office called Saint George was in operation from 1872 until 1958. The community has the name of the local St. George family.
