= Edwards Branch =

Stream in Wright County, Missouri, U.S.

Coordinates: 37°16′50″N 92°38′04″W

Edwards Branch is a stream in western Wright County in the U.S. state of Missouri. It flows into Bowman Creek approximately one mile northwest of the community of Odin.
