= Smittle, Missouri =

Unincorporated community in Missouri, U.S.

Coordinates: 37°25′09″N 92°30′36″W

Smittle is an unincorporated community in northwestern Wright County, in the U.S. state of Missouri. The community was located on Missouri Route TT, approximately five miles east of Grovespring and one half mile west of Elk Creek. The historic Mt. Olive School was just north of the village.

== History ==
A post office called Smittle was established in 1908, and remained in operation until 1915. The community has the name of the local Smittle family.
