= Hubble Township, Webster County, Missouri =

Township in the American state of Missouri

Coordinates: 37°17′59″N 92°53′19″W

Hubble Township is a township in Webster County, in the U.S. state of Missouri. In 2022, it was created from the portion of East Ozark Township south of Route 38, with the remainder becoming Osage Township. Hubble Township takes its name from the Hubble Fruit Farm.
