= Summit Conference =

Summit Conference may refer to:

- Summit Conference (conference), a high school athletic conference in Missouri
- Summit Conference (album), a 1994 album by Reggie Workman
- Summit conference, or summit meeting, an international meeting of heads of state or government
