= Mingsville, Missouri =

Extinct hamlet in Missouri, U.S.

Coordinates: 37°27′06″N 92°20′23″W

Mingsville is an extinct town in northeastern Wright County, in the U.S. state of Missouri. The GNIS classifies it as a populated place.

The community lies just west of Missouri Route 95 along Shelby Branch, which is a tributary to Beaver Creek. The community is located just within the boundary of the Mark Twain National Forest. Lynchburg, in Laclede County, is approximately 4.5 miles to the northeast along Route 95.

A post office called Mingsville was established in 1871, and remained in operation until 1918. The community has the name of the local Mings family.
