= Jerktail, Missouri =

Jerktail
- Unincorporated community
- Location within the state of Missouri
- Coordinates: 37°25′27″N 92°26′13″W
- Country: United States
- State: Missouri
- County: Wright
- Elevation: 1,306 ft (398 m)
- Time zone: UTC-6 (Central (CST))
  - Summer (DST): UTC-5 (EDT)
- GNIS feature ID: 750505

Jerktail is an unincorporated community located in northern Wright County, Missouri, United States. The community is approximately two miles west of the Gasconade River and about three miles south of Competition in adjacent Laclede County.

Variant names were "Jerk Tail" and "Mint". A post office called Mint was established in 1889, and remained in operation until 1910. The former name "Mint" was due to the abundance of wild mint bushes near the original town site.
