= Kelton House (Hartville, Missouri) =

Historic house in Missouri, United States

- Kelton House ..
- U.S. National Register of Historic Places
- Location within Missouri Location within the United States
- Location: MO 38 and Church St., Hartville, Missouri
- Coordinates: 37°16′9″N 92°30′46″W
- Area: less than one acre
- Built: c. 1895
- Architectural style: Late Victorian
- NRHP reference No.: 86002803
- Added to NRHP: October 2, 1983

Kelton House, also known as the Curtis Kelton House and Pyatt House, is a historic home located at Hartville, Wright County, Missouri, United States. It was built about 1895, and incorporates an earlier timber frame central passage plan I-house dated to the mid-1870s. It is a two-story, Late Victorian-style frame dwelling. Also on the property is a contributing smokehouse.

It was listed on the National Register of Historic Places in 1983.

This home also sits on the battlefield of The Battle of Hartville, 1863. The 99th Illinois was stationed at the location where the house is built during the battle.
