= Fuson =

Fuson is a surname. Notable people with the surname include:

- Grady Fuson (born 1956), American baseball executive
- Lisa Fuson (born 1963), American voice actress
- Reynold C. Fuson (1895–1979), American chemist
- Stacy Marie Fuson (born 1978), American model

== See also ==
- Fuson, Missouri, a community in the United States
