= Osage Township, Webster County, Missouri =

Township in the American state of Missouri

Coordinates: 37°20′19″N 92°50′16″W

Osage Township is a township in Webster County, in the U.S. state of Missouri. In 2022, it was created from the portion of East Ozark Township north of Route 38, with the remainder becoming Hubble Township. Osage Township takes its name from the Osage River, the headwaters of which run through the township.
