= East Ozark Township, Webster County, Missouri =

Township in the American state of Missouri

Coordinates: 37.2922°N 92.8508°W

East Ozark Township was a township in Webster County, in the U.S. state of Missouri. In 2022, it was divided into Hubble and Osage townships along Route 38.

East Ozark Township took its name from the Ozark Mountains.
