= Rayborn, Missouri =

Unincorporated community in Missouri, U.S.

Coordinates: 37°18′16″N 92°21′28″W

Rayborn is an unincorporated community in eastern Wright County, in the U.S. state of Missouri. Rayborn is located on Missouri Route 38, between Hartville and Graff. The intersection of Route 38 and Missouri Route 95 is approximately 2.5 miles to the east of the town.

== History ==
A post office called Rayborn was established in 1904, and remained in operation until 1956. The community has the name of the local Rayborn family.
