= Boyer, Missouri =

Unincorporated community in Missouri, U.S.

Coordinates: 37°18′58″N 92°33′06″W

Boyer is an unincorporated community in Wright County, in the U.S. state of Missouri. The community is located on Missouri Route 5, northwest of Hartville.

== History ==
A post office called Boyer was established in 1884, and remained in operation until 1909. The community has the name of the local Boyer family.
