= Fuson, Missouri =

Unincorporated community in Missouri, U.S.

Coordinates: 37°19′56″N 92°29′55″W

Fuson is an unincorporated community in Wright County, in the U.S. state of Missouri. The community is located on Missouri Route Z, approximately five miles north of Hartville.

== History ==
A post office called Fuson was established in 1888, and remained in operation until 1923. The community has the name of T. B. Fuson, a country doctor.
