= Duggan, Missouri =

Unincorporated community in Missouri, U.S.

Coordinates: 37°11′39″N 92°24′50″W

Duggan is an unincorporated community in Wright County, in the U.S. state of Missouri.

== History ==
A post office called Duggan was established in 1891, and remained in operation until 1906. The community has the name of the local Duggan family.
