= Graff, Missouri =

Unincorporated community in Missouri, U.S.

Coordinates: 37°19′03″N 92°16′58″W

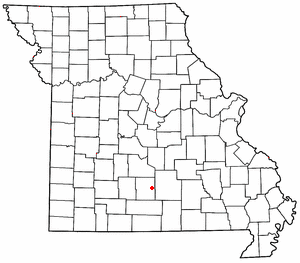

Graff is an unincorporated community in eastern Wright County, Missouri, United States. It is located on Missouri Route 38, 12.5 miles (20.1 km) east-northeast of Hartville.

A post office called Graff has been in operation since 1899. The community most likely was formerly called "Groff". The Groff family were among the first settlers.
