= Cedar Gap, Missouri =

Unincorporated community in Wright County, Missouri, United States

Coordinates: 37°06′20″N 92°40′11″W

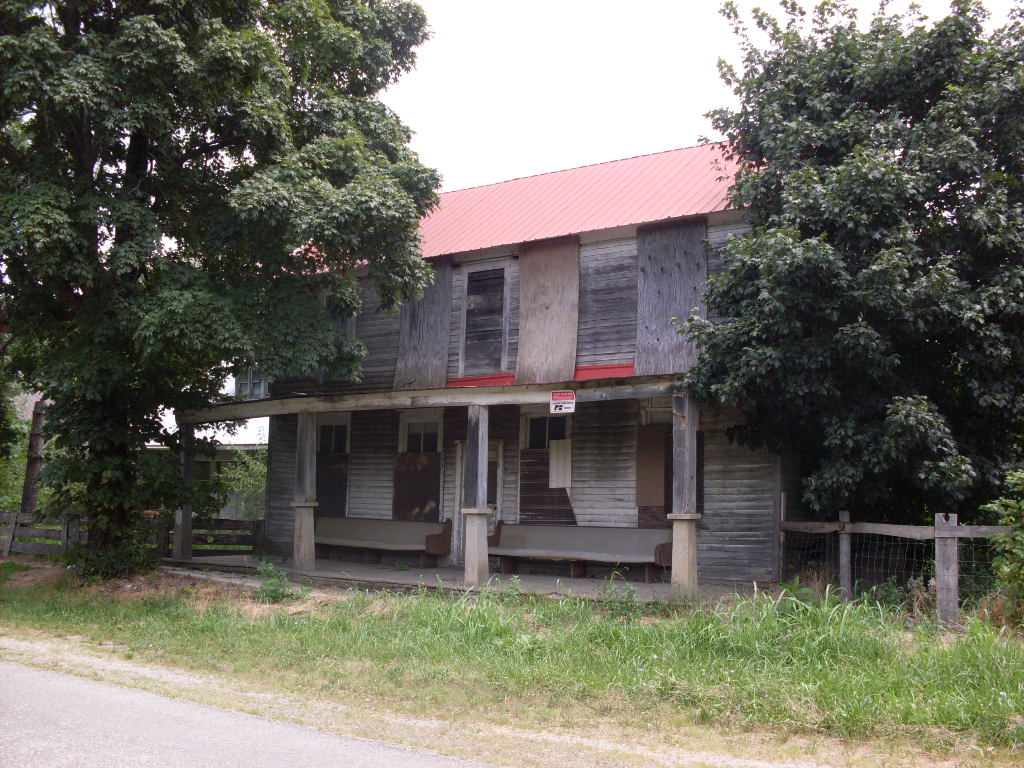
Old building in Cedar Gap, Missouri

Cedar Gap is an unincorporated community in southwestern Wright County, Missouri, United States. Cedar Gap lies just south of US Route 60 between Mansfield to the east and Seymour in adjacent Webster County to the west.

== History and geography ==
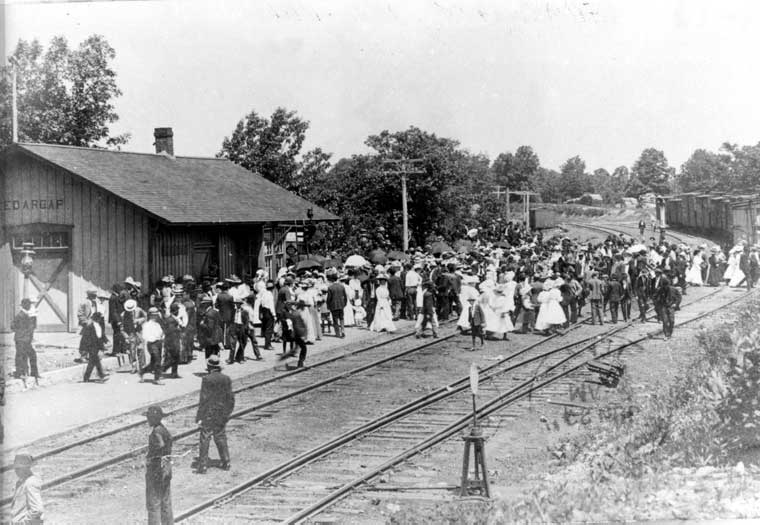
Railroad depot on the St. Louis-San Francisco Railway at Cedar Gap, Missouri, in 1905

Cedar Gap, at an elevation of 1,694 feet (516 m), was established in 1882 as a station on the Springfield – Memphis line of the St. Louis-San Francisco Railway. It was named for the cedar trees and the topographic "gaps" which had to be bridged by the railroad in the more rugged terrain of the Lead Hill area 1.8 miles (2.9 km) to the east, the second highest point in Missouri at 1,744 feet (532 m). The early railroad also constructed a dam to form the 40 acre Cedar Gap Lake one mile to the northwest on the Wright–Webster county line as a water supply for the steam engined trains.

Cedar Gap lies on the drainage divide between the Gasconade River to the north, Bryant Creek which is a tributary to the North Fork River to the southeast and the Finley Creek tributary to the James River to the west.

The Cedar Gap Conservation Area includes 431 acres (1.74 km^{2}) of rugged topography including the headwaters of Bryant Creek lying south of Cedar Gap. The conservation area was formed in 1999 and is managed by the Missouri Department of Conservation.

== Demographics ==
Historical population
Census	Pop.	Note	%±
1910	112		—
1920	148		32.1%
1930	84		−43.2%
1940	135		60.7%
1950	45		−66.7%
Missouri Census Data Center
