= Van Buren Township, Wright County, Missouri =

Township in Wright County, Missouri, U.S.

Coordinates: 37.30°N 92.36°W

Van Buren Township is an inactive township in Wright County, in the U.S. state of Missouri.

Van Buren Township was erected in 1855, taking its name from Martin Van Buren, 8th President of the United States.
