= Owens, Missouri =

Unincorporated community in Missouri, U.S.

Coordinates: 37°13′08″N 92°24′11″W

Owens is an unincorporated community in Wright County, in the U.S. state of Missouri. Owens is located on Missouri Route E, approximately seven miles north of Norwood.

The community once had Owens Schoolhouse, which bore the name of the Owen family of settlers.
