= Dawson, Missouri =

Unincorporated community in Missouri, U.S.

Coordinates: 37°15′25″N 92°18′29″W

Dawson is an unincorporated community in eastern Wright County, Missouri, United States. Dawson is located on Missouri Route 95, approximately nine miles north of Mountain Grove and three miles south of the Route 95 - Missouri Route 38 junction.

Dawson had a post office which was reported as active from 1910 through 1956. The community had a school (Dawson School) in 1938.
