= Macomb, Missouri =

Macomb
- Unincorporated community
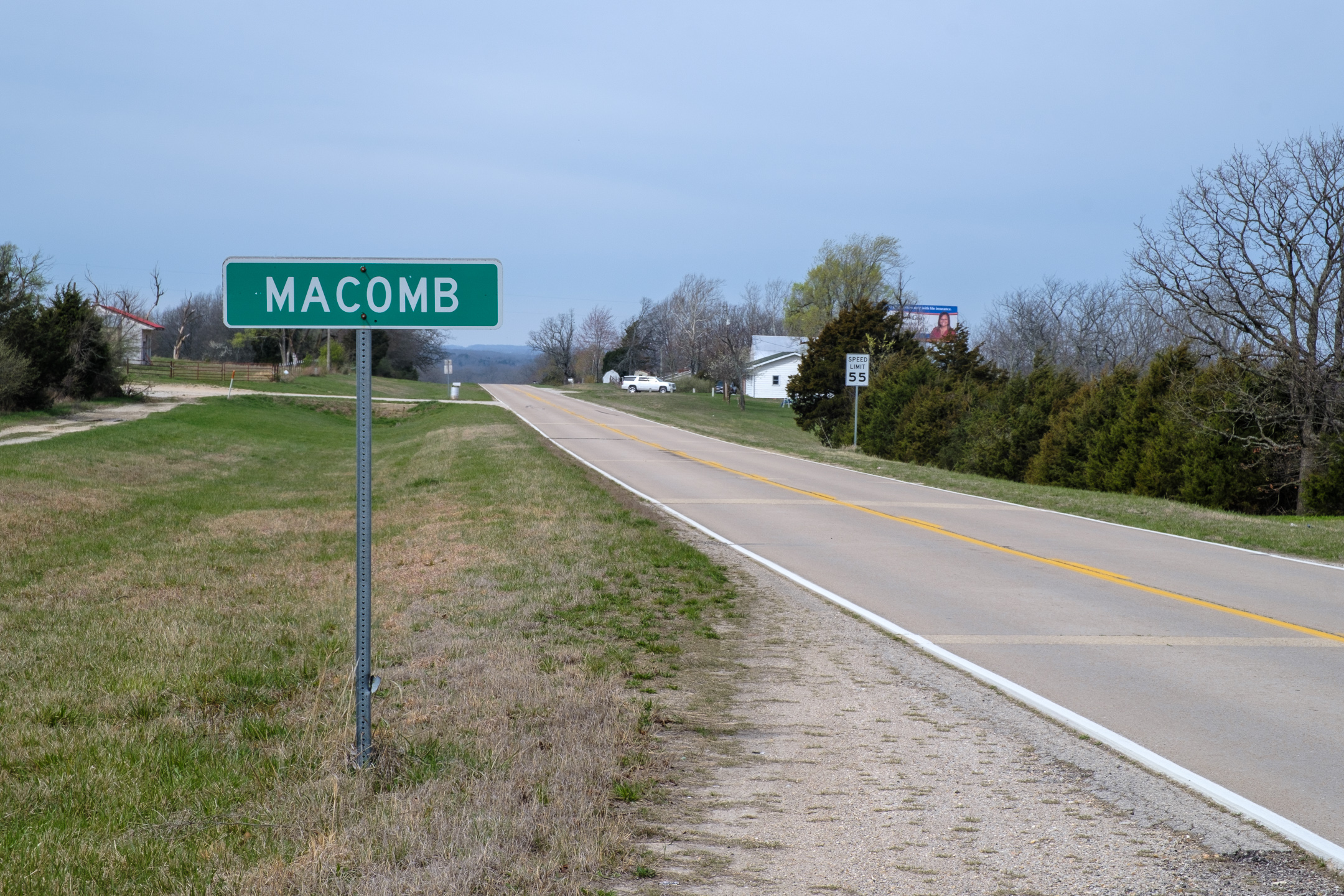

- Location within the state of Missouri
- Country: United States
- State: Missouri
- County: Wright
- Elevation: 1,519 ft (463 m)
- Time zone: UTC-6 (Central (CST))
  - Summer (DST): UTC-5 (EDT)
- GNIS feature ID: 721734

Macomb is an unincorporated community in Wright County, Missouri, United States. It is located on Missouri Route K, approximately 1.5 mi (2.4 km) south of U.S. Route 60 and on the Burlington Northern Railroad line.

A post office called Macomb has been in operation since 1886. The community has the name of the local Macomb family.
