= Grovespring, Missouri =

- Census-Designated Place
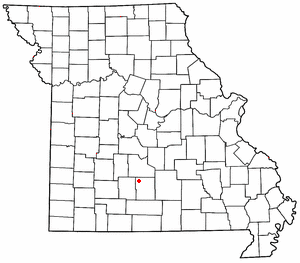
- Location of Grovespring in Missouri
- Coordinates: 37°23′59″N 92°36′35″W
- Country: United States
- State: Missouri
- County: Wright

Area
  - Total: 1.19 sq mi (3.09 km^{2})
  - Land: 1.19 sq mi (3.09 km^{2})
  - Water: 0 sq mi (0.00 km^{2})

Population (2020)
  - Total: 187
  - Density: 156.6/sq mi (60.46/km^{2})
- FIPS code: 29-29656
- GNIS feature ID: 718906

Grovespring is an unincorporated community in Wright County, Missouri, United States. It is located on Missouri Route 5, approximately 20 miles (32 km) south of Lebanon, Missouri in neighbouring Laclede County.

== History ==
A post office called Grovespring was established in 1872, and the name was changed to Grovespring in 1895.

== Demographics ==
Historical population
| Census | Pop. | Note | %± |
|---|---|---|---|
| 2020 | 187 | | — |
U.S. Decennial Census

Grovespring first appeared as a census designated place in the 2020 U.S. census.
