= Norwood, Missouri =

City in Wright County, Missouri, United States

- City
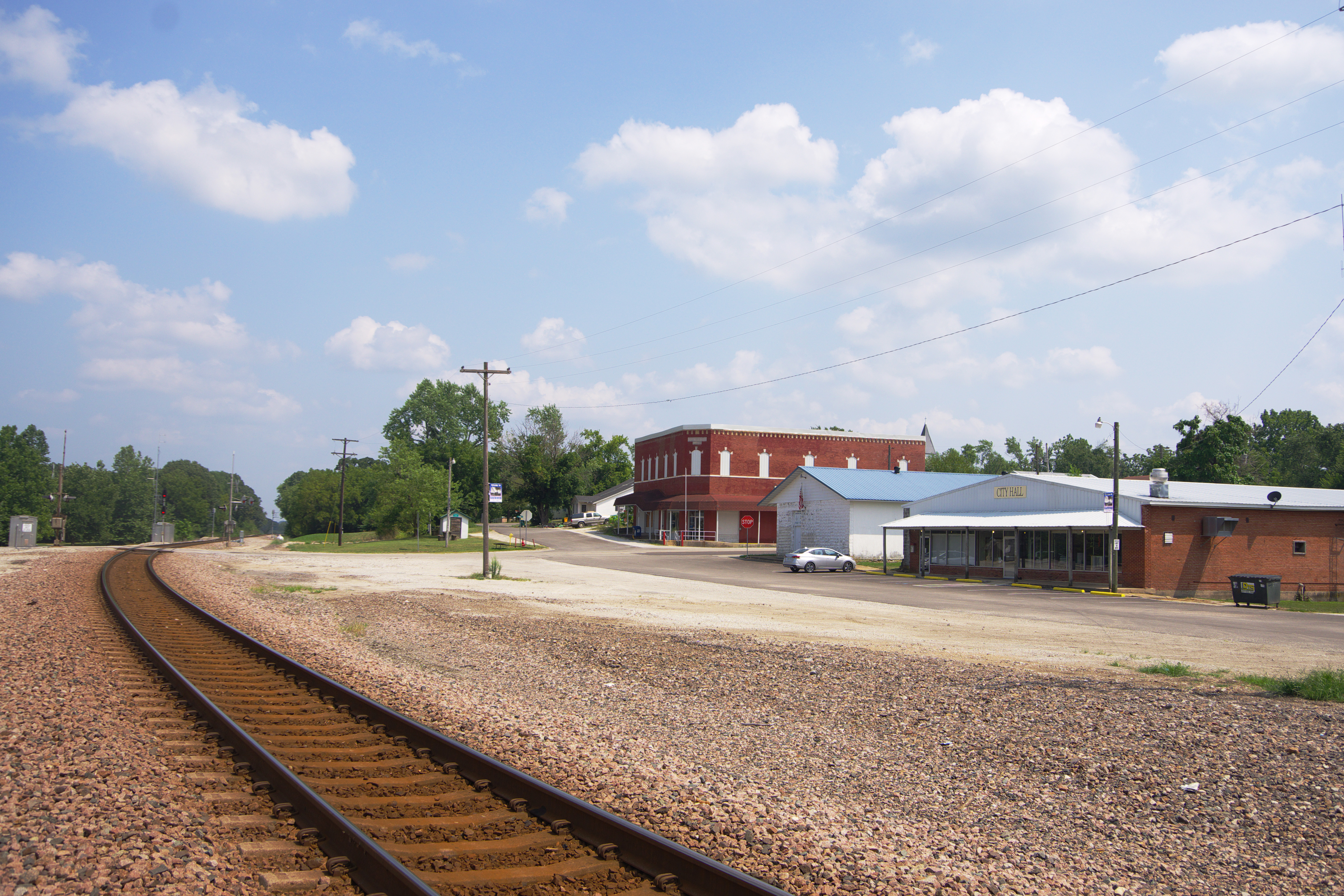
- Norwood

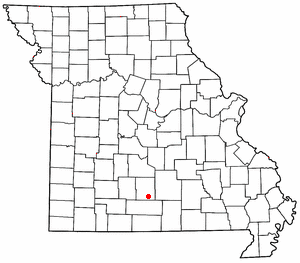
- Location of Norwood, Missouri
- Coordinates: 37°06′30″N 92°24′54″W
- Country: United States
- State: Missouri
- County: Wright

Area
  - Total: 1.60 sq mi (4.15 km^{2})
  - Land: 1.60 sq mi (4.15 km^{2})
  - Water: 0 sq mi (0.00 km^{2})
- Elevation: 1,490 ft (454 m)

Population (2020)
  - Total: 578
  - Density: 361.0/sq mi (139.37/km^{2})
- Time zone: UTC-6 (Central (CST))
  - Summer (DST): UTC-5 (CDT)
- ZIP code: 65717
- Area code: 417
- FIPS code: 29-53454
- GNIS feature ID: 0723525

Norwood is a city in Wright County, Missouri, United States. As of the 2020 census, Norwood had a population of 578.

== History ==
Norwood was laid out in 1882. The community was named by lawyer W.S. Thompson, who was inspired by the novel Norwood: or, Village Life in New England, by Henry Ward Beecher. A post office called Norwood has been in operation since 1882.

== Geography ==
Norwood is located in the Ozarks, along the south edge of the Salem Plateau. The community is served by US Route 60 and Routes C, PP and E. Mountain Grove is to the east and Mansfield is to the west along Route 60. The town sits on the drainage divide between the White River tributaries to the south and the Missouri River tributaries to the north.

According to the United States Census Bureau, the city has a total area of 1.60 square miles (4.14 km^{2}), all land.

== Demographics ==
Historical population
Census	Pop.	Note	%±
1930	349		—
1940	398		14.0%
1950	345		−13.3%
1960	263		−23.8%
1970	294		11.8%
1980	391		33.0%
1990	449		14.8%
2000	552		22.9%
2010	665		20.5%
2020	578		−13.1%
U.S. Decennial Census

=== 2010 census ===
As of the census of 2010, there were 665 people, 241 households, and 167 families living in the city. The population density was 415.6 inhabitants per square mile (160.5/km^{2}). There were 277 housing units at an average density of 173.1 per square mile (66.8/km^{2}). The racial makeup of the city was 96.1% White, 0.9% African American, 0.9% Native American, 0.2% from other races, and 2.0% from two or more races. Hispanic or Latino of any race were 1.4% of the population.

There were 241 households, of which 43.6% had children under the age of 18 living with them, 48.5% were married couples living together, 14.9% had a female householder with no husband present, 5.8% had a male householder with no wife present, and 30.7% were non-families. 25.7% of all households were made up of individuals, and 10.4% had someone living alone who was 65 years of age or older. The average household size was 2.76 and the average family size was 3.26.

The median age in the city was 31.9 years. 31.9% of residents were under the age of 18; 9.2% were between the ages of 18 and 24; 24.8% were from 25 to 44; 24.6% were from 45 to 64; and 9.8% were 65 years of age or older. The gender makeup of the city was 51.7% male and 48.3% female.

=== 2000 census ===
As of the census of 2000, there were 552 people, 209 households, and 145 families living in the city. The population density was 347.4 inhabitants per square mile (134.1/km^{2}). There were 245 housing units at an average density of 154.2 per square mile (59.5/km^{2}). The racial makeup of the city was 98.01% White, 0.91% Native American, and 1.09% from two or more races. Hispanic or Latino of any race were 0.54% of the population.

There were 209 households, out of which 38.3% had children under the age of 18 living with them, 53.6% were married couples living together, 11.0% had a female householder with no husband present, and 30.6% were non-families. 27.3% of all households were made up of individuals, and 12.4% had someone living alone who was 65 years of age or older. The average household size was 2.64 and the average family size was 3.21.

In the city the population was spread out, with 30.6% under the age of 18, 11.8% from 18 to 24, 25.7% from 25 to 44, 18.3% from 45 to 64, and 13.6% who were 65 years of age or older. The median age was 32 years. For every 100 females there were 92.3 males. For every 100 females age 18 and over, there were 85.9 males.

The median income for a household in the city was $22,614, and the median income for a family was $27,500. Males had a median income of $26,250 versus $24,500 for females. The per capita income for the city was $9,670. About 21.3% of families and 29.5% of the population were below the poverty line, including 39.6% of those under age 18 and 23.6% of those age 65 or over.

== Education ==
Public education in Norwood is administered by Norwood R-I School District.

== See also ==
- List of cities in Missouri
