= Manes, Missouri =

Unincorporated community in Missouri, U.S.

Coordinates: 37°22′48″N 92°22′01″W

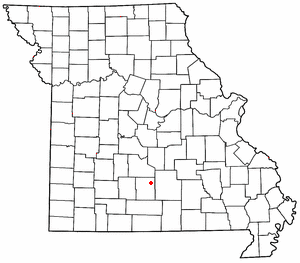

Manes (/ˈmeɪnəs/ MAY-nəs) is an unincorporated community in Wright County, Missouri, United States. It is located on Route 95, approximately 12 miles northeast of Hartville.

A post office called Manes was established in 1890, and remained in operation until 1977. The origin of the name "Manes" is uncertain.

Manes, circa 1972
