= Mansfield, Missouri =

City in Wright County, Missouri, United States

- City
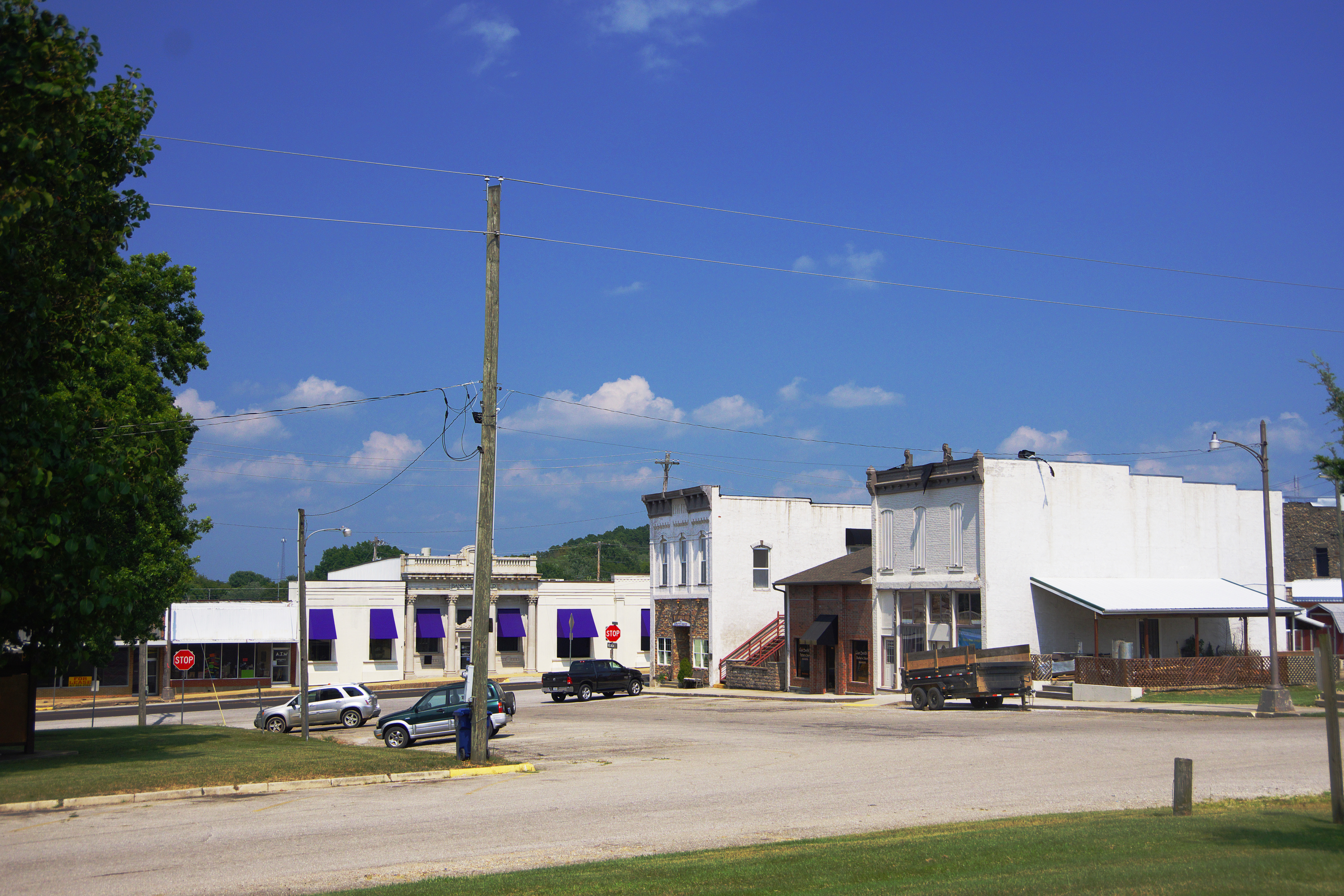
- East Parksquare

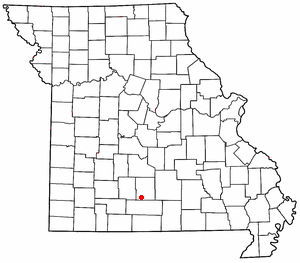
- Location of Mansfield, Missouri
- Coordinates: 37°06′24″N 92°34′51″W
- Country: United States
- State: Missouri
- County: Wright

Area
  - Total: 1.90 sq mi (4.91 km^{2})
  - Land: 1.88 sq mi (4.87 km^{2})
  - Water: 0.015 sq mi (0.04 km^{2})
- Elevation: 1,483 ft (452 m)

Population (2020)
  - Total: 1,193
  - Density: 634.4/sq mi (244.96/km^{2})
- Time zone: UTC-6 (Central (CST))
  - Summer (DST): UTC-5 (CDT)
- ZIP code: 65704
- Area code: 417
- FIPS code: 29-45740
- GNIS feature ID: 0721807
- Website: www.mansfieldcityhall.org

Mansfield is a city in Wright County, Missouri, United States. As of the 2020 census, Mansfield had a population of 1,193.

== History ==
Mansfield was platted in 1882 by F. M. Mansfield, and named for him. A post office called Mansfield has been in operation since 1882.

== Demographics ==
Historical population
Census	Pop.	Note	%±
1900	494		—
1910	477		−3.4%
1920	757		58.7%
1930	861		13.7%
1940	922		7.1%
1950	963		4.4%
1960	949		−1.5%
1970	1,056		11.3%
1980	1,423		34.8%
1990	1,429		0.4%
2000	1,349		−5.6%
2010	1,296		−3.9%
2020	1,193		−7.9%
U.S. Decennial Census

=== 2010 census ===
As of the census of 2010, there were 1,296 people, 568 households, and 322 families living in the city. The population density was 689.4 inhabitants per square mile (266.2/km^{2}). There were 646 housing units at an average density of 343.6 per square mile (132.7/km^{2}). The racial makeup of the city was 97.6% White, 0.6% African American, 0.4% Native American, 0.5% Asian, and 0.8% from two or more races. Hispanic or Latino of any race were 0.9% of the population.

There were 568 households, of which 30.5% had children under the age of 18 living with them, 37.9% were married couples living together, 13.7% had a female householder with no husband present, 5.1% had a male householder with no wife present, and 43.3% were non-families. 38.9% of all households were made up of individuals, and 19.7% had someone living alone who was 65 years of age or older. The average household size was 2.28 and the average family size was 3.07.

The median age in the city was 38.1 years. 27.2% of residents were under the age of 18; 9% were between the ages of 18 and 24; 22.3% were from 25 to 44; 24.4% were from 45 to 64; and 17% were 65 years of age or older. The gender makeup of the city was 47.4% male and 52.6% female.

=== 2000 census ===
As of the census of 2000, there were 1,349 people, 564 households, and 354 families living in the city. The population density was 859.0 inhabitants per square mile (331.7/km^{2}). There were 632 housing units at an average density of 402.4 per square mile (155.4/km^{2}). The racial makeup of the city was 97.3% White, 0.2% African American, 0.8% Native American, 0.3% Asian, and 1.4% from two or more races. Hispanic or Latino of any race were 0.6% of the population.

There were 564 households, out of which 34.9% had children under the age of 18 living with them, 47.0% were married couples living together in Mansfield, Mo 12.1% had a female householder with no husband present 37.1% were classified as "non-families" (a U.S. census term for one individual living alone, or a group of individuals who are not all related by blood, marriage, or adoption). 34.9% of all households were made up of individuals, and 21.1% had someone living alone who was 65 years of age or older. The average household size was 2.39 and the average family size was 3.07.

In the city the population was spread out, with 29.7% under the age of 18, 9.4% from 18 to 24, 25.7% from 25 to 44, 17.9% from 45 to 64, and 17.3% who were 65 years of age or older. The median age was 34 years. For every 100 females there were 83.0 males. For every 100 females age 18 and over, there were 76.4 males.

The median income for a household in the city was $21,875, and the median income for a family was $27,734. Males had a median income of $27,143 versus $15,216 for females. The per capita income for the city was $11,303. About 20.9% of families and 24.2% of the population were below the poverty line, including 29.8% of those under age 18 and 33.6% of those age 65 or over.

== Geography ==
Mansfield is located in the Ozarks on the south edge of the Salem Plateau. The community is served by US Route 60 and Missouri Route 5. The town sits on the drainage divide between the White River tributaries to the south and the Missouri River tributaries to the north.

According to the United States Census Bureau, the city has a total area of 1.90 square miles (4.92 km^{2}), of which 1.88 square miles (4.87 km^{2}) is land and 0.02 square miles (0.05 km^{2}) is water.

=== Climate ===
Climate data for Mansfield, Missouri (1991–2020 normals, extremes 1962–present)
Month	Jan	Feb	Mar	Apr	May	Jun	Jul	Aug	Sep	Oct	Nov	Dec	Year
Record high °F (°C)	76 (24)	82 (28)	85 (29)	92 (33)	92 (33)	104 (40)	106 (41)	104 (40)	103 (39)	93 (34)	82 (28)	75 (24)	106 (41)
Mean maximum °F (°C)	65.8 (18.8)	70.4 (21.3)	77.1 (25.1)	82.5 (28.1)	86.3 (30.2)	90.7 (32.6)	95.8 (35.4)	96.0 (35.6)	91.0 (32.8)	83.3 (28.5)	74.2 (23.4)	65.2 (18.4)	97.8 (36.6)
Mean daily maximum °F (°C)	41.6 (5.3)	46.5 (8.1)	56.3 (13.5)	66.0 (18.9)	74.5 (23.6)	82.6 (28.1)	87.7 (30.9)	87.4 (30.8)	79.8 (26.6)	68.6 (20.3)	55.5 (13.1)	44.9 (7.2)	66.0 (18.9)
Daily mean °F (°C)	31.5 (−0.3)	35.9 (2.2)	45.1 (7.3)	54.9 (12.7)	64.4 (18.0)	72.9 (22.7)	77.5 (25.3)	76.5 (24.7)	68.4 (20.2)	57.1 (13.9)	45.0 (7.2)	35.6 (2.0)	55.4 (13.0)
Mean daily minimum °F (°C)	21.4 (−5.9)	25.3 (−3.7)	34.0 (1.1)	43.7 (6.5)	54.3 (12.4)	63.2 (17.3)	67.2 (19.6)	65.6 (18.7)	57.0 (13.9)	45.6 (7.6)	34.5 (1.4)	26.2 (−3.2)	44.8 (7.1)
Mean minimum °F (°C)	4.0 (−15.6)	8.8 (−12.9)	16.0 (−8.9)	29.0 (−1.7)	39.0 (3.9)	51.1 (10.6)	56.6 (13.7)	54.3 (12.4)	42.7 (5.9)	30.0 (−1.1)	19.9 (−6.7)	9.7 (−12.4)	−0.3 (−17.9)
Record low °F (°C)	−25 (−32)	−16 (−27)	−1 (−18)	10 (−12)	23 (−5)	32 (0)	43 (6)	35 (2)	20 (−7)	16 (−9)	−5 (−21)	−20 (−29)	−25 (−32)
Average precipitation inches (mm)	2.73 (69)	2.76 (70)	4.25 (108)	5.39 (137)	5.52 (140)	4.16 (106)	4.40 (112)	3.35 (85)	4.07 (103)	3.62 (92)	3.97 (101)	2.87 (73)	47.09 (1,196)
Average snowfall inches (cm)	2.2 (5.6)	2.1 (5.3)	1.9 (4.8)	0.0 (0.0)	0.0 (0.0)	0.0 (0.0)	0.0 (0.0)	0.0 (0.0)	0.0 (0.0)	0.0 (0.0)	0.0 (0.0)	1.5 (3.8)	7.7 (20)
Average precipitation days (≥ 0.01 in)	6.7	7.2	9.5	9.7	11.7	9.4	8.9	7.4	7.0	8.6	8.3	7.4	101.8
Average snowy days (≥ 0.1 in)	1.6	1.4	0.6	0.0	0.0	0.0	0.0	0.0	0.0	0.0	0.0	0.8	4.4
Source: NOAA

== Education ==
Public education in Mansfield is administered by Mansfield R-IV School District.

In 1973 voters accepted a bond to have a new elementary school built.

Mansfield has a public library, the Laura Ingalls Wilder Public Library.

== Notable people ==
In 1894, Laura Ingalls Wilder, along with her husband, Almanzo, and their daughter Rose moved from South Dakota to Mansfield. They remained in the area for the next 60 years and established Rocky Ridge Farm, a large, successful poultry, dairy, and fruit farm on the outskirts of town. Today, their unique 10-room farmhouse is a National Historic Landmark, and the home of the Laura Ingalls Wilder Home and Museum, which attracts thousands of visitors to Mansfield each year. The Wilders also lived for a time in the Rock House built for them by their daughter Rose.

As a young man, future actor Ken Osmond, of Leave It to Beaver, was a neighbor of the Wilders.

Buildings of the museum

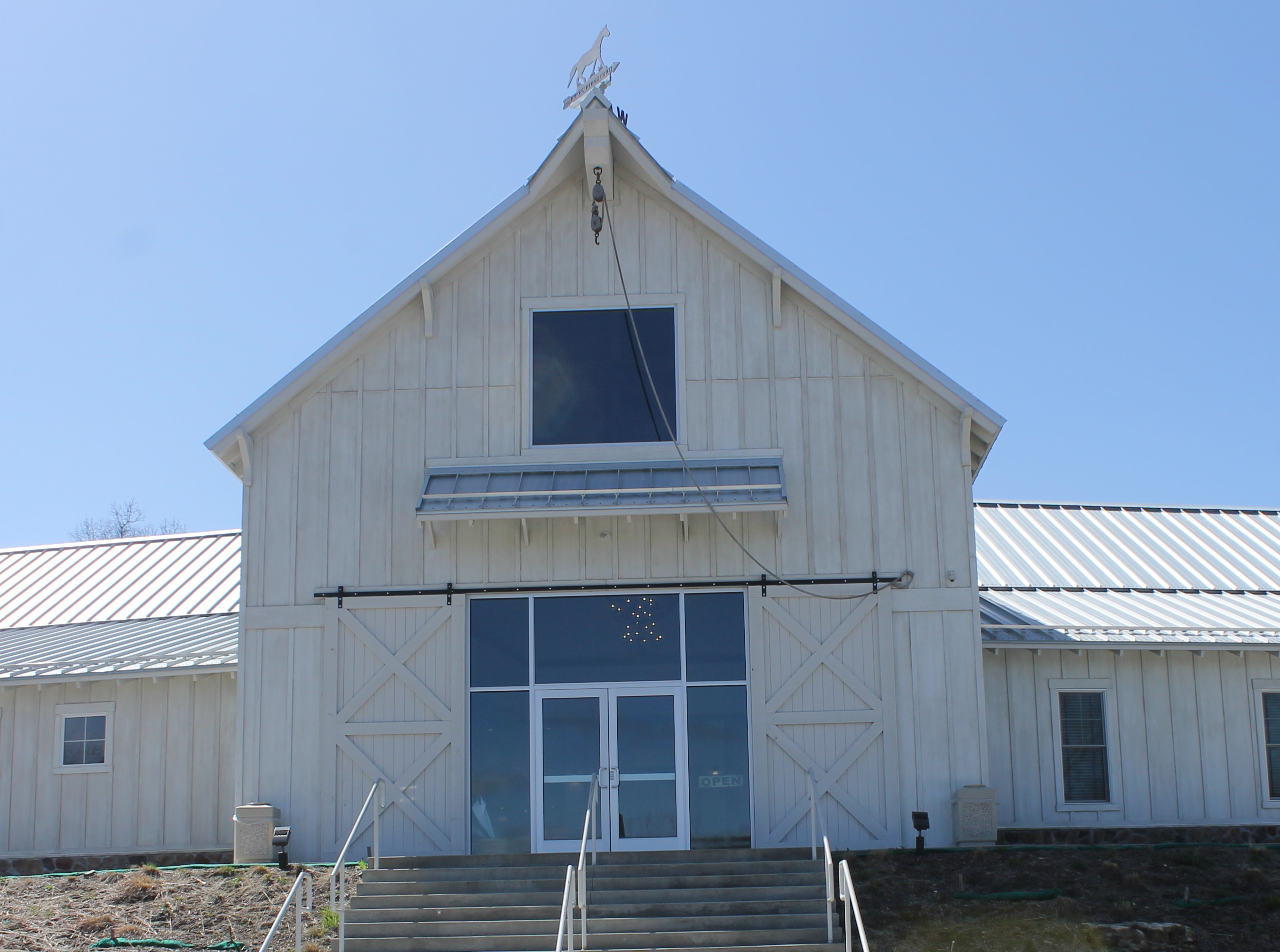
Laura Ingalls Wilder Museum in Mansfield

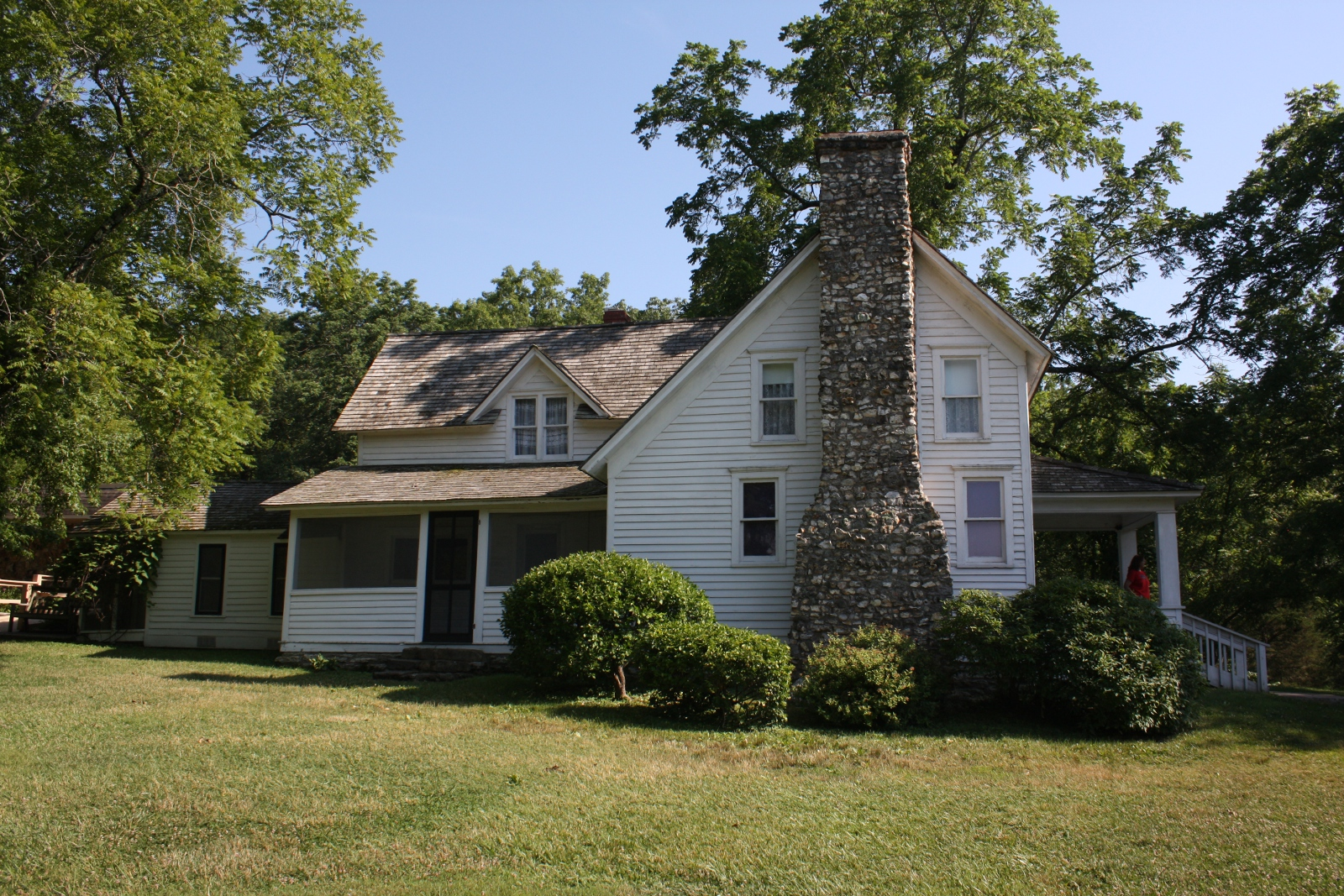
Rocky Ridge Farm

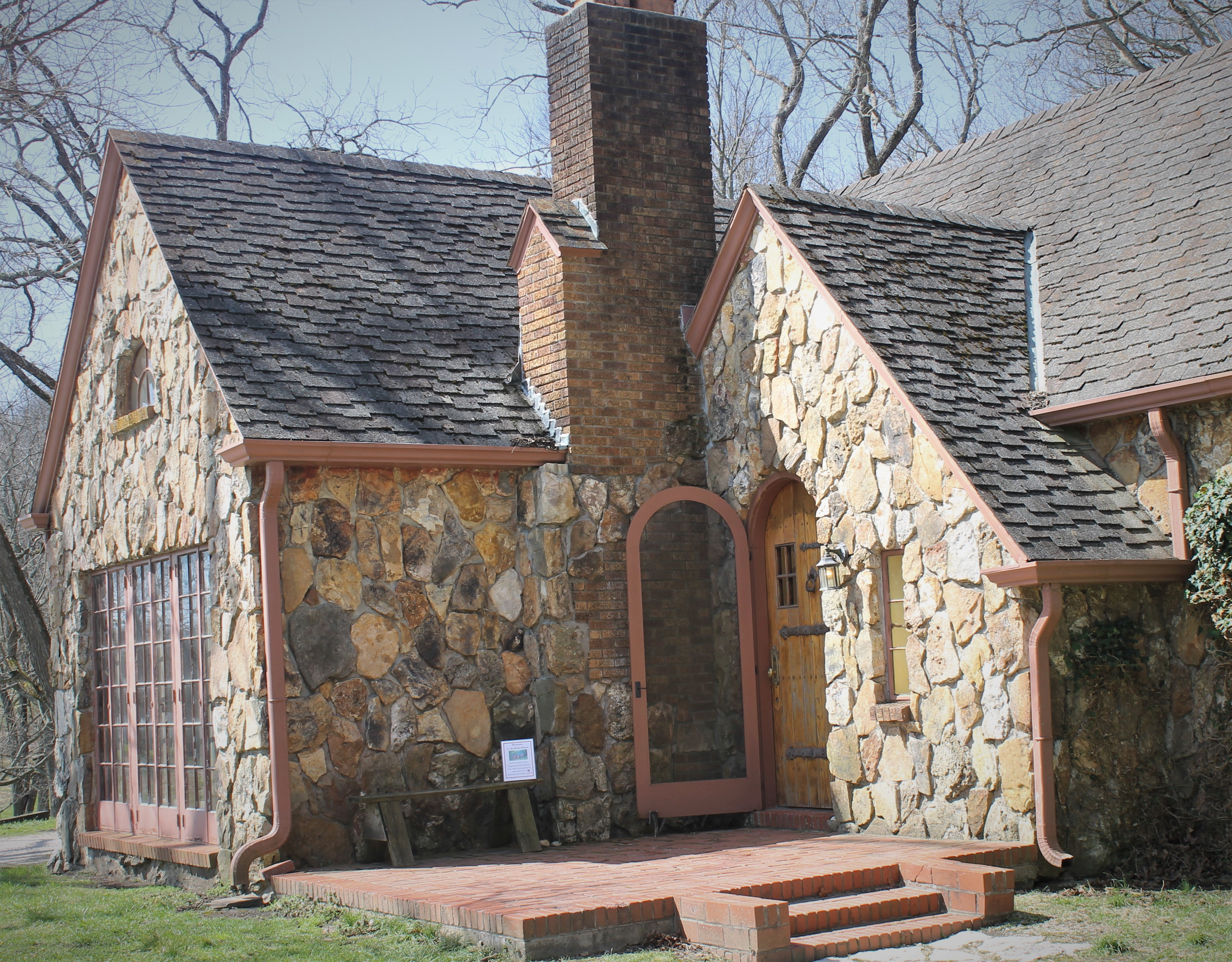
Rock House at Wilder complex

Evangelical theologian Timothy Paul Jones was born in Mansfield, Missouri.

== See also ==
- List of cities in Missouri
