= Missouri Route 38 =

State highway in Missouri, U.S.

Route 38

Route information
- Maintained by MoDOT
- Length: 80.561 mi (129.650 km)

Major junctions
- West end: US 65 south of Buffalo
- I-44 in Marshfield
- East end: Route 17 west of Houston

Location
- Country: United States
- State: Missouri

Highway system
- Missouri State Highway System; Interstate; US; State; Supplemental
← Route 37	→ Route 39

Route 38 is a highway in southern Missouri. Its eastern terminus is at Route 17 ten miles (16 km) west of Houston; its western terminus is at U.S. Route 65 about ten miles (16 km) south of Buffalo.

== Major intersections ==
County	Location	mi	km	Destinations	Notes
Dallas	Jackson Township	0.000	0.000	US 65 / Route TT – Buffalo, Fair Grove	Superstreet intersection
Webster	Marshfield	22.938	36.915	I-44 – Springfield, Rolla	
Wright	Hartville	50.689	81.576	Route 5 – Mansfield, Grovespring	
Wright	Van Buren Township	63.632	102.406	Route 95 – Manes, Mountain Grove	
Texas	Piney Township	80.561	129.650	Route 17 – Houston, Success	
1.000 mi = 1.609 km; 1.000 km = 0.621 mi
