= Hartville, Missouri =

City in Missouri, U.S.

- City
- City of Hartville
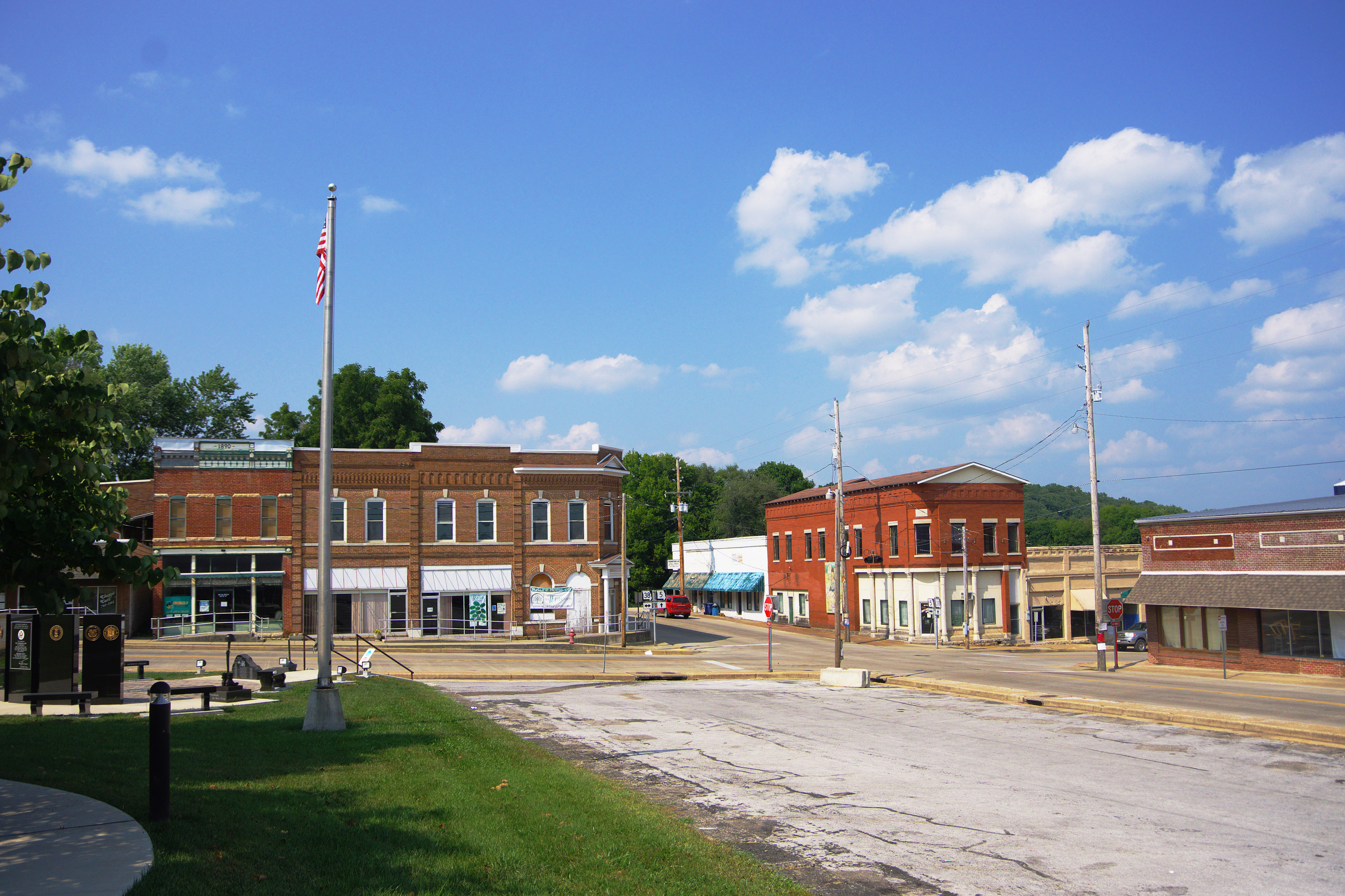
- Businesses at the intersection of Main Avenue (Route 5) and Rolla Street (Route 38), August 2021

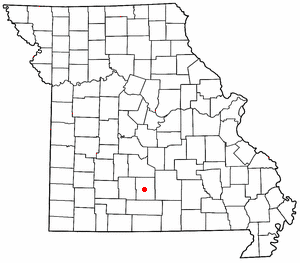
- Location of Hartville, Missouri
- Coordinates: 37°15′03″N 92°30′38″W
- Country: United States
- State: Missouri
- County: Wright

Area
  - Total: 0.66 sq mi (1.72 km^{2})
  - Land: 0.65 sq mi (1.69 km^{2})
  - Water: 0.012 sq mi (0.03 km^{2})
- Elevation: 1,191 ft (363 m)

Population (2020)
  - Total: 594
  - Density: 911/sq mi (351.9/km^{2})
- Time zone: UTC-6 (Central (CST))
  - Summer (DST): UTC-5 (CDT)
- ZIP code: 65667
- Area code: 417
- FIPS code: 29-30754
- GNIS feature ID: 0719185

Hartville is a city in and the county seat of Wright County, Missouri, United States. Its population was 594 at the 2020 census.

== History ==
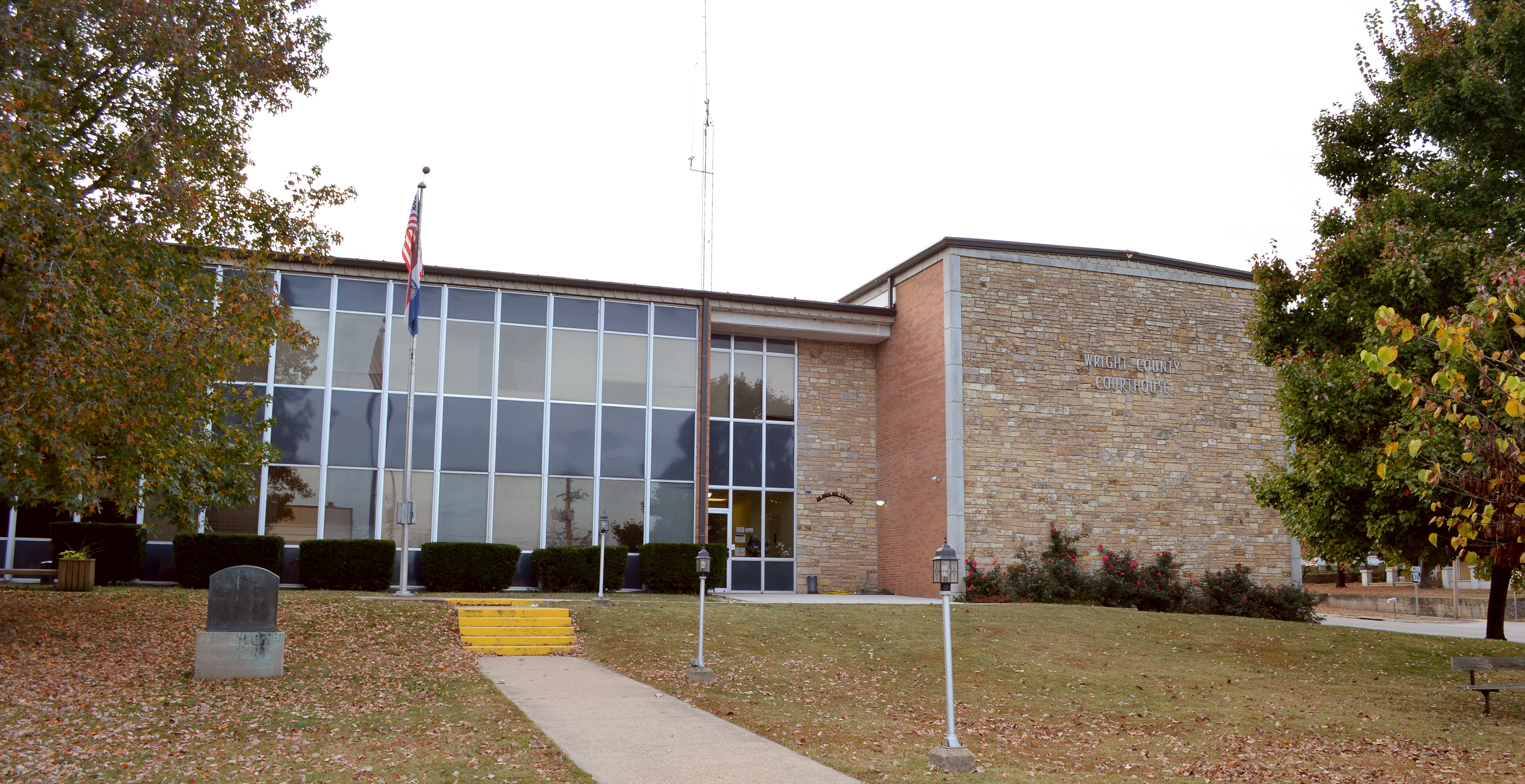
Wright County Courthouse, Hartville, October 2015

A post office called Hartville has been in operation since 1842. The community was settled in the early 19th century, and bears the name of Isaac Hart, a pioneer citizen.

Much of the town was destroyed during the Battle of Hartville in 1863. Lt. Col. John Wimer of the Confederacy, who had served two nonconsecutive terms as mayor of St. Louis, was killed in the battle and was buried at Hartville.

The Grovespring Tornado in 1959 destroyed most of Hartville's business district, including the post office. No major injuries occurred, since a warning alarm had given the citizens time to take cover.

Kelton House was listed on the National Register of Historic Places in 1983.

In the 2020 United States census, Hartville was designated the closest location to the mean center of the United States population.

== Geography ==
Hartville is located on Missouri Routes 5 and 38, along the Wood's Fork of the Gasconade River, which flows into the Gasconade just east of the community. According to the United States Census Bureau, the city has a total area of 0.66 square miles (1.71 km^{2}), of which 0.01 sq mi (0.03 km^{2}) is covered by water. The Census Bureau determined that the mean center of the United States population as of the 2020 census is located 15 miles (24 km) northeast of Hartville.

== Demographics ==
Historical population
Census	Pop.	Note	%±
1880	248		—
1900	445		—
1910	507		13.9%
1920	521		2.8%
1930	453		−13.1%
1940	393		−13.2%
1950	526		33.8%
1960	486		−7.6%
1970	524		7.8%
1980	576		9.9%
1990	495		−14.1%
2000	607		22.6%
2010	613		1.0%
2020	594		−3.1%
U.S. Decennial Census

=== 2010 census ===
As of the 2010 census, 613 people, 232 households, and 133 families lived in the city. The population density was 943.1 inhabitants per square mile (364.1/km^{2}). The 305 housing units had an average density of 469.2 per square mile (181.2/km^{2}). The racial makeup of the city was 97.9% White, 0.5% African American, 0.3% Native American, 0.3% Asian, and 1.0% from two or more races. Hispanics or Latinos of any race were 2.0% of the population.

Of the 232 households, 31.5% had children under 18 living with them, 37.5% were married couples living together, 14.7% had a female householder with no husband present, 5.2% had a male householder with no wife present, and 42.7% were not families. About 37.9% of all households were made up of individuals, and 18.9% had someone living alone who was 65 or older. The average household size was 2.34 and the average family size was 3.17.

The median age in the city was 38.5 years. The age distribution was 26.3% under 18, 8.6% from 18 to 24, 21%from 25 to 44; 22.4% from 45 to 64; and 21.7% were 65 or older. The gender makeup of the city was 48.6% male and 51.4% female.

=== 2000 census ===
As of the 2000 census, 607 people, 252 households, and 143 families resided in the city. The population density was 974.7 inhabitants per square mile (376.3/km^{2}). The 289 housing units at an average density of 464.1 per square mile (179.2/km^{2}). The racial makeup of the city was 97.36% White, 0.99% African American, 1.15% Native American, 0.16% Pacific Islander, and 0.33% from two or more races. Hispanics or Latinos of any race were 0.66% of the population.

Of the 252 households, 28.2% had children under 18 living with them, 43.7% were married couples living together, 9.9% had a female householder with no husband present, and 42.9% were not families. About 38.1% of all households were made up of individuals, and 27.0% had someone living alone who was 65 or older. The average household size was 2.16 and the average family size was 2.91.

In the city, the age distribution was 22.7% under 18, 8.4% from 18 to 24, 20.4% from 25 to 44, 21.1% from 45 to 64, and 27.3% who were 65 or older. The median age was 44 years. For every 100 females, there were 80.1 males. For every 100 females 18 and over, there were 77.7 males.

The median income for a household in the city was $17,222, and for a family was $27,115. Males had a median income of $20,000 versus $17,969 for females. The per capita income for the city was $11,360. About 18.0% of families and 24.3% of the population were below the poverty line, including 22.1% of those under 18 and 32.0% of those 65 or over.

== Education ==
Public education in Hartville is administered by Hartville R-II School District, which operates two elementary schools, one middle school, and Hartville High School.

Hartville has a lending library, a branch of the Wright County Library.

== Notable person ==
- Walter Mitchell, bishop of Arizona in the Episcopal Church

== See also ==
- List of cities in Missouri
