= Gasconade River =

River in central Missouri, United States

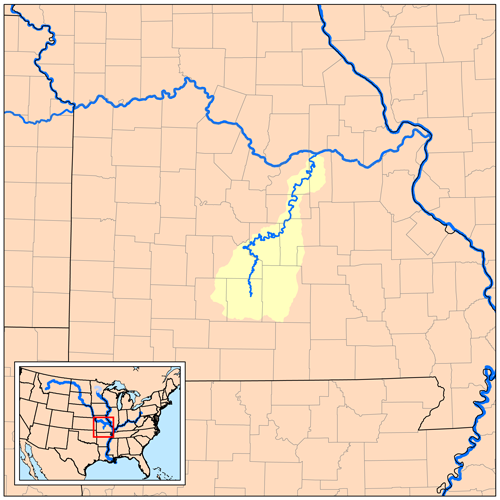

The Gasconade River is about 280 miles (450 km) long and is located in central and south-central Missouri.

The Gasconade River begins in the Ozarks southwest of Hartville in Wright County and flows generally north-northeastwardly through Wright, Laclede, Pulaski, Phelps, Maries, Osage and Gasconade counties, through portions of the Mark Twain National Forest. It flows into the Missouri River near the town of Gasconade in Gasconade County. At Rich Fountain, the river has a mean annual discharge of 3,097 cubic feet per second.

== Name ==
The name Gasconade is derived from "Gascon", an inhabitant of the French region of Gascony. The people of that province were noted for their boastfulness. It was applied by the early French to the Indians living on its banks who bragged about their exploits. The name means to boast or brag, and thus the river received its name. The waters of the river are boisterous and boastful and the name is also descriptive.

== River course ==
The headwaters of the Gasconade are in the southeastern corner of Webster County northeast of Seymour, Missouri where it drains the eastern margin of the Springfield Plateau at approximately 37°11′54″N 92°41′44″W. The river joins the Missouri River at the city of Gasconade at 38°40′28″N 91°32′55″W. The river follows a meandering course through the Ordovician age dolomite and sandstone bedrock of the Ozark Salem Plateau creating spectacular bluffs and incised meanders along the way. Numerous springs and caves occur within the drainage area and along the river course. Significant tributaries include the Osage Fork of Webster and Laclede counties and Roubidoux Creek and Big Piney River of Texas and Pulaski counties. The Roubidoux and Big Piney flow respectively along the west and east boundaries of Fort Leonard Wood which lies a short distance south and east of the Gasconade.

The plateau surface near the midpoint is 300 feet (91 metres) above the river bottom near the river midpoint northeast of Waynesville creating scenic river bluffs. At the junction with the Missouri the river bottom is about 400 feet (120 m) lower in elevation than the old plateau surface above the river. The elevation of the plateau rim at the headwaters is at or above 1,600 feet (490 m) with local hilltops at over 1,700 feet (520 m) (second highest elevation in Missouri near Cedar Gap). The elevation at the confluence with the Missouri is 500 feet (150 m) giving an overall drainage basin relief of 1,200 feet (370 m).

The Gasconade River is the longest river completely within the boundary of Missouri. It has been called one of the world's crookedest rivers.

== Recreational use ==
It is ranked with a difficulty of I and II (seldom) by those who canoe, kayak and float. It is considered a good float stream because there's typically not a heavy congestion of boats. It is common to go for many miles without seeing another boat.

There are caves and an abundance of wildlife along the river and is considered a popular place by anglers for its largemouth bass and smallmouth bass.

== See also ==
- List of Missouri rivers
- Gasconade Bridge train disaster

== Sources ==
- Columbia Gazetteer of North America entry
- DeLorme (2002). Missouri Atlas & Gazetteer. Yarmouth, Maine: DeLorme. ISBN 0-89933-353-2.
- U.S. Geological Survey Geographic Names Information System: Gasconade River
- Missouri Canoe - an electronic reprint of a Missouri Department of Conservation document
- Southwest Paddler
- Canoe Missouri
