= Wright County, Missouri =

County in Missouri, United States

- County
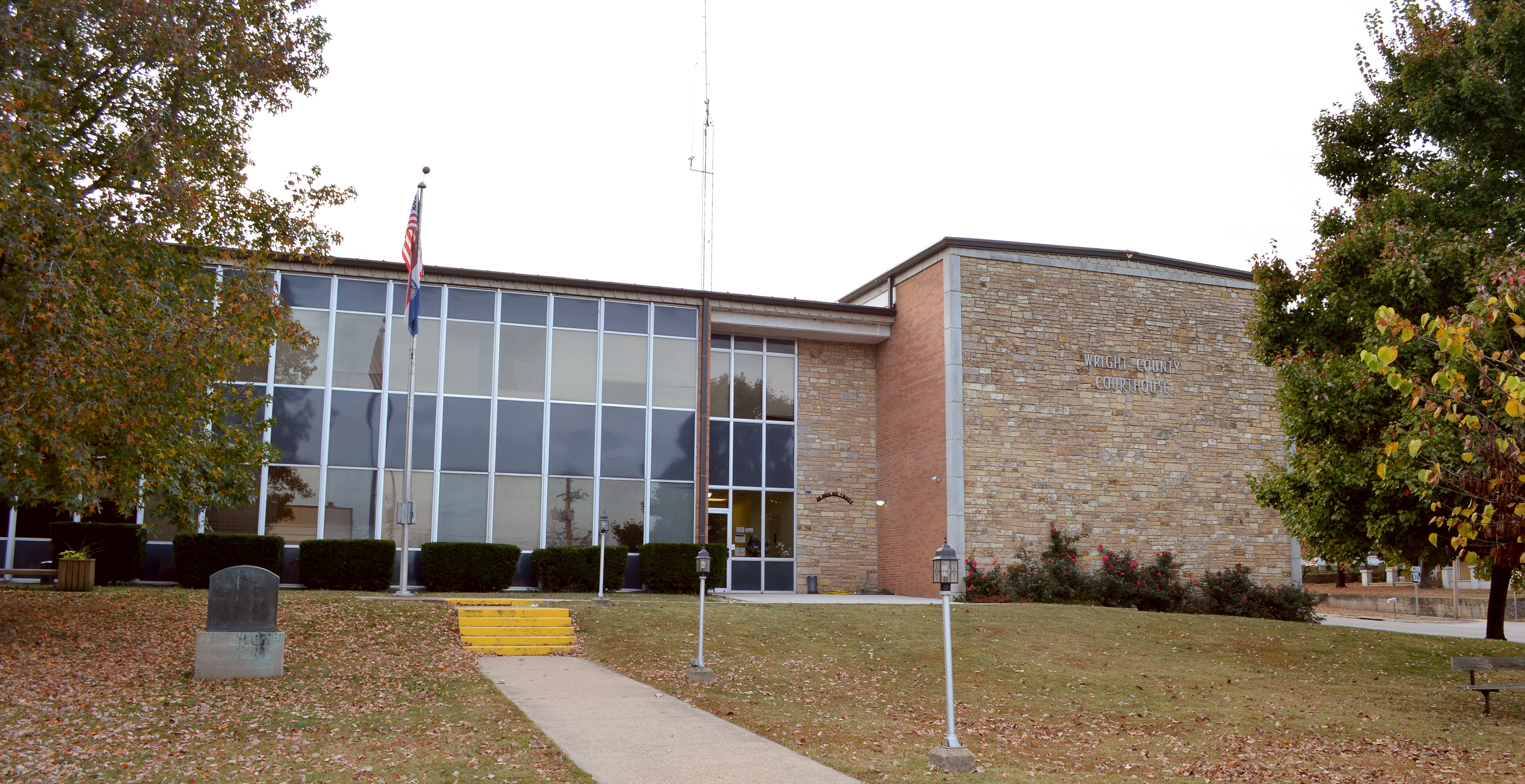
- Wright County Courthouse in Hartville

- Location within the U.S. state of Missouri
- Coordinates: 37°16′N 92°28′W
- Country: United States
- State: Missouri
- Founded: January 29, 1841
- Named for: Silas Wright
- Seat: Hartville
- Largest city: Mountain Grove

Area
  - Total: 683 sq mi (1,770 km^{2})
  - Land: 682 sq mi (1,770 km^{2})
  - Water: 1.4 sq mi (3.6 km^{2}) 0.2%

Population (2020)
  - Total: 18,188
  - Estimate (2025): 19,671 ▲
  - Density: 28.6/sq mi (11.0/km^{2})
- Time zone: UTC−6 (Central)
  - Summer (DST): UTC−5 (CDT)
- Congressional district: 8th
- Website: www.wrightcountymo.gov

Wright County is a county located in the southern portion of the U.S. state of Missouri. As of the 2020 census, the population was 18,188. Its county seat is Hartville. The county was officially organized on January 29, 1841, and is named after Silas Wright (D-New York), a former Congressman, U.S. Senator and Governor of New York.

As of the 2020 United States census, the U.S. Census Bureau recognized the mean center of the United States population to be within the county, near the community of Hartville.

== History ==
Wright County is bordered by Laclede County on the north, Texas County on the east, Douglas County on the south, and Webster County on the west. It is in the part of the state considered Southwest Missouri. Formed from part of Pulaski County on January 29, 1841, Wright County was named in honor of Silas Wright, a prominent New York Democrat. The county seat of Hartville was named after pioneer settler Isaac Hart. Wright County lost part of its land in 1845 to Texas County, in 1849 to Laclede, and in 1855 a big chunk to Webster.

It appears there were no Native American settlements early in the area, although the wandering Delawares, Shawnees, and Piankashaws did come through. Early white settlers were in the county in 1836 and were probably hunters. Earliest known settlers (by 1840) were Samuel Thompson, Robert Moore, John W. Burns, Jeff and Robert Montgomery, Benjamin Stephens, James Young, William Franklin, Isham Pool, and the Tuckers, according to Goodspeed.

The county has been devastated several times by storms. A tornado that swept through Southwest Missouri that devastated Webster County on April 18, 1880. A flood occurred April 22–23, 1885. Another tornado on May 8, 1888, did considerable damage, as did a hailstorm near the same time that reportedly left hail 3-4 inches deep and in drifts 5–8 feet high, after falling for two hours. Goodspeed gives great accounts of these storms, as well as others.

A good-sized portion of the county is located in the Mark Twain National Forest. The Gasconade River and its tributaries flow through the county, as well allowing for great recreational opportunities.

== Geography ==
According to the U.S. Census Bureau, the county has a total area of 683 square miles (1,770 km^{2}), of which 682 square miles (1,770 km^{2}) is land and 1.4 square miles (3.6 km^{2}) (0.2%) is water.

Wright County lies within the Salem Plateau region of the Ozarks. The bulk of the county is drained by the north flowing Gasconade River and its tributary streams. The southern edge of the county is drained by the south flowing headwaters of North Fork River. The terrain is moderately hilly.

=== Adjacent counties ===
- Laclede County (north)
- Webster County (west)
- Douglas County (south)
- Texas County (east)

=== Major highways ===
- U.S. Route 60
- Route 5
- Route 38
- Route 95

=== National protected area ===
- Mark Twain National Forest (part)

== Demographics ==
Historical population
| Census | Pop. | Note | %± |
|---|---|---|---|
| 1850 | 3,387 | | — |
| 1860 | 4,508 | | 33.1% |
| 1870 | 5,684 | | 26.1% |
| 1880 | 9,712 | | 70.9% |
| 1890 | 14,484 | | 49.1% |
| 1900 | 17,519 | | 21.0% |
| 1910 | 18,315 | | 4.5% |
| 1920 | 17,733 | | −3.2% |
| 1930 | 16,741 | | −5.6% |
| 1940 | 17,967 | | 7.3% |
| 1950 | 15,834 | | −11.9% |
| 1960 | 14,183 | | −10.4% |
| 1970 | 13,667 | | −3.6% |
| 1980 | 16,188 | | 18.4% |
| 1990 | 16,758 | | 3.5% |
| 2000 | 17,955 | | 7.1% |
| 2010 | 18,815 | | 4.8% |
| 2020 | 18,188 | | −3.3% |
| 2025 (est.) | 19,671 | ▲ | 8.2% |
U.S. Decennial Census; 1790-1960 1900-1990; 1990-2000 2010-2020

=== Racial and ethnic composition ===
Wright County, Missouri – Racial and ethnic composition Note: the US Census treats Hispanic/Latino as an ethnic category. This table excludes Latinos from the racial categories and assigns them to a separate category. Hispanics/Latinos may be of any race.
| Race / Ethnicity (NH = Non-Hispanic) | Pop 1980 | Pop 1990 | Pop 2000 | Pop 2010 | Pop 2020 | % 1980 | % 1990 | % 2000 | % 2010 | % 2020 |
|---|---|---|---|---|---|---|---|---|---|---|
| White alone (NH) | 15,935 | 16,524 | 17,440 | 18,123 | 16,654 | 98.44% | 98.60% | 97.13% | 96.32% | 91.57% |
| Black or African American alone (NH) | 36 | 36 | 49 | 87 | 111 | 0.22% | 0.21% | 0.27% | 0.46% | 0.61% |
| Native American or Alaska Native alone (NH) | 66 | 117 | 116 | 96 | 73 | 0.41% | 0.70% | 0.65% | 0.51% | 0.40% |
| Asian alone (NH) | 25 | 12 | 25 | 51 | 48 | 0.15% | 0.07% | 0.14% | 0.27% | 0.26% |
| Native Hawaiian or Pacific Islander alone (NH) | x | x | 1 | 8 | 5 | x | x | 0.01% | 0.04% | 0.03% |
| Other race alone (NH) | 8 | 8 | 8 | 3 | 59 | 0.05% | 0.05% | 0.04% | 0.02% | 0.32% |
| Mixed race or Multiracial (NH) | x | x | 177 | 209 | 868 | x | x | 0.99% | 1.11% | 4.77% |
| Hispanic or Latino (any race) | 118 | 61 | 139 | 238 | 370 | 0.73% | 0.36% | 0.77% | 1.26% | 2.03% |
| Total | 16,188 | 16,758 | 17,955 | 18,815 | 18,188 | 100.00% | 100.00% | 100.00% | 100.00% | 100.00% |

=== 2020 census ===
As of the 2020 census, the county had a population of 18,188 and a median age of 40.6 years. 25.8% of residents were under the age of 18 and 19.7% of residents were 65 years of age or older. For every 100 females, there were 97.5 males, and for every 100 females age 18 and over there were 95.5 males age 18 and over.

The racial makeup of the county was 92.4% White, 0.6% Black or African American, 0.4% American Indian and Alaska Native, 0.3% Asian, 0.0% Native Hawaiian and Pacific Islander, 0.7% from some other race, and 5.4% from two or more races. Hispanic or Latino residents of any race comprised 2.0% of the population.

Wright County Racial Composition
| Race | Num. | Perc. |
|---|---|---|
| White (NH) | 16,654 | 91.57% |
| Black or African American (NH) | 111 | 0.6% |
| Native American (NH) | 73 | 0.4% |
| Asian (NH) | 48 | 0.26% |
| Pacific Islander (NH) | 5 | 0.03% |
| Other/Mixed (NH) | 927 | 5.1% |
| Hispanic or Latino | 370 | 2% |

22.4% of residents lived in urban areas, while 77.6% lived in rural areas.

There were 7,182 households in the county, of which 30.2% had children under the age of 18 living with them and 25.3% had a female householder with no spouse or partner present. About 28.9% of all households were made up of individuals and 15.0% had someone living alone who was 65 years of age or older.

There were 8,347 housing units, of which 14.0% were vacant. Among occupied housing units, 70.4% were owner-occupied and 29.6% were renter-occupied. The homeowner vacancy rate was 2.3% and the rental vacancy rate was 10.6%.

=== 2000 census ===
As of the 2000 census, there were 17,955 people, 7,081 households, and 5,020 families residing in the county. The population density was 26 people per square mile (10 people/km^{2}). There were 7,957 housing units at an average density of 12 units per square mile (4.6/km^{2}). The racial makeup of the county was 97.61% White, 0.28% Black or African American, 0.66% Native American, 0.14% Asian, 0.01% Pacific Islander, 0.27% from other races, and 1.04% from two or more races. Approximately 0.77% of the population were Hispanic or Latino of any race.

There were 7,081 households, out of which 33.10% had children under the age of 18 living with them, 58.50% were married couples living together, 8.80% had a female householder with no husband present, and 29.10% were non-families. 26.30% of all households were made up of individuals, and 13.30% had someone living alone who was 65 years of age or older. The average household size was 2.50 and the average family size was 3.01.

In the county, the population was spread out, with 27.20% under the age of 18, 8.20% from 18 to 24, 25.30% from 25 to 44, 22.80% from 45 to 64, and 16.50% who were 65 years of age or older. The median age was 38 years. For every 100 females there were 94.30 males. For every 100 females age 18 and over, there were 90.60 males.

The median income for a household in the county was $30,685, and the median income for a family was $37,139. Males had a median income of $24,876 versus $17,608 for females. The per capita income for the county was $16,319. About 17.30% of families and 21.70% of the population were below the poverty line, including 29.10% of those under age 18 and 17.60% of those age 65 or over.

=== Religion ===
According to the Association of Religion Data Archives County Membership Report (2000), Wright County is a part of the Bible Belt with evangelical Protestantism being the majority religion. The most predominant denominations among residents in Wright County who adhere to a religion are Southern Baptists (49.92%), National Association of Free Will Baptists (19.84%), and Pentecostals (7.55%).

== Education ==
Of adults 25 years of age and older in Wright County, 71.1% possesses a high school diploma or higher while 9.8% holds a bachelor's degree or higher as their highest educational attainment.

=== Public schools ===
- Hartville R-II School District - Hartville
  - Grovespring Elementary School - Grovespring - (K-05)
  - Hartville Elementary School (PK-06)
  - Hartville High School (07-12)
- Mansfield R-IV School District - Mansfield
  - Wilder Elementary School (PK-05)
  - Mansfield Jr. High School (06-08)
  - Mansfield High School (09-12)
- Mountain Grove R-III School District - Mountain Grove
  - Mountain Grove Elementary School (K-04)
  - Mountain Grove Middle School (05-08)
  - Mountain Grove High School (09-12)
- Norwood R-I School District - Norwood
  - Norwood Elementary School (PK-04)
  - Norwood Middle School (05-08)
  - Norwood High School (09-12)
- Manes R-V School District - Manes
  - Manes Elementary School (K-08)

=== Private schools ===
- Mountain Grove Christian Academy - Mountain Grove - (PK-12) - Non-denominational Christian
- Liberty Faith Christian Academy - Norwood - (K-12) - Non-denominational Christian

=== Alternative and vocational schools ===
- Ozark Mountain Technical Center - Mountain Grove - (09-12) - Vocational/Technical
- Ozark Regional Juvenile Detention Center - Mountain Grove - (05-12) - Juvenile Hall
- Skyview State School - Mountain Grove - (K-12) - A school for handicapped students and those with other special needs.

=== Public libraries ===
- Wright County Library

== Politics ==
=== Local ===
Wright County, Missouri

Elected countywide officials
| Assessor | Brenda Day | Republican |
| Circuit Clerk | Joe Chadwell | Republican |
| County Clerk | Nelda Masner | Republican |
| Collector | Cindy Cottengim | Republican |
| Commissioner (presiding) | Zach Williams | Republican |
| Commissioner (district 1) | Tommy Gaddis | Republican |
| Commissioner (district 2) | Mike Sherman | Republican |
| Coroner | Ben Hurtt | Republican |
| Prosecuting Attorney | Jason W. MacPherson | Republican |
| Public Administrator | John T. Miller | Republican |
| Recorder | Amanda Hoffman | Republican |
| Sheriff | Glenn Adler | Republican |
| Surveyor | W. Andrew Daniel | Republican |
| Treasurer | Naomi Gray | Republican |

The Republican Party completely controls politics at the local level in Wright County. Republicans hold every elected position in the county.

=== State ===
All of Wright County is a part of the Missouri 141st District in the Missouri House of Representatives and is currently represented by Hannah Kelly (R-Mountain Grove).

Missouri House of Representatives — District 141 — Wright County (2016)
| Party | Candidate | Votes | % | ±% |
|---|---|---|---|---|
| Republican | Hannah Kelly | 6,910 | 100.00% | |

Missouri House of Representatives — District 141 — Wright County (2014)
| Party | Candidate | Votes | % | ±% |
|---|---|---|---|---|
| Republican | Tony Dugger | 3,591 | 100.00% | |

Missouri House of Representatives — District 141 — Wright County (2012)
| Party | Candidate | Votes | % | ±% |
|---|---|---|---|---|
| Republican | Tony Dugger | 6,899 | 100.00% | |

All of Wright County is a part of Missouri's 33rd District in the Missouri Senate and is currently represented by State Senator Mike Cunningham (R-Rogersville)

Missouri Senate — District 33 — Wright County (2016)
| Party | Candidate | Votes | % | ±% |
|---|---|---|---|---|
| Republican | Mike Cunningham | 7,098 | 100.00% | |

Missouri Senate — District 33 — Wright County (2012)
| Party | Candidate | Votes | % | ±% |
|---|---|---|---|---|
| Republican | Mike Cunningham | 6,834 | 100.00% | |

Past Gubernatorial Elections Results
| Year | Republican | Democratic | Third Parties |
|---|---|---|---|
| 2024 | 86.17% 7,697 | 12.16% 1,086 | 1.67% 149 |
| 2020 | 84.63% 7,343 | 13.61% 1,181 | 1.76% 153 |
| 2016 | 73.93% 5,993 | 23.40% 1,897 | 2.66% 216 |
| 2012 | 61.13% 4,866 | 36.16% 2,878 | 2.71% 216 |
| 2008 | 49.57% 4,198 | 47.53% 4,025 | 2.90% 245 |
| 2004 | 71.37% 5,955 | 27.33% 2,280 | 1.30% 109 |
| 2000 | 62.56% 4,872 | 35.73% 2,783 | 1.71% 133 |
| 1996 | 62.03% 4,310 | 35.13% 2,441 | 2.84% 197 |
| 1992 | 56.36% 4,280 | 43.64% 3,314 | 0.00% 0 |
| 1988 | 74.68% 4,789 | 24.92% 1,598 | 0.41% 26 |
| 1984 | 74.30% 4,928 | 25.70% 1,705 | 0.00% 0 |
| 1980 | 60.21% 4,035 | 39.67% 2,659 | 0.12% 8 |
| 1976 | 61.66% 3,780 | 38.29% 2,347 | 0.05% 3 |

=== Federal ===
U.S. Senate — Missouri — Wright County (2016)
| Party | Candidate | Votes | % | ±% |
|---|---|---|---|---|
| Republican | Roy Blunt | 5,930 | 73.29% | +17.39 |
| Democratic | Jason Kander | 1,836 | 22.69% | −13.92 |
| Libertarian | Jonathan Dine | 176 | 2.18% | −5.31 |
| Green | Johnathan McFarland | 60 | 0.74% | +0.74 |
| Constitution | Fred Ryman | 89 | 1.10% | +1.10 |

U.S. Senate — Missouri — Wright County (2012)
| Party | Candidate | Votes | % | ±% |
|---|---|---|---|---|
| Republican | Todd Akin | 4,402 | 55.90% | |
| Democratic | Claire McCaskill | 2,883 | 36.61% | |
| Libertarian | Jonathan Dine | 590 | 7.49% | |

Wright County is included in Missouri's 8th Congressional District and is currently represented by Jason T. Smith (R-Salem) in the U.S. House of Representatives. Smith won a special election on Tuesday, June 4, 2013, to finish out the remaining term of U.S. Representative Jo Ann Emerson (R-Cape Girardeau). Emerson announced her resignation a month after being reelected with over 70 percent of the vote in the district. She resigned to become CEO of the National Rural Electric Cooperative.

U.S. House of Representatives — District 8 — Wright County (2016)
| Party | Candidate | Votes | % | ±% |
|---|---|---|---|---|
| Republican | Jason Smith | 6,594 | 83.19% | +5.05 |
| Democratic | Dave Cowell | 1,150 | 14.51% | −1.28 |
| Libertarian | Jonathan Shell | 182 | 2.30% | +0.00 |

U.S. House of Representatives — District 8 — Wright County (2014)
| Party | Candidate | Votes | % | ±% |
|---|---|---|---|---|
| Republican | Jason Smith | 3,157 | 78.14% | −2.27 |
| Democratic | Barbara Stocker | 638 | 15.79% | −1.18 |
| Libertarian | Rick Vandeven | 93 | 2.30% | +1.16 |
| Constitution | Doug Enyart | 56 | 1.39% | −0.09 |
| Independent | Terry Hampton | 96 | 2.38% | +2.38 |

U.S. House of Representatives — District 8 — Special Election – Wright County (2013)
| Party | Candidate | Votes | % | ±% |
|---|---|---|---|---|
| Republican | Jason T. Smith | 1,412 | 80.41 | +1.34 |
| Democratic | Steve Hodges | 298 | 16.97 | −0.12 |
| Libertarian | Bill Slantz | 20 | 1.14 | −2.70 |
| Constitution | Doug Enyart | 26 | 1.48 | +1.48 |

U.S. House of Representatives — District 8 — Wright County (2012)
| Party | Candidate | Votes | % | ±% |
|---|---|---|---|---|
| Republican | Jo Ann Emerson | 6,172 | 79.07% | |
| Democratic | Jack Rushin | 1,334 | 17.09% | |
| Libertarian | Rick Vandeven | 300 | 3.84% | |

==== Political culture ====
United States presidential election results for Wright County, Missouri
| Year | Republican | | Democratic | | Third party(ies) | |
| Year | No. | % | No. | % | No. | % |
|---|---|---|---|---|---|---|
| 1888 | 1,372 | 50.97% | 771 | 28.64% | 549 | 20.39% |
| 1892 | 1,454 | 50.17% | 786 | 27.12% | 658 | 22.71% |
| 1896 | 1,755 | 49.58% | 1,777 | 50.20% | 8 | 0.23% |
| 1900 | 1,703 | 52.18% | 1,500 | 45.96% | 61 | 1.87% |
| 1904 | 1,972 | 58.80% | 1,266 | 37.75% | 116 | 3.46% |
| 1908 | 2,149 | 58.21% | 1,469 | 39.79% | 74 | 2.00% |
| 1912 | 1,163 | 32.97% | 1,356 | 38.45% | 1,008 | 28.58% |
| 1916 | 2,176 | 56.29% | 1,593 | 41.21% | 97 | 2.51% |
| 1920 | 3,661 | 63.69% | 2,008 | 34.93% | 79 | 1.37% |
| 1924 | 3,105 | 55.04% | 2,303 | 40.83% | 233 | 4.13% |
| 1928 | 4,504 | 69.28% | 1,973 | 30.35% | 24 | 0.37% |
| 1932 | 3,023 | 43.51% | 3,862 | 55.58% | 63 | 0.91% |
| 1936 | 4,837 | 59.18% | 3,296 | 40.32% | 41 | 0.50% |
| 1940 | 5,096 | 64.98% | 2,727 | 34.77% | 20 | 0.26% |
| 1944 | 4,413 | 67.51% | 2,116 | 32.37% | 8 | 0.12% |
| 1948 | 3,542 | 58.47% | 2,505 | 41.35% | 11 | 0.18% |
| 1952 | 5,285 | 72.31% | 2,006 | 27.45% | 18 | 0.25% |
| 1956 | 4,360 | 65.68% | 2,278 | 34.32% | 0 | 0.00% |
| 1960 | 5,191 | 72.66% | 1,953 | 27.34% | 0 | 0.00% |
| 1964 | 3,466 | 51.29% | 3,292 | 48.71% | 0 | 0.00% |
| 1968 | 3,576 | 66.22% | 1,337 | 24.76% | 487 | 9.02% |
| 1972 | 4,350 | 76.08% | 1,368 | 23.92% | 0 | 0.00% |
| 1976 | 3,397 | 54.87% | 2,781 | 44.92% | 13 | 0.21% |
| 1980 | 4,451 | 66.27% | 2,182 | 32.49% | 83 | 1.24% |
| 1984 | 4,687 | 70.38% | 1,973 | 29.62% | 0 | 0.00% |
| 1988 | 4,151 | 64.92% | 2,232 | 34.91% | 11 | 0.17% |
| 1992 | 3,427 | 44.60% | 2,814 | 36.62% | 1,443 | 18.78% |
| 1996 | 3,754 | 53.67% | 2,280 | 32.59% | 961 | 13.74% |
| 2000 | 5,391 | 68.75% | 2,250 | 28.70% | 200 | 2.55% |
| 2004 | 6,090 | 72.97% | 2,188 | 26.22% | 68 | 0.81% |
| 2008 | 5,784 | 67.94% | 2,557 | 30.03% | 173 | 2.03% |
| 2012 | 5,830 | 73.29% | 1,953 | 24.55% | 172 | 2.16% |
| 2016 | 6,707 | 82.61% | 1,170 | 14.41% | 242 | 2.98% |
| 2020 | 7,453 | 85.28% | 1,168 | 13.37% | 118 | 1.35% |
| 2024 | 7,850 | 87.42% | 1,057 | 11.77% | 73 | 0.81% |

Like most counties situated in Southwest Missouri, Wright County is a Republican stronghold in presidential elections. George W. Bush carried Wright County in 2000 and 2004 by more than two-to-one margins, and like many other rural counties throughout Missouri, Wright County strongly favored John McCain over Barack Obama in 2008, Mitt Romney in 2012, and Donald Trump over Hillary Clinton in 2016. No Democratic presidential nominee has won Wright County in more than 80 years.

Like most rural areas throughout the Bible Belt in Southwest Missouri, voters in Wright County traditionally adhere to socially and culturally conservative principles which tend to strongly influence their Republican leanings. In 2004, Missourians voted on a constitutional amendment to define marriage as the union between a man and a woman—it overwhelmingly passed Wright County with 86.28 percent of the vote. The initiative passed the state with 71 percent of support from voters as Missouri became the first state to ban same-sex marriage. In 2006, Missourians voted on a constitutional amendment to fund and legalize embryonic stem cell research in the state—it failed in Wright County with 64.84 percent voting against the measure. The initiative narrowly passed the state with 51 percent of support from voters as Missouri became one of the first states in the nation to approve embryonic stem cell research. Despite Wright County's longstanding tradition of supporting socially conservative platforms, voters in the county have a penchant for advancing populist causes like increasing the minimum wage. In 2006, Missourians voted on a proposition (Proposition B) to increase the minimum wage in the state to $6.50 an hour—it passed Wright County with 70.99 percent of the vote. The proposition strongly passed every single county in Missouri with 78.99 percent voting in favor as the minimum wage was increased to $6.50 an hour in the state. During the same election, voters in five other states also strongly approved increases in the minimum wage.

=== Missouri presidential preference primary (2008) ===
Former Governor Mike Huckabee (R-Arkansas) received more votes, a total of 1,878, than any candidate from either party in Wright County during the 2008 presidential primary. He also received more votes than the total number of votes cast in the entire Democratic Primary in Wright County. Wright County was Huckabee's strongest county in Missouri.

== Communities ==
=== Cities ===
- Hartville (county seat)
- Mansfield
- Mountain Grove (partly in Texas County)
- Norwood

=== Census-designated place ===
- Grovespring

=== Unincorporated communities ===
- Astoria
- Boyer
- Cedar Gap
- Dawson
- Duggan
- Duncan
- Fuson
- Graff
- Jerktail
- Macomb
- Manes
- Odin
- Owens
- Rayborn
- Smittle
- St. George
- Talmage
- Umpire

== See also ==
- National Register of Historic Places listings in Wright County, Missouri
