= Missouri's 16th Senate district =

American legislative district

Missouri's 16th State Senate district
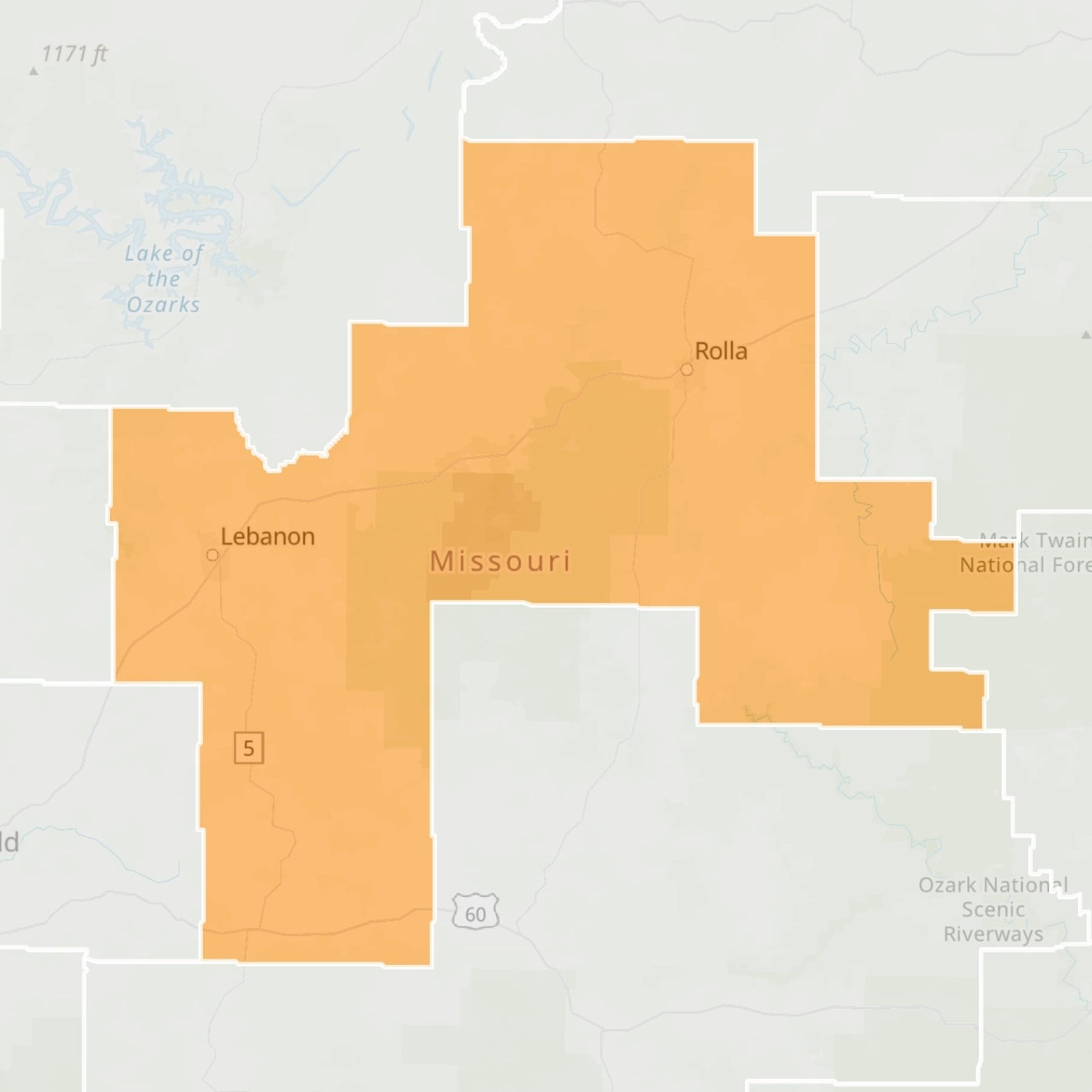
Senator
Justin Brown; R–Rolla
- Demographics: 83% White; 4% Black; 5% Hispanic; 2% Asian; 5% Multiracial
- Population (2023): 176,706

Missouri's 16th Senatorial District is one of 34 districts in the Missouri Senate. The district has been represented by Republican Justin Brown since 2019.

== Geography ==
The district is based in south-central Missouri and includes Dent, Laclede, Maries, Phelps, Pulaski and Wright counties. Major municipalities in the district include Lebanon, Rolla, St. Robert, Waynesville, and the U.S. Army installation Fort Leonard Wood. The district is also home to Missouri University of Science and Technology.

== 2026 candidates ==
=== Republican primary ===
- Bill Hardwick, representative of Missouri House District 121
- Hannah Kelly, former representative of Missouri House District 141
- Jeff Knight, representative of Missouri House District 142
- Philip Lohmann, returning candidate
- Donald Mayhew, representative of Missouri House District 124
- Joseph Steelman, businessman and son of former Senator Sarah Steelman

== Election results (1998–2022) ==
=== 1998 ===
Missouri's 16th Senatorial District election (1998)
Party	Candidate	Votes	%
Republican	Sarah Steelman	31,177	58.0
Democratic	Mike Lybyer	22,555	42.0
Total votes		53,732	100.0

=== 2002 ===
Missouri's 16th Senatorial District election (2002)
Party	Candidate	Votes	%
Republican	Sarah Steelman (incumbent)	36,288	71.1
Democratic	Clara Ichord	14,728	28.9
Total votes		51,016	100.0
Republican hold			

=== 2005 ===
Missouri's 16th Senatorial District special election (2005)
Party	Candidate	Votes	%
Democratic	Frank Barnitz	13,236	53.1
Republican	Bill Hickle	11,686	46.9
Total votes		24,922	100.0
Democratic gain from Republican			

=== 2006 ===
Missouri's 16th Senatorial District election (2006)
Party	Candidate	Votes	%
Democratic	Frank Barnitz (incumbent)	30,434	52.4
Republican	Susie Snyders	27,607	47.6
Total votes		58,041	100.0
Democratic hold			

=== 2010 ===
Missouri's 16th Senatorial District election (2010)
Party	Candidate	Votes	%
Republican	Dan W. Brown	31,792	58.3
Democratic	Frank Barnitz (incumbent)	22,760	41.7
Total votes		54,552	100.0
Republican gain from Democratic			

=== 2014 ===
Missouri's 16th Senatorial District election (2014)
Party	Candidate	Votes	%
Republican	Dan W. Brown (incumbent)	31,829	100.0
Total votes		31,829	100.0
Republican hold			

=== 2018 ===
Missouri's 16th Senatorial District election (2018)
Party	Candidate	Votes	%
Republican	Justin Dan Brown	42,382	70.1
Democratic	Ryan Dillon	18,097	29.9
Total votes		60,479	100.0
Republican hold			

=== 2022 ===
Missouri's 16th Senatorial District election (2022)
Party	Candidate	Votes	%
Republican	Justin Dan Brown (incumbent)	39,087	80.7
Democratic	Tara Anura	9,363	19.3
Total votes		48,450	100.0
Republican hold			

== Statewide election results ==
Year	Office	Results
2008	President	McCain 63.8 – 33.8%
2012	President	Romney 71.0 – 29.0%
2016	President	Trump 76.2 – 19.6%
2016	Senate	Blunt 66.2 – 29.1%
2016	Governor	Greitens 68.0 – 28.5%
2018	Senate	Hawley 70.3 – 26.2%
2020	President	Trump 76.9 – 21.3%
2020	Governor	Parson 76.4 – 21.2%
