= 2013 United States House of Representatives elections =

- April 9, 2013 – December 17, 2013

6 of the 435 seats in the United States House of Representatives 218 seats needed for a majority
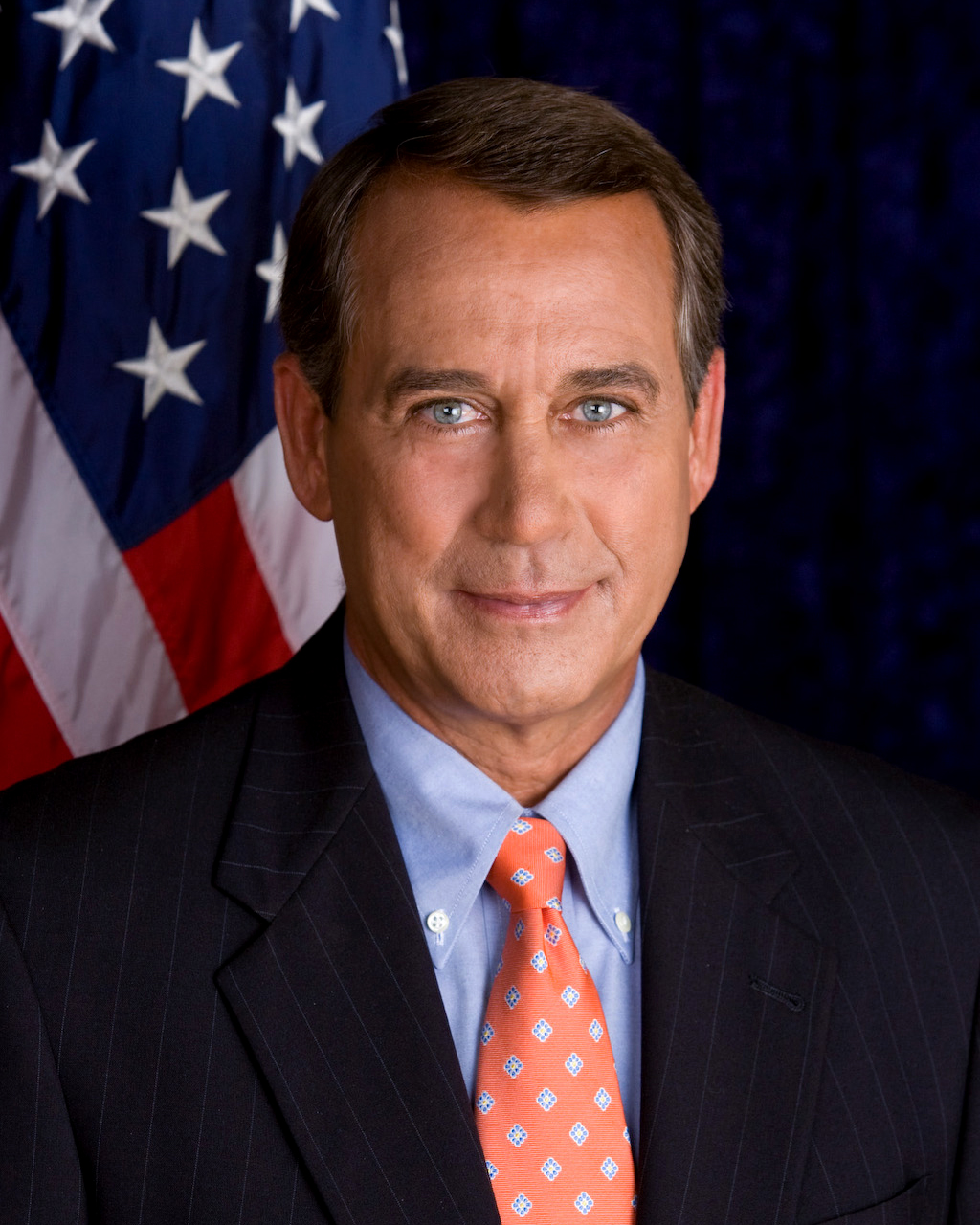

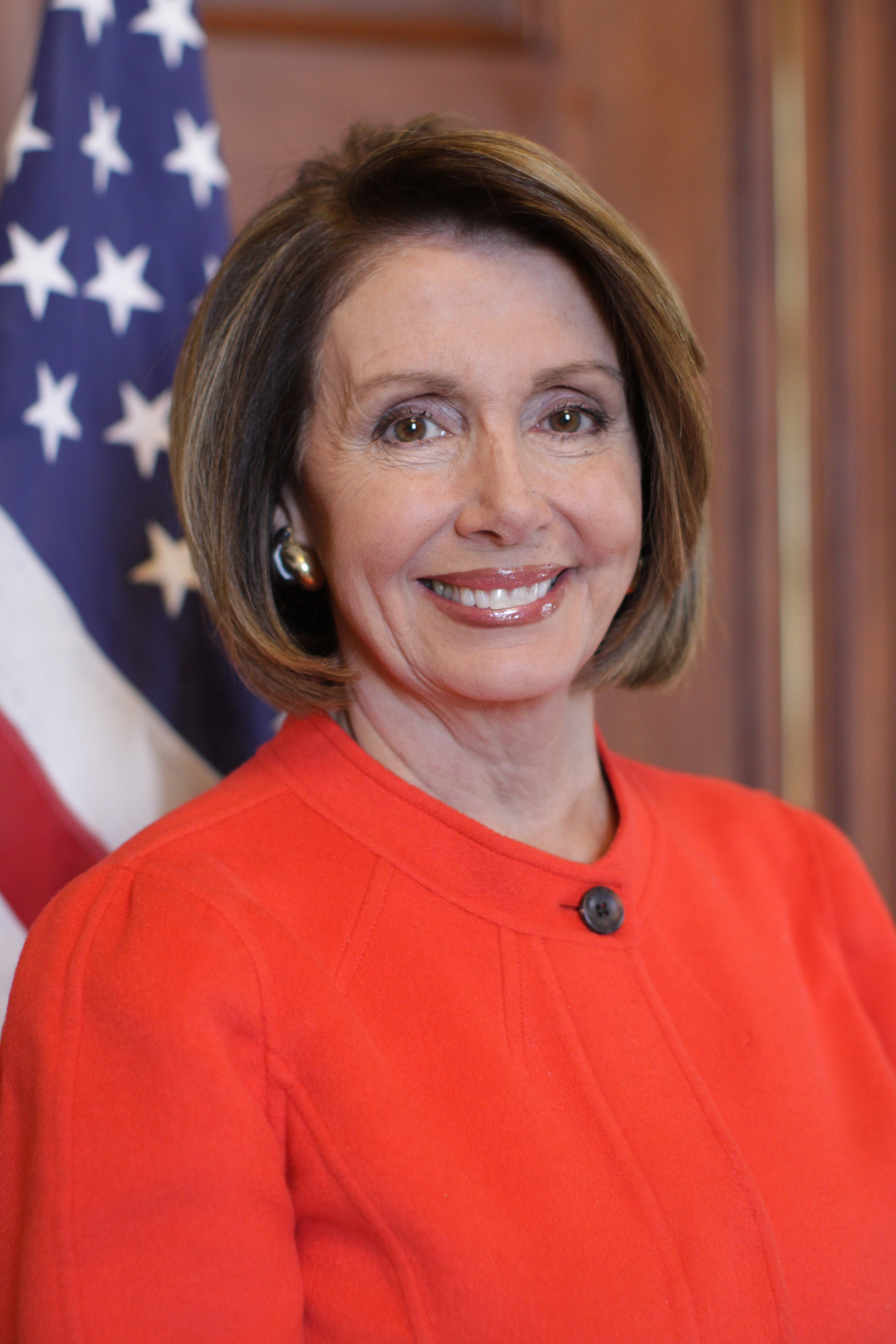
	Majority party	Minority party
Leader	John Boehner	Nancy Pelosi
Party	Republican	Democratic
Leader since	January 3, 2007	January 3, 2003
Leader's seat	Ohio 8th	California 12th
Last election	234 seats	201 seats
Seats won	4	2
Seat change	Steady	Steady
- Results: Democratic hold Republican hold

These six off-year races featured special elections to the 113th United States Congress to fill vacancies due to resignations in the United States House of Representatives. Two were due to Congressmen taking seats in the United States Senate, one resigned to take jobs in the private sector, one resigned to take a job in the public sector, and one resigned due to an impending federal indictment regarding misuse of campaign funds.

== Summary ==
All six seats were held by the party of the incumbent.

District	Incumbent			This race	
District	Member	Party	First elected	Results	Candidates
Illinois 2	Jesse Jackson Jr.	Democratic	1995 (special)	Incumbent won reelection, but resigned November 21, 2012 on the previous Congress, and declined to be seated at the current Congress. A special election was held April 9, 2013. Democratic hold.	▌ ✓ Robin Kelly (Democratic) 70.72%; ▌Paul McKinley (Republican) 22.10%; ▌Elizabeth Pahlke (Independent) 3.04%; ▌LeAlan Jones (Green) 1.84%; ▌Marcus Lewis (Independent) 1.63%; ▌Curtiss Llong Bey (Independent) 0.66%
South Carolina 1	Tim Scott	Republican	2010	Incumbent won reelection, but resigned January 2, 2013 after being appointed U.S. Senator. A special election was held May 7, 2013. Republican hold.	▌ ✓ Mark Sanford (Republican) 54.03%; ▌Elizabeth Colbert Busch (Democratic) 45.22%; ▌Eugene Platt (Green) 0.48%
Missouri 8	Jo Ann Emerson	Republican	1996 (special)	Incumbent resigned January 22, 2013. A special election was held June 4, 2013. Republican hold.	▌ ✓ Jason Smith (Republican) 67.14%; ▌Steve Hodges (Democratic) 27.41%; ▌Doug Enyart (Constitution) 3.61%; ▌Bill Slantz (Libertarian) 1.54%
Massachusetts 5	Ed Markey	Democratic	1976 (special)	Incumbent resigned July 15, 2013. A special election was held December 10, 2013. Democratic hold.	▌ ✓ Katherine Clark (Democratic) 65.99%; ▌Frank Addivinola (Republican) 31.64%; ▌James Aulenti (Independent) 1.63%; ▌James Hall (Independent) 0.74%
Alabama 1	Jo Bonner	Republican	2002	Incumbent resigned August 2, 2013. A special election was held December 17, 2013. Republican hold.	▌ ✓ Bradley Byrne (Republican) 70.66%; ▌Burton LeFlore (Democratic) 29.34%
Louisiana 5	Rodney Alexander	Republican	2002	Incumbent resigned September 26, 2013. A special election was held November 16, 2013. Republican hold.	▌ ✓ Vance McAllister (Republican) 59.65%; ▌Neil Riser (Republican) 40.35%

== Illinois's 2nd congressional district ==
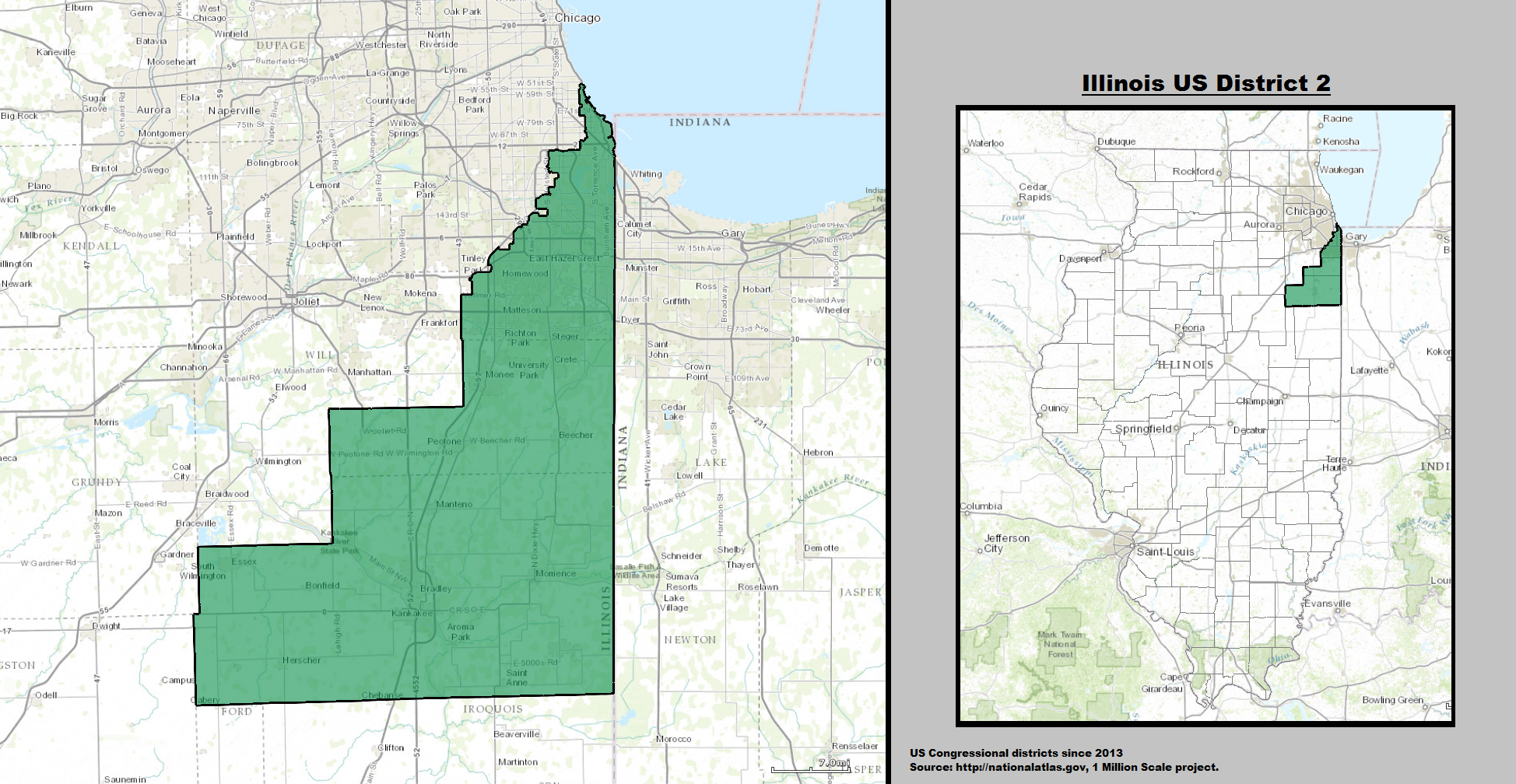
Illinois's 2nd congressional district

Jesse Jackson, Jr. resigned on November 21, 2012, following a months-long battle with bipolar disorder and due to being subject to a federal investigation over the possible misuse of campaign funds. Illinois Gov. Pat Quinn first scheduled the primary elections for February 26, coinciding with municipal primary elections, and initially set the general election for March 19. However, legislation was enacted at Quinn's request to allow the general election to coincide with municipal general elections held on April 9.

Democratic nominee Robin Kelly defeated Republican nominee Paul McKinley on April 9, 2013, taking 71 percent of about 82,000 votes cast. Kelly was sworn into Congress on April 11, 2013.

2013 Illinois's 2nd congressional district special election
Party	Candidate	Votes	%
Democratic	Robin Kelly	58,834	70.72
Republican	Paul McKinley	18,387	22.10
Independent	Elizabeth Pahlke	2,525	3.04
Green	LeAlan Jones	1,531	1.84
Independent	Marcus Lewis	1,359	1.63
Independent	Curtis Llong Bey	548	0.66
Write-in		9	0.01
Total votes		83,193	100.00
Democratic hold			

== South Carolina's 1st congressional district ==
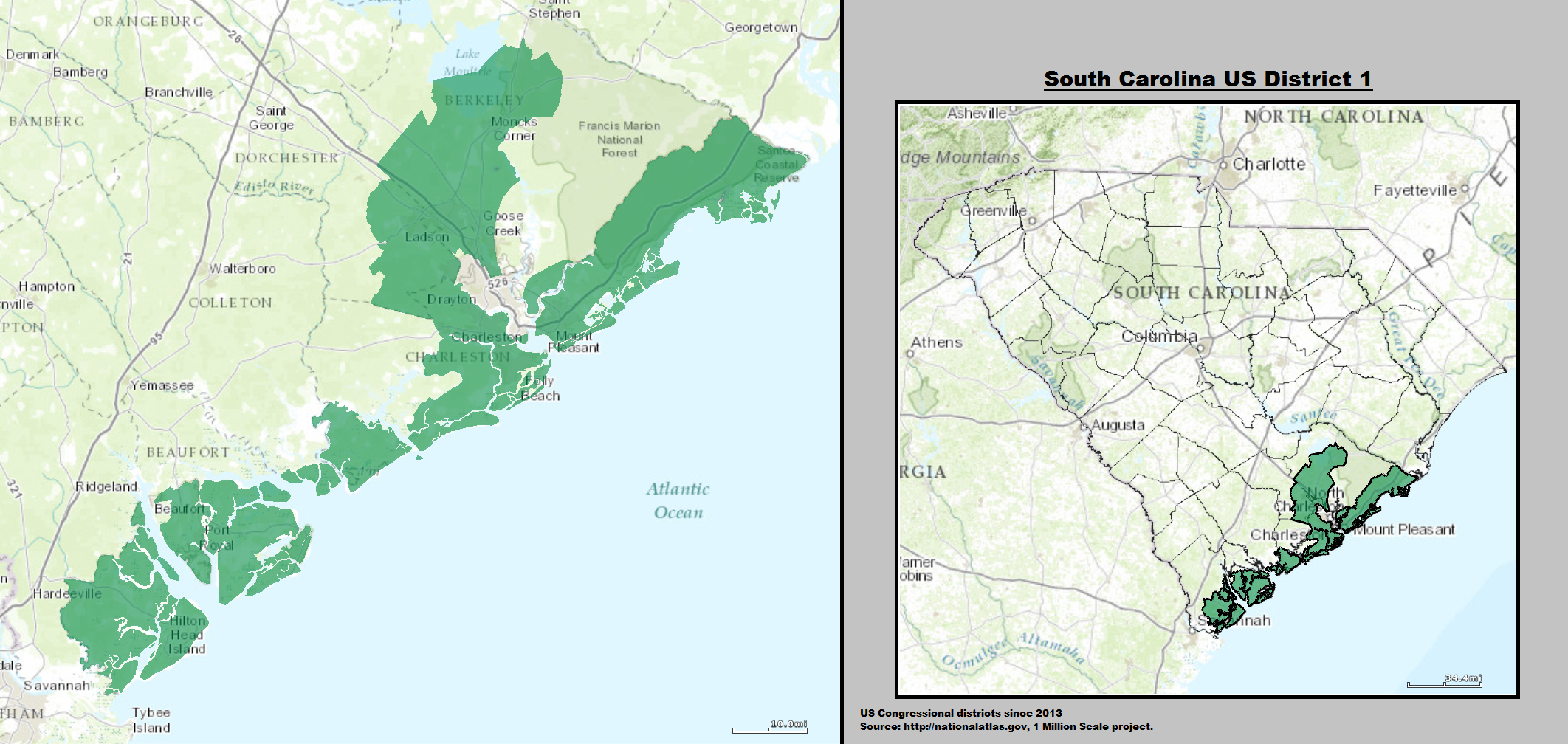
South Carolina's 1st congressional district

On December 17, 2012, South Carolina Gov. Nikki Haley announced the appointment of incumbent Republican Tim Scott to the United States Senate to replace the resigning Jim DeMint. Scott's resignation from Congress became effective January 2, 2013 and Haley ordered the special election to replace him on the same day, with primary election being held on March 19, with runoffs on April 2 and the general election on May 7. On March 19, 2013, former Gov. Mark Sanford, who held the seat from 1995 to 2001, with 36 percent, and former Charleston County Councilman Curtis Bostic, with 13 percent, placed in the top two of a 16-person field, advanced from the Republican primary to a runoff on April 2, 2013. Sanford defeated Bostic in the runoff with 57 percent of over 46,000 votes cast.

On May 7, 2013, Sanford defeated Democratic nominee Elizabeth Colbert Busch, sister of comedian Stephen Colbert, taking 54 percent of over 140,000 votes cast. Sanford was sworn into Congress on May 15, 2013.

2013 South Carolina's 1st congressional district special election
Party	Candidate	Votes	%
Republican	Mark Sanford	77,600	54.03
Democratic	Elizabeth Colbert Busch	64,961	45.22
Green	Eugene Platt	690	0.48
Write-in		384	0.27
Total votes		143,635	100.00
Republican hold			

== Missouri's 8th congressional district ==
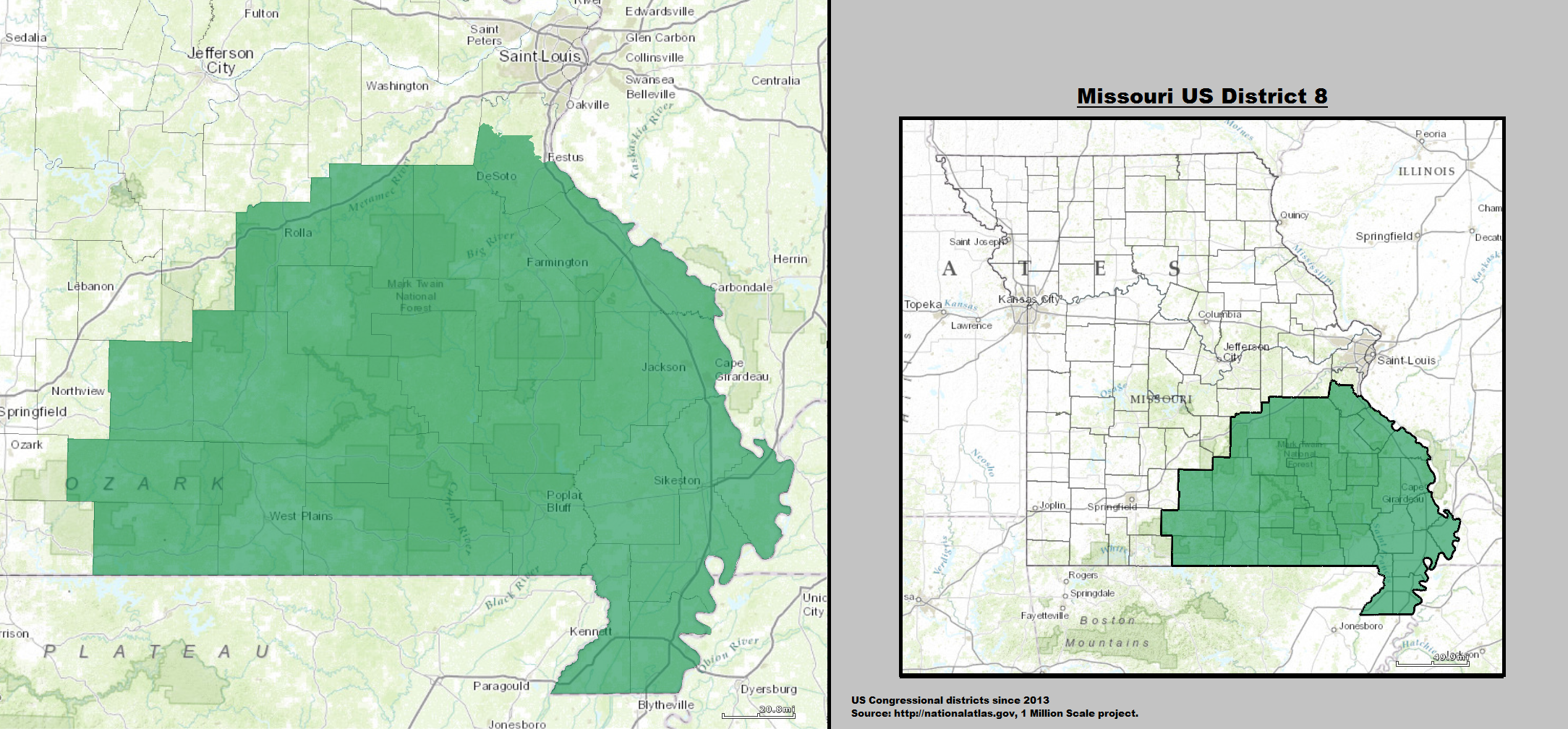
Missouri's 8th congressional district

On December 3, 2012, incumbent Republican Jo Ann Emerson announced her intention to resign from Congress, which became effective on January 22, 2013, to become the CEO of the National Rural Electric Cooperative Association in March 2013. State law allows the Republican and Democratic parties to select their own nominees without a primary. Gov. Jay Nixon set the date for the special election to be June 4, 2013. Missouri state representative Jason Smith was chosen as the GOP candidate on February 9, 2013. The Missouri Democratic Party chose state representative John Hodges as its nominee on February 16, 2013. Also on the Special General Election Ballot were Libertarian Party nominee Bill Slantz and Constitution Party nominee Doug Enyart. Smith was easily elected on June 4, 2013, taking 68 percent of the vote and was sworn in by House Speaker John Boehner on June 5, 2013 in a ceremony that was attended by most of Missouri's congressional delegation, Emerson and Missouri's Republican senator Roy Blunt.

2013 Missouri's 8th congressional district special election
Party	Candidate	Votes	%
Republican	Jason Smith	42,141	67.14
Democratic	Steve Hodges	17,207	27.41
Constitution	Doug Enyart	2,265	3.61
Libertarian	Bill Slantz	968	1.54
Write-in		185	0.29
Total votes		62,766	100.00
Republican hold			

== Massachusetts's 5th congressional district ==
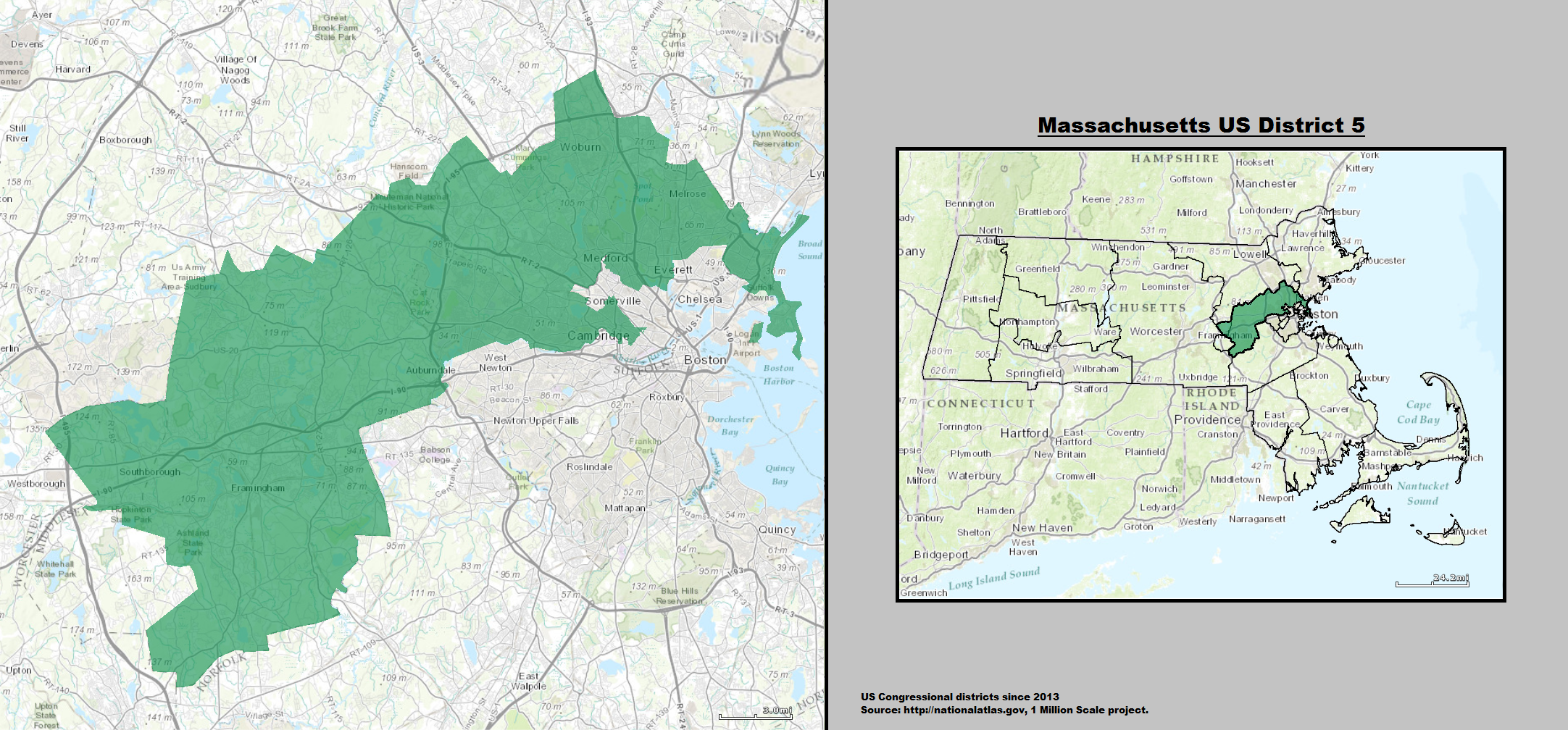
Massachusetts's 5th congressional district

On June 25, 2013, 20-term incumbent Democrat Ed Markey defeated Republican Gabriel Gomez in the special election to fill the remaining 18-months of the unexpired term of the Class II United States Senate seat caused by senator John Kerry's confirmation as Secretary of State. Markey resigned from the House of Representatives on July 15, 2013. The special election was scheduled for December 10, 2013. Its primary elections took place on October 15. The Democrat is state senator Katherine Clark and the Republican is lawyer Frank Addivinola.

Clark defeated Addivinola on December 10, 2013, with 66 percent of the vote and was sworn in by Boehner on December 12, 2013.

2013 Massachusetts's 5th congressional district special election
Party	Candidate	Votes	%
Democratic	Katherine Clark	40,303	65.99
Republican	Frank Addivinola	19,328	31.64
Independent	James Aulenti	996	1.63
Independent	James Hall	452	0.74
Total votes		61,079	100.00
Democratic hold			

== Alabama's 1st congressional district ==
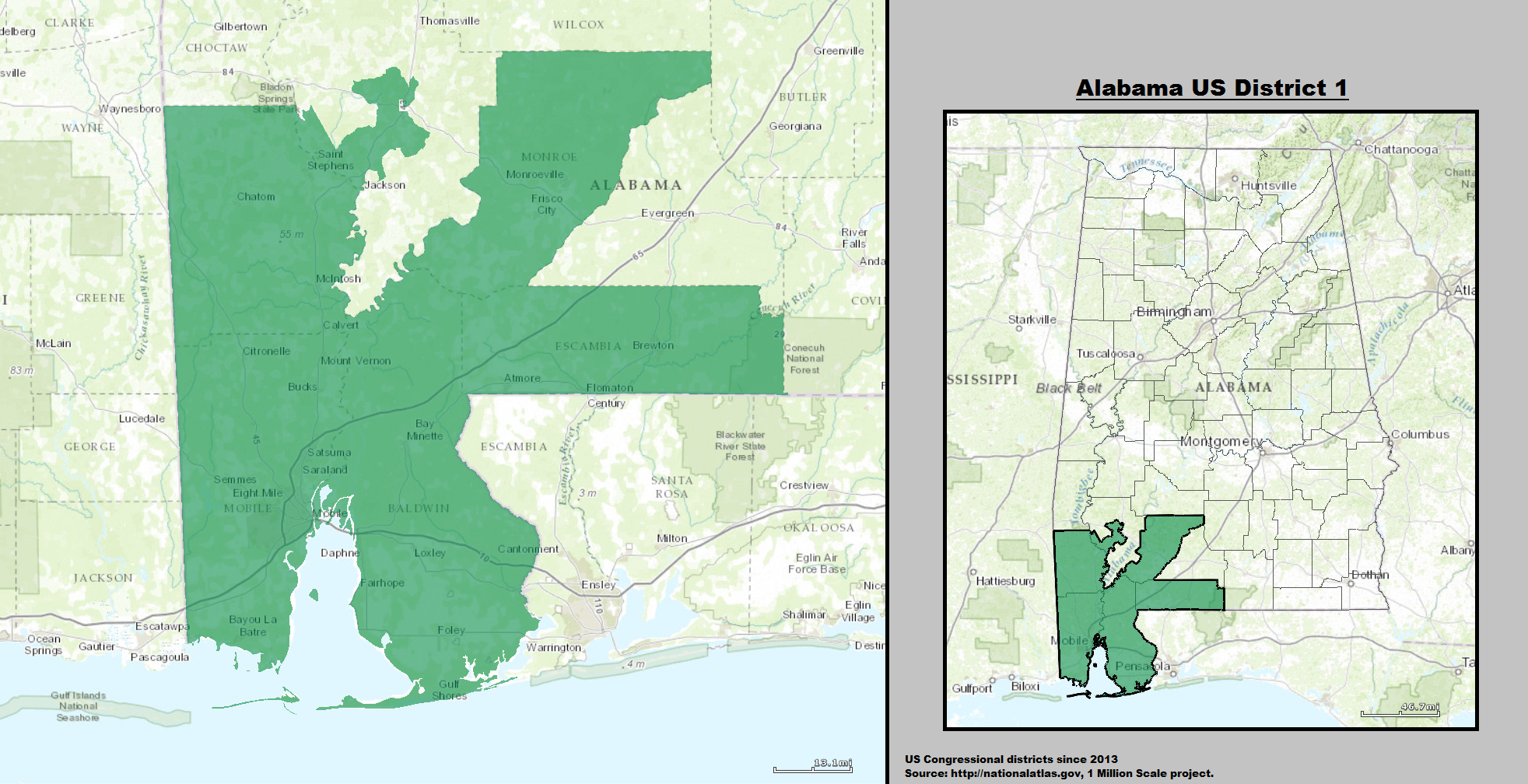
Alabama's 1st congressional district

On May 23, 2013, incumbent Republican Jo Bonner announced his intention to resign from Congress to become the vice chancellor of government relations and economic development with the University of Alabama System., with his resignation becoming effective at midnight on August 15, 2013. This was later moved up to August 2. Alabama Gov. Robert Bentley set the dates for the special election. Primary elections were held on September 24. The Democratic primary was won by Burton LeFlore, a real estate agent, with 70.2% of the vote. On the Republican side, the top two vote-getters in the primary, Bradley Byrne, a former state senator, and Dean Young, a businessman, advanced to a runoff on November 5. Byrne won the runoff, thus becoming his party's nominee. Byrne then went on to win the general election on December 17 by a wide margin.

2013 Alabama's 1st congressional district special election
Party	Candidate	Votes	%
Republican	Bradley Byrne	36,042	70.66
Democratic	Burton LeFlore	14,968	29.34
Total votes		51,010	100.00
Republican hold			

== Louisiana's 5th congressional district ==
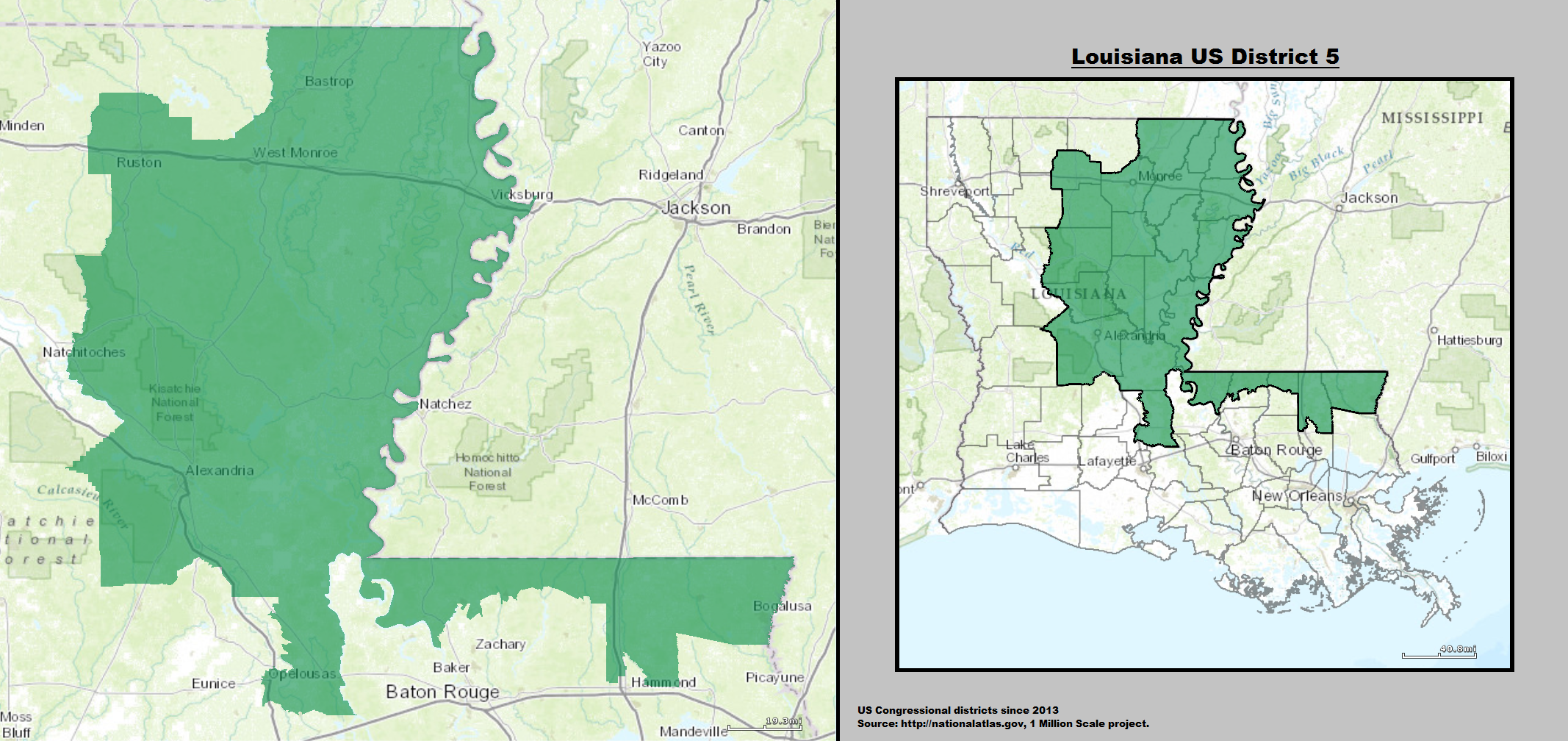
Louisiana's 5th congressional district

On August 6, 2013, six-term incumbent Republican Rodney Alexander announced plans to not seek a 7th term, citing the partisan gridlock in Congress. On August 7, 2013, Alexander announced that he would not serve the remaining time left in his term and would instead resign effective September 26, 2013, and became the Secretary of the Louisiana Department of Veterans Affairs under Governor Bobby Jindal. On August 8, 2013, Jindal issued an executive order setting the dates for the special election with the primary being held on October 19, 2013, and the general election on November 16, 2013. Louisiana operates under a jungle primary where candidates do not run for the nominations of individual parties but all run on one ballot and the top two vote getters advance to the general election.

On October 19, 2013, state senator Neil Riser (with 31.97 percent) and businessman Vance McAllister (with 17.79 percent), both Republicans, advanced to the general election, which was held on November 16.

On November 16, 2013, McAllister defeated Riser in the run-off with 60 percent of the vote, and was sworn in by Boehner on November 21, 2013.

2013 Louisiana's 5th congressional district special election
Party	Candidate	Votes	%
Republican	Vance McAllister	54,450	59.65
Republican	Neil Riser	36,840	40.45
Total votes		91,920	100.00
Republican hold			
