= 2013 Missouri's 8th congressional district special election =

- June 4, 2013

Missouri's 8th congressional district
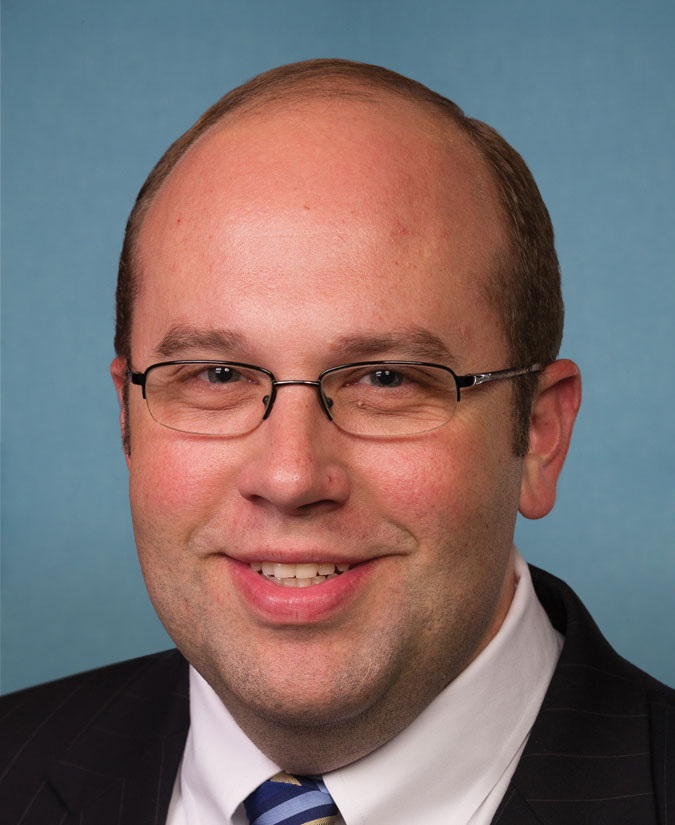

Nominee	Jason Smith	Steve Hodges
Party	Republican	Democratic
Popular vote	42,141	17,207
Percentage	67.14%	27.41%
- County results Smith: 50–60% 60–70% 70–80% 80–90% Hodges: 50–60%
U.S. Representative before election
Jo Ann Emerson
Republican
Elected U.S. Representative
Jason Smith
Republican

A special election for Missouri's 8th congressional district was held on June 4, 2013, following the resignation of Jo Ann Emerson on January 22, 2013, to head the National Rural Electric Cooperative Association. The Republican and Democratic parties selected their own nominees without a primary.

The deadline to request an absentee ballot for the special election was May 29, 2013. A televised candidates' forum took place on May 27, 2013, at Southeast Missouri State University-River Campus; all party candidates participated, while the write-in candidate did not attend. In the general election on June 4, 2013, Republican Jason Smith received 67.1% of the vote, beating Democrat Steve Hodges (27.4%), Constitutional Doug Enyart (3.6%), and Libertarian Bill Slantz (1.5%).

== Candidates ==
=== Republican Party ===
- Jason Smith, speaker pro tem of the Missouri House of Representatives

==== Declared/not selected ====
- Wendell Bailey, former state treasurer of Missouri and U.S. representative
- Dan W. Brown, state senator
- Jason Crowell, former state senator
- Kevin P. Engler, state representative, former state senator, former mayor of Farmington
- Peter Kinder, lieutenant governor of Missouri
- Scott Lipke, former state representative
- Bob Parker, local resident and landowner
- Todd Richardson, state representative
- Lloyd Smith, State Republican Party executive director
- Pedro Sotelo, businessman
- Sarah Steelman, former state treasurer of Missouri
- Clint Tracy, state representative and United States Navy lieutenant commander
- John Tyrrell, attorney
- Wayne Wallingford, state senator, United States Air Force lieutenant colonel and Silver Star recipient

==== Declined ====
- John Jordan, Cape Girardeau County sheriff

=== Democratic Party ===
- Steve Hodges, state representative, District 149

==== Declared/not selected ====
- Todd Mahn, businessman
- Linda Black, state representative
- Jack Rushin, chiropractor and Democratic nominee for the seat in 2012
- Terry Swinger, former state representative

==== Declined ====
- Russ Carnahan, former U.S. representative

=== Libertarian Party ===
- Bill Slantz, businessman

==== Declared/not selected ====
- Jason Williams (withdrew before party meeting)

=== Constitution Party ===
- Doug Enyart, U.S. Marine and professional forester

=== Independent/other ===
- Dr. Robert George (write-in candidate)
- Thomas Brown (write-in candidate)
- Wayne L. Byington (write-in candidate)
- Theo (Ted) Brown, Sr. (write-in candidate)

== General election ==
=== Results ===
2013 Missouri 8th congressional district special election
Party	Candidate	Votes	%
Republican	Jason Smith	42,141	67.14%
Democratic	Steve Hodges	17,207	27.41%
Constitution	Doug Enyart	2,265	3.61%
Libertarian	Bill Slantz	968	1.54%
Write-in		185	0.29%
Total votes		62,766	100.00%
Republican hold			

==== By county ====
County	Jason Smith Republican		Steve Hodges Democratic		Various candidates Other parties		Margin		Total
County	#	%	#	%	#	%	#	%	Total
Bollinger	979	74.6%	229	17.5%	104	7.9%	750	57.1%	1,312
Butler	2,572	75.3%	668	19.6%	175	5.2%	1,904	55.7%	3,415
Cape Girardeau	6,005	70.1%	2,019	23.6%	542	6.3%	3,986	46.5%	8,566
Carter	390	66.6%	147	25.1%	49	8.3%	243	41.5%	586
Crawford	1,276	82.9%	244	15.9%	19	1.2%	1,032	67.0%	1,539
Dent	2,385	86.1%	351	12.7%	33	1.2%	2,034	73.4%	2,769
Douglas	1,011	75.2%	245	18.2%	88	6.5%	766	57.0%	1,344
Dunklin	1,407	67.2%	618	29.5%	68	3.2%	789	37.7%	2,093
Howell	2,268	69.0%	614	18.7%	403	12.3%	1,654	50.3%	3,285
Iron	409	52.4%	339	43.5%	32	4.1%	70	10.9%	780
Jefferson (part)	1,863	57.7%	1,244	38.5%	121	3.7%	619	19.2%	3,228
Madison	608	59.8%	323	31.8%	85	8.4%	285	28.0%	1,016
Mississippi	693	39.2%	1,028	58.2%	46	2.6%	-335	-19.0%	1,767
New Madrid	891	45.8%	1,008	51.9%	45	2.3%	-117	-6.1%	1,944
Oregon	574	59.1%	297	30.6%	101	10.4%	277	28.5%	972
Ozark	639	72.0%	173	19.5%	75	8.5%	466	52.5%	887
Pemiscot	506	58.4%	338	39.0%	23	2.7%	168	19.4%	867
Perry	1,240	72.1%	380	22.1%	100	5.8%	860	50.0%	1,720
Phelps	3,084	74.0%	1,022	24.5%	62	1.5%	2,062	49.5%	4,168
Reynolds	451	65.0%	209	30.1%	34	4.9%	242	34.9%	694
Ripley	744	70.4%	261	24.7%	52	4.9%	483	45.7%	1,057
Scott	2,603	61.4%	1,439	34.0%	195	4.6%	1,164	27.4%	4,237
Shannon	538	59.6%	276	30.6%	88	9.8%	262	29.0%	903
St. Francois	1,850	61.8%	1,001	33.4%	142	4.8%	849	28.4%	2,993
Ste. Genevieve	579	54.7%	451	42.6%	29	2.7%	128	12.1%	1,059
Stoddard	1,968	67.3%	787	26.9%	168	5.8%	1,181	40.4%	2,923
Texas	1,648	71.3%	510	22.1%	153	6.6%	1,138	49.2%	2,311
Washington	732	65.4%	356	31.8%	32	2.9%	376	33.6%	1,120
Wayne	817	56.3%	332	22.9%	301	20.8%	485	33.4%	1,450
Wright	1,412	80.4%	298	17.0%	46	2.6%	1,114	63.4%	1,756
Totals	42,141	67.1%	17,207	27.4%	3,418	5.4%	24,934	39.7%	62,766

== See also ==
- List of special elections to the United States House of Representatives
- Missouri's 8th congressional district
- 2012 House of Representatives election in Missouri 8th district
