= Jason Smith (American politician) =

American politician (born 1980)

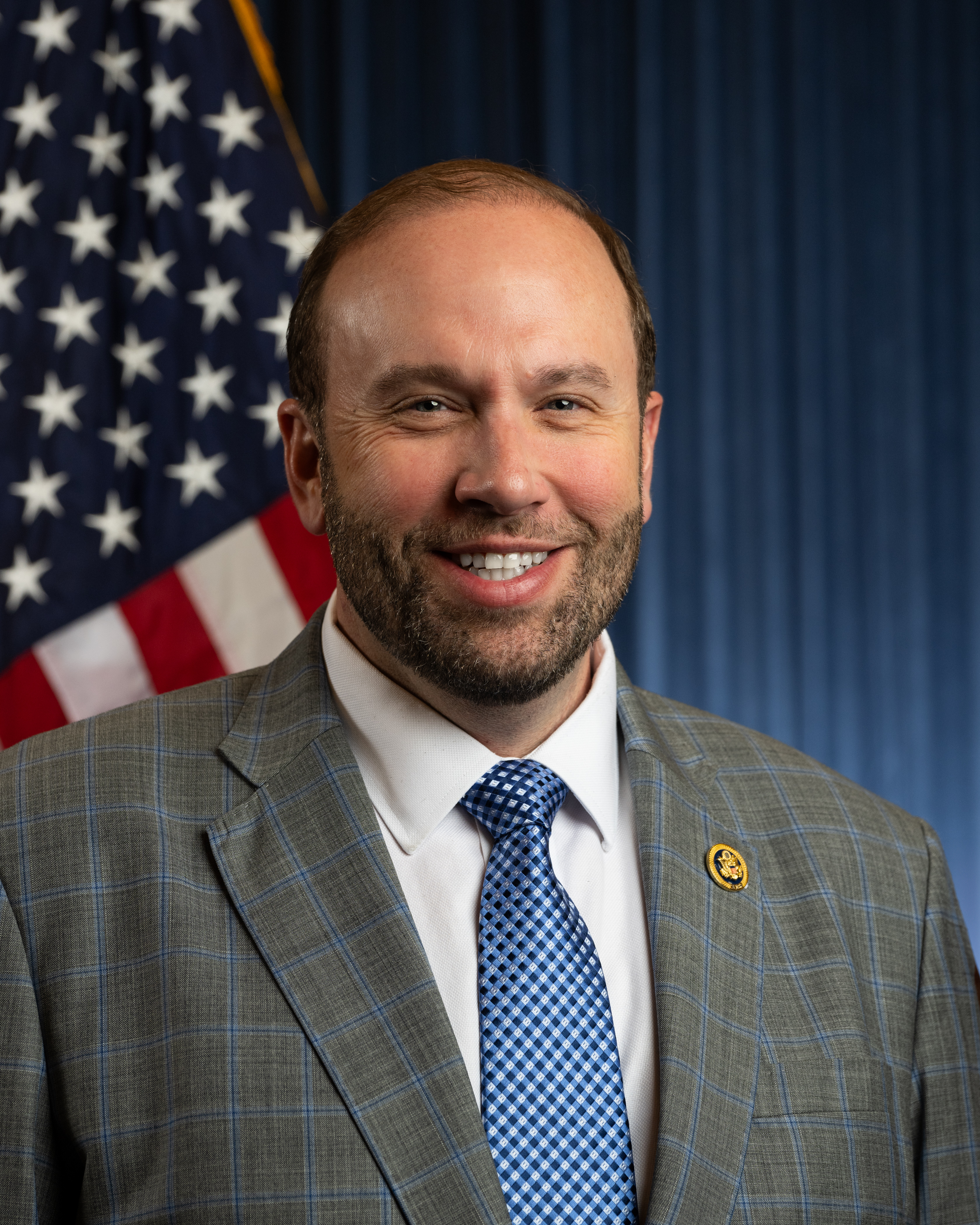
- Official portrait, 2024

Chair of the House Ways and Means Committee
- Incumbent
- Assumed office January 3, 2023
- Preceded by: Richard Neal

Ranking Member of the House Budget Committee
- In office January 3, 2021 – January 3, 2023
- Preceded by: Steve Womack
- Succeeded by: Brendan Boyle

Secretary of the House Republican Conference
- In office January 3, 2017 – January 3, 2021
- Leader: Paul Ryan; Kevin McCarthy
- Preceded by: Virginia Foxx
- Succeeded by: Richard Hudson

Member of the U.S. House of Representatives from Missouri's 8th district
- Incumbent
- Assumed office June 4, 2013 (Note: Smith's official service begins on the date of the special election, while he was not sworn in until June 5, 2013.)
- Preceded by: Jo Ann Emerson

Member of the Missouri House of Representatives
- In office November 14, 2005 – June 4, 2013
- Preceded by: Frank Barnitz
- Succeeded by: Shawn Sisco
- Constituency: 150th district (2005–2013); 120th district (2013)

Personal details
- Born: Jason Thomas Smith; June 16, 1980 (age 46) St. Louis, Missouri, U.S.
- Party: Republican
- Education: University of Missouri (BS); Oklahoma City University (JD)
- Website: House website Campaign website
- Smith's voice Smith supporting the Expanding Seniors Receiving Dialysis Choice Act of 2016. Recorded September 20, 2016

Jason Thomas Smith (born June 16, 1980) is an American businessman and politician who has been the U.S. representative for Missouri's 8th congressional district since 2013. The district comprises 30 counties, covering just under 20,000 square miles of southeastern and southern Missouri.

Before being elected to Congress, Smith served four full terms and one partial term in the Missouri House of Representatives. He was the majority whip during the 96th Missouri General Assembly and as the speaker pro tempore during the 97th Missouri General Assembly.

== Early life, education, and business career ==
Smith was born in St. Louis to Bill, a former minister and auto mechanic, and Mary, a former employee of Briggs & Stratton and a dog breeder. He graduated from Salem High School in 1998.

At age 20, Smith earned two degrees from the University of Missouri: a Bachelor of Science in agriculture economics and a Bachelor of Science in business administration. He attended law school at Oklahoma City University. He is a licensed real estate agent and formed his own small business specializing in property investment and development. He earned his Juris Doctor in 2004.

== Missouri House of Representatives ==
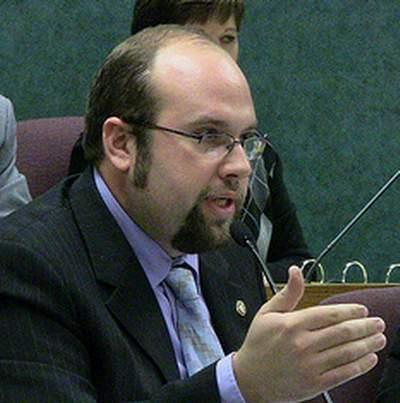
State Representative Jason Smith in 2012

=== Elections ===
==== 2005 special election ====
After state representative Frank Barnitz resigned in 2005, Smith ran for Missouri's 150th House District in a special election. The 150th covered portions of Dent, Phelps, Crawford, and Reynolds counties. Smith defeated Democratic challenger Bobby Simpson 54%–44%.

==== 2006 election ====
One year after being elected to the Missouri House of Representatives in a special election, Smith defeated Democrat Jim O'Donnell 64%–32%.

==== 2008 election ====
In 2008, Smith received 70% of the vote, defeating Democrat James D. Ellis.

==== 2010 election ====
In November 2010, Smith was unopposed in his reelection campaign to his fourth full term to the Missouri House of Representatives. After his reelection, he was elected by his peers to serve as one of the youngest majority whips to serve in the Missouri House of Representatives.

==== 2012 election ====
Smith was again unopposed in his final election to the Missouri House of Representatives in 2012.

=== Tenure ===
At age 25 upon taking office in 2005, Smith became the youngest member of the Missouri House of Representatives. During his first year in office, he served as Majority Assistant Deputy Whip and served on the Agriculture Policy Committee, Appropriations—Education Committee and the Judiciary Committee.

From 2007-2009, Smith served as the vice chair of the Special Committee on Job Creation and Economic Development.

In 2011, Smith sponsored legislation to repeal a 2010-approved referendum, the Puppy Mill Cruelty Prevention Act, regarding oversight of dog breeding businesses requiring "daily feeding, annual veterinary care, increased living spaces and greater access to outdoor exercise". Governor Jay Nixon, a Democrat, signed the repeal into law in 2011.

In 2013, Smith was elected by his peers to serve as the speaker pro tempore.

== U.S. House of Representatives ==
=== Elections ===
2013 special election

Smith ran for the vacant 8th congressional district of Missouri seat after U.S. Representative Jo Ann Emerson resigned to accept a CEO position with the National Rural Electric Cooperative Association.

Per Missouri statute, Smith was selected by the 8th District Republican Central Committee to be the party's nominee in the June special election. The selection process—which began with 27 candidates and narrowed to 13 on nomination day—lasted six total rounds before Smith was the last one standing as the Republican nominee on February 9, 2013. Some of the other candidates included state representative Todd Richardson of Poplar Bluff, former state treasurer of Missouri and U.S. representative Wendell Bailey, former state senator Jason Crowell of Cape Girardeau, Lieutenant Governor Peter Kinder, former state treasurer of Missouri Sarah Steelman, state representative Clint Tracy of Cape Girardeau, and state senator Wayne Wallingford of Cape Girardeau.

In the June special election, Smith was challenged by Democratic state representative Steve Hodges of East Prairie, businessman Doug Enyart of the Constitution Party, and Libertarian Bill Slantz. He was declared the winner of the special election on June 4. The election marked the 47th consecutive U.S. House race in Missouri in which Democrats failed to pick up a Republican-held seat dating back to 1994 – the second longest Democratic pick-up drought in the nation.

2014

After an unopposed primary election on August 5, 2014 and 17 months after the special election, Smith was up for his first reelection on November 4, 2014. He won a five-way race with two-thirds of the vote and carried all 30 counties in the district.

=== Tenure ===
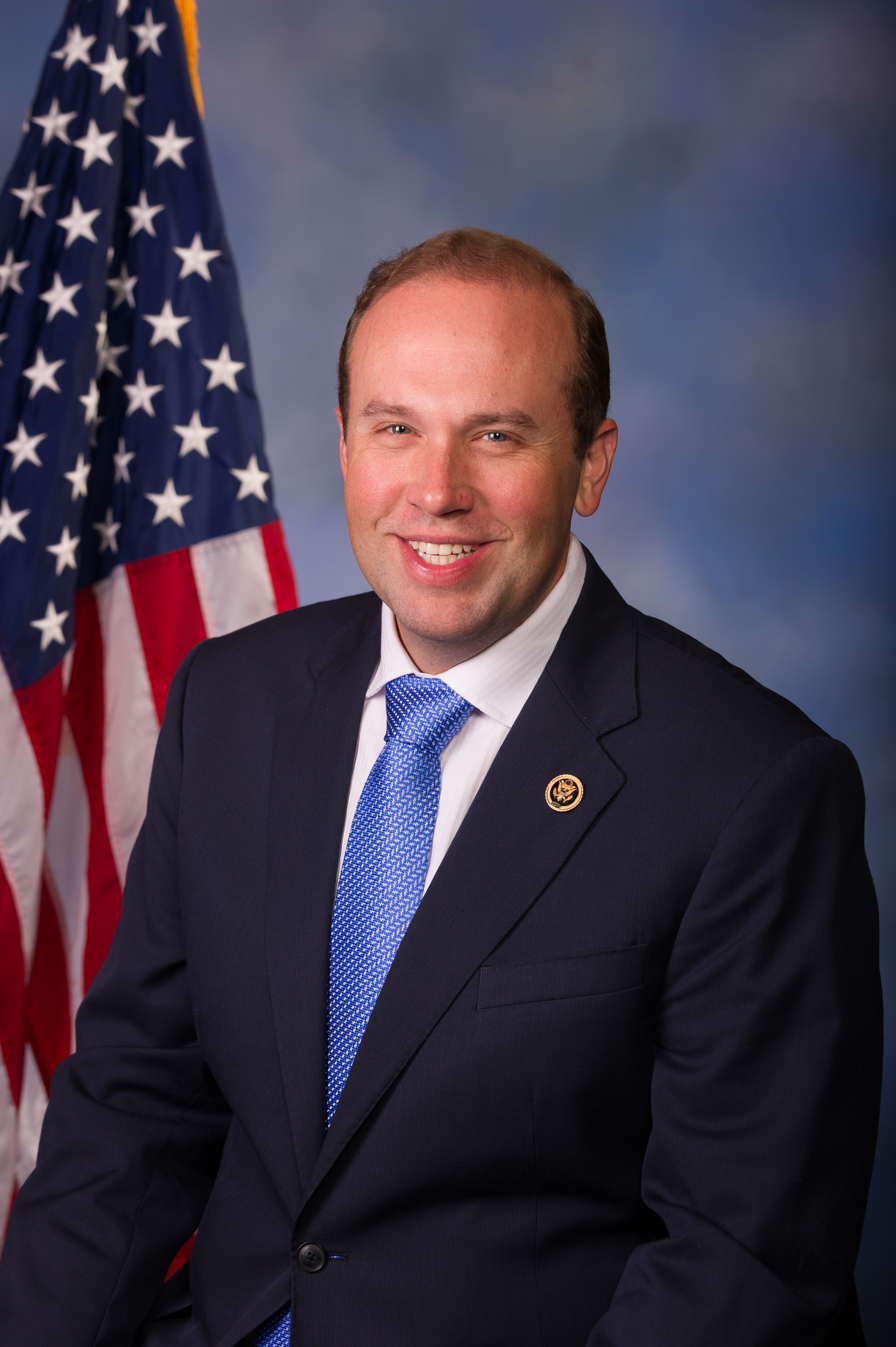
Smith in 2015

In 2015, following the U.S. Supreme Court's ruling in Obergefell v. Hodges, which held that same-sex marriage bans violated the constitution, Smith issued a statement decrying the decision. His statement included "As the son of a preacher, I have never wavered in my commitment to the biblical definition of marriage, and in our state, more than a million Missourians voted to define marriage as between one man and one woman."

On March 8, 2017, Smith, during debate about a tanning salon tax under the Affordable Care Act, wondered aloud, "What I found on Google is roughly 80% of who's taxed is women... Today is International Women's Day. It's interesting no one is bringing that up." He continued, "You look at the number one cause of skin cancer... It's the sun. So I've noticed the people over here haven't found too many taxes they dislike. So why have they not proposed a tax on the sun?"

Smith is a defender of gun rights; on December 6, 2017, he voted for the Concealed Carry Reciprocity Act of 2017, a bill that would allow individuals to cross state line while carrying a gun.

As a member of the House Ways and Means Committee, Smith had a role in writing and passing the Tax Cuts and Jobs Act.

On January 17, 2019, Smith shouted "Go back to Puerto Rico!" at House Democratic members on the House floor while Representative Tony Cardenas was presiding. He later clarified and apologized to Cardenas and stated his remark was in reference to a recent trip taken to Puerto Rico by several lawmakers, including Cardenas, not to single out anyone's ethnicity. His apology was accepted.

Smith was present on the floor of the House chamber during the 2021 storming of the United States Capitol. Smith recalls the events of the attack as rioters began to approach the chamber. As he fled the House chamber, he wore a gas mask and walked passed a woman incapacitated from a gunshot wound. He called the perpetrators' acts as violent, criminal, and unpatriotic.

Smith opposes COVID-19 vaccine mandates, tweeting in July 2021, "The Biden administration wants to knock down your door KGB-style to force people to get vaccinated. We must oppose forced vaccination!"

On February 9, 2022, Smith announced he would seek reelection for a sixth term and pursue the chairmanship of the House Ways and Means Committee, forgoing a run for the United States Senate in the 2022 midterm elections.

Smith proposed legislation to increase penalties for tax returns data leaks, supported by a report on Charles E. Littlejohn authored by his Ways and Means Committee.

In July 2025, Smith expressed support for Donald Trump's calls for more files to be released in investigations of the Jeffrey Epstein client list, saying "the more transparency we can have the better."

=== Committee assignments ===
Current

- Committee on Ways and Means, 114th Congress - present, Chairman
  - As Chair of the Committee, Rep. Smith is entitled to sit as an ex officio member in any subcommittee meetings, per the committee's rules.

Former

- Committee on the Budget, 115th Congress - 117th Congress, Ranking Member, 117th Congress
- Committee on the Judiciary, 113th Congress
- Committee on Natural Resources, 113th Congress

=== Caucus memberships ===
- Congressional Western Caucus
- Republican Study Committee
- U.S.-Japan Caucus
- Congressional Coalition on Adoption
- Rare Disease Caucus

== Electoral history ==
2013 Special Election for U.S. Representative of Missouri's 8th Congressional District
Party	Candidate	Votes	%
Republican	Jason T. Smith	42,141	67.14
Democratic	Steve Hodges	17,207	27.42
Constitution	Doug Enyart	2,265	3.61
Libertarian	Bill Slantz	968	1.54
Write-In	Others	185	0.29

2014 Election for US Representative of Missouri's 8th Congressional District
Party	Candidate	Votes	%
Republican	Jason T. Smith	106,124	66.7
Democratic	Barbara Stocker	60,535	24.7
Independent	Terry Hampton	6,821	4.3
Libertarian	Rick Vandeven	3,759	2.4
Constitution	Doug Enyart	3,799	2.4

2016 Election for US Representative of Missouri's 8th Congressional District
Party	Candidate	Votes	%
Republican	Jason T. Smith	229,792	74.4
Democratic	Dave Cowell	70,009	22.7
Libertarian	Jonathan Lee Shell	9,070	2.9

2018 Election for US Representative of Missouri's 8th Congressional District
Party	Candidate	Votes	%
Republican	Jason T. Smith	180,271	73.7
Democratic	Kathy Ellis	60,535	24.7
Libertarian	Jonathan Lee Shell	3,863	1.6

2020 Election for US Representative of Missouri's 8th Congressional District
Party	Candidate	Votes	%
Republican	Jason T. Smith	253,811	76.9
Democratic	Kathy Ellis	70,561	21.4
Libertarian	Tom Schmitz	5,854	1.8

2022 Election for US Representative of Missouri's 8th Congressional District
Party	Candidate	Votes	%
Republican	Jason T. Smith	186,472	76.0
Democratic	Randi McCallian	53,738	21.9
Libertarian	Jim Higgins	5,185	2.1

2024 Election for US Representative of Missouri's 8th Congressional District
Party	Candidate	Votes	%
Republican	Jason T. Smith (incumbent)	271,249	76.18
Democratic	Randi McCallian	77,649	21.81
Libertarian	Jake Dawson	7,166	2.01
Total votes		356,064	100.0
Republican hold			

== Personal life ==
Smith is unmarried. He is a close friend of former representatives Kristi Noem and Aaron Schock, and Senator Markwayne Mullin.

Smith is a lifetime member of the National Rifle Association of America. He attends Grace Community Church in Salem, an Assemblies of God Church. He was a board member of the Missouri Community Betterment Association, Court Appointed Special Advocates (CASA), and president of the Salem FFA Association.

U.S. House of Representatives
Preceded by Jo Ann Emerson	Member of the U.S. House of Representatives from Missouri's 8th congressional district 2013–present	Incumbent
Preceded by Richard Neal	Chair of the House Ways and Means Committee; 2023–present	Incumbent
Preceded by Ron Wyden	Chair of the Joint Taxation Committee; 2023–2024	Succeeded by Ron Wyden
Preceded by Ron Wyden	Chair of the Joint Taxation Committee; 2025–2026	Succeeded by Mike Crapo
Party political offices
Preceded by Virginia Foxx	Secretary of the House Republican Conference; 2017–2021	Succeeded by Rich Hudson
U.S. order of precedence (ceremonial)
Preceded by Robin Kelly	United States representatives by seniority 120th	Succeeded by Katherine Clark
