= 2018 Missouri Senate election =

Missouri Senate elections, 2018
- November 6, 2018

17 even-numbered districts in the Missouri Senate 18 seats needed for a majority
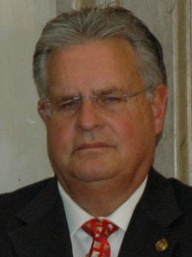

	Majority party	Minority party
Leader	Ron Richard (retired)	Gina Walsh
Party	Republican	Democratic
Leader since	September 15, 2015	July 7, 2016
Leader's seat	32nd district	13th district
Last election	24	10
Seats won	24	10
Seat change	Steady	Steady
Popular vote	710,940	494,965
Percentage	58.59%	40.79%
- Results: Democratic hold Republican hold No election
President pro tempore before election
Ron Richard
Republican
Elected President pro tempore
Dave Schatz
Republican

The 2018 Missouri Senate elections were held on November 6, 2018, to elect the seventeen Missouri Senators to the Missouri Senate. Half of the Senate's thirty-four seats are up for election every two years, with each Senator serving four-year terms. The last time that these seats were up was in 2014; the next time was in 2022.

== Results summary ==
=== Statewide ===
Party	Candi- dates	Votes		Seats		
Party	Candi- dates	No.	%	No.	+/–	%
Republican Party	16	710,940	58.59%	14	Steady	82.35%
Democratic Party	17	494,965	40.79%	3	Steady	17.65%
Libertarian Party	3	5,279	0.44%	0	Steady	0.00%
Green Party	1	2,114	0.17%	0	Steady	0.00%
Write-Ins	1	28	0.00%	0	Steady	0.00%
Total	38	1,213,326	100.00%	17	Steady	100.00%

=== District ===
Results of the 2018 Missouri State Senate elections by district:

District	Republican		Democratic		Others		Total		Result
District	Votes	%	Votes	%	Votes	%	Votes	%	Result
District 2	52,145	59.69%	35,219	40.31%	-	-	87,364	100.00%	Republican Hold
District 4	16,773	22.96%	56,289	77.04%	-	-	73,062	100.00%	Democratic Hold
District 6	52,861	73.22%	17,783	24.63%	1,548	2.15%	72,192	100.00%	Republican Hold
District 8	41,094	54.69%	34,052	45.31%	-	-	75,146	100.00%	Republican Hold
District 10	48,277	70.31%	20,384	29.69%	-	-	68,661	100.00%	Republican Hold
District 12	49,947	72.50%	18,950	27.50%	-	-	68,897	100.00%	Republican Hold
District 14	-	-	51,815	100.00%	-	-	51,815	100.00%	Democratic Hold
District 16	41,985	70.18%	17,839	29.82%	-	-	59,824	100.00%	Republican Hold
District 18	46,225	70.30%	19,528	29.70%	-	-	65,753	100.00%	Republican Hold
District 20	62,247	73.88%	22,006	26.12%	-	-	84,253	100.00%	Republican Hold
District 22	40,553	58.33%	26,896	38.68%	2,077	2.99%	69,526	100.00%	Republican Hold
District 24	30,494	37.15%	49,910	60.80%	1,682	2.05%	82,086	100.00%	Democratic Hold
District 26	53,143	64.02%	29,866	35.98%	-	-	83,009	100.00%	Republican Hold
District 28	53,659	79.18%	14,113	20.82%	-	-	67,772	100.00%	Republican Hold
District 30	34,506	53.35%	30,175	46.65%	-	-	64,681	100.00%	Republican Hold
District 32	48,383	73.73%	15,125	23.05%	2,114	3.22%	65,622	100.00%	Republican Hold
District 34	38,648	52.47%	35,015	47.53%	-	-	73,663	100.00%	Republican Hold
Total	710,940	58.59%	494,965	40.79%	7,421	0.61%	1,213,326	100.00%	

=== Close races ===
Districts where the margin of victory was under 10%:

1. District 8, 9.38%
2. District 30, 6.7%
3. District 34, 4.94%

== Predictions ==
Source	Ranking	As of
Governing	Likely R	October 8, 2018

== District 2 ==
=== Democratic primary ===
==== Primary results ====
Democratic Primary Results
Party	Candidate	Votes	%
Democratic	Patrice Billings	16,711	100.0%
Total votes		16,711	100.0%

=== Republican primary ===
==== Primary results ====
Republican Primary Results
Party	Candidate	Votes	%
Republican	Bob Onder (incumbent)	21,847	100.0%
Total votes		21,847	100.0%

=== General election ===
==== Results ====
Missouri's 2nd State Senate District, 2018
Party	Candidate	Votes	%
Republican	Bob Onder (incumbent)	52,145	59.69%
Democratic	Patrice Billings	35,219	40.31%
Margin of victory		16,926	19.38%
Total votes		87,364	100.0%
Republican hold			

== District 4 ==
=== Democratic primary ===
==== Primary results ====
Democratic Primary Results
Party	Candidate	Votes	%
Democratic	Karla May	20,303	57.20%
Democratic	Jacob Hummel (incumbent)	15,189	42.80%
Margin of victory		5,114	14.40%
Total votes		35,492	100.0%

=== Republican primary ===
==== Primary results ====
Republican Primary Results
Party	Candidate	Votes	%
Republican	Robert J. Crump	4,743	100.0%
Total votes		4,743	100.0%

=== General election ===
==== Results ====
Missouri's 4th State Senate District, 2018
Party	Candidate	Votes	%
Democratic	Karla May	56,289	77.04%
Republican	Robert J. Crump	16,773	22.96%
Margin of victory		39,516	54.08%
Total votes		73,062	100.0%
Democratic hold			

== District 6 ==
=== Democratic primary ===
==== Primary results ====
Democratic Primary Results
Party	Candidate	Votes	%
Democratic	Nicole Thompson	4,746	55.84%
Democratic	Bryan Struebig	1,938	22.80%
Democratic	Mollie Kristen Freebairn	1,815	21.36%
Margin of victory		2,808	33.04%
Total votes		8,499	100.0%

=== Republican primary ===
==== Primary results ====
Republican Primary Results
Party	Candidate	Votes	%
Republican	Mike Bernskoetter	27,708	100.0%
Total votes		27,708	100.0%

=== Libertarian primary ===
==== Primary results ====
Libertarian Primary Results
Party	Candidate	Votes	%
Libertarian	Steve Wilson	104	100.0%
Total votes		104	100.0%

=== General election ===
==== Results ====
Missouri's 6th State Senate District, 2018
Party	Candidate	Votes	%
Republican	Mike Bernskoetter	52,861	73.22%
Democratic	Nicole Thompson	17,783	24.63%
Libertarian	Steven Wilson	1,520	2.11%
N/A	Write-Ins	28	0.04%
Margin of victory		35,078	48.59%
Total votes		72,192	100.0%
Republican hold			

== District 8 ==
=== Democratic primary ===
==== Primary results ====
Democratic Primary Results
Party	Candidate	Votes	%
Democratic	Hillary Shields	16,089	100.0%
Total votes		16,089	100.0%

=== Republican primary ===
==== Primary results ====
Republican Primary Results
Party	Candidate	Votes	%
Republican	Mike Cierpiot (incumbent)	16,836	89.02%
Republican	Leonard Jonas Hughes IV	2,076	10.98%
Margin of victory		14,760	78.04%
Total votes		18,912	100.0%

=== General election ===
==== Polling ====
Poll source	Date(s) administered	Sample size (Note: Key: A – all adults RV – registered voters LV – likely voters V – unclear)	Margin of error	Mike Cierpiot (R)	Hillary Shields (D)	Undecided
Remington Research Group (R) (Note: Poll sponsored by the Missouri Scout)	September 12–13, 2018	702 (LV)	± 3.8%	54%	35%	11%

==== Results ====
Missouri's 8th State Senate District, 2018
Party	Candidate	Votes	%
Republican	Mike Cierpiot (incumbent)	41,094	54.69%
Democratic	Hillary Shields	34,052	45.31%
Margin of victory		7,042	9.38%
Total votes		75,146	100.0%
Republican hold			

== District 10 ==
=== Democratic primary ===
==== Primary results ====
Democratic Primary Results
Party	Candidate	Votes	%
Democratic	Ayanna Shivers	10,462	100.0%
Total votes		10,462	100.0%

=== Republican primary ===
==== Primary results ====
Republican Primary Results
Party	Candidate	Votes	%
Republican	Jeanie Riddle (incumbent)	26,446	100.0%
Total votes		26,446	100.0%

=== General election ===
==== Results ====
Missouri's 10th State Senate District, 2018
Party	Candidate	Votes	%
Republican	Jeanie Riddle (incumbent)	48,277	70.31%
Democratic	Ayanna Shivers	20,384	29.69%
Margin of victory		27,893	40.62%
Total votes		68,661	100.0%
Republican hold			

== District 12 ==
=== Democratic primary ===
==== Primary results ====
Democratic Primary Results
Party	Candidate	Votes	%
Democratic	Terry Richard	8,924	100.0%
Total votes		8,924	100.0%

=== Republican primary ===
==== Primary results ====
Republican Primary Results
Party	Candidate	Votes	%
Republican	Dan Hegeman	23,784	100.0%
Total votes		23,784	100.0%

=== General election ===
==== Results ====
Missouri's 12th State Senate District, 2018
Party	Candidate	Votes	%
Republican	Dan Hegeman (incumbent)	49,947	72.50%
Democratic	Terry Richard	18,950	27.50%
Margin of victory		30,997	45.00%
Total votes		68,897	100.0%
Republican hold			

== District 14 ==
=== Democratic primary ===
==== Primary results ====
Democratic Primary Results
Party	Candidate	Votes	%
Democratic	Brian Williams	12,615	40.19%
Democratic	Sharon L. Pace	11,782	37.53%
Democratic	Joe Adams	6,993	22.28%
Margin of victory		833	2.66%
Total votes		31,390	100.0%

=== General election ===
==== Results ====
Missouri's 14th State Senate District, 2018
Party	Candidate	Votes	%
Democratic	Brian Williams	51,815	100.0%
Total votes		51,815	100.0%
Democratic hold			

== District 16 ==
=== Democratic primary ===
==== Primary results ====
Democratic Primary Results
Party	Candidate	Votes	%
Democratic	Ryan Dillon	6,017	100.0%
Total votes		6,017	100.0%

=== Republican primary ===
==== Primary results ====
Republican Primary Results
Party	Candidate	Votes	%
Republican	Justin Dan Brown (incumbent)	10,535	40.06%
Republican	Diane Franklin	9,262	35.22%
Republican	Keith Frederick	6,500	24.72%
Total votes		26,297	100.0%

=== General election ===
==== Polling ====
Poll source	Date(s) administered	Sample size	Margin of error	Justin Dan Brown (R)	Ryan Dillon (D)	Undecided
Remington Research Group (R)	September 19–20, 2018	815 (LV)	± 3.4%	54%	35%	11%

==== Results ====
Missouri's 16th State Senate District, 2018
Party	Candidate	Votes	%
Republican	Justin Dan Brown (incumbent)	41,985	70.18%
Democratic	Ryan Dillon	17,839	29.82%
Margin of victory		24,146	40.36%
Total votes		59,824	100.0%
Republican hold			

== District 18 ==
=== Democratic primary ===
==== Primary results ====
Democratic Primary Results
Party	Candidate	Votes	%
Democratic	Crystal Stephens	9,733	100.0%
Total votes		9,733	100.0%

=== Republican primary ===
==== Primary results ====
Republican Primary Results
Party	Candidate	Votes	%
Republican	Cindy O'Laughlin	9,893	36.70%
Republican	Craig Redmon	7,236	26.84%
Republican	Nate Walker	5,340	19.81%
Republican	Lindell F. Shumake	4,489	16.65%
Margin of victory		2,657	9.86%
Total votes		26,958	100.0%

=== General election ===
==== Results ====
Missouri's 18th State Senate District, 2018
Party	Candidate	Votes	%
Republican	Cindy O'Laughlin	46,225	70.30%
Democratic	Crystal Stephens	19,528	29.70%
Margin of victory		26,697	40.60%
Total votes		65,753	100.0%
Republican hold			

== District 20 ==
=== Democratic primary ===
==== Primary results ====
Democratic Primary Results
Party	Candidate	Votes	%
Democratic	Jim Billedo	7,909	100.0%
Total votes		7,909	100.0%

=== Republican primary ===
==== Primary results ====
Republican Primary Results
Party	Candidate	Votes	%
Republican	Eric W. Burlison	25,059	100.0%
Total votes		25,059	100.0%

=== General election ===
==== Results ====
Missouri's 20th State Senate District, 2018
Party	Candidate	Votes	%
Republican	Eric W. Burlison	62,247	73.88%
Democratic	Jim Billedo	22,006	26.12%
Margin of victory		40,241	47.76%
Total votes		84,253	100.0%
Republican hold			

== District 22 ==
=== Democratic primary ===
==== Primary results ====
Democratic Primary Results
Party	Candidate	Votes	%
Democratic	Robert Butler	10,706	66.95%
Democratic	Edward Thurman	5,286	33.05%
Margin of victory		5,420	33.90%
Total votes		15,992	100.0%

=== Republican primary ===
==== Primary results ====
Republican Primary Results
Party	Candidate	Votes	%
Republican	Paul Wieland (incumbent)	18,378	100.0%
Total votes		18,378	100.0%

=== Libertarian primary ===
==== Primary results ====
Libertarian Primary Results
Party	Candidate	Votes	%
Libertarian	Richie Camden	309	100.0%
Total votes		309	100.0%

=== General election ===
==== Polling ====
Poll source	Date(s) administered	Sample size	Margin of error	Paul Wieland (R)	Robert Butler (D)	Richie Camden (L)	Undecided
Remington Research Group (R)	October 10–11, 2018	460 (LV)	± 4.7%	48%	38%	4%	10%

==== Results ====
Missouri's 22nd State Senate District, 2018
Party	Candidate	Votes	%
Republican	Paul Wieland (incumbent)	40,553	58.33%
Democratic	Robert Butler	26,896	38.68%
Libertarian	Richie Camden	2,077	2.99%
Margin of victory		11,580	19.65%
Total votes		69,526	100.0%
Republican hold			

== District 24 ==
=== Democratic primary ===
==== Primary results ====
Democratic Primary Results
Party	Candidate	Votes	%
Democratic	Jill Schupp (incumbent)	27,548	100.0%
Total votes		27,548	100.0%

=== Republican primary ===
==== Primary results ====
Republican Primary Results
Party	Candidate	Votes	%
Republican	Gregory B. Powers	11,229	100.0%
Total votes		11,229	100.0%

=== Libertarian primary ===
==== Primary results ====
Libertarian Primary Results
Party	Candidate	Votes	%
Libertarian	Jim Higgins	225	100.0%
Total votes		225	100.0%

=== General election ===
==== Results ====
Missouri's 24th State Senate District, 2018
Party	Candidate	Votes	%
Democratic	Jill Schupp (incumbent)	49,910	60.80%
Republican	Gregory B. Powers	30,494	37.15%
Libertarian	Jim Higgins	1,682	2.05%
Margin of victory		19,416	23.65%
Total votes		82,086	100.0%
Democratic hold			

== District 26 ==
=== Democratic primary ===
==== Primary results ====
Democratic Primary Results
Party	Candidate	Votes	%
Democratic	John Kiehne	13,950	100.0%
Total votes		13,950	100.0%

=== Republican primary ===
==== Primary results ====
Republican Primary Results
Party	Candidate	Votes	%
Republican	Dave Schatz (incumbent)	24,992	100.0%
Total votes		24,992	100.0%

=== General election ===
==== Results ====
Missouri's 26th State Senate District, 2018
Party	Candidate	Votes	%
Republican	Dave Schatz (incumbent)	53,143	64.02%
Democratic	John Kiehne	29,866	35.98%
Margin of victory		23,277	28.04%
Total votes		83,009	100.0%
Republican hold			

== District 28 ==
=== Democratic primary ===
==== Primary results ====
Democratic Primary Results
Party	Candidate	Votes	%
Democratic	Joe Poor	6,590	100.0%
Total votes		6,590	100.0%

=== Republican primary ===
==== Primary results ====
Republican Primary Results
Party	Candidate	Votes	%
Republican	Sandy Crawford (incumbent)	26,245	100.0%
Total votes		26,245	100.0%

=== General election ===
==== Results ====
Missouri's 28th State Senate District, 2018
Party	Candidate	Votes	%
Republican	Sandy Crawford (incumbent)	53,659	79.18%
Democratic	Joe Poor	14,113	20.82%
Margin of victory		39,546	58.36%
Total votes		67,772	100.0%
Republican hold			

== District 30 ==
=== Democratic primary ===
==== Primary results ====
Democratic Primary Results
Party	Candidate	Votes	%
Democratic	Charlie Norr	12,552	100.0%
Total votes		12,552	100.0%

=== Republican primary ===
==== Primary results ====
Republican Primary Results
Party	Candidate	Votes	%
Republican	Lincoln Hough	15,952	100.0%
Total votes		15,952	100.0%

=== General election ===
==== Polling ====
Poll source	Date(s) administered	Sample size	Margin of error	Tony Luetkemeyer (R)	Martin Rucker (D)	Undecided
Remington Research Group (R)	September 5–6, 2018	735 (LV)	± 3.6%	48%	42%	10%

==== Results ====
Missouri's 30th State Senate District, 2018
Party	Candidate	Votes	%
Republican	Lincoln Hough	34,506	53.35%
Democratic	Charlie Norr	30,175	46.65%
Margin of victory		4,331	6.70%
Total votes		64,681	100.0%
Republican hold			

== District 32 ==
=== Democratic primary ===
==== Primary results ====
Democratic Primary Results
Party	Candidate	Votes	%
Democratic	Carolyn McGowan	5,119	100.0%
Total votes		5,119	100.0%

=== Republican primary ===
==== Primary results ====
Republican Primary Results
Party	Candidate	Votes	%
Republican	Bill White	17,478	64.16%
Republican	Rob O'Brian	9,765	35.84%
Margin of victory		7,713	28.32%
Total votes		27,243	100.0%

=== Green primary ===
==== Primary results ====
Green Primary Results
Party	Candidate	Votes	%
Green	Conon Gillis	85	100.0%
Total votes		85	100.0%

=== General election ===
==== Results ====
Missouri's 32nd State Senate District, 2018
Party	Candidate	Votes	%
Republican	Bill White	48,383	73.73%
Democratic	Carolyn McGowan	15,125	23.05%
Green	Conon Gillis	2,114	3.22%
Margin of victory		33,258	50.68%
Total votes		65,622	100.0%
Republican hold			

== District 34 ==
=== Democratic primary ===
==== Primary results ====
Democratic Primary Results
Party	Candidate	Votes	%
Democratic	Martin T. Rucker II	15,033	100.0%
Total votes		15,033	100.0%

=== Republican primary ===
==== Primary results ====
Republican Primary Results
Party	Candidate	Votes	%
Republican	Tony Luetkemeyer	11,679	53.67%
Republican	Harry Roberts	10,083	46.33%
Margin of victory		1,596	7.34%
Total votes		21,762	100.0%

=== General election ===
==== Polling ====
Poll source	Date(s) administered	Sample size	Margin of error	Tony Luetkemeyer (R)	Martin Rucker (D)	Undecided
Remington Research Group (R)	October 3–4, 2018	480 (LV)	± 4.6%	49%	44%	7%

==== Results ====
Missouri's 34th State Senate District, 2018
Party	Candidate	Votes	%
Republican	Tony Luetkemeyer	38,648	52.47%
Democratic	Martin T. Rucker II	35,015	47.53%
Margin of victory		3,633	4.94%
Total votes		73,663	100.0%
Republican hold			

== See also ==
- 2018 United States Senate election in Missouri

== Notes ==
Partisan clients
