= Onstott =

Onstott is a surname. People with the surname include:

- Kevin Onstott, American politician
- Kyle Onstott (1887 – 1966), American novelist
- Tullis Onstott (1955–2021), American geologist

== See also ==
- Stott
