= Lybyer =

Lybyer is a surname. Notable people with the surname include:

- Albert Howe Lybyer (1876–1949), American scholar of the history of the Middle East and the Balkans
- Michael Lybyer (born 1947), American politician
