= Senator Barnitz =

Senator Barnitz may refer to:

- Charles Augustus Barnitz (1780–1850), Pennsylvania State Senate
- Frank Barnitz (born 1968), Missouri State Senate
