= Donald Aldridge =

Donald Aldridge may refer to:

- Donald O. Aldridge (born 1932), United States Air Force general
- Donald R. Aldridge (born 1937), member of the Arizona House of Representatives
