= Suzie Pollock =

American politician

Member of the Missouri House of Representatives from the 123rd district
- In office 2019–2023
- Preceded by: Diane Franklin
- Succeeded by: Lisa Thomas (redistricting)

Personal details
- Born: Michigan, U.S.
- Party: Republican
- Spouse: Darrell Pollock
- Children: 2
- Education: Elizabethtown Community and Technical College (AA); Spencerian College (GrCert)

Suzie Pollock is an American politician who served as a member of the Missouri House of Representatives from the 123rd district. A member of the Republican Party, she was elected in 2018 and assumed office in 2019.

== Early life and education ==
Pollock was born in Michigan and raised in Kentucky. She earned an associate degree from Elizabethtown Community and Technical College and a certificate from Spencerian College.

== Career ==
Pollock is a cardiovascular invasive specialist. She was elected to the Missouri House of Representatives in 2018 and re-elected in 2020.

=== Anti-vaccine activity ===
While in the House, Pollock promoted anti-vaccination legislation. During the COVID-19 pandemic in Missouri, Pollock was one of a number of Republican state lawmakers who promoted and amplified misinformation about COVID-19 and the COVID-19 vaccine. She promoted claims, promoted by right-wing media outlets, that the vaccines approved for use in the U.S. had "been rushed" and had questionable efficacy. In late 2020, Pollock introduced a bill to bar discrimination against persons who chose not to be vaccination against COVID-19.

In the 2021 legislative session, Pollock sponsored a measure to expand school vaccination opt-outs, allowing more children to enter school without being vaccinated against infectious diseases, such as polio, measles, and mumps. Pollock had introduced a similar bill in 2020, but it did not advance. Pollock's bill would have eliminated vaccine requirements for private school students, and would also make it easier to obtain exemptions from vaccine requirements to attend public schools and universities. During the legislative debate, Pollock said, "We need to rein in our schools and our health departments." The Missouri State Medical Association and the Missouri chapter of the American Academy of Pediatrics opposed the bill due to the supposed risks it presented to public health. The House Elementary and Secondary Education Committee passed the bill 10–6, but it was defeated in April 2021 on the House floor on a 79–67 vote.

== Personal life ==
Pollock's husband, Darrell Pollock, served in the Missouri House of Representatives from 2005 to 2013. Pollock and her husband live in Lebanon, Missouri and have two children. They also have 9 great- nieces and nephews 6 nieces Amaiya, Alivia, Kaylee, Stella, and Lilly. Their nephew's names are Matthew, Houston, and Stetson.
