= 2004 Missouri State Treasurer election =

- November 2, 2004
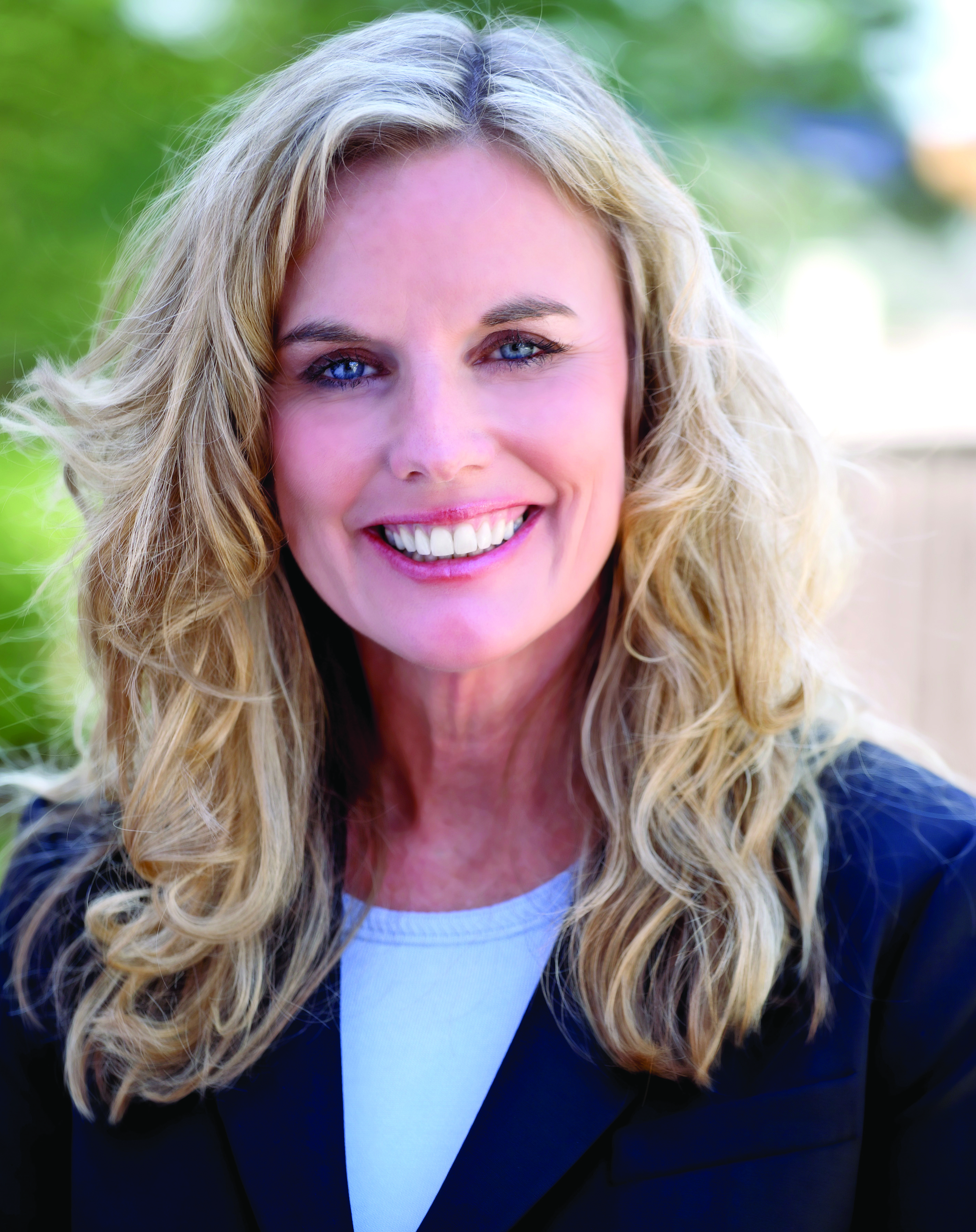

Nominee	Sarah Steelman	Mark Powell
Party	Republican	Democratic
Popular vote	1,342,049	1,213,769
Percentage	50.97%	46.10%
- County results Steelman: 40–50% 50–60% 60–70% 70–80% 80–90% Powell: 40–50% 50–60% 70–80%
State Treasurer before election
Nancy Farmer
Democratic
Elected State Treasurer
Sarah Steelman
Republican

The 2004 Missouri State Treasurer election was held on November 2, 2004, in order to elect the state treasurer of Missouri. Republican nominee and incumbent member of the Missouri Senate Sarah Steelman defeated Democratic nominee Mark Powell, Libertarian nominee Lisa J. Emerson and Constitution nominee Chris Fluharty.

== General election ==
On election day, November 2, 2004, Republican nominee Sarah Steelman won the election by a margin of 128,280 votes against her foremost opponent Democratic nominee Mark Powell, thereby gaining Republican control over the office of state treasurer. Steelman was sworn in as the 44th state treasurer of Missouri on January 10, 2005.

=== Results ===
Missouri State Treasurer election, 2004
Party	Candidate	Votes	%
Republican	Sarah Steelman	1,342,049	50.97
Democratic	Mark Powell	1,213,769	46.10
Libertarian	Lisa J. Emerson	59,605	2.26
Constitution	Chris Fluharty	17,389	0.67
Total votes		2,632,812	100.00
Republican gain from Democratic			

== See also ==
- 2004 Missouri gubernatorial election
