= Donna Lichtenegger =

American politician

Member of the Missouri House of Representatives from the 146th district
- In office 2011–2019
- Preceded by: Darrell Pollock
- Succeeded by: Barry Hovis

Personal details
- Born: July 26, 1956 (age 69) St. Louis, Missouri
- Party: Republican
- Spouse: John
- Children: two
- Profession: Dental Hygienist

Donna Lichtenegger (born July 26, 1956) is an American politician. She was a member of the Missouri House of Representatives from 2011 to 2019. She is a member of the Republican party.
