= Donald O. Aldridge =

United States Air Force general (1932–2025)

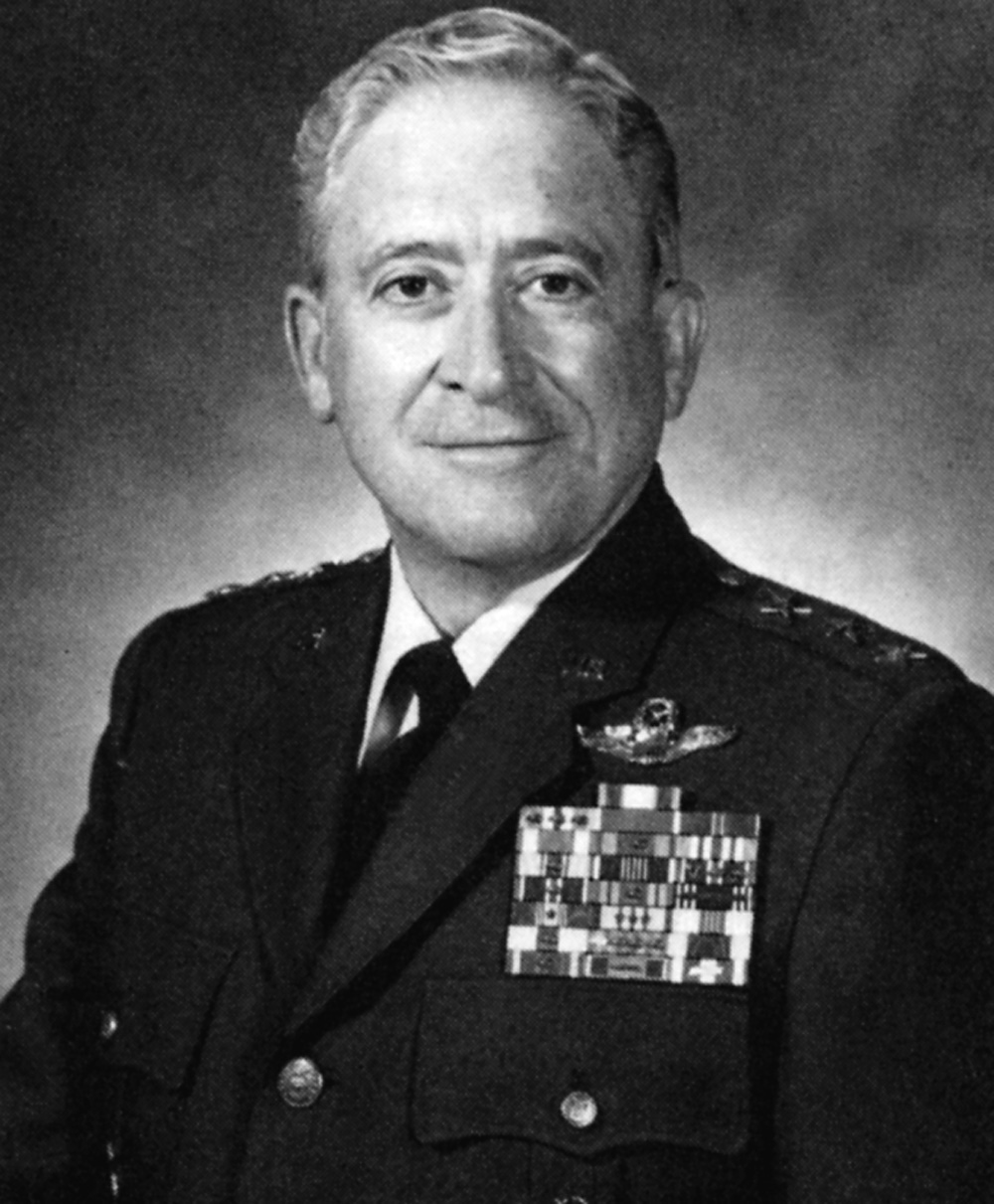
- Born: July 22, 1932; Solo, Missouri, U.S.
- Died: November 27, 2025 (aged 93); Colorado Springs, Colorado, U.S.
- Military career
- Allegiance: United States of America
- Branch: United States Air Force
- Service years: 1951–1991
- Rank: Lieutenant general
- Commands: Vice Commander-in-Chief, Strategic Air Command
- Awards: Air Force Distinguished Service Medal, Defense Superior Service Medal with three oak leaf clusters, Legion of Merit, Bronze Star Medal, others below

Donald O'Neal Aldridge (July 22, 1932 – November 27, 2025) was a lieutenant general in the United States Air Force.

== Background ==
Aldridge was born in Solo, Missouri, on July 22, 1932. He graduated from the University of Nebraska and Creighton University.

== Career ==
Aldridge originally enlisted in the Air Force in 1951. He then began training to become a Russian linguist. In 1958, he was commissioned as an officer.

He began flight training at Moore Air Base and Greenville Air Force Base. Afterwards, he flew Boeing B-47 Stratojets with the 44th Bombardment Wing at Chennault Air Force Base.

Aldridge later became a Boeing B-52 Stratofortress pilot with the 17th Bombardment Wing at Wright-Patterson Air Force Base. During this time, he also completed Squadron Officer School. Afterwards, he was assigned to the 93d Bombardment Wing at Castle Air Force Base as an instructor pilot. In 1968, Aldridge was deployed to serve in the Vietnam War, stationed at Kadena Air Base. The following year, he returned to Castle Air Force Base.

In 1972, Aldridge graduated from the Air Command and Staff College and was assigned to the 43d Strategic Wing at Andersen Air Force Base. Later that year, he took part in Operation Linebacker II. In 1973, he became executive officer of the 43d Strategic Wing and the 72d Bombardment Wing.

After being stationed at Offutt Air Force Base, Aldridge graduated from the National War College in 1977. He was then assigned to the Office of the Deputy Chief of Staff, Plans and Operations of the Air Force. From 1979 to 1980, he was assigned to the Office of the Joint Chiefs of Staff. Aldridge later transferred to the Defense Mapping Agency, eventually become the agency's deputy director.

In 1981, Aldridge became the U.S. representative to the Military Committee at the headquarters of NATO. Afterwards, he served as a representative of the Joint Chiefs of Staff on multiple occasions. In 1986, he assumed command of the 1st Strategic Aerospace Division at Vandenberg Air Force Base. Aldridge became Vice Commander in Chief of Strategic Air Command in 1988 before retiring 1991.

Awards he received during his career include the Air Force Distinguished Service Medal, the Defense Superior Service Medal with three oak leaf clusters, the Legion of Merit, the Bronze Star Medal, the Meritorious Service Medal, the Air Medal with oak leaf cluster, the Joint Service Commendation Medal, the Air Force Commendation Medal with oak leaf cluster and the Army Commendation Medal.

== Death ==
Aldridge died from complications of Parkinson's disease in Colorado Springs, Colorado, on November 27, 2025, at the age of 93.
