= Justin Brown (politician) =

American politician

Member of the Missouri Senate from the 16th district
- Incumbent
- Assumed office January 9, 2019
- Preceded by: Dan W. Brown

Personal details
- Party: Republican
- Education: University of Missouri-Rolla (BA)
- Profession: Farmer

Justin Brown is an American politician who is a member of the Missouri Senate from the 16th district, serving since 2019. He is a member of the Republican party.

== Education and career ==
Brown was born and raised in Phelps County, Missouri. Brown attended the University of Missouri-Rolla (now Missouri University of Science and Technology), where he graduated with a degree in history. After graduation, he worked in agricultural financing as a commercial loan officer. Brown now works as a farmer, raising corn and soybeans on more than 2,200 acres and maintaining a calf-cow operation. He is a member of the Missouri Cattleman's Association and has served on the boards of the Missouri Beef Council and the Phelps County Farm Bureau.

== State Senate ==
2018

When his father, incumbent Dan W. Brown, was forced to leave office after being term-limited, Brown became a candidate for his seat in District 16. He ran against two candidates — Diane Franklin and Keith Frederick — in the Republican primary. Brown won with 40.1% of the vote. In the general election, he defeated Democrat Ryan Dillon to win by over 40%, or 24,285 votes.

=== Committee assignments ===
- Agriculture, Food Production and Outdoor Resources
- Appropriations
- Government Reform
- Transportation, Infrastructure, and Public Safety
- Veterans Affairs and Mililtary Affairs (Vice-Chairman)
- Transportation Oversight
- Disaster Preparedness and Awareness

== Election history ==
Missouri Senate Primary Election, August 7, 2018, District 16
Party	Candidate	Votes	%	±%
Republican	Justin Brown	10,535	40.1%	
Republican	Diane Franklin	9,262	35.2%	
Republican	Keith Frederick	6,500	24.7%	

Missouri Senate Election, November 6, 2018, District 16
Party	Candidate	Votes	%	±%
Republican	Justin Brown	42,382	70.1%	
Democratic	Ryan Dillon	18,097	29.9%	

Missouri Senate Election, November 8, 2022, District 16
Party	Candidate	Votes	%	±%
Republican	Justin Brown	39,087	80.7%	+10.6
Democratic	Tara Anura	9,363	19.3%	−10.6
Total votes		48,450	100	
