= Darrell Pollock =

American politician and businessman

Member of the Missouri House of Representatives for the 146th district
- In office 2005–2012
- Succeeded by: Donna Lichtenegger

Personal details
- Born: July 23, 1961 (age 65)
- Party: Republican
- Spouse: Suzie Pollock
- Children: 2
- Education: University of Central Missouri

Darrell Pollock (born July 23, 1961) is an American politician and businessman who served as a member of the Missouri House of Representatives for the 146th district from 2005 to 2012.

== Background ==
Pollock attended the University of Central Missouri. Elected in 2004, he assumed office in 2005. Pollock also owns and operates a small business. Pollock's wife, Suzie Pollock, was elected to the Missouri House in 2018. They have two children and live in Lebanon, Missouri.
