= Michael Lybyer =

American politician

Michael J. "Mike" Lybyer (born February 23, 1947) is a former American Democratic politician who served in the Missouri Senate and the Missouri House of Representatives from 1977 until 1979. In 1998, he was defeated in reelection by future state treasurer Sarah Steelman

Born in Waynesville, Missouri, Lybyer graduated from the Houston, Missouri, public school system. He graduated from the University of Missouri in 1969 with a bachelor's degree in agriculture. Lybyer worked as a beef cattle farmer in Texas County, Missouri, and also served in the U.S. Army Reserves for six years.
