= Solo, Missouri =

Unincorporated community in Missouri, U.S.

Coordinates: 37°14′00″N 91°57′12″W

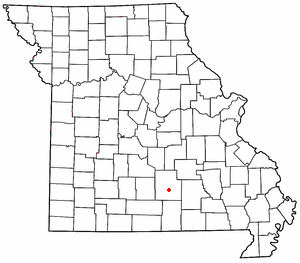

Solo is an unincorporated community in Texas County, Missouri, United States. It is located approximately six miles south of Houston. Solo is reached via Missouri Route UU from U.S. Route 63 and is on the west side of Hog Creek.

== History ==
A post office in Solo was established in 1884, but is closed now. Post offices in Elk Creek and Houston serve the area today. The community was so named on account of its rural location. Dan W. Brown (1950–2021), Missouri state legislator and veterinarian, was born in Solo.
