= Don Mayhew =

American politician

Member of the Missouri House of Representatives from the 124th district
- Incumbent
- Assumed office 2019
- Preceded by: Keith Frederick
- Succeeded by: Kevin Onstott (elect)

Personal details
- Party: Republican

Donald Mayhew is an American politician serving in the Missouri House of Representatives. He won his first election from district 121 in 2018 after defeating Democrat Matt Heitz 69.3% to 30.7%. After redistricting in 2022, he won reelection in district 124.

== Electoral history ==
=== State representatives ===
Missouri House of Representatives Primary Election, August 7, 2018, District 121
Party	Candidate	Votes	%	±%
Republican	Don Mayhew	1,910	41.00%	
Republican	Matt Miller	1,602	34.39%	
Republican	Bruce Goodrich	1,146	24.60%	
Total votes		4,658	100.00%	

Missouri House of Representatives Election, November 6, 2018, District 121
Party	Candidate	Votes	%	±%
Republican	Don Mayhew	7,996	69.29%	
Democratic	Matt Heltz	3,544	30.71%	
Total votes		11,540	100.00%	

Missouri House of Representatives Election, November 3, 2020, District 121
Party	Candidate	Votes	%	±%
Republican	Don Mayhew	11,919	100.00%	+30.71
Total votes		11,919	100.00%	

Missouri House of Representatives Election, November 8, 2022, District 124
Party	Candidate	Votes	%	±%
Republican	Don Mayhew	11,380	100.00%	0.00
Total votes		11,380	100.00%	
