= Mary Kasten =

American politician (1928–2024)

Mary C. Kasten
- Born: June 6, 1928
- Died: October 12, 2024 (aged 96)
- Education: Southeast Missouri State University; University of Pittsburgh
- Occupation: Politician
- Political party: Republican
- Spouse: Melvin C. Kasten (m. 1949)

Mary C. Kasten (June 6, 1928 – October 12, 2024) was an American politician who was a Republican politician who served in the Missouri House of Representatives.

== Life and career ==
Born in or near Matthews, Missouri, she attended Matthews schools, Southeast Missouri State University, and the University of Pittsburgh. She married Dr. Melvin C. Kasten on June 19, 1949.

Kasten died on October 12, 2024, at the age of 96.
