= Clint Tracy =

American politician from Missouri (born 1974)

Member of the Missouri House of Representatives from the 158th district
- Incumbent
- Assumed office January 7, 2009
- Preceded by: Mary Kasten

Personal details
- Born: January 1, 1974 (age 52) Greenville, Illinois
- Party: Republican
- Spouse: Carissa Tracy
- Profession: Timber buyer, Politician
- Website: Website

Clinton "Clint" Tracy (born January 1, 1974) is a state representative currently serving his first term in the Missouri House of Representatives. He succeeded the seat held by former State Representative Mary Kasten (R-Cape Girardeau) who retired after filling out the remainder of the term of former State Representative Nathan Cooper (R-Cape Girardeau). Cooper pleaded guilty to immigration fraud in August 2007 and is subsequently in prison. A special election was held on Super Tuesday, February 5, 2008, which Kasten narrowly won with 50.2 percent of the vote over Democrat Mike Keefe's 43.4 percent and Libertarian Steve Kinder's 6.4 percent.

Tracy represents Missouri's 158th Legislative District, which consists of most of the city of Cape Girardeau. He is a member of the Republican Party.

== Early life and career ==
Tracy was born in Greenville, Illinois. He graduated from Cape Central High School in 1992. From there he attended the Naval Academy from 1992 to 1996 before serving in USS Dubuque LPD 8 in support of Operations Desert Thunder and Desert Fox from 1998 to 1999. He has also serves as a Commander in the Navy Reserves. In January 2007 he was recalled to active duty to serve with the Army Corps of Engineers in Baghdad, Iraq. He returned in October 2007 and ran for state representative. He currently is the Presiding Commissioner of Cape Girardeau County.

== Political career ==
Tracy faced a primary challenge from two other Republicans vying for the seat. These included Jeff Glenn, an executive with Delta Companies and former aide to former U.S. Senator Jim Talent (R-Mo.); and Wayne Wallingford, a retired Air Force officer and head of human resources for McDonald's of Southeast Missouri. Tracy took in 41.80 percent of the vote to clinch the GOP nomination on August 5, 2008. Because no Democrat filed to run, Tracy ran unopposed in the November 4, 2008 general election and faced token opposition from Libertarian Robert Roland. Tracy defeated Roland by a three-to-one margin, taking over 76 percent of the vote to Roland's 24 percent.

== Electoral history ==
2008 General Election for Missouri’s 158th District House of Representatives
Party	Candidate	Votes	%	±%
Republican	Clint Tracy	11,392	76.29	
Libertarian	Robert Roland	3,541	23.71	

2008 Primary Election for Missouri’s 158th District House of Representatives
Party	Candidate	Votes	%	±%
Republican	Clint Tracy	1,560	41.80	
Republican	Wayne Wallingford	1,215	32.56	
Republican	Jeff Glenn	957	25.64	
