= Steve Hodges =

American politician (1949–2024)

Member of the Missouri House of Representatives from the 149th district
- In office 2007–2015
- Succeeded by: Don Rone Jr.

Personal details
- Born: James Stephen Hodges; February 2, 1949 Cape Girardeau, Missouri, U.S.
- Died: October 9, 2024 (aged 75) Cape Girardeau, Missouri, U.S.
- Party: Democratic
- Spouse: Amy Johnson (m. 1972; div. 2014)
- Children: 3
- Education: Southeast Missouri State University; University of Missouri
- Occupation: Grocer; teacher

James Stephen Hodges Sr. (February 2, 1949 – October 9, 2024) was an American politician, educator, and former small business owner from the state of Missouri. Hodges served as a member of the Missouri House of Representatives since being elected in November 2006. A Democrat, he represented the 149th District, which includes all of New Madrid County as well as portions of Mississippi County and Pemiscot County from 2007 to 2015.

== Background ==
Born in Cape Girardeau, Missouri, James Stephen Hodges was raised in East Prairie, Missouri and was a graduate of East Prairie High School. Following high school he attended Southeast Missouri State University, where he received a bachelor's degree in business administration, and the University of Missouri, where he obtained a Master of Business Administration.

== Career ==
Prior to entering politics Hodges spent thirty years as manager and owner of an East Prairie supermarket. When not involved with his legislative duties he worked as a substitute teacher and a referee for various high school sports. He served on his local school board for twelve years before seeking election to the Missouri House of Representatives in 2006, winning his election. In 2012, he defeated local opera singer and America's Got Talent winner Neal E. Boyd to be re-elected to the Missouri House.

On February 16, 2013, he was chosen by Democratic Party leaders from southeast Missouri to run in a special election for Missouri's 8th congressional district to succeed U.S. Representative Jo Ann Emerson, who had resigned. Hodges came in second in the race while Jason Smith won the race. He was a conservative Democrat who opposed abortion and gun control, but said he was a Democrat because he had a "social conscience".

In the early morning hours of February 6, 2014, Representative Hodges was arrested on suspicion of drunk driving by police in Jefferson City, Missouri. When asked for comment on the incident Hodges told the Associated Press he had stopped in a parking lot and fell on some ice when exiting the vehicle. Unable to get to his feet, an ambulance and police were summoned to the scene. The state representative was transported to an area hospital where he was treated and released for unspecified injuries. It was then he was arrested but was not jailed. No charges have as yet been formally filed. Hodges issued a statement admitting that he had been drinking on the evening of February 5 but did not feel he was legally intoxicated. He apologized for the incident and said he was looking into receiving counseling.

== Personal life and death ==
In 1972, Hodges married Amy Johnson, and they had three sons. The couple divorced in 2014 after 41 years of matrimony. Their son Andrew was the valedictorian of his class at the United States Military Academy at West Point.

Hodges died at a care home in Cape Girardeau on October 9, 2024, at the age of 75.
