= Dan W. Brown =

American politician (1950–2021)

Member of the Missouri Senate from the 16th district
- In office 2011 – 2019
- Preceded by: Frank Barnitz
- Succeeded by: Justin Brown

Member of the Missouri House of Representatives from the 149th district
- In office 2008 – 2010
- Preceded by: Bob May

Personal details
- Born: December 22, 1950 Solo, Missouri, U.S.
- Died: May 11, 2021 (aged 70) Rolla, Missouri, U.S.
- Party: Republican
- Spouse: Kathy
- Children: 2
- Profession: Doctor of Veterinary medicine

Dan Wayne Brown (December 22, 1950 – May 11, 2021) was an American politician who served as a member of the Missouri Senate, representing the 16th district from 2011 to 2019. He also served in the Missouri House of Representatives from 2008 to 2010, representing the 149th district.

== Personal history ==
Dan Brown was born in Solo, Missouri, and was a graduate of Houston High School in Houston, Missouri. Brown received a Bachelor of Science degree in Agriculture and a Doctorate of Veterinary medicine from the University of Missouri. He was a practicing veterinarian for over 33 years and continued his practice in addition to his legislative duties. He died at the age of 70 on May 11, 2021.

== Political history ==
Dan Brown first entered statewide politics in 2008 when he defeated Democrat Wayne Bledsoe and Constitution Party candidate Dennis E. Husted to win the District 149 seat.

Missouri 149th District State Representative Election 2008
Party	Candidate	Votes	%	±%
Republican	Dan W. Brown	9,456	60%	Winner
Democratic	Wayne Bledsoe	6,013	38.2%	
Constitution	Dennis E. Husted	284	1.8%	

After only one term in the House, Brown chose to run for State Senator in 2010, defeating incumbent Democrat Frank Barnitz to win the 16th district seat.

Missouri 16th District State Senate Election 2010
Party	Candidate	Votes	%	±%
Republican	Dan W. Brown	31,792	58.3%	Winner
Democratic	Frank A. Barnitz	22,760	41.7%	

During the 96th General Assembly Senator Brown served on the following committees:

- Agriculture, Food Production, & Outdoor Resources.
- Appropriations.
- Education.
- Vice-chairman, Veterans Affairs, Emerging Issues, Pensions & Urban Affairs.

== Organizations ==
Senator Brown belonged to the following groups:

- Member, American Veterinary Medical Association.
- Member, Missouri Veterinary Medical Association.
- Missouri Farm Bureau.
- Missouri Farmers Association (MFA).
- Charter member, Paseo Biofuel.
- Charter member, Mid-Missouri Energy.
- Member, National Rifle Association.
- Member, Missouri Republican Party.
