= Keith Frederick =

American politician

Member of the Missouri House of Representatives from the 121st district
- In office 2011–2019
- Succeeded by: Don Mayhew

Personal details
- Born: November 6, 1952 (age 73) St. Louis, Missouri
- Party: Republican
- Spouse: Marylin
- Children: three
- Profession: orthopedic surgeon, pharmacist, businessman

Keith Frederick (born November 6, 1952) is an American politician. He is a Republican former member of the Missouri House of Representatives, having served from 2011 to 2019.
