= Diane Franklin (politician) =

American politician

Member of the Missouri House of Representatives from the 123rd district
- In office 2011–2019
- Succeeded by: Suzie Pollock

Personal details
- Born: February 2, 1956 (age 70) Camden County, Missouri
- Party: Republican
- Spouse: Chris Franklin
- Children: 2
- Profession: business owner and farmer

Diane Franklin (born February 2, 1956) is an American politician. She is a Republican former member of the Missouri House of Representatives, having served from 2011 to 2019.
