= Frank Barnitz =

American politician

Member of the Missouri Senate from the 16th district
- In office January 10, 2005 – January 2011
- Preceded by: Sarah Steelman
- Succeeded by: Dan W. Brown

Personal details
- Born: March 17, 1968 (age 58) Poplar Bluff, Missouri, U.S.
- Party: Democratic
- Spouse: Lisa Payne
- Education: Southwest Missouri State University (BA)

Frank Barnitz (born March 17, 1968) is an American farmer, businessman, and politician who served as a Democratic member of the Missouri State Senate and Missouri House of Representatives.

== Early life and education ==
Barnitz was born in Poplar Bluff, Missouri, and raised on his family's farm in Lake Spring, Missouri. He attended Rolla High School in Rolla, Missouri, and Southwest Missouri State University.

== Career ==
Barnitz was first elected to the Missouri House of Representatives in 2000, and served in that body until 2005. He was elected to the Missouri State Senate in a special election in 2005, and served in that body until 2011. He was defeated in the November 2010 election by Republican Dan Brown.

Barnitz is the owner and operator of Networth Feeds and Feeding, a custom feed mill, and manages Barnitz Farms in Lake Spring, Missouri.

== Personal life ==
Barnitz is married to Lisa Payne-Barnitz, and they have three daughters. Barnitz and his family are members of Grace Christian Church in Salem, Missouri.
