= Jo Ann Emerson =

American politician (born 1950)

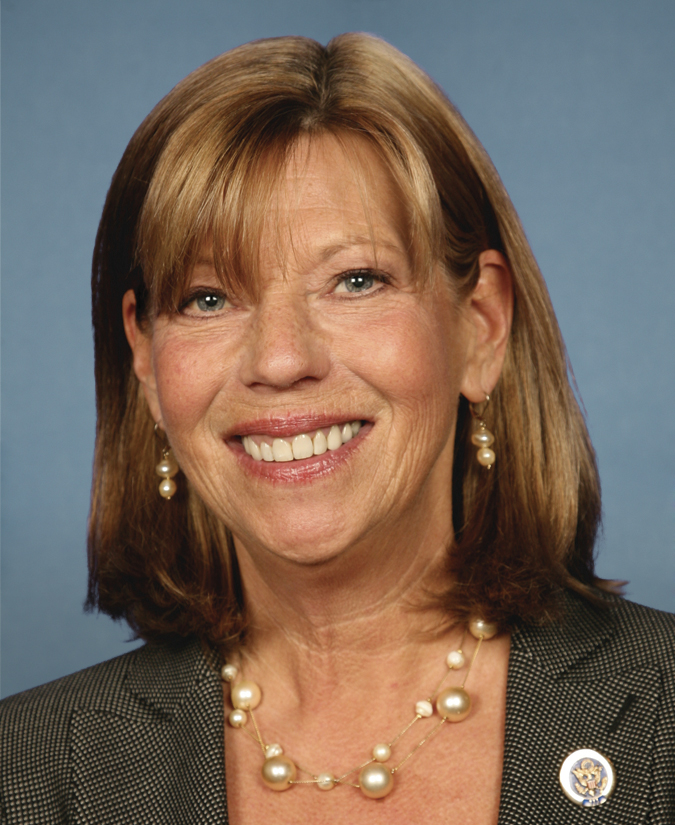

Member of the U.S. House of Representatives from Missouri's 8th district
- In office November 5, 1996 – January 22, 2013 (Note: Emerson's official service begins on the date of the special election, while the House was adjourned sine die until the start of the next Congress on January 3, 1997.)
- Preceded by: Bill Emerson
- Succeeded by: Jason Smith

Personal details
- Born: Jo Ann Hermann; September 16, 1950 (age 75) Bethesda, Maryland, U.S.
- Party: Republican (before 1996, 1997–present); Independent (1996–1997)
- Other political affiliations: House Republican Conference (1996–2013)
- Spouses: Bill Emerson (m. 1975; died 1996); Ron Gladney (m. 2000)
- Relatives: Al Hermann (father)
- Education: Ohio Wesleyan University (BA)

Jo Ann Emerson (née Hermann; born September 16, 1950) is an American politician who was the U.S. representative for Missouri's 8th congressional district from 1996 to 2013. The district consists of Southeast and South Central Missouri and includes the Bootheel, the Lead Belt and the Ozarks. Emerson is a member of the Republican Party. On January 22, 2013, Emerson resigned her seat in Congress to become the president and chief executive officer of the National Rural Electric Cooperative Association. She was CEO until August 2015.

With the defeat of Congressman Ike Skelton, Emerson became the dean of Missouri's congressional delegation in 2011.

== Early life, education and career ==
She was born Jo Ann Hermann in Bethesda, Maryland. She was a daughter of Al Hermann, who played for the Boston Braves baseball team from 1923 to 1924 and was executive director of the Republican National Committee. She graduated from Ohio Wesleyan University.

== U.S. House of Representatives ==
=== Committee assignments ===
- Committee on Appropriations
  - Subcommittee on Agriculture, Rural Development, Food and Drug Administration, and Related Agencies
  - Subcommittee on Financial Services and General Government (Chairwoman)
  - Subcommittee on the Legislative Branch (Vice Chair)

=== Other memberships ===
- Vice President of the NATO Parliamentary Assembly
  - Vice Chair of the Subcommittee on Democratic Governance
- Vice Chair of the Center Aisle Caucus
- Honorary and Life Trustee of Westminster College
- Co-chair of the board of directors for the Congressional Hunger Center
- Founding Member of the Bipartisan Congressional Retreat

Emerson, whose voting record in Congress has established her as one of the more moderate Republicans, has a history of bipartisanship while in the U.S. House of Representatives. She was a member of the moderate Republican groups the Republican Main Street Partnership and the Tuesday Group.

On May 24, 2005, Emerson was one of 50 Republicans to vote in favor of overturning President George W. Bush's ban on federal funding for embryonic stem cell research. She cast her "yea" vote the day after her mother-in-law died from Alzheimer's disease, one of the illnesses for which scientists believe they can create better treatments from stem cell research.

On July 12, 2007, Emerson was one of only four Republicans in the U.S. House of Representatives who voted to withdraw U.S. troops from Iraq by April 2008.

On September 15, 2009, Emerson was one of seven House Republicans to vote in favor of the Democrats' proposed resolution to condemn U.S. Representative Joe Wilson (R-South Carolina) for shouting "You lie!" in the middle of President Barack Obama's joint address to the U.S. Congress on health care reform.

Her margins of victory in the district have always been higher than those of GOP presidential candidates George W. Bush and John McCain as well as Republican gubernatorial candidates Kenny Hulshof, Matt Blunt and Jim Talent.

Emerson announced in early December 2012 her plans to retire from Congress in February 2013 to assume a position with the National Rural Electric Cooperative Association (NRECA) as its president and chief executive officer.

== Political campaigns ==
When her husband Bill died in 1996, Jo Ann announced she would run for his vacant seat. However, Missouri state law prohibited her from filing in the Republican primary for the general election. She thus had her party membership suspended. In November, Jo Ann Emerson competed in two elections on the same day. She ran as a Republican against Democrat Emily Firebaugh in the special election to finish the last two months of her late husband's eighth term, and as an independent against Democrat Firebaugh and Republican Richard Kline in the general election for a full two-year term. She won both elections easily, and was then reelected seven times without serious difficulty. She is the first Republican woman elected to the U.S. Congress from Missouri. She served the last two months of her husband's term as a Republican, then as an independent caucusing with the Republicans before officially becoming a Republican again at the onset of the new Congress in 1997. She was briefly the first independent elected to federal office in Missouri in 122 years and is the first, and so far only, woman to be elected and serve in Congress as an independent or third party member.

== Post-political career ==
In August 2015, Emerson took a leave of absence from the NRECA for medical reasons and was succeeded by her former congressional chief of staff and chief operating officer, Jeffrey Connor, in an interim capacity in November, effectively stepping down. In June 2016, fellow former U.S. House colleague Jim Matheson was named to succeed Emerson as CEO and took over her post in July. In March 2017, Emerson received the Clyde T. Ellis Award, the highest honor bestowed on an individual by America's electric cooperatives. On her behalf, her husband, Ron Gladney, accepted the award.

== Personal life ==
Hermann married future U.S. Representative Bill Emerson, a Republican from Cape Girardeau, on June 22, 1975. They had two daughters; Jo Ann also has five stepdaughters and a stepson. Bill was elected to the U.S. Congress in 1980 from Missouri's 10th Congressional District and, subsequent to redistricting, was reelected in 1982 from the 8th District. He died from cancer on June 22, 1996, a few months before the end of his eighth term. The Bill Emerson Memorial Bridge, which links Missouri to Illinois across the Mississippi River, was dedicated to commemorate his efforts to obtain federal funding for its construction.

Following Bill's death, Jo Ann married Ron Gladney in 2000. From this marriage she gained two stepdaughters and a stepson.

In 2015, Emerson had a stroke, leaving her paralyzed from the neck down. In April 2020, while living in a retirement community in Washington, D.C., she tested positive COVID-19 amid the pandemic and has recovered since.

== Electoral history ==
1996 Election for U.S. Representative of Missouri's 8th Congressional District
Party	Candidate	Votes	%	±%
Independent	Jo Ann Emerson	112,472	50.47	
Democratic	Emily Firebaugh	83,084	37.28	
Republican	Richard Kline	23,477	10.53	
Libertarian	Greg Tlapek	2,503	1.12	
Natural Law	David R. Zimmer	1,318	0.59	

1998 Election for U.S. Representative of Missouri's 8th Congressional District
Party	Candidate	Votes	%	±%
Republican	Jo Ann Emerson	104,271	62.62	+12.15
Democratic	Anthony J. "Tony" Heckemeyer	59,426	35.69	−1.59
Libertarian	John B. Hendricks Jr.	2,827	1.70	+0.58

2000 Election for U.S. Representative of Missouri's 8th Congressional District
Party	Candidate	Votes	%	±%
Republican	Jo Ann Emerson	162,239	69.31	+6.69
Democratic	Bob Camp	67,760	28.95	−6.74
Libertarian	John B. Hendricks Jr.	2,328	0.99	−0.71
Green	Tom Sager	1,739	0.74	

2002 Election for U.S. Representative of Missouri's 8th Congressional District
Party	Candidate	Votes	%	±%
Republican	Jo Ann Emerson	135,144	71.76	+2.45
Democratic	Gene Curtis	50,686	26.91	−2.04
Libertarian	Eric Van Oostrom	2,491	1.32	+0.33

2004 Election for U.S. Representative of Missouri's 8th Congressional District
Party	Candidate	Votes	%	±%
Republican	Jo Ann Emerson	194,039	72.21	+0.45
Democratic	Dean Henderson	71,543	26.62	−0.29
Libertarian	Stan Cuff	1,810	0.67	−0.65
Constitution	Leonard J. Davidson	1,319	0.49	

2006 Election for U.S. Representative of Missouri's 8th Congressional District
Party	Candidate	Votes	%	±%
Republican	Jo Ann Emerson	156,164	71.64	−0.57
Democratic	Veronica J. Hambacker	57,557	26.40	−0.22
Libertarian	Branden C. McCullough	4,268	1.96	+1.29

2008 Election for U.S. Representative of Missouri's 8th Congressional District
Party	Candidate	Votes	%	±%
Republican	Jo Ann Emerson	198,798	71.44	−0.20
Democratic	Joe Allen	72,790	26.16	−0.24
Libertarian	Branden C. McCullough	4,443	1.60	−0.36
Constitution	Richard L. Smith	2,257	0.81	

2010 Election for U.S. Representative of Missouri's 8th Congressional District
Party	Candidate	Votes	%	±%
Republican	Jo Ann Emerson	128,499	65.56	−5.88
Democratic	Tommy Sowers	56,377	28.76	+2.60
Independent	Larry Bill	7,193	3.67	+3.67
Libertarian	Rick Vandeven	3,930	2.01	+0.41

2012 Election for U.S. Representative of Missouri's 8th Congressional District
Party	Candidate	Votes	%	±%
Republican	Jo Ann Emerson	216,083	71.93	+6.37
Democratic	Jack Rushin	73,755	24.55	−4.21
Libertarian	Rick Vandeven	10,553	3.51	+1.50

== See also ==
- Women in the United States House of Representatives

U.S. House of Representatives
Preceded by Bill Emerson	Member of the U.S. House of Representatives from Missouri's 8th congressional district 1996–2013	Succeeded by Jason T. Smith
Party political offices
Preceded by Charlie Dent; Mark Kirk	Chair of the Tuesday Group; 2010–2013; Served alongside: Mark Kirk (2010), Charlie Dent (2010–2013)	Succeeded by Charlie Dent; Adam Kinzinger; Erik Paulsen
U.S. order of precedence (ceremonial)
Preceded by Tom Coleman as Former U.S. Representative	Order of precedence of the United States as Former U.S. Representative	Succeeded by Blaine Luetkemeyer as Former U.S. Representative
