= Sarah Steelman =

American politician (born 1958)

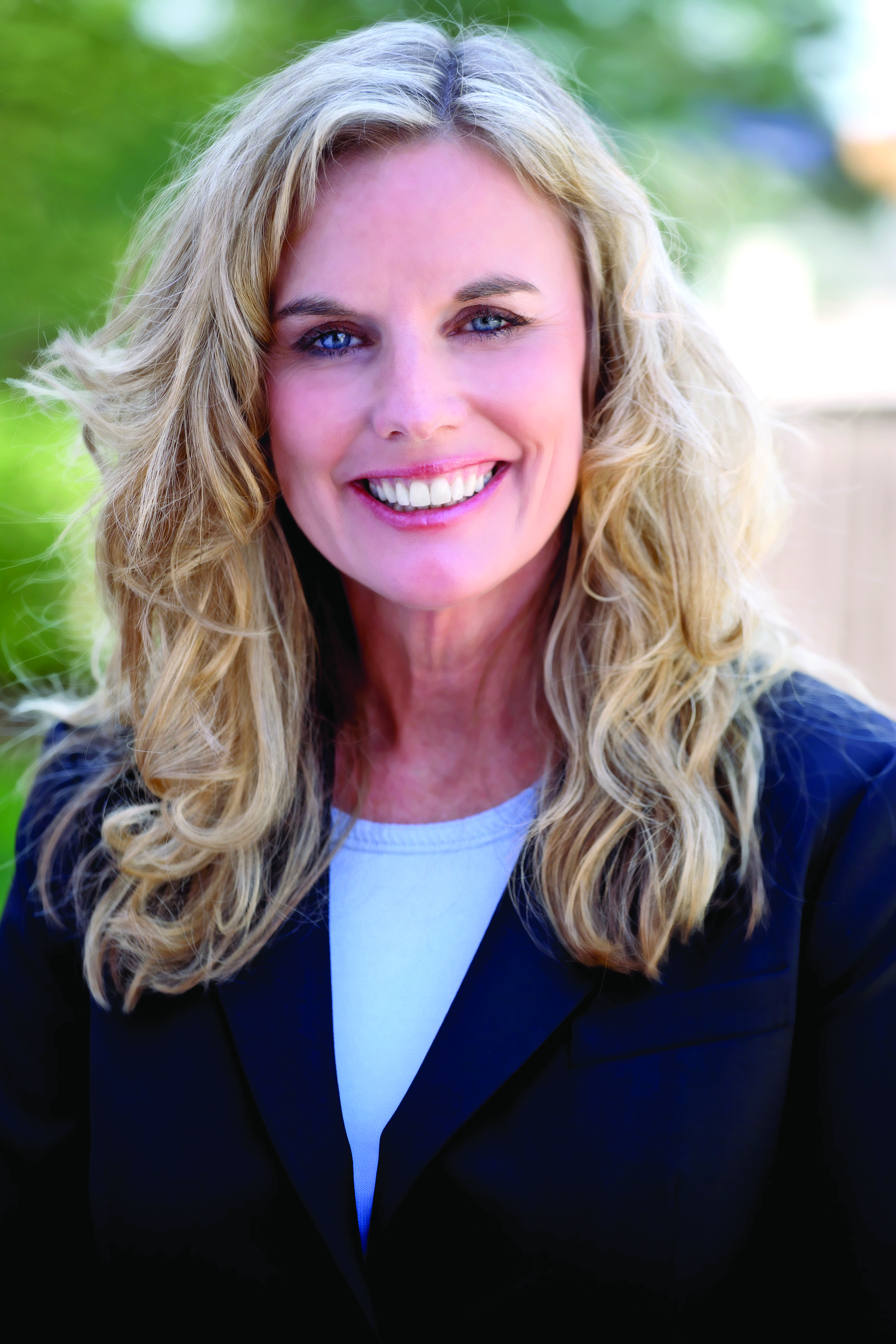

Commissioner of the Missouri Office of Administration
- In office February 9, 2017 – October 12, 2021
- Governor: Eric Greitens; Mike Parson
- Preceded by: Doug Nelson

44th State Treasurer of Missouri
- In office January 10, 2005 – January 12, 2009
- Governor: Matt Blunt
- Preceded by: Nancy Farmer
- Succeeded by: Clint Zweifel

Member of the Missouri Senate from the 16th district
- In office January 6, 1999 – January 10, 2005
- Preceded by: Mike Lybyer
- Succeeded by: Frank Barnitz

Personal details
- Born: Sarah Hearne; May 3, 1958 (age 68) Jefferson City, Missouri, U.S.
- Party: Republican
- Spouse: David Steelman
- Education: University of Missouri Business School (MA); University of Missouri (BA)
- Profession: Economist
- Website: sarahsteelman.com

Sarah Steelman (born Sarah Hearne; May 3, 1958) is an American Republican politician from Missouri and State Treasurer from 2005 to 2009. She recently served in the Office of Administration in Governor Mike Parson’s administration. She did not run for re-election as state treasurer in 2008, having run for governor, and was succeeded in office by Democrat Clint Zweifel on January 12, 2009. She was listed in a 2008 article in The New York Times as among seventeen women who may someday run for President of the United States. On November 29, 2010, Steelman announced she would run for the U.S. Senate in 2012. She was defeated in the Republican primary by U.S. Representative Todd Akin.

== Early life, education, and economics career ==
Sarah Steelman is the second wife of David Steelman, former Republican Leader in the Missouri House. Her father, John Hearne, is a senior partner in the Jefferson City law firm of Hearne and Green. Her father-in-law is the late Dorman Steelman, a former chairman of the Missouri Republican Party.

She attended Jefferson City public schools before attending University of Missouri, from where she holds a Bachelor of Arts degree in History and a Master of Arts degree in Economics. Prior to her election in 1998, Steelman served as deputy director of the Missouri Department of Natural Resources. She also worked as an economist for the Missouri Department of Revenue and as an adjunct professor of Economics at Lincoln University of Missouri in Jefferson City.

== Political career ==
=== State Senate ===
In 1998, Steelman ran against incumbent Democratic State Senator Michael Lybyer, who was popular and running for a fifth term. In his previous re-election campaign in 1994, Lybyer defeated State Representative Merrill Townley with 55% of the vote, despite the national Republican wave that year. In 1998, Steelman defeated Lybyer by a 58% to 42% margin. Steelman represented Callaway, Osage, Gasconade, Maries, Phelps, Crawford, Texas, and Dent counties. In 2002, she won re-election with 71% of the vote.

Steelman endorsed John McCain for president in 2000. She briefly considered running for the U.S. Senate in November 2002 against Senator Jean Carnahan, but instead she opted to run for re-election to her seat in the state Senate.

=== State Treasurer ===
In 2004, Steelman ran for State Treasurer of Missouri. In the Republican primary, she won a plurality of vote (39%) and defeated State Representative Blaine Luetkemeyer, businessman Tom Klein, State Senator Anita Yeckel, Chaplain Al Hanson, businessman Will Pundmann, and former State Representative Chet Boeke. In the general election, she defeated Democrat Mark Powell, Mayor of Arnold, Missouri, with 51% of the vote. She became the second woman elected to that post, succeeding Nancy Farmer.

Although several leaders in the Missouri Republican Party (including former Governor Matt Blunt, Lt. Gov. Peter Kinder, former House Speaker Rod Jetton, and former U.S. Senator Jim Talent) had indicated their support for Mitt Romney in 2008, Steelman reportedly was "leaning toward McCain again in 2008."

Steelman was the first major convert to "Divest Terror", a Terror-free investing strategy of the Center for Security Policy that enjoys some national following. As Steelman implements it, the program invests in funds that divest assets in North Korea, Iran, Syria, and Sudan. In her capacity as an ex officio board member of a pension system for Missouri government workers, she requested similar divestments from countries on the State Sponsors of Terrorism list. However, the St. Louis Post-Dispatch reported that Steelman's personal investments failed to comply with this policy.

=== 2008 run for Governor ===
On the morning of January 22, 2008, Steelman announced that she would seek a second term as state treasurer, but changed her mind when Governor Matt Blunt announced he would not seek reelection later that same afternoon. Following Blunt's announcement, Steelman announced she would run for governor.

Steelman ran against Republicans Kenny Hulshof, Scott Long and Jen Sievers, losing to Hulshof's 194,616 votes with her 176,847.

Steelman taught a class titled "Leadership and Changing Public Policy" during the Fall 2009 semester at Missouri State University.

=== 2012 run for U.S. Senate ===
Steelman was the first Republican to file. The incumbent, Democrat Claire McCaskill, ran for her second term. Steelman faced U.S. 2nd district Congressman Todd Akin and St. Louis businessman John Brunner in the August 2012 primary. Akin officially declared his candidacy May 17, 2011. Minor candidates included Mark Memoly, an Author, ATB Executive, and Retired Ford Motor Company Manager, and Mark Lodes. On July 17, 2012, Steelman's candidacy was endorsed by the former Alaska governor and 2008 Republican vice-presidential candidate Sarah Palin. Steelman lost the primary election finishing a close third with 29% of the vote, to Akin's winning 36% and Brunner's 30%. Akin lost the general election by a wide margin.

Party political offices
Preceded by Todd P. Graves	Republican nominee for State Treasurer of Missouri; 2004	Succeeded by Brad Lager
Political offices
Preceded by Nancy Farmer	Missouri State Treasurer; 2005–2009	Succeeded by Clint Zweifel
