= Special routes of U.S. Route 60 =

Special routes of U.S. Route 60

Highway system
- United States Numbered Highway System; List; Special; Divided

U.S. Route 60 has 25 current special routes. Of these, 20 are business routes, two alternate routes, one bypass route, and one truck route. US 60 has also had one additional business route, an additional bypass route, a temporary route, and another truck route (all now decommissioned).

== Tonkawa business loop ==
U.S. Highway 60 Business
- Location: Tonkawa, Oklahoma
- Length: 3 mi (4.8 km)

Business US 60 in Tonkawa begins at an interchange on the north side of Tonkawa. It heads south in a concurrency with U.S. Route 77, then turns east on North Avenue. East of Tonkawa, the route turns back north to reunite with the main route.

The entire route is in Kay County.

Location	mi	km	Destinations	Notes
Tonkawa	0.0	0.0	US 60 / US 77 north	Western end of US-77 concurrency; Interchange
Tonkawa	1.0	1.6	US 77 south (South Main Street)	Eastern end of US-77 concurrency
	3.0	4.8	US 60 / US 77 / US 177	Interchange
1.000 mi = 1.609 km; 1.000 km = 0.621 mi: Concurrency terminus

== Ponca City business loop ==
U.S. Highway 60 Business
- Location: Ponca City, Oklahoma
- Length: 4.6 mi (7.4 km)

Business US 60 in Ponca City begins at an interchange with US 60 and US 177 (the E. W. Marland Memorial Highway) and continues east down South Avenue. It turns north onto Waverly Street on the western edge of town, running north for roughly half a mile, before turning east Grand Avenue. The route then heads east through downtown, serving businesses and residences alike. At 14th Street, it turns south, forming a concurrency with U.S. Route 77. It rejoins the main highway in the southeast part of the city.

== Seneca business loop ==
U.S. Route 60 Business
- Location: Seneca, Missouri
- Length: 2.1 mi (3.4 km)

Business US 60 in Seneca begins west of the city in Oklahoma. It follows an old alignment of US 60 into the town, crossing the state line at the city limits. At Route 43, it turns south (and off the old alignment of US 60) back to the main highway. US 60 Bus., on the west side of Route 43, serves as a truck bypass route for a steep grade just south of Seneca.

== Neosho business loop ==
U.S. Route 60 Business
- Location: Neosho, Missouri
- Length: 7.0 mi (11.3 km)

Business US 60 in Neosho begins at the intersection of US 60 and Interstate 49 Business. The road briefly forms a concurrency with Business I-49, before turning off and heading north on Neosho Boulevard. At Harmony Street, the road begins another concurrency with Route 86. Neosho Boulevard curves east becoming Coler Street, then Business US 60 turns north on College Street (leaving Route 86), which rejoins the main highway northeast of the city at an interchange.

== Monett business loop ==
U.S. Route 60 Business
- Location: Monett, Missouri
- Length: 5.0 mi (8.0 km)

Business US 60 in Monett begins at Kyler Street (in a concurrency with Route H) in south central Monett. It crosses over a viaduct, where Kyler Street becomes 13th Street and joins the old alignment of US 60 in the city. At Cleveland Street, the concurrency with Route H ends and the business route turns east, eventually rejoining the main route east of the city.

== Verona-Aurora business loop ==
U.S. Route 60 Business
- Location: Verona–Aurora, Missouri
- Length: 8.0 mi (12.9 km)

Business US 60 in the Verona–Aurora area begins southwest of Verona, through which it briefly passes. After leaving Verona, the road heads east through a rural area becoming South Street in Aurora. The street curves around, becoming Church Street. At Elliot Avenue is an intersection with Missouri routes 39 and 265. The road continues down Church Street, curving southeast and rejoining the main route southeast of Aurora. Sections of this route (but not the entire route) are part of old US 60.

== Rogersville business loop ==
U.S. Route 60 Business
- Location: Rogersville, Missouri
- Length: 3.6 mi (5.8 km)

Business US 60 in Rogersville is an old alignment of US 60 its entire length. The highway follows Center Street, leaving the main highway which curves to the south. Where the main highway curves back north east of the city, the business route rejoins the main route.

== Mansfield business loop ==
U.S. Route 60 Business
- Location: Mansfield, Missouri
- Length: 1.9 mi (3.1 km)

Business US 60 in Mansfield begins at the interchange of US 60 and Route 5, with which the business route is briefly united. It joins the old highway alignment just south of the interchange, turning east. The route curves around to become Clark Street, which angles off to become Commercial Street in the downtown area. In the middle of the city, the business route leaves the old alignment (which continues down Route A) and turns north to rejoin the main route in the northeast corner of Mansfield.

== Mountain Grove business loop ==
U.S. Route 60 Business
- Location: Wright and Texas counties in Missouri
- Length: 6.5 mi (10.5 km)

U.S. Route 60 Business in Mountain Grove is a 6.5 miles (10.5 km) southern business loop off US 60 that mostly follows an old alignment of US 60 in Wright and Texas counties in Missouri and connects US 60 and Outer Road (west of Mountain Grove) with US 60 and Route MM in Dunn.

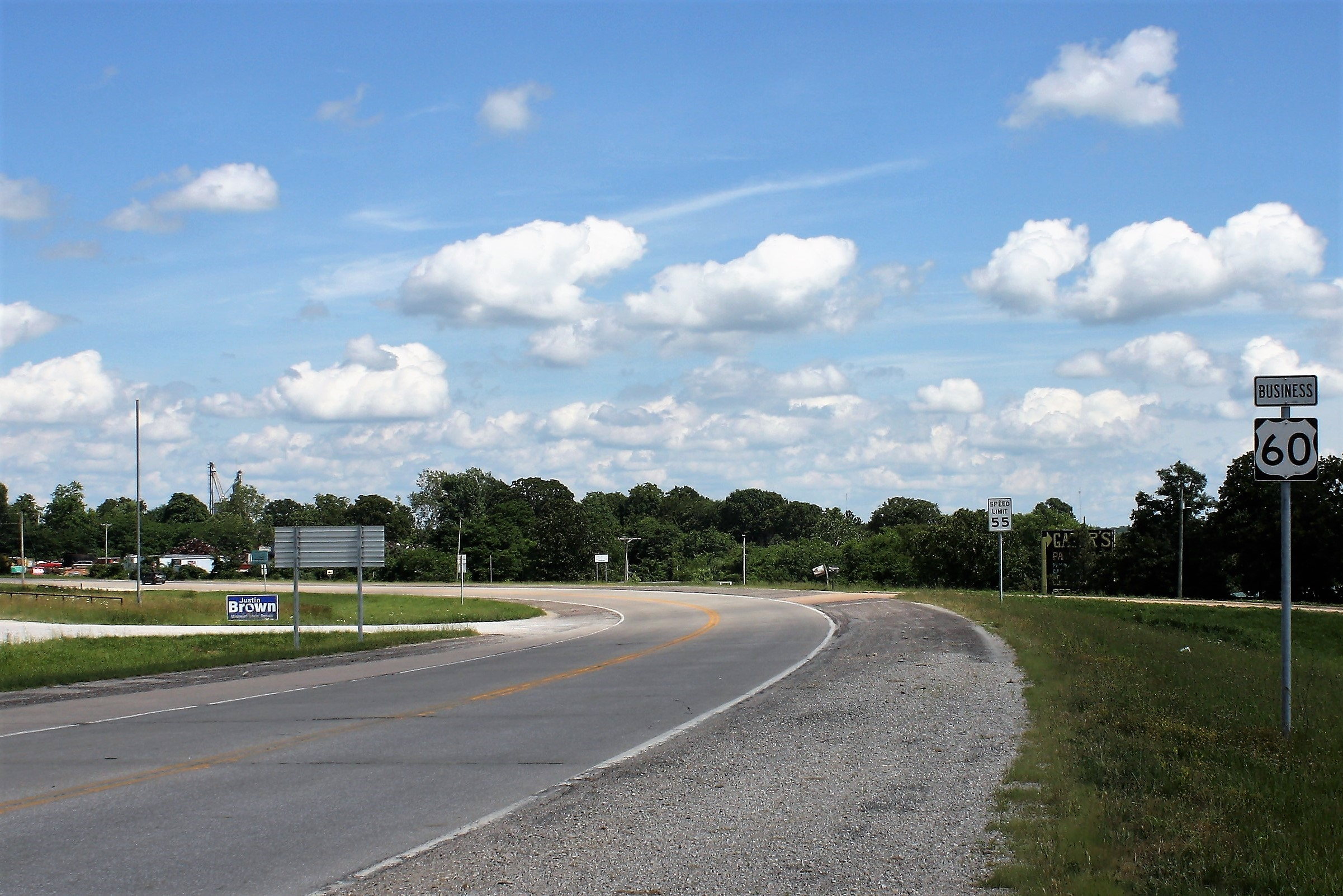
First reassurance marker along eastbound US 60 Bus. from US 60, June 2022

US 60 Bus. begins at a diamond interchange with US 60 (non-numbered exit) in Wright County, just over one mile (1.6 km) west of Mountain Grove. (US 60 heads east towards Mountain Grove and US 60 Bus. US 60 heads west towards Springfield and Neosho. Outer Road continues west from the interchange.)

From its western terminus, US 60 Bus. curves to head east and promptly connects with Old Highway 60 (former routing of US 60) at a T intersection. (Old Highway 60 previously continued west along the south side of the current US 60 through Norwood and Mansfield. However, the bridge along the road that crossed Whestone Creek, about 4.5 miles [7.2 km] west of Mountain Grove, has not existed for many decades.) After continuing east for nearly one mile (1.6 km), US 60 Bus. enters Mountain Grove to run along West Third Street. After 1 more mile (1.6 km), US 60 Bus. reaches its junction with Missouri Route 95 (Route 95 / North Main Street) in the center of the city. (Route 95 heads north to cross US 60 and then on towards Dawson and Lynchburg. Route 95 heads south towards Prior and Gentryville.)

Beyond Route 95 West Third Street becomes East State Street, along which US 60 Bus. continues east for 0.8 miles (1.3 km) before connecting with the south end of North Hubbard Avenue at the eastern city limits of Mountain Grove. At North Hubbard Street, US 60 Bus. also leaves Wright County and enters Texas County. Just over one and a half miles (2.4 km) farther east US 60 Bus. curves to proceed east-northeast for just over one and a half miles (2.4 km) before reaching the unincorporated community of Dunn. Upon entering Dunn, US 60 Bus. curves to the north and promptly reaches its eastern terminus as another diamond interchange with US 60 (non-numbered exit) and Route MM. (US 60 heads east towards Cabool, Willow Springs, and Sikeston. US 60 heads west towards Mountain Grove and the west end of US 60 Bus. Route MM heads north towads Bendavis.)

County	Location	mi	km	Destinations	Notes
Wright		0.0	0.0	Outer Rd west	Continuation west from western terminus
Wright		0.0	0.0	US 60 east – Mountain Grove, US 60 Bus. US 60 west – Springfield, Neosho	Western terminus; diamond interchange; US 60 exit not numbered
Wright		0.3	0.48	Old Hwy 60 west	T intersection; former routing of US 60
Wright	Mountain Grove	2.2	3.5	Route 95 north (North Main St) – Dawson, Lynchburg Route 95 south (North Main St) – Prior, Gentryville	
Wright–Texas county line	Mountain Grove	3.0	4.8	North Hubbard Ave north	T intersection; eastern city limits of Mountain Grove
Texas	Dunn	6.5	10.5	US 60 east – Cabool, Willow Springs, Sikeston US 60 west – Mountain Grove, US 60 Bus.	Eastern terminus; diamond interchange; US 60 exit not numbered
Texas	Dunn	6.5	10.5	Route MM north – Bendavis	Continuation north from eastern terminus
1.000 mi = 1.609 km; 1.000 km = 0.621 mi: Route transition

== Cabool business loop ==
U.S. Route 60 Business
- Location: Texas County, Missouri
- Length: 4.8 mi (7.7 km)

U.S. Route 60 Business in Cabool is a 4.8-mile (7.7 km) northern business loop off US 60 that mostly follows an old alignment of US 60 in Texas County, Missouri and connects US 60 (west of Cabool) with US 60 / US Route 63 on the southeastern edge of Cabool.

US 60 Bus. begins at an incomplete diamond interchange with US 60 (non-numbered exit) west of Cabool. The US 60 interchange only has an eastbound off ramp and a westbound on ramp. (US 60 heads west towards Maple Grove, Springfield, and Neosho.) From its western terminus US 60 Bus. proceeds east for 0.8 miles (1.3 km) before connecting with the south end of Route M at a T intersection on the western edge of Cabool. (Route M heads north to end at Missouri Route 38 in Fairview.) Continuing easterly into the city of Cabool US 60 Bus. runs along Ozark Street for 1.9 miles (3.1 km) before reaching the north end of Missouri Route 181 (Route 181) at Peabody Avene near the center of the city. (Peabody Avenue heads north to quickly reach Cabool High School. Route 181 heads south along Peabody Avenue to connect with US 60 and then on towards Dora and Gainesville.)

Beyond Peabody Avenue US 60 Bus. continues easterly along Ozark Street for nine blocks before turning northeast and reaching its western junction with US 63 at another T intersection. (US 63 heads north towards Houston, Licking, and Jefferson City.) From its western junction with US 63, US 60 Bus. the two highways proceed concurrently to cross the Big Piney River. Just over a mile after the river crossing US 63 / US 60 Bus. reaches the eastern terminus of US 60 Bus at a diamond interchange with US 60. (US 60 / US 63 heads southeast towards Willow Springs, the southeastern junction of US 60 & US 63, and West Plains. US 60 heads west to connect with Route 181 and then the western end of US 60 Bus.)

The entire route is in Texas County.

Location	mi	km	Destinations	Notes
	0.0	0.0	US 60 west – Mountain Grove, Springfield, Neosho	Western terminus. partial interchange (eastbound off ramp, westbound on ramp); no exit number on US 60
Cabool	0.8	1.3	Route M north – Fairview	T intersection; south end of Route M
Cabool	2.7	4.3	Peabody Ave north – Cabool High School Route 181 south (Peabody Ave) – US 60, Dora, Gainesville	T intersection; north end of Route 181
Cabool	3.3	5.3	US 63 north – Houston, Licking, Jefferson City	T intersection; western end of US 63 concurrency
Cabool	3.7	6.0	Bridge over the Big Piney River	
Cabool	4.8	7.7	US 60 east / US 63 south – Willow Springs, US 60 & US 63 junction, West Plains US 63 west – Route 181, US 60 Bus.	Western terminus. modified diamond interchange; eastern end of US 63 concurrency; no exit number on US 60 / US 63
1.000 mi = 1.609 km; 1.000 km = 0.621 mi: Concurrency terminus; Incomplete access

== Willow Springs business loop ==
U.S. Route 60 Business
- Location: Willow Springs, Missouri
- Length: 2.1 mi (3.4 km)

Business US 60 in Willow Springs is joined with Business US 63 its entire length (as are the main highways around the city). In downtown Willow Springs, Business 60/63 intersects Route 137 at Harris Street. The business routes rejoin the main highway in the southeast part of the city.

== Van Buren business loop ==
U.S. Route 60 Business
- Location: Van Buren, Missouri
- Length: 2.1 mi (3.4 km)

Business US 60 in Van Buren begins in the southern part of the city, leaving the main highway going west on James Street. At Main Street, the business route turns north, turning northeast. It rejoins the main highway east of Van Buren.

== Poplar Bluff business loop ==
U.S. Route 60 Business
- Location: Poplar Bluff, Missouri
- Length: 8.1 mi (13.0 km)

Business US 60 in Poplar Bluff begins in the northwest corner of the city at the interchange of US 60 and US 67 (Future I-57). It begins in a concurrency with Business US 67. At Pine Boulevard, Business US 60 leaves the concurrency, turning east. Pine Boulevard curves to run northeast through the city, and the business route rejoins the main route east of the city.

== Dexter business loop ==
U.S. Route 60 Business
- Location: Dexter, Missouri
- Length: 4.1 mi (6.6 km)

Business US 60 in Dexter begins on the west side of the city and heads east. At Walnut Street is an intersection with Business Route 25. In the eastern part of the city, is an intersection with non-special Route 25, where Business US 60 turns north and joins Route 25. The business route rejoins the main route northeast of Dexter.

== Sikeston business loop ==
U.S. Route 60 Business
- Location: New Madrid and Scott counties in Missouri
- Length: 6.2 mi (10.0 km)

U.S. Route 60 Business in Sikeston is a 6.2 miles (10.0 km) northern business loop off US 60 that mostly follows an old alignment of US 60 in New Madrid and Scott counties in Missouri, that connects US 60 and Route FF (southwest of Sikeston) with US 60 and U.S. Route 61 / U.S. Route 62 in southern Sikeston.

US 60 Bus. begins at an intersection with US 60 (future Interstate 57) and the north end of Route FF southwest of Sikeston in New Madrid County. (US 60 heads east towards Sikeston and the east end of US 60 Bus. US 60 heads west toward Morehouse, Dexter, and Popular Bluff. Route FF heads south towards Matthews.) From its western terminus US 60 Bus. proceeds north for 1.2 miles (1.9 km) to leave New Madrid County and enter Scott County before promptly reaching its western junction with Missouri Route 114 (Route 114) and the south end of Route BB in the unincorporated community of Borwns. (Route 114 heads west towards Morehouse and Dexter and Route BB heads north towards the westernmost part of Sikeston.)

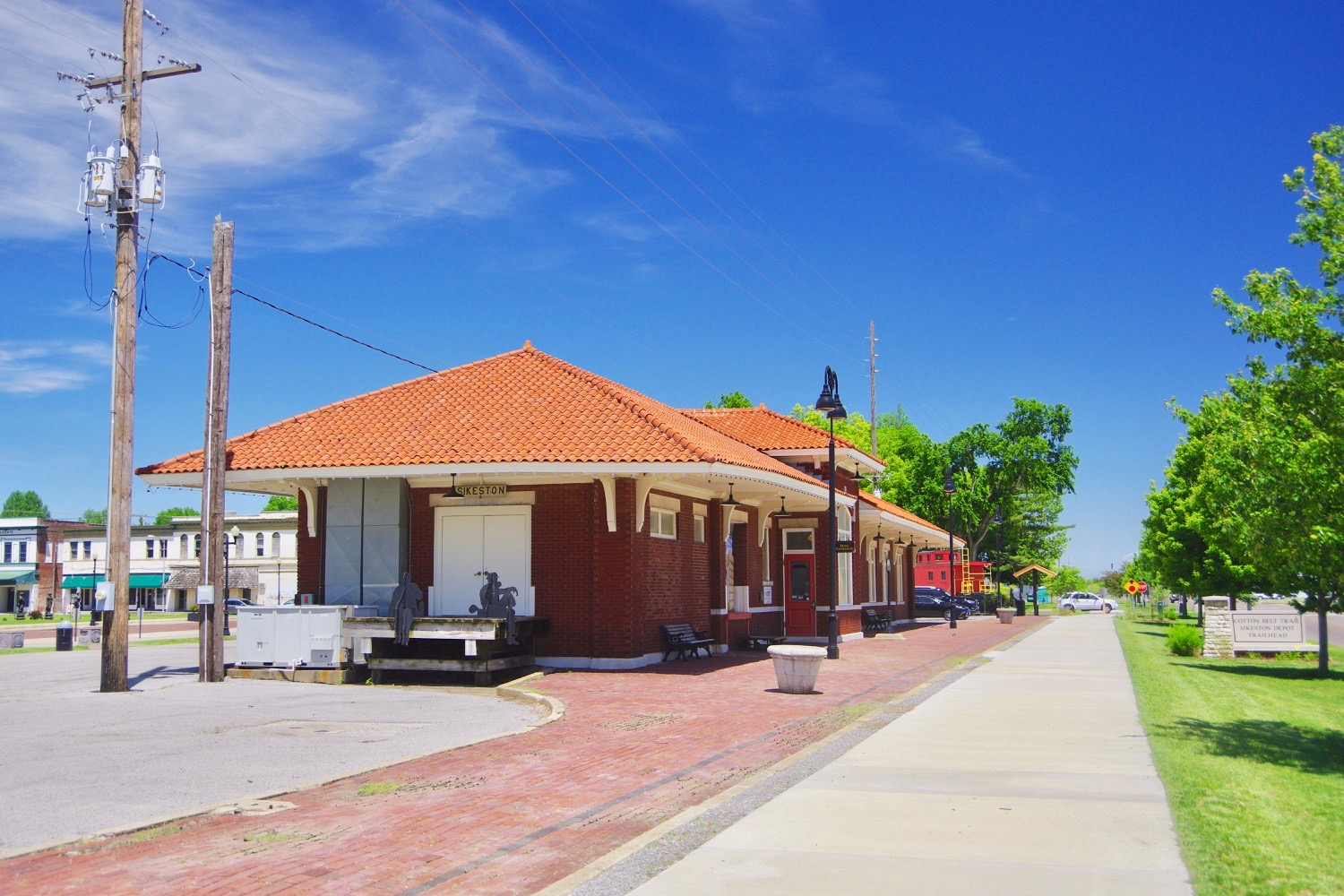
The Sikeston Depot along US 60 Bus. / Missouri Route 114 in Sikeston, May 2020

From its western junction with Route 114, US 60 Bus. proceeds east-northeast (concurrently with road railway tracks ran just north of and parallel with Malone Avene, but sometime between 2009 and 2012 the tracks were removed.) About 2.7 miles (4.3 km) beyond Browns, US 60 Bus. / Route 114 crosses Kingshighway, formerly U.S. Route 61 Bus.. (Kingshighway heads north towards U.S. Route 61 [US 61] and heads south towards US 61 / US 62 / US 60 Bus.) One-half mile (0.80 km) later US 60 Bus. / Route 114 reaches a junction with U.S. Route 61 and U.S. Route 62. This junction is also the eastern end of Route 114. (US 62 heads east along East Malone Avenue towards Bertrand and Bement. US 61 heads north along Great River Road / Main Street / Blues Highway towards Benton.) From the intersection of Main Street and Malone Avenue, US 60 Bus. / US 61 / US 62 proceed concurrently south along Great River Road / South Main Street / Blues Highway for one-half of a mile (0.80 km) before connecting with the west end of Murray Lane at a T intersection. (Murray Lane heads west to cross Kinghighway [formerly US 61 Bus.].)

While still in Sikeston, at Murray Lane US 60 Bus. / US 61 / US 62 leaves Scott County and enters New Madrid County as the concurrent highways continue south. After just over 1 mile (1.6 km) US 60 Bus. / US 61 / US 62 reach US 60 (future I-57) at a diamond interchange (non-numbered exit), which is US 60 Bus.'s eastern terminus (US 60 heads east towards Bertrand and Charleston, and then Cairo in Illinois. US 60 heads west to connect with the west end of US 60 Bus. US 61 / US 62 continue south along Great River Road / Blues Highway towards Pinhook and Allendale.)

County	Location	mi	km	Destinations	Notes
New Madrid		0.0	0.0	Route FF south – Matthews	Continuation south from western terminus
New Madrid		0.0	0.0	US 60 east (future Interstate 57) – Sikeston, US 60 Bus. US 60 west (future Interstate 57) – Morehouse, Dexter, Poplar Bluff	Western terminus; northern end of Route FF
Scott	Browns	1.2	1.9	Route 114 west – Morehouse, Dexter Route BB north – Sikeston	Western end of Route 114 concurrency; southern end of Route BB
Scott	Sikeston	3.9	6.3	North Kingshighway north – US 61; South Kingshighway south – US 61 / US 62	Formerly US 61 Bus.
Scott	Sikeston	4.4	7.1	US 62 east (East Malone Ave) – Bertrand, Bement US 61 north (Great River Road / South Main St / Blues Hwy) – Benton; Route 114 end	Western end of US 60 / US 61 concurrency; eastern end of Route 114 concurrency; east end of Route 114
Scott–New Madrid county line	Sikeston	5.1	8.2	Murray Ln west – Kingshighway (formerly US 61 Bus.)	T intersection
New Madrid	Sikeston	6.2	10.0	US 60 east (future Interstate 57) – Bertrand, Charleston, Cairo (Illinois) US 60 west (future Interstate 57) – US 60 Bus.	Eastern terminus; diamond interchange; eastern end of US 60 / US 61 concurrency; US 60 exit not numbered
New Madrid	Sikeston	6.2	10.0	US 60 south / US 61 west (Great River Road / South / Blues Hwy) – Pinhook, Allendale	Continuation south from eastern terminus
1.000 mi = 1.609 km; 1.000 km = 0.621 mi: Concurrency terminus; Route transition

== Paducah business loop ==
U.S. Route 60 Business
- Location: Paducah, Kentucky
- Length: 5.6 mi (9.0 km)

Business US 60 in Paducah begins at Park Avenue where US 60 turns south. At HC Mathis Drive is an intersection with U.S. Route 45. Near the Ohio River, Park Avenue curves south becoming Fourth Street. Fourth Street angles off to become Third Street, which curves around to become Wayne Sullivan Drive. In the southeast part of Paducah, the business route rejoins the main highway.

== Cloverport business loop ==
U.S. Route 60 Business
- Location: Cloverport, Kentucky

Business US 60 in Cloverport begins southwest of the city in a concurrency with Kentucky Route 144. It heads east into the city, then north towards the Ohio River, and heads east near the river. At Elm Street is an intersection with Kentucky Route 105. The highway curves around, rejoining the main route in the southwest part of Cloverport.

== Louisville alternate route ==
U.S. Route 60 Alternate
- Location: Louisville, Kentucky
- Length: 10.5 mi (16.9 km)

Alternate US 60 in Louisville begins at the intersection of the Dixie Highway (US 60 and U.S. Route 31W) and KY 2049, turning east onto 7th Street Road. It zigzags through the area, following Berry Boulevard, Taylor Boulevard, Central Avenue (at the entrance to Churchill Downs racetrack, home of The Kentucky Derby and Kentucky Oaks), Crittenden Drive, and Eastern Parkway. It passes beside the University of Louisville, and just east of there it has an interchange with Interstate 65. At Bardstown Road (US 31E/US 150), it turns off onto Cherokee Parkway, then angles off onto Lexington Road, crossing over Interstate 64. At St. Matthews, it rejoins the main highway.

== Versailles business loop ==
U.S. Route 60 Business
- Location: Versailles, Kentucky
- Length: 1.8 mi (2.9 km)

Business US 60 is the business route through the city of Versailles. Business US 60 is in a concurrency with US 62 to the downtown area, then heads east to join US 60 on the east side of Versailles.

== Lexington business loop ==
U.S. Route 60 Business
- Location: Lexington, Kentucky

Business US 60 began on the west side of the city on Versailles Road at New Circle Road (which carried Bypass US 60). Versailles Road heads downtown becoming High Street. High Street curves south through the downtown area. It leaves downtown on Midland Avenue, then Winchester Road. It rejoined the bypass route on the east side of Lexington at New Circle Road.

== Lexington bypass route ==
U.S. Route 60 Bypass
- Location: Lexington, Kentucky

Bypass US 60 serves as a northern bypass of Lexington. It is co-signed with Kentucky Route 4, commonly known as New Circle Road. At Leestown Pike is an intersection with U.S. Route 421 and at Georgetown Road is an intersection with U.S. Route 25. The road is a freeway to this point, where it becomes a divided highway. At Paris Pike is an intersection with U.S. Route 27 and U.S. Route 68. At Winchester Road, the bypass rejoins the business route to become non-special US 60.

== Clifton Forge business loop ==
U.S. Route 60 Business
- Location: Clifton Forge, Virginia
- Length: 3.7 mi (6.0 km)

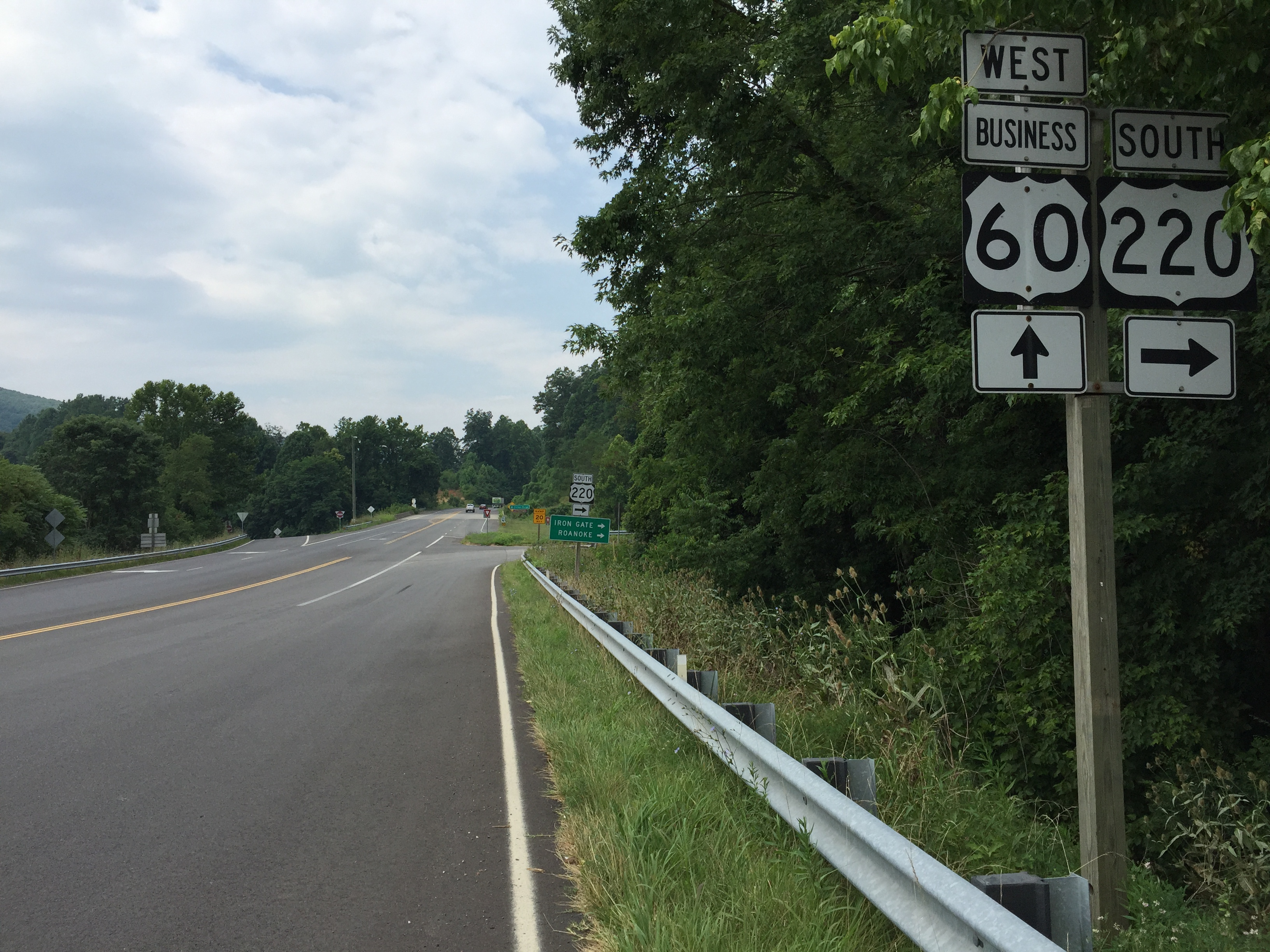
US 60 Bus. at US 220 just east of Clifton Forge

Business US 60 in Clifton Forge begins at the Interstate 64 exit 24 on the west side of the city. It starts in a concurrency with Business US 220 and is united with that road to A Street, where Business 220 turns south. After leaving Clifton Forge, Business US 60 joins non-special U.S. Route 220 and passes through Cliftondale Park before rejoining the main highway at the I-64 exit 27.

== Richmond truck route ==
U.S. Route 60 Truck
- Location: Richmond, Virginia

Truck US 60 in Richmond begins where US 60 turns north from Midlothan Turnpike onto Roanoke Street. It continues east along Midlothan Turnpike until it joins U.S. Route 360 (Hull Street) at the intersection of Clapton Street, and runs in concurrency with US 360, crossing the Mayo Bridge over the James River, and finally ending at US 60 between Cary Street and Main Street.

== Norfolk alternate route ==
U.S. Route 60 Alternate
- Location: Norfolk, Virginia

Alternate US 60 in Norfolk runs along VA 168 (Tidewater Drive) from US 60 to US 460 (Granby Street), and along US 460 between VA 168 and US 60.

== Former special routes ==
=== Arizona temporary route ===
U.S. Route 60T
- Location: Arizona
- Existed: 1952–1958

Temporary US 60 connected Globe and Springerville, Arizona in the 1950s. It was united with U.S. Route 70 from Globe to Peridot, then turned north through Fort Apache, Whiteriver, McNary, and Eagar, Arizona. It is now State Routes 170, 73, 260, and some local roads in the San Carlos Apache and Fort Apache Indian Reservations.

=== Springfield business loop ===
U.S. Route 60 Business
- Location: Springfield, Missouri
- Existed: 1960s–1990s

Business US 60 in Springfield connected the main route with the downtown area. US 60 followed Sunshine Street and Glenstone Avenue when Business 60 was active. It began at Sunshine Avenue and Scenic Street, heading north to College Street (an earlier alignment of US 60). The route headed east through Park Central Square, then east on St. Louis Street to Glenstone Avenue. It turned south on Glenstone to rejoin the main route at Sunshine. Over time, Business US 60 had concurrencies with U.S. Route 66 Business and Business US 166.

=== Former Owensboro bypass route ===
U.S. Route 60 Bypass
- Location: Owensboro, Kentucky

Bypass US 60 was a loop around the city of Owensboro; the main route passed through the downtown area. The road was a freeway with exit numbers. In April 2011, in conjunction with the KY Transportation Cabinet, U.S. 60 no longer passes through downtown and the former "bypass" is the main U.S. 60 route.
