= Special routes of U.S. Route 61 =

Special routes of U.S. Route 61

Highway system
- United States Numbered Highway System; List; Special; Divided

Several special routes of U.S. Route 61 exist in the states of Louisiana, Mississippi, Missouri, and Iowa.

== Louisiana ==
=== Baton Rouge bypass route ===
U.S. Highway 61 Bypass
- Location: Baton Rouge, Louisiana
- Length: 6.7 mi (10.8 km)
- Existed: c. 1941–c. 1963

U.S. Route 61 Bypass (US 61 Byp.) ran 6.7 miles (10.8 km) through Baton Rouge, the capital city of Louisiana. It followed the Airline Highway, a four-lane bypass of the downtown area constructed in 1941. The designation remained in effect until about 1963, when its route was assumed by mainline US 61.

Major intersection

The entire highway was in Baton Rouge, East Baton Rouge Parish.

mi	km	Destinations	Notes
0.0	0.0	US 61 south (Airline Highway) – New Orleans US 190 east / US 61 Bus. north / US 190 Bus. west (Florida Boulevard) – Baton Rouge, Hammond US 190 Byp. begins	Traffic circle; southern terminus of US 61 Byp.; eastern terminus of US 190 Byp.; southern end of US 190 Byp. concurrency
2.0	3.2	LA 37 (Greenwell Springs Road) – Greenwell Springs	
5.4	8.7	LA 67 (Plank Road) – Clinton	
6.7	10.8	US 61 north / US 61 Bus. south / US 190 Bus. east (Scenic Highway) – Baton Rouge, Natchez US 190 west (Airline Highway) – Opelousas US 190 Byp. ends	Interchange; northern terminus of US 61 Byp.; western terminus of US 190 Byp.; northern end of US 190 Byp. concurrency
1.000 mi = 1.609 km; 1.000 km = 0.621 mi: Concurrency terminus

=== Baton Rouge business loop ===
U.S. Highway 61 Business
- Location: Baton Rouge, Louisiana
- Length: 10.803 mi (17.386 km)
- Existed: 1954–present

U.S. Route 61 Business (US 61 Bus.) runs 10.80 miles (17.38 km) through Baton Rouge, the capital city of Louisiana. The route is entirely concurrent with US 190 Bus., forming a loop off of mainline US 61/US 190 (Airline Highway) through the downtown area. The business route was first put into effect in 1954 and assumed its current alignment in 1960.

Major intersections

The entire highway is in Baton Rouge, East Baton Rouge Parish.

mi	km	Destinations	Notes
0.000– 0.201	0.000– 0.323	US 61 / US 190 west (Airline Highway) – New Orleans, Opelousas, Natchez US 190 east (Florida Boulevard) – Hammond US 190 Bus. begins	Interchange; southern terminus of US 61 Bus.; eastern terminus of US 190 Bus.; southern end of US 190 Bus. concurrency
4.192	6.746	LA 67 (North 22nd Street)	
5.009– 5.090	8.061– 8.192	I-110 north – Metro Airport, Natchez I-110 south to I-10 east / I-12 – New Orleans, Hammond	Exit 1C on I-110; direct access limited to I-110 (north) to US 61 Bus. (south) and US 61 Bus. (both directions) to I-110 (south)
8.342	13.425	LA 3164 (Scenic Highway)	Northern terminus of LA 3164
10.756– 10.803	17.310– 17.386	US 61 north (Scenic Highway) – Scotlandville, St. Francisville US 61 south (Airline Highway) / US 190 – Opelousas, Natchez US 190 Bus. ends	Interchange; northern terminus of US 61 Bus.; western terminus of US 190 Bus.; northern end of US 190 Bus. concurrency
1.000 mi = 1.609 km; 1.000 km = 0.621 mi: Concurrency terminus

=== St. Francisville business loop ===
U.S. Highway 61 Business
- Location: St. Francisville, Louisiana
- Length: 1.729 mi (2.783 km)
- Existed: c. 1959–c. 2013

U.S. Route 61 Business (US 61 Bus.) ran 10.73 miles (17.27 km) through St. Francisville, a town in West Feliciana Parish, Louisiana. The route followed a portion of former US 61 that was bypassed by the current alignment around 1959. Like several other special routes in Louisiana, the designation was unofficial, not recognized by AASHTO or printed on the official state highway maps. It was signed along portions of LA 3057 (Commerce Street) and LA 10 (Jackson Road). Signage was removed around 2013 when new highway markers were installed following the widening of mainline US 61 to four lanes and a change in several highway designations in the area.

Major intersections

The entire highway was in St. Francisville, West Feliciana Parish.

mi	km	Destinations	Notes
0.000	0.000	US 61 – Baton Rouge, Natchez LA 3057 begins	Southern terminus of US 61 Bus. and LA 3057; southern end of LA 3057 concurrency
0.974	1.568	LA 10 west (Ferdinand Street)	Southern end of LA 10 concurrency
1.412	2.272	LA 3057 north (Commerce Street)	Northern end of LA 3057 concurrency
1.693– 1.729	2.725– 2.783	US 61 – Baton Rouge, Natchez LA 10 east – Jackson	Northern end of LA 10 concurrency
1.000 mi = 1.609 km; 1.000 km = 0.621 mi: Concurrency terminus

== Mississippi ==
=== Natchez business loop ===
U.S. Highway 61 Business
- Location: Natchez, Mississippi

US 61 BUS in Natchez, MS uses part of US 425/US 84, then turns onto Homochitto Street. US 61 BUS turns right onto South Martin Luther King Jr. Street. US 61 BUS then turns onto a pair of one way streets concurrent with former US 84 BUS (East Franklin Street northbound; Saint Cathrine Street southbound); Mississippi Highway 555 continues northward. The routes then merge into a divided highway before meeting mainline US 61/US 84.

Major intersections

The entire route is in Natchez, Adams County.

mi	km	Destinations	Notes
		US 61 / US 84 east / US 425 begins – Baton Rouge, Vicksburg	Southern terminus; south end of US 84/US 425 concurrency
		US 84 west / US 425 north / MS 928 begins – Alexandria	North end of US 84/US 425 concurrency; eastern terminus of MS 928; south end of MS 928 concurrency
		MS 928 ends	Western terminus of MS 928; north end of MS 928 concurrency
		MS 930 begins / MS 932 begins	Western terminus of MS 930/MS 932; south end of MS 930/MS 932 concurrency
		US 61 / US 84 / MS 555 north / MS 930 ends / MS 932 ends – Vicksburg, Baton Rouge	Northern terminus; southern terminus of northern segment of MS 555; eastern terminus of MS 930/MS 932; north end of MS 930/MS 932 concurrency
1.000 mi = 1.609 km; 1.000 km = 0.621 mi: Concurrency terminus

=== Vicksburg business loop ===
U.S. Highway 61 Business
- Location: Vicksburg, Mississippi
- Length: 12.3 mi (19.8 km)

U.S. Route 61 Business (US 61 Bus.) is a business route in Vicksburg, Mississippi.

Major intersections

The entire route is in Warren County.

Location	mi	km	Destinations	Notes
			US 61 – Natchez, Vicksburg	Southern terminus; no access to US 61 northbound from US 61 Bus southbound
Vicksburg			I-20 / US 80 – Jackson, Monroe	I-20 exit 1A
			US 61 – Vicksburg, Greenville	Northern terminus
1.000 mi = 1.609 km; 1.000 km = 0.621 mi: Incomplete access

== Missouri ==
=== New Madrid business spur ===
U.S. Route 61 Spur
- Location: New Madrid, Missouri
- Length: 0.495 mi (797 m)

US Route 61 Spur is a 0.495 miles (0.797 km) unsigned spur route of US 61 in New Madrid, Missouri, that runs east along Scott Street and connects Interstate 55 Business / US 61 / U.S. Route 62 (Blues Highway) with Capitol Boulevard.

=== Sikeston business loop ===
U.S. Route 61 Business
- Kingshighway
- Location: Sikeston, Missouri
- Length: 2.5 mi (4.0 km)
- Existed: Former route

U.S. Route 61 Bus. (Kingshighway) in Sikeston, Missouri, was a 2.5 miles (4.0 km) western business loop off US 61, that connected US 61 / U.S. Route 62 (US 62) with US 61.

The former business route began at a Y intersection with US 61 / US 62 (Great River Road / South Main Street / Blues Highway) in southern Sikeston (in New Madrid County), approximately two blocks north of US 61 / US 62's interchange with U.S. Route 60. Since the decommissioning of US 61 Bus, the intersection has been moved about 600 feet (180 m) to the north-northeast and changed to a T intersection. (US 61 / US 62 heads north toward US 61 Bus., Benton, and Charleston and heads south toward New Madrid.) From its southern terminus US 61 Bus. proceeded north along South Kingshighway to cross Murray Lane. (Murray Lane heads east to end at US 61 / US 62 and west to the west side of the city.)

At Murray Lane, US 61 Bus. left New Madrid County and entered Scott County. About one mile (1.6 km) along its route US 61 Bus. reached a junction with Missouri Route 114 (East Malone Ave) near the center of the city. (Route 114 [and now U.S. Route 60 Bus.] heads east towards Bertrand and Bemont and heads west towards Morehouse and Dexter.) From its junction with Route 114 S 61 Bus, continued north along North Kinghighway for a few blocks before shifting west along Tanner Street. About one and a half miles (2.4 km) beyond Route 114 US 61 Bus. reached its northern terminus at a Y intersection with US 61 in northern Sikeston. (US 61 heads north towads Benton and south towards US 62 and US 61 Bus.) Since the decommissioning of US 61 Bus, the intersection has been moved slightly southeast and changed to a T intersection.

Major intersections

The entire route is in Sikeston.

County	mi	km	Destinations	Notes
New Madrid	0.0	0.0	US 61 north / US 62 east (Great River Road / South Main St / Blues Hwy) – Benton, Charleston US 61 south / US 62 west (Great River Road / South Main St / Blues Hwy) – New Madrid	Southern terminus; Y intersection
New Madrid–Scott county line	0.4	0.64	Murray Ln east – US 61 / US 62; Murray Ln west	
Scott	1.0	1.6	Route 114 east (East Malone Ave) – Bertrand, Bement Route 114 west (East Malone Ave) – Morehouse, Dexter	
Scott	2.5	4.0	US 61 north (Great River Road / North Main St / Blues Hwy) – Benton US 61 south (Great River Road / North Main St / Blues Hwy) – US 61 Bus.	Northern terminus; Y intersection
1.000 mi = 1.609 km; 1.000 km = 0.621 mi

=== Bowling Green business loop ===
U.S. Route 61 Business
- Location: Pike County, Missouri
- Length: 4.468 mi (7.191 km)

U.S. Route 61 Bus. in Pike County, Missouri is a 4.468-mile (7.191 km) business route of US 61. It intersects with US 54 Business in Bowling Green.

=== Bowling Green business spur ===
Main Street
- Location: Bowling Green, Missouri
- Length: 0.460 mi (740 m)

US Route 61 Spur is an unsigned spur route of US 61 Business in Bowling Green, Missouri. It runs from the Bus. 61/Route Y junction to Route AA (Main Cross Street). This route is also known as Main Street.

=== New London business loop ===
U.S. Route 61 Business
- Location: New London, Missouri
- Length: 1.914 mi (3.080 km)

U.S. Route 61 Business is a two miles (3.2 km) business loop in New London, Missouri.

=== Palmyra business loop ===
U.S. Route 61 Business
- Location: Palmyra, Missouri
- Length: 3.648 mi (5.871 km)

U.S. Route 61 Business is a four miles (6.4 km) business loop in Palmyra, Missouri.

=== La Grange business loop ===
U.S. Route 61 Business
- Location: La Grange, Missouri
- Length: 4.725 mi (7.604 km)

U.S. Route 61 Business is a five-mile (8.0 km) business loop in La Grange, Missouri.

=== Canton business loop ===
U.S. Route 61 Business
- Location: Canton, Missouri
- Length: 4.938 mi (7.947 km)

U.S. Route 61 Business is a five-mile (8.0 km) business loop in Canton, Missouri.

== Iowa ==
=== Keokuk business loop ===
U.S. Highway 61 Business
- Location: Keokuk, Iowa
- Length: 5.931 mi (9.545 km)

U.S. Route 61 Business (US 61 Business) begins west of Keokuk at the eastern intersection of US 136 and US 61 just north of their crossing into Iowa from Missouri over the Des Moines River. As it travels into Keokuk, it follows US 136 and the two routes run parallel to the Mississippi River just to the south. At the southern end of downtown Keokuk, US 136 turns to the southeast to travel across the Keokuk–Hamilton Bridge to Illinois. This intersection is also the southern end of US 218. US 61 Business turns north to follow US 218 out of the city. The two routes meet up with US 61 on the northwestern end of town and the business route ends.

Major intersections

The entire route is in Keokuk, Lee County.

mi	km	Destinations	Notes
0.000	0.000	US 136 west / US 61 – Fort Madison	Southern end of US 136 overlap
2.451	3.945	US 136 east / US 218 begins (Main Street)	Northern end of US 136 overlap; southern end of US 218 overlap
5.931	9.545	US 61 north / US 218 north – Fort Madison	Northern end of US 218 overlap
1.000 mi = 1.609 km; 1.000 km = 0.621 mi: Concurrency terminus

=== Fort Madison business loop ===
U.S. Highway 61 Business
- Location: Fort Madison, Iowa
- Length: 9.075 mi (14.605 km)
- Existed: 2012–present

U.S. Route 61 Business was created through Fort Madison, Iowa, along the former routing of US 61. The main route was rerouted around town along a new four-lane bypass in 2012. It begins at the interchange with Iowa Highway 2 (Iowa 2) west of Fort Madison. The two routes run east together into town. Iowa 2 splits away to cross the river near downtown and the route turns north and heads out of town. It ends at another interchange with US 61 northeast of town. From 2011 to 2013, the portion of highway north of Iowa 2 was known officially as Iowa 961, but it was not signed as such.

Major intersections

The entire route is in Lee County.

Location	mi	km	Destinations	Notes
Jefferson Township	0.000	0.000	US 61 / Iowa 2 / Mormon Pioneer National Historic Trail – Keokuk, Burlington	
Fort Madison	3.906	6.286	18th Street	Formerly Iowa 103
Fort Madison	4.199	6.758	15th Street	Formerly Iowa 88
Fort Madison	5.462	8.790	To IL 9 / IL 96 / Mormon Pioneer National Historic Trail	Former end of Iowa 2
Washington Township	9.075	14.605	US 61 – Burlington, Keokuk	
1.000 mi = 1.609 km; 1.000 km = 0.621 mi

=== Muscatine business loop ===
U.S. Highway 61 Business
- Location: Muscatine, Iowa
- Length: 5.407 mi (8.702 km)
- Existed: 1984–present

U.S. Route 61 Business was created in 1984 after U.S. Highway 61 (US 61) was rerouted around Muscatine on a new four-lane bypass. It begins on the southern edge of Muscatine at the intersection of US 61 and Iowa Highway 92 (Iowa 92). US 61 Business heads north through Muscatine's industrial area and into the downtown riverfront. It is joined by Iowa 38 and Iowa 92 at an intersection near the foot of the Norbert F. Beckey Bridge. The intersection marks the southern end of Iowa 38 while Iowa 92 crosses the bridge into Illinois. A few blocks later, the three routes are joined by Iowa 22. All four routes continue north for a mile before meeting US 61.

Major intersections

The entire route is in Muscatine, Muscatine County.

mi	km	Destinations	Notes
0.000	0.000	US 61 / Iowa 92 / Great River Road south – Wapello, Columbus Junction	
3.209	5.164	Cedar Street	Former western Iowa 22 junction
3.781	6.085	Iowa 38 begins / Iowa 92 east	Southern end of Iowa 38 and Iowa 92 overlaps
4.498	7.239	Iowa 22 east / Great River Road north (Washington Street)	Northern end of Great River Road overlap; southern end of Iowa 22 overlap
5.407	8.702	US 61 / Iowa 22 west / Iowa 92 west – Blue Grass, Wapello Iowa 38 north – Wilton	Northern end of Iowa 22 and Iowa 92 overlaps
1.000 mi = 1.609 km; 1.000 km = 0.621 mi: Concurrency terminus

=== Davenport business loop ===
U.S. Highway 61 Business
- Location: Davenport, Iowa
- Length: 10.924 mi (17.580 km)
- Existed: 2010–present

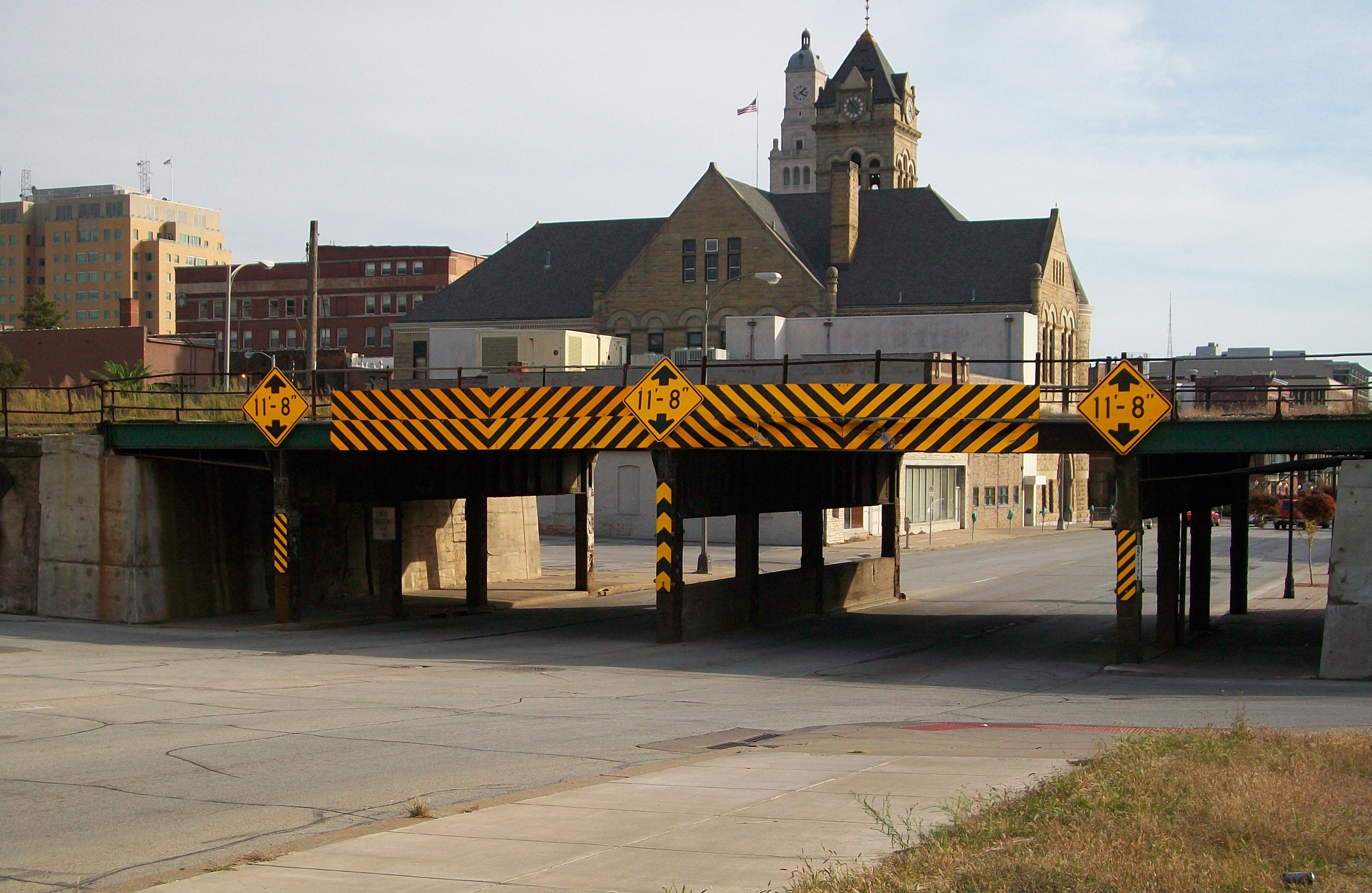
This low bridge was one of reasons US 61 relocated onto the interstates around Davenport

U.S. Route 61 Business was created in 2010 when U.S. Route 61 was rerouted around Davenport on I-280 and I-80. The route begins on the southwestern end of town at the interchange with I-280. From there, it heads towards the Mississippi River along River Drive. For six blocks, US 61 Bus. is overlapped by US 67, which joins from the south at the Centennial Bridge and parts to the north when US 61 Bus. turns off. Most of the remaining route through Davenport runs along two one-way streets: Brady Street (northbound) and Harrison Street (southbound). Near 5th Street in downtown Davenport, the Iowa Interstate Railroad crosses over Brady and Harrison streets. The vertical clearance of both bridges is only 11 feet 8 inches (3.56 m), which causes many trucks that attempt to pass beneath the bridge to hit or become stuck. This bridge was a major factor in US 61's realignment. Just south of Kimberly Road, which carries US 6, the southbound lanes of US 61 Bus. turn onto Harrison Street from Welcome Way. North of 53rd Street, the two directions rejoin as one road. The route ends at the I-80 interchange on the northern side of town. The entire route is inventoried as Iowa Highway 461, but it not signed as such.

Major intersections

The entire route is in Davenport, Scott County.

mi	km	Destinations	Notes
0.000	0.000	I-280 / US 61 to I-80	
1.641	2.641	Iowa 22 west / Great River Road south – Buffalo	Southern end of Great River Road overlap
5.435	8.747	US 67 south (Centennial Bridge)	Southern end of US 67 overlap
5.611	9.030	US 67 north / Great River Road north (River Drive)	Northern end of US 67 and Great River Road overlap
8.412	13.538	US 6 (Kimberly Road)	
10.924	17.580	I-80 / US 61	
1.000 mi = 1.609 km; 1.000 km = 0.621 mi: Concurrency terminus

=== Maquoketa, Iowa, business route ===
U.S. Highway 61 Business
- Location: Maquoketa, Iowa
- Length: 2.55 mi (4.10 km)
- Existed: 1998–present

The business route through Maquoketa follows Main Street through the downtown business district, and Iowa Highway 64 along Platt Street. The route is unsigned, aside from a few circle "City Route 61" signs along Main Street.

Although not designated until 1998, Main Street had essentially served as a "Business 61" since at least the mid-1970s, when U.S. 61 was moved to a two-lane bypass around the south and west parts of the city. The bypass was widened to four-lane freeway in the summer of 1996, as part of a massive four-lane project of U.S. 61 between Dubuque and De Witt.

Major intersections

The entire route is in Maquoketa, Jackson County.

mi	km	Destinations	Notes
0.00	0.00	US 61 – Dubuque, Davenport	
1.66	2.67	Iowa 64 east – Preston	Southern end of Iowa 64 overlap
2.55	4.10	US 61 / Iowa 64 west – Dubuque, Anamosa, Davenport	Northern end of Iowa 64 overlap
1.000 mi = 1.609 km; 1.000 km = 0.621 mi: Concurrency terminus

== See also ==
- List of special routes of the United States Numbered Highway System
