= Clifty Creek =

Clifty Creek may refer to:

- Clifty Creek (Big Berger Creek), stream in Missouri
- Clifty Creek (North Fork River), stream in Missouri
- Clifty Creek, in Clifty Falls State Park, Indiana

== See also ==
- Clifty Fork
