= Browns, Missouri =

Browns, Missouri may refer to:

- Browns, Boone County, Missouri, an unincorporated community
- Browns, Scott County, Missouri, an unincorporated community

== See also ==
- Browns (disambiguation)#Places
