= Relfe, Missouri =

Extinct town in the American state of Missouri

Coordinates: 37°43′01″N 91°58′56″W

Relfe is an extinct town in western Phelps County, in the U.S. state of Missouri. The GNIS classifies it as a populated place.

The community lies on Spring Creek approximately four miles southeast of Spring Creek's confluence with the Big Piney River. The spring for which it was named lies roughly one quarter of a mile to the southeast and the Relfe School was located approximately one quarter mile to the northwest along the northeast margin of the Spring Creek floodplain.

A post office called Relfe was established in 1866, and remained in operation until 1928. The community has the name of an early area politician.
