= Mississippi Highway 555 =

Highway in Mississippi

Mississippi Highway 555
- Sections of MS 555 in Adams County: Southern section is highlighted in red, northern section in green

Route information
- Maintained by MDOT and Adams County
- Length: 15.307 mi (24.634 km)
- Existed: 1957–present

Southern segment
- Length: 3.70 mi (5.95 km)
- South end: Odgen Road near Kingston
- North end: US 61 near Cloverdale

Northern segment
- Length: 11.60 mi (18.67 km)
- South end: US 61 / US 84 / MS 930 / MS 932 in Natchez
- North end: Anna's Bottom Road near Anna site

Location
- Country: United States
- State: Mississippi
- Counties: Adams

Highway system
- Mississippi State Highway System; Interstate; US; State
← MS 554	→ MS 556

Mississippi Highway 555 (MS 555) is a state highway in southwestern Mississippi. The route has two sections, both in Adams County. The first section starts at Ogden Road and travels northwestward to its terminus at US 61. The second section starts at the concurrency of MS 930 and MS 932 and the concurrency of US 61 and US 84 in Natchez. MS 555 travels northward through Pine Ridge and ends at Anna's Bottom Road near the Anna site. The route travels by a few historical locations, including the Pine Ridge Presbyterian Church.

The route was designated in 1957, from Natchez to northern Adams County. An additional section from southern Adams County to Wilkinson County was added in 1960, but it was removed by 1967.

== Route description ==
Traffic volume on Mississippi Highway 555
Location	Volume
South of St. Mark Road	1,300
Northwest of Greenfield Road	1,500
South of Northview Drive	14,000
North of Old Washington Road	14,000
North of Ivy Lane	7,900
North of Old Country Club Road	7,900
South of Steam Plant Road	3,700
North of Grafton Heights Road	2,200
North of Bisland Road	1,100
South of Stowers Road	190
Data was measured in 2015 in terms of AADT; Source:

Both sections of the route is located in Adams County. MS 555 is legally defined in Mississippi Code § 65-3-3, as part of the state highway system. MDOT maintains the section from MS 930/932 and US 61/84 to MS 554, and Adams County maintains all other sections.

The southern section of MS 555 starts at the intersection of Ogden Road and Kingston Road, northwest of the unincorporated area of Kingston. The route travels northwestward along Kingston Road, crossing over Sharp Bayou. Continuing through the forest, the road crosses over Second Creek and intersects Greenfield Road. MS 555 then turns westward, passing by the Cherry Grove Plantation, and it ends at US 61 at a T-intersection.

The northern section of the route starts at the intersection of D'Evereux Drive (MS 930/932) and Prentiss Drive (US 61/84) in suburban Natchez. MS 555 then travels northwestward to its intersection with Dr. Martin Luther King Jr. Street and turns northward. The road intersects multiple driveways, leaving Natchez as Dr. Martin Luther King Street. The route enters into a forested area, and it travels northeastward at Pineview Drive. It intersects MS 554 at Pine Ridge, where the Pine Ridge Presbyterian Church is located. The road passes by Mount Repose soon after. MS 555 continues through rural Adams County until its intersection with Church Hill Road. The road turns northwest toward the Anna site. After traveling through a dense forest, MS 555 intersects Quitman Road and continues on a gravel road. Past the intersection at Thornburg Lake Road, the route ends at the legally defined terminus at the old Pine Ridge School. The road continues eastward as Anna's Bottom Road.

== History ==
In 1955, a road from Natchez to Selma was constructed. MS 555 was designated two years later, after a new road was created, connecting from Natchez to northern Adams County. In 1960, the route was extended along a gravel road to the Adams–Jefferson county line. Two years later, the southern segments of MS 554, which extended from MS 563 in Wilkinson County to US 61 in Adams County, was renumbered to MS 555. The southern segment was removed from the 1967 map. The gravel section of the northern segment was also removed. The southern reappeared on the 1974 map, but no longer state maintained, along with the segment north of MS 554. In 1998, the northern segment was truncated to Church Hill Road, but the legally designated terminus remain unchanged.

== Major intersections ==
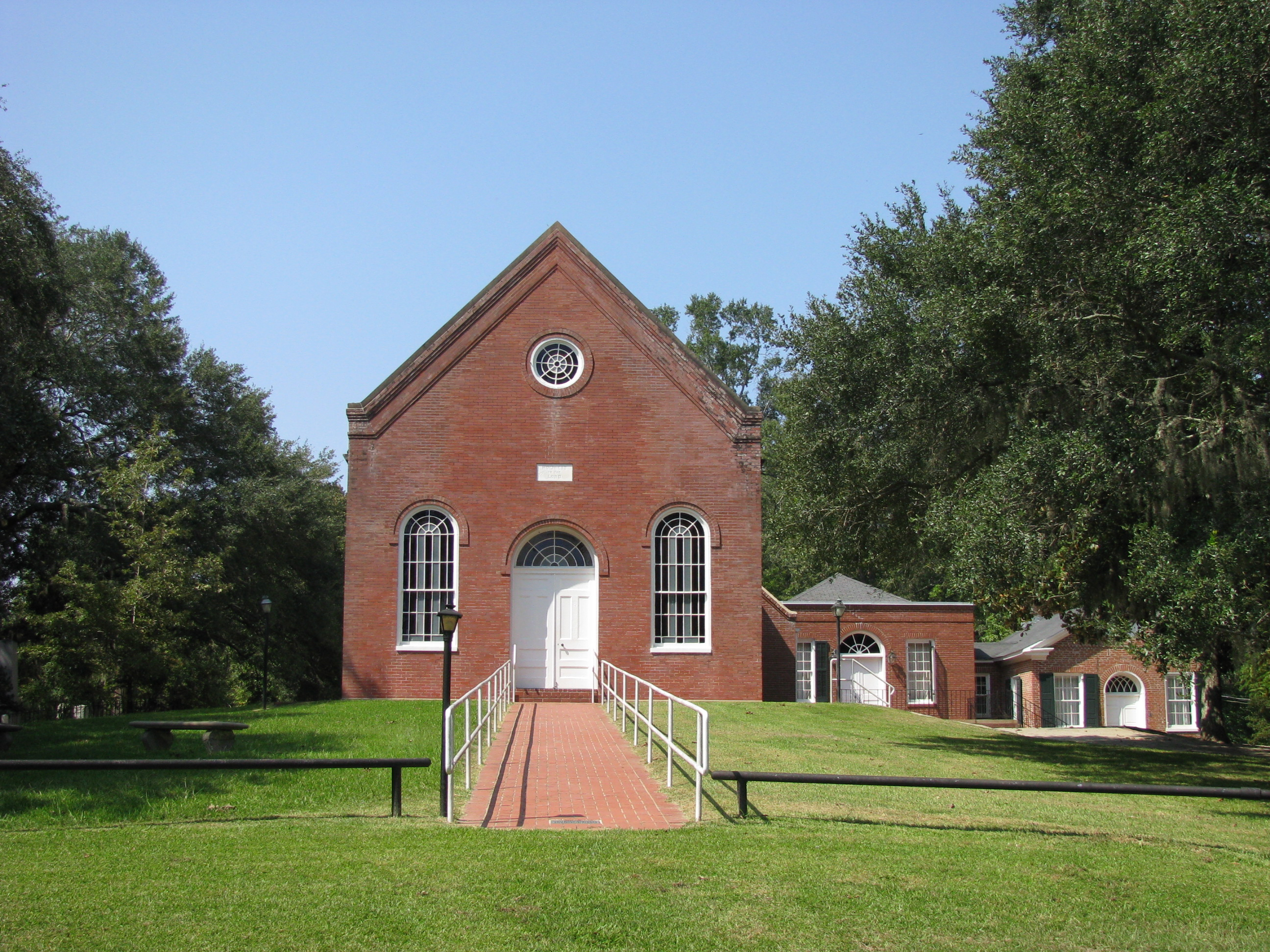
Pine Ridge Presbyterian Church, located on MS 555

The entire route is in Adams County.

Location		km	Destinations	Notes
	0.0	0.0	Odgen Road	Southern terminus
	3.7	6.0	US 61	Northern terminus of southern segment
Gap in route
Natchez	3.7	6.0	US 61 / US 84 (Prentiss Drive) / MS 930 west / MS 932 west (D'Evereux Drive)	Southern terminus of northern segment
Pine Ridge	9.4	15.1	MS 554 east (Airport Road) – Natchez-Adams County Airport	Western terminus of MS 554
Anna site	15.3	24.6	Anna's Bottom Road	Northern terminus
1.000 mi = 1.609 km; 1.000 km = 0.621 mi
