= Mississippi Highway 554 =

Highway in Mississippi

Mississippi Highway 554
- Airport Road

Route information
- Maintained by MDOT and Adams County
- Length: 5.628 mi (9.057 km)
- Existed: 1957 – 1967; 1973–present

Major junctions
- West end: MS 555 near Natchez
- East end: US 61 in Selma

Location
- Country: United States
- State: Mississippi
- Counties: Adams

Highway system
- Mississippi State Highway System; Interstate; US; State
← MS 553	→ MS 555

Mississippi Highway 554 (MS 554) is a short highway near Natchez, Mississippi. The route starts at MS 555, and travels eastward. The road intersects the entrance to Natchez–Adams County Airport before ending at U.S. Route 61 (US 61). The route was designated in 1957, and it included a separate route in southern Adams County (now part of MS 555). MS 554 was temporarily removed from the highway system in 1967, but was added back in 1973.

== Route description ==
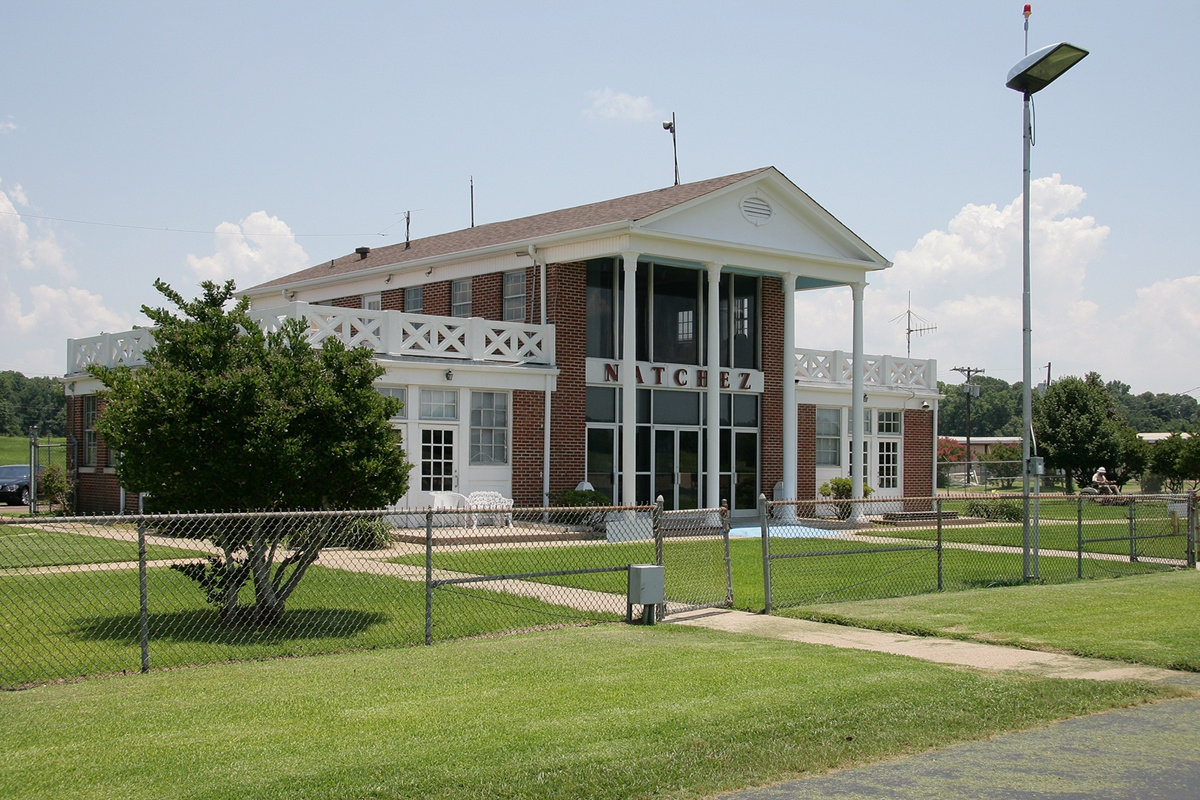
Natchez–Adams County Airport

All of the route is located in Adams County. MS 554 starts at MS 555 in the unincorporated village of Pine Ridge. The route travels eastward along Airport Road into the forest. It curves around multiple hills, until it reaches Old Johnson Road. MS 554 then travels around the airport. The road intersects the entrance to the airport at a T-intersection. Local maintenance ends, and state maintenance begins. The route continues traveling east until it reaches its eastern terminus at US 61. The road continues on as Selma Road.

In 2013, Mississippi Department of Transportation (MDOT) calculated as many as 500 vehicles traveling west of Howard Loop, and as few as 290 vehicles traveling west of Old Meadow Road. All of the road is maintained by MDOT and Adams County. MS 554 is not included as a part of the National Highway System (NHS), a network of highways identified as being most important for the economy, mobility and defense of the nation.

== History ==
A road from Natchez to north of Selma first appeared on maps in 1955. MS 554 was designated in 1957, from US 61 and US 65, to an area north of the Adams–Wilkinson county line. The designation was also added to the road from MS 555 to US 61 in 1958. By 1960, the southern segment of MS 554 was extended along a locally maintained gravel road to MS 563 in Wilkinson County. Two years later, the southern segment was renumbered, and it became part of MS 555. The northern segment kept its designation as MS 554. MS 554 was removed from state highway maps in 1967, and didn't reappear until 1973. The western part of the road was no longer state maintained by 1998.

== Major intersections ==
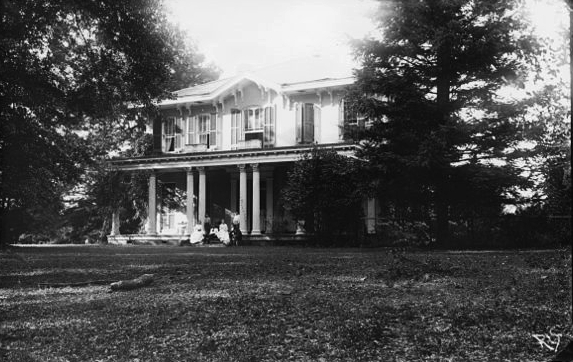
Edgewood, located on MS 554

The entire route is in Adams County.

Location	mi	km	Destinations	Notes
Pine Ridge	0.000	0.000	MS 555 (M.L.K. Jr Road) / Foster Mound Road	Western terminus
	4.427	7.125	Natchez–Adams County Airport	Begin local maintenance
Selma	5.628	9.057	US 61 / Winding Creek Road – Natchez, Vicksburg	Eastern terminus
1.000 mi = 1.609 km; 1.000 km = 0.621 mi
