= Raftville, Missouri =

Extinct town in the American state of Missouri

Coordinates: 37°27′27″N 91°59′25″W

Raftville is an extinct town in Texas County, in the U.S. state of Missouri. The community was located on the west side of the Big Piney River, south of Boiling Spring.

A post office called Raftville was established in 1916, and remained in operation until 1933. The community was the launch point of log drives, hence the name.
