= Frederick DeField =

American politician

Member of the U.S. House of Representatives from Missouri's 160th district

Missouri House of Representatives
- In office 1969–1981

Personal details
- Born: 1925 Bertrand, Missouri
- Died: 2015 (aged 89–90) Sikeston, Missouri
- Resting place: I.O.O.F. Cemetery near Charleston
- Party: Democratic
- Spouse: Dorothy Bryant
- Children: 3 (2 sons, 1 daughter)
- Occupation: cattle farmer

Frederick W. "Fred" DeField (June 1, 1925 - December 14, 2015) was a Democratic politician who served in the Missouri House of Representatives and as a Mississippi County court judge.
