= St. Louis Browns (disambiguation) =

St. Louis Browns or St. Louis Brown Stockings may refer to any of four different American baseball teams:

- St. Louis Brown Stockings, two separate teams, one existing 1875–1877 and one existing 1878–1881
- St. Louis Cardinals, American Association and National League franchise existing 1882–present, called St. Louis Brown Stockings in 1882 and St. Louis Browns 1883–1898
- St. Louis Browns, 1902–1953 St. Louis incarnation of an American League franchise existing 1901–present, called Milwaukee Brewers in 1901 and Baltimore Orioles since 1954

== See also ==
- St. Louis (NA), exposition on how the two St. Louis National Association teams (one named St. Louis Browns) are denoted and differentiated
- Browns (disambiguation)
