= Hazleton, Missouri =

Extinct town in the U.S. state of Missouri

Coordinates: 37°31′30″N 92°01′30″W

Hazleton is an extinct town in Texas County, in the U.S. state of Missouri. The GNIS classifies it as a populated place. The village is on the bank of the Big Piney River within the Mark Twain National Forest.

A post office called Hazleton was established in 1890, and remained in operation until 1944. The community has the name of J. Hazleton, proprietor of a local mill.

== Notable person ==
- Mel Stottlemyre, a pitcher and later a pitching coach for the New York Yankees. He won 164 games for them as a pitcher from 1964 to 1974, with three 20-win seasons, and was born in Hazleton.
