= Spring Creek (Big Piney River tributary) =

Stream in the U.S. state of Missouri

Spring Creek is a stream in Texas and Phelps counties in the Ozarks of southern Missouri. It is a tributary to the Big Piney River.

The stream headwaters arise in northern Texas County at 37°30′22″N 91°49′31″W approximately one mile east of Licking and just north of Missouri Route 32. The stream flows to the west through Licking passes under US Route 63 and turns to the northwest. The stream flows to the northwest passing east of the community of Kinderpost. It enters Phelps County and flows north passing to the west of Beulah and gains the tributary of Sherrill Creek. The stream flows past the community of Spring Creek to its confluence in western Phelps County at 37°46′05″N 92°01′08″W just east of the Phelps-Pulaski county line.
