= Kinderpost, Missouri =

Unincorporated community in Missouri, U.S.

Coordinates: 37°34′23″N 91°56′42″W

Kinderpost is an unincorporated community in northern Texas County, in the U.S. state of Missouri. The community is located on Missouri Route AT approximately 6.5 miles northwest of Licking. Spring Creek flows past to the east of the community.

== History ==
A post office called Kinderpost was established in 1906, and remained in operation until 1954. The community was named from the German word meaning "children", since the founder was fond of children.
