= Browns =

Browns may refer to:

- Shades of brown of the color brown

== Places ==
In the United States

- Browns, Alabama, an unincorporated community
- Browns, Illinois, a village
- Browns, Boone County, Missouri, an unincorporated community
- Browns, Scott County, Missouri, an unincorporated community
- Browns, Ohio, an unincorporated community
- Browns Lake (disambiguation)

Elsewhere

- Browns, New Zealand, a village in New Zealand's Southland Region

== Sports ==
- Cleveland Browns, a National Football League team based in Cleveland, Ohio
- Cleveland Browns (baseball), a Negro league baseball team
- St. Louis Browns, a former Major League Baseball team now known as the Baltimore Orioles
- Enterprise Browns, defunct Minor league baseball team

== Other ==
- Browns (fashion boutique), a shop in Mayfair, London
- Browns of Chester, a department store in Chester, England
- Browns of York, a department store in York, England
- The Browns, a country music group of the 1950s and '60s
- The 5 Browns, a piano quintet of 5 siblings
- Satyrinae, a subfamily of butterflies commonly called the browns
- Edward and Elaine Brown, tax protesters
- The Browns, a comedy web series starring Tammie Brown
- Brown people

== See also ==
- Brown (disambiguation)
- Browning (disambiguation)
