= Prior, Missouri =

Unincorporated community in Missouri, U.S.

Coordinates: 37°00′08″N 92°18′06″W

Prior is an unincorporated community in Douglas County, Missouri, United States. The community is located on Missouri Route 95, just north of the intersection with Missouri Route 76 and 2.5 miles north of Vanzant. The community sits on a ridge between Fox Creek to the west and Clifty Creek to the east, at an elevation of 1,243 ft (379 m).

== History ==
A post office called Prior was established in 1894, and remained in operation until 1939. The community was named after an early settler.
