= Spring Creek, Missouri =

Extinct town in the American state of Missouri

Coordinates: 37°45′45″N 92°01′27″W

Spring Creek is an extinct town in Phelps County, in the U.S. state of Missouri. The GNIS classifies it as a populated place. The community is on the southwest side of the confluence of Spring Creek and the Big Piney River. The site is on the Phelps-Pulaski county line. The Wayman/Pillman cemetery is west of the county line in Pulaski County. The boundary of Fort Leonard Wood is two miles to the west, along Missouri Route J, which passes through the community.

== History ==
A post office called Spring Creek was established in 1868, and remained in operation until 1943. The community took its name from nearby Spring Creek.
