= Pinhook, Missouri =

- Inactive Village
- Location in Mississippi County and the state of Missouri
- Coordinates: 36°44′21″N 89°16′4″W
- Country: United States
- State: Missouri
- County: Mississippi
- Incorporated: February 23, 1995

Area
  - Total: 0.14 sq mi (0.37 km^{2})
  - Land: 0.14 sq mi (0.37 km^{2})
  - Water: 0 sq mi (0.00 km^{2})
- Elevation: 302 ft (92 m)

Population (2020)
  - Total: 6
  - Density: 42/sq mi (16.3/km^{2})
- Time zone: UTC-6 (Central (CST))
  - Summer (DST): UTC-5 (CDT)
- FIPS code: 29-57926
- GNIS feature ID: 2399677

Pinhook is an inactive village in Mississippi County, Missouri, United States. The population was 6 at the 2020 census, down from 30 in 2010.

== History ==
It was settled in the 1920s or 1930s by sharecroppers. The community takes its name from a nearby ridge of the same name which in turn was so named on account it having the form of a pinhook. This largely African American community expanded to nearly 250 people at its peak.

The community was flooded in May 2011 when the U.S. Army Corps of Engineers breached the Bird's Point Levee to save the town of Cairo, Illinois. The government did not assist or provide help to evacuate Pinhook. The residents were left entirely on their own before the levee breach. Afterwards, the former residents resettled in East Prairie and Sikeston. In August 2015 the remaining buildings in Pinhook were bulldozed.

== Geography ==
Pinhook is located in southern Mississippi County at 36°44′21″N 89°16′4″W (36.739225, -89.267693). It is 9 miles (14 km) by road southeast of East Prairie and 16 miles (26 km) south of Charleston, the county seat. The winding Mississippi River is 6 miles (10 km) to the east and 7 miles (11 km) to the southwest.

According to the U.S. Census Bureau, the village has a total area of 0.14 square miles (0.36 km^{2}), all land.

== Demographics ==
Historical population
Census	Pop.	Note	%±
2000	48		—
2010	30		−37.5%
2020	6		−80.0%
U.S. Decennial Census; 2010 2020

=== 2020 census ===
Pinhook village, Missouri – Racial and ethnic composition Note: the US Census treats Hispanic/Latino as an ethnic category. This table excludes Latinos from the racial categories and assigns them to a separate category. Hispanics/Latinos may be of any race.
Race / Ethnicity (NH = Non-Hispanic)	Pop 2000	Pop 2010	Pop 2020	% 2000	% 2010	% 2020
White alone (NH)	5	1	0	10.42%	3.33%	0.00%
Black or African American alone (NH)	42	29	3	87.50%	96.67%	50.00%
Native American or Alaska Native alone (NH)	0	0	0	0.00%	0.00%	0.00%
Asian alone (NH)	0	0	0	0.00%	0.00%	0.00%
Pacific Islander alone (NH)	0	0	0	0.00%	0.00%	0.00%
Other race alone (NH)	0	0	0	0.00%	0.00%	0.00%
Mixed race or Multiracial (NH)	1	0	0	2.08%	0.00%	0.00%
Hispanic or Latino (any race)	0	0	3	0.00%	0.00%	50.00%
Total	48	30	6	100.00%	100.00%	100.00%

=== 2010 census ===
As of the census of 2010, there were 30 people, 17 households, and 8 families residing in the village. The population density was 214.3 inhabitants per square mile (82.7/km^{2}). There were 19 housing units at an average density of 135.7 per square mile (52.4/km^{2}). The racial makeup of the village was 3.33% White and 96.67% Black or African American.

There were 17 households, of which 11.8% had children under the age of 18 living with them, 29.4% were married couples living together, 11.8% had a female householder with no husband present, 5.9% had a male householder with no wife present, and 52.9% were non-families. 52.9% of all households were made up of individuals, and 17.6% had someone living alone who was 65 years of age or older. The average household size was 1.76 and the average family size was 2.63.

The median age in the village was 54 years. 10% of residents were under the age of 18; 6.7% were between the ages of 18 and 24; 10% were from 25 to 44; 39.9% were from 45 to 64; and 33.3% were 65 years of age or older. The gender makeup of the village was 50.0% male and 50.0% female.

=== 2000 census ===
As of the census of 2000, there were 48 people, 20 households, and 15 families residing in the village. The population density was 336.1 inhabitants per square mile (129.8/km^{2}). There were 21 housing units at an average density of 147.0 per square mile (56.8/km^{2}). The racial makeup of the village was 10.42% White, 87.50% African American, and 2.08% from two or more races.

There were 20 households, out of which 35.0% had children under the age of 18 living with them, 40.0% were married couples living together, 35.0% had a female householder with no husband present, and 25.0% were non-families. 25.0% of all households were made up of individuals, and 10.0% had someone living alone who was 65 years of age or older. The average household size was 2.40 and the average family size was 2.87.

In the village, the population was spread out, with 29.2% under the age of 18, 6.3% from 18 to 24, 29.2% from 25 to 44, 18.8% from 45 to 64, and 16.7% who were 65 years of age or older. The median age was 38 years. For every 100 females, there were 71.4 males. For every 100 females age 18 and over, there were 70.0 males.

The median income for a household in the village was $15,417, and the median income for a family was $16,250. Males had a median income of $23,750 versus $16,250 for females. The per capita income for the village was $10,114. There were 47.1% of families and 55.4% of the population living below the poverty line, including 50.0% of under eighteens and 83.3% of those over 64.

== Education ==
It is in the East Prairie R-II School District.
