= Pine Ridge Presbyterian Church =

Historic church in Mississippi, United States

- Pine Ridge Church
- U.S. National Register of Historic Places
- Location within Mississippi Location within the United States
- Nearest city: Natchez, Mississippi
- Coordinates: 31°37′51″N 91°20′57″W
- Area: 5.7 acres (2.3 ha)
- Built: 1829
- Architectural style: Colonial Revival, Federal
- NRHP reference No.: 79001296
- Added to NRHP: December 13, 1979

Pine Ridge Church (Pine Ridge Presbyterian Church) is a historic church in Pine Ridge, Mississippi, north of Natchez.

The church was started by the Evangelist Rev James Smylie in 1807 as the Washington Presbyterian Church. Washington was that time the Territorial Capital of the old Southwest territory. In 1808 the church moved to a rural community and the name changed to Salem Church. It is the oldest Presbyterian congregation in Mississippi. In 1827 the name was changed to Pine Ridge Presbyterian Church. It was built in 1829 and added to the National Register of Historic Places in 1979. In 1908 a tornado destroyed the first building. Pine Ridge is a member of the Presbyterian Church in America.
