= U.S. Route 61/190 Business =

Business route in Louisiana, United States

U.S. Highway 61/190 Business
- Florida Boulevard, Scenic Highway

Route information
- Maintained by Louisiana DOTD
- Length: 10.8 mi (17.4 km)
- Existed: 1960–present

Major junctions
- Southeast end: US 61 / US 190 towards Hammond and New Orleans
- I-110 in Baton Rouge
- Northwest end: US 61 / US 190 towards Opelousas and Scotlandville

Location
- Country: United States
- State: Louisiana
- Parishes: East Baton Rouge

Highway system
- United States Numbered Highway System; List; Special; Divided; Louisiana State Highway System; Interstate; US; State; Scenic

U.S. Highway 61/190 Business (internally designated as U.S. Highway 61-X) is a business route of both U.S. Route 61 and U.S. Route 190 in Louisiana that serves as a boulevard into downtown Baton Rouge. It spans 10.89 miles (17.53 km) in a southeast to northwest direction and it is signposted as Business 61/190, generally without directional shields. It follows parts of the former alignment of US 61/190 through Baton Rouge, which existed in downtown Baton Rouge from 1935 until 1960.

== Route description ==
From the southeast, US 61/190 Business begins at a cloverleaf intersection near the former Cortana Mall. It travels in a western direction along a six-lane highway known as Florida Boulevard, passing through a primarily commercial area. After passing Baton Rouge Community College and Baton Rouge General Medical Center, US 61/190 Business transitions from six to four lanes after passing Foster Street. The route begins to transition into a residential area. After a few miles, US 61/190 Business intersects I-110 at exit 1C; motorists can only exit to southbound I-110 from US 61/190 Business and motorists exiting onto US 61/190 Business can only to so from northbound I-110. In addition, despite not being marked on I-110, exit 1C only gives access to eastbound US 61/190 Business with downtown traffic being directed to turn onto North 10th Street. US 61/190 Business then enters downtown Baton Rouge past its junction with I-110. Traversing through downtown, the road turns north at River Road. This intersection was the terminus of the original Baton Rouge-Port Allen ferry, which at one time carried the Jefferson Highway, US 71, and the original, pre-bypass alignment of US 190 over the Mississippi River.

After turning north, US 61/190 Business follows the Mississippi River for a short time, passing the Louisiana State Capitol to the west by one block. After turning a slight right and merging onto North 3rd Street, US 61/190 Business passes ExxonMobil's Baton Rouge Refinery. The route then curves to the east, turning into Chippewa Street. At US 61/190 Business' intersection with Louisiana Highway 3164 (LA 3164), it turns north onto Scenic Highway continuing through a mix of industrial and residential areas. US 61/190 Business ends at a widened cloverleaf interchange with its mainline routes. US 61 takes over Scenic Highway, heading north towards Natchez while US 190 continues west towards the Huey P. Long Bridge and Opelousas.

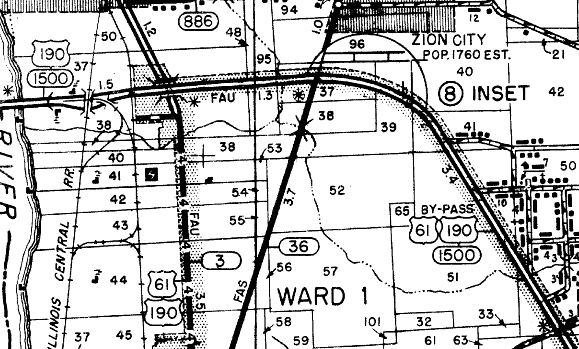
A clipping of a map showing the former alignment of US 61/190 along Scenic Highway while the current alignment of US 61/190 shown as Bypass US 61/190.

== History ==
US 61/190 Business was originally only US 61, with US 71 (the original US 190 in Port Allen) ending at the ferry landing, and State Route 7 (the old US 190) following US 61 along Government Street and then onto Jefferson Highway (current LA 73). State Route 7 turned east at the intersection with Old Hammond Highway towards Denham Springs. US 61 followed Jefferson Highway, also signed as State Route 1.

When the US 61/190 Bypass was built around Baton Rouge, a traffic circle existed at the current cloverleaf intersection that defines the southern terminus of US 61/190 Business. State Route 7 was realigned onto Florida Boulevard, with the old route (Old Hammond Highway) being redesignated as State Route 7D.

== Future ==
In May 2019, the Louisiana Department of Transportation and Development (LaDOTD) petitioned the American Association of State Highway and Transportation Officials (AASHTO) to reroute US 61/190 Business from its interchange with I-110 to the intersection of Chippewa Street and Scenic Highway, including the section through Baton Rouge, onto I-110 itself. AASHTO approved the route relocation contingently, questioning if a business route should be relocated onto an interstate or if the business route should be deleted between the two interstate intersections. As of December 2020, all Louisiana documents point to US 61/190 running on the pre-2019 alignment, with the exception of internal routings which show that the portion of Florida Street between I-110 and River Road having been transferred back to the City of Baton Rouge. Additionally, the application from LaDOTD to AASHTO mentioned that existing parts of the business route would be transferred in sections over time. Similarly, an extension of Interstate 49 was approved at the same meeting and has not been signed as such as of June 2019.

== Junction list ==
The entire highway is in Baton Rouge, East Baton Rouge Parish.

mi	km	Destinations	Notes
0.0	0.0	US 61 / US 190 – Hammond, Natchez, Opelousas, New Orleans	Southern terminus, Bus. US 61/190 continues east as US 190
5.0	8.0	I-110 / 10th Street, T. J. Jemison Boulevard	Exit 1C; northbound exit from and southbound entrance to I-110
8.3	13.4	LA 3164 south (Scenic Highway)	
10.8	17.4	US 61 / US 190 – St. Francisville, Natchez	Northern terminus; Bus. US 61/190 continues north as US 61
1.000 mi = 1.609 km; 1.000 km = 0.621 mi: Incomplete access
