= Clifty Creek (Big Berger Creek tributary) =

Stream in the U.S. state of Missouri

Clifty Creek is a stream in Gasconade County in the U.S. state of Missouri. It is a tributary of the Big Berger Creek.

The stream headwaters arise at 38°32′02″N 91°25′54″W adjacent to the north side of Missouri Route E and it flows to the northeast for approximately three miles to its confluence with Big Berger Creek just after passing under Missouri Route H one mile west of the Gasconade-Franklin county line at 38°33′33″N 91°23′04″W.

Clifty Creek was so named due to the cliffs along its course.

== See also ==
- List of rivers of Missouri
