= Browns, Scott County, Missouri =

Unincorporated community in Scott County, Missouri, United States

Coordinates: 36°51′45″N 89°37′58″W

Browns is an unincorporated community in Scott County, Missouri, United States. The junction of U.S. Route 60 Business, Missouri Route 114, and Route BB is in Browns.

== History ==
Browns was founded in the 1910s and once known as Brown's Spur, being named after a canal building supervisor who had a railway spur built at the location to aid in the delivery of materials.
