= Clifty Fork =

Stream in Pike County, Missouri, U.S.

Coordinates: 39.3947653°N 91.3904287°W

Clifty Fork is a stream in Pike County in the U.S. state of Missouri. It is a tributary of South Spencer Creek.

Clifty Fork was named on account of its steep banks.

== See also ==
- List of rivers of Missouri
