= Natchez–Adams County Airport =

Natchez–Adams County Airport Hardy–Anders Field
- IATA: HEZ; ICAO: KHEZ; FAA LID: HEZ

Summary
- Airport type: Public
- Owner: Adams County
- Serves: Natchez, Mississippi
- Elevation AMSL: 272 ft (83 m)
- Coordinates: 31°36′49″N 091°17′50″W
- Website: https://www.flynatchez.com
- Interactive map of Natchez–Adams County Airport

Runways
Direction	Length		Surface
Direction	ft	m	Surface
13/31	6,500	1,981	Asphalt
18/36	5,000	1,524	Asphalt

Statistics (2021)
- Aircraft operations (year ending July 31, 2021): 15,142
- Based aircraft: 24
- Source: Federal Aviation Administration

Natchez–Adams County Airport (IATA: HEZ, ICAO: KHEZ, FAA LID: HEZ), also known as Hardy–Anders Field, is a county-owned public-use airport located six nautical miles (11 km) northeast of the central business district of Natchez, a city in Adams County, Mississippi, United States.

== Facilities and aircraft ==
The airport covers an area of 900 acres (360 ha) at an elevation of 272 feet (83 m) above mean sea level. It has two asphalt paved runways: 13/31 is 6,500 by 150 feet (1,981 x 46 m) and 18/36 is 5,000 by 150 feet (1,524 x 46 m).

For the 12-month period ending July 31, 2021, the airport had 15,142 aircraft operations, averaging 41 per day: 94% general aviation, 4% air taxi, and 2% military. At that time, there were 24 aircraft based at this airport: 21 single-engine, 1 multi-engine, 1 jet and 1 helicopter.

== Past airline service ==
Historically, Natchez had scheduled airline service operated by Southern Airways for many years. Southern commenced operations at the airport during the early 1950s with Douglas DC-3 aircraft. The December 1, 1973, Southern Airways system timetable lists several flights a day to Jackson, Memphis, New Orleans, and other destinations operated with 40-passenger Martin 4-0-4 propliners.

Trans-Texas Airways (TTa) also briefly served Natchez from 1959 through 1961 with flights to Jackson, MS; and to Houston, TX, with a stop in Alexandria, LA. TTa operated 21-seat Douglas DC-3s.

After Southern ended all flights to Natchez in 1975, service was replaced by a commuter airline, South Central Air Transport (SCAT) which flew Handley Page Jetstream turboprops to Jackson, New Orleans, and other destinations. SCAT was acquired by Air Illinois in 1977, which then extended their commuter service down south and served Natchez from 1977 through 1980.

From 1980 through 1986, Royale Airlines operated commuter turboprop aircraft to Jackson and New Orleans.

Natchez then went without commercial air service until 1994 when Lone Star Airlines briefly operated Fairchild Swearingen Metroliner commuter propjet flights direct to Dallas/Fort Worth (DFW) via an intermediate stop in Nacogdoches, TX.

United Express began daily service to Houston–Intercontinental on July 1, 2026, ending a more than 30 year drought of commercial air service to the airport.

== Airline and destinations ==
Airlines	Destinations
United Express	Houston–Intercontinental

Destinations map
Destinations from Natchez–Adams County Airport

== See also ==
- List of airports in Mississippi
