= Dunn, Missouri =

Unincorporated community in Texas County, Missouri, United States

Coordinates: 37°08′28″N 92°11′26″W

Dunn is an unincorporated community in southwest Texas County, Missouri, United States. The community is located just south of U.S. Route 60, approximately four miles (6.4 km) west of Cabool.

== History ==
A variant name was Impo. A post office called Impo was established in 1919, and remained in operation until 1955. The present name is after the local Dunn family. The Postal Service rejected the proposed name of Dunn, so the post office became known as Impo (from Important), while the community retained the name Dunn.
