= Clifty Creek (North Fork River tributary) =

Stream in the American state of Missouri

Location
- Country: United States
- State: Missouri
- Region: Wright and Douglas counties

Physical characteristics
- Source
  - coordinates: 37°04′48″N 92°16′26″W
- Mouth
  - coordinates: 36°55′40″N 92°12′35″W
  - elevation: 827 ft (252 m)

Clifty Creek is a stream in eastern Douglas and southeastern Wright counties of Missouri. It is a tributary of the North Fork River.

Clifty Creek source is in a valley in the southeast corner of Wright County just southeast of the intersection of State Route 95 and State Route AD south of Mountain Grove. The stream flows south into Douglas County and passes under Missouri Route 76 northwest of Vanzant then turns southeast and flows through several incised meanders before its confluence with the North Fork a short distance south of Topaz. The elevation of the confluence is 827 ft (252 m).

Clifty Creek was named for the cliffs along its course.

== See also ==
- List of rivers of Missouri
