= Pine Ridge, Mississippi =

- Unincorporated community
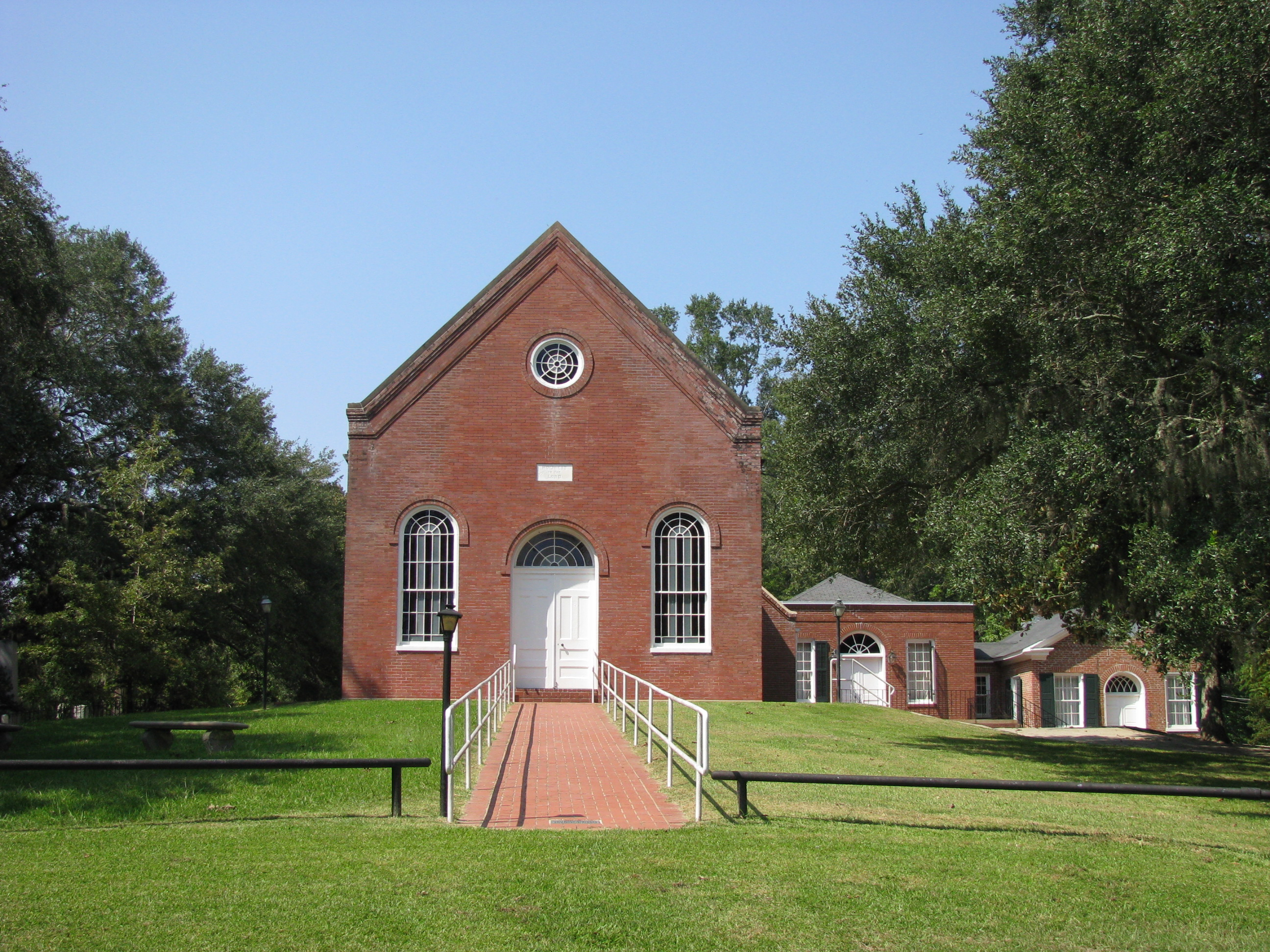
- Pine Ridge Presbyterian Church is listed on the National Register of Historic Places

- Location within Mississippi Location within the United States
- Coordinates: 31°37′44″N 91°20′42″W
- Country: United States
- State: Mississippi
- County: Adams
- Elevation: 279 ft (85 m)
- Time zone: UTC-6 (Central (CST))
  - Summer (DST): UTC-5 (CDT)
- GNIS feature ID: 675866

Pine Ridge is an unincorporated community in Adams County, Mississippi, United States.

Located approximately 7 mi (11 km) northeast of Natchez, the settlement is older than the state of Mississippi.

== History ==
A land grant was issued by the British government for Pine Ridge in 1771, in territory then known as British West Florida. Early settlers were of Scottish heritage.

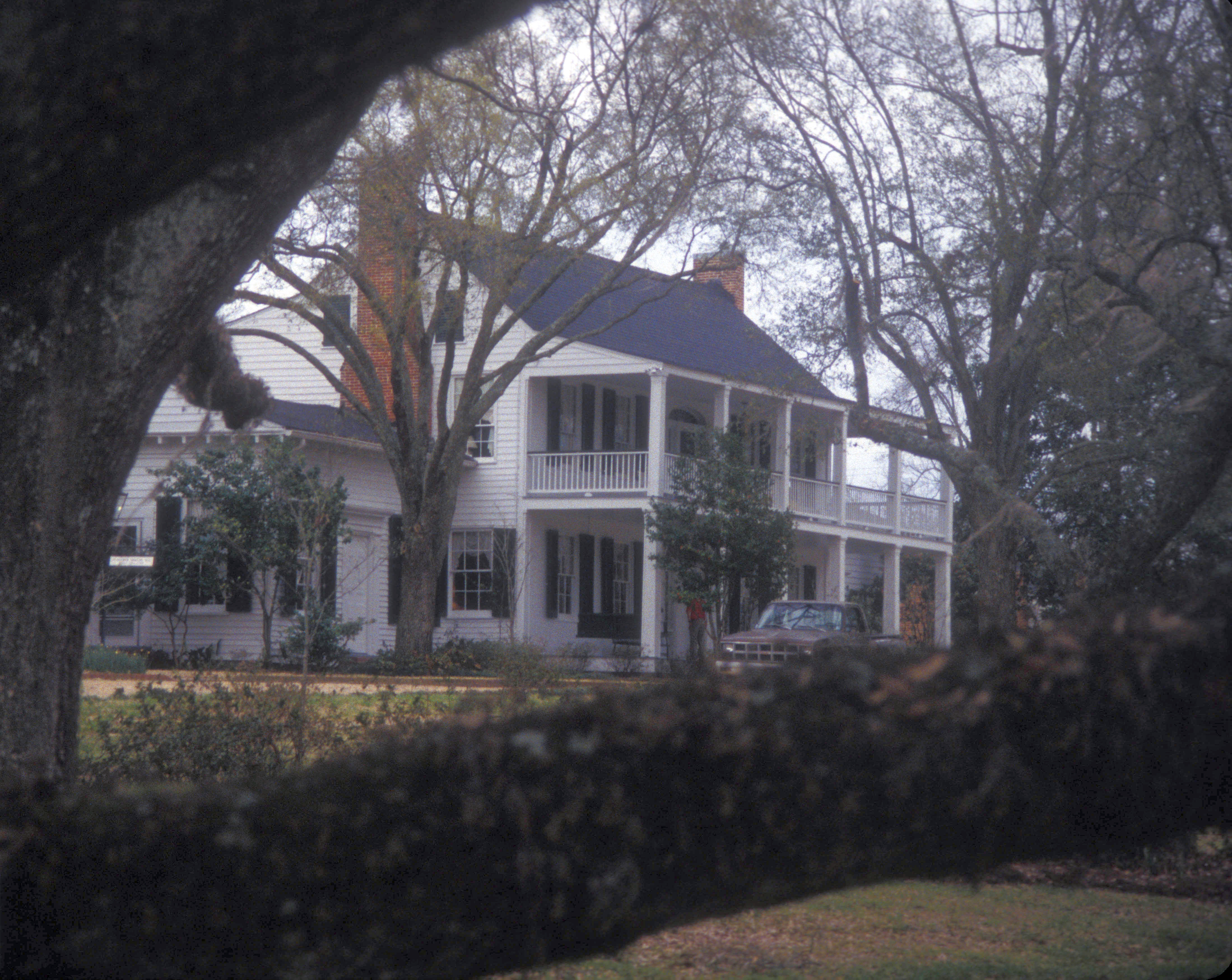
Mount Repose in Pine Ridge was built in 1824 by William Bisland, a plantation owner. It is listed on the National Register of Historic Places.

One of the first cotton gins in Mississippi was erected at Pine Ridge in 1798 by Thomas Wilkins.

The Pine Ridge Presbyterian Church moved to Pine Ridge in 1808, and a session house was built next to the church in 1829. Church elders would conduct business at the session house, and a school was located there until 1904 when a public school was established in the area. The session house is likely the only extant structure of its kind in the state, while the church is the oldest active Presbyterian church in Mississippi. In the early 1830s, a branch of the church was formed to serve the local African-American community. The property was listed on the National Register of Historic Places in 1979, and a Mississippi historic marker is located there.

Pine Ridge Plantation was established at the settlement in the early 1800s by the Pipes family.

The first annual conference of the Methodist Episcopal Church in Mississippi took place at the home of William Foster in Pine Ridge in 1816.

Two military companies from Pine Ridge served in the American Civil War.

A chapter of the National Grange of the Order of Patrons of Husbandry was formed in Pine Ridge in 1873.
