= Missouri Route 114 =

State highway in Missouri, U.S.

Route 114
- MO 114 highlighted in red

Route information
- Maintained by MoDOT
- Length: 22.900 mi (36.854 km)

Major junctions
- West end: Route 25 in Dexter
- Future I-57 / US 60 near Morehouse
- East end: US 61 / US 62 / US 60 Bus. in Sikeston

Location
- Country: United States
- State: Missouri

Highway system
- Missouri State Highway System; Interstate; US; State; Supplemental
← Route 113	→ Route 115

Route 114 is a highway in southeastern Missouri. Its eastern terminus is at Business U.S. Route 60 west of Sikeston; its western terminus is at Route 25 in Dexter.

== Major intersections ==
County	Location	mi	km	Destinations	Notes
Stoddard	Dexter	0.00	0.00	Route 25 – Bloomfield, Bernie	
Stoddard	Richland Township	9.525	15.329	Route 153 – Parma	
Stoddard	Richland Township	14.912	23.999	US 60 (Future I-57) – Sikeston	
New Madrid	No major junctions				
Scott		19.770	31.817	US 60 Bus. west / Route BB	Western end of US 60 Business overlap
Scott	Sikeston	22.900	36.854	US 61 (Main Street) / US 62 / US 60 Bus. east	Eastern end of US 60 Business overlap
1.000 mi = 1.609 km; 1.000 km = 0.621 mi: Concurrency terminus

== See also ==
- List of state highways in Missouri
