= Benton, Missouri =

City in Missouri, U.S.

- City
- Location of Benton, Missouri
- Coordinates: 37°5′56″N 89°33′45″W
- Country: United States
- State: Missouri
- County: Scott

Area
  - Total: 0.64 sq mi (1.65 km^{2})
  - Land: 0.64 sq mi (1.65 km^{2})
  - Water: 0 sq mi (0.00 km^{2})
- Elevation: 436 ft (133 m)

Population (2020)
  - Total: 866
  - Density: 1,362.3/sq mi (525.97/km^{2})
- Time zone: UTC-6 (Central (CST))
  - Summer (DST): UTC-5 (CDT)
- ZIP code: 63736
- Area code: 573
- FIPS code: 29-04798
- GNIS feature ID: 2394142
- Website: www.bentonmissouri.com

Benton is a city in and the county seat of Scott County, Missouri, United States. The population was 866 at the 2020 census.

== History ==
Benton was settled as early as 1796. The town site was platted in 1822. The community was named after Thomas Hart Benton. A post office has been in operation at Benton since 1823.

== Geography ==
According to the United States Census Bureau, the city has a total area of 0.53 square miles (1.37 km^{2}), all land.

== Demographics ==
Historical population
Census	Pop.	Note	%±
1880	109		—
1890	202		85.3%
1900	234		15.8%
1910	320		36.8%
1920	312		−2.5%
1930	345		10.6%
1940	408		18.3%
1950	546		33.8%
1960	554		1.5%
1970	640		15.5%
1980	674		5.3%
1990	575		−14.7%
2000	732		27.3%
2010	863		17.9%
2020	866		0.3%
U.S. Decennial Census

=== 2010 census ===
As of the census of 2010, there were 863 people, 311 households, and 214 families living in the city. The population density was 1,628.3 inhabitants per square mile (628.7/km^{2}). There were 339 housing units at an average density of 639.6 per square mile (247.0/km^{2}). The racial makeup of the city was 94.21% White, 4.87% Black or African American, 0.23% from other races, and 0.70% from two or more races. Hispanic or Latino of any race were 1.51% of the population.

There were 311 households, of which 35.0% had children under the age of 18 living with them, 54.0% were married couples living together, 10.9% had a female householder with no husband present, 3.9% had a male householder with no wife present, and 31.2% were non-families. 27.0% of all households were made up of individuals, and 10.9% had someone living alone who was 65 years of age or older. The average household size was 2.45 and the average family size was 2.97.

The median age in the city was 35.5 years. 24.2% of residents were under the age of 18; 9.5% were between the ages of 18 and 24; 30.5% were from 25 to 44; 24.7% were from 45 to 64; and 11.1% were 65 years of age or older. The gender makeup of the city was 52.8% male and 47.2% female.

=== 2000 census ===
As of the census of 2000, there were 732 people, 287 households, and 191 families living in the city. The population density was 1,770.0 inhabitants per square mile (683.4/km^{2}). There were 301 housing units at an average density of 727.8 per square mile (281.0/km^{2}). The racial makeup of the city was 97.54% White, 2.05% African American and 0.41% Native American. Hispanic or Latino of any race were 1.23% of the population.

There were 287 households, out of which 32.8% had children under the age of 18 living with them, 53.3% were married couples living together, 9.1% had a female householder with no husband present, and 33.4% were non-families. 30.0% of all households were made up of individuals, and 16.7% had someone living alone who was 65 years of age or older. The average household size was 2.40 and the average family size was 3.02.

In the city, the population was spread out, with 23.2% under the age of 18, 10.5% from 18 to 24, 29.8% from 25 to 44, 21.0% from 45 to 64, and 15.4% who were 65 years of age or older. The median age was 36 years. For every 100 females there were 92.6 males. For every 100 females age 18 and over, there were 95.1 males.

The median income for a household in the city was $33,365, and the median income for a family was $45,179. Males had a median income of $27,014 versus $20,662 for females. The per capita income for the city was $16,161. About 4.2% of families and 7.5% of the population were below the poverty line, including 8.9% of those under age 18 and 7.2% of those age 65 or over.

== Education ==
It is in the Scott County R-IV School District, which operates one elementary school, one middle school, and Thomas W. Kelly High School.

Prior to 1954, the community had its own school district. That year, it consolidated into Scott County R-IV. Kelly High was scheduled to open on August 29, 1957. It was named after a man from Benton who died as a soldier in World War II.

Benton has a public library, a branch of the Riverside Regional Library.

Three Rivers College's service area includes Scott County.

== See also ==
- List of cities in Missouri
