= Browns, Boone County, Missouri =

Unincorporated community in Boone County, Missouri, United States

Coordinates: 39°03′00″N 92°15′41″W

Browns is an unincorporated community in Boone County, Missouri, United States. It is located northeast of Columbia on Paris Road (Missouri Route 8). Browns was once a stop on the Columbia Terminal Railroad.

== History ==
A variant name was "Brown's Station". The community was named after Leonidas B. Brown, a local medical doctor. A post office called Browns Station was established in 1875, and remained in operation until 1957.
