= Morehouse, Missouri =

- City
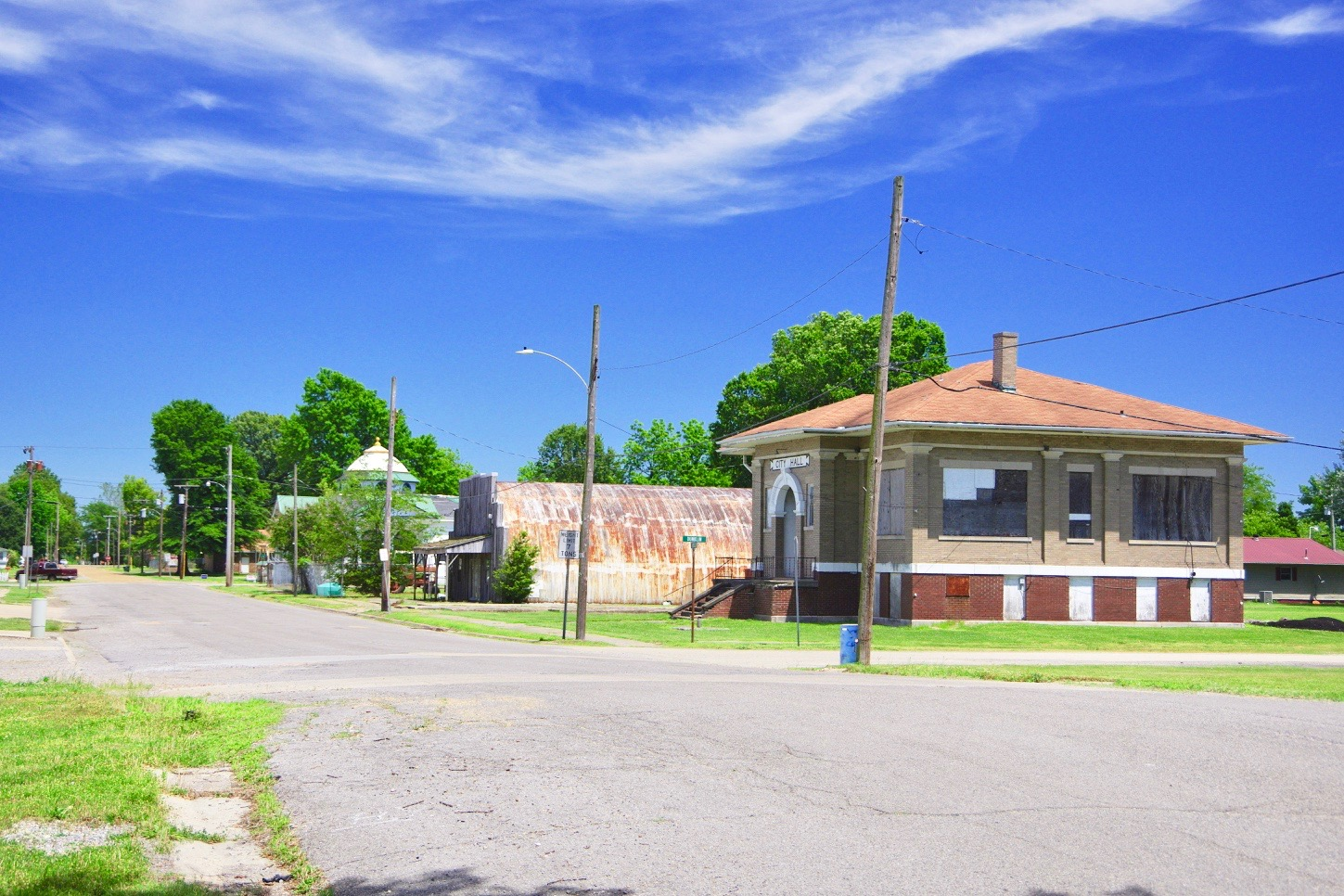
- Beech Street

- Location of Morehouse, Missouri
- Coordinates: 36°50′47″N 89°41′27″W
- Country: United States
- State: Missouri
- County: New Madrid

Area
  - Total: 0.80 sq mi (2.08 km^{2})
  - Land: 0.80 sq mi (2.08 km^{2})
  - Water: 0 sq mi (0.00 km^{2})
- Elevation: 299 ft (91 m)

Population (2020)
  - Total: 741
  - Density: 922.1/sq mi (356.04/km^{2})
- Time zone: UTC-6 (Central (CST))
  - Summer (DST): UTC-5 (CDT)
- ZIP code: 63868
- Area code: 573
- FIPS code: 29-49898
- GNIS feature ID: 2395399

Morehouse is a city in New Madrid County, Missouri, United States. The population was 741 at the 2020 census.

== History ==
Morehouse was established as a lumber camp in the 19th century. It was known as "Little River" from 1877 to 1887. When a post office was established in 1893, it was named "Morehouse" after Albert P. Morehouse, who served as the 26th Governor of Missouri from 1887 to 1889.

== Geography ==
Morehouse lies along Missouri Route 114 west of Sikeston. U.S. Route 60 passes along the city's southern boundary.

According to the United States Census Bureau, the city has a total area of 0.79 square miles (2.05 km^{2}), all land.

== Demographics ==
Historical population
Census	Pop.	Note	%±
1900	900		—
1910	1,636		81.8%
1920	1,913		16.9%
1930	1,165		−39.1%
1940	1,598		37.2%
1950	1,635		2.3%
1960	1,417		−13.3%
1970	1,332		−6.0%
1980	1,220		−8.4%
1990	1,068		−12.5%
2000	1,015		−5.0%
2010	973		−4.1%
2020	741		−23.8%
U.S. Decennial Census

=== 2010 census ===
As of the census of 2010, there were 973 people, 426 households, and 268 families living in the city. The population density was 1,231.6 inhabitants per square mile (475.5/km^{2}). There were 499 housing units at an average density of 631.6 per square mile (243.9/km^{2}). The racial makeup of the city was 95.89% White, 0.82% Black or African American, 0.31% Native American, 0.10% Asian, 1.03% from other races, and 1.85% from two or more races. Hispanic or Latino of any race were 1.95% of the population.

There were 426 households, of which 27.2% had children under the age of 18 living with them, 41.5% were married couples living together, 13.1% had a female householder with no husband present, 8.2% had a male householder with no wife present, and 37.1% were non-families. 31.5% of all households were made up of individuals, and 14.6% had someone living alone who was 65 years of age or older. The average household size was 2.28 and the average family size was 2.82.

The median age in the city was 42.9 years. 21.5% of residents were under the age of 18; 6.6% were between the ages of 18 and 24; 24.9% were from 25 to 44; 30.1% were from 45 to 64; and 16.8% were 65 years of age or older. The gender makeup of the city was 48.6% male and 51.4% female.

=== 2000 census ===
As of the census of 2000, there were 1,015 people, 428 households, and 294 families living in the city. The population density was 1,240.9 inhabitants per square mile (479.1/km^{2}). There were 492 housing units at an average density of 601.5 per square mile (232.2/km^{2}). The racial makeup of the city was 97.04% White, 0.49% African American, 0.30% Native American, 0.10% Asian, 0.69% from other races, and 1.38% from two or more races. Hispanic or Latino of any race were 2.56% of the population.

There were 428 households, out of which 26.9% had children under the age of 18 living with them, 53.3% were married couples living together, 9.8% had a female householder with no husband present, and 31.1% were non-families. 25.9% of all households were made up of individuals, and 15.0% had someone living alone who was 65 years of age or older. The average household size was 2.37 and the average family size was 2.80.

In the city the population was spread out, with 22.9% under the age of 18, 8.6% from 18 to 24, 27.4% from 25 to 44, 24.1% from 45 to 64, and 17.0% who were 65 years of age or older. The median age was 38 years. For every 100 females there were 88.0 males. For every 100 females age 18 and over, there were 86.9 males.

The median income for a household in the city was $24,931, and the median income for a family was $30,144. Males had a median income of $26,389 versus $17,941 for females. The per capita income for the city was $12,691. About 10.5% of families and 13.2% of the population were below the poverty line, including 9.0% of those under age 18 and 24.1% of those age 65 or over.

== Education ==
It is in the Sikeston R-VI School District. Sikeston High School is the comprehensive high school of the Sikeston school district.

The Morehouse Elementary School used to be operated by the district. The district began considering closing the school in April 2011. The decision to close the school was finalized in June 2011. The building now stands empty.

Morehouse has a lending library, a branch of the New Madrid County Library.

Three Rivers College's service area includes New Madrid County.

== Notable people ==
- Kasey Rogers (1925-2006), actress
