= Big Piney River =

River in Pulaski and Texas counties in Missouri, United States

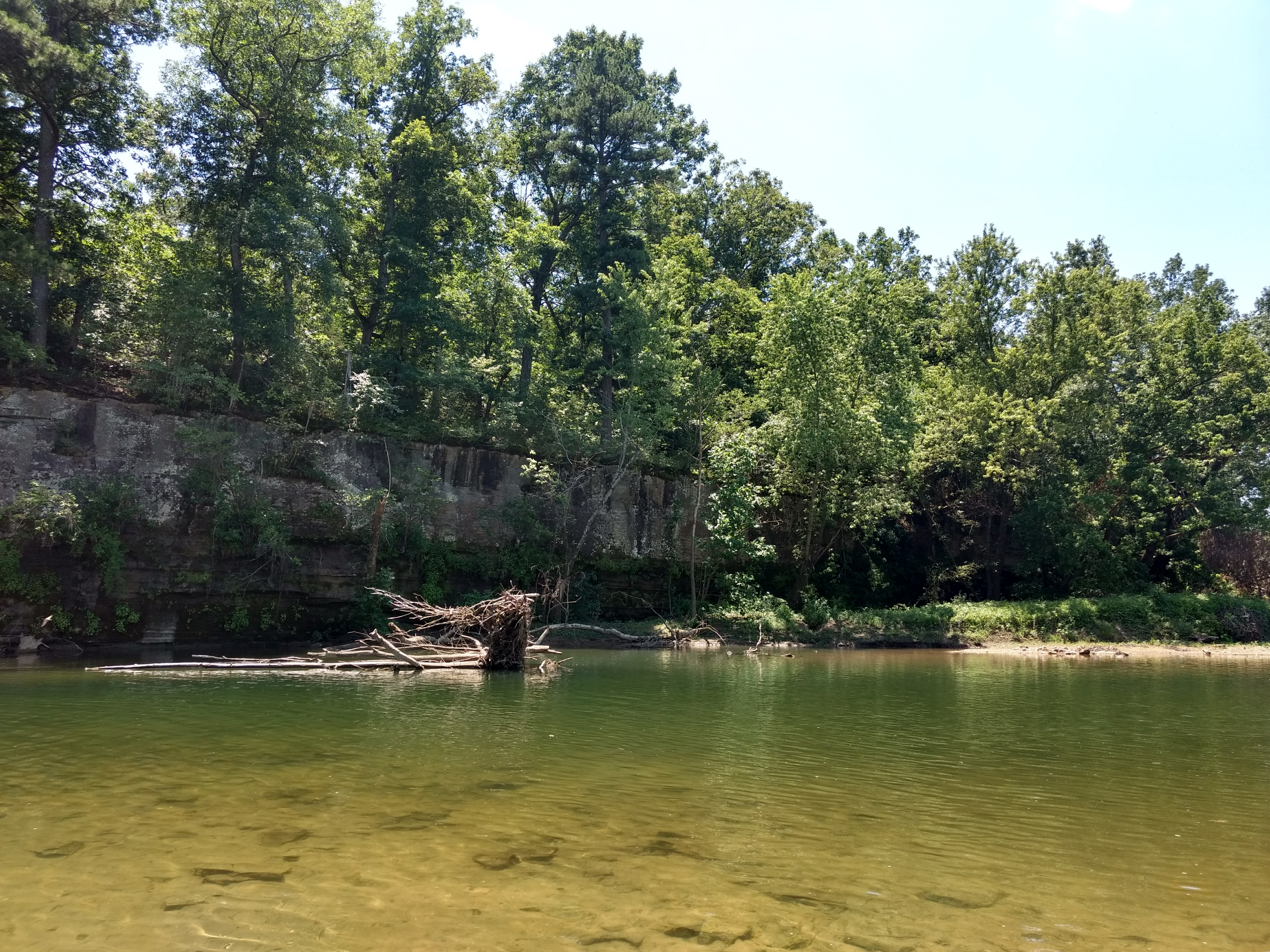
- The Big Piney River near Houston, Missouri.

Location
- Country: United States
- State: Missouri
- Region: Ozark Plateau
- Cities: Cabool, Houston, Fort Leonard Wood

Physical characteristics
- Source
  - location: Dunn, Missouri
  - coordinates: 37°08′47″N 92°11′18″W
  - elevation: 1,500 ft (460 m)
- Mouth: Gasconade River
  - location: North of Devils Elbow, Missouri, Pulaski County, North-Central Ozark Plateau, Missouri
  - coordinates: 37°53′01″N 92°03′51″W
  - elevation: 689 ft (210 m)
- Discharge
  - location: Fort Leonard Wood, Missouri
  - average: 685 cu/ft. per sec.

Basin features
- Tributaries
  - left: West Piney Creek, Paddy Creek
  - right: Arthur Creek, Indian Creek

The Big Piney River is a 110-mile-long (180 km) tributary of the Gasconade River in Pulaski and Texas counties in Missouri, United States. Via the Gasconade and Missouri rivers, it is part of the Mississippi River basin.

== Description ==
The stream headwaters are located in southwest Texas County just north of the community of Dunn and U. S. Route 60. The stream flows east and southeast passing just south of Cabool passing under Route 60 Business, Missouri Route 181 and U. S. Route 63. The stream course turns northeast and runs parallel to Route 63 passing under it three times before turning northwest to the north of Simmons. The stream meanders north passing under Missouri Route 17 to the west of Houston and east of Bucyrus. The stream continues north passing under Missouri Route 32 and on past Hazleton passing the Paddy Creek Recreation Area and the Slabtown Spring area. The stream enters southeastern Pulaski County. It continues north past Ross Bridge and through an eastern section of the Fort Leonard Wood reservation. North of Fort Leonard Wood the stream veers sharply east, briefly passing through a section of Phelps County north of Spring Creek. It meanders back west and flows past Moab and Devils Elbow before passing under Interstate 44 and past Hooker before reaching its confluence with the Gasconade.

Big Piney River was so named on account of thick pine timber near its banks.

== See also ==
- List of rivers of Missouri
