= Bertrand, Missouri =

- City
- Location in Mississippi County and the state of Missouri

- Location of Missouri in the United States
- Coordinates: 36°54′30″N 89°27′00″W
- Country: United States
- State: Missouri
- County: Mississippi
- Established: October 1859

Area
  - Total: 0.83 sq mi (2.14 km^{2})
  - Land: 0.82 sq mi (2.13 km^{2})
  - Water: 0 sq mi (0.00 km^{2})
- Elevation: 318 ft (97 m)

Population (2020)
  - Total: 718
  - Density: 871.6/sq mi (336.52/km^{2})
- Time zone: UTC-6 (Central (CST))
  - Summer (DST): UTC-5 (CDT)
- ZIP code: 63823
- Area code: 573
- FIPS code: 29-04996
- GNIS feature ID: 2394153

Bertrand is a city in Mississippi County, Missouri, United States. The population was 718 at the 2020 census, down from 821 in 2010.

== History ==
Bertrand was platted in 1859. The community bears the name of one Mr. Bertrand, a railroad promoter. A post office called Bertrand has been in operation since 1874.

== Geography ==
Bertrand is in northwestern Mississippi County, 6 miles (10 km) west of Charleston, the county seat, and 8 miles (13 km) east-northeast of Sikeston. U.S. Route 62 passes through the center of Bertrand as Cedar Street. Interstate 57 passes just south of the city limits, with access from Exit 4 (State Highway B). I-57 leads southwest 4 miles (6 km) to its southern terminus at Interstate 55 near Sikeston and northeast 17 miles (27 km) to its crossing of the Mississippi River near Cairo, Illinois.

According to the U.S. Census Bureau, Bertrand has a total area of 0.82 square miles (2.12 km^{2}), of which 0.001 square miles (0.003 km^{2}), or 0.12%, are water.

== Demographics ==
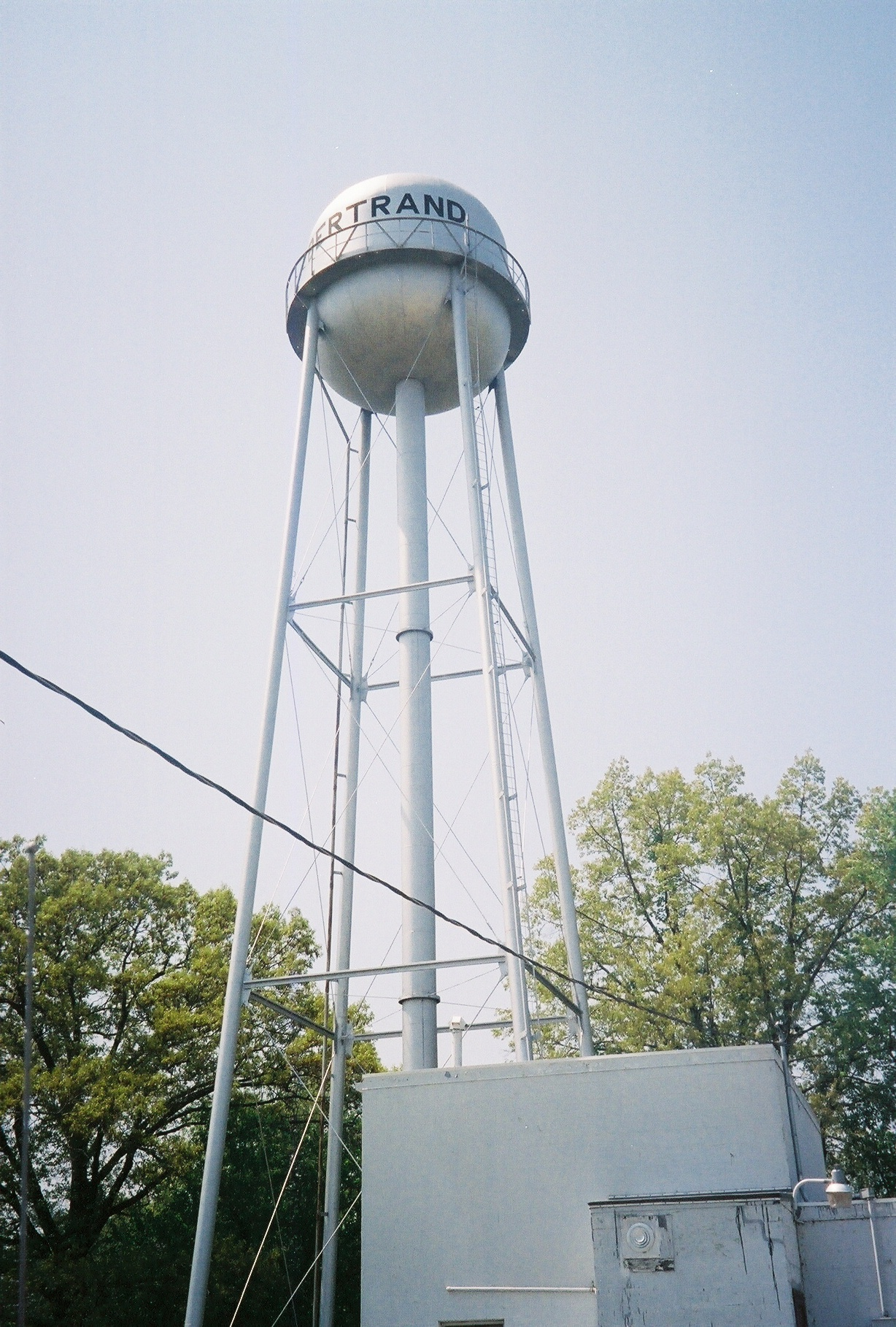
Bertrand watertower

Historical population
Census	Pop.	Note	%±
1880	126		—
1890	221		75.4%
1900	266		20.4%
1910	346		30.1%
1920	355		2.6%
1930	322		−9.3%
1940	377		17.1%
1950	390		3.4%
1960	465		19.2%
1970	604		29.9%
1980	688		13.9%
1990	692		0.6%
2000	740		6.9%
2010	821		10.9%
2020	718		−12.5%

=== 2010 census ===
As of the census of 2010, there were 821 people, 341 households, and 232 families living in the city. The population density was 1,052.6 inhabitants per square mile (406.4/km^{2}). There were 355 housing units at an average density of 455.1 per square mile (175.7/km^{2}). The racial makeup of the city was 97.32% White, 1.83% Black or African American, 0.12% Native American, 0.12% Asian, 0.12% from other races, and 0.49% from two or more races. Hispanic or Latino of any race were 1.95% of the population.

There were 341 households, of which 33.4% had children under the age of 18 living with them, 45.2% were married couples living together, 18.8% had a female householder with no husband present, 4.1% had a male householder with no wife present, and 32.0% were non-families. 27.3% of all households were made up of individuals, and 12.6% had someone living alone who was 65 years of age or older. The average household size was 2.30 and the average family size was 2.74.

The median age in the city was 46.1 years. 23% of residents were under the age of 18; 5.9% were between the ages of 18 and 24; 19.8% were from 25 to 44; 28.4% were from 45 to 64; and 22.9% were 65 years of age or older. The gender makeup of the city was 45.2% male and 54.8% female.

=== 2000 census ===
As of the census of 2000, there were 740 people, 316 households, and 207 families living in the city. The population density was 1,115.2 inhabitants per square mile (430.6/km^{2}). There were 351 housing units at an average density of 528.9 per square mile (204.2/km^{2}). The racial makeup of the city was 95.81% White, 2.84% African American, 0.41% Native American, and 0.95% from two or more races. Hispanic or Latino of any race were 0.41% of the population.

There were 316 households, out of which 21.5% had children under the age of 18 residing with them, 52.2% were married couples living together, 13.0% had a female householder with no husband present, and 34.2% were non-families. 29.7% of all households were made up of individuals, and 13.0% had someone living alone who was 65 years of age or older. The average household size was 2.17 and the average family size was 2.66.

In the city the population was spread out, with 17.0% under the age of 18, 7.6% from 18 to 24, 24.6% from 25 to 44, 27.6% from 45 to 64, and 23.2% who were 65 years of age or older. The median age was 46 years. For every 100 females there were 84.5 males. For every 100 females age 18 and over, there were 80.6 males.

The median income for a household in the city was $26,023, and the median income for a family was $32,833. Males had a median income of $24,643 versus $21,042 for females. The per capita income for the city was $15,346. About 14.6% of families and 15.4% of the population were below the poverty line, including 17.4% of those under age 18 and 11.7% of those age 65 or over.

== Education ==
It is in the Charleston R-I School District.
