= Transportation in St. Louis =

Transportation in American city

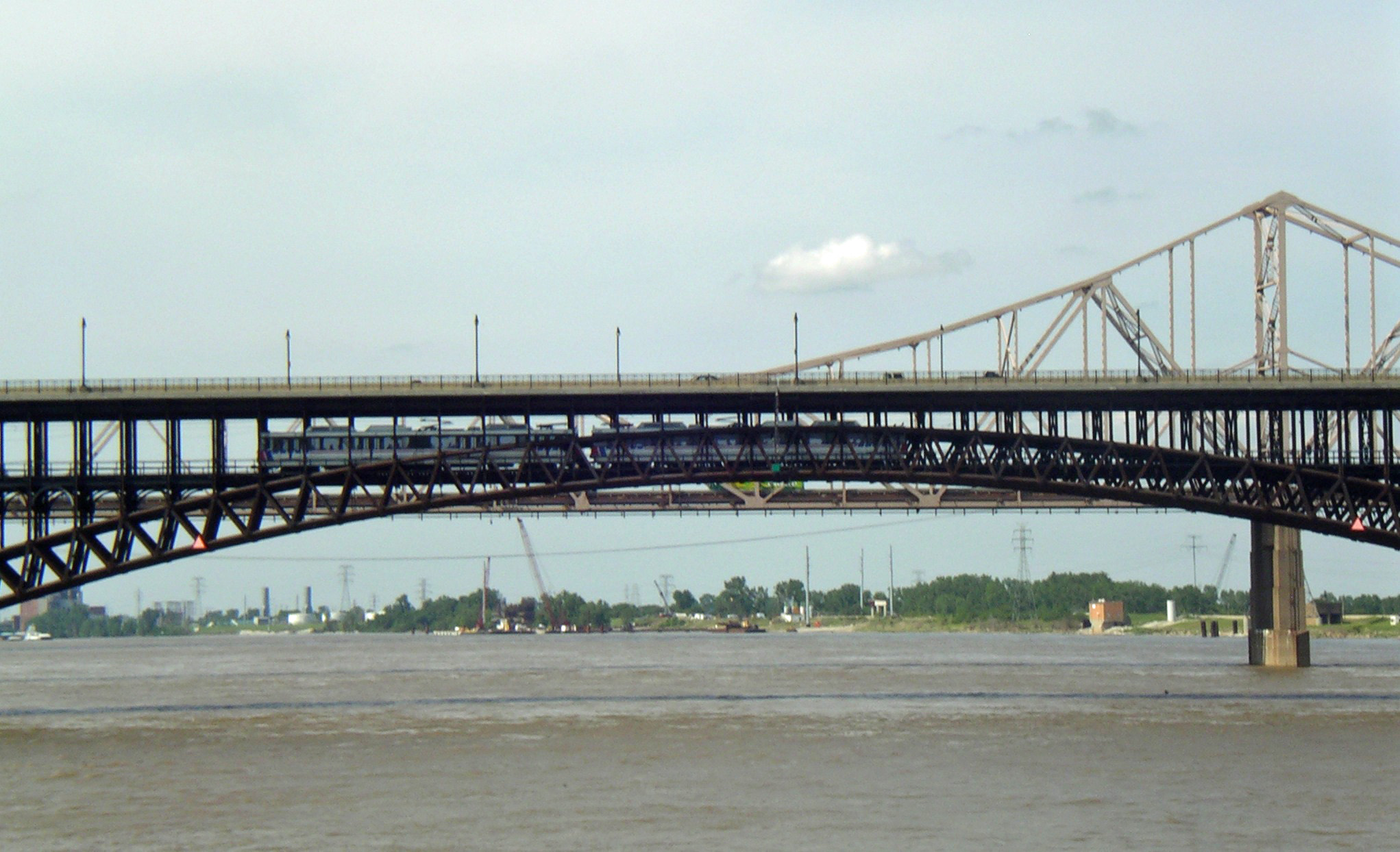
- MetroLink crossing the Eads Bridge

Overview
- Locale: St. Louis and surrounding area
- Transit type: Airports, bus, paratransit, light rail, streetcar, taxicabs, rideshare, highways, bike lanes, greenways, shared-use paths, ferries, inland ports

Operation
- Operators: Madison County Transit; Metro Transit; St. Clair County Transit District; Great Rivers Greenway; Private operators
- Infrastructure managers: Bi-State Development Agency; Terminal Railroad Association of St. Louis; St. Louis Port Authority; Illinois Department of Transportation; Missouri Department of Transportation

Transportation in Greater St. Louis, Missouri includes road, rail, ship, and air transportation modes connecting the bi-state St. Louis metropolitan area with surrounding communities throughout the metropolitan area, national transportation networks, and international locations. The Greater St. Louis region also supports a multi-modal transportation network that includes bus, light rail, and paratransit service in addition to shared-use paths, bike lanes and greenways.

== Roads, highways, and bridges ==
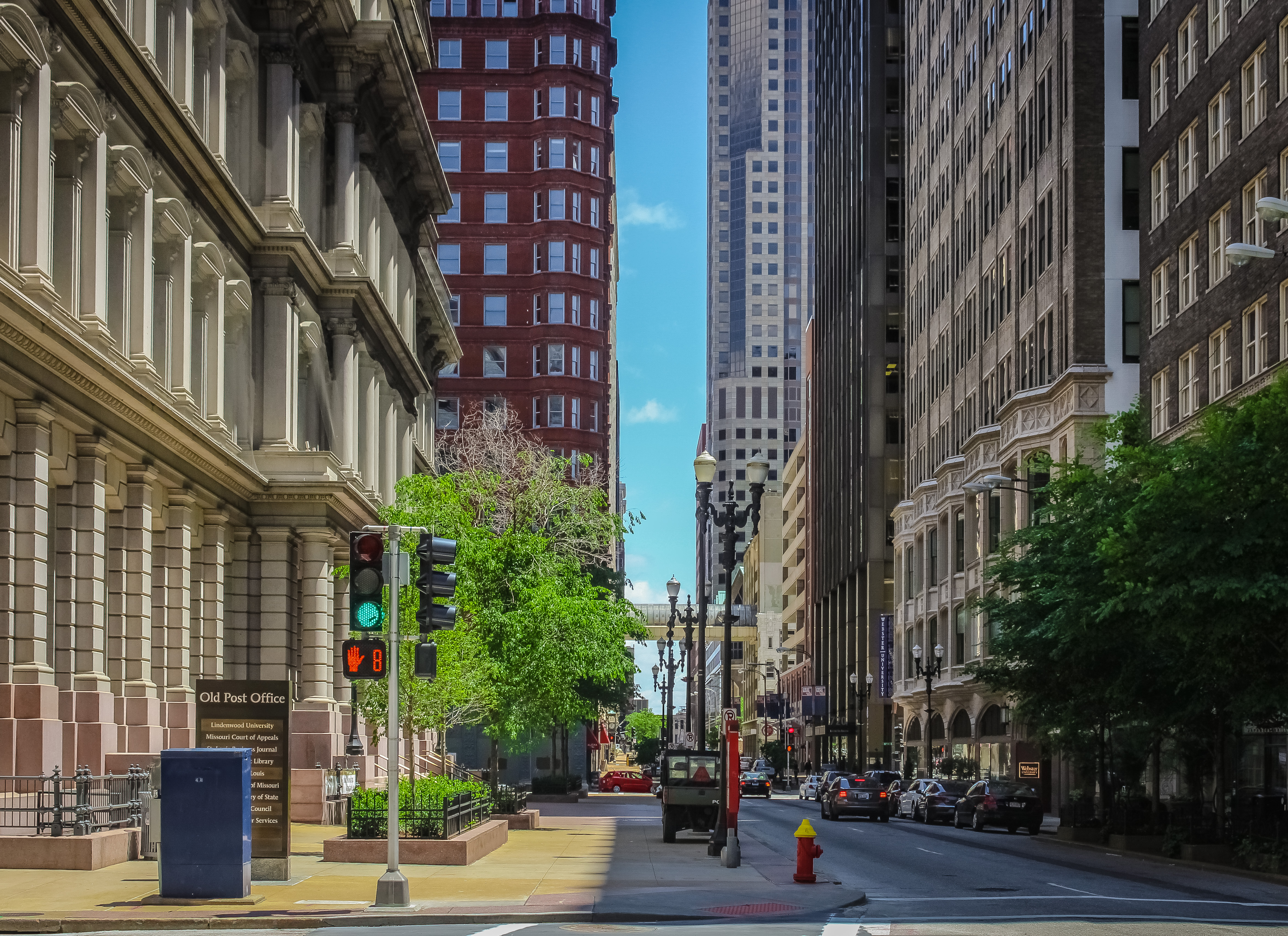
Olive Street in downtown St. Louis

The city of St. Louis has several major arterial roadways and boulevards. Important north-south routes include Broadway, Tucker Boulevard (which turns into Gravois Avenue and runs southwest to the city limits), Jefferson Avenue, Grand Boulevard, Vandeventer Avenue, Kingshighway Boulevard, and finally Skinker Boulevard. The latter two run on the east and west edges of Forest Park, respectively. Several of the city's primary arterials also continue into the St. Louis County suburbs. Some of those routes include West Florissant Avenue, Natural Bridge Avenue, and Dr. Martin Luther King Drive (which turns into St. Charles Rock Road), all of which carry traffic from downtown to the North County suburbs. Others are Clayton Road, Manchester Avenue, Chippewa Street (which turns into Watson Road), and South Broadway (eventually turning into Telegraph Road), all of which carry traffic from the city to the West and South County suburbs.

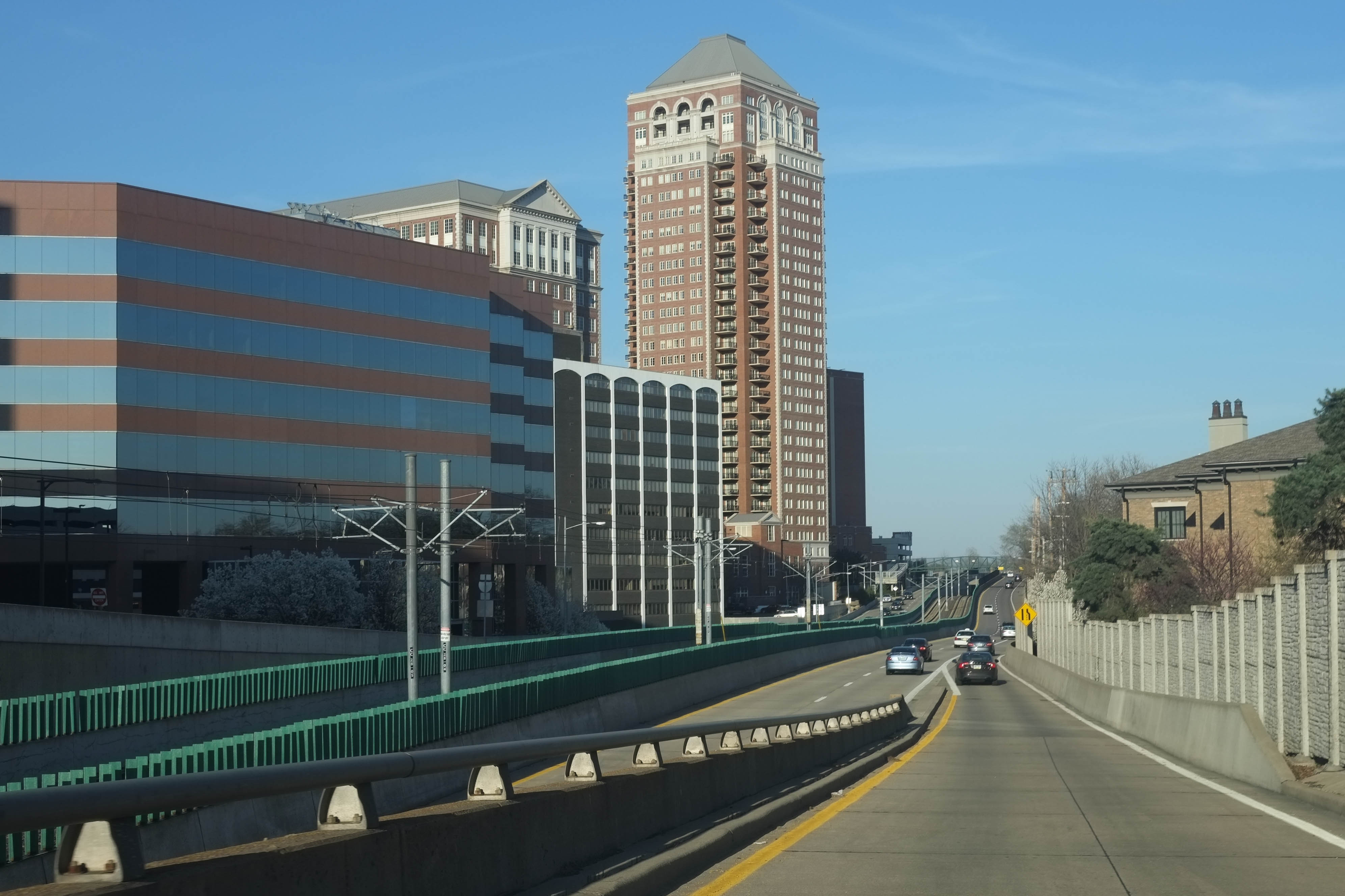
Forest Park Parkway in downtown Clayton

Other major corridors between the city and county include Market Street-Forest Park and Olive Boulevard. Market Street begins at the Arch Grounds and continues west, eventually turning into Forest Park Avenue in Midtown. After crossing Kingshighway in the Central West End, the name changes to Forest Park Parkway and the road takes on characteristics more similar to a divided highway until it reaches its terminus at Interstate 170 near downtown Clayton. Olive Boulevard, which is unrelated to downtown's Olive Street, begins at Skinker Boulevard on the city-county line and runs due west through the suburbs of University City, Olivette, Creve Coeur, and Chesterfield where it turns south and changes to Clarkson Road at Interstate 64. From here it continues through Clarkson Valley before ending at Manchester Road in Ellisville, Missouri.

Other county arterials include major north-south routes like Big Bend Boulevard, Hanley Road, Laclede Station Road, Lindbergh Boulevard, and Ballas Road.

Page Boulevard begins as a city street near midtown St. Louis continuing west and changing to Page Avenue at the city-county line. From here it travels through the suburbs of Wellston, Pagedale, Hanley Hills, Vinita Park, Overland, and Maryland Heights, Missouri. After its intersection with Lindbergh Boulevard, Page takes on the characteristics of a wide highway with stoplights at Westport Center Drive and Schuetz Road. West of Schuetz near Interstate 270 Page Avenue becomes Highway 364 and runs as a controlled-access highway through the communities of St. Charles, St. Peters, Cottleville, O'Fallon, and Lake St. Louis, Missouri, where it ends at Interstate 64.

Other major routes in St. Charles County include 1st Capitol Drive, 5th Street, Muegge Road, Mid Rivers Mall Drive, Mexico Road, and routes K and N.

Primary routes in the Metro East (Illinois) suburbs include Missouri Avenue, Kingshighway, St. Clair Avenue, Mississippi Avenue, Illinois Street, and Green Mount Road in St. Clair County. Major routes in Madison County include Edwardsville Road, Nameoki Road, Troy Road, University Drive, and Lewis and Clark Boulevard.

The Great River Road enters the region on Illinois Route 3 in the south and generally travels through the American Bottom. Eventually it joins Lewis and Clark Boulevard and then Berm Highway towards Alton, Illinois. North of Alton the Great River Road aligns with Illinois Route 100 and runs alongside the Mississippi River to Grafton before exiting the region.

=== Interstates and highways ===
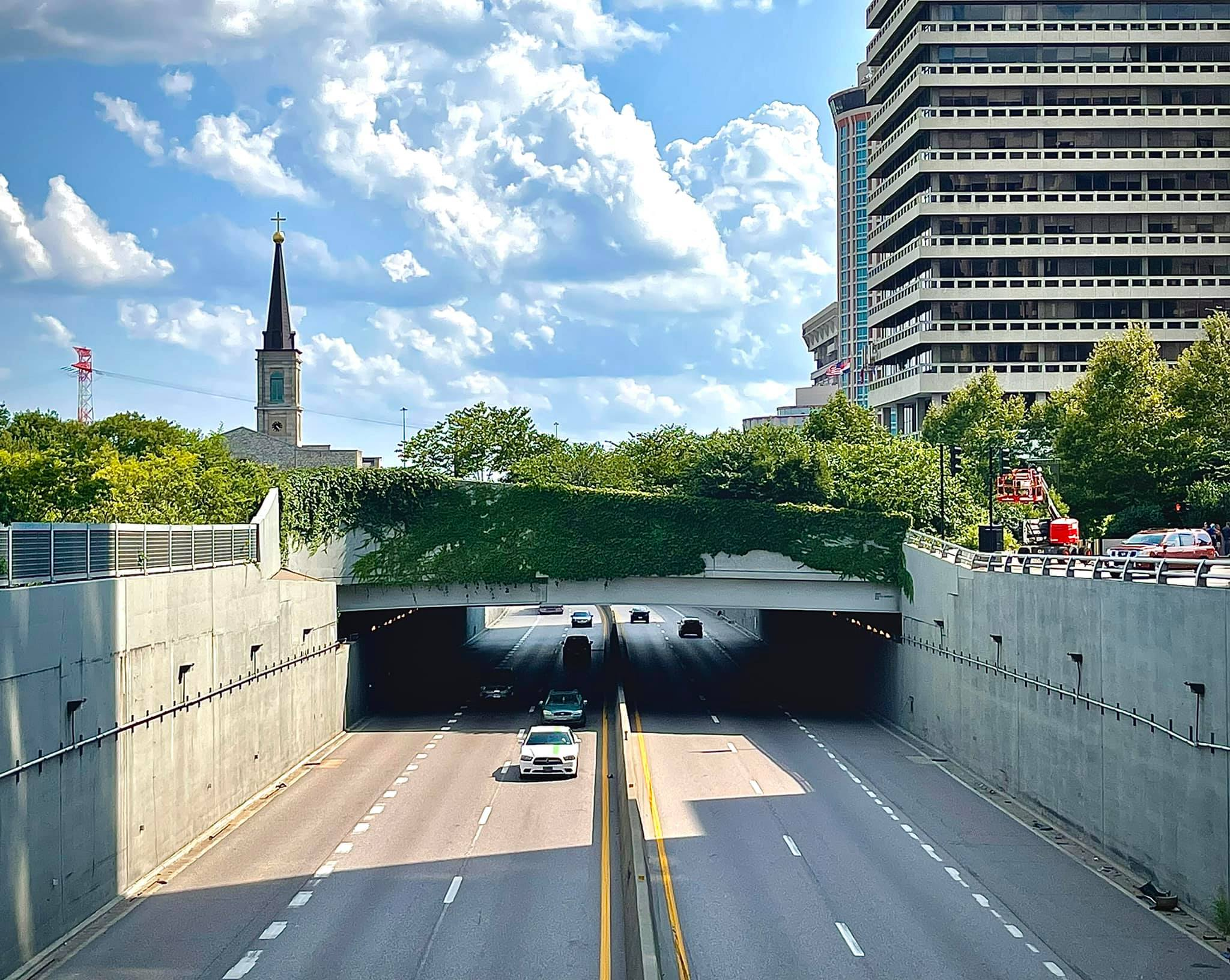
Interstate 44 passing beneath the Park Over the Highway in downtown St. Louis

Among the primary Interstates, Interstate 70 travels west to east through Warren, St. Charles, and St. Louis counties and the city of St. Louis, leaving Missouri over the Stan Musial Veterans Memorial Bridge into St. Clair County, Illinois. Interstate 55 travels south to north through Jefferson and St. Louis counties and the city of St. Louis, briefly merging with Interstate 44, then crossing the Poplar Street Bridge. Interstate 64's western terminus is in Wentzville, Missouri, at its interchange with I-70 and U.S. Route 61. From here it shares an alignment with U.S. Route 40 as it crosses into St. Louis County on the Daniel Boone Bridge and then continues through the city and crosses the Poplar Street Bridge with I-55. After entering East St. Louis, Illinois, I-64 splits off towards eastern St. Clair County and I-70 and I-55 share an alignment until they reach Troy, Illinois. From here I-55 continues north toward Chicago while I-70 continues east toward Indianapolis. I-44 enters the St. Louis region in Sullivan, Missouri, and runs eastward through Franklin and St. Louis counties, briefly merging with I-55 in the city of St. Louis, and terminating at I-70.

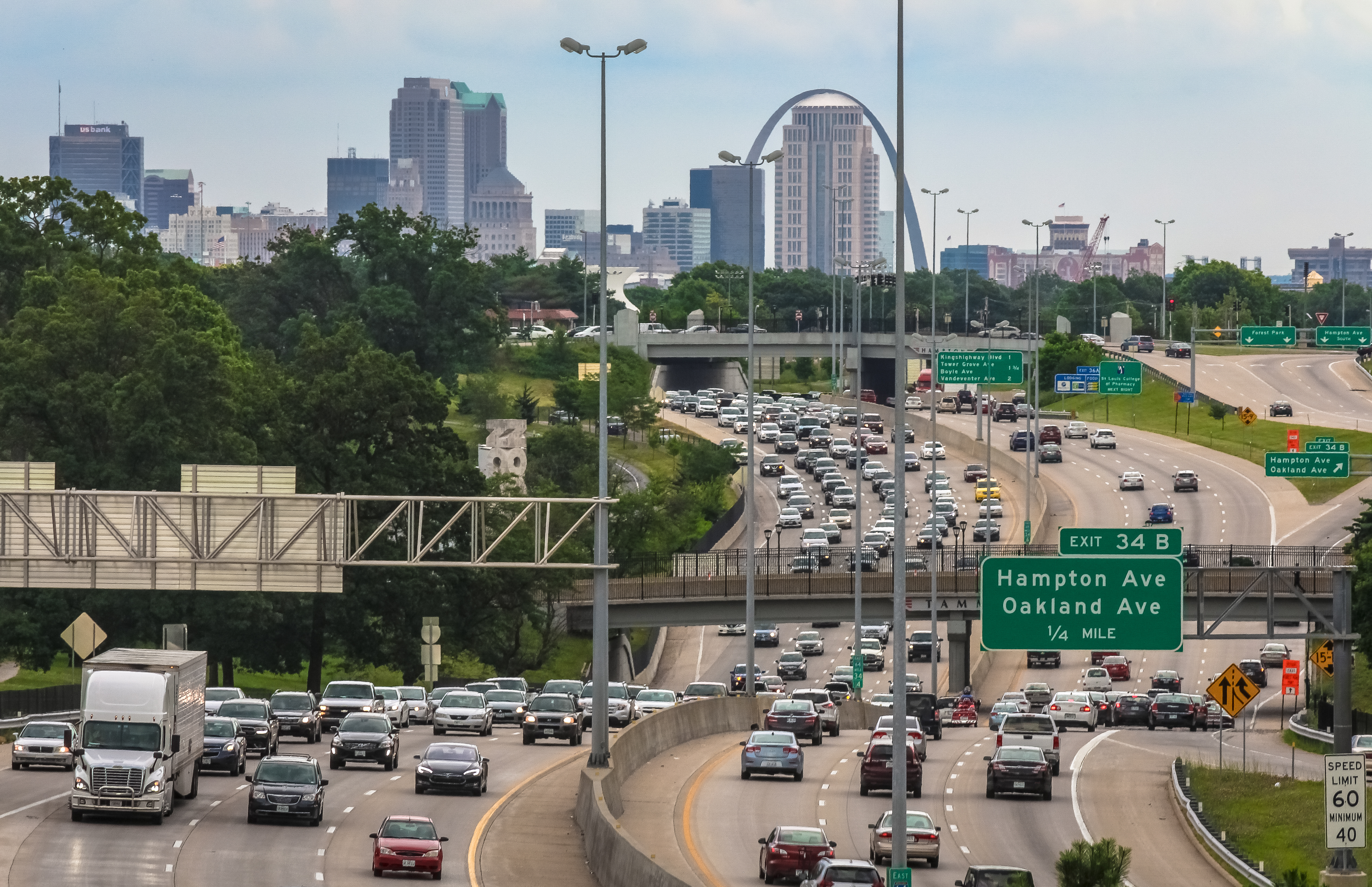
Afternoon traffic on 64/40 in Forest Park

The "beltway" serving Greater St. Louis is the combination of Interstate 270 and Interstate 255, the former a mostly western bypass of St. Louis City. I-270 crosses into Illinois at the northern edge of the city on the New Chain of Rocks Bridge and continues through Madison County, Illinois, until ending at the I-55 and I-70 interchange near Troy. In southern St. Louis County, I-270 ends at the I-55 interchange near Mehlville, Missouri, where the roadway becomes I-255 and continues east across the Mississippi River on the Jefferson Barracks Bridge into Monroe County, Illinois. Here it turns north, traveling through St. Clair County until ending at I-270 in Madison County. Known locally as the "Inner Belt Expressway," Interstate 170 runs entirely within St. Louis County, traveling southerly from I-270 in Hazelwood to I-64 in Richmond Heights.

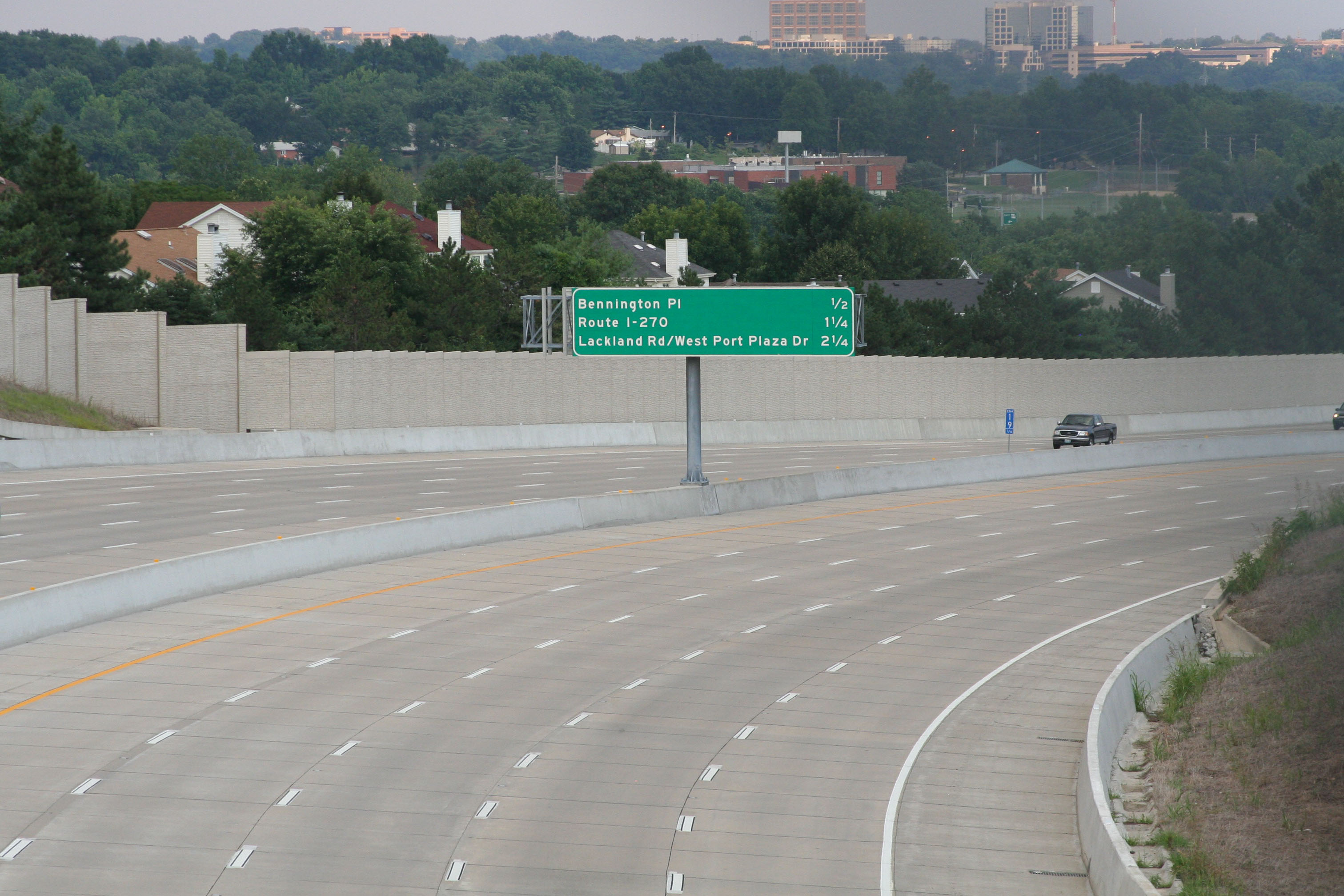
Route 364 at Amiot Drive

Other secondary highways in the area include Highway 141 (originally designed as a western "outer belt" to I-270) and highways 364 and 370 which serve suburban St. Charles County.

U.S. Route 50 enters Greater St. Louis near Gerald, eastward through Franklin County; at Union, it meets I-44, both continuing to Sunset Hills in St. Louis County. US 50, eastward, merges with US 61 and U.S. Route 67 (Lindbergh Boulevard). The US 50/US 61/US 67 concurrency continues to the I-55/I-255/I-270 interchange, where they follow I-255 across the Mississippi River. US 50 continues east through Monroe County into St. Clair County, traveling concurrently with I-64 into O'Fallon, where US 50 splits, continuing through Clinton County.

US 61 enters the region from the south, paralleling I-55 in Jefferson County, continuing to Festus where it travels concurrently with US 67. US 61/US 67 continues into St. Louis County until reaching the I-55/I-255/I-270 interchange, where US 61/US 67 follows Lindbergh Boulevard. US 61 continues north into Frontenac, where it joins westbound I-64. US 61 continues west through St. Louis County and into St. Charles County, then leaves I-64 in Wentzville and continues north into Lincoln County and beyond.

US 67 enters the region northbound in Farmington, Missouri, where it continues into Festus, traveling concurrently with US 61 and paralleling I-55. US 67 splits from US 61 in Frontenac with US 67 continuing north on Lindbergh Boulevard. At Missouri Route 367, US 67 turns north, crosses the Missouri River on the Lewis Bridge, before briefly entering St. Charles County and then crosses the Mississippi River on the Clark Bridge near Alton, Illinois and passes through Madison and Jersey counties before leaving the region.

The Greater St. Louis region is also served by several state highways that are listed in the table below.

Interstates and State Highways serving Greater St. Louis
**Interstates**	**U.S. Highways**	**Missouri State Routes**		**Illinois State Routes**	
I-44; I-55; I-64; I-70; I-170; I-255; I-270	US 40; US 50; US 61; US 67	Route 8; Route 19; Route 21; Route 30; Route 47; Route 49; Route 79; Route 94; Route 100; Route 109; Route 110	Route 115; Route 141; Route 147; Route 180; Route 185; Route 231; Route 340; Route 267; Route 364; Route 366; Route 367; Route 370	IL 3; IL 4; IL 13; IL 15; IL 16; IL 96; IL 100; IL 108; IL 109; IL 111; IL 127; IL 138; IL 140	IL 143; IL 156; IL 157; IL 158; IL 159; IL 160; IL 161; IL 162; IL 163; IL 177; IL 203; IL 255; IL 267

=== Bridges, viaducts, and tunnels ===
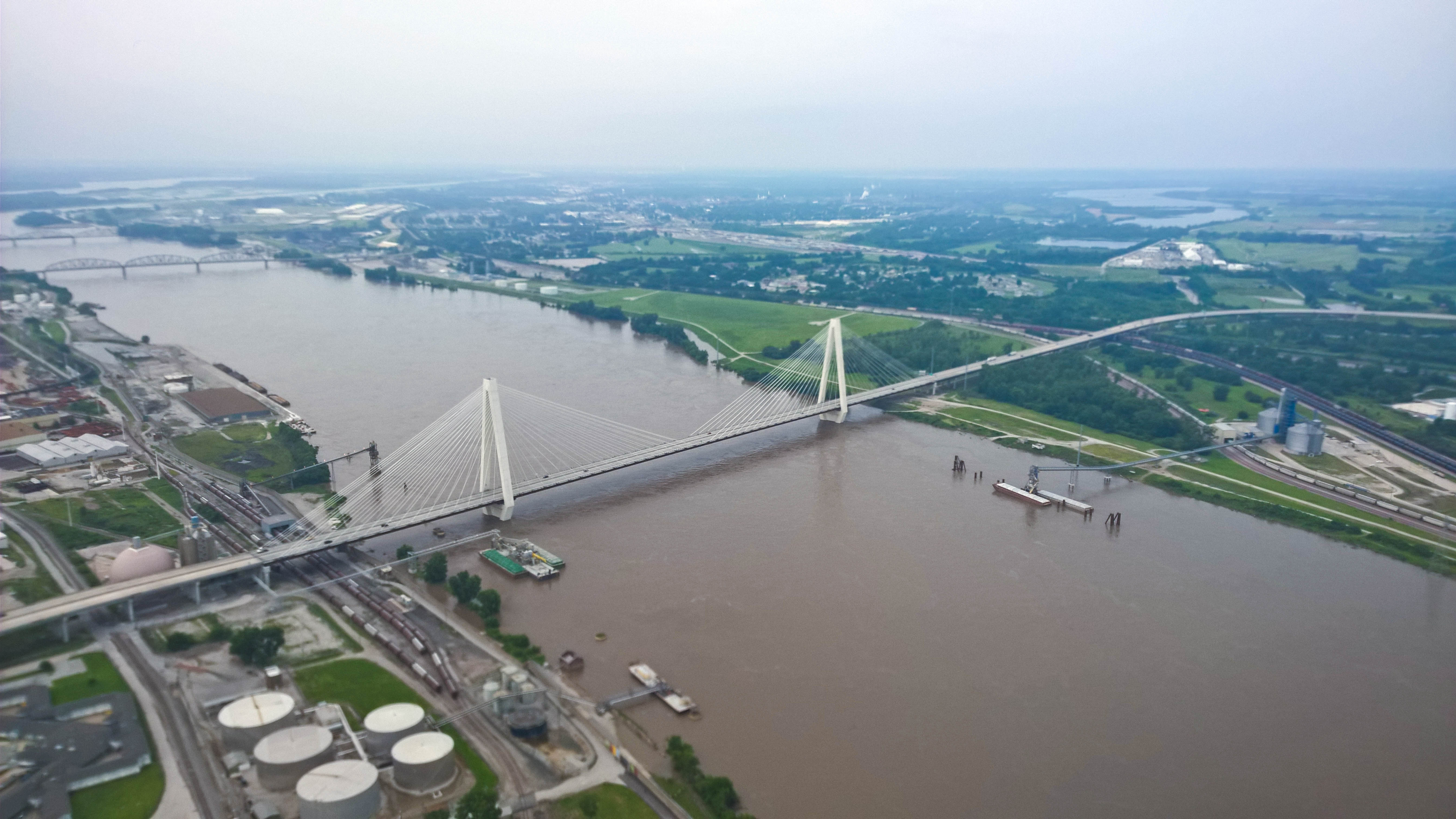
The Stan Musial Veterans Memorial Bridge at St. Louis

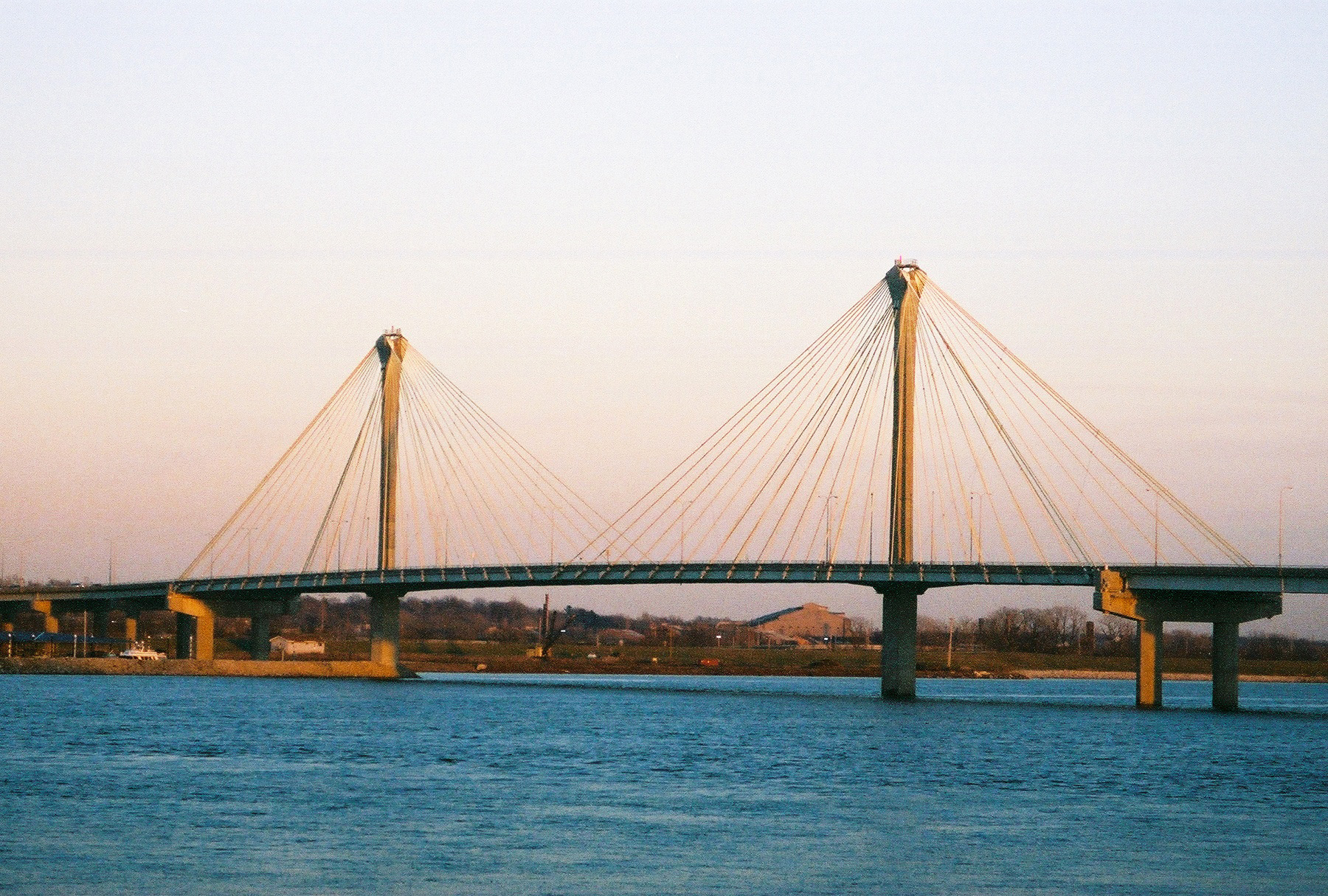
The Clark Bridge carries U.S. Highway 67 across the Mississippi River

The Greater St. Louis region is surrounded by rivers, creeks, and other tributaries requiring multiple bridges and viaducts to travel across the bi-state area. The largest of these bridges carry interstates across rivers while the smaller viaducts carry major local routes over creeks, railroads, and other obstructions. Missouri's only traffic tunnel carries Lindbergh Boulevard under Runway 11/29 at St. Louis-Lambert International Airport.

Major bridges, viaducts, and tunnels in Greater St. Louis
**Mississippi River**	**Missouri River**	**Viaducts**
**Clark Bridge**; **Eads Bridge**; Jefferson Barracks Bridge; Martin Luther King Bridge; **McKinley Bridge**; New Chain of Rocks Bridge; **Old Chain of Rocks Bridge**; Poplar Street Bridge; Stan Musial Veterans Memorial Bridge	Blanchette Memorial Bridge; **Daniel Boone Bridge**; **Discovery Bridge**; Lewis Bridge; **Veterans Memorial Bridge**; **Washington Bridge**	Creve Coeur Lake; **Grand Boulevard**; **Jefferson Avenue**; **South Kingshighway**; Third Street; **Tucker Boulevard**
**Clark Bridge**; **Eads Bridge**; Jefferson Barracks Bridge; Martin Luther King Bridge; **McKinley Bridge**; New Chain of Rocks Bridge; **Old Chain of Rocks Bridge**; Poplar Street Bridge; Stan Musial Veterans Memorial Bridge	Blanchette Memorial Bridge; **Daniel Boone Bridge**; **Discovery Bridge**; Lewis Bridge; **Veterans Memorial Bridge**; **Washington Bridge**	**Tunnels**
**Clark Bridge**; **Eads Bridge**; Jefferson Barracks Bridge; Martin Luther King Bridge; **McKinley Bridge**; New Chain of Rocks Bridge; **Old Chain of Rocks Bridge**; Poplar Street Bridge; Stan Musial Veterans Memorial Bridge	Blanchette Memorial Bridge; **Daniel Boone Bridge**; **Discovery Bridge**; Lewis Bridge; **Veterans Memorial Bridge**; **Washington Bridge**	Lindbergh Boulevard Tunnel
**Clark Bridge**; **Eads Bridge**; Jefferson Barracks Bridge; Martin Luther King Bridge; **McKinley Bridge**; New Chain of Rocks Bridge; **Old Chain of Rocks Bridge**; Poplar Street Bridge; Stan Musial Veterans Memorial Bridge	Blanchette Memorial Bridge; **Daniel Boone Bridge**; **Discovery Bridge**; Lewis Bridge; **Veterans Memorial Bridge**; **Washington Bridge**	**Demolished or closed**
**Clark Bridge**; **Eads Bridge**; Jefferson Barracks Bridge; Martin Luther King Bridge; **McKinley Bridge**; New Chain of Rocks Bridge; **Old Chain of Rocks Bridge**; Poplar Street Bridge; Stan Musial Veterans Memorial Bridge	Blanchette Memorial Bridge; **Daniel Boone Bridge**; **Discovery Bridge**; Lewis Bridge; **Veterans Memorial Bridge**; **Washington Bridge**	Clark Bridge (1928); Daniel Boone Bridge (1937); Old Meramec River Bridge (1931); St. Charles Bridge (1904); Washington Bridge (1934)
**Bold indicates bridges and viaducts with dedicated facilities for pedestrians and/or bicycles.**

== Public transportation ==
=== Bus ===
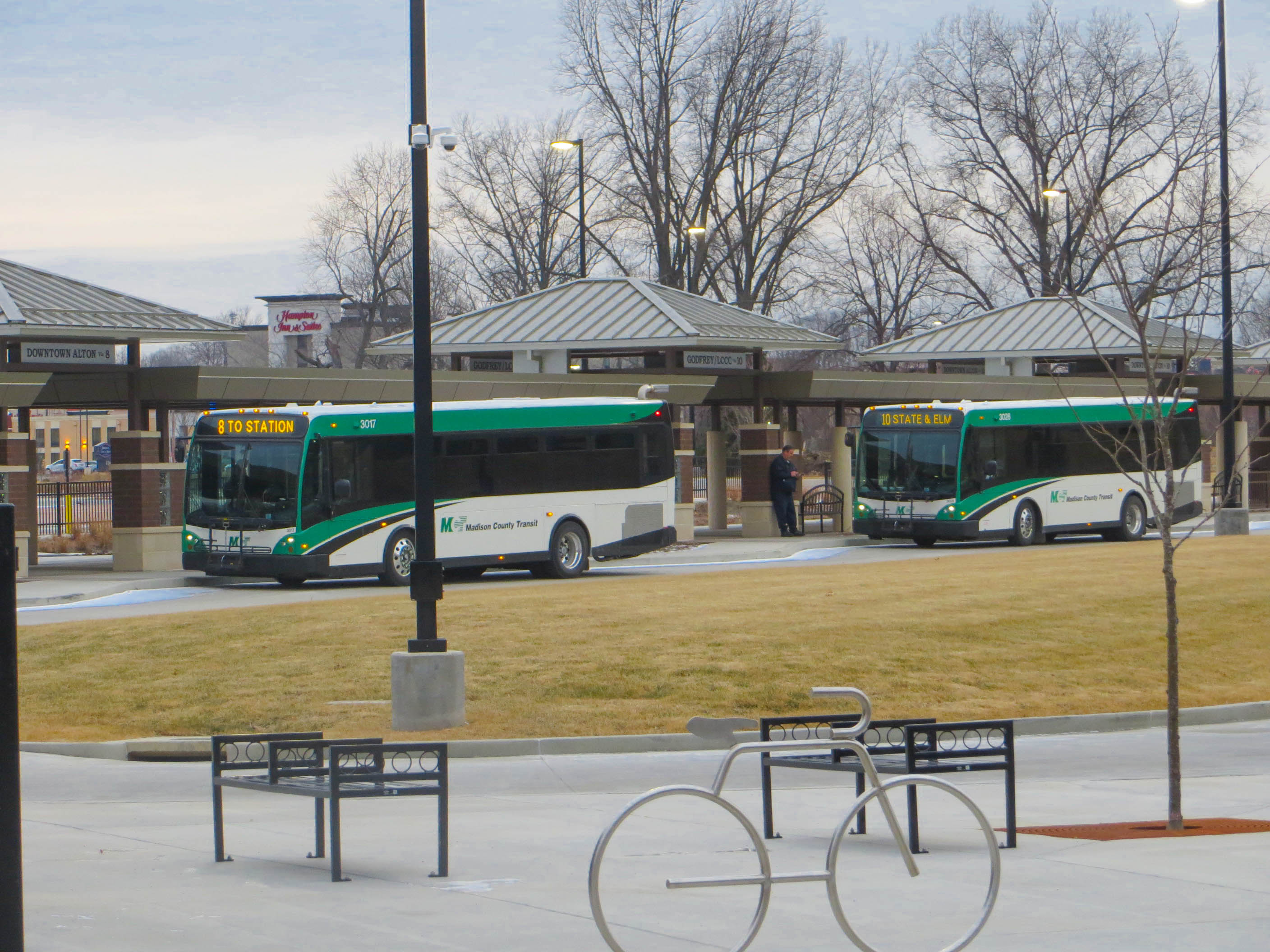
Two Madison County Transit buses in Alton, Illinois

Local bus service in the greater St. Louis region is provided by MetroBus and Madison County Transit. MetroBus has 44 routes connecting destinations in the city of St. Louis and St. Louis County in addition to 14 routes connecting destinations in St. Clair County, Illinois. Madison County Transit has 18 local routes connecting destinations across Madison and St. Clair counties in Illinois and four express routes that provide service to downtown St. Louis.

As of 2025, Metro and the City of St. Louis are studying a potential bus rapid transit line along Jefferson Avenue.

=== Light rail ===
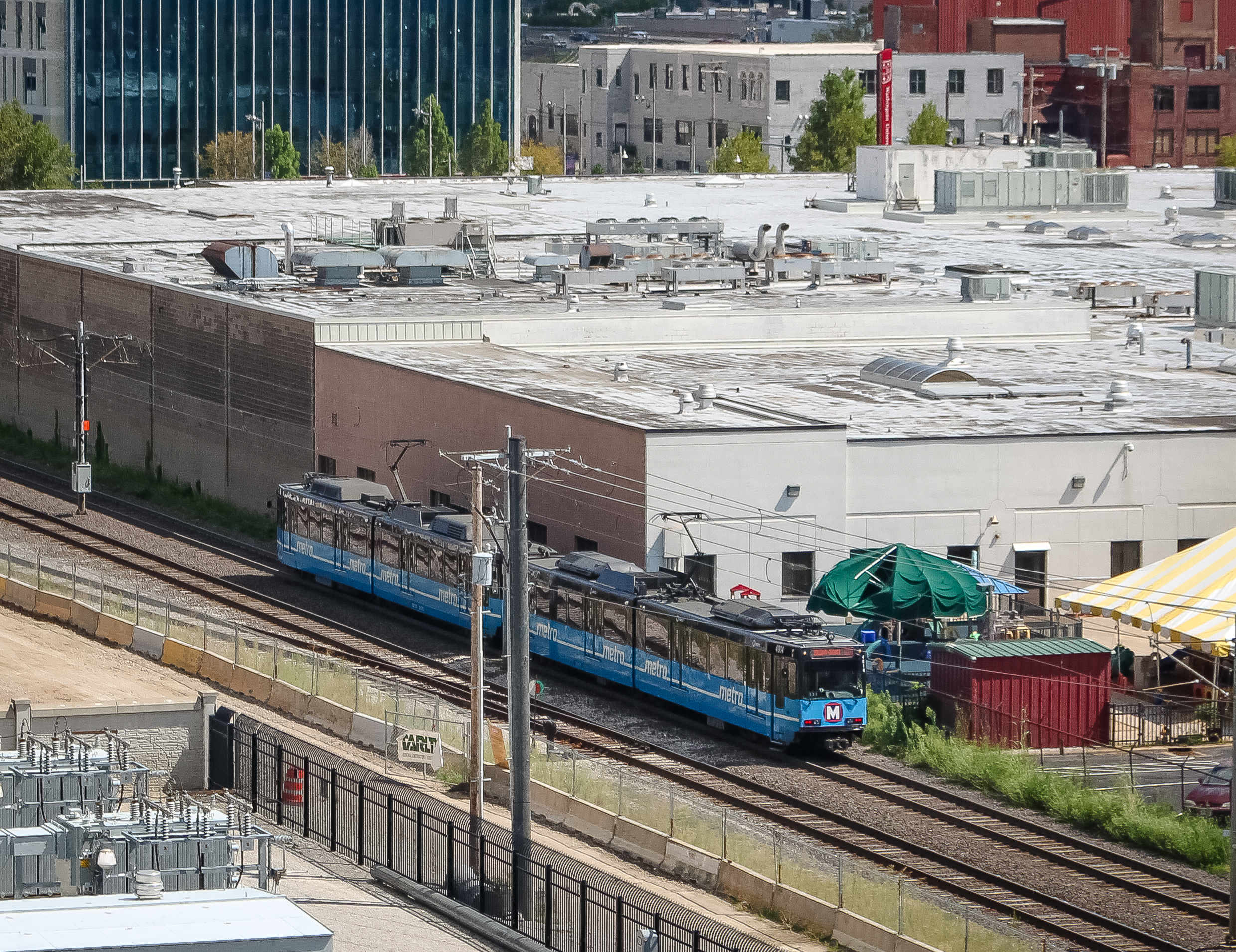
A Red Line train traveling through the Central West End

Fixed rail public transportation in the Greater St. Louis region is provided by the MetroLink light rail system (commonly referred to as "Metro"). Operated by Metro Transit in a shared fare system with MetroBus. All lines enter the city on its western edge north of Forest Park or on the Eads Bridge in downtown St. Louis from Illinois. The whole system operates in an independent right of way, with at-grade, elevated, and subway track in the region. All stations are independent entry and all platforms feature level boarding with trains. Rail service is provided by Metro Transit, an enterprise of the Bi-State Development Agency, and is funded by sales taxes levied in the city and St. Louis and St. Clair counties.

A 5.2-mile (8.4 km) extension of the Red Line from Shiloh-Scott to MidAmerica St. Louis Airport in Mascoutah broke ground in 2023 and is expected to be operational by 2026.

=== Loop Trolley ===
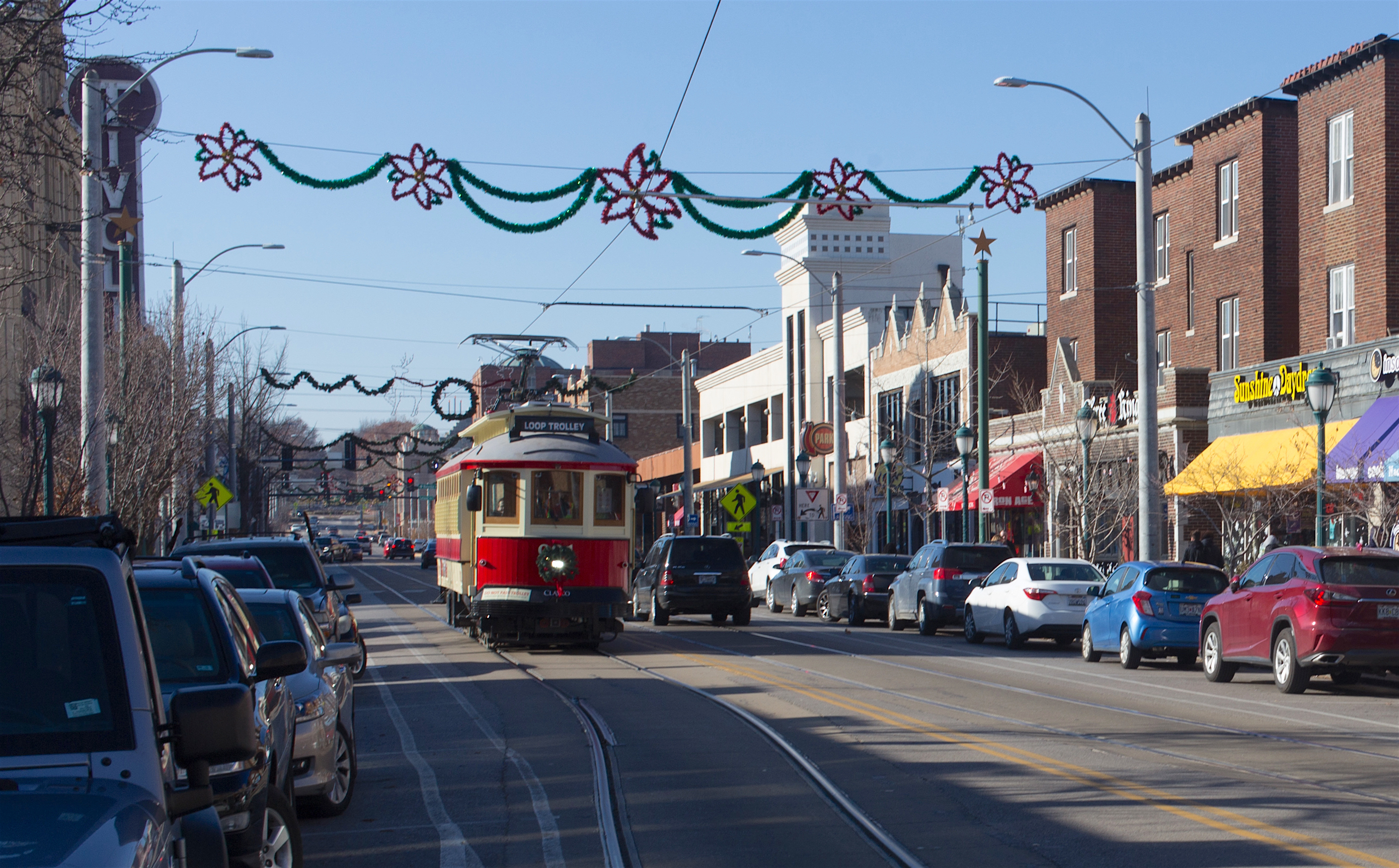
The Loop Trolley near Limit Avenue in University City

The Loop Trolley is a 2.2-mile (3.5 km), 10-station heritage streetcar line that runs from City Hall in University City to the Missouri History Museum in St. Louis' Forest Park. The line travels along Delmar Bouleverd through the popular Delmar Loop district and DeBaliviere Avenue between Delmar and Forest Park. The trolley has stops at both the Forest Park-DeBaliviere and Delmar Loop MetroLink stations. On February 18, 2022, Metro Transit's board voted to take over operation of the Loop Trolley after several financial setbacks and closures. Metro reopened the Loop Trolley for operation on August 4, 2022. On August 21, 2022, the East-West Gateway Council of Governments voted to award Metro a $1.26 million grant to continue to operate the trolley on a seasonal schedule for the next several years.

=== National connections ===
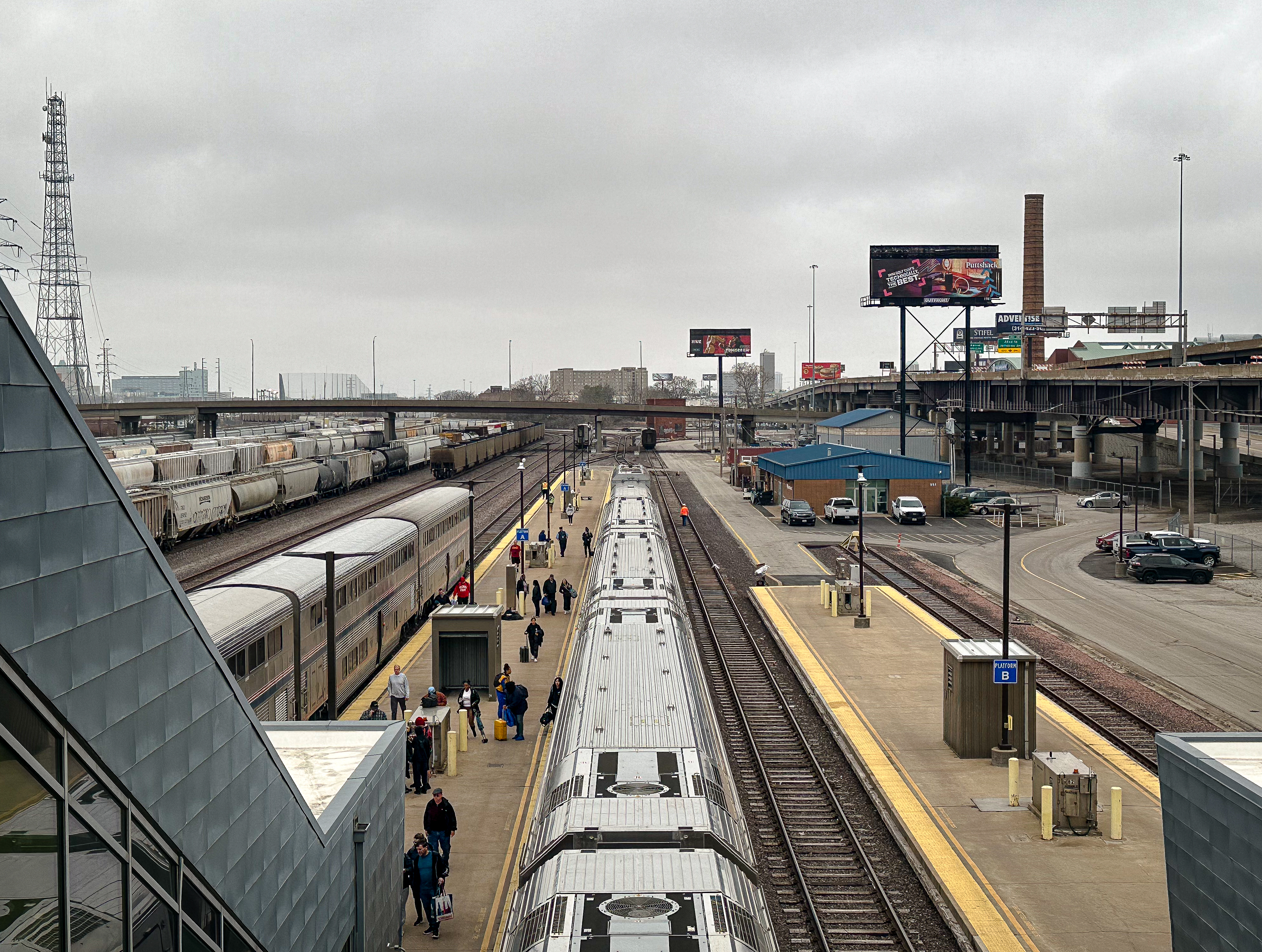
Amtrak platforms at the Gateway Transportation Center

The Gateway Transportation Center functions as the region's primary transportation hub, linking the city's light rail system, local bus systems, passenger rail service, and national bus service in one central station. Passenger rail service is provided by Amtrak with trains to Chicago via the Lincoln Service, to Kansas City via the Missouri River Runner, and to San Antonio via the Texas Eagle. National bus service in the city is provided by Greyhound Lines, Amtrak Thruway, and Megabus.

=== Rideshare and taxis ===
Taxicab service in the region is provided by private companies regulated by the Metropolitan Taxicab Commission. Rates vary by vehicle type, size, passengers and distance, and by regulation all taxicab fares must be calculated using a taximeter and be payable in cash or credit card. Solicitation by a driver is prohibited, although a taxicab may be hailed on the street or at a stand. The St. Louis region is also served by rideshare companies like Lyft, Uber, Lime, and Bird.

=== Ferries ===
The St. Louis metropolitan area is home to several ferry services that carry passengers across rivers between Missouri and Illinois. The seasonal Grafton Ferry travels across the Mississippi River between St. Charles, Missouri, and Grafton, Illinois, cutting travel times between the two communities by roughly 30 minutes. The Calhoun Ferry Company operates two ferry services on the Mississippi River. One is a year round service between St. Charles and Calhoun County called the Golden Eagle Ferry. The other operates between Winfield, Missouri, and Batchtown, Illinois, when demand is high enough to require it. The Illinois Department of Transportation also operates two free, year round ferries in the St. Louis area. The first is the Brussels Ferry that crosses the Illinois River just west of its confluence with the Mississippi near Grafton, while the second one crosses the Illinois River near Kampsville. Several local roads used to lead to now closed ferries and are still named as such: Dougherty Ferry Road, Lemay Ferry Road and Tesson Ferry Road.

== Bicycle and pedestrian ==
The St. Louis area is served by several systems of off-street shared-use paths, on-street bicycle lanes, and greenways providing residents alternative modes of transportation.

=== Bike St. Louis ===
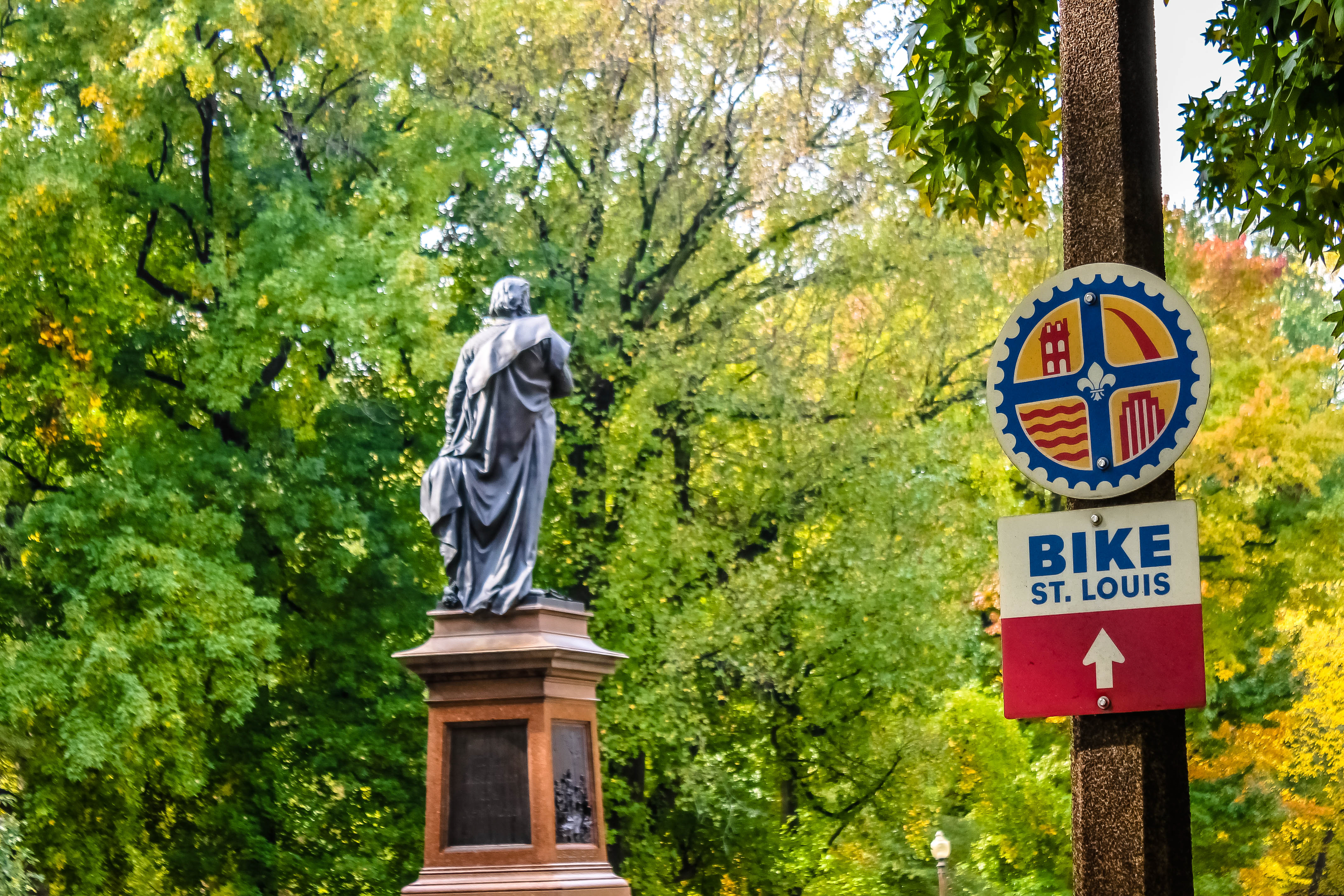
A Bike St. Louis sign in Tower Grove Park

Bike St. Louis is a plan sponsored by the city of St. Louis to make local neighborhoods more friendly for those who bicycle for transportation, fitness, or fun. Since its launch in 2000, more than 135 miles of cycling routes have been added to city streets.

=== Great Rivers Greenway District ===
The Great Rivers Greenway District was established in November 2000 by the passage of Proposition C – The Clean Water, Safe Parks and Community Trails Initiative – in the city of St. Louis, St. Louis County and St. Charles County, Missouri. Proposition C created a one tenth of one cent sales tax devoted to the creation of an interconnected system of greenways, parks and trails. In its first 20 years the agency has built more than 128 miles of greenways connecting parks, rivers, schools, neighborhoods, business districts and transit.

Major greenways include:

- Brickline Greenway - The plan for the Brickline Greenway, formerly known as the Chouteau Greenway, calls for 20 miles of trails and green space connecting 17 neighborhoods across the City of St. Louis. It will connect Fairground Park in the north to Tower Grove Park in the south and Forest Park in the west to Gateway Arch National Park in the east. The project planners aim to knit together diverse communities through the greenway to overcome barriers that have fragmented the city over time. The plan incorporates input from citizens on strategies to promote economic growth and equitable outcomes.
- Centennial Greenway - The Centennial Greenway will extend from Forest Park in the City of St. Louis to St. Charles County. Three sections have been completed. From Forest Park the trail runs through the Washington University campus to Delmar Boulevard and Vernon Avenue in University City. Another section extends from Shaw Park in Clayton north to Olive Boulevard. A third section goes from the Katy Trail to the St. Charles Heritage Museum and connects east across the Missouri River to Creve Coeur Lake Memorial Park via the Creve Coeur Connector Trail.
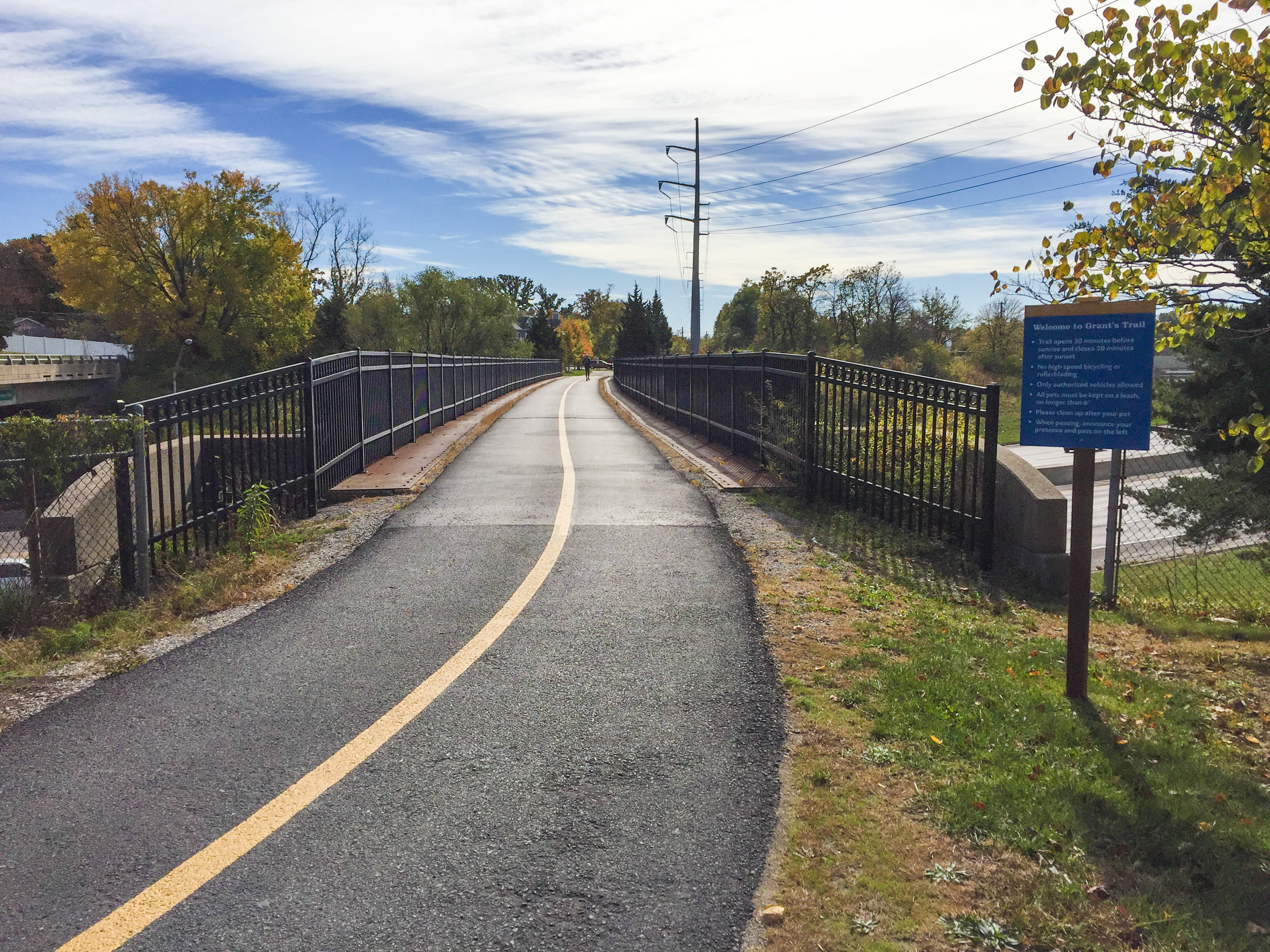
  Grant's Trail in Kirkwood, Missouri
- Gravois Greenway - Grant's Trail on the Gravois Greenway runs along Gravois Creek on the rail corridor of the former Kirkwood-Carondelet branch of the Missouri Pacific Railroad. Trailnet, a St. Louis-based organization that advocates for active communities and safe spaces for walking and bicycling, purchased the corridor in 1991 and built the first six miles of Grant's Trail which opened in 1994. Since 2006, Great Rivers Greenway has extended the trail to reach 10 miles from Kirkwood to the River des Peres Greenway near Interstate 55 and added two miles of trail in Officer Blake C. Snyder Memorial Park, adjacent to Grant's Trail. Points of interest on the greenway include the Ulysses S. Grant National Historic Site, Grant's Farm and the Thomas Sappington House Museum.
- Mississippi Greenway - The Mississippi Greenway, formerly known as the Confluence Greenway, is planned as a 32-mile corridor that will connect with the Missouri, Maline, River des Peres and Meramec Greenways. Three sections have been built. The Riverfront Trail runs from the downtown Mississippi riverfront north to the old Chain of Rocks Bridge. At 5,353 feet long, the old Chain of Rocks Bridge was part of Route 66 in 1936 and is one of the world's longest bicycle and pedestrian bridges. Another segment connects Jefferson Barracks County Park with River City Casino near the River des Peres Greenway. A third section runs through Cliff Cave County Park overlooking the Mississippi River.

=== Katy Trail ===
The Katy Trail (red) and the Missouri River (blue) on a map of Missouri

The Katy Trail is the country's longest recreational rail trail. It runs 240 miles (390 km), largely along the northern bank of the Missouri River, in the right-of-way of the former Missouri–Kansas–Texas Railroad. Open year-round from sunrise to sunset, it serves hikers, joggers, and cyclists. Its hard, flat surface is of "limestone pug" (crushed limestone).

It enters the St. Louis region near Washington, primarily running along the Missouri River passing through historic downtown St. Charles before terminating at Machens Road, 3-miles (4.8 km) from Portage Des Sioux. The Katy Trail connects to the local Great Rivers Greenway network at many points, including major bridges (Daniel Boone, Discovery, and Veterans Memorial) which provide access into St. Louis County.

Plans are underway to add another 144-mile (232 km) unused section of the Chicago, Rock Island and Pacific to Rock Island Trail State Park, which, with the Katy, would create a 450-mile (720 km) cross-state trail network.

== Airports ==
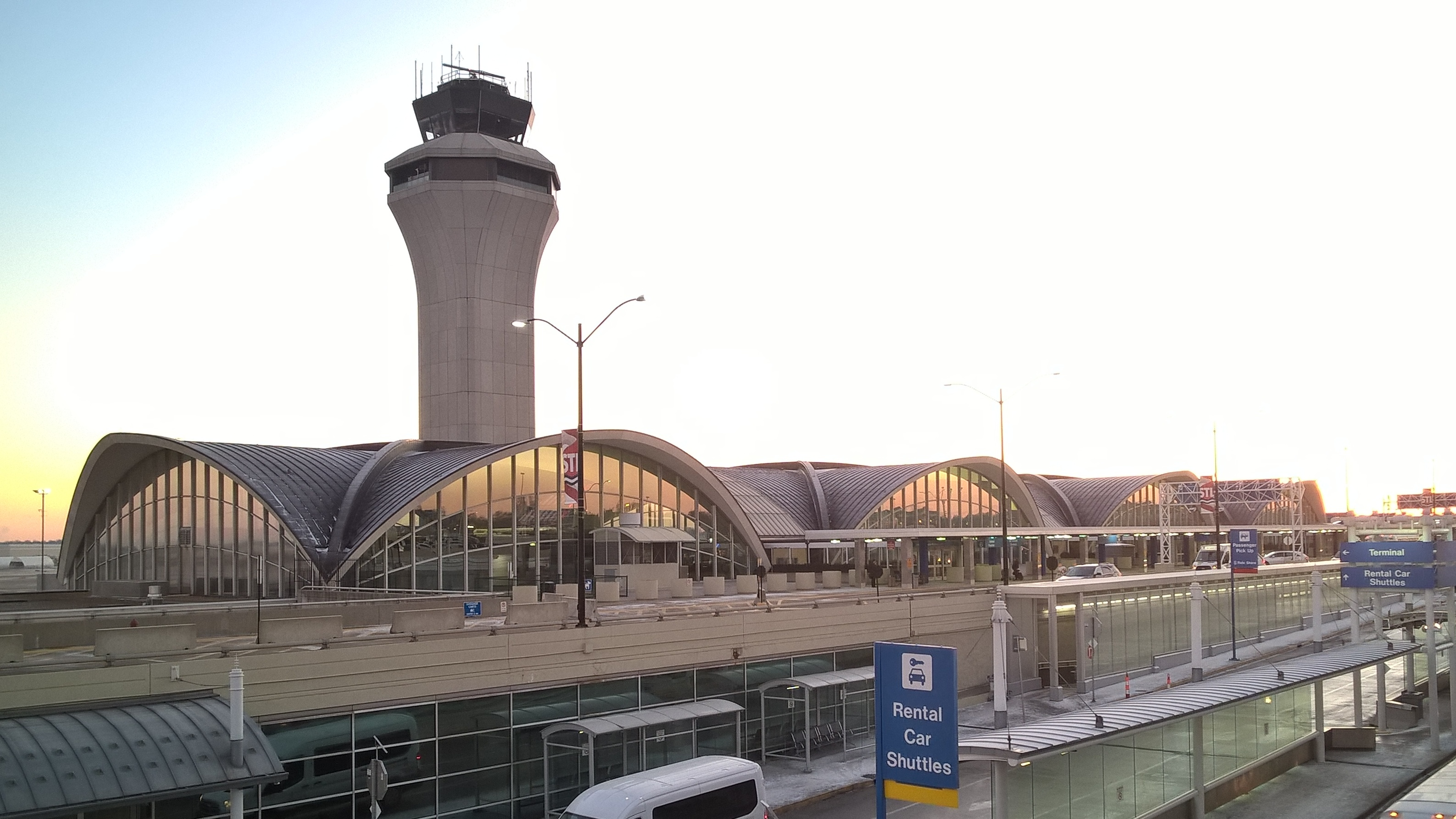
The Minoru Yamasaki designed Terminal 1 at St. Louis-Lambert International Airport

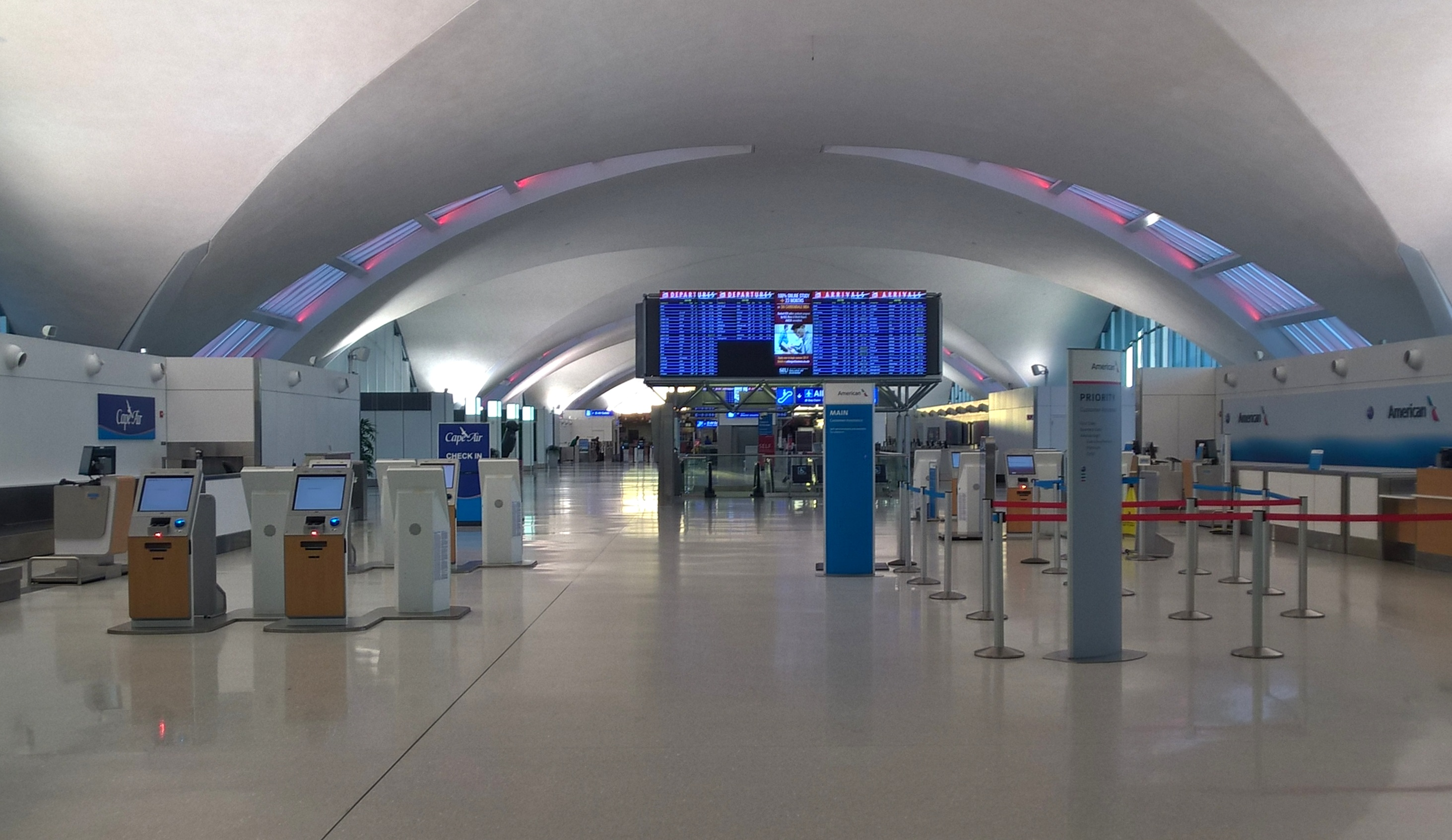
Terminal 1 ticketing level at St. Louis-Lambert International Airport

Greater St. Louis is served by over a dozen airports, although the vast majority of its air traffic is generated at St. Louis Lambert International Airport.

=== St. Louis Lambert International Airport (STL) ===
St. Louis Lambert International Airport, owned and operated by the city of St. Louis, is 14 miles (23 km) northwest of downtown along I-70 between I-170 and I-270 in St. Louis County. It is the largest and busiest airport in the state. In 2024, it served nearly 16 million passengers with more than 270 daily departures to 80 nonstop domestic and international locations. Named for Albert Bond Lambert, an Olympic medalist and prominent St. Louis aviator, the airport rose to international prominence in the 20th century thanks to its association with Charles Lindbergh, its groundbreaking air traffic control (ATC), its status as the primary hub of Trans World Airlines (TWA), and its iconic terminal. The airport's largest airline is Southwest Airlines with 63% of the market share followed by American Airlines with 13%.

=== MidAmerica St. Louis Airport (BLV) ===
MidAmerica St. Louis Airport is a public use airport next to Scott Air Force Base. It is 16 miles (26 km) east of the central business district of Belleville and 21 miles (33 km) east of downtown St. Louis in St. Clair County, Illinois. The airport is the secondary domestic passenger airport for the metropolitan area and has operated as a joint use airport since beginning operations in November 1997. MidAmerica is currently served by Allegiant Air and offers general aviation and cargo facilities and in 2024 saw 303,919 passengers. In 2021, construction began on a 41,000 square foot expansion of the terminal building that added two additional gates. It celebrated its grand opening in June 2023.

A 5.2-mile (8.4 km) extension of the MetroLink Red Line from Shiloh-Scott to MidAmerica is expected to open in 2026.

=== General aviation ===
Other airports serving the St. Louis metropolitan area include:

- Creve Coeur Airport
- Spirit of St. Louis Airport
- St. Charles County Smartt Airport
- St. Louis Downtown Airport
- St. Louis-Metro East Airport
- St. Louis Regional Airport

== Railroads ==
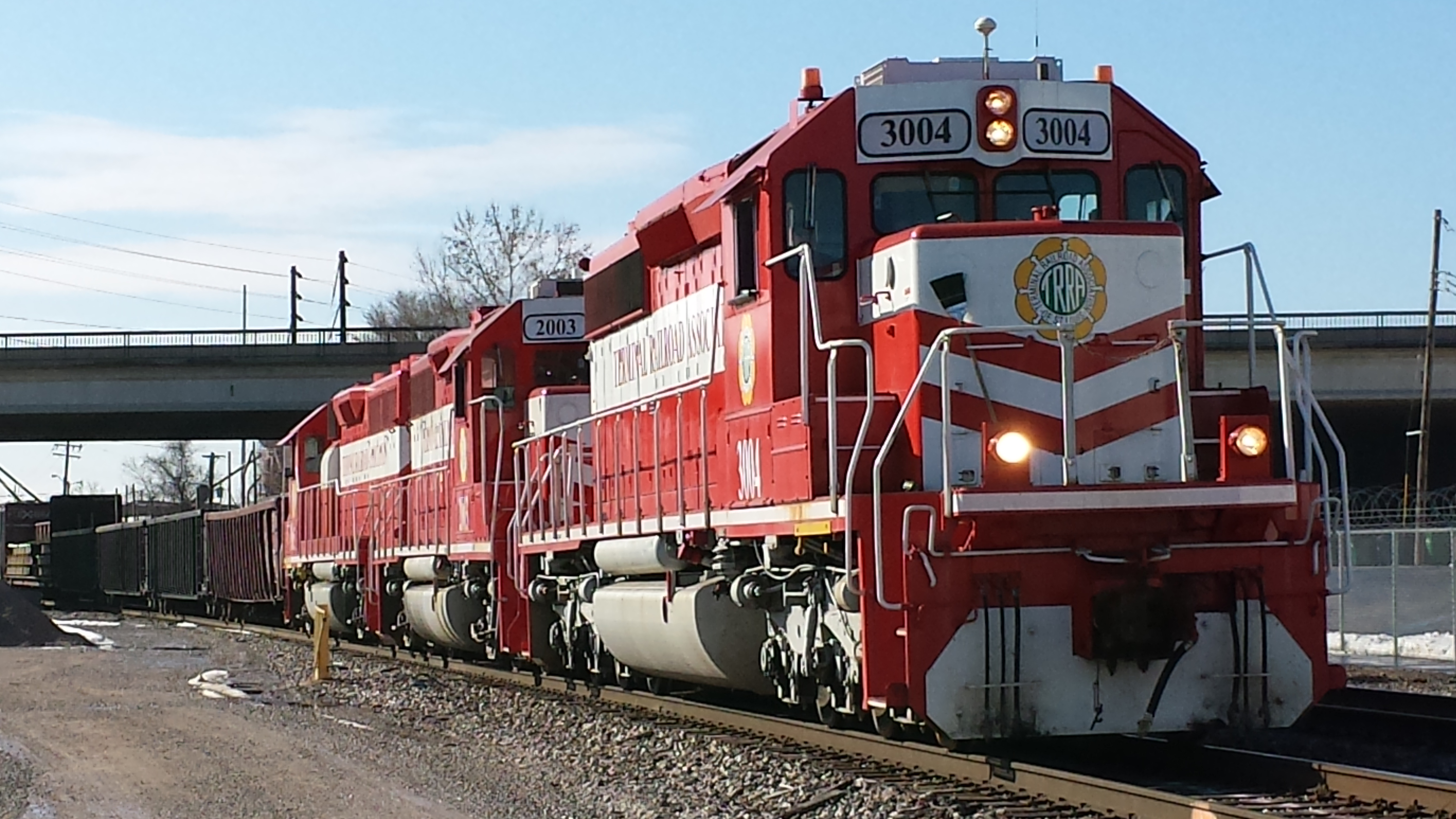
A Terminal Railroad Association of St. Louis locomotive

Greater St. Louis is the nation's third-largest rail hub with freight rail service provided on tracks owned by BNSF Railway, Canadian National Railway, CSX Transportation, Canadian Pacific Kansas City, Norfolk Southern Railway, Union Pacific Railroad, and the Terminal Railroad Association of St. Louis. The Terminal Railroad is a switching and terminal railroad jointly owned by all the major rail carriers in St. Louis. The company operates 30 diesel-electric locomotives to move railcars around the classification yards, deliver railcars to local industries, and ready trains for departure. The TRRA processes and dispatches a significant portion of railroad traffic in the metropolitan area and owns and operates a network of rail bridges and tunnels including the MacArthur Bridge and the Merchants Bridge.

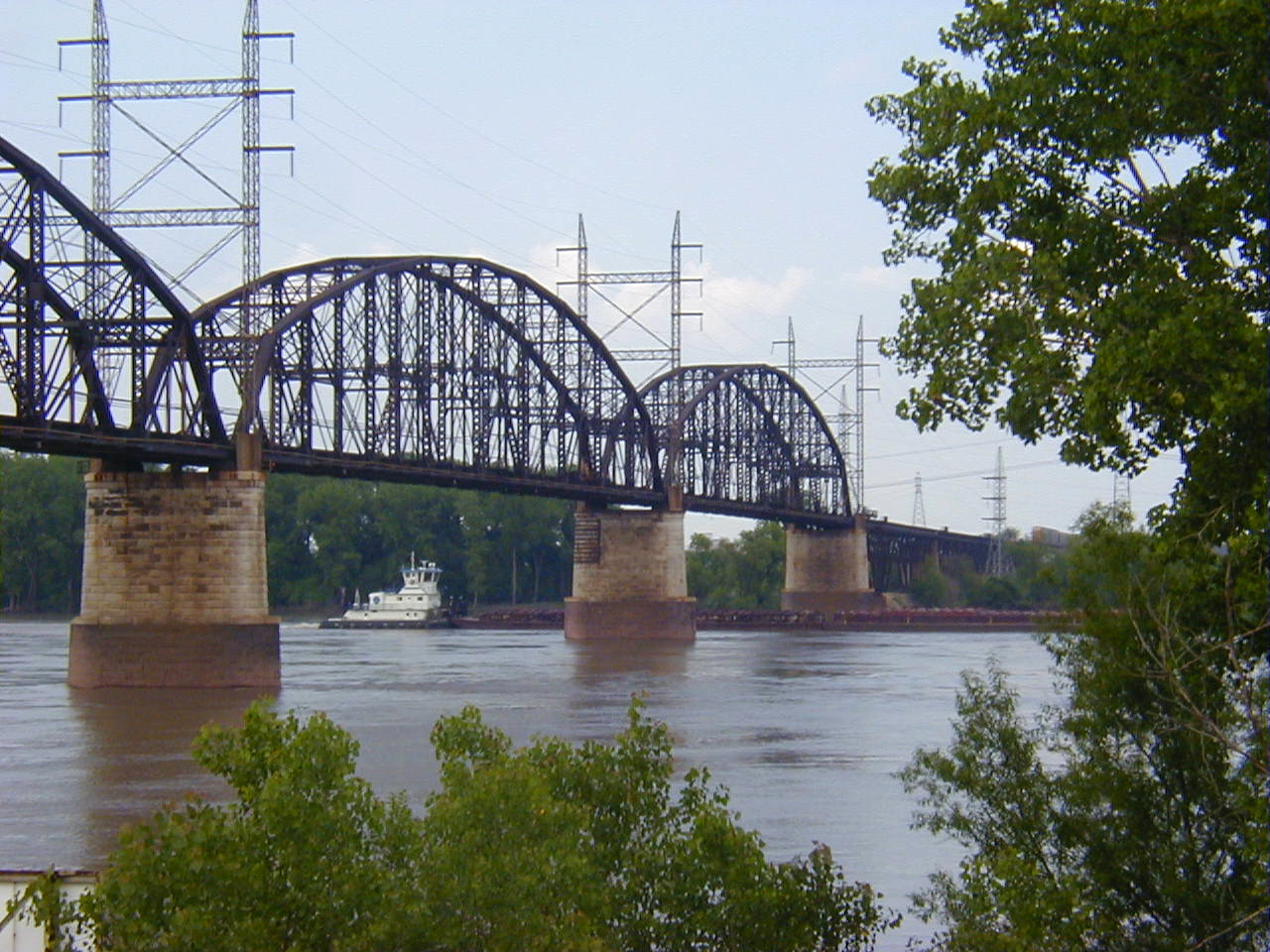
The Merchants Bridge prior to its 2022 reconstruction

Major railroad infrastructure in Greater St. Louis
Mississippi River	Stations	Classification yards
Eads Bridge; MacArthur Bridge; Merchants Bridge	Alton Station; Gateway Station; Kirkwood Station; St. Louis Union Station	BNSF Railway
Eads Bridge; MacArthur Bridge; Merchants Bridge	Alton Station; Gateway Station; Kirkwood Station; St. Louis Union Station	Chouteau Yard; Lindenwood Yard (I); North St. Louis Yard
Missouri River	Viaducts	Norfolk Southern Railway
Bellefontaine Bridge; Wabash Bridge	Brooklyn Flyover; Merchants Highline; Lesperance	Luther Yard (I)
Meramec River	Tunnels	Union Pacific Railroad
Hollywood Beach Bridge (BNSF); Meramec Crossing Bridge (UP); Meramec River Bridge (BNSF); Meramec River Bridge (UP); Moselle Crossing (BNSF); Sherman Beach Bridge (UP); Times Beach Bridge (BNSF); Valley Park Bridge (BNSF)	Arch Grounds Tunnels; Downtown Tunnel; Grey Summit Tunnel; Labadie Tunnel; Union Station Baggage Tunnel	12th Street Yard; Dupo Yard (I); Gateway Yard (ALS); Lesperance Yard
Hollywood Beach Bridge (BNSF); Meramec Crossing Bridge (UP); Meramec River Bridge (BNSF); Meramec River Bridge (UP); Moselle Crossing (BNSF); Sherman Beach Bridge (UP); Times Beach Bridge (BNSF); Valley Park Bridge (BNSF)	Closed or demolished	CSX Transportation
Hollywood Beach Bridge (BNSF); Meramec Crossing Bridge (UP); Meramec River Bridge (BNSF); Meramec River Bridge (UP); Moselle Crossing (BNSF); Sherman Beach Bridge (UP); Times Beach Bridge (BNSF); Valley Park Bridge (BNSF)	Barretts Tunnels; Iron Horse Trestle; Meramec Highlands Tunnel; Riverfront Trestle; Tucker Tunnel	Roselake Yard (I)
Hollywood Beach Bridge (BNSF); Meramec Crossing Bridge (UP); Meramec River Bridge (BNSF); Meramec River Bridge (UP); Moselle Crossing (BNSF); Sherman Beach Bridge (UP); Times Beach Bridge (BNSF); Valley Park Bridge (BNSF)	Barretts Tunnels; Iron Horse Trestle; Meramec Highlands Tunnel; Riverfront Trestle; Tucker Tunnel	Terminal Railroad
Hollywood Beach Bridge (BNSF); Meramec Crossing Bridge (UP); Meramec River Bridge (BNSF); Meramec River Bridge (UP); Moselle Crossing (BNSF); Sherman Beach Bridge (UP); Times Beach Bridge (BNSF); Valley Park Bridge (BNSF)	Barretts Tunnels; Iron Horse Trestle; Meramec Highlands Tunnel; Riverfront Trestle; Tucker Tunnel	Madison Yard
Kaskaskia River	Barretts Tunnels; Iron Horse Trestle; Meramec Highlands Tunnel; Riverfront Trestle; Tucker Tunnel	Madison Yard
Kaskaskia River Bridge	Barretts Tunnels; Iron Horse Trestle; Meramec Highlands Tunnel; Riverfront Trestle; Tucker Tunnel	Madison Yard
Italics indicate infrastructure currently in use by MetroLink		(I) indicates intermodal yard

== Port of Metropolitan St. Louis ==
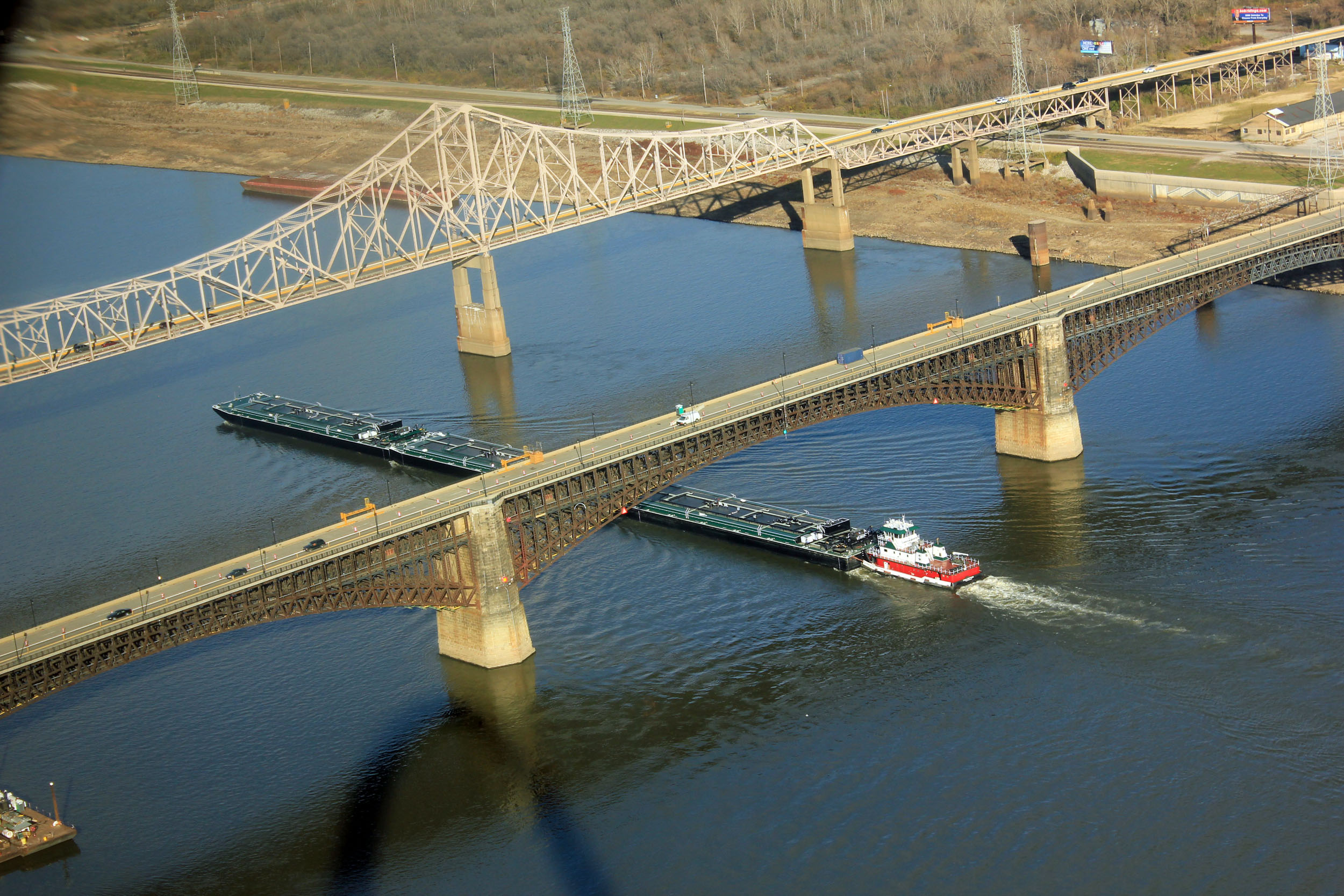
Barges pass beneath the Eads and Martin Luther King bridges at St. Louis

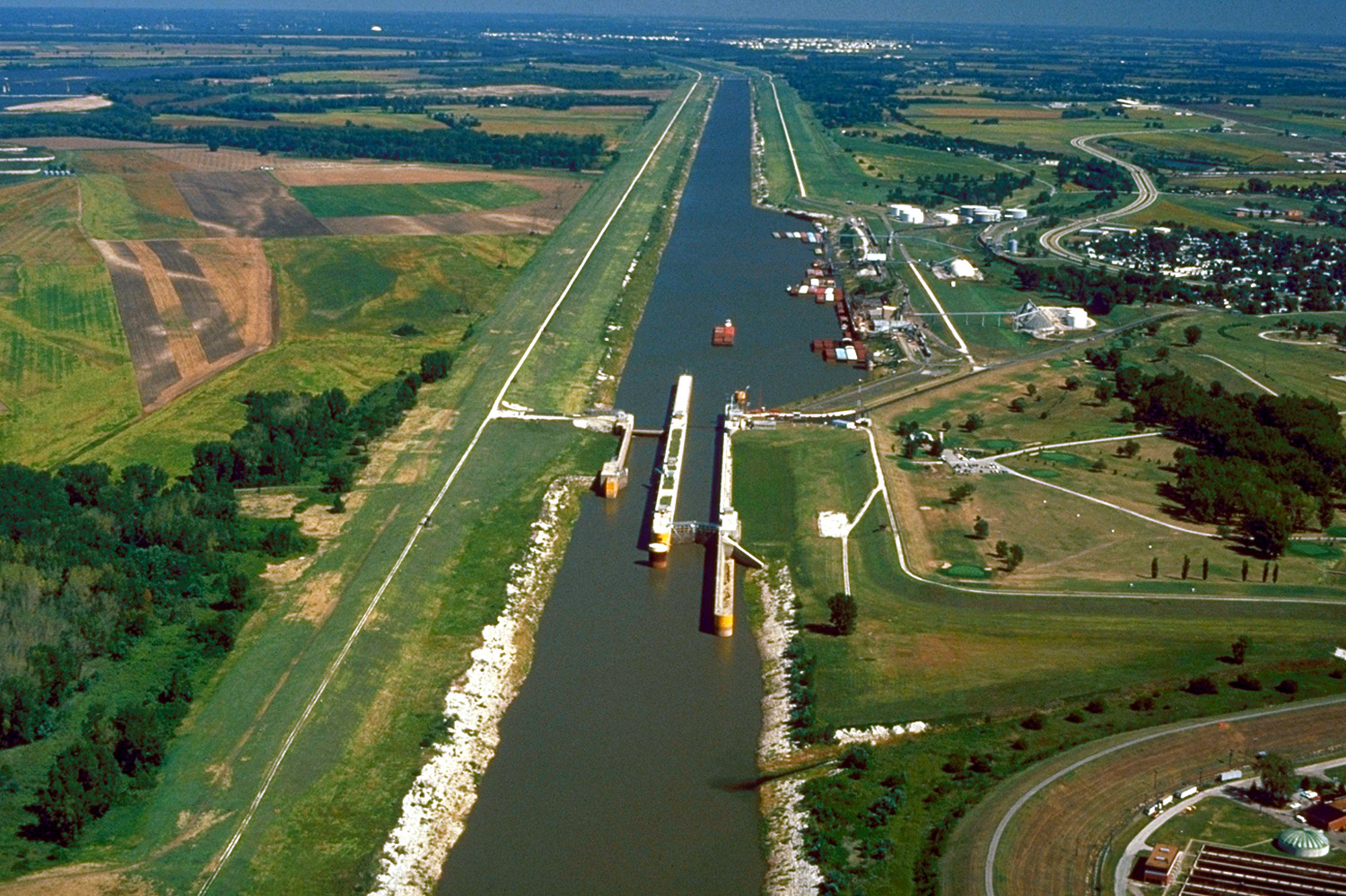
Lock 27 at the Chain of Rocks Canal

The Port of Metropolitan St. Louis offers a 15-mile stretch of the Mississippi River that is home to 16 barge-transfer facilities that, at total capacity, can handle 150 barges a day – the highest level of capacity anywhere along the Mississippi River.

The St. Louis region's port system is the second-largest inland port system in the United States, and was ranked the most efficient port system by the U.S. Army Corps of Engineers. The St. Louis regional port system is responsible for 8% of the 855 miles of the Mississippi River, but carries one-third of the river's total freight.

Other features of the Port of Metropolitan St. Louis include:

- Northernmost ice-free and lock-free port on the Mississippi River
- Served by six Class I railroads, seven interstates, and two international airports
- Access to two Foreign Trade Zones
- Includes the City of St. Louis Port District

Other port facilities in metropolitan St. Louis include America's Central Port in Granite City, Illinois, Kaskaskia Port in Randolph County, and the Municipal River Terminal in the city of St. Louis. In Jefferson County, Missouri, Hawtex Development Group hopes to develop a container-on-vessel port at Herculaneum's Riverview Commerce Park. The proposed port would cover approximately 300 acres and open in late 2024.

The Chain of Rocks Canal and Locks No. 27 allow river traffic to bypass a portion of the Mississippi River that is unnavigable in low water due to an anticlinal exposure of bedrock in the river—a "chain of rocks". The 8.4-mile (13.5 km) canal, 1,200-foot (370 m) main lock, and 600-foot (180 m) auxiliary lock opened in the early 1950s to allow a bypass of the Chain of Rocks lying in the main channel of the Mississippi River. Locks No. 27 are the only locks south of the confluence of the Mississippi River and Missouri River. As such, the locks move more cargo than any other navigation structure on the river.

=== St. Louis Regional Freightway ===
An enterprise of the Bi-State Development Agency, the Regional Freightway was founded in 2014 to enhance the St. Louis region's standing as an international freight hub. The Freightway works to optimize the region's freight network and strengthen modal flexibility, support workforce development initiatives that build our talent supply chain, and raise awareness about the global connectivity the St. Louis region offers.

== Current and future projects ==
=== Bridges and highways ===
==== Chain of Rocks Bridge ====
On August 23, 2022, the Missouri and Illinois departments of transportation awarded contracts worth $531.6 million to replace the "New" Chain of Rocks Bridge and interchange at Riverview Drive. Construction began in early 2023 with an opening expected in 2026. The replacement bridge will include space for six 12-foot lanes and four 10-foot shoulders.

=== Light rail ===
==== MetroLink rehabilitation ====
In 2023, Metro began a system-wide rehabilitation program that will last several years. That spring, Metro began rehabilitating the downtown subway tunnels, including the Laclede's Landing, Convention Center, and 8th & Pine stations. Elsewhere, catenary wire, curve tracks, platforms, retaining walls, staircases, and system conduit are to be upgraded or replaced.

Beginning in 2025, Metro will start rehabilitating the Union Station tunnel with rehabilitation of the Cross County tunnels beginning in 2026. The latter will include the renovation of the Skinker and University City–Big Bend subway stations and the construction of a storage siding near the Richmond Heights station. In 2026, Metro expects to complete upgrades to the Supervisory Control Automated Data Acquisition (SCADA) and Public Address/Customer Information (PA/CIS) systems. The upgraded SCADA/PA/CIS will operate as an integrated system that monitors and controls operations and will allow Metro to provide real-time arrival information to passengers, such as live displays at stations.

==== MidAmerica Airport extension ====
In 2019, the St. Clair County Transit District was awarded $96 million in Illinois infrastructure funding to build a 5.2-mile (8.4 km) extension of the Red Line from Shiloh-Scott to MidAmerica St. Louis Airport in Mascoutah. This extension will include two 2.6-mile (4.2 km) segments, a double-track and a single-track segment, along with a station at the airport. Construction on the extension began in 2023 with Metro expecting to begin operations in early 2026.

==== Secure Platform Plan ====
In 2024, Metro Transit began adding turnstiles at all MetroLink stations as part of its $52 million Secure Platform Plan (SPP). Stations will also receive a new fare collection system, more fences, passenger-assist telephones, and more than 1,800 cameras to be monitored at a center opened in November 2022 at Metro's Central Garage.

The SPP will be implemented in three "packages" with full operation expected to begin in 2026. In September 2023, Bi-State awarded a $6.4 million contract to Millstone Weber LLC for the first package covering four Illinois stations.The gates at these first four stations began operating in September 2024. However, due to delays in implementing a new fare collection system, Metro staff will operate the fare gates manually at first. The second package covers seven Missouri stations and is also slated for completion by early 2025. The remaining stations and the upgraded fare collection system are expected to be operational by early 2026.

==== North-South MetroLink ====
Green Line project logo

In 2022, Metro proposed the Green Line, a north-south on-street light rail line that would have lacked the rapid transit-like characteristics of the existing MetroLink system, instead resembling other U.S. on-street light rail lines. Running 5.6 miles (9.0 km) primarily on Jefferson Avenue, the line would have served about 10 stations between Chippewa Street in South St. Louis and Grand Boulevard in North St. Louis. In September 2023, Bi-State Development's board approved a 4-year, $18.9 million contract with the joint venture Northside-Southside Transit Partners to provide consulting services for the design phase of the project. The 2023 design study estimated 5,000 daily boardings, $8–9 million in annual operating costs, and $1.1 billion in capital costs.

In September 2025, Metro and St. Louis officials cancelled the Green Line project primarily due to cost concerns. That month's Bi-State Development board meeting saw commissioners vote to update the Program Management Consultant contract to evaluate alternative options for the project, with a focus on bus rapid transit. In that same meeting commissioners approved a study for bus rapid transit in the Jefferson corridor, a project that could cost between $400 and $450 million.

An extension of the Green Line into North St. Louis County had been explored. In 2023, four alternatives were proposed that would have continued the line from the Grand/Fairground station along Natural Bridge Avenue toward the county.By 2024, County leadership had rejected all four routes primarily due to the unfunded 3-mile (4.8 km) gap between the Grand/Fairground station and the county line. Additionally, concerns were raised about federal funding, ridership, right-of-way constraints and other factors.

=== Lambert Airport ===
In early 2022, airport officials released an updated master plan that would consolidate both existing terminals at the current Terminal 1 site. The proposal would gradually demolish concourses A, B, and C and build a new linear concourse with 62 gates in their place, while retaining the iconic domed terminal building. Following the consolidation, Terminal 2 would be repurposed. In 2023, the Federal Aviation Administration approved the consolidated terminal master plan. Additionally, the airport and its partner airlines agreed to fund $331 million in modernization projects that will eventually make way for the new terminal. In 2024, the airport and its partner airlines agreed to an additional $650 million in enabling projects including full design for the new terminal project.

== See also ==
- Bi-State Development Agency
- St. Clair County Transit District
