= Missouri Route 364 =

State highway in Missouri, U.S.

Route 364
- Page Freeway
- MO 364 highlighted in red

Route information
- Maintained by MoDOT
- Length: 21.384 mi (34.414 km)
- Existed: 2003–present

Major junctions
- West end: I-64 / US 40 / US 61 / Route N in Lake St. Louis
- Route 94 from St. Peters to St. Charles; Route 141 in Creve Coeur
- East end: I-270 / Route D in Maryland Heights

Location
- Country: United States
- State: Missouri

Highway system
- Missouri State Highway System; Interstate; US; State; Supplemental
← Route 360	→ Route 366

Route 364, known locally as the Page Extension, the Page Freeway, the Page Expressway, or simply the Extension, is a freeway that connects St. Louis County in Maryland Heights with St. Charles County in Lake St. Louis via the Veterans Memorial Bridge over the Missouri River. The highway is a designated auxiliary state route of I-64.

== Route description ==
Missouri Route 364 runs roughly 21 miles through suburban St. Louis and St. Charles Counties. Its western terminus is an interchange with Interstate 64, U.S. Routes 40 and 61, and Route N in Lake St. Louis, and its eastern terminus is an interchange with Interstate 270 and Route D, which carries Page Avenue east into St. Louis.

Construction progressed west throughout the 2000s and early 2010s, with two changes to the western terminus of the route. The first phase of construction was completed with a western terminus at Route 94 in St. Charles; the freeway opened to traffic on December 14, 2003. In 2012, upgrades to the Route 94 corridor were completed, and Route 364 was signed with Route 94 on a 5-mile concurrency; the western terminus was moved to the intersection at Mid Rivers Mall Drive and Pitman Hill Road. The final section of freeway northwest of Route 94 was opened to traffic on November 2, 2014, carrying the freeway to its final western terminus at I-64, U.S. 40, U.S. 61 and Route N in Lake St. Louis.

Missouri Route 364 serves as an alternate route of Interstate 64 to Interstate 270 through the rapidly developing suburbs in St. Charles County and western St. Louis County.

=== Interstate 64 to Route 94 ===
Route 364 begins at a cloverleaf interchange in Lake St. Louis with I-64, U.S. 40, U.S. 61 and Route N. From this point until Route 94, Route 364 is a semi-rural freeway with two lanes in each direction with a wide, grassy median between the carriageways. From I-64, the freeway turns east-southeast into Dardenne Prairie and has another interchange with Route N. From that intersection, the highway continues southeast for two miles and has a SPUI Interchange with Route K. The highway then continues several miles before entering the city limits of Cottleville. The route curves slightly to the south, crossing over a few roads and interchanging with Gutermuth Road before turning northeast toward Route 94.

=== Concurrency with Route 94 ===
Route 94 joins Route 364 through several miles of suburban developments in St. Charles County after its initial interchange. The freeway widens from just two lanes in each direction to four, and the wide, grassy median is replaced by a barrier. In St. Peters, the route interchanges with Kisker Road and Central School Road immediately after the concurrency with Route 94 begins, and then curves slightly to the northeast where it interchanges with Jungermann Road. The interchanges that take place through St. Peters and part of St. Charles utilize collector-distributor roads to the north and south of the highway, named North St. Peters Parkway and South St. Peters Parkway, respectively. The route then curves northeast, and then back towards the east before interchanging with Woodstone Drive, Harvester Road, Jungs Station Road and Heritage Crossing, all of which are accessed via St. Peters Parkway. After these intersections, the highway briefly enters the St. Charles city limits and interchanges with Route 94 and Muegge Road, marking the eastern end of the concurrency with Route 94. From there, Route 94 turns northeast into St. Charles, while Route 364 turns to the southeast towards the Missouri River.

=== Route 94 to Route 141 ===
South of the interchange with Route 94 and Muegge Road, Route 364 has a diamond interchange with Upper Bottom Road. Immediately after this interchange, the Veterans Memorial Bridge carries ten lanes of Route 364 over the Missouri River, where it enters St. Louis County and the Maryland Heights city limits. The opening of the bridge increased the number of lanes across the Missouri River in the St. Louis metropolitan area from 23 to 33.

After crossing the river, the highway descends into the floodplain southeast of the river, through which it continues southeast for a few miles before turning due east and interchanging with Route 141, which at that point is also designated as Maryland Heights Expressway.

=== Route 141 to Interstate 270 ===
East of the interchange with Route 141, Route 364 climbs out of the floodplain via a bridge carrying the highway over the southern tip of Creve Coeur Lake. The ten-lane freeway winds through the Maryland Heights suburbs for a few miles, crossing under overpasses at Seven Pines Drive and Amiot Drive before interchanging with Bennington Place, which runs north through residential Maryland Heights and south to Fee Fee Road in Creve Coeur. The route turns east-northeast for its final stretch before terminating at a modified cloverleaf intersection with Interstate 270.

Beyond the Interstate 270 interchange, Route 364 ends and continues as a freeway for roughly one mile signed as Route D and Page Avenue, with ramps departing for Westport Plaza Drive and Lackland Road. The freeway ends at a signalized intersection with Schuetz Road in Maryland Heights. Route D continues as an expressway for about another mile before interchanging with U.S. 67 (Lindbergh Boulevard) and becoming a road.

== History ==
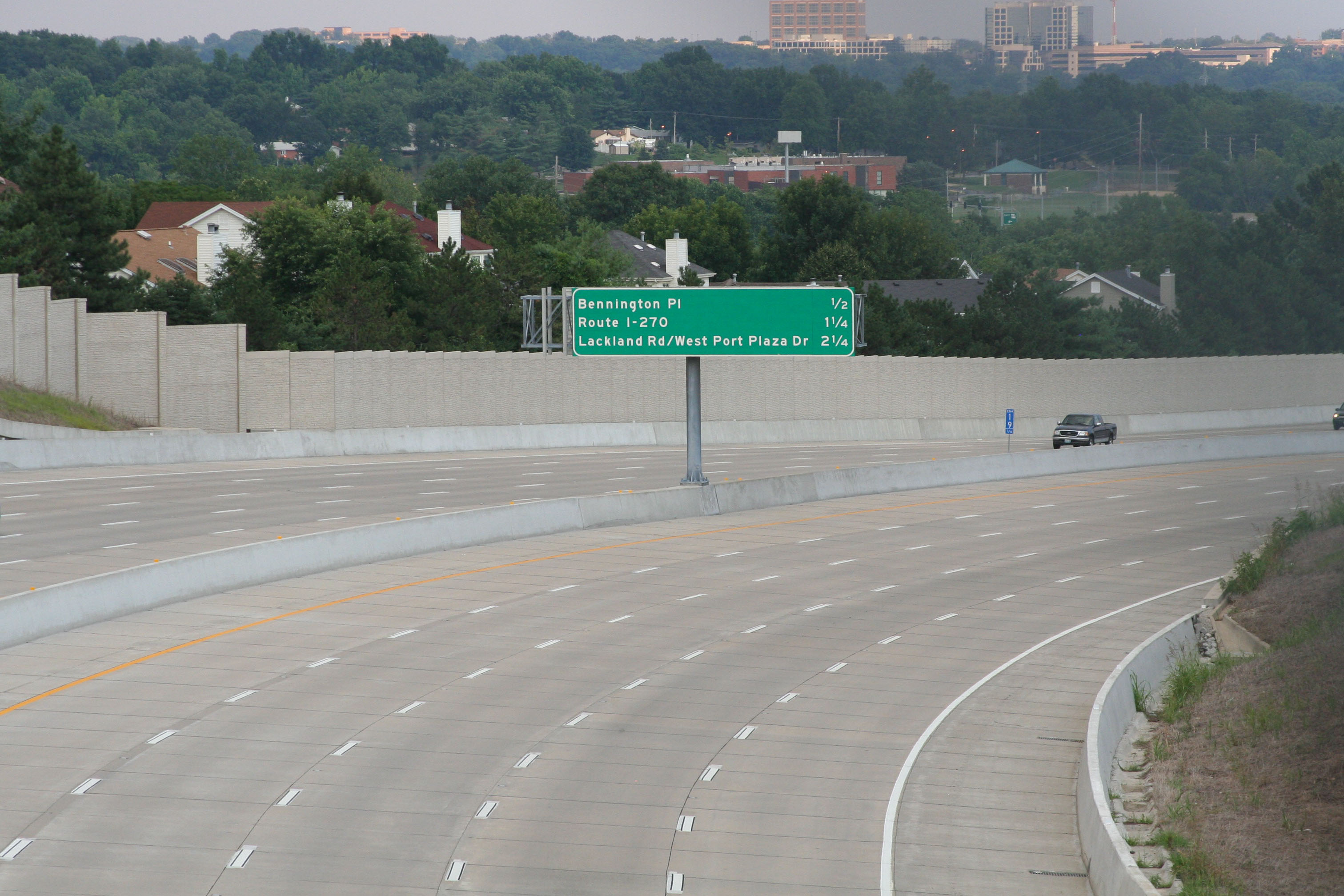
Route 364 looking east from Amiot Drive.

The East-West Gateway Council of Governments determined there was a need for the freeway in 1969. However, little progress was made until the commissioning of the Page Avenue Bridge Committee in the fall of 1984. An earlier alignment, called the Green Line, bypassed Creve Coeur Lake Memorial Park and took the freeway to I-70, but it could no longer be considered due to the rapid growth of the city of St. Peters and because the park expanded in size and encroached on the proposed alignment anyway. The committee proposed a new alignment called the Red Line and the Missouri Department of Transportation (MoDOT) authorized the project in the fall of 1986. The next spring, Missouri voters approved a fuel tax increase which included funding for the project. MoDOT held numerous meetings since then, but the alignment was not approved until June 1990. The United States Congress passed legislation in October 1992 authorizing the project as part of the Pipeline Safety Act of 1992. The environmental impact study was completed in November 1992, but, just before the project was to receive final clearance from the federal government, Secretary of the Interior Bruce Babbitt took office and ordered more environmental studies resulting in more land mitigation for intrusion into Creve Coeur Lake Memorial Park. In the fall of 1995, the federal government gave the final clearance for the project 11 years after active planning began. For nearly 27 years, the roadway was simply referred to as the Page Avenue Extension, but in February 1996 MoDOT gave the freeway an official designation of MO-364. Construction on the freeway is divided into 3 separate phases and began with the first project in 1997.

=== Phase I ===
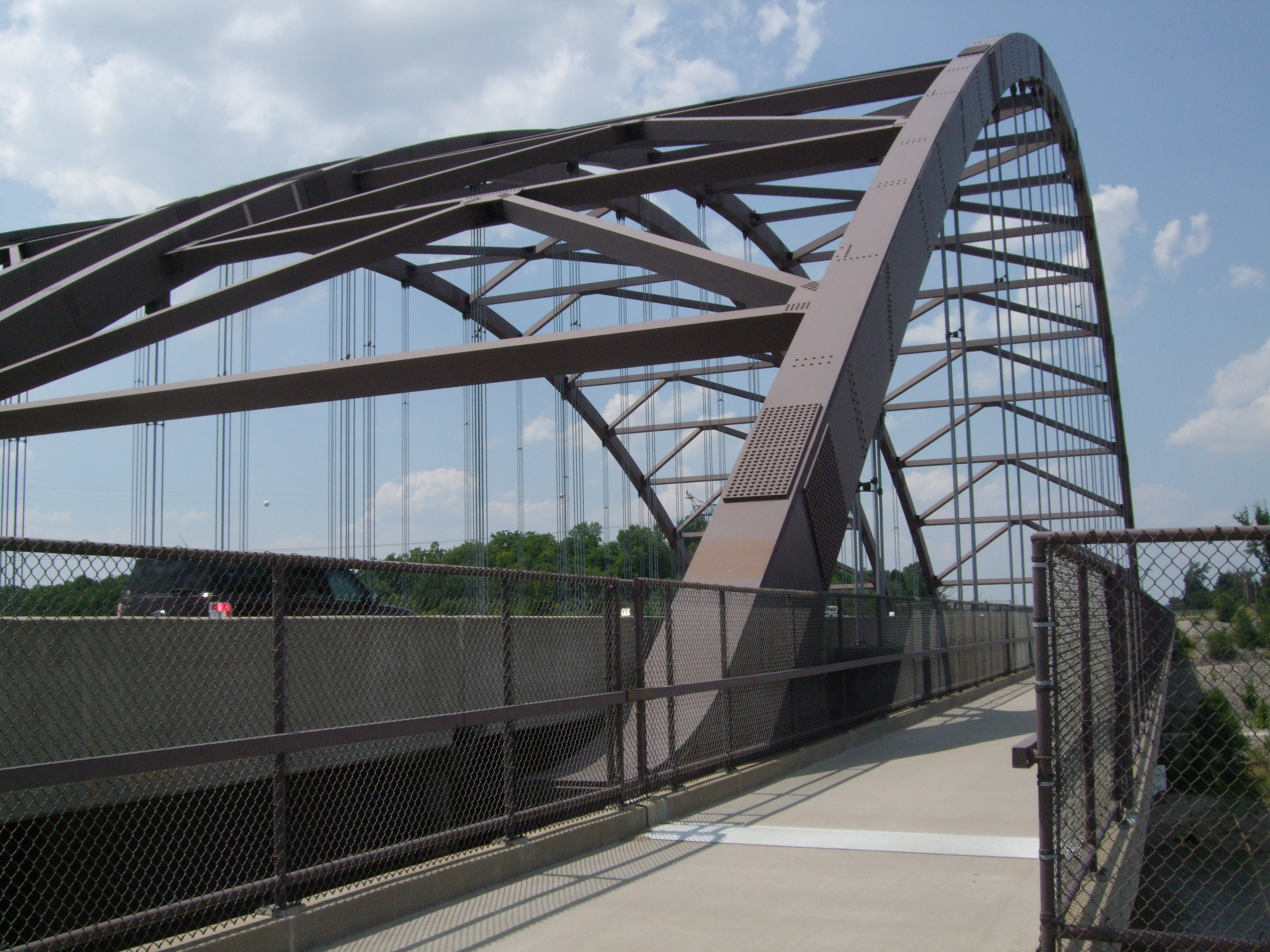
Route 364 spans the Missouri River with a steel through arch, suspended concrete deck bridge. Also visible in the above image is the parallel pedestrian/bike path.

Phase I included work from I-270 to Route 94 through the Creve Coeur Lake Memorial Park, but due to concerns with traffic congestion at the proposed terminus with MO-94 it was decided to extend the freeway further west along its concurrency with MO-94 to Harvester Rd. Two major bridge structures were required, which included the Veterans Memorial Bridge and Creve Coeur Lake Memorial Park Bridge which cost $79 million and $74 million respectively. Both structures are designed to withstand seismic activity from the nearby New Madrid Fault. The total cost to construct this phase was approximately $350 million.

This phase also included improvements to the Creve Coeur Lake Memorial Park. The park nearly doubled in size and an existing bike trail there was linked to the Katy Trail in St. Charles County via the Veterans Memorial Bridge. The Creve Coeur Lake was dredged and a siltation lake was added to eliminate the need for future dredging.

A ribbon cutting ceremony occurred on December 13, 2003. The ceremony was held on the eastbound lanes of the Veterans Memorial Bridge. Dignitaries that spoke included then Governor Bob Holden and Senator Christopher "Kit" Bond. Following the various speeches and ribbon cutting, a ceremonial first drive occurred between Upper Bottom Rd/Arena Parkway and Maryland Heights Expressway. Due to inclement weather, MoDOT opted to use December 13, 2003 to clear snow off the freeway and delayed opening the freeway until around 10:00 am on December 14, 2003 after the roadway was cleared.

The section of the freeway in St. Louis County has been dedicated the Buzz Westfall Memorial Freeway after former St. Louis County Executive Buzz Westfall who helped get the freeway built. Westfall died in 2003, months before the freeway opened.

A new interchange taking NB I-270 to WB MO-364 opened to traffic on July 22, 2011. This two lane ramp replaced a cumbersome cloverleaf movement which caused frequent backups on I-270.

=== Phase II ===
Phase II work extended the freeway along its concurrency with Route 94 to Route N/Mid Rivers Mall Dr including a one way outer road system. Work along MO-94 from Portwest Dr to Harvester Rd was completed as part of the Phase I. This phase of construction was completed on August 30, 2012.

Completion of Phase II had originally been proposed to happen in segments with each interchange constituting a separate project. Work began on the Harvester Road interchange with grading and utility relocation in the fall of 2006. In 2008, the Jungermann Road and Woodstone Drive interchanges had been approved, funded, and scheduled for construction in 2010. However, the American Recovery and Reinvestment Act of 2009 accelerated that project and included funding for the segment to construct the Central School Road interchange. The final Phase II projects including grade separated interchanges at Kisker Rd and Mid Rivers Mall Drive were approved and funded shortly thereafter.

The Harvester Road interchange opened to traffic on July 27, 2010. Phase II to Mid Rivers Mall Drive opened on August 30, 2012.

=== Phase III ===
MoDOT, St. Charles County and local municipalities teamed together to allocate $118.2 million towards building Route 364/Page Phase 3. The $118.2 million was used for purchasing property, utility relocations, design and construction. The project included building an improved connection from Page Phase 2 at Route 94 and Mid Rivers Mall Drive to I-64/US Route 40/61 at Route N. MoDOT used a Design-Build contracting process to have contractor teams compete to win the contract. The Missouri Highways and Transportation Commission approved the contract on February 6, 2013, awarding the project to the Page Constructors Joint Venture, which includes Fred Weber Inc. and Millstone-Bangert Inc (now known as Millstone Weber) along with Kolb Grading and lead designer, Parsons Transportation Group.

Phase III extended the freeway from Mid Rivers Mall Drive/Pitman Hill Road to I-64/US-40/US-61 paralleling, but not overtaking, the existing Route N. The interchange at I-64 and Route N, which opened in October 2005, became the western terminus of the freeway upon its completion. Final approval and funding was granted in August 2011. Construction was underway from the spring of 2013 until the fall of 2014. Phase III was opened up in stages from Route 94 to I-64. A segment of the highway from I-64 to Route K was opened on October 4, 2014, and the segment from Route K to Route 94/Mid Rivers Mall Drive opened on the evening of November 2, 2014.

=== Controversy ===
Controversy over the construction of the freeway came from several sources. The freeway's alignment would take it through the Creve Coeur Lake Memorial Park and the floodplain of the Missouri River drawing opposition from environmental groups including the Sierra Club and the Missouri Coalition for the Environment. Its high cost and debate over urban sprawl forced many St. Louis County municipalities to pass resolutions opposing the freeway. A petition to put the freeway up for referendum was submitted in 1998, and enough signatures were collected to force a vote. On November 3, 1998, voters approved right-of-way for the freeway by a 61% margin, and construction continued. In exchange, St. Louis County accepted 1,005 acres (4.07 km^{2}) of land adjacent to the park.

=== Current developments ===
On February 17, 2020, work began on a new interchange with Gutermuth Road, roughly 2 miles west of the western end of Route 364's concurrency with Route 94. Situated between the Route 94/Mid Rivers Mall Drive and Route K exits, a gap that spanned nearly four miles, the new exit would provide direct connections to residential Cottleville, alleviating significant traffic burdens on roadways between those two exits. The interchange, given the exit number 6, opened on the evening of November 19, 2020.

In early March 2021, construction began on slip ramps connecting Heritage Crossing. The ramps will connect to westbound 364/94 and from eastbound 364/94 via North and South St. Peters Parkways, respectively. The new slipramps opened on August 10, 2021.

In October 2021, MoDOT awarded a contract to update the interchange between Route 364, Route 94 and Muegge Road in St. Peters, and construction began in November. The current interchange does not offer direct connection from Muegge Road to westbound Route 364/94 or to eastbound Route 94. The updated interchange aims to fix this by constructing a diverging diamond interchange at Muegge Road. The new interchange was opened on June 22, 2023.

== Exit list ==
County	Location	mi	km	Exit	Destinations	Notes
St. Charles	Lake St. Louis	0.000	0.000	–	Route N west (Hawk Ridge Trail)	Continuation beyond I-64 / US 40 / US 61, I-64 exit 4A.
St. Charles	Lake St. Louis	0.330	0.531	1	I-64 / US 40 / US 61 – Wentzville, Chesterfield	Western terminus; I-64 exit 4B; signed as exits 1A (west) & 1B (east).
St. Charles	Lake St. Louis	0.701	1.128	1C	Henke Road	Westbound exit and eastbound entrance
St. Charles	O'Fallon	2.227	3.584	2	Bryan Road	
St. Charles	O'Fallon	4.717	7.591	4	Route K	
St. Charles	Cottleville	7.027	11.309	6	Gutermuth Road	
St. Charles	St. Peters	8.931	14.373	8B	Route 94 west / Mid Rivers Mall Drive / Pitman Hill Road – Weldon Spring	Western end of Route 94 concurrency
St. Charles	St. Peters	9.787– 10.322	15.751– 16.612	9	Kisker Road / Central School Road / Harvestowne Industrial Drive	Signed as Exit 9A eastbound
St. Charles	St. Peters	11.333	18.239	10	Jungermann Road	Eastbound exit and westbound entrance
St. Charles	St. Peters	11.737– 12.076	18.889– 19.434	11	Woodstone Drive / Harvester Road / Jungs Station Road	Signed westbound as exits 11A (Woodstone) and Exit 11B (Harvester)
St. Charles	St. Peters	13.213	21.264	12	Heritage Crossing	
St. Charles	St. Charles	13.428	21.610	13	Route 94 east / Muegge Road – St. Charles	Eastern end of Route 94 concurrency
St. Charles		14.977	24.103	14	Arena Parkway / Upper Bottom Road	
Missouri River		15.643	25.175	Veterans Memorial Bridge		
St. Louis	Maryland Heights	17.932	28.859	17	Route 141 (Maryland Heights Expressway)	
St. Louis	Maryland Heights	20.329	32.716	19	Bennington Place	
St. Louis	Maryland Heights	21.111	33.975	20	I-270 – Tulsa, Memphis, Chicago, Kansas City	Eastern terminus; I-270 exit 16 northbound, 16B southbound; signed as exits 20A (south) & 20B (north).
St. Louis	Maryland Heights	21.384	34.414	–	Route D east (Page Avenue)	Continuation beyond I-270, exit 16 northbound, 16A southbound.
1.000 mi = 1.609 km; 1.000 km = 0.621 mi: Concurrency terminus; Incomplete access; Unopened
