= Creve Coeur Lake Memorial Park Bridge =

- Coordinates: 38.706°N 90.487°W
- Carries: 10 lanes of Route 364
- Crosses: Creve Coeur Lake Memorial Park
- Locale: Maryland Heights, Missouri
- Maintained by: Missouri Department of Transportation

Characteristics
- Total length: 815.3 m (2,675 ft)
- Width: 52.4 m (172 ft)
- Longest span: 143.3 m (470 ft)
- Clearance below: 33.5 m (110 ft)

History
- Opened: December 13, 2003

Location
- Interactive map of Creve Coeur Lake Memorial Park Bridge

The Creve Coeur Lake Memorial Park Bridge carries Route 364 across the Creve Coeur Lake Memorial Park in Maryland Heights, Missouri.
