= Creve Coeur Lake Memorial Park =

Park in Missouri, United States

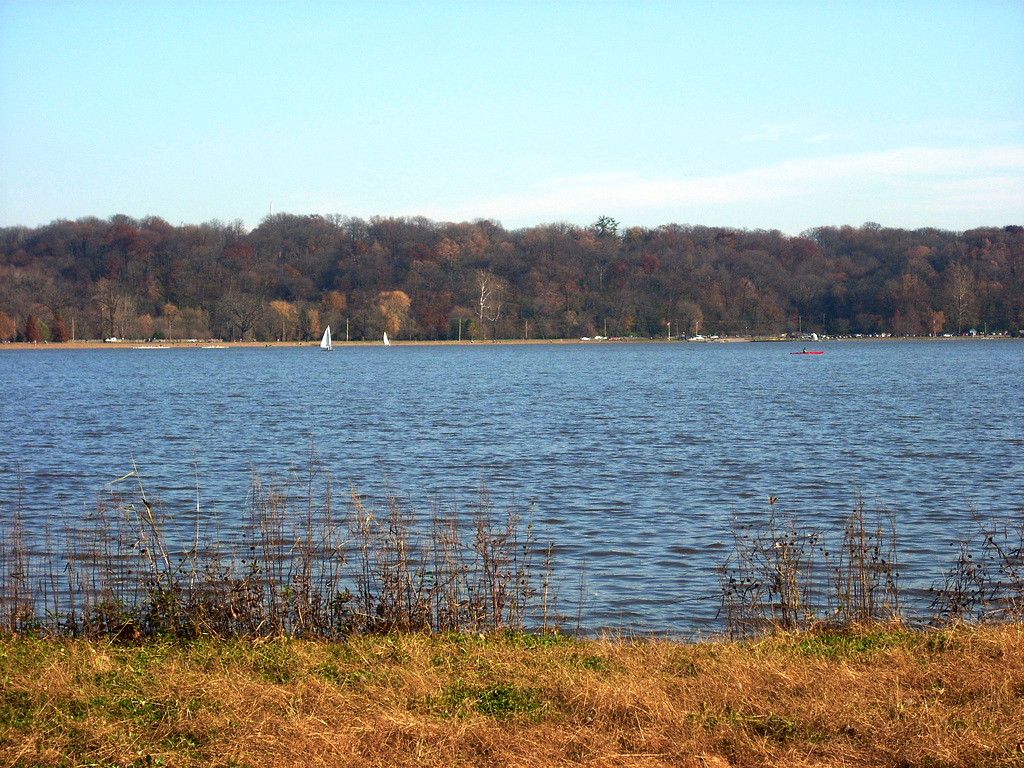
- A view of Creve Coeur Lake, part of the park.
- Interactive map of Creve Coeur Lake Memorial Park
- Type: County Park
- Location: 2143 Creve Coeur Mill Rd., 63146, Maryland Heights, St. Louis County, Missouri, United States
- Coordinates: 38.714°N 90.486°W
- Area: 2,145 acres (8.68 km^{2})
- Created: 1945
- Operator: St. Louis County Government
- Website: Creve Coeur Lake Memorial Park

Creve Coeur Lake Memorial Park (also called Creve Coeur County Park) is a 2,145-acre (8.68 km^{2}) St. Louis County park located in Maryland Heights, Missouri, United States. The park is the largest in the St. Louis County Parks system and includes Creve Coeur Lake, an oxbow lake that is one of the largest natural lakes in Missouri.

== Naming ==
The name of the park, drawn from the French "creve coeur," is said to have originated from the shape of the lake. Folklore has it that it formed into the shape of a broken heart after an incident of unrequited love between a French fur trader and a local Native American woman. Brokenhearted, she cast herself into the lake, thus causing its reshaping, according to the tale.

== Description ==
The park has facilities for picnicking, tennis courts, multi-purpose athletic fields, and an archery course. Creve Coeur Park includes Crystal Springs Quarry Golf Course, an 18-hole course opened in 2001.

In December 2003, construction for the Creve Coeur Lake Memorial Park Bridge, which is part of Missouri Route 364, was completed. The concrete bridge connects St. Louis County to St. Charles County and crosses over the southern end of the park. The project also included Creve Coeur Lake being dredged and the addition of a siltation lake to prevent the need for later dredging. Creve Coeur Lake Memorial Park has an asphalt walking trail around the lake, which was constructed by the Missouri Department of Transportation alongside the bridge project. The trail also connects to a separate lane on the bridge leading across the Missouri River to connect to the Katy Trail.

A large portion of the park and surrounding area is also wetlands, and the park has been used for conservation purposes, particularly the study of various waterfowl.

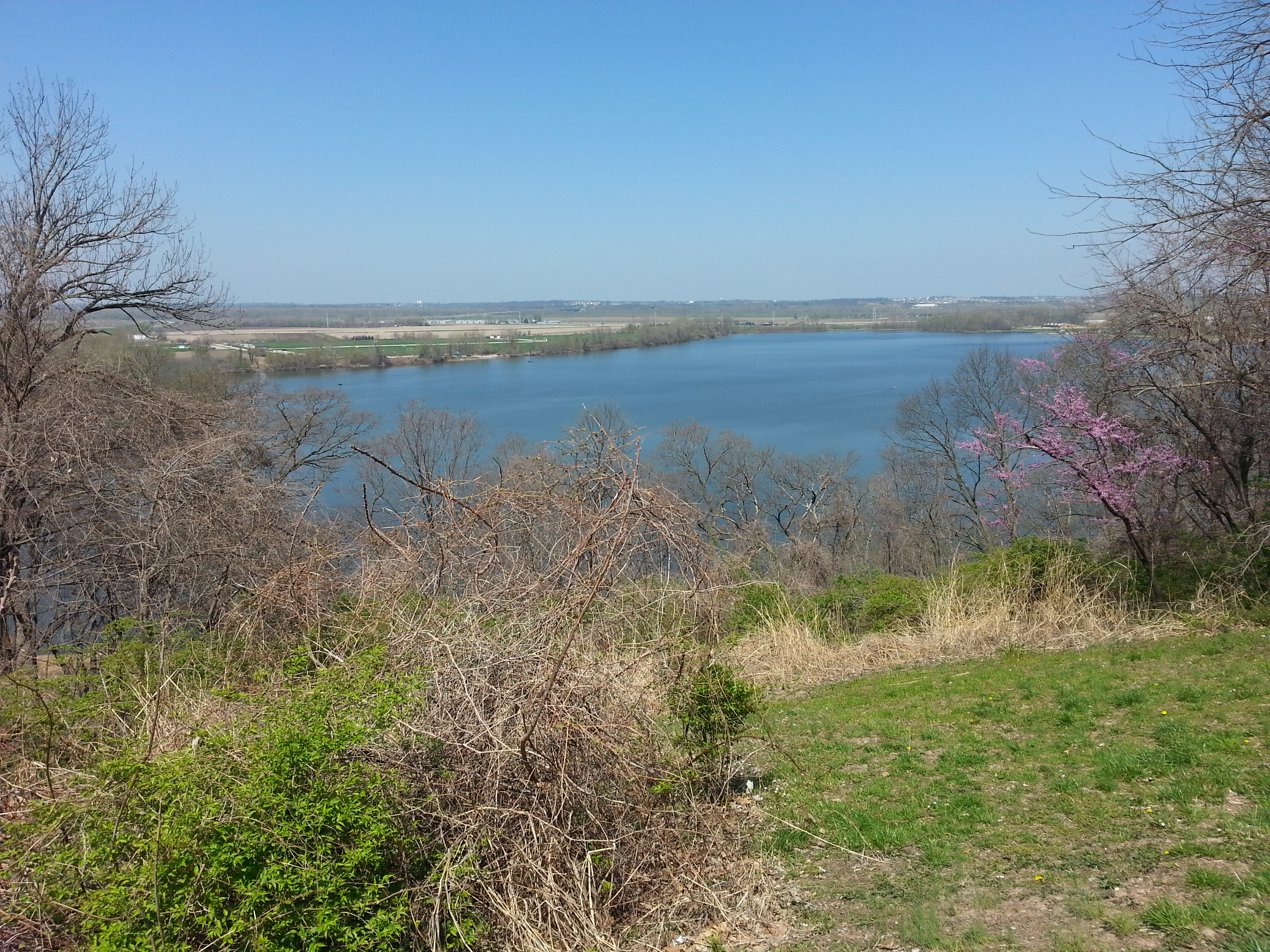
A view of Creve Coeur Lake from atop the bluffs at the Albert P. Greensfelder memorial pavilion

== History ==
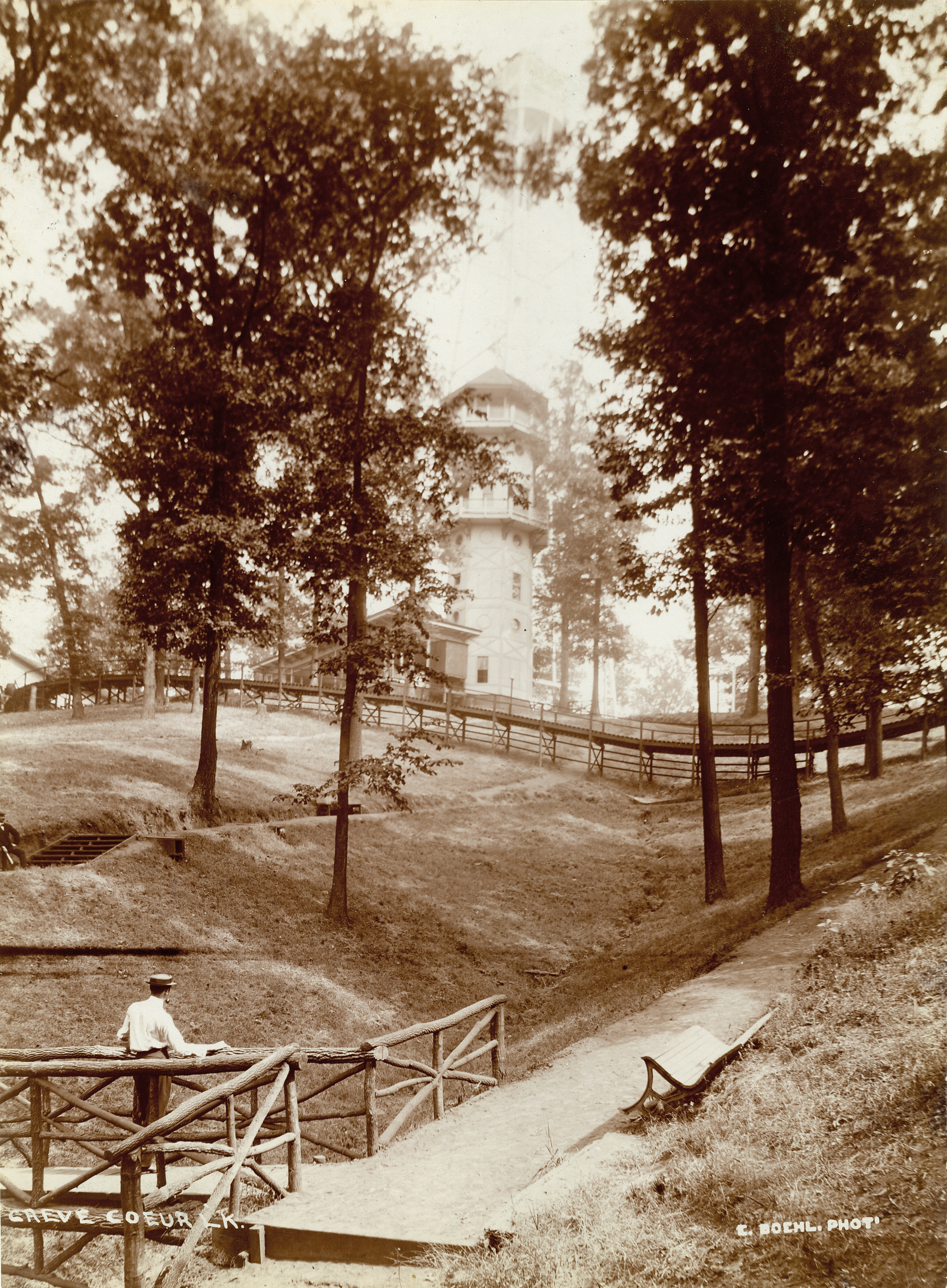
"Creve Coeur Lake." (View looking across park toward the observation tower). Photograph by Emil Boehl, c. 1910. Missouri Historical Society.

The park was the first in the St. Louis County Park system and was dedicated in 1945. Originally a resort, Creve Coeur Lake, which is 320 acres (1.3 km^{2}), had hosted many boating events decades before the park officially opened. In June 1882, the Mississippi Valley regatta was held at the lake. It also hosted the Creve Coeur Regatta and the Annual Races of the National Association of Amateur Oarsmen in 1904 (the rowing competition for the 1904 Summer Olympics), and it was the site where local sculler Jacob Gaudaur often competed, including his victory over John Teemer in a sculling match in 1884. Gaudaur was married to a resident of Creve Coeur, Cora Coons. A smaller, 66-acre (0.27 km^{2}) lake, called Mallard Lake, was constructed with the bridge project.

Creve Coeur Park also comes with a reputation. During prohibition there were speakeasies, roadhouses, floating bars, restaurants, hotels, shooting ranges and stables. Gangsters and hoodlums also frequented the saloons, restaurants, and nightclubs located at the lakefront adding to the unsavory reputation it had at the time.
