= Veterans Memorial Bridge (Missouri) =

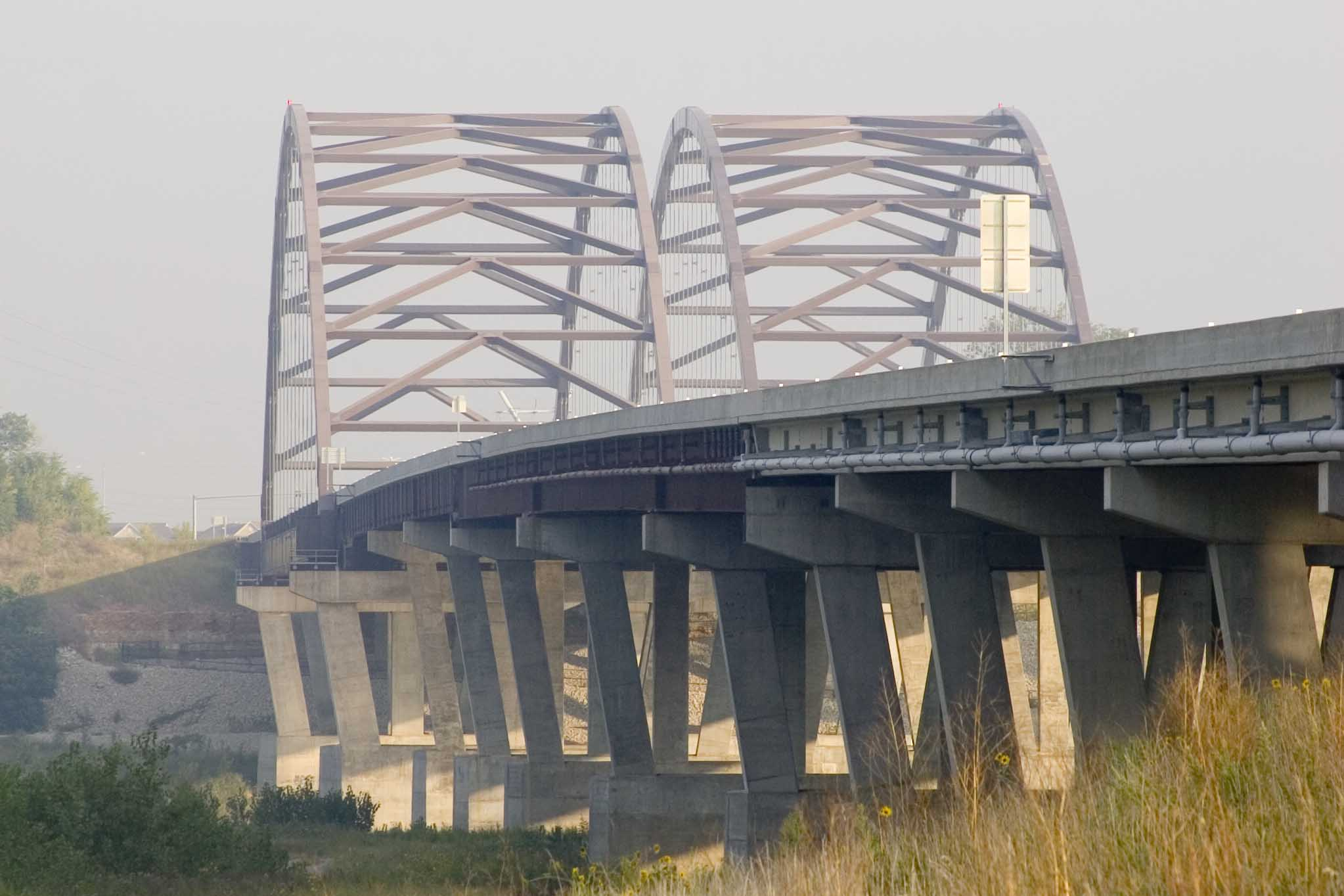
- Coordinates: 38.737°N 90.5223°W
- Carries: 10 lanes of Route 364
- Crosses: Missouri River
- Locale: St. Louis County and St. Charles County in Missouri
- Maintained by: Missouri Department of Transportation

Characteristics
- Design: Twin tied-arch bridges
- Total length: 3,244 ft (988.8 m)
- Width: 2 × 90 ft (2 × 27.7 m), 180 ft (54.8 m) total
- Longest span: 616 ft (187.8 m)

History
- Opened: December 13, 2003

Statistics
- Daily traffic: 46,706 (2008)

Location
- Interactive map of Veterans Memorial Bridge

The Veterans Memorial Bridge are two twin tied arch structures carrying Route 364 across the Missouri River between St. Louis County and St. Charles County, Missouri. Each bridge supports five lanes of traffic, the northern (downstream) bridge westbound, and the southern (upstream) bridge eastbound.

On the north (downstream) side of the bridge runs a bike path that connects Creve Coeur Memorial Park to the Katy Trail.

== See also ==
- List of crossings of the Missouri River
