= U.S. Route 67 =

Highway in the United States

U.S. Route 67
- US 67 highlighted in red

Route information
- Length: 1,560 mi (2,510 km)
- Existed: 1926–present

Major junctions
- South end: Fed. 16 at the Mexican Border in Presidio, TX
- I-10 / US 285 / US 385 near Fort Stockton, TX; I-35W at Alvarado, TX; I-20 / I-35E / US 77 in Dallas, TX; I-30 at various locations; I-40 in North Little Rock, AR; US 60 northwest of Poplar Bluff, MO; I-55 / US 61 at Festus, MO; I-44 in Kirkwood, MO; I-70 in St. Ann, MO; I-80 near LeClaire, IA
- North end: US 52 / Iowa 64 at Sabula, IA

Location
- Country: United States
- States: Texas, Arkansas, Missouri, Illinois, Iowa

Highway system
- United States Numbered Highway System; List; Special; Divided
| ← US 66 | → US 68 |

U.S. Route 67 is a major north–south U.S. highway which extends for 1,560 miles (2,511 km) in the Central United States. The southern terminus of the route is at the United States-Mexico border in Presidio, Texas, where it continues south as Mexican Federal Highway 16 upon crossing the Rio Grande. The northern terminus is at U.S. Route 52 in Sabula, Iowa. US 67 crosses the Mississippi River twice along its routing. The first crossing is at West Alton, Missouri, where US 67 uses the Clark Bridge to reach Alton, Illinois. About 240 miles (390 km) to the north, US 67 crosses the river again at the Rock Island Centennial Bridge between Rock Island, Illinois, and Davenport, Iowa. Additionally, the route crosses the Missouri River via the Lewis Bridge a few miles southwest of the Clark Bridge.

== Route description ==
Lengths
| | mi | km |
|---|---|---|
| TX | 766 | 1233 |
| AR | 325 | 523 |
| MO | 201 | 323 |
| IL | 212 | 341 |
| IA | 56 | 90 |
| Total | 1560 | 2511 |

=== Texas ===
Throughout Texas, US 67 runs in a primarily northeast–southwest manner, apparently violating the norms for numbering U.S. highways as odd-numbered routes are typically north–south in orientation, because prevailing north–south versus prevailing east–west designation is determined by the ultimate termini as the route traverses multiple states.

US 67 is part of the La Entrada al Pacifico international trade corridor from its southern terminus to an intersection with U.S. Route 385 in McCamey, where the corridor follows US 385 to Odessa.

Between Dallas and Weaver in eastern Hopkins County, the highway runs concurrently with Interstate 30, and is unsigned between Dallas and Royse City. From Weaver east to the Arkansas state line in Texarkana, US 67 runs parallel to I-30. East of the Interstate 35E/Interstate 30 "mixmaster" in Downtown Dallas, U.S. Route 67 follows Interstate 30. West of the "mixmaster," U.S. 67 follows I-35E south through Oak Cliff. Along this portion, the Route 67 shield is also alongside the Interstate shield. Just north of Kiest Boulevard, U.S. Route 67 breaks off from Interstate 35E and maintains controlled-access ("Interstate grade") status down to Midlothian, where it becomes a four-lane divided highway to the western edge of Cleburne. The route from Alpine to San Angelo was a previous route of SH 99.

Though it passes through the heart of the Ozarks, the highest elevation along US 67 is the last 150 miles between Fort Stockton and Presidio. Below Fort Stockton, US 67 passes the Sierra Del Norte range at 6810 ft. West of Alpine, US 67 passes near the Twin Sisters (6116 and 6134 ft), Ranger Peak (6256 ft), and Paisano Peak (6091 ft) before going through Paisano Pass (5,180 ft). East of Marfa are views of Twin Mountains (6681 and 6910 ft), Goat Mountain (6642 ft), Cathedral Peak (6867 ft), and Cienega Mountain (6565 ft). The Puertacitas Mountains (6350 ft) and the Davis Mountains (8371 ft) can be seen from the Marfa lights observatory to the north. The Davis Mountains are the highest elevation near US 67. Thirty miles south of Marfa, US 67 reaches its highest point at 5428 ft, with Chinatti Peak (7732 ft) seen to the southwest.

=== Arkansas ===
In Arkansas, US 67 runs parallel with Interstate 30 from Texarkana to Benton, where it then runs concurrently with I-30 to North Little Rock. It then runs concurrent with Interstate 57 north to US 412 in Walnut Ridge, where I-57 and the freeway ends and the road becomes a five-lane undivided highway to Pocahontas. After Pocahontas, the road returns to a two-lane alignment north to the state line.

In 2009, a bill was introduced to rename the portion of US 67. The bill, by Rep. J.R. Rogers of Walnut Ridge, designates US 67 in Jackson, Lawrence, and Randolph Counties as "Rock 'n' Roll Highway 67." Besides Elvis Presley and Johnny Cash, the bill notes that Roy Orbison, Jerry Lee Lewis, and Fats Domino played at clubs along that stretch of highway.

=== Missouri ===
Going from south to north, US 67 enters Missouri at the Arkansas state line. About 10 miles (16 km) north of the state line, it intersects US 160. At the southwest corner of Poplar Bluff, Business Route 67 goes into Poplar Bluff while US 67 bypasses Poplar Bluff to the west on a freeway-grade highway. It then joins US 60 at the northwest corner of Poplar Bluff. Both 60 and 67 then follow a four-lane route to an interchange about 6 miles (9.7 km) northwest of Poplar Bluff, where US 60 heads west toward Springfield, while US 67 heads north to St. Louis.

Construction is complete to divide the highway through Wayne, Madison, and Butler Counties, including bypasses around Greenville and Cherokee Pass. The new divided highway opened on August 19, 2011, with a ribbon-cutting ceremony. Additionally, MoDOT has extended the divided highway south to US 160 south of Poplar Bluff.

From Fredericktown, US 67 passes through Farmington, where an existing interchange with Route 221 was converted to a diverging diamond interchange in September 2012. US 67 then proceeds through Park Hills, Desloge, and Bonne Terre. About 25 miles (40 km) north of Bonne Terre, US 67 crosses Interstate 55 and enters Festus and Crystal City and picks up US 61. This becomes known as Truman Boulevard in Festus and Crystal City, Highway 61-67 from Herculaneum to Imperial, and Jeffco Boulevard from Arnold until it exits Jefferson County and enters St. Louis County, over the Meramec River where it becomes Lemay Ferry Road.

When US 67/61 reaches St. Louis County, It travels Lemay Ferry Road (Route 267) until it reaches Lindbergh Boulevard. There, it overlaps Lindbergh Boulevard (known as Kirkwood Road in Kirkwood). US 61 then turns west onto I-64/US 40 West towards Wentzville. Lindbergh, named for aviator Charles Lindbergh, continues north through Frontenac, Ladue, Creve Coeur, Maryland Heights, Bridgeton, Hazelwood and Florissant until it reaches Lewis & Clark Boulevard (Route 367). From there, it continues straight north to West Alton, Missouri and then crosses the Mississippi River on the Clark Bridge and enters Alton, Illinois.

The only vehicular tunnel in Missouri is located on US 67 at St. Louis Lambert International Airport, where the road tunnels under Runway 11/29.

=== Illinois ===
In the state of Illinois, US 67 runs north from the Clark Bridge in Alton, passing through Jerseyville, then through the Forgottonia region of western Illinois. It runs near the cities of Jacksonville, Beardstown, through Macomb, and near Monmouth before crossing into Iowa across the Rock Island Centennial Bridge.

=== Iowa ===
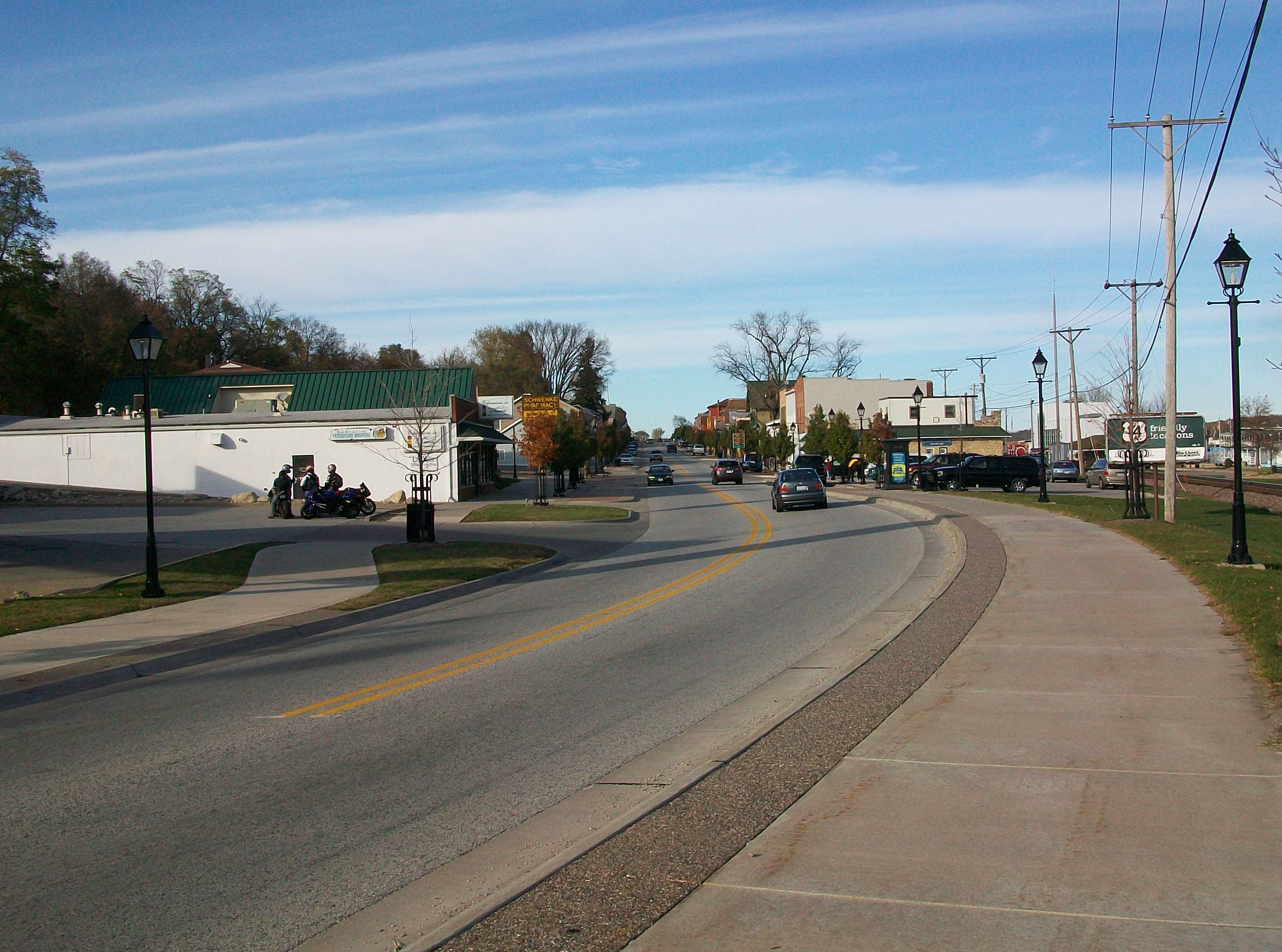
U.S. 67 in LeClaire, Iowa

US 67 enters Iowa in Davenport. It follows an alignment through Bettendorf and Clinton which parallels the Mississippi River. Near Sabula, US 67 meets U.S. Route 52 and Iowa Highway 64 and ends.

== Major intersections ==
Texas
Fed. 16 at the Presidio–Ojinaga International Bridge at Presidio
US 90 in Marfa. The highways travel concurrently to east-northeast of Alpine.
I-10 west of Fort Stockton. The highways travel concurrently to east-southeast of Fort Stockton.
US 285 in Fort Stockton
US 385 in Fort Stockton. The highways travel concurrently to McCamey.
US 87 / US 277 in San Angelo. US 67/US 277 travels concurrently to northeast of San Angelo.
US 83 in Ballinger. The highways travel concurrently to northeast of Ballinger.
US 84 / US 283 in Santa Anna. US 67/US 84 travels concurrently to Early. US 67/US 283 travels concurrently through Santa Anna.
US 377 in Brownwood. The highways travel concurrently to Stephenville.
US 183 in Early
US 281 in Stephenville
I-35W in Alvarado
US 287 in Midlothian
I-20 in Dallas
I-35E in Dallas. The highways travel concurrently through Dallas.
I-30 / I-35E in Dallas. I-30/US 67 travels concurrently to west-southwest of Saltillo.
I-45 / I-345 / in Dallas ( US-75 Ends a couple of miles north of this intersection at the north end of the unsigned IH-345.)
US 80 on the Dallas–Mesquite city line
I-635 in Mesquite
US 69 / US 380 in Greenville
US 271 in Mount Pleasant
US 259 North of Omaha
I-369 / US 59 in Texarkana
US 82 in Texarkana. The highways travel concurrently to Texarkana, Arkansas.
US 71 on the Arkansas state line. The highways travel concurrently to Texarkana, Arkansas.
Arkansas
I-30 northeast of Mandeville
US 278 in Hope
US 371 in Prescott. The highways travel concurrently through Prescott.
US 270 east of Perla
I-30 northwest of Traskwood
I-30 / US 70 southwest of Benton. The highways travel concurrently to North Little Rock.
I-430 in Little Rock
I-530 / US 65 / US 167 in Little Rock. US 65/US 67 travels concurrently to North Little Rock. US 67/US 167 travels concurrently to Bald Knob.
I-630 in Little Rock
I-30 / I-40 / I-57 / US 65 in North Little Rock. I-40/US 67 travels concurrently through North Little Rock. I-57/US 67 will travel concurrently to northwest of Poplar Bluff, Missouri.
US 64 in Beebe. The highways travel concurrently to Bald Knob.
US 78 west of Cash
US 63 in Hoxie. The highways travel concurrently to Walnut Ridge.
US 412 in Walnut Ridge
US 62 in Pocahontas. The highways travel concurrently to Corning.
Missouri
US 160 east of Fairdealing
Future I-57 / US 60 northwest of Poplar Bluff. The highways travel concurrently to south-southwest of Hendrickson.
I-55 in Festus
US 61 in Festus. The highways travel concurrently to the Frontenac–Ladue city line.
I-255 in Mehlville
US 50 in Mehlville. The highways travel concurrently to the Sunsest Hills–Kirkwood city line.
I-55 on the Concord–Mehlville–Green Park city line
I-44 / US 50 on the Sunset Hills–Kirkwood city line
I-64 / US 40 / US 61 on the Frontenac–Ladue city line
I-70 in Bridgeton
I-270 in Hazelwood
Illinois
I-72 / US 36 southwest of South Jacksonville
US 24 in Rushville
US 136 east of Macomb. The highways travel concurrently to Macomb.
US 34 south-southwest of Monmouth. The highways travel concurrently to Monmouth.
Iowa
I-74 / US 6 in Bettendorf
I-80 in Le Claire
US 30 in Clinton. The highways travel concurrently through Clinton.
US 52 west of Sabula

== Auxiliary route ==
U.S. Route 167 is the only auxiliary route of US 67. US 167 stretches from Abbeville, LA to Ash Flat, AR and intersects US 67 at Bald Knob, AR.

== Special routes ==
US 67 has numerous business routes in Texas, Arkansas, Missouri, and Illinois.

== See also ==
Browse numbered routes
| ← FM 66 | TX | → SH 67 |
| ← Route 66 | MO | → Route 68 |
| ← US 66 | IL | → IL 68 |
| ← US 65 | IA | → US 69 |
