= U.S. Route 67 in Missouri =

Segment of American highway

U.S. Route 67
- US 67 highlighted in red

Route information
- Maintained by MoDOT
- Length: 197.741 mi (318.233 km)

Major junctions
- South end: US 67 at the Arkansas state line near Neelyville
- Future I-57 / US 60 / US 60 Bus. / US 67 Bus. in Poplar Bluff; I-55 in Crystal City; US 61 from Crystal City to Frontenac; I-255 in Mehlville; US 50 in Mehlville; I-270 in Mehlville; I-44 in Sunset Hills; I-64 / US 40 in Frontenac; I-70 in St. Ann; I-270 in Hazelwood
- North end: US 67 at the Illinois state line in Alton, IL

Location
- Country: United States
- State: Missouri
- Counties: Butler, Wayne, Madison, St. Francois, Jefferson, St. Louis, St. Charles

Highway system
- United States Numbered Highway System; List; Special; Divided; Missouri State Highway System; Interstate; US; State; Supplemental
← Route 66	→ Route 68

U.S. Route 67 (US 67) is the portion of a north-south highway in Missouri that starts at the Arkansas state line south of Neelyville and ends at the Illinois state line northeast of West Alton.

== Route description ==
Going from south to north, US 67 enters Missouri at the Arkansas state line. About 10 miles (16 km) north of the state line, it intersects US 160. At the southwest corner of Poplar Bluff, Business Route 67 goes into Poplar Bluff while US 67 bypasses Poplar Bluff to the west on a freeway-grade highway. It then joins US 60 at the northwest corner of Poplar Bluff. Both 60 and 67 then follow a four-lane route to an interchange about 6 miles (9.7 km) northwest of Poplar Bluff, where US 60 heads west toward Springfield while US 67 heads north to St. Louis.

Construction is complete to divide the highway through Wayne, Madison and Butler Counties, including bypasses around Greenville and Cherokee Pass. The new divided highway opened on August 19, 2011, with a ribbon-cutting ceremony. Additionally, MoDOT has extended the divided highway south to US 160 south of Poplar Bluff.

From Fredericktown, US 67 passes through Farmington, where an existing interchange with Route 221 was converted to a diverging diamond interchange in September 2012. US 67 then proceeds through Park Hills, Desloge, and Bonne Terre. About 25 miles (40 km) north of Bonne Terre, US 67 crosses Interstate 55 and enters Festus and Crystal City and picks up US 61. This becomes known as Truman Boulevard in Festus and Crystal City, Highway 61-67 from Herculaneum to Imperial, and Jeffco Boulevard from Arnold until it exits Jefferson County and enters St. Louis County, where it becomes Lemay Ferry Road.

=== St. Louis County ===
When US 67/61 reaches St. Louis County, it travels Lemay Ferry Road (Route 267) until it reaches Lindbergh Boulevard. There it travels Lindbergh Boulevard (known as Kirkwood Road in Kirkwood). US 61 then turns west onto I-64/US 40 West towards Wentzville. Lindbergh, named for aviator Charles Lindbergh, continues north through Frontenac, Ladue, Creve Coeur, Maryland Heights, Bridgeton, Hazelwood and Florissant until it reaches Lewis & Clark Boulevard (Route 367). From there, it continues straight north to West Alton, Missouri and then crosses the Mississippi River on the Clark Bridge and enters Alton, Illinois.

The only vehicular tunnel in Missouri is located on US 67 at Lambert-St. Louis International Airport, where the road tunnels under the runway.

== History ==
The northern terminus was at Alt. US 61 near Fredericktown, Missouri, in 1926. The route was extended north on Illinois Route 3 (through western Illinois) to its northern terminus in Rock Island, Illinois by 1932. Sometime after 1940, US 67 was routed into Madison County. Then, it was co-signed with Route 66 as both routes went across the McKinley Bridge.

By the mid-1940s, US 67 had been rerouted from St. Louis to Alton via the Lewis Bridge over the Missouri River and the Clark Bridge (formerly the Old Clark Bridge) over the Mississippi River. The Alton to Jerseyville section now passed through Godfrey and Delhi. By the mid-1950s, a more direct route for US 67 from Godfrey to Jacksonville via Greenfield had opened. Heading north from Downtown Alton, US 67 was rerouted via an abandoned railroad grade to the north end of town.

Between Fort Bellefontaine, Missouri (near Lewis Bridge) and south of St. Louis, US 67 followed two different routes. US 67 originally followed Lewis and Clark Boulevard, Florissant Avenue, 7th Street, and Broadway south through St. Louis. US 67 Bypass followed Lindbergh Boulevard around the city. Route 99 was an inner bypass within the city limits, following Kingshighway Boulevard and Riverview Boulevard between Route 30 (Gravois Road) and US 67 (Florissant Avenue). US 67 replaced Route 99 in the mid-1950s, using Loughborough Avenue at the south end, and the old route south of downtown became an extension of US 67 Alternate, which had begun downtown and crossed into Illinois towards Alton. (The old US 67 north of downtown was mostly US 66 City.) Later, in the late 1960s, US 67 moved to the bypass, and the old route, where not turned back to the city, became Route 267 and Route 367.

== Future ==
The portion of US 67 between the Arkansas state line and Poplar Bluff is slated to be upgraded into an extension of Interstate 57. US 67 between Poplar Bluff and Route 158 is already mostly a freeway with only two at-grade intersections. Planning is underway to build the next ten miles of freeway between Route 158 and County Road 274 south of Neelyville, just 2 miles north of the Arkansas border. However, it is currently unclear as to when and where exactly the highway will tie into the Arkansas side, as the Arkansas Department of Transportation has not yet determined a route to finish their portion of the US 67 freeway. Interchange improvement at Route 158 and US Route 160 to convert it to a Dumbbell interchange starts August 22, 2022. A future segment that’s funded for construction extends from County Road 352 to near Neelyville. This project will include upgrading the segment to four lanes and possible access upgrades at Neelyville. Tentatively, this could be let as early as March 2026.

== Junction list ==
County	Location	mi	km	Destinations	Notes
Butler	Neely Township	0.000	0.000	US 67 south	Continuation into Arkansas
Butler	Neelyville	4.659	7.498	Route 142 – Neelyville, Naylor	
Butler	Beaver Dam Township	11.700	18.829	US 160 west / Route 158 east – Doniphan, Harviell	Interchange
Butler	Poplar Bluff	17.541	28.230	US 67 Bus. north / Route M to Route 53 – Poplar Bluff	Interchange
Butler	Poplar Bluff	20.208	32.522	Route PP – Poplar Bluff	Interchange; access to Black River Medical Center, John J. Pershing VA Medical Center, and Three Rivers Community College
Butler	Poplar Bluff	21.992– 23.110	35.393– 37.192	Future I-57 north / US 60 east / US 60 Bus. east / US 67 Bus. south – Sikeston, Poplar Bluff	Interchange; southern end of US 60 concurrency
Butler	Black River Township	27.435	44.152	US 60 west – Van Buren, Springfield	Interchange; northern end of US 60 concurrency; access to Ozark National Scenic Riverways
Butler	Black River Township			Route JJ	
Wayne	Black River Township	35.441	57.037	Route 49 north / Route 172 east – Williamsville, Chaonia	Access to Lake Wappapello State Park
Wayne	Saint Francois Township			Route F	
Wayne	Saint Francois Township			Route A – Williamsville	
Wayne	Greenville	48.077	77.372	US 67 Bus. north to Route D	Access to Lake Wappapello
Wayne	Greenville	49.882	80.277	US 67 Bus. south to Route E	
Wayne	Silva	54.106	87.075	Route 34 – Piedmont, Marble Hill	Interchange; access to Sam A. Baker State Park and Clearwater Lake
Wayne	Cedar Creek Township			Route K	
Wayne	Coldwater			Route EE – Coldwater	
Wayne	Twelvemile Township			Route N	
Madison	Central Township			US 67 Bus. north	
Madison	Cherokee Pass			Route C – Central, Saco	
Madison	Cherokee Pass			Route A – Marquand	
Madison	Millcreek			US 67 Bus. north / Route E – Arcadia	Interchange
Madison	Fredericktown			US 67 Bus. / Route 72 to Route Z – Arcadia, Fredericktown	Interchange; access to Madison Medical Center, Historic Downtown Fredericktown, and Arcadia Valley
Madison	Mine La Motte Township			Route H – Farmington	
Saint Francois	Knob Lick			Route DD	
Saint Francois	Pendleton Township			Route H – Farmington	
Saint Francois	Farmington			Route 221 (Columbia Street) / Route W – Doe Run	Interchange; access to Historic Downtown Farmington and Arcadia Valley
Saint Francois	Farmington			Maple Street	Interchange
Saint Francois	Farmington			Route 32 east – Farmington	Interchange; southern end of Route 32 concurrency; access to Parkland Health Center
Saint Francois	Park Hills			Fairgrounds Drive — Park Hills, Missouri, Leadington	Interchange
Saint Francois	Park Hills			Route 32 west / US 67 Bus. north – Leadington, Park Hills	Interchange; northern end of Route 32 concurrency; access to Mineral Area College, Missouri Mines State Historic Site, and St. Joe State Park
Saint Francois	Park Hills			Koen Creek Turnaround	Interchange
Saint Francois	Park Hills			Parkway Drive	Interchange
Saint Francois	Desloge			Route 8 west / US 67 Bus. south – Desloge, Park Hills	Interchange
Saint Francois	Bonne Terre			Old Orchard Road / Vo-Tec Road	Interchange: access to Parkland Health Center
Saint Francois	Bonne Terre			Route 47 north / Route K – Bonne Terre, Terre du Lac	Interchange
Saint Francois	Big River Township			Route Y – French Village	
Saint Francois	Big River Township			Route JJ	
Jefferson	Valle Township			Route V – Valles Mines	Interchange
Jefferson	Plattin Township			Route JJ	
Jefferson	Olympian Village			Route 110 west / Route CC – De Soto, Olympian Village	Interchange
Jefferson	Festus			Route CC	
Jefferson	Festus			I-55 – Saint Louis, Cape Girardeau	Exit 174 on I-54
Jefferson	Festus			US 61 / Great River Road – Sikeston	Southern end of US 61 concurrency
Jefferson	Festus			Route A	
Jefferson	Pevely			Route Z	
Jefferson	Barnhart			Route M – Antonia	
Jefferson	Arnold			Route 231 – Oakville, Lemay	
Jefferson	Arnold			Route 141 – Fenton	
Saint Louis	Mehlville			I-255 southwest – East Saint Louis, Alton	Direct access to southwest-bound I-255 and from northeast-bound I-255 only; full access signed at US 50
Saint Louis	Mehlville			I-255 northeast / US 50 / Route 267 – East Saint Louis, Alton, Lemay	Southern end of US 50 concurrency; direct access to northeast-bound I-255 and from southwest-bound I-255 only
Saint Louis	See US 50				
Saint Louis	Kirkwood			I-44 / US 50 / Historic US 66 – Joplin, Kansas City	Northern end of US 50 concurrency; exit 277B on I-44
Saint Louis	Kirkwood			Route 100 – Des Peres, Saint Louis	
Saint Louis	Frontenac			I-64 / US 40 / US 61 north / Avenue of the Saints – Chesterfield, Saint Louis	Northern end of US 61 concurrency; exit 28A on I-64
Saint Louis	Creve Coeur			Monsanto Drive	Interchange; access to Monsanto Company
Saint Louis	Creve Coeur			Route 340 – Chesterfield, Wellston	Interchange; no direct access from southbound US 67 to westbound Route 340, nor from westbound Route 340 to northbound US 67
Saint Louis	Maryland Heights			Route D (Page Avenue)	Interchange
Saint Louis	Bridgeton			Route 180 – Saint Louis	Interchange
Saint Louis	Bridgeton			I-70 – Saint Louis, Kansas City	Exits 235A-B on I-70
Saint Louis	Bridgeton			Route B (Natural Bridge Road) / Lambert International Boulevard	Interchange
Saint Louis	Bridgeton	Tunnel underneath Missouri Air National Guard (Saint Louis)			
Saint Louis	Hazelwood			I-270 – Bridgeton, Florissant	Exit 25 on I-270
Saint Louis	Spanish Lake			Route 367 – Bellefontaine Neighbors, Saint Louis	Interchange
Missouri River				Lewis Bridge (Missouri River)	
Saint Charles	West Alton			Route 94 – Saint Charles	
Mississippi River				US 67 north continues via the Clark Bridge into Illinois	
1.000 mi = 1.609 km; 1.000 km = 0.621 mi: Concurrency terminus; Incomplete access

U.S. Route 67
Previous state: Arkansas	Missouri	Next state: Illinois
