= Lindbergh Boulevard =

- Part of: US 50 / US 61 / US 67
- Namesake: Charles Lindbergh
- Owner: State of Missouri
- Maintained by: MoDOT
- Length: 31.8 mi (51.2 km)
- Location: Mehlville–Spanish Lake, Missouri
- South end: Barracksview Road in Mehlville
- Major junctions: I-255 / US 50 East in Mehlville US 61 / US 67 in Mehlville; I-55 in Mehlville; I-44 / US 50 West in Kirkwood; I-64 / US 40 in Frontenac; I-70 in Bridgeton I-270 in Hazelwood
- North end: US 67 / Route 367 in Spanish Lake

Construction
- Completion: c. 1930

Lindbergh Boulevard, named after the aviator, Charles Lindbergh, is a section of U.S. Routes 61 and 67 that extends through Missouri. Lindbergh Boulevard is home to Missouri's only traffic tunnel underneath a runway at Lambert–St. Louis International Airport.

== History ==
Lindbergh Boulevard was initially a bypass of St. Louis, designated in about 1930 as Route 77 from Mehlville to the Chain of Rocks Bridge. The part north of Dunn Road, where Route 77 turned off to access the bridge, was initially Route M and later Route 140. Route 77 was later extended at the south end to the Jefferson Barracks Bridge, and US 61 and US 66 were realigned onto the bypass, leaving only this extension as Route 77. That portion became part of US 50 when it was moved onto the bridge, and US 67 eventually replaced Route 140. Prior to Lindbergh crossing the Atlantic ocean, it was named Denny Rd. after the great Denny family of St. Louis.

== Route description ==
Lindbergh Boulevard is signed as US 67 for most of its length and additionally as US 61 south of I-64/US 40. However, between Lemay Ferry Road and its southern terminus at I-255, it carries only US 50. Traveling north, at Lemay Ferry Road, it picks up US 61 and US 67 at Lemay Ferry Road while the latter continues as Route 267. It loses US 50 to I-44, at which point US 61 and US 67 continue north as Kirkwood Road, named after the suburb they pass through. The name Lindbergh Blvd is resumed north of Route 100. Shortly thereafter comes the interchange with I-64/US 40 where US 61 is lost to them traveling westbound. The remainder of Lindbergh Blvd, signed only as US 67, travels north through various communities before turning eastward north of I-270. From Florissant northward, US 67 continues as Highway 67 North, discontinuing the Lindbergh name. US 67 continues northeast towards the northern terminus of Route 367.

== Major intersections ==
The entire route is in St. Louis County.

Location	mi	km	Destinations	Notes
Mehlville	0.0	0.0	I-255 / US 50 west – East St. Louis, Alton; Barracksview Road	Southern terminus, south end of US 50 concurrency
Mehlville	0.2	0.32	US 61 south / US 67 south / Route 267 north (Lemay Ferry Road)	South end of US 61/US 67 concurrency
Mehlville	1.0	1.6	I-55 – Chicago, Memphis	I-55 exit 197
Green Park	2.4	3.9	Route 21 (Tesson Ferry Road)	
Sunset Hills	4.2	6.8	Route 30 (Gravois Road)	
Sunset Hills	6.3	10.1	Route 366 (Watson Road)	Interchange
Sunset Hills	6.6	10.6	I-44 / US 50 east – Tulsa	I-44 exit 277, north end of US 50 concurrency
Kirkwood	9.4	15.1	Route 100 (Manchester Road)	
Frontenac	11.8	19.0	I-64 / US 40 / US 61 north / Avenue of the Saints – Wentzville, St. Louis	I-64 exit 28, northern end of US 61 concurrency, national southern terminus of the Avenue of the Saints
Creve Coeur	14.1	22.7	Monsanto Drive	Interchange
Creve Coeur	14.6	23.5	Route 340 (Olive Boulevard)	Interchange
Maryland Heights	16.3	26.2	Route D (Page Avenue)	Interchange
Maryland Heights	17.0	27.4	Dorsett Road, Midland Boulevard	Interchange
Bridgeton	19.3	31.1	Route 180 (St. Charles Rock Road)	Interchange
Bridgeton	19.7	31.7	I-70 – Indianapolis, Kansas City	I-70 exit 235
Bridgeton	20.1	32.3	Natural Bridge Road, Innovation Way	Interchange
Bridgeton	21.8	35.1	Missouri Bottom Road – Lambert International Airport	
Hazelwood	23.5	37.8	I-270 – St. Louis	I-270 exit 25
Spanish Lake	31.8	51.2	US 67 north / Route 367 south (Lewis and Clark Boulevard)	Northern terminus, north end of US 67 concurrency
1.000 mi = 1.609 km; 1.000 km = 0.621 mi: Concurrency terminus
