= Glencoe, Missouri =

Unincorporated community in Missouri, U.S.

Coordinates: 38°32′40″N 90°37′25″W

Glencoe is an unincorporated community in western St. Louis County, Missouri, United States. It is located on the west side of the Meramec River, north of Eureka in the southern part of Wildwood and is just off Route 109.

== History ==
Glencoe was named after Glen Coe in Scotland, the site of the Massacre of Glencoe.
