= Missouri Route 100 =

State highway in Missouri, U.S.

Route 100
- Route 100 highlighted in red

Route information
- Maintained by MoDOT
- Length: 121.144 mi (194.962 km)

Major junctions
- West end: US 50 in Linn
- I-44 / US 50 in Gray Summit; I-270 in Des Peres; US 61 / US 67 near Kirkwood
- East end: Chouteau Avenue at the I-44 / I-55 overpass in St. Louis

Location
- Country: United States
- State: Missouri
- Counties: Osage, Gasconade, Franklin, St. Louis, St. Louis City

Highway system
- Missouri State Highway System; Interstate; US; State; Supplemental
← Route 99	→ Route 101

Route 100, also named Manchester Road through St. Louis County and Manchester Avenue and Chouteau Avenue through St. Louis City, is a state highway in the U.S. state of Missouri. It runs from Linn, Missouri at U.S. Route 50 to Interstate 55 in St. Louis. The highway is 121 miles (195 km) long.

== Route description ==
Route 100 begins at US 50 in Linn. The highway heads north from Linn until it encounters the Missouri River, where it turns eastward to parallel the river. At Chamois, Missouri, it serves as the northern terminus of Route 89. It then enters Gasconade County near Morrison and bridges the Gasconade River near its mouth at the eponymous town. In the county seat, Hermann, Route 100 has a short concurrency with Route 19. The highway passes through New Haven, in Franklin County, 14 miles (23 km) later. The highway then intersects Route 185 at its northern terminus, and Route 47 in Washington. It becomes an expressway outside the city limits, which runs to near Gray Summit. Route 100 crosses over Interstate 44 two times, with an interchange providing access to the freeway.

Northeast of Gray Summit, Route 100 crosses into St. Louis County, entering the city limits of Wildwood at the same time. Just north of the intersection with Route T, the highway becomes an expressway again. In Wildwood, it has an interchange with Route 109. Route 100 then enters Ellisville, where the expressway ends. From here all the way into St. Louis, the highway also carries the local name Manchester Road. In Ellisville, Route 340 (Clarkson Road) meets its southern terminus. Route 100 then proceeds into Ballwin. It then divides Manchester from Winchester, Missouri before wholly entering Manchester, where it has a single-point urban interchange (SPUI) with Route 141. Route 100 then runs through a swath of unincorporated territory en route to Des Peres. The route crosses over Interstate 270, the St. Louis beltway, in that town. East of Des Peres, Route 100 enters Kirkwood; there, Manchester Road intersects Kirkwood Road (the name given to Lindbergh Boulevard in Kirkwood), which carries US 61/67. Route 100 then passes through the smaller suburbs of Warson Woods, Glendale, Rock Hill, Brentwood, and Maplewood.

After leaving Maplewood, Route 100 continues into the independent City of St. Louis where the name changes from "Manchester Road" to "Manchester Avenue." As Manchester Avenue crosses Vandeventer Avenue, the highway becomes Chouteau Avenue. Route 100 continues east on Chouteau Avenue towards Downtown St. Louis. The route ends just east of South Broadway, at the Interstate 55 overpass. Due to the nearby east terminus of I-44, there is no interchange with I-55 at the state route's terminus.

== The Lewis and Clark Trail ==
Most of Route 100 is part of the Lewis and Clark Trail. From Kirkwood Rd in Kirkwood to three miles (5 km) west of Wildwood is one section, where the trail turns off on Route T. Route T will eventually end, once again, at Route 100 northwest of I-44 and continue down Route 100 all the way to five miles (8 km) north of Linn (where Route 100 ends), and the Lewis and Clark Trail turns off onto Route C.

== History ==
Much of the road between St. Louis and Gray Summit was the original U.S. Route 66, though this was only temporary until US 66 moved to its later location at what is now Watson Rd (Route 366) and Interstate 44. During, and after US 66 was moved off Manchester Rd, the road remained part of U.S. Route 50 for many years.

== Major intersections ==
County	Location	mi	km	Destinations	Notes
Osage	Linn	0.000	0.000	US 50 (Main Street) – Linn, Loose Creek	
Osage	Luystown	5.410	8.707	Route C / Lewis and Clark Trail – Frankenstein	Western end of Lewis and Clark Trail overlap
Osage	Chamois	17.840	28.711	Route 89 – Linn	
Gasconade	Hermann	41.181	66.274	Route 19 (South Market Street) – Swiss	Western end of Route 19 overlap
Gasconade	Hermann	41.895	67.423	Route 19 (North Market Street)	Eastern end of Route 19 overlap
Franklin		62.301	100.264	Route 185 south – Beaufort	
Franklin	Washington	70.379	113.264	Route 47 – Union, Warrenton	
Franklin		76.957	123.850	Route T east / Route V west / Lewis and Clark Trail east – Labadie, Union	Eastern end of Lewis and Clark Trail overlap
Franklin		80.178	129.034	Route AT west / Historic US 66 west to I-44 / US 50	Western end of Historic US 66 overlap
Franklin		82.173	132.245	I-44 BL east / Historic US 66 east	Eastern end of Historic US 66 overlap; west end of I-44 Bus. / Historic US 66 (1926–1933) overlap
Franklin		82.218– 82.231	132.317– 132.338	I-44 / US 50 – St. Clair, Pacific	I-44 exit 253; east end of I-44 Bus. overlap
Franklin	Gray Summit	82.692	133.080	Route MM north – Labadie	
Franklin		88.046	141.696	Route OO south – Pacific	
St. Louis	Wildwood	89.602	144.200	Historic US 66 (1926-1933) east (Manchester Road)	Eastern end of Historic US 66 (1926–1933) overlap
St. Louis	Wildwood	93.161	149.928	Route T west / Lewis and Clark Trail west – St. Albans	Western end of Lewis and Clark Trail overlap
St. Louis	Wildwood	95.798	154.172	Route 109 (Eatherton Road)	Interchange
St. Louis	Wildwood	97.319	156.620	Historic US 66 (1926-1933) west (Manchester Road)	Western end of Historic US 66 (1926–1933) overlap
St. Louis	Ellisville	99.042	159.393	Route 340 east (Clarkson Road)	
St. Louis	Manchester	103.221– 103.230	166.118– 166.133	Route 141	Interchange
St. Louis	Des Peres	106.321	171.107	Des Peres Road	Interchange
St. Louis	Des Peres	106.584– 106.598	171.530– 171.553	I-270 – Chicago, Memphis	I-270 exit 9
St. Louis	Kirkwood	109.046	175.493	US 61 / US 67 / Lewis and Clark Trail east / Historic US 66 (1936-1965) (North Kirkwood Road)	Eastern end of Lewis and Clark Trail overlap
City of St. Louis		114.582	184.402	Historic US 66 (1926-1933) east (McCausland Avenue)	Eastern end of Historic US 66 (1926–1933) overlap
City of St. Louis		117.655	189.347	Historic US 66 (1926-1933) west (Boyle Avenue)	Western end of Historic US 66 (1926–1933) overlap
City of St. Louis		120.674	194.206	Historic US 66 (Tucker Boulevard)	Eastern end of Historic US 66 (1926–1933) overlap
City of St. Louis		121.144	194.962	3rd Street	Eastern end of state maintenance (under I-44 / I-55)
1.000 mi = 1.609 km; 1.000 km = 0.621 mi: Concurrency terminus

== See also ==
- List of state highways in Missouri
