= Pendleton Township =

Pendleton Township may refer to:

- Pendleton Township, Jefferson County, Illinois
- Pendleton Township, St. Francois County, Missouri
