= Old Clark Bridge =

Former Illinois/Missouri Mississippi River crossing

Clark Bridge
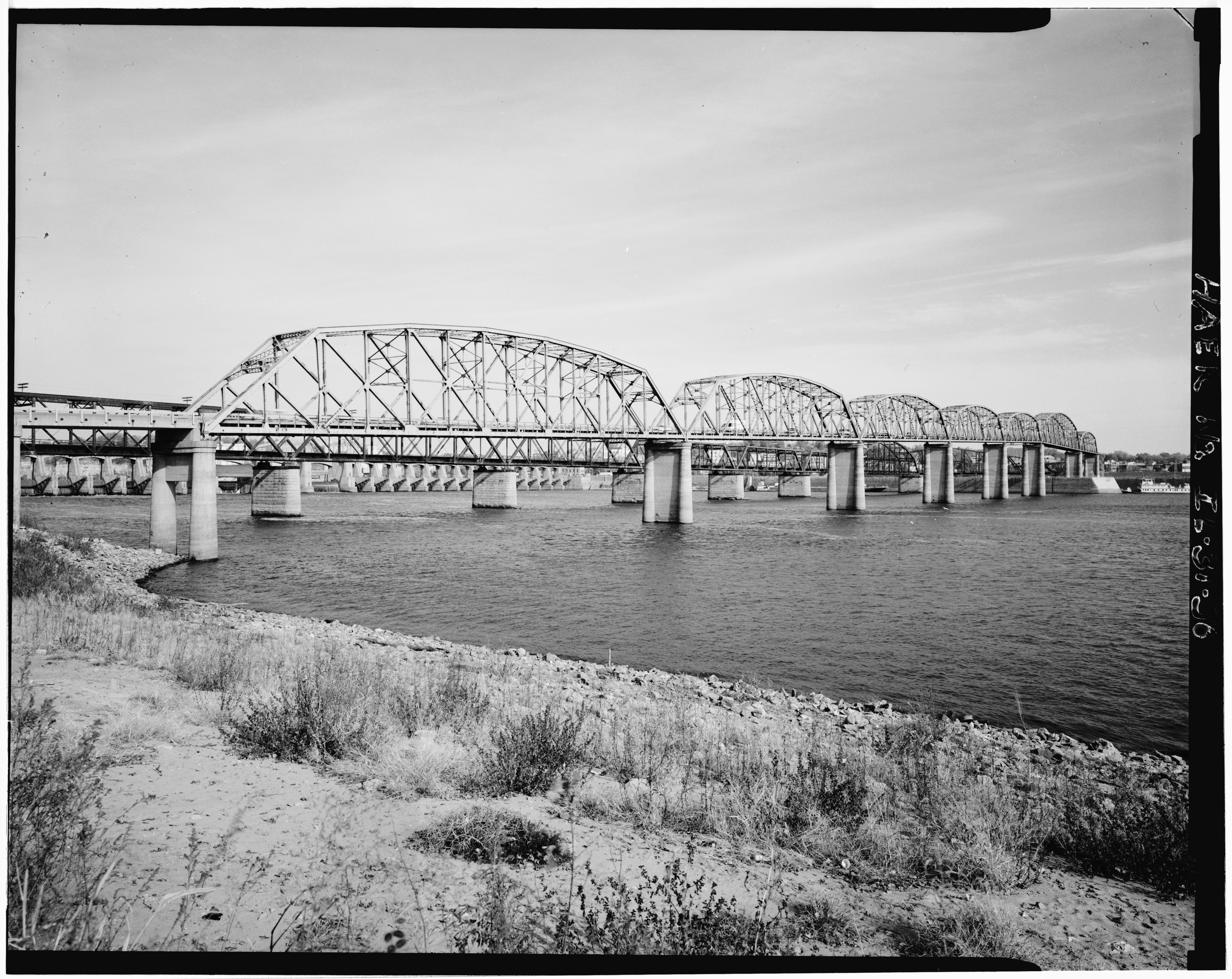
- Detail view of highway bridge, showing railroad bridge and lock and dam in background, looking northeast (upstream).
- Coordinates: 38°53′01″N 90°10′57″W
- Carries: 2 lanes of US 67
- Crosses: Mississippi River
- Locale: West Alton, Missouri and Alton, Illinois

Characteristics
- Design: Truss

History
- Opened: July 16, 1928
- Closed: January 5, 1994

Location
- Interactive map of Clark Bridge

The Old Clark Bridge was a bridge that carried U.S. Route 67 across the Mississippi River between West Alton, Missouri and Alton, Illinois. It was constructed beginning in 1927, was replaced by the Clark Bridge and was demolished in 1994. The bridge was initially a toll bridge.

== Notes ==
- Built by Alton-St. Louis Bridge Company, with construction starting in 1927.
- Closed for major repairs in 1959 and 1975.
- Demolished via explosives on August 21 and September 14, 1994.

== See also ==
- List of crossings of the Upper Mississippi River
- Lock and Dam No. 26 (historical)
