= Missouri Route 109 =

State highway in Missouri, U.S.

Route 109
- MO 109 highlighted in red

Route information
- Maintained by MoDOT
- Length: 13.128 mi (21.127 km)

Major junctions
- South end: Route W / Route FF in Jefferson County
- I-44 / US 50 in Eureka; Route 100 in Wildwood
- North end: Route CC (Wild Horse Creek Road) in Chesterfield

Location
- Country: United States
- State: Missouri
- Counties: Jefferson, St. Louis County

Highway system
- Missouri State Highway System; Interstate; US; State; Supplemental
| ← Route 108 | → Route 110 (CKC) |

Route 109 is a state highway in St. Louis County, Missouri and Jefferson County, Missouri. Its northern terminus is at Wild Horse Creek Road in Chesterfield; its southern terminus is at Routes W and FF in Jefferson County. The road continues north, curves around Spirit of St. Louis Airport and connects with Chesterfield Airport Road, providing a "backway" to the Chesterfield area.

== History ==
=== Route description ===
The Missouri Department of Transportation commissioned Route 109 sometime between 1937 and 1938 as a state-maintained access road to Babler Memorial State Park from Route C in St. Louis County. What is now the current alignment of Route 109 was then designated as Route C and ran north from Route 100 to its terminus at Route CC (Wild Horse Creek Road) in Chesterfield. The portion of Route 109 running south from Route 100 was signed as Route B and terminated at Interstate 44.

Sometime between 1956 and 1957, the Route 109 designation was extended to cover Route C south of Babler State Park and Route B between Route 100 and Interstate 44. A bridge was built over the Meramec River linking Route W from Jefferson County to Route 109's southern terminus at Interstate 44 in 1974, but this bridge was later designated to carry Route 109 into Jefferson County, moving its southern terminus to the intersection of Routes W and FF just south of the Meramec River.

In 1999, Route C was fully decommissioned in St. Louis County. Route 109 assumed Route C's previous alignment and the old section of Route 109 that ran to Babler State Park was renamed Route BA (the only such route designation in Missouri). This change renamed the last remaining section of Route 109's original routing.

== Major intersections ==
| County | Location | mi | km | Destinations | Notes |
|---|---|---|---|---|---|
| Jefferson | | 0.000 | 0.000 | Route W south / Route FF south – House Springs, Catawissa | |
| St. Louis | Eureka | 2.186 | 3.518 | I-44 / US 50 – St. Louis, Rolla | exit 264 |
| St. Louis | Wildwood | 8.376 | 13.480 | Route 100 – Ellisville, Gray Summit | Interchange |
| St. Louis | | 9.998 | 16.090 | Route BA north – Babler State Park | |
| St. Louis | | 12.397 | 19.951 | Route BA south – Babler State Park | |
| St. Louis | | 13.128 | 21.127 | Route CC east (Wild Horse Creek Road) / Eatherton Road | |
1.000 mi = 1.609 km; 1.000 km = 0.621 mi
