= Missouri Route 366 =

State highway in Missouri, U.S.

Route 366
- Route 366 highlighted in red

Route information
- Maintained by MoDOT
- Length: 12.000 mi (19.312 km)
- Existed: 1979–present

Major junctions
- West end: I-44 / I-270 / US 50 in Sunset Hills
- US 50 / US 61 / US 67 in Sunset Hills; Route 30 in St. Louis
- East end: Broadway / Chippewa in St. Louis

Location
- Country: United States
- State: Missouri
- Counties: St. Louis, St. Louis City

Highway system
- Missouri State Highway System; Interstate; US; State; Supplemental
← Route 364	→ Route 367

Route 366 is a highway located completely within the St. Louis metropolitan area. It is primarily a former section of U.S. Route 66. Beginning at South Broadway/South Jefferson Avenue in St. Louis and ending at the Interstate 44/Interstate 270 interchange in Sunset Hills, it was established in 1979 when US 66 was decertified between Chicago, Illinois and Joplin, Missouri.

Through the several suburbs of St. Louis it is known as Watson Road, while in the city of St. Louis itself, it is named Chippewa Street.

== History ==
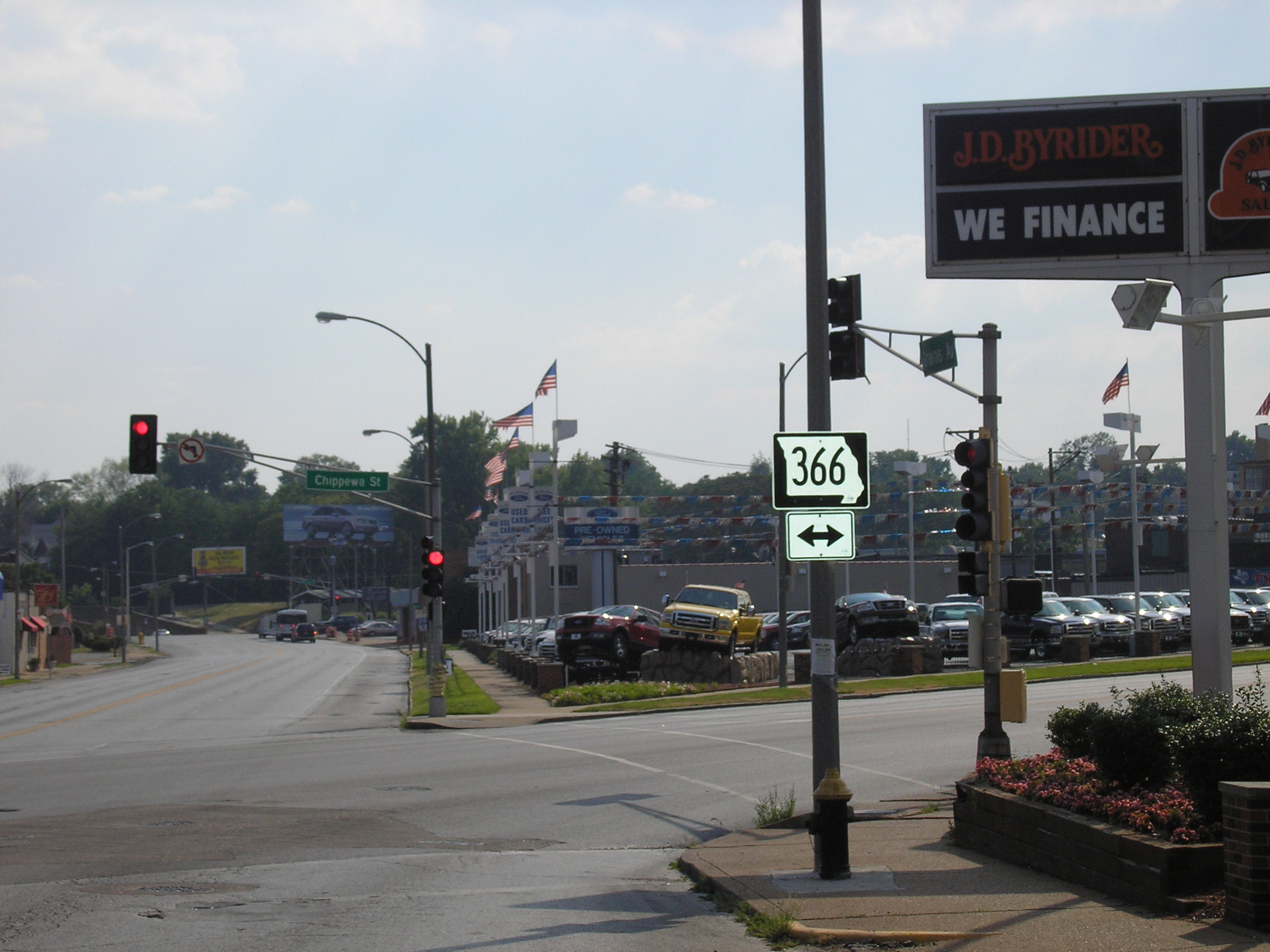
Route 366 in St. Louis, intersecting Gravois Avenue

For 20 years, Route 366 was the only non-Interstate route in the City of St. Louis maintained by the State of Missouri. It officially extended eastward only to Brannon Avenue, two blocks west of South Kingshighway Boulevard.

In 1999, the Route 366 designation was extended east several miles, to include the remaining section of Chippewa Street that was previously part of United States Route 66 (from Chippewa to Gravois, where U.S. Route 66 had historically turned northeastward toward downtown St. Louis), as well as the section east of Gravois as far as South Broadway/South Jefferson Avenue which had never been part of U.S. Route 66.

== Major intersections ==
County	Location	mi	km	Destinations	Notes
St. Louis	Sunset Hills	0.000	0.000	I-44 west / US 50 west – Tulsa Historic US 66 ends	Western termini of Rte. 366 and Historic US 66; west end of Historic US 66 concurrency; exit 277A on I-44
St. Louis	Sunset Hills	0.15– 0.166	0.24– 0.267	I-270 – Chicago, Memphis	Westbound exit and eastbound entrances; exit 5A on I-270
St. Louis	Sunset Hills	1.368	2.202	US 50 / US 61 / US 67 / Historic US 66 west (1936-1965) to I-44 / I-270	Interchange
St. Louis	Mackenzie	6.749	10.861	Route P south (Mackenzie Road)	Northern terminus of Route P
City of St. Louis		7.068	11.375	River Des Peres Boulevard – MetroLink	Interchange
City of St. Louis		10.169	16.365	To 4235-4263 Chippewa Street	Interchange; eastbound exit and westbound entrance
City of St. Louis		10.194	16.406	Frontage roads	Interchange; westbound exit and eastbound entrance
City of St. Louis		10.404	16.744	Route 30 / Historic US 66 east (Gravois Road)	East end of Historic US 66 concurrency
City of St. Louis		11.013	17.724	Grand Boulevard	
City of St. Louis		11.979– 12.000	19.278– 19.312	Jefferson Avenue / Broadway / Chippewa Street east	Eastern terminus; road continues as Chippewa St. east
1.000 mi = 1.609 km; 1.000 km = 0.621 mi: Concurrency terminus; Incomplete access
