= Interstate 270 (Missouri–Illinois) =

Highway in Illinois and Missouri

Interstate 270
- I-270 highlighted in red

Route information
- Auxiliary route of I-70
- Maintained by MoDOT and IDOT
- Length: 50.59 mi (81.42 km)
- Existed: 1956–present
- NHS: Entire route

Major junctions
- South end: I-55 / I-255 in Mehlville, MO
- I-44 / US 50 / Route 366 in Sunset Hills, MO; Route 100 in Des Peres, MO; I-64 / US 40 / US 61 in Town and Country, MO; Route 364 in Maryland Heights, MO; I-70 in Bridgeton, MO; Route 370 in Bridgeton, MO; US 67 in Hazelwood, MO; I-170 in Hazelwood, MO; I-255 / IL 255 near Pontoon Beach, IL
- East end: I-55 / I-70 near Troy, IL

Location
- Country: United States
- Counties: MO: St. Louis, City of St. Louis; IL: Madison

Highway system
- Interstate Highway System; Main; Auxiliary; Suffixed; Business; Future
- Missouri State Highway System; Interstate; US; State; Supplemental
- Illinois State Highway System; Interstate; US; State; Tollways; Scenic
← Route 269	MO	→ Route 273
← IL 267	IL	→ I-280

Interstate 270 (I-270) makes up a large portion of the outer belt freeway in Greater St. Louis. The counterclockwise terminus of I-270 is at the junction with I-55 and I-255 in Mehlville, Missouri; the clockwise terminus of the freeway is at the junction with I-55 and I-70 north of Troy, Illinois. The entire stretch of I-270 is 50.59 miles (81.42 km).

I-270 between I-70 and I-55 was formerly designated I-244, a western bypass of St. Louis, Missouri. It was originally proposed by Missouri as I-144, but the road was a beltway (or part of one), so the American Association of State Highway and Transportation Officials (AASHTO) assigned it the number I-244. By the late 1970s, the entire beltway (including today's I-255) was integrated as a part of I-270 for consistency. However, the politicians in Illinois started planning their supplemental freeway system in the mid-1970s, and a five-mile (8.0 km) section of Corridor 413 was included into the Interstate Highway System in April 1978. This caused a potential place of confusion in Pontoon Beach, Illinois, where I-270 would have intersected itself, and eventually the Illinois Department of Transportation (IDOT) decided on the I-255 numbering in 1980 (but not before considering renumbering an eight-mile (13 km) section to I-870).

== Route description ==
In Missouri, I-270 diverges from at I-55 as a 10-lane freeway heading west of I-55's route but still maintaining I-55's tendency to travel northward. I-270 intersects I-44 in a modified cloverleaf interchange that was rebuilt in the 1990s. Railroad overpasses and rocky bluffs between I-44 and Dougherty Ferry Road reduced the interstate to eight lanes for about two miles (3.2 km); however, this section was widened as of late 2013 to five lanes in each direction. I-270 meets up with I-64 with a stack interchange that was built from 1987 to 1993 (it was previously a cloverleaf that was a frequent source of backups).

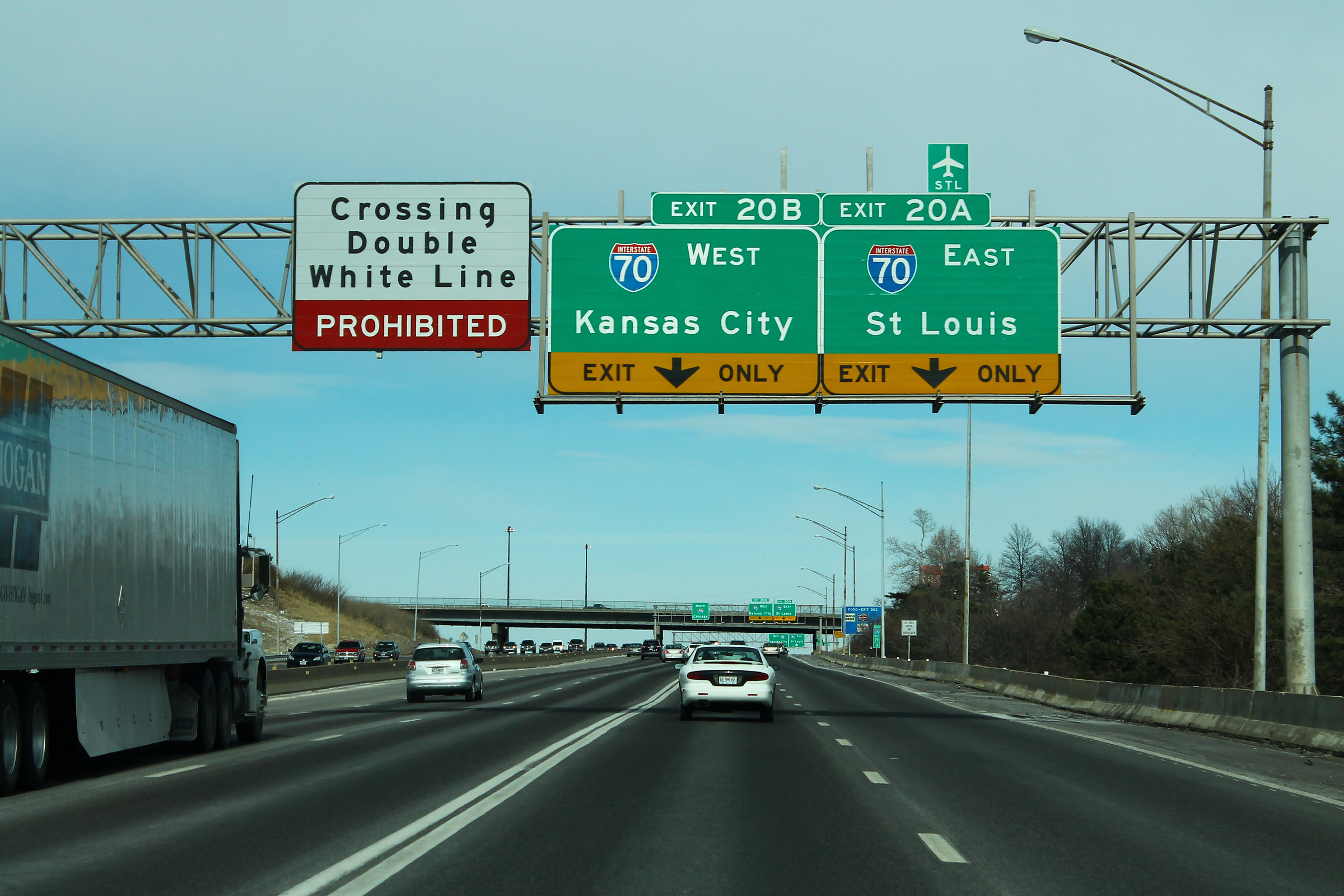
Double white lines visible on northbound I-270 at I-70

From Dougherty Ferry Road through I-70, it continues as a 10-lane Interstate, although the right lanes often serve as exit lanes. The intersection with Route 340 (Olive Boulevard) was upgraded to a single-point urban interchange in the mid-2000s, and, during 2010–2011, the interchanges with Route 364 (Page Avenue) and Dorsett Road were upgraded with the latter becoming a diverging diamond interchange in October 2010. Congestion in this area is severe to the point the Missouri Department of Transportation (MoDOT) has spent millions on various traffic control improvements since the 1990s. One of the safety improvements is a "double white line" that motorists are not permitted to cross (violation of that could lead to a fine of $500) that is located at the exits for I-70 in the northbound lanes. Other safety implementations include a special Maryland Heights police cruiser that is dedicated to traffic enforcement on this section of I-270, congestion warning signs, and traffic cameras.

At I-70, I-270 makes a transition from a north–south highway to an east–west highway though not signed as such until James S. McDonnell Boulevard and will eventually become a six-lane highway by the time it reaches U.S. Route 67 (US 67, North Lindbergh Boulevard). It then meets I-170, which had its interchange rebuilt from 2001 to 2004 during which a left exit lane in the westbound lane was corrected. This section of I-270 was a source of frequent backups during the late-afternoon hours until the interchange was rebuilt. A fatal accident in September 1999 spurred the rebuilding of the interchange, although the accident did not occur at that location happening a mile (1.6 km) east of the interchange. I-270 then passes various streets where every westbound exit connects to Dunn Road (and one must use Dunn Road to access I-270 with the only exceptions being the Route 367, Lilac Avenue, and Riverview Drive exits). Since Dunn Road handles two-way traffic, this has become a safety and congestion issue that MoDOT wants to address in the near future. Since 2012, a pickle jar has been sitting on a barrier wall near the Missouri I-270 exit 9.

At Lilac Avenue, I-270 constricts to four lanes as it crosses the Mississippi River on the New Chain of Rocks Bridges. Leaving Missouri and entering Illinois, I-270 transitions from a suburban Interstate to an exurban Interstate with farm fields and wooded land bordering the Interstate in the area to the immediately east and west of the river crossing. Once it crosses the Chain of Rocks Canal, I-270 will intersect four different highways providing access to communities in western Madison County: Illinois Route 3 (IL 3), Old Alton Road, IL 203, and IL 111. The interchange with IL 3 is a partial cloverleaf with the loop ramps in the northeast and southeast quadrants. The remaining two are cloverleaf interchanges, with the Old Alton Road/IL 203 interchange using a collector–distributor system with two folded diamonds due to the presence of railroad tracks between the two roadways. Once it passes IL 111, the speed limit increases to 65 mph (105 km/h) as the highway briefly becomes six lanes again with the junction with I-255. The highway then reverts to a four-lane highway offering diamond interchanges with IL 157 and IL 159 before meeting up with I-55/I-70 at the interchange that IDOT refers as the "3 I's". The eastbound I-270 meets the northeastbound combination of I-55 and I-70 which leave the intersection as northbound I-55 and eastbound I-70 which has adopted I-270's mile markings.

== History ==
The section of I-270 on the Missouri side was completed by June 1964, while the section that was I-244 was completed by November 1968. The section from IL 3 to I-55 in Illinois was finished by May 1965.

During the Great Flood of 1993, the New Chain of Rocks Bridge carrying I-270 over the Mississippi River was the only bridge open from St. Louis to Keokuk, Iowa, at one point. (All other bridges from the McKinley Bridge to the Keokuk Bridge were closed at the peak of that flood.)

The last major construction project on I-270 occurred from 1995 to 1998. Both MoDOT and IDOT upgraded I-270 to modern standards from Lilac Avenue to I-255. However, this section of I-270 is still at two lanes in each direction.

On September 13, 1999, a fatal accident involving a tractor-trailer occurred in the westbound lanes of I-270 in front of the now-defunct St. Thomas Aquinas-Mercy High School (now North County Christian School) in northern St. Louis County. This accident sped up efforts that led to the I-170/I-270 interchange reconstruction that went from 2001 to 2004.

A major accident and fire from a FedEx Ground truck between the Route 367 and Lilac Avenue exits on October 28, 2002, forced detours and lengthy delays.

There were plans to sign an eight-mile (13 km) section of I-270 from Glen Carbon to Edwardsville as I-870. However, this idea was discarded.

In 2008, MoDOT implemented new variable speed limits on I-270/I-255 with the normal limit being 60 mph (97 km/h). However, due to complaints from the public, these signs were planned to be updated in 2011 to advisory signs. A five-mile (8.0 km) section of I-270 between I-44 and Manchester was widened to five lanes in each direction, with work taking place between 2012 and 2013. This section of I-270 sees up to 185,000 vehicles per day, and rush hour congestion is common.

=== Constructions ===
IDOT wanted to widen I-270 from Lilac Avenue to I-255 from four lanes to six, but no money was available at the time of the proposal in 2007. However, IDOT has announced that nearly $100 million has been programmed for replacement of the canal bridges between 2011 and 2016. The canal bridges were replaced in mid-2014, and the old deck was imploded late 2015.

MoDOT has also identified the need of improving the I-270 corridor in northern St. Louis County, which could cost in the range of $200 million. The agency planned to widen the freeway from US 67 to Route 367 and rebuild every interchange (except I-170) and overpasses in this section. MoDOT held a public study of this corridor and has a website of this. Construction eventually began in spring 2020 and is expected to conclude in December 2023 at a price of under $300 million.

== Exit list ==
State	County	Location	mi	km	Exit	Destinations	Notes
Missouri	St. Louis	Mehlville–Concord line	0.000– 0.269	0.000– 0.433	1A	I-55 north – St. Louis	Southern terminus; exit 197 on I-55
Missouri	St. Louis	Mehlville–Concord line	0.000– 0.269	0.000– 0.433	1A	US 61 / US 67 (Lemay Ferry Road)	Southbound left exit only
Missouri	St. Louis	Concord	0.000– 0.269	0.000– 0.433	1A	I-55 south – Memphis	Southbound exit and northbound entrance; exit 196 on I-55
Missouri	St. Louis	Concord	0.000– 0.269	0.000– 0.433	—	I-255 east – Chicago	Southbound left exit and northbound left entrance; clockwise terminus of I-255
Missouri	St. Louis	Concord–Sappington line	2.162	3.479	2	Route 21 (Tesson Ferry Road)	
Missouri	St. Louis	Sunset Hills	3.903	6.281	3	Route 30 (Gravois Road)	
Missouri	St. Louis	Sunset Hills	5.832– 6.503	9.386– 10.466	5	I-44 / US 50 / Route 366 east (Watson Road) – St. Louis, Tulsa	Signed as exits 5A (east) and 5B (west); exit 276 on I-44
Missouri	St. Louis	Kirkwood	7.888	12.695	7	Big Bend Road	Southbound exit and northbound entrance
Missouri	St. Louis	Des Peres	8.729	14.048	8	Dougherty Ferry Road	
Missouri	St. Louis	Des Peres	9.855– 10.396	15.860– 16.731	9	Route 100 / Lewis and Clark Trail (Manchester Road)	Also serves West County Center Drive
Missouri	St. Louis	Town and Country	12.386– 12.985	19.933– 20.897	12	I-64 / US 40 / US 61 (Avenue of the Saints) – Wentzville, St. Louis	Exit 25 on I-64
Missouri	St. Louis	Creve Coeur	13.847	22.285	13	Route AB (Ladue Road)	
Missouri	St. Louis	Creve Coeur	14.993	24.129	14	Route 340 (Olive Boulevard)	
Missouri	St. Louis	Maryland Heights	16.486	26.532	16	Route D east (Page Avenue)	Signed as exit 16A southbound; western terminus of Route D
Missouri	St. Louis	Maryland Heights	17.082	27.491	16	Route 364 west – St. Charles	Signed as exits 16B southbound; eastern terminus of Route 364, exits 20A-B on route 364
Missouri	St. Louis	Maryland Heights	17.945	28.880	17	Dorsett Road	Diverging diamond interchange; orientation changes from north–south to east–west
Missouri	St. Louis	Bridgeton	19.956– 21.047	32.116– 33.872	20	I-70 – Kansas City, St. Louis	Signed as exits 20A (east) and 20B (west); exits 232A-B on I-70; access to St. Louis Lambert International Airport
Missouri	St. Louis	Bridgeton	21.074	33.915	20	Route 180 (St. Charles Rock Road) / Natural Bridge Road	Signed as exit 20C; access to SSM Health-DePaul
Missouri	St. Louis	Bridgeton	22.440– 23.122	36.114– 37.211	22B	Route 370 – St. Charles County	Signed as exit 22 westbound; eastern terminus of Route 370
Missouri	St. Louis	Bridgeton	23.137	37.235	22A	Missouri Bottom Road	Eastbound exit and westbound entrance
Missouri	St. Louis	Hazelwood	23.832	38.354	23	McDonnell Boulevard	
Missouri	St. Louis	Hazelwood	25.257– 25.731	40.647– 41.410	25	US 67 (Lindbergh Boulevard)	Signed as exits 25A (south) and 25B (north) westbound
Missouri	St. Louis	Hazelwood	26.366	42.432	26A	I-170 south – Clayton, Lambert–St. Louis International Airport	Northern terminus of I-170; exits 10A-B on I-170; full Y interchange
Missouri	St. Louis	Hazelwood	26.888	43.272	26B	North Hanley Road / Graham Road	
Missouri	St. Louis	Florissant	27.860	44.836	27	Route N (New Florissant Road)	
Missouri	St. Louis	Florissant	28.375	45.665	28	Washington Street / Elizabeth Avenue	
Missouri	St. Louis	Florissant	29.875	48.079	29	West Florissant Avenue	
Missouri	St. Louis	Florissant	30.580	49.214	30	Route AC (New Halls Ferry Road)	
Missouri	St. Louis	Florissant	31.120	50.083	30A	Old Halls Ferry Road	Westbound exit and eastbound entrance
Missouri	St. Louis	Moline Acres	31.100	50.051	31	Route 367 – St. Louis, Alton IL	Signed as exits 31A (south) and 31B (north)
Missouri	St. Louis	Bellefontaine Neighbors	33.077	53.232	32	Bellefontaine Road	
Missouri	St. Louis	Bellefontaine Neighbors	34.062	54.817	33	Lilac Avenue	
Missouri	City of St. Louis		35.167	56.596	34	Riverview Drive (Route H)	
Mississippi River			35.339 0.00	56.873 0.00	New Chain of Rocks Bridge		
Illinois	Madison	Granite City	2.73	4.39	3	IL 3 / Great River Road north / Great River Road Spur south – Granite City, Alton	Western end of concurrency with GRR; signed as exits 3A (south) and 3B (north) eastbound
Illinois	Madison	Chouteau Township	4.39	7.07	4	IL 203 south / Old Alton Road – Granite City	Two interchanges served by collector-distributor roads
Illinois	Madison	Pontoon Beach	5.92	9.53	6	IL 111 / Great River Road south – Pontoon Beach, Wood River	Eastern end of concurrency with GRR; former cloverleaf interchange converted to a diverging diamond interchange
Illinois	Madison	Pontoon Beach	7.16	11.52	7	I-255 south – Memphis IL 255 north – Alton	Signed as exits 7A (south) and 7B (north) westbound; exit 30 on I-255
Illinois	Madison	Glen Carbon			9	IL 157 – Collinsville, Edwardsville	
Illinois	Madison	Glen Carbon	11.87	19.10	12	IL 159 – Collinsville, Edwardsville	
Illinois	Madison	Pin Oak Township	14.57	23.45	15A	I-55 south / I-70 west – St. Louis	Eastbound exit and westbound entrance; exit 20B on I-55
Illinois	Madison	Pin Oak Township	14.57	23.45	15B	I-55 north – Chicago, Springfield	Exits 20A-B on I-55
Illinois	Madison	Pin Oak Township	14.57	23.45		I-70 east – Effingham, Indianapolis	Northern terminus
1.000 mi = 1.609 km; 1.000 km = 0.621 mi: Concurrency terminus; Incomplete access
