= Clark Bridge =

Bridge across the Mississippi River

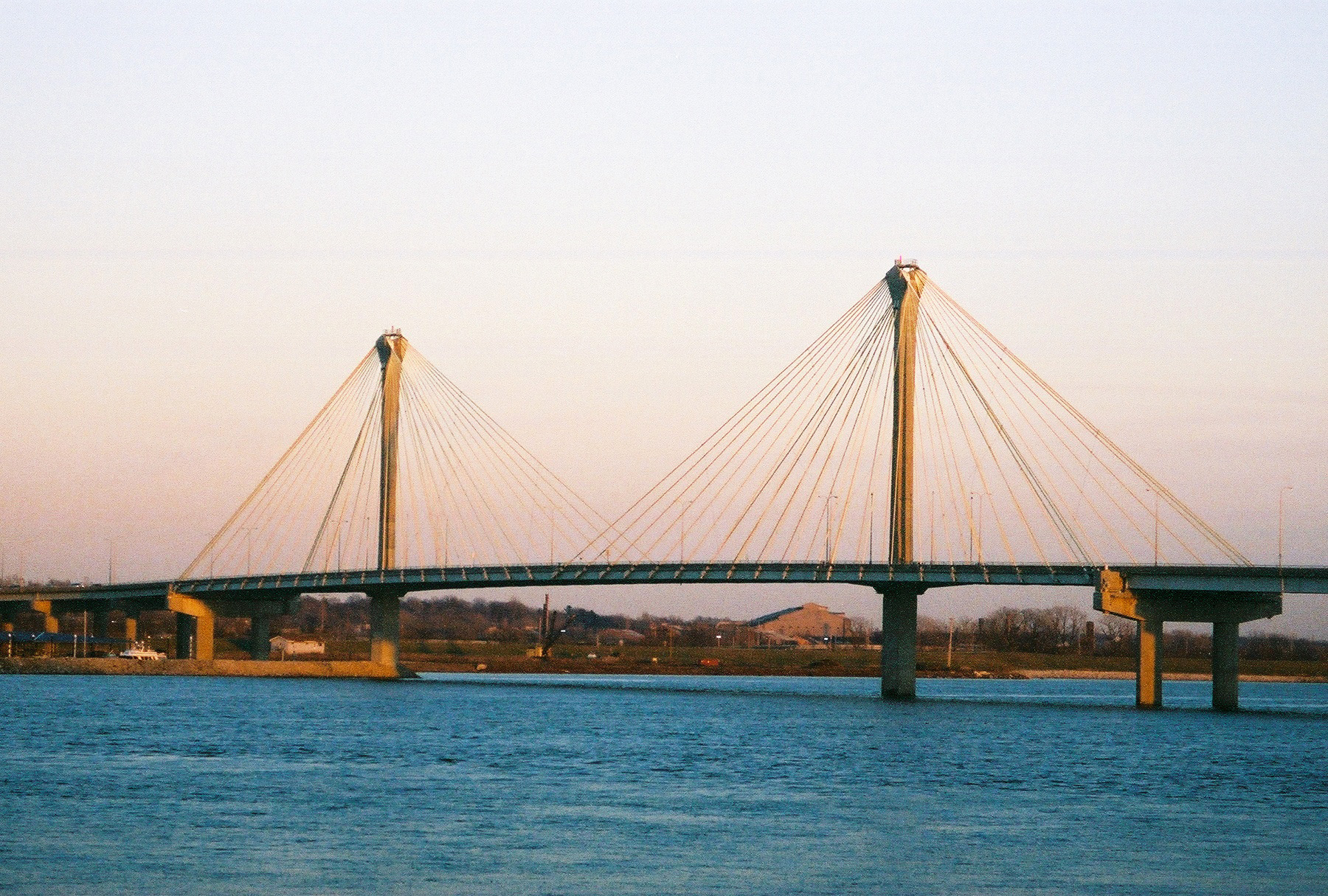
- View from West Alton, Missouri
- Coordinates: 38°52′56″N 90°10′44″W
- Carries: 4 lanes of US 67
- Crosses: Mississippi River
- Locale: West Alton, Missouri and Alton, Illinois
- Other name(s): Clark Superbridge
- Maintained by: Illinois Department of Transportation

Characteristics
- Total length: 4,620 feet (1,408 m)
- Longest span: 756 feet (230 m)

History
- Opened: January 1994

The Clark Bridge is a cable-stayed bridge across the Mississippi River between West Alton, Missouri and Alton, Illinois, United States. Named after explorer William Clark like the bridge it replaced, the bridge opened in 1994. It carries U.S. Route 67 across the river. It is the northernmost river crossing in the St. Louis metropolitan area.

The new $85 million, 108-foot-wide bridge (33 m) replaced the old Clark Bridge, which was only 20 feet (6.1 m) wide. The truss bridge was built in 1928. The new bridge carries two lanes of divided traffic in each direction, as well as two bike lanes. The old bridge carried only two lanes (similar to the upstream Champ Clark Bridge).

The bridge is sometimes referred to as the Super Bridge, and its construction process was documented in the 1997 NOVA episode Super Bridge, which highlighted the challenges of building the bridge, especially during the Great Flood of 1993. Designed by Hanson Engineers under contract to Illinois Department of Transportation (DOT), the Clark Bridge was the first in the United States in which "such a light steel-framed cable-stayed design was combined with a cable saddle type of pylon". The bridge used 8,100 short tons (7,200 long tons; 7,300,000 kg) of structural steel; 44,100 cubic yards (33,700 m^{3}) of concrete; and more than 160 miles (260 km) of cable wrapped with 4 acres (1.6 ha) of yellow plastic piping.

== See also ==
- List of crossings of the Upper Mississippi River
- Lewis Bridge

== Gallery ==
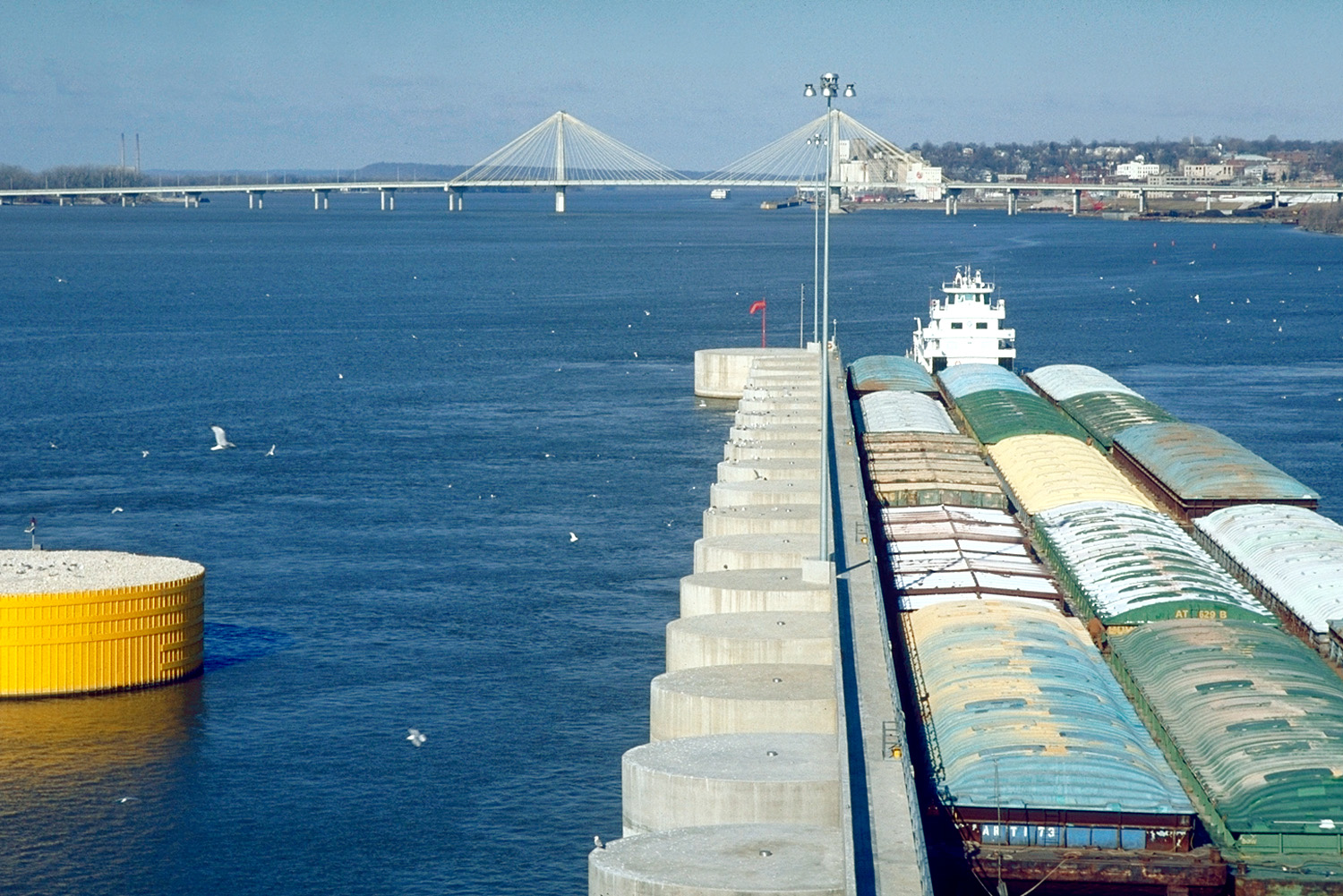
The Clark Bridge. View is upriver to the northwest from the Melvin Price Locks below the bridge

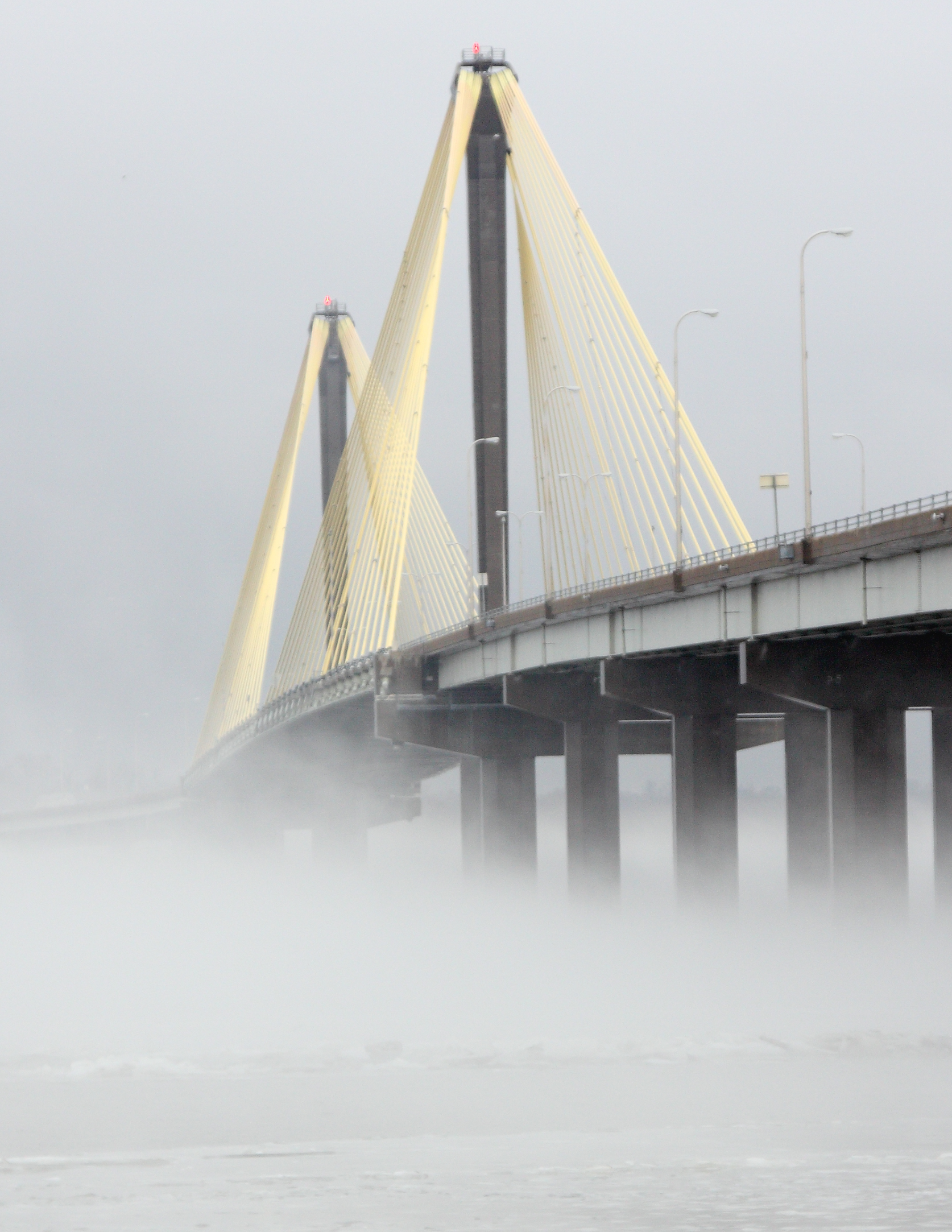
Clark Bridge as seen from the Missouri side of the Mississippi

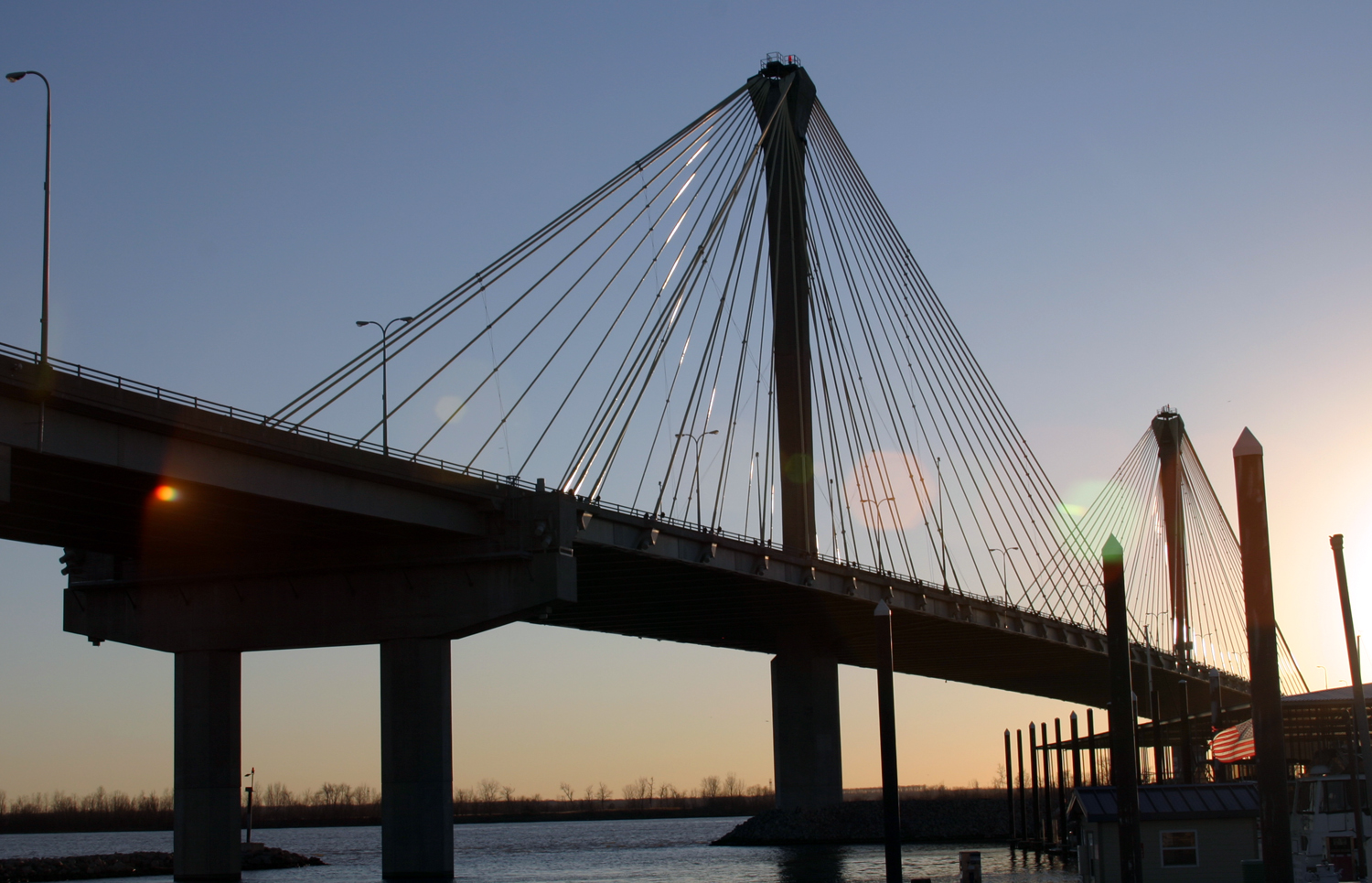
Clark Bridge seen from the Alton Marina

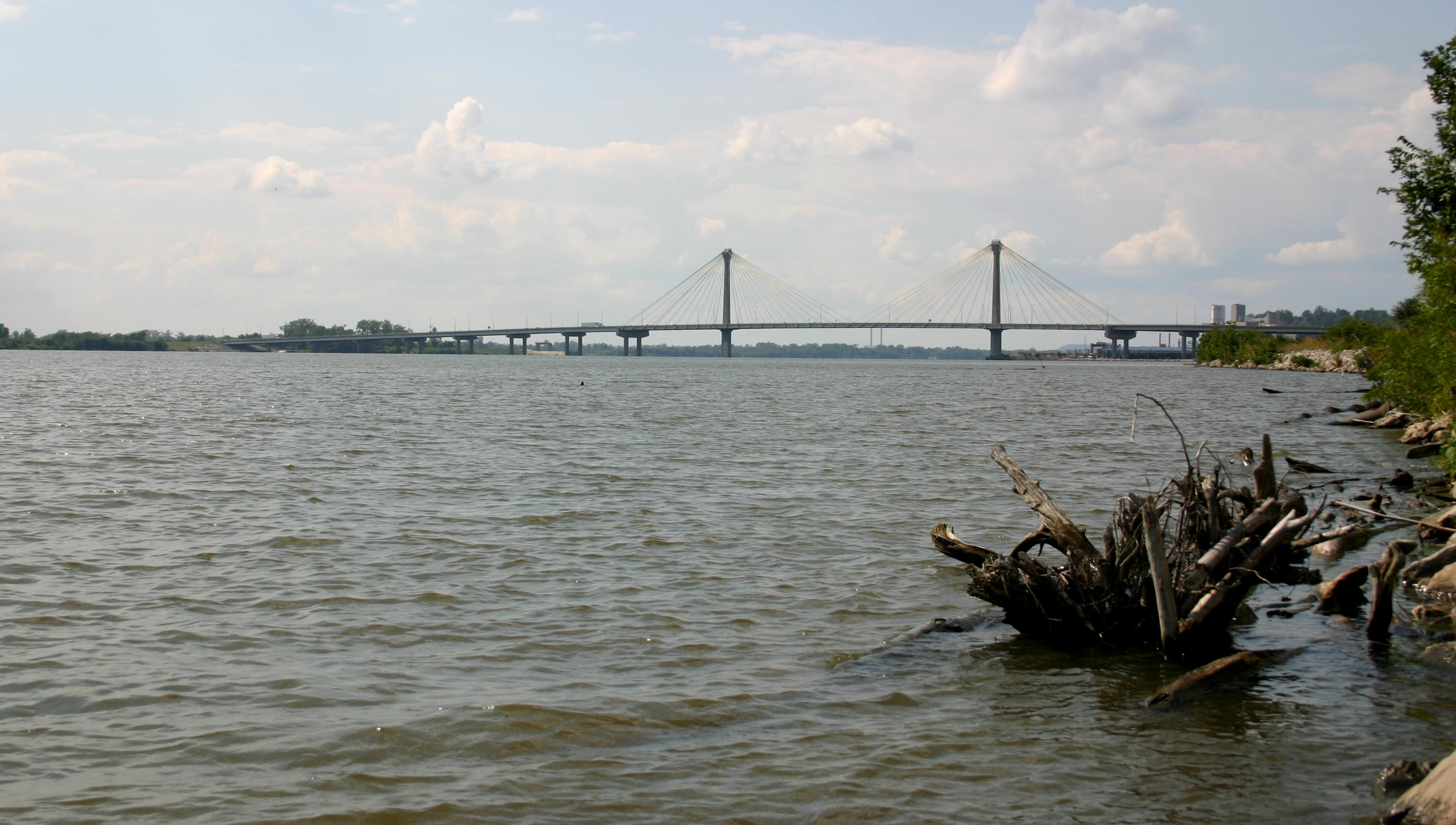

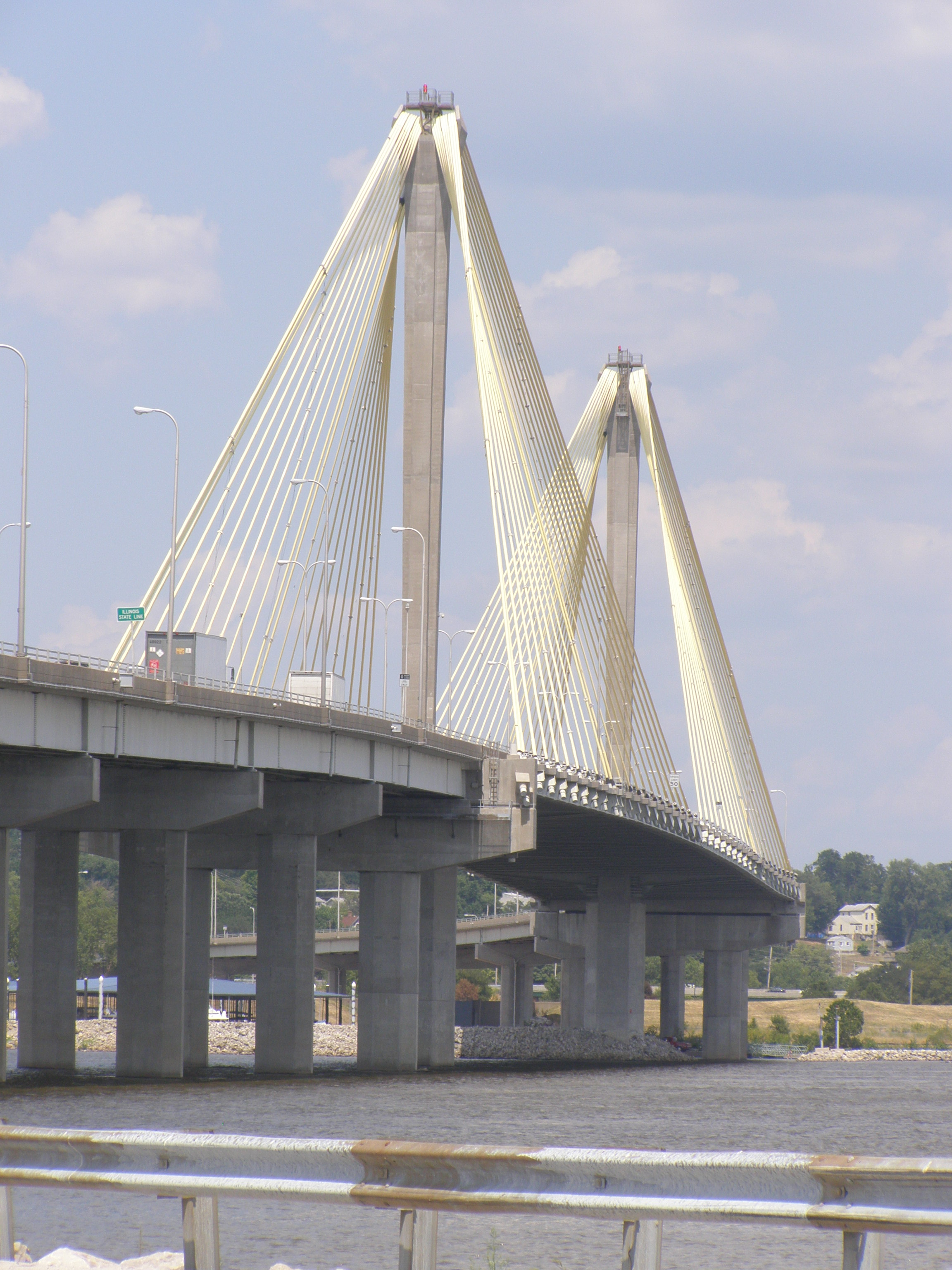
Clark Bridge at Alton, Illinois from the Missouri side.

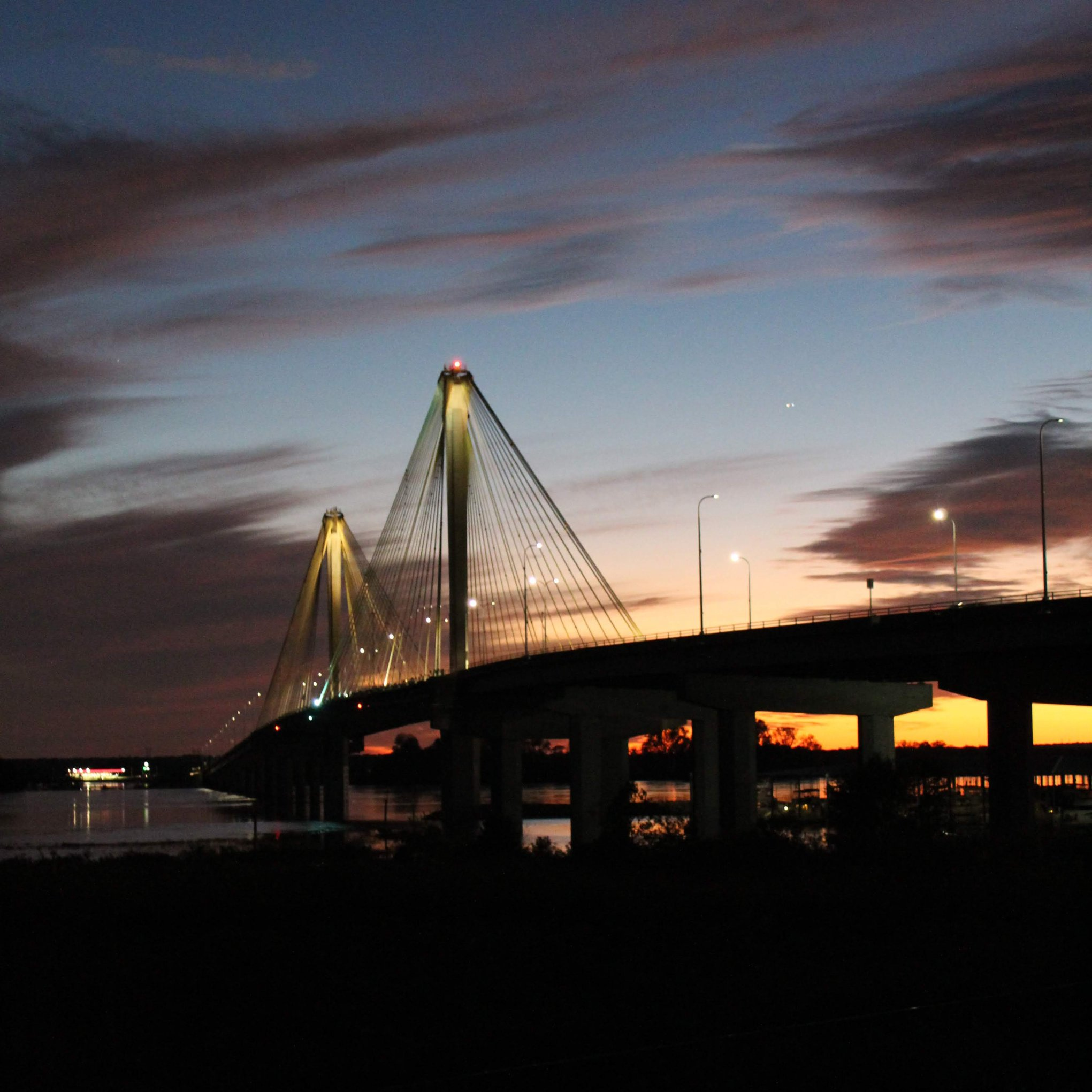
View of the Clark Bridge spanning the Mississippi River from the Alton, Illinois side

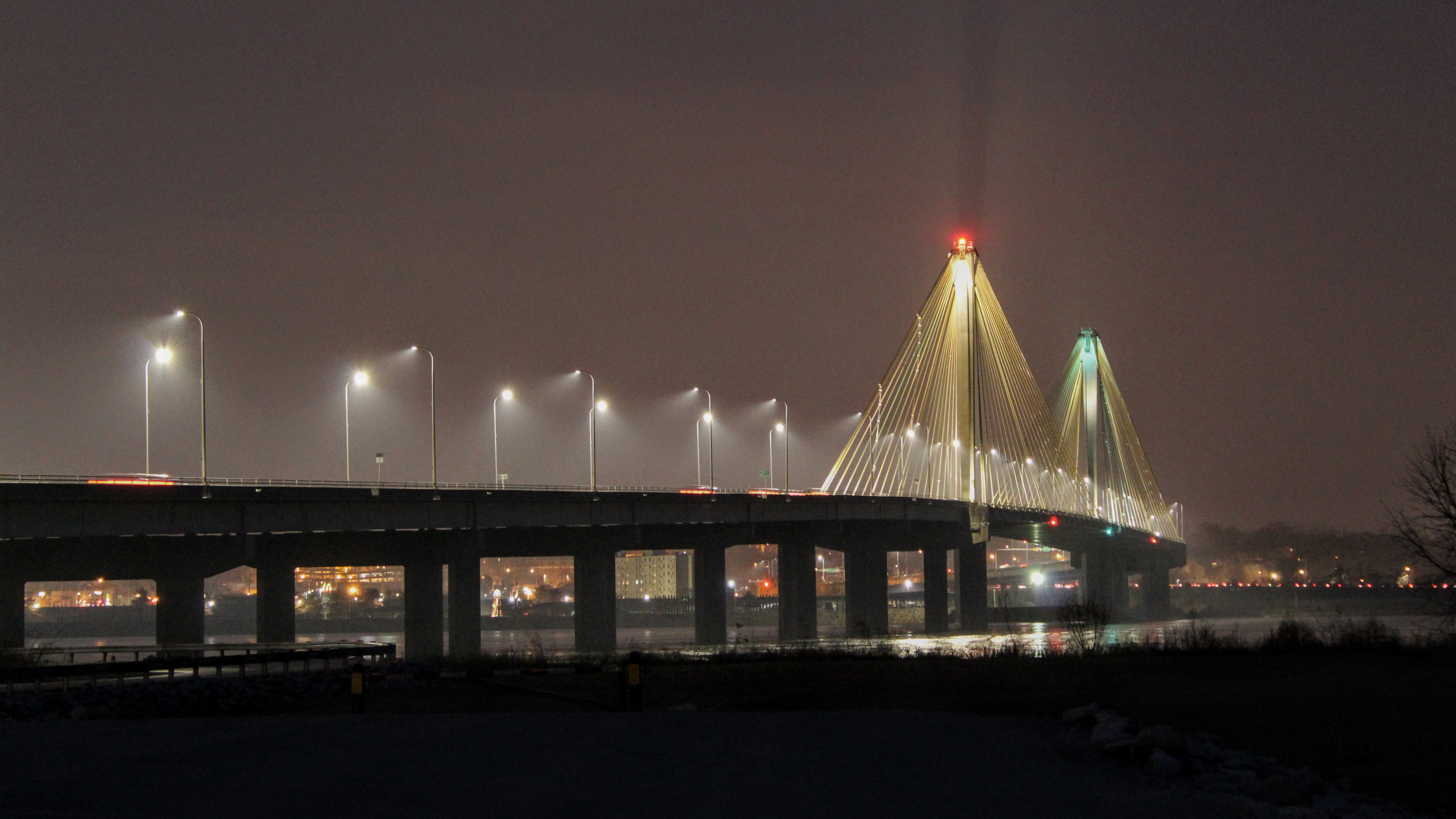
Clark Bridge at night; taken from the Ellis Island Bird Sanctuary, West Alton, Missouri.
