= Missouri Route 340 =

State highway in Missouri, U.S.

Route 340
- MO 340 highlighted in red

Route information
- Maintained by MoDOT
- Length: 19.726 mi (31.746 km)

Major junctions
- West end: Route 100 (Manchester Road) in Ellisville
- I-64 / US 40 / US 61 in Chesterfield; Route 141 in Chesterfield; I-270 in Creve Coeur; US 67 (Lindbergh Boulevard) in Creve Coeur; I-170 in Olivette
- East end: Ferguson Avenue in University City

Location
- Country: United States
- State: Missouri

Highway system
- Missouri State Highway System; Interstate; US; State; Supplemental
← Route 291	→ Route 350

Missouri Route 340 (also called Clarkson Road or Olive Boulevard) is a Missouri state highway in the St. Louis metropolitan area. Its western terminus is Route 100 (Manchester Road) in Ellisville, and its eastern terminus is at an intersection with Ferguson Avenue and Olive Boulevard in University City. The stretch of Route 340 between Manchester Road and the Interstate 64 / U.S. 40 / U.S. 61 interchange is known locally as Clarkson Road. The remainder of Route 340 between this intersection and its eastern terminus is called Olive Boulevard (which does not connect with Olive Street in the city of St. Louis). Route 340 ends at Ferguson Avenue in University City, but Olive Boulevard continues to Skinker Boulevard on the St. Louis city line.

== Route description ==
=== Mass transit ===
MetroBus Route 91 (Olive) travels the entirety of the Olive Street Road and Olive Boulevard part of Route 340 from Chesterfield Mall to the Delmar Loop. Part of MetroBus Route 58X (Twin Oaks Express) travels along the entirety of Clarkson Road.

== Major intersections ==
The entire route is in St. Louis County.

Location	mi	km	Destinations	Notes
Ellisville	0.000	0.000	Route 100 (Manchester Road) / Kiefer Creek Road south	Western terminus
Chesterfield	4.130	6.647	Chesterfield Parkway	Interchange
Chesterfield	4.601	7.405	I-64 / US 40 / US 61 (Avenue of the Saints) – Wentzville, St. Louis	Exit 19B on I-64 / US 40 / US 61
Chesterfield	8.942	14.391	Route 141 (Maryland Heights Expressway)	Single point urban interchange
Creve Coeur	11.503	18.512	I-270	Exit 14 on I-270
Creve Coeur	13.983	22.503	US 67 (Lindbergh Boulevard)	Cloverleaf interchange
Olivette	16.310	26.248	I-170	Exit 3 on I-170
University City	19.726	31.746	Ferguson Avenue / Olive Boulevard east	Eastern terminus
1.000 mi = 1.609 km; 1.000 km = 0.621 mi
