= Lewis Bridge (Missouri River) =

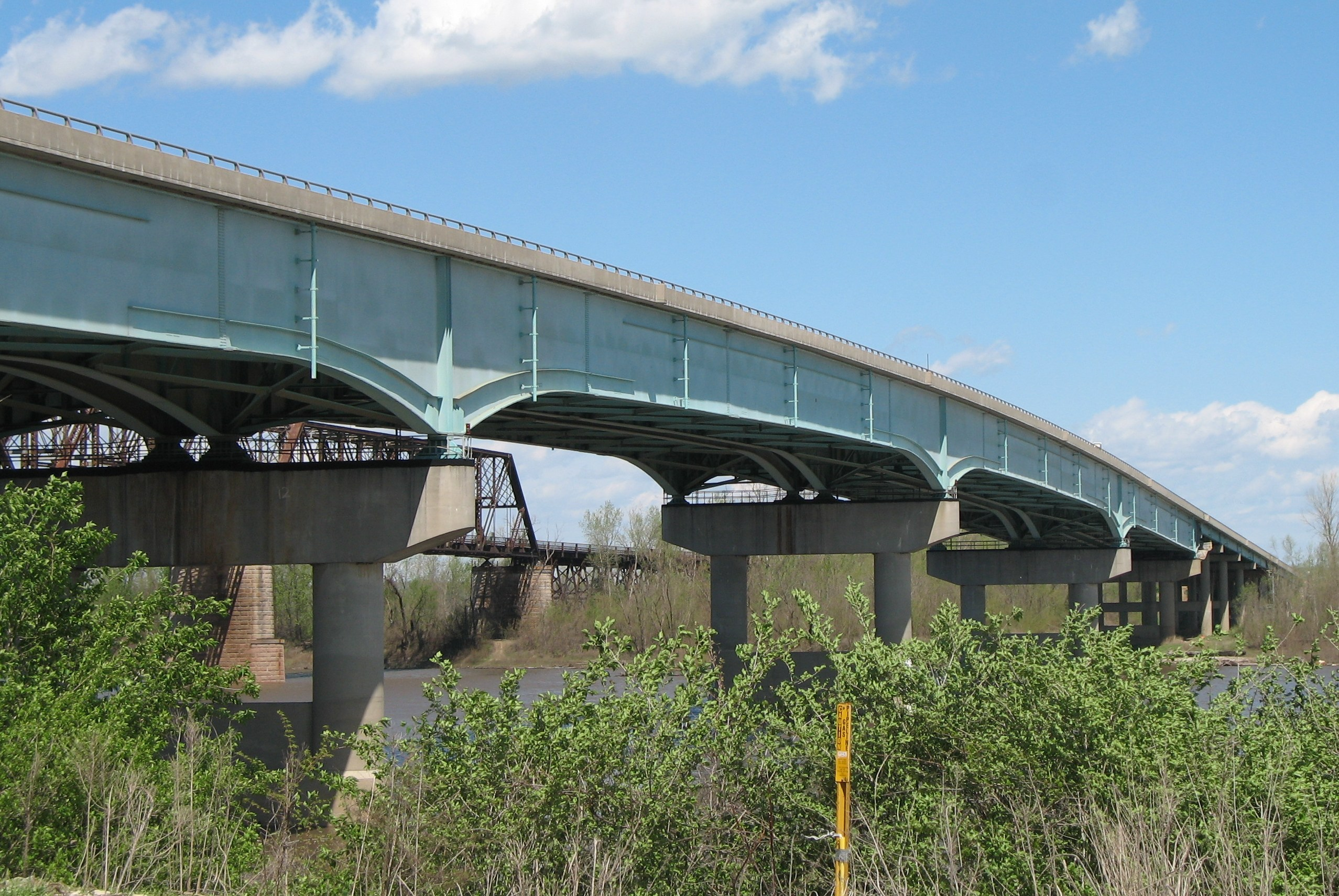
- Coordinates: 38°50′38″N 90°14′03″W
- Carries: 4 lanes of US 67
- Crosses: Missouri River
- Locale: St. Louis County and St. Charles County in Missouri
- Maintained by: Missouri Department of Transportation

Characteristics
- Design: Deck girder bridge
- Total length: 2783 feet
- Width: 83 feet
- Longest span: 430 feet

History
- Opened: 1979

Statistics
- Daily traffic: 23,472 (2006)

The Lewis Bridge is a four lane bridge carrying U.S. Route 67 across the Missouri River between St. Louis County and St. Charles County, Missouri. It replaced an earlier narrow, 2-lane through truss bridge of the same name that ran adjacent to the Bellefontaine Bridge.

The original bridge was opened in 1927; it was replaced in 1979. The new bridge was rehabilitated in 2006.

== See also ==
- List of crossings of the Missouri River
- Clark Bridge
