= Saint Francois Township, Wayne County, Missouri =

Township in the US state of Missouri

Coordinates: 37.1136°N 90.4514°W

Saint Francois Township is an inactive township in Wayne County, in the U.S. state of Missouri.

Saint Francois Township took its name from the St. Francis River.
