= Missouri Route 221 =

State highway in Missouri, U.S.

Route 221
- MO 221 highlighted in red

Route information
- Maintained by MoDOT
- Length: 16.317 mi (26.260 km)
- Existed: c. 2010–2012–present

Major junctions
- West end: Route 21 near Pilot Knob
- East end: US 67 near Farmington

Location
- Country: United States
- State: Missouri
- Counties: Iron, St. Francois

Highway system
- Missouri State Highway System; Interstate; US; State; Supplemental
← Route 215	→ Route 224

Route 221 is a 16.317-mile-long (26.260 km) east–west highway in eastern Missouri. Its western terminus is at Route 21 near Pilot Knob. Its eastern terminus is at U.S. Route 67 (US 67) near Farmington.

== Major intersections ==
County	Location	mi	km	Destinations	Notes
Iron		0.000	0.000	Route 21	
St. Francois		9.040	14.548	Route NN	
St. Francois	Doe Run	12.744	20.509	Route B	
St. Francois		16.140– 16.317	25.975– 26.260	US 67 / Route W	Diverging diamond interchange, existing interchange converted September 2012
1.000 mi = 1.609 km; 1.000 km = 0.621 mi
