= Gray Summit, Missouri =

- Census-designated place
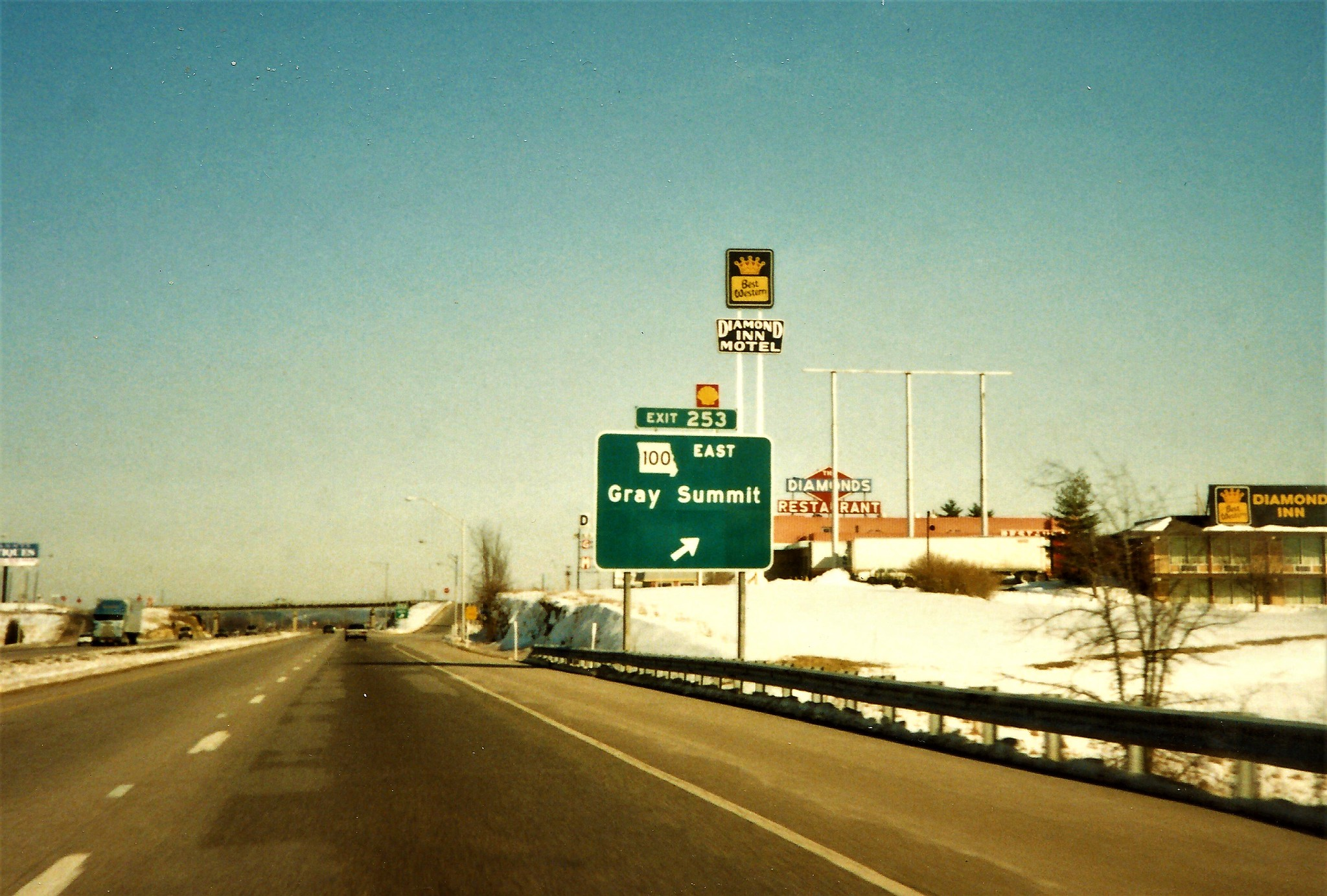
- Interstate 44 at the interchange for Gray Summit, Missouri in 1993.

- Location of Gray Summit, Missouri
- Coordinates: 38°29′42″N 90°48′59″W
- Country: United States
- State: Missouri
- County: Franklin

Area
  - Total: 7.74 sq mi (20.05 km^{2})
  - Land: 7.72 sq mi (20.00 km^{2})
  - Water: 0.019 sq mi (0.05 km^{2})
- Elevation: 682 ft (208 m)

Population (2020)
  - Total: 3,055
  - Density: 395.6/sq mi (152.74/km^{2})
- Time zone: UTC-6 (Central (CST))
  - Summer (DST): UTC-5 (CDT)
- ZIP code: 63039
- Area code: 636
- FIPS code: 29-28918
- GNIS feature ID: 2393025

Gray Summit is an unincorporated community and census-designated place (CDP) in Franklin County, Missouri, United States. As of the 2020 census, Gray Summit had a population of 3,055. Also called "Gray's Summit", it was founded by Daniel Gray of New York, who built a hotel here in 1845. It is located on Missouri Route 100 just north of Interstate 44.

== Geography ==
Gray Summit is located in northeastern Franklin County along Missouri Route 100 and just north of Interstate 44. Missouri Route 100 leads northwest approximately 11 miles (18 km) to Washington from the west end of Gray Summit.

According to the United States Census Bureau, the CDP has a total area of 7.27 square miles (18.83 km^{2}), of which 7.25 square miles (18.78 km^{2}) is land and 0.02 square miles (0.05 km^{2}), or 0.28%, is water.

The post office in Gray Summit.

== Demographics ==
Historical population
Census	Pop.	Note	%±
1990	2,505		—
2000	2,640		5.4%
2010	2,701		2.3%
2020	3,055		13.1%
U.S. Decennial Census

=== 2020 census ===
As of the 2020 census, Gray Summit had a population of 3,055. The median age was 38.7 years. 22.4% of residents were under the age of 18 and 14.3% of residents were 65 years of age or older. For every 100 females there were 102.2 males, and for every 100 females age 18 and over there were 101.4 males age 18 and over.

59.9% of residents lived in urban areas, while 40.1% lived in rural areas.

There were 1,240 households in Gray Summit, of which 29.5% had children under the age of 18 living in them. Of all households, 45.3% were married-couple households, 21.1% were households with a male householder and no spouse or partner present, and 24.3% were households with a female householder and no spouse or partner present. About 28.3% of all households were made up of individuals and 9.0% had someone living alone who was 65 years of age or older.

There were 1,316 housing units, of which 5.8% were vacant. The homeowner vacancy rate was 2.8% and the rental vacancy rate was 2.2%.

Racial composition as of the 2020 census
Race	Number	Percent
White	2,761	90.4%
Black or African American	25	0.8%
American Indian and Alaska Native	9	0.3%
Asian	15	0.5%
Native Hawaiian and Other Pacific Islander	2	0.1%
Some other race	18	0.6%
Two or more races	225	7.4%
Hispanic or Latino (of any race)	69	2.3%

=== 2000 census ===
As of the census of 2000, there were 2,640 people, 953 households, and 739 families residing in the CDP. The population density was 355.1 inhabitants per square mile (137.1/km^{2}). There were 1,032 housing units at an average density of 138.8 per square mile (53.6/km^{2}). The racial makeup of the CDP was 97.80% White, 0.38% African American, 0.23% Native American, 0.15% Asian, 0.08% Pacific Islander, 0.38% from other races, and 0.98% from two or more races. Hispanic or Latino people of any race were 0.34% of the population.

There were 953 households, out of which 37.5% had children under the age of 18 living with them, 64.3% were married couples living together, 8.4% had a female householder with no husband present, and 22.4% were non-families. 17.3% of all households were made up of individuals, and 5.9% had someone living alone who was 65 years of age or older. The average household size was 2.77 and the average family size was 3.12.

In the CDP, the population was spread out, with 27.8% under the age of 18, 8.1% from 18 to 24, 34.0% from 25 to 44, 21.2% from 45 to 64, and 9.0% who were 65 years of age or older. The median age was 35 years. For every 100 females, there were 98.5 males. For every 100 females age 18 and over, there were 97.0 males.

The median income for a household in the CDP was $46,648, and the median income for a family was $53,875. Males had a median income of $38,810 versus $21,723 for females. The per capita income for the CDP was $17,503. About 4.8% of families and 5.1% of the population were below the poverty line, including 5.2% of those under age 18 and 15.5% of those age 65 or over.

== Education ==
The vast majority of Gray Summit is in the Meramec Valley R-III School District. A small piece is in the Washington School District.

The comprehensive high school of the Washington school district is Washington High School.
