= Beaver Dam Township, Butler County, Missouri =

Township in the US state of Missouri

Beaver Dam Township
- Township
- Coordinates: 36°43′40″N 090°20′08″W
- Country: United States
- State: Missouri
- County: Butler

Area
  - Total: 76.01 sq mi (196.86 km^{2})
  - Land: 75.92 sq mi (196.64 km^{2})
  - Water: 0.081 sq mi (0.21 km^{2}) 0.11%
- Elevation: 463 ft (141 m)

Population (2010)
  - Total: 4,473
  - Density: 52/sq mi (20.2/km^{2})
- FIPS code: 29-03826
- GNIS feature ID: 0766349

Beaver Dam Township is one of ten townships in Butler County, Missouri, USA. As of the 2010 census, its population was 4,473. It contains the census-designated place of Harviell.

== Geography ==
Beaver Dam Township covers an area of 76.01 square miles (196.9 km^{2}) and contains no incorporated settlements. It contains nine cemeteries: Bay Springs, Cochran, Dickens, Dunning, Hudgens, Kinsey, Lone Hill, Military and Montgomery.

The streams of Beaverdam Creek, Case Bolt Branch, Dolly Branch, Fletcher Branch, Haw Branch, Kenner Spring Branch and Wolf Creek run through this township.
