= Cherokee Pass, Missouri =

- Census-designated place
- Location within Missouri Location within the United States
- Coordinates: 37°29′29″N 90°18′22″W
- Country: United States
- State: Missouri
- County: Madison

Area
  - Total: 2.09 sq mi (5.42 km^{2})
  - Land: 2.08 sq mi (5.39 km^{2})
  - Water: 0.012 sq mi (0.03 km^{2})
- Elevation: 978 ft (298 m)

Population (2020)
  - Total: 271
  - Density: 130.1/sq mi (50.24/km^{2})
- Time zone: UTC-6 (Central (CST))
  - Summer (DST): UTC-5 (CDT)
- ZIP code: 63645 (Fredericktown)
- Area code: 573
- GNIS feature ID: 2587058
- FIPS Code: 29-13474

Cherokee Pass is an unincorporated community and census-designated place in Madison County, Missouri, United States. As of the 2020 census, it had a population of 271, up from 235 in 2010.

== Geography ==
Cherokee Pass is located on U.S. Route 67 in central Madison County, approximately 5 miles (8 km) south of Fredericktown, the county seat, and 25 miles (40 km) north of Silva. The community sits at an elevation of 978 feet (298 m) on the height of land between north-flowing tributaries of the Little St. Francis River and south-flowing Twelvemile Creek; both waterways are tributaries of the St. Francis River.

According to the U.S. Census Bureau, the Cherokee Pass CDP has an area of 2.09 square miles (5.41 km^{2}), of which 0.01 square miles (0.03 km^{2}), or 0.52%, are water.

== Demographics ==
Historical population
Census	Pop.	Note	%±
2010	235		—
2020	271		15.3%
U.S. Decennial Census
