= Pendleton Township, St. Francois County, Missouri =

Inactive township in the US state of Missouri

Coordinates: 37.7078°N 90.4922°W

Pendleton Township is an inactive township in St. Francois County, in the U.S. state of Missouri.

Pendleton Township was erected in 1821.
