= Missouri Route 267 =

State highway in Missouri, U.S.

Route 267
- Lemay Ferry Road
- Route 267 in red, former segment in grey

Route information
- Maintained by MoDOT
- Length: 4.027 mi (6.481 km)
- Existed: January 1964–present

Major junctions
- South end: US 50 / US 61 / US 67 in Mehlville
- North end: River City Casino Boulevard in St. Louis

Location
- Country: United States
- State: Missouri

Highway system
- Missouri State Highway System; Interstate; US; State; Supplemental
← Route 266	→ Route 269

Route 267 is a short state highway in the St. Louis, Missouri area. Its northern terminus is at Broadway in south St. Louis; its southern terminus is at an intersection with U.S. Route 50 (US 50), US 61, and US 67, locally known as Lindbergh Boulevard (to the east and west) and Lemay Ferry Road to the south. The route is locally known as Lemay Ferry Road.

== Route description ==
Route 267 begins at an intersection with US 50/US 61/US 67 in Mehlville, St. Louis County, heading northeast on four-lane divided Lemay Ferry Road. The road continues past this intersection as part of US 61/US 67. From the southern terminus, the route heads through business areas, becoming a five-lane road with a center left-turn lane. Route 267 loses the center turn lane and continues through suburban areas of homes and commercial establishments. The road gains a median as it heads into more urban areas of residences and businesses before narrowing into a two-lane undivided road. Farther northeast, the route terminates at an intersection with River City Casino Boulevard, just inside the St. Louis city limits. Straight ahead lies Alabama Avenue, which crosses over the River des Peres to continue north into the city.

== History ==
Route 267 was established in January 1964 as part of a set of state highway designations in the St. Louis area, intended to organize numbered routes on local arterial roads under Missouri state maintenance.

Originally, Route 267 continued north beyond its current terminus at River City Casino Boulevard into the City of St. Louis. From its present endpoint, the route continued north on Alabama Avenue, crossed the River des Peres, then turned southeast onto Marceau Street, a four-lane divided roadway passing through residential neighborhoods in south St. Louis before terminating at Broadway.

This northern extension was removed between 2012 and 2015, after which Route 267 was truncated to its present northern terminus near the St. Louis city limits, leaving the sections along Alabama Avenue and Marceau Street without a state route number.

Route 267 is locally known as Lemay Ferry Road for most of its current length and functions as a short connection between U.S. Route 50/61/67 (Lindbergh Boulevard) in Mehlville and the St. Louis city limits.

In the 2020s, the Missouri Department of Transportation planned improvements along the remaining portion of the route, including updates to sidewalks and pedestrian facilities to meet current accessibility standards, reflecting ongoing investment in the corridor’s infrastructure.

== Major intersections ==
County	Location	mi	km	Destinations	Notes
St. Louis	Mehlville	0.000	0.000	US 50 / US 61 / US 67 (Lindbergh Boulevard / Lemay Ferry Road)	
City of St. Louis		4.027	6.481	River City Casino Boulevard / Alabama Avenue north	
1.000 mi = 1.609 km; 1.000 km = 0.621 mi
