= Missouri Route 367 =

State highway in Missouri, U.S.

Route 367

Route information
- Maintained by MoDOT
- Length: 8.960 mi (14.420 km)

Major junctions
- South end: I-70 in St. Louis
- I-270 in Spanish Lake
- North end: US 67 in Spanish Lake

Location
- Country: United States
- State: Missouri

Highway system
- Missouri State Highway System; Interstate; US; State; Supplemental
← Route 366	→ Route 370

Route 367 is a 8.9-mile (14.3 km) long roadway in the metropolitan St. Louis, Missouri, United States area. It is also known as Lewis & Clark Boulevard. Its northern terminus is U.S. Route 67 (US 67) near Black Jack and its southern terminus is at the Interstate 70 (I-70) bridge over Riverview Boulevard before Riverview Boulevard becomes Bircher Boulevard in St. Louis. It was originally part of US 67.

== History ==
In December 2007, a multi-year reconstruction project to convert the St. Louis County portion of Route 367 to freeway status was completed. The road was designed in the 1950s, and needed rebuilding, partly because of very short turn lanes and closely adjacent outer service roads. The new freeway now helps to provide a more direct route between St. Louis and the Alton, Illinois section of the St. Louis Metro East. Existing bridges were replaced at Chambers Road, Coldwater Creek, and the BNSF railroad tracks. South of I-270, Route 367 is planned as more of a parkway, where both arterial and residential streets will continue to intersect the roadway.

In the City of St. Louis portion, no major improvements are planned. This section includes the Halls Ferry Circle, where six major roadways converge.

== Major intersections ==
County	Location	mi	km	Destinations	Notes
City of St. Louis		0.000	0.000	Riverview Boulevard south to I-70	Southern terminus
City of St. Louis		2.068	3.328	Route AC (Halls Ferry Road) / Goodfellow Boulevard	Traffic circle
St. Louis	Moline Acres	4.085	6.574	Chambers Road	Interchange
St. Louis	Spanish Lake	5.458	8.784	I-270 – Kansas City, Chicago, IL	Exit 31 on I-270
St. Louis	Spanish Lake	6.054	9.743	Dunn Road	Interchange
St. Louis	Spanish Lake	6.510	10.477	Redman Road	Interchange
St. Louis	Spanish Lake	7.254	11.674	Parker Road	Interchange
St. Louis	Spanish Lake	8.228	13.242	New Jamestown Road / Jamestown Way Drive	Interchange
St. Louis	Spanish Lake	8.858	14.256	US 67 south (Lindbergh Boulevard)	Northern terminus at an interchange
St. Louis	Spanish Lake	8.960	14.420	US 67 north – Alton, IL	Continuation beyond northern terminus
1.000 mi = 1.609 km; 1.000 km = 0.621 mi
