= West Alton, Missouri =

- City
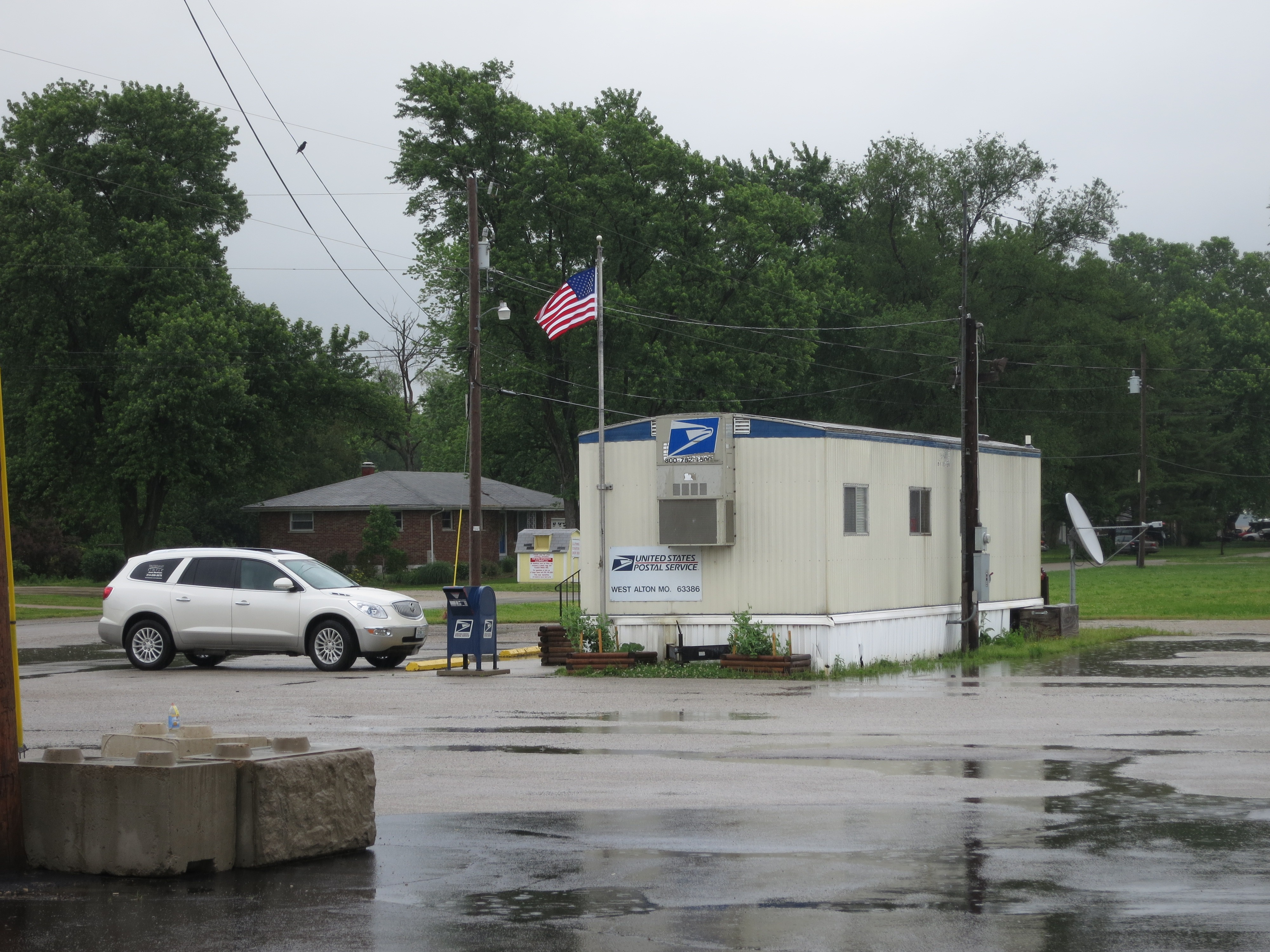
- Post office in West Alton, May 2012

- Location of West Alton, Missouri
- Coordinates: 38°52′4″N 90°13′33″W
- Country: United States
- State: Missouri
- County: St. Charles

Area
  - Total: 37.07 sq mi (96.02 km^{2})
  - Land: 28.81 sq mi (74.62 km^{2})
  - Water: 8.26 sq mi (21.40 km^{2})
- Elevation: 443 ft (135 m)

Population (2020)
  - Total: 359
  - Density: 12.5/sq mi (4.81/km^{2})
- Time zone: UTC-6 (Central (CST))
  - Summer (DST): UTC-5 (CDT)
- ZIP code: 63386
- Area code: 636
- FIPS code: 29-78514
- GNIS feature ID: 0756890
- Website: westaltonmo.com

West Alton is a city in St. Charles County, Missouri, United States. The population was 359 at the 2020 census. It is located at the tip of the peninsula formed by the confluence of the Missouri and Mississippi Rivers and is directly across Alton, Illinois.

== History ==
A post office called West Alton has been in operation since 1895. The community was named from its location on the western bank of the Mississippi River opposite Alton, Illinois.

== Geography ==
According to the United States Census Bureau, the city has a total area of 37.06 square miles (95.98 km^{2}), of which 28.81 square miles (74.62 km^{2}) is land and 8.25 square miles (21.37 km^{2}) is water. West Alton is located at the intersection of U.S. Route 67 and Missouri Route 94.

== Demographics ==
Historical population
Census	Pop.	Note	%±
2000	573		—
2010	522		−8.9%
2020	359		−31.2%
U.S. Decennial Census

=== 2010 census ===
As of the census of 2010, there were 522 people, 203 households, and 144 families living in the city. The population density was 18.1 inhabitants per square mile (7.0/km^{2}). There were 267 housing units at an average density of 9.3 per square mile (3.6/km^{2}). The racial makeup of the city was 98.7% White, 0.6% African American, 0.4% Native American, and 0.4% from two or more races. Hispanic or Latino of any race were 1.0% of the population.

There were 203 households, of which 32.5% had children under the age of 18 living with them, 49.8% were married couples living together, 13.3% had a female householder with no husband present, 7.9% had a male householder with no wife present, and 29.1% were non-families. 23.6% of all households were made up of individuals, and 6.4% had someone living alone who was 65 years of age or older. The average household size was 2.57 and the average family size was 2.97.

The median age in the city was 41.3 years. 21.6% of residents were under the age of 18; 8.9% were between the ages of 18 and 24; 23.5% were from 25 to 44; 32.9% were from 45 to 64; and 13.2% were 65 years of age or older. The gender makeup of the city was 52.5% male and 47.5% female.

=== 2000 census ===
As of the census of 2000, there were 573 people, 211 households, and 147 families living in the city. The population density was 20.2 people per square mile (7.8/km^{2}). There were 291 housing units at an average density of 10.3 per square mile (4.0/km^{2}). The racial makeup of the city was 99.13% White, 0.17% Native American, 0.17% Asian, 0.52% from other races. Hispanic or Latino of any race were 0.52% of the population.

There were 211 households, out of which 33.2% had children under the age of 18 living with them, 52.1% were married couples living together, 11.8% had a female householder with no husband present, and 29.9% were non-families. 25.1% of all households were made up of individuals, and 7.1% had someone living alone who was 65 years of age or older. The average household size was 2.72 and the average family size was 3.26.

In the city the population was spread out, with 28.1% under the age of 18, 8.6% from 18 to 24, 30.7% from 25 to 44, 22.9% from 45 to 64, and 9.8% who were 65 years of age or older. The median age was 37 years. For every 100 females, there were 119.5 males. For every 100 females age 18 and over, there were 114.6 males.

The median income for a household in the city was $36,094, and the median income for a family was $45,556. Males had a median income of $32,431 versus $27,143 for females. The per capita income for the city was $18,975. About 4.5% of families and 7.7% of the population were below the poverty line, including 8.8% of those under age 18 and 9.7% of those age 65 or over.

== Education ==
It is in the Orchard Farm R-V School District.
