= Sunset Hills, Missouri =

- City
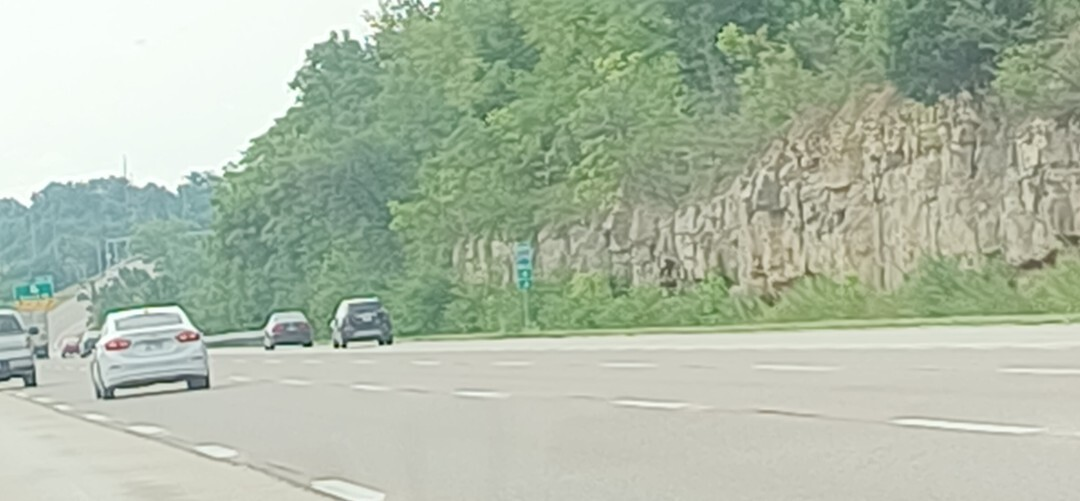

- Location of Sunset Hills, Missouri
- Coordinates: 38°31′52″N 90°24′31″W
- Country: United States
- State: Missouri
- County: St. Louis
- Incorporated: June 1957

Area
  - Total: 9.08 sq mi (23.53 km^{2})
  - Land: 8.98 sq mi (23.26 km^{2})
  - Water: 0.10 sq mi (0.27 km^{2})
- Elevation: 541 ft (165 m)

Population (2020)
  - Total: 9,198
  - Density: 1,024.3/sq mi (395.47/km^{2})
- Time zone: UTC-6 (Central (CST))
  - Summer (DST): UTC-5 (CDT)
- FIPS code: 29-71746
- GNIS feature ID: 2396007
- Website: sunset-hills.com

Sunset Hills is a city in south St. Louis County, Missouri, United States. As of the 2020 United States census, the city's population was 9,198.

== Geography ==
According to the United States Census Bureau, the city has a total area of 9.14 square miles (23.67 km^{2}), of which 9.10 square miles (23.57 km^{2}) is land and 0.04 square miles (0.10 km^{2}) is water.

== History ==
Sunset Hills was incorporated in June 1957. In April 1973, it established its own Police Department, and in 1981, it purchased a landscaping service in order to establish the city's public works department.

Around noon on December 31, 2010, an EF3 tornado struck Sunset Hills, destroying several businesses and homes, killing one person, and injuring others in a three- to four-block area around Lindbergh Boulevard.

== Demographics ==
Historical population
Census	Pop.	Note	%±
1960	3,525		—
1970	4,126		17.0%
1980	4,363		5.7%
1990	4,915		12.7%
2000	8,267		68.2%
2010	8,496		2.8%
2020	9,198		8.3%
U.S. Decennial Census

=== Racial and ethnic composition ===
Sunset Hills city, Missouri – Racial and ethnic composition Note: the US Census treats Hispanic/Latino as an ethnic category. This table excludes Latinos from the racial categories and assigns them to a separate category. Hispanics/Latinos may be of any race.
Race / Ethnicity (NH = Non-Hispanic)	Pop 2000	Pop 2010	Pop 2020	% 2000	% 2010	% 2020
White alone (NH)	7,913	7,909	8,223	95.72%	93.09%	89.40%
Black or African American alone (NH)	89	129	77	1.08%	1.52%	0.84%
Native American or Alaska Native alone (NH)	8	13	7	0.10%	0.15%	0.08%
Asian alone (NH)	118	198	278	1.43%	2.33%	3.02%
Native Hawaiian or Pacific Islander alone (NH)	0	0	0	0.00%	0.00%	0.00%
Other race alone (NH)	8	5	25	0.10%	0.06%	0.27%
Mixed race or Multiracial (NH)	58	103	357	0.70%	1.21%	3.88%
Hispanic or Latino (any race)	73	139	231	0.88%	1.64%	2.51%
Total	8,267	8,496	9,198	100.00%	100.00%	100.00%

=== 2020 census ===
As of the 2020 census, Sunset Hills had a population of 9,198. The population density was 1,024.3 inhabitants per square mile (395.5/km^{2}). The median age was 50.1 years. 21.4% of residents were under the age of 18 and 30.4% of residents were 65 years of age or older. For every 100 females there were 92.1 males, and for every 100 females age 18 and over there were 88.2 males age 18 and over.

100.0% of residents lived in urban areas, while 0.0% lived in rural areas.

There were 3,332 households in Sunset Hills, of which 28.5% had children under the age of 18 living in them. Of all households, 65.6% were married-couple households, 10.9% were households with a male householder and no spouse or partner present, and 20.0% were households with a female householder and no spouse or partner present. About 22.4% of all households were made up of individuals and 15.4% had someone living alone who was 65 years of age or older. The average household size was 2.4 and the average family size was 2.9.

There were 3,534 housing units, of which 5.7% were vacant. The homeowner vacancy rate was 1.2% and the rental vacancy rate was 8.7%.

=== Income and poverty ===
The 2016–2020 5-year American Community Survey estimates show that the median household income was $100,972 (with a margin of error of +/- $15,981) and the median family income was $127,061 (+/- $16,410). Males had a median income of $80,417 (+/- $15,262) versus $40,964 (+/- $3,054) for females. The median income for those above 16 years old was $52,798 (+/- $11,640). Approximately, 1.6% of families and 2.7% of the population were below the poverty line, including 3.1% of those under the age of 18 and 4.2% of those ages 65 or over.

=== 2010 census ===
As of the 2010 United States census of 2010, there were 8,496 people, 3,424 households, and 2,422 families living in the city. The population density was 933.6 inhabitants per square mile (360.5/km^{2}). There were 3,635 housing units at an average density of 399.5 per square mile (154.2/km^{2}). The racial makeup of the city was 94.1% White, 2.3% Asian, 1.5% African American, 0.2% Native American, 0.4% from other races, and 1.4% from two or more races. Hispanic or Latino of any race were 1.6% of the population.

There were 3,424 households, of which 26.3% had children under the age of 18 living with them, 62.6% were married couples living together, 5.4% had a female householder with no husband present, 2.7% had a male householder with no wife present, and 29.3% were non-families. 25.8% of all households were made up of individuals, and 18.1% had someone living alone who was 65 years of age or older. The average household size was 2.39 and the average family size was 2.89.

The median age in the city was 50.3 years. 20.7% of residents were under the age of 18; 5.4% were between the ages of 18 and 24; 15.8% were from 25 to 44; 31.6% were from 45 to 64; and 26.5% were 65 years of age or older. The gender makeup of the city was 47.5% male and 52.5% female.

=== 2000 census ===
As of the 2000 United States census, there were 8,267 people, 3,217 households, and 2,351 families living in the city. The population density was 915.3 inhabitants per square mile (353.4/km^{2}). There were 3,337 housing units at an average density of 369.5 per square mile (142.7/km^{2}). The racial makeup of the city was 96.27% White, 1.44% Asian, 1.08% African American, 0.13% Native American, 0.29% from other races, and 0.79% from two or more races. Hispanic or Latino of any race were 0.88% of the population.

There were 3,217 households, out of which 26.6% had children under the age of 18 living with them, 65.7% were married couples living together, 5.5% had a female householder with no husband present, and 26.9% were non-families. 24.2% of all households were made up of individuals, and 16.1% had someone living alone who was 65 years of age or older. The average household size was 2.46 and the average family size was 2.94.

In the city, the population was spread out, with 21.6% under the age of 18, 5.2% from 18 to 24, 19.8% from 25 to 44, 28.2% from 45 to 64, and 25.2% who were 65 years of age or older. The median age was 47 years. For every 100 females, there were 88.9 males. For every 100 females age 18 and over, there were 85.0 males.

The median income for a household in the city was $67,576, and the median income for a family was $90,417. Males had a median income of $60,869 versus $35,044 for females. The per capita income for the city was $40,151. About 2.0% of families and 3.1% of the population were below the poverty line, including 1.9% of those under age 18 and 5.0% of those age 65 or over.

=== 1990 census ===
As of the 1990 United States census, the city had 4,915 residents; due to a series of annexations during the 1990s, the population grew to 7,885 by 1997.

== Education ==
The Kirkwood School District and Lindbergh Schools school districts serve sections of the city. Their respective high schools are Kirkwood High School and Lindbergh High School.

Private schools include Thomas Jefferson School (St. Louis, Missouri), a boarding school for grades 7–12, and St. Justin the Martyr School, a Catholic school for kindergarten and grades 1–8.

Post-secondary colleges in Sunset Hills include Vatterott College.

== Politics ==
Sunset Hills is represented by the following state and U.S. congressional members:

- In the Missouri House of Representatives, Sunset Hills is part of District 96 and represented by Republican David Gregory;
- In the Missouri Senate, it is part of District 15 and represented by Republican Andrew Koenig;
- In the U.S. House of Representatives, Sunset Hills is part of Missouri's 2nd congressional district and is represented by Republican Ann Wagner, the former United States Ambassador to Luxembourg

== See also ==
- Laumeier Sculpture Park, located in Sunset Hills
