= List of crossings of the Missouri River =

The list of crossings of the Missouri River includes bridges over the Missouri River, which spans from the Mississippi River, upstream to its sources.

== Crossings ==
Crossing	Carries	Location	Coordinates
=== Missouri ===
Mouth of Missouri River			38°49′01″N 90°07′18″W
Lewis Bridge	US 67	Spanish Lake and West Alton	38°50′33″N 90°14′08″W
Bellefontaine Bridge	BNSF Railway Hannibal Subdivision	Spanish Lake and West Alton	38°50′37″N 90°14′11″W
Discovery Bridge	Route 370	Bridgeton and Saint Charles	38°47′53″N 90°28′01″W
Wabash Bridge	Norfolk Southern Railway St. Louis District (formerly Wabash Railroad)	Bridgeton and Saint Charles	38°47′51″N 90°28′02″W
Old St. Charles Bridge (demolished)	US 40; Route 115	Bridgeton and Saint Charles	38°47′00″N 90°28′36″W
Blanchette Memorial Bridge	I-70	Maryland Heights and Saint Charles	38°45′52″N 90°28′57″W
Veterans Memorial Bridge	Route 364	Maryland Heights and Saint Charles	38°44′11″N 90°31′19″W
Daniel Boone Bridge	I-64; US 40; US 61	Chesterfield and Weldon Spring	38°41′13″N 90°39′46″W
Washington Bridge (old bridge was replaced in 2018)	Route 47	Washington and Three Creeks	38°33′27″N 90°59′54″W
Christopher S. Bond Bridge	Route 19	Hermann and Loutre Township	38°42′34″N 91°26′20″W
Hermann Bridge (demolished)	Route 19	Hermann and Loutre Township	38°42′34″N 91°26′18″W
Senator Roy Blunt Bridge	US 54; US 63	Jefferson City	38°35′15″N 92°10′42″W
Rocheport Bridge	I-70	Saline Township and Katy Township	38°57′35″N 92°32′41″W
Boonslick Bridge	US 40; Route 5 Route 87	Boonville and Franklin Township	38°58′51″N 92°44′45″W
Missouri-Kansas-Texas (MKT) Bridge	abandoned, formerly Missouri–Kansas–Texas Railroad	Boonville and Franklin Township	38°58′45″N 92°45′16″W
Glasgow Bridge (old bridge was replaced in 2009)	Route 240	Cambridge Township and Glasgow	39°13′21″N 92°51′00″W
Glasgow Railroad Bridge	Kansas City Southern Railway Mexico Subdivision	Cambridge Township and Glasgow	39°13′22″N 92°51′03″W
Miami Bridge (Old bridge was replaced in 2010)	Route 41	Miami and Eugene Township	39°19′45″N 93°13′31″W
Waverly Bridge (old bridge was replaced in 2005)	US 24; US 65	Waverly and Sugartree Township	39°12′54″N 93°30′56″W
Ike Skelton Bridge	Route 13	Lexington Township and Crooked River Township	39°12′35″N 93°51′48″W
Lexington Bridge (demolished)		Lexington and Richmond Township	39°11′13″N 93°53′47″W
Sibley Railroad Bridge	BNSF Railway Marceline Subdivision	Fort Osage Township and Orrick Township	39°10′48″N 94°10′45″W
Liberty Bend Bridge	Route 291	Sugar Creek and River Bend	39°10′06″N 94°23′43″W
Harry S. Truman Bridge	Union Pacific Trenton Subdivision; Canadian Pacific Kansas City Subdivision	Kansas City	39°08′41″N 94°29′05″W
Eastern I-435 Bridge	I-435	Kansas City and Randolph	39°09′04″N 94°29′54″W
Chouteau Bridge	Route 269	Kansas City and North Kansas City	39°08′42″N 94°32′03″W
Christopher S. Bond Bridge	I-29; I-35; US 71	Kansas City and North Kansas City	39°07′21″N 94°33′59″W
Paseo Bridge (Demolished)	I-29; I-35; US 71	Kansas City and North Kansas City	39°07′22″N 94°33′58″W
Heart of America Bridge	Route 9	Kansas City and North Kansas City	39°06′59″N 94°34′47″W
ASB Bridge	BNSF Railway	Kansas City and North Kansas City	39°07′02″N 94°34′44″W
Hannibal Bridge (demolished)	Hannibal & St. Joseph Railroad; BNSF Railway	Kansas City and North Kansas City	39°06′46″N 94°35′20″W
Second Hannibal Bridge	BNSF Railway St. Joseph Subdivision	Kansas City and North Kansas City	39°06′46″N 94°35′20″W
New Buck O'Neil Bridge	US 169	Kansas City and North Kansas City	
Old Buck O'Neil Bridge / Broadway Bridge (demolished)	US 169	Kansas City and North Kansas City	39°06′43″N 94°35′22″W
=== Kansas–Missouri ===
US 69 Missouri River Bridge	US 69	Kansas City and Riverside	39°09′23″N 94°37′24″W
Fairfax and Platte Purchase Bridges (demolished)	US 69	Kansas City and Riverside	39°09′23″N 94°37′23″W
Fairfax and Platte Purchase Bridges (demolished)	US 69	Kansas City and Riverside	39°09′23″N 94°37′24″W
I-635 Bridge	I-635	Kansas City and Riverside	39°09′14″N 94°39′03″W
Western I-435 Bridge	I-435	Kansas City and Parkville	39°11′31″N 94°46′13″W
Terminal Bridge (demolished)	railway	Leavenworth and Lee Township	39°19′02″N 94°54′24″W
Centennial Bridge	K-92 / Route 92	Leavenworth and Lee Township	39°19′47″N 94°54′32″W
Kansas and Missouri Bridge (demolished)	K-92 / Route 92	Leavenworth and Lee Township	39°20′59″N 94°54′38″W
Amelia Earhart Bridge	US 59	Atchison and Rush Township	39°33′35″N 95°06′48″W
Atchison Rail Bridge	BNSF Railway	Atchison and Rush Township	39°33′37″N 95°06′47″W
Pony Express Bridge	US 36	Elwood and St. Joseph	39°44′56″N 94°51′34″W
St. Joseph Swing Bridge	Union Pacific	Elwood and St. Joseph	39°44′57″N 94°51′34″W
=== Nebraska–Missouri ===
Rulo Bridge (Old Bridge was replaced in 2013)	US 159	Rulo and Minton Township	40°03′15″N 95°25′15″W
Rulo Rail Bridge	BNSF Railway St. Joseph Subdivision	Rulo and Minton Township	40°03′16″N 95°25′15″W
Brownville Bridge	US 136	Brownville and Templeton Township	40°23′57″N 95°39′06″W
=== Nebraska–Iowa ===
Nebraska City Bridge	N-2 / Iowa 2	Nebraska City and Benton Township	40°40′14″N 95°49′51″W
Railroad bridge (demolished)		Nebraska City and Benton Township	
Waubonsie Bridge (demolished)		Nebraska City and Benton Township	
Pontoon bridge (demolished)		Nebraska City and Benton Township	
Plattsmouth Bridge	Livingston Road/Lambert Avenue (formerly US 34)	Plattsmouth and Plattville Township	41°00′03″N 95°52′01″W
Plattsmouth Rail Bridge	BNSF Railway Creston Subdivision (formerly Burlington and Missouri River Railroad)	Plattsmouth and Plattville Township	41°00′06″N 95°52′02″W
Plattsmouth Pipeline Bridge		Plattsmouth and Plattville Township	41°00′10″N 95°52′06″W
U.S. Route 34 Missouri River Bridge	US 34	LaPlatte I Precinct and Plattville Township	
Bellevue Bridge	Mission Avenue (formerly N-370 / Iowa 370)	Bellevue and St. Marys Township	41°08′19″N 95°52′46″W
South Omaha Veterans Memorial Bridge (Old bridge was replaced in 2010)	US 275; N-92 / Iowa 92	Omaha and Council Bluffs	41°12′40″N 95°55′35″W
Interstate 80 Missouri River Bridge	I-80	Omaha and Council Bluffs	41°13′54″N 95°54′39″W
Union Pacific Missouri River Bridge	Union Pacific Railroad Omaha Subdivision	Omaha and Council Bluffs	41°14′59″N 95°55′02″W
Ak-Sar-Ben Bridge (demolished)		Omaha and Council Bluffs	41°15′32″N 95°55′17″W
Grenville Dodge Memorial Bridge	I-480 (Gerald R. Ford Freeway) US 6	Omaha and Council Bluffs	41°15′35″N 95°55′18″W
Bob Kerrey Pedestrian Bridge		Omaha and Council Bluffs	41°15′17″N 95°55′31″W
Illinois Central Missouri River Bridge	abandoned	Omaha and Council Bluffs	41°16′41″N 95°53′28″W
Mormon Bridge	I-680	Omaha and Crescent Township	41°20′44″N 95°57′26″W
Blair Bridge (Abraham Lincoln Memorial Bridge)	US 30	Blair and Cincinnati Township	41°33′04″N 96°05′44″W
Blair Bridge	Union Pacific Railroad Blair Subdivision	Blair and Cincinnati Township	41°33′05″N 96°05′44″W
Burt County Missouri River Bridge	N-51 / Iowa 175	Decatur and Lincoln Township	42°00′24″N 96°14′31″W
Sergeant Floyd Memorial Bridge	I-129; US 20; US 75	South Sioux City and Sioux City	42°26′49″N 96°22′48″W
Sioux City Rail Bridge	BNSF Railway Sioux City Subdivision	South Sioux City and Sioux City	42°28′29″N 96°23′07″W
Siouxland Veterans Memorial Bridge	US 77	South Sioux City and Sioux City	42°29′15″N 96°24′49″W
=== Nebraska–South Dakota ===
Vermillion-Newcastle Bridge	N-15 / SD 19	Hooker Township and Vermillion Township	42°43′08″N 96°57′06″W
Meridian Highway Bridge	pedestrians (formerly US 81)	South Yankton and Yankton	42°51′53″N 97°23′38″W
Discovery Bridge	US 81	South Yankton and Yankton	42°51′56″N 97°23′49″W
Gavins Point Dam	Crest Road	Cedar County Precinct 2 and West Yankton	42°51′45″N 97°29′06″W
Chief Standing Bear Memorial Bridge	N-14 / SD 37	Niobrara Township and Running Water	42°46′00″N 97°59′15″W
=== South Dakota ===
Fort Randall Dam	US 18; US 281	Southeast Gregory County and White Swan Township, near Pickstown	43°04′01″N 98°33′10″W
Platte–Winner Bridge	SD 44	North Gregory County and La Roche Township	43°23′12″N 99°07′56″W
Chamberlain Rail Bridge	Ringneck and Western Railroad (formerly Dakota Southern Railway)	Oacoma and Chamberlain Township	43°47′56″N 99°21′33″W
Lewis and Clark Memorial Bridge	I-90	Oacoma and Chamberlain	43°48′06″N 99°21′12″W
Chamberlain Bridge	I-90 BL (formerly US 16)	Oacoma and Chamberlain	43°48′48″N 99°20′33″W
Big Bend Dam	SD 47	Lower Brule and Fort Thompson	44°02′53″N 99°26′53″W
John C. Waldron Memorial Bridge	US 14; US 83; SD 34	Fort Pierre and Pierre	44°22′15″N 100°22′10″W
Chicago and North Western Railroad Bridge	Rapid City, Pierre and Eastern Railroad	Fort Pierre and Pierre	44°22′25″N 100°22′10″W
Oahe Dam	SD 1804	North Stanley County and West Hughes County, near Oahe Acres	44°27′00″N 100°24′13″W
U.S. Route 212 Missouri River Bridge	US 212	South Dewey County near Swift Bird, and Forest City	45°01′04″N 100°17′41″W
U.S. Route 12 Missouri River Bridge	US 12; SD 20	East Corson County and West Walworth County, near Mobridge	45°33′55″N 100°28′08″W
Mobridge Rail Bridge	BNSF Railway Mobridge Subdivision	East Corson County and West Walworth County, near Mobridge	45°34′10″N 100°27′33″W
=== North Dakota ===
Bismarck Expressway Bridge	ND 810 (Bismarck Expressway)	Mandan and Bismarck	46°47′47″N 100°49′12″W
New Liberty Memorial Bridge (Open; Under Construction)	I-94 BL	Mandan and Bismarck	46°48′28″N 100°49′09″W
Liberty Memorial Bridge (demolished October 29, 2008)	I-94 BL	Mandan and Bismarck	46°48′29″N 100°49′10″W
Bismarck Rail Bridge	BNSF Railway Jamestown Subdivision	Mandan and Bismarck	46°49′05″N 100°49′37″W
Grant Marsh Bridge	I-94	Mandan and Bismarck	46°49′24″N 100°49′49″W
Washburn Bridge	ND 200A	East Oliver County and Washburn	47°17′19″N 101°02′33″W
Garrison Dam	ND 200	Pick City and Riverdale	47°29′53″N 101°24′38″W
Four Bears Bridge	ND 23	Four Bears Village and New Town	47°58′46″N 102°33′42″W
Williston Bridge	US 85	Judson Township near Williston, and Tri Township	48°06′31″N 103°43′00″W
Buford Bridge	ND 58	Yellowstone Township and Buford	47°59′02″N 104°00′56″W
=== Montana ===
source			
Burlington Northern Rail Bridge (also known as Snowden Bridge, Nohly Bridge, and Great Northern Railroad Bridge)	BNSF Railway, originally Great Northern Railway (U.S.)	Nohly	48°00′00″N 104°05′45″W
Culbertson Bridge	MT 16	Culbertson	48°07′29″N 104°28′29″W
Highway Bridge	Roosevelt Co. Rd. 480	South of Sprole	48°03′53″N 105°01′55″W
Lewis and Clark Bridge	MT 13	East of Wolf Point	48°03′54″N 105°01′54″W
Fort Peck Dam	MT 24	17 miles southeast of Glasgow	48°00′13″N 106°24′41″W
Highway Bridge	US 191	72 miles south of Malta	47°37′52″N 108°41′04″W
McClelland Ferry	Blaine Co. Rd. Road 300 / Fergus Co. Rd. 101	12 miles north of Winifred	47°44′15″N 109°23′29″W
Highway Bridge	S-236	64 miles southeast of Big Sandy	47°44′20″N 109°37′33″W
Virgelle Ferry	Chouteau Co. Rd. 430	Virgelle	48°00′04″N 110°15′14″W
Loma Bridge	Chouteau Co. Rd. 303	Loma	47°55′17″N 110°29′43″W
Ft. Benton Old Bridge	Pedestrian Bridge	Ft. Benton	47°49′02″N 110°39′58″W
Chouteau County Memorial Bridge	MT 80	Ft. Benton	47°48′54″N 110°40′02″W
Carter Ferry	Chouteau Co. Rd. 100	5 miles southeast of Carter	47°45′37″N 110°53′46″W
Moroney Dam		15 miles northeast of Great Falls	47°34′53″N 111°03′36″W
Ryan Dam		12 miles northeast of Great Falls	47°34′11″N 111°07′29″W
Cochrane Dam		10 miles northeast of Great Falls	47°33′12″N 111°08′57″W
Rainbow Dam		8 miles east of Great Falls	47°32′05″N 111°12′17″W
Rail Bridge	BNSF Railway	Just above Rainbow Dam	47°32′06″N 111°12′18″W
Black Eagle Dam		Just north of Great Falls	47°31′11″N 111°15′49″W
15th Street Bridge	US 87	Great Falls	47°31′14″N 111°16′54″W
Historic 10th Street Bridge	Pedestrian Bridge	Great Falls	47°31′14″N 111°17′26″W
9th Street Bridge		Great Falls	47°31′14″N 111°17′28″W
Central Avenue Bridge		Great Falls	47°30′26″N 111°18′46″W
Railroad Bridge	BNSF Railway	Great Falls	47°30′9″N 111°18′43″W
Interstate Bridge	I-315; US 89; MT 3 MT 200	Great Falls	47°29′36″N 111°18′48″W
Highway Bridge	S-330	Ulm	47°25′49″N 111°30′09″W
Highway Bridge	S-330	Cascade	47°16′11″N 111°41′46″W
Freeway Bridge	I-15	1 mile south of Hardy	47°10′40″N 111°48′45″W
Hardy Bridge	Former US 91	2.5 miles south of Hardy	47°10′02″N 111°50′05″W
Freeway Bridge	I-15	2 miles north of Dearborn Exit	47°08′19″N 111°51′40″W
Freeway Bridges	I-15	3/4 miles north of Dearborn Exit	47°07′54″N 111°52′28″W
Freeway Bridges	I-15	1/4 mile north of Dearborn Exit	47°07′58″N 111°53′11″W
Freeway Bridge	I-15	1½ miles south of Dearborn Exit, at mouth of Dearborn River	47°07′41″N 111°54′41″W
Freeway Bridge	I-15	2½ miles north of Craig	47°06′02″N 111°56′58″W
Highway Bridge	Lewis and Clark Co. Rd. 13 B	Craig	47°04′28″N 111°57′41″W
Missouri River Bridge	Craig Frontage Road; Possibly former US 91	3½ miles northeast of Wolf Creek	47°01′08″N 112°00′44″W
Holter Dam		4 miles southeast of Wolf Creek; Holter Lake; Gates of the Mountains Wilderness	46°59′28″N 112°00′17″W
Hauser Dam		6 miles north of the east end of S-453	46°45′54″N 111°53′13″W
Trout Creek Canyon Bridge	York Road / S-280	15 miles northeast of Helena	46°42′48″N 111°48′23″W
Canyon Ferry Dam	S-284	19 miles east of Helena	46°38′55″N 111°43′41″W
Highway Bridge	US 12; US 287	1 mile north of Townsend	46°20′07″N 111°31′54″W
Railroad Bridge	Montana RailLink	1 mile north of Townsend	46°20′05″N 111°31′58″W
Highway Bridge	US 287	1/2 mile north of Toston	46°10′27″N 111°26′45″W
Toston Bridge	Broadwater Co. Rd. 415C (formerly US 287)	Toston	46°10′19″N 111°26′38″W
Toston Dam		8 miles south of Toston	46°07′12″N 111°24′30″W
Abandoned Rail Bridge	Old Milwaukee Road Line	At mouth of Sixteen Mile Creek	46°06′21″N 111°24′01″W
Mouth of Gallatin River			45°56′19″N 111°29′35″W
Confluence of the Jefferson and the Madison Rivers Beginning of the Missouri River			45°55′36″N 111°30′18″W

== See also ==
- List of crossings of the Upper Mississippi River
- List of crossings of the Lower Mississippi River
