= U.S. Route 69 Missouri River Bridge =

Bridge over the Missouri River

US 69 Missouri River Bridge
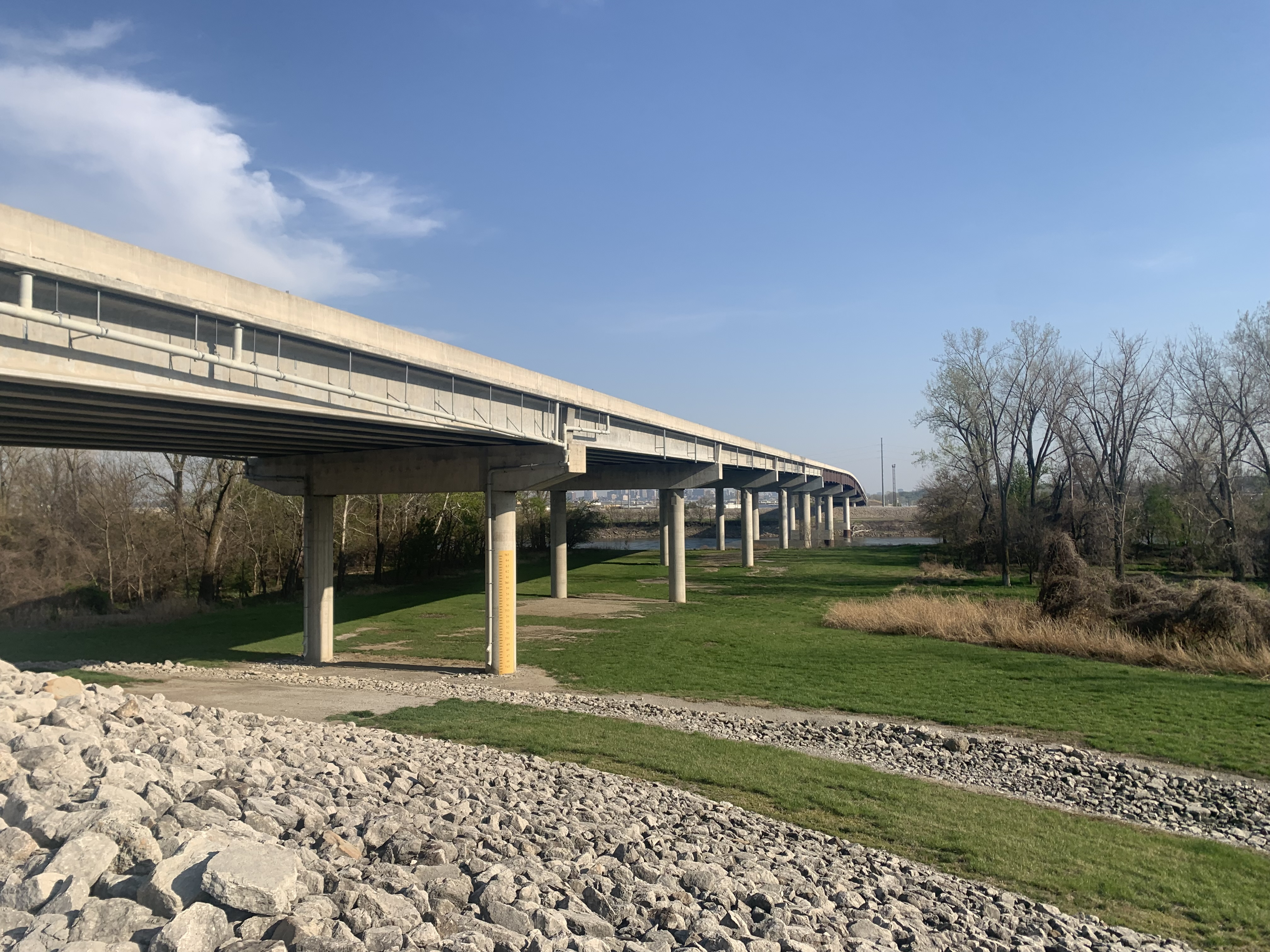
- Coordinates: 39.1566°N 94.6236°W
- Carries: US 69, bicycles, pedestrians
- Crosses: Missouri River
- Locale: Riverside, Missouri to Kansas City, Kansas
- Maintained by: Missouri Department of Transportation
- Preceded by: Interstate 635 Bridge
- Followed by: Buck O'Neil Bridge

Characteristics
- Design: Girder bridge

History
- Construction cost: $79 million
- Opened: October 2016
- Inaugurated: March 16, 2017

Location
- Interactive map of US 69 Missouri River Bridge

The US 69 Missouri River Bridge is a girder bridge carrying U.S. Route 69 (US 69) over the Missouri River. It connects Interstate 635 (I-635) in Riverside, Missouri with the 7th Street Trafficway and Fairfax District in Kansas City, Kansas. In addition to automobiles, the bridge also carries bicycle and pedestrian traffic.

The bridge replaced the now-demolished Fairfax and Platte Purchase bridges. Construction began in the fall of 2014. The bridge opened to automobile traffic in October 2016 and was formally opened to all traffic on March 16, 2017. The bridge was constructed by the Missouri Department of Transportation at cost of $79 million (equivalent to $106 million in 2025). Construction costs were split with the Kansas Department of Transportation.

== See also ==
- List of crossings of the Missouri River
