= Ike Skelton Bridge =

Bridge in Missouri, U.S.

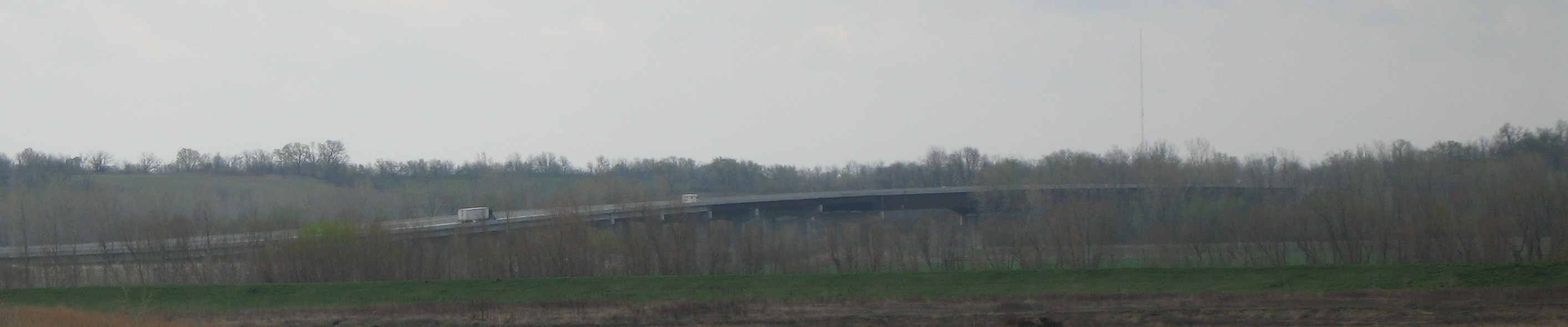
- Ike Skelton Bridge from northeast
- Coordinates: 39°12′35″N 93°51′49″W
- Carries: Route 13
- Crosses: Missouri River
- Locale: Lexington, Missouri
- Named for: Ike Skelton

Characteristics
- Total length: 3/4 mile (1.2 km)
- Width: 78 feet (24 m)

History
- Construction cost: $50 million
- Opened: June 25, 2005

Location
- Interactive map of Ike Skelton Bridge

The Ike Skelton Bridge is a set of girder bridges on Route 13 over the Missouri River at Lexington, Missouri between Ray County and Lafayette County.

It opened on June 25, 2005. It is named for Lexington native, Congressman Ike Skelton. Senate Bill 233 in Missouri also named the new Christopher S. Bond Bridge in Hermann, Missouri over the river as well as section of Interstate 44 in Phelps County for former Governor Mel Carnahan.

The bridge is two miles east of the former Lexington Bridge. It is 3/4 mile (1.2 km) long and 78 feet (24 m) wide. Its design includes two 12-foot lanes in each direction and two 10-foot outside shoulders and two 4-foot inside shoulders. It cost $50 million.

== See also ==
- List of crossings of the Missouri River
