= Miami Bridge =

- Coordinates: 39°19′45″N 93°13′31″W
- Carries: Route 41
- Crosses: Missouri River
- Locale: Miami, Missouri
- Other name(s): McDaniel Memorial Bridge
- Named for: Miami, Missouri

Characteristics
- Material: Concrete girder
- Total length: 1304.7 feet
- Width: 23.0 feet
- Longest span: 474.7 feet
- No. of spans: 11
- Clearance below: 16.5 feet

History
- Engineering design by: Sverdrup and Parcel
- Constructed by: Massman Construction Company
- Construction end: 1939
- Closed: October 5, 2009
- Replaces: Cantilever through truss bridge

The Miami Bridge, also known as the McDaniel Memorial Bridge, is a new concrete girder bridge that carries Missouri Route 41 over the Missouri River between Miami and Eugene Township, Missouri.

== Original bridge ==
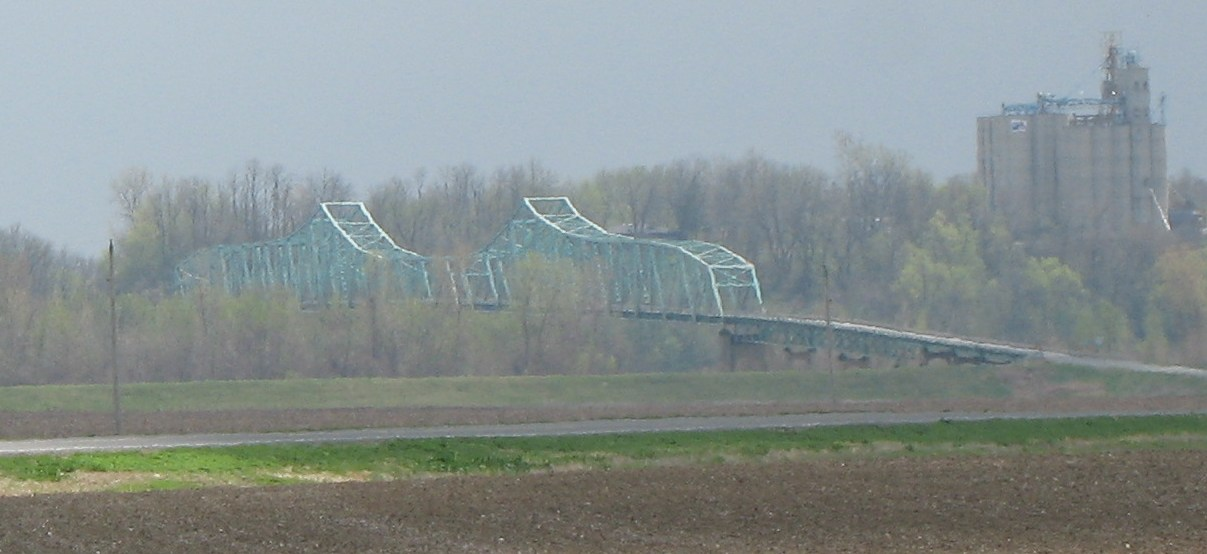
Old Miami Bridge from the north in 2007

The original Miami Bridge was a cantilever through truss bridge built in 1939, and its deck was replaced in 1983 as part of a rehabilitation project. The old bridge's main cantilever span was 474.7 feet, while the two anchor spans were each 415 feet in length, resulting in a total cantilever truss length of 1304.7 feet. There were 11 approach spans, including four Warren deck truss spans, three on the northern approach and one on the southern approach. All remaining approach spans were steel stringer (multi-beam/girder) spans. Total bridge length including approach spans is 2,071.9 feet. The bridge's deck width is 23.0 feet and it has vertical clearance of 16.5 feet.

The bridge was constructed with the assistance of the Federal Administration of Public Works also known as the Public Works Administration. Sverdrup and Parcel were consulting engineers for the structure, and Massman Construction Company was the contractor. The original plans for the bridge show plans for the original wooden toll building that was once located on the bridge. According to the plans, the toll building was painted white, featured wooden Slow and Stop signs, and included a cast iron stove for heating.

According to Clayton B. Fraser who conducted Missouri's 1992 Historic Bridge Inventory, the Miami Bridge was eligible for the National Register of Historic Places as an "outstanding, large-scale example of steel truss construction, located on important great river crossing."

== Current bridge ==
Despite its historic significance, Missouri Department of Transportation decided against rehabilitating the bridge and instead has decided to demolish the bridge's superstructure and erect a new bridge using the piers and abutment of the old bridge. The project will begin with the bridge's closure, scheduled for October 5, 2009.

== See also ==
- List of crossings of the Missouri River
