= Wabash Bridge (St. Charles, Missouri) =

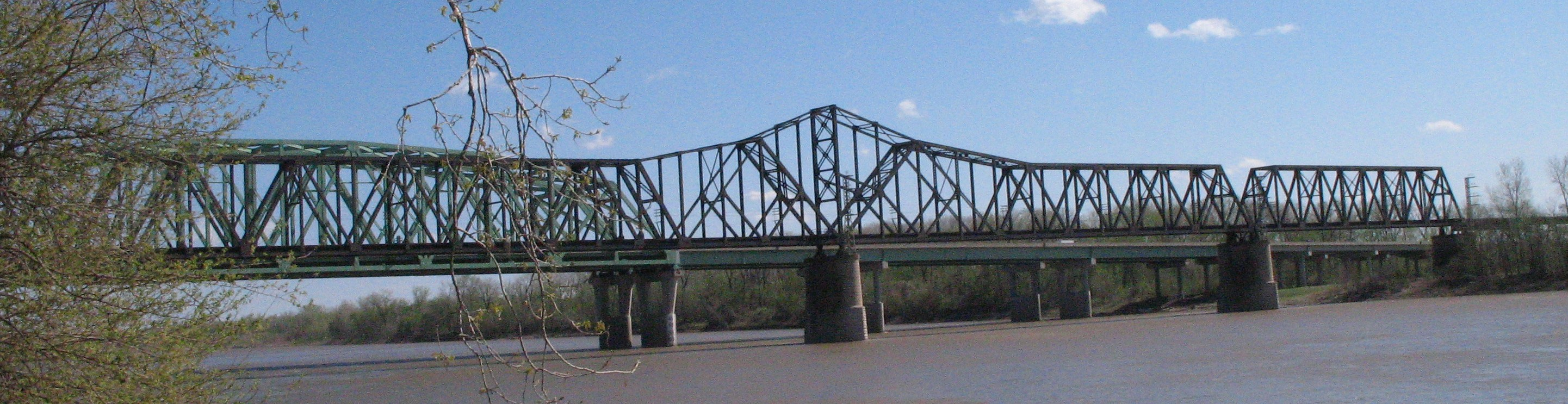
- Coordinates: 38.7974°N 90.4673°W
- Carries: Norfolk Southern Railway
- Crosses: Missouri River
- Locale: St. Louis County and St. Charles County in Missouri

Characteristics
- Design: Cantilevered Through Truss Bridge

History
- Opened: 1936

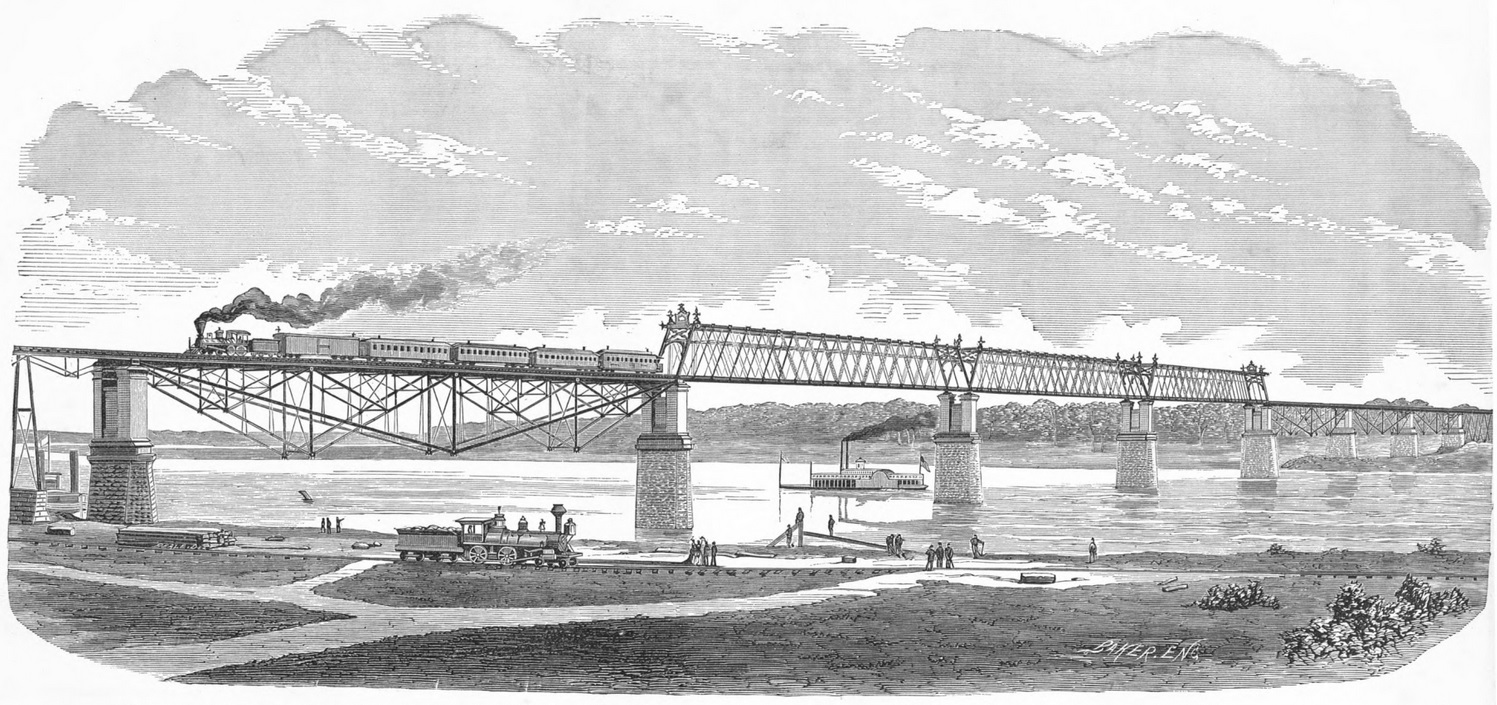
The first Wabash Bridge 1871

The Wabash Bridge carries a single track railroad from St. Louis County to the city of St. Charles. It is positioned next to the Discovery Bridge. It is used by the freight trains of Norfolk Southern Railway.

== History ==
The original St. Charles Bridge, built in 1871 to carry the North Missouri Railroad, was the first bridge in St. Charles County. The bridge saw multiple incidents during its lifetime. In 1870, a steel column collapsed during construction resulting in the deaths of eighteen bridge workers. In 1879, a portion of the bridge collapsed during a train crossing. Eighteen train cars fell into the river resulting in five deaths. At 5:30pm on December 8, 1881, the bridge failed again during a train crossing resulting in freight cars falling into the river. An engineer, John Kirksby of Moberly, Missouri, died along with thirty-one cattle contained in the freight cars. In 1884, the Montana steamboat collided with the pier of the bridge. The steamboat could not be removed and was left in the river. It lies on the St. Louis County side of the Missouri River near the site of the first Wabash Bridge and can still be seen when the river is low.

In 1936, the current Wabash Bridge was built about half a mile downstream from the old bridge, and the old bridge was demolished. In June 2013, the Missouri River rose rapidly overnight causing a crane mounted to a barge to collide into the truss structure of the bridge. The crane, subcontracted by The Walsh Group was working up river on the new I-70 Blanchette Memorial Bridge. Train traffic across the bridge was halted for the four days while the crane was against the structure. In 2016, owner operator Norfolk Southern Corporation began installing a new tie deck across the bridge with a completion date of 2020.

== See also ==
- List of crossings of the Missouri River
- Montana (steamboat)

== Sources ==
- Waymarking - A scavenger hunt for unique and interesting locations in the world
- Historic Bridges of the United States | St. Charles County, Missouri
