= Lexington Township =

Lexington Township may refer to:

- Lexington Township, McLean County, Illinois
- Lexington Township, Scott County, Indiana
- Lexington Township, Clark County, Kansas
- Lexington Township, Johnson County, Kansas
- Lexington Township, Michigan
- Lexington Township, Le Sueur County, Minnesota
- Lexington Township, Lafayette County, Missouri
- Lexington Township, Davidson, North Carolina, in Davidson, North Carolina
- Lexington Township, Stark County, Ohio
