= Christopher S. Bond Bridge =

Christopher S. Bond Bridge may refer to:

- Christopher S. Bond Bridge (Hermann, Missouri)
- Christopher S. Bond Bridge (Kansas City, Missouri)
