= Discovery Bridge =

Discovery Bridge may refer to:

- Discovery Bridge (Columbus, Ohio), connecting downtown Columbus and Franklinton
- Discovery Bridge (Missouri), connecting Saint Louis County with Saint Charles County, Missouri
- Discovery Bridge (Yankton), completed in 2008 across the Missouri River, connecting Nebraska with Yankton, South Dakota
