= Montana (steamboat) =

Coordinates: 38°47′41″N 90°28′1″W

- Montana in high water by the original railway bridge at St. Charles, Missouri, about 1880, the small steamboat Penguin is in the foreground

History
- Route: Pittsburgh – Fort Benton, MT; Pittsburgh – New Orleans (winter months)
- Builder: (California, PA, and Pittsburgh)
- Completed: 1879
- In service: 1879–1884
- Fate: Sank in June 1884 after hitting a pier of the St. Charles railway bridge

General characteristics
- Type: Packet steamboat
- Tonnage: 959 tons
- Length: 250 ft (76 m) between perpendiculars
- Beam: 48 ft 10 in (14.88 m)
- Depth: 5 ft 6 in (1.68 m)
- Installed power: 2 × high pressure steam engines
- Propulsion: Sternwheel
- Capacity: Passengers (unknown number); 1,200 tons freight

Montana was a Missouri River stern-wheel steamboat, one of three "mega-steamboats" (along with its sister boats the Wyoming and the Dakota) built in 1879 at the end of the steamboat era on the Missouri—when steamboats were soon to be supplanted by the nation's expanding railroad network. It was 250 feet (76 m) long (excluding the paddle wheel) and 48.8 feet (14.9 m) wide with a registered tonnage of 959 tons. For a while the Montana's size allowed it to compete with the railroads, but the railroads continued to close the gap. On June 22, 1884, the Montana met its fate near Bridgeton, Missouri, when it collided with the Wabash Bridge and/or a submerged tree branch (a snag) by various accounts. To allow its cargo to be unloaded, it was beached on the Bridgeton side of the river, where in the following years its rotting hulk was repeatedly buried and uncovered as the banks of the river shifted.

In the winter of 2001–2002, unusually low water levels in the Missouri exposed the remains of the Montana for the first time since the mid-1960s, and the State Historic Preservation Office of the Missouri Department of Natural Resources contracted SCI Engineering, Inc., of nearby St. Charles to monitor and photographically document the remains. The following autumn, at the invitation of Dr. Steve J. Dasovich, head of SCI's Archaeological Services Division, members of East Carolina University's Maritime History Program conducted an excavation and investigation of the wreckage. In 2012, low waters once again exposed the wreckage, and it was the subject of news reports. In these reports, Dr. Dasovich is quoted attributing the wreck to the boat's striking a submerged tree rather than its striking a bridge.

The Montana was the subject of the History Channel's Deep Sea Detectives episode "Skeleton in the Sand: The Montana" in September 2003 and was featured in the Wild West Tech episode "Biggest Machines in the West" in December 2004.
