= Missouri Route 370 =

State highway in Missouri, U.S.

Route 370
- Patrick J. Bray Memorial Highway (St. Charles County); Officer Scott H. Armstrong Memorial Highway (St. Louis County)
- Route 370 highlighted in red

Route information
- Maintained by MoDOT
- Length: 12.957 mi (20.852 km)
- Existed: 1993–present

Major junctions
- West end: I-70 in St. Peters
- Route 94 in St. Charles; Route 141 in Bridgeton
- East end: I-270 in Bridgeton

Location
- Country: United States
- State: Missouri
- Counties: St. Charles, St. Louis

Highway system
- Missouri State Highway System; Interstate; US; State; Supplemental
← Route 367	→ Route 371

Missouri Route 370 (Route 370) is a freeway that connects St. Louis County with St. Charles County via the Discovery Bridge over the Missouri River. The St. Charles County segment of the freeway is signed as the Patrick J. Bray Memorial Highway while in St. Louis County it is signed as the Officer Scott H. Armstrong Memorial Highway.

== Route description ==
Route 370 begins in St. Peters at a Y-interchange at I-70 exit 224 east of Mid Rivers Mall Drive and proceeds northeast. It loops around Fountain Lakes Park and crosses Cole Creek before turning to a southeasterly direction. It then passes north of St. Charles and interchanges with Route 94 at exit 7 before crossing the Missouri River. It then forms a Parclo interchange as it interchanges with Route 141 at exit 9 north of Earth City as it continues east. The route ends in Bridgeton, forming another Y-interchange at exits 22A and 22B on I-270 west of Missouri Bottom Road.

== History ==
Construction on Route 370 began in the early 1990s. It was built to replace the section of St. Charles Rock Road, then designated as Route 115, west of I-270.

MoDOT applied for an interstate highway designation of Interstate 370, but AASHTO rejected this in favor of the designation of Interstate 870. MoDOT did not want this because I-870 was their intended designation for what is now Interstate 255.

On December 16, 1992, the first section of the highway opened allowing direct access to St. Charles at Route 94 from I-270. It replaced the crumbling Old St. Charles Bridge that carried Route 115 traffic. On April 1, 1993, the road was designated as Route 370. In 1993, the Great Flood of 1993 surrounded much of the highway which is built on top of an embankment. As the flood waters surrounded the highway, many of the new exits had been shut down because the roads it connected to were underwater. Despite the flood, construction resumed on the highway until it was completed in 1996.

== Exit list ==
County	Location	mi	km	Exit	Destinations	Notes
St. Charles	St. Peters	0.000– 0.615	0.000– 0.990	1	I-70 – St. Louis, Kansas City	Western terminus; signed as exits 1A (east) and 1B (west)
St. Charles	St. Peters	1.277– 1.573	2.055– 2.531	1C	Salt River Road	Westbound exit and eastbound entrance
St. Charles	St. Peters	2.687	4.324	2	Truman Boulevard / Lakeside Park Drive	
St. Charles	St. Charles	5.110	8.224	5	Elm Street / New Town Boulevard	
St. Charles	St. Charles	7.882	12.685	7	Route 94 / Lewis and Clark Trail (North 3rd Street)	
Missouri River		8.454	13.605	Discovery Bridge		
St. Louis	Bridgeton	9.363	15.068	9	Route 141 south (Earth City Expressway)	Northern terminus of Route 141
St. Louis	Bridgeton	11.632	18.720	11	St. Louis Mills Boulevard	
St. Louis	Bridgeton	12.343	19.864	12A	I-270 north – Chicago, IL	Eastbound exit and westbound entrance
St. Louis	Bridgeton	12.596	20.271	12B	Missouri Bottom Road	Eastbound exit and westbound entrance
St. Louis	Bridgeton	12.957	20.852	12C	I-270 south – Memphis, TN	Eastern terminus
1.000 mi = 1.609 km; 1.000 km = 0.621 mi: Incomplete access
