= Hermann Bridge =

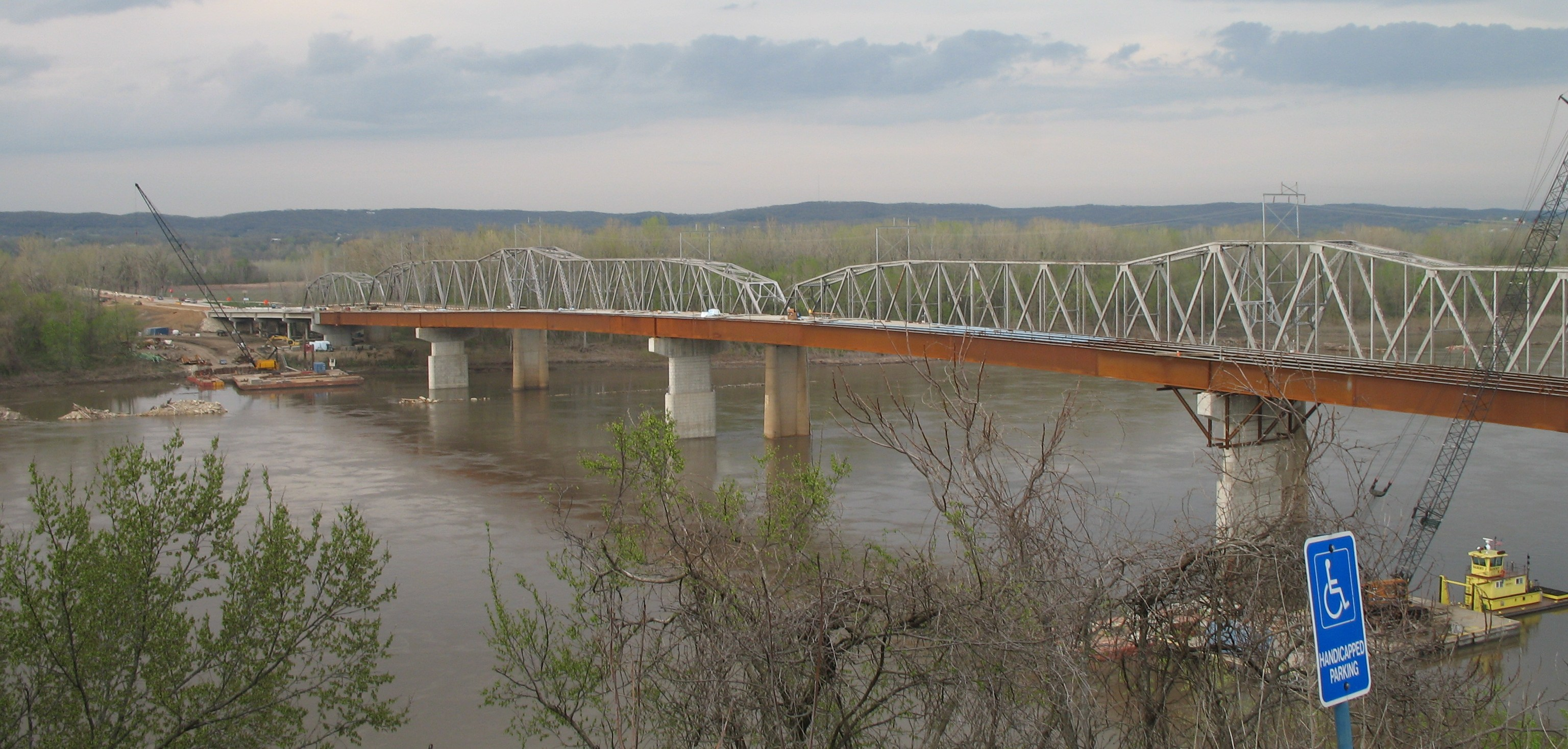
- Hermann Bridge, behind the new Bond Bridge, from the southwest bank in March 2007
- Coordinates: 38°42′35″N 91°26′18″W
- Carries: Route 19
- Crosses: Missouri River
- Locale: Hermann, Missouri

Characteristics
- Total length: 2,231.3 feet (680.1 m)
- Width: 20 feet (6.1 m)
- Longest span: 401.4 feet (122.3 m)

History
- Opened: August 29, 1930; 94 years ago
- Closed: July 23, 2007; 17 years ago

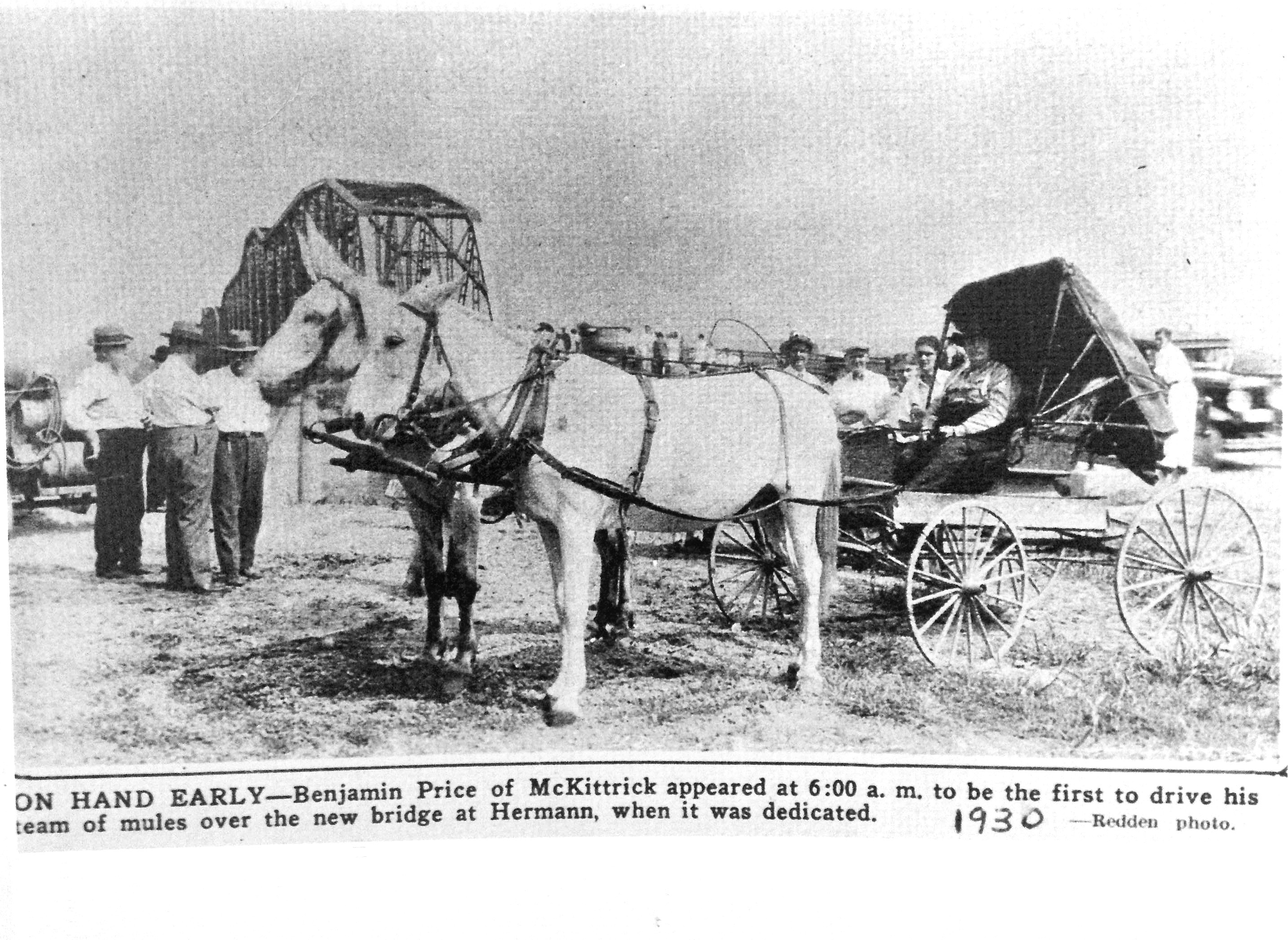
ON HAND EARLY - Benjamin Price of McKittrick appeared at 6:00 a.m. to be the first to drive his team of mules over the new bridge at Hermann, when it was dedicated. - Redden photo

The Hermann Bridge was a cantilevered truss bridge over the Missouri River at Hermann, Missouri, between Gasconade County, Missouri, and Montgomery County, Missouri. The bridge formerly carried Route 19 traffic and was closed on July 23, 2007, when the Christopher S. Bond Bridge was opened to traffic.

The bridge was built in 1930. Its main span was 401.4 feet (122.3 m) and it had a total length of 2,231.3 feet (680.1 m) and a deck width of 20 feet (6.1 m). Its vertical clearance was 15 feet (4.6 m). It carried one lane of automobile traffic in each direction.

Immediately after closing of the bridge, demolition began on the portion of the southern end crossing the Union Pacific Railroad tracks to allow completion of the new Bond bridge. Demolition was completed in June 2008 with removal of the last pier.

== See also ==
- List of bridges documented by the Historic American Engineering Record in Missouri
- List of crossings of the Missouri River
