= Joseph Tomlinson (civil engineer) =

English-American engineer (1816–1905)

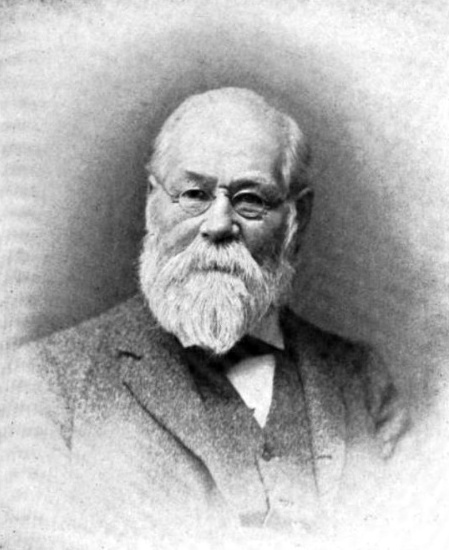
- Joseph Tomlinson, c. 1900
- Born: June 22, 1816; Ruskington, United Kingdom
- Died: May 10, 1905 (aged 88); Cedar Rapids, Iowa
- Resting place: Woodland Cemetery, Cleveland, Ohio
- Education: The Mechanics' Institute
- Occupations: Bridge builder, lighthouse engineer, cabinetmaker
- Spouse(s): Ann B. Northrup (m. 1843; died 1853) Sarah A. Wyles (m. 1853)
- Children: Ida; Ione; Maria; Ann; Joseph; Alfred Thomas; Fannie Wyles; Frances Ethel
- Parent(s): Joseph Tomlinson, Ann Shearwood

Joseph Tomlinson (June 22, 1816 – May 10, 1905) was an English-American engineer and architect who built bridges and lighthouses in Canada and the United States. In 1868, he co-designed and oversaw the construction of the Hannibal Bridge, the first permanent crossing of the Missouri River. He was the first person to hold the position of General Superintendent of Lighthouses for the new Dominion of Canada, holding that position beginning in January 1870. For eight years, he worked building railroad bridges for the Canadian government, and designed one of the most impressive bridges on the Canadian Pacific Railway where it crossed the Fraser River. He designed a railroad bridge over the Ashtabula River in Ohio, but was fired from the project after he refused to make supervisor-ordered changes to the design which he considered unsafe. The bridge failed on December 29, 1876, killing 92 people in a train derailment.

== Early life and education ==
Tomlinson was born June 22, 1816, in Ruskington, Lincolnshire, in the United Kingdom to Joseph and Ann (née Shearwood) Tomlinson. (Note: His mother's maiden name is also listed as "Sherwood".) His father was a land owner and farmer, and the family was related to Canadian politician Nicholas Sparks. Joseph was one of 14 children.

Tomlinson showed a strong interest in mechanical design as a child, but his parents sought to give him a classical education. When he proved disinterested in the classics, he was allowed to apprentice to a cabinetmaker. Tomlinson spent seven years as an apprentice, and soon his work surpassed even that of his teachers. During this time, he also enrolled at the Mechanics' Institute in Newark, Nottinghamshire. He studied draughtsmanship and mathematics and was considered an outstanding student.

== Career ==
Tomlinson emigrated to the United States in 1840. During the ocean voyage, he met a man from New Milford, Connecticut, who persuaded him to settle in that town. Although trained as a mechanic, Tomlinson discovered the practice mechanical construction in the United States was much different than that in the United Kingdom, and he found himself unemployed.

=== Early bridge work ===
Shortly after his arrival in New Milford, Tomlinson observed a bridge being constructed near the town. Concerned that the bridge had not been properly designed, he informed the builder only to have his opinion disregarded. Tomlinson then informed his new friend, Rev. Noah Porter (later President of Yale University), about his misgivings. The bridge partially collapsed under its own weight as Tomlinson had predicted, and he was employed to help repair and strengthen it.

Tomlinson turned to the practice of engineering on the advice of Rev. Porter. To learn his new trade, he found work as a rodman with the Housatonic Railroad. (Note: A rodman is a surveyor's assistant. The rodman usually holds the level staff, calling out readings and identifying the places where it will be used. He also holds the range pole, assists the levelman in identifying landscape contours, and makes computations for the levelman.) He also worked for several bridge construction firms, learning the trade and principles of American bridge design. In his spare time, he drafted and designed bridges for himself, seeking criticism and advice from Housatonic Railroad bridge engineers he worked under. In time, the Housatonic asked him to study bridges designed by other engineers and make reports about them. He was eventually employed as a bridge construction worker and supervisor for the Housatonic Railroad, the Harlem Railroad in New York, and the Rutland and Whitehall Railroad in Vermont. Although most railroad bridges at the time were made of wood, Tomlinson foresaw that iron and steel would swiftly supplant wood as the primary construction material. A lifelong self-learner who studied and read widely, he learned the principles of iron and steel construction and engineering.

The first bridge to be built to a Tomlinson design was a railroad bridge in Pittsfield, Connecticut. It was constructed in 1844, and Tomlinson himself acted as the general contractor.

In 1849, the Saratoga and Washington Railroad resolved to build a tunnel through a hill in the village of Whitehall, New York. The tunnel was to carry a branch line of the railroad, which would terminate on the shores of Lake Champlain. This would give the railroad a connection with Great Lakes passenger steamships, and connect the lake by rail to the Hudson River. Several previous attempts to dig a tunnel had failed due to the presence of quicksand. When Tomlinson received the commission to design the dig and completed tunnel, he worked on his plans for 72 hours without a break or sleep. The tunnel, which ran partly beneath Church Street in Whitehall, was 682 feet (208 m) long, with walls of stone and arches of brick. (Note: The tunnell was turned into an open cut spanned by bridges. Work on this project began in 1927.)

=== New Brunswick work ===
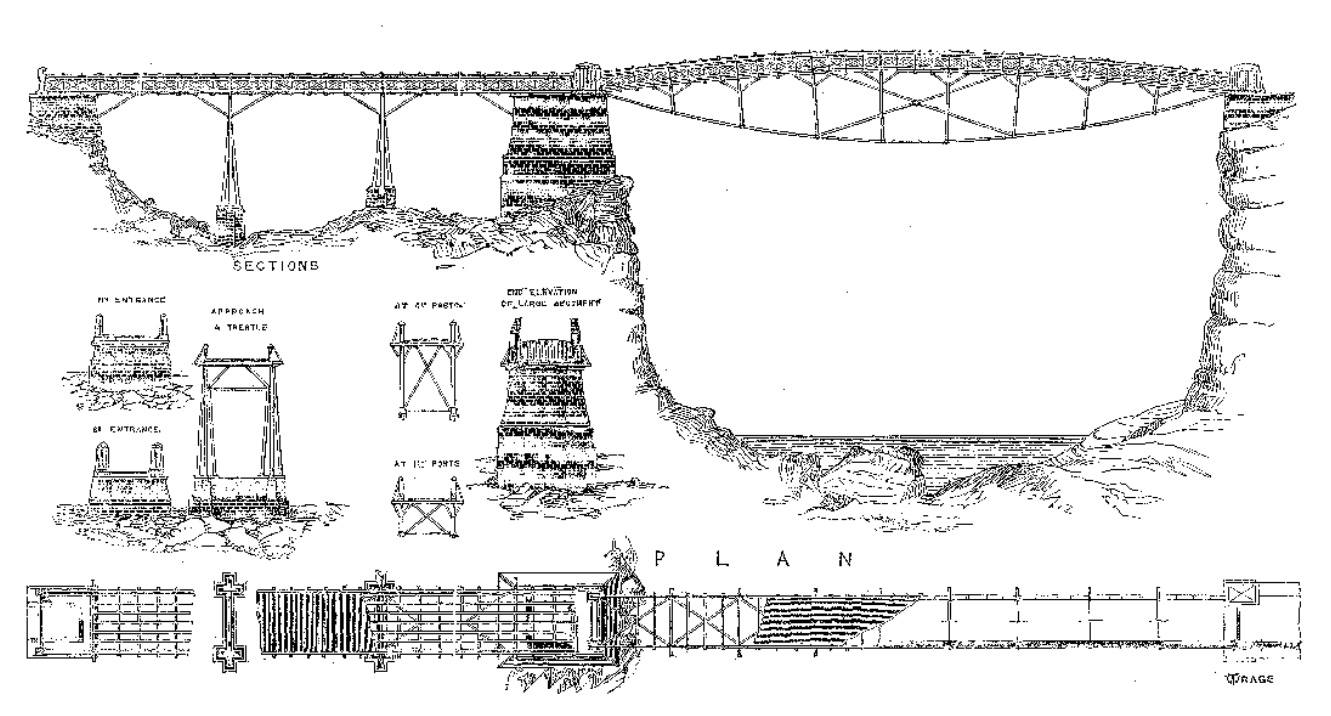
The Grand Falls Bridge, the first bridge designed by Tomlinson to collapse.

Tomlinson took a job as a bridge engineer with the government of the British colony (now Canadian province) of New Brunswick in 1854. Tomlinson later estimated he built 13 or 14 bridges a year during his eight years in New Brunswick. Nearly all the bridges he built in New Brunswick were made of wood. His designs were so sturdy that most of the bridges were still standing a half century later. The first bridge he designed and built was a 250-foot (76 m) long structure over the Hammond River, finished in 1855. The following year he built a 100-foot (30 m) long drawbridge with a 40-foot (12 m) draw span over the Musquash River at Musquash, New Brunswick.

The first Tomlinson-designed bridge to collapse was a lenticular truss bridge over the Grand Falls of the Saint John River at the recently founded city of Grand Falls. The New Brunswick Board of Works argued against a suspension bridge, (Note: Three reasons were given: (1) That the spray of the falls would, in cold weather, form ice on the bridge and cause it to collapse; (2) That the extreme heat of summer and intense cold of winter would cause the tie rods that formed the chain beneath the bridge to expand and contract and become damaged; and (3) That too many suspension bridges had collapsed, rendering their design too uncertain.) and forced Tomlinson to design a lenticular bridge. The bridge opened on December 1, 1858. At 7 AM on December 18, the bridge collapsed after the tension-bar chain snapped in two places. Two men were killed. The cause of the collapse was defective iron, which became brittle in cold weather. The Board of Works assumed complete responsibility for the failure of the bridge, and Tomlinson declined to charge the government for his work. He designed a 630-foot (190 m) suspension bridge as a replacement; that bridge remained standing for decades, and became the best-known of his bridges.

=== Ohio and Missouri ===
After purchasing a farm on the Cedar River in Putnam Township near Cedar Rapids, Iowa, Tomlinson moved there in 1862 and briefly took up farming. He moved to Cleveland, Ohio, later that year and began designing bridges for the Lake Shore and Michigan Southern Railway (LS&MS). He designed and built between 12 and 15 bridges a year for the railroad. Tomlinson moved into architecture as well, designing a number of buildings in Cleveland. (Note: Most architects in the United States trained as carpenters and builders, as there were no formal apprenticeships or educational programs until late in the 19th century. Only a handful of American architects engaged in formal study at the École des Beaux-Arts in Paris, France.) Among the most important of Tomlinson's commissions was the Central Market, an indoor market space located at Ontario Street and Eagle Avenue. Built in 1867 at a cost of $20,000 ($461,000 in 2025 dollars), the facility contained space for 200 vendors. Tomlinson also won the contract to build all the marble-topped meat and vegetable stalls inside the market. (Note: The Central Market survived until 1949, when it burned down in a fire.) Tomlinson also designed the Central Way drawbridge over the Cuyahoga River, which was built in 1866.

His efforts on behalf of the LS&MS garnered him widespread notice in the railroad industry, and he signed several contracts to build railroad bridges in Indiana. He sold these contracts to others when the railroads failed to fund construction. From 1848 to 1849, he worked for Schuyler Bros., designing and overseeing some of the early construction on the Illinois Central Railroad during this time as well. He left this work after the railroad encountered financial difficulties.

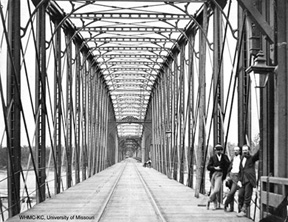
The Hannibal Bridge in July 1869, Tomlinson is on the far left

Tomlinson got word in 1867 that civil engineer Octave Chanute was attempting to build a railroad bridge (the Hannibal Bridge) across the Missouri River at Kansas City, Missouri. He communicated with Chanute, expressing his interest in working on the bridge. Chanute hired him as one of the bridge's co-designers (Note: The other designers were Chanute and George S. Morison.) in October 1867. Tomlinson relocated to Kansas City from Cleveland to work on the bridge. Tomlinson designed the bridge's superstructure, and supervised the overall construction of the bridge. When the piers in the river were washed out, Chanute asked Tomlinson to rebuild them. Tomlinson created entirely new designs for the piers and their foundations, and then oversaw their construction. The bridge opened on July 4, 1869, with a ceremony in which Chanute presented Tomlinson with a gold watch. The bridge was the first permanent crossing of the Missouri River.

=== Ashtabula River railroad disaster ===
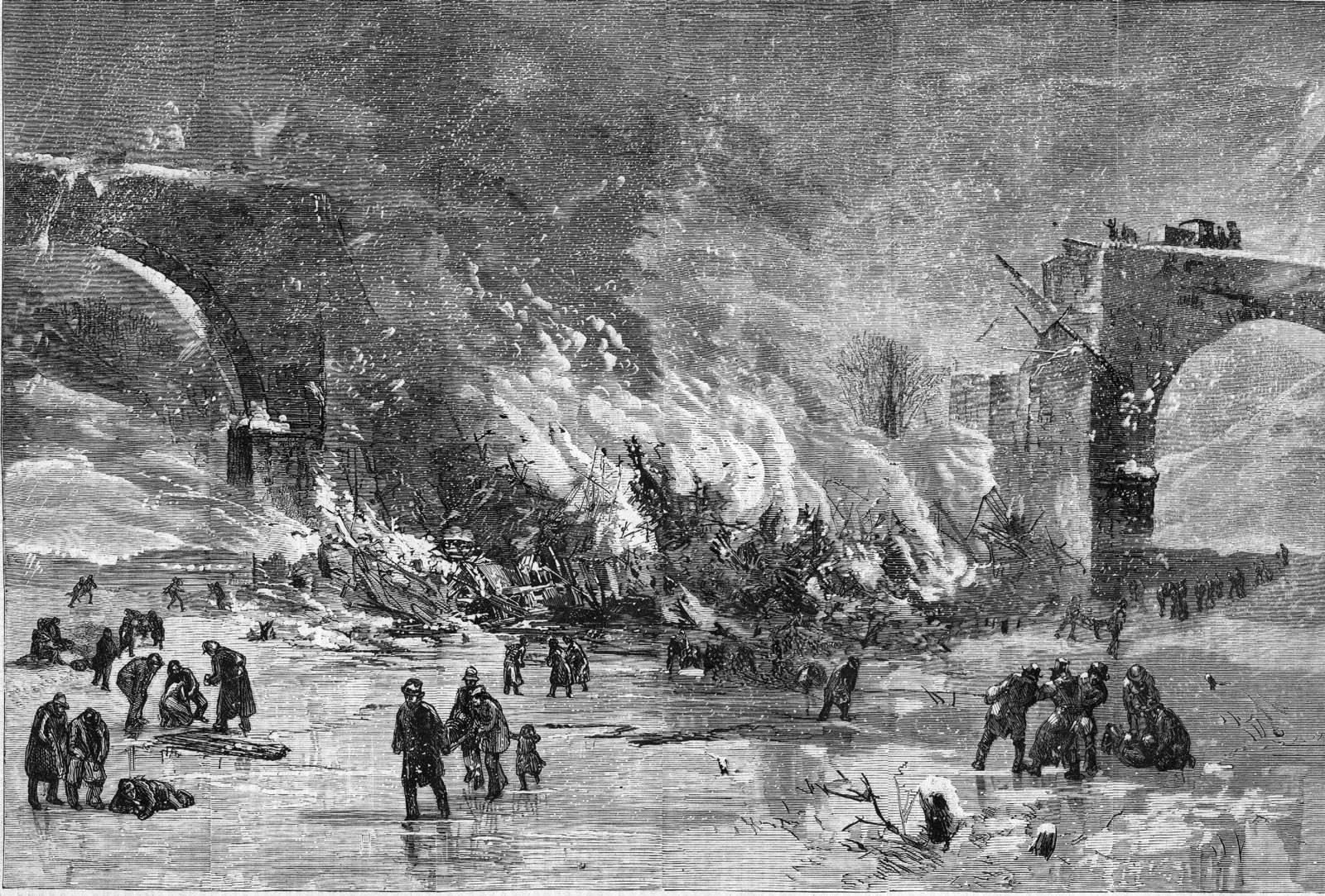
Wood engraving published in Harper's Weekly January 20, 1877

In 1863, officials of the Cleveland, Painesville and Ashtabula Railroad (CP&A; one of the predecessors of the Lake Shore and Michigan Southern Railway), (Note: The Lake Shore & Southern Michigan Railway was formed on April 6, 1969. Many sources say that the LS&MS built the bridge over the Ashtabula River, but these sources appear to be using a form of literary shorthand—using the company's better-known later name.) decided to replace the wooden bridge over the Ashtabula River just east of the village of Ashtabula, Ohio with an iron structure. Amasa Stone was president of the CP&A. His construction firm had built the CP&A main line from 1850 to 1852, and Stone had purchased the patent rights to brother-in-law William Howe's truss bridge in 1842. Stone resolved to construct a Howe truss bridge, a commonly used type of railroad bridge, and personally designed the new bridge. At 154 feet (47 m) long and 20 feet (6.1 m) high, it would be the longest and highest Howe truss bridge in the nation. (Note: The bridge was 19.5 feet (5.9 m) wide.) Stone also decided to award the contract for the ironwork to the Cleveland Rolling Mills, an iron and steel company based in Cleveland, Ohio, run by his older brother, Andros Stone.

Amasa Stone's bridge was, by his own admission, experimental. He had constructed only one all-iron Howe truss bridge before, a 5-foot (1.5 m) high, 30-foot (9.1 m) long railroad bridge over the Ohio and Erie Canal in Cleveland. (Note: This bridge was Ohio's first all-iron bridge.) Tomlinson fleshed out the bridge design for Stone. He was alarmed when Stone demanded that the bridge be constructed completely of iron, rather than a combination of wood and iron. (Note: The patented Howe truss bridge design used wooden beams for the diagonal and horizontal members, and iron beams for the vertical members.) An all-iron bridge would have a much greater deadweight, reducing the bridge's live load (its ability to carry trains). He also concluded that the beams Stone intended to use were undersized. (Note: Each I-beam was 6 inches (150 mm) thick and 8 inches (200 mm) wide.) Stone demanded that Tomlinson make the changes he required. Tomlinson refused, and was fired. Stone then ordered the CP&A's chief engineer, Charles Collins, to make the desired changes to the bridge design. Collins refused, and was fired. Stone himself then made the changes to the design. (Note: Brockman says that the design changes were made with the assistance of A.L. Rogers, a carpenter who had never built a bridge before. Amasa Stone, however, said in 1877 that Rogers only had supervision of construction. Rogers himself denied designing any of the bridge.) (Note: Stone made additional changes to the design as well. The Howe truss bridge chords (the outside members of the truss) extended upward to the support truss. The deck on which the train traveled hung from these chords. Amasa Stone inverted this design so that the chords hung downward, supporting the truss. Inverted Howe truss bridges had a tendency to buckle where the chords where attached to the deck with cast iron angle blocks. Nearly all Howe truss bridges had two diagonal chords in each "panel", with vertical beams on each end. End panels had three vertical beams. Only five Howe truss bridges ever built by 1863 had just one diagonal chord and more than two vertical beams in the end panels. These were known as "Single Howe" bridges. Amasa Stone used the "Single Howe" design for the end panels. Thus, the bridge's entire structure relied on just six beams (three at each end).)

The Ashtabula River bridge was erected in 1865 using Stone's design and partly under his supervision. (Note: Amasa Stone fired Tomlinson for "inefficiency" at some point during the bridge's construction. Tomlinson was replaced by carpenter A.L. Rogers.) When the temporary wooden trestle supporting the new bridge was removed, the bridge buckled where the chords were connected to the deck. To correct this problem, Stone added more iron I-beams to brace the chords. This worsened the bridge's deadweight problem. Because the angle blocks were not designed to accommodate the braces, Stone ordered workers to cut away portions of the I-beams to make them fit. This further weakened the braces. During the repair work, workers inadvertently installed the I-beam braces sideways rather than vertically, weakening the ability of the braces to reinforce the bridge. There is evidence that some I-beams were then installed correctly, but that the angle blocks were damaged in the process. Furthermore, in every other joint, the diagonal chords were fitted to the angle blocks using shims rather than tightening the vertical beams and putting the diagonals under compression. Rather than rely on the truss design to carry live loads, the shims carried this weight by themselves. (Note: It is also possible that the shims created uneven contact, causing angle blocks to undergo both bending and shearing.) At the ends of the bridge, where Stone used only a single diagonal, only half of the angle block received load. This put enormous shear stress on the angle block.

At 7:30 PM on December 29, 1876, the Ashtabula River bridge collapsed in what came to be known as the Ashtabula River railroad disaster. Two locomotives hauling 11 passenger railcars of the Lake Shore and Michigan Southern Railway plunged 150 feet (46 m) into the ice-clogged river below. The wooden cars burst into flame when their kerosene-fed heating stoves and oil lamps overturned, and rescue personnel made no attempt to extinguish the fire. The accident killed 92 people and injured 64.

An investigation was immediately begun into the cause of the bridge's collapse. This took two months. The proximate cause of the bridge collapse was the failure of the two angle blocks on the west end of the bridge due to fatigue (caused by bending and shear stress), friction, thrust stress from improperly fitting chords and vertical beams, and low temperatures (which caused the cast iron to become brittle). This caused the horizontal deck beams to buckle, and the bridge to collapse. State investigators later concluded that the bridge had been improperly designed. However, faulty materials were also use in its construction. (Note: At least one of the broken angle blocks had a void in the center. The void itself weakens the integrity of the block. Voids also encourage the formation of large grains and can accumulate impurities like slag, both of which increase the brittleness of the iron.) There was also extensive evidence that the bridge had been poorly constructed: Vertical beams were not in the correct place, chords were not tied together, the bearings had been improperly laid, and horizontal beams did not meet the angle blocks straight. The railway had also inadequately inspected and maintained the bridge. (Note: Locomotive engineers reported hearing "snapping sounds" as they crossed the bridge for some years prior to the collapse. This likely indicates that some shims had broken and fallen off, creating space between the diagonals and horizontal beams.) Stone categorically denied that there were any design or construction flaws, and blamed the collapse on the derailment of one of the two locomotives pulling the train.

=== Return to Canada ===
Culminating an almost 17 year effort, the British North America Act confederated the British colonies of Canada, New Brunswick, and Nova Scotia into a new self-governing, autonomous dominion, Canada, on July 1, 1867. (Note: The Province of Prince Edward Island did not enter into confederation until July 1, 1873. The Colony of Vancouver Island (established January 13, 1849) and the Colony of British Columbia (established August 2, 1858) merged into a new Colony of British Columbia on November 19, 1866, but did not confederate with the Dominion of Canada until July 20, 1871. The Colony of Newfoundland acquired dominion status on September 26, 1907. Labrador had been under the jurisdiction of Newfoundland since 1809, but it was not until March 1, 1927, however, the British government settled a long-running border dispute with the Dominion of Canada (and its predecessors, the Province of Quebec and Lower Canada) to settle Labrador's current boundary. The Province of Newfoundland and Labrador confederated on March 31, 1949.) Departments of the Province of Canada became ministries in the new federal government. Since the Province of Canada had no fisheries or marine departments, the new dominion government absorbed and amalgamated those from New Brunswick and Nova Scotia. Peter Mitchell, the former Premier of the Colony of New Brunswick, was named to the inaugural Senate of Canada and appointed Minister of Marine and Fisheries.

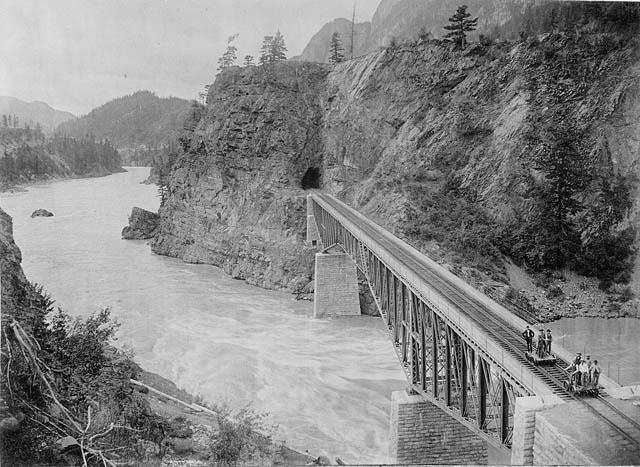
The Cisco Bridge

Mitchell was well-acquainted with Tomlinson's work in New Brunswick, and asked him to join the new Department of Marine and Fisheries. Tomlinson agreed, and began working for the department on January 1, 1870. He was formally appointed General Superintendent of Lighthouses and Constructive Engineer on May 5, 1871. His duties in regards to new lighthouses were to select sites, visit sites prior to construction, prepare plans and specifications, visit sites during construction, and examine and report on the lighthouses once finished. He was also to inspect existing lighthouses, report on their condition, and recommend needed repairs. (Note: The department oversaw 251 existing lighthouses at the time of Tomlinson's initial employment.) Tomlinson initially faced the difficult job of integrating the policies and practices of more than a dozen local, provincial, and regional lighthouse boards into a common code. He then had to develop designs for lighthouses. This project was especially difficult, as almost no plans for existing lighthouses existed to help inform best practices in lighthouse construction. By 1872, the department had erected 93 lighthouses with another 43 under contract. All of the structures were wooden, and each cost less than CAD$10,000. The number of lighthouses expanded so rapidly in the first five years of Tomlinson's work that in 1876 the Department of Marine and Fisheries established six regional agencies to take over responsibility for their operation and upkeep. Among the hundreds of lighthouses designed by Tomlinson, the East End Light and West End Light on Sable Island and Greenly Island are examples of his best work. (Note: The West End Light, erected in 1873, was dismantled in 1888 due to erosion and replaced. The East End Light, also built in 1873, was destroyed by weather in 1917. The Greenly Island Lighthouse was erected in 1876, and was destroyed by fire in 1947.)

Tomlinson transferred to the Department of Railways on February 9, 1880, taking a position as inspector of bridges in railways. During his time with the department, he created standardized designs for wooden bridges and trestles for those portions of the Canadian Pacific Railway being built by the federal government. In 1882, the department sent Tomlinson to Newcastle upon Tyne in England to supervise the manufacture and prefabrication of the metalwork Cisco Bridge. The 535-foot (163 m) long cantilever truss bridge over the Fraser River, this was the first balanced cantilevered truss bridge in the world to be built with a steel deck. Tomlinson also served as a construction superintendent for general contractor John McMullen. Completed in 1884, this bridge has been called "one of the most imposing engineering works on the Canadian Pacific Railway's transcontinental main line" by rail historian Michael Batten. (Note: The bridge was moved slightly from its original location in 1911 and heavily reinforced in 1940, but remained otherwise unaltered as of 1985.)

Tomlinson left the employ of the Department of Railways on either October 16, 1886 or February 9, 1888. (Note: The date of his retirement is the source of some confusion in other sources. The Cedar Rapids Gazette and the Biographical Record of Linn County, Iowa reported he retired in 1883. Anderson and Waddell and Heydon both claim he retired in 1885. The 1883 date seems unlikely, as Tomlinson was at work on the Cisco Bridge until 1884.)

== Retirement and death ==
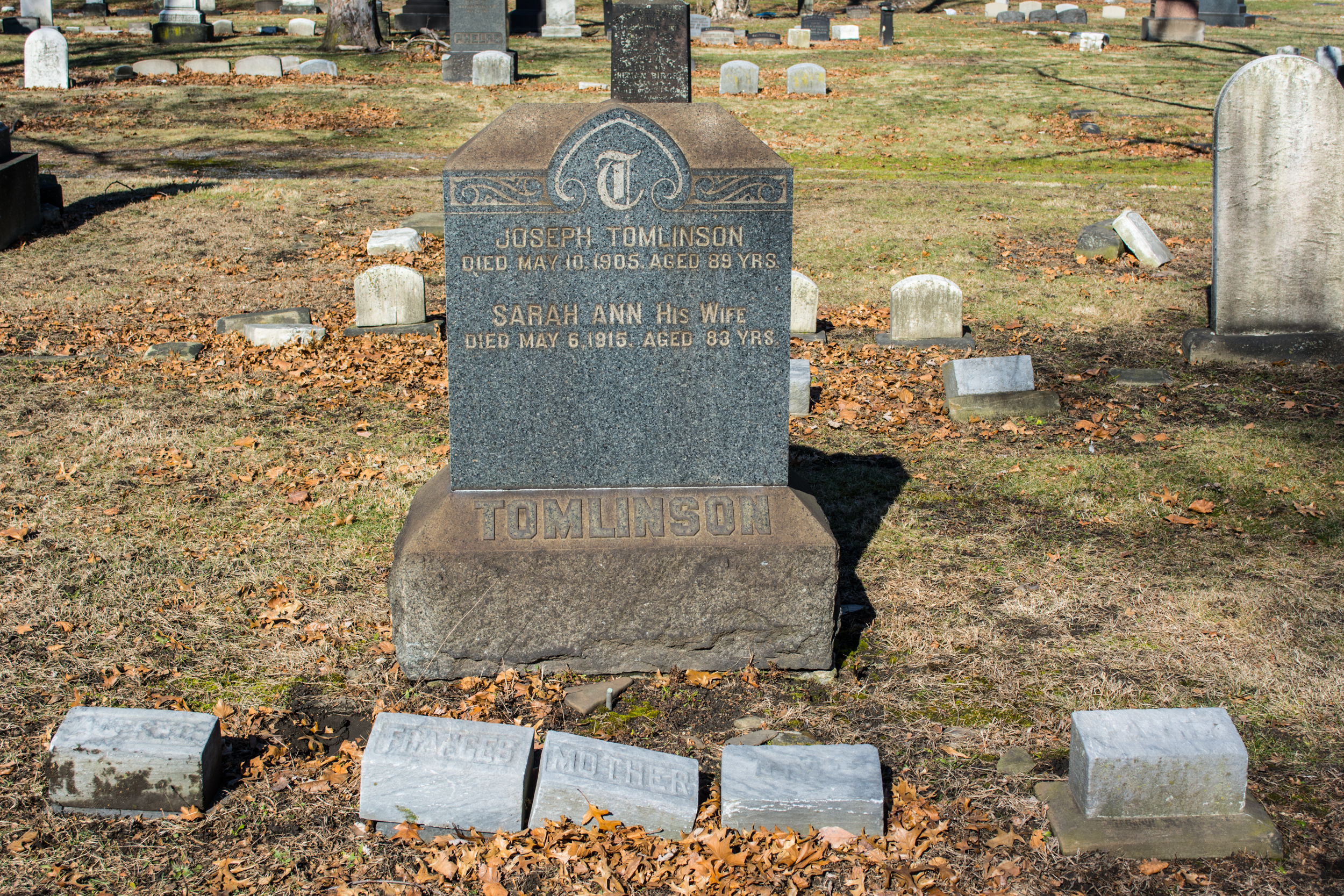
Grave of Joseph Tomlinson and his second wife, Sarah Ann Wyles Tomlinson, at Woodland Cemetery in Cleveland, Ohio

Tomlinson retired to a home at 217 North 13th Street in Cedar Rapids, Iowa, leaving the Department of Railways. After the American Civil War, he purchased another 1,280 acres (520 ha) of farmland for $800 ($17,600 in 2025 dollars). Tomlinson sold a portion of his land at some point, because by 1878 he only retained about 816 acres (330 ha). His eldest son managed the farm for him.

In the last years of his life, Tomlinson suffered from declining health, which included cerebrovascular disease. He retained his mental faculties, however. In the months just before his death, Tomlinson began working out the design for an extremely long suspension bridge. He received three patents for his design. Joseph Tomlinson died of a stroke on May 10, 1905, while gardening at his home. He was buried in Woodland Cemetery in Cleveland, Ohio.

== Personal life ==
Tomlinson was quite strong, and when younger often engaged in manual labor and construction work. He was an easy-going and kind supervisor, and much admired by his work crews. When others were still erecting bridges primarily from experience and rules of thumb, Tomlinson calculated load limits and strain using advanced mathematics.

Tomlinson was a skilled carpenter, and built furniture for his own home throughout his life. From his farming father, Tomlinson learned a love of farming and gardening. Until the end of his life, he remained an avid home gardener, and had a deep fondness for flowers. Influenced by the Chartist movement, Tomlinson became a socialist in adolescence and continued to advocate for socialist political goals throughout his life. Tomlinson was also a Freemason, a supporter of the Republican Party, and a lifelong member of the Episcopal Church. He was a member of Grace Episcopal Church in Cedar Rapids at the time of his death.

=== Wives and children ===
Joseph Tomlinson married Ann R. Northrop of New Milford on December 10, 1843. (Note: Heydon lists Ann's middle initial as "B", and spells the last name as "Northrup".) The couple had three daughters: Ida (wife of George Venable Smith), Ione, and Maria (who died in childhood). The Tomlinsons moved to Iowa City, Iowa, in 1852, where Ann Tomlinson fell ill and died on January 15, 1853. He moved to Brooklyn, New York, shortly after his first wife's death. He married Sarah A. Wyles (also an emigrant from Lincolnshire) on September 10, 1853. The couple had five children: Ann (wife of Robert Nicholas Slater), Joseph, Alfred, Fannie (who died at the age of five), and Frances.

== Legacy ==
The Engineering Record called Tomlinson "a pioneer designer and builder of steel bridges in this country." The Cedar Rapids Gazette called him one of the most preeminent bridge designers of the last half of the 19th century.

Tomlinson was inducted as an honorary member of The Pi Eta Scientific Society.

== Bibliography ==
- Åkesson, Björn (2008). Understanding Bridge Collapses. London: Taylor & Francis. ISBN 9780415436236.
- Anderson, William P.; Waddell, J.A.L. (1905). "Memoir of Joseph Tomlinson". Transactions of the Canadian Society of Civil Engineers: 321–325.
- Annual Report of the Department of Marine and Fisheries for the Year Ending 30th June, 1871. Ottawa: I.B. Taylor, Printer to the King. 1872.
- Ashcroft, John (1865). Ashcroft's Railway Directory for 1865. New York: John Ashcroft. hdl:2027/njp.32101066799063.
- Batten, Michael (March–April 1985). "The Great Cantilever Bridge 100 Years Later" (PDF). Canadian Rail. pp. 40–45. Archived from the original (PDF) on July 25, 2020.
- Becker, Thea Gallo (2004). Cleveland: 1796-1929. Charleston, S.C.: Arcadia Publishing. ISBN 9780738532677.
- Bianculli, Anthony J. (2003). Trains and Technology. Volume 4: Bridges and Tunnels, Signals. Newark, Del.: University of Delaware Press. ISBN 9780874138030.
- Biographical Record of Linn County, Iowa. Chicago: S.J. Clarke Publishing Co. 1901.
- Brockmann, R. John (2005). Twisted Rails, Sunken Ships: The Rhetoric of Nineteenth Century Steamboat and Railroad Accident Investigation Reports, 1833-1879. Amityville, N.Y.: Baywood Publishing Co. ISBN 9780895032911.
- Browne, G.P. (2009). Documents on the Confederation of British North America. Montreal: McGill-Queen's University Press. ISBN 9780773536029.
- Buckner, Phillip Alfred (1995). The Atlantic Region to Confederation: A History. Toronto: University of Toronto Press. ISBN 9780802069771.
- Bush, Edward F. (1974). "The Canadian Lighthouse". Canadian Historic Sites: Occasional Papers in Archaeology and History No. 9 (PDF). Ottawa: Parks Canada.
- Chadwick, Gerald William St John (1967). Newfoundland: Island Into Province. Cambridge, U.K.: Cambridge University Press. OCLC 1129739.
- De Villiers, Marq; Hirtle, Sheila (2004). Sable Island: The Strange Origins and Curious History of a Dune Adrift in the Atlantic. New York: Walker & Co. ISBN 9780802714329.
- Delaware and Hudson Company (1927). Delaware and Hudson Company Annual Report. Cleveland: Delaware and Hudson Company.
- Department of Public Works (1887). Annual Report of the Minister of Public Works for the Fiscal Year 1886-87 on the Works Under His Control. Ottawa: MacLean, Roger & Co.
- Dutka, Alan F. (2015). Misfortune on Cleveland's Millionaires' Row. Charleston, S.C.: The History Press. ISBN 9781467117982.
- Fisher, Robin (1992). Contact and Conflict: Indian-European Relations in British Columbia, 1774-1890. Vancouver, B.C.: University of British Columbia Press. ISBN 9780774804004.
- General Assembly of New Brunswick (1856). Journal of the Legislative Council of the Province of New Brunswick From the 17th to 26th of July 1856. Fredericton, N.B.: John Simpson, Printer.
- Gray, David H. (2016). "Bringing Old Mapping of Sable Island Into a Modern Geographic Reference Frame". Proceedings of the Nova Scotian Institute of Science. 48 (2): 310. doi:10.15273/PNSIS.V48I2.6661. S2CID 132100317.
- Heydon, Naomi Slater (1980). Looking Back: Pioneers of Bytown and March, Nicholas Sparks and Hamnett Kirkes Pinhey, Their Antecedents and Their Descendants. Ottawa, Ontario: Nemo Publications. ISBN 9780969061502.
- Ives, Howard Chapin; Hilts, Harold Ezra (1906). Problems in Surveying, Railroad Surveying, and Geodesy. New York: J. Wiley & Sons.
- Johnson, Crisfield (1878). History of Washington Co., New York. Philadelphia: Everts & Ensign.
- Linn County Historical Society (1878). The History of Linn County, Iowa. Chicago: Western Historical Company. ISBN 9781581034189.
- Middleton, William D. (2001). The Bridge at Québec. Bloomington, Ind.: Indiana University Press. ISBN 9780253337610.
- "Noted Engineer Ends Life Work". The Cedar Rapids Gazette. May 11, 1905.
- Ohio Commissioner of Railroads and Telegraphs (1874). Seventh Annual Report of the Commissioner of Railroads and Telegraphs of Ohio for the Year Ending June 30, 1873. Columbus, Ohio: Nevins and Myers, State Printers.
- Orth, Samuel Peter (1910). A History of Cleveland, Ohio. Volume I. Chicago: S.J. Clarke Publishing Co.
- Panton, Kenneth John (2015). Historical Dictionary of the British Empire. Lanham, Md.: Rowman & Littlefield. ISBN 9780810875241.
- "Personal Notes". The Engineering Record. June 3, 1905.
- Rogers, A.L. (1877). "Testimony of A.L. Rogers". Journal of the House of Representatives of the State of Ohio, for the Adjourned Session of the Sixty-Second General Assembly. Volume LXXIII. Springfield, Ohio: Elifritz & Winters.
- Selcer, Richard F. (2006). Civil War America: 1850 to 1875. New York: Facts on File. ISBN 9780816038671.
- Sharpe, Errol (1976). A People's History of Prince Edward Island. Toronto: Steel Rail Publishing. ISBN 9780887910036.
- Shaughnessy, Jim (1997). Delaware and Hudson: The History of an Important Railroad Whose Antecedent Was a Canal Network to Transport Coal. Syracuse, N.Y.: Syracuse University Press. ISBN 9780815604556.
- Short, Simine (2011). Locomotive to Aeromotive: Octave Chanute and the Transportation Revolution. Champaign, Ill.: University of Illinois Press. ISBN 9780252080142.
- Stone, Amasa (1877). "Testimony of Amasa Stone". Journal of the House of Representatives of the State of Ohio, for the Adjourned Session of the Sixty-Second General Assembly. Volume LXXIII. Springfield, Ohio: Elifritz & Winters.
- Tomlinson, Joseph (1877). "Testimony of Joseph Tomlinson". Journal of the House of Representatives of the State of Ohio, for the Adjourned Session of the Sixty-Second General Assembly. Volume LXXIII. Springfield, Ohio: Elifritz & Winters.
- Unsworth, John F. (2010). Design of Modern Steel Railway Bridges. Boca Raton, Fla.: CRC Press. ISBN 9781420082180.
