= Hannibal Bridge =

Bridge crossing the Missouri River

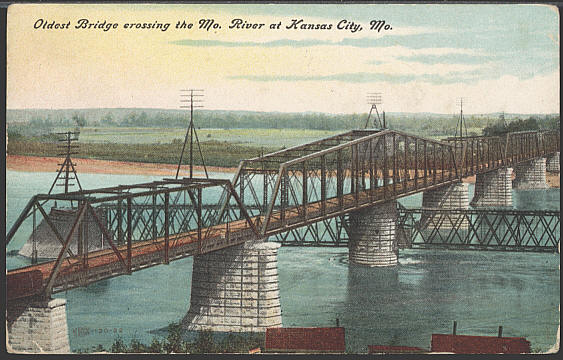
- A postcard c. 1908 shows the Hannibal Bridge after its reconstruction due to severe structural damage
- Coordinates: 39.112672°N 94.58864°W
- Carries: Railroad and pedestrians
- Crosses: Missouri River
- Locale: Kansas City, Missouri to North Kansas City, Missouri
- Other name(s): Kansas City Bridge

History
- Opened: July 3, 1869; 156 years ago
- Closed: 1917

The First Hannibal Bridge was the first permanent rail crossing of the Missouri River opening on July 3, 1869. It helped establish the City of Kansas (renamed Kansas City, Missouri, in 1889) as a major city and rail center. In its early days, it was called the Kansas City Bridge. It increased area train traffic, which contributed to the building of Union Depot, the predecessor to the Kansas City Union Station. It was severely damaged by a tornado and replaced in virtually the same location by the Second Hannibal Bridge.

== History ==
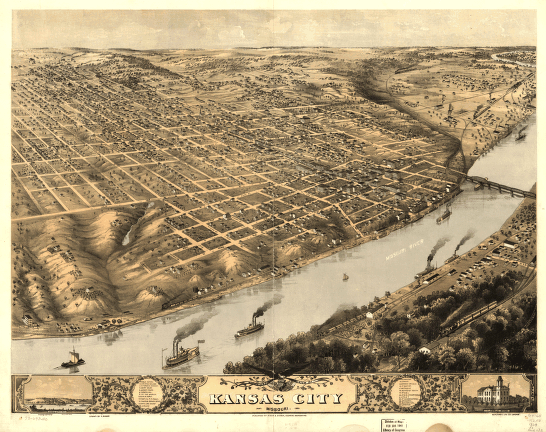
A map showing the Hannibal Bridge in 1869

Construction started in 1867, shortly after the end of the American Civil War, and was completed in 1869. The bridge was built for the Hannibal & St. Joseph Railroad by the Keystone Bridge Company. The completion of the bridge came after a short battle between Leavenworth, Kansas, and the City of Kansas for the Hannibal & St. Joseph Railroad bridge.

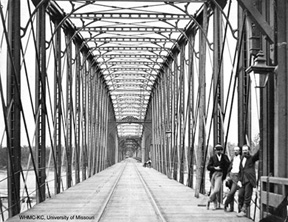
Joseph Tomlinson, Octave Chanute, and George S. Morison stand on the Hannibal Bridge in July 1869.

The bridge was designed by Octave Chanute, who also designed the Kansas City Stockyards and later became a pioneer in aviation. After hearing of the proposed bridge at the City of Kansas, Joseph Tomlinson contacted Chanute and they corresponded on how best to cross the Missouri River. In October 1867, Chanute hired Tomlinson as the superintendent of superstructure. George S. Morison, who later became a leading bridge designer in North America, apprenticed under the supervision of Tomlinson and Chanute during the construction of the bridge. It was a swing bridge that could open in under two minutes, and had an arched truss design. Construction cost $1 million (equivalent to $22.5 million in 2024).

In 1886, the bridge was severely damaged by a tornado that collapsed a middle span. It was reconstructed and its truss structure was altered from an arch design to a traditional truss design. It was later replaced by the Second Hannibal Bridge 200 feet (61 m) upstream on the northern bank, but at the same location on the southern bank where it enters into the gooseneck cut into the bluff.

== See also ==
- List of crossings of the Missouri River
