= Lexington Bridge (Lexington, Missouri) =

- After crossing the Lexington Bridge over the Missouri River, visitors were greeted with a war memorial at a "T" intersection.
- Coordinates: 39.186797°N 93.896456°W
- Carries: Route 13
- Crosses: Missouri River
- Locale: Lexington, Missouri

Characteristics
- Total length: 3,072.4 feet (936.5 m)
- Width: 20 feet (6.1 m)
- Height: 18.1 feet (5.5 m)
- No. of spans: 7

History
- Designer: Kansas City Bridge Company
- Opened: October 31, 1924
- Closed: June 25, 2005
- Replaced by: Ike Skelton Bridge

The Lexington Bridge was a seven-span truss bridge on Route 13 over the Missouri River at Lexington, Missouri, between Ray County, Missouri, and Lafayette County, Missouri. It was designed by the Kansas City Bridge Company and opened on October 31, 1924. The main span was 408 feet (124 m) and the total length was 3,072.4 feet (936.5 m). Its deck width was 20 feet (6.1 m) and it had vertical clearance of 18.1 feet (5.5 m). It was closed upon the opening of the new Ike Skelton Bridge on June 25, 2005, and was demolished the next month.

Original view of the Lexington Bridge around 1924

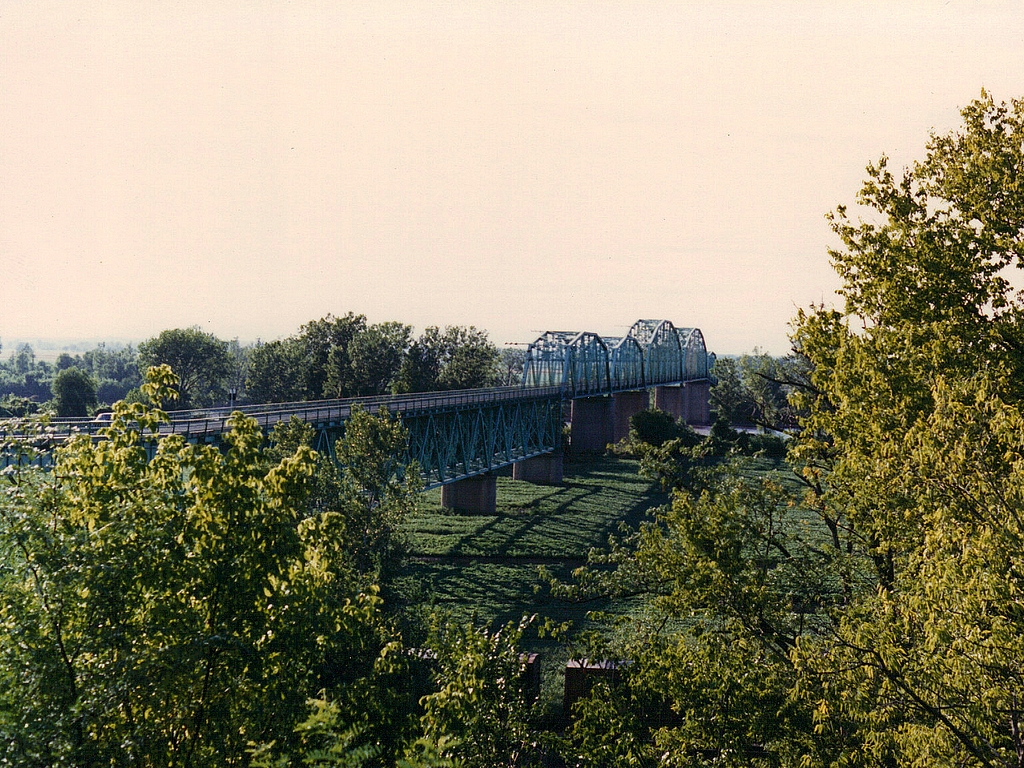
The bridge in 1987

== See also ==
- List of bridges documented by the Historic American Engineering Record in Missouri
- List of crossings of the Missouri River
