= Harry S. Truman Bridge =

Railroad bridge in Missouri, U.S.

Coordinates: 39.144722°N 94.48472°W

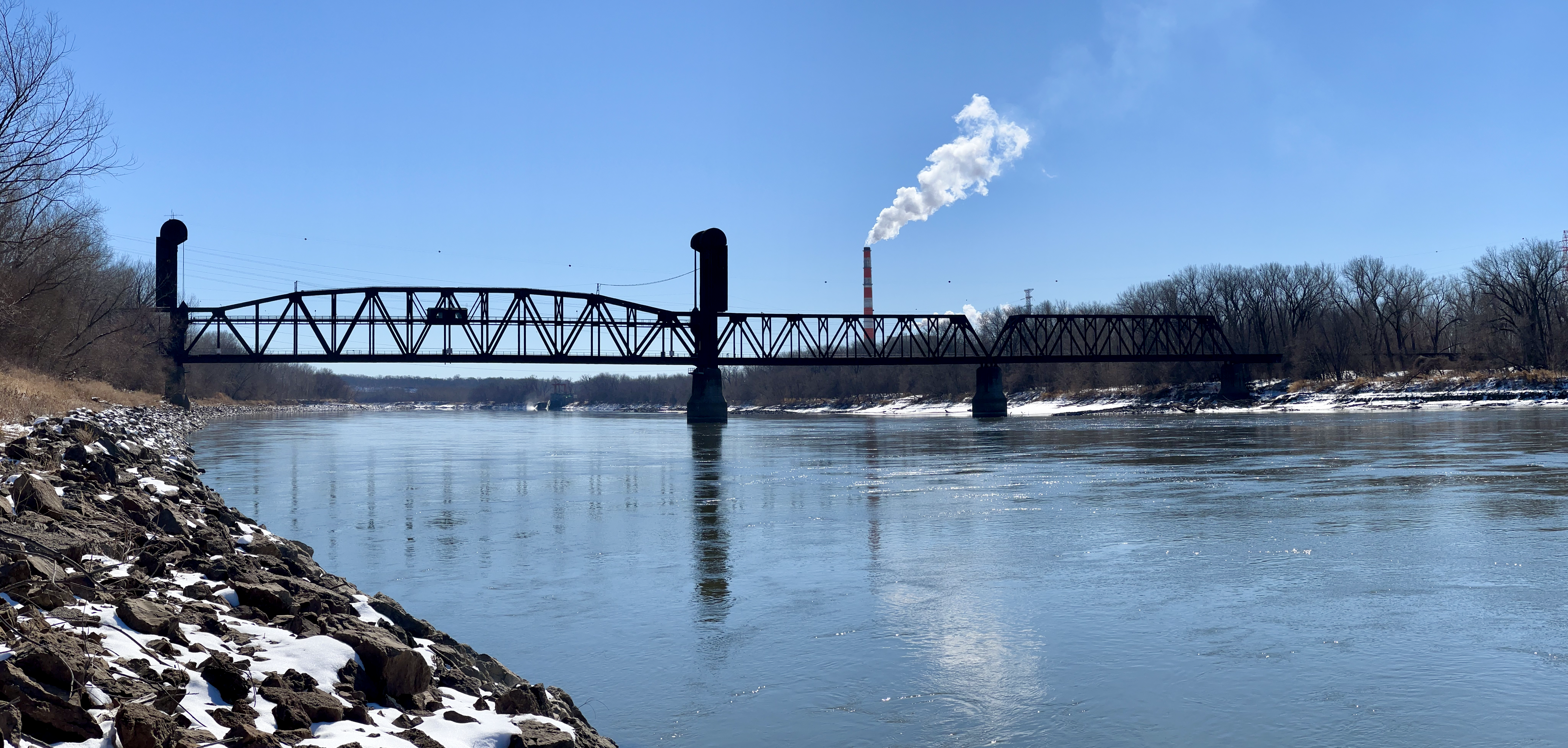
Harry S. Truman Bridge

The Harry S Truman Bridge is a vertical lift rail drawbridge over the Missouri River connecting Jackson County, Missouri with Clay County, Missouri in Kansas City, Missouri. It has a 427-foot main span, and is the tenth longest span in the United States.

The bridge was dedicated on May 23, 1945, for Jackson County native Harry S. Truman, who was president at the time. It was built by the Milwaukee Railroad and Rock Island Line at a cost of $3 million or $2.5 million. It is 6 miles (9.7 km) from the ASB Bridge. It is connected to the Kansas City Terminal Railway network through Kansas City.

It is now used by the freight trains of the Canadian Pacific and Union Pacific Railroad to cross the Missouri River.

== See also ==
- List of crossings of the Missouri River
