= Second Hannibal Bridge =

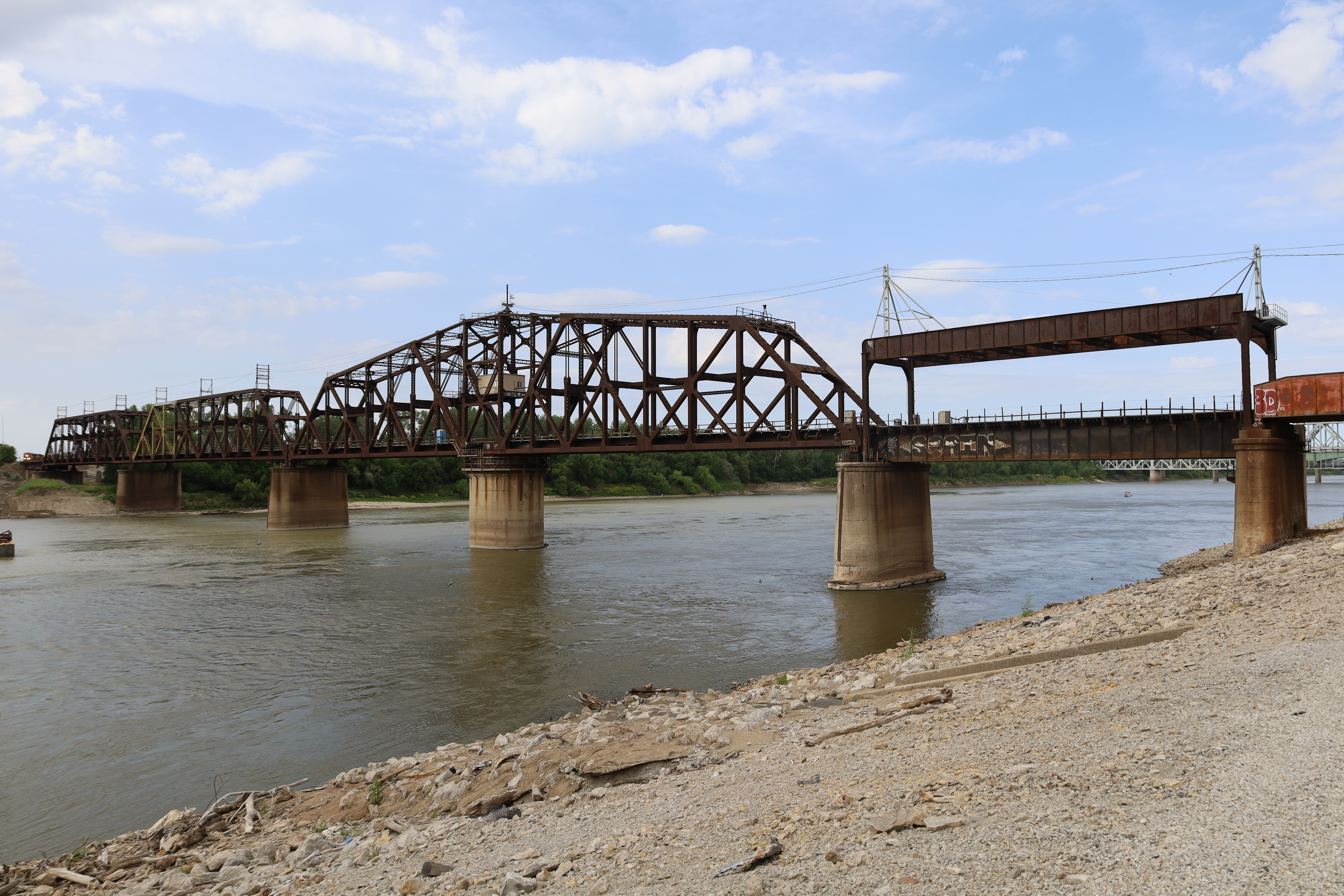
- The bridge in 2025
- Coordinates: 39°06′46″N 94°35′19″W
- Carries: BNSF Railway
- Crosses: Missouri River
- Locale: Kansas City, Missouri to North Kansas City, Missouri

Characteristics
- Design: truss bridge with swing span

History
- Opened: 1917

Location
- Interactive map of Second Hannibal Bridge

The Second Hannibal Bridge is a rail bridge over the Missouri River in Kansas City, Missouri, connecting Jackson County, Missouri, with Clay County, Missouri.

Opened in 1917, the bridge replaced the original Hannibal Bridge which crossed the river about 200 feet (61 m) downstream on the northern bank, but at virtually the same location on the southern bank. There are two decks on the bridge: the lower deck carried the railroad and the upper was for vehicular traffic. After the Buck O'Neil Bridge opened in 1956, vehicular traffic was switched over to the new span and the auto deck was removed later that year. The bridge is owned and maintained by the BNSF Railway and carries two tracks. A bridge tender at the bridge can open and close the drawspan as well as operate the nearby ASB Bridge, which is also owned by BNSF.

The Hannibal Bridge survived the 1951 Kansas City flood after being hit by four river boats that tore loose from the mouth of the Kansas River, forcing the swinging span open.

== See also ==
- List of crossings of the Missouri River
