= Old St. Charles Bridge =

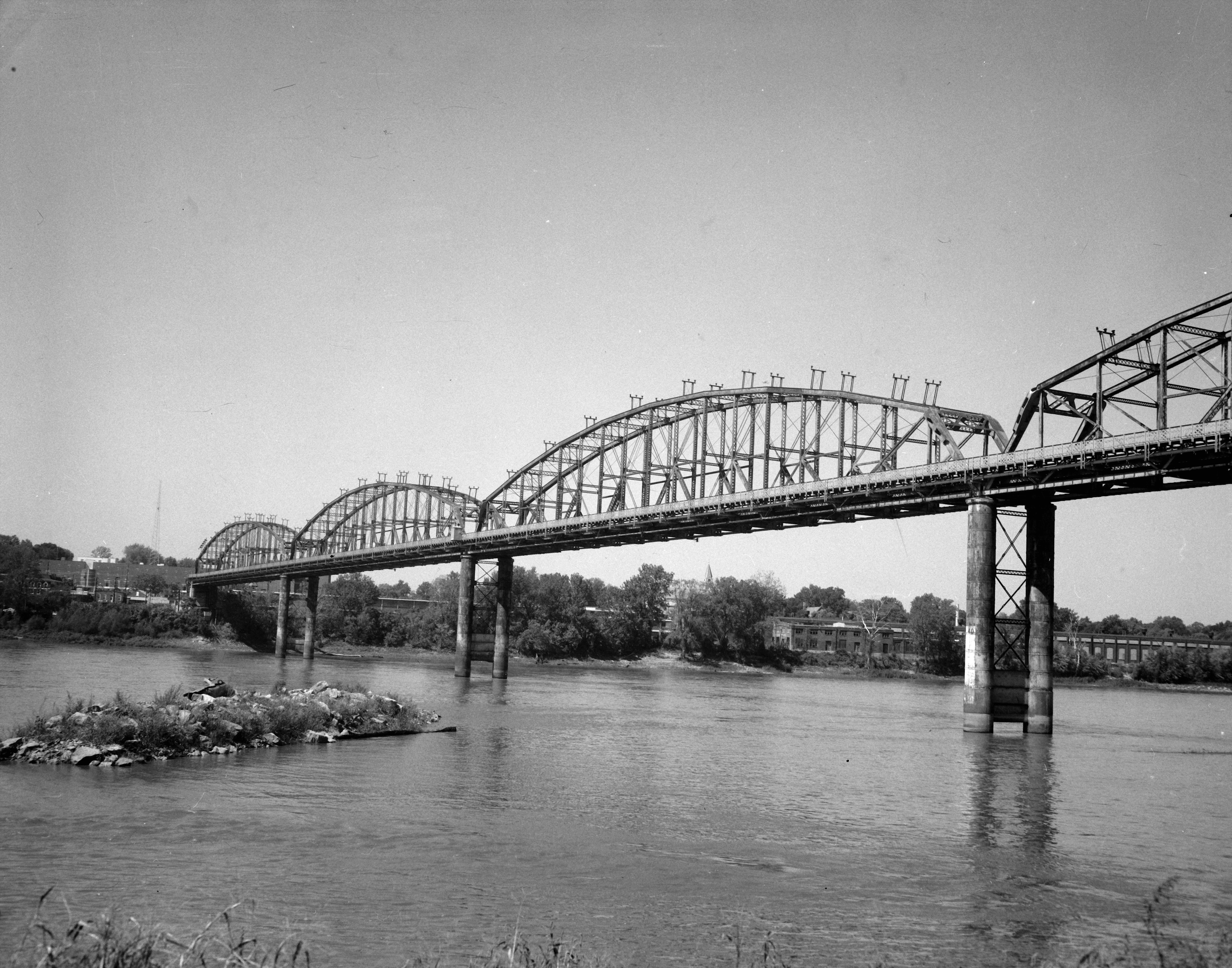
- Coordinates: 38°47′00″N 90°28′36″W
- Crosses: Missouri River
- Locale: St. Louis County and St. Charles County in Missouri

Characteristics
- Design: Truss bridge
- Total length: 2,873 feet (876 m)
- Width: 20 feet (6.1 m)
- Longest span: 420 feet (130 m)

History
- Opened: 1904
- Closed: 1998

Location
- Interactive map of Old St. Charles Bridge

The Old St. Charles Bridge once connected St. Louis County to the city of St. Charles.

== History ==
Construction on the bridge began in August, 1902 with the sinking of the piers. Workers who worked inside the piers were called sandhogs. They worked one hour at a time twice a day inside the piers. One worker died as a result of the bends.

Progress on the bridge was slow for several reasons. Shipments of raw materials including lumber and steel were delayed. Inclement weather threatened work stoppages on several occasions. A dispute developed over the right-of-way needed for construction that had to be settled in court. And finally, raw materials had to be stored on the St. Louis County side due to the lack of available space in St. Charles. This forced workers to ferry materials and supplies across the river when needed on the St. Charles side.

Construction was completed in the spring of 1904 in time for the world's fair in St. Louis. The bridge was a combination highway and streetcar bridge. The streetcar station at the western terminus of the bridge still stands at 2nd and Adams in St. Charles. It was operated as toll by the St. Charles and St. Louis County Bridge Company until December 1931. At that time it was incorporated in the state highway system as part of U.S. Route 40.

In the late 1920s, the bridge was fitted with a pair of 34.5kV transmission lines when the Union Electric Co. (now part of Ameren) extended its system into the St. Charles area. The original insulators used on the river spans were a unique style developed by the Lapp Insulator Co. of LeRoy, NY (the prevailing wisdom being the need to compensate for the higher humidity in the area of the river; standard 'post' style insulators were later installed as replacements when the original insulators failed).

Tolls and trolleys ceased crossing the bridge in January 1932.

In June 1959, the bridge was redesignated as part of Route 115 after a new U.S. Route 40 bridge opened that would later become part of Interstate 70. The bridge remained part of SR-115 until it was replaced by the Discovery Bridge.

It was documented for the Historic American Engineering Record in 1989.

It was closed to traffic in 1992 and demolished in 1998.

== See also ==
- List of bridges documented by the Historic American Engineering Record in Missouri
- List of crossings of the Missouri River
