= Chamberlain Rail Bridge =

Coordinates: 43.7984°N 99.3586°W

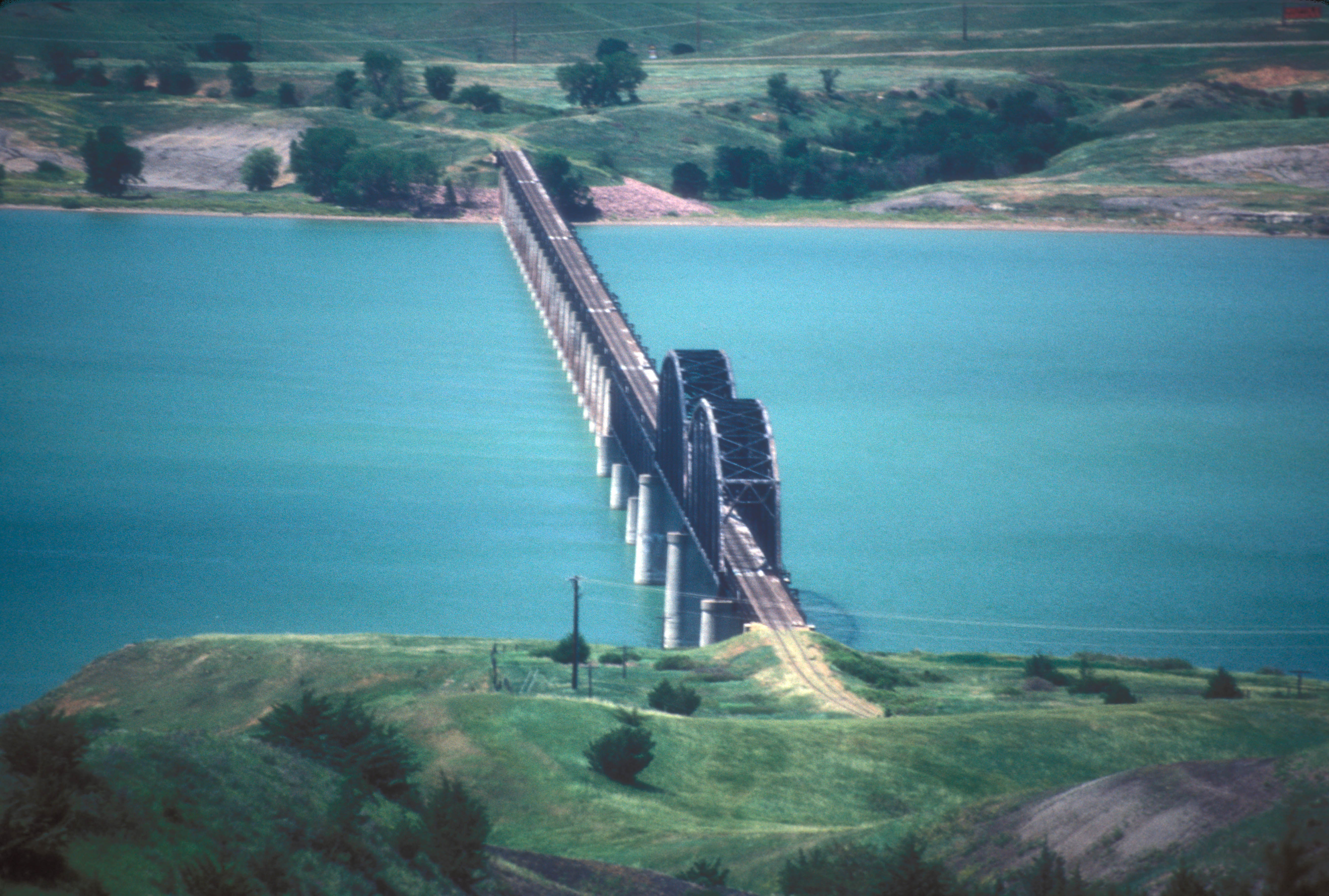
Chamberlain rail bridge

The Chamberlain Rail Bridge is a railroad bridge located the state of South Dakota which crosses the Missouri River, spanning 4,890 feet (0.9 mi) from the city of Chamberlain on the eastern side to the town of Oacoma, located on the western side of the river. It is owned by the state of South Dakota and operated by Dakota Southern Railway.

== History ==
The bridge formed the easternmost link of the Milwaukee Road's Black Hills Division. This line, completed in 1907, connected Rapid City, South Dakota to the company's Iowa and Dakota Division at Chamberlain. The present structure was constructed in 1953 to replace an earlier 1923 rail bridge that would have been submerged by the construction of dams on the Missouri River and subsequent creation of Lake Francis Case. The bridge uses sections from the older bridge, which are easily visible today. The bridge measures 4,890 feet (0.9 mi) long, which made it the longest bridge in the Chicago, Milwaukee, St. Paul and Pacific Railroad.

In 1980, the Milwaukee Road abandoned this line along with many others due to unprofitability and the looming corporate bankruptcy. The state of South Dakota bought the line, which included the bridge, from the Milwaukee Road. Until 1987, the line sat dormant.

In 1987, the Dakota Southern Railway, headquartered in Chamberlain, took over operations of the line, and it has been operated by them ever since, In the 1990s and early 2000s, due to lack of customers and grain not being profitable, no trains passed on this bridge westbound. However, with a 2005 agreement with the BNSF Railroad and a few repairs to the bridge, trains have been using the bridge ever since for westbound customers.
