= New Buck O'Neil Bridge =

Bridge in Missouri

Coordinates: 39.112°N 94.590°W

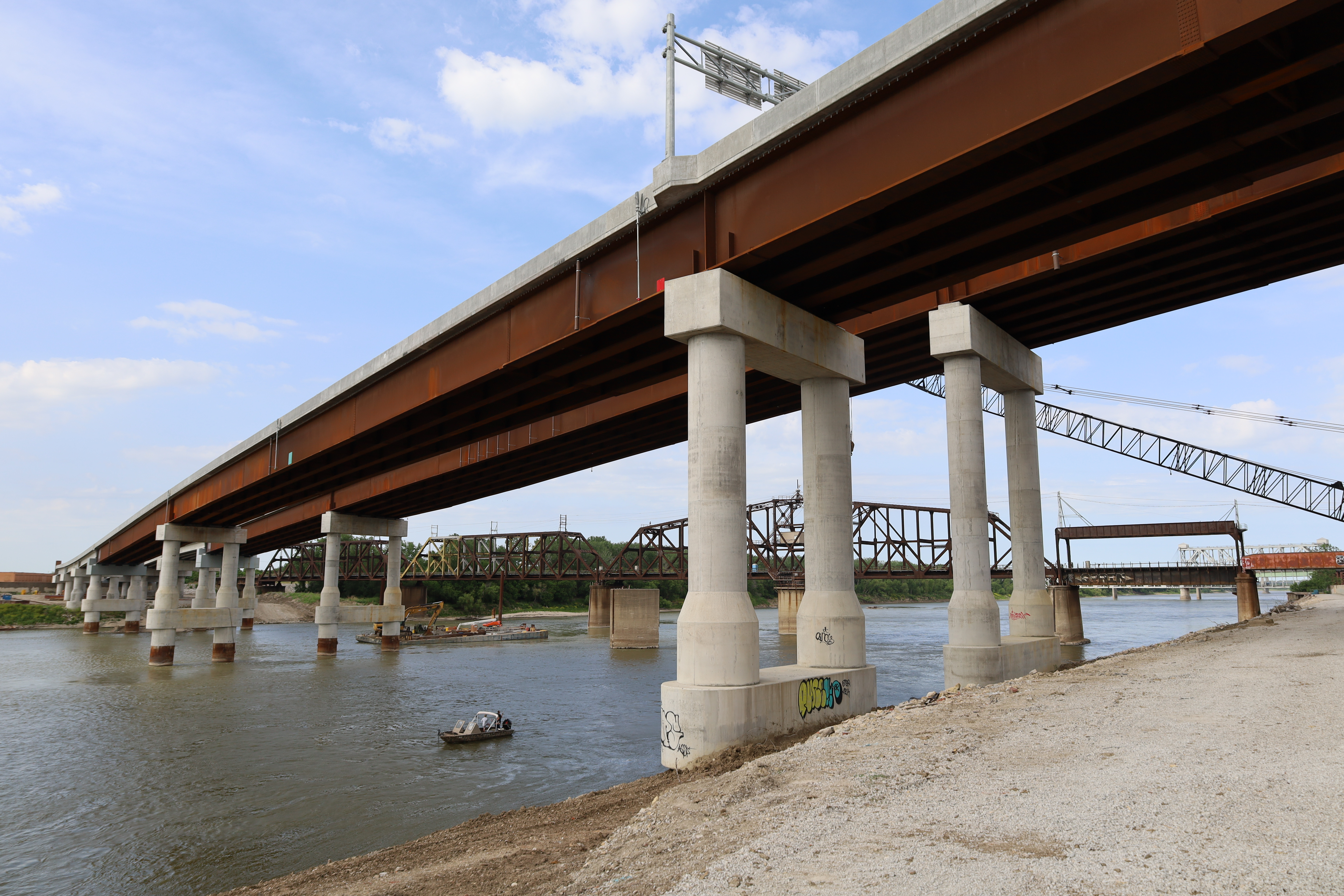
The bridge in 2025

The New Buck O'Neil Bridge is a beam bridge in Kansas City, Missouri. The bridge spans the Missouri River and connects Clay County, Missouri with Jackson County, Missouri. Construction on the bridge began in 2021 and was completed in December 2024.

The structure is the replacement for the now demolished Buck O'Neil Bridge. The bridge has a budget of $257 million, with some money from the federal government. The New Buck O'Neil Bridge is open to both north and southbound traffic as of December 2024. It is made of steel plate girders.
