= Interstate 635 Bridge =

- Coordinates: 39.0995°N 94.6799°W
- Carries: 6 lanes of Interstate 635
- Crosses: Kansas River
- Locale: Kansas City, Kansas
- Maintained by: KDOT

Characteristics
- Design: Girder

History
- Opened: 1976

Location
- Interactive map of Interstate 635 Bridge

The Interstate 635 Bridge is an automobile crossing of the Kansas River in Kansas City, Kansas. The bridge was built in 1976, and work to rebuild it started 2003, and finished by 2005. During the rebuild process, the bridge underwent repairs, was resurfaced, and the girder beams were replaced in some places.
