= Loutre Township, Montgomery County, Missouri =

Township in Montgomery County, Missouri, U.S.

Coordinates: 38.7636°N 91.5325°W

Loutre Township is an inactive township in Montgomery County, in the U.S. state of Missouri.

Loutre Township was established in 1818, taking its name from the Loutre River.
