= Buck O'Neil Bridge =

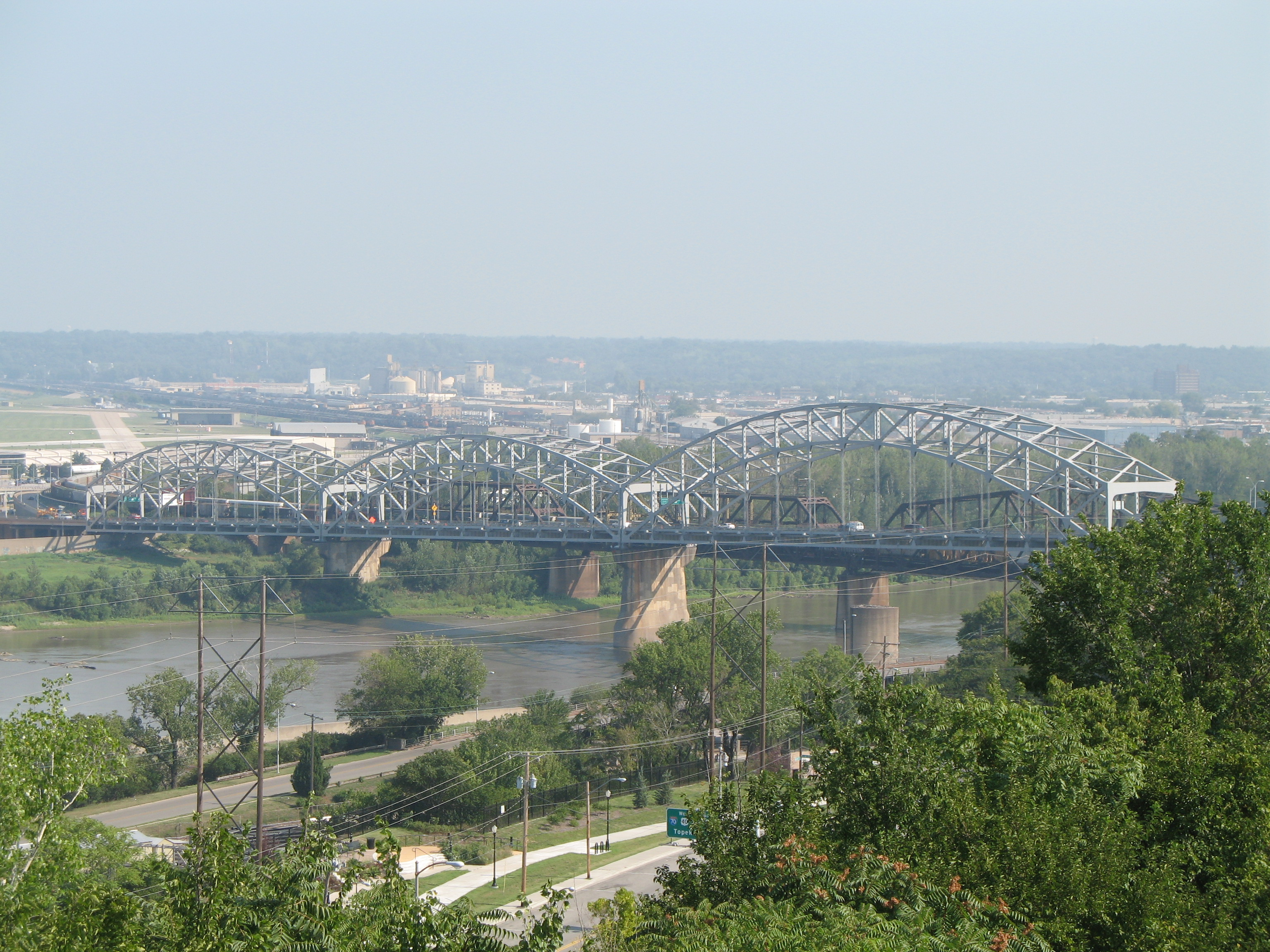
- Coordinates: 39.112475°N 94.589647°W
- Carries: US 169
- Crosses: Missouri River
- Locale: Kansas City, Missouri to North Kansas City, Missouri
- Official name: Buck O'Neil Bridge
- Other name: Broadway Bridge

Characteristics
- Design: Through arch bridge

History
- Opened: September 9, 1956

Location
- Interactive map of Buck O'Neil Bridge

The Buck O'Neil Bridge was a triple arch bridge that spanned the Missouri River in Kansas City, Missouri, in the United States. It first opened for traffic September 9, 1956 as the Broadway Bridge. It was built at a cost of $12 million. It was a toll bridge until 1991.

It replaced the Second Hannibal Bridge just to its east which had handled auto traffic on its upper level. In turn, the Buck O'Neil Bridge has now been replaced by the New Buck O'Neil Bridge.

It provided access from downtown Kansas City to the Charles B. Wheeler Downtown Airport and to the city of Riverside, Missouri.

U.S. Route 169, which the bridge carries across the river, never enters North Kansas City, Missouri, but skirts the western border.

On June 24, 2016, the Bridge was officially renamed from the Broadway Bridge to the Buck O'Neil Bridge named after the Kansas City Monarchs player and manager John Jordan "Buck" O'Neil.

On May 18, 2018, MoDOT began construction on the Buck O'Neil Bridge, with plans to repair the expansion joints, cable keep replacements and partial scour remediation. The project was expected to last until December at a cost of $7 million.

On January 29, 2024, the new Buck O'Neil Bridge opened to northbound traffic. Major demolition of the original 1956 bridge began on February 15, 2024, with the northern span being brought down with explosives.

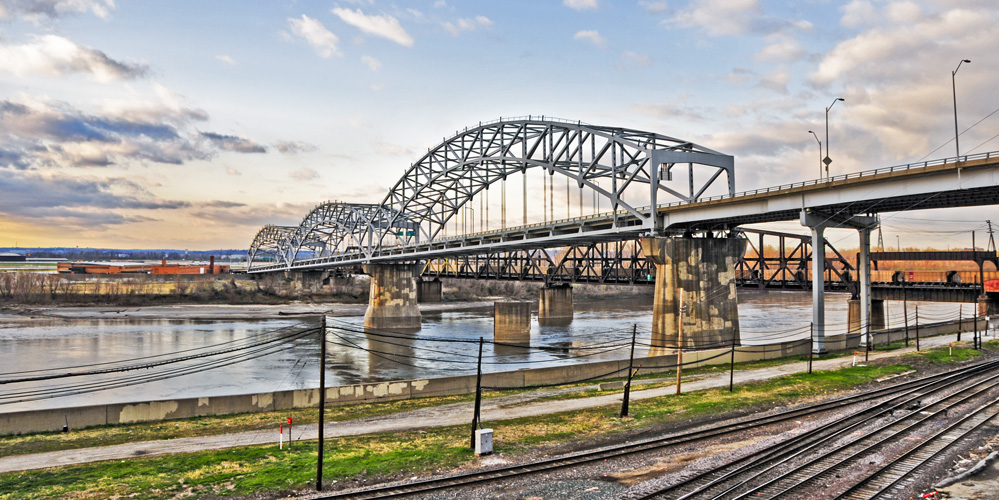
Buck O'Neil Bridge in Kansas City.

== See also ==
- List of crossings of the Missouri River
