= Eugene Township, Carroll County, Missouri =

Township in Carroll County, Missouri, U.S.

Eugene Township, Missouri
- Township
- Location of Eugene Township, within Carroll County, Missouri
- Coordinates: 39.3089°N 93.3556°W
- Country: United States
- State: Missouri
- County: Carroll

Area
  - Total: 51.51 sq mi (133.4 km^{2})
  - Land: 49.64 sq mi (128.6 km^{2})
  - Water: 1.88 sq mi (4.9 km^{2})

Population (2020)
  - Total: 120
  - Density: 2.4/sq mi (0.93/km^{2})
- Time zone: UTC-6 (Central (CST))
  - Summer (DST): UTC-5 (CDT)
- GNIS feature ID: 766410

Eugene Township is a township in Carroll County, in the U.S. state of Missouri. Eugene Township has a population of 120 according to the 2020 census.

The source of the name Eugene is obscure.
