= Lexington Township, Lafayette County, Missouri =

Inactive township in the U.S. state of Missouri

Coordinates: 39.1422°N 93.8472°W

Lexington Township is an inactive township in Lafayette County, in the U.S. state of Missouri.

Lexington Township was established in 1824, taking its name from the community of Lexington, Missouri.
