= Christopher S. Bond Bridge (Hermann, Missouri) =

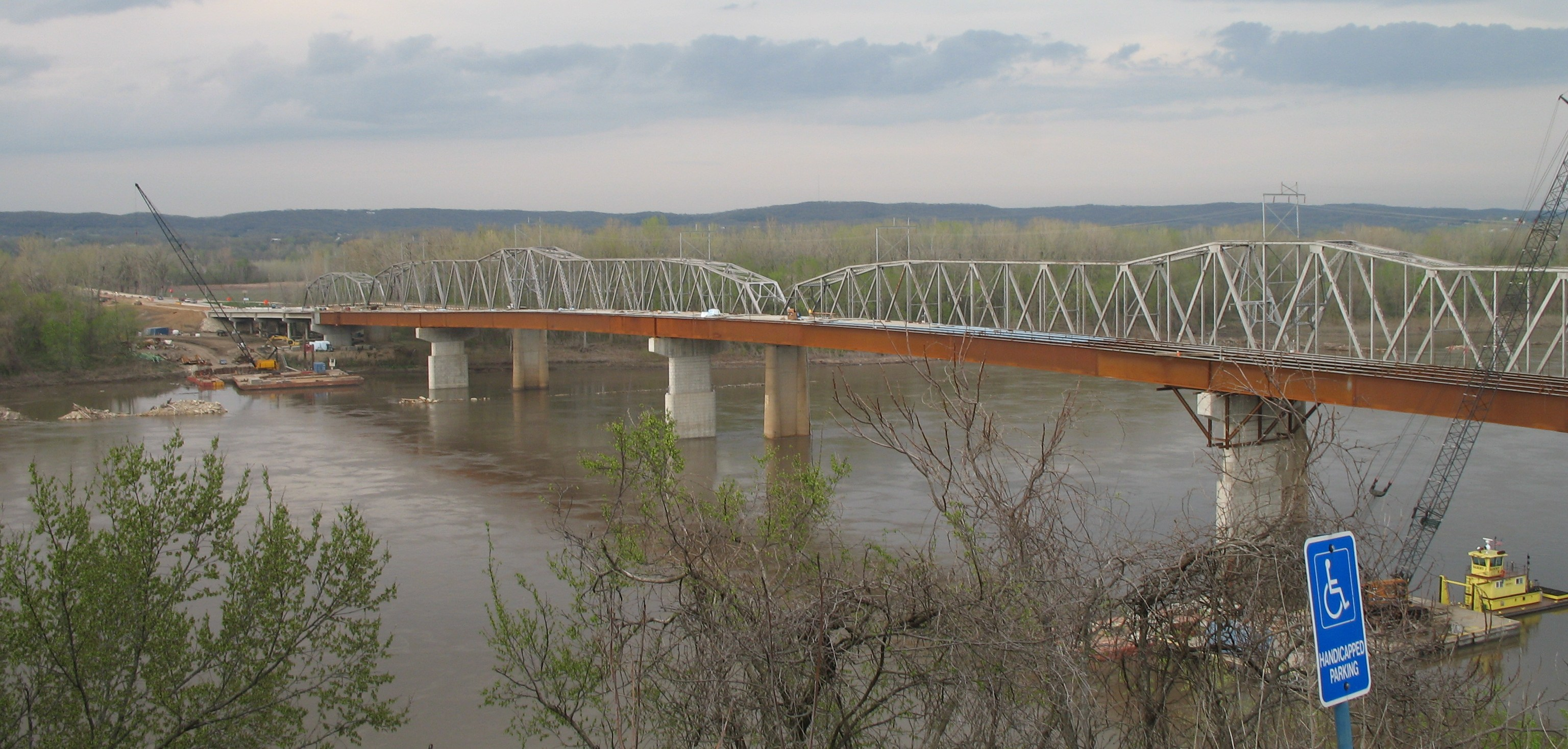
- Hermann Bridge with the new Christopher Bond bridge construction in the foreground from the southwest bank in March 2007
- Coordinates: 38°42′35″N 91°26′20″W
- Carries: 2 lanes of Route 19 and a dedicated bike/pedestrian way
- Crosses: Missouri River
- Locale: Hermann, Missouri
- Official name: Senator Christopher S. Bond Bridge
- Maintained by: MoDOT

Characteristics
- Total length: 2,247 feet (685 m)
- Width: 55 feet 4 inches (17 m)

History
- Opened: July 23, 2007; 17 years ago

The Christopher S. Bond Bridge is a highway bridge crossing the Missouri River at Hermann, Missouri. The bridge was opened to vehicle traffic on July 23, 2007, replacing an adjacent span opened in 1930. Florence Mundwiller Kelley, who cut the ribbon for the old Hermann bridge when she was 10 years old, also got to cut the ribbon for the new bridge.

The bridge consists of two 12-foot driving lanes, two 10-foot shoulders, and an 8-foot bicycle/pedestrian lane. The bike lane, which was opened in 2008 after approach construction and demolition of the previous bridge was completed, improved access between the town and the nearby Katy Trail State Park.

The bridge is named after Christopher "Kit" Bond, former Missouri United States Senator, and was officially dedicated October 12, 2007.
