= Discovery Bridge (Missouri) =

Discovery Bridge St Louis/St Charles Counties
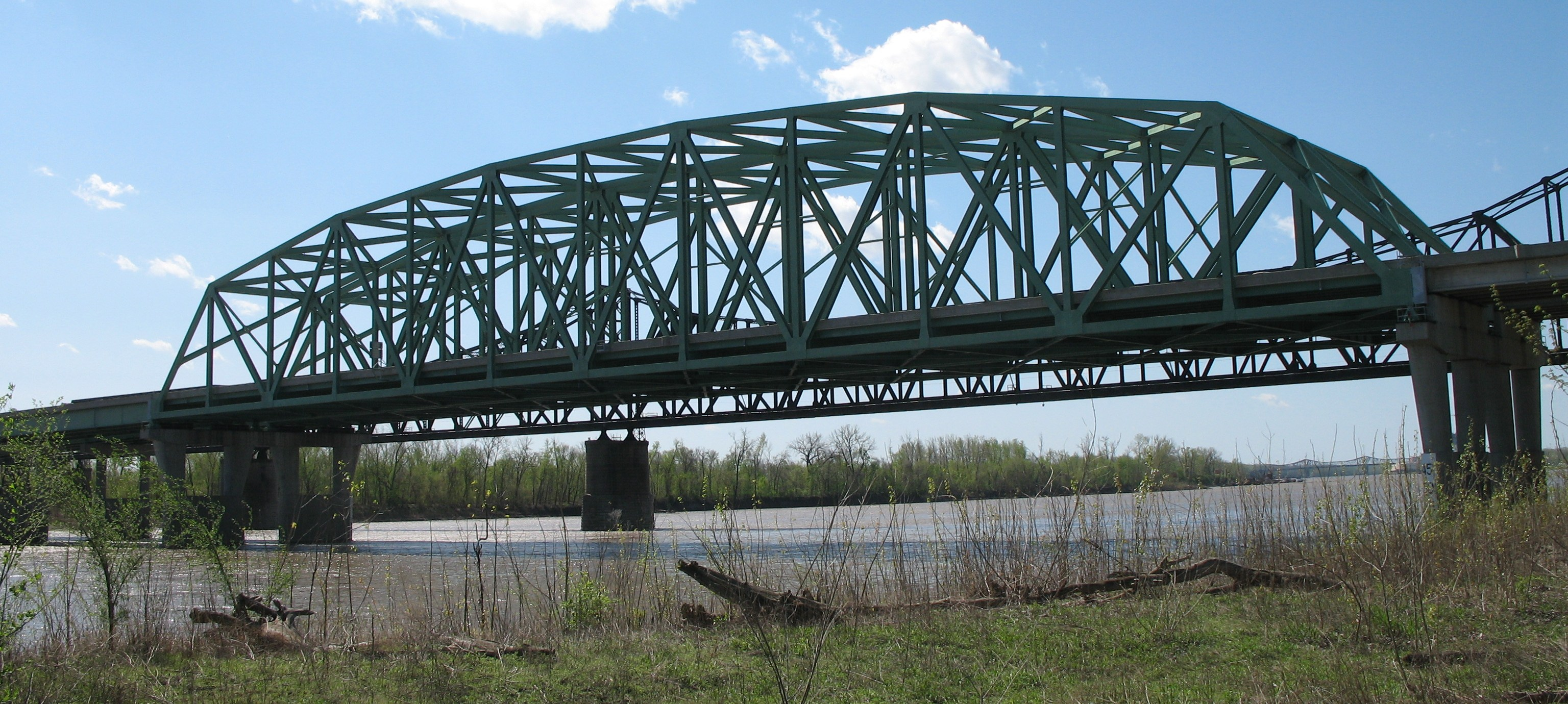
- Coordinates: 38.798°N 90.467°W
- Carries: 6 lanes of Route 370
- Crosses: Missouri River
- Locale: St. Louis County and St. Charles County in Missouri, U.S.
- Maintained by: Missouri Department of Transportation

Characteristics
- Design: Truss
- Total length: 1,053 m (3,455 ft)
- Width: 16.8 m (55 ft)
- Longest span: 190.5 m (625 ft)

History
- Opened: December 1992

Statistics
- Daily traffic: 62,490 (2008)

Location
- Interactive map of Discovery Bridge St Louis/St Charles Counties

The Discovery Bridge is a pair of truss bridges carrying Missouri Route 370 across the Missouri River between St. Louis County and St. Charles County, in the U.S. state of Missouri. The bridge was built between 1989 and 1992. Massman Construction built the river substructure and erected the steel girders. The St Charles pier is founded on rock. Piers 2-4 are supported by 6' diameter drilled shafts. Pier 5 on the St Louis County side is founded on Hp14-117 piling. The two trusses were fabricated by Stupp Brothers and erected approximately 500' downstream on falsework and floated into their final position after their transfer to barges. The land approaches substructure and concrete girders were built by Fred Weber. The entire deck was built by Kozney Wagner.

A barrier-separated bicycle and pedestrian path along the northeast side of the bridge opened in 2020. Separate bicycle/pedestrian access ramps are available immediately on both ends of the bridge. This provides a connection to and from the Katy Trail, which passes under the bridge.

Before the separated path opened, the shoulder on both sides was designated a bicycle and pedestrian path. The bicycle lane and shoulders were converted into an extra travel lane in each direction in November 2011 due to the rehabilitation of the westbound Blanchette (I-70) Bridge and the bridge was closed for bicycle and pedestrian use. The alternative river crossing was the Veterans Memorial (Page Ave) Bridge, adding about 15 miles' distance to trips involving a river crossing. The bicycle/pedestrian lanes reopened in May 2014.

== See also ==
- List of crossings of the Missouri River
