= Martin Luther King Bridge (St. Louis) =

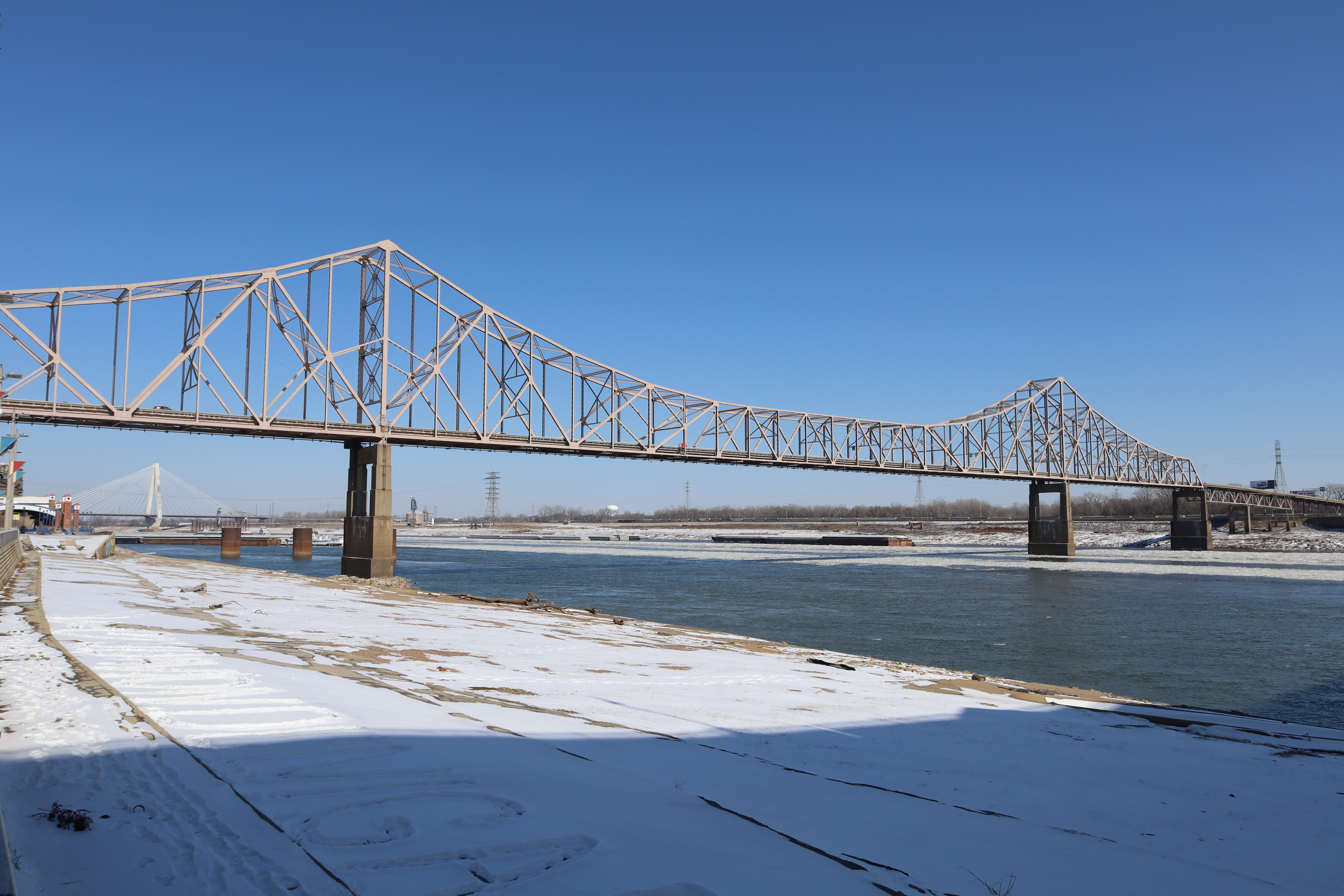
- The bridge in 2025
- Coordinates: 38°37′52″N 90°10′46″W
- Carries: 3 lanes (1 westbound and 2 eastbound) of Route 799
- Crosses: Mississippi River
- Locale: St. Louis, Missouri, and East St. Louis, Illinois
- Other name: Veterans Bridge
- Maintained by: Illinois Department of Transportation

Characteristics
- Design: Cantilever bridge
- Total length: 4,009 ft (1,222 m)
- Width: 40 ft (12 m)
- Longest span: 962 ft (293 m)
- Clearance above: 19.4 ft (6 m)
- Clearance below: 98 ft (30 m)

History
- Opened: 1951; 75 years ago
- Closed: October 2018—August 19, 2020

Statistics
- Daily traffic: 12,700 (2014)

Location
- Interactive map of Martin Luther King Bridge

The Martin Luther King Bridge (formerly known as the Veterans Bridge) in Greater St. Louis, is a cantilever truss bridge of about 4,000 feet (1,200 m) in total length across the Mississippi River, connecting St. Louis with East St. Louis, Illinois. Opened in 1951, the bridge serves as traffic relief connecting the concurrent freeways of Interstate 55, Interstate 64, and U.S. Route 40 with the downtown streets of St. Louis. It was renamed for King in 1968 after the national civil rights leader was assassinated that year.

== History ==
The bridge was built across the Mississippi River in 1951 as the Veterans' Memorial Bridge to relieve congestion on the MacArthur Bridge to the south. Built as a toll bridge, it was owned by the City of East St. Louis. At one time, it carried U.S. Route 40 and U.S. Route 66 across the river. In 1967, the bridge fell into disrepair after the (free) Poplar Street Bridge was completed; traffic moved to the new bridge, resulting in declining toll revenues needed for maintenance. In the 21st century, it is considered an important contributor to satisfying the transportation needs of the region and enhancing the ambiance of the historic St. Louis riverfront.

Eventually, ownership was transferred dually to the Missouri and Illinois departments of transportation. The bridge was renamed after Martin Luther King Jr. in 1968, after the national civil rights leader's April 1968 assassination in Memphis, Tennessee.

In 1987, the states removed the toll for travel across the bridge.

A bi-state project for about $24 million to renovate the bridge, at the behest of local civic and government leaders, was carried out in the late 1980s.

In the spring of 1989, the rebuilt bridge was reopened.

In June 1990, the lighting of the bridge was completed by the St. Louis Port Authority.

On October 12, 2009, the bridge was closed in order to reduce the old four-lane configuration down to three wider lanes, install a waterproofing membrane over the bridge surface, and to install a concrete barrier to separate eastbound traffic from westbound. Over the previous six years, there had been 38 serious accidents, including several involving fatalities. The $1.4 million project was aimed at eliminating these head-on collisions in the future. The bridge re-opened on October 21, 2009.

After the new Stan Musial Veterans Memorial Bridge opened in February 2014 across the river, daily traffic volume on the King bridge had decreased by 40% by April 2014 to 12,700 daily. This was one of the goals of construction of the new bridge: to distribute traffic more widely among the bridges and associated roadways, improving traffic patterns.

In October 2018, the bridge was closed to all traffic to allow an extensive rehabilitation project to take place. Among other things, this project would replace the deck surface and put a fresh coat of pavement on the roadway, as well as replacing the extensively deteriorated eastern approach spans, and repainting the entire bridge. The bridge was originally expected to reopen to traffic in January 2019. However, due to flooding, the date of reopening was pushed to summer of 2020. The bridge eventually reopened on August 19, 2020.

== Gallery ==
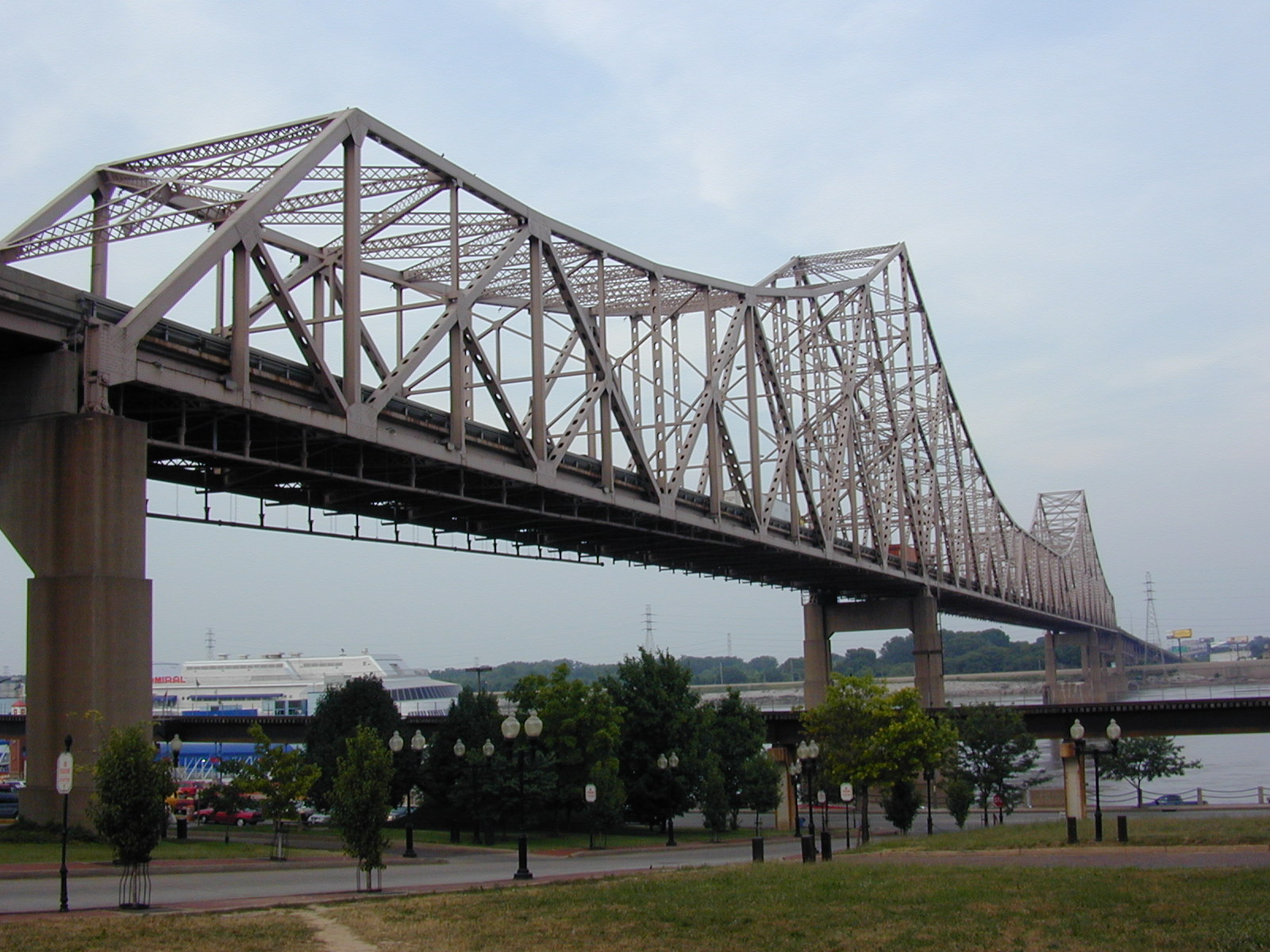
The bridge in 2004

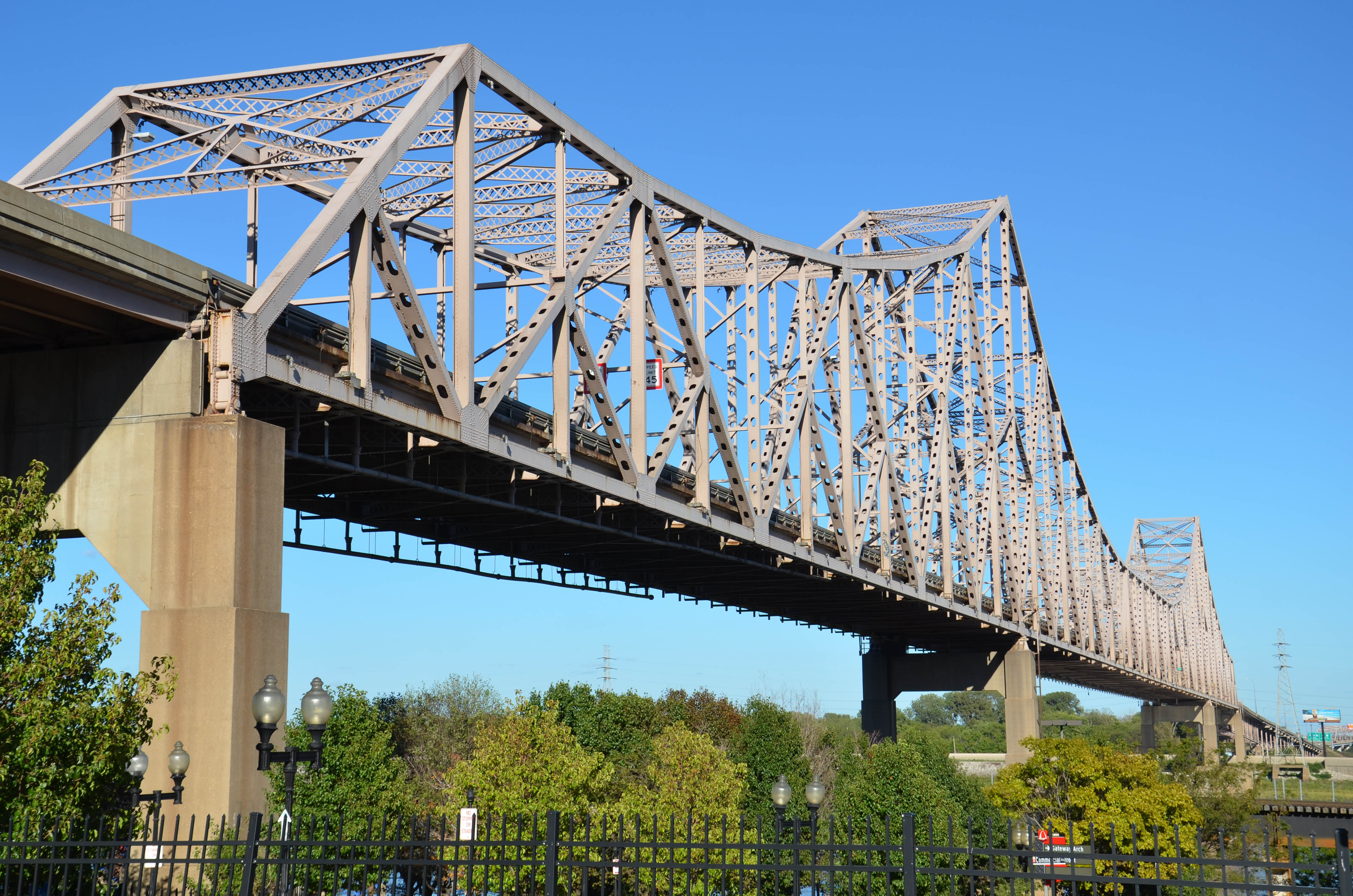
The bridge in 2012

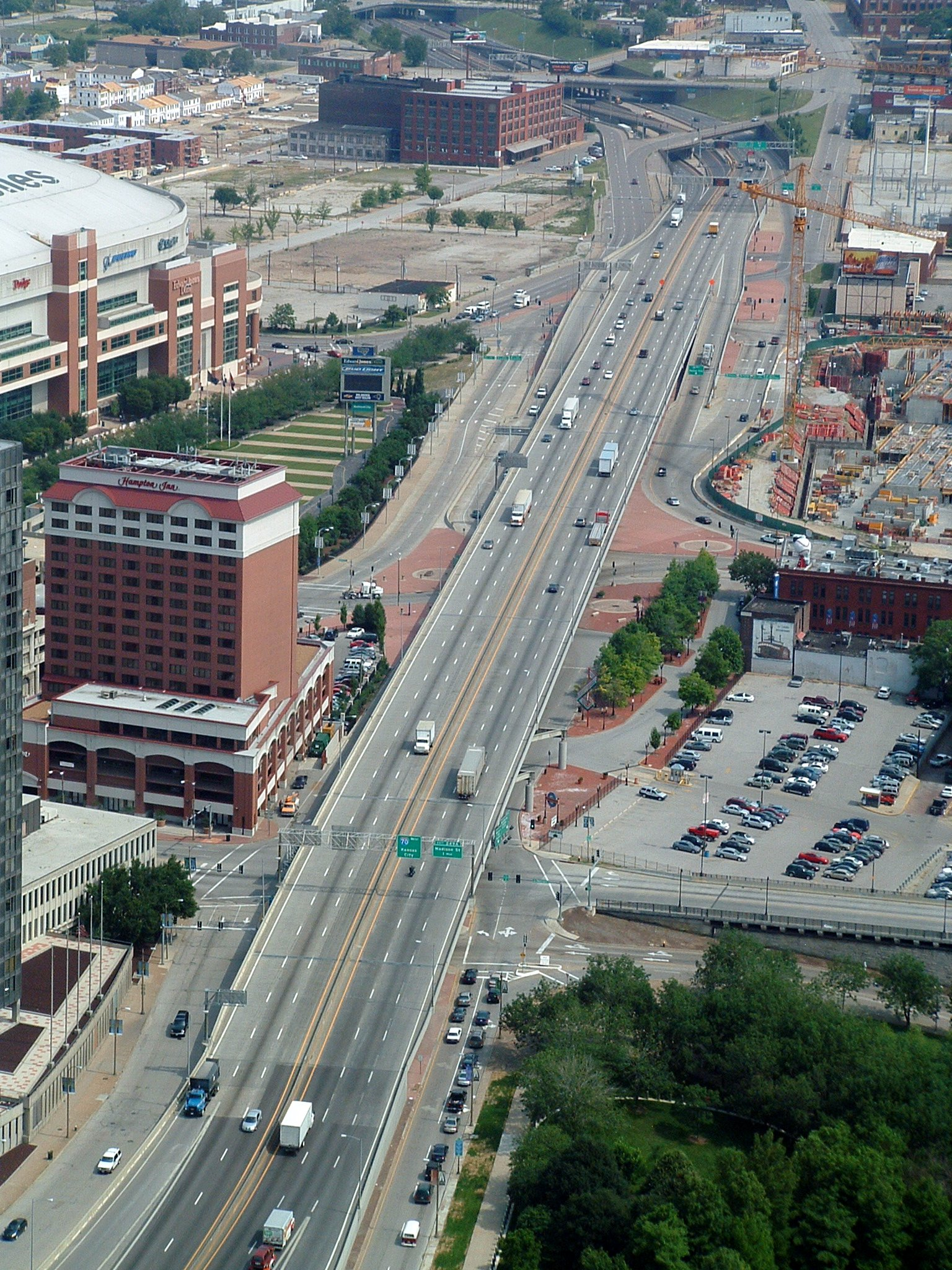
The interchange between Interstate 44 and the bridge, in the middleground

== Route 799 ==
Route 799
- Location: Illinois state line to I-44 in St. Louis
- Length: 0.5 mi (800 m)

The bridge is designated as Missouri Route 799 and spans roughly 0.5 miles across the Mississippi River.

It acts as a connector, bringing traffic from Missouri towards I-55/64 and Illinois Route 3.

Browse numbered routes
← Route 765	799	→ Route 1

== See also ==
- List of crossings of the Upper Mississippi River
- McKinley Bridge
- Eads Bridge
- Stan Musial Veterans Memorial Bridge
