= Stan Musial Veterans Memorial Bridge =

Bridge in Greater St. Louis, between Illinois and Missouri

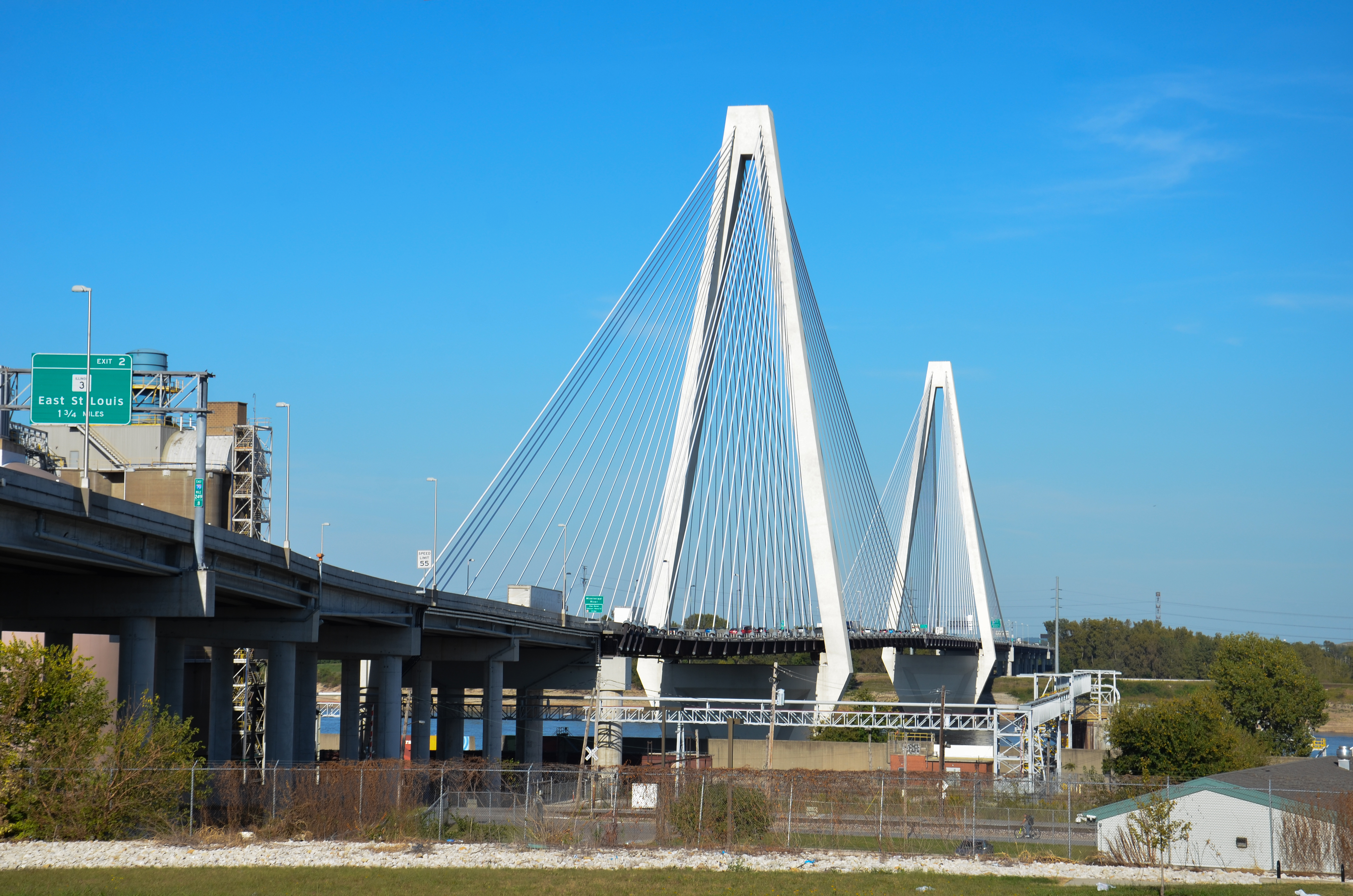
- Stan Musial Veterans Memorial Bridge as seen from the Big Mound.
- Coordinates: 38°38′40″N 90°10′42″W
- Carries: 4 lanes of I-70, expandable to 6
- Crosses: Mississippi River
- Locale: St. Louis, Missouri and St. Clair County, Illinois
- Official name: Stan Musial Veterans Memorial Bridge
- Maintained by: Missouri Department of Transportation

Characteristics
- Design: Cable-stayed bridge
- Total length: 2,803 feet (854 m)
- Width: 102 feet (31 m)
- Longest span: 1,500 feet (457 m)
- Clearance below: 75 feet (23 m)

History
- Designer: HNTB Corporation
- Construction cost: $695 mil.
- Opened: February 9, 2014; 12 years ago 12:00 p.m.
- Inaugurated: February 8, 2014; 12 years ago

Statistics
- Daily traffic: 53,700 cars and trucks

Location
- Interactive map of Stan Musial Veterans Memorial Bridge

The Stan Musial Veterans Memorial Bridge (informally known as the "Stan Span") is a bridge across the Mississippi River in the United States between St. Clair County, Illinois, and the city of St. Louis, Missouri. Built between April 19, 2010, and July 2013, the bridge opened on February 9, 2014. The cable-stayed bridge has a main span of 1,500 feet (460 m).

== Features ==
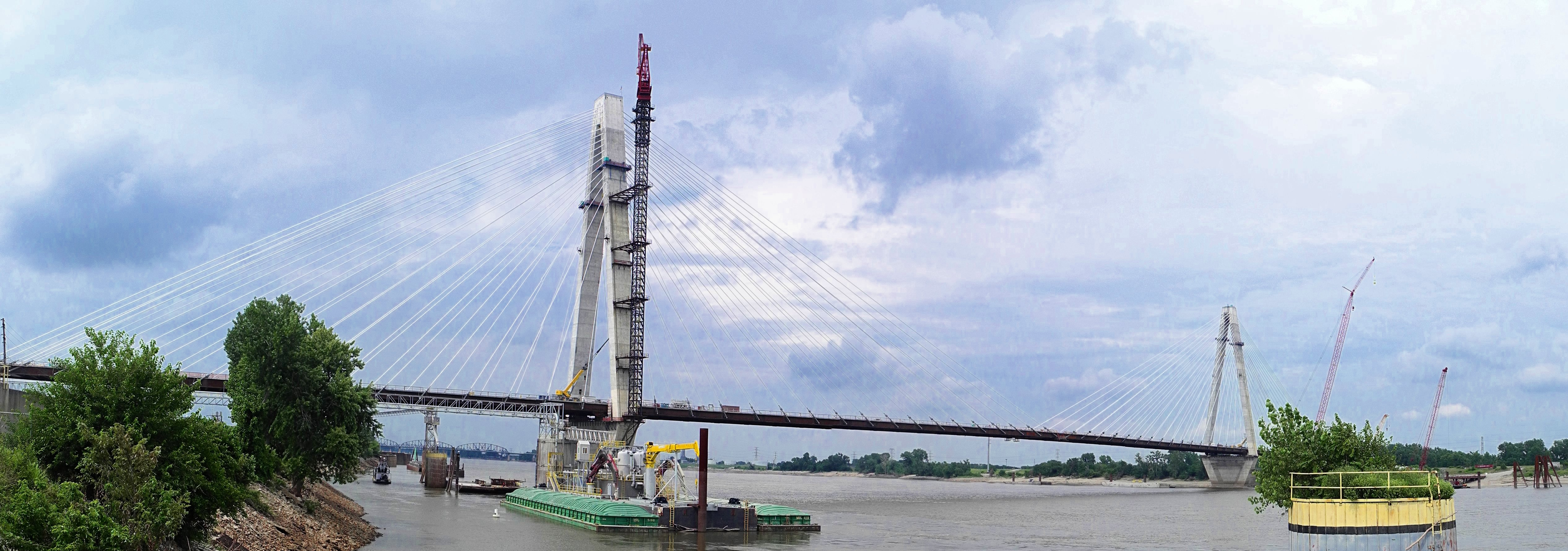
Spanning the river, still under construction, in July 2013

The main span of the bridge is 1,500 feet (460 m) in length, part of a total span of 2,803 feet (854 m). It is 86 feet (26 m) wide. Cables stretch from the bridge deck to the tops of two A-shaped towers, which reach 435 feet (133 m) above I-70. The new bridge's main span is supported by 1,000 miles (1,600 km) of 0.6-inch-diameter (1.5 cm) stay-cable strand, enough for nearly two round trips from St. Louis to Chicago. Nearly 15,000 tons of structural steel are used, along with 8,600 tons of reinforcing steel. Some 90,600 cubic yards (69,300 m^{3}) of concrete are in the foundation, deck slab, and towers. At its completion, the bridge was the third-longest cable-stayed bridge in the United States.

=== Traffic ===
The bridge was built to relieve traffic on nearby bridges and to expand in the future if traffic grows. It carries four main lanes, half as many as originally planned, but with room to add one lane in each direction. It is designed so that a companion bridge could be built beside it. Initially, the new bridge was intended to reduce traffic by 20% on the Poplar Street Bridge, which carries I-55, I-64, and US 40 (also the former route of I-70); and 50% on the Martin Luther King Bridge.

In May 2014, after three months of use, it was estimated that 31,000 cars and trucks crossed the bridge every day, about 10,000 less than the expected 40,000. Traffic volume on the nearby McKinley Bridge had not changed, while MLK Bridge traffic decreased 44%. The Eads Bridge was down 3,000 cars per day, a 27% decrease compared to 2013. The Poplar Street Bridge, the busiest in the area, saw by 20,000 fewer cars per day, a 19% decrease.

In 2017, after 3 1/2 years, daily traffic on the Musial bridge had increased to 53,700 vehicles, far more than the expected 40,000.

=== Road redesignations ===
At the bridge's opening, I-70 was re-routed, diverging from the current I-70 at Cass Avenue to connect with I-55/I-64/I-70 in East St. Louis. The remaining stretch of I-70 through downtown St. Louis became an extension of I-44. After these realignments, the Poplar Street Bridge continues to carry traffic for I-55, I-64 and US 40.

== Funding ==
=== Budget ===
The cost of the original design of the bridge and surrounding area was estimated at nearly $1.7 billion. After both state governments decided that they could not bear that cost, they called for a new design; this proposed a smaller size and was submitted in 2007 with an estimated cost of $667 million. Of the total, $264 million will go to move I-70 in Illinois, $57 million to move I-70 in Missouri, and $346 million to build the bridge. The Illinois state government plans to spend $313 million; Missouri, $115 million. A federal grant will cover the other $239 million. The final cost was $695 million.

=== Toll bridge proposal ===
The funding of the bridge project was debated by the Illinois and Missouri governments. After receiving the federal grant, Illinois pushed to start as soon as possible, but Missouri said it had more pressing highway projects to work on. Missouri transportation officials proposed to privatize the bridge, which would have allowed a private company to charge tolls in return for building, operating and maintaining it for up to 99 years. But Illinois officials and several St. Louis congressman demanded a toll-free crossing, and this was ratified by an agreement signed February 28, 2008, by Missouri governor Matt Blunt and Illinois governor Rod Blagojevich.

=== Bids ===
The cost of building the main span was initially estimated at $190 million. This proved low; a $229.5 million contract was awarded on December 30, 2009, to a joint venture of Massman Construction Co. of Kansas City, Traylor Bros. Inc. of Indiana and St. Louis-based Alberici Corp. (The team beat out the $274.9 million bid by a joint venture of American Bridge Co. and Dragados USA.) MoDOT agreed to cover any cost overruns.

== Design and construction ==
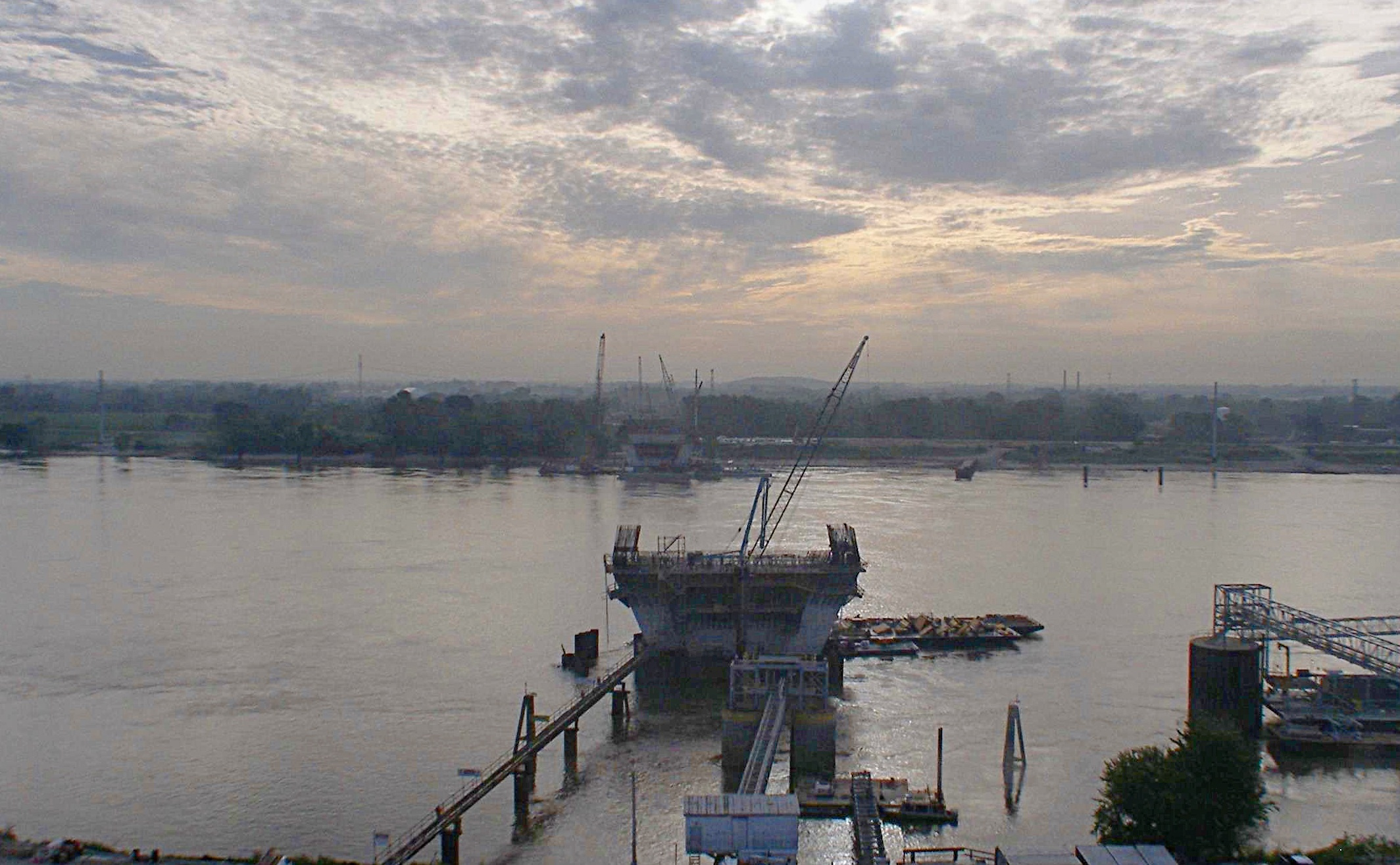
The bridge towers under construction, July 2011

Subsurface exploration by engineering firm Modjeski and Masters showed thick deposits of low-density sand below the water table. Such loose sand might liquefy during an earthquake. Several ways to reduce the risk were considered, including in-situ densification of the sands, but ultimately the foundations were changed to feature 12-foot-diameter (3.7 m), 120-foot-long (37 m) drilled piers founded in the limestone bedrock to support the bridge superstructure. The bedrock is 120 feet (37 m) below the surface on the Illinois side and between 30 and 60 feet (18 m) on the Missouri side.

=== Land sale ===
In 2003, land intended to be used for the bridge was sold by the City of St. Louis Land Reutilization Authority to a private developer for $2. In early 2008, MoDOT warned the developer not to build on it, but the developer completed the construction of 400 storage units. MoDOT offered a $1.7 million buyout, which the developer turned down. The property was condemned, and a circuit court ordered MoDOT to give the developer $2.3 million in compensation. MoDOT is contesting this amount.

=== Minority labor controversies ===
In August 2011, community leaders in East St. Louis, which suffers high unemployment, lodged complaints with the Illinois Department of Transportation that the bridge labor force included too few minority workers. Federal law requires that the labor force on any public works project that is fully or partially funded by federal dollars must be composed of at least 14.6% members of a recognized minority group. The project meets these requirements, according to contractor records; the activists argued that the labor force was not representative of those living in the region. A protest and work stoppage on the Illinois portion of the bridge was threatened, but work on the bridge continued.

Riley Illinois, a firm that is supplying concrete for the project, was de-listed as a minority-owned business when Illinois officials discovered that only one of the four owners of the firm was a minority. Though the company continued its contract to provide concrete for the bridge, it no longer counted as a minority-owned firm.

=== Construction accident ===
At 10:30 a.m. on March 28, 2012, carpenter Andy Gammon plunged to his death in the river when a barge-mounted lift toppled and a rescue effort failed. Gammon was working on pilings from a boom lift that was placed on a secured barge. The mobile piece of equipment was not secured to the barge and tipped over into the water, taking him in the boom with it. Gammon's body was found attached to the lift. OSHA cited the three general contractors and the subcontractor for three violations totalling $15,300. The stretch of I-70 from the bridge to I-44 is designated the Andy Gammon Memorial Highway.

== Naming ==
Before its formal naming in 2013, the bridge was referred to as the "New Mississippi River Bridge".

In August 2004, William Perkins and Russ Reike, members of the Veterans of Foreign Wars, gave Rep. Jerry Costello (D-IL) petitions with over 4,000 signatures supporting the naming of the new bridge "Veterans Memorial Bridge". There is a Veterans Memorial Bridge over the Missouri River. The Martin Luther King Bridge was originally called "Veterans Memorial Bridge" until it was renamed in 1968 following the assassination of the national civil rights leader. The naming proposal was supported by Rep. John Shimkus (R-IL) and Illinois Governor Pat Quinn. When the bridge was delayed by Missouri's postponement of funding, the petitions expired. Perkins and Reiki, joined by fellow VFW member Dave Stout, collected signatures again and in 2009 tuned over to Rep. Costello petitions with more than 13,000 names.

On August 28, 2005, the Missouri State Legislature voted to name the bridge after President Ronald Reagan.

In March 2011, the Missouri House of Representatives approved a proposal to change the name to "Jerry F. Costello–William Lacy 'Bill' Clay Sr. Veterans Memorial Bridge", for two prominent state politicians. One month later, the Missouri Senate Transportation Committee rejected the change.

Some groups pushed for "Women Veterans Memorial Bridge".

On January 22, 2013, Sen. Eric Schmitt (R-Glendale, Missouri) introduced a bill to name the bridge after Stan Musial, the former St. Louis Cardinals baseball player who had recently died. The measure required the approval of both houses of both the Illinois and Missouri legislatures. The measure received the first of two necessary approvals from the Missouri Senate on February 20, 2013. An amendment to the Musial bill, sponsored by Sen. Gary Romine (R-Farmington, Missouri), named the Missouri approach to the bridge the Andy Gammon Memorial Highway in honor of the bridge worker who died.

The two state legislatures agreed; the bridge was officially named the Stan Musial Veterans Memorial Bridge, with the signature of President Barack Obama on July 12, 2013.

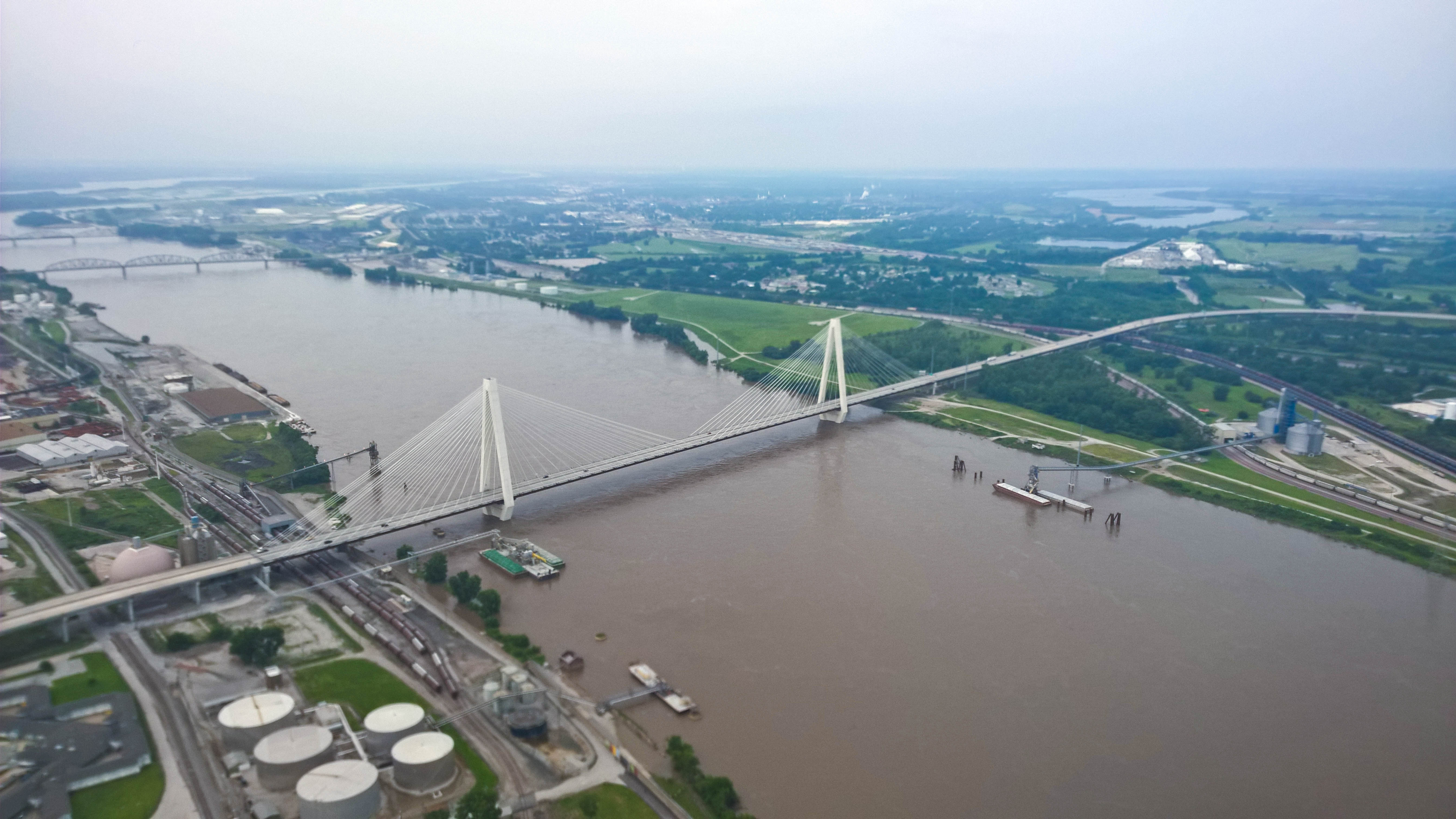
The completed Stan Musial Veterans Memorial Bridge
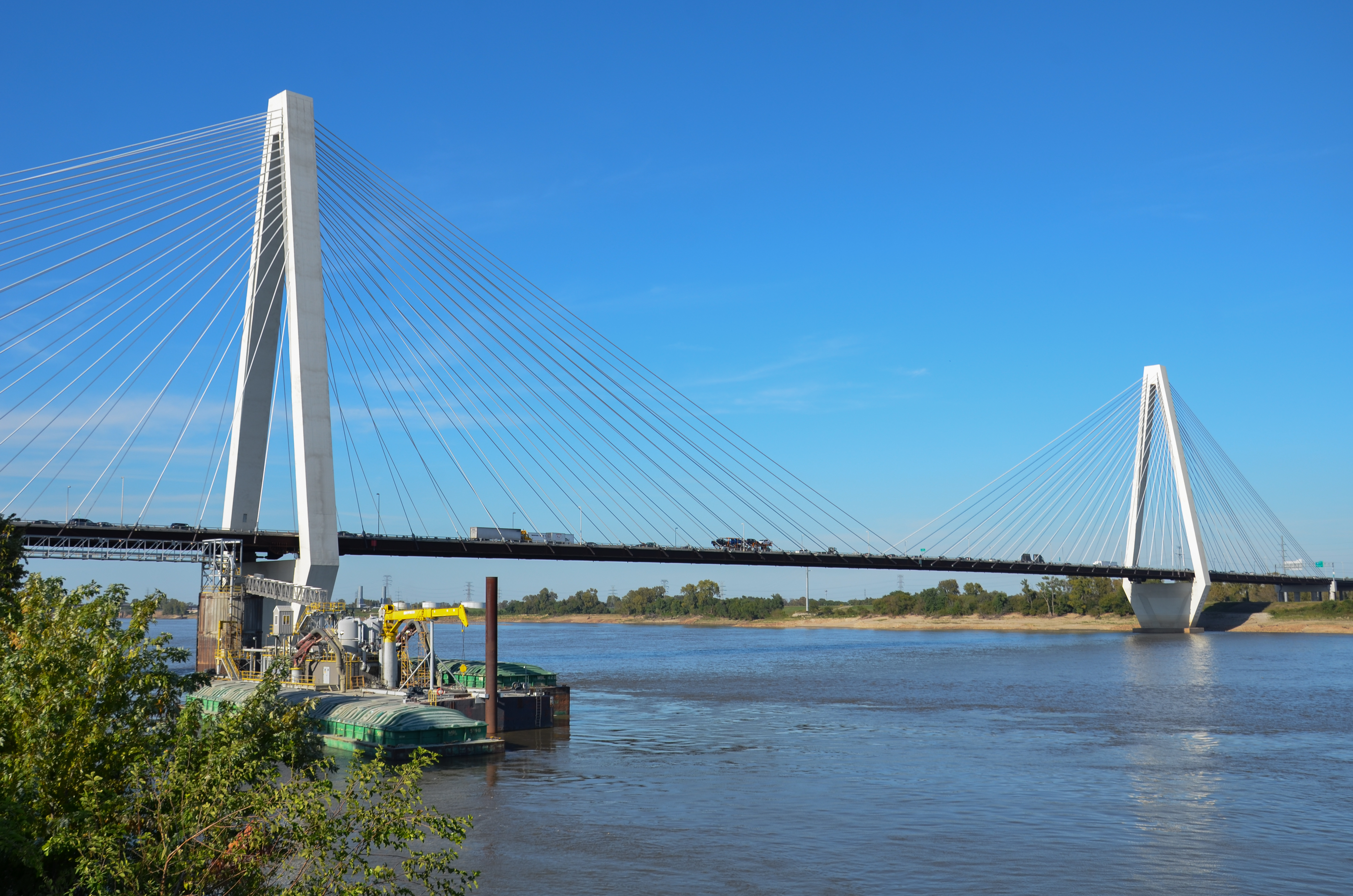
Stan Musial Veterans Memorial Bridge

== See also ==
- List of crossings of the Upper Mississippi River
- Eads Bridge
- Martin Luther King Bridge
- MacArthur Bridge
- McKinley Bridge
- Merchants Bridge
- Poplar Street Bridge
- Chain of Rocks Bridge
- Jefferson Barracks Bridge
