= Poplar Street Bridge =

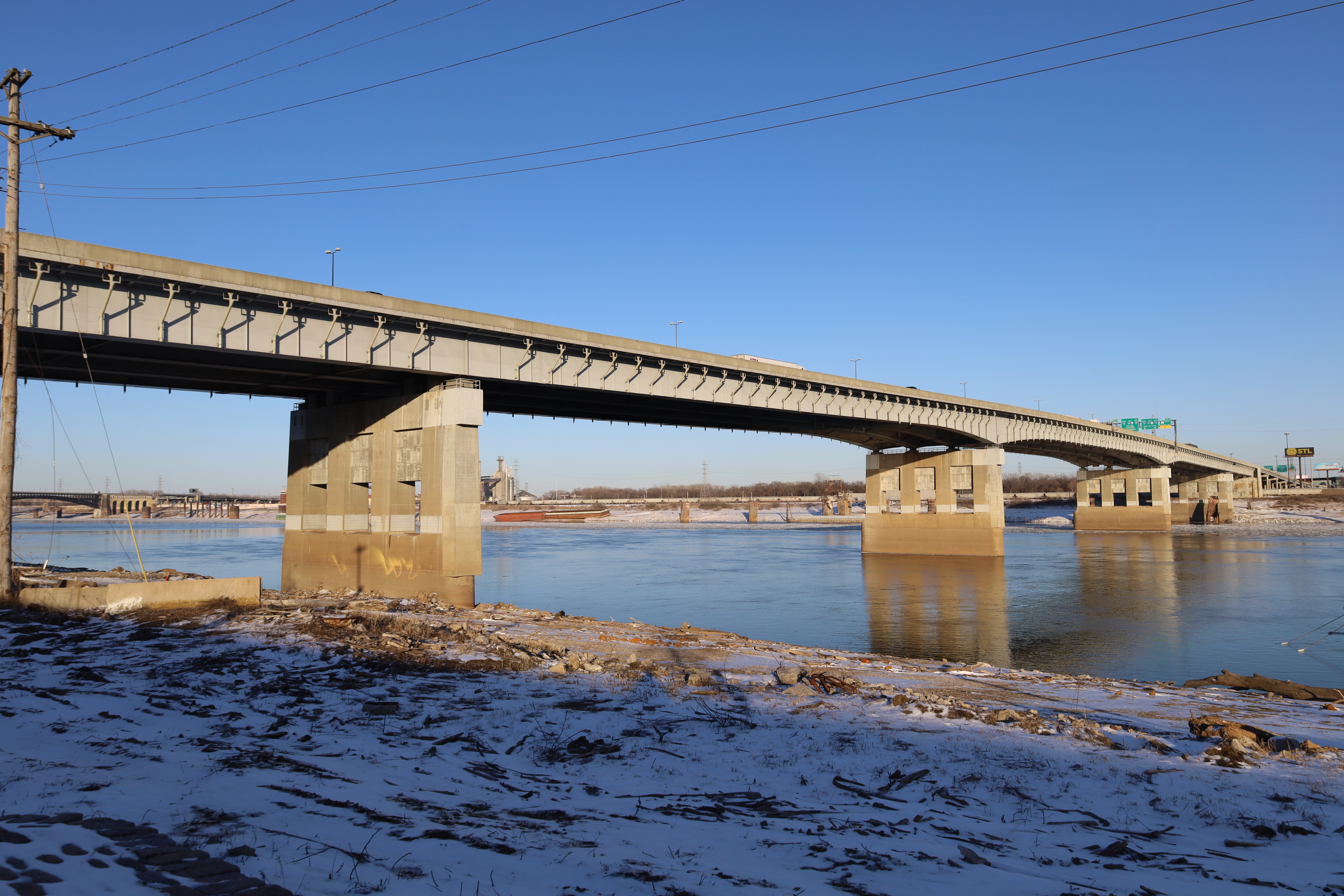
- The bridge in 2025
- Coordinates: 38°37′05″N 90°10′59″W
- Carries: 9 lanes of I-55 / I-64 / US 40
- Crosses: Mississippi River
- Locale: St. Louis, Missouri, and East St. Louis, Illinois
- Official name: Congressman William L. Clay Sr. Bridge
- Maintained by: Missouri Department of Transportation

Characteristics
- Design: Steel girder bridge
- Total length: 2,164 ft (660 m)
- Width: 104 ft (32 m)
- Longest span: 600 feet (183 m)
- Clearance below: 92 ft (28 m)

History
- Opened: 1967; 59 years ago

Statistics
- Daily traffic: 106,500 (2014)

Location
- Interactive map of Poplar Street Bridge

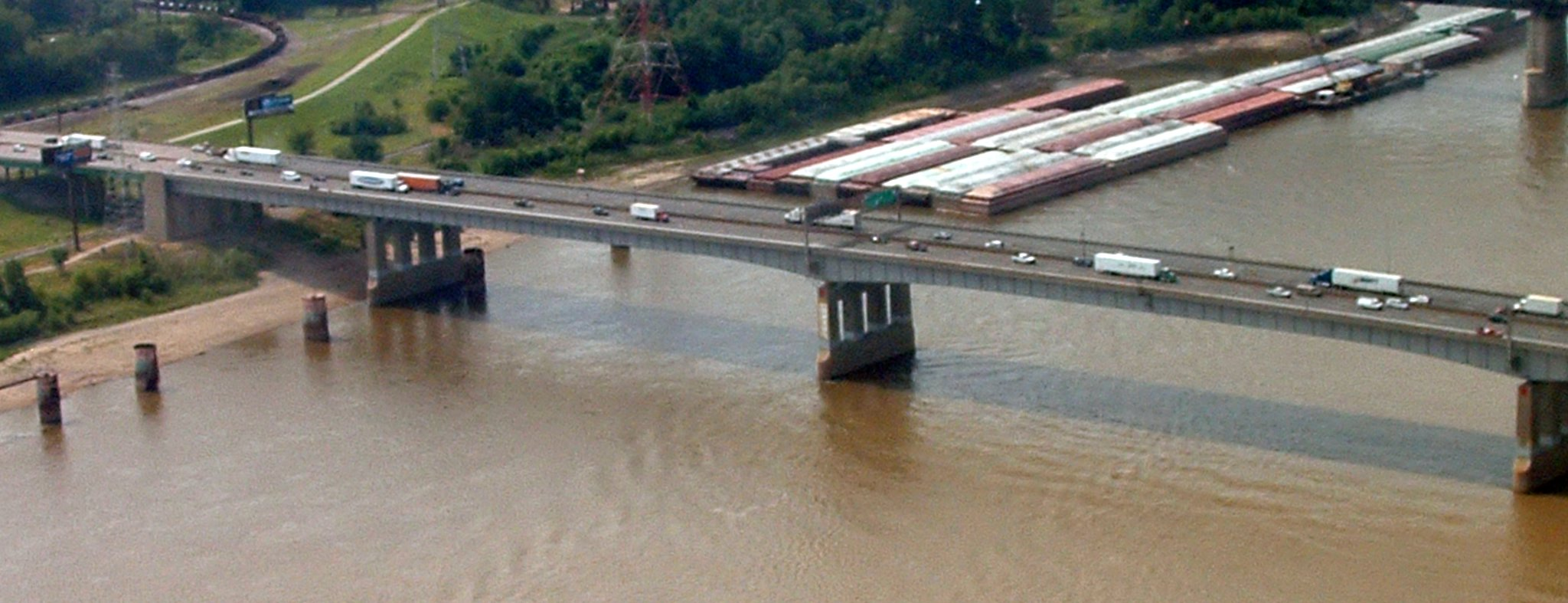
Aerial view in 2006

The Congressman William L. Clay Sr. Bridge, formerly known as the Bernard F. Dickmann Bridge and popularly as the Poplar Street Bridge or PSB, completed in 1967, is a 647-foot-long (197 m) deck girder bridge across the Mississippi River between St. Louis, Missouri, and East St. Louis, Illinois. The bridge arrives on the Missouri shore line just south of the Gateway Arch.

== History ==
Planned just before construction of the Arch, the builders in 1959 were to request that 25 acres (10 ha) of the Gateway Arch property be turned over from the National Park Service for the bridge. The request generated enormous controversy and ultimately 2.5 acres (1.0 ha) of the Jefferson Expansion National Memorial was given to the bridge.

The traffic was heavily congested until the opening of the new Stan Musial Veterans Memorial Bridge in early February 2014. In 2012, 123,564 vehicles used it every day, but after the new bridge opened, congestion alleviated by almost 14%, less than the predicted 20% decline with 106,500 vehicles using it every day because total traffic across the river from all bridges increased by 7.4% over 2013 levels.

== Description ==
Two Interstates and a U.S. Highway cross the entire bridge. Approximately 100,000 vehicles cross the bridge daily, making it the second most heavily used bridge on the river, after the I-94 Dartmouth Bridge in Minneapolis, Minnesota.

I-55, I-64 and U.S. Route 40 (US 40) cross the Mississippi on the Poplar Street Bridge. US 66 also ran concurrently over this bridge until 1979, and US 50 was routed over it before the Interstates were constructed.

In addition, I-70 crossed the river here until 2014, when it was realigned to cross the river on the Stan Musial Veterans Memorial Bridge when it was completed. With both I-55 and I-64 routed alongside I-70 prior to its rerouting onto the new bridge, the Poplar Street Bridge was the site of just (then) two three-route concurrencies within the Interstate Highway System, the other being that of I-39, I-90, and I-94 in Wisconsin between Portage and Madison.

The old alignment of I-70 through downtown to the west approach for the Stan Musial Veterans Memorial Bridge became an extension of I-44. However, motorists traveling eastbound on I-44 must continue westbound on I-70 and do not have a direct connection to the Stan Musial Veterans Memorial Bridge, while motorists traveling westbound on I-70 do not have a direct connection to I-44 westbound. Such access requires using I-55/I-64 across the Poplar Street Bridge, Westbound I-70 traffic must follow I-55/I-64 before Exit 3 on the Illinois side of the river to connect to I-44 westbound on the Missouri side, while eastbound I-44 traffic must exit onto I-55/I-64 on the Missouri side to connect to I-70 eastbound the Illinois side.

== Historical areas ==
The east end of the bridge crosses the south end of what was Bloody Island which Robert E. Lee connected to the mainland of Illinois with landfill in the 1850s. During its island days several Missouri politicians fought duels there. What was Bloody Island is now a train yard.

== Name ==
Although the bridge's former name honors former St. Louis mayor Bernard F. Dickmann, it is most commonly referred to as the Poplar Street Bridge, with many locals unaware of its official name. The Missouri end of the bridge sits over Poplar Street, and the media started referring to it by that name long before the bridge opened due to the fact that the bridge was built over Poplar Street.

It was officially renamed as the Congressman William L. Clay Sr. Bridge in October 2013 in honor of Bill Clay.

== See also ==
- List of crossings of the Upper Mississippi River
- McKinley Bridge
- Eads Bridge
- Martin Luther King Bridge
