= MacArthur Bridge (St. Louis) =

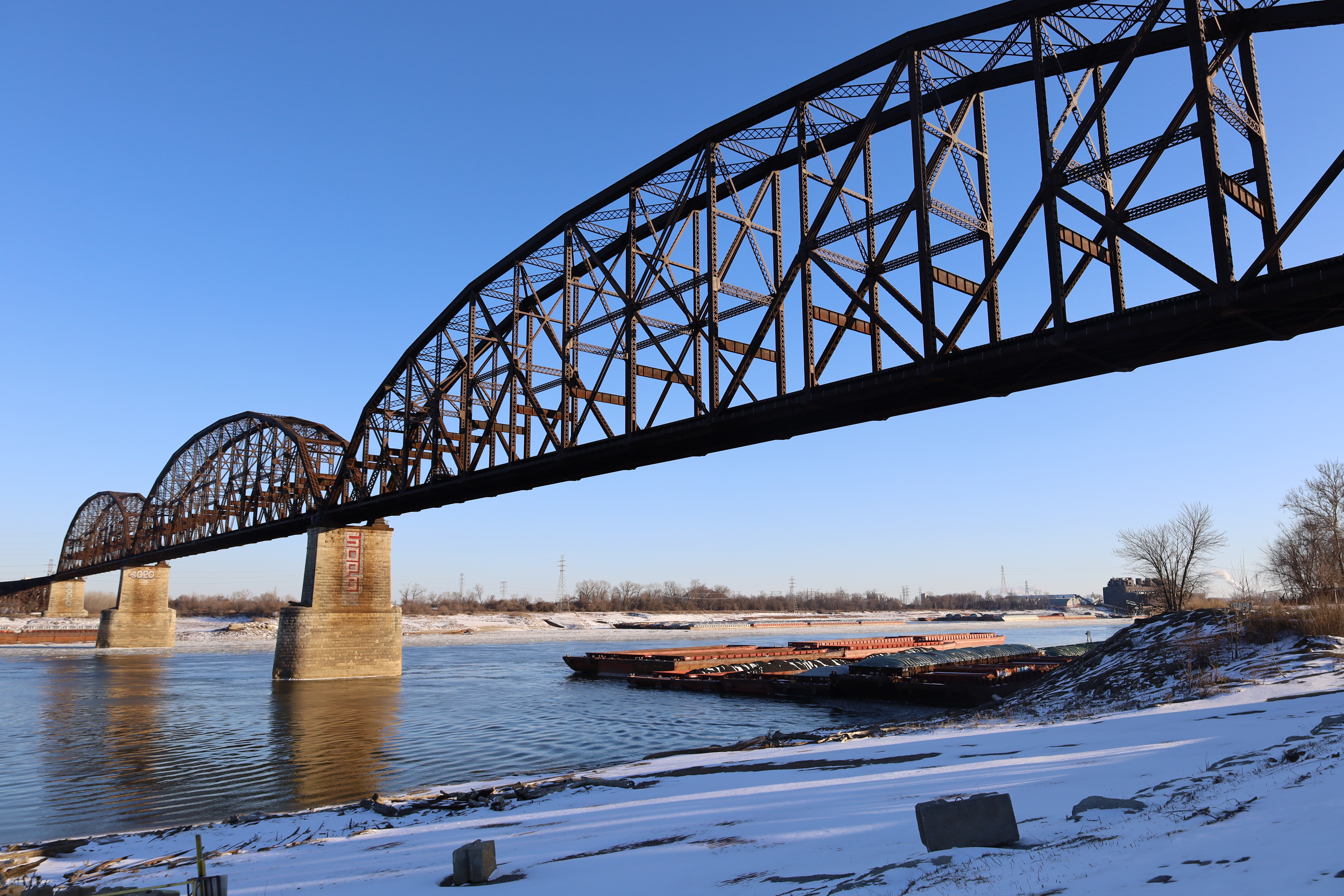
- The bridge in 2025
- Coordinates: 38°36′53″N 90°11′01″W
- Carries: Freight and passenger traffic Union Pacific, BNSF, Amtrak
- Crosses: Mississippi River
- Locale: St. Louis, Missouri and East St. Louis, Illinois
- Owner: Terminal Railroad Association of St. Louis

Characteristics
- Design: Truss bridge
- Total length: 18,261 feet (5,566 m)
- Longest span: 677 feet (206 m)
- Clearance below: 108 feet (33 m)

History
- Opened: 1917; 108 years ago
- Closed: 1981 (upper auto deck)

Statistics
- Daily traffic: 40 trains per day

The MacArthur Bridge is a truss bridge that connects St. Louis, Missouri, and East St. Louis, Illinois, over the Mississippi River. It originally had an upper vehicular roadway deck above the railroad deck, which was removed in stages between 1981 and the 2010s. A rehabilitation project is scheduled to be completed in 2026.

== History ==
=== Early history ===
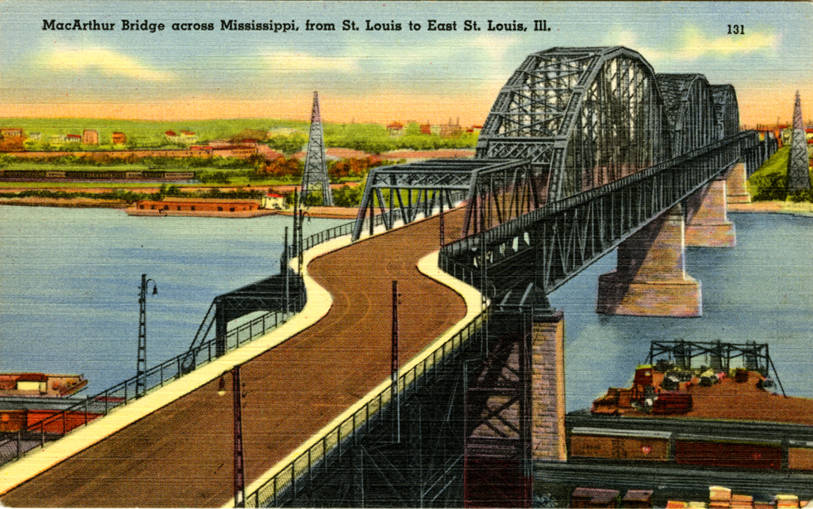
A mid-20th century Tichnor Brothers postcard of the bridge

The bridge was constructed to break the monopoly of the Terminal Railroad Association, which controlled two other bridges at St. Louis and charged what were viewed as unreasonable tolls.

Following a 1906 Congressional bill authorizing the City of St. Louis to build a new Mississippi River Bridge, bonds were issued for an initial amount of $3.5 million. Construction on the bridge began 1909, however, money ran out before the bridge approaches could be finished. This led to a second bond issuance of $2.75 million in 1914, and the bridge did not open until 1917, when it was first opened to automobile traffic. Railroad traffic would not use the bridge's lower deck until 1928.

The bridge was built by Missouri Valley Bridge & Iron Co. and American Bridge Company, with the design completed by Boller & Hodge. Upon completion, the structure was the largest double-deck steel bridge in the world.

The bridge was initially called the "St. Louis Municipal Bridge" and known popularly as the "Free Bridge" due to the original lack of tolls. Tolls were added for auto traffic beginning in 1932. In 1942, the bridge was renamed for Douglas MacArthur.

From 1929 through 1955, the MacArthur Bridge carried U.S. Highway 66 via Chouteau Avenue to 10th Street in East St. Louis until the completion of the nearby Poplar Street Bridge. From 1947 to 1974, U.S. Highway 460 crossed the bridge, terminating on the west side of the bridge.

=== Removal of roadway ===
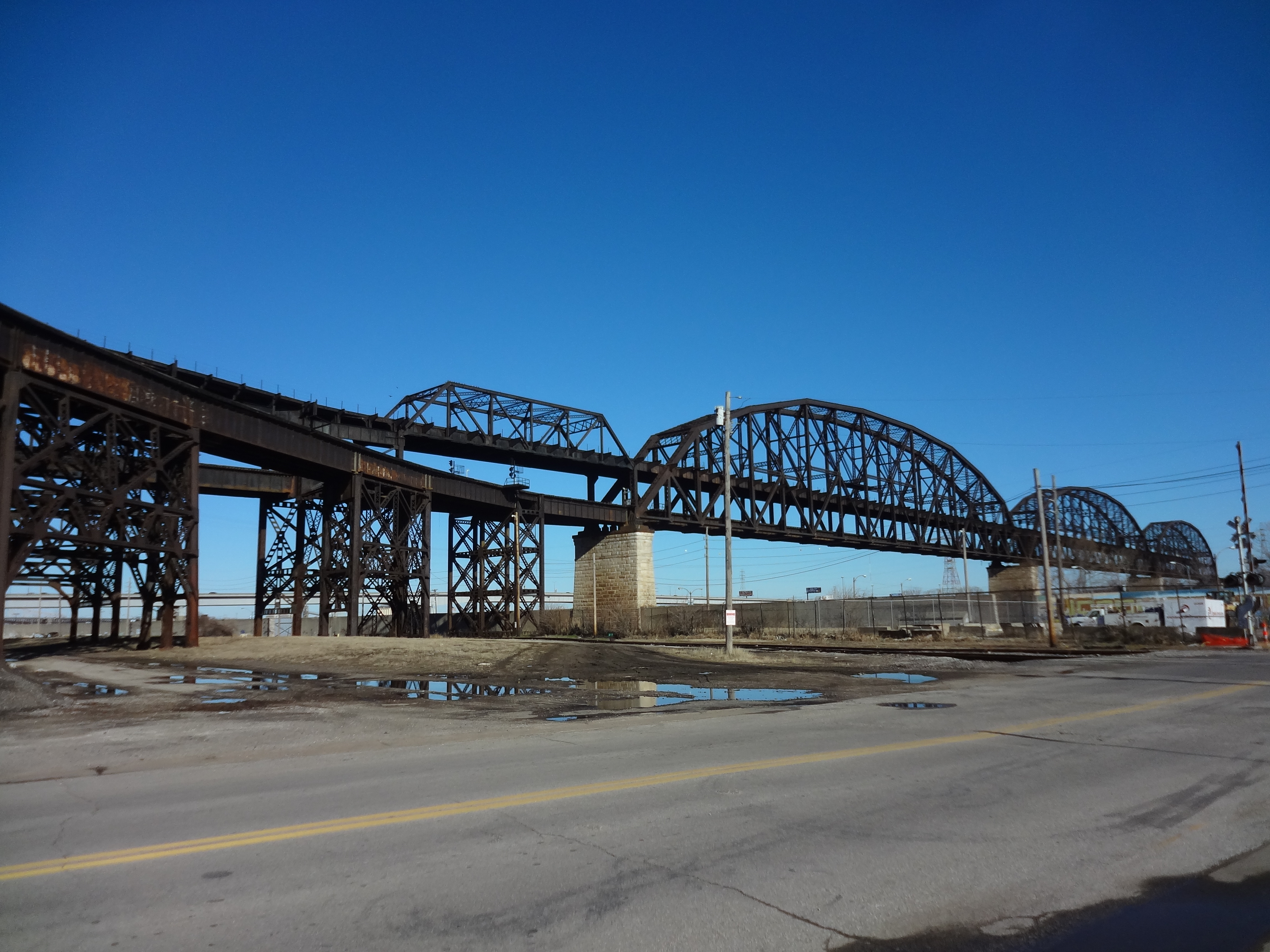
The bridge in its original configuration in January 2012. The upper deck, which carried a roadway, has since been removed.

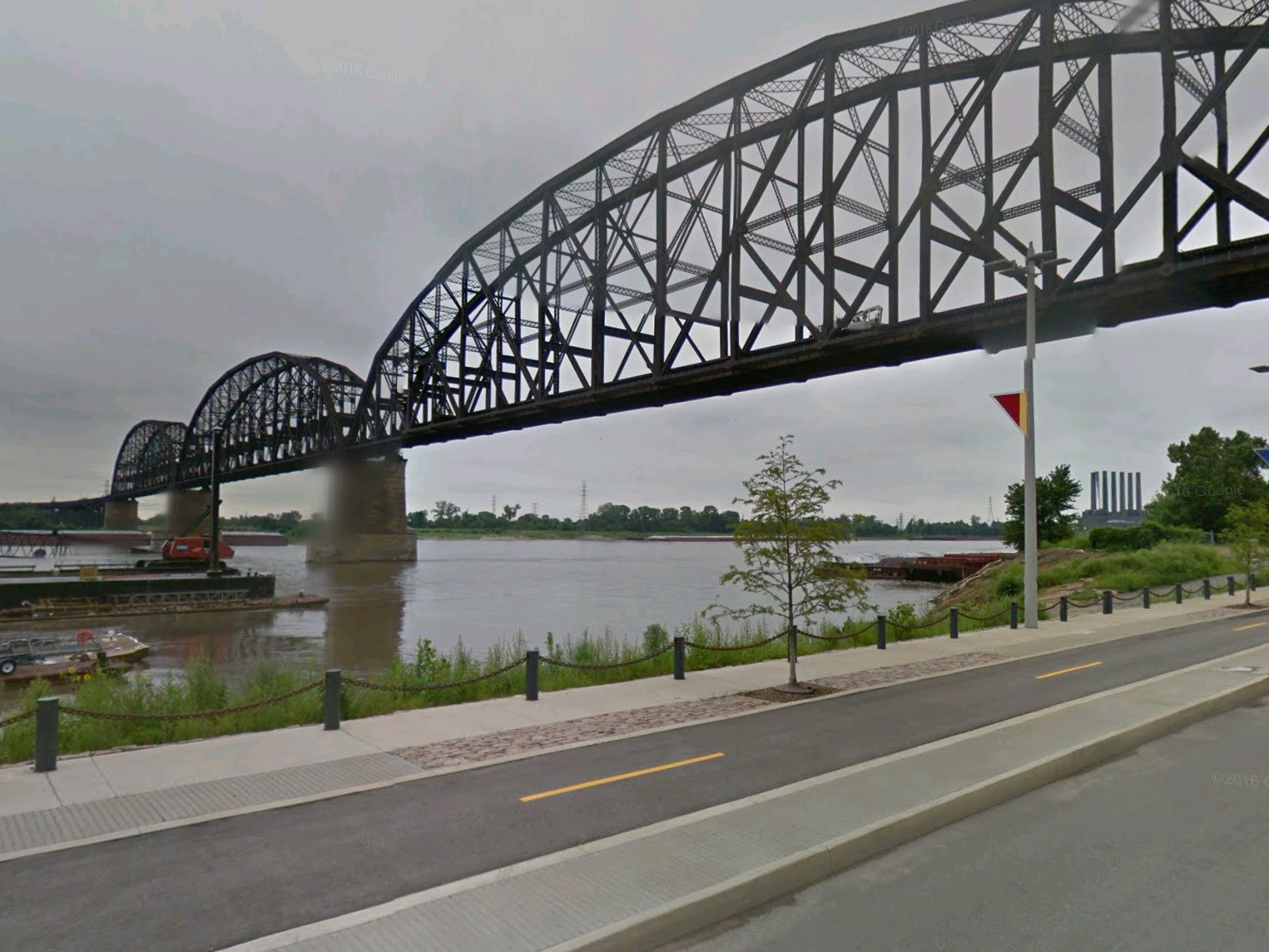
Removal of the roadway deck in progress

In 1981 the bridge was closed to vehicles because of pavement deterioration, and the eastern ramp approaches were torn out.

In 1989, the Terminal Railroad Association of St. Louis acquired the MacArthur Bridge from the City of St. Louis in exchange for the title to the Eads Bridge. The Eads bridge, one of the primary reasons for the TRRA's original formation, had become obsolete for modern-day rail traffic due to the height restrictions it placed on rail cars.

By 2007, only about 30% of the total deck reserved for automobile use had been removed. Most of the removed sections were on the East St. Louis side. The western ramp was relinquished to Ralston Purina and turned into a parking lot. In 2013 the TRRA began removing all of the auto deck over the river. By late 2014, the vehicle deck on the bridge proper had been removed, and work was progressing onto the western approach.

The MacArthur Bridge continues to be the vital railroad link connecting west to east for a large number of commodities, and bulk cargo. In 2012, it was the 17th busiest railroad bridge in the United States carrying roughly 40 trains per day.

=== Rehabilitation ===
In 2022, the Terminal Railroad began a $57.3 million rehabilitation project on the bridge. The first phase included replacing a single truss span over Broadway to the west of the main bridge with a three-span girder bridge, as well as rehabilitating the bridge's floor system. The second phase, scheduled for completion in 2026, is focused on the main spans and the east approach.

The renovated bridge will be able to handle a 15 ft train width (4.6 m), an increase from about 13.5 ft (4.1 m), and will support a railcar weight capacity of 315,000 lb (143,000 kg), an increase from 286,000 lb (130,000 kg). The project will allow longer and wider railroad cars on the approaches, and the new girders will extend the life of the bridge to 2085.

== See also ==
- List of crossings of the Upper Mississippi River
