= Eads Bridge =

Bridge between Illinois and Missouri, U.S.

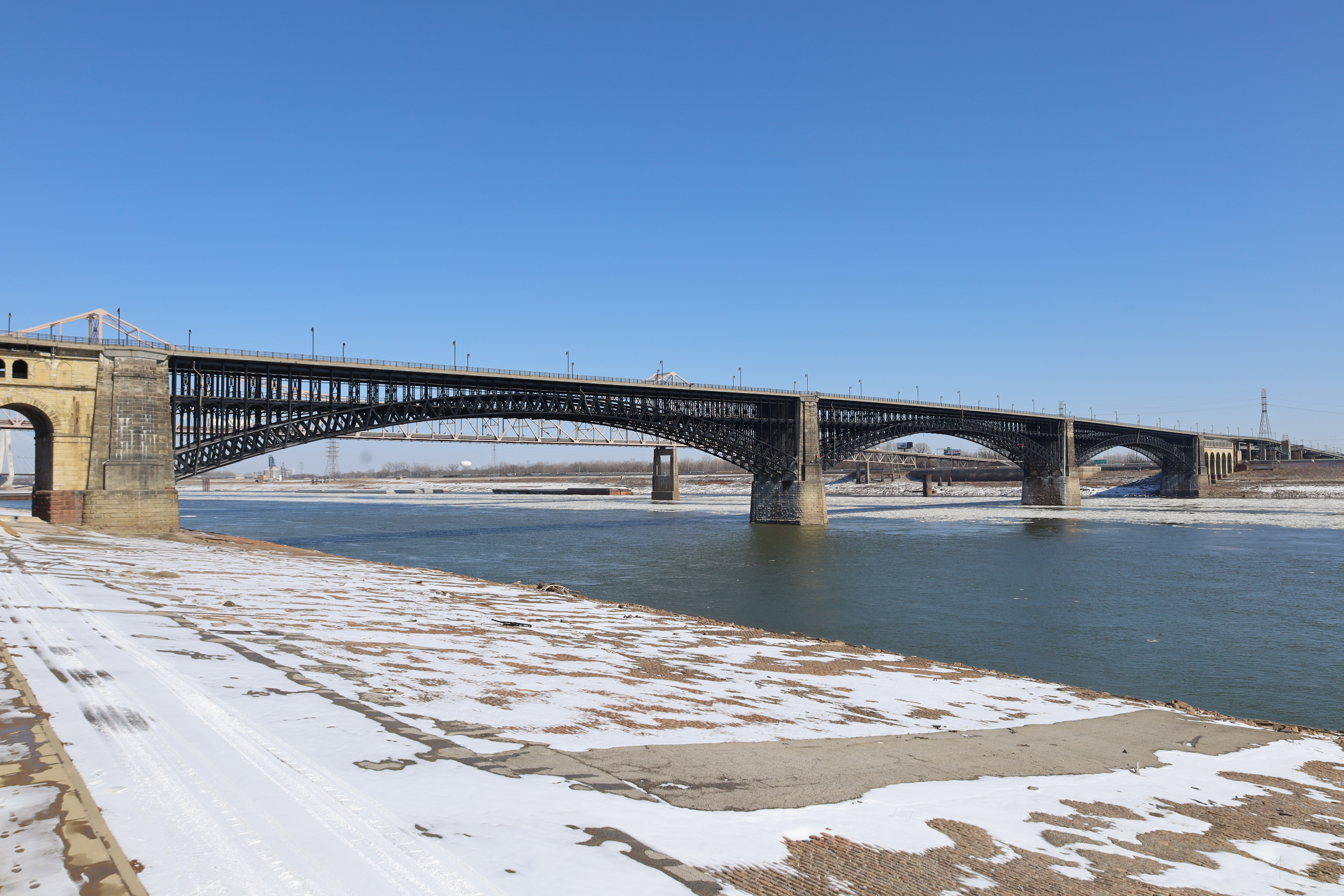
- The bridge in 2025
- Coordinates: 38°37′41″N 90°10′17″W
- Carries: 4 highway lanes 2 MetroLink tracks
- Crosses: Mississippi River
- Locale: St. Louis, Missouri and East St. Louis, Illinois
- Maintained by: City of St. Louis

Characteristics
- Design: Arch bridge
- Total length: 6,442 ft (1,964 m)
- Width: 46 ft (14 m)
- Longest span: 520 ft (158 m)
- Clearance below: 88 ft (27 m)

History
- Designer: James B. Eads
- Construction start: 1867; 159 years ago
- Opened: 1874; 152 years ago

Statistics
- Daily traffic: 7,100 (2014)
- Eads Bridge
- U.S. National Register of Historic Places
- U.S. National Historic Landmark
- St. Louis Landmark
- NRHP reference No.: 66000946

Significant dates
- Added to NRHP: October 15, 1966
- Designated NHL: January 29, 1964

Location
- Interactive map of Eads Bridge

The Eads Bridge is a road-rail bridge over the Mississippi River connecting the cities of St. Louis, Missouri, and East St. Louis, Illinois, United States. It is located on the St. Louis riverfront between Laclede's Landing to the north, and the grounds of the Gateway Arch to the south. The bridge is named for its designer and builder, James Buchanan Eads. Work on the bridge began in 1867, and it was completed in 1874. The Eads Bridge was the first bridge across the Mississippi south of the Missouri River. Earlier bridges were located north of the Missouri, where the Mississippi is narrower. None of the earlier bridges survived, which means that the Eads Bridge is also the oldest bridge on the river.

To accommodate the massive size and strength of the Mississippi River, the Eads Bridge required a number of engineering feats. It pioneered the large-scale use of steel as a structural material, leading the shift from wrought-iron as the default material for large structures. Its foundations, more than 100 feet below water level, were the deepest underwater constructions at the time. They were installed using pneumatic caissons, a pioneering application of caisson technology in the United States and, at the time, by far the largest caissons ever built. Its 520-foot (160 m) center arch was the longest rigid span ever built at the time. The arches were built suspended from temporary wooden towers, sometimes cited as the first use of the "cantilever principle" for a large bridge. These engineering principles were used for later bridges, including the Brooklyn Bridge, which began construction in 1870.

The Eads Bridge became a famous image of the city of St. Louis, superseded only by the Gateway Arch, completed in 1965. The highway deck was closed to automobiles from 1991 to 2003, but has been restored and now carries both vehicular and pedestrian traffic. It connects Washington Avenue in St. Louis with Riverpark Drive and East Broadway in East St. Louis. The former railroad deck now carries the St. Louis MetroLink light rail system, connecting Missouri and Illinois stations.

The bridge is listed on the National Register of Historic Places as a National Historic Landmark. As of April 2014, it carries about 8,100 vehicles daily, down 3,000 since the Stan Musial Veterans Memorial Bridge opened in February 2014.

== History ==
=== Construction ===
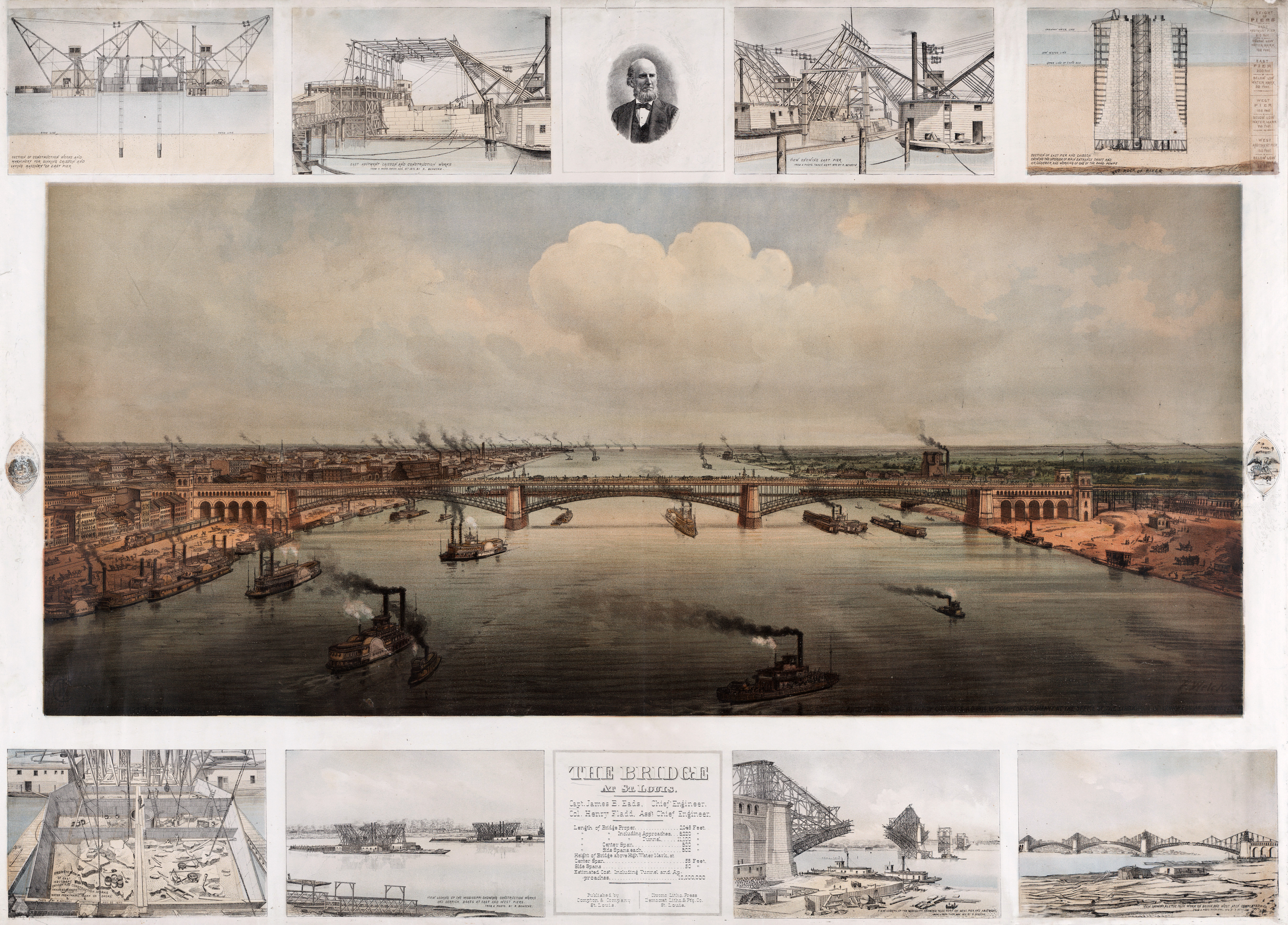
Poster showing the construction of the bridge in different phases, ca. 1874.

The Eads Bridge was built by the Illinois and St. Louis Bridge Company. A subcontractor was the Keystone Bridge Company, founded in 1865 by Andrew Carnegie, which erected the steel superstructure.

The growth of railroads since the Civil War had depressed river shipping trade, and Chicago was fast gaining as the center of commerce in the West. The bridge was envisioned to restore St. Louis' eminence as a center of commerce by connecting railroad and vehicle transportation across the river. Although he had no experience in building bridges, James Eads was chosen as chief engineer.

In an attempt to secure their future, steamboat interests successfully lobbied to place restrictions on bridge construction, requiring spans and heights previously unheard of. This was ostensibly to maintain sufficient operating room for steamboats beneath the bridge's base for the then foreseeable future. The unproclaimed purpose was to require a bridge so grand and lofty that it was impossible to erect according to conventional building techniques. The steamboat parties planned to prevent any structure from being built, in order to ensure continued dependence on river traffic to sustain commerce in the region.

Such a bridge required a radical design solution. The Mississippi River's strong current was almost 12 1/2 feet per second (3.8 m/s) and the builders had to battle ice floes in the winter. The ribbed arch had been a known construction technique for centuries. The triple span, tubular metallic arch construction was supported by two shore abutments and two mid-river piers. Four pairs of arches per span (upper and lower) were set eight feet (2.4 m) apart, supporting an upper deck for vehicular traffic and a lower deck for rail traffic.

Construction involved varied and confusing design elements and pressures. State and federal charters precluded suspension or draw bridges, or wood construction. There were constraints on span size and the height above the water line. The location required reconciling differences in heights—from the low Illinois floodplain of the east bank of the river to the high Missouri cliff on the west bank. The bedrock could only be reached by deep drilling, as it was 125 feet (38 m) below water level on the Illinois side and 85 feet (26 m) below on the Missouri side.

These pressures resulted in a bridge noted as innovative for precision and accuracy of construction and quality control. This was the first use of structural alloy steel in a major building construction, through use of cast chromium steel components – even though as 1988 tests showed, the amount of chromium was too low to influence the strength, and the steel in general wouldn't be considered suitable for any structural application in modern times. The completed bridge also relied on significant—and unknown—amounts of wrought iron. Eads argued that the great compressive strength of steel was ideal for use in the upright arch design. His decision resulted from a curious combination of chance and necessity, due to the insufficient strength of alternative material choices.

The particular physical difficulties of the site stimulated interesting solutions to construction problems. The deep caissons used for pier and abutment construction signaled a new chapter in civil engineering. Piers were sunk almost 100 feet (30 m) below the river's surface. Unable to construct falsework to erect the arches, because they would obstruct river traffic, Eads's engineers devised a cantilevered rigging system to close the arches.

Masonry piers were built to heights of almost 120 feet (37 m), about the height of a ten-story building. About 78 feet (24 m) of that span was driven through the sandy riverbed until it hit bedrock. Eads implemented a building method that he had observed in Europe, whereby masonry was set atop a metal chamber filled with compressed air. Stone was added to the chamber, which caused the caisson to sink. Workers dove into the caisson to shovel sand into a pump that shot it out into the air so the masonry could be sunk into the riverbed. Numerous workers who operated in the Eads Bridge caissons, still among the deepest ever sunk, suffered from "caisson disease" (also known as "the bends" or decompression sickness). Fifteen workers died, two other workers were permanently disabled, and 77 were severely afflicted.

The Eads Bridge was recognized as an innovative and exciting achievement. Eads secured 47 patents during his lifetime, many of which were taken out for parts of the bridge's structure and devices for its construction. President Ulysses S. Grant dedicated the bridge on July 4, 1874, and General William T. Sherman drove the gold spike completing construction. After completion, 14 locomotives crossed the bridge to prove its stability.

On June 14, 1874, John Robinson led a "test elephant" on a stroll across the new Eads Bridge to prove that it was safe. A big crowd cheered as the elephant from a traveling circus lumbered toward Illinois. Popular belief held that elephants had instincts that would make them avoid setting foot on unsafe structures. Two weeks later, Eads sent 14 locomotives back and forth across the bridge at one time. The opening day celebration on July 4, 1874, featured a parade that stretched for 15 miles (24 km) through the streets of St. Louis.

During the bridge's construction, The New York Times called it "The World's Eighth Wonder".

The cost of building the bridge was nearly $10 million ($280 million with inflation).

=== Early history ===
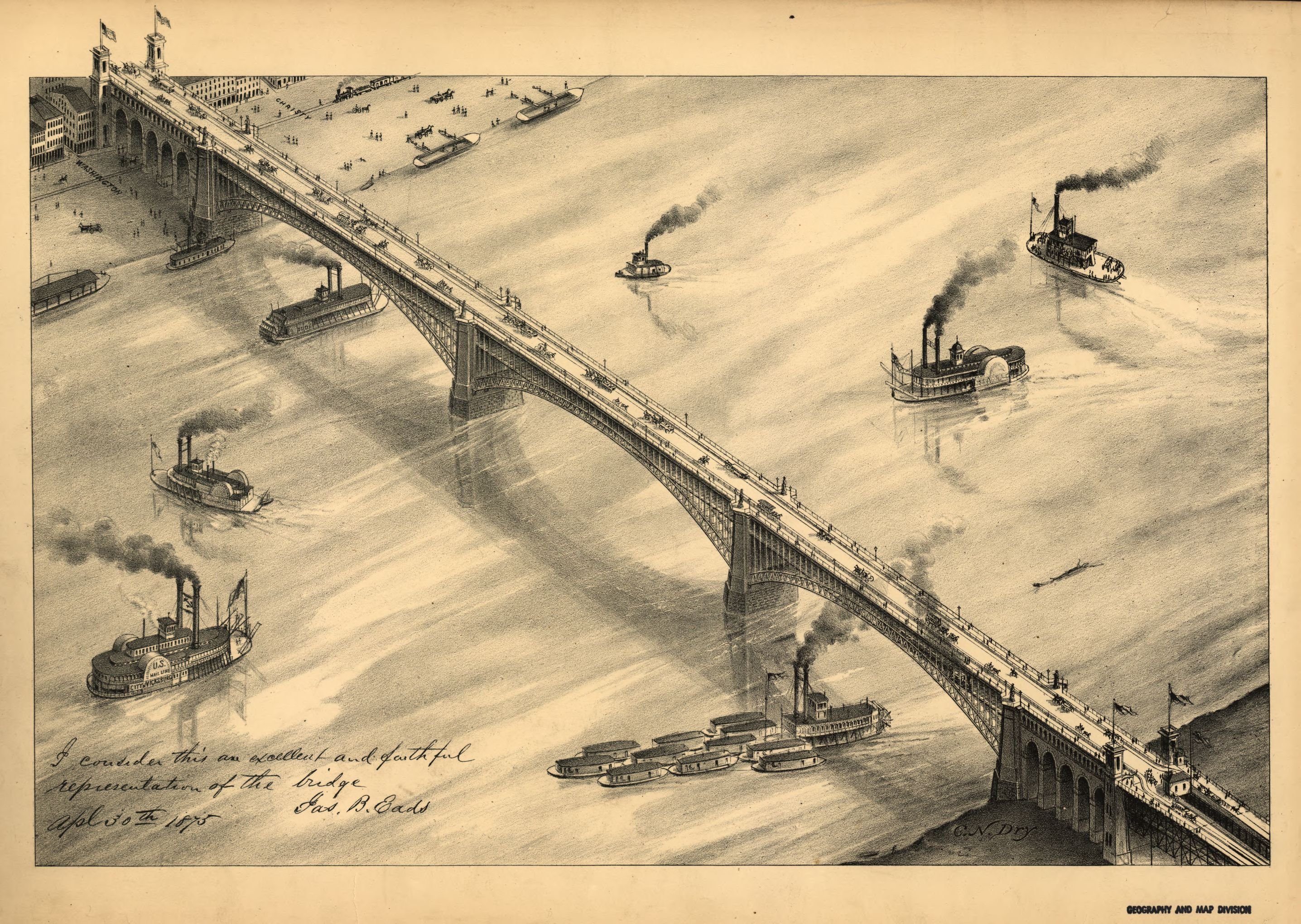
An 1875 drawing of Eads Bridge by Camille N. Dry.

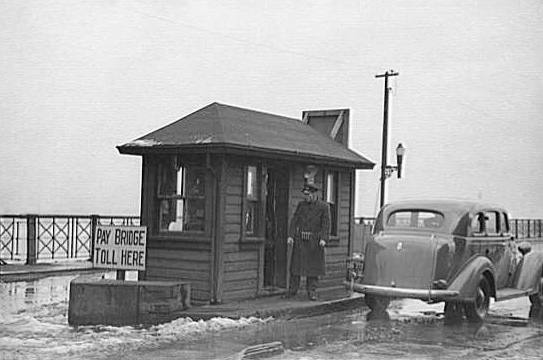
Toll collection in 1939

The Eads Bridge was undercapitalized during construction and burdened with debt. Because of its historic focus on the Mississippi and river trade, St. Louis lacked adequate rail terminal facilities, and the bridge was poorly planned to coordinate rail access. Although an engineering and aesthetic success, the bridge operations became bankrupt within a year of opening. The railroads boycotted the bridge, resulting in a loss of tolls. The bridge was later sold at auction for 20 cents on the dollar. This sale caused the National Bank of the State of Missouri to fold, which was the largest bank failure in the United States at that time. Eads did not suffer financial consequences. Many involved with financing the bridge were indicted, but Eads was not.

Granite for the bridge came from the Iron County, Missouri, quarry of B. Gratz Brown, Missouri Governor and U.S. Senator, who had helped secure federal financing for the bridge.

In April 1875, after the failure of the Illinois and St Louis Bridge Company, the bridge was sold at public auction, for $2 million, to a newly incorporated St. Louis Bridge Company controlled by the old company's creditors. This group was bought-out two years later by the Terminal Railroad Association of St. Louis (TRRA).

At the 1893 Columbian Exposition, Missouri exhibited a model of the bridge made of sugar cane. In 1898 the bridge was featured on the $2 Trans-Mississippi Issue of postage stamps. One hundred years later the design was reprinted in a commemorative souvenir sheet.

In 1949, the bridge's strength was tested with electromagnetic strain gauges. It was determined that Eads' original estimation of an allowable load of 3,000 pounds per foot (4,500 kg/m) could be raised to 5,000 pounds per foot (7,400 kg/m). According to Carol Ferring Shepley, a professional writer who has written a biography of the bridge's designer, Eads Bridge is still considered one of the greatest bridges ever built.

The bridge was designated as a National Historic Landmark in 1964, in recognition of its innovations in design, materials, and construction methods, and its importance in the history of large-scale engineering projects. On its 100th anniversary in 1974, the Times' architectural critic, Ada Louise Huxtable, described it as "among the most beautiful works of man."

=== Later history ===
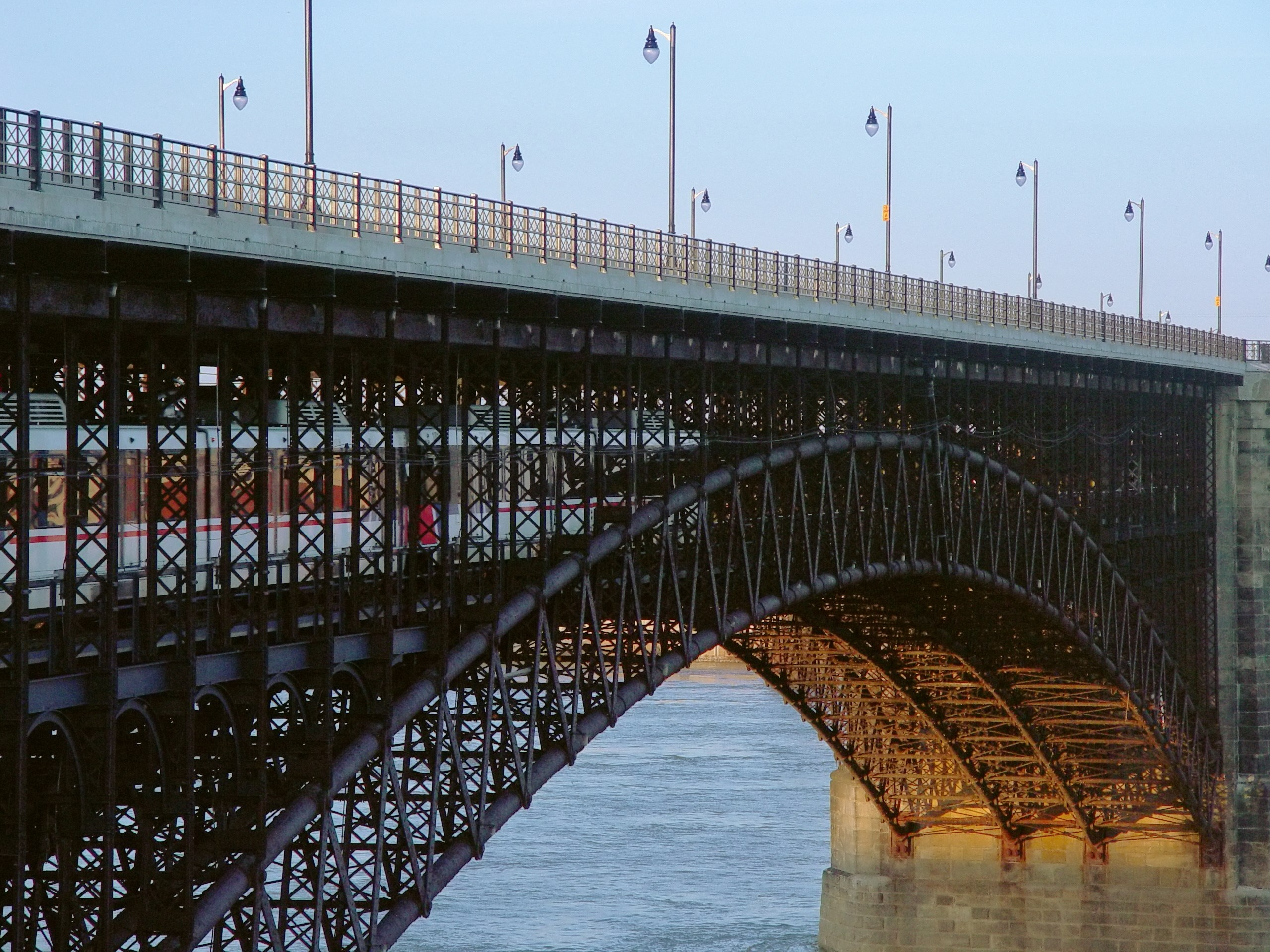
Eads Bridge in 2004 showing MetroLink train running on lower deck. Light posts for upper automobile deck can be seen along the upper rails.

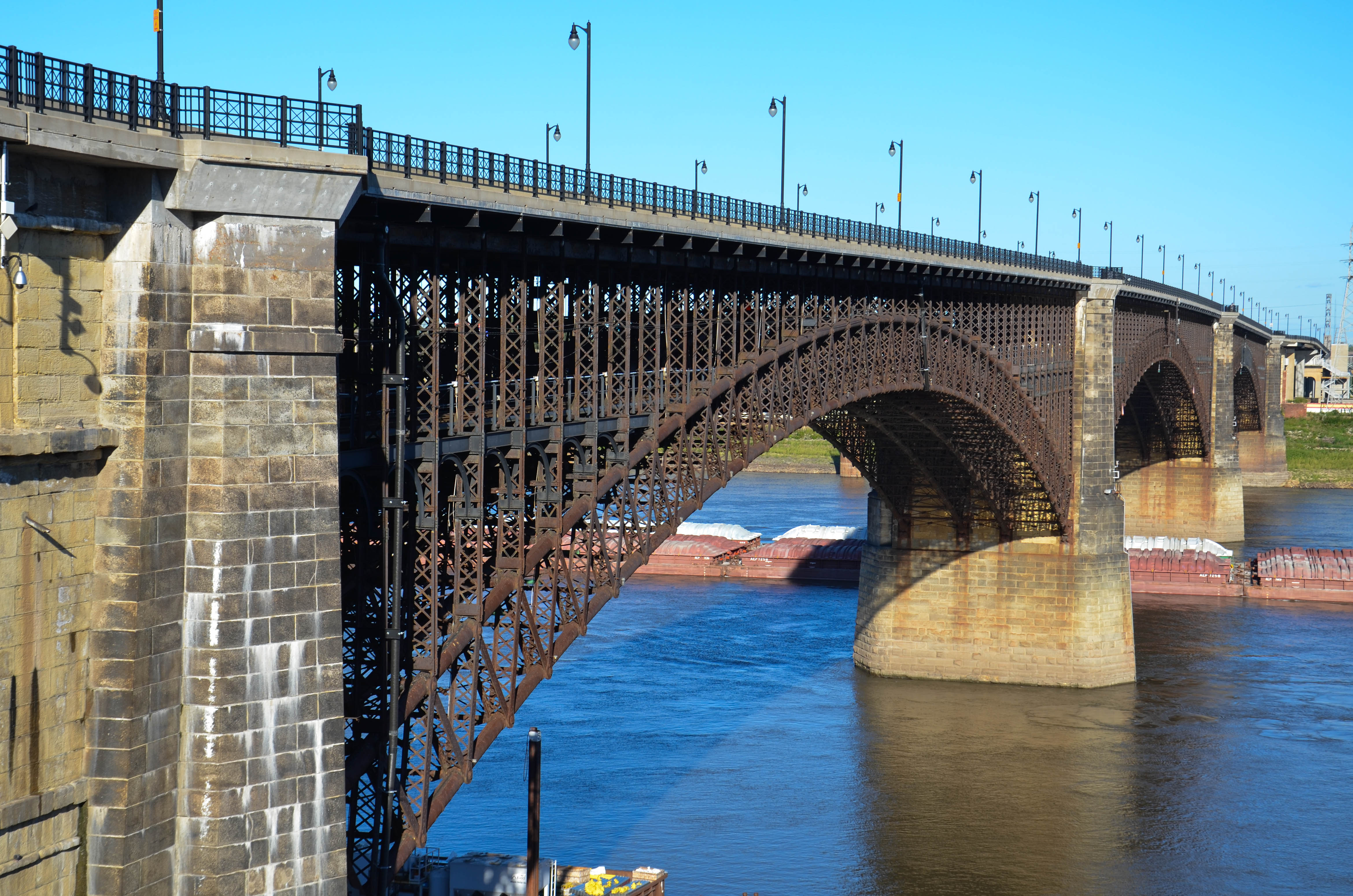
The bridge in 2012

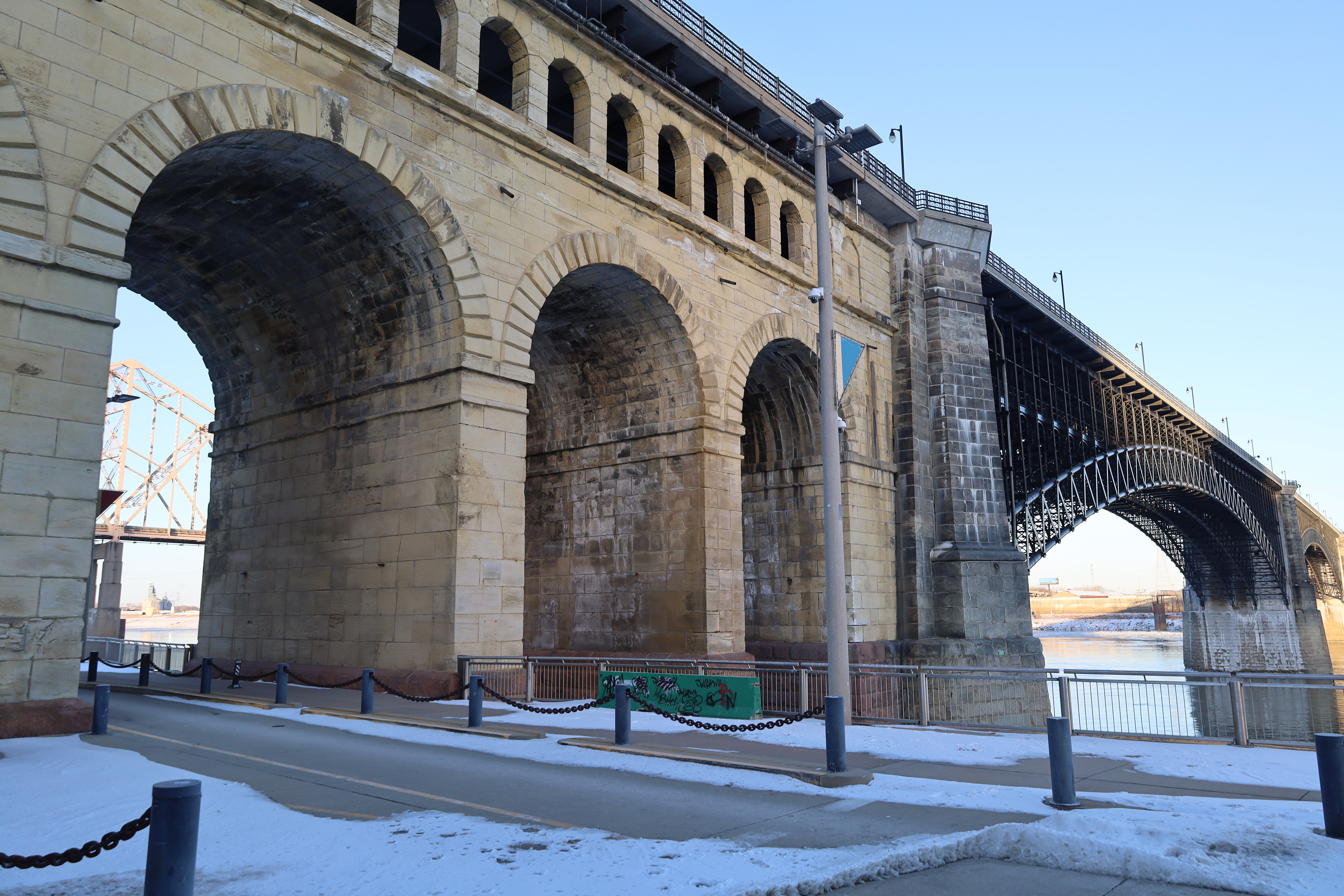
Masonry arches at the west end of the bridge in 2025

The Eads Bridge had long hosted only passenger trains on its rail deck. In the late 20th century, however, passenger traffic had declined because of individual automobile use, and the railroad industry was restructuring. By the 1970s, the Terminal Railroad Association had abandoned its Eads trackage. The bridge had lost all remaining passenger rail traffic to the MacArthur Bridge during the early years of Amtrak; the dimensions of modern passenger diesels were incompatible with both the bridge and the adjoining tunnel linking the Union Station trackage with Eads.

The TRRA owned the bridge until 1989, when the Terminal Railroad transferred the bridge to the Bi-State Regional Transportation Authority and the City of St. Louis, for incorporation into St Louis' MetroLink light rail system. In exchange for Eads Bridge, the TRRA acquired the MacArthur Bridge, previously owned by the City of St Louis.

MetroLink service over the bridge began in 1993. The bridge was closed to automobile traffic between 1991 and 2003, when the City of St. Louis completed a project to restore the highway deck.

In 1998, the Naval Facilities Engineering Service Center investigated the effects of the ramming of the bridge by the towboat Anne Holly on April 4 of that year. The ramming resulted in the near breakaway of the SS Admiral, a riverboat casino. Implementing several recommended changes reduced the odds of this happening in the future.

In 2012, the Bi-State Development Agency/Metro (BSDA/Metro) started the Eads Bridge Rehabilitation project to extend the life of the bridge to at least the year 2091. The restorations included replacing 1.2 million pounds of struts, bracing, and other support steel dating to the 1880s; removing all paint and corrosion from the superstructure; re-painting the superstructure with a rust-inhibiting coating; repairing damaged structure; rebuilding concrete supports; restoring the brick archways; and upgrading the MetroLink's rails. The total cost was $48 million, with $27 million coming from the American Recovery and Reinvestment Act of 2009. While expected to start in 2009, work did not begin until 2012 due to labor disputes and higher-than-expected cost estimates. Workers completed the project in 2016.

== Connecting tunnel ==
=== Construction ===
City fathers wanted a wagon bridge to the heart of town to highlight the best features of St. Louis. Economics required that it be a railroad bridge, but there was no space for railroads in the heart of downtown. Hence, a tunnel was authorized to connect the bridge to the Missouri Pacific Railroad to the south (and later to the new Union Station).

Eads worked out the specifications for the tunnel. It was to be a “cut and cover” tunnel 4000 ft long, 30 ft below street level. They advertised for bids in the Missouri Republican on August 31, 1872. The contract was awarded to William Skrainka and Company. Construction began in October. A series of problems arose including quicksand and springs on the planned route. Also several workers were injured; at least one was killed.

On November 29, the city council passed an ordinance changing the tunnel route to Eight Street and transferring the right to build to the newly formed St. Louis Tunnel Railroad Company.

In April, Skrainka and Co. decided the project was too difficult. They agreed to complete construction south of Market St. The work north of Market was assigned to James Andrews, the stonemason overseeing construction of the bridge piers.

The Eads Bridge was ready to be opened after seven years of construction on July 4, 1874. The celebration included a fifteen-car train filled with 500 dignitaries pulled by three locomotives that departed from the St. Louis, Vandalia, and Terre Haute Railroad station in East St. Louis. Locomotives were provided by the Illinois Central Railroad and the Vandalia line (a Pennsylvania Railroad subsidiary). The route crossed the Eads Bridge and traveled through the tunnel to Mill Creek Valley and then returned.

=== Operation ===
Locomotive smoke is a concern in tunnels, especially passenger tunnels. Specially designed coke-burning “smoke-consuming engines” from the Baldwin Locomotive Works had yet to be ordered. News reports tell of passengers coughing and gasping for breath. Construction of the tunnel was not yet complete. Only one of the two tracks was available and ventilation was not yet arranged.

A photograph of the St. Louis Bridge Company's coke-burning engine appears on page 38 of Brown's Baldwin Locomotive Works.

The St. Louis Bridge Company almost certainly had a transfer station in East St. Louis to switch trains entering St. Louis from Illinois between steam locomotives and the coke-burning engine used in this tunnel, as the Eads Bridge's railroad deck connects directly to the tunnel. This would have been analogous to the later (1910–1937), well-known Manhattan Transfer station in New Jersey, except there rail passengers switched between the electric trains used in the New York Tunnel Extension tunnels under the Hudson River (North River Tunnels) and thru New York City (historic Penn Station and East River Tunnels) and the steam trains then used on the Pennsylvania Railroad main line (now part of Amtrak’s electrified Northeast Corridor along with the tunnels and present-day Penn Station), instead of switching engines on the train itself as was apparently the case in St. Louis.

In 1875, the bridge and tunnel companies declared bankruptcy. In 1881, Jay Gould got control of the bridge and tunnel companies by threatening to build a competing bridge four miles north of St. Louis. In 1889, Gould was instrumental in the creation of the Terminal Railroad Association of St. Louis. He died in 1892, but this led to the construction of Union Station in 1894.

The Eads Bridge and its tunnel are now used by MetroLink, the St. Louis light rail system, which is powered by overhead wires that were installed during the rehabilitation of the bridge for MetroLink service.

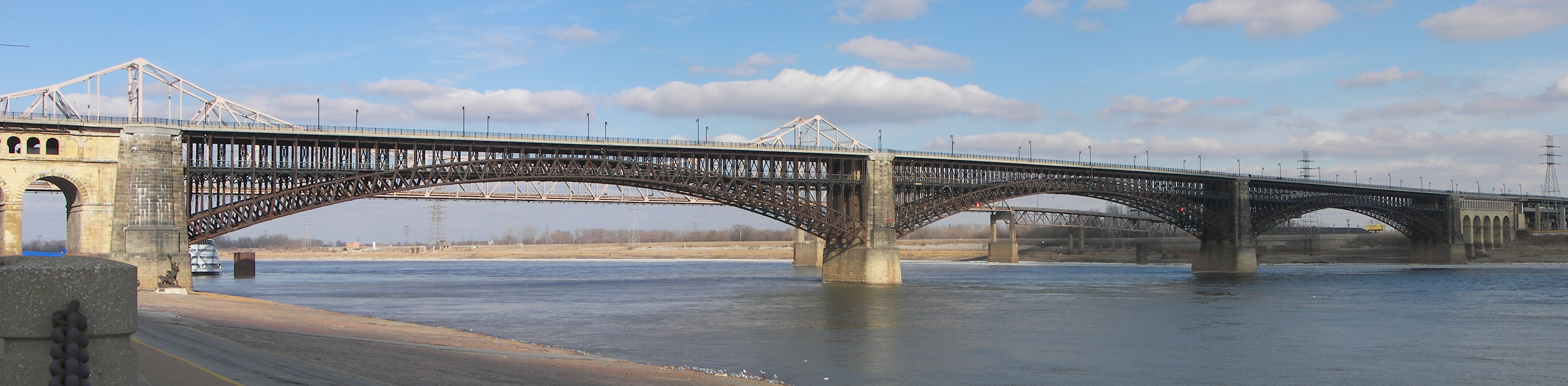
Eads Bridge

== See also ==
- List of bridges documented by the Historic American Engineering Record in Illinois and in Missouri
- List of crossings of the Upper Mississippi River
- List of National Historic Landmarks in Illinois and in Missouri
- National Register of Historic Places listings in St. Clair County, Illinois and in Downtown and Downtown West St. Louis
- List of bridges on the National Register of Historic Places in Illinois and in Missouri

== Bibliography ==
- Jackson, Robert W. (2006). Rails across the Mississippi: A History of the St. Louis Bridge. Urbana, IL: University of Illinois Press. ISBN 978-0252074097.
