= McKinley Bridge =

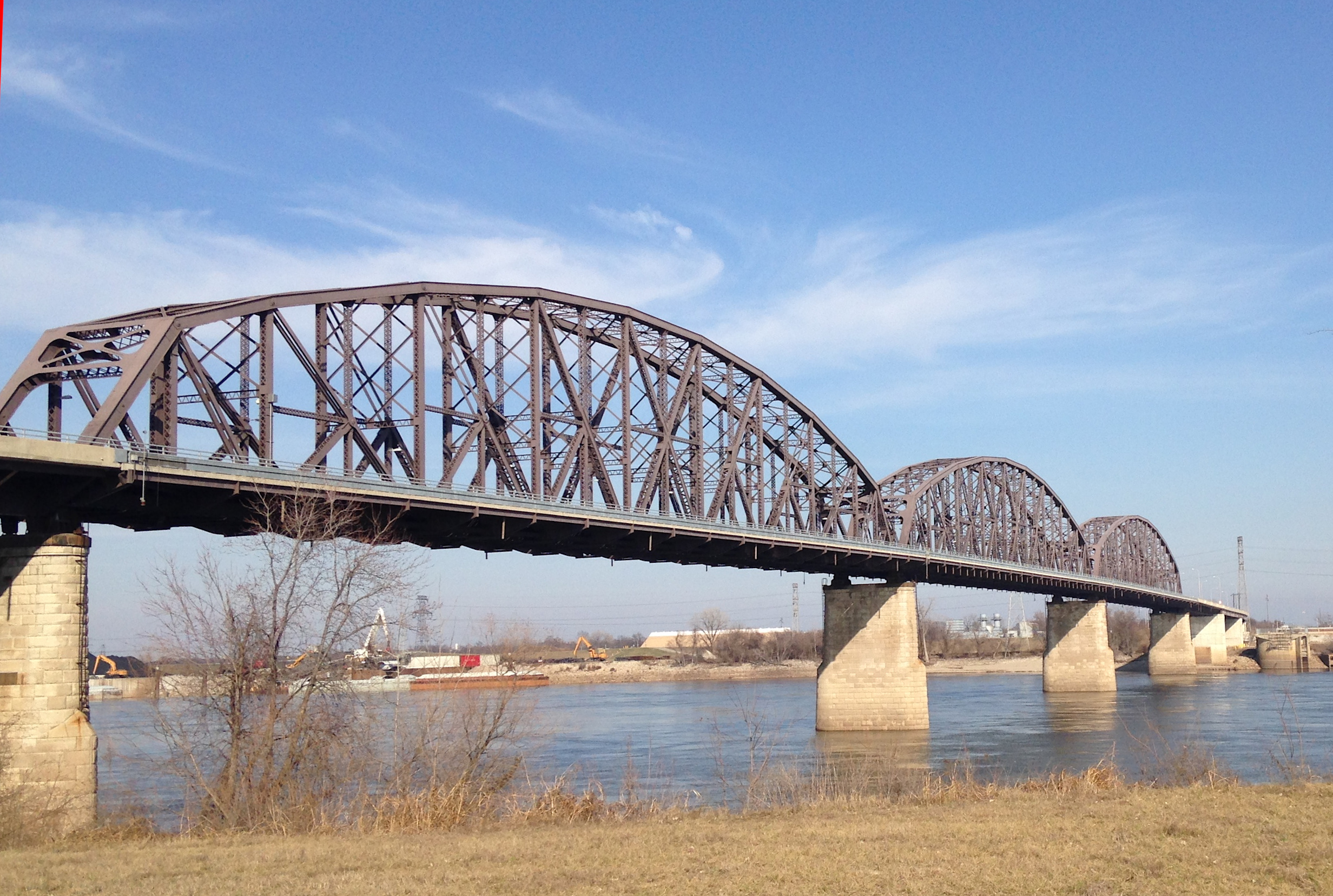
- The bridge in 2017
- Coordinates: 38°39′54″N 90°10′58″W
- Carries: 1 dedicated service lane, 2 lanes of traffic, and 1 dedicated pedestrian/bicycle lane
- Crosses: Mississippi River
- Locale: St. Louis, Missouri and Venice, Illinois
- Maintained by: Illinois Department of Transportation

Characteristics
- Design: Steel truss bridge
- Total length: 6,313 feet (1,924 m)
- Longest span: Three - 519 feet (158 m) spans
- Clearance below: 90 feet (27 m)

History
- Opened: November 10, 1910; 115 years ago Pedestrian re-opening: November 17, 2007; 18 years ago Full re-opening: December 17, 2007; 18 years ago

Statistics
- Daily traffic: 17,000 (2014)

Location
- Interactive map of McKinley Bridge

The McKinley Bridge is a steel truss bridge across the Mississippi River. It connects northern portions of St. Louis, Missouri with Venice, Illinois. It opened in 1910, was taken out of service in 2001 due to disrepair, and reopened in 2007 after a major rehabilitation. Originally a combined interurban railway and vehicular bridge, it had become vehicular-only by 1978.

== Description ==
The bridge was named for its builder, William B. McKinley, chief executive of the Illinois Traction System interurban electric railway, which accessed St. Louis via the bridge; and not for President William McKinley.

The current alignment of the bridge carries two lanes of traffic on the inner lanes. The outer lane on the north side of the bridge will become an exclusive service lane, while the outer lane on the south side of the bridge will become a sidewalk and bike path. It is expected to carry 14,000 vehicles across the river daily, but total traffic across the river increased in 2014 by 7.4% over 2013 levels, and in April 2014, it was estimated that 17,000 vehicles use it daily.

The bridge is accessible from Illinois Route 3 in Illinois, and from the intersection of Salisbury and North 9th Street in the city of St. Louis.

== History ==
=== Construction and early history ===
The bridge was built by the Illinois Traction electric interurban railroad to cross the Mississippi River between St. Louis, Missouri and East St. Louis, Illinois in 1910. Its designer was Polish-American engineer Ralph Modjeski. It was constructed by Missouri Valley Bridge & Iron Co. and Pennsylvania Steel Co. The bridge was owned by the city of Venice, Illinois and operated as a toll bridge.

When the U.S. Highway System was instituted in 1926, the McKinley Bridge then carried auto traffic on the famous Route 66 across the Mississippi River for four years, until the route was transferred to the Chain of Rocks Bridge to avoid downtown St. Louis.

The bridge carried both railroad and vehicular traffic across the Mississippi River for decades. By 1978, the railroad line over the span was closed, and an additional set of lanes was opened for vehicles in the inner roadway.

=== Rehabilitation ===
After decades of disrepair due to the lack of toll revenues, the McKinley Bridge was closed in 2001.

The state of Illinois attempted to provide money to the city of Venice for repairing the bridge, but was unable to do so because of the outstanding taxes owed by the city. As a result, the City of St. Louis foreclosed on the bridge, delaying reconstruction efforts further. In an agreement reached in June 2003, the states of Illinois and Missouri agreed to take over ownership of the bridge from the city of Venice.

Rehabilitation began in 2004 and the original plans for the repairs anticipated a re-opening in late 2005. However, the date was pushed back due to the addition of The Great Rivers Greenway Bikeway tie-in.

The rehabilitated McKinley Bridge consists of the three original river truss spans (Spans 26-29, 519 ft (158 m) long each) and thirty-three steel plate girder spans, with a length totaling 4,162.5 ft (1,268.7 m). The Bridge reopened to pedestrians and bicycles on November 17, 2007, with a grand re-opening celebration. It was fully reopened to vehicular traffic on December 17, 2007.

== See also ==
- List of crossings of the Upper Mississippi River
- List of road-rail bridges
